= Stefan Edberg career statistics =

This is a list of the main career statistics of former professional tennis player Stefan Edberg.

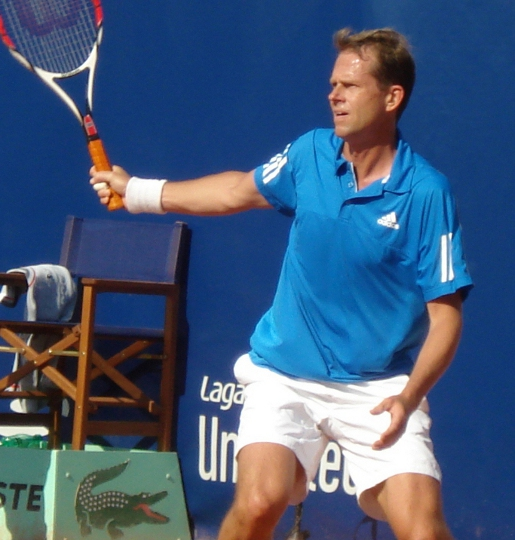
Stefan Edberg

== Grand Slam tournament finals ==
=== Singles: 11 (6 titles / 5 runner-ups) ===
Result	Year	Championship	Surface	Opponent	Score
Win	1985	Australian Open	Grass	(Sweden) Mats Wilander	6–4, 6–3, 6–3
Win	1987	Australian Open (2)	Grass	(Australia) Pat Cash	6–3, 6–4, 3–6, 5–7, 6–3
Win	1988	Wimbledon	Grass	(Germany) Boris Becker	4–6, 7–6^{(7–2)}, 6–4, 6–2
Loss	1989	French Open	Clay	(United States) Michael Chang	1–6, 6–3, 6–4, 4–6, 2–6
Loss	1989	Wimbledon	Grass	(Germany) Boris Becker	0–6, 6–7^{(1–7)}, 4–6
Loss	1990	Australian Open	Hard	(Czechoslovakia) Ivan Lendl	6–4, 6–7^{(3–7)}, 2–5, ret.
Win	1990	Wimbledon (2)	Grass	(Germany) Boris Becker	6–2, 6–2, 3–6, 3–6, 6–4
Win	1991	US Open	Hard	(United States) Jim Courier	6–2, 6–4, 6–0
Loss	1992	Australian Open	Hard	(United States) Jim Courier	3–6, 6–3, 4–6, 2–6
Win	1992	US Open (2)	Hard	(United States) Pete Sampras	3–6, 6–4, 7–6^{(7–5)}, 6–2
Loss	1993	Australian Open	Hard	(United States) Jim Courier	2–6, 1–6, 6–2, 5–7

=== Doubles: 5 (3 titles / 2 runner-ups) ===
Result	Year	Championship	Surface	Partner	Opponents	Score
Loss	1984	US Open	Hard	(Sweden) Anders Järryd	(Australia) John Fitzgerald (Czechoslovakia) Tomáš Šmíd	6–7^{(5–7)}, 3–6, 3–6
Loss	1986	French Open	Clay	(Sweden) Anders Järryd	(Australia) John Fitzgerald (Czechoslovakia) Tomáš Šmíd	3–6, 6–4, 3–6, 7–6^{(7–4)}, 12–14
Win	1987	Australian Open	Grass	(Sweden) Anders Järryd	(Australia) Peter Doohan (Australia) Laurie Warder	6–4, 6–4, 7–6^{(7–3)}
Win	1987	US Open	Hard	(Sweden) Anders Järryd	(United States) Ken Flach (United States) Robert Seguso	7–6^{(7–1)}, 6–2, 4–6, 5–7, 7–6^{(7–2)}
Win	1996	Australian Open (2)	Hard	(Czechoslovakia) Petr Korda	(United States) Alex O'Brien (Canada) Sébastien Lareau	7–5, 7–5, 4–6, 6–1

== Grand Prix / ATP year-end championships finals ==
=== Singles: 2 (1–1) ===
Result	Year	Championship	Surface	Opponent	Score
Win	1989	Grand Prix Masters	Carpet (i)	(Germany) Boris Becker	4–6, 7–6^{(8–6)}, 6–3, 6–1
Loss	1990	ATP Tour World Championships	Carpet (i)	(United States) Andre Agassi	7–5, 6–7^{(5–7)}, 5–7, 2–6

== WCT year-end championships finals ==
=== Singles: 1 (0–1) ===
Result	Year	Championship	Surface	Opponent	Score
Loss	1988	WCT Finals	Carpet (i)	(Germany) Boris Becker	4–6, 6–1, 5–7, 2–6

== Grand Prix Super Series / ATP Super 9 finals ==
=== Singles: 20 finals (8–12) ===
Result	Year	Tournament	Surface	Opponent	Score
Loss	1986	Tokyo	Carpet (i)	(Germany) Boris Becker	6–7^{(5–7)}, 1–6
Win	1986	Stockholm	Hard (i)	(Sweden) Mats Wilander	6–2, 6–1, 6–1
Loss	1986	Canada	Hard	(West Germany) Boris Becker	4–6, 6–3, 3–6
Win	1987	Cincinnati	Hard	(Germany) Boris Becker	6–4, 6–1
Win	1987	Stockholm	Hard (i)	(Sweden) Jonas Svensson	7–5, 6–2, 4–6, 6–4
Loss	1987	Canada	Hard	(Czechoslovakia) Ivan Lendl	4–6, 5–7
Win	1987	Tokyo	Carpet (i)	(Czechoslovakia) Ivan Lendl	6–7^{(4–7)}, 6–4, 6–4
Loss	1987	Indian Wells	Hard	(West Germany) Boris Becker	4–6, 4–6, 5–7
Loss	1988	Cincinnati	Hard	(Sweden) Mats Wilander	6–3, 6–7, 6–7
Loss	1989	Cincinnati	Hard	(United States) Brad Gilbert	4–6, 6–2, 6–7
Loss	1989	Paris	Carpet (i)	(West Germany) Boris Becker	4–6, 3–6, 3–6
Win	1990	Indian Wells	Hard	(United States) Andre Agassi	6–4, 5–7, 7–6^{(7–1)}, 7–6^{(8–6)}
Loss	1990	Key Biscayne	Hard	(United States) Andre Agassi	1–6, 4–6, 6–0, 2–6
Win	1990	Cincinnati	Hard	(United States) Brad Gilbert	6–1, 6–1
Loss	1990	Stockholm	Carpet (i)	(Germany) Boris Becker	4–6, 0–6, 3–6
Win	1990	Paris	Carpet (i)	(Germany) Boris Becker	3–3, ret.
Loss	1991	Stockholm	Carpet (i)	(Germany) Boris Becker	6–3, 4–6, 6–1, 2–6, 2–6
Win	1992	Hamburg	Clay	(Germany) Michael Stich	5–7, 6–4, 6–1
Loss	1993	Cincinnati	Hard	(United States) Michael Chang	5–7, 6–0, 4–6
Loss	1994	Cincinnati	Hard	(United States) Michael Chang	2–6, 5–7

=== Doubles: 2 finals (1–1) ===
Result	Year	Tournament	Surface	Partner	Opponents	Score
Win	1993	Monte Carlo	Clay	(Czech Republic) Petr Korda	(Netherlands) Paul Haarhuis (Netherlands) Mark Koevermans	3–6, 6–2, 7–6
Loss	1993	Cincinnati	Hard	(Sweden) Henrik Holm	(United States) Andre Agassi (Czech Republic) Petr Korda	4–6, 6–7

- Note: before the ATP took over running the men's professional tour in 1990 the Grand Prix Tour had a series of events that were precursors to the Masters Series known as the Grand Prix Super Series.

== Performance timelines ==
Key
W	F	SF	QF	#R	RR	Q#	P#	DNQ	A	Z#	PO	G	S	B	NMS	NTI	P	NH

(W) winner; (F) finalist; (SF) semifinalist; (QF) quarterfinalist; (#R) rounds 4, 3, 2, 1; (RR) round-robin stage; (Q#) qualification round; (P#) preliminary round; (DNQ) did not qualify; (A) absent; (Z#) Davis/Fed Cup Zonal Group (with number indication) or (PO) play-off; (G) gold, (S) silver or (B) bronze Olympic/Paralympic medal; (NMS) not a Masters tournament; (NTI) not a Tier I tournament; (P) postponed; (NH) not held; (SR) strike rate (events won / competed); (W–L) win–loss record.

=== Singles ===
Tournament	1982	1983	1984	1985	1986	1987	1988	1989	1990	1991	1992	1993	1994	1995	1996	SR	W–L	Win %
Grand Slam tournaments
Australian Open	A	2R	QF	W	NH	W	SF	QF	F	SF	F	F	SF	4R	2R	2 / 13	56–10	84.85
French Open	A	A	2R	QF	2R	2R	4R	F	1R	QF	3R	QF	1R	2R	4R	0 / 13	30–13	69.77
Wimbledon	A	2R	2R	4R	3R	SF	W	F	W	SF	QF	SF	2R	2R	2R	2 / 14	49–12	80.33
US Open	A	1R	2R	4R	SF	SF	4R	4R	1R	W	W	2R	3R	3R	QF	2 / 14	43–12	78.18
Win–loss	0–0	1–3	6–4	16–3	8–3	17–3	18–3	19–3	13–3	21–3	19–3	16–4	8–4	7–4	9–4	6 / 54	178–47	79.11
Year-end championships
Tennis Masters Cup	A	A	A	1R	SF	SF	SF	W	F	A	RR	RR	RR	A	A	1 / 9	18–14	56.25
Grand Slam Cup	not held								1R	A	1R	SF	1R	A	A	0 / 4	2–4	33.34
Grand Prix									ATP Super 9									
Indian Wells	A	A	A	A	A	F	3R	3R	W	SF	A	2R	SF	SF	2R	1 / 9	22–8	73%
Miami	A	A	A	A	SF	QF	A	A	F	SF	3R	QF	QF	2R	4R	0 / 9	28–9	76%
Monte Carlo	A	A	A	A	SF	2R	A	A	3R	2R	A	SF	SF	1R	2R	0 / 8	12–8	60%
Hamburg	A	A	1R	A	A	A	A	A	A	QF	W	3R	2R	A	A	1 / 5	8–4	67%
Rome	A	A	2R	A	A	A	A	A	A	A	A	A	A	QF	QF	0 / 3	7–3	70%
Canada	A	A	A	QF	F	F	2R	A	A	A	A	A	A	2R	A	0 / 5	11–5	69%
Cincinnati	A	A	QF	QF	SF	W	F	F	W	QF	SF	F	F	1R	2R	2 / 13	45–11	80%
Tokyo Indoor	A	A	A	A	F	W	SF	SF	ATP Championship Series						NH	1 / 4	15–3	83%
Stockholm	A	A	2R	SF	W	W	2R	SF	F	F	SF	QF	3R	World Series		2 / 11	32–11	74%
Paris	A	not held			A	A	A	F	W	3R	QF	SF	2R	A	QF	1 / 7	18–6	75%
Olympic Games
Summer Olympics	not held			not held			SF-B	not held			1R	not held			A	1 / 3	9–2	81.82
Career statistics
	1982	1983	1984	1985	1986	1987	1988	1989	1990	1991	1992	1993	1994	1995	1996	SR	W–L	Win %
Tournaments played	3	10	20	21	22	19	18	17	20	20	21	22	26	21	25	285		
Titles–Runner-ups	0–0	0–0	2–0	4–2	3–4	7–4	3–4	2–6	7–5	6–2	3–3	1–3	3–1	1–0	0–1	42 / 285	42–35	54.55
Hard win–loss	0–2	6–5	14–5	25–7	32–5	42–5	28–9	29–6	39–5	39–7	32–6	24–9	33–9	26–11	18–13		387–104	78.50
Clay win–loss	0–1	4–2	5–3	9–3	15–3	8–3	11–4	14–2	3–5	9–6	10–6	17–8	9–7	10–4	14–7		138–64	68.32
Grass win–loss	0–0	2–3	4–3	9–1	7–3	14–2	12–1	6–2	10–1	10–1	7–2	7–2	3–2	2–2	6–2		99–27	78.57
Carpet win–loss	0–0	0–0	9–6	17–8	16–10	14–2	16–4	15–6	18–4	18–3	19–10	13–7	15–8	4–3	8–4		182–75	70.82
Overall win–loss	0–3	12–10	32–17	60–19	70–21	78–12	67–18	64–16	70–15	76–17	68–24	61–26	60–26	42–20	46–26	42 / 285	806–270	74.91
Win (%)	0%	55%	65%	76%	77%	87%	79%	80%	82%	82%	74%	70%	70%	68%	64%	74.91%		
Year-end rankings	523	53	20	5	5	2	5	3	1	1	2	5	7	23	14	$ 20,630,941		

=== Doubles ===
Tournament	1982	1983	1984	1985	1986	1987	1988	1989	1990	1991	1992	1993	1994	1995	1996	SR	W–L
Grand Slam tournaments
Australian Open	A	1R	3R	2R	NH	W	A	QF	QF	1R	1R	3R	3R	A	W	2 / 11	20–8
French Open	A	A	QF	SF	F	A	A	A	A	A	A	SF	A	A	3R	0 / 5	18–5
Wimbledon	A	1R	3R	3R	1R	SF	A	A	A	A	A	A	A	A	A	0 / 5	8–5
US Open	A	3R	F	2R	2R	W	A	A	A	A	A	A	A	1R	A	1 / 6	15–5
Win–loss	0–0	2–3	11–4	7–4	6–3	15–1	0–0	2–1	2–1	0–1	0–1	6–1	2–1	0–1	8–1	3 / 27	61–23
Year-end championship
Masters Doubles	A	A	A	W	W	SF	A	A	A	A	A	A	A	A	A	1 / 2	6–3
Olympic Games
Summer Olympics	not held		A	not held			SF-B	not held			1R	not held			A	0 / 2	3–2
Year End Rankings	–	–	13	6	3	3	74	74	128	86	123	27	125	119	44		

== Career finals ==
=== Singles: 77 (41 titles / 36 runner-ups) ===
Legend Grand Slam tournaments (6–5) Year-end championships – Grand Prix / ATP (1–1) Year-end championships – WCT (0–1) Important Grand Prix Events / ATP Super 9 (8–12) ATP Championship Series (8–4) Grand Prix Regular Series / ATP World Series (18–13)	Titles by surface Clay (3–3) Grass (5–3) Hard (22–22) Carpet (11–8)	Titles by surface Outdoors (23–24) Indoors (18–12)

Result	W-L	Date	Tournament	Surface	Opponent	Score
Win	1–0	Mar 1984	Milan, Italy	Carpet (i)	(Sweden) Mats Wilander	6–4, 6–2
Win	2–0	Feb 1985	Memphis, US	Carpet (i)	(France) Yannick Noah	6–1, 6–0
Loss	2–1	Jul 1985	Båstad, Sweden	Clay	(Sweden) Mats Wilander	1–6, 0–6
Loss	2–2	Sep 1985	Los Angeles, US	Hard	(United States) Paul Annacone	6–7^{(5–7)}, 7–6^{(10–8)}, 6–7^{(4–7)}
Win	3–2	Sep 1985	San Francisco, US	Carpet (i)	(United States) Johan Kriek	6–4, 6–2
Win	4–2	Oct 1985	Basel, Switzerland	Hard (i)	(France) Yannick Noah	6–7^{(7–9)}, 6–4, 7–6^{(7–5)}, 6–1
Win	5–2	Dec 1985	Australian Open, Melbourne, Australia	Grass	(Sweden) Mats Wilander	6–4, 6–3, 6–3
Loss	5–3	Feb 1986	Memphis, US	Carpet (i)	(United States) Brad Gilbert	5–7, 6–7^{(3–7)}
Win	6–3	Jul 1986	Gstaad, Switzerland	Clay	(Switzerland) Roland Stadler	7–5, 4–6, 6–1, 4–6, 6–2
Loss	6–4	Aug 1986	Toronto, Canada	Hard	(West Germany) Boris Becker	4–6, 6–3, 3–6
Loss	6–5	Sep 1986	Los Angeles, US(2)	Hard	(United States) John McEnroe	2–6, 3–6
Win	7–5	Oct 1986	Basel, Switzerland (2)	Hard (i)	(France) Yannick Noah	7–6^{(7–5)}, 6–2, 6–7^{(7–9)}, 7–6^{(7–5)}
Loss	7–6	Oct 1986	Tokyo Indoor, Japan	Carpet (i)	(West Germany) Boris Becker	6–7^{(5–7)}, 1–6
Win	8–6	Nov 1986	Stockholm, Sweden	Hard (i)	(Sweden) Mats Wilander	6–2, 6–1, 6–1
Win	9–6	Jan 1987	Australian Open, Melbourne, Australia (2)	Grass	(Australia) Pat Cash	6–3, 6–4, 3–6, 5–7, 6–3
Win	10–6	Feb 1987	Memphis, US(2)	Hard (i)	(United States) Jimmy Connors	6–3, 2–1, ret.
Loss	10–7	Feb 1987	Indian Wells, US	Hard	(West Germany) Boris Becker	4–6, 4–6, 5–7
Win	11–7	Mar 1987	Rotterdam, Netherlands	Carpet (i)	(United States) John McEnroe	3–6, 6–3, 6–1
Win	12–7	Apr 1987	Tokyo Outdoor, Japan	Hard	(United States) David Pate	7–6^{(7–2)}, 6–4
Loss	12–8	Aug 1987	Båstad, Sweden (2)	Clay	(Sweden) Joakim Nyström	6–4, 0–6, 3–6
Loss	12–9	Aug 1987	Montreal, Canada	Hard	(Czechoslovakia) Ivan Lendl	4–6, 6–7^{(2–7)}
Win	13–9	Aug 1987	Cincinnati, US	Hard	(West Germany) Boris Becker	6–4, 6–1
Loss	13–10	Sep 1987	Los Angeles, US(3)	Hard	(United States) David Pate	4–6, 4–6
Win	14–10	Oct 1987	Tokyo Indoor, Japan	Carpet (i)	(Czechoslovakia) Ivan Lendl	6–7^{(4–7)}, 6–4, 6–4
Win	15–10	Nov 1987	Stockholm, Sweden (2)	Hard (i)	(Sweden) Jonas Svensson	7–5, 6–2, 4–6, 6–4
Win	16–10	Feb 1988	Rotterdam, Netherlands (2)	Carpet (i)	(Czechoslovakia) Miloslav Mečíř	7–6^{(7–5)}, 6–2
Loss	16–11	Apr 1988	Dallas WCT, US	Carpet (i)	(West Germany) Boris Becker	4–6, 6–1, 5–7, 2–6
Loss	16–12	Apr 1988	Tokyo Outdoor, Japan	Hard	(United States) John McEnroe	2–6, 2–6
Loss	16–13	Jun 1988	Queen's Club, London, UK	Grass	(West Germany) Boris Becker	1–6, 6–3, 3–6
Win	17–13	Jul 1988	Wimbledon, London, UK	Grass	(West Germany) Boris Becker	4–6, 7–6^{(7–2)}, 6–4, 6–2
Loss	17–14	Aug 1988	Cincinnati, US	Hard	(Sweden) Mats Wilander	6–3, 6–7^{(5–7)}, 6–7^{(5–7)}
Win	18–14	Oct 1988	Basel, Switzerland (3)	Hard (i)	(Switzerland) Jakob Hlasek	7–5, 6–3, 3–6, 6–2
Loss	18–15	Mar 1989	Scottsdale, US	Hard	(Czechoslovakia) Ivan Lendl	2–6, 3–6
Win	19–15	Apr 1989	Tokyo Outdoor, Japan (2)	Hard	(Czechoslovakia) Ivan Lendl	6–3, 2–6, 6–4
Loss	19–16	Jun 1989	French Open, Paris, France	Clay	(United States) Michael Chang	1–6, 6–3, 6–4, 4–6, 2–6
Loss	19–17	Jul 1989	Wimbledon, London, UK	Grass	(West Germany) Boris Becker	0–6, 6–7^{(1–7)}, 4–6
Loss	19–18	Aug 1989	Cincinnati, US(2)	Hard	(United States) Brad Gilbert	4–6, 6–2, 6–7^{(5–7)}
Loss	19–19	Oct 1989	Basel, Switzerland	Hard (i)	(United States) Jim Courier	6–7^{(6–8)}, 6–3, 6–2, 0–6, 5–7
Loss	19–20	Nov 1989	Paris Indoor, France	Carpet (i)	(West Germany) Boris Becker	4–6, 3–6, 3–6
Win	20–20	Dec 1989	Grand Prix Masters, New York, US	Carpet (i)	(West Germany) Boris Becker	4–6, 7–6^{(8–6)}, 6–3, 6–1
Loss	20–21	Jan 1990	Australian Open, Melbourne, Australia	Hard	(Czechoslovakia) Ivan Lendl	6–4, 6–7^{(3–7)}, 2–5, ret.
Win	21–21	Mar 1990	Indian Wells, US	Hard	(United States) Andre Agassi	6–4, 5–7, 7–6^{(7–1)}, 7–6^{(8–6)}
Loss	21–22	Mar 1990	Miami, US	Hard	(United States) Andre Agassi	1–6, 4–6, 6–0, 2–6
Win	22–22	Apr 1990	Tokyo Outdoor, Japan (3)	Hard	(United States) Aaron Krickstein	6–4, 7–5
Win	23–22	Jul 1990	Wimbledon, London, UK (2)	Grass	(West Germany) Boris Becker	6–2, 6–2, 3–6, 3–6, 6–4
Win	24–22	Aug 1990	Los Angeles, US	Hard	(United States) Michael Chang	7–6^{(7–4)}, 2–6, 7–6^{(7–3)}
Win	25–22	Aug 1990	Cincinnati, US(2)	Hard	(United States) Brad Gilbert	6–1, 6–1
Win	26–22	Aug 1990	Long Island, US	Hard	(Socialist Federal Republic of Yugoslavia) Goran Ivanišević	7–6^{(7–3)}, 6–3
Loss	26–23	Oct 1990	Sydney Indoor, Australia	Hard (i)	(West Germany) Boris Becker	6–7^{(4–7)}, 4–6, 4–6
Loss	26–24	Oct 1990	Stockholm, Sweden	Carpet (i)	(West Germany) Boris Becker	4–6, 0–6, 3–6
Win	27–24	Nov 1990	Paris Indoor, France	Carpet (i)	(Germany) Boris Becker	3–3, ret.
Loss	27–25	Nov 1990	ATP Tour World Championships, Germany	Carpet (i)	(United States) Andre Agassi	7–5, 6–7^{(5–7)}, 5–7, 2–6
Win	28–25	Feb 1991	Stuttgart Indoor, Germany	Carpet (i)	(Sweden) Jonas Svensson	6–2, 3–6, 7–5, 6–2
Win	29–25	Apr 1991	Tokyo Outdoor, Japan (4)	Hard	(Czechoslovakia) Ivan Lendl	6–1, 7–5, 6–0
Win	30–25	Jun 1991	Queen's Club, London, UK	Grass	(United States) David Wheaton	6–2, 6–3
Loss	30–26	Aug 1991	Long Island, US	Hard	(Czechoslovakia) Ivan Lendl	3–6, 2–6
Win	31–26	Sep 1991	US Open, New York City, US	Hard	(United States) Jim Courier	6–2, 6–4, 6–0
Win	32–26	Oct 1991	Sydney Indoor, Australia	Hard (i)	(United States) Brad Gilbert	6–2, 6–2, 6–2
Win	33–26	Oct 1991	Tokyo Indoor, Japan (2)	Carpet (i)	(United States) Derrick Rostagno	6–3, 1–6, 6–2
Loss	33–27	Oct 1991	Stockholm, Sweden (2)	Carpet (i)	(Germany) Boris Becker	6–3, 4–6, 6–1, 2–6, 2–6
Loss	33–28	Jan 1992	Australian Open, Melbourne, Australia (2)	Hard	(United States) Jim Courier	3–6, 6–3, 4–6, 2–6
Loss	33–29	Feb 1992	Stuttgart Indoor, Germany	Carpet (i)	(Croatia) Goran Ivanišević	7–6^{(7–5)}, 3–6, 4–6, 4–6
Win	34–29	May 1992	Hamburg, Germany	Clay	(Germany) Michael Stich	5–7, 6–4, 6–1
Win	35–29	Aug 1992	New Haven, US	Hard	(United States) MaliVai Washington	7–6^{(7–4)}, 6–1
Win	36–29	Sep 1992	US Open, New York City, US(2)	Hard	(United States) Pete Sampras	3–6, 6–4, 7–6^{(7–5)}, 6–2
Loss	36–30	Oct 1992	Sydney Indoor, Australia (2)	Hard (i)	(Croatia) Goran Ivanišević	4–6, 2–6, 4–6
Loss	36–31	Feb 1993	Australian Open, Melbourne, Australia (3)	Hard	(United States) Jim Courier	2–6, 1–6, 6–2, 5–7
Win	37–31	Apr 1993	Madrid, Spain	Clay	(Spain) Sergi Bruguera	6–3, 6–3, 6–2
Loss	37–32	Aug 1993	Cincinnati, US(3)	Hard	(United States) Michael Chang	5–7, 6–0, 4–6
Loss	37–33	Oct 1993	Basel, Switzerland	Hard (i)	(Germany) Michael Stich	4–6, 7–6^{(7–5)}, 3–6, 2–6
Win	38–33	Jan 1994	Doha, Qatar	Hard	(Netherlands) Paul Haarhuis	6–3, 6–2
Win	39–33	Feb 1994	Stuttgart Indoor, Germany (2)	Carpet (i)	(Croatia) Goran Ivanišević	4–6, 6–4, 6–2, 6–2
Win	40–33	Jul 1994	Washington, US	Hard	(Australia) Jason Stoltenberg	6–4, 6–2
Loss	40–34	Aug 1994	Cincinnati, US(4)	Hard	(United States) Michael Chang	2–6, 5–7
Win	41–34	Jan 1995	Doha, Qatar (2)	Hard	(Sweden) Magnus Larsson	7–6^{(7–4)}, 6–1
Loss	41–35	Jul 1995	Washington, US	Hard	(United States) Andre Agassi	4–6, 6–2, 5–7
Loss	41–36	Jun 1996	Queen's Club, London, UK (2)	Grass	(Germany) Boris Becker	4–6, 6–7^{(3–7)}

=== Doubles: 29 (18 titles / 11 runner-ups) ===
Result	W-L	Date	Tournament	Surface	Partner	Opponents	Score
Loss	0–1	1983	Basel, Switzerland	Hard (i)	(Romania) Florin Segărceanu	(Czechoslovakia) Pavel Složil (Czechoslovakia) Tomáš Šmíd	1–6, 6–3, 6–7
Win	1–1	1984	Hamburg, Germany	Clay	(Sweden) Anders Järryd	(Switzerland) Heinz Günthardt (Hungary) Balázs Taróczy	6–3, 6–1
Loss	1–2	1984	US Open, New York	Hard	(Sweden) Anders Järryd	(Australia) John Fitzgerald (Czechoslovakia) Tomáš Šmíd	6–7, 3–6, 3–6
Loss	1–3	1984	Basel, Switzerland	Hard (i)	(United States) Tim Wilkison	(Czechoslovakia) Pavel Složil (Czechoslovakia) Tomáš Šmíd	6–7, 2–6
Win	2–3	1985	Brussels, Belgium	Carpet	(Sweden) Anders Järryd	(South Africa) Kevin Curren (Poland) Wojtek Fibak	6–3, 7–6
Win	3–3	1985	Båstad, Sweden	Clay	(Sweden) Anders Järryd	(Spain) Sergio Casal (Spain) Emilio Sánchez	6–0, 7–6
Loss	3–4	1985	Montreal, Canada	Hard	(Sweden) Anders Järryd	(United States) Ken Flach (United States) Robert Seguso	7–5, 6–7, 3–6
Win	4–4	1985	Cincinnati, US	Hard	(Sweden) Anders Järryd	(Sweden) Joakim Nyström (Sweden) Mats Wilander	4–6, 6–2, 6–3
Win	5–4	1985	Grand Prix Masters, New York	Carpet	(Sweden) Anders Järryd	(Sweden) Joakim Nyström (Sweden) Mats Wilander	6–1, 7–6
Loss	5–5	1986	Philadelphia, US	Carpet	(Sweden) Anders Järryd	(United States) Scott Davis (United States) David Pate	6–7, 6–3, 3–6, 5–7
Loss	5–6	1986	Boca West, US	Hard	(Sweden) Anders Järryd	(United States) Brad Gilbert (United States) Vincent Van Patten	W/O
Win	6–6	1986	Rotterdam, Netherlands	Carpet	(Socialist Federal Republic of Yugoslavia) Slobodan Živojinović	(Poland) Wojtek Fibak (United States) Matt Mitchell	2–6, 6–3, 6–2
Loss	6–7	1986	French Open, Paris	Clay	(Sweden) Anders Järryd	(Australia) John Fitzgerald (Czechoslovakia) Tomáš Šmíd	6–3, 4–6, 6–3, 6–7, 12–14
Loss	6–8	1986	Gstaad, Switzerland	Clay	(Sweden) Joakim Nyström	(Spain) Sergio Casal (Spain) Emilio Sánchez	3–6, 6–3, 3–6
Win	7–8	1986	Los Angeles, US	Hard	(Sweden) Anders Järryd	(United States) Peter Fleming (United States) John McEnroe	3–6, 7–5, 7–6
Win	8–8	1986	Grand Prix Masters, London	Carpet	(Sweden) Anders Järryd	(France) Guy Forget (France) Yannick Noah	6–3, 7–6, 6–3
Win	9–8	1987	Australian Open, Melbourne	Grass	(Sweden) Anders Järryd	(Australia) Peter Doohan (Australia) Laurie Warder	6–4, 6–4, 7–6
Win	10–8	1987	Rotterdam, Netherlands	Carpet	(Sweden) Anders Järryd	(United States) Chip Hooper (United States) Mike Leach	3–6, 6–3, 6–4
Win	11–8	1987	Båstad, Sweden	Clay	(Sweden) Anders Järryd	(Spain) Emilio Sánchez (Spain) Javier Sánchez	7–6, 6–3
Win	12–8	1987	Montreal, Canada	Hard	(Australia) Pat Cash	(Australia) Peter Doohan (Australia) Laurie Warder	6–7, 6–3, 6–4
Win	13–8	1987	US Open, New York	Hard	(Sweden) Anders Järryd	(United States) Ken Flach (United States) Robert Seguso	7–6, 6–2, 4–6, 5–7, 7–6
Win	14–8	1987	Stockholm, Sweden	Hard (i)	(Sweden) Anders Järryd	(United States) Jim Grabb (United States) Jim Pugh	6–3, 6–4
Loss	14–9	1988	Båstad, Sweden	Clay	(Sweden) Niclas Kroon	(West Germany) Patrick Baur (West Germany) Udo Riglewski	7–6, 3–6, 6–7
Loss	14–10	1990	Sydney Indoor, Australia	Hard (i)	(Czechoslovakia) Ivan Lendl	(Australia) Broderick Dyke (Sweden) Peter Lundgren	2–6, 4–6
Win	15–10	1991	Tokyo Outdoor, Japan	Hard	(Australia) Todd Woodbridge	(Australia) John Fitzgerald (Sweden) Anders Järryd	6–4, 5–7, 6–4
Win	16–10	1993	Monte Carlo, Monaco	Clay	(Czech Republic) Petr Korda	(Netherlands) Paul Haarhuis (Netherlands) Mark Koevermans	3–6, 6–2, 7–6
Loss	16–11	1993	Cincinnati, US	Hard	(Sweden) Henrik Holm	(United States) Andre Agassi (Czech Republic) Petr Korda	6–7, 4–6
Win	17–11	1995	Doha, Qatar	Hard	(Sweden) Magnus Larsson	(Russia) Andrei Olhovskiy (Netherlands) Jan Siemerink	7–6, 6–2
Win	18–11	1996	Australian Open, Melbourne	Hard	(Czech Republic) Petr Korda	(Canada) Sébastien Lareau (United States) Alex O'Brien	7–5, 7–5, 4–6, 6–1

== Junior career finals ==
=== Grand Slam finals ===
==== Singles: 4 (4–0) ====
Result	Year	Championship	Surface	Opponent	Score
Win	1983	French Open	Clay	(France) Franck Février	2–6, 6–2, 6–1
Win	1983	Wimbledon	Grass	(Australia) John Frawley	6–3, 7–6
Win	1983	US Open	Hard	(Australia) Simon Youl	6–2, 6–4
Win	1983^{1}	Australian Open	Grass	(Australia) Simon Youl	6–4, 6–4

^{1} The 1983 Australian Open was held in December.

== Head-to-head record ==
Edberg's record against top 10 ranked players

- (Germany) Boris Becker 10–25
- (Czech Republic) Ivan Lendl 14–13
- (United States) Michael Chang 12–9
- (Sweden) Mats Wilander 9–11
- (United States) Brad Gilbert 15–4
- (Croatia) Goran Ivanišević 9–10
- (Switzerland) Jakob Hlasek 15–1
- (Germany) Michael Stich 6–10
- (Czech Republic) Miloslav Mečíř 10–5
- (United States) Pete Sampras 6–8
- (France) Guy Forget 7–6
- (United States) John McEnroe 6–7
- (Spain) Emilio Sánchez 9–3
- (United States) Jimmy Connors 6–6
- (Austria) Thomas Muster 10-0
- (Sweden) Anders Järryd 9–2
- (United States) Aaron Krickstein 7–4
- (Sweden) Jonas Svensson 10–0
- (Australia) Pat Cash 8–2
- (United States) Jim Courier 4–6
- (Spain) Sergi Bruguera 6–3
- (United States) Johan Kriek 6–3
- (Czech Republic) Petr Korda 4–5
- (United States) Andre Agassi 3–6
- (South Africa) Kevin Curren 7–1
- (United States) Jimmy Arias 7–0
- (France) Henri Leconte 6–1
- (Netherlands) Richard Krajicek 3–4
- (United States) Todd Martin 3–4
- (France) Yannick Noah 6–0
- (United States) Tim Mayotte 5–1
- (Ukraine) Andriy Medvedev 4–2
- (France) Cédric Pioline 4–2
- (Ecuador) Andrés Gómez 4–0
- (South Africa) Wayne Ferreira 3–1
- (Czech Republic) Karel Nováček 3–1
- (Australia) Patrick Rafter 3–0
- (Russia) Yevgeny Kafelnikov 1–2
- (Sweden) Joakim Nyström 0–3
- (United Kingdom) Tim Henman 2–0
- (Argentina) Alberto Mancini 2–0
- (Sweden) Henrik Sundström 1–1
- (Argentina) José Luis Clerc 1–0
- (Spain) Carlos Moyá 1–0
- (Chile) Marcelo Ríos 1–0
- (United Kingdom) Greg Rusedski 1–0
- (United States) Eliot Teltscher 1–0
- (Sweden) Jonas Björkman 0–1

== Top 10 wins ==
Season	1982	1983	1984	1985	1986	1987	1988	1989	1990	1991	1992	1993	1994	1995	1996	Total
Wins	0	0	3	8	8	12	9	11	16	5	7	5	7	1	7	99

#	Player	Rank	Event	Surface	Rd	Score	ER
1984
1.	(South Africa) Kevin Curren	9	Milan, Italy	Carpet (i)	QF	6–2, 7–5	53
2.	(Sweden) Mats Wilander	4	Milan, Italy	Carpet (i)	F	6–4, 6–2	53
3.	(United States) Jimmy Arias	6	Summer Olympics, Los Angeles, U.S.	Hard	SF	6–2, 6–1	26
1985
4.	(United States) Jimmy Connors	2	Memphis, U.S.	Carpet (i)	SF	6–1, 6–4	19
5.	(Czechoslovakia) Ivan Lendl	3	Delray Beach, U.S.	Hard	4R	6–4, 7–6	13
6.	(Sweden) Anders Järryd	6	WCT Finals, Dallas, U.S.	Carpet (i)	1R	1–6, 6–2, 6–2, 5–7, 6–3	17
7.	(United States) Kevin Curren	8	Las Vegas, U.S.	Hard	1R	6–1, 6–1	16
8.	(Sweden) Anders Järryd	6	French Open, Paris, France	Clay	4R	6–3, 6–7, 6–4, 6–2	18
9.	(France) Yannick Noah	5	Basel, Switzerland	Hard (i)	F	6–7, 6–4, 7–6, 6–1	8
10.	(Czechoslovakia) Ivan Lendl	1	Australian Open, Melbourne, Australia	Grass	SF	6–7, 7–5, 6–1, 4–6, 9–7	6
11.	(Sweden) Mats Wilander	3	Australian Open, Melbourne, Australia	Grass	F	6–4, 6–3, 6–3	6
1986
12.	(France) Yannick Noah	8	WCT Finals, Dallas, U.S.	Carpet (i)	QF	6–3, 7–6, 7–6	6
13.	(Czechoslovakia) Miloslav Mečíř	9	Davis Cup, Prague, Czechoslovakia	Clay	RR	6–4, 9–7	4
14.	(France) Yannick Noah	6	Basel, Switzerland	Hard (i)	F	7–6, 6–2, 6–7, 7–6	4
15.	(Czechoslovakia) Ivan Lendl	1	Tokyo, Japan	Carpet (i)	SF	7–5, 6–1	4
16.	(France) Henri Leconte	5	Stockholm, Sweden	Hard (i)	SF	6–7, 6–4, 7–6	3
17.	(Sweden) Mats Wilander	4	Stockholm, Sweden	Hard (i)	F	6–2, 6–1, 6–1	3
18.	(France) Yannick Noah	5	Masters, New York, U.S.	Carpet (i)	RR	4–6, 6–3, 7–6	4
19.	(Ecuador) Andrés Gómez	10	Masters, New York, U.S.	Carpet (i)	RR	6–2, 6–3	4
1987
20.	(Czechoslovakia) Miloslav Mečíř	9	Australian Open, Melbourne, Australia	Grass	QF	6–1, 6–4, 6–4	5
21.	(United States) Jimmy Connors	8	Memphis, U.S.	Hard (i)	F	6–3, 2–1, ret.	2
22.	(Czechoslovakia) Miloslav Mečíř	9	Indian Wells, U.S.	Hard	QF	4–6, 6–4, 6–2	2
23.	(Sweden) Mats Wilander	5	Indian Wells, U.S.	Hard	SF	6–1, 7–5	2
24.	(United States) Tim Mayotte	10	WCT Finals, Dallas, U.S.	Carpet (i)	QF	6–2, 7–5, 6–7, 3–6, 6–1	3
25.	(West Germany) Boris Becker	4	Montreal, Canada	Hard	SF	6–2, 6–4	3
26.	(United States) Jimmy Connors	6	Cincinnati, U.S.	Hard	SF	6–2, 6–3	3
27.	(West Germany) Boris Becker	4	Cincinnati, U.S.	Hard	F	6–4, 6–1	3
28.	(Czechoslovakia) Ivan Lendl	1	Tokyo, Japan	Carpet (i)	F	6–7, 6–4, 6–4	2
29.	(Sweden) Mats Wilander	3	Masters, New York, U.S.	Carpet (i)	RR	6–2, 7–6	2
30.	(Czechoslovakia) Miloslav Mečíř	6	Masters, New York, U.S.	Carpet (i)	RR	6–3, 6–3	2
31.	(Australia) Pat Cash	7	Masters, New York, U.S.	Carpet (i)	RR	6–4, 4–6, 6–1	2
1988
32.	(Czechoslovakia) Miloslav Mečíř	6	Rotterdam, Netherlands	Carpet (i)	F	7–6, 6–2	2
33.	(France) Yannick Noah	8	WCT Finals, Dallas, U.S.	Carpet (i)	SF	6–2, 4–6, 6–3, 6–3	3
34.	(Czechoslovakia) Miloslav Mečíř	7	Davis Cup, Norrköping, Sweden	Carpet (i)	RR	4–6, 6–1, 4–6, 6–4, 9–7	3
35.	(United States) Tim Mayotte	9	Tokyo, Japan	Hard	SF	6–2, 6–2	3
36.	(United States) Tim Mayotte	10	World Team Cup, Düsseldorf, West Germany	Clay	F	6–4, 6–2	2
37.	(Czechoslovakia) Miloslav Mečíř	7	Wimbledon, London, United Kingdom	Grass	SF	4–6, 2–6, 6–4, 6–3, 6–4	3
38.	(West Germany) Boris Becker	8	Wimbledon, London, United Kingdom	Grass	F	4–6, 7–6, 6–4, 6–2	3
39.	(Sweden) Mats Wilander	1	Masters, New York, U.S.	Carpet (i)	RR	6–2, 6–2	5
40.	(West Germany) Boris Becker	4	Masters, New York, U.S.	Carpet (i)	RR	7–6, 3–6, 6–4	5
1989
41.	(United States) John McEnroe	9	Tokyo, Japan	Hard	SF	6–4, 6–3	5
42.	(Czechoslovakia) Ivan Lendl	1	Tokyo, Japan	Hard	F	6–3, 2–6, 6–4	5
43.	(Czechoslovakia) Miloslav Mečíř	10	World Team Cup, Düsseldorf, West Germany	Clay	RR	2–6, 6–3, 6–4	3
44.	(West Germany) Boris Becker	2	French Open, Paris, France	Clay	SF	6–3, 6–4, 5–7, 3–6, 6–2	3
45.	(United States) John McEnroe	8	Wimbledon, London, United Kingdom	Grass	SF	7–5, 7–6, 7–6	3
46.	(Sweden) Mats Wilander	4	Cincinnati, U.S.	Hard	SF	7–6, 7–6	3
47.	(United States) Aaron Krickstein	8	Paris, France	Carpet (i)	SF	6–4, 4–6, 6–2	3
48.	(United States) Brad Gilbert	6	Masters, New York, U.S.	Carpet (i)	RR	6–1, 6–3	3
49.	(United States) Andre Agassi	7	Masters, New York, U.S.	Carpet (i)	RR	6–4, 6–2	3
50.	(Czechoslovakia) Ivan Lendl	1	Masters, New York, U.S.	Carpet (i)	SF	7–6, 7–5	3
51.	(West Germany) Boris Becker	2	Masters, New York, U.S.	Carpet (i)	F	4–6, 7–6, 6–3, 6–1	3
1990
52.	(United States) Andre Agassi	8	Indian Wells, U.S.	Hard	F	6–4, 5–7, 7–6, 7–6	3
53.	(United States) Brad Gilbert	5	Tokyo, Japan	Hard	SF	6–1, 7–6	2
54.	(United States) Aaron Krickstein	7	Tokyo, Japan	Hard	F	6–4, 7–5	2
55.	(Austria) Thomas Muster	9	World Team Cup, Düsseldorf, West Germany	Clay	RR	6–2, 6–4	2
56.	(Czechoslovakia) Ivan Lendl	1	Wimbledon, London, United Kingdom	Grass	SF	6–1, 7–6, 6–3	3
57.	(West Germany) Boris Becker	2	Wimbledon, London, United Kingdom	Grass	F	6–2, 6–2, 3–6, 3–6, 6–4	3
58.	(United States) Michael Chang	10	Cincinnati, U.S.	Hard	QF	3–6, 6–3, 6–4	2
59.	(Ecuador) Andrés Gómez	5	Cincinnati, U.S.	Hard	SF	7–5, 6–3	2
60.	(United States) Brad Gilbert	7	Cincinnati, U.S.	Hard	F	6–1, 6–1	2
61.	(Czechoslovakia) Ivan Lendl	3	Sydney, Australia	Hard (i)	SF	3–6, 7–6, 6–3	1
62.	(United States) Brad Gilbert	10	Stockholm, Sweden	Carpet (i)	QF	6–4, 3–6, 6–1	1
63.	(Germany) Boris Becker	2	Paris, France	Carpet (i)	F	3–3, ret.	1
64.	(Spain) Emilio Sánchez	8	ATP Tour World Championships, Frankfurt, Germany	Carpet (i)	RR	6–7, 6–3, 6–1	1
65.	(United States) Andre Agassi	4	ATP Tour World Championships, Frankfurt, Germany	Carpet (i)	RR	7–6, 4–6, 7–6	1
66.	(United States) Pete Sampras	5	ATP Tour World Championships, Frankfurt, Germany	Carpet (i)	RR	7–5, 6–4	1
67.	(Czechoslovakia) Ivan Lendl	3	ATP Tour World Championships, Frankfurt, Germany	Carpet (i)	SF	6–4, 6–2	1
1991
68.	(Spain) Emilio Sánchez	8	Miami, U.S.	Hard	QF	6–2, 7–6^{(8–6)}	1
69.	(Czechoslovakia) Ivan Lendl	3	Tokyo, Japan	Hard	F	6–1, 7–5, 6–0	1
70.	(Socialist Federal Republic of Yugoslavia) Goran Ivanišević	8	World Team Cup, Düsseldorf, Germany	Clay	F	6–4, 7–5	1
71.	(Czechoslovakia) Ivan Lendl	3	US Open, New York, U.S.	Hard	SF	6–3, 6–3, 6–4	2
72.	(United States) Jim Courier	5	US Open, New York, U.S.	Hard	F	6–2, 6–4, 6–0	2
1992
73.	(Czechoslovakia) Ivan Lendl	4	Australian Open, Melbourne, Australia	Hard	QF	4–6, 7–5, 6–1, 6–7^{(5–7)}, 6–1	1
74.	(Germany) Michael Stich	5	Hamburg, Germany	Clay	F	5–7, 6–4, 6–1	2
75.	(United States) Ivan Lendl	7	New Haven, U.S.	Hard	SF	7–6^{(7–2)}, 4–6, 6–3	2
76.	(United States) Ivan Lendl	7	US Open, New York, U.S.	Hard	QF	6–3, 6–3, 3–6, 5–7, 7–6^{(7–3)}	2
77.	(United States) Michael Chang	4	US Open, New York, U.S.	Hard	SF	6–7^{(3–7)}, 7–5, 7–6^{(7–3)}, 5–7, 6–4	2
78.	(United States) Pete Sampras	3	US Open, New York, U.S.	Hard	F	3–6, 6–4, 7–6^{(7–5)}, 6–2	2
79.	(Czechoslovakia) Petr Korda	6	ATP Tour World Championships, Frankfurt, Germany	Carpet (i)	RR	6–3, 7–6^{(11–9)}	2
1993
80.	(United States) Pete Sampras	3	Australian Open, Melbourne, Australia	Hard	SF	7–6^{(7–5)}, 6–3, 7–6^{(7–3)}	2
81.	(Spain) Sergi Bruguera	9	Madrid, Spain	Clay	F	6–3, 6–3, 6–2	3
82.	(United States) Pete Sampras	1	Cincinnati, U.S.	Hard	SF	6–7^{(3–7)}, 7–5, 7–6^{(7–5)}	3
83.	(Germany) Michael Stich	3	Paris, France	Carpet (i)	QF	6–2, 5–7, 6–2	6
84.	(Spain) Sergi Bruguera	4	ATP Tour World Championships, Frankfurt, Germany	Carpet (i)	RR	6–2, 6–4	5
1994
85.	(Austria) Thomas Muster	10	Australian Open, Melbourne, Australia	Hard	QF	6–2, 6–3, 6–4	4
86.	(Sweden) Magnus Gustafsson	10	Stuttgart, Germany	Carpet (i)	QF	6–3, 2–6, 6–3	5
87.	(Spain) Sergi Bruguera	4	Stuttgart, Germany	Carpet (i)	SF	4–6, 6–3, 6–2	5
88.	(Croatia) Goran Ivanišević	7	Stuttgart, Germany	Carpet (i)	F	4–6, 6–4, 6–2, 6–2	5
89.	(Germany) Michael Stich	5	Cincinnati, U.S.	Hard	SF	6–2, 7–6^{(8–6)}	4
90.	(United States) Pete Sampras	1	Davis Cup, Gothenburg, Sweden	Carpet (i)	RR	6–3, ret.	5
91.	(Croatia) Goran Ivanišević	4	ATP Tour World Championships, Frankfurt, Germany	Carpet (i)	RR	6–3, 6–4	8
1995
92.	(Spain) Alberto Berasategui	7	Indian Wells, U.S.	Hard	3R	6–1, 6–2	16
1996
93.	(Croatia) Goran Ivanišević	6	Rome, Italy	Clay	3R	6–4, 6–2	54
94.	(United States) Michael Chang	4	French Open, Paris, France	Clay	3R	4–6, 7–5, 6–0, 7–6^{(7–1)}	45
95.	(Croatia) Goran Ivanišević	7	Queen's Club, London, United Kingdom	Grass	3R	6–7^{(3–7)}, 6–2, 7–6^{(7–4)}	26
96.	(Austria) Thomas Muster	2	Queen's Club, London, United Kingdom	Grass	SF	6–7^{(2–7)}, 6–3, 6–2	26
97.	(Netherlands) Richard Krajicek	8	US Open, New York, U.S.	Hard	1R	6–3, 6–3, 6–3	28
98.	(Austria) Thomas Muster	3	Vienna, Austria	Carpet (i)	2R	6–4, 6–7^{(2–7)}, 7–5	21
99.	(Austria) Thomas Muster	6	Paris, France	Carpet (i)	2R	6–2, ret.	18
