= Becker–Edberg rivalry =

Tennis rivalry in the 1980s and 1990s

The Becker–Edberg rivalry was a tennis rivalry between Boris Becker and Stefan Edberg, who met 35 times between 1984 and 1996. Although Becker led their overall head-to-head 25–10 and won all three of their Davis Cup matches, Edberg won three of their four meetings in Grand Slams. Edberg and Becker also reached the championship match of the 1989 World Tour Finals, which Edberg won in four sets. Edberg led their five-set matches at 2–1.

The most defining aspect of their rivalry was the three successive Wimbledon finals that they played. In the 1988 meeting, Becker was the huge favorite, and stormed to the first set 6–4. The second set was to be the most memorable, when in a fit of courage and tennis acumen Edberg won a tight set in a tiebreaker 7–2. Edberg went on to win the next two sets 6–4, 6–2 to win his first Wimbledon title and deny Becker a third title in four years. In the 1989 meeting, Becker, having lost to Edberg a month earlier in the French Open semifinals, raced to win the first set 6–0. The second set was closer, but won in a tiebreak by Becker 7–1 after saving 3 set points (Edberg led 6-5 40-0 and service). Becker went on to win the third set 6–4. This was Becker's third Wimbledon title, which would be his last Wimbledon crown. In the 1990 meeting, Edberg won the first two sets 6–2, 6–2. However, Becker rallied to win the next two sets 6–3, 6–3. Becker broke Edberg early in the fifth set, setting up the possibility of being the first Wimbledon champion since Henri Cochet in 1927 to win the final after losing the first two sets. Yet, this was not to be as Edberg regained the break and then broke Becker in the ninth game of the set with a topspin lob winner, eventually serving it out for a second Wimbledon championship.

Following his 2009 Wimbledon final (where he broke the all-time record for most men's singles Grand Slam titles), Roger Federer in the post-match press conference cited the Becker–Edberg rivalry in Wimbledon finals as his inspiration for choosing to play tennis over soccer. Becker and Edberg continued their rivalry as coaches through the Djokovic–Federer rivalry, with Becker coaching Novak Djokovic and Edberg coaching Federer starting from the 2014 season. Federer and Edberg parted ways at the end of 2015. Djokovic and Becker split the year after.

== Head-to-head ==
Legend	Becker	Edberg
Grand Slam	1	3
ATP Tour Finals	4	2
WCT Finals	2	0
ATP Masters Series	2	1
ATP International Series	13	4
Davis Cup	3	0
Total	25	10

=== Singles (35) ===
Becker 25 – Edberg 10

No.	Year	Tournament	Surface	Round	Winner	Score	Becker	Edberg
1.	1984	Cologne Grand Prix	Hard (i)	Last 32	Edberg	6–4, 6–4	0	1
2.	1985	US Pro Indoor	Carpet	Last 32	Edberg	6–3, 6–1	0	2
3.	1985	Alan King Tennis Classic	Hard	Last 16	Becker	6–3, 6–7^{(3–7)}, 6–2	1	2
4.	1985	Davis Cup	Carpet	Final	Becker	6–3, 3–6, 7–5, 8–6	2	2
5.	1986	WCT Finals	Carpet	Semifinals	Becker	7–6^{(7–4)}, 7–6^{(9–7)}, 4–6, 7–6^{(7–2)}	3	2
6.	1986	Canadian Open	Hard	Final	Becker	6–4, 3–6, 6–3	4	2
7.	1986	Tokyo Indoor	Carpet	Final	Becker	7–6^{(7–5)}, 6–1	5	2
8.	1986	Masters Grand Prix	Carpet	Semifinals	Becker	6–4, 6–4	6	2
9.	1987	Indian Wells Masters	Hard	Final	Becker	6–4, 6–4, 7–5	7	2
10.	1987	Canadian Open	Hard	Semifinals	Edberg	6–2, 6–4	7	3
11.	1987	Cincinnati Open	Hard	Final	Edberg	6–4, 6–1	7	4
12.	1988	WCT Finals	Carpet	Final	Becker	6–4, 1–6, 7–5, 6–2	8	4
13.	1988	Queen's Club Championships	Grass	Final	Becker	6–1, 3–6, 6–3	9	4
14.	1988	Wimbledon	Grass	Final	Edberg	4–6, 7–6^{(7–2)}, 6–4, 6–2	9	5
15.	1988	Masters Grand Prix	Carpet	Round Robin	Edberg	7–6^{(7–5)}, 3–6, 6–4	9	6
16.	1988	Davis Cup	Clay	Final	Becker	6–3, 6–1, 6–4	10	6
17.	1989	French Open	Clay	Semifinals	Edberg	6–3, 6–4, 5–7, 3–6, 6–2	10	7
18.	1989	Wimbledon	Grass	Final	Becker	6–0, 7–6^{(7–1)}, 6–4	11	7
19.	1989	Paris Open	Carpet	Final	Becker	6–4, 6–3, 6–3	12	7
20.	1989	Masters Grand Prix	Carpet	Round Robin	Becker	6–1, 6–4	13	7
21.	1989	Masters Grand Prix	Carpet	Final	Edberg	4–6, 7–6^{(8–6)}, 6–3, 6–1	13	8
22.	1989	Davis Cup	Carpet	Final	Becker	6–2, 6–2, 6–4	14	8
23.	1990	Queen's Club Championships	Grass	Semifinals	Becker	6–4, 6–4	15	8
24.	1990	Wimbledon	Grass	Final	Edberg	6–2, 6–2, 3–6, 3–6, 6–4	15	9
25.	1990	Sydney Indoor	Hard (i)	Final	Becker	7–6^{(7–4)}, 6–4, 6–4	16	9
26.	1990	Stockholm Open	Carpet	Final	Becker	6–4, 6–0, 6–3	17	9
27.	1990	Paris Open	Carpet	Final	Edberg	3–3 RET	17	10
28.	1991	Stockholm Open	Carpet	Final	Becker	3–6, 6–4, 1–6, 6–2, 6–2	18	10
29.	1992	Brussels Indoor	Carpet	Semifinals	Becker	4–6, 6–4, 6–2	19	10
30.	1992	ATP Tour World Championships	Carpet	Round Robin	Becker	6–4, 6–0	20	10
31.	1993	Qatar Open	Hard	Semifinals	Becker	6–4, 6–4	21	10
32.	1994	ATP Tour World Championships	Carpet	Round Robin	Becker	6–7^{(3–7)}, 6–4, 7–5	22	10
33.	1995	Swiss Indoors	Hard (i)	Quarterfinals	Becker	6–4, 3–6, 6–3	23	10
34.	1996	Qatar Open	Hard	Last 32	Becker	6–2, 7–5	24	10
35.	1996	Queen's Club Championships	Grass	Final	Becker	6–4, 7–6^{(7–3)}	25	10

== Breakdown of their rivalry ==
- All matches:(35) Becker 25–10
- All finals: Becker 11–5
  - Carpet courts: Becker 13–4
  - Clay courts: Tied 1–1
  - Grass courts: Becker 4–2
  - Hard courts: Becker 7–3
  - Davis Cup matches: Becker 3–0
  - Grand Slam finals: Edberg 2–1
  - Grand Slam matches: Edberg 3–1
  - Masters Series finals: Becker 2–1
  - Masters Series matches: Becker 2–1
  - Year-End Championships finals: Edberg 1–0
  - Year-End Championships matches: Becker 4–2

== ATP rankings ==
=== Year-end ranking timeline ===
Player	1982	1983	1984	1985	1986	1987	1988	1989	1990	1991	1992	1993	1994	1995	1996	1997	1998	1999
(Germany) Boris Becker		563	66	6	2	5	4	2	2	3	5	11	3	4	6	62	69	131
(Sweden) Stefan Edberg	523	53	20	5	5	2	5	3	1	1	2	5	7	23	14			

=== Combined singles performance timeline (best result) ===
Tournament	1983	1984	1985	1986	1987	1988	1989	1990	1991	1992	1993	1994	1995	1996	1997	1998	1999	SR
Grand Slam tournaments
Australian Open	2R	QF	W	NH	W	SF	QF	F	W	F	F	SF	4R	W	1R	A	A	4 / 14
French Open	A	2R	QF	QF	SF	4R	F	1R	SF	3R	QF	1R	3R	4R	A	A	A	0 / 13
Wimbledon	2R	3R	W	W	SF	W	W	W	F	QF	SF	SF	F	3R	QF	A	4R	5 / 16
US Open	1R	2R	4R	SF	SF	4R	W	SF	W	W	4R	3R	SF	QF	A	A	A	3 / 14

== See also ==
- List of tennis rivalries
