= 1995 Qatar Open =

- Date: 2–9 January
- Edition: 3rd
- Category: World Series
- Draw: 32S / 16D
- Prize money: $600,000
- Surface: Hard / outdoor
- Location: Doha, Qatar

Champions

Singles
- (Sweden) Stefan Edberg

Doubles
- (Sweden) Stefan Edberg / (Sweden) Magnus Larsson
← 1994 ·	ATP Qatar Open	· 1996 →

The 1995 Qatar Open, known as the 1995 Qatar Mobil Open for sponsorship reasons, was a men's tennis ATP tournament held in Doha, Qatar and played on outdoor hard courts. The event was part of the World Series of the 1995 ATP Tour. It was the third edition of the tournament and was held from 2 January through 9 January 1995.

First-seeded Stefan Edberg won the singles title, his second win in Doha, having won the singles title in 1994.

== Finals ==
=== Singles ===
(Sweden) Stefan Edberg defeated (Sweden) Magnus Larsson, 7–6^{(7–4)}, 6–1

- It was Edberg's only singles title of the year, and the 41st and last of his career.

=== Doubles ===
(Sweden) Stefan Edberg / (Sweden) Magnus Larsson defeated (Russia) Andrei Olhovskiy / (Netherlands) Jan Siemerink, 7–6, 6–2
