= 1995 Qatar Open – Singles =

Singles
- 1995 Qatar Open

Final
- Champion: (Sweden) Stefan Edberg
- Runner-up: (Sweden) Magnus Larsson
- Score: 7–6^{(7–4)}, 6–1

Details
- Draw: 32
- Seeds: 8

Events
Singles	Doubles
← 1994 ·	ATP Qatar Open	· 1996 →

Stefan Edberg defeated Magnus Larsson 7–6^{(7–4)}, 6–1 to win the 1995 Qatar Open singles competition. Edberg was the defending champion.

== Seeds ==
1. (Sweden) Stefan Edberg (champion)
2. (Germany) Michael Stich (semifinals)
3. (Sweden) Magnus Larsson (final)
4. (Netherlands) Jacco Eltingh (first round)
5. (Russia) Alexander Volkov (first round)
6. (Germany) Bernd Karbacher (first round)
7. (Netherlands) Paul Haarhuis (first round)
8. (France) Guy Forget (second round)

== Draw ==
=== Key ===
- Q = Qualifier
- WC = Wild card
- LL = Lucky loser
- Alt = Alternate
- SE = Special exempt
- PR = Protected ranking
- ITF = ITF entry
- JE = Junior exempt
- w/o = Walkover
- r = Retired
- d = Defaulted
- SR = Special ranking

=== Finals ===
Semifinals
1	(Sweden) Stefan Edberg	6	7^{7}
(France) Henri Leconte	2	6^{5}
3	(Sweden) Magnus Larsson	6	6
2	(Germany) Michael Stich	3	2

Final
1	(Sweden) Stefan Edberg	7^{7}	6
3	(Sweden) Magnus Larsson	6^{5}	1

=== Section 1 ===
First round
1	(Sweden) S Edberg	6	7^{10}
(Haiti) R Agénor	2	6^{8}
(United States) J Tarango	7^{7}	6^{5}	3
Q	(Romania) A Voinea	6^{4}	7^{7}	6
WC	(Morocco) Y El Aynaoui	2	6	7^{7}
(Sweden) L Jönsson	6	4	6^{4}
(Morocco) K Alami	5	6	7
7	(Netherlands) P Haarhuis	7	3	5
4	(Netherlands) J Eltingh	6	2	3
(Spain) J Sánchez	3	6	6
(Germany) K Braasch	3	6	6
Q	(Hungary) S Noszály	6	3	2
Q	(Belgium) F Dewulf	6	4	6
WC	(Germany) P Kühnen	3	6	1
(France) H Leconte	4	7^{8}	7
5	(Russia) A Volkov	6	6^{6}	5

Second round
1	(Sweden) S Edberg	6^{8}	6	6
Q	(Romania) A Voinea	7^{10}	3	3
WC	(Morocco) Y El Aynaoui	5	3
(Morocco) K Alami	7	6
(Spain) J Sánchez	6^{2}	6	6
(Germany) K Braasch	7^{7}	0	4
Q	(Belgium) F Dewulf	3	6^{1}
(France) H Leconte	6	7^{7}

Quarterfinals
1	(Sweden) S Edberg	6	6
(Morocco) K Alami	1	1
(Spain) J Sánchez	4	6	6
(France) H Leconte	6	4	3

Semifinals
1	(Sweden) S Edberg	6	7^{7}
(France) H Leconte	2	6^{5}

=== Section 2 ===
First round
6	(Germany) B Karbacher	6	3	4
(Germany) M Zoecke	4	6	6
WC	(Japan) S Matsuoka	7^{7}	6
(Sweden) J Apell	6^{3}	4
(Sweden) J Björkman	7	6
(Germany) A Mronz	5	2
(Slovakia) K Kučera	1	4
3	(Sweden) M Larsson	6	6
8	(France) G Forget	7	6
(United States) P McEnroe	5	2
(Russia) A Olhovskiy	1	2
(Netherlands) J Siemerink	6	6
(Austria) G Schaller	6	6^{1}	2
Q	(Germany) O Gross	4	7^{7}	6
(France) O Delaître	3	5
2	(Germany) M Stich	6	7

Second round
(Germany) M Zoecke	6	6
WC	(Japan) S Matsuoka	1	3
(Sweden) J Björkman	2	6^{4}
3	(Sweden) M Larsson	6	7^{7}
8	(France) G Forget	3	6^{5}
(Netherlands) J Siemerink	6	7^{7}
Q	(Germany) O Gross	4	5
2	(Germany) M Stich	6	7

Quarterfinals
(Germany) M Zoecke	6^{7}	6	3
3	(Sweden) M Larsson	7^{9}	4	6
(Netherlands) J Siemerink	3	1
2	(Germany) M Stich	6	6

Semifinals
3	(Sweden) M Larsson	6	6
2	(Germany) M Stich	3	2
