= 1996 Qatar Open – Doubles =

Doubles
- 1996 Qatar Open

Final
- Champions: (The Bahamas) Mark Knowles (Canada) Daniel Nestor
- Runners-up: (Netherlands) Jacco Eltingh (Netherlands) Paul Haarhuis
- Score: 7–6, 6–3

Details
- Draw: 16
- Seeds: 4

Events
Singles	Doubles
← 1995 ·	ATP Qatar Open	· 1997 →

Stefan Edberg and Magnus Larsson were the defending champions but only Edberg competed that year with Petr Korda.

Edberg and Korda lost in the quarterfinals to Patrick Galbraith and Andrei Olhovskiy.

Mark Knowles and Daniel Nestor won in the final 7–6, 6–3 against Jacco Eltingh and Paul Haarhuis.

== Seeds ==
1. (Netherlands) Jacco Eltingh / (Netherlands) Paul Haarhuis (final)
2. (The Bahamas) Mark Knowles / (Canada) Daniel Nestor (champions)
3. (United States) Patrick Galbraith / (Russia) Andrei Olhovskiy (semifinals)
4. (United States) Rick Leach / (United States) Scott Melville (first round)

== Draw ==
=== Key ===
- Q = Qualifier
- WC = Wild card
- LL = Lucky loser
- Alt = Alternate
- ITF = ITF entry
- PR = Protected ranking
- SR = Special ranking
- SE = Special exempt
- JE = Junior exempt
- JR = Junior Accelerator Programme entrant
- CO = College Accelerator Programme entrant
- NG = Next Gen Accelerator Program entrant
- w/o = Walkover
- r = Retired
- d = Defaulted

First round
1	(Netherlands) J Eltingh (Netherlands) P Haarhuis	6	6
WC	(Italy) A Gaudenzi (Austria) T Muster	2	3
(South Africa) J-L de Jager (France) G Raoux	6	6	6
(Spain) T Carbonell (Spain) F Roig	7	3	4
4	(United States) R Leach (United States) S Melville	2	6	3
(United States) M Keil (United States) J Tarango	6	4	6
(Sweden) J Apell (Sweden) P Nyborg	7	6	2
Q	(Germany) M-K Goellner (Germany) D Prinosil	6	7	6
(Netherlands) M Oosting (Netherlands) J Siemerink	3	6	3
WC	(Sweden) S Edberg (Czech Republic) P Korda	6	3	6
(United Kingdom) N Broad (South Africa) P Norval	5	6	6
3	(United States) P Galbraith (Russia) A Olhovskiy	7	4	7
WC	(Germany) B Becker (Germany) P Kühnen	6	7
(South Africa) L Bale (Belgium) L Pimek	1	5
(Venezuela) N Pereira (Spain) J Sánchez	6	2	4
2	(The Bahamas) M Knowles (Canada) D Nestor	3	6	6

Quarterfinals
1	(Netherlands) J Eltingh (Netherlands) P Haarhuis	6	6
(South Africa) J-L de Jager (France) G Raoux	4	2
(United States) M Keil (United States) J Tarango	6	4	4
Q	(Germany) M-K Goellner (Germany) D Prinosil	1	6	6
WC	(Sweden) S Edberg (Czech Republic) P Korda	2	3
3	(United States) P Galbraith (Russia) A Olhovskiy	6	6
WC	(Germany) B Becker (Germany) P Kühnen	1	6
2	(The Bahamas) M Knowles (Canada) D Nestor	6	7

Semifinals
1	(Netherlands) J Eltingh (Netherlands) P Haarhuis	7	5	7
Q	(Germany) M-K Goellner (Germany) D Prinosil	5	7	6
3	(United States) P Galbraith (Russia) A Olhovskiy	7	4	2
2	(The Bahamas) M Knowles (Canada) D Nestor	5	6	6

Final
1	(Netherlands) J Eltingh (Netherlands) P Haarhuis	6	3
2	(The Bahamas) M Knowles (Canada) D Nestor	7	6
