= 1995 Qatar Open – Doubles =

Doubles
- 1995 Qatar Open

Final
- Champions: (Sweden) Stefan Edberg (Sweden) Magnus Larsson
- Runners-up: (Russia) Andrei Olhovskiy (Netherlands) Jan Siemerink
- Score: 7–6, 6–2

Details
- Draw: 16
- Seeds: 4

Events
| Singles | Doubles |
| ← 1994 · | ATP Qatar Open | · 1996 → |

Olivier Delaître and Stéphane Simian were the defending champions, but did not participate together this year. Delaître partnered Guy Forget, losing in the semifinals. Simian did not participate this year.

Stefan Edberg and Magnus Larsson won in the final 7–6, 6–2, against Andrei Olhovskiy and Jan Siemerink.

== Seeds ==
1. (Netherlands) Jacco Eltingh / (Netherlands) Paul Haarhuis (semifinals)
2. (Sweden) Jan Apell / (Sweden) Jonas Björkman (first round)
3. (Netherlands) Hendrik Jan Davids / (Netherlands) Menno Oosting (quarterfinals)
4. (Russia) Andrei Olhovskiy / (Netherlands) Jan Siemerink (final)

== Draw ==
=== Key ===
- Q = Qualifier
- WC = Wild card
- LL = Lucky loser
- Alt = Alternate
- SE = Special exempt
- PR = Protected ranking
- ITF = ITF entry
- JE = Junior exempt
- w/o = Walkover
- r = Retired
- d = Defaulted
- SR = Special ranking

=== Draw ===
First round
1 | (Netherlands) J Eltingh (Netherlands) P Haarhuis | 6 | 6
WC | (Germany) P Kühnen (Germany) A Mronz | 1 | 4
(United States) F Montana (South Africa) B Talbot | 6 | 7
(United States) L Jensen (United States) M Jensen | 3 | 5
4 | (Russia) A Olhovskiy (Netherlands) J Siemerink | 3 | 6 | 6
(Germany) U Riglewski (Spain) J Sánchez | 6 | 1 | 3
(United States) P McEnroe (United States) J Tarango | 6 | 5 | 6
Q | (Belgium) X Daufresne (Belgium) F Dewulf | 3 | 7 | 4
WC | (Haiti) R Agénor (France) H Leconte | 1 | 2
(Sweden) S Edberg (Sweden) M Larsson | 6 | 6
WC | (Morocco) K Alami (Egypt) T El-Sawy | 6 | 5
3 | (Netherlands) HJ Davids (Netherlands) M Oosting | 7 | 7
(United States) S Cannon (United States) J Pugh | 3 | 6
(France) O Delaître (France) G Forget | 6 | 7
(South Africa) L Bale (South Africa) J-L de Jager | 6 | 7
2 | (Sweden) J Apell (Sweden) J Björkman | 2 | 6

Quarterfinals
1 | (Netherlands) J Eltingh (Netherlands) P Haarhuis | 6 | 7
(United States) F Montana (South Africa) B Talbot | 3 | 6
4 | (Russia) A Olhovskiy (Netherlands) J Siemerink | 2 | 6 | 6
(United States) P McEnroe (United States) J Tarango | 6 | 1 | 4
(Sweden) S Edberg (Sweden) M Larsson | 6 | 6
3 | (Netherlands) HJ Davids (Netherlands) M Oosting | 3 | 2
(France) O Delaître (France) G Forget | 7 | 7
(South Africa) L Bale (South Africa) J-L de Jager | 6 | 5

Semifinals
1 | (Netherlands) J Eltingh (Netherlands) P Haarhuis | 5 | 5
4 | (Russia) A Olhovskiy (Netherlands) J Siemerink | 7 | 7
(Sweden) S Edberg (Sweden) M Larsson | 6 | 7
(France) O Delaître (France) G Forget | 3 | 6

Final
4 | (Russia) A Olhovskiy (Netherlands) J Siemerink | 6 | 2
(Sweden) S Edberg (Sweden) M Larsson | 7 | 6
