= Ken Flach =

American tennis player (1963–2018)

- Country (sports): United States
- Born: May 24, 1963 St. Louis, Missouri, US
- Died: March 12, 2018 (aged 54) San Francisco, California, US
- Height: 6 ft 1 in (185 cm)
- Turned pro: 1983
- Retired: 1996 (Note: Brief periods of activity after retiring, incl. winning two Senior Wimbledon titles with Robert Seguso.)
- Plays: Right-handed (two-handed backhand)
- Prize money: $2,059,571

Singles
- Career record: 52-80
- Career titles: 0
- Highest ranking: No. 56 (December 9, 1985)

Grand Slam singles results
- Australian Open: 3R (1983, 1987)
- French Open: 1R (1986, 1988)
- Wimbledon: 3R (1986, 1987, 1988, 1989)
- US Open: 4R (1987)

Doubles
- Career record: 443-215
- Career titles: 34
- Highest ranking: No. 1 (October 14, 1985)

Grand Slam doubles results
- Australian Open: SF (1987)
- French Open: QF (1985, 1986, 1988)
- Wimbledon: W (1987, 1988)
- US Open: W (1985, 1993)

Other doubles tournaments
- Tour Finals: F (1987, 1991)
Medal record
Men's tennis
Representing the United States
Olympic Games
Gold medal – first place	1988 Seoul	Men's doubles

Kenneth Eliot Flach (May 24, 1963 – March 12, 2018) was an American doubles world No. 1 tennis player. He won four Grand Slam men's doubles titles (two Wimbledon and two US Open), and two mixed doubles titles (Wimbledon and the French Open). He also won the men's doubles gold medal at the 1988 Seoul Olympics, partnering Robert Seguso. Flach reached the world No. 1 doubles ranking in 1985.

== Early life ==
Kenneth Eliot Flach was born on May 24, 1963, in St. Louis and grew up in nearby Kirkwood, Missouri.

Before turning professional, Flach played tennis for Southern Illinois University-Edwardsville, where he won the NCAA Division II singles championships in 1981, 1982 and 1983, and teamed with Seguso to reach the 1983 Division I doubles final.

Flach married his first wife, model Sandra Freeman, in September 1986 and had four children together, Dylan, Madison, Noah and Hannah.

== Career ==
Flach played doubles on the US Davis Cup team from 1985 to 1991, compiling an 11–2 record. He was also a member of the US team which won the World Team Cup in 1985.

During his career, Flach won 36 doubles titles (34 men's doubles and 2 mixed doubles). His final career title was won in 1994 at Scottsdale, Arizona. At the US Open 1987 (second round) he won the longest fifth set tie-break to this day, 17-15 over Darren Cahill.

Following his retirement from the professional tour in 1996, Flach devoted himself to coaching. He guided Vanderbilt University to its first NCAA tournament berth in 1999. In 2003, he led the team to Vanderbilt's first NCAA championship finals appearance in any sport. He had also played in seniors events, and won the Wimbledon 35-and-over men's doubles title in 1999 and 2000.

In 2010, after moving to California, he married makeup entrepreneur Christina Friedman, and became the director of tennis at Novato's Rolling Hills Club.

== Death ==
In early March 2018, Flach became ill with bronchitis and died from sepsis after playing 36 holes of golf. He died shortly after falling ill with his sister, brothers and four children by his side.

Kaiser Permanente settled a malpractice case for nearly $2.9 million with the family of Ken Flach in 2021.

== Major finals ==
=== Grand Slam finals ===
==== Doubles: 6 (4 titles, 2 runner-ups) ====
Result	Year	Championship	Surface	Partner	Opponents	Score
Win	1985	US Open	Hard	(United States) Robert Seguso	(France) Henri Leconte (France) Yannick Noah	6–7^{(5–7)}, 7–6^{(7–1)}, 7–6^{(8–6)}, 6–0
Win	1987	Wimbledon	Grass	(United States) Robert Seguso	(Spain) Sergio Casal (Spain) Emilio Sánchez	3–6, 6–7^{(6–8)}, 7–6^{(7–3)}, 6–1, 6–4
Loss	1987	US Open	Hard	(United States) Robert Seguso	(Sweden) Stefan Edberg (Sweden) Anders Järryd	6–7^{(1–7)}, 2–6, 6–4, 7–5, 6–7^{(2–7)}
Win	1988	Wimbledon (2)	Grass	(United States) Robert Seguso	(Australia) John Fitzgerald (Sweden) Anders Järryd	6–4, 2–6, 6–4, 7–6^{(7–3)}
Loss	1989	US Open	Hard	(United States) Robert Seguso	(United States) John McEnroe (Australia) Mark Woodforde	4–6, 6–4, 3–6, 3–6
Win	1993	US Open (2)	Hard	(United States) Rick Leach	(Czech Republic) Martin Damm (Czech Republic) Karel Nováček	6–7^{(3–7)}, 6–4, 6–2

==== Mixed doubles: 2 (2 titles) ====
Result	Year	Championship	Surface	Partner	Opponents	Score
Win	1986	French Open	Clay	(United States) Kathy Jordan	(South Africa) Rosalyn Fairbank (Australia) Mark Edmondson	3–6, 7–6^{(7–3)}, 6–3
Win	1986	Wimbledon	Grass	(United States) Kathy Jordan	(United States) Martina Navratilova (Switzerland) Heinz Günthardt	6–3, 7–6^{(9–7)}

=== Olympic men's doubles final ===
Result	Year	Championship	Surface	Partner	Opponents	Score
Gold	1988	Seoul Olympics	Hard	(United States) Robert Seguso	(Spain) Sergio Casal (Spain) Emilio Sánchez	6–3, 6–4, 6–7^{(5–7)}, 6–7^{(1–7)}, 9–7

== Career finals ==
=== Doubles (34 wins, 24 losses) ===
Legend Grand Slam (4–2) Olympic Gold (1–0) Tennis Masters Cup (1–2) ATP Masters Series (2–1) ATP Championship Series (2–3) ATP Tour (22–16)	Finals by surface Hard (16–15) Clay (6–3) Grass (5–1) Carpet (7–5)

Result	No	Date	Tournament	Surface	Partner	Opponents	Score
Loss	1.	Dec 1983	Taipei, Taiwan	Carpet	(United States) Robert Seguso	(Australia) Wally Masur (Australia) Kim Warwick	6–7, 4–6
Win	1.	Jun 1984	Rome, Italy	Clay	(United States) Robert Seguso	(Australia) John Alexander (United States) Mike Leach	3–6, 6–3, 6–4
Loss	2.	Jul 1984	Newport, US	Grass	(United States) Robert Seguso	(Australia) David Graham (Australia) Laurie Warder	4–6, 6–7
Win	2.	Jul 1984	Boston, US	Clay	(United States) Robert Seguso	(United States) Gary Donnelly (Puerto Rico) Ernie Fernandez	6–4, 6–4
Win	3.	Aug 1984	Indianapolis, US	Clay	(United States) Robert Seguso	(Switzerland) Heinz Günthardt (Hungary) Balázs Taróczy	7–6, 7–5
Win	4.	Sep 1984	Los Angeles, US	Hard	(United States) Robert Seguso	(Poland) Wojtek Fibak (United States) Sandy Mayer	4–6, 6–4, 6–3
Win	5.	Oct 1984	Hong Kong	Hard	(United States) Robert Seguso	(Australia) Mark Edmondson (Australia) Paul McNamee	6–7, 6–3, 7–5
Win	6.	Nov 1984	Taipei, Taiwan	Carpet	(United States) Robert Seguso	(United States) Drew Gitlin (United States) Hank Pfister	6–1, 6–7, 6–2
Win	7.	Jan 1985	Masters Doubles WCT, London	Carpet (i)	(United States) Robert Seguso	(Switzerland) Heinz Günthardt (Hungary) Balázs Taróczy	6–3, 3–6, 6–3, 6–0
Loss	3.	Feb 1985	La Quinta, US	Hard	(United States) Robert Seguso	(Switzerland) Heinz Günthardt (Hungary) Balázs Taróczy	6–3, 6–7, 3–6
Win	8.	Apr 1985	Fort Myers, US	Hard	(United States) Robert Seguso	(United States) Sammy Giammalva Jr. (United States) David Pate	3–6, 6–3, 6–3
Loss	4.	Apr 1985	Chicago, US	Carpet (i)	(United States) Robert Seguso	(United States) Johan Kriek (France) Yannick Noah	6–3, 6–4, 5–7, 1–6, 4–6
Win	9.	May 1985	Forest Hills, US	Clay	(United States) Robert Seguso	(Brazil) Givaldo Barbosa (Brazil) Ivan Kley	7–5, 6–2
Loss	5.	May 1985	Rome, Italy	Clay	(United States) Robert Seguso	(Sweden) Anders Järryd (Sweden) Mats Wilander	6–4, 3–6, 2–6
Win	10.	Jun 1985	Queen's Club, UK	Grass	(United States) Robert Seguso	(Australia) Pat Cash (Australia) John Fitzgerald	3–6, 6–3, 16–14
Win	11.	Jul 1985	Indianapolis, US	Clay	(United States) Robert Seguso	(Czechoslovakia) Pavel Složil (Australia) Kim Warwick	6–4, 6–4
Loss	6.	Aug 1985	Stratton Mountain, US	Hard	(United States) Robert Seguso	(United States) Scott Davis (United States) David Pate	6–3, 6–7, 6–7
Win	12.	Aug 1985	Montreal, Canada	Hard	(United States) Robert Seguso	(Sweden) Stefan Edberg (Sweden) Anders Järryd	5–7, 7–6, 6–3
Win	13.	Sep 1985	US Open, New York	Hard	(United States) Robert Seguso	(France) Henri Leconte (France) Yannick Noah	6–7, 7–6, 7–6, 6–0
Win	14.	Oct 1985	Tokyo Indoor, Japan	Carpet (i)	(United States) Robert Seguso	(United States) Scott Davis (United States) David Pate	4–6, 6–3, 7–6
Win	15.	Feb 1986	Memphis, US	Carpet (i)	(United States) Robert Seguso	(France) Guy Forget (Sweden) Anders Järryd	6–4, 4–6, 7–6
Win	16.	Mar 1986	Chicago, US	Carpet (i)	(United States) Robert Seguso	(South Africa) Eddie Edwards (Paraguay) Francisco González	6–0, 7–5
Win	17.	Oct 1986	Tokyo Outdoor, Japan	Carpet	(United States) Matt Anger	(United States) Jimmy Arias (United States) Greg Holmes	6–2, 6–3
Loss	7.	Mar 1987	Miami, US	Hard	(United States) Robert Seguso	(United States) Paul Annacone (South Africa) Christo van Rensburg	2–6, 4–6, 4–6
Loss	8.	Apr 1987	Seoul, South Korea	Hard	(United States) Jim Grabb	(United States) Eric Korita (United States) Mike Leach	7–6, 1–6, 5–7
Win	18.	Jul 1987	Wimbledon, London	Grass	(United States) Robert Seguso	(Spain) Sergio Casal (Spain) Emilio Sánchez	3–6, 6–7, 7–6, 6–1, 6–4
Loss	9.	Jul 1987	Livingston, US	Hard	(United States) Robert Seguso	(United States) Gary Donnelly (United States) Greg Holmes	6–7, 3–6
Win	19.	Aug 1987	Cincinnati, US	Hard	(United States) Robert Seguso	(United States) Steve Denton (Australia) John Fitzgerald	7–5, 6–3
Loss	10.	Sep 1987	US Open, New York	Hard	(United States) Robert Seguso	(Sweden) Stefan Edberg (Sweden) Anders Järryd	6–7, 2–6, 6–4, 7–5, 6–7
Loss	11.	Nov 1987	Wembley, UK	Carpet (i)	(United States) Robert Seguso	(Czechoslovakia) Miloslav Mečíř (Czechoslovakia) Tomáš Šmíd	5–7, 4–6
Loss	12.	Dec 1987	Masters Doubles, London	Carpet (i)	(United States) Robert Seguso	(Czechoslovakia) Miloslav Mečíř (Czechoslovakia) Tomáš Šmíd	4–6, 5–7, 7–6, 3–6
Loss	13.	Mar 1988	Miami, US	Hard	(United States) Robert Seguso	(Australia) John Fitzgerald (Sweden) Anders Järryd	6–7, 1–6, 5–7
Win	20.	Jun 1988	Queen's Club, UK	Grass	(United States) Robert Seguso	(South Africa) Pieter Aldrich (South Africa) Danie Visser	6–2, 7–6
Win	21.	Jul 1988	Wimbledon, London	Grass	(United States) Robert Seguso	(Australia) John Fitzgerald (Sweden) Anders Järryd	6–4, 2–6, 6–4, 7–6
Loss	14.	Aug 1988	Indianapolis, US	Hard	(United States) Robert Seguso	(United States) Rick Leach (United States) Jim Pugh	4–6, 3–6
Win	22.	Aug 1988	Toronto, Canada	Hard	(United States) Robert Seguso	(United Kingdom) Andrew Castle (United States) Tim Wilkison	7–6, 6–3
Win	23.	Sep 1988	Seoul, South Korea	Hard	(United States) Robert Seguso	(Spain) Sergio Casal (Spain) Emilio Sánchez	6–3, 6–4, 6–7, 6–7, 9–7
Win	24.	Nov 1988	Wembley, UK	Carpet (i)	(United States) Robert Seguso	(United States) Martin Davis (Australia) Brad Drewett	7–5, 6–2
Loss	15.	Nov 1988	Detroit, US	Carpet (i)	(United States) Robert Seguso	(United States) Rick Leach (United States) Jim Pugh	4–6, 1–6
Win	25.	Apr 1989	Tokyo Outdoor, Japan	Hard	(United States) Robert Seguso	(United States) Kevin Curren (United States) David Pate	7–6, 7–6
Win	26.	Aug 1989	Cincinnati, US	Hard	(United States) Robert Seguso	(South Africa) Pieter Aldrich (South Africa) Danie Visser	6–4, 6–4
Loss	16.	Sep 1989	US Open, New York	Hard	(United States) Robert Seguso	(United States) John McEnroe (Australia) Mark Woodforde	4–6, 6–4, 3–6, 3–6
Loss	17.	Oct 1989	Orlando, US	Hard	(United States) Robert Seguso	(United States) Scott Davis (United States) Tim Pawsat	5–7, 7–5, 4–6
Loss	18.	Mar 1991	Miami, US	Hard	(United States) Robert Seguso	(South Africa) Wayne Ferreira (South Africa) Piet Norval	7–5, 6–7, 2–6
Win	27.	May 1991	Tampa, US	Clay	(United States) Robert Seguso	(United States) David Pate (United States) Richey Reneberg	6–7, 6–4, 6–1
Loss	19.	Jul 1991	Washington, D.C., US	Hard	(United States) Robert Seguso	(United States) Scott Davis (United States) David Pate	4–6, 2–6
Win	28.	Aug 1991	Cincinnati, US	Hard	(United States) Robert Seguso	(Canada) Grant Connell (Canada) Glenn Michibata	6–7, 6–4, 7–5
Win	29.	Aug 1991	Indianapolis, US	Hard	(United States) Robert Seguso	(United States) Kent Kinnear (United States) Sven Salumaa	7–6, 6–4
Loss	20.	Nov 1991	Doubles Championships, Johannesburg	Hard (i)	(United States) Robert Seguso	(Australia) John Fitzgerald (Sweden) Anders Järryd	4–6, 4–6, 6–2, 4–6
Win	30.	Mar 1992	Miami, US	Hard	(United States) Todd Witsken	(United States) Kent Kinnear (United States) Sven Salumaa	6–4, 6–3
Loss	21.	Jul 1992	Washington, D.C., US	Hard	(United States) Todd Witsken	(United States) Bret Garnett (United States) Jared Palmer	2–6, 3–6
Win	31.	Apr 1993	Tokyo Outdoor, Japan	Hard	(United States) Rick Leach	(Canada) Glenn Michibata (United States) David Pate	2–6, 6–3, 6–4
Win	32.	Jun 1993	Manchester, UK	Grass	(United States) Rick Leach	(South Africa) Stefan Kruger (Canada) Glenn Michibata	6–4, 6–1
Loss	22.	Aug 1993	Indianapolis, US	Hard	(United States) Rick Leach	(United States) Scott Davis (United States) Todd Martin	4–6, 4–6
Win	33.	Sep 1993	US Open, New York	Hard	(United States) Rick Leach	(Czech Republic) Martin Damm (Czech Republic) Karel Nováček	6–7, 6–4, 6–2
Win	34.	Feb 1994	Scottsdale, US	Hard	(Sweden) Jan Apell	(United States) Alex O'Brien (Australia) Sandon Stolle	6–0, 6–4
Loss	23.	May 1994	Coral Springs, US	Clay	(France) Stephane Simian	(South Africa) Lan Bale (New Zealand) Brett Steven	3–6, 5–7
Loss	24.	May 1996	Pinehurst, US	Clay	(United States) David Wheaton	(Australia) Pat Cash (Australia) Pat Rafter	2–6, 3–6

== Doubles performance timeline ==
Key
W	F	SF	QF	#R	RR	Q#	DNQ	A	NH

(W) winner; (F) finalist; (SF) semifinalist; (QF) quarterfinalist; (#R) rounds 4, 3, 2, 1; (RR) round-robin stage; (Q#) qualification round; (DNQ) did not qualify; (A) absent; (NH) not held; (SR) strike rate (events won / competed); (W–L) win–loss record.

Tournament	1983	1984	1985	1986	1987	1988	1989	1990	1991	1992	1993	1994	1995	1996	Career SR	Career win–loss
Grand Slam tournaments
Australian Open	3R	2R	A	NH	SF	A	A	A	A	A	A	QF	A	1R	0 / 5	8–5
French Open	A	1R	QF	QF	A	QF	A	2R	2R	2R	2R	1R	1R	1R	0 / 11	13–11
Wimbledon	A	3R	1R	QF	W	W	SF	QF	3R	3R	2R	2R	1R	1R	2 / 13	30–11
U.S. Open	1R	2R	W	A	F	SF	F	3R	SF	2R	W	1R	QF	1R	2 / 13	37–10
Grand Slam SR	0 / 2	0 / 4	1 / 3	0 / 2	1 / 3	1 / 3	0 / 2	0 / 3	0 / 3	0 / 3	1 / 3	0 / 4	0 / 3	0 / 4	4 / 42	N/A
Annual win–loss	2–2	3–4	9–2	6–2	14–2	13–2	9–2	6–2	7–3	4–3	8–2	4–4	3–3	0–4	N/A	88–37
ATP Masters Series
Indian Wells	These Tournaments Were Not Masters Series Events Before 1990							2R	2R	2R	QF	2R	A	1R	0 / 6	4–6
Miami	These Tournaments Were Not Masters Series Events Before 1990							2R	F	W	2R	3R	A	2R	1 / 6	12–5
Monte Carlo	These Tournaments Were Not Masters Series Events Before 1990							A	A	A	A	A	A	A	0 / 0	0–0
Rome	These Tournaments Were Not Masters Series Events Before 1990							A	A	A	A	A	A	A	0 / 0	0–0
Hamburg	These Tournaments Were Not Masters Series Events Before 1990							A	A	A	A	A	A	A	0 / 0	0–0
Canada	These Tournaments Were Not Masters Series Events Before 1990							1R	SF	2R	A	A	A	1R	0 / 4	3–4
Cincinnati	These Tournaments Were Not Masters Series Events Before 1990							2R	W	QF	2R	2R	A	A	1 / 5	10–4
Stuttgart (Stockholm)	These Tournaments Were Not Masters Series Events Before 1990							A	2R	A	2R	A	A	A	0 / 2	0–2
Paris	These Tournaments Were Not Masters Series Events Before 1990							A	SF	2R	2R	A	A	A	0 / 3	3–3
Masters Series SR	N/A							0 / 4	1 / 6	1 / 5	0 / 5	0 / 3	0 / 0	0 / 3	2 / 26	N/A
Annual win–loss	N/A							2–4	16–5	8–4	3–5	2–3	0–0	1–3	N/A	32–24
Year-end ranking	103	11	2	19	5	2	11	76	5	60	23	90	121	141	N/A	
