= 1996 Qatar Open – Singles =

Singles
- 1996 Qatar Open

Final
- Champion: (Czech Republic) Petr Korda
- Runner-up: (Morocco) Younes El Aynaoui
- Score: 7–6^{(7–5)}, 2–6, 7–6^{(7–5)}

Details
- Draw: 32
- Seeds: 8

Events
Singles	Doubles
← 1995 ·	ATP Qatar Open	· 1997 →

Stefan Edberg was the defending champion but lost in the first round to Boris Becker.

Petr Korda won in the final 7–6^{(7–5)}, 2–6, 7–6^{(7–5)} against Younes El Aynaoui.

== Seeds ==
1. (Austria) Thomas Muster (semifinals)
2. (Germany) Boris Becker (second round)
3. (Sweden) Thomas Enqvist (second round)
4. (Germany) Michael Stich (second round)
5. (Sweden) Magnus Larsson (quarterfinals)
6. (Netherlands) Paul Haarhuis (first round)
7. (Austria) Gilbert Schaller (first round)
8. (Netherlands) Jan Siemerink (first round)

== Draw ==
=== Key ===
- Q = Qualifier
- WC = Wild card
- LL = Lucky loser
- Alt = Alternate
- ITF = ITF entry
- PR = Protected ranking
- SR = Special ranking
- SE = Special exempt
- JE = Junior exempt
- JR = Junior Accelerator Programme entrant
- CO = College Accelerator Programme entrant
- NG = Next Gen Accelerator Program entrant
- w/o = Walkover
- r = Retired
- d = Defaulted

=== Finals ===
Semifinals
1	(Austria) Thomas Muster	4	4
WC	(Morocco) Younes El Aynaoui	6	6
(Czech Republic) Petr Korda	6^{4}	6	6
(Germany) David Prinosil	7^{7}	1	2

Final
WC	(Morocco) Younes El Aynaoui	6^{5}	6	6^{5}
(Czech Republic) Petr Korda	7^{7}	2	7^{7}

=== Top half ===
First round
1	(Austria) T Muster	6	7^{8}
(Spain) J Sánchez	2	6^{6}
(Netherlands) S Schalken	2	4
(Italy) A Gaudenzi	6	6
(Denmark) F Fetterlein	1	2
Q	(Sweden) N Kulti	6	6
(Romania) A Voinea	6	6
8	(Netherlands) J Siemerink	2	3
3	(Sweden) T Enqvist	6	6
Q	(Morocco) H Arazi	2	4
WC	(Morocco) Y El Aynaoui	6	6
(Spain) T Carbonell	4	4
(Germany) M-K Goellner	3	4
(France) G Raoux	6	6
(Russia) A Volkov	7	7^{7}
WC/6	(Netherlands) P Haarhuis	5	6^{1}

Second round
1	(Austria) T Muster	6	6
(Italy) A Gaudenzi	3	3
Q	(Sweden) N Kulti	6^{5}	4
(Romania) A Voinea	7^{7}	6
3	(Sweden) T Enqvist	6	3	4
WC	(Morocco) Y El Aynaoui	3	6	6
(France) G Raoux	6	4	6
(Russia) A Volkov	3	6	3

Quarterfinals
1	(Austria) T Muster	6	6
(Romania) A Voinea	2	2
WC	(Morocco) Y El Aynaoui	6	6
(France) G Raoux	2	3

Semifinals
1	(Austria) T Muster	4	4
WC	(Morocco) Y El Aynaoui	6	6

=== Bottom half ===
First round
5	(Sweden) M Larsson	6	6
WC	(Qatar) S Khalfan	0	1
(Czech Republic) B Ulihrach	6^{4}	3
(United States) J Tarango	7^{7}	6
(Czech Republic) P Korda	6	6
(Belgium) F Dewulf	3	2
(Norway) C Ruud	6	2	5
4	(Germany) M Stich	3	6	7
7	(Austria) G Schaller	0	2
(Germany) D Prinosil	6	6
(Morocco) K Alami	6	2	7
Q	(Russia) A Olhovskiy	2	6	5
(Sweden) J Apell	3	4
Q	(Venezuela) N Pereira	6	6
(Sweden) S Edberg	2	5
2	(Germany) B Becker	6	7

Second round
3	(Sweden) M Larsson	6	6^{5}	6
(United States) J Tarango	4	7^{7}	3
(Czech Republic) P Korda	6	6
4	(Germany) M Stich	3	4
(Germany) D Prinosil	6	6
(Morocco) K Alami	3	4
Q	(Venezuela) N Pereira	7^{7}	6^{4}	7^{7}
2	(Germany) B Becker	6^{4}	7^{7}	6^{5}

Quarterfinals
3	(Sweden) M Larsson	4	5
(Czech Republic) P Korda	6	7
(Germany) D Prinosil	6^{5}	6	6
Q	(Venezuela) N Pereira	7^{7}	2	1

Semifinals
(Czech Republic) P Korda	6^{4}	6	6
(Germany) D Prinosil	7^{7}	1	2
