= Aaron Krickstein =

American tennis player (born 1967)

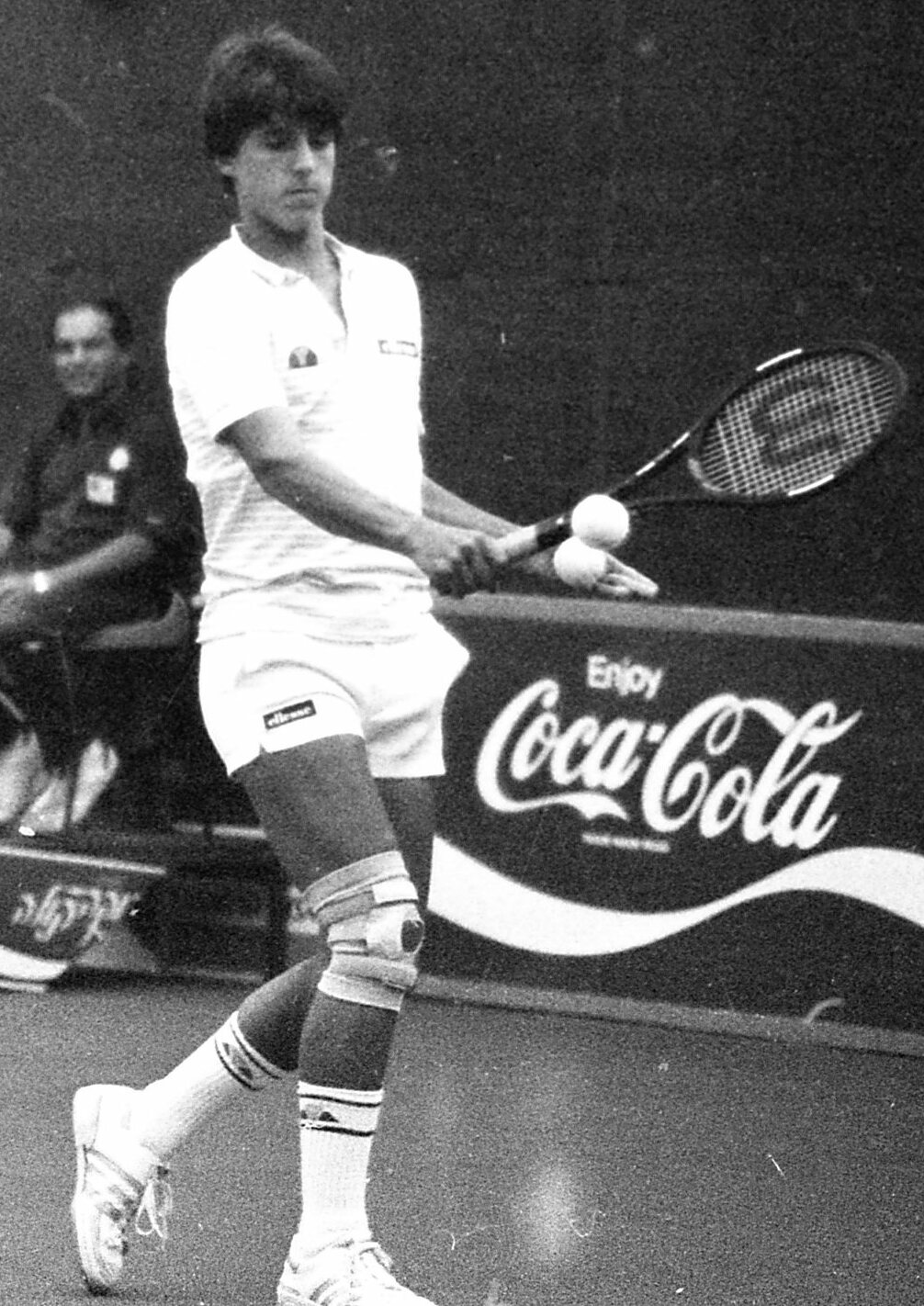
- Country (sports): United States
- Born: August 2, 1967 (age 59) Ann Arbor, Michigan, U.S.
- Height: 6 ft 0 in (1.83 m)
- Turned pro: 1983
- Retired: 1996
- Plays: Right-handed (two-handed backhand)
- Prize money: US$ 3,709,772

Singles
- Career record: 395–256 (60.7%)
- Career titles: 9
- Highest ranking: No. 6 (February 26, 1990)

Grand Slam singles results
- Australian Open: SF (1995)
- French Open: 4R (1985, 1994)
- Wimbledon: 4R (1989, 1995)
- US Open: SF (1989)

Other tournaments
- Tour Finals: RR (1989)
- Grand Slam Cup: QF (1990)

Doubles
- Career record: 10–19
- Career titles: 0
- Highest ranking: No. 196 (February 25, 1985)

Grand Slam doubles results
- French Open: 1R (1987)

Grand Slam mixed doubles results
- French Open: 1R (1983)

Team competitions
- Davis Cup: W (1990)
- Last updated on: August 01, 2026.

Aaron Krickstein (born August 2, 1967), nicknamed "Marathon Man", is an American former professional tennis player who competed on the ATP Tour from 1983 to 1996. He currently competes on the Outback Champions Series Over-30 tour.

Krickstein reached his career high ATP ranking of World No. 6 on February 26, 1990. He achieved this ranking on the back of wins in Sydney and Los Angeles, as well as his best ever results at Wimbledon and the US Open. He is perhaps best known for his five-set, marathon loss to Jimmy Connors at the 1991 US Open, which ESPN called "an instant classic".

== Personal life ==
Krickstein was born in Ann Arbor, Michigan, the son of Evelyn, a housewife, and Herb Krickstein, a pathologist. His sister, Kathy, won the Big Ten tennis championship in 1978. He is the uncle of LPGA golfer Morgan Pressel, Kathy's daughter.

Krickstein is Jewish and in the early 1990s was one of three highly ranked Jewish-American tennis players, along with Jay Berger and Brad Gilbert. In 2025 Krickstein was inducted into the National Jewish Sports Hall of Fame.

Krickstein has been the director of tennis at St. Andrews Country Club in Boca Raton, Florida, since 2002.

== Career ==
=== Junior ===
Krickstein started playing tennis when he was six. He became an active competitor on the high school tennis scene during his teens, and still holds the Michigan record for most consecutive match wins at this level (56). He played for University Liggett School.

Krickstein won the American National Under 16 championship in 1982. While still only 16, he was the US National Junior Tennis Association Champion, Clay Champion, and USTA National Champion in the 18s in 1983. He won five consecutive junior championships.

=== Professional ===
Krickstein set an ATP record for being the youngest player to win a singles title on the ATP Tour (at age 16, 2 months after his 16th birthday), in Tel Aviv. Krickstein set a record for being the youngest player to ever break the top 10 (at age 17). As of October 2026, both records still stand.

In 1984, he won the U.S. Pro Tennis Championship, becoming its youngest winner, and a clay court tournament in Boston. In 1989 he won the Tokyo Indoor Tennis Tournament and a hard court tournament in Sydney, Australia. In 1991, 1992, and 1993 he won the South African Open.

Krickstein had an injury-plagued career, which included stress fractures in his feet, problems with his knees and wrists in 1985 and 1986, and injuries suffered when he was hurt in a car accident in 1987.

His best finishes in a Grand Slam event were at the 1989 US Open, and at the 1995 Australian Open, where he reached the semi-finals.

Krickstein is perhaps best remembered for his famous five-set match against Jimmy Connors on Labor Day at the 1991 US Open. Krickstein had led the match 2–1 in sets and was ahead 5–2 in the fifth set, before losing the match in a tiebreaker. The match lasted four hours and 41 minutes. According to ESPN, "The match was an instant classic." Before retractable roofs were constructed for use at the US Open, this match was the default television filler during tournament rain delays; because of this, it is probably the most viewed tennis match of all time. For about 24 years after the match, Krickstein and Connors only spoke a few words to each other. But in 2014, Krickstein called Connors to invite him to play a "reunion match" for members at the Florida country club where Krickstein was (and still is) the tennis director. They played in February 2015 and Krickstein won a pro set 8–5.

He had a record of 10 career wins from 0–2 set deficits. His nickname "Marathon Man" was a reference to his ability to make a comeback when behind in a match. Krickstein won 28 of his 37 career matches that went into a fifth set.

Krickstein defeated a number of top players, including Ivan Lendl (world #1) in 1990, Michael Stich (world #2 and #4) in 1994 and 1991, Stefan Edberg (world #3) in 1988 at the US Open, Boris Becker (world #3) in 1992, Mats Wilander (world #4) in 1984, Jimmy Arias (world #5) in 1984, and Sergi Bruguera (world #5) in 1994. He won against Pete Sampras and Andre Agassi.

=== Davis Cup ===
Krickstein was a member of the United States Davis Cup team from 1985 to 1987, and also was a member of the 1990 squad. He compiled a 6–4 record in singles play during Davis Cup ties. The highlight of Krickstein's Davis Cup career came in 1990 when he scored two, hard-fought victories in a World Group Quarterfinal tie against Czechoslovakia, leading his team to a 4–1 win.

== ATP career finals ==
=== Singles: 19 (9 titles / 10 runner-ups) ===
Legend Grand Slam Tournaments (0–0) ATP World Tour Finals (0–0) ATP Masters 1000 Series (0–2) ATP 500 Series (0–1) ATP 250 Series (9–7)	Finals by surface Hard (6–6) Clay (2–3) Grass (0–0) Carpet (1–1)	Finals by setting Outdoors (8–9) Indoors (1–1)

Result	W–L	Date	Tournament	Tier	Surface	Opponent	Score
Win	1–0	Oct 1983	Tel Aviv, Israel	Grand Prix	Hard	(Germany) Christoph Zipf	7–6, 6–3
Loss	1–1	May 1984	Rome, Italy	Grand Prix	Clay	(Ecuador) Andrés Gómez	6–2, 1–6, 2–6, 2–6
Win	2–1	Jul 1984	Boston, United States	Grand Prix	Clay	(Argentina) José Luis Clerc	7–6^{(7–2)}, 3–6, 6–4
Loss	2–2	Jul 1984	Washington, United States	Grand Prix	Clay	(Ecuador) Andrés Gómez	2–6, 2–6
Win	3–2	Sep 1984	Tel Aviv (2), Israel	Grand Prix	Hard	(Israel) Shahar Perkiss	6–4, 6–1
Win	4–2	Sep 1984	Geneva, Switzerland	Grand Prix	Clay	(Sweden) Henrik Sundström	6–7, 6–1, 6–4
Loss	4–3	Nov 1985	Hong Kong, Hong Kong	Grand Prix	Hard	(Ecuador) Andrés Gómez	3–6, 3–6, 6–3, 4–6
Loss	4–4	Oct 1986	Tel Aviv, Israel	Grand Prix	Hard	(United States) Brad Gilbert	5–7, 2–6
Loss	4–5	Oct 1988	Tel Aviv, Israel	Grand Prix	Hard	(United States) Brad Gilbert	6–4, 6–7^{(5–7)}, 2–6
Loss	4–6	Nov 1988	Detroit, United States	Grand Prix	Carpet	(United States) John McEnroe	5–7, 2–6
Win	5–6	Jan 1989	Sydney, Australia	Grand Prix	Hard	(Soviet Union) Andrei Cherkasov	6–4, 6–2
Win	6–6	Sep 1989	Los Angeles, United States	Grand Prix	Hard	(United States) Michael Chang	2–6, 6–4, 6–2
Win	7–6	Oct 1989	Tokyo, Japan	Grand Prix	Carpet	(Germany) Carl-Uwe Steeb	6–2, 6–2
Loss	7–7	Apr 1990	Tokyo, Japan	Championship Series	Hard	(Sweden) Stefan Edberg	4–6, 5–7
Loss	7–8	Sep 1990	Brisbane, Australia	World Series	Hard	(United States) Brad Gilbert	3–6, 1–6
Loss	7–9	Sep 1991	Brisbane, Australia	World Series	Hard	(Italy) Gianluca Pozzi	3–6, 6–7^{(4–7)}
Win	8–9	Mar 1992	Johannesburg, South Africa	World Series	Hard	(Russia) Alexander Volkov	6–4, 6–4
Loss	8–10	Apr 1992	Monte Carlo, Monaco	Masters Series	Clay	(Austria) Thomas Muster	3–6, 1–6, 3–6
Win	9–10	Mar 1993	Johannesburg (2), South Africa	World Series	Hard	(South Africa) Grant Stafford	6–3, 7–6^{(9–7)}

== Performance timeline ==
Key
W	F	SF	QF	#R	RR	Q#	DNQ	A	NH

(W) winner; (F) finalist; (SF) semifinalist; (QF) quarterfinalist; (#R) rounds 4, 3, 2, 1; (RR) round-robin stage; (Q#) qualification round; (DNQ) did not qualify; (A) absent; (NH) not held; (SR) strike rate (events won / competed); (W–L) win–loss record.

=== Singles ===
Tournament	1983	1984	1985	1986	1987	1988	1989	1990	1991	1992	1993	1994	1995	1996	SR	W–L	Win %
Grand Slam tournaments
Australian Open	A	A	A	NH	A	A	4R	4R	4R	4R	A	3R	SF	1R	0 / 7	19–7	73%
French Open	A	2R	4R	2R	3R	1R	2R	3R	2R	3R	2R	4R	1R	A	0 / 12	17–12	59%
Wimbledon	A	A	1R	A	A	A	4R	A	2R	A	3R	3R	4R	A	0 / 6	11–6	65%
US Open	4R	3R	A	4R	A	QF	SF	QF	4R	A	2R	1R	2R	A	0 / 10	26–10	72%
Win–loss	3–1	3–2	3–2	4–2	2–1	4–2	12–4	9–3	8–4	5–2	4–3	7–4	9–4	0–1	0 / 35	73–35	68%
Year-end Championships
WCT Finals	DNQ		QF	Did not qualify				Not Held							0 / 1	1–1	50%
ATP Finals	Did not qualify						RR	Did not qualify							0 / 1	1–2	33%
Grand Slam Cup	Did not qualify							QF	1R	Did not qualify			1R	DNQ	0 / 3	1–3	25%
ATP Masters Series
Indian Wells	A	A	A	A	1R	2R	1R	QF	A	1R	A	SF	1R	A	0 / 7	7–7	50%
Miami	A	A	3R	3R	3R	QF	QF	2R	2R	2R	2R	4R	3R	1R	0 / 12	18–12	60%
Monte Carlo	A	1R	SF	3R	3R	2R	A	2R	A	F	2R	A	1R	A	0 / 9	12–9	57%
Hamburg	A	A	A	A	A	A	2R	3R	2R	A	A	1R	A	A	0 / 4	2–4	33%
Rome	1R	F	1R	3R	3R	2R	2R	3R	2R	1R	A	1R	A	A	0 / 11	14–11	56%
Canada	A	A	A	2R	A	A	A	A	A	QF	3R	2R	2R	A	0 / 5	7–5	58%
Cincinnati	A	1R	A	A	A	SF	3R	3R	2R	A	3R	2R	1R	A	0 / 8	11–8	58%
Paris	A	A	A	A	A	QF	SF	3R	A	A	Q2	1R	1R	A	0 / 5	6–5	55%
Win–loss	0–1	5–3	5–3	7–4	5–4	12–6	10–6	7–7	3–4	7–5	6–4	8–7	2–6	0–1	0 / 61	77–61	56%

== Records ==
- These records were attained in the Open Era of tennis.

Championship	Years	Record accomplished	Player tied
1983	Youngest player to end a year in the top 100 (16y 4 m; #94)	Stands alone	
1983	Youngest player to win a singles title (16y 2 m)	Stands alone	

== See also ==
- List of select Jewish tennis players
