= Little Caesars Championship Tennis Tournament =

Defunct men's tennis tournament held in Detroit

The Little Caesars Championship Tennis Tournament is a defunct men's tennis tournament that was played on the Grand Prix tennis circuit for one year in 1988. The event was held in Detroit, Michigan and was played on indoor carpet courts. John McEnroe won the singles event while Rick Leach and Jim Pugh teamed-up to win the doubles event.

== Finals ==
=== Singles ===
| Year | Champion | Runner-up | Score |
|---|---|---|---|
| 1988 | (United States) John McEnroe | (United States) Aaron Krickstein | 7–5, 6–2 |

=== Doubles ===
| Year | Champion | Runner-up | Score |
|---|---|---|---|
| 1988 | (United States) Rick Leach (United States) Jim Pugh | (United States) Ken Flach (United States) Robert Seguso | 6–4, 6–1 |
