= 1987 Nabisco Masters – Singles =

Singles
- 1987 Nabisco Masters

Final
- Champion: (Czechoslovakia) Ivan Lendl
- Runner-up: (Sweden) Mats Wilander
- Score: 6–2, 6–2, 6–3

Details
- Draw: 8

Events
Singles	Doubles
← 1986 ·	ATP Finals	· 1988 →

Two-time defending champion Ivan Lendl successfully defended his title, defeating Mats Wilander in the final, 6–2, 6–2, 6–3 to win the singles title at the 1987 Nabisco Masters.

In this year, the semifinal pairings were decided by a racket spin. This resulted in the two first placed players of each group playing each other again; in the case of Stefan Edberg and Wilander, for the second time in 24 hours (Edberg won the round robin match, but Wilander won the semifinal the following day).

== Draw ==
Key

- Q = Qualifier
- WC = Wild card
- LL = Lucky loser
- Alt = Alternate
- ITF = ITF entry
- PR = Protected ranking
- SR = Special ranking
- SE = Special exempt
- JE = Junior exempt
- JR = Junior Accelerator Programme entrant
- CO = College Accelerator Programme entrant
- NG = Next Gen Accelerator Program entrant
- w/o = Walkover
- r = Retired
- d = Defaulted

=== Finals ===
Semifinals
1	(Czechoslovakia) Ivan Lendl	6	6
8	(United States) Brad Gilbert	2	4
2	(Sweden) Stefan Edberg	2	6	3
3	(Sweden) Mats Wilander	6	4	6

Final
1	(Czechoslovakia) Ivan Lendl	6	6	6
3	(Sweden) Mats Wilander	2	2	3

== Round robin ==
=== Group A ===
		(Czechoslovakia) Lendl	(United States) Gilbert	(United States) Connors	(West Germany) Becker	RR; W–L	Set; W–L	Game; W–L	Standings
1	(Czechoslovakia) Ivan Lendl		6–2, 6–2	4–3, r	6–4, 6–7, 6–3	3–0	4–1	34–21	1
8	(United States) Brad Gilbert	2–6, 2–6		6–4, 7–6	4–6, 6–4, 6–4	2–1	4–3	33–36	2
4	(United States) Jimmy Connors	3–4, r	4–6, 6–7		5–7, 6–2, 3–6	0–3	1–4	27–32	4
5	(West Germany) Boris Becker	4–6, 7–6, 3–6	6–4, 4–6, 4–6	7–5, 2–6, 6–3		1–2	4–5	43–48	3

Standings are determined by: 1. number of wins; 2. number of matches; 3. in two-players-ties, head-to-head records; 4. in three-players-ties, percentage of sets won, or of games won; 5. steering-committee decision.

=== Group B ===
		(Sweden) Edberg	(Australia) Cash	(Czechoslovakia) Mečíř	(Sweden) Wilander	RR; W–L	Set; W–L	Game; W–L	Standings
2	(Sweden) Stefan Edberg		6–4, 4–6, 6–1	6–3, 6–3	6–2, 7–6	3–0	6–1	41–25	1
7	(Australia) Pat Cash	4–6, 6–4, 1–6		7–5, 6–4	6–7, 3–6	1–2	3–4	33–38	3
6	(Czechoslovakia) Miloslav Mečíř	3–6, 3–6	5–7, 4–6		4–6, 1–6	0–3	0–6	20–37	4
3	(Sweden) Mats Wilander	2–6, 6–7	7–6, 6–3	6–4, 6–1		2–1	4–2	33–27	2

Standings are determined by: 1. number of wins; 2. number of matches; 3. in two-players-ties, head-to-head records; 4. in three-players-ties, percentage of sets won, or of games won; 5. steering-committee decision.

== See also ==
- ATP World Tour Finals appearances
