= 1988 Nabisco Masters – Singles =

Singles
- 1988 Nabisco Masters

Final
- Champion: (West Germany) Boris Becker
- Runner-up: (Czechoslovakia) Ivan Lendl
- Score: 5–7, 7–6^{(7–5)}, 3–6, 6–2, 7–6^{(7–5)}

Details
- Draw: 8

Events
Singles	Doubles
← 1987 ·	ATP Finals	· 1989 →

Boris Becker defeated the three-time defending champion Ivan Lendl in the final, 5–7, 7–6^{(7–5)}, 3–6, 6–2, 7–6^{(7–5)} to win the singles title at the 1988 Nabisco Masters.

== Draw ==
Key

- Q = Qualifier
- WC = Wild card
- LL = Lucky loser
- Alt = Alternate
- ITF = ITF entry
- PR = Protected ranking
- SR = Special ranking
- SE = Special exempt
- JE = Junior exempt
- JR = Junior Accelerator Programme entrant
- CO = College Accelerator Programme entrant
- NG = Next Gen Accelerator Program entrant
- w/o = Walkover
- r = Retired
- d = Defaulted

=== Finals ===
Semifinals
6	(Switzerland) Jakob Hlasek	6	6
4	(West Germany) Boris Becker	7	7
5	(Sweden) Stefan Edberg	3	6
2	(Czechoslovakia) Ivan Lendl	6	7

Final
4	(West Germany) Boris Becker	5	7	3	6	7
2	(Czechoslovakia) Ivan Lendl	7	6^{5}	6	2	6^{5}

=== Group A ===
		(Switzerland) Hlasek	(Czechoslovakia) Lendl	(United States) Mayotte	(United States) Agassi	RR; W–L	Set; W–L	Game; W–L	Standings
6	(Switzerland) Jakob Hlasek		4–6, 6–3, 7–5	7–5, 6–3	6–3, 6–2	3–0	6–1	42–27	1
2	(Czechoslovakia) Ivan Lendl	6–4, 3–6, 5–7		6–2, 3–6, 6–3	1–6, 7–6, 6–3	2–1	5–4	43–43	2
8	(United States) Tim Mayotte	5–7, 3–6	2–6, 6–3, 3–6		2–6, 4–6	0–3	1–6	25–40	4
3	(United States) Andre Agassi	3–6, 2–6	6–1, 6–7, 3–6	6–2, 6–4		1–2	3–4	36–32	3

Standings are determined by: 1. number of wins; 2. number of matches; 3. in two-players-ties, head-to-head records; 4. in three-players-ties, percentage of sets won, or of games won; 5. steering-committee decision.

=== Group B ===
		(Sweden) Edberg	(West Germany) Becker	(Sweden) Wilander	(France) Leconte	RR; W–L	Set; W–L	Game; W–L	Standings
5	(Sweden) Stefan Edberg		7–6, 3–6, 6–4	6–2, 6–2	4–6, 2–6	2–1	4–3	34–32	1
4	(West Germany) Boris Becker	6–7, 6–3, 4–6		7–6, 6–7, 6–1	6–0, 1–0, r	2–1	4–3	42–30	2
1	(Sweden) Mats Wilander	2–6, 2–6	6–7, 7–6, 1–6		6–2, 6–4	1–2	3–4	30–35	3
7	(France) Henri Leconte	6–4, 6–2	0–6, 0–1, r	2–6, 4–6		1–2	2–3	18–25	4

Standings are determined by: 1. number of wins; 2. number of matches; 3. in two-players-ties, head-to-head records; 4. in three-players-ties, percentage of sets won, or of games won; 5. steering-committee decision.

== See also ==
- ATP World Tour Finals appearances
