= 1986 Nabisco Masters – Doubles =

Doubles
- 1986 Nabisco Masters

Final
- Champion: (Sweden) Stefan Edberg (Sweden) Anders Järryd
- Runner-up: (France) Guy Forget (France) Yannick Noah
- Score: 6–3, 7–6, 6–3

Events
| Singles | Doubles |
| ← 1985 · | Nabisco Masters | · 1987 → |

Defending champions Stefan Edberg and Anders Järryd successfully defended their title, defeating Guy Forget and Yannick Noah in the final, 6–3, 7–6, 6–3 to win the doubles tennis title at the 1986 Masters Grand Prix.

== Draw ==
Key

- Q = Qualifier
- WC = Wild card
- LL = Lucky loser
- Alt = Alternate
- ITF = ITF entry
- PR = Protected ranking
- SR = Special ranking
- SE = Special exempt
- JE = Junior exempt
- JR = Junior Accelerator Programme entrant
- CO = College Accelerator Programme entrant
- NG = Next Gen Accelerator Program entrant
- w/o = Walkover
- r = Retired
- d = Defaulted

=== Finals ===
Semifinals
(Sweden) Stefan Edberg (Sweden) Anders Järryd | 7 | 3 | 7 | 6
(United States) Mike De Palmer (United States) Gary Donnelly | 6 | 6 | 6 | 4
(Australia) John Fitzgerald (Czechoslovakia) Tomáš Šmíd | 2 | 4 | 6
(France) Guy Forget (France) Yannick Noah | 6 | 6 | 7

Final
1 | (Sweden) Stefan Edberg (Sweden) Anders Järryd | 6 | 7 | 6
6 | (France) Guy Forget (France) Yannick Noah | 3 | 6 | 3

=== Red group ===
| | (Sweden) Edberg (Sweden) Järryd | (South Africa) Steyn (South Africa) Visser | (Chile) Gildemeister (Ecuador) Gómez | (Australia) Fitzgerald (Czechoslovakia) Šmid | RR; W–L | Set; W–L | Game; W–L | Standings |
| (Sweden) Stefan Edberg (Sweden) Anders Järryd | | 5–7, 6–3, 7–6, 6–2 | 6–7, 3–6, 6–3, 6–7 | 4–6, 6–4, 7–5, 6–3 | 2–1 | 7–5 | 68–59 | 1 |
| (South Africa) Christo Steyn (South Africa) Danie Visser | 7–5, 3–6, 6–7, 2–6 | | 6–3, 6–4, 6–3 | 6–7, 4–6, 6–4, 2–6 | 1–2 | 5–6 | 54–57 | 3 |
| (Chile) Hans Gildemeister (Ecuador) Andrés Gómez | 7–6, 6–3, 3–6, 7–6 | 3–6, 4–6, 3–6 | | 5–7, 6–4, 6–2, 3–6, 4–6 | 1–2 | 5–6 | 54–64 | 4 |
| (Australia) John Fitzgerald (Czechoslovakia) Tomáš Šmíd | 6–4, 4–6, 5–7, 3–6 | 7–6, 6–4, 4–6, 6–2 | 7–5, 4–6, 2–6, 6–3, 6–4 | | 2–1 | 7–6 | 66–65 | 2 |

Standings are determined by: 1. number of wins; 2. number of matches; 3. in two-players-ties, head-to-head records; 4. in three-players-ties, percentage of sets won, or of games won; 5. steering-committee decision.

=== Blue group ===
| | (France) Forget (France) Noah | (United States) De Palmer (United States) Donnelly | (Spain) Casal (Spain) Sánchez | (Sweden) Nyström (Sweden) Wilander | RR; W–L | Set; W–L | Game; W–L | Standings |
| (France) Guy Forget (France) Yannick Noah | | 6–7, 6–4, 3–6 7–6, 7–5 | 6–2, 6–2 7–6 | 2–6, 7–5, 6–2, 7–5 | 3–0 | 9–3 | 70–56 | 1 |
| (United States) Mike De Palmer (United States) Gary Donnelly | 7–6, 4–6, 6–3, 6–7, 5–7 | | 3–6, 6–1, 3–6, 7–6, 6–4 | 4–6, 7–5, 6–1, 6–4 | 2–1 | 8–6 | 76–68 | 2 |
| (Spain) Sergio Casal (Spain) Emilio Sánchez | 2–6, 2–6 6–7 | 6–3, 1–6, 6–3, 6–7, 4–6 | | 7–6, 7–6, 6–1 | 1–2 | 5–6 | 53–57 | 3 |
| (Sweden) Joakim Nyström (Sweden) Mats Wilander | 6–2, 5–7, 2–6, 5–7 | 6–4, 5–7, 1–6, 4–6 | 6–7, 6–7, 1–6 | | 0–3 | 2–9 | 47–65 | 4 |

Standings are determined by: 1. number of wins; 2. number of matches; 3. in two-players-ties, head-to-head records; 4. in three-players-ties, percentage of sets won, or of games won; 5. steering-committee decision.
