= 1996 Qatar Open =

- Date: 1–7 January 1996
- Edition: 4th
- Category: World Series
- Draw: 32S / 16D
- Prize money: $600,000
- Surface: Hard / outdoor
- Location: Doha, Qatar

Champions

Singles
- (Czech Republic) Petr Korda

Doubles
- (The Bahamas) Mark Knowles / (Canada) Daniel Nestor
- ATP Qatar Open

The 1996 Qatar Open, known as the 1995 Qatar Mobil Open for sponsorship reasons, was a tennis tournament played on outdoor hard courts at the Khalifa International Tennis Complex in Doha in Qatar and was part of the World Series of the 1996 ATP Tour. It was the fourth edition of the tournament and was held from 1 January through 7 January 1996. Unseeded Petr Korda won the singles title.

== Finals ==
=== Singles ===
(Czech Republic) Petr Korda defeated (Morocco) Younes El Aynaoui 7–6^{(7–5)}, 2–6, 7–6^{(7–5)}

=== Doubles ===
(The Bahamas) Mark Knowles / (Canada) Daniel Nestor defeated (Netherlands) Jacco Eltingh / (Netherlands) Paul Haarhuis 7–6, 6–3

- It was Knowles' 1st title of the year and the 5th of his career. It was Nestor's 1st title of the year and the 3rd of his career.
