= 1986 Nabisco Masters – Singles =

Singles
- 1986 Nabisco Masters

Final
- Champion: (Czechoslovakia) Ivan Lendl
- Runner-up: (West Germany) Boris Becker
- Score: 6–4, 6–4, 6–4

Details
- Draw: 8

Events
Singles	Doubles
← 1985 ·	ATP Finals	· 1987 →

Defending champion Ivan Lendl defeated Boris Becker in the final, 6–4, 6–4, 6–4 to win the singles tennis title at the 1986 Nabisco Masters. He did not drop a set en route to the title.

== Draw ==
Key

- Q = Qualifier
- WC = Wild card
- LL = Lucky loser
- Alt = Alternate
- ITF = ITF entry
- PR = Protected ranking
- SR = Special ranking
- SE = Special exempt
- JE = Junior exempt
- JR = Junior Accelerator Programme entrant
- CO = College Accelerator Programme entrant
- NG = Next Gen Accelerator Program entrant
- w/o = Walkover
- r = Retired
- d = Defaulted

=== Finals ===
Semifinals
1	(Czechoslovakia) Ivan Lendl	6	6
3	(Sweden) Mats Wilander	4	2
2	(West Germany) Boris Becker	6	6
4	(Sweden) Stefan Edberg	4	4

Final
1	(Czechoslovakia) Ivan Lendl	6	6	6
2	(West Germany) Boris Becker	4	4	4

=== Fred Perry group ===
		(Czechoslovakia) Lendl	(France) Noah	(Ecuador) Gómez	(Sweden) Edberg	RR; W–L	Set; W–L	Game; W–L	Standings
1	(Czechoslovakia) Ivan Lendl		6–4, 6–4	6–3, 7–5	6–3, 6–4	3–0	6–0	37–23	1
5	(France) Yannick Noah	4–6, 4–6		6–7, 6–7	6–4, 3–6, 6–7	0–3	1–6	35–43	4
8	(Ecuador) Andrés Gómez	3–6, 5–7	7–6, 7–6		2–6, 3–6	1–2	2–4	27–37	3
4	(Sweden) Stefan Edberg	3–6, 4–6	4–6, 6–3, 7–6	6–2, 6–3		2–1	4–3	36–32	2

Standings are determined by: 1. number of wins; 2. number of matches; 3. in two-players-ties, head-to-head records; 4. in three-players-ties, percentage of sets won, or of games won; 5. steering-committee decision.

=== Don Budge group ===
		(West Germany) Becker	(Sweden) Nyström	(France) Leconte	(Sweden) Wilander	RR; W–L	Set; W–L	Game; W–L	Standings
2	(West Germany) Boris Becker		6–1, 6–3	0–6, 6–1, 6–1	6–3, 3–6, 6–3	3–0	6–2	39–24	1
7	(Sweden) Joakim Nyström	1–6, 3–6		6–4, 6–4	7–6, 3–6, 3–6	1–2	4–3	29–38	3
6	(France) Henri Leconte	6–0, 1–6, 1–6	4–6, 4–6		1–6, 5–7	0–3	1–6	22–37	4
3	(Sweden) Mats Wilander	3–6, 6–3, 3–6	6–7, 6–3, 6–3	6–1, 7–5		2–1	5–2	43–34	2

Standings are determined by: 1. number of wins; 2. number of matches; 3. in two-players-ties, head-to-head records; 4. in three-players-ties, percentage of sets won, or of games won; 5. steering-committee decision.

== See also ==
- ATP World Tour Finals appearances
