= 1989 Nabisco Masters – Singles =

Singles
- 1989 Nabisco Masters

Final
- Champion: (Sweden) Stefan Edberg
- Runner-up: (West Germany) Boris Becker
- Score: 4–6, 7–6^{(8–6)}, 6–3, 6–1

Details
- Draw: 8

Events
Singles	Doubles
← 1988 ·	ATP Finals	· 1990 →

Stefan Edberg defeated the defending champion Boris Becker in the final, 4–6, 7–6^{(8–6)}, 6–3, 6–1 to win the singles title at the 1989 Nabisco Masters.

== Draw ==
Key

- Q = Qualifier
- WC = Wild card
- LL = Lucky loser
- Alt = Alternate
- ITF = ITF entry
- PR = Protected ranking
- SR = Special ranking
- SE = Special exempt
- JE = Junior exempt
- JR = Junior Accelerator Programme entrant
- CO = College Accelerator Programme entrant
- NG = Next Gen Accelerator Program entrant
- w/o = Walkover
- r = Retired
- d = Defaulted

=== Finals ===
Semifinals
1	(Czechoslovakia) Ivan Lendl	6	5
3	(Sweden) Stefan Edberg	7	7
2	(West Germany) Boris Becker	6	6
4	(United States) John McEnroe	4	4

Final
3	(Sweden) Stefan Edberg	4	7^{8}	6	6
2	(West Germany) Boris Becker	6	6^{6}	3	1

== Round robin ==
=== Rod Laver group ===
		(Czechoslovakia) Lendl	(United States) McEnroe	(United States) Krickstein	(United States) Chang	RR; W–L	Set; W–L	Game; W–L	Standings
1	(Czechoslovakia) Ivan Lendl		6–3, 6–3	6–1, 6–3	6–1, 6–3	3–0	6–0	36–14	1
4	(United States) John McEnroe	3–6, 3–6		5–7, 6–3, 6–2	6–2, 5–7, 6–4	2–1	4–4	40–37	2
8	(United States) Aaron Krickstein	1–6, 3–6	7–5, 3–6, 2–6		6–3, 7–6	1–2	3–4	29–38	3
5	(United States) Michael Chang	1–6, 3–6	2–6, 7–5, 4–6	3–6, 6–7		0–3	1–6	26–42	4

Standings are determined by: 1. number of wins; 2. number of matches; 3. in two-players-ties, head-to-head records; 4. in three-players-ties, percentage of sets won, or of games won; 5. steering-committee decision.

=== Ilie Năstase group ===
		(West Germany) Becker	(Sweden) Edberg	(United States) Gilbert	(United States) Agassi	RR; W–L	Set; W–L	Game; W–L	Standings
2	(West Germany) Boris Becker		6–1, 6–4	2–6, 6–3, 6–4	6–1, 6–3	3–0	6–1	38–22	1
3	(Sweden) Stefan Edberg	1–6, 4–6		6–1, 6–3	6–4, 6–2	2–1	4–2	29–22	2
6	(United States) Brad Gilbert	6–2, 3–6, 4–6	1–6, 3–6		3–6, 6–3, 6–3	1–2	3–5	32–38	3
7	(United States) Andre Agassi	1–6, 3–6	4–6, 2–6	6–3, 3–6, 3–6		0–3	1–6	22–39	4

Standings are determined by: 1. number of wins; 2. number of matches; 3. in two-players-ties, head-to-head records; 4. in three-players-ties, percentage of sets won, or of games won; 5. steering-committee decision.

== See also ==
- ATP World Tour Finals appearances
