= Stefan Edberg =

Swedish tennis player (born 1966)

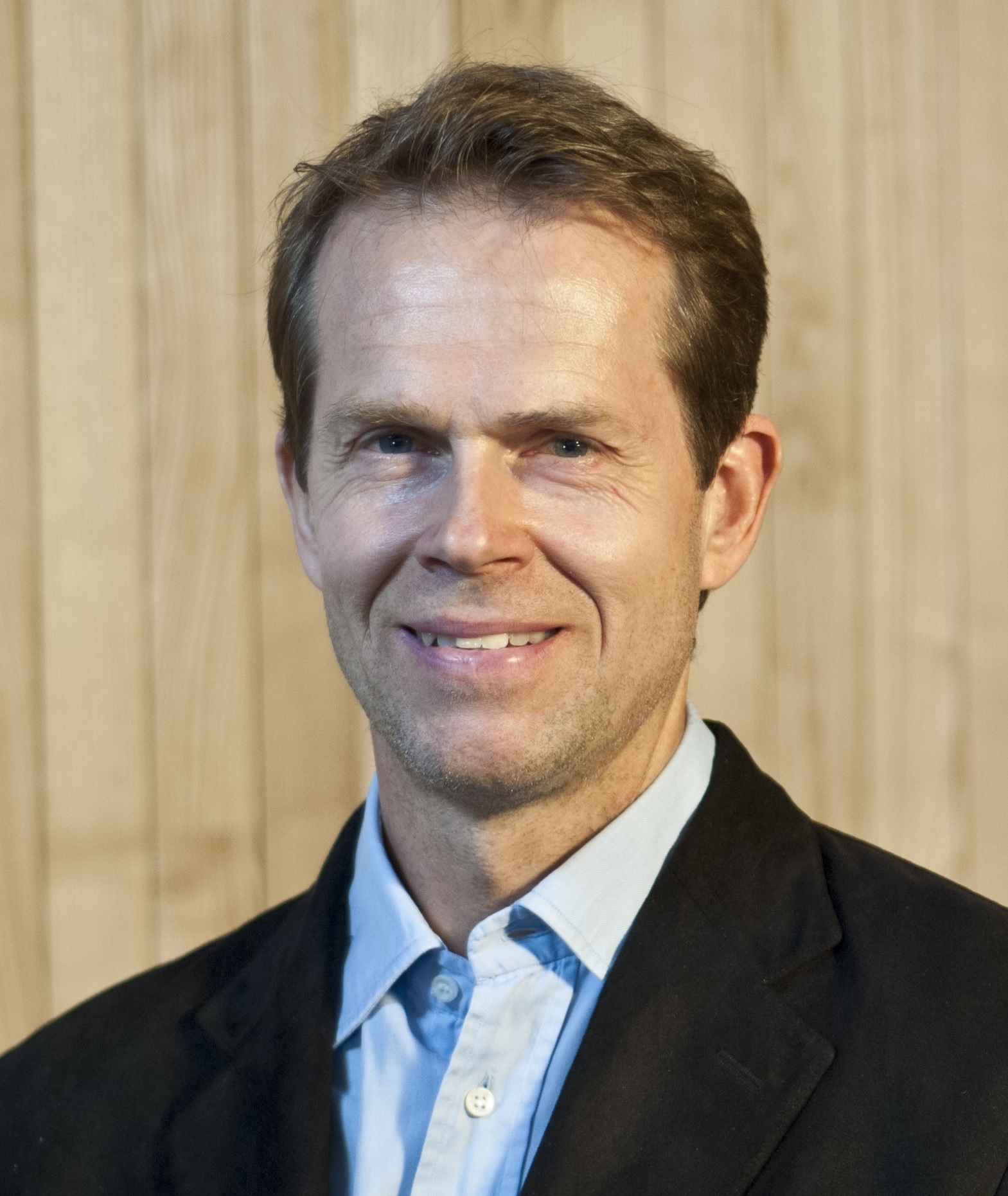
- Edberg in 2012
- Full name: Stefan Bengt Edberg
- Country (sports): Sweden
- Residence: London, England, UK
- Born: 19 January 1966 (age 60) Västervik, Sweden
- Height: 1.88 m (6 ft 2 in)
- Turned pro: 1983
- Retired: 1996
- Plays: Right-handed (one-handed backhand)
- Coach: Tony Pickard
- Prize money: US$20,613,441: 36th all-time leader in earnings
- Int. Tennis HoF: 2004 (member page)

Singles
- Career record: 801–270 (74.8%)
- Career titles: 41
- Highest ranking: No. 1 (13 August 1990)

Grand Slam singles results
- Australian Open: W (1985, 1987)
- French Open: F (1989)
- Wimbledon: W (1988, 1990)
- US Open: W (1991, 1992)

Other tournaments
- Tour Finals: W (1989)
- Grand Slam Cup: SF (1993)
- WCT Finals: F (1988)

Doubles
- Career record: 283–153 (64.9%)
- Career titles: 18
- Highest ranking: No. 1 (9 June 1986)

Grand Slam doubles results
- Australian Open: W (1987, 1996)
- French Open: F (1986)
- Wimbledon: SF (1987)
- US Open: W (1987)

Other doubles tournaments
- Tour Finals: W (1985, 1986)
- Olympic Games: SF (1988)

Team competitions
- Davis Cup: W (1984, 1985, 1987, 1994)

Coaching career (2014–2015)
- Roger Federer (2014–2015)

Coaching achievements
- Coachee singles titles total: 10
- List of notable tournaments (with champion) 3 x ATP World Tour Masters 1000 (Federer); Davis Cup (Federer)
Medal record
Men's tennis
Representing Sweden
Olympic Games
Bronze medal – third place	1988 Seoul	Singles
Bronze medal – third place	1988 Seoul	Doubles

Stefan Edberg (Swedish: [ˈstěːfan ˈêːdbærj]; born 19 January 1966) is a Swedish former professional tennis player. He was ranked as the world No. 1 in both men's singles and men's doubles by the Association of Tennis Professionals (ATP), one of two players in the Open Era to hold both positions (alongside John McEnroe). Edberg won 41 career singles titles and 18 doubles titles, including nine majors: six in singles and three in men's doubles. A major practitioner of the serve-and-volley style of tennis, Edberg also won the 1989 year-end championships, led Sweden to four Davis Cup titles, and won four Masters Series titles and four Championship Series titles. After retirement, Edberg coached Roger Federer from January 2014 to December 2015.

== Career ==
=== Juniors ===
Edberg first came to the tennis world's attention as a junior player. In the early 1980s, he won the European Junior Championships in the Under 14 and Under 16 categories, beating Jonas Svensson in both finals. He then won all four Grand Slam junior titles in 1983 to become the first (and only) player to achieve the "Junior Grand Slam" in the open era.

=== 1983–1985: Teenage Grand Slam champion ===
In 1983 Edberg won his first career doubles title in Basel. In 1984, Edberg won his first top-level singles title in Milan. Edberg also won the tennis tournament at the 1984 Summer Olympics when the sport was an exhibition event and partnered with fellow Swede Anders Järryd to reach the final of the US Open. Edberg also reached the French Open doubles final with Järryd in 1986 and consequently was world No. 1 in doubles in that year.

U.S. fans first took notice of Edberg's professional career when he won the U.S. Indoor in Memphis in February 1985, defeating Yannick Noah in the final. Edberg's first two Grand Slam singles titles came at the Australian Open. In December 1985, he defeated No. 1 Ivan Lendl in a five-set epic Australian Open semi-final match which was stopped multiple times by rain and played over two days. He then defeated Mats Wilander in straight sets to claim his first major title.

=== 1986–1989: Continuing success ===
Edberg reached the semi finals of the US Open in 1986 but lost in straight sets to Lendl. In January 1987, he defended his title by defeating local favourite Pat Cash in five sets to win the last Australian Open held on grass courts. Edberg reached the Wimbledon semi finals but lost in four sets to Lendl. He lost in four sets to Wilander in the US Open semi finals (Wilander made 9 unforced errors to Edberg's 44). Edberg also won the Australian Open and US Open men's doubles titles in 1987 (partnering fellow Swede Anders Järryd).

In 1988, Edberg lost in the Australian Open semi finals in five sets to Wilander (Edberg made 38 more unforced errors than his opponent). Edberg then reached the first of three consecutive finals at Wimbledon, where he met German Boris Becker in what became one of Wimbledon's greatest rivalries, with Edberg winning their first encounter in a four-set match spread over two days because of rain delays. However, Edberg lost his ranking as Sweden's number-one-player when Mats Wilander had his best year by winning the Australian, French and US Opens, becoming the world's number-one-ranked player.

Edberg reached the 1989 French Open final (beating Becker in the semis in five sets) but lost in five sets to 17-year-old Michael Chang, who became the youngest-ever male winner of a Grand Slam singles title. Ending up this was the only Grand Slam singles title that Edberg never won, denying him the completion of a career Grand Slam at the senior level, to match his junior Grand Slam. Edberg reached his second straight Wimbledon final aiming to defend his title, but lost the rematch to Becker in straight sets. Edberg gained revenge on Becker in the Masters final. After being a point away from a two set lead, Becker lost in four sets.

=== 1990–1992: No. 1 and final Grand Slam singles titles ===
In 1990, an abdominal muscle injury forced Edberg to retire from the Australian Open final while trailing Ivan Lendl 5–2 (including two breaks of serve) in the third set. Edberg reached his third consecutive Wimbledon final, which would be played against Becker for the third straight time, and it was their closest match. Becker led 3–1 in the fifth set but missed two easy forehand volleys and lost his serve, then at 4–4 Edberg hit a topspin lob to break Becker again and then held to win the match. Edberg took the world No. 1 ranking from Lendl on 13 August 1990 by winning the Super 9 tournament in Cincinnati. He held it for the rest of that year and for much of 1991 and 1992. Edberg spent a total of 72 weeks as World No. 1.

In the 1991 Australian Open semi finals, Edberg served for the match against Lendl leading 5-4 in the fourth set and had two match points but went on to lose in five sets. Edberg again reached the semi-finals of Wimbledon but lost to Michael Stich in four sets (losing three sets on tie breaks). Edberg's final two Grand Slam singles victories came at the US Open. In 1991 he defeated Jim Courier in the final in straight sets. Edberg was "a model of all-court brilliance and coolheadedness" and said afterwards it was the best match he had ever played. Courier gained his revenge by winning the 1992 Australian Open final in four sets. At 1992 US Open Edberg was a break down in the fifth set against Richard Krajicek in the fourth round but won. He then defeated Lendl in a five-set thriller spread over two days in the quarterfinals, having been a break down in the fifth set. He then defeated Michael Chang in the longest US Open match in history at the time, in the semi-finals, at 5 hours and 26 minutes, after being a break down in the fifth set. Edberg defeated Pete Sampras in the final in four sets (after Sampras had served for a two sets to one lead) to win his sixth and last Grand Slam singles title.

=== 1993–1996: Decline ===
In 1993, Edberg lost to Jim Courier in the Australian Open final in four sets. He was one of the few players who reached the finals of the Australian Open five times. The 1993 Australian Open final was Edberg's last Grand Slam singles final appearance. He reached the Wimbledon semi finals but lost in four sets to Courier (Courier "used his attacking baseline game to keep Edberg off balance").

Edberg reached the Australian Open semi finals in 1994 but lost in four sets to Todd Martin. "Martin continually left Edberg watching at the net as passing shots flew by". This was Edberg's last Grand Slam singles semi final. In 1996, Edberg won his third and final Grand Slam doubles title at the Australian Open with Petr Korda. He reached the final of Queens Club but lost the match to Boris Becker. He reached the quarterfinals of his last US Open after defeating Richard Krajicek and Tim Henman, but lost in the quarterfinals to Goran Ivanišević. He retired at the end of the year.

Edberg was most comfortable playing tennis on fast-playing surfaces. Of his six Grand Slam singles titles, four were won on grass courts at the Australian Open (1985 and 1987) and Wimbledon (1988 and 1990) and two were won on hardcourts at the US Open (1991 and 1992).

== Style of play ==
Edberg is noted as one of the finest serve-and-volley players of his era. Edberg did not possess a powerful dominating serve like Pete Sampras or Boris Becker, but his serve was still largely effective. Edberg often chose to use a less powerful serve, such as a kick or slice serve. The extra time from using a slower serve gave Edberg more time to get to the net, where he used his quick feet and athleticism to gain control of the point. Edberg's volleying skills were among the very best and he could easily redirect powerfully struck balls to the open court. He had sufficient groundstrokes, and his one-handed backhand was one of his marquee shots. Edberg played a two-handed backhand in his youth, but switched to a one-hander relatively late in his development, after winning the European Junior Championships. Edberg's backhand was extremely effective and considered amongst the best of his era.

== Equipment ==
Throughout his career, Edberg used Wilson racquets (Wilson Javelin 95 and Wilson Pro Staff 6.0 85) and Adidas clothing and shoes.

== Post-career competitive racquet sports ==
Edberg began playing competitive squash after his retirement from professional tennis and soon became an elite player in Sweden. When racketlon emerged as a growing sport in Scandinavia, Edberg's pro-level tennis ability and emerging squash prowess made him highly competitive, despite his relative inexperience in badminton and table tennis.

In September 2008, Stefan Edberg officially joined the "Black Rock Tour of Champions", a tour for professional tennis players who have retired from the ATP Tour. Edberg won his first tournament in Paris held on clay, winning matches against clay court specialists Thomas Muster in the opening round and Sergi Bruguera in the finals.

In January 2012, Edberg played a one-set exhibition against Jo-Wilfried Tsonga in Doha, Qatar, and lost 5–7.

== Coaching ==
Edberg signed a contract to become Roger Federer's coach at the end of 2013. Federer described Edberg's role as "more of a mentor than a coach"; nonetheless, his influence was widely regarded as pivotal in the Swiss champion's eventual resurgence, especially in bringing effective and more frequent serve-and-volley and net charging to his game. Their collaboration ended in December 2015.

== Distinctions and honors ==
- Edberg played on four Swedish Davis Cup winning teams in 1984, 1985, 1987 and 1994. He appeared in seven Davis Cup finals – a record for a Swedish player.
- Until 2016, the Australian Open logo was a silhouette of Stefan Edberg's unique service action. It was then changed to the current logo to make it more friendly for the digital medium.
- Since the Association of Tennis Professionals (ATP) computer rankings began, Edberg and John McEnroe are the only men to be ranked world No. 1 in both singles and doubles. Edberg is also the only player to achieve the "Junior Grand Slam" in the history of the game.
- Edberg and McEnroe are also the only players to earn both Player of the Year and Doubles Team of the Year. Edberg won Player of the Year in 1990 and 1991 and Doubles Team of the Year (with fellow Swede Anders Järryd) in 1986.
- Edberg and Boris Becker are the only male tennis players ever to receive the United Press International Athlete of the Year Award (with Edberg having received the award in 1990).
- Edberg was also a member of the Swedish teams that won the World Team Cup in 1988, 1991, and 1995.
- At the 1984 Olympic Games in Los Angeles, where tennis was a demonstration sport, Edberg won the men's singles gold medal. Four years later, at the 1988 Olympics in Seoul, tennis became a full medal sport and Edberg won bronze medals in both the men's singles and the men's doubles.
- During his career, Edberg won a total of 41 top-level singles titles (6 majors) and 18 doubles titles (3 majors) and appeared in a then record 54 consecutive Grand Slam tournaments (since then broken by Wayne Ferreira).
- He was ranked the world no. 1 in singles for a total of 72 weeks.
- Edberg was a then-record five time recipient of the ATP Sportsmanship Award (1988–90, 1992, and 1995). In recognition of this achievement, the ATP renamed the award the Stefan Edberg Sportsmanship Award in 1996.
- In 1996, Edberg won the Philippe Chatrier Award for his contribution to tennis both on and off the court.
- Edberg won the International Club's prestigious Jean Borotra Sportsmanship Award in 1998.
- In 2004, Edberg was inducted into the International Tennis Hall of Fame in Newport, Rhode Island, United States.
- Edberg won singles titles in 12 countries: Australia, France, Germany, Italy, Japan, Netherlands, Qatar, Spain, Sweden, Switzerland, the United Kingdom, and the United States.
- In 2008, Edberg was considered by Tennis Magazine to be the 14th greatest player, counting both male and female tennis players, of the Tennis Era. Counting men only, Edberg ranked eighth.
- Edberg was awarded the Svenska Dagbladet Gold Medal in 1990.
- Edberg is one of the few players who reached the final of all four Grand Slam tournaments, winning three of them. In the 1989 French Open final, Edberg led the match by two sets to one over Michael Chang and broke Chang's serve in the opening game of the fourth set, only for Chang to break right back. From 1–1 to 4–4 in the fourth set, every Chang service game was a struggle where Chang had to save 11 break points while Edberg held comfortably in his service games. At 5–4 to Chang in the fourth set, Chang broke Edberg's serve against the run of play to win the set. Edberg was also a break up early in the fifth set, but Chang won the fifth set 6–2 to take the title at the age of 17.
- Edberg won several Grand Slam matches after being down a break of serve in the fifth and deciding set. Notable examples include the 1985 Australian Open semi-final against Ivan Lendl, the 1988 Wimbledon semi-final against Miloslav Mečíř, the 1989 French Open semi-final against Boris Becker, and the 1990 Wimbledon final against Becker. In the 1992 US Open, Edberg won from a break down in the fifth set in three consecutive matches, against Richard Krajicek in the fourth round, Ivan Lendl in the quarter-final, and Michael Chang in the semi-final. In all of these tournaments, with the exception of the 1989 French Open, Edberg went on to win the tournament.

== Personal life ==
Edberg was born in Västervik, Sweden. He is married to Annette Hjort Olsen, whom he married in April 1992. They have two children, Emilie and Christopher. Olsen was previously in a relationship with Edberg's tennis rival Mats Wilander before her relationship with Edberg began in 1985.

Edberg is a supporter of English football team Leeds United and the Swedish ice hockey team Växjö Lakers.

== Career statistics ==
=== Grand Slam tournament timeline ===
Key
**W**	F	SF	QF	#R	RR	Q#	DNQ	A	NH

(W) winner; (F) finalist; (SF) semifinalist; (QF) quarterfinalist; (#R) rounds 4, 3, 2, 1; (RR) round-robin stage; (Q#) qualification round; (DNQ) did not qualify; (A) absent; (NH) not held; (SR) strike rate (events won / competed); (W–L) win–loss record.

Tournament	1983	1984	1985	1986	1987	1988	1989	1990	1991	1992	1993	1994	1995	1996	SR	W–L	Win %
**Grand Slam tournaments**
Australian Open	2R	QF	**W**	NH	**W**	SF	QF	F	SF	F	F	SF	4R	2R	2 / 13	56–10	84.85
French Open	A	2R	QF	2R	2R	4R	F	1R	QF	3R	QF	1R	2R	4R	0 / 13	30–13	69.77
Wimbledon	2R	2R	4R	3R	SF	**W**	F	**W**	SF	QF	SF	2R	2R	2R	2 / 14	49–12	80.33
US Open	1R	2R	4R	SF	SF	4R	4R	1R	**W**	**W**	2R	3R	3R	QF	2 / 14	43–12	78.18
Win–loss	1–3	6–4	16–3	8–3	17–3	18–3	19–3	13–3	21–3	19–3	16–4	8–4	7–4	9–4	6 / 54	178–47	79.11

=== Records ===
- These records were attained in Open Era of tennis.
- Records in **bold** indicate peer-less achievements.

**Championship**	**Years**	**Record accomplished**	**Player tied**
Japan Open	1987, 1989–1991	4 singles titles	**Stands alone**
No. 1 ranking	1986–1992	Achieved both in singles and doubles	John McEnroe
Fewest games match	1987	Triple bagel win (6–0, 6–0, 6–0)	Nikola Špear; Karel Nováček; Ivan Lendl; Sergi Bruguera
ATP Championship series	1991	4 titles won in a single season	Boris Becker; Juan Martín del Potro

== Place in history ==
Edberg is considered by many to be one of the greatest tennis players of his era. In his home country, together with Mats Wilander, he is commonly regarded as the best Swedish tennis player after Björn Borg.

== Professional awards ==
- ITF World Champion: 1991
- ATP Player of the Year: 1990, 1991

== See also ==
- Becker–Edberg rivalry
- Edberg–Lendl rivalry
- Tennis male players statistics
- World number 1 male tennis player rankings
- List of Swedish sportspeople

Sporting positions
Preceded by Ivan Lendl; Boris Becker; Boris Becker; Jim Courier; Jim Courier	World No. 1; 13 August 1990 – 27 January 1991; 18 February 1991 – 7 July 1991; 9 September 1991 – 9 February 1992; 23 March 1992 – 12 April 1992; 14 September 1992 – 4 October 1992	Succeeded by Boris Becker; Boris Becker; Jim Courier; Jim Courier; Jim Courier
Awards and achievements
Preceded by Nat. table tennis team	Svenska Dagbladet Gold Medal; 1990	Succeeded by Pernilla Wiberg
Preceded by Boris Becker	United Press International; Athlete of the Year; 1990	Succeeded by Sergey Bubka
Preceded by Boris Becker	ATP Player of the Year; 1990, 1991	Succeeded by Jim Courier
Preceded by Ivan Lendl	ITF World Champion; 1991	Succeeded by Jim Courier
Olympic Games
Preceded by Agneta Andersson	Flagbearer for Sweden; Barcelona 1992	Succeeded by Jan-Ove Waldner
