= 1994 Hawaii Open – Doubles =

Men's tennis tournament in Hawaii, US

Doubles
- 1994 Oahu Open

Final
- Champions: (Netherlands) Tom Nijssen (Czech Republic) Cyril Suk
- Runners-up: (United States) Alex O'Brien (United States) Jonathan Stark
- Score: 6–4, 6–4

Events
Singles	Doubles
Oahu Open

Tom Nijssen and Cyril Suk won in the final 6–4, 6–4, against Alex O'Brien and Jonathan Stark.

== Seeds ==
1. (Canada) Grant Connell / (United States) Patrick Galbraith (quarterfinals)
2. (United States) Patrick McEnroe / (United States) Richey Reneberg (quarterfinals)
3. (Netherlands) Tom Nijssen / (Czech Republic) Cyril Suk (champions)
4. (South Africa) Wayne Ferreira / (South Africa) Danie Visser (first round)

== Draw ==
=== Key ===
- Q = Qualifier
- WC = Wild card
- LL = Lucky loser
- Alt = Alternate
- SE = Special exempt
- PR = Protected ranking
- ITF = ITF entry
- JE = Junior exempt
- w/o = Walkover
- r = Retired
- d = Defaulted
- SR = Special ranking

=== Draw ===
First round
1	(Canada) G Connell (United States) P Galbraith	6	7
(United States) P Annacone (United States) G Van Emburgh	1	5
(United States) D Johnson (United States) J Sullivan	6	1
(Mexico) J Lozano (United States) J Pugh	7	6
3	(Netherlands) T Nijssen (Czech Republic) C Suk	7	6	7
(United States) M Briggs (United States) M Keil	6	7	5
WC	(United States) D Flach (United States) B Gilbert	5	3
(The Bahamas) M Knowles (United States) J Palmer	7	6
(United States) B Pearce (United States) D Randall	6	7
WC	(United States) CB Strode (United States) MS Strode	3	6
(United States) S DeVries (United States) K Kinnear	6	2	6
4	(South Africa) W Ferreira (South Africa) D Visser	3	6	3
(United States) A O'Brien (United States) J Stark	7	7
(United States) S Davis (United States) D Pate	6	6
(United States) J Grabb (West Germany) P Kühnen	4	5
2	(United States) P McEnroe (United States) R Reneberg	6	7

Quarterfinals
1	(Canada) G Connell (United States) P Galbraith	4	3
(Mexico) J Lozano (United States) J Pugh	6	6
3	(Netherlands) T Nijssen (Czech Republic) C Suk	6	6
(The Bahamas) M Knowles (United States) J Palmer	3	3
(United States) B Pearce (United States) D Randall	6	7
(United States) S DeVries (United States) K Kinnear	2	6
(United States) A O'Brien (United States) J Stark	4	7	6
2	(United States) P McEnroe (United States) R Reneberg	6	6	1

Semifinals
(Mexico) J Lozano (United States) J Pugh	7	4	6
3	(Netherlands) T Nijssen (Czech Republic) C Suk	6	6	7
(United States) B Pearce (United States) D Randall	2	4
(United States) A O'Brien (United States) J Stark	6	6

Final
3	(Netherlands) T Nijssen (Czech Republic) C Suk	6	6
(United States) A O'Brien (United States) J Stark	4	4
