= Stanford Championships =

Outback Champions Series tennis tournament

Defunct tennis tournament
- Founded: 2006; 19 years ago
- Abolished: 2008; 17 years ago
- Location: Memphis, Tennessee (2006); Dallas, Texas (2007-08)
- Surface: Hard / outdoor

The Stanford Championships was an event in the Outback Champions Series for senior tennis players. It began in 2006 in Memphis, Tennessee, but relocated to Dallas, Texas, in 2007. It is sponsored by the Stanford Financial Group.

== Finals ==
Year	Champion	Runner-up	Score
2008	(United States) Jim Courier	(Sweden) Thomas Enqvist	3–6, 6–4, 10–8 (TB)
2007	(South Africa) Wayne Ferreira	(United States) Jim Courier	2–6, 6–3, 11–9 (TB)
2006	(Sweden) Magnus Larsson	(South Africa) Wayne Ferreira	6–7, 6–4, 7–5 (TB)
