= 1994 Hawaii Open – Singles =

Singles
- 1994 Oahu Open

Final
- Champion: (South Africa) Wayne Ferreira
- Runner-up: (United States) Richey Reneberg
- Score: 6–4, 6–7^{(3–7)}, 6–1

Details
- Draw: 32 (4Q / 3WC )
- Seeds: 8

Events
Singles	Doubles
Oahu Open

Wayne Ferreira won in the final 6–4, 6–7^{(3–7)}, 6–1, against Richey Reneberg.

== Seeds ==
1. (South Africa) Wayne Ferreira (champion)
2. (United States) Richey Reneberg (final)
3. (Sweden) Jonas Svensson (first round)
4. (United States) Brad Gilbert (quarterfinals)
5. (United States) Jonathan Stark (semifinals)
6. (France) Fabrice Santoro (first round)
7. (Italy) Renzo Furlan (quarterfinals)
8. (United States) Patrick McEnroe (quarterfinals)

== Draw ==
=== Key ===
- Q = Qualifier
- WC = Wild card
- LL = Lucky loser
- Alt = Alternate
- SE = Special exempt
- PR = Protected ranking
- ITF = ITF entry
- JE = Junior exempt
- w/o = Walkover
- r = Retired
- d = Defaulted
- SR = Special ranking

=== Finals ===
Semifinals
1	(South Africa) Wayne Ferreira	4	6	6
5	(United States) Jonathan Stark	6	4	4
(United States) Robbie Weiss	3	2
2	(United States) Richey Reneberg	6	6

Final
1	(South Africa) Wayne Ferreira	6	6^{3}	6
2	(United States) Richey Reneberg	4	7^{7}	1

=== Top half ===
First round
1	(South Africa) W Ferreira	4	7^{7}	6
Q	(Germany) M Zoecke	6	6^{4}	1
WC	(United States) J Grabb	4	6	7^{7}
(Zimbabwe) K Ullyett	6	3	6^{4}
(Venezuela) M Ruah	3	4
(United States) J Palmer	6	6
(Australia) N Borwick	2	3
8	(United States) P McEnroe	6	6
4	(United States) B Gilbert	4	6	7
WC	(United States) B Pearce	6	4	5
(Sweden) L Jonsson	3	1
(Germany) P Kühnen	6	6
(Canada) C Pridham	4	4
Q	(Germany) A Finnberg	6	6
(United States) A O'Brien	6^{4}	2
5	(United States) J Stark	7^{7}	6

Second round
1	(South Africa) W Ferreira	6^{2}	6	7^{7}
WC	(United States) J Grabb	7^{7}	2	6^{4}
(United States) J Palmer	6	4	2
8	(United States) P McEnroe	4	6	6
4	(United States) B Gilbert	6	6
(Germany) P Kühnen	4	3
Q	(Germany) A Finnberg	4	4
5	(United States) J Stark	6	6

Quarterfinals
1	(South Africa) W Ferreira	6	6
8	(United States) P McEnroe	4	4
4	(United States) B Gilbert	6^{4}	6^{5}
5	(United States) J Stark	7^{7}	7^{7}

Semifinals
1	(South Africa) W Ferreira	4	6	6
5	(United States) J Stark	6	4	4

=== Bottom half ===
First round
6	(France) F Santoro	4	5
WC	(United States) J Arias	6	7
Q	(United States) M Joyce	6	6
(United Kingdom) C Wilkinson	1	3
(United States) T Ho	3	6^{4}
(France) J-P Fleurian	6	7^{7}
(United States) R Weiss	6	6
3	(Sweden) J Svensson	1	2
7	(Italy) R Furlan	6	6
(United States) S Bryan	4	2
(Ukraine) D Poliakov	4	4
(Italy) C Caratti	6	6
Q	(Czech Republic) C Suk	2	6^{5}
(United States) D Flach	6	7^{7}
(Italy) G Pozzi	2	2
2	(United States) R Reneberg	6	6

Second round
WC	(United States) J Arias	6	6
Q	(United States) M Joyce	1	2
(France) J-P Fleurian	6	3	6^{2}
(United States) R Weiss	2	6	7^{7}
7	(Italy) R Furlan	6	7^{7}
(Italy) C Caratti	3	6^{2}
(United States) D Flach	3	3
2	(United States) R Reneberg	6	6

Quarterfinals
WC	(United States) J Arias	0	6	3
(United States) R Weiss	6	2	6
7	(Italy) R Furlan	4	2
2	(United States) R Reneberg	6	6

Semifinals
(United States) R Weiss	3	2
2	(United States) R Reneberg	6	6
