= The Oliver Group Champions Cup =

The Oliver Group Champions Cup is an event in the Outback Champions Series for senior tennis players. It is held each year in Naples, Florida, and it was known as the Champions Cup Naples prior to 2007 when sponsorship for the event was picked up by The Oliver Group , a Florida-based real estate development firm.

== Finals results ==
=== 2008 ===
Todd Martin defeated John McEnroe 6-3, 6-1

=== 2007 ===
Wayne Ferreira defeated Aaron Krickstein 6-3, 6-3

=== 2006 ===
Jim Courier defeated Pat Cash 6-4, 7-6(8)
