= Senior Tour =

Senior Tour may refer to:

- PGA Tour Champions, a tour for American senior male golfers
- European Senior Tour, a tour for European senior male golfers
- Legends Tour, a tour for senior female golfers
- Outback Champions Series, a tour for senior male tennis players
