= 1991 Paris Open =

- Date: 28 October – 4 November
- Edition: 19th
- Category: ATP Championship Series, Single-Week
- Draw: 48S / 24D
- Prize money: $1,650,000
- Surface: Carpet / indoor
- Location: Paris, France
- Venue: Palais omnisports de Paris-Bercy

Champions

Singles
- (France) Guy Forget

Doubles
- (United States) John Fitzgerald / (Sweden) Anders Järryd
← 1990 ·	Paris Masters	· 1992 →

The 1991 Paris Open was a men's tennis tournament played on indoor carpet courts. It was the 19th edition of the Paris Masters, and was part of the ATP Super 9 of the 1991 ATP Tour. It took place at the Palais omnisports de Paris-Bercy in Paris, France, from 28 October through 4 November 1991.

The singles draw was headlined by ATP No. 1, Tokyo, Queen's, US Open titleist, Australian Open, Wimbledon semi-finalist Stefan Edberg, Australian Open, Stockholm winner, Wimbledon, Monte Carlo, Indianapolis runner-up Boris Becker and Indian Wells, Miami and French Open champion Jim Courier. Other top seeds were Cincinnati winner Guy Forget, Pete Sampras, Sergi Bruguera and Karel Nováček.

== Finals ==
=== Singles ===
(France) Guy Forget defeated (United States) Pete Sampras, 7–6^{(11–9)}, 4–6, 5–7, 6–4, 6–4

- It was Forget's 6th title of the year and his 9th overall. It was his 2nd Masters title of the year, and overall.

=== Doubles ===
(Australia) John Fitzgerald / (Sweden) Anders Järryd defeated (United States) Kelly Jones / (United States) Rick Leach, 3–6, 6–3, 6–2
