= 1997 Nokia Open =

- Date: September 29 – October 5
- Edition: 5th
- Category: World Series
- Draw: 32S / 16D
- Location: Beijing, China

Champions

Singles
- (United States) Jim Courier

Doubles
- (India) Mahesh Bhupathi / (India) Leander Paes
← 1996 ·	Nokia Open	· 1998 →

The 1997 Nokia Open was a men's tennis tournament played on indoor hard courts. It is the 5th edition of the China Open, and is part of the World Series of the 1997 ATP Tour. The event was held at the Beijing International Tennis Center in Beijing, China. The event took place from September 29 to October 5. First-seeded Jim Courier won the singles title.

== Finals ==
=== Singles ===
(United States) Jim Courier defeated (Sweden) Magnus Gustafsson, 7–6^{(12–10)}, 3–6, 6–3

=== Doubles ===
(India) Mahesh Bhupathi / (India) Leander Paes defeated (United States) Jim Courier / (United States) Alex O'Brien, 7–5, 7–6^{(9–7)}
