= 1992 RCA Championships =

- Date: August 17–23
- Edition: 5th
- Category: Championship Series
- Draw: 56S / 28D
- Prize money: $865,000
- Surface: Hard / outdoor
- Location: Indianapolis, IN, U.S.
- Venue: Indianapolis Tennis Center

Champions

Singles
- (United States) Pete Sampras

Doubles
- (United States) Jim Grabb / (United States) Richey Reneberg
- Indianapolis Tennis Championships

The 1992 RCA Championships was a men's tennis tournament played on outdoor hard courts at the Indianapolis Tennis Center in Indianapolis, Indiana in the United States that was part of the Championship Series of the 1992 ATP Tour. It was the fifth edition of the tournament and was held from August 17 through August 23, 1992. Second-seeded Pete Sampras won his second consecutive singles title at the event.

== Finals ==
=== Singles ===
(United States) Pete Sampras defeated (United States) Jim Courier 6–4, 6–4

- It was Sampras' 4th singles title of the year and the 12th of his career.

=== Doubles ===
(United States) Jim Grabb / (United States) Richey Reneberg defeated (Canada) Grant Connell / (United States) Glenn Michibata 7–6, 6–2

- It was Grabb's 5th doubles title of the year and the 12th of his career. It was Reneberg's 3rd doubles title of the year and the 6th of his career.
