= 1991 Paris Open – Doubles =

Doubles
- 1991 Paris Open

Final
- Champions: (Australia) John Fitzgerald; (Sweden) Anders Järryd
- Runners-up: (United States) Kelly Jones; (United States) Rick Leach
- Score: 3–6, 6–3, 6–2

Details
- Draw: 24
- Seeds: 8

Events
Singles	Doubles
← 1990 ·	Paris Open	· 1992 →

Scott Davis and David Pate were the defending champions, but lost in the second round this year.

John Fitzgerald and Anders Järryd won in the final 3–6, 6–3, 6–2, against Kelly Jones and Rick Leach.

== Seeds ==
All seeds receive a bye into the second round.

1. (Australia) John Fitzgerald / (Sweden) Anders Järryd (champions)
2. (United States) Scott Davis / (United States) David Pate (second round)
3. (Canada) Grant Connell / (Canada) Glenn Michibata (second round)
4. (Australia) Todd Woodbridge / (Australia) Mark Woodforde (quarterfinals)
5. (United States) Ken Flach / (United States) Robert Seguso (semifinals)
6. (United States) Patrick Galbraith / (United States) Todd Witsken (semifinals)
7. (United States) Luke Jensen / (Australia) Laurie Warder (quarterfinals)
8. (Switzerland) Jakob Hlasek / (United States) Patrick McEnroe (second round)

== Draw ==
=== Key ===
- Q = Qualifier
- WC = Wild card
- LL = Lucky loser
- Alt = Alternate
- SE = Special exempt
- PR = Protected ranking
- ITF = ITF entry
- JE = Junior exempt
- w/o = Walkover
- r = Retired
- d = Defaulted
- SR = Special ranking

=== Finals ===
Semifinals

Final

1
- (Australia) John Fitzgerald
- (Sweden) Anders Järryd
6
6

6
- (United States) Patrick Galbraith
- (United States) Todd Witsken
3
3

1
- (Australia) John Fitzgerald
- (Sweden) Anders Järryd
3
6
6

- (United States) Kelly Jones
- (United States) Rick Leach
6
3
2

5
- (United States) Ken Flach
- (United States) Robert Seguso
7
6
5

- (United States) Kelly Jones
- (United States) Rick Leach
5
7
7

=== Top half ===
First round

Second round

Quarterfinals

Semifinals

1
- (Australia) J Fitzgerald
- (Sweden) A Järryd
6
7

- (Belgium) L Pimek
- (Netherlands) J Siemerink
6
4
3

- (United States) B Pearce
- (Australia) J Stoltenberg
1
6

- (United States) B Pearce
- (Australia) J Stoltenberg
4
6
6

1
- (Australia) J Fitzgerald
- (Sweden) A Järryd
6
7

- (United Kingdom) N Broad
- (South Africa) D Visser
5
6
3

7
- (United States) L Jensen
- (Australia) L Warder
2
6

Q
- (United States) J Brown
- (United States) S Melville
7
4
6

Q
- (United States) J Brown
- (United States) S Melville
2
6

7
- (United States) L Jensen
- (Australia) L Warder
6
7

1
- (Australia) J Fitzgerald
- (Sweden) A Järryd
6
6

6
- (United States) P Galbraith
- (United States) T Witsken
3
3

4
- (Australia) T Woodbridge
- (Australia) M Woodforde
6
6

- (United States) S DeVries
- (Australia) D Macpherson
6
6
6

- (United States) S DeVries
- (Australia) D Macpherson
3
3

WC
- (France) A Boetsch
- (France) G Forget
7
3
4

4
- (Australia) T Woodbridge
- (Australia) M Woodforde
7
4
1

- (United States) K Kinnear
- (United States) S Salumaa
6
6

6
- (United States) P Galbraith
- (United States) T Witsken
6
6
6

- (United States) J Grabb
- (United States) R Reneberg
4
1

- (United States) K Kinnear
- (United States) S Salumaa
3
6
6

6
- (United States) P Galbraith
- (United States) T Witsken
6
3
7

=== Bottom half ===
First round

Second round

Quarterfinals

Semifinals

5
- (United States) K Flach
- (United States) R Seguso
7
6

- (South Africa) W Ferreira
- (South Africa) P Norval
6
3
4

- (Italy) O Camporese
- (Socialist Federal Republic of Yugoslavia) G Ivanišević
6
4

- (Italy) O Camporese
- (Socialist Federal Republic of Yugoslavia) G Ivanišević
3
6
6

5
- (United States) K Flach
- (United States) R Seguso
7
6

- (Australia) M Kratzmann
- (Australia) W Masur
5
6

WC
- (France) H Leconte
- (France) Y Noah
6
4

WC
- (France) H Leconte
- (France) Y Noah
7
7

WC
- (France) H Leconte
- (France) Y Noah
7
6

3
- (Canada) G Connell
- (Canada) G Michibata
6
4

5
- (United States) K Flach
- (United States) R Seguso
7
6
5

- (United States) K Jones
- (United States) R Leach
5
7
7

8
- (Switzerland) J Hlasek
- (United States) P McEnroe
6
4

- (United States) C Beckman
- (United States) D Wheaton
7
7

- (United States) C Beckman
- (United States) D Wheaton
7
6

- (Germany) U Riglewski
- (Germany) M Stich
6
5

- (United States) C Beckman
- (United States) D Wheaton
5
2

- (United States) K Jones
- (United States) R Leach
4
6
6

- (United States) K Jones
- (United States) R Leach
7
6

- (Netherlands) T Nijssen
- (Czechoslovakia) C Suk
6
4
3

- (United States) K Jones
- (United States) R Leach
4
6
6

2
- (United States) S Davis
- (United States) D Pate
6
0
2
