= 1992 RCA Championships – Doubles =

Doubles
- 1992 RCA Championships

Final
- Champions: (United States) Jim Grabb (United States) Richey Reneberg
- Runners-up: (Canada) Grant Connell (United States) Glenn Michibata
- Score: 7–6, 6–2

Details
- Draw: 28 (3WC/2Q)
- Seeds: 8

Events
Singles	Doubles
- Indianapolis Tennis Championships

Ken Flach and Robert Seguso were the defending champions, but Seguso did not compete this year. Flach teamed up with Todd Witsken and lost in the quarterfinals to John Fitzgerald and Anders Järryd.

Jim Grabb and Richey Reneberg won the title by defeating Grant Connell and Glenn Michibata 7–6, 6–2 in the final.

== Seeds ==
The top four seeds received a bye to the second round.

1. (Australia) John Fitzgerald / (Sweden) Anders Järryd (semifinals)
2. (United States) Jim Grabb / (United States) Richey Reneberg (champions)
3. (United States) Luke Jensen / (Australia) Laurie Warder (second round)
4. (United States) Patrick Galbraith / (South Africa) Danie Visser (quarterfinals)
5. (United States) Scott Davis / (United States) David Pate (second round)
6. (Spain) Sergio Casal / (Spain) Emilio Sánchez (second round)
7. (United States) Kent Kinnear / (United States) Sven Salumaa (first round)
8. (United States) Ken Flach / (United States) Todd Witsken (quarterfinals)

== Draw ==
Key

- Q = Qualifier
- WC = Wild card
- LL = Lucky loser
- Alt = Alternate
- ITF = ITF entry
- PR = Protected ranking
- SR = Special ranking
- SE = Special exempt
- JE = Junior exempt
- JR = Junior Accelerator Programme entrant
- CO = College Accelerator Programme entrant
- NG = Next Gen Accelerator Program entrant
- w/o = Walkover
- r = Retired
- d = Defaulted

=== Finals ===
Semifinals
1	(Australia) John Fitzgerald (Sweden) Anders Järryd	6	4	3
(Canada) Grant Connell (Canada) Glenn Michibata	4	6	6
(United States) Dave Randall (United States) Kenny Thorne	4	6
2	(United States) Jim Grabb (United States) Richey Reneberg	6	7

Final
(Canada) Grant Connell (Canada) Glenn Michibata	6	2
2	(United States) Jim Grabb (United States) Richey Reneberg	7	6

=== Top half ===
First round
(South Africa) R Deppe (South Africa) B Haygarth	6	6	3
(United States) J Connors (United Kingdom) J Lloyd	2	7	6
(United States) B Pearce (South Africa) B Talbot	6	3	7
(United States) K Curren (South Africa) G Muller	4	6	5
(Sweden) R Båthman (Sweden) R Bergh	3	6	3
8	(United States) K Flach (United States) T Witsken	6	4	6
(South Africa) P Aldrich (South Africa) JL de Jager	3	5
(United States) T Martin (United States) T Siegel	6	7
(Canada) G Connell (Canada) G Michibata	7	6
(Germany) B Becker (Germany) M Zoecke	6	4
(France) O Delaître (France) R Gilbert	3	1
5	(United States) S Davis (United States) D Pate	6	6

Second round
1	(Australia) J Fitzgerald (Sweden) A Järryd	6	6
(United States) J Connors (United Kingdom) J Lloyd	3	2
(United States) B Pearce (South Africa) B Talbot	7	3	3
8	(United States) K Flach (United States) T Witsken	6	6	6
4	(United States) P Galbraith (South Africa) D Visser	7	7
(United States) T Martin (United States) T Siegel	5	5
(Canada) G Connell (Canada) G Michibata	7	6
5	(United States) S Davis (United States) D Pate	6	3

Quarterfinals
1	(Australia) J Fitzgerald (Sweden) A Järryd	6	7	6
8	(United States) K Flach (United States) T Witsken	7	5	2
4	(United States) P Galbraith (South Africa) D Visser	3	7	4
(Canada) G Connell (Canada) G Michibata	6	6	6

Semifinals
1	(Australia) J Fitzgerald (Sweden) A Järryd	6	4	3
(Canada) G Connell (Canada) G Michibata	4	6	6

=== Bottom half ===
First round
6	(Spain) S Casal (Spain) E Sánchez	6	2	7
(United States) M Briggs (United States) T Kronemann	4	6	6
(Australia) N Borwick (Australia) S Youl	6	6	4
(South Africa) W Ferreira (South Africa) P Norval	7	2	6
(United States) D DiLucia (United States) B MacPhie	3	7	3
(United States) D Randall (United States) K Thorne	6	6	6
7	(United States) K Kinnear (United States) S Salumaa	6	4
Q	(United States) A Parker (United States) D Witt	7	6
(Spain) T Carbonell (Belgium) L Pimek	4	6	6
(South Africa) M Ondruska (Zimbabwe) K Ullyett	6	4	2
(United States) F Montana (United States) J Stark	7	6
(United Kingdom) N Broad (South Africa) S Kruger	6	4

Second round
6	(Spain) S Casal (Spain) E Sánchez	6	3	4
(South Africa) W Ferreira (South Africa) P Norval	2	6	6
(United States) D Randall (United States) K Thorne	7	7
3	(United States) L Jensen (Australia) L Warder	5	5
Q	(United States) A Parker (United States) D Witt	1	2
(Spain) T Carbonell (Belgium) L Pimek	6	6
(United States) F Montana (United States) J Stark	2	4
2	(United States) J Grabb (United States) R Reneberg	6	6

Quarterfinals
(South Africa) W Ferreira (South Africa) P Norval	6	2	6
(United States) D Randall (United States) K Thorne	4	6	7
(Spain) T Carbonell (Belgium) L Pimek	3	4
2	(United States) J Grabb (United States) R Reneberg	6	6

Semifinals
(United States) D Randall (United States) K Thorne	4	6
2	(United States) J Grabb (United States) R Reneberg	6	7
