= The Championship (disambiguation) =

The Championship commonly refers to the English Football League Championship, a division in British association football.

The Championship(s) may also refer to:

== Competitions ==
=== Football ===
- The EFL Championship, the second tier of English men’s football
- The Women's Championship, the second tier of English women’s football
- The Scottish Championship, the second tier of Scottish football
- The NIFL Championship, the second tier of Northern Irish football
- The Australian Championship, an Australian men's football competition

=== Rugby ===
- The RFL Championship the second tier of British rugby league
- The RFU Championship, the second tier of English rugby union
- The Welsh Championship, the second tier of Welsh rugby union
- The Elite 1 (rugby league) championship, the first tier of French rugby league
  - The Elite 2 (rugby league) championship, the second tier of that league
- The Rugby Championship, the Southern Hemisphere rugby union competition, formerly known as the Tri Nations Series
- The former Rugby Football League Championship First Division of English rugby league, replaced by British Super League in 1996

=== Tennis ===
- The Wimbledon Championships, the longest-established tennis tournament in the world
- The Championships at the Palisades, an event in the Outback Champions Series for senior tennis players

=== Other sports ===
- The Scottish Championship (golf), a 2020 golf tournament

== Other ==
- The Championship Course, the Oxford and Cambridge Boat Race Thames course
- The Championship (TV programme), a 2004–2009 British football highlights television program

== See also ==
- Championship
