= 1992 RCA Championships – Singles =

Singles
- 1992 RCA Championships

Final
- Champion: (United States) Pete Sampras
- Runner-up: (United States) Jim Courier
- Score: 6–4, 6–4

Details
- Draw: 56 (4WC/7Q)
- Seeds: 16

Events
Singles	Doubles
- Indianapolis Tennis Championships

Pete Sampras was the defending champion and successfully defended his title, by defeating Jim Courier 6–4, 6–4 in the final.

== Seeds ==
The top eight seeds received a bye to the second round.

1. (United States) Jim Courier (final)
2. (United States) Pete Sampras (champion)
3. (Germany) Boris Becker (semifinals)
4. (Spain) Carlos Costa (second round)
5. (South Africa) Wayne Ferreira (third round)
6. (Spain) Francisco Clavet (quarterfinals)
7. (Spain) Emilio Sánchez (second round)
8. (United States) Derrick Rostagno (second round)
9. (Spain) Javier Sánchez (second round)
10. (Argentina) Alberto Mancini (first round)
11. (United States) Jimmy Connors (quarterfinals)
12. (France) Olivier Delaître (third round)
13. (United States) David Wheaton (third round)
14. (Sweden) Christian Bergström (first round)
15. (Italy) Stefano Pescosolido (first round)
16. (Sweden) Magnus Gustafsson (second round)

== Draw ==
Key

- Q = Qualifier
- WC = Wild card
- LL = Lucky loser
- Alt = Alternate
- ITF = ITF entry
- PR = Protected ranking
- SR = Special ranking
- SE = Special exempt
- JE = Junior exempt
- JR = Junior Accelerator Programme entrant
- CO = College Accelerator Programme entrant
- NG = Next Gen Accelerator Program entrant
- w/o = Walkover
- r = Retired
- d = Defaulted

=== Finals ===
Quarterfinals
1	(United States) Jim Courier	6	6
(New Zealand) Brett Steven	2	3
(United States) Todd Martin	6	6
6	(Spain) Francisco Clavet	1	2
11	(United States) Jimmy Connors	4	3
3	(Germany) Boris Becker	6	6
WC	(Sweden) Thomas Enqvist	0	6^{6}
2	(United States) Pete Sampras	6	7^{8}

Semifinals
1	(United States) Jim Courier	7^{7}	7^{7}
(United States) Todd Martin	6^{5}	6^{4}
3	(Germany) Boris Becker	7^{7}	2	6^{3}
2	(United States) Pete Sampras	6^{3}	6	7^{7}

Final
1	(United States) Jim Courier	4	4
2	(United States) Pete Sampras	6	6

=== Top half ===
==== Section 1 ====
First round
(France) C Pioline	6	6
Q	(New Zealand) K Evernden	4	2
Q	(Sweden) D Engel	4	6	6
(Canada) C Pridham	6	3	4
WC	(United States) K Kinnear	4	6	1
16	(Sweden) M Gustafsson	6	4	6
9	(Spain) J Sánchez	4
(Mexico) L Lavalle	1^{r}
(Spain) G López	4	2
(Australia) S Stolle	6	6
(New Zealand) B Steven	4	6	4
(Australia) J Stoltenberg	6	0	2^{r}

Second round
1	(United States) J Courier	6	6
(France) C Pioline	4	2
Q	(Sweden) D Engel	6	4	6
16	(Sweden) M Gustafsson	2	6	1
9	(Spain) J Sánchez	6^{5}	7	4
(Australia) S Stolle	7^{7}	5	6
(New Zealand) B Steven	6	6
8	(United States) D Rostagno	3	3

Third round
1	(United States) J Courier	7^{7}	6
Q	(Sweden) D Engel	6^{2}	2
(Australia) S Stolle	0	1^{r}
(New Zealand) B Steven	6	1

Quarterfinals
1	(United States) J Courier	6	6
(New Zealand) B Steven	2	3

==== Section 2 ====
First round
WC	(United States) D Witt	6	3	1
Q	(South Africa) M Ondruska	1	6	6
Q	(Sweden) M Pernfors	3	6	6
(United States) R Reneberg	6	4	4
(United States) T Martin	6	6
14	(Sweden) C Bergström	0	3
12	(France) O Delaître	4	6	6
(Sweden) A Järryd	6	4	2
(United States) R Weiss	3	4
(United States) J Stark	6	6
(Australia) R Fromberg	7^{7}	6^{4}	0
(France) T Champion	6^{2}	7^{7}	6

Second round
4/WC	(Spain) C Costa	1	3
Q	(South Africa) M Ondruska	6	6
Q	(Sweden) M Pernfors	5	2
(United States) T Martin	7	6
12	(France) O Delaître	6	6
(United States) J Stark	4	4
(France) T Champion	4	1
6	(Spain) F Clavet	6	6

Third round
Q	(South Africa) M Ondruska	2	1
(United States) T Martin	6	6
12	(France) O Delaître	3	4
6	(Spain) F Clavet	6	6

Quarterfinals
(United States) T Martin	6	6
6	(Spain) F Clavet	1	2

=== Bottom half ===
==== Section 3 ====
First round
(Peru) P Arraya	5	6	3
(United States) K Curren	7	1	6
(Australia) S Youl	6	6
(France) G Raoux	2	0
WC	(United States) D DiLucia	1	2
11	(United States) J Connors	6	6
13	(United States) D Wheaton	2	6	6
(France) R Gilbert	6	2	4
(Spain) F Roig	7	6
(Australia) C Limberger	5	2
(Germany) M Zoecke	6	7^{8}
(Sweden) N Kulti	3	6^{6}

Second round
5	(South Africa) W Ferreira	6	6
(United States) K Curren	3	4
(Australia) S Youl	5	4
11	(United States) J Connors	7	6
13	(United States) D Wheaton	6	2	7
(Spain) F Roig	3	6	5
(Germany) M Zoecke	4	4
3	(Germany) B Becker	6	6

Third round
5	(South Africa) W Ferreira	3	2
11	(United States) J Connors	6	6
13	(United States) D Wheaton	6^{7}	3
3	(Germany) B Becker	7^{9}	6

Quarterfinals
11	(United States) J Connors	4	3
3	(Germany) B Becker	6	6

==== Section 4 ====
First round
(United States) J Grabb	3	3
Q	(United States) T Ho	6	6
(United States) F Montana	3	7	4
WC	(Sweden) T Enqvist	6	5	6
(Spain) T Carbonell	6	6
10	(Argentina) A Mancini	1	4
15	(Italy) S Pescosolido	5	3
(United States) T Witsken	7	6
(South Africa) G Muller	6	6
(Australia) J Fitzgerald	1	4
Q	(United States) T Mercer	6	1	1
Q	(France) S Sansoni	3	6	6

Second round
7	(Spain) E Sánchez	6^{4}	3
Q	(United States) T Ho	7^{7}	6
WC	(Sweden) T Enqvist	6	6
(Spain) T Carbonell	4	1
(United States) T Witsken	5
(South Africa) G Muller	3^{r}
Q	(France) S Sansoni	0	1
2	(United States) P Sampras	6	6

Third round
Q	(United States) T Ho	3	6^{4}
WC	(Sweden) T Enqvist	6	7^{7}
(United States) T Witsken	4	5
2	(United States) P Sampras	6	7

Quarterfinals
WC	(Sweden) T Enqvist	0	6^{6}
2	(United States) P Sampras	6	7^{8}
