= 1993 ATP Tour World Championships – Singles =

Singles
- 1993 ATP Tour World Championships

Final
- Champion: (Germany) Michael Stich
- Runner-up: (United States) Pete Sampras
- Score: 7–6^{(7–3)}, 2–6, 7–6^{(9–7)}, 6–2

Details
- Draw: 8

Events
Singles	Doubles
← 1992 ·	ATP Finals	· 1994 →

Michael Stich defeated Pete Sampras in the final, 7–6^{(7–3)}, 2–6, 7–6^{(9–7)}, 6–2 to win the singles tennis title at the 1993 ATP Tour World Championships.

Boris Becker was the reigning champion, but failed to qualify that year.

== Seeds ==
1. (United States) Pete Sampras (final)
2. (United States) Jim Courier (round robin)
3. (Germany) Michael Stich (champion)
4. (Spain) Sergi Bruguera (round robin)
5. (Sweden) Stefan Edberg (round robin)
6. (Ukraine) Andrei Medvedev (semifinals)
7. (United States) Michael Chang (round robin)
8. (Croatia) Goran Ivanišević (semifinals)

== Draw ==
Key

- Q = Qualifier
- WC = Wild card
- LL = Lucky loser
- Alt = Alternate
- ITF = ITF entry
- PR = Protected ranking
- SR = Special ranking
- SE = Special exempt
- JE = Junior exempt
- JR = Junior Accelerator Programme entrant
- CO = College Accelerator Programme entrant
- NG = Next Gen Accelerator Program entrant
- w/o = Walkover
- r = Retired
- d = Defaulted

=== Finals ===
Semifinals
1	(United States) Pete Sampras	6	6
6	(Ukraine) Andrei Medvedev	3	0
3	(Germany) Michael Stich	7^{7}	7^{12}
8	(Croatia) Goran Ivanišević	6^{2}	6^{10}

Final
1	(United States) Pete Sampras	6^{3}	6	6^{7}	2
3	(Germany) Michael Stich	7^{7}	2	7^{9}	6

=== Arthur Ashe group ===
		(United States) Sampras	(Spain) Bruguera	(Sweden) Edberg	(Croatia) Ivanišević	RR; W–L	Set; W–L	Game; W–L	Standings
1	(United States) Pete Sampras		6–3, 1–6, 6–3	6–3, 7–6^{(7–3)}	6–3, 4–6, 6–2	3–0	6–2	42–32	1
4	(Spain) Sergi Bruguera	3–6, 6–1, 3–6		2–6, 4–6	4–6, 6–7^{(4–7)}	0–3	1–6	28–38	4
5	(Sweden) Stefan Edberg	3–6, 6–7^{(3–7)}	6–2, 6–4		6–7^{(3–7)}, 7–6^{(7–5)}, 3–6	1–2	3–4	37–38	3
8	(Croatia) Goran Ivanišević	3–6, 6–4, 2–6	6–4, 7–6^{(7–4)}	7–6^{(7–3)}, 6–7^{(5–7)}, 6–3		2–1	5–4	43–42	2

Standings are determined by: 1. number of wins; 2. number of matches; 3. in two-players-ties, head-to-head records; 4. in three-players-ties, percentage of sets won, or of games won; 5. steering-committee decision.

=== Stan Smith group ===
		(Germany) Stich	(Ukraine) Medvedev	(United States) Courier	(United States) Chang	RR; W–L	Set; W–L	Game; W–L	Standings
3	(Germany) Michael Stich		6–3, 6–4	7–5, 6–4	4–6, 7–6^{(7–3)}, 6–2	3–0	6–1	42–30	1
6	(Ukraine) Andrei Medvedev	3–6, 4–6		6–3, 1–6, 7–6^{(7–4)}	2–6, 6–4, 6–2	2–1	4–4	35–39	2
2	(United States) Jim Courier	5–7, 4–6	3–6, 6–1, 6–7^{(4–7)}		4–6, 0–6	0–3	1–6	28–39	4
7	(United States) Michael Chang	6–4, 6–7^{(3–7)}, 2–6	6–2, 4–6, 2–6	6–4, 6–0		1–2	4–4	36–35	3

== See also ==
- ATP World Tour Finals appearances
