= 1992 ATP Tour World Championships – Singles =

Singles
- 1992 ATP Tour World Championships

Final
- Champion: (Germany) Boris Becker
- Runner-up: (United States) Jim Courier
- Score: 6–4, 6–3, 7–5

Details
- Draw: 8

Events
Singles	Doubles
← 1991 ·	ATP Finals	· 1993 →

Boris Becker defeated Jim Courier in the final, 6–4, 6–3, 7–5 to win the singles tennis title at the 1992 ATP Tour World Championships.

Pete Sampras was the defending champion, but was defeated by Courier in the semifinals.

== Seeds ==
1. (United States) Jim Courier (final)
2. (Sweden) Stefan Edberg (round robin)
3. (United States) Pete Sampras (semifinals)
4. (Croatia) Goran Ivanišević (semifinals)
5. (United States) Michael Chang (round robin)
6. (Czechoslovakia) Petr Korda (round robin)
7. (Germany) Boris Becker (champion)
8. (Netherlands) Richard Krajicek (round robin)

== Draw ==
Key

- Q = Qualifier
- WC = Wild card
- LL = Lucky loser
- Alt = Alternate
- ITF = ITF entry
- PR = Protected ranking
- SR = Special ranking
- SE = Special exempt
- JE = Junior exempt
- JR = Junior Accelerator Programme entrant
- CO = College Accelerator Programme entrant
- NG = Next Gen Accelerator Program entrant
- w/o = Walkover
- r = Retired
- d = Defaulted

=== Finals ===
Semifinals
4	(Croatia) Goran Ivanišević	6	4	6^{7}
7	(Germany) Boris Becker	4	6	7^{9}
3	(United States) Pete Sampras	6^{5}	6^{4}
1	(United States) Jim Courier	7^{7}	7^{7}

Final
7	(Germany) Boris Becker	6	6	7
1	(United States) Jim Courier	4	3	5

=== Rod Laver group ===
		(United States) Courier	(Croatia) Ivanišević	(United States) Chang	(Netherlands) Krajicek	RR; W–L	Set; W–L	Game; W–L	Standings
1	(United States) Jim Courier		3–6, 3–6	7–5, 6–2	6–7(4), 7–6(1), 7–5	2–1	4–3	39–37	2
4	(Croatia) Goran Ivanišević	6–3, 6–3		7–6(4), 6–2	6–4, 6–3	3–0	6–0	37–21	1
5	(United States) Michael Chang	5–7, 2–6	6–7(4), 2–6		6–2, 3–6, 6–7(4)	0–3	1–6	30–41	4
8	(Netherlands) Richard Krajicek	7–6(4), 6–7(1), 5–7	4–6, 3–6	2–6, 6–3, 7–6(4)		1–2	3–5	40–47	3

Standings are determined by: 1. number of wins; 2. number of matches; 3. in two-players-ties, head-to-head records; 4. in three-players-ties, percentage of sets won, or of games won; 5. steering-committee decision.

=== Ken Rosewall group ===
		(Sweden) Edberg	(United States) Sampras	(Czechoslovakia) Korda	(Germany) Becker	RR; W–L	Set; W–L	Game; W–L	Standings
2	(Sweden) Stefan Edberg		3–6, 6–3, 5–7	6–3, 7–6(9)	4–6, 0–6	1–2	3–4	31–37	3
3	(United States) Pete Sampras	6–3, 3–6, 7–5		3–6, 6–3, 6–3	7–6(5), 7–6(3)	3–0	6–2	45–38	1
6	(Czechoslovakia) Petr Korda	3–6, 6–7(9)	6–3, 3–6, 3–6		4–6, 2–6	0–3	1–6	27–40	4
7	(Germany) Boris Becker	6–4, 6–0	6–7(5), 6–7(3)	6–4, 6–2		2–1	4–2	36–24	2

Standings are determined by: 1. number of wins; 2. number of matches; 3. in two-players-ties, head-to-head records; 4. in three-players-ties, percentage of sets won, or of games won; 5. steering-committee decision.

== See also ==
- ATP World Tour Finals appearances
