= Axel Finnberg =

German former professional tennis player

- Country (sports): Germany
- Born: 5 April 1971 (age 54)
- Plays: Right-handed
- Prize money: $21,769

Singles
- Career record: 1–4
- Highest ranking: No. 231 (10 October 1994)

Grand Slam singles results
- Australian Open: Q2 (1992, 1994)

Doubles
- Career record: 0–2
- Highest ranking: No. 489 (27 May 1991)

Axel Finnberg (born 5 April 1971) is a German former professional tennis player.

A right-handed player from Bremen, Finnberg played on the professional tour in the 1990s. He made his ATP Tour main draw debut in Adelaide in 1991, where he lost in the first round to Thomas Enqvist.

In 1994 Finnberg reached his career best ranking of 231 in the world and made the second round of the 1994 Oahu Open. He twice featured in the qualifying draw for the Australian Open, including in 1994 when he had a win over Vince Spadea.
