= 1992 Paris Open =

- Date: 2–9 November
- Edition: 20th
- Category: ATP Championship Series, Single-Week
- Draw: 64S / 32D
- Prize money: $1,815,000
- Surface: Carpet / indoor
- Location: Paris, France
- Venue: Palais omnisports de Paris-Bercy

Champions

Singles
- (Germany) Boris Becker

Doubles
- (United States) John McEnroe / (United States) Patrick McEnroe
← 1991 ·	Paris Masters	· 1993 →

The 1992 Paris Open was a men's tennis tournament played on indoor carpet courts. It was the 20th edition of the Paris Masters, and was part of the ATP Super 9 of the 1992 ATP Tour. It took place at the Palais omnisports de Paris-Bercy in Paris, France, from 2 November through 9 November 1992. Ninth-seeded Boris Becker won the singles title.

== Finals ==
=== Singles ===
(Germany) Boris Becker defeated (France) Guy Forget, 7–6^{(7–3)}, 6–3, 3–6, 6–3

- It was Boris Becker's 4th singles title of the year and the 35th of his career.

=== Doubles ===
(United States) John McEnroe / (United States) Patrick McEnroe defeated (United States) Patrick Galbraith / (South Africa) Danie Visser, 6–4, 6–2
