= 1997 Nokia Open – Singles =

Singles
- 1997 Nokia Open

Final
- Champion: (United States) Jim Courier
- Runner-up: (Sweden) Magnus Gustafsson
- Score: 7–6^{(12–10)}, 3–6, 6–3

Details
- Seeds: 8

Events
Singles	Doubles
← 1996 ·	Nokia Open	· 1998 →

Greg Rusedski was the defending champion, but did not participate this year.

First-seeded Jim Courier won the title, beating Magnus Gustafsson 7–6^{(12–10)}, 3–6, 6–3 in the final.

== Seeds ==
1. (United States) Jim Courier (champion)
2. (Australia) Mark Woodforde (first round)
3. (Sweden) Thomas Johansson (semifinals)
4. (Czech Republic) Martin Damm (first round)
5. (Sweden) Magnus Gustafsson (final)
6. (Czech Republic) Jiří Novák (first round)
7. (Australia) Scott Draper (first round)
8. (United States) Richey Reneberg (first round)

== Draw ==
=== Key ===
- Q = Qualifier
- WC = Wild card
- LL = Lucky loser
- Alt = Alternate
- SE = Special exempt
- PR = Protected ranking
- ITF = ITF entry
- JE = Junior exempt
- w/o = Walkover
- r = Retired
- d = Defaulted
- SR = Special ranking

=== Finals ===
Semifinals
1/WC	(United States) Jim Courier	6	6
3	(Sweden) Thomas Johansson	3	4
5	(Sweden) Magnus Gustafsson	6	6
(Denmark) Kenneth Carlsen	2	4

Final
1/WC	(United States) Jim Courier	7^{12}	3	6
5	(Sweden) Magnus Gustafsson	6^{10}	6	3

=== Top half ===
First round
1/WC	(United States) J Courier	6	6
(Germany) A Rădulescu	3	4
(Sweden) P Fredriksson	7	3	0
(South Africa) M Ondruska	5	6	6
(United States) P McEnroe	6	2	6^{4}
Q	(United Kingdom) C Wilkinson	4	6	7^{7}
(Slovakia) J Krošlák	3	6	7^{7}
8	(United States) R Reneberg	6	3	6^{3}
3	(Sweden) T Johansson	7	6
Q	(Sweden) N Kulti	5	3
LL	(United States) A Reichel	4	6	3
(India) L Paes	6	3	6
(United States) J Stark	1	7	3
(South Africa) G Stafford	6	5	6
(Italy) G Pozzi	7^{7}	3	7^{7}
6	(Czech Republic) J Novák	6^{4}	6	6^{5}

Second round
1/WC	(United States) J Courier	6	6
(South Africa) M Ondruska	4	3
Q	(United Kingdom) C Wilkinson	3	7^{8}	1
(Slovakia) J Krošlák	6	6^{6}	6
3	(Sweden) T Johansson	7	6
(India) L Paes	5	1
(South Africa) G Stafford	4	1
(Italy) G Pozzi	6	6

Quarterfinals
1/WC	(United States) J Courier	6	6
(Slovakia) J Krošlák	4	3
3	(Sweden) T Johansson	6	6
(Italy) G Pozzi	2	4

Semifinals
1/WC	(United States) J Courier	6	6
3	(Sweden) T Johansson	3	4

=== Bottom half ===
First round
5	(Sweden) M Gustafsson	7^{7}	1	7^{7}
(Germany) M Sinner	6^{3}	6	6^{5}
WC	(United States) D Wheaton	5	3
Q	(Czech Republic) D Rikl	7	6
(United States) J Gimelstob	4	6	6
Q	(Australia) M Tebbutt	6	3	4
(Zimbabwe) B Black	6	6
4	(Czech Republic) M Damm	4	4
7	(Australia) S Draper	6	4	6^{7}
(United States) A O'Brien	3	6	7^{9}
(Italy) R Furlan	6	6
(Germany) N Kiefer	4	2
WC	(China) J Xia	6^{0}	4
(Sweden) M Tillström	7^{7}	6
(Denmark) K Carlsen	6	7^{7}
2	(Australia) M Woodforde	4	6^{3}

Second round
5	(Sweden) M Gustafsson	6	6
Q	(Czech Republic) D Rikl	2	4
(United States) J Gimelstob	6	5	4
(Zimbabwe) B Black	3	7	6
(United States) A O'Brien	7^{7}	6
(Italy) R Furlan	6^{1}	4
(Sweden) M Tillström	2	0
(Denmark) K Carlsen	6	6

Quarterfinals
5	(Sweden) M Gustafsson	6	6
(Zimbabwe) B Black	4	3
(United States) A O'Brien	5	7	6^{4}
(Denmark) K Carlsen	7	5	7^{7}

Semifinals
5	(Sweden) M Gustafsson	6	6
(Denmark) K Carlsen	2	4
