= 1997 Nokia Open – Doubles =

Doubles
- 1997 Nokia Open

Final
- Champions: (India) Mahesh Bhupathi (India) Leander Paes
- Runners-up: (United States) Jim Courier (United States) Alex O'Brien
- Score: 7–5, 7–6

Events
Singles	Doubles
← 1996 ·	Nokia Open	· 1998 →

Martin Damm and Andrei Olhovskiy were the defending champions, but Olhovskiy did not participate this year. Damm partnered Jiří Novák, losing in the first round.

Mahesh Bhupathi and Leander Paes won the title, defeating Jim Courier and Alex O'Brien 7–5, 7–6 in the final.

== Seeds ==
1. (India) Mahesh Bhupathi / (India) Leander Paes (champions)
2. (Czech Republic) Martin Damm / (Czech Republic) Jiří Novák (first round)
3. (Zimbabwe) Byron Black / (United States) Jonathan Stark (first round)
4. (United States) Richey Reneberg / (Czech Republic) Cyril Suk (quarterfinals)

== Draw ==
=== Key ===
- Q = Qualifier
- WC = Wild card
- LL = Lucky loser
- Alt = Alternate
- SE = Special exempt
- PR = Protected ranking
- ITF = ITF entry
- JE = Junior exempt
- w/o = Walkover
- r = Retired
- d = Defaulted
- SR = Special ranking

=== Draw ===
First round
1	(India) M Bhupathi (India) L Paes	6	6
WC	(China) B Pan (China) Li Lu	2	2
(South Africa) M Ondruska (South Africa) G Stafford	7	3	5
(United States) B Behrens (United States) P McEnroe	6	6	7
3	(Zimbabwe) B Black (United States) J Stark	6	7	4
(United States) M Keil (United States) TJ Middleton	7	6	6
(Denmark) K Carlsen (United States) D Wheaton	7	6
WC	(China) J Xia (China) Lu Ling	6	3
(Sweden) L-A Wahlgren (United Kingdom) C Wilkinson	3	6
WC	(United States) J Courier (United States) A O'Brien	6	7
(Sweden) M Tillström (Sweden) P Fredriksson	5	7	0
4	(United States) R Reneberg (Czech Republic) C Suk	7	6	6
Q	(Australia) S Draper (Australia) P Tramacchi	3	4
(Australia) J Eagle (Australia) A Florent	6	6
(United States) J Gimelstob (Czech Republic) D Rikl	6	6	7
2	(Czech Republic) M Damm (Czech Republic) J Novák	7	4	5

Quarterfinals
1	(India) M Bhupathi (India) L Paes	6	6
(United States) B Behrens (United States) P McEnroe	2	4
(United States) M Keil (United States) TJ Middleton	7	6	6
(Denmark) K Carlsen (United States) D Wheaton	5	7	2
WC	(United States) J Courier (United States) A O'Brien	6	6	7
4	(United States) R Reneberg (Czech Republic) C Suk	7	3	5
(Australia) J Eagle (Australia) A Florent	6	6
(United States) J Gimelstob (Czech Republic) D Rikl	4	1

Semifinals
1	(India) M Bhupathi (India) L Paes	6	6
(United States) M Keil (United States) TJ Middleton	4	4
WC	(United States) J Courier (United States) A O'Brien	w/o
(Australia) J Eagle (Australia) A Florent

Final
1	(India) M Bhupathi (India) L Paes	7	7
WC	(United States) J Courier (United States) A O'Brien	5	6
