= 1991 Paris Open – Singles =

Singles
- 1991 Paris Open

Final
- Champion: (France) Guy Forget
- Runner-up: (United States) Pete Sampras
- Score: 7–6^{(11–9)}, 4–6, 5–7, 6–4, 6–4

Details
- Draw: 48
- Seeds: 16

Events
| Singles | Doubles |
| ← 1990 · | Paris Open | · 1992 → |

Guy Forget defeated Pete Sampras in the final, 7–6^{(11–9)}, 4–6, 5–7, 6–4, 6–4 to win the singles tennis title at the 1991 Paris Open. Forget became the first French champion of the Paris Open.

Stefan Edberg was the defending champion, but lost in the third round to Michael Chang.

== Seeds ==
1. (Sweden) Stefan Edberg (third round)
2. (Germany) Boris Becker (third round, withdrew)
3. (United States) Jim Courier (third round)
4. (Germany) ~~Michael Stich~~ (withdrew)
5. (France) Guy Forget (champion)
6. (United States) Pete Sampras (final)
7. (Spain) Sergi Bruguera (third round)
8. (Czechoslovakia) Karel Nováček (quarterfinals)
9. (Czechoslovakia) Petr Korda (quarterfinals)
10. (United States) David Wheaton (second round)
11. (Socialist Federal Republic of Yugoslavia) Goran Ivanišević (third round)
12. (United States) Derrick Rostagno (third round)
13. (Switzerland) Jakob Hlasek (second round)
14. (United States) Brad Gilbert (second round)
15. (Socialist Federal Republic of Yugoslavia) Goran Prpić (second round)
16. (United States) Michael Chang (semifinals)

== Draw ==
=== Key ===
- Q = Qualifier
- WC = Wild card
- LL = Lucky loser
- Alt = Alternate
- SE = Special exempt
- PR = Protected ranking
- ITF = ITF entry
- JE = Junior exempt
- w/o = Walkover
- r = Retired
- d = Defaulted
- SR = Special ranking

=== Finals ===
Quarterfinals
16 | (United States) Michael Chang | 7 | 6
9 | (Czechoslovakia) Petr Korda | 5 | 1
(Soviet Union) Alexander Volkov | 2 | 3
6 | (United States) Pete Sampras | 6 | 6
5 | (France) Guy Forget | 6 | 3 | 6
(Italy) Omar Camporese | 1 | 6 | 3
8 | (Czechoslovakia) Karel Nováček | 4 | 2
(Sweden) Jonas Svensson | 6 | 6

Semifinals
16 | (United States) Michael Chang | 6 | 4 | 3
6 | (United States) Pete Sampras | 2 | 6 | 6
5 | (France) Guy Forget | 7 | 6
(Sweden) Jonas Svensson | 5 | 4

Final
6 | (United States) Pete Sampras | 6^{9} | 6 | 7 | 4 | 4
5 | (France) Guy Forget | 7^{11} | 4 | 5 | 6 | 6

=== Top half ===
==== Section 1 ====
First round
Q | (United States) J Grabb | 6 | 5 | 6^{2}
Q | (Sweden) T Högstedt | 3 | 7 | 7^{7}
Q | (France) R Gilbert | 2 | 7 | 7
(Sweden) A Järryd | 6 | 5 | 5
Q | (Australia) J Stoltenberg | 3 | 7 | 7^{7}
(Argentina) A Mancini | 6 | 5 | 6^{2}
(Germany) C-U Steeb | 6^{7} | 6 | 4
Q | (Australia) W Masur | 7^{9} | 4 | 6

Second round
1 | (Sweden) S Edberg | 6 | 6^{1} | 6
Q | (Sweden) T Högstedt | 0 | 7^{7} | 3
Q | (France) R Gilbert | 6^{7} | 6 | 6^{1}
16 | (United States) M Chang | 7^{9} | 3 | 7^{7}
9 | (Czechoslovakia) P Korda | 3 | 6 | 7^{7}
Q | (Australia) J Stoltenberg | 6 | 4 | 6^{1}
Q | (Australia) W Masur | 6 | 6^{1} | 2
7 | (Spain) S Bruguera | 4 | 7^{7} | 6

Third round
1 | (Sweden) S Edberg | 6 | 1 | 4
16 | (United States) M Chang | 2 | 6 | 6
9 | (Czechoslovakia) P Korda | 6 | 6
7 | (Spain) S Bruguera | 2 | 4

Quarterfinals
16 | (United States) M Chang | 7 | 6
9 | (Czechoslovakia) P Korda | 5 | 1

==== Section 2 ====
First round
(Soviet Union) A Chesnokov | 4 | 2
WC | (France) A Boetsch | 6 | 6
(Switzerland) M Rosset | 3 | 4
(Soviet Union) A Volkov | 6 | 6
(Sweden) C Bergström | 1 | 6^{4}
(United States) J McEnroe | 6 | 7^{7}
(Soviet Union) A Cherkasov | 6 | 7
(United States) R Reneberg | 4 | 5

Second round
LL | (South Africa) W Ferreira | 5 | 3
WC | (France) A Boetsch | 7 | 6
(Soviet Union) A Volkov | 6 | 2 | 6
14 | (United States) B Gilbert | 2 | 6 | 3
11 | (Socialist Federal Republic of Yugoslavia) G Ivanišević | 6 | 6
(United States) J McEnroe | 4 | 4
(Soviet Union) A Cherkasov | 6^{3} | 2
6 | (United States) P Sampras | 7^{7} | 6

Third round
WC | (France) A Boetsch | 5 | 2
(Soviet Union) A Volkov | 7 | 6
11 | (Socialist Federal Republic of Yugoslavia) G Ivanišević | 3 | 7^{7} | 6^{5}
6 | (United States) P Sampras | 6 | 6^{5} | 7^{7}

Quarterfinals
(Soviet Union) A Volkov | 2 | 3
6 | (United States) P Sampras | 6 | 6

=== Bottom half ===
==== Section 3 ====
First round
(United States) P McEnroe | 6 | 7^{7}
(Argentina) M Jaite | 3 | 6^{5}
WC | (France) Y Noah | 7 | 6
(France) F Santoro | 5 | 3
(Italy) O Camporese | 7^{7} | 1 | 6
(France) T Champion | 6^{1} | 6 | 4
(Haiti) R Agénor | 7 | 4 | 2
WC | (United States) J Connors | 5 | 6 | 6

Second round
5 | (France) G Forget | 6 | 6
(United States) P McEnroe | 3 | 2
WC | (France) Y Noah | 3 | 3
12 | (United States) D Rostagno | 6 | 6
13 | (Switzerland) J Hlasek | 6^{5} | 6 | 3
(Italy) O Camporese | 7^{7} | 4 | 6
WC | (United States) J Connors | 2 | 3
3 | (United States) J Courier | 6 | 6

Third round
5 | (France) G Forget | 4 | 6 | 6
12 | (United States) D Rostagno | 6 | 3 | 1
(Italy) O Camporese | 7^{7} | 6
3 | (United States) J Courier | 6^{4} | 3

Quarterfinals
5 | (France) G Forget | 6 | 3 | 6
(Italy) O Camporese | 1 | 6 | 3

==== Section 4 ====
First round
(United States) M Washington | 7^{7} | 6
(Australia) T Woodbridge | 6^{2} | 2
WC | (France) C Pioline | 6^{7} | 2
Q | (Sweden) N Kulti | 7^{9} | 6
(Netherlands) R Krajicek | 3 | 2
(Sweden) J Svensson | 6 | 6
(Netherlands) J Siemerink | 2 | 6 | 4
(Austria) H Skoff | 6 | 0 | 6

Second round
8 | (Czechoslovakia) K Nováček | 6 | 6
(United States) M Washington | 4 | 4
Q | (Sweden) N Kulti | 6 | 6
10 | (United States) D Wheaton | 3 | 3
15 | (Socialist Federal Republic of Yugoslavia) G Prpić | 2 | 2
(Sweden) J Svensson | 6 | 6
(Austria) H Skoff | 2 | 4
2 | (Germany) B Becker | 6 | 6

Third round
8 | (Czechoslovakia) K Nováček | 6 | 6
Q | (Sweden) N Kulti | 3 | 2
(Sweden) J Svensson | w/o
2 | (Germany) B Becker

Quarterfinals
8 | (Czechoslovakia) K Nováček | 4 | 2
(Sweden) J Svensson | 6 | 6
