= 1992 Paris Open – Singles =

Singles
- 1992 Paris Open

Final
- Champion: (Germany) Boris Becker
- Runner-up: (France) Guy Forget
- Score: 7–6^{(7–3)}, 6–3, 3–6, 6–3

Details
- Draw: 48
- Seeds: 16

Events
Singles	Doubles
← 1991 ·	Paris Open	· 1993 →

Boris Becker defeated the defending champion Guy Forget in the final, 7–6^{(7–3)}, 6–3, 3–6, 6–3 to win the singles tennis title at the 1992 Paris Open.

== Seeds ==
A champion seed is indicated in bold text while text in italics indicates the round in which that seed was eliminated.

1. (United States) Jim Courier (quarterfinals)
2. (United States) Pete Sampras (second round)
3. (Sweden) Stefan Edberg (quarterfinals)
4. (United States) Michael Chang (second round)
5. (Czechoslovakia) Petr Korda (second round)
6. (Croatia) Goran Ivanišević (semifinals)
7. (United States) Andre Agassi (second round)
8. (South Africa) Wayne Ferreira (second round)
9. (Germany) **Boris Becker (champion)**
10. (United States) MaliVai Washington (second round)
11. (France) Guy Forget (final)
12. (Netherlands) Richard Krajicek (third round)
13. (Spain) Carlos Costa (second round)
14. (Commonwealth of Independent States) Alexander Volkov (third round)
15. (Spain) Sergi Bruguera (second round)
16. (Germany) Michael Stich (third round)

== Draw ==
=== Key ===
- Q = Qualifier
- WC = Wild card
- LL = Lucky loser
- Alt = Alternate
- SE = Special exempt
- PR = Protected ranking
- ITF = ITF entry
- JE = Junior exempt
- w/o = Walkover
- r = Retired
- d = Defaulted
- SR = Special ranking
- NB: The Final was the best of 5 sets.

=== Finals ===
Quarterfinals
1	(United States) Jim Courier	6^{5}	3
9	**(Germany) Boris Becker**	**7^{7}**	**6**
(United States) David Wheaton	4	3
6	**(Croatia) Goran Ivanišević**	**6**	**6**
11	**(France) Guy Forget**	6^{5}	**7^{7}**	**6**
3	(Sweden) Stefan Edberg	**7^{7}**	6^{3}	3
**(Switzerland) Jakob Hlasek**	w/o
WC	(France) Henri Leconte

Semifinals
9	(Germany) **Boris Becker**	**6**	**6**
6	(Croatia) Goran Ivanišević	1	2
11	(France) **Guy Forget**	**6**	**7^{7}**
(Switzerland) Jakob Hlasek	3	6^{1}

Final
9	(Germany) **Boris Becker**	**7^{7}**	**6**	3	**6**
11	(France) Guy Forget	6^{3}	3	**6**	3

=== Top half ===
==== Section 1 ====
First round
(Czechoslovakia) K Nováček	**7**	1	1
(Commonwealth of Independent States) **A Chesnokov**	5	**6**	**6**
(Netherlands) P Haarhuis	6^{4}	6^{5}
(Sweden) **M Larsson**	**7^{7}**	**7^{7}**
(Australia) M Woodforde	3	**6**	3
(United States) **J McEnroe**	**6**	3	**6**
(United States) **B Gilbert**	**6**	**6**
Q	(France) G Raoux	1	1

Second round
1	(United States) **J Courier**	**6**	**6**
(Commonwealth of Independent States) A Chesnokov	3	0
(Sweden) M Larsson	**6**	6^{8}	4
16	(Germany) **M Stich**	4	**7^{10}**	**6**
9	(Germany) **B Becker**	**6**	**6**
(United States) J McEnroe	4	4
(United States) **B Gilbert**	**6**	**6**
7/WC	(United States) A Agassi	1	2

Third round
1	(United States) **J Courier**	**7^{7}**	**6**
16	(Germany) M Stich	6^{3}	1
9	(Germany) **B Becker**	**6**	**6**
(United States) B Gilbert	2	2

Quarterfinals
1	(United States) J Courier	6^{5}	3
9	(Germany) **B Becker**	**7^{7}**	**6**

==== Section 2 ====
First round
(United States) **D Wheaton**	**7^{7}**	**7^{7}**
(Spain) J Sánchez	6^{3}	6^{4}
(Commonwealth of Independent States) A Cherkasov	6^{4}	4
(Spain) **E Sánchez**	**7^{7}**	**6**
(Germany) C-U Steeb	3	**6**	3
(Israel) **A Mansdorf**	**6**	3	**6**
(Italy) O Camporese	6^{4}	**6**	3
WC	(France) **C Pioline**	**7^{7}**	3	**6**

Second round
4	(United States) M Chang	1	**6**	3
(United States) **D Wheaton**	**6**	1	**6**
(Spain) E Sánchez	3	4
14	(Commonwealth of Independent States) **A Volkov**	**6**	**6**
12	(Netherlands) **R Krajicek**	**6**	**6**
(Israel) A Mansdorf	4	2
WC	(France) C Pioline	4	5
6	(Croatia) **G Ivanišević**	**6**	**7**

Third round
(United States) **D Wheaton**	**7**	**6**
14	(Commonwealth of Independent States) A Volkov	5	4
12	(Netherlands) R Krajicek	4	6^{2}
6	(Croatia) **G Ivanišević**	**6**	**7^{7}**

Quarterfinals
(United States) D Wheaton	4	3
6	(Croatia) **G Ivanišević**	**6**	**6**

=== Bottom half ===
==== Section 3 ====
First round
(France) **A Boetsch**	**6**	**6**
(Spain) F Clavet	3	3
Q	(Italy) S Pescosolido	2	6^{1}
Q	(France) **O Delaître**	**6**	**7^{7}**
(United States) **D Rostagno**	**6**	**6**
Q	(Sweden) N Kulti	4	3
(France) F Santoro	**6**	4	3
(Commonwealth of Independent States) **A Medvedev**	3	**6**	**6**

Second round
5	(Czechoslovakia) P Korda	5	4
(France) **A Boetsch**	**7**	**6**
Q	(France) O Delaître	**6**	3	6^{6}
11	(France) **G Forget**	4	**6**	**7^{8}**
13	(Spain) C Costa	3	5
(United States) **D Rostagno**	**6**	**7**
(Commonwealth of Independent States) A Medvedev	1	**6**	1
3	(Sweden) **S Edberg**	**6**	1	**6**

Third round
(France) A Boetsch	2	4
11	(France) **G Forget**	**6**	**6**
(United States) D Rostagno	6^{2}	6^{6}
3	(Sweden) **S Edberg**	**7^{7}**	**7^{8}**

Quarterfinals
11	(France) **G Forget**	6^{5}	**7^{7}**	**6**
3	(Sweden) S Edberg	**7^{7}**	6^{3}	3

==== Section 4 ====
First round
(Austria) T Muster	3	4
(Switzerland) **J Hlasek**	**6**	**6**
(Argentina) G Markus	3	2
Q	(United States) **J Grabb**	**6**	**6**
(Australia) **W Masur**	**6**	**6**
WC	(Switzerland) M Rosset	3	4
Q	(United States) J Tarango	**6**	1	4
WC	(France) **H Leconte**	4	**6**	**6**

Second round
8	(South Africa) W Ferreira	3	**6**	3
(Switzerland) **J Hlasek**	**6**	3	**6**
Q	(United States) **J Grabb**	4	**6**	**6**
10	(United States) M Washington	**6**	4	0
15	(Spain) S Bruguera	3	5
(Australia) **W Masur**	**6**	**7**
WC	(France) **H Leconte**	**6**	**7**
2	(United States) P Sampras	3	5

Third round
(Switzerland) **J Hlasek**	4	**6**	**6**
Q	(United States) J Grabb	**6**	1	2
(Australia) W Masur	4	6^{5}
WC	(France) **H Leconte**	**6**	**7^{7}**

Quarterfinals
(Switzerland) **J Hlasek**	w/o
WC	(France) H Leconte
