= The Championships at the Palisades =

The Championships at the Palisades is an event in the Outback Champions Series for senior tennis players. It was held from 2006 through 2009 in Charlotte, North Carolina.

== Finals results ==
Year	Champion	Runner-up	Score
2009	Jim Courier	Pete Sampras	3-6, 6-4, 10-8(TB)
2008	Jim Courier	Todd Martin	6-2, 3-6, 10-5(TB)
2007	Pete Sampras	Todd Martin	6-3, 6-4
2006	Jim Courier	Todd Martin	5-7, 7-6(6), 10-4 (TB)
