= 1991 ATP Tour World Championships – Singles =

Singles
- 1991 ATP Tour World Championships

Final
- Champion: (United States) Pete Sampras
- Runner-up: (United States) Jim Courier
- Score: 3–6, 7–6^{(7–5)}, 6–3, 6–4

Details
- Draw: 8

Events
Singles	Doubles
← 1990 ·	ATP Finals	· 1992 →

Pete Sampras defeated Jim Courier in the final, 3–6, 7–6^{(7–5)}, 6–3, 6–4 to win the singles title at the 1991 ATP Tour World Championships. It was his first Tour Finals title.

Andre Agassi was the defending champion, but was defeated by Courier in the semifinals.

== Draw ==
=== Finals ===
Semifinals
4	(Czech Republic) Ivan Lendl	2	3
6	(United States) Pete Sampras	6	6
7	(United States) Andre Agassi	3	5
1	(United States) Jim Courier	6	7

Final
6	(United States) Pete Sampras	3	7	6	6
1	(United States) Jim Courier	6	6^{5}	3	4

=== Ilie Năstase group ===
		(United States) Courier	(Czechoslovakia) Lendl	(France) Forget	(Czechoslovakia) Nováček	RR; W–L	Set; W–L	Game; W–L	Standings
1	(United States) Jim Courier		2–6, 3–6	7–6^{(7–4)}, 6–4	6–7^{(6–8)}, 7–6^{(7–5)}, 6–4	2–1	4–3	37–39	2
4	(Czechoslovakia) Ivan Lendl	6–2, 6–3		6–2, 6–4	6–2, 6–2	3–0	6–0	36–15	1
5	(France) Guy Forget	6–7^{(4–7)}, 4–6	2–6, 4–6		6–3, 7–6^{(7–3)}	1–2	2–4	29–34	3
8	(Czechoslovakia) Karel Nováček	7–6^{(8–6)}, 6–7^{(5–7)}, 4–6	2–6, 2–6	3–6, 6–7^{(3–7)}		0–3	1–6	30–44	4

Standings are determined by: 1. number of wins; 2. number of matches; 3. in two-players-ties, head-to-head records; 4. in three-players-ties, percentage of sets won, or of games won; 5. steering-committee decision.

=== John Newcombe group ===
		(Germany) Becker	(Germany) Stich	(United States) Sampras	(United States) Agassi	RR; W–L	Set; W–L	Game; W–L	Standings
2	(Germany) Boris Becker		7–6^{(7–1)}, 6–3	6–4, 6–7^{(3–7)}, 6–1	3–6, 5–7	2–1	4–3	39–34	3
3	(Germany) Michael Stich	6–7^{(1–7)}, 3–6		2–6, 6–7^{(3–7)}	5–7, 3–6	0–3	0–6	25–39	4
6	(United States) Pete Sampras	4–6, 7–6^{(7–3)}, 1–6	6–2, 7–6^{(7–3)}		6–3, 1–6, 6–3	2–1	5–3	38–38	2
7	(United States) Andre Agassi	6–3, 7–5	7–5, 6–3	3–6, 6–1, 3–6		2–1	5–2	38–29	1

Standings are determined by: 1. number of wins; 2. number of matches; 3. in two-players-ties, head-to-head records; 4. in three-players-ties, percentage of sets won, or of games won; 5. steering-committee decision.

== See also ==
- ATP World Tour Finals appearances
