= 1994 Hawaii Open =

Men's tennis tournament in Hawaii, US

1994 Oahu Open
- Date: January 3–9
- Edition: 1st
- Category: World Series
- Draw: 32S / 16D
- Prize money: $288,750
- Surface: Hard / outdoor
- Location: Oahu, Hawaii, U.S.
- Venue: Turtle Bay Hilton

Champions

Singles
- (South Africa) Wayne Ferreira

Doubles
- (Netherlands) Tom Nijssen / (Czech Republic) Cyril Suk
- Oahu Open

The 1994 Oahu Open was a men's tennis tournament played on outdoor hard courts. It was the only edition of the Oahu Open, and was part of the World Series of the 1994 ATP Tour. It took place at the Turtle Bay Hilton in Oahu, Hawaii in the United States, from January 3 through January 9, 1994.

The singles featured Queen's Club runner-up, Sydney Indoor semifinalist and Antwerp doubles finalist Wayne Ferreira, Indianapolis and Vienna quarterfinalist Richey Reneberg, and Kuala Lumpur runner-up Jonas Svensson. Also competing in the draw were Beijing semifinalist Brad Gilbert, Bolzano champion Jonathan Stark, Fabrice Santoro, Renzo Furlan and Patrick McEnroe.

== Finals ==
=== Singles ===
(South Africa) Wayne Ferreira defeated (United States) Richey Reneberg 6–4, 6–7^{(3–7)}, 6–1

- It was Ferreira's 1st singles title of the year and the 3rd of his career.

=== Doubles ===
(Netherlands) Tom Nijssen / (Czech Republic) Cyril Suk defeated (United States) Alex O'Brien / (United States) Jonathan Stark 6–4, 6–4
