= 1992 Paris Open – Doubles =

Doubles
- 1992 Paris Open

Final
- Champions: (United States) John McEnroe; (United States) Patrick McEnroe
- Runners-up: (United States) Patrick Galbraith; (South Africa) Danie Visser
- Score: 6–4, 6–2

Details
- Draw: 24
- Seeds: 8

Events
Singles	Doubles
- Paris Open

John Fitzgerald and Anders Järryd were the defending champions, but lost in the semifinals this year.

John McEnroe and Patrick McEnroe won in the final 6–4, 6–2, against Patrick Galbraith and Danie Visser.

== Seeds ==
All seeds receive a bye into the second round.

1. (United States) Jim Grabb / (United States) Richey Reneberg (semifinals)
2. (Australia) Todd Woodbridge / (Australia) Mark Woodforde (second round)
3. (United States) Kelly Jones / (United States) Rick Leach (second round)
4. (Switzerland) Jakob Hlasek / (Switzerland) Marc Rosset (second round)
5. (Australia) John Fitzgerald / (Sweden) Anders Järryd (semifinals)
6. (United States) John McEnroe / (United States) Patrick McEnroe (champions)
7. (Spain) Sergio Casal / (Spain) Emilio Sánchez (second round)
8. (Australia) Mark Kratzmann / (Australia) Wally Masur (quarterfinals)

== Draw ==
Key

- Q = Qualifier
- WC = Wild card
- LL = Lucky loser
- Alt = Alternate
- ITF = ITF entry
- PR = Protected ranking
- SR = Special ranking
- SE = Special exempt
- JE = Junior exempt
- JR = Junior Accelerator Programme entrant
- CO = College Accelerator Programme entrant
- NG = Next Gen Accelerator Program entrant
- w/o = Walkover
- r = Retired
- d = Defaulted

=== Finals ===
Semifinals

Final

1
- (United States) Jim Grabb
- (United States) Richey Reneberg
3
6

6
- (United States) John McEnroe
- (United States) Patrick McEnroe
6
7

6
- (United States) John McEnroe
- (United States) Patrick McEnroe
6
6

- (United States) Patrick Galbraith
- (South Africa) Danie Visser
4
2

5
- (Australia) John Fitzgerald
- (Sweden) Anders Järryd
3
6

- (United States) Patrick Galbraith
- (South Africa) Danie Visser
6
7

=== Top half ===
First round

Second round

Quarterfinals

Semifinals

1
- (United States) J Grabb
- (United States) R Reneberg
6
6

- (United States) K Flach
- (United States) J Palmer
7
7

- (United States) K Flach
- (United States) J Palmer
4
2

Q
- (Italy) D Nargiso
- (Spain) J Sánchez
6
6

1
- (United States) J Grabb
- (United States) R Reneberg
7
6

- (Socialist Federal Republic of Yugoslavia) G Ivanišević
- (Germany) M Stich
6
6
7

8
- (Australia) M Kratzmann
- (Australia) W Masur
6
3

- (United States) S DeVries
- (Australia) D Macpherson
4
7
6

- (Socialist Federal Republic of Yugoslavia) G Ivanišević
- (Germany) M Stich
7
6
6

8
- (Australia) M Kratzmann
- (Australia) W Masur
6
7
7

1
- (United States) J Grabb
- (United States) R Reneberg
3
6

6
- (United States) J McEnroe
- (United States) P McEnroe
6
7

3
- (United States) K Jones
- (United States) R Leach
7
5

- (United States) L Jensen
- (Australia) L Warder
5
2

WC
- (France) A Boetsch
- (France) O Delaître
5
7
7

WC
- (France) A Boetsch
- (France) O Delaître
7
6

WC
- (France) A Boetsch
- (France) O Delaître
6
6
6

LL
- (France) R Gilbert
- (France) G Raoux
7
7

6
- (United States) J McEnroe
- (United States) P McEnroe
4
7
7

- (United States) K Kinnear
- (South Africa) B Talbot
6
6

LL
- (France) R Gilbert
- (France) G Raoux
4
4

6
- (United States) J McEnroe
- (United States) P McEnroe
6
6

=== Bottom half ===
First round

Second round

Quarterfinals

Semifinals

5
- (Australia) J Fitzgerald
- (Sweden) A Järryd
6
6
6

- (Canada) G Connell
- (Canada) G Michibata
3
7
6

- (Canada) G Connell
- (Canada) G Michibata
7
1
4

- (Netherlands) J Eltingh
- (Netherlands) P Haarhuis
6
5
3

5
- (Australia) J Fitzgerald
- (Sweden) A Järryd
6
6

- (Sweden) R Båthman
- (Belgium) L Pimek
6
3

- (Netherlands) T Nijssen
- (Czechoslovakia) C Suk
2
4

- (Netherlands) T Nijssen
- (Czechoslovakia) C Suk
7
6

- (Netherlands) T Nijssen
- (Czechoslovakia) C Suk
6
6

4
- (Switzerland) J Hlasek
- (Switzerland) M Rosset
4
2

5
- (Australia) J Fitzgerald
- (Sweden) A Järryd
3
6

- (United States) P Galbraith
- (South Africa) D Visser
6
7

7
- (Spain) S Casal
- (Spain) E Sánchez
6
3

- (South Africa) D Adams
- (Commonwealth of Independent States) A Olhovskiy
4
4

- (United States) P Galbraith
- (South Africa) D Visser
7
6

- (United States) P Galbraith
- (South Africa) D Visser
6
6

- (United States) P Galbraith
- (South Africa) D Visser
6
6
6

- (South Africa) W Ferreira
- (South Africa) P Norval
6
7

- (South Africa) W Ferreira
- (South Africa) P Norval
2
7
1

WC
- (United States) A Agassi
- (Germany) B Becker
4
6

- (South Africa) W Ferreira
- (South Africa) P Norval
6
7

2
- (Australia) T Woodbridge
- (Australia) M Woodforde
3
5
