= Oahu Open =

Defunct tennis tournament
- Tour: ATP World Series (1994)
- Founded: 1994
- Abolished: 1994
- Editions: 1
- Location: Honolulu, Hawaii, US
- Venue: Turtle Bay Hilton
- Surface: Hard
- Draw: 32S/16Q/16D
- Prize money: $288,750

The Oahu Open is a defunct tennis tournament that was part of ATP World Series and it was played for only one year in 1994. The event was played on outdoor hard courts at the Turtle Bay Hilton in Oahu, Hawaii in the United States. Wayne Ferreira won the singles title, while Tom Nijssen and Cyril Suk partnered to win the doubles.

== Finals ==
=== Singles ===
Year	Champions	Runners-up	Score
1994	(South Africa) Wayne Ferreira	(United States) Richey Reneberg	6–4, 6–7, 6–1

=== Doubles ===
Year	Champions	Runners-up	Score
1994	(Netherlands) Tom Nijssen (Czech Republic) Cyril Suk	(United States) Alex O'Brien (United States) Jonathan Stark	6–4, 6–4

== See also ==
- Hawaii Open
