= Wayne Ferreira =

South African tennis player

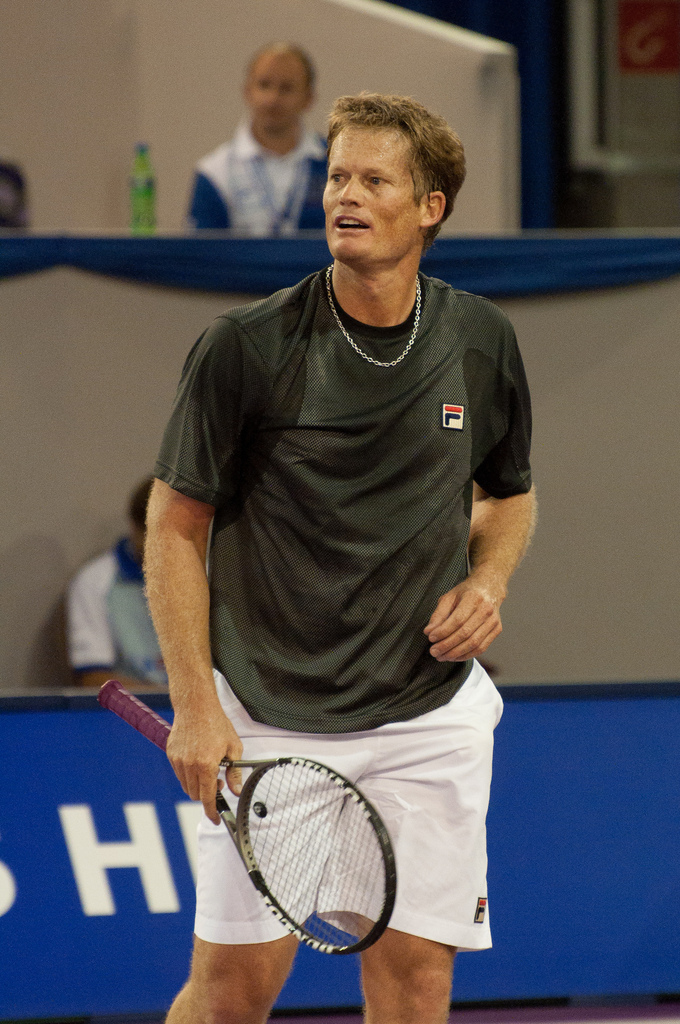
- Country (sports): South Africa
- Residence: Lafayette, California, US
- Born: 15 September 1971 (age 55) Johannesburg, South Africa
- Height: 1.85 m (6 ft 1 in)
- Turned pro: 1989
- Retired: 2005
- Plays: Right-handed (two-handed backhand)
- Prize money: US$ 9,969,617

Singles
- Career record: 512–330
- Career titles: 15
- Highest ranking: No. 6 (8 May 1995)

Grand Slam singles results
- Australian Open: SF (1992, 2003)
- French Open: 4R (1996)
- Wimbledon: QF (1994)
- US Open: QF (1992)

Other tournaments
- Tour Finals: RR (1995)
- Grand Slam Cup: QF (1993)
- Olympic Games: QF (1996)

Doubles
- Career record: 295–210
- Career titles: 11
- Highest ranking: No. 9 (19 March 2001)

Grand Slam doubles results
- Australian Open: 3R (1993, 1996, 2000, 2001)
- French Open: QF (2000)
- Wimbledon: SF (1991, 1994)
- US Open: SF (1994, 2000)

Team competitions
- Hopman Cup: W (2000)
Medal record
Olympic Games
Silver medal – second place	1992 Barcelona	Doubles

Wayne Richard Ferreira (born 15 September 1971) is a South African tennis coach and a former professional player. Ferreira won 15 ATP singles titles and 11 doubles titles. His career-high rankings were world No. 6 in singles (in May 1995) and world No. 9 in doubles (in March 2001).

== Junior career ==
As a junior player, Ferreira was ranked world No. 1 junior doubles player and No. 6 junior singles player. He won the junior doubles title at the US Open in 1989.

== Professional career ==
Ferreira turned professional in 1989. He won his first ATP doubles title in Adelaide in 1991.

1992 was Ferreira's breakthrough year on the ATP Tour. He started out by reaching the semifinals of the Australian Open. In June he won his first ATP singles title at Queen's Club, London. His second singles title came just a few weeks later at Schenectady, New York. He also teamed-up with compatriot Piet Norval to win the men's doubles silver medal for South Africa at the 1992 Summer Olympics in Barcelona. Ferreira was defeated in the second round in the Olympic singles that year.

After 1993, when he didn't win any singles titles, in 1994 he won a career-best five singles titles. He then won another four events in 1995. He competed at the Olympics again in 1996, reaching the quarterfinals in both men's singles and men's doubles, with Ellis Ferreira as his partner. (The two Ferreiras are not related.)

The biggest titles of Ferreira's career came at Toronto in 1996 and Stuttgart in 2000 (both Tennis Masters Series events).

Ferreira teamed up with Amanda Coetzer in 2000 to win the Hopman Cup for South Africa. He played in his third and final Olympic tournament that year; this time, competing only in singles and being defeated in the first round.

Ferreira is the former record-holder for the most consecutive Grand Slam tournament appearances in men's tennis, having participated in 56 consecutive slams between the 1991 Australian Open and the 2004 US Open. Ferreira's best Grand Slam results came at the Australian Open – where he reached the semifinals twice in 1992 and 2003.

Ferreira was known for regularly causing upsets against top players. He is one of the few players with a positive record against 20 time Grand Slam champion, Roger Federer. Ferreira teamed up with Federer in the men's doubles at Wimbledon in 2001. They got to the third round and were due to face Donald Johnson and Jared Palmer (the eventual champions) before Federer withdrew to focus on his singles campaign. In addition, Ferreira has a 5-6 head-to-head record against 14 time Grand Slam champion Pete Sampras, with Sampras breaking the tie by winning their final match at the 2002 Canadian Masters. He also holds a positive head-to-head record against multiple Grand Slam champions and former world No. 1 ranked players, including Patrick Rafter, Yevgeny Kafelnikov, John McEnroe, Ivan Lendl and Björn Borg.

Though Ferreira retired from the professional tour in 2005, he still played on the Outback Champions Series senior tour. He finished both 2006 and 2007 fourth on points in that series.

== Coaching ==
Starting in 2020, Ferreira was the coach of Frances Tiafoe and became his primary coach, replacing coach Zack Evenden, until the end of the 2023 season when they split. During that period Tiafoe won two titles and became a top 10 player.

He coached Jack Draper on a trial basis, starting in May 2024, that ended prior to the 2024 US Open. During that period Draper won his maiden ATP title in June 2024.

He did a trial with Yosuke Watanuki during the 2025 Sunshine Double. He has coached Alexei Popyrin.

Since June 2026 he is coaching Brandon Nakashima. During that time Nakashima reached a Masters 1000 final.

== Endorsements ==
Ferreira played with and endorsed rackets made by Slazenger early in his career. He switched to Dunlop Sport very early in his career and stayed with them, using the 200G racket, until the end of his ATP career.

== Career statistics ==
=== Olympic games ===
Finals: 1 (1 silver medal)

Result	Year	Olympics	Surface	Partner	Opponents	Score
Silver	1992	Barcelona	Clay	Piet Norval (RSA)	(Germany) Boris Becker (Germany) Michael Stich	6–7^{(5–7)}, 6–4, 6–7^{(5–7)}, 3–6

=== Masters Series finals ===
==== Singles: 3 (2–1) ====
Result	Year	Tournament	Surface	Opponent	Score
Loss	1993	Indian Wells	Hard	(United States) Jim Courier	3–6, 3–6, 1–6
Win	1996	Canada	Hard	(Australia) Todd Woodbridge	6–2, 6–4
Win	2000	Stuttgart	Hard (i)	(Australia) Lleyton Hewitt	7–6^{(8–6)}, 3–6, 6–7^{(5–7)}, 7–6^{(7–2)}, 6–2

==== Doubles: 12 (6–6) ====
Result	Year	Tournament	Surface	Partner	Opponents	Score
Win	1991	Miami	Hard	(South Africa) Piet Norval	(United States) Ken Flach (United States) Robert Seguso	5–7, 7–6, 6–2
Loss	1992	Rome	Clay	(Australia) Mark Kratzmann	(Switzerland) Jakob Hlasek (Switzerland) Marc Rosset	4–6, 6–3, 1–6
Loss	1993	Rome	Clay	(Australia) Mark Kratzmann	(Netherlands) Jacco Eltingh (Netherlands) Paul Haarhuis	4–6, 6–7
Loss	1994	Rome	Clay	(Spain) Javier Sánchez	(Russia) Yevgeny Kafelnikov (Czech Republic) David Rikl	1–6, 5–7
Loss	1994	Cincinnati	Hard	(Australia) Mark Kratzmann	(United States) Alex O'Brien (Australia) Sandon Stolle	7–6, 3–6, 2–6
Win	1995	Hamburg	Clay	(Russia) Yevgeny Kafelnikov	(Zimbabwe) Byron Black (Russia) Andrei Olhovskiy	6–1, 7–6
Loss	1999	Canada	Hard	(Zimbabwe) Byron Black	(Sweden) Jonas Björkman (Australia) Patrick Rafter	6–7, 4–6
Loss	2000	Rome	Clay	(Russia) Yevgeny Kafelnikov	(Czech Republic) Martin Damm (Slovakia) Dominik Hrbatý	4–6, 6–4, 3–6
Win	2000	Monte Carlo	Clay	(Russia) Yevgeny Kafelnikov	(Netherlands) Paul Haarhuis (Australia) Sandon Stolle	6–3, 2–6, 6–1
Win	2001	Indian Wells	Hard	(Russia) Yevgeny Kafelnikov	(Sweden) Jonas Björkman (Australia) Todd Woodbridge	6–2, 7–5
Win	2001	Rome	Clay	(Russia) Yevgeny Kafelnikov	(Canada) Daniel Nestor (Australia) Sandon Stolle	6–4, 7–6
Win	2003	Indian Wells	Hard	(Russia) Yevgeny Kafelnikov	(United States) Bob Bryan (United States) Mike Bryan	3–6, 7–5, 6–4

== Career finals ==
=== Singles: 23 (15 wins / 8 losses) ===
Finals by category Grand Slam (0–0) Tennis Masters Cup (0–0) ATP Masters Series (2–1) ATP Championship Series (1–4) ATP Tour (12–3)	Finals by surface Hard (11–4) Grass (1–2) Clay (1–1) Carpet (2–1)

Result	W/L	Date	Tournament	Surface	Opponent	Score
Loss	0–1	Feb 1992	Memphis, US	Hard (i)	(United States) MaliVai Washington	3–6, 2–6
Win	1–1	Jun 1992	Queen's Club, UK	Grass	(Japan) Shuzo Matsuoka	6–3, 6–4
Loss	1–2	Jul 1992	Stuttgart, Germany	Clay	(Ukraine) Andrei Medvedev	1–6, 4–6, 7–6^{(7–5)}, 6–2, 1–6
Win	2–2	Aug 1992	Schenectady, US	Hard	(Australia) Jamie Morgan	6–2, 6–7^{(5–7)}, 6–2
Loss	2–3	Mar 1993	Indian Wells, US	Hard	(United States) Jim Courier	3–6, 3–6, 1–6
Loss	2–4	Jun 1993	Queen's Club, UK	Grass	(Germany) Michael Stich	3–6, 4–6
Win	3–4	Jan 1994	Oahu, US	Hard	(United States) Richey Reneberg	6–4, 6–7^{(3–7)}, 6–1
Loss	3–5	Feb 1994	Rotterdam, Netherlands	Carpet	(Germany) Michael Stich	6–4, 3–6, 0–6
Loss	3–6	Jun 1994	Manchester, UK	Grass	(Australia) Patrick Rafter	6–7^{(5–7)}, 6–7^{(4–7)}
Win	4–6	Aug 1994	Indianapolis, US	Hard	(France) Olivier Delaître	6–2, 6–1
Win	5–6	Sep 1994	Bordeaux, France	Hard	(United States) Jeff Tarango	6–0, 7–5
Win	6–6	Oct 1994	Basel, Switzerland	Hard (i)	(United States) Patrick McEnroe	4–6, 6–2, 7–6^{(9–7)}, 6–3
Win	7–6	Oct 1994	Tel-Aviv, Israel	Hard	(Israel) Amos Mansdorf	7–6^{(7–4)}, 6–3
Win	8–6	Feb 1995	Dubai, UAE	Hard	(Italy) Andrea Gaudenzi	6–3, 6–3
Win	9–6	May 1995	Munich, Germany	Clay	(Germany) Michael Stich	7–5, 7–6^{(8–6)}
Win	10–6	Oct 1995	Ostrava, Czech Republic	Carpet	(United States) MaliVai Washington	3–6, 6–4, 6–3
Win	11–6	Oct 1995	Lyon, France	Carpet	(United States) Pete Sampras	7–6^{(7–2)}, 5–7, 6–3
Win	12–6	Mar 1996	Scottsdale, US	Hard	(Chile) Marcelo Ríos	2–6, 6–3, 6–3
Loss	12–7	Jul 1996	Washington, D.C., US	Hard	(United States) Michael Chang	2–6, 4–6
Win	13–7	Aug 1996	Toronto, Canada	Hard	(Australia) Todd Woodbridge	6–2, 6–4
Loss	13–8	Apr 1999	Tokyo, Japan	Hard	(Germany) Nicolas Kiefer	6–7^{(5–7)}, 5–7
Win	14–8	Nov 2000	Stuttgart, Germany	Hard (i)	(Australia) Lleyton Hewitt	7–6^{(8–6)}, 3–6, 6–7^{(5–7)}, 7–6^{(7–2)}, 6–2
Win	15–8	Aug 2003	Los Angeles, US	Hard	(Australia) Lleyton Hewitt	6–3, 4–6, 7–5

=== Singles performance timeline ===
Key
W	F	SF	QF	#R	RR	Q#	P#	DNQ	A	Z#	PO	G	S	B	NMS	NTI	P	NH

(W) winner; (F) finalist; (SF) semifinalist; (QF) quarterfinalist; (#R) rounds 4, 3, 2, 1; (RR) round-robin stage; (Q#) qualification round; (P#) preliminary round; (DNQ) did not qualify; (A) absent; (Z#) Davis/Fed Cup Zonal Group (with number indication) or (PO) play-off; (G) gold, (S) silver or (B) bronze Olympic/Paralympic medal; (NMS) not a Masters tournament; (NTI) not a Tier I tournament; (P) postponed; (NH) not held; (SR) strike rate (events won / competed); (W–L) win–loss record.

Tournament	1988	1989	1990	1991	1992	1993	1994	1995	1996	1997	1998	1999	2000	2001	2002	2003	2004	SR	W–L
Grand Slam tournaments
Australian Open	A	A	A	4R	SF	4R	4R	2R	2R	4R	2R	4R	4R	3R	QF	SF	3R	0 / 14	39–14
French Open	A	A	A	2R	3R	2R	1R	3R	4R	3R	3R	2R	3R	1R	1R	3R	1R	0 / 14	18–13
Wimbledon	A	Q1	2R	2R	4R	4R	QF	4R	3R	3R	4R	1R	4R	1R	3R	1R	3R	0 / 15	29–15
US Open	A	A	A	2R	QF	4R	3R	1R	1R	4R	1R	1R	2R	1R	4R	2R	1R	0 / 14	18–14
Win–loss	0–0	0–0	1–1	6–4	14–4	10–4	9–4	6–4	6–4	10–3	6–4	4–4	9–4	2–4	9–4	8–4	4–4	0 / 57	104–56
Year-end championships
Tennis Masters Cup	Did not qualify							RR	Did not qualify									0 / 1	2–1
Grand Slam Cup	NH		DNQ		1R	QF	1R	Did not qualify					Not Held					0 / 3	1–3
ATP Masters Series
Indian Wells	NME		A	3R	2R	F	2R	QF	QF	2R	2R	1R	2R	1R	1R	1R	2R	0 / 14	17–14
Miami	NME		A	4R	2R	2R	3R	QF	2R	3R	4R	2R	QF	2R	1R	3R	2R	0 / 14	16–14
Monte Carlo	NME		A	A	3R	A	2R	A	A	2R	2R	A	2R	1R	A	2R	A	0 / 7	6–7
Rome	NME		A	3R	2R	1R	3R	SF	SF	1R	2R	2R	1R	QF	3R	2R	A	0 / 13	21–13
Hamburg	NME		A	1R	2R	1R	A	QF	QF	3R	3R	3R	3R	1R	2R	QF	A	0 / 12	17–12
Canada	NME		A	A	A	3R	SF	3R	W	3R	1R	3R	SF	1R	1R	1R	A	1 / 11	19–10
Cincinnati	NME		A	3R	1R	3R	3R	3R	QF	2R	2R	1R	1R	1R	3R	1R	A	0 / 13	14–13
Stuttgart^{1}	NME		A	A	2R	2R	3R	2R	2R	A	2R	2R	W	QF	A	2R	A	1 / 10	13–9
Paris	NME		A	2R	2R	2R	2R	SF	3R	A	1R	1R	3R	1R	A	1R	A	0 / 11	5–11
Win–loss	N/A		0–0	9–6	5–8	9–8	11–8	17–8	18–7	5–7	9–9	6–8	19–8	6–9	5–6	7–9	2–2	2 / 105	128–103
Year-end ranking	315	229	173	41	12	22	12	9	10	42	26	54	13	62	39	26	128		

^{1}Held as Stockholm Masters until 1994, Essen Masters in 1995, Stuttgart Masters 1996–2001, Madrid Masters from 2002–08.

=== Doubles: 24 (11 wins / 13 losses) ===
Result	No.	Date	Tournament	Surface	Partner	Opponents	Score
Win	1.	Jan 1991	Adelaide, Australia	Hard	(South Africa) Stefan Kruger	(Netherlands) Paul Haarhuis (Netherlands) Mark Koevermans	6–4, 4–6, 6–4
Win	2.	Mar 1991	Miami, US	Hard	(South Africa) Piet Norval	(United States) Ken Flach (United States) Robert Seguso	5–7, 7–6, 6–2
Win	3.	Jan 1992	Auckland, New Zealand	Hard	(United States) Jim Grabb	(Canada) Grant Connell (Canada) Glenn Michibata	6–4, 6–3
Loss	1.	Apr 1992	Johannesburg, South Africa	Hard	(South Africa) Piet Norval	(South Africa) Pieter Aldrich (South Africa) Danie Visser	4–6, 4–6
Loss	2.	May 1992	Rome, Italy	Clay	(Australia) Mark Kratzmann	(Switzerland) Jakob Hlasek (Switzerland) Marc Rosset	4–6, 6–3, 1–6
Loss	3.	Aug 1992	Olympics, Barcelona, Spain	Clay	(South Africa) Piet Norval	(Germany) Boris Becker (Germany) Michael Stich	6–7, 6–4, 6–7, 3–6
Loss	4.	May 1993	Rome, Italy	Clay	(Australia) Mark Kratzmann	(Netherlands) Jacco Eltingh (Netherlands) Paul Haarhuis	4–6, 6–7
Win	4.	Aug 1993	Los Angeles, US	Hard	(Germany) Michael Stich	(Canada) Grant Connell (United States) Scott Davis	7–6, 7–6
Loss	5.	Nov 1993	Antwerp, Belgium	Carpet	(Spain) Javier Sánchez	(Canada) Grant Connell (United States) Patrick Galbraith	3–6, 6–7
Loss	6.	May 1994	Rome, Italy	Clay	(Spain) Javier Sánchez	(Russia) Yevgeny Kafelnikov (Czech Republic) David Rikl	1–6, 5–7
Loss	7.	Aug 1994	Cincinnati, US	Hard	(Australia) Mark Kratzmann	(United States) Alex O'Brien (Australia) Sandon Stolle	7–6, 3–6, 2–6
Win	5.	May 1995	Hamburg, Germany	Clay	(Russia) Yevgeny Kafelnikov	(Zimbabwe) Byron Black (Russia) Andrei Olhovskiy	6–1, 7–6
Loss	8.	Oct 1995	Lyon, France	Carpet	(South Africa) John-Laffnie de Jager	(Switzerland) Jakob Hlasek (Russia) Yevgeny Kafelnikov	3–6, 3–6
Win	6.	Feb 1998	Antwerp, Belgium	Hard	(Russia) Yevgeny Kafelnikov	(Spain) Tomás Carbonell (Spain) Francisco Roig	7–5, 3–6, 6–2
Loss	9.	Jul 1998	Washington, D.C., US	Hard	(United States) Patrick Galbraith	(South Africa) Grant Stafford (Zimbabwe) Kevin Ullyett	2–6, 4–6
Loss	10.	Mar 1999	London, UK	Carpet	(Zimbabwe) Byron Black	(United Kingdom) Tim Henman (United Kingdom) Greg Rusedski	3–6, 6–7
Win	7.	Aug 1999	Los Angeles, US	Hard	(Zimbabwe) Byron Black	(Croatia) Goran Ivanišević (United States) Brian MacPhie	6–2, 7–6
Loss	11.	Aug 1999	Montreal, Canada	Hard	(Zimbabwe) Byron Black	(Sweden) Jonas Björkman (Australia) Patrick Rafter	6–7, 4–6
Loss	12.	Oct 1999	Lyon, France	Carpet	(Australia) Sandon Stolle	(South Africa) Piet Norval (Zimbabwe) Kevin Ullyett	6–4, 6–7, 6–7
Win	8.	Apr 2000	Monte Carlo, Monaco	Clay	(Russia) Yevgeny Kafelnikov	(Netherlands) Paul Haarhuis (Australia) Sandon Stolle	6–3, 2–6, 6–1
Loss	13.	May 2000	Rome, Italy	Clay	(Russia) Yevgeny Kafelnikov	(Czech Republic) Martin Damm (Slovakia) Dominik Hrbatý	4–6, 6–4, 3–6
Win	9.	Mar 2001	Indian Wells, US	Hard	(Russia) Yevgeny Kafelnikov	(Sweden) Jonas Björkman (Australia) Todd Woodbridge	6–2, 7–5
Win	10.	May 2001	Rome, Italy	Clay	(Russia) Yevgeny Kafelnikov	(Canada) Daniel Nestor (Australia) Sandon Stolle	6–4, 7–6
Win	11.	Mar 2003	Indian Wells, US	Hard	(Russia) Yevgeny Kafelnikov	(United States) Bob Bryan (United States) Mike Bryan	3–6, 7–5, 6–4

== Doubles performance timeline ==
Tournament	1988	1989	1990	1991	1992	1993	1994	1995	1996	1997	1998	1999	2000	2001	2002	2003	2004	SR	W–L
Grand Slam tournaments
Australian Open	A	A	A	1R	2R	3R	1R	A	3R	A	A	2R	3R	3R	2R	A	2R	0 / 10	12–10
French Open	A	A	A	A	3R	2R	A	A	A	1R	A	2R	QF	1R	2R	A	A	0 / 7	8–7
Wimbledon	A	A	3R	SF	1R	3R	SF	A	A	A	A	1R	2R	3R	2R	A	A	0 / 9	16–8
US Open	A	A	3R	2R	3R	3R	SF	A	A	QF	1R	A	SF	2R	3R	A	A	0 / 10	21–9
Win–loss	0–0	0–0	4–2	5–2	5–4	7–4	8–3	0–0	2–1	3–2	0–1	2–3	10–4	5–3	5–4	0–0	1–1	0 / 36	57–34
ATP Masters Series
Indian Wells	NME		A	1R	QF	2R	2R	1R	2R	2R	1R	2R	SF	W	1R	W	A	2 / 13	20–11
Miami	NME		A	W	SF	2R	2R	A	A	QF	QF	1R	2R	A	1R	A	A	1 / 9	16–8
Monte Carlo	NME		A	A	QF	A	1R	A	A	Q2	2R	A	W	1R	A	A	A	1 / 5	7–4
Rome	NME		A	1R	F	F	F	A	QF	A	1R	QF	F	W	2R	QF	A	1 / 11	28–10
Hamburg	NME		A	1R	A	1R	A	W	1R	2R	1R	1R	2R	1R	SF	A	A	1 / 10	9–9
Canada	NME		A	A	A	1R	1R	1R	A	A	A	F	2R	1R	QF	A	A	0 / 7	7–7
Cincinnati	NME		A	QF	1R	2R	F	QF	A	1R	A	A	2R	2R	2R	A	A	0 / 9	12–7
Madrid (Stuttgart)	NME		A	2R	2R	1R	A	QF	A	A	A	2R	QF	QF	A	A	A	0 / 7	7–6
Paris	NME		A	1R	QF	Q1	A	A	A	A	Q1	QF	2R	A	A	A	A	0 / 4	4–4
Win–loss	N/A		0–0	8–6	13–7	6–7	10–6	8–3	3–3	5–4	4–5	10–7	16–8	13–4	7–5	7–1	0–0	6 / 75	110–66
Year-end ranking	511	357	87	25	31	35	19	59	100	114	66	31	14	31	56	85	495		

== Senior Tour championships ==
- 2007– defeated Jim Courier 2–6, 6–3, [11–9] in the Stanford Championships
- 2007– defeated Aaron Krickstein 6–3, 6–3 in The Oliver Group Champions Cup

== Top 10 wins ==
Season	1990	1991	1992	1993	1994	1995	1996	1997	1998	1999	2000	2001	2002	2003	2004	2005	Total
Wins	0	2	3	0	1	7	2	1	5	1	3	1	3	3	0	0	32

#	Player	Rank	Event	Surface	Rd	Score	FR
1991
1.	(Ecuador) Andrés Gómez	10	Indian Wells, United States	Hard	2R	6–4, 7–6^{(7–5)}	121
2.	(United States) Ivan Lendl	4	Sydney, Australia	Hard (i)	3R	6–4, 2–6, 7–5	64
1992
3.	(Czechoslovakia) Karel Nováček	10	Australian Open, Melbourne, Australia	Hard	2R	3–6, 6–3, 7–6^{(8–6)}, 7–6^{(9–7)}	46
4.	(United States) Pete Sampras	4	Memphis, United States	Hard (i)	QF	6–4, 6–2	26
5.	(Croatia) Goran Ivanišević	4	Stuttgart, Germany	Clay	QF	6–3, 6–7^{(7–9)}, 6–4	16
1994
6.	(Croatia) Goran Ivanišević	6	Rotterdam, Netherlands	Carpet (i)	SF	6–2, 3–6, 7–5	17
1995
7.	(Germany) Michael Stich	8	Munich, Germany	Clay	F	7–5, 7–6^{(8–6)}	12
8.	(Germany) Michael Stich	8	Hamburg, Germany	Clay	3R	7–5, 6–1	6
9.	(Russia) Yevgeny Kafelnikov	6	Lyon, France	Carpet (i)	SF	1–6, 7–6^{(7–3)}, 6–3	13
10.	(United States) Pete Sampras	2	Lyon, France	Carpet (i)	F	7–6^{(7–2)}, 5–7, 6–3	13
11.	(Spain) Sergi Bruguera	10	Paris, France	Carpet (i)	3R	6–2, 3–6, 7–6^{(7–3)}	11
12.	(Russia) Yevgeny Kafelnikov	6	ATP Tour World Championships, Frankfurt, Germany	Carpet (i)	RR	3–6, 7–6^{(7–5)}, 6–1	9
13.	(United States) Pete Sampras	1	ATP Tour World Championships, Frankfurt, Germany	Carpet (i)	RR	7–6^{(7–1)}, 4–6, 6–3	9
1996
14.	(United States) Jim Courier	8	Indian Wells, United States	Hard	3R	6–4, 6–4	10
15.	(United States) Jim Courier	9	Cincinnati, United States	Hard	3R	7–6^{(11–9)}, 6–7^{(4–7)}, 6–2	10
1997
16.	(Sweden) Thomas Enqvist	7	Davis Cup, Växjö, Sweden	Carpet (i)	RR	6–4, 6–4, 6–4	10
1998
17.	(Australia) Patrick Rafter	3	London, United Kingdom	Carpet (i)	QF	6–4, 6–4	47
18.	(United States) Pete Sampras	1	Miami, United States	Hard	3R	0–6, 7–6^{(8–6)}, 6–3	36
19.	(Chile) Marcelo Ríos	3	Hamburg, Germany	Clay	2R	4–6, 6–4, 6–3	32
20.	(United States) Pete Sampras	1	Basel, Switzerland	Hard (i)	1R	4–6, 7–6^{(7–4)}, 6–3	35
21.	(Australia) Patrick Rafter	3	Lyon, France	Carpet (i)	QF	6–4, 6–1	29
1999
22.	(Netherlands) Richard Krajicek	9	Australian Open, Melbourne, Australia	Hard	3R	6–7^{(1–7)}, 6–7^{(5–7)}, 6–4, 6–2, 6–3	26
2000
23.	(Russia) Yevgeny Kafelnikov	5	Toronto, Canada	Hard	QF	6–3, 7–6^{(7–1)}	31
24.	(Sweden) Thomas Enqvist	7	Stuttgart, Germany	Hard (i)	2R	6–2, 7–5	19
25.	(Australia) Lleyton Hewitt	8	Stuttgart, Germany	Hard (i)	F	7–6^{(8–6)}, 3–6, 6–7^{(5–7)}, 7–6^{(7–2)}, 6–2	19
2001
26.	(France) Sébastien Grosjean	8	Stuttgart, Germany	Hard (i)	3R	6–3, 3–6, 7–6^{(9–7)}	36
2002
27.	(Russia) Yevgeny Kafelnikov	4	Rome, Italy	Clay	2R	6–4, 4–6, 6–2	44
28.	(Spain) Albert Costa	7	Cincinnati, United States	Hard	2R	7–6^{(8–6)}, 6–2	44
29.	(Spain) Albert Costa	8	US Open, New York, United States	Hard	2R	1–6, 6–7^{(10–12)}, 6–4, 7–5, 6–4	39
2003
30.	(Spain) Juan Carlos Ferrero	4	Australian Open, Melbourne, Australia	Hard	QF	7–6^{(7–4)}, 7–6^{(7–5)}, 6–1	39
31.	(France) Sébastien Grosjean	9	Los Angeles, United States	Hard	QF	7–6^{(7–4)}, 6–7^{(4–7)}, 6–2	25
32.	(Australia) Lleyton Hewitt	5	Los Angeles, United States	Hard	F	6–3, 4–6, 7–5	25
