= Jim Courier =

American tennis player (born 1970)

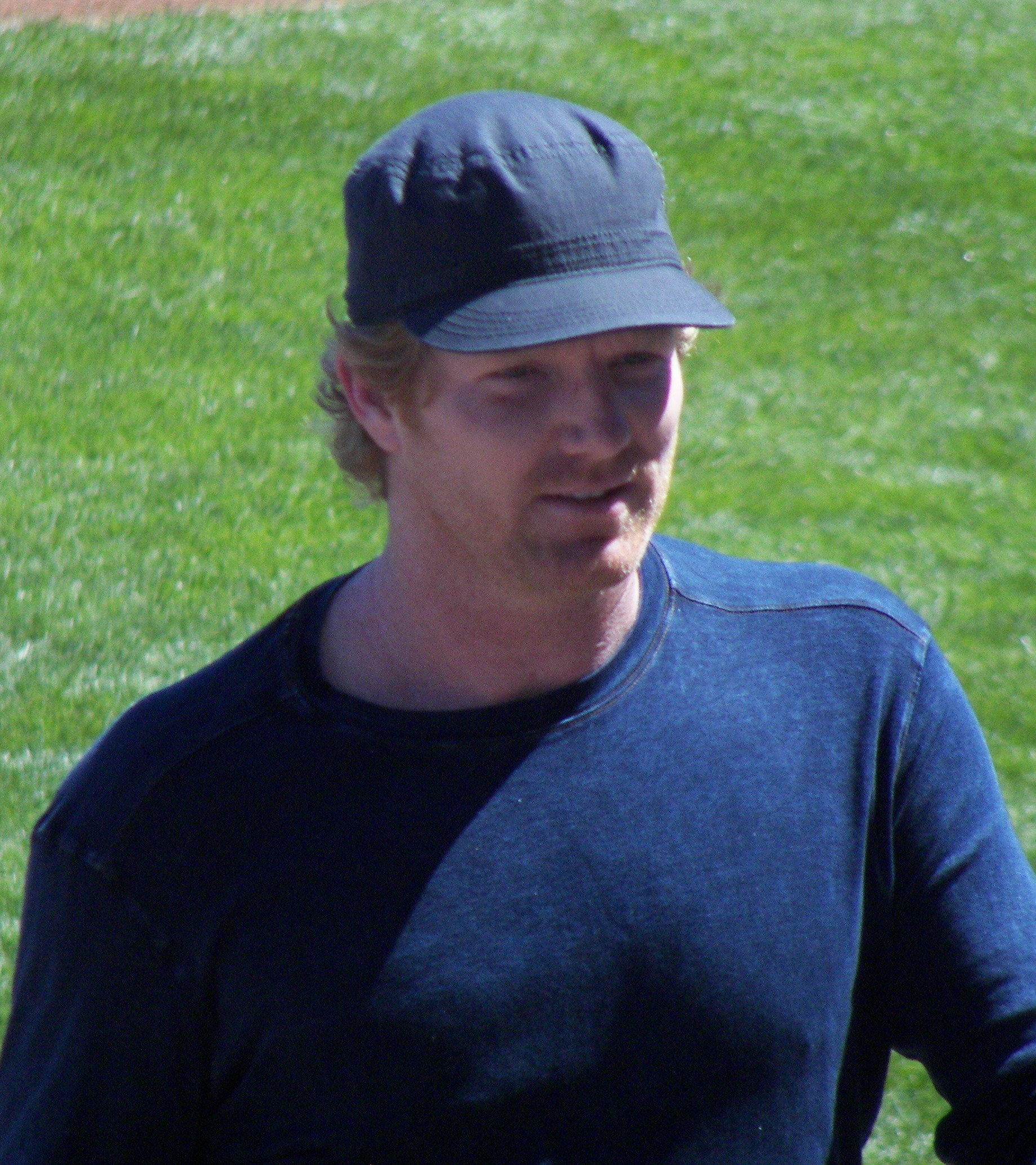
- Courier in 2007
- Country (sports): United States
- Residence: Orlando, Florida, US
- Born: August 17, 1970 (age 56) Sanford, Florida, US
- Height: 6 ft 1 in (1.85 m)
- Turned pro: 1988
- Retired: 2000
- Plays: Right-handed (two-handed backhand)
- Coach: Nick Bollettieri; Sergio Cruz (1988–1990); Brad Stine (1990–1994); José Higueras (1990–1997); Harold Solomon (1997); Brad Stine (1997–2000)
- Prize money: US$14,034,132
- Int. Tennis HoF: 2005 (member page)

Singles
- Career record: 506–237 (68.1%)
- Career titles: 23
- Highest ranking: No. 1 (February 10, 1992)

Grand Slam singles results
- Australian Open: W (1992, 1993)
- French Open: W (1991, 1992)
- Wimbledon: F (1993)
- US Open: F (1991)

Other tournaments
- Tour Finals: F (1991, 1992)
- Grand Slam Cup: QF (1996)
- Olympic Games: 3R (1992)

Doubles
- Career record: 124–97 (56.1%)
- Career titles: 6
- Highest ranking: No. 20 (October 9, 1989)

Grand Slam doubles results
- Australian Open: 1R (1990)
- French Open: 2R (1989)
- Wimbledon: 3R (1989, 1991)
- US Open: 1R (1989, 1990)

Team competitions
- Davis Cup: W (1992, 1995)

James Spencer Courier (born August 17, 1970) is an American former professional tennis player. He was ranked as the world No. 1 in men's singles by the Association of Tennis Professionals (ATP) for 58 weeks, including as the year-end No. 1 in 1992. Courier won 23 ATP Tour-level singles titles, including four majors – two at the French Open and two at the Australian Open – and was the youngest man in the Open Era to reach the final of all four singles majors, after reaching the final of the 1993 Wimbledon Championships aged 22 years, 319 days, a record that stood until Carlos Alcaraz achieved the same feat aged 22 years, 270 days at the 2026 Australian Open, just 49 days younger than Courier. He also won five Masters titles and was part of the victorious United States Davis Cup teams in 1992 and 1995.

Since 2005, Courier has worked as a tennis commentator, notably for Nine (and previously Seven), the host broadcaster of the Australian Open. He is also an analyst for Tennis Channel and Prime Video Sport.

== Tennis career ==
Courier was raised in Dade City, Florida, and though he excelled at youth sports in general, after a certain point it became clear that tennis was where his true talent lay. As a junior player in the 1980s, Courier attended the Nick Bollettieri Tennis Academy and won the prestigious Orange Bowl in 1986 and 1987 (the first to win back-to-back titles since Ivan Lendl), as well as the French Open junior doubles title in 1987.

Courier turned professional in 1988 and made his Grand Slam breakthrough at the 1991 French Open when he defeated Stefan Edberg and Michael Stich to reach his first Grand Slam final. In the final he defeated his former Bollettieri Academy roommate Andre Agassi in five sets to win his first Slam. "I didn't want to give him any easy points, and with that kind of wind anything could happen and anything did" Courier said afterwards. He made the quarterfinals of Wimbledon before losing to eventual champion Stich. At the US Open he defeated defending champion Pete Sampras in the quarterfinals and then Jimmy Connors in the semifinals, before losing the final to Edberg.

1992 saw Courier defeat Edberg in the final in four sets to win the Australian Open, and he celebrated by jumping into the nearby Yarra River. He then followed this result by defeating future Grand Slam champions Thomas Muster, Goran Ivanišević, Agassi and Petr Korda in the final in straight sets to successfully defend his French Open title. Afterward, Courier charmed the Parisian crowd by delivering a victory speech in French. Courier also enjoyed a 25-match winning streak during the season. In February of that year, following the San Francisco tournament, he became the tenth player to reach the world no. 1 ranking since the ranking system was implemented in 1973, and the first American since John McEnroe; he finished 1992 as the world no. 1 ranked player. Courier also was a member of the US team that won the 1992 Davis Cup. In 1992 he was the top-seeded player at the Olympics in Barcelona, where he lost in the third round to eventual gold medalist Marc Rosset from Switzerland.

In 1993, Courier again won the Australian Open, defeating Edberg in the final in four sets for the second consecutive year, and jumped into the Yarra a second time, but it was to be his last such celebration after contracting a stomach bug from the muddy and polluted river. He reached his third consecutive French Open final, which he lost to Sergi Bruguera in five sets. He also reached the 1993 Wimbledon final, defeating Edberg in the semifinals (Courier "used his attacking baseline game to keep Edberg off balance") and lost to Sampras in four sets. By reaching the Wimbledon final, Courier had reached the finals of all four Grand Slams at the age of 22 years and 319 days, a record which stood in men's singles for 33 years until Carlos Alcaraz reached the 2026 Australian Open final at 22 years and 266 days. Courier also became the first player since Rod Laver to reach the finals of the Australian, French and Wimbledon in the same season; the feat was not matched until 2006 by Roger Federer. Courier again was part of the US team that won the 1995 Davis Cup.

Courier captured a total of 23 singles titles and 6 doubles titles during his career. He spent a total of 58 weeks ranked as the World No. 1 in 1992 and 1993. He reached the finals of all four major championships during his career, a feat accomplished by only seven other male players in the Open Era. Courier retired from the ATP tour in 2000. He was inducted into the International Tennis Hall of Fame in 2005.

Courier returned to the tour at the 2005 U.S. Men's Clay Court Championships when he received a wildcard into the doubles draw partnering Andre Agassi. The pair lost in the first round to eventual finalists Martín García and Luis Horna in three sets. It would be the last match of Courier's career.

== After retirement from top-level tennis ==
Since his retirement as a top-level player, Courier has served as a tennis analyst and commentator for the Tennis Channel, USA Network, NBC Sports, TNT, ITV, Sky Sports and the Seven and Nine Networks. Since 2005, Courier has headed the commentary for the domestic host broadcaster of the Australian Open, which was Seven from 2005 to 2018 and Nine since 2019. Courier calls many centre court men's singles matches for the network and often conducts the post-match on-court interviews with the winning player. He also provided special comments on the Seven Network's Wimbledon coverage between 2013 and 2019. Courier started working with the British channel ITV for the French Open in 2012. In 2015, Courier worked with the British channel Sky Sports for their US Open coverage. The Jim Courier Club House now stands on the grounds of the Dade City Little League complex in John S. Burks Memorial Park in Dade City, Florida. Courier is an alumnus of that Little League program.

In 2004, Courier founded InsideOut Sport & Entertainment, a New York-based event production company that owns and operates the Champions Series, Legendary Nights exhibitions as well as private corporate events.

He also founded Courier's Kids, a non-profit organization that supports tennis programs in the inner city of St. Petersburg, Florida.

Courier competed on the Champions Series until it ended, and in various charity exhibition matches.

Courier married Susanna Lingman in 2010.

On October 27, 2010, Courier was named captain of the United States Davis Cup team, replacing Patrick McEnroe. Courier stepped down from the role after the 2018 semi-final defeat to Croatia. Courier led his country with a 10–8 record and two semi-final appearances during his captaincy.

In August 2019, Courier was working for Prime Video UK, for their exclusive coverage of the US Open.

In 2022, he co-presented popular Australian reality show Ninja Warrior for the Nine Network, whom he also works for on their Australian Open coverage each local summer.

== Singles performance timeline ==
Key
W	F	SF	QF	#R	RR	Q#	DNQ	A	NH

(W) winner; (F) finalist; (SF) semifinalist; (QF) quarterfinalist; (#R) rounds 4, 3, 2, 1; (RR) round-robin stage; (Q#) qualification round; (DNQ) did not qualify; (A) absent; (NH) not held; (SR) strike rate (events won / competed); (W–L) win–loss record.

Tournament	1987	1988	1989	1990	1991	1992	1993	1994	1995	1996	1997	1998	1999	2000	SR	W–L
Grand Slam tournaments
Australian Open	A	A	A	2R	4R	W	W	SF	QF	QF	4R	A	3R	1R	2 / 10	35–8
French Open	A	A	4R	4R	W	W	F	SF	4R	QF	1R	2R	2R	A	2 / 11	40–9
Wimbledon	A	A	1R	3R	QF	3R	F	2R	2R	1R	1R	1R	4R	A	0 / 11	19–11
US Open	A	2R	3R	2R	F	SF	4R	2R	SF	A	1R	A	1R	A	0 / 10	24–10
Win–loss	0–0	1–1	5–3	7–4	20–3	20–2	22–3	12–4	13–4	8–3	3–4	1–2	6–4	0–1	4 / 42	118–38
Year-end championships
ATP Championships	A	A	A	A	F	F	RR	A	RR	A	A	A	A	A	0 / 4	7–9
Grand Slam Cup	Not Held			A	1R	A	A	A	A	QF	A	A	A	NH	0 / 2	1–2
Grand Prix				ATP Masters Series												
Indian Wells	A	A	1R	SF	W	3R	W	2R	2R	3R	1R	3R	2R	1R	2 / 12	21–10
Miami	A	2R	3R	QF	W	SF	4R	SF	3R	QF	SF	2R	2R	2R	1 / 13	33–12
Monte Carlo	A	A	A	3R	A	A	A	QF	A	2R	2R	A	A	A	0 / 4	6–4
Hamburg	A	A	A	3R	2R	A	A	A	A	A	A	A	A	A	0 / 2	2–2
Rome	A	A	3R	3R	3R	W	W	QF	1R	2R	QF	1R	A	A	2 / 10	25–8
Canada	A	A	A	A	SF	A	3R	SF	3R	A	1R	1R	QF	A	0 / 7	12–7
Cincinnati	A	1R	3R	QF	SF	3R	2R	QF	QF	3R	1R	1R	2R	A	0 / 11	16–12
Stockholm	A	SF	QF	2R	SF	3R	3R	3R	ATP World Series						0 / 7	13–7
Stuttgart Indoor	NH	Exho.		ATP Championship Series					QF	3R	A	A	2R	A	0 / 3	4–3
Paris	A	A	A	3R	3R	QF	2R	2R	SF	2R	1R	A	QF	A	0 / 9	11–9
Win–loss	–	5–3	8–5	19–8	24–6	15–5	15–5	16–8	12–7	7–7	8–7	3–5	10–6	1–2	5 / 71	130–66
Year-end ranking	346	43	24	25	2	1	3	13	8	26	21	77	32	290		

=== Singles finals: 7 (4 titles, 3 runner-ups) ===
Result	Year	Championship	Surface	Opponent	Score
Win	1991	French Open	Clay	(United States) Andre Agassi	3–6, 6–4, 2–6, 6–1, 6–4
Loss	1991	US Open	Hard	(Sweden) Stefan Edberg	2–6, 4–6, 0–6
Win	1992	Australian Open	Hard	(Sweden) Stefan Edberg	6–3, 3–6, 6–4, 6–2
Win	1992	French Open (2)	Clay	(Czech Republic) Petr Korda	7–5, 6–2, 6–1
Win	1993	Australian Open (2)	Hard	(Sweden) Stefan Edberg	6–2, 6–1, 2–6, 7–5
Loss	1993	French Open	Clay	(Spain) Sergi Bruguera	4–6, 6–2, 2–6, 6–3, 3–6
Loss	1993	Wimbledon	Grass	(United States) Pete Sampras	6–7^{(3–7)}, 6–7^{(6–8)}, 6–3, 3–6

=== Singles finals: 2 (2 runner-ups) ===
Result	Year	Location	Surface	Opponent	Score
Loss	1991	Frankfurt	Hard (i)	(United States) Pete Sampras	6–3, 6–7^{(5–7)}, 3–6, 4–6
Loss	1992	Frankfurt	Hard (i)	(Germany) Boris Becker	4–6, 3–6, 5–7

=== Singles finals: 5 (5 titles) ===
Result	Year	Tournament	Surface	Opponent	Score
Win	1991	Indian Wells	Hard	(France) Guy Forget	4–6, 6–3, 4–6, 6–3, 7–6^{(7–4)}
Win	1991	Miami	Hard	(United States) David Wheaton	4–6, 6–3, 6–4
Win	1992	Rome	Clay	(Spain) Carlos Costa	7–6^{(7–3)}, 6–0, 6–4
Win	1993	Indian Wells (2)	Hard	(South Africa) Wayne Ferreira	6–3, 6–3, 6–1
Win	1993	Rome (2)	Clay	(Croatia) Goran Ivanišević	6–1, 6–2, 6–2

=== Doubles finals: 5 (4 titles, 1 runner up) ===
Result	Year	Tournament	Surface	Partner	Opponents	Score
Win	1989	Rome	Clay	(United States) Pete Sampras	(Brazil) Danilo Marcelino (Brazil) Mauro Menezes	6–4, 6–3
Win	1990	Hamburg	Clay	(Spain) Sergi Bruguera	(West Germany) Udo Riglewski (West Germany) Michael Stich	7–6, 6–2
Loss	1990	Rome	Clay	(United States) Martin Davis	(Spain) Sergio Casal (Spain) Emilio Sánchez	6–7, 5–7
Win	1991	Indian Wells	Hard	(Spain) Javier Sánchez	(France) Guy Forget (France) Henri Leconte	7–6, 3–6, 6–3
Win	1993	Montreal	Hard	(The Bahamas) Mark Knowles	(Canada) Glenn Michibata (United States) David Pate	6–4, 7–6

=== Records ===
- These records were attained in Open Era of tennis.

Championship	Years	Record accomplished	Player tied
French Open—Australian Open	1991–1993	Simultaneous holder of consecutive Australian and French Open titles	Stands alone
Grand Slam	1992	Winner of Australian Open and French Open in the same calendar year	Rod Laver; Mats Wilander; Novak Djokovic; Rafael Nadal

== ATP career finals ==
=== Singles: 36 (23 titles / 13 runner-ups) ===
Legend Grand Slam (4–3) Year-end championships (0–2) ATP Masters Series (5–0) ATP Championship Series (5–3) ATP World Series (9–5)	Titles by surface Hard (17–6) Grass (0–1) Clay (5–2) Carpet (1–4)

Result	W–L	Date	Tournament	Surface	Opponent	Score
Win	1–0	Oct 1989	Basel, Switzerland	Hard (i)	(Sweden) Stefan Edberg	7–6^{(8–6)}, 3–6, 2–6, 6–0, 7–5
Win	2–0	Mar 1991	Indian Wells, US	Hard	(France) Guy Forget	4–6, 6–3, 4–6, 6–3, 7–6^{(7–4)}
Win	3–0	Mar 1991	Key Biscayne, US	Hard	(United States) David Wheaton	4–6, 6–3, 6–4
Win	4–0	Jun 1991	French Open, Paris, France	Clay	(United States) Andre Agassi	3–6, 6–4, 2–6, 6–1, 6–4
Loss	4–1	Sep 1991	US Open, New York City, US	Hard	(Sweden) Stefan Edberg	2–6, 4–6, 0–6
Loss	4–2	Nov 1991	ATP Championships, Frankfurt, Germany	Carpet (i)	(United States) Pete Sampras	6–3, 6–7^{(5–7)}, 3–6, 4–6
Win	5–2	Jan 1992	Australian Open, Melbourne, Australia	Hard	(Sweden) Stefan Edberg	6–3, 3–6, 6–4, 6–2
Loss	5–3	Feb 1992	San Francisco, US	Hard (i)	(United States) Michael Chang	3–6, 3–6
Loss	5–4	Feb 1992	Brussels, Belgium	Carpet (i)	(Germany) Boris Becker	7–6^{(7–5)}, 6–2, 6–7^{(10–12)}, 6–7^{(5–7)}, 5–7
Win	6–4	Apr 1992	Tokyo, Japan	Hard	(Netherlands) Richard Krajicek	6–4, 6–4, 7–6^{(7–3)}
Win	7–4	Apr 1992	Hong Kong, UK	Hard	(United States) Michael Chang	7–5, 6–3
Win	8–4	May 1992	Rome, Italy	Clay	(Spain) Carlos Costa	7–6^{(7–3)}, 6–0, 6–4
Win	9–4	Jun 1992	French Open, Paris, France	Clay	(Czech Republic) Petr Korda	7–5, 6–2, 6–1
Loss	9–5	Aug 1992	Indianapolis, US	Hard	(United States) Pete Sampras	4–6, 4–6
Loss	9–6	Nov 1992	ATP Championships, Frankfurt, Germany	Carpet (i)	(Germany) Boris Becker	4–6, 3–6, 5–7
Win	10–6	Feb 1993	Australian Open, Melbourne, Australia	Hard	(Sweden) Stefan Edberg	6–2, 6–1, 2–6, 7–5
Win	11–6	Feb 1993	Memphis, US	Hard (i)	(United States) Todd Martin	5–7, 7–6^{(7–4)}, 7–6^{(7–4)}
Win	12–6	Mar 1993	Indian Wells, US	Hard	(South Africa) Wayne Ferreira	6–3, 6–3, 6–1
Loss	12–7	Apr 1993	Hong Kong, UK	Hard	(United States) Pete Sampras	3–6, 7–6^{(7–1)}, 6–7^{(2–7)}
Win	13–7	May 1993	Rome, Italy	Clay	(Croatia) Goran Ivanišević	6–1, 6–2, 6–2
Loss	13–8	Jun 1993	French Open, Paris, France	Clay	(Spain) Sergi Bruguera	4–6, 6–2, 2–6, 6–3, 3–6
Loss	13–9	Jul 1993	Wimbledon, London, UK	Grass	(United States) Pete Sampras	6–7^{(3–7)}, 6–7^{(6–8)}, 6–3, 3–6
Win	14–9	Aug 1993	Indianapolis, US	Hard	(Germany) Boris Becker	7–5, 6–3
Loss	14–10	Apr 1994	Nice, France	Clay	(Spain) Alberto Berasategui	4–6, 2–6
Loss	14–11	Oct 1994	Lyon, France	Carpet (i)	(Switzerland) Marc Rosset	4–6, 6–7^{(2–7)}
Win	15–11	Jan 1995	Adelaide, Australia	Hard	(France) Arnaud Boetsch	6–2, 7–5
Win	16–11	Mar 1995	Scottsdale, US	Hard	(Australia) Mark Philippoussis	7–6^{(7–2)}, 6–4
Win	17–11	Apr 1995	Tokyo, Japan	Hard	(United States) Andre Agassi	6–3, 6–4
Win	18–11	Oct 1995	Basel, Switzerland	Hard (i)	(Netherlands) Jan Siemerink	6–7^{(2–7)}, 7–6^{(7–5)}, 5–7, 6–2, 7–5
Loss	18–12	Oct 1995	Toulouse, France	Hard (i)	(France) Arnaud Boetsch	4–6, 7–6^{(7–5)}, 0–6
Win	19–12	Mar 1996	Philadelphia, US	Carpet (i)	(United States) Chris Woodruff	6–4, 6–3
Win	20–12	Jan 1997	Doha, Qatar	Hard	(United Kingdom) Tim Henman	7–5, 6–7^{(5–7)}, 6–2
Win	21–12	Jul 1997	Los Angeles, US	Hard	(Sweden) Thomas Enqvist	6–4, 6–4
Win	22–12	Oct 1997	Beijing, China	Hard (i)	(Sweden) Magnus Gustafsson	7–6^{(12–10)}, 3–6, 6–3
Win	23–12	Apr 1998	Orlando, US	Clay	(United States) Michael Chang	7–5, 3–6, 7–5
Loss	23–13	Feb 1999	Memphis, US	Hard (i)	(Germany) Tommy Haas	4–6, 1–6

=== Doubles: 11 (6 titles / 5 runners-up) ===
Legend Grand Slam (0–0) Year-end championships (0–0) ATP Masters Series (4–1) ATP Championship Series (0–1) ATP World Series (2–3)	Titles by surface Hard (3–2) Grass (0–0) Clay (3–3) Carpet (0–0)

Result	W–L	Date	Tournament	Surface	Partner	Opponents	Score
Loss	0–1	May 1989	Forest Hills, US	Clay	(United States) Pete Sampras	(United States) Rick Leach (United States) Jim Pugh	4–6, 2–6
Win	1–1	May 1989	Rome, Italy	Clay	(United States) Pete Sampras	(Brazil) Danilo Marcelino (Brazil) Mauro Menezes	6–4, 6–3
Win	2–1	May 1990	Hamburg, West Germany	Clay	(Spain) Sergi Bruguera	(West Germany) Udo Riglewski (West Germany) Michael Stich	7–6, 6–2
Loss	2–2	May 1990	Rome, Italy	Clay	(United States) Martin Davis	(Spain) Sergio Casal (Spain) Emilio Sánchez	6–7, 5–7
Win	3–2	Mar 1991	Indian Wells, US	Hard	(Spain) Javier Sánchez	(France) Guy Forget (France) Henri Leconte	7–6, 3–6, 6–3
Win	4–2	Aug 1993	Montreal, Canada	Hard	(The Bahamas) Mark Knowles	(Canada) Glenn Michibata (United States) David Pate	6–4, 7–6
Loss	4–3	Apr 1994	Barcelona, Spain	Clay	(Spain) Javier Sánchez	(Russia) Yevgeny Kafelnikov (Czech Republic) David Rikl	7–5, 1–6, 4–6
Win	5–3	Jan 1995	Adelaide, Australia	Hard	(Australia) Patrick Rafter	(Zimbabwe) Byron Black (Canada) Grant Connell	7–6, 6–4
Loss	5–4	Oct 1997	Beijing, China	Hard (i)	(United States) Alex O'Brien	(India) Mahesh Bhupathi (India) Leander Paes	5–7, 6–7
Loss	5–5	Jan 1999	Adelaide, Australia	Hard	(United States) Patrick Galbraith	(Brazil) Gustavo Kuerten (Ecuador) Nicolás Lapentti	4–6, 4–6
Win	6–5	Apr 1999	Orlando, US	Clay	(Australia) Todd Woodbridge	(United States) Bob Bryan (United States) Mike Bryan	7–6^{(7–4)}, 6–4

== Professional awards ==
- ITF World Champion: 1992.
- ATP Player of the Year: 1992.

== Head-to-head ==
Courier has the following head-to-head records against the listed opponents (No. 1 ranked players in boldface):

- Michael Chang (12–12)
- Wayne Ferreira (9–2)
- Goran Ivanišević (8–3)
- Guy Forget (7–1)
- Richard Krajicek (7–1)
- Marc Rosset (7–4)
- **Andre Agassi** (7–5)
- **Thomas Muster** (7–5)
- Todd Martin (6–1)
- Thomas Enqvist (6–2)
- **Stefan Edberg** (6–4)
- Sergi Bruguera (5–2)
- Cédric Pioline (5–4)
- Michael Stich (5–7)
- Greg Rusedski (4–0)
- Andrei Chesnokov (4–6)
- **Pete Sampras** (4–16)
- **Jimmy Connors** (3–0)
- Tim Henman (3–1)
- Petr Korda (3–1)
- Karol Kučera (3–1)
- Sjeng Schalken (3–1)
- David Wheaton (3–3)
- Carlos Costa (2–1)
- Andrés Gómez (2–1)
- **John McEnroe** (2–1)
- **Carlos Moyá** (2–1)
- Andrei Cherkasov (2–2)
- Albert Costa (2–2)
- Brad Gilbert (2–2)
- Magnus Larsson (2–2)
- Andrei Medvedev (2–2)
- Jonathan Stark (2–2)
- **Gustavo Kuerten** (1–0)
- David Nalbandian (1–0)
- **Marat Safin** (1–1)
- Andrei Olhovskiy (1–1)
- Slava Doseděl (1–4)
- **Yevgeny Kafelnikov** (1–5)
- **Boris Becker** (1–6)
- Alberto Berasategui (0–2)
- **Patrick Rafter** (0–3)
- **Marcelo Ríos** (0–3)
- Àlex Corretja (0–4)
- **Ivan Lendl** (0–4)

=== Top 10 wins ===
Season	1987	1988	1989	1990	1991	1992	1993	1994	1995	1996	1997	1998	1999	2000	**Total**
Wins	0	0	3	1	10	10	8	3	6	0	7	1	4	0	**53**

#	Player	Rank	Event	Surface	Rd	Score	Courier Rank
1989
1.	(United States) Andre Agassi	5	French Open, Paris, France	Clay	3R	7–6, 4–6, 6–3, 6–2	47
2.	(Sweden) Stefan Edberg	3	Basel, Switzerland	Hard (i)	F	7–6, 3–6, 2–6, 6–0, 7–5	35
3.	(United States) Aaron Krickstein	8	Stockholm, Sweden	Carpet (i)	3R	6–2, 1–0, ret.	28
1990
4.	(United States) Aaron Krickstein	6	Indian Wells, United States	Hard	QF	6–2, 7–6	22
1991
5.	(United States) Andre Agassi	4	Indian Wells, United States	Hard	3R	2–6, 6–3, 6–4	26
6.	(Spain) Emilio Sánchez	8	Indian Wells, United States	Hard	QF	6–2, 6–2	26
7.	(France) Guy Forget	5	Indian Wells, United States	Hard	F	4–6, 6–3, 4–6, 6–3, 7–6^{(7–4)}	26
8.	(France) Guy Forget	5	Miami, United States	Hard	4R	7–6^{(7–3)}, 6–3	18
9.	(Sweden) Stefan Edberg	**1**	French Open, Paris, France	Clay	QF	6–4, 2–6, 6–3, 6–4	9
10.	(United States) Andre Agassi	4	French Open, Paris, France	Clay	F	3–6, 6–4, 2–6, 6–1, 6–4	9
11.	(United States) Pete Sampras	6	US Open, New York, United States	Hard	QF	6–2, 7–6^{(7–4)}, 7–6^{(7–5)}	5
12.	(Czechoslovakia) Karel Nováček	9	ATP Tour World Championships, Frankfurt, Germany	Carpet (i)	RR	6–7^{(6–8)}, 7–5, 6–4	2
13.	(France) Guy Forget	6	ATP Tour World Championships, Frankfurt, Germany	Carpet (i)	RR	7–6^{(7–4)}, 6–4	2
14.	(United States) Andre Agassi	8	ATP Tour World Championships, Frankfurt, Germany	Carpet (i)	SF	6–3, 7–5	2
1992
15.	(Sweden) Stefan Edberg	**1**	Australian Open, Melbourne, Australia	Hard	F	6–3, 3–6, 6–4, 6–2	2
16.	(France) Guy Forget	7	Brussels, Belgium	Carpet (i)	SF	7–6^{(9–7)}, 6–4	**1**
17.	(United States) Michael Chang	6	Tokyo, Japan	Hard	SF	6–2, 6–3	2
18.	(United States) Michael Chang	6	Hong Kong, Hong Kong	Hard	F	7–5, 6–3	**1**
19.	(Croatia) Goran Ivanišević	9	French Open, Paris, France	Clay	QF	6–2, 6–1, 2–6, 7–5	**1**
20.	(Czechoslovakia) Petr Korda	8	French Open, Paris, France	Clay	F	7–5, 6–2, 6–1	**1**
21.	(United States) Andre Agassi	9	US Open, New York, United States	Hard	QF	6–3, 6–7^{(6–8)}, 6–1, 6–4	**1**
22.	(Netherlands) Richard Krajicek	10	ATP Tour World Championships, Frankfurt, Germany	Carpet (i)	RR	6–7^{(4–7)}, 7–6^{(7–1)}, 7–5	**1**
23.	(United States) Michael Chang	5	ATP Tour World Championships, Frankfurt, Germany	Carpet (i)	RR	7–5, 6–2	**1**
24.	(United States) Pete Sampras	3	ATP Tour World Championships, Frankfurt, Germany	Carpet (i)	SF	7–6^{(7–5)}, 7–6^{(7–4)}	**1**
1993
25.	(Czech Republic) Petr Korda	7	Australian Open, Melbourne, Australia	Hard	QF	6–1, 6–0, 6–4	**1**
26.	(Sweden) Stefan Edberg	2	Australian Open, Melbourne, Australia	Hard	F	6–2, 6–1, 2–6, 7–5	**1**
27.	(United States) Michael Chang	5	Indian Wells, United States	Hard	SF	6–4, 6–4	**1**
28.	(United States) Michael Chang	9	Hong Kong, Hong Kong	Hard	SF	6–2, 6–3	2
29.	(United States) Michael Chang	10	Rome, Italy	Clay	SF	6–2, 6–7^{(2–7)}, 6–0	2
30.	(Croatia) Goran Ivanišević	6	Rome, Italy	Clay	F	6–1, 6–2, 6–2	2
31.	(Sweden) Stefan Edberg	3	Wimbledon, London, United Kingdom	Grass	SF	4–6, 6–4, 6–2, 6–4	2
32.	(Germany) Boris Becker	4	Indianapolis, United States	Hard	F	7–5, 6–3	2
1994
33.	(Croatia) Goran Ivanišević	8	Australian Open, Melbourne, Australia	Hard	QF	7–6^{(9–7)}, 6–4, 6–2	3
34.	(Croatia) Goran Ivanišević	6	Miami, United States	Hard	QF	6–3, 7–5	5
35.	(United States) Pete Sampras	**1**	French Open, Paris, France	Clay	QF	6–4, 5–7, 6–4, 6–4	7
1995
36.	(United States) Michael Chang	6	Tokyo, Japan	Hard	SF	6–4, 7–5	15
37.	(United States) Andre Agassi	**1**	Tokyo, Japan	Hard	F	6–3, 6–4	15
38.	(Austria) Thomas Muster	3	US Open, New York, United States	Hard	4R	6–3, 6–0, 7–6^{(7–4)}	15
39.	(United States) Michael Chang	5	US Open, New York, United States	Hard	QF	7–6^{(7–5)}, 7–6^{(7–3)}, 7–5	15
40.	(United States) Michael Chang	4	Paris, France	Carpet (i)	QF	6–2, 7–6^{(7–5)}	7
41.	(Austria) Thomas Muster	3	ATP Tour World Championships, Frankfurt, Germany	Carpet (i)	RR	6–4, 4–6, 6–4	7
1997
42.	(Austria) Thomas Muster	5	Doha, Qatar	Hard	QF	6–3, 7–5	26
43.	(South Africa) Wayne Ferreira	8	Dubai, United Arab Emirates	Hard	QF	6–2, 7–5	22
44.	(Netherlands) Richard Krajicek	6	Miami, United States	Hard	4R	7–6^{(8–6)}, 6–4	26
45.	(Croatia) Goran Ivanišević	5	Miami, United States	Hard	QF	6–2, 7–6^{(7–2)}	26
46.	(United States) Pete Sampras	**1**	Rome, Italy	Clay	1R	7–6^{(7–5)}, 6–4	24
47.	(Croatia) Goran Ivanišević	3	Los Angeles, United States	Hard	SF	6–3, 6–4	29
48.	(Sweden) Thomas Enqvist	8	Los Angeles, United States	Hard	F	6–4, 6–4	29
1998
49.	(Sweden) Jonas Björkman	5	Indian Wells, United States	Hard	2R	4–6, 6–1, 7–6^{(7–4)}	46
1999
50.	(United Kingdom) Tim Henman	7	Davis Cup, Birmingham, United Kingdom	Hard (i)	RR	7–6^{(7–2)}, 2–6, 7–6^{(7–3)}, 6–7^{(10–12)}, 7–5	54
51.	(Spain) Carlos Moyá	10	Wimbledon, London, United Kingdom	Grass	2R	6–3, 3–6, 7–6^{(7–1)}, 3–6, 6–2	61
52.	(United Kingdom) Tim Henman	5	Montreal, Canada	Hard	2R	6–1, 6–7^{(3–7)}, 6–4	46
53.	(Sweden) Thomas Enqvist	9	Paris, France	Carpet (i)	3R	6–7^{(3–7)}, 7–6^{(7–4)}, 7–5	39

== Champions Series titles ==
- 2005: Stanford Cup Houston – defeated Todd Martin 6–2, 6–3
- 2006: Champions Cup Naples – defeated Pat Cash 6–4, 7–6(8)
- 2006: The Championships at the Palisades – defeated Martin 5–7, 7–6(6), [10–4]
- 2008: The Residences at the Ritz-Carlton Grand Cayman Legends Championship – defeated Wayne Ferreira 7–6(3), 7–6(1)

NOTE: In Champions Series tournaments, there are only two sets. A tiebreaker to ten is held instead of a third set.

Sporting positions
Preceded by Stefan Edberg; Stefan Edberg; Stefan Edberg; Pete Sampras	World No. 1 February 10, 1992 - March 22, 1992; April 13, 1992 - September 13, 1992; October 5, 1992 - April 11, 1993; August 23, 1993 - September 12, 1993	Succeeded by Stefan Edberg; Stefan Edberg; Pete Sampras; Pete Sampras
Awards and achievements
Preceded by Stefan Edberg	ITF World Champion; 1992	Succeeded by Pete Sampras
Preceded by Stefan Edberg	ATP Player of the Year; 1992	Succeeded by Pete Sampras
Preceded by Pete Sampras	ATP Most Improved Player; 1991	Succeeded by Henrik Holm
Preceded by John McEnroe	ATP Champions Tour; Year-End No.1; 2004	Succeeded by Goran Ivanišević
