= Champions Series (senior men's tennis tour) =

The Champions Series was a series of tennis tournaments designed for former champion members of the ATP Tour. It operated from 2006 to 2021.

It consisted of tournaments where top players of the sport competed in one-night, four-player events with two one-set semifinal matches and a one-set championship match played in one evening. Eligible players competing on the Champions Series either held a Top 5 singles ranking; been a Grand-Slam singles finalist, or a singles player on a championship Davis Cup team during their ATP tour playing careers. It also allowed one wild card of their choice at each event. The series was produced by Inside Out Sports & Entertainment. The minimum age to participate in a tournament was 30.

No matches were played in 2013 as the series realigned from the fall to the spring. A new match format was introduced to complete all play on a single evening, with only four players involved. The new format is two semi-final matches consisting of a best-of-one-tiebreak set, followed by a one-set final for the championship.

== Naming rights ==
In 2006, Outback Steakhouse became the first sponsor with naming rights of the series.

In October 2011, Invesco QQQ signed a multi-year agreement to become the title sponsor.

== Player rankings ==
Top ranked players included:

=== 2008 ===
1. Jim Courier
2. John McEnroe
3. Todd Martin
4. Wayne Ferreira
5. Aaron Krickstein

=== 2007 ===
1. Todd Martin
2. Jim Courier
3. Pete Sampras
4. Wayne Ferreira
5. John McEnroe

=== 2006 ===
1. Jim Courier
2. John McEnroe
3. Todd Martin
4. Wayne Ferreira
5. Magnus Larsson

== 2008 Events/Results ==
The Oliver Group Champions Cup, March 12–16, 2008

- Todd Martin (USA) def. John McEnroe (USA), 6-3,6-1

The Residences at the Ritz-Carlton, Grand Cayman Legends Championship, April 16–20, 2008

- Jim Courier (USA) def. Wayne Ferreira (RSA), 7-6(3),7-6(6)

Champions Cup Boston, April 30- May 4, 2008

- John McEnroe (USA) def. Aaron Krickstein (USA), 5-7,6-3,10-5(TB)

== Former international events ==
- Champions Cup Athens, held in 2007 in Athens, Greece
- Stanford Cup held in 2005 and 2006 in Houston, Texas
- Stanford Championships held in 2006 in Memphis, Tennessee, relocated to Dallas in 2007

== 2007 Events/Results ==
The Oliver Group Champions Cup, March 7–11, 2007

- Wayne Ferreira (RSA) def. Aaron Krickstein (USA), 6-3, 6-3

Champions Cup Boston, May 2–6, 2007

- Pete Sampras (USA) def. Todd Martin (USA), 6-3,5-7,11-9(TB)

Champions Cup Athens, May 17–20, 2007

- Pete Sampras (USA) def. Todd Martin (USA), 6-3,1-6,10-6(TB)

The Gibson Guitar Champions Cup, August 22–26, 2007

- Todd Martin (USA) def. John McEnroe (USA), 7-5,7-5

The Championships at the Palisades, September 26–30, 2007

- Pete Sampras (USA) def. Todd Martin (USA), 6-3,6-4

The Stanford Championships, October 18–21, 2007

- Wayne Ferreira (RSA) def. Jim Courier (USA), 2-6,6-3,11-9(TB)

The Legends Rock Dubai, November 20–24, 2007

- Paul Haarhuis (NED) def. Jim Courier (USA), 6-1, 6-4

== 2006 Events/Results ==
Champions Cup Naples, March 10–13, 2006

- Jim Courier (USA) def. Pat Cash (AUS), 6-4,7-6(8)

Champions Cup Boston, April 27–30, 2006

- Todd Martin (USA) def. John McEnroe (USA), 6-3,4-6,10-8(TB)

The Championships at the Palisades, September 20–24, 2006

- Jim Courier (USA) def. Todd Martin (USA), 5-7,7-6(6),10-4(TB)

Stanford Championships, October 4–8, 2006

- Magnus Larsson (SWE) def. Wayne Ferreira (RSA), 6-3,6-4

Stanford Cup, November 8–12, 2006

- Wayne Ferreira (RSA) def. Magnus Larsson (SWE), 7-5,6-3
