= 1988 Frankfurt Cup – Singles =

Singles
- 1988 Frankfurt Cup

Final
- Champion: (United States) Tim Mayotte
- Runner-up: (Mexico) Leonardo Lavalle
- Score: 4–6, 6–4, 6–3

Details
- Draw: 32 (3WC/4Q)
- Seeds: 8

Events
Singles	Doubles
← 1987 ·	Frankfurt Cup	· 1989 →

Tim Mayotte successfully defended his title by defeating Leonardo Lavalle 4–6, 6–4, 6–3 in the final.

== Seeds ==
1. (United States) Tim Mayotte (champion)
2. (France) Henri Leconte (second round)
3. (Sweden) Anders Järryd (semifinals)
4. (United States) Brad Gilbert (quarterfinals)
5. (United States) Derrick Rostagno (second round)
6. (United States) Jim Pugh (semifinals)
7. (West Germany) Patrik Kühnen (quarterfinals)
8. (West Germany) Christian Saceanu (quarterfinals, retired)

== Draw ==
=== Key ===
- Q = Qualifier
- WC = Wild card
- LL = Lucky loser
- Alt = Alternate
- SE = Special exempt
- PR = Protected ranking
- ITF = ITF entry
- JE = Junior exempt
- w/o = Walkover
- r = Retired
- d = Defaulted
- SR = Special ranking

=== Finals ===
Semifinals
1	(United States) Tim Mayotte	7	6
6	(United States) Jim Pugh	5	4
3	(Sweden) Anders Järryd	6	5	1
(Mexico) Leonardo Lavalle	1	7	6

Final
1	(United States) Tim Mayotte	4	6	6
(Mexico) Leonardo Lavalle	6	4	3

=== Top half ===
First round
1	(United States) T Mayotte	6	3	6
(Czechoslovakia) L Pimek	1	6	1
(France) J Potier	2	3
(Mexico) A Moreno	6	6
(Sweden) T Svantesson	3	3
(Germany) R Osterthun	6	6
WC	(Sweden) N Kulti	7	4	3
7	(West Germany) P Kühnen	6	6	6
4	(United States) B Gilbert	6	6
(Argentina) J Frana	1	0
(Netherlands) T Nijssen	6	6	4
(United Kingdom) J Bates	4	7	6
(France) O Delaître	6	6
Q	(Socialist Federal Republic of Yugoslavia) D Buljević	4	4
(Belgium) E Masso	2	7	1
6	(United States) J Pugh	6	5	6

Second round
1	(United States) T Mayotte	6	6
(Mexico) A Moreno	3	0
(Germany) R Osterthun	5	1
7	(West Germany) P Kühnen	7	6
4	(United States) B Gilbert	6	6
(United Kingdom) J Bates	4	3
(France) O Delaître	2	5
6	(United States) J Pugh	6	7

Quarterfinals
1	(United States) T Mayotte	6	6
7	(West Germany) P Kühnen	3	0
4	(United States) B Gilbert	6	2	6
6	(United States) J Pugh	4	6	7

Semifinals
1	(United States) T Mayotte	7	6
6	(United States) J Pugh	5	4

=== Bottom half ===
First round
5	(United States) D Rostagno	6	7
(Australia) C Limberger	1	6
Q	(Germany) HD Beutel	3	6
(New Zealand) S Guy	6	7
Q	(Socialist Federal Republic of Yugoslavia) G Ivanišević	6	7
(Brazil) I Kley	2	5
(Brazil) D Marcelino	2	6	5
3	(Sweden) A Järryd	6	4	7
8	(West Germany) C Saceanu	6	6
WC	(West Germany) D Dier	0	2
(Czechoslovakia) M Střelba	6	1
(West Germany) M Rackl	7	6
(Mexico) L Lavalle	6	6	6
Q	(United States) K Jones	7	3	2
(United States) R Leach	6	1
2/WC	(France) H Leconte	7	6

Second round
5	(United States) D Rostagno	6	4
(New Zealand) S Guy	7	6
Q	(Socialist Federal Republic of Yugoslavia) G Ivanišević	4	3
3	(Sweden) A Järryd	6	6
8	(West Germany) C Saceanu	6	6
(West Germany) M Rackl	2	3
(Mexico) L Lavalle	6	7
2/WC	(France) H Leconte	4	5

Quarterfinals
(New Zealand) S Guy	6	0	4
3	(Sweden) A Järryd	4	6	6
8	(West Germany) C Saceanu
(Mexico) L Lavalle	w/o

Semifinals
3	(Sweden) A Järryd	6	5	1
(Mexico) L Lavalle	1	7	6
