= 1988 Frankfurt Cup – Doubles =

Doubles
- 1988 Frankfurt Cup

Final
- Champions: (West Germany) Rüdiger Haas (Socialist Federal Republic of Yugoslavia) Goran Ivanišević
- Runners-up: (United Kingdom) Jeremy Bates (Netherlands) Tom Nijssen
- Score: 1–6, 7–5, 6–3

Details
- Draw: 16
- Seeds: 4

Events
Singles	Doubles
← 1987 ·	Frankfurt Cup	· 1989 →

Boris Becker and Patrik Kühnen were the defending champions, but Becker chose to compete at Tokyo during the same week. Kühnen teamed up with Kelly Jones and lost in the first round to João Soares and Byron Talbot.

Rüdiger Haas and Goran Ivanišević won the title by defeating Jeremy Bates and Tom Nijssen 1–6, 7–5, 6–3 in the final.

== Seeds ==
1. (United States) Rick Leach / (United States) Jim Pugh (semifinals)
2. (United States) Kelly Jones / (West Germany) Patrik Kühnen (first round)
3. (United Kingdom) Jeremy Bates / (Netherlands) Tom Nijssen (final)
4. (Brazil) Ivan Kley / (Brazil) Danilo Marcelino (first round)

== Draw ==
=== Key ===
- Q = Qualifier
- WC = Wild card
- LL = Lucky loser
- Alt = Alternate
- SE = Special exempt
- PR = Protected ranking
- ITF = ITF entry
- JE = Junior exempt
- w/o = Walkover
- r = Retired
- d = Defaulted
- SR = Special ranking

=== Draw ===
First round
1	(United States) R Leach (United States) J Pugh	6	6
(West Germany) HD Beutel (West Germany) M Sinner	4	2
(West Germany) D Dier (Sweden) N Kulti	1	4
(Mexico) L Lavalle (West Germany) C Saceanu	6	6
4	(Brazil) I Kley (Brazil) D Marcelino	4	3
(Sweden) P Svensson (Sweden) LA Wahlgren	6	6
(West Germany) R Haas (Socialist Federal Republic of Yugoslavia) G Ivanišević	7	6
(Australia) C Limberger (Sweden) T Svantesson	6	4
(Argentina) J Frana (West Germany) R Osterthun	6	6	6
(Czechoslovakia) L Pimek (Czechoslovakia) M Střelba	4	7	2
(France) O Delaître (Belgium) E Masso	4	3
3	(United Kingdom) J Bates (Netherlands) T Nijssen	6	6
(West Germany) A Mronz (West Germany) U Riglewski	2	3
(United States) B Gilbert (United States) D Rostagno	6	6
(Brazil) J Soares (South Africa) B Talbot	6	7
2	(United States) K Jones (West Germany) P Kühnen	2	6

Quarterfinals
1	(United States) R Leach (United States) J Pugh	w/o
(Mexico) L Lavalle (West Germany) C Saceanu
(Sweden) P Svensson (Sweden) LA Wahlgren	6	4	3
(West Germany) R Haas (Socialist Federal Republic of Yugoslavia) G Ivanišević	4	6	6
(Argentina) J Frana (West Germany) R Osterthun	7	3	4
3	(United Kingdom) J Bates (Netherlands) T Nijssen	6	6	6
(United States) B Gilbert (United States) D Rostagno	7	6
(Brazil) J Soares (South Africa) B Talbot	6	4

Semifinals
1	(United States) R Leach (United States) J Pugh	6	4
(West Germany) R Haas (Socialist Federal Republic of Yugoslavia) G Ivanišević	7	6
3	(United Kingdom) J Bates (Netherlands) T Nijssen	6	6
(United States) B Gilbert (United States) D Rostagno	3	3

Final
(West Germany) R Haas (Socialist Federal Republic of Yugoslavia) G Ivanišević	1	7	6
3	(United Kingdom) J Bates (Netherlands) T Nijssen	6	5	3
