= 1988 Frankfurt Cup =

- Date: 17–23 October
- Edition: 2nd
- Category: Grand Prix
- Draw: 32S / 16D
- Prize money: $140,000
- Surface: Carpet / indoor
- Location: Frankfurt, West Germany

Champions

Singles
- (United States) Tim Mayotte

Doubles
- (West Germany) Rüdiger Haas / (Socialist Federal Republic of Yugoslavia) Goran Ivanišević
- Frankfurt Cup

The 1988 Frankfurt Cup, was a men's tennis tournament played on indoor carpet courts and in Frankfurt, West Germany that was part of the 1988 Grand Prix circuit. It was the second edition of the tournament was held from 17 October until 23 October 1988. First-seeded Tim Mayotte won the singles title.

== Finals ==
=== Singles ===
(United States) Tim Mayotte defeated (Mexico) Leonardo Lavalle, 4–6, 6–4, 6–3

- It was Mayotte's 4th and last singles title of the year and the 11th of his career.

=== Doubles ===
(West Germany) Rüdiger Haas / (Socialist Federal Republic of Yugoslavia) Goran Ivanišević defeated (United Kingdom) Jeremy Bates / (Netherlands) Tom Nijssen, 1–6, 7–5, 6–3

- It was Haas's only doubles title of the year and the 1st of his career. It was Ivanišević's only doubles title of the year and the 1st of his career.
