= 1992 Eurocard Open – Doubles =

Doubles
- 1992 Eurocard Open

Final
- Champions: (Netherlands) Tom Nijssen (Czech Republic) Cyril Suk
- Runners-up: (Australia) John Fitzgerald (Sweden) Anders Järryd
- Score: 6–3, 6–7, 6–3

Details
- Draw: 16 (2WC/1Q)
- Seeds: 4

Events
| Singles | Doubles |
| ← 1991 · | Eurocard Open | · 1993 → |

Sergio Casal and Emilio Sánchez were the defending champions, but did not play this year.

Tom Nijssen and Cyril Suk won the title, by defeating John Fitzgerald and Anders Järryd 6–3, 6–7, 6–3 in the final.

== Seeds ==
1. (Australia) John Fitzgerald / (Sweden) Anders Järryd (final)
2. (United States) Luke Jensen / (Australia) Laurie Warder (first round)
3. (Netherlands) Tom Nijssen / (Czech Republic) Cyril Suk (champions)
4. (Italy) Omar Camporese / (Croatia) Goran Ivanišević (quarterfinals)

== Draw ==
=== Key ===
- Q = Qualifier
- WC = Wild card
- LL = Lucky loser
- Alt = Alternate
- ITF = ITF entry
- PR = Protected ranking
- SR = Special ranking
- SE = Special exempt
- JE = Junior exempt
- JR = Junior Accelerator Programme entrant
- CO = College Accelerator Programme entrant
- NG = Next Gen Accelerator Program entrant
- w/o = Walkover
- r = Retired
- d = Defaulted

=== Draw ===
First round
1 | (Australia) J Fitzgerald (Sweden) A Järryd | 6 | 6 | 6
(United States) C Beckman (United States) S Melville | 4 | 7 | 3
(Czechoslovakia) V Flégl (Czechoslovakia) P Korda | 6 | 6 | 6
(Sweden) R Bergh (Sweden) S Edberg | 2 | 7 | 4
4 | (Italy) O Camporese (Croatia) G Ivanišević | 6 | 6
(Spain) T Carbonell (Sweden) J Gunnarsson | 3 | 3
(Netherlands) R Krajicek (Netherlands) J Siemerink | 6 | 3 | 6
(Italy) D Nargiso (Germany) U Riglewski | 4 | 6 | 7
WC | (United States) J McEnroe (United States) P McEnroe | 6 | 6 | 6
(United States) S DeVries (Australia) D Macpherson | 7 | 2 | 7
Q | (Israel) G Bloom (Kenya) P Wekesa | 3 | 2
3 | (Netherlands) T Nijssen (Czechoslovakia) C Suk | 6 | 6
WC | (Germany) B Becker (Socialist Federal Republic of Yugoslavia) S Živojinović | 6 | 4
(Netherlands) HJ Davids (Czechoslovakia) L Pimek | 7 | 6
(France) G Forget (Switzerland) J Hlasek | 6 | 6
2 | (United States) L Jensen (Australia) L Warder | 4 | 4

Quarterfinals
1 | (Australia) J Fitzgerald (Sweden) A Järryd | 6 | 6 | 7
(Czechoslovakia) V Flégl (Czechoslovakia) P Korda | 7 | 4 | 6
4 | (Italy) O Camporese (Croatia) G Ivanišević | 6 | 6
(Italy) D Nargiso (Germany) U Riglewski | 7 | 7
(United States) S DeVries (Australia) D Macpherson | 6 | 3 | 1
3 | (Netherlands) T Nijssen (Czechoslovakia) C Suk | 3 | 6 | 6
(Netherlands) HJ Davids (Czechoslovakia) L Pimek | 3 | 7 | 6
(France) G Forget (Switzerland) J Hlasek | 6 | 6 | 2

Semifinals
1 | (Australia) J Fitzgerald (Sweden) A Järryd | 6 | 7
(Italy) D Nargiso (Germany) U Riglewski | 3 | 6
3 | (Netherlands) T Nijssen (Czechoslovakia) C Suk | 7 | 7
(Netherlands) HJ Davids (Czechoslovakia) L Pimek | 6 | 6

Final
1 | (Australia) J Fitzgerald (Sweden) A Järryd | 3 | 7 | 3
3 | (Netherlands) T Nijssen (Czechoslovakia) C Suk | 6 | 6 | 6
