= 1995 Eurocard Open (February) – Doubles =

Doubles
- 1995 Eurocard Open (February)

Final
- Champions: (Canada) Grant Connell (United States) Patrick Galbraith
- Runners-up: (Czech Republic) Cyril Suk (Czech Republic) Daniel Vacek
- Score: 6–2, 6–2

Details
- Draw: 16 (2WC/1Q)
- Seeds: 4

Events
Singles	Doubles
- Eurocard Open

David Adams and Andrei Olhovskiy were the defending champions, but lost in the first round to wild cards Patrik Kühnen and Michael Stich.

Grant Connell and Patrick Galbraith won the title by defeating Cyril Suk and Daniel Vacek 6–2, 6–2 in the final.

== Seeds ==
1. (Canada) Grant Connell / (United States) Patrick Galbraith (champions)
2. (South Africa) David Adams / (Russia) Andrei Olhovskiy (first round)
3. (South Africa) Wayne Ferreira / (Spain) Javier Sánchez (first round)
4. (Sweden) Henrik Holm / (Sweden) Magnus Larsson (first round)

== Draw ==
Key

- Q = Qualifier
- WC = Wild card
- LL = Lucky loser
- Alt = Alternate
- ITF = ITF entry
- PR = Protected ranking
- SR = Special ranking
- SE = Special exempt
- JE = Junior exempt
- JR = Junior Accelerator Programme entrant
- CO = College Accelerator Programme entrant
- NG = Next Gen Accelerator Program entrant
- w/o = Walkover
- r = Retired
- d = Defaulted

=== Draw ===
First round
1	(Canada) G Connell (United States) P Galbraith	6	6	6
(Switzerland) J Hlasek (Russia) Y Kefelnikov	7	2	4
WC	(Germany) B Becker (Germany) CU Steeb	3	7	6
(France) O Delaître (South Africa) G Muller	6	6	7
3	(South Africa) W Ferreira (Spain) J Sánchez	4	4
(Czech Republic) M Damm (Czech Republic) K Nováček	6	6
Q	(United States) M Keil (Sweden) P Nyborg	7	6
(Czech Republic) V Flégl (Germany) M Sinner	5	3
(Netherlands) HJ Davids (South Africa) P Norval	7	6	3
(Netherlands) T Nijssen (Netherlands) M Oosting	6	7	6
(Czech Republic) C Suk (Czech Republic) D Vacek	6	6	7
4	(Sweden) H Holm (Sweden) M Larsson	7	4	5
(South Africa) L Bale (South Africa) JL de Jager	7	7
(Spain) S Casal (Spain) E Sánchez	6	6
WC	(Germany) P Kühnen (Germany) M Stich	7	5	7
2	(South Africa) D Adams (Russia) A Olhovskiy	5	7	6

Quarterfinals
1	(Canada) G Connell (United States) P Galbraith	6	6	6
(France) O Delaître (South Africa) G Muller	7	1	4
(Czech Republic) M Damm (Czech Republic) K Nováček	6	7
Q	(United States) M Keil (Sweden) P Nyborg	4	6
(Netherlands) T Nijssen (Netherlands) M Oosting	7	3	1
(Czech Republic) C Suk (Czech Republic) D Vacek	5	6	6
(South Africa) L Bale (South Africa) JL de Jager	3	6	7
WC	(Germany) P Kühnen (Germany) M Stich	6	3	6

Semifinals
1	(Canada) G Connell (United States) P Galbraith	3	7	6
(Czech Republic) M Damm (Czech Republic) K Nováček	6	6	3
(Czech Republic) C Suk (Czech Republic) D Vacek	7	4	6
(South Africa) L Bale (South Africa) JL de Jager	6	6	4

Final
1	(Canada) G Connell (United States) P Galbraith	6	6
(Czech Republic) C Suk (Czech Republic) D Vacek	2	2
