= 1990 Ebel U.S. Pro Indoor – Singles =

Singles
- 1990 Ebel U.S. Pro Indoor

Final
- Champion: (United States) Pete Sampras
- Runner-up: (Ecuador) Andrés Gómez
- Score: 7–6^{(7–4)}, 7–5, 6–2

Details
- Draw: 48
- Seeds: 16

Events
Singles	Doubles
← 1989 ·	U.S. Pro Indoor	· 1991 →

Pete Sampras defeated Andrés Gómez in the final, 7–6^{(7–4)}, 7–5, 6–2 to win the singles tennis title at the 1990 Ebel U.S. Pro Indoor. It was his maiden singles title.

Boris Becker was the reigning champion, but opted to play at the Eurocard Classic instead.

== Seeds ==
All seeds receive a bye into the second round.

1. (United States) John McEnroe (second round)
2. (United States) Brad Gilbert (third round)
3. (United States) Andre Agassi (third round, retired)
4. (United States) Jay Berger (quarterfinals)
5. (United States) Tim Mayotte (quarterfinals)
6. (Soviet Union) Andrei Chesnokov (second round)
7. (Ecuador) Andrés Gómez (final)
8. (United States) Jim Courier (quarterfinals)
9. (United States) Kevin Curren (third round)
10. (South Africa) Christo van Rensburg (third round)
11. (Peru) Jaime Yzaga (third round)
12. (United States) David Wheaton (second round)
13. (United States) Pete Sampras (champion)
14. (Australia) Wally Masur (third round)
15. (United States) Scott Davis (second round)
16. (Sweden) Mikael Pernfors (second round)

== Draw ==
=== Key ===
- Q = Qualifier
- WC = Wild card
- LL = Lucky loser
- Alt = Alternate
- SE = Special exempt
- PR = Protected ranking
- ITF = ITF entry
- JE = Junior exempt
- w/o = Walkover
- r = Retired
- d = Defaulted
- SR = Special ranking

=== Finals ===
Quarterfinals
Q	(Australia) Mark Kratzmann	4	6	7^{9}
8	(United States) Jim Courier	6	3	6^{7}
13	(United States) Pete Sampras	6	4	6
5	(United States) Tim Mayotte	4	6	3
(Czechoslovakia) Petr Korda	7^{7}	6
4	(United States) Jay Berger	6^{5}	1
7	(Ecuador) Andrés Gómez	7^{7}	6^{7}	6
(Netherlands) Paul Haarhuis	6^{3}	7^{9}	4

Semifinals
Q	(Australia) Mark Kratzmann	6	1	4
13	(United States) Pete Sampras	4	6	6
(Czechoslovakia) Petr Korda	2	0
7	(Ecuador) Andrés Gómez	6	6

Final
13	(United States) Pete Sampras	7^{7}	7	6
7	(Ecuador) Andrés Gómez	6^{4}	5	2

=== Top half ===
==== Section 1 ====
First round
(United States) R Reneberg	6	3	6
(United States) J Pugh	3	6	3
Q	(Australia) M Kratzmann	7	6
Q	(United States) B Pearce	5	4
(Sweden) N Kroon	7^{15}	2	4
(United States) P Annacone	6^{13}	6	6
(New Zealand) K Evernden	6	7
(United States) J Brown	3	5

Second round
1	(United States) J McEnroe	7	3	3
(United States) R Reneberg	6	6	6
Q	(Australia) M Kratzmann	7	4	6
15	(United States) S Davis	5	6	1
10	(South Africa) C van Rensburg	0	7^{7}	6
(United States) P Annacone	6	6^{5}	4
(New Zealand) K Evernden	6^{5}	4
8	(United States) J Courier	7^{7}	6

Third round
(United States) R Reneberg	4	4
Q	(Australia) M Kratzmann	6	6
10	(South Africa) C van Rensburg	3	7	4
8	(United States) J Courier	6	5	6

Quarterfinals
Q	(Australia) M Kratzmann	4	6	7^{9}
8	(United States) J Courier	6	3	6^{7}

==== Section 2 ====
First round
(France) J-P Fleurian	7^{9}	4	6
WC	(United States) K Flach	6^{7}	6	4
(Czechoslovakia) M Šrejber	3	7^{9}	6
(West Germany) J Wöhrmann	6	6^{7}	2
(United States) G Layendecker	6	6
WC	(Sweden) P Lundgren	3	2
(United States) D Rostagno	7^{8}	5	7^{7}
WC	(United States) M Washington	6^{6}	7	6^{2}

Second round
3	(United States) A Agassi	2	6	6
(France) J-P Fleurian	6	0	1
(Czechoslovakia) M Šrejber	3	7^{7}	3
13	(United States) P Sampras	6	6^{4}	6
12	(United States) D Wheaton	3	6	4
(United States) G Layendecker	6	4	6
(United States) D Rostagno	2	6	6^{5}
5	(United States) T Mayotte	6	3	7^{7}

Third round
3	(United States) A Agassi	7	5^{r}
13	(United States) P Sampras	5	7
(United States) G Layendecker	6	3	6^{4}
5	(United States) T Mayotte	4	6	7^{7}

Quarterfinals
13	(United States) P Sampras	6	4	6
5	(United States) T Mayotte	4	6	3

=== Bottom half ===
==== Section 3 ====
First round
(Czechoslovakia) P Korda	6	6
(United States) L Duncan	3	1
Q	(United States) C Garner	7	2	7
Q	(United States) D Cassidy	5	6	5
(United States) D Goldie	2	6	6
(United States) P Chamberlin	6	4	4
(Netherlands) M Schapers	6^{5}	6	7^{7}
(Australia) D Cahill	7^{7}	3	6^{4}

Second round
6	(Soviet Union) A Chesnokov	2	4
(Czechoslovakia) P Korda	6	6
Q	(United States) C Garner	0	4
11	(Peru) J Yzaga	6	6
14	(Australia) W Masur	2	7^{7}	6
(United States) D Goldie	6	6^{2}	2
(Netherlands) M Schapers	6^{3}	7^{11}	4
4	(United States) J Berger	7^{7}	6^{9}	6

Third round
(Czechoslovakia) P Korda	2	6	7
11	(Peru) J Yzaga	6	3	5
14	(Australia) W Masur	4	4
4	(United States) J Berger	6	6

Quarterfinals
(Czechoslovakia) P Korda	7^{7}	6
4	(United States) J Berger	6^{5}	1

==== Section 4 ====
First round
(Canada) A Sznajder	6	4	7^{9}
Q	(Australia) J Fitzgerald	3	6	6^{7}
(India) R Krishnan	6	6
(United States) T Witsken	2	2
(France) J Potier	3	4
(Netherlands) P Haarhuis	6	6
WC	(United States) R Leach	4	6
Q	(United States) T Wilkison	6	7

Second round
7	(Ecuador) A Gómez	7	6
(Canada) A Sznajder	5	2
(India) R Krishnan	2	6	3
9	(United States) K Curren	6	4	6
16	(Sweden) M Pernfors	6	6^{0}	5
(Netherlands) P Haarhuis	4	7^{7}	7
Q	(United States) T Wilkison	2	5
2	(United States) B Gilbert	6	7

Third round
7	(Ecuador) A Gómez	6^{3}	6	6
9	(United States) K Curren	7^{7}	3	4
(Netherlands) P Haarhuis	7^{10}	5	6
2	(United States) B Gilbert	6^{8}	7	4

Quarterfinals
7	(Ecuador) A Gómez	7^{7}	6^{7}	6
(Netherlands) P Haarhuis	6^{3}	7^{9}	4
