= 1995 Eurocard Open (February) – Singles =

Singles
- 1995 Eurocard Open (February)

Final
- Champion: (Netherlands) Richard Krajicek
- Runner-up: (Germany) Michael Stich
- Score: 7–6^{(7–4)}, 6–3, 6–7^{(6–8)}, 1–6, 6–3

Details
- Draw: 48
- Seeds: 8

Events
Singles	Doubles
← 1994 ·	Eurocard Open	· 1995 →

The 1995 Eurocard Open (February) – Singles was an event of the 1995 Eurocard Open (February) men's tennis tournament which was held from 20 February until 26 February 1995, at the Hanns-Martin-Schleyer-Halle in Stuttgart, Germany. The tournament was part of Championship Series of the 1995 ATP Tour. The singles draw consisted of 48 players and eight of them were seeded.

Stefan Edberg was the defending champion but did not compete in this edition.

Unseeded Richard Krajicek defeated fifth-seeded Michael Stich in the final, 7–6^{(7–4)}, 6–3, 6–7^{(6–8)}, 1–6, 6–3 to win the singles tennis title.

== Seeds ==
1. (Germany) Boris Becker (semifinals)
2. (Croatia) Goran Ivanišević (first round, retired)
3. (Spain) Sergi Bruguera (first round)
4. (Spain) Alberto Berasategui (second round)
5. (Germany) Michael Stich (final)
6. (Withdrew)
7. (Russia) Yevgeny Kafelnikov (quarterfinals)
8. (South Africa) Wayne Ferreira (second round)

== Draw ==
Key

- Q = Qualifier
- WC = Wild card
- LL = Lucky loser
- Alt = Alternate
- ITF = ITF entry
- PR = Protected ranking
- SR = Special ranking
- SE = Special exempt
- JE = Junior exempt
- JR = Junior Accelerator Programme entrant
- CO = College Accelerator Programme entrant
- NG = Next Gen Accelerator Program entrant
- w/o = Walkover
- r = Retired
- d = Defaulted

=== Finals ===
Semifinals
1/WC	(Germany) Boris Becker	0	3
5	(Germany) Michael Stich	6	6
Q	(Czech Republic) Martin Damm	2	3
(Netherlands) Richard Krajicek	6	6

Final
5	(Germany) Michael Stich	6^{4}	3	7^{8}	6	3
(Netherlands) Richard Krajicek	7^{7}	6	6^{6}	1	6

=== Top half ===
First Round
1/WC	(Germany) Boris Becker	6	6
WC	(Germany) Patrik Kühnen	3	3
(United States) Aaron Krickstein	7^{7}	6
(Spain) Francisco Clavet	6^{2}	1
(United States) David Wheaton	6	7
(Spain) Javier Sánchez	4	5
(Czech Republic) Petr Korda	2	1
7	(Russia) Yevgeny Kafelnikov	6	6
3	(Spain) Sergi Bruguera	4	3^{r}
(Russia) Alexander Volkov	6	2
(France) Guy Forget	3	5
(Czech Republic) Karel Nováček	6	7
Q	(Russia) Andrei Olhovskiy	6^{3}	2
(Czech Republic) Daniel Vacek	7^{7}	6
(Spain) Carlos Costa	3	4
5	(Germany) Michael Stich	6	6

Second Round
1/WC	(Germany) Boris Becker	6	6
(United States) Aaron Krickstein	3	3
(United States) David Wheaton	5	6	4
7	(Russia) Yevgeny Kafelnikov	7	4	6
(Russia) Alexander Volkov	3	6	6
(Czech Republic) Karel Nováček	6	3	0
(Czech Republic) Daniel Vacek	3	4
5	(Germany) Michael Stich	6	6

Quarterfinals
1/WC	(Germany) Boris Becker	7^{7}	7^{7}
7	(Russia) Yevgeny Kafelnikov	6^{4}	6^{1}
(Russia) Alexander Volkov	2	5
5	(Germany) Michael Stich	6	7

Semifinals
1/WC	(Germany) Boris Becker	0	3
5	(Germany) Michael Stich	6	6

=== Bottom half ===
First Round
LL	(Netherlands) Jan Siemerink	3	6	6
(Austria) Horst Skoff	6	4	2
(Australia) Jason Stoltenberg	4	1
(Germany) Bernd Karbacher	6	6
Q	(Germany) Martin Sinner	2	2
Q	(Czech Republic) Martin Damm	6	6
(France) Olivier Delaître	6	3	4
4	(Spain) Alberto Berasategui	4	6	6
8	(South Africa) Wayne Ferreira	2	6	6
Q	(Germany) Hendrik Dreekmann	6	4	3
(Netherlands) Richard Krajicek	6	2	6
(Czech Republic) Ctislav Doseděl	4	6	2
(Italy) Andrea Gaudenzi	2	1^{r}
WC	(Austria) Thomas Muster	6	5
(Sweden) Magnus Larsson	4
2	(Croatia) Goran Ivanišević	0^{r}

Second Round
LL	(Netherlands) Jan Siemerink	7	6
(Germany) Bernd Karbacher	5	2
Q	(Czech Republic) Martin Damm	6	6
4	(Spain) Alberto Berasategui	4	4
8	(South Africa) Wayne Ferreira	3	6^{0}
(Netherlands) Richard Krajicek	6	7^{7}
WC	(Austria) Thomas Muster	5	7	4
(Sweden) Magnus Larsson	7	5	6

Quarterfinals
LL	(Netherlands) Jan Siemerink	4	4
Q	(Czech Republic) Martin Damm	6	6
(Netherlands) Richard Krajicek	6	6^{9}	7^{7}
(Sweden) Magnus Larsson	3	7^{11}	6^{5}

Semifinals
Q	(Czech Republic) Martin Damm	2	3
(Netherlands) Richard Krajicek	6	6
