= 1990 Eurocard Classics =

- Date: 19–25 February
- Edition: 1st
- Category: Championship Series DW
- Draw: 32S / 16D
- Prize money: $825,000
- Surface: Carpet / indoor
- Location: Stuttgart, West Germany
- Venue: Hanns-Martin-Schleyer-Halle

Champions

Singles
- (Germany) Boris Becker

Doubles
- (France) Guy Forget / (Switzerland) Jakob Hlasek
- Eurocard Open

The 1990 Eurocard Classics was a tennis tournament played on indoor carpet courts. It was the 1st edition of the event known that year as the Eurocard Classics (previously held as the Stuttgart Classic exhibition event in 1988 and 1989), and was part of the ATP Championship Series, double-week events of the 1990 ATP Tour, running concurrently with the 1990 Ebel U.S. Pro Indoor. It took place at the Hanns-Martin-Schleyer-Halle in Stuttgart, West Germany, from 19 February until 25 February 1990. Second-seeded Boris Becker won the singles title.

== Finals ==
=== Singles ===
(West Germany) Boris Becker defeated (Czechoslovakia) Ivan Lendl, 6–2, 6–2

- It was Becker's 2nd singles title of the year, and the 26th of his career.

=== Doubles ===
(France) Guy Forget / (Switzerland) Jakob Hlasek defeated (Denmark) Michael Mortensen / (Netherlands) Tom Nijssen, 6–3, 6–2

- It was Forget's first doubles title of the year, and the 17th of his career.
- It was Hlasek's first doubles title of the year, and the ninth of his career.
