= 1990 Eurocard Classics – Doubles =

Doubles
- 1990 Eurocard Classics
- no Champions: first event

Final
- Champions: (France) Guy Forget (Switzerland) Jakob Hlasek
- Runners-up: (Denmark) Michael Mortensen (Netherlands) Tom Nijssen
- Score: 6–3, 6–2

Details
- Draw: 16
- Seeds: 4

Events
Singles	Doubles
Eurocard Open	· 1991 →

It was the first edition of the Eurocard Classics. Guy Forget and Jakob Hlasek won the inaugural doubles title, defeating Michael Mortensen and Tom Nijssen 6–3, 6–2 in the final.

== Seeds ==
1. (United States) Tim Pawsat / (Australia) Laurie Warder (first round)
2. (Spain) Javier Sánchez / (Socialist Federal Republic of Yugoslavia) Goran Ivanišević (first round)
3. (Iran) Mansour Bahrami / (France) Éric Winogradsky (quarterfinals)
4. (Spain) Sergio Casal / (Spain) Emilio Sánchez (first round)

== Draw ==
=== Key ===
- Q = Qualifier
- WC = Wild card
- LL = Lucky loser
- Alt = Alternate
- SE = Special exempt
- PR = Protected ranking
- ITF = ITF entry
- JE = Junior exempt
- w/o = Walkover
- r = Retired
- d = Defaulted
- SR = Special ranking

=== Draw ===
First round
1	(United States) T Pawsat (Australia) L Warder	6	6^{6}	4
(Czechoslovakia) T Šmíd (Socialist Federal Republic of Yugoslavia) S Živojinović	4	7^{8}	6
(United States) C Beckman (United States) L Jensen	6	7^{8}
(Czechoslovakia) I Lendl (United States) T Nelson	3	6^{6}
4	(Spain) S Casal (Spain) E Sánchez	3	2
(France) G Forget (Switzerland) J Hlasek	6	6
(Italy) O Camporese (Sweden) J Gunnarsson	6	7^{7}
(Italy) D Nargiso (Venezuela) N Pereira	4	6^{5}
(West Germany) B Becker (West Germany) E Jelen	7^{7}	3	7
(West Germany) U Riglewski (West Germany) M Stich	6^{4}	6	5
(United States) P Galbraith (Australia) D Macpherson	6^{3}	4
3	(Iran) M Bahrami (France) É Winogradsky	7^{7}	6
(Denmark) M Mortensen (Netherlands) T Nijssen	6	6^{0}	7^{7}
(Australia) B Dyke (Hungary) B Taróczy	1	7^{7}	6^{3}
(Austria) A Antonitsch (United Kingdom) A Castle	6	5	7^{7}
2	(Spain) J Sánchez (Socialist Federal Republic of Yugoslavia) G Ivanišević	2	7	6^{5}

Quarterfinals
(Czechoslovakia) T Šmíd (Socialist Federal Republic of Yugoslavia) S Živojinović	7^{12}	2	6
(United States) C Beckman (United States) L Jensen	6^{10}	6	4
(France) G Forget (Switzerland) J Hlasek	7	6
(Italy) O Camporese (Sweden) J Gunnarsson	5	4
(West Germany) B Becker (West Germany) E Jelen	7^{7}	7
3	(Iran) M Bahrami (France) É Winogradsky	6^{5}	5
(Denmark) M Mortensen (Netherlands) T Nijssen	7^{7}	6^{8}	6
(Austria) A Antonitsch (United Kingdom) A Castle	6^{2}	7^{10}	4

Semifinals
(Czechoslovakia) T Šmíd (Socialist Federal Republic of Yugoslavia) S Živojinović	4	4
(France) G Forget (Switzerland) J Hlasek	6	6
(West Germany) B Becker (West Germany) E Jelen
(Denmark) M Mortensen (Netherlands) T Nijssen	w/o

Final
(France) G Forget (Switzerland) J Hlasek	6	6
(Denmark) M Mortensen (Netherlands) T Nijssen	3	2
