= 1994 Eurocard Open – Doubles =

Doubles
- 1994 Eurocard Open

Final
- Champions: (South Africa) David Adams (Russia) Andrei Olhovskiy
- Runners-up: (Canada) Grant Connell (United States) Patrick Galbraith
- Score: 6–7, 6–4, 7–6

Details
- Draw: 16
- Seeds: 4

Events
Singles	Doubles
- Eurocard Open

Mark Kratzmann and Wally Masur were the defending champions, but lost in first round to Sergio Casal and Emilio Sánchez.

David Adams and Andrei Olhovskiy won the title by defeating Grant Connell and Patrick Galbraith 6–7, 6–4, 7–6 in the final.

== Seeds ==
1. (Canada) Grant Connell / (United States) Patrick Galbraith (final)
2. (South Africa) Gary Muller / (Australia) Mark Woodforde (quarterfinals)
3. (Netherlands) Tom Nijssen / (Czech Republic) Cyril Suk (semifinals)
4. (South Africa) David Adams / (Russia) Andrei Olhovskiy (champions)

== Draw ==
Key

- Q = Qualifier
- WC = Wild card
- LL = Lucky loser
- Alt = Alternate
- ITF = ITF entry
- PR = Protected ranking
- SR = Special ranking
- SE = Special exempt
- JE = Junior exempt
- JR = Junior Accelerator Programme entrant
- CO = College Accelerator Programme entrant
- NG = Next Gen Accelerator Program entrant
- w/o = Walkover
- r = Retired
- d = Defaulted

=== Draw ===
First round
1	(Canada) G Connell (United States) P Galbraith	6	6
(Netherlands) HJ Davids (South Africa) P Norval	2	4
(United States) S Melville (United States) B Pearce	6	7
WC	(Croatia) G Ivanišević (France) H Leconte	4	5
3	(Netherlands) T Nijssen (Czech Republic) C Suk	6	7
(Czech Republic) M Damm (Czech Republic) K Nováček	1	6
(South Africa) W Ferreira (Sweden) H Holm	4	7	6
Q	(Australia) D Cahill (Australia) J Fitzgerald	6	6	1
(Australia) M Kratzmann (Australia) W Masur	3	4
(Spain) S Casal (Spain) E Sánchez	6	6
(Netherlands) M Oosting (Germany) D Prinosil	3	3
4	(South Africa) D Adams (Russia) A Olhovskiy	6	6
(Sweden) S Edberg (Czech Republic) P Korda	6	6
WC	(Germany) U Riglewski (Germany) M Stich	3	1
(United States) K Flach (Sweden) A Järryd	4	4
2	(South Africa) G Muller (Australia) M Woodforde	6	6

Quarterfinals
1	(Canada) G Connell (United States) P Galbraith	3	6	6
(United States) S Melville (United States) B Pearce	6	4	2
3	(Netherlands) T Nijssen (Czech Republic) C Suk	6	7
(South Africa) W Ferreira (Sweden) H Holm	2	5
(Spain) S Casal (Spain) E Sánchez	2	5
4	(South Africa) D Adams (Russia) A Olhovskiy	6	7
(Sweden) S Edberg (Czech Republic) P Korda	3	7	7
2	(South Africa) G Muller (Australia) M Woodforde	6	6	6

Semifinals
1	(Canada) G Connell (United States) P Galbraith	6	3	7
3	(Netherlands) T Nijssen (Czech Republic) C Suk	3	6	6
4	(South Africa) D Adams (Russia) A Olhovskiy	6	6
(Sweden) S Edberg (Czech Republic) P Korda	1	4

Final
1	(Canada) G Connell (United States) P Galbraith	7	4	6
4	(South Africa) D Adams (Russia) A Olhovskiy	6	6	7
