= 1988 Stuttgart Classic – Draw =

Draw
- 1988 Stuttgart Classic

Final
- Champion: (Czechoslovakia) Miloslav Mečíř
- Runner-up: (Ecuador) Andrés Gómez
- Score: 6–3, 6–2
- Stuttgart Classic

Miloslav Mečíř won in the final 6–3, 6–2, against Andrés Gómez.

== Players ==
1. (Czechoslovakia) Ivan Lendl (round robin)
2. (United States) Andre Agassi (withdrew due to a hand injury)
3. (West Germany) Boris Becker (withdrew due to a leg injury)
4. (United States) Jimmy Connors (round robin)
5. (United States) Tim Mayotte (round robin)
6. (Czechoslovakia) Miloslav Mečíř (champion)
7. (United States) John McEnroe (semifinals)
8. (Ecuador) Andrés Gómez (final)
9. (West Germany) Carl-Uwe Steeb (replaces Boris Becker, Semifinals)
10. (West Germany) Eric Jelen (replaces Andre Agassi, round robin)

== Draw ==
Key

- Q = Qualifier
- WC = Wild card
- LL = Lucky loser
- Alt = Alternate
- ITF = ITF entry
- PR = Protected ranking
- SR = Special ranking
- SE = Special exempt
- JE = Junior exempt
- JR = Junior Accelerator Programme entrant
- CO = College Accelerator Programme entrant
- NG = Next Gen Accelerator Program entrant
- w/o = Walkover
- r = Retired
- d = Defaulted

=== Finals ===
Semifinals
7	(United States) John McEnroe	7	6^{1}	3
6	(Czechoslovakia) Miloslav Mečíř	5	7	6
9	(West Germany) Carl-Uwe Steeb	7	2	3
8	(Ecuador) Andrés Gómez	5	6	6

Final
6	(Czechoslovakia) Miloslav Mečíř	6	6
8	(Ecuador) Andrés Gómez	3	2

=== Group one ===
		(Czechoslovakia) Ivan Lendl	(West Germany) Boris Becker (West Germany) Carl-Uwe Steeb	(United States) Tim Mayotte	(United States) John McEnroe	RR W–L	Set W–L	Game W–L	Standings
1	(Czechoslovakia) Ivan Lendl		6–7(3), 5–7 (w/ Steeb)	6–3, 6–1	6–7(3), 6–7(4)	1–2	2–4	35–32	3
3; 9	(West Germany) Boris Becker (West Germany) Carl-Uwe Steeb	7–6(3), 7–5 (w/ Steeb)		7–5, 6–3 (w/ Steeb)	4–6, 4–6 (w/ Steeb)	0–0; 2–1	0–0; 4–2	0–0; 35–31	N/A; 2
5	(United States) Tim Mayotte	3–6, 1–6	5–7, 3–6 (w/ Steeb)		3–6, 2–6	0–3	0–6	17–37	4
7	(United States) John McEnroe	7–6(3), 7–6(4)	6–4, 6–4 (w/ Steeb)	6–3, 6–2		3–0	6–0	38–25	1

Standings are determined by: 1. number of wins; 2. number of matches; 3. in two-players-ties, head-to-head records; 4. in three-players-ties, percentage of sets won, or of games won; 5. steering-committee decision.

=== Group two ===
		(United States) Andre Agassi (West Germany) Eric Jelen	(United States) Jimmy Connors	(Czechoslovakia) Miloslav Mečíř	(Ecuador) Andrés Gómez	RR W–L	Set W–L	Game W–L	Standings
2; 10	(United States) Andre Agassi (West Germany) Eric Jelen		3–6, 6–4, 6–2 (w/ Jelen)	4–6, 6–7(3) (w/ Jelen)	6–2, 6–3 (w/ Jelen)	0–0; 2–1	0–0; 4–3	0–0; 37–30	N/A; 3
4	(United States) Jimmy Connors	6–3, 4–6, 2–6 (w/ Jelen)		2–6, 4–6	3–6, 6–7(2)	0–3	1–6	27–40	4
6	(Czechoslovakia) Miloslav Mečíř	6–4, 7–6(3) (w/ Jelen)	6–2, 6–4		4–6, 5–7	2–1	4–2	34–29	2
8	(Ecuador) Andrés Gómez	2–6, 3–6 (w/ Jelen)	6–3, 7–6(2)	6–4, 7–5		2–1	4–2	31–30	1

Standings are determined by: 1. number of wins; 2. number of matches; 3. in two-players-ties, head-to-head records; 4. in three-players-ties, percentage of sets won, or of games won; 5. steering-committee decision.
