= 1992 Eurocard Open =

- Date: 17–23 February
- Edition: 3rd
- Category: Championship Series
- Draw: 32S / 16D
- Prize money: $865,000
- Surface: Carpet / indoor
- Location: Stuttgart, Germany
- Venue: Hanns-Martin-Schleyer-Halle

Champions

Singles
- (Croatia) Goran Ivanišević

Doubles
- (Netherlands) Tom Nijssen / (Czechoslovakia) Cyril Suk
- Eurocard Open

The 1992 Eurocard Open was a men's ATP tennis tournament played on indoor carpet courts at the Hanns-Martin-Schleyer-Halle in Stuttgart, Germany that was part of the Championship Series of the 1992 ATP Tour. It was the third edition of the tournament and was held from 17 February until 23 February 1992. Seventh-seeded Goran Ivanišević won the singles title.

== Finals ==
=== Singles ===
(Croatia) Goran Ivanišević defeated (Sweden) Stefan Edberg, 6–7^{(5–7)}, 6–3, 6–4, 6–4

- It was Ivanišević' 1st singles title of the year and 4th of his career.

=== Doubles ===
(Netherlands) Tom Nijssen / (Czechoslovakia) Cyril Suk defeated (Australia) John Fitzgerald / (Sweden) Anders Järryd, 6–3, 6–7, 6–3
