= 1993 Eurocard Open =

- Date: 15–21 February
- Edition: 4th
- Category: Championship Series
- Draw: 32S / 16D
- Prize money: $2,125,000
- Surface: Carpet / indoor
- Location: Stuttgart, Germany
- Venue: Hanns-Martin-Schleyer-Halle

Champions

Singles
- (Germany) Michael Stich

Doubles
- (Australia) Mark Kratzmann / (Australia) Wally Masur
- Eurocard Open

The 1993 Eurocard Open was a men's ATP tennis tournament played on indoor carpet courts at the Hanns-Martin-Schleyer-Halle in Stuttgart, Germany that was part of the Championship Series of the 1993 ATP Tour. It was the fourth edition of the tournament and was held from 15 February until 21 February 1993. Sixth-seeded Michael Stich won the singles title.

== Finals ==
=== Singles ===
(Germany) Michael Stich defeated (Netherlands) Richard Krajicek, 4–6, 7–5, 7–6^{(7–4)}, 3–6, 7–5

- It was Stich's 1st singles title of the year and 8th of his career.

=== Doubles ===
(Australia) Mark Kratzmann / (Australia) Wally Masur defeated (United States) Steve DeVries / (Australia) David Macpherson, 6–3, 7–6
