= 1996 Eurocard Open =

Tennis competition

- Date: 21–27 October
- Edition: 7th (Note: This was the 6th edition of the Eurocard Open to be held in Stuttgart; the 1995 edition had been held in Essen.)
- Category: Super 9
- Draw: 48S / 24D
- Prize money: $1,950,00
- Surface: Carpet / indoor
- Location: Stuttgart, Germany
- Venue: Schleyerhalle

Champions

Singles
- (Germany) Boris Becker

Doubles
- (Canada) Sébastien Lareau / (United States) Alex O'Brien
← 1995 ·	Eurocard Open	· 1997 →

The 1996 Eurocard Open was a men's tennis tournament played on indoor carpet courts. It was the 1st edition of the Stuttgart Masters (Note: The Eurocard Open was part of the history of the Stuttgart Masters from 1996 to 1999.) and was part of the Mercedes Super 9 of the 1996 ATP Tour. It took place at the Schleyerhalle in Stuttgart, Germany from 21 October through 27 October 1996. Sixth-seeded Boris Becker won the singles title.

== Finals ==
=== Singles ===
(Germany) Boris Becker defeated (United States) Pete Sampras 3–6, 6–3, 3–6, 6–3, 6–4

- It was Becker's 4th title of the year and the 63rd of his career. It was his 1st Super 9 title of the year and his 5th overall.

=== Doubles ===
(Canada) Sébastien Lareau / (United States) Alex O'Brien defeated (Netherlands) Jacco Eltingh / (Netherlands) Paul Haarhuis 3–6, 6–4, 6–3

- It was Lareau's only title of the year and the 3rd of his career. It was O'Brien's 2nd title of the year and the 3rd of his career.

== See also ==
- Agassi–Sampras rivalry
