= 1992 Eurocard Open – Singles =

Singles
- 1992 Eurocard Open

Final
- Champion: (Croatia) Goran Ivanišević
- Runner-up: (Sweden) Stefan Edberg
- Score: 6–7^{(5–7)}, 6–3, 6–4, 6–4

Details
- Draw: 32 (3WC/4Q)
- Seeds: 8

Events
Singles	Doubles
← 1991 ·	Eurocard Open	· 1993 →

Stefan Edberg was the defending champion, but lost in the final against Goran Ivanišević. The score was 6–7^{(5–7)}, 6–3, 6–4, 6–4.

== Seeds ==
1. (United States) Jim Courier (quarterfinals)
2. (Sweden) Stefan Edberg (final)
3. (Germany) Boris Becker (second round)
4. (United States) Ivan Lendl (second round)
5. (France) Guy Forget (quarterfinals)
6. (Czechoslovakia) Petr Korda (semifinals)
7. (Croatia) Goran Ivanišević (champion)
8. (Czechoslovakia) Karel Nováček (second round)

== Draw ==
=== Key ===
- Q = Qualifier
- WC = Wild card
- LL = Lucky loser
- Alt = Alternate
- SE = Special exempt
- PR = Protected ranking
- ITF = ITF entry
- JE = Junior exempt
- w/o = Walkover
- r = Retired
- d = Defaulted
- SR = Special ranking

=== Finals ===
Semifinals
7	(Croatia) Goran Ivanišević	3	6	6
(Commonwealth of Independent States) Alexander Volkov	6	3	4
6	(Czechoslovakia) Petr Korda	4	4
2	(Sweden) Stefan Edberg	6	6

Final
7	(Croatia) Goran Ivanišević	6^{5}	6	6	6
2	(Sweden) Stefan Edberg	7^{7}	3	4	4

=== Top half ===
First round
1	(United States) J Courier	6	6
Q	(Italy) D Nargiso	3	3
(Spain) J Arrese	3	2
(Netherlands) R Krajicek	6	6
(France) O Delaître	7^{7}	3	6
(Spain) S Bruguera	6^{4}	6	1
WC	(Socialist Federal Republic of Yugoslavia) S Živojinović	3	6^{5}
7	(Croatia) G Ivanišević	6	7^{7}
4	(United States) I Lendl	7^{8}	6
(Russia) A Cherkasov	6^{6}	4
WC	(Germany) P Kühnen	6^{2}	4
(Commonwealth of Independent States) A Volkov	7^{7}	6
(Germany) CU Steeb	4	5
(Sweden) C Bergström	6	7
(Switzerland) J Hlasek	6^{5}	2
5	(France) G Forget	7^{7}	6

Second round
1	(United States) J Courier	6	3	6
(Netherlands) R Krajicek	3	6	3
(France) O Delaître	3	6^{7}
7	(Croatia) G Ivanišević	6	7^{9}
4	(United States) I Lendl	6^{4}	7	1
(Commonwealth of Independent States) A Volkov	7^{7}	5	6
(Sweden) C Bergström	6^{4}	0
5	(France) G Forget	7^{7}	6

Quarterfinals
1	(United States) J Courier	6	6^{2}	6^{8}
7	(Croatia) G Ivanišević	3	7^{7}	7^{10}
(Commonwealth of Independent States) A Volkov	6	6
5	(France) G Forget	4	4

Semifinals
7	(Croatia) G Ivanišević	3	6	6
(Commonwealth of Independent States) A Volkov	6	3	4

=== Bottom half ===
First round
6	(Czechoslovakia) P Korda	7^{10}	7
Q	(Germany) A Thoms	6^{8}	5
(United States) P McEnroe	2	0
(Sweden) A Järryd	6	6
(Sweden) M Gustafsson	1	4
(Netherlands) J Siemerink	6	6
(Sweden) J Svensson	6	5	2
3	(Germany) B Becker	4	7	6
8	(Czechoslovakia) K Nováček	3	7^{9}	6
WC	(United States) J McEnroe	6	6^{7}	2
(France) F Santoro	0	5
(Italy) O Camporese	6	7
(Croatia) G Prpić	6^{4}	2
Q	(Austria) A Antonitsch	7^{7}	6
Q	(Sweden) M Larsson	2	2
2	(Sweden) S Edberg	6	6

Second round
6	(Czechoslovakia) P Korda	6	7
(Sweden) A Järryd	3	5
(Netherlands) J Siemerink	6	6
3	(Germany) B Becker	3	4
8	(Czechoslovakia) K Nováček	3	1
(Italy) O Camporese	6	6
Q	(Austria) A Antonitsch	1	2
2	(Sweden) S Edberg	6	6

Quarterfinals
6	(Czechoslovakia) P Korda	6	6
(Netherlands) J Siemerink	4	4
(Italy) O Camporese	6	2	5
2	(Sweden) S Edberg	4	6	7

Semifinals
6	(Czechoslovakia) P Korda	4	4
2	(Sweden) S Edberg	6	6
