= 1994 Stuttgart Indoor =

1994 Eurocard Open
- Date: 14–20 February
- Edition: 5th
- Category: Championship Series
- Draw: 32S / 16D
- Prize money: $2,125,000
- Surface: Carpet / indoor
- Location: Stuttgart, Germany
- Venue: Hanns-Martin-Schleyer-Halle

Champions

Singles
- (Sweden) Stefan Edberg

Doubles
- (South Africa) David Adams (Russia) Andrei Olhovskiy
- Eurocard Open

The 1994 Stuttgart Indoor, also known as the Eurocard Open for sponsorship reasons, was a men's ATP tennis tournament played on indoor carpet courts at the Hanns-Martin-Schleyer-Halle in Stuttgart, Germany. It was the fifth edition of the tournament and was held from 14 February until 20 February 1994. Third-seeded Stefan Edberg won the singles title, his second at the event after 1991.

== Finals ==
=== Singles ===
(Sweden) Stefan Edberg defeated (Croatia) Goran Ivanišević, 4–6, 6–4, 6–2, 6–2

- It was Edberg's 2nd singles title of the year and 39th of his career.

=== Doubles ===
(South Africa) David Adams / (Russia) Andrei Olhovskiy defeated (Canada) Grant Connell / (United States) Patrick Galbraith, 6–7, 6–4, 7–6
