= 1997 Eurocard Open =

Men's tennis tournament played in Stuttgart, Germany

- Date: 20–27 October
- Edition: 2nd
- Category: ATP Super 9
- Draw: 48S / 24D
- Prize money: $2,050,00
- Surface: Carpet / indoor
- Location: Stuttgart, Germany
- Venue: Schleyerhalle

Champions

Singles
- (Czech Republic) Petr Korda

Doubles
- (Australia) Todd Woodbridge / (Australia) Mark Woodforde
← 1996 ·	Eurocard Open	· 1998 →

The 1997 Eurocard Open, also known as the Stuttgart Masters, was a men's tennis tournament played on indoor hard courts. It was the 2nd edition of the Stuttgart Masters, and was part of the ATP Super 9 of the 1997 ATP Tour. It took place at the Schleyerhalle in Stuttgart, Germany, from 20 October through 27 October 1997.

The singles field was led by first-seeded Pete Sampras. Other top seeds were Michael Chang, Patrick Rafter and Goran Ivanišević. Petr Korda, seeded 15th, won the singles title.

== Finals ==
=== Singles ===
(Czech Republic) Petr Korda defeated (Netherlands) Richard Krajicek 7–6^{(8–6)}, 6–2, 6–4,

- It was Korda's 1st title of the year and his 8th overall. It was his 1st Super 9 title of the year, and overall.

=== Doubles ===
(Australia) Todd Woodbridge / (Australia) Mark Woodforde defeated (United States) Rick Leach / (United States) Jonathan Stark 6–3, 6–3
