= 1993 Eurocard Open – Singles =

Singles
- 1993 Eurocard Open

Final
- Champion: (Germany) Michael Stich
- Runner-up: (Netherlands) Richard Krajicek
- Score: 4–6, 7–5, 7–6^{(7–4)}, 3–6, 7–5

Details
- Draw: 32 (3WC/4Q)
- Seeds: 8

Events
Singles	Doubles
← 1992 ·	Eurocard Open	· 1994 →

Goran Ivanišević was the defending champion, but did not compete this year.

Michael Stich won the title by defeating Richard Krajicek 4–6, 7–5, 7–6^{(7–4)}, 3–6, 7–5 in the final.

== Seeds ==
1. (Germany) Boris Becker (semifinals, withdrew)
2. (Czech Republic) Petr Korda (quarterfinals, withdrew)
3. (France) Guy Forget (second round)
4. (Spain) Carlos Costa (first round)
5. (Netherlands) Richard Krajicek (final)
6. (Germany) Michael Stich (champion)
7. (South Africa) Wayne Ferreira (quarterfinals)
8. (Austria) Thomas Muster (first round)

== Draw ==
=== Key ===
- Q = Qualifier
- WC = Wild card
- LL = Lucky loser
- Alt = Alternate
- SE = Special exempt
- PR = Protected ranking
- ITF = ITF entry
- JE = Junior exempt
- w/o = Walkover
- r = Retired
- d = Defaulted
- SR = Special ranking

=== Finals ===
Semifinals
1	(Germany) Boris Becker
5	(Netherlands) Richard Krajicek	w/o
6	(Germany) Michael Stich	6^{7}	6	6
(Australia) Wally Masur	7^{9}	2	2

Final
5	(Netherlands) Richard Krajicek	6	5	6^{4}	6	5
6	(Germany) Michael Stich	4	7	7^{7}	3	7

=== Top half ===
First round
1	(Germany) B Becker	6	6^{4}	6
WC	(France) H Leconte	4	7^{7}	3
Q	(Denmark) K Carlsen	6	6
(Spain) J Sánchez	4	0
(Germany) CU Steeb	6^{4}	5
(Italy) O Camporese	7^{7}	7
(France) A Boetsch	3	1^{r}
7	(South Africa) W Ferreira	6	1
4	(Spain) C Costa	6^{3}	6	6^{6}
(Sweden) M Larsson	7^{7}	3	7^{8}
Q	(Germany) M Zoecke	4	5
(Ukraine) A Medvedev	6	7
(Switzerland) J Hlasek	6	6
(Czech Republic) K Nováček	3	2
(Spain) S Bruguera	2	3
5	(Netherlands) R Krajicek	6	6

Second round
1	(Germany) B Becker	6	7^{8}
Q	(Denmark) K Carlsen	4	6^{6}
(Italy) O Camporese	7	0	3
7	(South Africa) W Ferreira	5	6	6
(Sweden) M Larsson
(Ukraine) A Medvedev	w/o
(Switzerland) J Hlasek	5	7	4
5	(Netherlands) R Krajicek	7	5	6

Quarterfinals
1	(Germany) B Becker	7^{7}	7
7	(South Africa) W Ferreira	6^{2}	5
(Ukraine) A Medvedev	4	6^{3}
5	(Netherlands) R Krajicek	6	7^{7}

Semifinals
1	(Germany) B Becker
5	(Netherlands) R Krajicek	w/o

=== Bottom half ===
First round
6	(Germany) M Stich	7	6
(Russia) A Cherkasov	5	3
Q	(Sweden) J Svensson	6^{8}	3
(Switzerland) M Rosset	7^{10}	6
Q	(Sweden) A Järryd	4	7	3
(France) C Pioline	6	5	6
(Sweden) M Gustafsson	1	4
3	(France) G Forget	6	6
8	(Austria) T Muster	2	4
WC	(Germany) P Kühnen	6	6
(Australia) W Masur	4	7	6
WC	(Germany) B Karbacher	6	5	3
(Sweden) H Holm	3	7	2
(Russia) A Volkov	6	5	6
(Spain) J Arrese	2	2
2	(Czech Republic) P Korda	6	6

Second round
6	(Germany) M Stich	7^{7}	3	7
(Switzerland) M Rosset	6^{2}	6	5
(France) C Pioline	4	6	6
3	(France) G Forget	6	3	3
WC	(Germany) P Kühnen	7^{7}	4	6^{3}
(Australia) W Masur	6^{3}	6	7^{7}
(Russia) A Volkov	6	2	4
2	(Czech Republic) P Korda	4	6	6

Quarterfinals
6	(Germany) M Stich	6	6
(France) C Pioline	4	3
(Australia) W Masur	w/o
2	(Czech Republic) P Korda

Semifinals
6	(Germany) M Stich	6^{7}	6	6
(Australia) W Masur	7^{9}	2	2
