= Aki Rahunen =

Finnish tennis player

- Country (sports): Finland
- Born: 24 December 1971 (age 54) Helsinki
- Height: 5 ft 9 in (175 cm)
- Plays: Right-handed
- Prize money: $257,054

Singles
- Career record: 31–46
- Career titles: 0
- Highest ranking: No. 57 (25 June 1990)

Grand Slam singles results
- Australian Open: 2R (1992)
- French Open: 3R (1990)
- Wimbledon: 2R (1990)
- US Open: 1R (1990)

Doubles
- Career record: 0-0
- Highest ranking: No. 981 (11 November 1988)

Aki Rahunen (born 24 December 1971) is a former professional tennis player from Finland.

== Career ==
Rahunen was the 1989 winner of the Under-18s European Junior Tennis Championships, held in Prague.

He performed well in the 1990 ATP Tour, reaching quarter finals at Stuttgart, Umag and Båstad. In Stuttgart he defeated top 50 players Javier Sánchez and Amos Mansdorf, both in straight sets. He was also a semi finalist at the Florence Open that year and reached the third round of the 1990 French Open.

In the Davis Cup he appeared in 10 singles matches for the Finnish team, with a 6–4 record. He helped Finland qualify for the World Group in 1990.

== Challenger titles ==
=== Singles: (1) ===
No.	Year	Tournament	Surface	Opponent in the final	Score in the final
1.	1989	Hanko, Finland	Clay	(Soviet Union) Andres Võsand	6–2, 6–0

== See also ==
- List of Finland Davis Cup team representatives
