= 1990 Ebel U.S. Pro Indoor =

- Date: February 19–25
- Edition: 23rd
- Category: ATP Championship Series
- Draw: 48S / 24D
- Prize money: $825,000
- Surface: Carpet / indoor
- Location: Philadelphia, PA, U.S.
- Venue: Spectrum

Champions

Singles
- (United States) Pete Sampras

Doubles
- (United States) Rick Leach / (United States) Jim Pugh
- U.S. Pro Indoor

The 1990 U.S. Pro Indoor (known as the Ebel U.S. Pro Indoor in 1990 for sponsorship reasons) was a men's tennis tournament played on indoor carpet courts. It was the 23rd edition of the event known that year as the Ebel U.S. Pro Indoor, and was part of the ATP Championship Series, double-week events of the 1990 ATP Tour, running concurrently with the 1990 Eurocard Classic. It took place at the Spectrum in Philadelphia, Pennsylvania, United States, from February 19 to February 25, 1990. Pete Sampras, who was seeded 13th, won the singles title.

== Finals ==
=== Singles ===
(United States) Pete Sampras defeated (Ecuador) Andrés Gómez, 7–6^{(7–4)}, 7–5, 6–2

- It was Sampras' first singles title of his career.

=== Doubles ===
(United States) Rick Leach / (United States) Jim Pugh defeated (Canada) Grant Connell / (Canada) Glenn Michibata, 3–6, 6–4, 6–2

- It was Leach's first title of the year, and the 16th of his career. It was Pugh's first title of the year, and the 16th of his career.
