= 1997 Eurocard Open – Singles =

Singles
- 1997 Eurocard Open

Final
- Champion: (Czech Republic) Petr Korda
- Runner-up: (Netherlands) Richard Krajicek
- Score: 7–6^{(8–6)}, 6–2, 6–4

Details
- Draw: 48
- Seeds: 16

Events
Singles	Doubles
← 1996 ·	Eurocard Open	· 1998 →

Petr Korda defeated Richard Krajicek in the final, 7–6^{(8–6)}, 6–2, 6–4 to win the singles tennis title at the 1997 Eurocard Open.

Boris Becker was the defending champion, but was defeated by Krajicek in the second round.

== Seeds ==
A champion seed is indicated in bold text while text in italics indicates the round in which that seed was eliminated. All sixteen seeds received a bye into the second round.

1. (United States) Pete Sampras (third round)
2. (United States) Michael Chang (second round)
3. (Australia) Patrick Rafter (semifinals)
4. (Croatia) Goran Ivanišević (second round)
5. (United Kingdom) Greg Rusedski (second round)
6. (Spain) Carlos Moyá (second round)
7. (Russia) Yevgeny Kafelnikov (third round)
8. (Spain) Sergi Bruguera (second round)
9. (Chile) Marcelo Ríos (quarterfinals)
10. (Spain) Álex Corretja (second round)
11. (Brazil) Gustavo Kuerten (third round)
12. (Austria) Thomas Muster (second round)
13. (Sweden) Jonas Björkman (semifinals)
14. (Spain) Félix Mantilla (second round)
15. (Czech Republic) **Petr Korda (champion)**
16. (Netherlands) Richard Krajicek (final)

== Draw ==
=== Key ===
- Q = Qualifier
- WC = Wild card
- LL = Lucky loser
- Alt = Alternate
- SE = Special exempt
- PR = Protected ranking
- ITF = ITF entry
- JE = Junior exempt
- w/o = Walkover
- r = Retired
- d = Defaulted
- SR = Special ranking

=== Finals ===
Quarterfinals
16	**(Netherlands) Richard Krajicek**	**6**	**7**
(Sweden) Magnus Larsson	2	5
13	**(Sweden) Jonas Björkman**	**6**	**6**
WC	(Germany) Nicolas Kiefer	4	2
LL	(United States) Todd Martin	**6**	6^{7}	4
3	**(Australia) Patrick Rafter**	4	**7^{9}**	**6**
9	(Chile) Marcelo Ríos	3	4
15	**(Czech Republic) Petr Korda**	**6**	**6**

Semifinals
16	(Netherlands) **Richard Krajicek**	**6**	3	**6**
13	(Sweden) Jonas Björkman	4	**6**	3
3	(Australia) Patrick Rafter	4	6^{3}
15	(Czech Republic) **Petr Korda**	**6**	**7^{7}**

Final
16	(Netherlands) Richard Krajicek	6^{6}	2	4
15	(Czech Republic) **Petr Korda**	**7^{8}**	**6**	**6**

=== Top half ===
==== Section 1 ====
First round
(Spain) A Portas	1	1
(Sweden) **M Gustafsson**	**6**	**6**
(Germany) **B Becker**	**6**	**6**
(Germany) M-K Goellner	2	4
(Australia) T Woodbridge	2	3
(Sweden) **M Larsson**	**6**	**6**
(France) **F Santoro**	**7^{8}**	**6**
(Australia) M Philippoussis	6^{6}	1

Second round
1	(United States) **P Sampras**	**6**	**6**
(Sweden) M Gustafsson	3	4
(Germany) B Becker	6^{10}	4
16	(Netherlands) **R Krajicek**	**7^{12}**	**6**
10	(Spain) Á Corretja	2	6^{5}
(Sweden) **M Larsson**	**6**	**7^{7}**
(France) **F Santoro**	**7**	**7^{11}**
8	(Spain) S Bruguera	5	6^{9}

Third round
1	(United States) P Sampras	4	4
16	(Netherlands) **R Krajicek**	**6**	**6**
(Sweden) **M Larsson**	**6**	**7**
(France) F Santoro	3	5

Quarterfinals
16	(Netherlands) **R Krajicek**	**6**	**7**
(Sweden) M Larsson	2	5

==== Section 2 ====
First round
WC	(Germany) T Haas	5	**6**	4
(United Kingdom) **T Henman**	**7**	3	**6**
Q	(Netherlands) S Schalken	4	2
(Netherlands) **J Siemerink**	**6**	**6**
(Belgium) F Dewulf	**6**	1	3
Q	(Netherlands) **P Haarhuis**	4	**6**	**6**
WC	(Germany) **N Kiefer**	**6**	3	**6**
(Sweden) T Johansson	3	**6**	1

Second round
4	(Croatia) G Ivanišević	3	0	r
(United Kingdom) **T Henman**	**6**	**2**
(Netherlands) J Siemerink	3	4
13	(Sweden) **J Björkman**	**6**	**6**
12	(Austria) T Muster	2	**7^{7}**	2
Q	(Netherlands) **P Haarhuis**	**6**	6^{3}	**6**
WC	(Germany) **N Kiefer**	5	**6**	**6**
5	(United Kingdom) G Rusedski	**7**	2	4

Third round
(United Kingdom) T Henman	2	**6**	3
13	(Sweden) **J Björkman**	**6**	3	**6**
Q	(Netherlands) P Haarhuis	**7^{7}**	6^{3}	5
WC	(Germany) **N Kiefer**	6^{5}	**7^{7}**	**7**

Quarterfinals
13	(Sweden) **J Björkman**	**6**	**6**
WC	(Germany) N Kiefer	4	2

=== Bottom half ===
==== Section 3 ====
First round
LL	(United States) **T Martin**	**6**	**6**
(United States) A Agassi	4	4
Q	(United States) A O'Brien	3	**6**	3
(Morocco) **H Arazi**	**6**	2	**6**
Q	(Germany) **D Prinosil**	5	**6**	**6**
(Switzerland) M Rosset	**7**	4	2
(Spain) A Berasategui	1	4
(Sweden) **T Enqvist**	**6**	**6**

Second round
6	(Spain) C Moyà	3	6^{2}
LL	(United States) **T Martin**	**6**	**7^{7}**
(Morocco) H Arazi	3	**7^{7}**	3
11	(Brazil) **G Kuerten**	**6**	6^{1}	**6**
14	(Spain) F Mantilla	5	4
Q	(Germany) **D Prinosil**	**7**	**6**
(Sweden) T Enqvist
3	(Australia) **P Rafter**	**w/o**

Third round
LL	(United States) **T Martin**	**6**	**6**
11	(Brazil) G Kuerten	3	4
Q	(Germany) D Prinosil	**6**	2	1
3	(Australia) **P Rafter**	3	**6**	**6**

Quarterfinals
LL	(United States) T Martin	**6**	6^{7}	4
3	(Australia) **P Rafter**	4	**7^{9}**	**6**

==== Section 4 ====
First round
Q	(Australia) P Cash	2	0
(Ukraine) **A Medvedev**	**6**	**6**
(Australia) M Woodforde	**6**	4	6^{3}
(Slovakia) **K Kučera**	4	**6**	**7^{7}**
(United States) **C Woodruff**	**6**	**0**
(Czech Republic) B Ulihrach	3	1	r
(France) **C Pioline**	**7**	4	**6**
Q	(United States) J Tarango	5	**6**	4

Second round
7	(Russia) **Y Kafelnikov**	**6**	2	**6**
(Ukraine) A Medvedev	0	**6**	4
(Slovakia) K Kučera	**7^{9}**	4	4
9	(Chile) **M Ríos**	6^{7}	**6**	**6**
15	(Czech Republic) **P Korda**	**6**	**6**
(United States) C Woodruff	3	3
(France) **C Pioline**	**7**	1	**6**
2	(United States) M Chang	5	**6**	4

Third round
7	(Russia) Y Kafelnikov	6^{6}	3
9	(Chile) **M Ríos**	**7^{8}**	**6**
15	(Czech Republic) **P Korda**	**6**
(France) C Pioline	3	r

Quarterfinals
9	(Chile) M Ríos	3	4
15	(Czech Republic) **P Korda**	**6**	**6**
