= 1993 Eurocard Open – Doubles =

Doubles
- 1993 Eurocard Open

Final
- Champions: (Australia) Mark Kratzmann (Australia) Wally Masur
- Runners-up: (United States) Steve DeVries (Australia) David Macpherson
- Score: 6–3, 7–6

Details
- Draw: 16
- Seeds: 4

Events
Singles	Doubles
- Eurocard Open

Tom Nijssen and Cyril Suk were the defending champions, but lost in the first round to Mark Kratzmann and Wally Masur.

Kratzmann and Masur won the title by defeating Steve DeVries and David Macpherson 6–3, 7–6 in the final.

== Seeds ==
1. (Australia) John Fitzgerald / (Sweden) Anders Järryd (quarterfinals)
2. (United States) Kelly Jones / (United States) Rick Leach (first round)
3. (South Africa) Danie Visser / (Australia) Laurie Warder (first round)
4. (Australia) Mark Kratzmann / (Australia) Wally Masur (champions)

== Draw ==
Key

- Q = Qualifier
- WC = Wild card
- LL = Lucky loser
- Alt = Alternate
- ITF = ITF entry
- PR = Protected ranking
- SR = Special ranking
- SE = Special exempt
- JE = Junior exempt
- JR = Junior Accelerator Programme entrant
- CO = College Accelerator Programme entrant
- NG = Next Gen Accelerator Program entrant
- w/o = Walkover
- r = Retired
- d = Defaulted

=== Draw ===
First round
1	(Australia) J Fitzgerald (Sweden) A Järryd	7	6
WC	(Czech Republic) K Nováček (Germany) CU Steeb	6	1
(United States) L Jensen (South Africa) G Muller	4	4
(France) G Forget (Germany) M Stich	6	6
4	(Australia) M Kratzmann (Australia) W Masur	7	6
(Netherlands) T Nijssen (Czech Republic) C Suk	5	1
(Canada) G Connell (United States) P Galbraith	6	7
Q	(Netherlands) HJ Davids (Czech Republic) L Pimek	1	5
(United States) S DeVries (Australia) D Macpherson	4	6	7
(South Africa) D Adams (Russia) A Olhovskiy	6	2	6
(South Africa) W Ferreira (South Africa) P Norval	6	7
3	(South Africa) D Visser (Australia) L Warder	3	5
WC	(Germany) B Becker (Germany) P Kühnen	6	6
(South Africa) B Talbot (United States) T Witsken	4	3
(Switzerland) J Hlasek (Italy) D Nargiso	6	6
2	(United States) K Jones (United States) R Leach	4	3

Quarterfinals
1	(Australia) J Fitzgerald (Sweden) A Järryd	6	3	3
(France) G Forget (Germany) M Stich	0	6	6
4	(Australia) M Kratzmann (Australia) W Masur	6	6
(Canada) G Connell (United States) P Galbraith	3	4
(United States) S DeVries (Australia) D Macpherson	4	6	7
(South Africa) W Ferreira (South Africa) P Norval	6	3	5
WC	(Germany) B Becker (Germany) P Kühnen	6	6
(Switzerland) J Hlasek (Italy) D Nargiso	3	3

Semifinals
(France) G Forget (Germany) M Stich	4	6
4	(Australia) M Kratzmann (Australia) W Masur	6	7
(United States) S DeVries (Australia) D Macpherson	w/o
WC	(Germany) B Becker (Germany) P Kühnen

Final
4	(Australia) M Kratzmann (Australia) W Masur	6	7
(United States) S DeVries (Australia) D Macpherson	3	6
