= 1995 Eurocard Open (February) =

- Date: 20–26 February
- Edition: 6th
- Category: Championship Series
- Draw: 32S / 16D
- Prize money: $2,125,000
- Surface: Carpet / indoor
- Location: Stuttgart, Germany
- Venue: Hanns-Martin-Schleyer-Halle

Champions

Singles
- (Netherlands) Richard Krajicek

Doubles
- (Canada) Grant Connell / (United States) Patrick Galbraith
- Eurocard Open

The 1995 Eurocard Open was a men's ATP tennis tournament played on indoor carpet courts at the Hanns-Martin-Schleyer-Halle in Stuttgart, Germany that was part of the Championship Series of the 1995 ATP Tour. It was the sixth edition of the tournament and was held from 20 February until 26 February 1995. Unseeded Richard Krajicek won the singles title.

== Finals ==
=== Singles ===
(Netherlands) Richard Krajicek defeated (Germany) Michael Stich 7–6^{(7–4)}, 6–3, 6–7^{(6–8)}, 1–6, 6–3

- It was Krajicek's 1st singles title of the year and 8th of his career.

=== Doubles ===
(Canada) Grant Connell / (United States) Patrick Galbraith defeated (Czech Republic) Cyril Suk / (Czech Republic) Daniel Vacek 6–2, 6–2
