= 1996 Eurocard Open – Singles =

Singles
- 1996 Eurocard Open

Final
- Champion: (Germany) Boris Becker
- Runner-up: (United States) Pete Sampras
- Score: 3–6, 6–3, 3–6, 6–3, 6–4

Details
- Draw: 48
- Seeds: 16

Events
Singles	Doubles
← 1995 ·	Eurocard Open	· 1997 →

Boris Becker defeated Pete Sampras in the final, 3–6, 6–3, 3–6, 6–3, 6–4 to win the singles tennis title at the 1996 Eurocard Open.

Thomas Muster was the defending champion, but lost in the second round to Mark Woodforde.

== Seeds ==
A champion seed is indicated in bold text while text in italics indicates the round in which that seed was eliminated. All sixteen seeds received a bye into the second round.

1. (United States) Pete Sampras (final)
2. (United States) Michael Chang (semifinals)
3. (Austria) Thomas Muster (second round)
4. (Russia) Yevgeny Kafelnikov (second round)
5. (Croatia) Goran Ivanišević (quarterfinals)
6. (Germany) **Boris Becker (champion)**
7. (South Africa) Wayne Ferreira (second round)
8. (Netherlands) Richard Krajicek (third round)
9. (United States) Andre Agassi (quarterfinals)
10. (Chile) Marcelo Ríos (quarterfinals)
11. (United States) Todd Martin (third round)
12. (Sweden) Thomas Enqvist (third round)
13. (United States) MaliVai Washington (second round)
14. (Spain) Albert Costa (second round)
15. (United States) Jim Courier (third round)
16. (Spain) Félix Mantilla (third round)

== Draw ==
=== Key ===
- Q = Qualifier
- WC = Wild card
- LL = Lucky loser
- Alt = Alternate
- SE = Special exempt
- PR = Protected ranking
- ITF = ITF entry
- JE = Junior exempt
- w/o = Walkover
- r = Retired
- d = Defaulted
- SR = Special ranking

=== Finals ===
Quarterfinals
1	**(United States) Pete Sampras**	**6**	**6**
9	(United States) Andre Agassi	4	1
**(Netherlands) Jan Siemerink**	**6**	**7^{7}**
5	(Croatia) Goran Ivanišević	3	6^{4}
6	**(Germany) Boris Becker**	**6**	**6**
(Sweden) Magnus Gustafsson	2	2
10	(Chile) Marcelo Ríos	4	3
2	**(United States) Michael Chang**	**6**	**6**

Semifinals
1	(United States) **Pete Sampras**	**6**	**6**
(Netherlands) Jan Siemerink	3	4
6	(Germany) **Boris Becker**	**6**	**6**
2	(United States) Michael Chang	4	3

Final
1	(United States) Pete Sampras	**6**	3	**6**	3	4
6	(Germany) **Boris Becker**	3	**6**	3	**6**	**6**

=== Top half ===
==== Section 1 ====
First round
Q	(Armenia) **S Sargsian**	**7**	**6**
(Australia) M Philippoussis	5	3
Q	(United States) A O'Brien	6^{5}	3
(Switzerland) **M Rosset**	**7^{7}**	**6**
WC	(Germany) C-U Steeb	5	5
(Spain) **A Berasategui**	**7**	**7**
(Spain) F Clavet	1	4
(United States) **R Reneberg**	**6**	**6**

Second round
1	(United States) **P Sampras**	**6**	**6**
Q	(Armenia) S Sargsian	3	4
(Switzerland) M Rosset	6^{3}	**6**	5
16	(Spain) **F Mantilla**	**7^{7}**	3	**7**
9	(United States) **A Agassi**	**6**	**7^{7}**
(Spain) A Berasategui	1	6^{5}
(United States) **R Reneberg**	**6**	**7**
7	(South Africa) W Ferreira	3	5

Third round
1	(United States) **P Sampras**	**6**	**6**
16	(Spain) F Mantilla	1	4
9	(United States) **A Agassi**	**6**	**6**
(United States) R Reneberg	2	4

Quarterfinals
1	(United States) **P Sampras**	**6**	**6**
9	(United States) A Agassi	4	1

==== Section 2 ====
First round
WC	(Germany) H Dreekmann	1	5
(Netherlands) **J Siemerink**	**6**	**7**
(Italy) **R Furlan**	**6**	**6**
LL	(Belgium) F Dewulf	4	1
(Germany) **M Stich**	**7**	**6**
(Netherlands) P Haarhuis	5	1
(Sweden) **S Edberg**	**6**	**6**
(United Kingdom) T Henman	4	2

Second round
4	(Russia) Y Kafelnikov	**6**	3	6^{5}
(Netherlands) **J Siemerink**	3	**6**	**7^{7}**
(Italy) **R Furlan**	**6**	**7**
13	(United States) M Washington	4	5
11	(United States) **T Martin**	**7^{7}**	**7**
(Germany) M Stich	6^{5}	5
(Sweden) S Edberg	6^{7}	3
5	(Croatia) **G Ivanišević**	**7^{9}**	**6**

Third round
(Netherlands) **J Siemerink**	**6**	**6**
(Italy) R Furlan	4	4
11	(United States) T Martin	2	4
5	(Croatia) **G Ivanišević**	**6**	**6**

Quarterfinals
(Netherlands) **J Siemerink**	**6**	**7^{7}**
5	(Croatia) G Ivanišević	3	6^{4}

=== Bottom half ===
==== Section 3 ====
First round
(Spain) C Moyá	3	4
Q	(United Kingdom) **G Rusedski**	**6**	**6**
(Argentina) H Gumy	3	0
Q	(Germany) **N Kiefer**	**6**	**6**
(Sweden) **M Gustafsson**	**6**	**6**
(Australia) J Stoltenberg	4	4
Q	(Germany) M-K Goellner	4	1
(Australia) **M Woodforde**	**6**	**6**

Second round
6	(Germany) **B Becker**	**6**	**6**
Q	(United Kingdom) G Rusedski	4	4
Q	(Germany) N Kiefer	4	4
12	(Sweden) **T Enqvist**	**6**	**6**
14	(Spain) A Costa	6^{5}	6^{1}
(Sweden) **M Gustafsson**	**7^{7}**	**7^{7}**
(Australia) **M Woodforde**	3	**6**	**3**
3	(Austria) T Muster	**6**	1	0/r

Third round
6	(Germany) **B Becker**	**6**	**7**
12	(Sweden) T Enqvist	4	5
(Sweden) **M Gustafsson**	6^{3}	**6**	**7^{7}**
(Australia) M Woodforde	**7^{7}**	2	6^{4}

Quarterfinals
6	(Germany) **B Becker**	**6**	**6**
(Sweden) M Gustafsson	2	2

==== Section 4 ====
First round
WC	(Germany) A Rădulescu	**7^{7}**	6^{3}	4
(France) **A Boetsch**	6^{1}	**7^{7}**	**6**
Q	(Canada) **S Lareau**	**7**	**6**
WC	(Spain) S Bruguera	5	0
(Spain) À Corretja	3	1
(Czech Republic) **B Ulihrach**	**6**	**6**
(Australia) **T Woodbridge**	4	**6**	**6**
(Czech Republic) D Vacek	**6**	4	1

Second round
8	(Netherlands) **R Krajicek**	4	**6**	**6**
(France) A Boetsch	**6**	3	2
Q	(Canada) S Lareau	**7^{7}**	6^{4}	4
10	(Chile) **M Ríos**	6^{4}	**7^{7}**	**6**
15	(United States) **J Courier**	**7^{7}**	**6**
(Czech Republic) B Ulihrach	6^{5}	4
(Australia) T Woodbridge	3	2
2	(United States) **M Chang**	**6**	**6**

Third round
8	(Netherlands) R Krajicek	4	4
10	(Chile) **M Ríos**	**6**	**6**
15	(United States) J Courier	5	2
2	(United States) **M Chang**	**7**	**6**

Quarterfinals
10	(Chile) M Ríos	4	3
2	(United States) **M Chang**	**6**	**6**
