= 1990 Ebel U.S. Pro Indoor – Doubles =

Doubles
- 1990 Ebel U.S. Pro Indoor

Final
- Champions: (United States) Rick Leach (United States) Jim Pugh
- Runners-up: (Canada) Grant Connell (Canada) Glenn Michibata
- Score: 3–6, 6–4, 6–2

Events
Singles	Doubles
← 1989 ·	Ebel U.S. Pro Indoor	· 1991 →

Paul Annacone and Christo van Rensburg were the defending champions. Annacone participated with John Fitzgerald, and lost in the quarterfinals to Scott Davis and David Pate, while Van Rensburg played with Kevin Curren, and lost in the semifinals to Grant Connell and Glenn Michibata.
Rick Leach and Jim Pugh defeated Connell and Michibata 3–6, 6–4, 6–2, in the final.

== Seeds ==
All seeds receive a bye into the second round.

1. (South Africa) Pieter Aldrich / (South Africa) Danie Visser (quarterfinals)
2. (United States) Rick Leach / (United States) Jim Pugh (champions)
3. (United States) Paul Annacone / (Australia) John Fitzgerald (quarterfinals)
4. (United States) Kevin Curren / (South Africa) Christo van Rensburg (semifinals)
5. (United States) Scott Davis / (United States) David Pate (semifinals)
6. (Australia) Darren Cahill / (Australia) Mark Kratzmann (second round)
7. (United States) Jim Courier / (United States) Pete Sampras (second round)
8. (Canada) Grant Connell / (Canada) Glenn Michibata (final)

== Draw ==
=== Key ===
- Q = Qualifier
- WC = Wild card
- LL = Lucky loser
- Alt = Alternate
- SE = Special exempt
- PR = Protected ranking
- ITF = ITF entry
- JE = Junior exempt
- w/o = Walkover
- r = Retired
- d = Defaulted
- SR = Special ranking

=== Finals ===
Semifinals
8	(Canada) Grant Connell (Canada) Glenn Michibata	5	6	6
5	(United States) Scott Davis (United States) David Pate	7	2	4
4	(United States) Kevin Curren (South Africa) Christo van Rensburg	6	6
2	(United States) Rick Leach (United States) Jim Pugh	7	7

Final
8	(Canada) Grant Connell (Canada) Glenn Michibata	6	4	2
2	(United States) Rick Leach (United States) Jim Pugh	3	6	6

=== Top half ===
First round
(Sweden) R Båthman (United States) D Wheaton	6	4	7^{10}
(United States) K Flach (Mexico) L Lavalle	4	6	6^{8}
(Czechoslovakia) P Korda (Czechoslovakia) M Šrejber	4	7	2
(United States) G Layendecker (United States) R Reneberg	6	5	6
(United States) B Willenborg (Peru) J Yzaga	2	6^{5}
(Netherlands) P Haarhuis (Netherlands) M Schapers	6	7^{7}
(New Zealand) K Evernden (Australia) W Masur	7^{7}	7
(France) J-P Fleurian (The Bahamas) R Smith	6^{2}	5

Second round
1	(South Africa) P Aldrich (South Africa) D Visser	7^{7}	6
(Sweden) R Båthman (United States) D Wheaton	6^{2}	2
(United States) G Layendecker (United States) R Reneberg	3	7	4
8	(Canada) G Connell (Canada) G Michibata	6	5	6
3	(United States) P Annacone (Australia) J Fitzgerald	6	6
(Netherlands) P Haarhuis (Netherlands) M Schapers	4	3
(New Zealand) K Evernden (Australia) W Masur	4	6	1
5	(United States) S Davis (United States) D Pate	6	3	6

Quarterfinals
1	(South Africa) P Aldrich (South Africa) D Visser	3	4
8	(Canada) G Connell (Canada) G Michibata	6	6
3	(United States) P Annacone (Australia) J Fitzgerald	5	7^{9}	3
5	(United States) S Davis (United States) D Pate	7	6^{7}	6

Semifinals
8	(Canada) G Connell (Canada) G Michibata	5	6	6
5	(United States) S Davis (United States) D Pate	7	2	4

=== Bottom half ===
First round
(United States) S Cannon (United States) G Van Emburgh	6^{4}	0
(Mexico) J Lozano (United States) T Witsken	7^{7}	6
(United States) M Davis (United States) R Van't Hof	4	6	7^{11}
(United States) B Gilbert (United States) L Shiras	6	2	6^{9}
(United States) P Chamberlin (United States) T Wilkison	6	6
(United States) J Berger (United States) D Rostagno	2	4
(South Africa) N Broad (South Africa) G Muller	6	6
(United States) S DeVries (United States) D Goldie	2	4

Second round
6	(Australia) D Cahill (Australia) M Kratzmann	5	6	6^{4}
(Mexico) J Lozano (United States) T Witsken	7	3	7^{7}
(United States) M Davis (United States) R Van't Hof	4	6	3
4	(United States) K Curren (South Africa) C van Rensburg	6	3	6
7	(United States) J Courier (United States) P Sampras	4	2
(United States) P Chamberlin (United States) T Wilkison	6	6
(South Africa) N Broad (South Africa) G Muller	4	6	3
2	(United States) R Leach (United States) J Pugh	6	3	6

Quarterfinals
(Mexico) J Lozano (United States) T Witsken	3	6	6^{4}
4	(United States) K Curren (South Africa) C van Rensburg	6	3	7^{7}
(United States) P Chamberlin (United States) T Wilkison	2	4
2	(United States) R Leach (United States) J Pugh	6	6

Semifinals
4	(United States) K Curren (South Africa) C van Rensburg	6	6
2	(United States) R Leach (United States) J Pugh	7	7
