= 1997 Eurocard Open – Doubles =

Doubles
- 1997 Eurocard Open

Final
- Champions: (Australia) Todd Woodbridge (Australia) Mark Woodforde
- Runners-up: (United States) Rick Leach (United States) Jonathan Stark
- Score: 6–3, 6–3

Events
Singles	Doubles
← 1996 ·	Eurocard Open	· 1998 →

Sébastien Lareau and Alex O'Brien were the defending champions, but lost in semifinals to Todd Woodbridge and Mark Woodforde.

Todd Woodbridge and Mark Woodforde won the title by defeating Rick Leach and Jonathan Stark 6–3, 6–3 in the final.

== Seeds ==
All seeds received a bye into the second round.

1. (Australia) Todd Woodbridge / (Australia) Mark Woodforde (champions)
2. (Netherlands) Jacco Eltingh / (Netherlands) Paul Haarhuis (semifinals)
3. (Russia) Yevgeny Kafelnikov / (Czech Republic) Daniel Vacek (second round)
4. (Canada) Sébastien Lareau / (United States) Alex O'Brien (semifinals)
5. (India) Mahesh Bhupathi / (India) Leander Paes (quarterfinals)
6. (United States) Rick Leach / (United States) Jonathan Stark (final)
7. (South Africa) Ellis Ferreira / (United States) Patrick Galbraith (second round)
8. (The Bahamas) Mark Knowles / (Canada) Daniel Nestor (quarterfinals)

== Draw ==
=== Key ===
- Q = Qualifier
- WC = Wild card
- LL = Lucky loser
- Alt = Alternate
- ITF = ITF entry
- PR = Protected ranking
- SR = Special ranking
- SE = Special exempt
- JE = Junior exempt
- JR = Junior Accelerator Programme entrant
- CO = College Accelerator Programme entrant
- NG = Next Gen Accelerator Program entrant
- w/o = Walkover
- r = Retired
- d = Defaulted

=== Finals ===
Semifinals
1	(Australia) Todd Woodbridge (Australia) Mark Woodforde	7	7
4	(Canada) Sébastien Lareau (United States) Alex O'Brien	5	5
6	(United States) Rick Leach (United States) Jonathan Stark	7	6
2	(Netherlands) Jacco Eltingh (Netherlands) Paul Haarhuis	6	4

Finals
1	(Australia) Todd Woodbridge (Australia) Mark Woodforde	6	6
6	(United States) Rick Leach (United States) Jonathan Stark	3	3

=== Top half ===
First round
(Zimbabwe) W Black (United States) J Grabb	6	6
(United Kingdom) N Broad (South Africa) P Norval	3	4
(Sweden) J Björkman (Sweden) P Nyborg	3	6	6
(Russia) A Olhovskiy (Czech Republic) P Vízner	6	4	4
WC	(United States) A Agassi (United States) T Martin	4	2
(United States) D Johnson (United States) F Montana	6	6
LL	(Australia) J Eagle (Australia) A Florent	6	5
WC	(Germany) B Becker (Germany) MK Goellner	7	7

Second round
1	(Australia) T Woodbridge (Australia) M Woodforde	6	6
(Zimbabwe) W Black (United States) J Grabb	4	3
(Sweden) J Björkman (Sweden) P Nyborg	6	3	1
8	(The Bahamas) M Knowles (Canada) D Nestor	4	6	6
4	(Canada) S Lareau (United States) A O'Brien	6	6
(United States) D Johnson (United States) F Montana	3	4
WC	(Germany) B Becker (Germany) MK Goellner	5	7	6
5	(India) M Bhupathi (India) L Paes	7	6	7

Quarterfinals
1	(Australia) T Woodbridge (Australia) M Woodforde	6	3	6
8	(The Bahamas) M Knowles (Canada) D Nestor	4	6	2
4	(Canada) S Lareau (United States) A O'Brien	5	7	7
5	(India) M Bhupathi (India) L Paes	7	6	5

Semifinals
1	(Australia) T Woodbridge (Australia) M Woodforde	7	7
4	(Canada) S Lareau (United States) A O'Brien	5	5

=== Bottom half ===
First round
WC	(United Kingdom) T Henman (Australia) P Rafter	6	6
(Germany) K Braasch (Netherlands) M Oosting	4	2
(Argentina) P Albano (Brazil) G Kuerten	4	6	3
(North Macedonia) A Kitinov (Belgium) L Pimek	6	2	6
WC	(Germany) N Kiefer (Germany) D Prinosil	6	3	5
(Spain) T Carbonell (Spain) F Roig	1	6	7
(South Africa) D Adams (Czech Republic) C Suk	6	6
(United States) T Kronemann (Australia) D Macpherson	4	3

Second round
6	(United States) R Leach (United States) J Stark	6	6
WC	(United Kingdom) T Henman (Australia) P Rafter	4	2
(North Macedonia) A Kitinov (Belgium) L Pimek	7	6
3	(Russia) Y Kafelnikov (Czech Republic) D Vacek	5	2
7	(South Africa) E Ferreira (United States) P Galbraith	6	6
(Spain) T Carbonell (Spain) F Roig	7	7
(South Africa) D Adams (Czech Republic) C Suk	6	3
2	(Netherlands) J Eltingh (Netherlands) P Haarhuis	7	6

Quarterfinals
6	(United States) R Leach (United States) J Stark	6	6
(North Macedonia) A Kitinov (Belgium) L Pimek	4	1
(Spain) T Carbonell (Spain) F Roig	6	4	3
2	(Netherlands) J Eltingh (Netherlands) P Haarhuis	3	6	6

Semifinals
6	(United States) R Leach (United States) J Stark	7	6
2	(Netherlands) J Eltingh (Netherlands) P Haarhuis	6	4
