= 1990 Eurocard Classics – Singles =

Singles
- 1990 Eurocard Classics
- no Champion: first event

Final
- Champion: (West Germany) Boris Becker
- Runner-up: (Czechoslovakia) Ivan Lendl
- Score: 6–2, 6–2

Details
- Draw: 32
- Seeds: 8

Events
Singles	Doubles
Eurocard Open	· 1991 →

It was the first edition of the Eurocard Classics. Boris Becker won the inaugural singles title, defeating Ivan Lendl 6–2, 6–2 in the final.

== Seeds ==
1. (Czechoslovakia) Ivan Lendl (final)
2. (West Germany) Boris Becker (champion)
3. (France) Yannick Noah (second round)
4. (West Germany) Carl-Uwe Steeb (first round)
5. (Spain) Emilio Sánchez (second round)
6. (Austria) Horst Skoff (quarterfinals)
7. (Austria) Thomas Muster (first round)
8. (Haiti) Ronald Agénor (first round)

== Draw ==
=== Key ===
- Q = Qualifier
- WC = Wild card
- LL = Lucky loser
- Alt = Alternate
- SE = Special exempt
- PR = Protected ranking
- ITF = ITF entry
- JE = Junior exempt
- w/o = Walkover
- r = Retired
- d = Defaulted
- SR = Special ranking

=== Finals ===
Semifinals
1	(Czechoslovakia) Ivan Lendl	6	6^{5}	6
(Sweden) Magnus Gustafsson	4	7^{7}	3
(Sweden) Jonas Svensson	5	2
2	(West Germany) Boris Becker	7	6

Final
1	(Czechoslovakia) Ivan Lendl	2	2
2	(West Germany) Boris Becker	6	6

=== Top half ===
First round
1	(Czechoslovakia) I Lendl	6	6
(Italy) O Camporese	4	2
(Czechoslovakia) K Nováček	3	6	4
(Socialist Federal Republic of Yugoslavia) G Prpić	6	4	6
(Czechoslovakia) M Střelba	7	6
(Spain) J Arrese	5	3
WC	(West Germany) P Kühnen	4	7^{7}	6
7	(Austria) T Muster	6	6^{1}	1
4	(West Germany) C-U Steeb	2	1
(Israel) A Mansdorf	6	6
Q	(Finland) A Rahunen	7^{7}	6
(Spain) J Sánchez	6^{4}	3
(Sweden) M Gustafsson	4	7^{10}	6
(Socialist Federal Republic of Yugoslavia) G Ivanišević	6	6^{8}	4
(Sweden) J Gunnarsson	4	1
5	(Spain) E Sánchez	6	6

Second round
1	(Czechoslovakia) I Lendl	7	6
(Socialist Federal Republic of Yugoslavia) G Prpić	5	4
(Czechoslovakia) M Střelba	1	2
WC	(West Germany) P Kühnen	6	6
(Israel) A Mansdorf	2	4
Q	(Finland) A Rahunen	6	6
(Sweden) M Gustafsson	6	6
5	(Spain) E Sánchez	3	0

Quarterfinals
1	(Czechoslovakia) I Lendl	6	6
WC	(West Germany) P Kühnen	3	3
Q	(Finland) A Rahunen	7^{10}	1	2
(Sweden) M Gustafsson	6^{8}	6	6

Semifinals
1	(Czechoslovakia) I Lendl	6	6^{5}	6
(Sweden) M Gustafsson	4	7^{7}	3

=== Bottom half ===
First round
6	(Austria) H Skoff	6	3	6
Q	(West Germany) M Zoecke	4	6	3
Q	(Sweden) T Högstedt	6	2	6
(West Germany) E Jelen	4	6	2
(Sweden) J Svensson	7^{7}	7
WC	(West Germany) M Stich	6^{3}	5
(France) G Forget	4	6^{4}
3	(France) Y Noah	6	7^{7}
8	(Haiti) R Agénor	5	4
(Czechoslovakia) M Mečíř	7	6
(Switzerland) J Hlasek	4	5
(Italy) P Canè	6	7
(Soviet Union) A Volkov	6	7
WC	(Socialist Federal Republic of Yugoslavia) S Živojinović	3	5
Q	(Australia) B Dyke	6^{3}	4
2	(West Germany) B Becker	7^{7}	6

Second round
6	(Austria) H Skoff	6	1	6
Q	(Sweden) T Högstedt	2	6	3
(Sweden) J Svensson	6	6
3	(France) Y Noah	2	4
(Czechoslovakia) M Mečíř	6	6
(Italy) P Canè	0	4
(Soviet Union) A Volkov	4	6	3
2	(West Germany) B Becker	6	3	6

Quarterfinals
6	(Austria) H Skoff	4	2
(Sweden) J Svensson	6	6
(Czechoslovakia) M Mečíř	4	2
2	(West Germany) B Becker	6	6

Semifinals
(Sweden) J Svensson	5	2
2	(West Germany) B Becker	7	6
