= 1996 Eurocard Open – Doubles =

Doubles
- 1996 Eurocard Open
- 1995 Champions: (Netherlands) Jacco Eltingh (Netherlands) Paul Haarhuis

Final
- Champions: (Canada) Sébastien Lareau (United States) Alex O'Brien
- Runners-up: (Netherlands) Jacco Eltingh (Netherlands) Paul Haarhuis
- Score: 3–6, 6–4, 6–3

Details
- Draw: 24
- Seeds: 8

Events
Singles	Doubles
← 1995 ·	Eurocard Open	· 1997 →

Jacco Eltingh and Paul Haarhuis were the defending champions but lost in the final 3–6, 6–4, 6–3 against Sébastien Lareau and Alex O'Brien.

== Seeds ==
Champion seeds are indicated in bold text while text in italics indicates the round in which those seeds were eliminated. All eight seeded teams received byes into the second round.

1. (Australia) Todd Woodbridge / (Australia) Mark Woodforde (quarterfinals)
2. (Zimbabwe) Byron Black / (Canada) Grant Connell (second round)
3. (Russia) Yevgeny Kafelnikov / (Czech Republic) Daniel Vacek (second round)
4. (The Bahamas) Mark Knowles / (Canada) Daniel Nestor (second round)
5. (France) Guy Forget / (Switzerland) Jakob Hlasek (second round)
6. (South Africa) Ellis Ferreira / (Netherlands) Jan Siemerink (second round)
7. (Netherlands) Jacco Eltingh / (Netherlands) Paul Haarhuis (final)
8. (Canada) **Sébastien Lareau** / (United States) **Alex O'Brien (champions)**

== Draw ==
=== Key ===
- Q = Qualifier
- WC = Wild card
- LL = Lucky loser
- Alt = Alternate
- ITF = ITF entry
- PR = Protected ranking
- SR = Special ranking
- SE = Special exempt
- JE = Junior exempt
- JR = Junior Accelerator Programme entrant
- CO = College Accelerator Programme entrant
- NG = Next Gen Accelerator Program entrant
- w/o = Walkover
- r = Retired
- d = Defaulted

=== Final ===
Final

7
- (Netherlands) Jacco Eltingh
- (Netherlands) Paul Haarhuis
**6**
4
3

8
- (Canada) **Sébastien Lareau**
- (United States) **Alex O'Brien**
3
**6**
**6**

=== Top half ===
First round

Second round

Quarterfinals

Semifinals

1
- (Australia) **T Woodbridge**
- (Australia) **M Woodforde**
4
**6**
**7**

- (Czech Republic) **P Korda**
- (Czech Republic) **C Suk**
5
**6**
**6**

- (Czech Republic) P Korda
- (Czech Republic) C Suk
**6**
3
6

- (South Africa) D Adams
- (Netherlands) M Oosting
**7**
3
3

1
- (Australia) T Woodbridge
- (Australia) M Woodforde
2
**6**
2

- (United States) **P Galbraith**
- (Australia) **S Stolle**
6
**6**
**7**

7
- (Netherlands) **J Eltingh**
- (Netherlands) **P Haarhuis**
**6**
1
**6**

Q
- (Germany) H Dreekmann
- (Germany) A Rădulescu
**7**
3
6

- (United States) P Galbraith
- (Australia) S Stolle
**6**
2
3

7
- (Netherlands) **J Eltingh**
- (Netherlands) **P Haarhuis**
4
**6**
**6**

7
- (Netherlands) **J Eltingh**
- (Netherlands) **P Haarhuis**
**6**
6
**7**

WC
- (Croatia) S Hiršzon
- (Croatia) G Ivanišević
3
**7**
6

3
- (Russia) Y Kafelnikov
- (Czech Republic) D Vacek
6
4

WC
- (Sweden) S Edberg
- (Germany) M Stich
6
**6**
3

LL
- (South Africa) **J-L de Jager**
- (South Africa) **C van Rensburg**
**7**
**6**

LL
- (South Africa) **J-L de Jager**
- (South Africa) **C van Rensburg**
**7**
4
**6**

LL
- (South Africa) J-L de Jager
- (South Africa) C van Rensburg
**7**
6
3

WC
- (Croatia) **S Hiršzon**
- (Croatia) **G Ivanišević**
2
**7**
**7**

WC
- (Croatia) **S Hiršzon**
- (Croatia) **G Ivanišević**
6
**7**
**6**

- (Argentina) L Lobo
- (Spain) J Sánchez
**6**
6
6

WC
- (Croatia) **S Hiršzon**
- (Croatia) **G Ivanišević**
3
**7**
**6**

6
- (South Africa) E Ferreira
- (Netherlands) J Siemerink
**6**
6
4

=== Bottom half ===
First round

Second round

Quarterfinals

Semifinals

5
- (France) G Forget
- (Switzerland) J Hlasek
**6**
5
3

- (United States) **J Grabb**
- (United States) **R Reneberg**
**7**
**7**

- (United States) **J Grabb**
- (United States) **R Reneberg**
3
**7**
**6**

- (United Kingdom) N Broad
- (South Africa) P Norval
5
5

- (United States) **J Grabb**
- (United States) **R Reneberg**
**6**
**6**

- (Belgium) L Pimek
- (South Africa) B Talbot
**6**
1
6

- (Spain) T Carbonell
- (Spain) F Roig
4
2

- (Spain) **T Carbonell**
- (Spain) **F Roig**
2
**6**
**7**

- (Spain) **T Carbonell**
- (Spain) **F Roig**
**6**
3
**6**

4
- (The Bahamas) M Knowles
- (Canada) D Nestor
2
**6**
3

- (United States) J Grabb
- (United States) R Reneberg
2
6

8
- (Canada) **S Lareau**
- (United States) **A O'Brien**
**6**
**7**

8
- (Canada) **S Lareau**
- (United States) **A O'Brien**
**6**
**6**

- (United States) **A Agassi**
- (United States) **L Jensen**
**7**
3
**6**

- (United States) A Agassi
- (United States) L Jensen
4
4

- (Czech Republic) M Damm
- (Czech Republic) P Vízner
6
**6**
2

8
- (Canada) **S Lareau**
- (United States) **A O'Brien**
6
**6**
**6**

- (United States) R Leach
- (Russia) A Olhovskiy
5
4

- (United States) T Kronemann
- (Australia) D Macpherson
**7**
3
4

- (United States) **T Kronemann**
- (Australia) **D Macpherson**
**7**
**6**

- (United States) **T Kronemann**
- (Australia) **D Macpherson**
**7**
**6**

2
- (Zimbabwe) B Black
- (Canada) G Connell
6
3
