= Rüdiger Haas =

German tennis player

- Country (sports): West Germany (until 1990); Germany
- Born: 15 December 1969 (age 56) Eberbach, West Germany
- Height: 1.93 m (6 ft 4 in)
- Plays: Right-handed
- Prize money: $49,741

Singles
- Career record: 1–4
- Career titles: 0
- Highest ranking: No. 321 (2 March 1992)

Doubles
- Career record: 10–5
- Career titles: 2
- Highest ranking: No. 138 (2 October 1989)

Rüdiger Haas (born 15 December 1969) is a former professional tennis player from Germany.

== Career ==
Despite winning two Grand Prix doubles titles, Haas never competed in the main draw of a Grand Slam event. He did however make some Grand Slam appearances in the juniors. The biggest tournament he participated in as a singles player was the 1991 German Open, part of the ATP Super 9 series. He lost in the first round to Omar Camporese from Italy. The only occasion that he made it past the opening round of a Grand Prix or ATP Tour tournament was in the 1991 Kremlin Cup, where he defeated Soviet Sergei Skakun, before being eliminated in the second round by Jakob Hlasek.

He won his first doubles title at Frankfurt in 1988, partnering a 17-year-old Goran Ivanišević. They upset the reigning Australian Open champions Rick Leach and Jim Pugh in the semi-finals, then defeated Jeremy Bates and Tom Nijssen in the final. The other title win was in Palermo the following year, with he and partner Peter Ballauff beating both the first and second seeds.

== Grand Prix career finals ==
=== Doubles: 2 (2–0) ===
Result	W–L	Date	Tournament	Surface	Partner	Opponents	Score
Win	1–0	Oct 1988	Frankfurt, West Germany	Carpet	(Socialist Federal Republic of Yugoslavia) Goran Ivanišević	(United Kingdom) Jeremy Bates (Netherlands) Tom Nijssen	1–6, 7–5, 6–3
Win	2–0	Oct 1989	Palermo, Italy	Clay	(West Germany) Peter Ballauff	(Socialist Federal Republic of Yugoslavia) Goran Ivanišević (Italy) Diego Nargiso	6–2, 6–7, 6–4

== Challenger titles ==
=== Doubles: (1) ===
Result	No.	Date	Tournament	Surface	Partner	Opponents	Score
Win	1.	1992	Fürth, Germany	Clay	(Germany) Udo Riglewski	(United States) Brian Joelson (Haiti) Bertrand Madsen	6–1, 6–3
