= 1987 Frankfurt Cup =

- Date: 9–15 November
- Edition: 1st
- Category: Grand Prix
- Draw: 32S / 16D
- Prize money: $150,000
- Surface: Carpet / indoor
- Location: Frankfurt, West Germany

Champions

Singles
- (United States) Tim Mayotte

Doubles
- (West Germany) Boris Becker / (West Germany) Patrik Kühnen
- Frankfurt Cup

The 1987 Frankfurt Cup, was a men's tennis tournament played on indoor carpet courts and in Frankfurt, West Germany that was part of the 1987 Grand Prix circuit. It was the inaugural edition of the tournament was held from 9 November until 15 November 1987. Fourth-seeded Tim Mayotte won the singles title.

== Finals ==
=== Singles ===
(United States) Tim Mayotte defeated (Ecuador) Andrés Gómez, 7–6^{(8–6)}, 6–4

- It was Mayotte's 5th and last singles title of the year and the 7th of his career.

=== Doubles ===
(West Germany) Boris Becker / (West Germany) Patrik Kühnen defeated (United States) Scott Davis / (United States) David Pate, 6–4, 6–2

- It was Becker's 3rd and last doubles title of the year and the 6th of his career. It was Kühnen's only doubles title of the year and the 1st of his career.
