= 1989 Frankfurt Cup =

- Date: 23–29 October
- Edition: 3rd
- Category: Grand Prix
- Draw: 32S / 16D
- Prize money: $175,000
- Surface: Carpet / indoor
- Location: Frankfurt, West Germany

Champions

Singles
- (United States) Kevin Curren

Doubles
- (South Africa) Pieter Aldrich / (South Africa) Danie Visser
- Frankfurt Cup

The 1989 Frankfurt Cup, was a men's tennis tournament played on indoor carpet courts and in Frankfurt, West Germany that was part of the 1989 Grand Prix circuit. It was the third and last edition of the tournament was held from 23 October until 29 October 1989. Third-seeded Kevin Curren won the singles title.

== Finals ==
=== Singles ===
(United States) Kevin Curren defeated (Czechoslovakia) Petr Korda, 6–2, 7–5

- It was Curren's only singles title of the year and the 5th and last of his career.

=== Doubles ===
(South Africa) Pieter Aldrich / (South Africa) Danie Visser defeated (United States) Kevin Curren / (West Germany) Eric Jelen, 7–6, 6–7, 6–3

- It was Aldrich's 3rd and last doubles title of the year and the 4th of his career. It was Visser's 3rd and last doubles title of the year and the 6th of his career
