= 1991 Eurocard Classics =

- Date: 18–24 February
- Edition: 2nd
- Category: Championship Series DW
- Draw: 32S / 16D
- Prize money: $865,000
- Surface: Carpet / indoor
- Location: Stuttgart, Germany
- Venue: Hanns-Martin-Schleyer-Halle

Champions

Singles
- (Sweden) Stefan Edberg

Doubles
- (Spain) Sergio Casal / (Spain) Emilio Sánchez
| ← 1990 · | Eurocard Open | · 1992 → |

The 1991 Eurocard Classics was a men's ATP tennis tournament played on indoor carpet courts at the Hanns-Martin-Schleyer-Halle in Stuttgart, Germany that was part of the Championship Series of the 1991 ATP Tour. It was the second edition of the tournament and was held from 18 February until 24 February 1991. Second-seeded Stefan Edberg won the singles title.

== Finals ==
=== Singles ===
(Sweden) Stefan Edberg defeated (Sweden) Jonas Svensson, 6–2, 3–6, 7–5, 6–2

- It was Edberg's 1st singles title of the year and 28th of his career.

=== Doubles ===
(Spain) Sergio Casal / (Spain) Emilio Sánchez defeated (United Kingdom) Jeremy Bates / (United Kingdom) Nick Brown, 6–3, 7–5
