= Frankfurt Cup =

Defunct tennis tournament
- Tour: Grand Prix circuit
- Founded: 1987
- Abolished: 1989
- Editions: 3
- Location: Frankfurt, West Germany
- Surface: Carpet / indoor

The Frankfurt Cup was a men's tennis tournament played in Frankfurt, West Germany from 1987 until 1989. The event was part of the Grand Prix tennis circuit and was held on indoor carpet courts.

According to the ATP website, its place in the calendar was preceded by the Frankfurt Grand Prix (1980 to 1982) and followed by the European Indoor Championships in Berlin (1990 and 1991).

== Past finals ==
=== Singles ===
Year	Champions	Runners-up	Score
1987	(United States) Tim Mayotte	(Ecuador) Andrés Gómez	7–6, 6–4
1988	(United States) Tim Mayotte	(Mexico) Leonardo Lavalle	4–6, 6–4, 6–3
1989	(United States) Kevin Curren	(Czech Republic) Petr Korda	6–2, 7–5

=== Doubles ===
Year	Champions	Runners-up	Score
1987	(West Germany) Boris Becker (West Germany) Patrik Kühnen	(United States) Scott Davis (United States) David Pate	6–4, 6–2
1988	(West Germany) Rüdiger Haas (Socialist Federal Republic of Yugoslavia) Goran Ivanišević	(United Kingdom) Jeremy Bates (Netherlands) Tom Nijssen	1–6, 7–5, 6–3
1989	(South Africa) Pieter Aldrich (South Africa) Danie Visser	(United States) Kevin Curren (West Germany) Eric Jelen	7–6, 6–7, 6–3

== See also ==
- Frankfurt Grand Prix (1980–1982)
