= 1994 Eurocard Open – Singles =

Singles
- 1994 Eurocard Open

Final
- Champion: (Sweden) Stefan Edberg
- Runner-up: (Croatia) Goran Ivanišević
- Score: 4–6, 6–4, 6–2, 6–2

Details
- Draw: 32
- Seeds: 8

Events
Singles	Doubles
- Eurocard Open

Stefan Edberg defeated Goran Ivanišević 4–6, 6–4, 6–2, 6–2 to win the 1994 Eurocard Open singles event. Michael Stich was the defending champion.

== Seeds ==
1. (Germany) Michael Stich (quarterfinals)
2. (Spain) Sergi Bruguera (semifinals)
3. (Sweden) Stefan Edberg (champion)
4. (Croatia) Goran Ivanišević (finalist)
5. (Sweden) Magnus Gustafsson (quarterfinals)
6. (France) Cédric Pioline (second round)
7. (Germany) Boris Becker (semifinals)
8. (Czech Republic) Petr Korda (first round)

== Draws ==
=== Key ===
- Q – Qualifier
- WC – Wild Card

=== Finals ===
Semifinals
7	(Germany) B Becker	6	3	3
4	(Croatia) G Ivanišević	3	6	6
3	(Sweden) S Edberg	4	6	6
2	(Spain) S Bruguera	6	3	2

Finals
4	(Croatia) G Ivanišević	6	4	2	2
3	(Sweden) S Edberg	4	6	6	6

=== Section 1 ===
First round
1	(Germany) M Stich	6	6
(Australia) W Masur	4	3
(Sweden) J Svensson	3	6	1
(Russia) A Cherkasov	6	4	6
(Spain) A Berasategui	2	3
(Russia) A Volkov	6	6
Q	(Germany) D Prinosil	1	4
7	(Germany) B Becker	6	6
4	(Croatia) G Ivanišević	3	6	6
(South Africa) W Ferreira	6	3	2
(Spain) E Sánchez	3	2
(Spain) C Costa	6	6
(Spain) J Sánchez	2	6^{3}
WC	(France) H Leconte	6	7
(Sweden) M Larsson	7	4	6^{2}
6	(France) C Pioline	6^{6}	6	7

Second round
1	(Germany) M Stich	6	6
(Russia) A Cherkasov	2	1
(Russia) A Volkov	5	5
7	(Germany) B Becker	7	7
4	(Croatia) G Ivanišević	6	4	6
(Spain) C Costa	3	6	0
WC	(France) H Leconte	6	6^{0}	6
6	(France) C Pioline	4	7	3

Quarterfinals
1	(Germany) M Stich	3	6^{4}
7	(Germany) B Becker	6	7
4	(Croatia) G Ivanišević	6	5	6
WC	(France) H Leconte	1	7	4

Semifinals
7	(Germany) B Becker	6	3	3
4	(Croatia) G Ivanišević	3	6	6

=== Section 2 ===
First round
5	(Sweden) M Gustafsson	6	3	6
(Haiti) R Agénor	4	6	3
WC	(Germany) CU Steeb	6	6
(Israel) A Mansdorf	4	4
(Australia) M Woodforde	2	4
Q	(Australia) J Stoltenberg	6	6
(Germany) MK Goellner	7	6^{2}	0
3	(Sweden) S Edberg	6^{4}	7	6
8	(Czech Republic) P Korda	2	6^{2}
(France) A Boetsch	6	7
(Czech Republic) K Nováček	2	6	6
WC	(Germany) P Kühnen	6	3	3
(United States) B Gilbert	6^{5}	1
Q	(Russia) Y Kafelnikov	7	6
Q	(Russia) A Olhovskiy	6	6^{3}	4
2	(Spain) S Bruguera	3	7	6

Second round
5	(Sweden) M Gustafsson	6	4	6
WC	(Germany) CU Steeb	3	6	1
Q	(Australia) J Stoltenberg	6^{0}	1
3	(Sweden) S Edberg	7	6
(France) A Boetsch	6	7
(Czech Republic) K Nováček	3	6^{7}
Q	(Russia) Y Kafelnikov	6	5	1
2	(Spain) S Bruguera	1	7	6

Quarterfinals
5	(Sweden) M Gustafsson	3	6	3
3	(Sweden) S Edberg	6	2	6
(France) A Boetsch	3	2
2	(Spain) S Bruguera	6	6

Semifinals
3	(Sweden) S Edberg	4	6	6
2	(Spain) S Bruguera	6	3	2
