= Tim Mayotte =

American tennis player

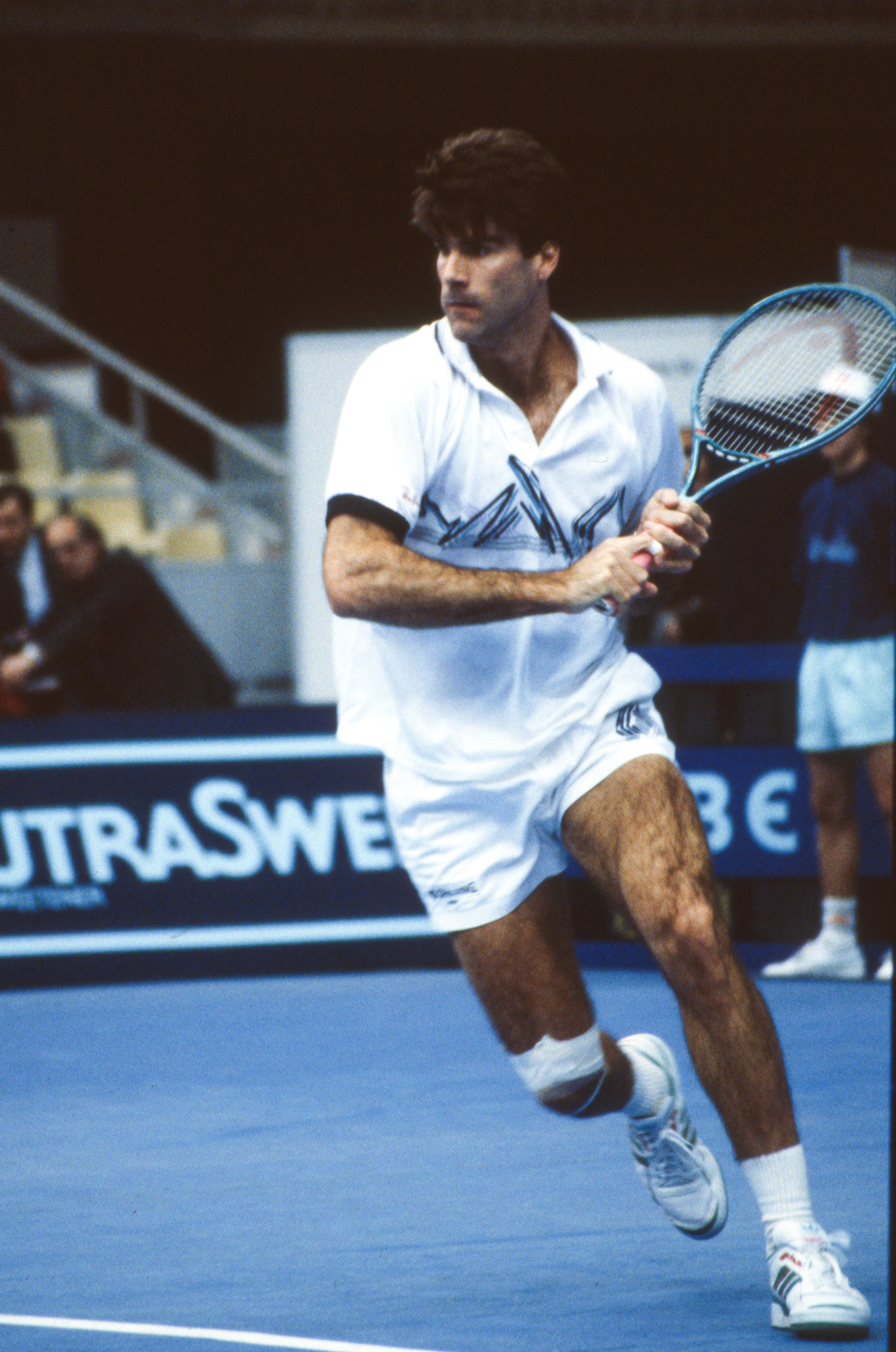
- Country (sports): United States
- Residence: New York City, New York, U.S.
- Born: August 3, 1960 (age 66) Springfield, Massachusetts, U.S.
- Height: 1.90 m (6 ft 3 in)
- Turned pro: 1981
- Retired: 1992
- Plays: Right-handed (one-handed backhand)
- Prize money: $2,663,672

Singles
- Career record: 340–202
- Career titles: 12
- Highest ranking: No. 7 (October 31, 1988)

Grand Slam singles results
- Australian Open: SF (1983)
- French Open: 2R (1988, 1989)
- Wimbledon: SF (1982)
- US Open: QF (1989)

Other tournaments
- Tour Finals: QF (1985)
- WCT Finals: F (1985)
- Olympic Games: F (1988)

Doubles
- Career record: 38–57
- Career titles: 1
- Highest ranking: No. 66 (January 3, 1983)
Medal record
Olympic Games
Silver medal – second place	1988 Seoul	Singles

Timothy Mayotte (born August 3, 1960) is an American former professional tennis player. He was ranked as high as world No. 7 in men's singles by the Association of Tennis Professionals (ATP). Mayotte won twelve singles titles during his career.

== Professional career ==
A tall serve-and-volleyer, Mayotte learned to play the game on the public courts of Forest Park in his hometown of Springfield, Massachusetts. He played tennis for Stanford University in the early-1980s and won the NCAA singles title in 1981.

Mayotte won his first top-level professional singles title in 1985 at the inaugural Lipton International Players Championships (now known as the Miami Masters). Other career highlights included winning the Queen's Club Championships in London in 1986, capturing the Paris Indoor title in 1987, and winning the men's singles silver medal at the 1988 Olympic Games in Seoul. Mayotte beat almost every great player of his era including Agassi, Sampras, Edberg, Becker, Noah, Connors, Michael Chang etc.

His best performances in Grand Slam tournaments came in reaching the semifinals at Wimbledon in 1982 and the Australian Open in 1983. He also reached the quarterfinals of the US Open in 1989. Mayotte brought home a Silver Medal in the 1988 Olympics in Seoul. It was the only competition his mother Mary watched in person.

During his career, Mayotte won 12 singles titles and one doubles title. His career-high singles ranking was world No. 7. His final singles title was won in 1989 at Washington DC. Mayotte retired from the professional tour in 1992.

He was hired by the United States Tennis Association (USTA) to serve as a national coach in July 2009. "Tennis Magazine" voted him one of Tennis' Heros in 2018 because of his stand on improving the standards of coaching in the United States.

Mayotte was the youngest of a great tennis family that sprung out of Springfield. Mayotte's older brother Chris also played on the international tennis tour for a few seasons reaching as high as 80 ATP. Their older brother John was the number one junior player in New England and later one of the top players in the New England Tennis Stars (NETS), a tour started by Ted Hoehn in the late 1970s and 1980s.. Mary Mayotte was a great junior player in New England but sadly played before Title 9 forced colleges to offer scholarships to women.

Tim Mayotte's agent was his brother in law Tom Ford along with his brother John. John went to work as a tennis agent working for Donald Dell's ProServ. There, he managed top-ten and All-American players on the ATP and WTA Tours. His clients included Amanda Coetzer and Greg Rusedski, who became semifinalist and finalists at the French Open and US Open consecutively.

== Coach with USTA Player Development Program ==
After working as a coach for USTA Player Development under General Manager Patrick McEnroe, Mayotte spoke publicly about his experiences:

A significant issue is that leadership at USTA Player Development displays limited willingness or ability to discuss ideas and methods. While the goal is to produce strong, independent players capable of flexibility and adjustment, leadership does not demonstrate these qualities, leading to a cultural disconnect. Jose and Patrick rely on their prominence to influence others, rather than focusing on player development. Building healthy individuals requires supporting players through moral, mental, and emotional choices alongside their parents, which is difficult to manage from a broadcast booth or boardroom.

== Career finals ==
=== Singles: 23 (12 titles / 11 runner-ups) ===
Legend Year-end championships (0–1) Grand Prix Super Series (0–1) Summer Olympics (0–1) ATP Championship Series (0–1) Grand Prix Regular Series (12–7)	Finals by surface Hard (4–2) Grass (1–2) Clay (0–0) Carpet (7–7)

Result	W-L	Date	Tournament	Surface	Opponent	Score
Loss	0–1	Oct 1981	Maui, US	Hard	(United States) Hank Pfister	4–6, 4–6
Loss	0–2	Mar 1982	Strasbourg WCT, France	Carpet (i)	(Czechoslovakia) Ivan Lendl	0–6, 5–7, 1–6
Loss	0–3	Jun 1982	Bristol, England	Grass	(Australia) John Alexander	3–6, 4–6
Loss	0–4	Jul 1984	Newport, US	Grass	(India) Vijay Amritraj	6–3, 4–6, 4–6
Win	1–4	Feb 1985	Delray Beach, US	Hard	(United States) Scott Davis	4–6, 4–6, 6–3, 6–2, 6–4
Loss	1–5	Apr 1985	WCT Finals, Dallas	Carpet (i)	(Czechoslovakia) Ivan Lendl	6–7^{(4–7)}, 4–6, 1–6
Loss	1–6	Feb 1986	Philadelphia, US	Carpet (i)	(Czechoslovakia) Ivan Lendl	w/o
Win	2–6	Jun 1986	London Queen's Club, UK	Grass	(United States) Jimmy Connors	6–4, 2–1 ret.
Win	3–6	Feb 1987	Philadelphia, US	Carpet (i)	(United States) John McEnroe	3–6, 6–1, 6–3, 6–1
Win	4–6	Apr 1987	Chicago, US	Carpet (i)	(United States) David Pate	6–4, 6–2
Win	5–6	Oct 1987	Toulouse, France	Carpet (i)	(West Germany) Ricki Osterthun	6–2, 5–7, 6–4
Win	6–6	Nov 1987	Paris Indoor, France	Carpet (i)	(United States) Brad Gilbert	2–6, 6–3, 7–5, 6–7^{(5–7)}, 6–3
Win	7–6	Nov 1987	Frankfurt, West Germany	Carpet (i)	(Ecuador) Andrés Gómez	7–6^{(8–6)}, 6–4
Win	8–6	Feb 1988	Philadelphia, US	Carpet (i)	(Australia) John Fitzgerald	4–6, 6–2, 6–2, 6–3
Win	9–6	Jul 1988	Schenectady, US	Hard	(United States) Johan Kriek	5–7, 6–3, 6–2
Loss	9–7	Sep 1988	Summer Olympics, Seoul	Hard	(Czechoslovakia) Miloslav Mečíř	6–3, 2–6, 4–6, 2–6
Win	10–7	Oct 1988	Brisbane, Australia	Hard (i)	(United States) Marty Davis	6–4, 6–4
Win	11–7	Oct 1988	Frankfurt, West Germany	Carpet (i)	(Mexico) Leonardo Lavalle	4–6, 6–4, 6–3
Loss	11–8	Feb 1989	Philadelphia, US	Carpet (i)	(West Germany) Boris Becker	6–7^{(4–7)}, 1–6, 3–6
Win	12–8	Jul 1989	Washington DC, US	Hard	(United States) Brad Gilbert	3–6, 6–4, 7–5
Loss	12–9	Feb 1990	Milan, Italy	Carpet (i)	(Czechoslovakia) Ivan Lendl	3–6, 2–6
Loss	12–10	Feb 1990	Toronto Indoor, Canada	Carpet (i)	(Czechoslovakia) Ivan Lendl	3–6, 0–6
Loss	12–11	Nov 1990	Moscow, Soviet Union	Carpet (i)	(Soviet Union) Andrei Cherkasov	2–6, 1–6

=== Doubles: 3 (1 title / 2 runner-ups) ===
Result	W-L	Date	Tournament	Surface	Partner	Opponents	Score
Loss	0–1	Mar 1980	Stuttgart, Germany	Carpet	(United States) Larry Stefanki	(Poland) Wojtek Fibak (Czechoslovakia) Tomáš Šmíd	4–6, 6–7
Win	1–0	Jan 1981	San Juan, Puerto Rico	Hard	(United States) Chris Mayotte	(United States) Tim Gullikson (United States) Eliot Teltscher	6–4, 7–6
Loss	1–2	Apr 1982	Frankfurt, Germany	Carpet	(United States) Tony Giammalva	(United States) Steve Denton (Australia) Mark Edmondson	7–6, 3–6, 3–6

== Grand Slam singles performance timeline ==
Key
W	F	SF	QF	#R	RR	Q#	DNQ	A	NH

(W) winner; (F) finalist; (SF) semifinalist; (QF) quarterfinalist; (#R) rounds 4, 3, 2, 1; (RR) round-robin stage; (Q#) qualification round; (DNQ) did not qualify; (A) absent; (NH) not held; (SR) strike rate (events won / competed); (W–L) win–loss record.

Tournament	1978	1979	1980	1981	1982	1983	1984	1985	1986	1987	1988	1989	1990	1991	1992	Career SR
Australian Open	A	A	1R	QF	3R	SF	2R	4R	NH	A	A	A	1R	A	A	0 / 7
French Open	A	A	A	A	1R	1R	1R	A	A	A	2R	2R	A	A	A	0 / 5
Wimbledon	A	A	A	QF	SF	QF	4R	4R	QF	3R	QF	QF	1R	4R	A	0 / 11
US Open	A	1R	1R	3R	2R	1R	4R	4R	1R	2R	3R	QF	1R	1R	A	0 / 13
Strike rate	0 / 0	0 / 1	0 / 2	0 / 3	0 / 4	0 / 4	0 / 4	0 / 3	0 / 2	0 / 2	0 / 3	0 / 3	0 / 3	0 / 2	0 / 0	0 / 36
Year-end ranking	436	420	171	33	30	16	44	12	15	9	10	13	37	115	1097	N/A
