= Tom Nijssen =

Dutch tennis player (born 1964)

- Country (sports): Netherlands
- Residence: Amersfoort, Netherlands
- Born: 1 October 1964 (age 61) Maastricht, Netherlands
- Height: 1.75 m (5 ft 9 in)
- Turned pro: 1984
- Retired: 1995
- Plays: Right-handed
- Prize money: $1,474,432

Singles
- Career record: 45–84
- Career titles: 0
- Highest ranking: No. 87 (17 April 1989)

Grand Slam singles results
- Australian Open: 3R (1989)
- French Open: 1R (1986, 1987, 1989)
- Wimbledon: 2R (1989)
- US Open: 1R (1989)

Doubles
- Career record: 261–268
- Career titles: 11
- Highest ranking: No. 10 (11 May 1992)

Grand Slam doubles results
- Australian Open: QF (1992, 1994)
- French Open: QF (1991)
- Wimbledon: QF (1994)
- US Open: QF (1994)

Mixed doubles
- Career titles: 4

Grand Slam mixed doubles results
- Australian Open: SF (1989)
- French Open: W (1989)
- Wimbledon: F (1993)
- US Open: W (1991)

Tom Nijssen (born 1 October 1964) is a former professional tennis player from the Netherlands. He went pro in 1984 and played at the ATP World Tour for 15 years. Nijssen's highest ATP singles ranking was No. 87 on 17 April 1989. He reached his best doubles ranking on 11 May 1992 when he became world No. 10. A doubles specialist, he won two Grand Slam mixed doubles titles with Manon Bollegraf, the French Open in 1989 and the US Open in 1991. They were runner-up at the Wimbledon mixed doubles tournament in 1993. In 1992 Nijssen and Helena Suková were the US Open mixed-doubles finalists.

== Grand Slam finals ==
=== Mixed doubles: 3 (2 titles, 2 runner-ups) ===
Result	Year	Championship	Surface	Partner	Opponents	Score
Win	1989	French Open	Clay	(Netherlands) Manon Bollegraf	(Argentina) Horacio de la Peña (Spain) Arantxa Sánchez Vicario	6–3, 6–7^{(3–7)}, 6–2
Win	1991	US Open	Hard	(Netherlands) Manon Bollegraf	(Spain) Emilio Sánchez (Spain) Arantxa Sánchez Vicario	6–2, 7–6^{(7–2)}
Loss	1992	US Open	Hard	(Czech Republic) Helena Suková	(Australia) Nicole Provis (Australia) Mark Woodforde	6–4, 3–6, 3–6
Loss	1993	Wimbledon	Grass	(Netherlands) Manon Bollegraf	(Australia) Mark Woodforde (United States) Martina Navratilova	3–6, 4–6

== Career finals ==
=== Doubles: 25 (11 titles / 14 runner-ups) ===
Legend Grand Slam (0–0) Tennis Masters Cup (0–0) ATP Masters Series (0–2) ATP International Series Gold (3–2) ATP World Series (8–10)	Finals by surface Hard (4–1) Clay (1–5) Grass (0–0) Carpet (6–8)

Result	W-L	Date	Tournament	Surface	Partner	Opponents	Score
Loss	0–1	Aug 1986	Hilversum, Netherlands	Clay	(Netherlands) Johan Vekemans	(Czechoslovakia) Miloslav Mečíř (Czechoslovakia) Tomáš Šmíd	4–6, 2–6
Loss	0–2	Jun 1987	Athens, Greece	Clay	(Czechoslovakia) Jaroslav Navrátil	(West Germany) Tore Meinecke (West Germany) Ricki Osterthun	2–6, 6–3, 2–6
Loss	0–3	Aug 1987	Hilversum, Netherlands	Clay	(Netherlands) Johan Vekemans	(Poland) Wojtek Fibak (Czechoslovakia) Miloslav Mečíř	6–7, 7–5, 2–6
Win	1–3	Oct 1987	Tokyo Indoor, Japan	Carpet (i)	(Australia) Broderick Dyke	(United States) Sammy Giammalva, Jr. (United States) Jim Grabb	6–3, 6–2
Win	2–3	Feb 1988	Metz, France	Carpet (i)	(Czechoslovakia) Jaroslav Navrátil	(United States) Rill Baxter (Nigeria) Nduka Odizor	6–2, 6–7, 7–6
Win	3–3	Oct 1988	Toulouse, France	Hard (i)	(West Germany) Ricki Osterthun	(Iran) Mansour Bahrami (France) Guy Forget	6–3, 6–4
Loss	3–4	Oct 1988	Frankfurt, Germany	Carpet (i)	(United Kingdom) Jeremy Bates	(West Germany) Rüdiger Haas (Socialist Federal Republic of Yugoslavia) Goran Ivanišević	6–1, 5–7, 3–6
Win	4–4	Nov 1988	Brussels, Belgium	Carpet (i)	(Australia) Wally Masur	(Australia) John Fitzgerald (Czechoslovakia) Tomáš Šmíd	7–5, 7–6
Loss	4–5	Feb 1990	Milan, Italy	Carpet (i)	(West Germany) Udo Riglewski	(Italy) Omar Camporese (Italy) Diego Nargiso	4–6, 4–6
Loss	4–6	Feb 1990	Stuttgart Indoor, Germany	Carpet (i)	(Denmark) Michael Mortensen	(Switzerland) Jakob Hlasek (France) Guy Forget	3–6, 2–6
Loss	4–7	Feb 1991	Milan, Italy	Carpet (i)	(Czechoslovakia) Cyril Suk	(Italy) Omar Camporese (Croatia) Goran Ivanišević	4–6, 6–7
Loss	4–8	Apr 1991	Estoril, Portugal	Clay	(Czechoslovakia) Cyril Suk	(Netherlands) Paul Haarhuis (Netherlands) Mark Koevermans	3–6, 3–6
Win	5–8	Oct 1991	Toulouse, France	Hard (i)	(Czechoslovakia) Cyril Suk	(United Kingdom) Jeremy Bates (United States) Kevin Curren	4–6, 6–3, 7–6
Win	6–8	Oct 1991	Lyon, France	Carpet (i)	(Czechoslovakia) Cyril Suk	(United States) Steve DeVries (Australia) David Macpherson	7–6, 6–3
Loss	6–9	Oct 1991	Stockholm, Sweden	Carpet (i)	(Czechoslovakia) Cyril Suk	(Australia) John Fitzgerald (Sweden) Anders Järryd	5–7, 2–6
Win	7–9	Feb 1992	Stuttgart Indoor, Germany	Carpet (i)	(Czechoslovakia) Cyril Suk	(Australia) John Fitzgerald (Sweden) Anders Järryd	6–3, 6–7, 6–3
Win	8–8	Oct 1992	Basel, Switzerland	Hard (i)	(Czechoslovakia) Cyril Suk	(Czechoslovakia) Karel Nováček (Czechoslovakia) David Rikl	6–3, 6–4
Loss	8–10	Oct 1992	Bolzano, Italy	Carpet (i)	(Czechoslovakia) Cyril Suk	(Sweden) Anders Järryd (Norway) Bent-Ove Pedersen	1–6, 7–6, 3–6
Loss	8–11	Feb 1993	Milan, Italy	Carpet (i)	(Czech Republic) Cyril Suk	(Australia) Mark Kratzmann (Australia) Wally Masur	6–4, 3–6, 4–6
Win	9–11	Jul 1993	Stuttgart Outdoor, Germany	Clay	(Czech Republic) Cyril Suk	(South Africa) Gary Muller (South Africa) Piet Norval	7–6, 6–3
Loss	9–12	Nov 1993	Paris Indoor, France	Carpet (i)	(Czech Republic) Cyril Suk	(Zimbabwe) Byron Black (United States) Jonathan Stark	6–4, 5–7, 2–6
Win	10–12	Jan 1994	Oahu, U.S.	Hard	(Czech Republic) Cyril Suk	(United States) Alex O'Brien (United States) Jonathan Stark	6–4, 6–4
Win	11–12	Feb 1994	Milan, Italy	Carpet (i)	(Czech Republic) Cyril Suk	(Netherlands) Hendrik Jan Davids (South Africa) Piet Norval	4–6, 7–6, 7–6
Loss	11–13	Apr 1996	Estoril, Portugal	Clay	(United States) Greg Van Emburgh	(Spain) Tomás Carbonell (Spain) Francisco Roig	3–6, 2–6
Loss	11–14	Jan 1998	Auckland, New Zealand	Hard	(United States) Jeff Tarango	(United States) Patrick Galbraith (New Zealand) Brett Steven	4–6, 2–6

== Doubles performance timeline ==
Key
W	F	SF	QF	#R	RR	Q#	DNQ	A	NH

(W) winner; (F) finalist; (SF) semifinalist; (QF) quarterfinalist; (#R) rounds 4, 3, 2, 1; (RR) round-robin stage; (Q#) qualification round; (DNQ) did not qualify; (A) absent; (NH) not held; (SR) strike rate (events won / competed); (W–L) win–loss record.

Tournament	1984	1985	1986	1987	1988	1989	1990	1991	1992	1993	1994	1995	1996	1997	1998	Career SR	Career win–loss
Grand Slam tournaments
Australian Open	A	A	A	A	2R	3R	1R	1R	QF	2R	QF	1R	1R	3R	1R	0 / 11	12–11
French Open	A	A	2R	1R	2R	3R	1R	QF	2R	2R	3R	1R	1R	2R	A	0 / 12	13–12
Wimbledon	A	A	A	A	3R	2R	2R	3R	1R	1R	QF	1R	3R	2R	1R	0 / 11	12–11
US Open	A	A	A	A	A	1R	A	1R	3R	3R	QF	2R	2R	1R	A	0 / 8	9–8
Grand Slam SR	0 / 0	0 / 0	0 / 1	0 / 1	0 / 3	0 / 4	0 / 3	0 / 4	0 / 4	0 / 4	0 / 4	0 / 4	0 / 4	0 / 4	0 / 2	0 / 42	N/A
Annual win–loss	0–0	0–0	1–1	0–1	4–3	5–4	2–3	5–4	6–4	4–4	11–4	1–4	3–4	4–4	0–2	N/A	46–42
ATP Masters Series
Indian Wells	These tournaments were not Masters Series events before 1990						A	A	1R	A	A	A	1R	A	A	0 / 2	0–2
Miami	These tournaments were not Masters Series events before 1990						1R	1R	3R	2R	2R	2R	1R	1R	2R	0 / 9	2–9
Monte Carlo	These tournaments were not Masters Series events before 1990						A	1R	SF	1R	1R	SF	1R	A	A	0 / 6	5–6
Rome	These tournaments were not Masters Series events before 1990						1R	1R	1R	1R	1R	1R	1R	1R	A	0 / 8	0–8
Hamburg	These tournaments were not Masters Series events before 1990						1R	QF	SF	1R	QF	1R	2R	A	A	0 / 7	5–7
Canada	These tournaments were not Masters Series events before 1990						A	A	A	A	A	A	A	A	A	0 / 0	0–0
Cincinnati	These tournaments were not Masters Series events before 1990						A	A	A	A	A	A	A	A	A	0 / 0	0–0
Stuttgart (Stockholm)	These tournaments were not Masters Series events before 1990						1R	F	QF	QF	2R	A	A	A	A	0 / 5	6–5
Paris	These tournaments were not Masters Series events before 1990						A	1R	QF	F	2R	A	A	A	A	0 / 4	6–4
Masters Series SR	N/A						0 / 4	0 / 6	0 / 7	0 / 6	0 / 6	0 / 4	0 / 5	0 / 2	0 / 1	0 / 41	N/A
Annual win–loss	N/A						0–4	5–6	8–7	5–6	1–6	4–4	1–5	0–2	0–1	N/A	24–41
Year-end ranking	430	82	97	44	34	84	53	23	18	25	28	74	79	96	313	N/A	

== See also ==
- List of Grand Slam Mixed Doubles champions
