= Eurocard Open =

Defunct tennis tournament
- Founded: 1988
- Abolished: 2001
- Location: Stuttgart (1988–2001); Essen (Oct. 1995)
- Category: Exhibition (1988–1989); ATP Championship Series (1990–1995); ATP Super 9 / Tennis Masters Series (1995–2001)
- Surface: Carpet / indoor (1988–1997); Hard / indoor (1998–2001)
- Draw: 48S / 24Q / 16D
- Prize money: US$2,950,000

The Eurocard Open was an annual tennis tournament for male professional players. The event was held annually in Stuttgart, Germany, and was played on indoor carpet from 1988 to 1997. Before 1990, during years 1988–1989 the tournament was organized as an invitational round-robin exhibition for 8 players. From 1990 to 1995, the Eurocard Open was an ATP Championship Series tournament, and was held every February on the ATP Tour.

Starting in October 1995, the Eurocard Open was upgraded to ATP Super 9 status. In 1995–1996, the ATP calendar underwent some interesting tournament swaps among indoor events, when the tournament was held on carpet courts. In October 1995, the Stockholm Super 9 event was downgraded to ATP World Series status and moved to November, getting replaced in its old Super 9 slot by the Eurocard Open in Essen. The Antwerp event was dropped from the calendar in 1995 to make room for Stockholm's new slot in November. In 1996, the Eurocard Open retained its Super 9 status but moved from Essen and back to Stuttgart, while Antwerp was again returned to the calendar to replace the Eurocard Open's old slot in February.

In 1998, the Eurocard Open changed surface from indoor carpet to indoor hardcourt. After the last Eurocard Open was held in 2001, the tournament was discontinued, and the eighth ATP Masters Series event of the calendar year was moved to Madrid in 2002.

== Past results ==
=== Singles ===
Location	Year	Champions	Runners-up	Score
↓ ATP Tour 500 (Note: Known as Championship Series from 1990 till 1999.) ↓
Stuttgart	1990	(Germany) Boris Becker	(Czechoslovakia) Ivan Lendl	6–2, 6–2
Stuttgart	1991	(Sweden) Stefan Edberg	(Sweden) Jonas Svensson	6–2, 3–6, 7–5, 6–2
Stuttgart	1992	(Croatia) Goran Ivanišević	(Sweden) Stefan Edberg	6–7^{(5–7)}, 6–3, 6–4, 6–4
Stuttgart	1993	(Germany) Michael Stich	(Netherlands) Richard Krajicek	4–6, 7–5, 7–6^{(7–4)}, 3–6, 7–5
Stuttgart	1994	(Sweden) Stefan Edberg	(Croatia) Goran Ivanišević	4–6, 6–4, 6–2, 6–2
Stuttgart	1995 (Feb)	(Netherlands) Richard Krajicek	(Germany) Michael Stich	7–6^{(7–4)}, 6–3, 6–7^{(6–8)}, 1–6, 6–3
↓ ATP Tour Masters 1000 (Note: Known as Championship Series, Single Week from 1990 till 1995, Super 9 from 1996 till 1999 and Tennis Masters Series from 2000 onwards) ↓
Essen	1995 (Oct)	(Austria) Thomas Muster	(United States) MaliVai Washington	7–6^{(8–6)}, 2–6, 6–3, 6–4
Stuttgart	1996	(Germany) Boris Becker	(United States) Pete Sampras	3–6, 6–3, 3–6, 6–3, 6–4
Stuttgart	1997	(Czech Republic) Petr Korda	(Netherlands) Richard Krajicek	7–6^{(8–6)}, 6–2, 6–4
Stuttgart	1998	(Netherlands) Richard Krajicek	(Russia) Yevgeny Kafelnikov	6–4, 6–3, 6–3
Stuttgart	1999	(Sweden) Thomas Enqvist	(Netherlands) Richard Krajicek	6–1, 6–4, 5–7, 7–5
Stuttgart	2000	(South Africa) Wayne Ferreira	(Australia) Lleyton Hewitt	7–6^{(8–6)}, 3–6, 6–7^{(5–7)}, 7–6^{(7–2)}, 6–2
Stuttgart	2001	(Germany) Tommy Haas	(Belarus) Max Mirnyi	6–2, 6–2, 6–2
	2002	succeeded by Madrid Open		

=== Doubles ===
Location	Year	Champions	Runners-up	Score
↓ ATP Tour 500 ↓
Stuttgart	1990	(France) Guy Forget (Switzerland) Jakob Hlasek	(Denmark) Michael Mortensen (Netherlands) Tom Nijssen	6–3, 6–2
Stuttgart	1991	(Spain) Sergio Casal (Spain) Emilio Sánchez	(United Kingdom) Jeremy Bates (United Kingdom) Nick Brown	6–3, 7–5
Stuttgart	1992	(Netherlands) Tom Nijssen (Czechoslovakia) Cyril Suk	(Australia) John Fitzgerald (Sweden) Anders Järryd	6–3, 6–7, 6–3
Stuttgart	1993	(Australia) Mark Kratzmann (Australia) Wally Masur	(United States) Steve DeVries (Australia) David Macpherson	6–3, 7–6
Stuttgart	1994	(South Africa) David Adams (Russia) Andrei Olhovskiy	(Canada) Grant Connell (United States) Patrick Galbraith	6–7, 6–4, 7–6
Stuttgart	1995 (Feb)	(Canada) Grant Connell (United States) Patrick Galbraith	(Czech Republic) Cyril Suk (Czech Republic) Daniel Vacek	6–2, 6–2
↓ ATP Tour Masters 1000 ↓
Essen	1995 (Oct)	(Netherlands) Jacco Eltingh (Netherlands) Paul Haarhuis	(Czech Republic) Cyril Suk (Czech Republic) Daniel Vacek	7–5, 6–4
Stuttgart	1996	(Canada) Sébastien Lareau (United States) Alex O'Brien	(Netherlands) Jacco Eltingh (Netherlands) Paul Haarhuis	3–6, 6–4, 6–3
Stuttgart	1997	(Australia) Mark Woodforde (Australia) Todd Woodbridge	(United States) Rick Leach (United States) Jonathan Stark	6–3, 6–3
Stuttgart	1998	(Canada) Sébastien Lareau (United States) Alex O'Brien	(India) Mahesh Bhupathi (India) Leander Paes	6–3, 3–6, 7–5
Stuttgart	1999	(Zimbabwe) Byron Black (Sweden) Jonas Björkman	(South Africa) David Adams (South Africa) John-Laffnie de Jager	6–7^{(6–8)}, 7–6^{(7–2)}, 6–0
Stuttgart	2000	(Czech Republic) Jiří Novák (Czech Republic) David Rikl	(United States) Donald Johnson (South Africa) Piet Norval	3–6, 6–3, 6–4
Stuttgart	2001	(Belarus) Max Mirnyi (Australia) Sandon Stolle	(South Africa) Ellis Ferreira (United States) Jeff Tarango	7–6^{(7–0)}, 7–6^{(7–4)}
	2002	succeeded by Madrid Open		

=== Exhibition ===
Location	Year	Champions	Runners-up	Score
Stuttgart	1988	(Czechoslovakia) Miloslav Mečíř	(Ecuador) Andrés Gómez	6–3, 6–2
Stuttgart	1989	(Czechoslovakia) Ivan Lendl	(Czechoslovakia) Miloslav Mečíř	6–3, 4–6, 4–6, 6–1, 6–4
