= 1991 Stockholm Open =

- Date: 21–28 October
- Edition: 23rd
- Category: ATP Championship Series
- Draw: 48S / 24D
- Prize money: $840,000 (Note: Total financial commitment for the tournament: $1,100,000.)
- Surface: Carpet / indoor
- Location: Stockholm, Sweden
- Venue: Stockholm Globe Arena

Champions

Singles
- (Germany) Boris Becker

Doubles
- (Australia) John Fitzgerald / (Sweden) Anders Järryd
- Stockholm Open

The 1991 Stockholm Open was a men's tennis tournament played on indoor carpet courts. It was the 23rd edition of the Stockholm Open and was part of the ATP Championship Series of the 1991 ATP Tour. It took place at the Stockholm Globe Arena in Stockholm, Sweden, from 21 October through 28 October 1991. Second-seed Boris Becker won the singles title, his second consecutive win at the event and his third overall after winning in 1990 and 1988.

The singles draw was headlined by Stefan Edberg. Other top seeds were Boris Becker, Jim Courier and Michael Stich.

== Finals ==
=== Singles ===
(Germany) Boris Becker defeated (Sweden) Stefan Edberg, 3–6, 6–4, 1–6, 6–2, 6–2

- It was Becker's 2nd title of the year, and his 31st overall. It was his 1st Masters title of the year and his 2nd overall.

=== Doubles ===
(Australia) John Fitzgerald / (Sweden) Anders Järryd defeated (Netherlands) Tom Nijssen / (Czechoslovakia) Cyril Suk, 7–5, 6–2
