= 1989 Stockholm Open =

Men's tennis tournament

- Date: 6–12 November
- Edition: 21st
- Category: Grand Prix
- Draw: 48S / 28D
- Prize money: $832,500
- Surface: Carpet / indoor
- Location: Stockholm, Sweden
- Venue: Stockholm Globe Arena

Champions

Singles
- (Czechoslovakia) Ivan Lendl

Doubles
- (Mexico) Jorge Lozano / (United States) Todd Witsken
← 1988 ·	Stockholm Open	· 1990 →

The 1989 Stockholm Open was a men's tennis tournament played on indoor carpet courts at the Stockholm Globe Arena in Stockholm, Sweden, that was part of the 1989 Nabisco Grand Prix. It was the 21st edition of the tournament and was held from 6 November until 12 November 1989. First-seeded Ivan Lendl won the singles title.

== Finals ==
=== Singles ===
(Czechoslovakia) Ivan Lendl defeated (Sweden) Magnus Gustafsson 7–5, 6–0, 6–3

- It was Lendl's 10th title of the year and the 88th of his career.

=== Doubles ===
(Mexico) Jorge Lozano / (United States) Todd Witsken defeated (United States) Rick Leach / (United States) Jim Pugh 6–3, 5–7, 6–3

- It was Lozano's 2nd title of the year and the 6th of his career. It was Witsken's 4th title of the year and the 8th of his career.
