= 1989 Stockholm Open – Doubles =

Doubles
- 1989 Stockholm Open

Final
- Champions: (Mexico) Jorge Lozano; (United States) Todd Witsken
- Runners-up: (United States) Rick Leach; (United States) Jim Pugh
- Score: 6–3, 5–7, 6–3

Events
Singles	Doubles
← 1988 ·	Stockholm Open	· 1990 →

Kevin Curren and Jim Grabb were the defending champions but only Grabb competed that year with Patrick McEnroe.

Grabb and McEnroe lost in the semifinals to Jorge Lozano and Todd Witsken.

Lozano and Witsken won in the final 6–3, 5–7, 6–3 against Rick Leach and Jim Pugh.

== Seeds ==
All eight seeded teams received byes to the second round.

1. (United States) Rick Leach / (United States) Jim Pugh (final)
2. (United States) Jim Grabb / (United States) Patrick McEnroe (semifinals)
3. (West Germany) Boris Becker / (Czechoslovakia) Tomáš Šmíd (second round)
4. (United States) Tim Pawsat / (Australia) Laurie Warder (second round)
5. (United States) Jim Courier / (United States) Pete Sampras (quarterfinals)
6. (Mexico) Jorge Lozano / (United States) Todd Witsken (champions)
7. (Sweden) Jan Gunnarsson / (Sweden) Anders Järryd (quarterfinals)
8. (Denmark) Michael Mortensen / (Netherlands) Tom Nijssen (quarterfinals)

== Draw ==
=== Key ===
- Q = Qualifier
- WC = Wild card
- LL = Lucky loser
- Alt = Alternate
- ITF = ITF entry
- PR = Protected ranking
- SR = Special ranking
- SE = Special exempt
- JE = Junior exempt
- JR = Junior Accelerator Programme entrant
- CO = College Accelerator Programme entrant
- NG = Next Gen Accelerator Program entrant
- w/o = Walkover
- r = Retired
- d = Defaulted

=== Final ===
Semifinals

Final

1
- (United States) Rick Leach
- (United States) Jim Pugh
6
6

- (United States) Paul Chamberlin
- (United States) Tim Wilkison
4
4

1
- (United States) Rick Leach
- (United States) Jim Pugh
3
7
3

6
- (Mexico) Jorge Lozano
- (United States) Todd Witsken
6
5
6

6
- (Mexico) Jorge Lozano
- (United States) Todd Witsken
6
4
6

2
- (United States) Jim Grabb
- (United States) Patrick McEnroe
3
6
1

=== Top half ===
First round

Second round

Quarterfinals

Semifinals

1
- (United States) R Leach
- (United States) J Pugh
6
7

- (Sweden) D Engel
- (Sweden) M Gustafsson
6
0

- (United States) P Galbraith
- (United States) D Wheaton
2
6

- (United States) P Galbraith
- (United States) D Wheaton
7
6

1
- (United States) R Leach
- (United States) J Pugh
6
6

- (Sweden) F Nilsson
- (United States) B Willenborg
4
6

7
- (Sweden) J Gunnarsson
- (Sweden) A Järryd
3
2

- (Iran) M Bahrami
- (West Germany) R Osterthun
6
7

- (Iran) M Bahrami
- (West Germany) R Osterthun
3
6

7
- (Sweden) J Gunnarsson
- (Sweden) A Järryd
6
7

1
- (United States) R Leach
- (United States) J Pugh
6
6

- (United States) P Chamberlin
- (United States) T Wilkison
4
4

4
- (United States) T Pawsat
- (Australia) L Warder
1
3

- (United States) P Chamberlin
- (United States) T Wilkison
4
6
7

- (United States) P Chamberlin
- (United States) T Wilkison
6
6

- (Sweden) P Henricsson
- (Sweden) J Windahl
6
2
5

- (United States) P Chamberlin
- (United States) T Wilkison
6
6

- (Czechoslovakia) K Nováček
- (Czechoslovakia) M Šrejber
6
1
5

5
- (United States) J Courier
- (United States) P Sampras
4
4

- (Spain) T Carbonell
- (Austria) H Skoff
3
6
7

- (Spain) T Carbonell
- (Austria) H Skoff
2
4

5
- (United States) J Courier
- (United States) P Sampras
6
6

=== Bottom half ===
First round

Second round

Quarterfinals

Semifinals

6
- (Mexico) J Lozano
- (United States) T Witsken
6
6

- (Sweden) S Edberg
- (Sweden) M Wilander
4
6
7

- (Sweden) S Edberg
- (Sweden) M Wilander
4
2

- (Sweden) R Båthman
- (Sweden) P Svensson
6
4
5

6
- (Mexico) J Lozano
- (United States) T Witsken
6
6

- (Australia) B Dyke
- (United States) G Van Emburgh
6
6

- (Australia) B Dyke
- (United States) G Van Emburgh
4
2

- (Austria) A Antonitsch
- (West Germany) U Riglewski
3
4

- (Australia) B Dyke
- (United States) G Van Emburgh
6
6

3
- (West Germany) B Becker
- (Czechoslovakia) T Šmíd
4
4

6
- (Mexico) J Lozano
- (United States) T Witsken
6
4
6

2
- (United States) J Grabb
- (United States) P McEnroe
3
6
1

8
- (Denmark) M Mortensen
- (Netherlands) T Nijssen
6
5
6

- (Sweden) P Lundgren
- (Sweden) M Pernfors
6
6
7

- (Sweden) P Lundgren
- (Sweden) M Pernfors
0
7
3

(Switzerland) H Günthardt
(Socialist Federal Republic of Yugoslavia) S Živojinović
4
7
5

8
- (Denmark) M Mortensen
- (Netherlands) T Nijssen
2
6
6

- (United States) G Layendecker
- (United States) R Reneberg
1
6
6

2
- (United States) J Grabb
- (United States) P McEnroe
6
4
7

- (United States) T Nelson
- (Sweden) T Svantesson
6
2
4

- (United States) G Layendecker
- (United States) R Reneberg
6
3
5

2
- (United States) J Grabb
- (United States) P McEnroe
4
6
7
