= 1991 Stockholm Open – Singles =

Singles
- 1991 Stockholm Open

Final
- Champion: (Germany) Boris Becker
- Runner-up: (Sweden) Stefan Edberg
- Score: 3–6, 6–4, 1–6, 6–2, 6–2

Details
- Draw: 48
- Seeds: 16

Events
Singles	Doubles
← 1990 ·	Stockholm Open	· 1992 →

Defending champion Boris Becker defeated Stefan Edberg in a rematch of the previous year's final, 3–6, 6–4, 1–6, 6–2, 6–2 to win the singles tennis title at the 1991 Stockholm Open.

== Seeds ==
1. (Sweden) Stefan Edberg (final)
2. (Germany) Boris Becker (champion)
3. (United States) Jim Courier (semifinals)
4. (Germany) Michael Stich (second round)
5. (Czechoslovakia) Ivan Lendl (third round)
6. (France) Guy Forget (third round)
7. (United States) Pete Sampras (quarterfinals)
8. (Spain) Sergi Bruguera (second round)
9. (Czechoslovakia) Karel Nováček (third round)
10. (United States) David Wheaton (second round)
11. (Czechoslovakia) Petr Korda (quarterfinals)
12. (Socialist Federal Republic of Yugoslavia) Goran Ivanišević (quarterfinals, retired)
13. (United States) Derrick Rostagno (third round)
14. (Switzerland) Jakob Hlasek (third round)
15. (Socialist Federal Republic of Yugoslavia) Goran Prpić (third round)
16. (United States) Brad Gilbert (third round)

== Draw ==
=== Key ===
- Q = Qualifier
- WC = Wild card
- LL = Lucky loser
- Alt = Alternate
- SE = Special exempt
- PR = Protected ranking
- ITF = ITF entry
- JE = Junior exempt
- w/o = Walkover
- r = Retired
- d = Defaulted
- SR = Special ranking

=== Finals ===
Quarterfinals
1	(Sweden) Stefan Edberg	6	2	6
(United States) Richey Reneberg	3	6	3
(United States) Aaron Krickstein	7^{10}	1
12	(Socialist Federal Republic of Yugoslavia) Goran Ivanišević	6^{8}	0^{r}
11	(Czechoslovakia) Petr Korda	4	4
3	(United States) Jim Courier	6	6
7	(United States) Pete Sampras	5	5
2	(Germany) Boris Becker	7	7

Semifinals
1	(Sweden) Stefan Edberg	6	6
(United States) Aaron Krickstein	2	2
3	(United States) Jim Courier	7^{7}	3	4
2	(Germany) Boris Becker	6^{4}	6	6

Final
1	(Sweden) Stefan Edberg	6	4	6	2	2
2	(Germany) Boris Becker	3	6	1	6	6

=== Top half ===
==== Section 1 ====
First round
WC	(Sweden) P Lundgren	6	6
(Netherlands) M Koevermans	3	2
(United States) P McEnroe	6^{3}	6	6
(Austria) H Skoff	7^{7}	3	3
(Australia) W Masur	6	6
WC	(Sweden) J Gunnarsson	4	4
(Soviet Union) A Volkov	4	2
(United States) R Reneberg	6	6

Second round
1	(Sweden) S Edberg	6	6
WC	(Sweden) P Lundgren	3	4
(United States) P McEnroe	2	2
16	(United States) B Gilbert	6	6
9	(Czechoslovakia) K Nováček	6	6^{1}	6
(Australia) W Masur	4	7^{7}	4
(United States) R Reneberg	7^{7}	1	6
8	(Spain) S Bruguera	6^{4}	6	1

Third round
1	(Sweden) S Edberg	6	6
16	(United States) B Gilbert	2	3
9	(Czechoslovakia) K Nováček	6	3	3
(United States) R Reneberg	2	6	6

Quarterfinals
1	(Sweden) S Edberg	6	2	6
(United States) R Reneberg	3	6	3

==== Section 2 ====
First round
Q	(Belgium) L Pimek	2	6	6^{6}
(United States) A Krickstein	6	2	7^{8}
(France) T Champion	5	3
(Netherlands) J Siemerink	7	6
(Sweden) M Larsson	6	6
Q	(Sweden) R Bergh	2	1
(Haiti) R Agénor	6	6
(Switzerland) M Rosset	4	3

Second round
4	(Germany) M Stich	7^{8}	6^{4}	0
(United States) A Krickstein	6^{6}	7^{7}	6
(Netherlands) J Siemerink	6	6^{6}	6^{4}
14	(Switzerland) J Hlasek	4	7^{8}	7^{7}
12	(Socialist Federal Republic of Yugoslavia) G Ivanišević	7	6^{4}	7
(Sweden) M Larsson	5	7^{7}	5
(Haiti) R Agénor	3	2
6	(France) G Forget	6	6

Third round
(United States) A Krickstein	6	3	6
14	(Switzerland) J Hlasek	2	6	2
12	(Socialist Federal Republic of Yugoslavia) G Ivanišević	7^{15}	7^{7}
6	(France) G Forget	6^{13}	6^{5}

Quarterfinals
(United States) A Krickstein	7^{10}	1
12	(Socialist Federal Republic of Yugoslavia) G Ivanišević	6^{8}	0^{r}

==== Section 3 ====
First round
WC	(Sweden) T Enqvist	6^{5}	3
(Australia) T Woodbridge	7^{7}	6
(Soviet Union) A Cherkasov	3	5
(Sweden) C Bergström	6	7
Q	(Sweden) H Holm	3	6^{2}
(Sweden) A Järryd	6	7^{7}
(Germany) C-U Steeb	6^{3}	6	6
(Argentina) A Mancini	7^{7}	3	4

Second round
5	(Czechoslovakia) I Lendl	7	6
(Australia) T Woodbridge	5	2
(Sweden) C Bergström	7^{7}	6^{5}	3
11	(Czechoslovakia) P Korda	6^{4}	7^{7}	6
13	(United States) D Rostagno	3
(Sweden) A Järryd	0^{r}
(Germany) C-U Steeb	4	4
3	(United States) J Courier	6	6

Third round
5	(Czechoslovakia) I Lendl	7	1	4
11	(Czechoslovakia) P Korda	5	6	6
13	(United States) D Rostagno	5	1
3	(United States) J Courier	7	6

Quarterfinals
11	(Czechoslovakia) P Korda	4	4
3	(United States) J Courier	6	6

==== Section 4 ====
First round
(Sweden) J Svensson	5	6	1
Q	(Sweden) T Högstedt	7	4	6
Q	(Sweden) D Engel	5	6	6
(Sweden) N Kulti	7	4	2
WC	(United States) J Connors	6	7^{7}
(Argentina) M Jaite	3	6^{5}
(Italy) O Camporese	6	6
Q	(United States) R Leach	4	2

Second round
7	(United States) P Sampras	7^{9}	6^{7}	6
Q	(Sweden) T Högstedt	6^{7}	7^{9}	3
Q	(Sweden) D Engel	4	6	7^{7}
10	(United States) D Wheaton	6	4	6^{5}
15	(Socialist Federal Republic of Yugoslavia) G Prpić	7^{8}	6^{5}	6
WC	(United States) J Connors	6^{6}	7^{7}	1
(Italy) O Camporese	6	5	3
2	(Germany) B Becker	4	7	6

Third round
7	(United States) P Sampras	6^{1}	6	6
Q	(Sweden) D Engel	7^{7}	2	4
15	(Socialist Federal Republic of Yugoslavia) G Prpić	6^{3}	1
2	(Germany) B Becker	7^{7}	6

Quarterfinals
7	(United States) P Sampras	5	5
2	(Germany) B Becker	7	7
