= 1988 Stockholm Open – Doubles =

Doubles
- 1988 Stockholm Open

Final
- Champions: (United States) Kevin Curren (United States) Jim Grabb
- Runners-up: (United States) Paul Annacone (Australia) John Fitzgerald
- Score: 7–5, 6–4

Events
Singles	Doubles
← 1987 ·	Stockholm Open	· 1989 →

Stefan Edberg and Anders Järryd were the defending champions, but lost in the second round.

Kevin Curren and Jim Grabb won the title, defeating Paul Annacone and John Fitzgerald 7–5, 6–4 in the final.

== Seeds ==
1. (United States) Ken Flach / (United States) Robert Seguso (second round)
2. (United States) Rick Leach / (United States) Jim Pugh (semifinals)
3. (Spain) Sergio Casal / (Spain) Emilio Sánchez (quarterfinals)
4. (Mexico) Jorge Lozano / (United States) Todd Witsken (quarterfinals)
5. (United States) Kevin Curren / (United States) Jim Grabb (champions)
6. (United States) Paul Annacone / (Australia) John Fitzgerald (final)
7. (Sweden) Stefan Edberg / (Sweden) Anders Järryd (second round)
8. (New Zealand) Kelly Evernden / (United States) Johan Kriek (second round)

== Draw ==
=== Key ===
- Q = Qualifier
- WC = Wild card
- LL = Lucky loser
- Alt = Alternate
- SE = Special exempt
- PR = Protected ranking
- ITF = ITF entry
- JE = Junior exempt
- w/o = Walkover
- r = Retired
- d = Defaulted
- SR = Special ranking

=== Finals ===
Semifinals
(West Germany) Boris Becker (West Germany) Eric Jelen
6	(United States) Paul Annacone (Australia) John Fitzgerald	w/o
5	(United States) Kevin Curren (United States) Jim Grabb	6	6
2	(United States) Rick Leach (United States) Jim Pugh	1	4

Final
6	(United States) Paul Annacone (Australia) John Fitzgerald	5	4
5	(United States) Kevin Curren (United States) Jim Grabb	7	6

=== Top half ===
First round
(Australia) B Dyke (Netherlands) T Nijssen	6	4	6
(Australia) B Drewett (Switzerland) H Günthardt	1	6	4
(West Germany) B Becker (West Germany) E Jelen	6	6
(Sweden) M Pernfors (Sweden) M Wilander	3	3
(United States) D Goldie (United States) R Reneberg	2	4
8	(New Zealand) K Evernden (United States) J Kriek	6	6
(Sweden) J Gunnarsson (Sweden) N Kroon	4	3
(West Germany) C Saceanu (United States) B Willenborg	6	6
(Sweden) R Båthman (Sweden) R Bergh	6	1	6
(Canada) G Connell (Canada) G Michibata	4	6	3
(United States) E Korita (United States) J Levine	4	1
6	(United States) P Annacone (Australia) J Fitzgerald	6	6

Second round
1	(United States) K Flach (United States) R Seguso	6	3	4
(Australia) B Dyke (Netherlands) T Nijssen	1	6	6
(West Germany) B Becker (West Germany) E Jelen	7	6
8	(New Zealand) K Evernden (United States) J Kriek	5	4
3	(Spain) S Casal (Spain) E Sánchez	1	6	6
(West Germany) C Saceanu (United States) B Willenborg	6	4	4
(Sweden) R Båthman (Sweden) R Bergh	7	4	2
6	(United States) P Annacone (Australia) J Fitzgerald	6	6	6

Quarterfinals
(Australia) B Dyke (Netherlands) T Nijssen	4	4
(West Germany) B Becker (West Germany) E Jelen	6	6
3	(Spain) S Casal (Spain) E Sánchez	7	5	4
6	(United States) P Annacone (Australia) J Fitzgerald	5	7	6

Semifinals
(West Germany) B Becker (West Germany) E Jelen
6	(United States) P Annacone (Australia) J Fitzgerald	w/o

=== Bottom half ===
First round
5	(United States) K Curren (United States) J Grabb	3	7	6
(United Kingdom) J Bates (Sweden) P Lundgren	6	5	1
(Czechoslovakia) M Mečíř (Czechoslovakia) M Vajda	6	6	2
(West Germany) P Baur (West Germany) U Riglewski	7	4	6
(West Germany) T Meinecke (Sweden) J Svensson	3	6	7
(Socialist Federal Republic of Yugoslavia) G Ivanišević (Socialist Federal Republic of Yugoslavia) S Živojinović	6	4	6
7	(Sweden) S Edberg (Sweden) A Järryd	4	6	6
(Czechoslovakia) S Birner (Czechoslovakia) J Čihák	6	2	3
(United States) K Jones (Denmark) M Mortensen	6	5	1
(West Germany) P Kühnen (West Germany) C-U Steeb	1	7	6
(Sweden) M Gustafsson (Sweden) J Windahl	3	4
(United States) J Rive (United States) L Shiras	6	6

Second round
5	(United States) K Curren (United States) J Grabb	6	6
(West Germany) P Baur (West Germany) U Riglewski	2	1
(West Germany) T Meinecke (Sweden) J Svensson	2	4
4	(Mexico) J Lozano (United States) T Witsken	6	6
7	(Sweden) S Edberg (Sweden) A Järryd	6	6	4
(West Germany) P Kühnen (West Germany) C-U Steeb	7	4	6
(United States) J Rive (United States) L Shiras	2	7	4
2	(United States) R Leach (United States) J Pugh	6	5	6

Quarterfinals
5	(United States) K Curren (United States) J Grabb	7	7
4	(Mexico) J Lozano (United States) T Witsken	5	5
(West Germany) P Kühnen (West Germany) C-U Steeb	2	6	3
2	(United States) R Leach (United States) J Pugh	6	3	6

Semifinals
5	(United States) K Curren (United States) J Grabb	6	6
2	(United States) R Leach (United States) J Pugh	1	4
