= 1989 Stockholm Open – Singles =

Singles
- 1989 Stockholm Open

Final
- Champion: (Czechoslovakia) Ivan Lendl
- Runner-up: (Sweden) Magnus Gustafsson
- Score: 7–5, 6–0, 6–3

Details
- Draw: 48
- Seeds: 16

Events
Singles	Doubles
← 1988 ·	Stockholm Open	· 1990 →

Boris Becker was the defending champion but lost in the third round to Jan Gunnarsson.

Ivan Lendl won in the final 7–5, 6–0, 6–3 against Magnus Gustafsson.

== Seeds ==
All sixteen seeds received a bye to the second round.

1. (Czechoslovakia) Ivan Lendl (champion)
2. (West Germany) Boris Becker (third round)
3. (Sweden) Stefan Edberg (semifinals)
4. (United States) Andre Agassi (quarterfinals)
5. (United States) Aaron Krickstein (third round)
6. (Argentina) Alberto Mancini (second round)
7. (United States) Tim Mayotte (quarterfinals)
8. (Sweden) Mats Wilander (semifinals)
9. (France) Yannick Noah (second round)
10. (Austria) Thomas Muster (third round)
11. (United States) Jim Courier (quarterfinals)
12. (Italy) Paolo Canè (second round)
13. (Austria) Horst Skoff (third round)
14. (Socialist Federal Republic of Yugoslavia) Goran Prpić (second round)
15. (Sweden) Jan Gunnarsson (quarterfinals)
16. (Sweden) Anders Järryd (third round)

== Draw ==
=== Key ===
- Q = Qualifier
- WC = Wild card
- LL = Lucky loser
- Alt = Alternate
- ITF = ITF entry
- PR = Protected ranking
- SR = Special ranking
- SE = Special exempt
- JE = Junior exempt
- JR = Junior Accelerator Programme entrant
- CO = College Accelerator Programme entrant
- NG = Next Gen Accelerator Program entrant
- w/o = Walkover
- r = Retired
- d = Defaulted

=== Finals ===
Semifinals
1	(Czechoslovakia) Ivan Lendl	6	2	6
3	(Sweden) Stefan Edberg	0	6	3
(Sweden) Magnus Gustafsson	7	6
8	(Sweden) Mats Wilander	6	4

Final
1	(Czechoslovakia) Ivan Lendl	7	6	6
(Sweden) Magnus Gustafsson	5	0	3

=== Top half ===
==== Section 1 ====
First round
(United States) R Reneberg	7	4	5
(Sweden) M Pernfors	6	6	7
WC	(Sweden) N Kulti	6	6
(Czechoslovakia) K Nováček	3	3
(West Germany) J Wöhrmann	6	6
(Spain) J Arrese	4	2
(Sweden) N Kroon	3	6	6
(United States) J Grabb	6	4	3

Second round
1	(Czechoslovakia) I Lendl	6	6
(Sweden) M Pernfors	3	2
WC	(Sweden) N Kulti	6	6	6
16	(Sweden) A Järryd	7	3	7
9	(France) Y Noah	4	6
(West Germany) J Wöhrmann	6	7
(Sweden) N Kroon	0	1
7	(United States) T Mayotte	6	6

Third round
1	(Czechoslovakia) I Lendl	6	6
16	(Sweden) A Järryd	0	2
(West Germany) J Wöhrmann	1	1
7	(United States) T Mayotte	6	6

Quarterfinals
1	(Czechoslovakia) I Lendl	6	6
7	(United States) T Mayotte	2	2

==== Section 2 ====
First round
(Spain) J Aguilera	4	4
(Socialist Federal Republic of Yugoslavia) S Živojinović	6	6
(United States) R Matuszewski	7	6	1
(United States) D Wheaton	6	7	6
(United States) T Witsken	6	7
(United States) P Chamberlin	3	5
Q	(Sweden) R Båthman	6	7
(Socialist Federal Republic of Yugoslavia) B Orešar	3	6

Second round
3	(Sweden) S Edberg	6	6
(Socialist Federal Republic of Yugoslavia) S Živojinović	3	1
(United States) D Wheaton	6	2	5
13	(Austria) H Skoff	3	6	7
11	(United States) J Courier	7	6
(United States) T Witsken	6	2
Q	(Sweden) R Båthman	0	7	3
5	(United States) A Krickstein	6	6	6

Third round
3	(Sweden) S Edberg	7	6
13	(Austria) H Skoff	5	0
11	(United States) J Courier	6	1
5	(United States) A Krickstein	2	0^{r}

Quarterfinals
3	(Sweden) S Edberg	3	6	6
11	(United States) J Courier	6	3	4

=== Bottom half ===
==== Section 3 ====
First round
(Sweden) P Lundgren	6	6
(United States) P Sampras	4	4
Q	(Netherlands) T Nijssen	6	4	1
(Sweden) M Gustafsson	3	6	6
(Sweden) J Svensson	6	6
(Spain) T Carbonell	4	0
(Haiti) R Agénor	4	5
Q	(Czechoslovakia) M Šrejber	6	7

Second round
6	(Argentina) A Mancini	3	2
(Sweden) P Lundgren	6	6
(Sweden) M Gustafsson	3	7	6
12	(Italy) P Canè	6	5	4
14	(Socialist Federal Republic of Yugoslavia) G Prpić	2	4
(Sweden) J Svensson	6	6
Q	(Czechoslovakia) M Šrejber	4	3
4	(United States) A Agassi	6	6

Third round
(Sweden) P Lundgren	5	1
(Sweden) M Gustafsson	7	6
(Sweden) J Svensson	3	1
4	(United States) A Agassi	6	6

Quarterfinals
(Sweden) M Gustafsson	6	7
4	(United States) A Agassi	2	6

==== Section 4 ====
First round
Q	(West Germany) U Riglewski	6	6
(Austria) A Antonitsch	4	2
(Sweden) C Bergström	4	6	5
Q	(Sweden) T Högstedt	6	1	7
Q	(Sweden) P Nyborg	3	6	6
(France) J Potier	6	3	4
(United States) J Pugh	6	6
(United States) G Layendecker	3	0

Second round
8	(Sweden) M Wilander	5	6	6
Q	(West Germany) U Riglewski	7	2	2
Q	(Sweden) T Högstedt	6	3	4
10	(Austria) T Muster	4	6	6
15	(Sweden) J Gunnarsson	6	6
Q	(Sweden) P Nyborg	3	1
(United States) J Pugh	6	0	4
2	(West Germany) B Becker	3	6	6

Third round
8	(Sweden) M Wilander	6	6	6
10	(Austria) T Muster	4	7	4
15	(Sweden) J Gunnarsson	6	7
2	(West Germany) B Becker	3	5

Quarterfinals
8	(Sweden) M Wilander	6	6
15	(Sweden) J Gunnarsson	3	0
