= 1987 Stockholm Open – Singles =

Singles
- 1987 Stockholm Open

Final
- Champion: (Sweden) Stefan Edberg
- Runner-up: (Sweden) Jonas Svensson
- Score: 7–5, 6–2, 4–6, 6–4

Details
- Draw: 56
- Seeds: 16

Events
Singles	Doubles
← 1986 ·	Stockholm Open	· 1988 →

Stefan Edberg was the defending champion.

Edberg successfully defended his title, defeating Jonas Svensson 7–5, 6–2, 4–6, 6–4 in the final.

== Seeds ==
1. (Sweden) Stefan Edberg (champion)
2. (Sweden) Mats Wilander (second round)
3. (Sweden) Joakim Nyström (third round)
4. (Spain) Emilio Sánchez (second round)
5. (Sweden) Anders Järryd (semifinals)
6. (Sweden) Mikael Pernfors (second round)
7. (Sweden) Jonas Svensson (final)
8. (Sweden) Peter Lundgren (quarterfinals)
9. (New Zealand) Kelly Evernden (second round)
10. (United States) Jimmy Arias (third round)
11. (Sweden) Jan Gunnarsson (second round)
12. (United States) Jim Pugh (first round)
13. (Italy) Paolo Canè (second round)
14. (United States) Tim Wilkison (first round)
15. (Spain) Sergio Casal (third round)
16. (Sweden) Ulf Stenlund (third round)

== Draw ==
=== Key ===
- Q = Qualifier
- WC = Wild card
- LL = Lucky loser
- Alt = Alternate
- SE = Special exempt
- PR = Protected ranking
- ITF = ITF entry
- JE = Junior exempt
- w/o = Walkover
- r = Retired
- d = Defaulted
- SR = Special ranking

=== Finals ===
Semifinals
1	(Sweden) Stefan Edberg	6	6
5	(Sweden) Anders Järryd	4	2
WC	(Sweden) Magnus Gustafsson	3	4
7	(Sweden) Jonas Svensson	6	6

Final
1	(Sweden) Stefan Edberg	7	6	4	6
7	(Sweden) Jonas Svensson	5	2	6	4

=== Top half ===
==== Section 1 ====
First round
(United States) S Giammalva Jr.	4	4
(United States) R Reneberg	6	6
WC	(United States) T Nelson	4	6	4
LL	(United States) M Dickson	6	4	6
SE	(Australia) J Fitzgerald	6	5	4
16	(Sweden) U Stenlund	3	7	6
10	(United States) J Arias	7	6
(United States) D Rostagno	6	3
(Spain) A Tous	6	7
(West Germany) P Vojtischek	3	6
(United States) B Testerman	3	6	6
(United States) K Jones	6	3	4

Second round
1	(Sweden) S Edberg	6	6	6
(United States) R Reneberg	7	0	2
LL	(United States) M Dickson	4	6	1
16	(Sweden) U Stenlund	6	3	6
10	(United States) J Arias	4	6	6
(Spain) A Tous	6	4	4
(United States) B Testerman	5	3
8	(Sweden) P Lundgren	7	6

Third round
1	(Sweden) S Edberg	7	6
16	(Sweden) U Stenlund	6	3
10	(United States) J Arias	5	6	4
8	(Sweden) P Lundgren	7	3	6

Quarterfinals
1	(Sweden) S Edberg	6	7
8	(Sweden) P Lundgren	1	6

==== Section 2 ====
First round
(West Germany) A Maurer	3	4
(Sweden) C Bergström	6	6
(Czechoslovakia) K Nováček	3	6
Q	(Canada) M Laurendeau	6	7
WC	(Sweden) J Windahl	1	3
13	(Italy) P Canè	6	6
12	(United States) J Pugh	2	1
(United States) D Goldie	6	6
(Argentina) H de la Peña	6	2	5
SE	(United Kingdom) J Bates	4	6	7
(Nigeria) N Odizor	6	5	6
(West Germany) R Osterthun	3	7	4

Second round
4	(Spain) E Sánchez	1	5
(Sweden) C Bergström	6	7
Q	(Canada) M Laurendeau	6	7
13	(Italy) P Canè	2	6
(United States) D Goldie	6	4	4
SE	(United Kingdom) J Bates	4	6	6
(Nigeria) N Odizor	3	4
5	(Sweden) A Järryd	6	6

Third round
(Sweden) C Bergström	6	4
Q	(Canada) M Laurendeau	7	6
SE	(United Kingdom) J Bates	1	1
5	(Sweden) A Järryd	6	6

Quarterfinals
Q	(Canada) M Laurendeau	2	4
5	(Sweden) A Järryd	6	6

=== Bottom half ===
==== Section 3 ====
First round
WC	(Sweden) M Gustafsson	4	6	6
(Italy) F Cancellotti	6	3	2
(West Germany) E Jelen	6	3	6
Q	(Sweden) L-A Wahlgren	2	6	3
Q	(West Germany) M Westphal	3	4
11	(Sweden) J Gunnarsson	6	6
14	(United States) T Wilkison	6	7	4
(Czechoslovakia) M Šrejber	7	5	6
(West Germany) P Kühnen	3	7	2
(United States) M Anger	6	5	6
(United States) J Rive	6	6	7
(Czechoslovakia) J Navrátil	4	7	6

Second round
6	(Sweden) M Pernfors	2	2
WC	(Sweden) M Gustafsson	6	6
(West Germany) E Jelen	2	7	7
11	(Sweden) J Gunnarsson	6	5	6
(Czechoslovakia) M Šrejber	6	3
(United States) M Anger	7	6
(United States) J Rive	2	1
3	(Sweden) J Nyström	6	6

Third round
WC	(Sweden) M Gustafsson	7	6
(West Germany) E Jelen	6	2
(United States) M Anger	6	3	6
3	(Sweden) J Nyström	3	6	1

Quarterfinals
WC	(Sweden) M Gustafsson	6	6
(United States) M Anger	2	4

==== Section 4 ====
First round
WC	(United States) R Seguso	4	2
Q	(Austria) A Antonitsch	6	6
(Belgium) L Pimek	7	6
(Spain) J Sánchez	6	3
Q	(United States) B Pearce	4	5
9	(New Zealand) K Evernden	6	7
15	(Spain) S Casal	6	6	6
(United States) P Fleming	3	7	1
(Sweden) J Carlsson	7	6
Q	(United States) M Purcell	6	3
Q	(Sweden) T Högstedt	6	6
(United States) J Grabb	7	7

Second round
7	(Sweden) J Svensson	3	6	6
Q	(Austria) A Antonitsch	6	3	1
(Belgium) L Pimek	6	7
9	(New Zealand) K Evernden	3	6
15	(Spain) S Casal	6	6	7
(Sweden) J Carlsson	3	7	5
(United States) J Grabb	7	6
2	(Sweden) M Wilander	5	4

Third round
7	(Sweden) J Svensson	6	6
(Belgium) L Pimek	3	2
15	(Spain) S Casal	6	6	3
(United States) J Grabb	7	4	6

Quarterfinals
7	(Sweden) J Svensson	6	6
(United States) J Grabb	1	3
