= 1992 Australian Men's Hardcourt Championships – Doubles =

Doubles
- 1992 Australian Men's Hardcourt Championships

Final
- Champions: (Croatia) Goran Ivanišević (Switzerland) Marc Rosset
- Runners-up: (Australia) Mark Kratzmann (Australia) Jason Stoltenberg
- Score: 7–6, 7–6

Events
Singles	Doubles
- Australian Men's Hardcourt Championships

Wayne Ferreira and Stefan Kruger were the defending champions, but Ferreira did not participate this year. Kruger partnered Cyril Suk, losingin the first round.

Goran Ivanišević and Marc Rosset won the title, defeating Mark Kratzmann and Jason Stoltenberg 7–6, 7–6 in the final.

== Seeds ==
1. (United States) Luke Jensen / (Australia) Laurie Warder (first round)
2. (Spain) Sergio Casal / (Spain) Javier Sánchez (semifinals)
3. (Sweden) Stefan Edberg / (Australia) John Fitzgerald (quarterfinals)
4. (South Africa) Stefan Kruger / (Czechoslovakia) Cyril Suk (first round)

== Draw ==
Key

- Q = Qualifier
- WC = Wild card
- LL = Lucky loser
- Alt = Alternate
- ITF = ITF entry
- PR = Protected ranking
- SR = Special ranking
- SE = Special exempt
- JE = Junior exempt
- JR = Junior Accelerator Programme entrant
- CO = College Accelerator Programme entrant
- NG = Next Gen Accelerator Program entrant
- w/o = Walkover
- r = Retired
- d = Defaulted

=== Draw ===
First round
1	(United States) L Jensen (Australia) L Warder	6	3
(Australia) M Kratzmann (Australia) J Stoltenberg	7	6
WC	(Germany) C-U Steeb (Croatia) S Živojinović	7	6
(Australia) B Dyke (Australia) D Macpherson	6	4
4	(South Africa) S Kruger (Czechoslovakia) C Suk	4	4
(United States) B Shelton (South Africa) B Talbot	6	6
(Italy) S Pescosolido (Italy) G Pozzi	6	7
(Australia) S Stolle (Australia) M Woodforde	4	6
(Kenya) P Wekesa (Australia) S Youl	6	3
(Croatia) G Ivanišević (Switzerland) M Rosset	7	6
(United States) M Jensen (South Africa) G Stafford	6	4
3	(Sweden) S Edberg (Australia) J Fitzgerald	7	6
LL	(Australia) R Rasheed (Sweden) L-A Wahlgren	7	6
(Germany) U Riglewski (South Africa) C van Rensburg	6	4
(Sweden) R Båthman (Sweden) R Bergh	1	3
2	(Spain) S Casal (Spain) J Sánchez	6	6

Quarterfinals
(Australia) M Kratzmann (Australia) J Stoltenberg	6	6
WC	(Germany) C-U Steeb (Croatia) S Živojinović	4	4
(United States) B Shelton (South Africa) B Talbot	6	6	4
(Italy) S Pescosolido (Italy) G Pozzi	3	7	6
(Croatia) G Ivanišević (Switzerland) M Rosset	6	6
3	(Sweden) S Edberg (Australia) J Fitzgerald	4	2
LL	(Australia) R Rasheed (Sweden) L-A Wahlgren	5	5
2	(Spain) S Casal (Spain) J Sánchez	7	7

Semifinals
(Australia) M Kratzmann (Australia) J Stoltenberg	6	6
(Italy) S Pescosolido (Italy) G Pozzi	3	3
(Croatia) G Ivanišević (Switzerland) M Rosset	3	7	7
2	(Spain) S Casal (Spain) J Sánchez	6	6	6

Final
(Australia) M Kratzmann (Australia) J Stoltenberg	6	6
(Croatia) G Ivanišević (Switzerland) M Rosset	7	7
