= Goran Ivanišević =

Croatian tennis player (born 1971)

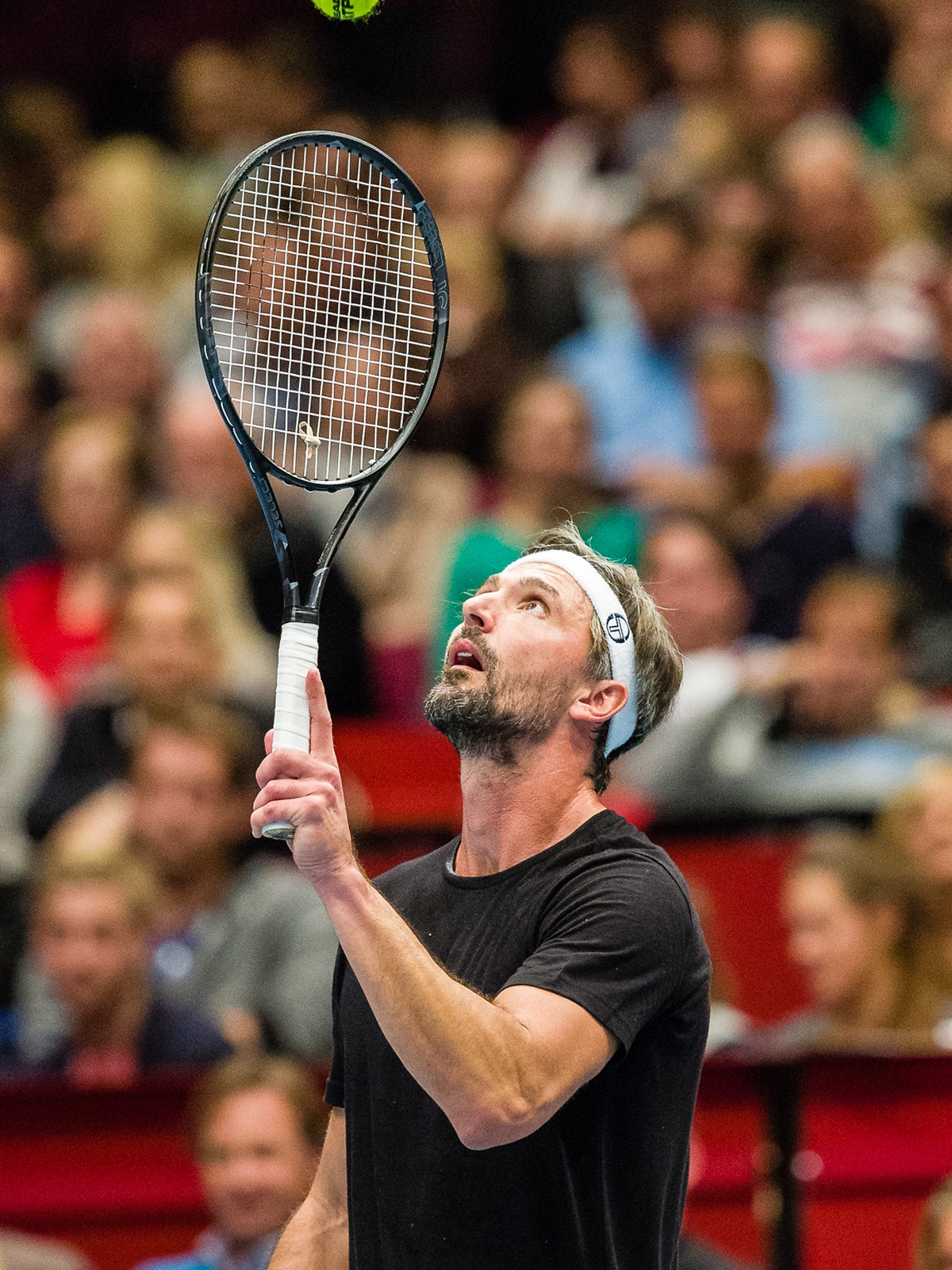
- Ivanišević in Vienna, 2016.
- Country (sports): Yugoslavia (1988–1992); Croatia (1992–2004)
- Residence: Monte Carlo, Monaco
- Born: 13 September 1971 (age 55) Split, SR Croatia, Yugoslavia
- Height: 1.93 m (6 ft 4 in)
- Turned pro: 1988
- Retired: 2004
- Plays: Left-handed (two-handed backhand)
- Prize money: US$19,878,007: 38th all-time leader in earnings
- Int. Tennis HoF: 2020 (member page)

Singles
- Career record: 599–333 (64.3%)
- Career titles: 22
- Highest ranking: No. 2 (4 July 1994)

Grand Slam singles results
- Australian Open: QF (1989, 1994, 1997)
- French Open: QF (1990, 1992, 1994)
- Wimbledon: W (2001)
- US Open: SF (1996)

Other tournaments
- Tour Finals: SF (1992, 1993, 1996)
- Grand Slam Cup: W (1995)
- Olympic Games: SF (1992)

Doubles
- Career record: 262–225 (53.8%)
- Career titles: 9
- Highest ranking: No. 20 (6 January 1992)

Grand Slam doubles results
- Australian Open: 2R (1990, 1994)
- French Open: F (1990, 1999)
- Wimbledon: 3R (1989, 1993)
- US Open: QF (1997)

Team competitions
- Davis Cup: W (2005)
- Hopman Cup: W (1996)

Coaching career
- Marin Čilić (2013–2016); Tomáš Berdych (2016–2017); Milos Raonic (2018–2019); Novak Djokovic (2019–2024); Elena Rybakina (2025); Stefanos Tsitsipas (2025); Arthur Fils (Feb 2026 - )

Coaching achievements
- Coachee singles titles total: 30
- List of notable tournaments (with champion): 3× Australian Open (Djokovic); 3× Wimbledon (Djokovic); 2× French Open (Djokovic); 2× US Open (Čilić, Djokovic); 2× ATP Finals (Djokovic); 7× ATP Tour Masters 1000 (Djokovic)
Medal record
Representing Croatia
Olympic Games
Bronze medal – third place	1992 Barcelona	Singles
Bronze medal – third place	1992 Barcelona	Men's Doubles
- Last updated on: 9 December 2023.

Goran Ivanišević (Croatian pronunciation: ['ɡǒran ˌiʋa'nǐːʃeʋitɕ]; born 13 September 1971) is a Croatian former professional tennis player and current coach. He was ranked world No. 2 in men's singles by the Association of Tennis Professionals (ATP) in July 1994. Ivanišević won 22 ATP Tour-level singles titles, including the 2001 Wimbledon Championships. He is the only singles player to win Wimbledon as a wild card, achieving the feat while ranked world No. 125. He had previously been runner-up at Wimbledon in 1992, 1994, and 1998. Ivanišević was known for his powerful left-handed serve, and for almost two decades held the record for most aces at Wimbledon with 1,377 (before Roger Federer broke it in 2019). He was inducted into the International Tennis Hall of Fame in 2020.

Following his playing career, Ivanišević coached Marin Čilić from September 2013 to July 2016, leading Čilić to a major title at the 2014 US Open. He then coached Novak Djokovic from 2019 to 2024, leading Djokovic to nine major titles. He shortly coached Elena Rybakina in early 2025. He currently coaches Arthur Fils.

== Career ==
Goran is the son of Gorana (née Škaričić) and Srđan Ivanišević. As a boy, he was trained by Jelena Genčić. He turned professional in 1988 and, later that year, with Rüdiger Haas, won his first career doubles title in Frankfurt. Although he focused mostly on his singles career, he also had some success in doubles, winning nine titles and reaching a career-high ranking of 20.

In 1989, as a qualifier he made the quarterfinals of the Australian Open. Ivanišević made his first significant impact on the tour in 1990, knocking Boris Becker out of the first round of the French Open men's singles; he went on to reach the quarterfinals. He was also, with Petr Korda, the runner-up in the French Open men's doubles. At that year's Wimbledon, Ivanišević reached the semifinals, where he lost to Becker in four sets. Ivanišević also won his first tour singles title in 1990 at Stuttgart and helped Yugoslavia win the World Team Cup. He played in eight ties for Yugoslavia in the Davis Cup before quitting the team after the Croatian declaration of independence in 1991. Yugoslavia lost its subsequent tie against France 5–0.

Ivanišević quickly became known on the tour for his strong, attacking style of play and for an extremely powerful serve. For several years, he had more aces than anyone else on the tour. He was also known for occasional on-court temper tantrums—usually directed towards himself—and the volatility of the standard of his play. Ivanišević received death threats at the 1992 Australian Men's Hardcourt Championships. He went on to win the tournament.

In 1992, Ivanišević surged his way into his first Wimbledon singles final, having defeated Ivan Lendl, Stefan Edberg, and Pete Sampras in succession. Ivanišević's four set semifinal victory over Sampras was particularly impressive, with Ivanišević serving 36 aces and not even facing a break point in the entire match. In the final, Ivanišević faced Andre Agassi and was heavily favored to win; with both players attempting to win their first Grand Slam title. Agassi eventually won in five sets. In the fifth set, Ivanišević had a break point on Agassi's serve at 3–3, but failed to convert it. In the final game of the match, Ivanišević served 2 double faults to start the game, even though he had only served 5 double faults in the entire match before that. Ivanišević's ace count for the tournament (206) was the highest in Wimbledon history at the time, until Ivanišević beat his own record in 2001 with 213 aces. Ivanišević served 37 aces in the 1992 Wimbledon final against Agassi, while Agassi had 37 aces in the entire tournament. Later that summer at the Olympic Games in Barcelona, Ivanišević won bronze medals in both singles and doubles representing Croatia, a state that had only recently declared independence; he also served as flagbearer for the Croatian team at the opening ceremony. In order to earn his single bronze medal, he won four consecutive 5-sets matches. He also won four singles titles that year.

Ivanišević reached the Wimbledon final for the second time in 1994, where he was defeated by defending-champion Pete Sampras in straight sets. Ivanišević reached his career-high singles ranking of world No. 2 in July that year.

In 1995, Ivanišević won the Grand Slam Cup, beating Todd Martin in the final in straight sets. At Wimbledon, Ivanišević again lost in the semifinals to Sampras in five sets.

In 1996, Ivanišević won a career-best five singles titles in a calendar year. He reached the Grand Slam Cup final again, but this time lost to Becker in straight sets. Ivanišević also teamed with Iva Majoli to win the 1996 Hopman Cup for Croatia. That year Ivanišević also defeated Stefan Edberg to reach the semifinals of the U.S. Open, his first Grand Slam semifinal away from Wimbledon; the match was the last Grand Slam match of Edberg's career. In the semifinals, Ivanišević fell again to Sampras, in four sets; Sampras would go on to defeat Michael Chang to win his fourth U.S. Open championship.

In April 1997, Ivanišević became the only player to defeat the "king of clay", Thomas Muster, in a Davis Cup singles match on clay. Ivanišević defeated Muster in five sets, despite Muster having won 112 of his previous 117 matches on clay going into the match. During 1997, Ivanišević also got back up to his career high ranking of world No. 2, although his ranking fell down to No. 15 by the end of the year.

In 1998, Ivanišević reached his third Wimbledon final, facing Sampras once again. Ivanišević started the match well, but failed to take set points which would have given him a two-set lead, and Ivanišević eventually lost to Sampras in five sets.

Ivanišević finished runner-up in the French Open men's doubles in 1999 (with Jeff Tarango). However, for much of 1999, 2000, and 2001, he struggled with a shoulder injury and his performance and world ranking began to slide steadily.

During his second round match at the 2000 Brighton International, Ivanišević was defaulted after he smashed all three of his rackets and had none available to complete the match. He told the Associated Press, "At least when I've finished playing tennis, they'll remember me for something...They'll say, 'There's that guy who never won Wimbledon, but he smashed all his rackets.'"

By the summer of 2001, Ivanišević was ranked the world No. 125. This was not sufficient to earn him an automatic place in the main draw at Wimbledon but, given his past record as a three-time runner-up, he was awarded a wild card for entry into the singles draw. He defeated former and future world No. 1 players Carlos Moyá, Andy Roddick and Marat Safin as well as Fredrik Jonsson and Greg Rusedski to reach the semifinal, beating home favourite Tim Henman in a five-set, rain-affected semifinal played over three days, considered a classic. With the win, he set up a match with the previous year's runner-up and former US Open champion Patrick Rafter. It was Ivanišević's first singles final since 1998. In a match lasting over three hours, Ivanišević defeated Rafter in five sets. Two months shy of his 30th birthday, Ivanišević became the lowest-ranked player and the first and only wild card entry to win Wimbledon. To date, he is the only male entrant to have won a Grand Slam singles title as a wild card. His Wimbledon success was rated sixteenth at the list of 100 Greatest Sporting Moments by a British television programme. Ivanišević dedicated his victory to Croatian basketball player Dražen Petrović.

On 10 July 2001, Ivanišević received a hero's welcome in his home city of Split where a crowd of over 150,000 led by local and state dignitaries greeted him at the central harbor, with a parade of boats and fireworks, topped off by Ivanišević himself taking off his clothes and jumping into the sea. Later that year he received the BBC Overseas Sports Personality of the Year Award.

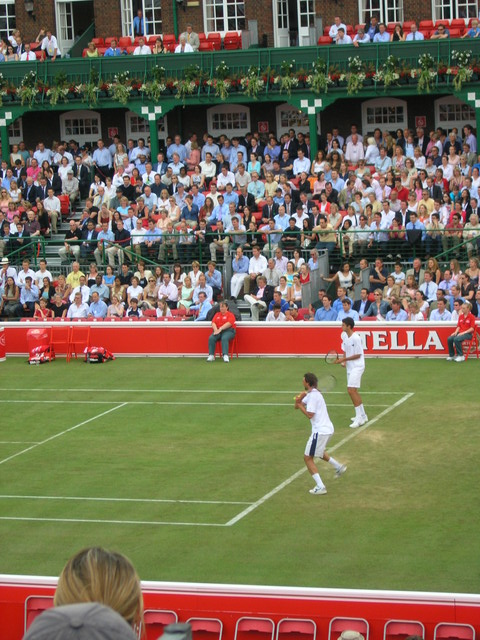
Goran Ivanišević and Mario Ančić playing doubles during the 2004 Queen's Club Championships.

The 2001 Wimbledon title was the last tournament win of Ivanišević's career. He temporarily retired in 2002 due to shoulder surgery. He returned to tennis sparingly in the following years but, in 2004, retired after a third-round loss to Lleyton Hewitt at Wimbledon, held on the Centre Court, the scene of his greatest triumph.

In 2005, he was part of the Croatian Davis Cup team that won the Davis Cup, although he did not play.

In 2011, Ivanišević came out of retirement to play in doubles with fellow countryman Marin Čilić, at the PBZ Zagreb Indoors, through wildcard entry. They lost in the first round to eventual semi-finalists Filip Polášek & Igor Zelenay.

== Football ==
Ivanišević played football for the Croatian team Hajduk Split in 2001. A supporter of English team West Bromwich Albion, he became a fan after the Midland club's escape from Premiership relegation in 2005. He wore an Albion shirt whilst warming up prior to the 2006 BlackRock Masters final and finally watched his first match in December 2011, as West Bromwich Albion played Queens Park Rangers at Loftus Road.

Ivanišević also participated in an exhibition match of the Croatian national team of 1998 versus the International football stars on 7 October 2002 in Zagreb. It was the last career match of Croatian midfielder and team captain Zvonimir Boban. Ivanišević scored the goal for 1–1 (the game ended 2–1 for the International stars).

== Playing style ==
Ivanisevic was a serve and volleyer and played a fast, aggressive game suited to grass courts. He was known for his powerful and accurate left-handed serve, particularly his first serve that was clutch, and is widely considered one of the most dominant servers in the history of tennis. He often won entire games without the ball being returned.

Like many serve-and-volleyers, Ivanisevic's return game and defence was weaker due to his powerful but inconsistent groundstrokes. On the backhand side, he would often use the slice instead of hitting with top-spin and use the chip-and-charge tactic to come to the net.

== Grand Slam tournament finals ==
=== Singles: 4 (1 title, 3 runner-ups) ===
Result	Year	Championship	Surface	Opponent	Score
Loss	1992	Wimbledon	Grass	(United States) Andre Agassi	7–6^{(10–8)}, 4–6, 4–6, 6–1, 4–6
Loss	1994	Wimbledon	Grass	(United States) Pete Sampras	6–7^{(2–7)}, 6–7^{(5–7)}, 0–6
Loss	1998	Wimbledon	Grass	(United States) Pete Sampras	7–6^{(7–2)}, 6–7^{(9–11)}, 4–6, 6–3, 2–6
Win	2001	Wimbledon	Grass	(Australia) Patrick Rafter	6–3, 3–6, 6–3, 2–6, 9–7

=== Doubles: 2 (2 runner-ups) ===
Result	Year	Championship	Surface	Partner	Opponents	Score
Loss	1990	French Open	Clay	(Czechoslovakia) Petr Korda	(Spain) Sergio Casal (Spain) Emilio Sánchez	5–7, 3–6
Loss	1999	French Open	Clay	(United States) Jeff Tarango	(India) Mahesh Bhupathi (India) Leander Paes	2–6, 5–7

== Other significant finals ==
=== Grand Slam Cup ===
==== Singles: 2 (1 title, 1 runner-up) ====
Result	Year	Tournament	Surface	Opponent	Score
Win	1995	Grand Slam Cup	Carpet (i)	(United States) Todd Martin	7–6^{(7–4)}, 6–3, 6–4
Loss	1996	Grand Slam Cup	Carpet (i)	(Germany) Boris Becker	3–6, 4–6, 4–6

=== ATP Super 9 finals ===
==== Singles: 7 (2 titles, 5 runner-ups) ====
Result	Year	Tournament	Surface	Opponent	Score
Win	1992	Stockholm	Carpet (i)	(France) Guy Forget	7–6^{(7–2)}, 4–6, 7–6^{(7–5)}, 6–2
Loss	1993	Rome	Clay	(United States) Jim Courier	1–6, 2–6, 2–6
Loss	1993	Stockholm	Carpet (i)	(Germany) Michael Stich	6–4, 6–7^{(6–8)}, 6–7^{(3–7)}, 2–6
Win	1993	Paris	Carpet (i)	(Ukraine) Andrei Medvedev	6–4, 6–2, 7–6^{(7–2)}
Loss	1994	Stockholm	Carpet (i)	(Germany) Boris Becker	6–4, 4–6, 3–6, 6–7^{(4–7)}
Loss	1995	Hamburg	Clay	(Ukraine) Andrei Medvedev	3–6, 2–6, 1–6
Loss	1996	Miami	Hard	(United States) Andre Agassi	0–3 ret.

=== Doubles: 1 (1 title) ===
Result	Year	Tournament	Surface	Partner	Opponent	Score
Win	1991	Rome	Clay	(Italy) Omar Camporese	(Australia) Laurie Warder (United States) Luke Jensen	6–2, 6–3

== ATP career finals ==
=== Singles: 49 (22 titles / 27 runner-ups) ===
Legend Grand Slam (1–3) Grand Slam Cup (1–1) ATP Super 9 (2–5) ATP Championship Series (7–5) ATP World Series (11–13)	Titles by surface Hard (3–8) Grass (2–4) Clay (3–6) Carpet (14–9)

Result	W-L	Date	Tournament	Surface	Opponent	Score
Loss	0–1	May 1989	Florence, Italy	Clay	(Argentina) Horacio de la Peña	4–6, 3–6
Loss	0–2	May 1990	Umag, Yugoslavia	Clay	(Socialist Federal Republic of Yugoslavia) Goran Prpić	3–6, 6–4, 4–6
Win	1–2	Jul 1990	Stuttgart Outdoor, Germany	Clay	(Argentina) Guillermo Pérez Roldán	6–7^{(2–7)}, 6–1, 6–4, 7–6^{(7–5)}
Loss	1–3	Aug 1990	Long Island, US	Hard	(Sweden) Stefan Edberg	6–7^{(3–7)}, 3–6
Loss	1–4	Sep 1990	Bordeaux, France	Clay	(France) Guy Forget	4–6, 3–6
Loss	1–5	Sep 1990	Basel, Switzerland	Carpet (i)	(United States) John McEnroe	7–6^{(7–4)}, 6–4, 6–7^{(3–7)}, 3–6, 4–6
Win	2–5	Jun 1991	Manchester, UK	Grass	(United States) Pete Sampras	6–4, 6–4
Loss	2–6	Aug 1991	New Haven, US	Hard	(Czechoslovakia) Petr Korda	4–6, 2–6
Win	3–6	Dec 1991	Adelaide, Australia	Hard	(Sweden) Christian Bergström	1–6, 7–6^{(7–5)}, 6–4
Loss	3–7	Feb 1992	Milan, Italy	Carpet (i)	(Italy) Omar Camporese	6–3, 3–6, 4–6
Win	4–7	Feb 1992	Stuttgart Indoor, Germany	Carpet (i)	(Sweden) Stefan Edberg	6–7^{(5–7)}, 6–3, 6–4, 6–4
Loss	4–8	Jul 1992	Wimbledon, London	Grass	(United States) Andre Agassi	7–6^{(10–8)}, 4–6, 4–6, 6–1, 4–6
Win	5–8	Oct 1992	Sydney Indoor, Australia	Hard (i)	(Sweden) Stefan Edberg	6–4, 6–2, 6–4
Win	6–8	Oct 1992	Stockholm, Sweden	Carpet (i)	(France) Guy Forget	7–6^{(7–2)}, 4–6, 7–6^{(7–5)}, 6–2
Loss	6–9	Jan 1993	Doha, Qatar	Hard	(Germany) Boris Becker	6–7^{(4–7)}, 6–4, 5–7
Loss	6–10	May 1993	Rome, Italy	Clay	(United States) Jim Courier	1–6, 2–6, 2–6
Win	7–10	Sep 1993	Bucharest, Romania	Clay	(Russia) Andrei Cherkasov	6–2, 7–6^{(7–5)}
Win	8–10	Oct 1993	Vienna, Austria	Carpet (i)	(Austria) Thomas Muster	4–6, 6–4, 6–4, 7–6^{(7–3)}
Loss	8–11	Oct 1993	Stockholm, Sweden	Carpet (i)	(Germany) Michael Stich	6–4, 6–7^{(6–8)}, 6–7^{(3–7)}, 2–6
Win	9–11	Nov 1993	Paris Indoor, France	Carpet (i)	(Ukraine) Andrei Medvedev	6–4, 6–2, 7–6^{(7–2)}
Loss	9–12	Feb 1994	Stuttgart Indoor, Germany	Carpet (i)	(Sweden) Stefan Edberg	6–4, 4–6, 2–6, 2–6
Loss	9–13	Jun 1994	Wimbledon, London	Grass	(United States) Pete Sampras	6–7^{(2–7)}, 6–7^{(5–7)}, 0–6
Win	10–13	Aug 1994	Kitzbühel, Austria	Clay	(France) Fabrice Santoro	6–2, 4–6, 4–6, 6–3, 6–2
Loss	10–14	Sep 1994	Bucharest, Romania	Clay	(Argentina) Franco Davín	2–6, 4–6
Win	11–14	Oct 1994	Tokyo Indoor, Japan	Carpet (i)	(United States) Michael Chang	6–4, 6–4
Loss	11–15	Oct 1994	Stockholm, Sweden	Carpet (i)	(Germany) Boris Becker	6–4, 4–6, 3–6, 6–7^{(4–7)}
Loss	11–16	May 1995	Hamburg, Germany	Clay	(Ukraine) Andrei Medvedev	3–6, 2–6, 1–6
Win	12–16	Dec 1995	Grand Slam Cup, Munich	Carpet (i)	(United States) Todd Martin	7–6^{(7–4)}, 6–3, 6–4
Loss	12–17	Jan 1996	Sydney Outdoor, Australia	Hard	(United States) Todd Martin	7–5, 3–6, 4–6
Win	13–17	Jan 1996	Zagreb, Croatia	Carpet (i)	(France) Cédric Pioline	3–6, 6–3, 6–2
Win	14–17	Feb 1996	Dubai, UAE	Hard	(Spain) Albert Costa	6–4, 6–3
Loss	14–18	Feb 1996	Antwerp, Belgium	Carpet (i)	(Germany) Michael Stich	3–6, 2–6, 6–7^{(5–7)}
Win	15–18	Feb 1996	Milan, Italy	Carpet (i)	(Switzerland) Marc Rosset	6–3, 7–6^{(7–3)}
Win	16–18	Mar 1996	Rotterdam, Netherlands	Carpet (i)	(Russia) Yevgeny Kafelnikov	6–4, 3–6, 6–3
Loss	16–19	Mar 1996	Key Biscayne, US	Hard	(United States) Andre Agassi	0–3, ret.
Loss	16–20	Aug 1996	Indianapolis, US	Hard	(United States) Pete Sampras	6–7^{(3–7)}, 5–7
Win	17–20	Nov 1996	Moscow, Russia	Carpet (i)	(Russia) Yevgeny Kafelnikov	3–6, 6–1, 6–3
Loss	17–21	Dec 1996	Grand Slam Cup, Munich	Carpet (i)	(Germany) Boris Becker	3–6, 4–6, 4–6
Win	18–21	Jan 1997	Zagreb, Croatia	Carpet (i)	(United Kingdom) Greg Rusedski	7–6^{(7–4)}, 4–6, 7–6^{(8–6)}
Loss	18–22	Feb 1997	Dubai, UAE	Hard	(Austria) Thomas Muster	5–7, 6–7^{(3–7)}
Win	19–22	Feb 1997	Milan, Italy	Carpet (i)	(Spain) Sergi Bruguera	6–2, 6–2
Loss	19–23	Jun 1997	Queen's Club, UK	Grass	(Australia) Mark Philippoussis	5–7, 3–6
Win	20–23	Oct 1997	Vienna, Austria	Carpet (i)	(United Kingdom) Greg Rusedski	3–6, 6–7^{(4–7)}, 7–6^{(7–4)}, 6–2, 6–3
Win	21–23	Feb 1998	Split, Croatia	Carpet (i)	(United Kingdom) Greg Rusedski	7–6^{(7–3)}, 7–6^{(7–5)}
Loss	21–24	Jun 1998	Wimbledon, London	Grass	(United States) Pete Sampras	7–6^{(7–2)}, 6–7^{(9–11)}, 4–6, 6–3, 2–6
Loss	21–25	Aug 1998	New Haven, US	Hard	(Slovakia) Karol Kučera	4–6, 7–5, 2–6
Loss	21–26	Oct 1998	Shanghai, China	Carpet	(United States) Michael Chang	6–4, 1–6, 2–6
Loss	21–27	Nov 1998	Moscow, Russia	Carpet	(Russia) Yevgeny Kafelnikov	6–7^{(2–7)}, 6–7^{(5–7)}
Win	22–27	Jul 2001	Wimbledon, London	Grass	(Australia) Patrick Rafter	6–3, 3–6, 6–3, 2–6, 9–7

=== Doubles: 19 (9 titles / 10 runner-ups) ===
Legend Grand Slam Tournaments (0–2) Tennis Masters Cup (0–0) ATP Masters Series (1–0) ATP International Series Gold (1–4) ATP International Series (7–4)	Finals by surface Hard (3–3) Clay (1–5) Grass (1–1) Carpet (4–1)

Result	W-L	Date	Tournament	Surface	Partner	Opponents	Score
Win	1–0	Oct 1988	Frankfurt, Germany	Carpet (i)	(West Germany) Rüdiger Haas	(United Kingdom) Jeremy Bates (Netherlands) Tom Nijssen	1–6, 7–5, 6–3
Loss	1–1	Oct 1989	Palermo, Italy	Clay	(Italy) Diego Nargiso	(West Germany) Peter Ballauff (West Germany) Rüdiger Haas	2–6, 7–6, 4–6
Loss	1–2	Feb 1990	Brussels, Belgium	Carpet (i)	(Hungary) Balázs Taróczy	(Spain) Emilio Sánchez (Socialist Federal Republic of Yugoslavia) Slobodan Živojinović	5–7, 3–6
Loss	1–3	Jun 1990	French Open, Paris	Clay	(Czechoslovakia) Petr Korda	(Spain) Sergio Casal (Spain) Emilio Sánchez	5–7, 3–6
Loss	1–4	Aug 1990	New Haven, U.S.	Hard	(Czech Republic) Petr Korda	(United States) Jeff Brown (United States) Scott Melville	5–7, 6–7
Win	2–4	Feb 1991	Milan, Italy	Carpet (i)	(Italy) Omar Camporese	(Czechoslovakia) Cyril Suk (Netherlands) Tom Nijssen	6–4, 7–6
Win	3–4	May 1991	Rome, Italy	Clay	(Italy) Omar Camporese	(Australia) Laurie Warder (United States) Luke Jensen	6–2, 6–3
Win	4–4	Jun 1991	Manchester, UK	Grass	(Italy) Omar Camporese	(United Kingdom) Andrew Castle (United Kingdom) Nick Brown	6–4, 6–3
Loss	4–5	Jul 1991	Stuttgart Outdoor, Germany	Clay	(Italy) Omar Camporese	(Australia) Wally Masur (Spain) Emilio Sánchez	6–2, 3–6, 4–6
Win	5–5	Dec 1991	Adelaide, Australia	Hard	(Switzerland) Marc Rosset	(Australia) Mark Kratzmann (Australia) Jason Stoltenberg	7–6, 7–6
Loss	5–6	Jun 1992	Queen's Club, UK	Grass	(Italy) Diego Nargiso	(Australia) John Fitzgerald (Sweden) Anders Järryd	4–6, 6–7
Loss	5–7	Apr 1995	Barcelona, Spain	Clay	(Italy) Andrea Gaudenzi	(United States) Trevor Kronemann (Australia) David Macpherson	2–6, 4–6
Loss	5–8	Aug 1995	Los Angeles, U.S.	Hard	(Croatia) Saša Hiršzon	(South Africa) Brent Haygarth (United States) Kent Kinnear	4–6, 5–7
Win	6–8	Sep 1995	Bordeaux, France	Hard	(Croatia) Saša Hiršzon	(Sweden) Henrik Holm (United Kingdom) Danny Sapsford	6–3, 6–4
Win	7–8	Feb 1996	Milan, Italy	Carpet (i)	(Italy) Andrea Gaudenzi	(Switzerland) Jakob Hlasek (France) Guy Forget	6–4, 7–5
Win	8–8	Jan 1997	Zagreb, Croatia	Carpet (i)	(Croatia) Saša Hiršzon	(South Africa) Brent Haygarth (United States) Mark Keil	6–4, 6–3
Win	9–8	Feb 1997	Dubai, UAE	Hard	(Netherlands) Sander Groen	(Australia) Sandon Stolle (Czech Republic) Cyril Suk	7–6, 6–3
Loss	9–9	Jun 1999	French Open, Paris	Clay	(United States) Jeff Tarango	(India) Mahesh Bhupathi (India) Leander Paes	2–6, 5–7
Loss	9–10	Aug 1999	Los Angeles	Hard	(United States) Brian MacPhie	(Zimbabwe) Byron Black (Zimbabwe) Wayne Black	2–6, 6–7

== Team titles ==
- 1990 – World Team Cup winner with Yugoslavia
- 1996 – Hopman Cup winner with Croatia
- 2005 – Davis Cup winner with Croatia

== Performance timelines ==
Key
W	F	SF	QF	#R	RR	Q#	P#	DNQ	A	Z#	PO	G	S	B	NMS	NTI	P	NH

(W) winner; (F) finalist; (SF) semifinalist; (QF) quarterfinalist; (#R) rounds 4, 3, 2, 1; (RR) round-robin stage; (Q#) qualification round; (DNQ) did not qualify; (A) absent; (NH) not held; (SR) strike rate (events won / competed); (W–L) win–loss record.

=== Singles ===
	(Socialist Federal Republic of Yugoslavia) YUG				(Croatia) CRO																
Tournament	1988	1989	1990	1991	1992	1993	1994	1995	1996	1997	1998	1999	2000	2001	2002	2003	2004	2005	SR	W–L	Win %
Grand Slam tournaments
Australian Open	A	QF	1R	3R	2R	A	QF	1R	3R	QF	1R	A	2R	Q1	2R	A	A	A	0 / 11	19–11	63%
French Open	A	4R	QF	2R	QF	3R	QF	1R	4R	1R	1R	1R	1R	A	A	A	A	A	0 / 12	21–12	64%
Wimbledon	1R	2R	SF	2R	F	3R	F	SF	QF	2R	F	4R	1R	W	A	A	3R	A	1 / 15	49–14	78%
US Open	A	2R	3R	4R	3R	2R	1R	1R	SF	1R	4R	3R	1R	3R	A	A	A	A	0 / 13	21–13	62%
Win–loss	0–1	9–4	11–4	7–4	13–4	5–3	14–4	5–4	14–4	5–4	9–4	5–3	1–4	9–1	1–1	0–0	2–1	0–0	1 / 51	110–50	69%
Year-end championship
Tennis Masters Cup	did not qualify				SF	SF	RR	DNQ	SF	did not qualify				RR	did not qualify				0 / 5	8–10	44%
Grand Slam Cup	not held		QF	A	SF	A	SF	W	F	A	QF	A	not held						1 / 6	11–5	69%
National representation
Olympic Games	1R	not held			SF-B	not held			1R	not held			1R	not held			A	NH	0 / 4	4–4	50%
Davis Cup	SF	SF	1R	QF	A	PO	PO	1R	PO	Z1	A	A	Z2	PO	QF	QF	A	W	1 / 8	28–9	76%
Grand Prix			ATP Masters Series																		
Indian Wells	A	1R	3R	1R	1R	1R	1R	A	SF	1R	1R	2R	2R	3R	A	1R	A	A	0 / 13	9–13	41%
Miami	A	1R	2R	A	2R	1R	QF	A	F	QF	3R	2R	3R	2R	2R	A	2R	A	0 / 13	19–13	59%
Monte Carlo	A	1R	2R	2R	A	1R	QF	SF	1R	A	1R	1R	1R	A	A	A	1R	A	0 / 11	8–11	42%
Rome	A	2R	A	1R	1R	F	SF	SF	3R	SF	1R	1R	1R	Q1	A	A	1R	A	0 / 12	20–12	63%
Hamburg	A	3R	1R	QF	2R	A	1R	F	1R	A	QF	1R	Q2	A	A	A	A	A	0 / 9	12–9	57%
Canada	A	1R	A	A	A	A	A	2R	1R	2R	3R	1R	A	A	A	A	A	A	0 / 6	4–6	40%
Cincinnati	A	A	A	A	A	1R	A	QF	QF	2R	3R	1R	A	3R	A	A	A	A	0 / 7	9–7	56%
Stockholm^{1}	A	A	QF	QF	W	F	F	2R	QF	2R	QF	1R	1R	3R	A	A	A	A	1 / 12	22–11	67%
Paris	A	A	2R	2R	SF	W	QF	1R	1R	A	1R	Q1	Q1	2R	A	A	A	A	1 / 9	12–8	60%
Career statistics
	1988	1989	1990	1991	1992	1993	1994	1995	1996	1997	1998	1999	2000	2001	2002	2003	2004	2005	Career		
Titles	0	0	1	1	4	3	2	1	5	3	1	0	0	1	0	0	0	0	22		
Finals	0	1	5	3	5	5	6	2	10	5	5	0	0	1	0	0	0	0	49		
Year-end ranking	371	40	9	16	4	7	5	10	4	15	12	62	129	12	243	657	266	–			

^{1} Held as Stockholm Masters until 1994, Stuttgart Masters from 1995 to 2001.

=== Doubles ===
	(Socialist Federal Republic of Yugoslavia) YUG				(Croatia) CRO													
Tournament	1988	1989	1990	1991	1992	1993	1994	1995	1996	1997	1998	1999	2000	2001	2002	2003	2004	SR
Grand Slam tournaments
Australian Open	A	1R	2R	1R	1R	A	2R	A	A	1R	1R	A	1R	A	A	A	A	0 / 8
French Open	A	3R	F	2R	1R	QF	A	A	A	1R	1R	F	2R	A	A	A	A	0 / 9
Wimbledon	A	3R	1R	2R	1R	3R	A	A	A	A	A	A	A	A	A	A	A	0 / 5
US Open	A	3R	2R	2R	2R	2R	A	A	2R	QF	1R	1R	A	A	A	A	A	0 / 9
Grand Prix			ATP Masters Series															
Indian Wells	A	QF	1R	1R	1R	A	2R	A	2R	A	2R	A	2R	A	1R	A	A	0 / 9
Miami	A	2R	2R	A	A	3R	3R	A	A	2R	3R	1R	3R	Q2	A	A	A	0 / 8
Monte Carlo	A	QF	1R	1R	A	1R	1R	QF	2R	A	A	A	1R	A	A	A	A	0 / 8
Rome	A	2R	A	W	SF	QF	1R	QF	2R	1R	SF	1R	1R	A	A	A	1R	1 / 12
Hamburg	A	1R	2R	2R	1R	A	2R	Q2	2R	A	1R	A	1R	A	A	A	A	0 / 8
Canada	A	2R	A	A	A	A	A	1R	1R	1R	2R	QF	A	A	A	A	A	0 / 6
Cincinnati	A	A	A	A	A	1R	A	1R	1R	1R	A	1R	A	1R	A	A	A	0 / 6
Stockholm^{1}	1R	A	QF	2R	2R	A	A	1R	SF	A	SF	1R	QF	1R	A	A	A	0 / 10
Paris	A	A	1R	2R	2R	A	A	1R	A	A	A	A	A	A	A	A	A	0 / 4
Career statistics
Year-end ranking	139	49	31	24	42	111	122	58	59	69	68	51	125	493	1137	–	542	

^{1} Held as Stockholm Masters until 1994, Stuttgart Masters from 1995 to 2001.

== Top 10 wins ==
Season	1988	1989	1990	1991	1992	1993	1994	1995	1996	1997	1998	1999	2000	2001	2002	2003	2004	Total
Wins	0	3	3	5	11	8	5	5	9	3	2	2	0	4	0	0	0	60

#	Player	Rank	Event	Surface	Rd	Score	IR
1989
1.	(Sweden) Kent Carlsson	9	Hamburg, Germany	Clay	2R	7–5, 4–6, 6–1	71
2.	(Argentina) Alberto Mancini	10	Palermo, Italy	Clay	QF	3–6, 7–5, 6–4	56
3.	(Switzerland) Jakob Hlasek	9	Basel, Switzerland	Hard (i)	2R	4–6, 6–3, 7–5	46
1990
4.	(Germany) Boris Becker	3	French Open, Paris, France	Clay	1R	5–7, 6–4, 7–5, 6–2	51
5.	(Spain) Emilio Sánchez	9	Stuttgart, Germany	Clay	SF	6–4, 6–4	24
6.	(United States) John McEnroe	9	Stockholm, Sweden	Carpet (i)	3R	6–4, 6–4	11
1991
7.	(Sweden) Stefan Edberg	2	Davis Cup, Zagreb, Yugoslavia	Clay (i)	RR	6–4, 6–2	7
8.	(United States) Pete Sampras	9	Manchester, United Kingdom	Grass	F	6–4, 6–4	11
9.	(United States) Andre Agassi	8	Sydney, Australia	Hard (i)	QF	7–5, 7–6^{(7–3)}	19
10.	(United States) Andre Agassi	8	Tokyo, Japan	Carpet (i)	QF	6–3, 6–4	16
11.	(France) Guy Forget	6	Stockholm, Sweden	Carpet (i)	3R	7–6^{(15–13)}, 7–6^{(7–5)}	15
1992
12.	(United States) Jim Courier	1	Stuttgart, Germany	Carpet (i)	QF	3–6, 7–6^{(7–2)}, 7–6^{(10–8)}	9
13.	(Sweden) Stefan Edberg	2	Stuttgart, Germany	Carpet (i)	F	6–7^{(5–7)}, 6–3, 6–4, 6–4	9
14.	(Spain) Carlos Costa	10	French Open, Paris, France	Clay	4R	6–3, 4–6, 6–1, 6–1	9
15.	(Sweden) Stefan Edberg	2	Wimbledon, London, United Kingdom	Grass	QF	6–7^{(10–12)}, 7–5, 6–1, 3–6, 6–3	8
16.	(United States) Pete Sampras	3	Wimbledon, London, United Kingdom	Grass	SF	6–7^{(4–7)}, 7–6^{(7–5)}, 6–4, 6–2	8
17.	(Sweden) Stefan Edberg	3	Sydney, Australia	Hard (i)	F	6–4, 6–2, 6–4	8
18.	(Germany) Boris Becker	10	Stockholm, Sweden	Carpet (i)	QF	7–5, 6–4	7
19.	(Sweden) Stefan Edberg	3	Stockholm, Sweden	Carpet (i)	SF	6–4, 7–6^{(10–8)}	7
20.	(United States) Michael Chang	5	ATP Tour World Championships, Frankfurt, Germany	Carpet (i)	RR	7–6^{(7–4)}, 6–2	4
21.	(United States) Jim Courier	1	ATP Tour World Championships, Frankfurt, Germany	Carpet (i)	RR	6–3, 6–3	4
22.	(Netherlands) Richard Krajicek	10	ATP Tour World Championships, Frankfurt, Germany	Carpet (i)	RR	6–4, 6–3	4
1993
23.	(United States) Pete Sampras	1	Rome, Italy	Clay	SF	7–6^{(7–4)}, 6–2	6
24.	(Austria) Thomas Muster	9	Vienna, Austria	Carpet (i)	F	4–6, 6–4, 6–4, 7–6^{(7–3)}	12
25.	(United States) Michael Chang	7	Paris, France	Carpet (i)	3R	7–6^{(7–5)}, 7–5	11
26.	(United States) Pete Sampras	1	Paris, France	Carpet (i)	QF	7–6^{(7–3)}, 7–5	11
27.	(Sweden) Stefan Edberg	6	Paris, France	Carpet (i)	SF	4–6, 7–6^{(7–4)}, 7–6^{(7–3)}	11
28.	(Ukraine) Andriy Medvedev	8	Paris, France	Carpet (i)	F	6–4, 6–2, 7–6^{(7–2)}	11
29.	(Spain) Sergi Bruguera	4	ATP Tour World Championships, Frankfurt, Germany	Carpet (i)	RR	6–4, 7–6^{(7–4)}	8
30.	(Sweden) Stefan Edberg	5	ATP Tour World Championships, Frankfurt, Germany	Carpet (i)	RR	7–6^{(7–3)}, 6–7^{(5–7)}, 6–3	8
1994
31.	(Germany) Boris Becker	10	Wimbledon, London, United Kingdom	Grass	SF	6–2, 7–6^{(8–6)}, 6–4	5
32.	(Sweden) Stefan Edberg	5	Tokyo, Japan	Carpet (i)	SF	6–4, 6–4	2
33.	(United States) Michael Chang	9	Tokyo, Japan	Carpet (i)	F	6–4, 6–4	2
34.	(United States) Andre Agassi	8	Stockholm, Sweden	Carpet (i)	QF	6–1, 3–6, 7–6^{(10–8)}	2
35.	(Germany) Boris Becker	3	Grand Slam Cup, Munich, Germany	Carpet (i)	QF	6–4, 6–1	5
1995
36.	(Spain) Alberto Berasategui	7	Barcelona, Spain	Clay	QF	1–6, 6–4, 6–4	9
37.	(Russia) Yevgeny Kafelnikov	9	World Team Cup, Düsseldorf, Germany	Clay	RR	6–4, 7–6^{(7–4)}	4
38.	(Sweden) Magnus Larsson	10	World Team Cup, Düsseldorf, Germany	Clay	F	6–4, 6–4	4
39.	(Russia) Yevgeny Kafelnikov	7	Wimbledon, London, United Kingdom	Grass	QF	7–5, 7–6^{(13–11)}, 6–3	6
40.	(Russia) Yevgeny Kafelnikov	6	Grand Slam Cup, Munich, Germany	Carpet (i)	SF	7–6^{(9–7)}, 4–6, 6–3, 6–4	10
1996
41.	(South Africa) Wayne Ferreira	10	Dubai, United Arab Emirates	Hard	QF	6–2, 6–1	9
42.	(Germany) Boris Becker	4	Antwerp, Belgium	Carpet (i)	SF	6–4, 7–6^{(7–5)}	9
43.	(Russia) Yevgeny Kafelnikov	8	Rotterdam, Netherlands	Carpet (i)	F	6–4, 3–6, 6–3	6
44.	(United States) Michael Chang	4	Miami, United States	Hard	QF	6–4, 6–4	6
45.	(United States) Pete Sampras	2	Miami, United States	Hard	SF	2–6, 6–4, 6–4	6
46.	(Russia) Yevgeny Kafelnikov	3	Moscow, Russia	Carpet (i)	F	3–6, 6–1, 6–3	4
47.	(Austria) Thomas Muster	5	ATP Tour World Championships, Hanover, Germany	Carpet (i)	RR	6–4, 6–4	4
48.	(Netherlands) Richard Krajicek	8	ATP Tour World Championships, Hanover, Germany	Carpet (i)	RR	6–4, 6–7^{(4–7)}, 7–6^{(7–1)}	4
49.	(Russia) Yevgeny Kafelnikov	3	Grand Slam Cup, Munich, Germany	Carpet (i)	SF	6–7^{(6–8)}, 2–6, 6–3, 6–2, 6–4	4
1997
50.	(Austria) Thomas Muster	2	Davis Cup, Graz, Austria	Clay (i)	RR	6–7^{(5–7)}, 7–5, 6–7^{(5–7)}, 6–2, 7–5	5
51.	(United States) Michael Chang	2	World Team Cup, Düsseldorf, Germany	Clay	RR	6–2, 2–6, 6–3	4
52.	(United Kingdom) Greg Rusedski	4	Vienna, Austria	Carpet (i)	F	3–6, 6–7^{(4–7)}, 7–6^{(7–4)}, 6–2, 6–3	9
1998
53.	(United Kingdom) Greg Rusedski	8	Split, Croatia	Carpet (i)	F	7–6^{(7–3)}, 7–6^{(7–5)}	16
54.	(United Kingdom) Greg Rusedski	5	Hamburg, Germany	Clay	3R	6–4, 6–2	23
1999
55.	(Russia) Yevgeny Kafelnikov	2	Basel, Switzerland	Carpet (i)	QF	4–6, 6–3, 6–4	44
56.	(Brazil) Gustavo Kuerten	5	Vienna, Austria	Hard (i)	1R	6–1, 6–7^{(2–7)}, 6–4	43
2001
57.	(Sweden) Thomas Enqvist	9	Indian Wells, United States	Hard	2R	7–6^{(7–1)}, 6–3	126
58.	(Russia) Marat Safin	3	Wimbledon, London, United Kingdom	Grass	QF	7–6^{(7–2)}, 7–5, 3–6, 7–6^{(7–3)}	125
59.	(Australia) Pat Rafter	10	Wimbledon, London, United Kingdom	Grass	F	6–3, 3–6, 6–3, 2–6, 9–7	125
60.	(Brazil) Gustavo Kuerten	1	Tennis Masters Cup, Sydney, Australia	Hard (i)	RR	6–2, 6–7^{(2–7)}, 6–4	13

== Records ==
- The only male player to win a Grand Slam title as a wild card. He achieved this at Wimbledon in 2001.
- Most aces by any player in a single season 1991 to present (1,477 in 1996).

== Post-playing ==
=== Senior tennis tour and other engagements ===
Right after retiring from the ATP Tour in 2004, Ivanišević started playing on the ATP Champions Tour (seniors' circuit).

In 2005, he was a member of the Croatian team for the Davis Cup final against Slovakia in Bratislava, although he did not play. Croatia won the final 3–2. Ivanišević received a winner's medal and his name was engraved on the trophy along with Mario Ančić, Ivo Karlović, Ivan Ljubičić and team captain Nikola Pilić.

In June 2006, he performed in the Calderstones Park tournament in Liverpool. In November of the same year, Ivanišević won the Merrill Lynch Tour of Champions tournament in Frankfurt, defeating John McEnroe 7–6^{(12)}, 7–6^{(1)}.

In 2007, Roger Federer, seeking his 5th consecutive Wimbledon title against Rafael Nadal in the final, practiced with Ivanišević. Federer said the practice session helped him against Nadal.

As of 2019, Ivanišević still takes part in tournaments on the seniors' circuit, and he is currently coaching Novak Djokovic.

On 17 July, Ivanišević faced Rafter once again in an exhibition match on 2019 Croatia Open Umag. The match was held to celebrate 18th "birthday" of the famous 2001 Wimbledon final in which Ivanišević won. Ivanišević won once again 6–4, 6–4. The Croatian Open Centre Court has also been renamed in Ivanišević's honour.

=== Investments ===
Retiring in 2004 also allowed thirty-three-year-old Ivanišević to devote more attention to investing in the real estate and construction industries, which he had already been involved with since 1998, conducting the activities through the simultaneously registered Sport Line limited liability company based in Split, Croatia. Due to Ivanišević still being an active tennis player at the time of the venture's launch, most of the company's initial day-to-day business was handled by his father Srdjan. Their main activity was an ambitious undertaking—construction of a 65-unit luxury apartment building in the Split neighbourhood of Firule. Named "Lazarica 2", the building's construction was supposed to start in November 1998 and finish by late 2000. After many delays, the project finally completed in 2003, but dragged the company into debt due to many unsold units.

News of Ivanišević's financial problems first appeared in the summer of 2005 after he talked about it in an interview with Globus newsmagazine, revealing Lazarica 2 to be a "failed project", as well as admitting to being "devoured by sharks" after hastily getting into investments that in hindsight he viewed as "jumping overnight from kindergarten to university". Later that year, he also talked to the Daily Telegraph about "losing substantial amount of money" in some of his investments.

By September 2006, after months of speculation, Ivanišević joined a group of investors—including active AC Milan footballer Dario Šimić, retired basketball player Ivica Žurić as well as businessmen Marijan Šarić, Mate Šarić, and Batheja Pramod—for a joint HRK93 million (~€12.5 million) investment into the added market capitalization of Karlovačka banka. Ivanišević, Šimić, and Žurić invested HRK19 million (~€2.5 million) each, thus each obtaining 9% ownership stake in the bank.

Ivanišević's finances became news again in August 2010 after reports of his Sunseeker Predator 72 motor yacht being repossessed by Hypo Leasing Kroatien, a subsidiary of Hypo Alpe Adria Bank due to reportedly a full year of Ivanišević failing to meet his €12,000 monthly lease payments. Ivanišević would deny this, saying that the yacht was returned due to mechanical defect.

On 31 January 2013, after accumulating debts of HRK5.7 million (~€752,000), Ivanišević's company Sport Line filed for bankruptcy settlement proceedings before the Croatian Trade Court. Among the list of entities the company reportedly owed money to is the Croatian government in the amount of HRK1.1 million (~€145,000). Additionally, even his real estate business, conducted through another limited liability company, Goran promocije, was in trouble, with its account blocked for over a year with debts of HRK1.14 million. According to Croatian media reports, as of his company's 2013 bankruptcy proceedings, most of Ivanišević's assets—such as his two Zagreb apartments, his ownership stake in Karlovačka banka, and his 40,000 m^{2} of land in Duilovo—were safe from being sold off or liquidated as he had already signed them over to either his wife Tatjana Dragović (the Zagreb apartments and bank stake) or his mother Gorana Ivanišević (the plot of land).

==== Meje villa and Duilovo land controversy ====
Soon after his memorable 2001 Wimbledon win and the next day's rapturous hero's homecoming with 150,000 people coming out to greet him in the Split harbour, Ivanišević purchased a derelict seaside property within the Marjan hill park/forest in the neighbourhood of Meje adjacent to the city centre. Simultaneously, he further bought an undeveloped 40,000 m^{2} plot of land in Duilovo on the city outskirts. Despite the city of Split urban development plan intending the attractively located area by the sea in Meje for public use, the tennis player successfully petitioned the city authorities into changing their plan thus opening the door for tearing down the existing dilapidated structure and instead building a private use 1,000 m^{2} modernist villa, which Ivanišević claimed would become his family home once he retires from playing tennis professionally. Furthermore, he managed to obtain approval for the land in Duilovo to be re-purposed from green to sporting usage. In his 2001 application submission to the Split city council, the Wimbledon champion tied the two construction projects together, asking to be allowed to build a private-use property in Meje while promising to "give back to the citizens of Split and Croatian sports" by building a youth tennis academy on the plot of land in Duilovo. Furthermore, Ivanišević's application contained the following emotional appeal: "It's been a long time wish of mine to, at long last, settle down in the city of my birth, the home of my ancestors for centuries. I want to give permanence to my family's residence and I want to do so not by spatial conquest but by building a contemporary villa".

Amid vociferous exchanges in the local Split-based press invoking "civic pride" and "investor flight out of the city", including Ivanišević himself complaining about being "chased out of Split to Zagreb", the Split city council granted its hometown hero, Wimbledon champion Ivanišević, a special status for both projects: his family home construction project in Meje and his tennis academy project in Duilovo.

By 2006, the construction of the new 1,500 m^{2} three-storey, five-bedroom villa designed by his relative, architect Vjeko Ivanišević on a 1,560 m^{2} plot of land was completed with extensive amenities such as an indoor and outdoor pool, Jacuzzi, sauna, weight room, and wine cellar. During the villa's early-to-mid 2000s construction, when not in tournaments, Ivanišević (an active professional tennis player until 2004) spent most of his time in Zagreb where he had already been owning multiple residential properties. However, even after retiring in 2004, contrary to his earlier pronouncements, he never moved into the Split villa once it was complete in 2006, instead continuing to reside in Zagreb with his model girlfriend Tatjana Dragović.

By January 2008, the retired tennis player announced the sale of his Split villa, putting it on the market for HRK57 million (~€7 million). The move instantly provoked angry reactions in the Croatian public and Split-based media outlets with accusations of "exploiting his hometown hero status" and "not only emotionally blackmailing his fellow Splićani but also outright lying to them" being directed at Ivanišević.

After more than four years on the market and multiple re-listings with a lower asking price—including being offered in 2010 through the British real estate agency Savills that advertised it in the English press during fall 2010 as a high-end weekend escape property—the villa (that had been listed for HRK31 million as of summer 2011) was in May 2012 sold to the Hvar-born, Russia-based Croatian businessman Stefano Vlahović for an undisclosed amount widely speculated to be less than half of the amount Ivanišević originally asked for.

In addition to never using the villa as a family home, thus breaking the pledge made in his 2001 city of Split urban development plan change application, Ivanišević also failed to deliver on another promise he made in the same application—that of building a youth tennis academy in Duilovo. Instead, in 2012, the Split city authorities allowed the retired tennis player to once again re-purpose his 40,000 m^{2} Duilovo plot of land under the city development plan, this time for mixed usage, all of which was a prelude to Ivanišević selling the land in 2015 to the real estate developer Ciril Zovko.

=== Sports administration ===
In August 2005 Ivanišević got voted to be one of four vice-presidents of the Croatian Olympic Committee (HOO) working under president Zlatko Mateša.

=== Coaching ===
==== Marin Čilić (2013—2016) ====
In June 2013, in the wake of Marin Čilić's doping-related nine-month suspension that came into effect in the middle of his 2013 Wimbledon participation, the player reached out to his compatriot Ivanišević to become his new coach. Čilić's suspension was eventually reduced to 4 months.

Čilić won the 2014 US Open under Ivanišević's guidance. The two split after the 2016 Wimbledon where Čilić lost a tough five-set quarterfinal match to Roger Federer having initially been up 2-sets-to-none.

==== Tomáš Berdych (2016—2017) ====
Only weeks after Ivanišević's split with Čilić, Tomáš Berdych announced on 8 August 2016 via social media that Ivanišević will begin coaching him, starting at 2016 Western & Southern Open.

In early June 2017, immediately after Berdych's second round upset loss to unseeded Karen Khachanov at the 2017 French Open, the 14th-ranked ATP player Berdych fired his coach Ivanišević.

==== Milos Raonic (2018—2019) ====
In February 2018, the 31st-ranked ATP player and 2016 Wimbledon finalist Milos Raonic—having had his 2017 season marked by prolonged layoffs due to wrist and knee injury issues in addition to just coming off being eliminated from the Australian Open in a first round upset to unseeded Lukáš Lacko—looked to hire a new coach by holding separate trials with Jonas Björkman during the Delray Beach Open and Ivanišević during the Indian Wells Masters. Soon after, having made the semifinals at Indian Wells, Raonic hired Ivanišević.

Ivanišević coached Raonic until just before the 2019 Indian Wells Masters, when Raonic announced that he would be getting a new coach Fabrice Santoro. In a December 2019 interview, ten months removed from his collaboration with Raonic, Ivanišević (now coaching Novak Djokovic) described the experience of coaching Raonic as being "filled with struggles due to lack of proper communication", likening it to "talking to a wall" and adding that Raonic should have gotten a psychiatrist instead of a coach.

==== Novak Djokovic (2019—2024) ====
On 30 June 2019, Novak Djokovic confirmed that he had added Ivanišević to his coaching team. Working alongside Djokovic's existing coach Marian Vajda, Ivanišević's first order of business was the 2019 Wimbledon. However, due to a previously agreed commitment—exhibition match versus Goran Prpić ahead of the 2019 Croatia Open in Umag—he could be with Djokovic at Wimbledon for only the first week of the tournament, thus missing Djokovic's epic final win versus Roger Federer. Discussing his initial week-long interaction with Djokovic, Ivanišević praised the player's "perfectionism", stating to have felt "wanted as a coach for the first time in a long time" while simultaneously experiencing the "pleasure of coaching an individual that asks questions and actually listens to and processes what you have to say" and adding that he has "tragically had a more meaningful and worthwhile communication with Djokovic in an hour than with Raonic in the entire year".

On 27 March 2024, Novak Djokovic announced their separation.

==== Elena Rybakina (2025) ====
On 1 November 2024, Elena Rybakina confirmed that she had hired Ivanišević as her new coach, with the partnership set to begin with the 2025 WTA Tour.

After the Australian Open 2025, late January of the same year, he announced that he has ended his coaching stint with world number six Elena Rybakina after her Australian Open exit and its trial period.

==== Stefanos Tsitsipas (2025) ====
In May 2025 it was announced that Ivanisevic was hired as coach by Stefanos Tsitsipas. The partnership ended in July 2025 after just two months, following public criticism from Ivanišević regarding Tsitsipas's fitness and preparation levels after the Greek player's first-round retirement at Wimbledon due to injury.

== Personal life ==
=== Marriages, relationships, and children ===
During the early 1990s, several years after turning professional, young tennis player Ivanišević began dating the Croatian model and 1990 Queen of the World beauty pageant winner Daniela Mihalić, two years his senior. The couple soon moved in together, residing in his properties in both Split and Monte Carlo. The relationship ended in the mid-1990s after five years together; following the split, Mihalić would go on to marry football coach Nenad Gračan.

In 1998, 27-year-old Ivanišević began dating 17-year-old Serbian-Croatian model Tatjana Dragović after reportedly seeing her on the cover of the Cosmopolitan magazine's September 1996 edition and subsequently obtaining her phone number by contacting her New York City-based modeling agency, Elite. Ivanišević married Dragović in 2009 and they have two children, Amber Maria and Emanuel. Their official divorce proceedings, reportedly initiated by Dragović, began in April 2013.

He has one child, Oliver, with his second wife Nives Čanović.

His eldest son Emanuel is also playing tennis. In 2023, he has won U-16 Croatian doubles championships.

=== Political endorsements ===
==== Support for Croat generals indicted for war crimes ====
In July 2001, fresh off winning Wimbledon, Ivanišević reportedly joined 10 other prominent Croatian professional athletes in addressing the Croatian government and parliament via signing an open letter expressing their disapproval of the Croatian authorities' (under Prime Minister Ivica Račan) decision to co-operate with the International Criminal Tribunal for the former Yugoslavia (ICTY) in The Hague by handing over two Croatian Army generals indicted for crimes against humanity during Yugoslav Wars, Rahim Ademi and Ante Gotovina. Claiming to be speaking up out of "human and moral obligation to our greatest heroes", the 11 athletes express being horrified at the Croatian government's decision to hand over war crimes suspects, seeing it as an attempt to "distort historical facts" before concluding that the "one and only truth is that Croatia was a victim [in the Yugoslav Wars] while its soldiers and generals were heroes". Among the other Croatian athletes that signed the letter were Zvonimir Boban, Alen Bokšić, Davor Šuker, Slaven Bilić, Igor Štimac, Aljoša Asanović, Dino Rađa, and Stojko Vranković.

The letter caused immediate reaction in Croatia, including Science and Higher Education Union (NSZ) sarcastically dismissing the signatories as "pro athletes on their yachts and in their Ferraris [who] would certainly not be feeling the pain of resulting international political and economic sanctions inflicted upon Croatia were it to refuse co-operation with the ICTY". The reaction to the letter prompted Ivanišević's father Srđan to come out with a claim that his son's signature on the letter is a "forgery designed to publicly embarrass him due to his well-known opposition to extradition of any Croats to the Hague tribunal". For his part, when asked about the signature, Ivanišević himself claimed "to not remember signing it" but that he nevertheless "agrees with its points".

==== Croatian Democratic Union (HDZ) ====
Throughout 2007, ahead of the 2007 Croatian parliamentary election, retired tennis player Ivanišević participated in promoting the ruling Croatian Democratic Union (HDZ) of incumbent Prime Minister Ivo Sanader via personal appearances at campaign stops and in television ads.

At a late June 2007 rally at the Dražen Petrović Basketball Hall, where he arrived with his pregnant girlfriend Tatjana Dragović, Ivanišević addressed the crowd using tennis analogies: "Over the previous 4 years, we [Croatia led by Sanader and the HDZ] learned the backhand, forehand, and baseline play; and in the last 10 years we've mastered the serve; now, we have to learn net play by being accepted into the European Union". Also endorsing the HDZ on this campaign trail were other prominent Croatian sporting figures such as retired basketball star Dino Rađa, active footballers Niko Kovač and Tomislav Butina, retired water polo player Zdeslav Vrdoljak, retired basketball players Franjo Arapović and Stojko Vranković, handball coach Lino Červar, retired handballer Slavko Goluža, football administrators Zdravko and Zoran Mamić, boxer Stipe Drviš, active water polo players Teo Đogaš, Mile Smodlaka, and Josip Pavić, and active handballers Ivano Balić, Petar Metličić, and Renato Sulić.

Weeks prior to the election, the HDZ released a number of television ads with the sporting figures endorsing the party. One such ad features Ivanišević delivering a tennis pun into the camera by stating that he "trusts Sanader and his aces". In March 2008, months following the election that the HDZ had won, responding to an interview question about his motivation to endorse the HDZ, Ivanišević claimed to have been "supporting PM Sanader, not the HDZ", adding that he believes in Sanader.

== See also ==
- List of Grand Slam men's singles champions

== Filmography and television ==
=== Film ===
Film
Year	Title	Role	Notes
2001	Wimbledon Official Film 2001	Himself	

=== Television ===
Television
Year	Title	Role	Notes
2005	Mjenjačnica	Himself	

=== Music videos ===
Music Videos
Year	Artist	Title	Notes
2007	Nina Badrić	"Da se opet tebi vratim"	Croatian music video

== Video ==
- Wimbledon 2001 Final: Rafter Vs Ivanišević Standing Room Only, DVD Release Date: 30 October 2007, Run Time: 195 minutes, ASIN: B000V02CT6.

Awards and achievements
Preceded by (Russia) Marat Safin	ATP Most Improved Player; 2001	Succeeded by (Thailand) Paradorn Srichaphan
Preceded by (United States) Tiger Woods	BBC Overseas Sports Personality of the Year; 2001	Succeeded by (Brazil) Ronaldo
Preceded by (United States) Jennifer Capriati	Laureus World Sports Award for Comeback of the Year; 2001	Succeeded by (Brazil) Ronaldo
Preceded by (United States) Jim Courier (Spain) Sergi Bruguera	ATP Champions Tour; Year-End No.1; 2005; 2008	Succeeded by (Chile) Marcelo Ríos (Sweden) Thomas Enqvist
Olympic Games
Preceded by None	Flagbearer for Croatia; Barcelona 1992	Succeeded by Perica Bukić
