= 1987 Stockholm Open – Doubles =

Doubles
- 1987 Stockholm Open

Final
- Champions: (Sweden) Stefan Edberg (Sweden) Anders Järryd
- Runners-up: (United States) Jim Grabb (United States) Jim Pugh
- Score: 6–3, 6–4

Events
Singles	Doubles
← 1986 ·	Stockholm Open	· 1988 →

Sherwood Stewart and Kim Warwick were the defending champions, but did not participate this year.

Stefan Edberg and Anders Järryd won the title, defeating Jim Grabb and Jim Pugh 6–3, 6–4 in the final.

== Seeds ==
1. (Sweden) Stefan Edberg / (Sweden) Anders Järryd (champions)
2. (United States) Ken Flach / (United States) Robert Seguso (quarterfinals)
3. (Spain) Sergio Casal / (Spain) Emilio Sánchez (second round)
4. (United States) Jim Grabb / (United States) Jim Pugh (final)
5. (Denmark) Michael Mortensen / (United States) Tim Wilkison (first round)
6. (United States) Mel Purcell / (Sweden) Mats Wilander (first round)
7. (New Zealand) Kelly Evernden / (Australia) John Fitzgerald (semifinals)
8. (Spain) Javier Sánchez / (Sweden) Jonas Svensson (first round)

== Draw ==
=== Key ===
- Q = Qualifier
- WC = Wild card
- LL = Lucky loser
- Alt = Alternate
- SE = Special exempt
- PR = Protected ranking
- ITF = ITF entry
- JE = Junior exempt
- w/o = Walkover
- r = Retired
- d = Defaulted
- SR = Special ranking

=== Finals ===
Semifinals
1	(Sweden) Stefan Edberg (Sweden) Anders Järryd	w/o
(United States) Kelly Jones (United States) Todd Nelson
4	(United States) Jim Grabb (United States) Jim Pugh	6	6
7	(New Zealand) Kelly Evernden (Australia) John Fitzgerald	2	4

Final
1	(Sweden) Stefan Edberg (Sweden) Anders Järryd	6	6
4	(United States) Jim Grabb (United States) Jim Pugh	3	4

=== Top half ===
First round
LL	(Austria) A Antonitsch (West Germany) P Kühnen	3	4
WC	(Sweden) L-A Wahlgren (Sweden) J Windahl	6	6
(United States) R Baxter (United States) J Rive	6	7
(Sweden) R Båthman (United States) B Dickinson	4	5
(Canada) G Connell (United States) L Shiras	6	7
8	(Spain) J Sánchez (Sweden) J Svensson	4	6
WC	(Sweden) M Gustafsson (Sweden) F Waern	4	1
(United States) K Jones (United States) T Nelson	6	6
(Italy) P Canè (Italy) F Cancellotti	6	6
(Italy) D Nargiso (Sweden) M Tideman	4	2
(Sweden) J Nyström (Sweden) M Pernfors	6	6
6	(United States) M Purcell (Sweden) M Wilander	3	4

Second round
1	(Sweden) S Edberg (Sweden) A Järryd	6	6
WC	(Sweden) L-A Wahlgren (Sweden) J Windahl	3	4
(United States) R Baxter (United States) J Rive	2	5
(Canada) G Connell (United States) L Shiras	6	7
3	(Spain) S Casal (Spain) E Sánchez	4	4
(United States) K Jones (United States) T Nelson	6	6
(Italy) P Canè (Italy) F Cancellotti	6	4
(Sweden) J Nyström (Sweden) M Pernfors	7	6

Quarterfinals
1	(Sweden) S Edberg (Sweden) A Järryd	6	6
(Canada) G Connell (United States) L Shiras	3	3
(United States) K Jones (United States) T Nelson	6	1	6
(Sweden) J Nyström (Sweden) M Pernfors	2	6	2

Semifinals
1	(Sweden) S Edberg (Sweden) A Järryd	w/o
(United States) K Jones (United States) T Nelson

=== Bottom half ===
First round
5	(Denmark) M Mortensen (United States) T Wilkinson	4	4
(Sweden) J Gunnarsson (Sweden) P Lundgren	6	6
(Czechoslovakia) J Čihák (Czechoslovakia) C Suk	6	6
WC	(Sweden) C Bergström (Sweden) U Stenlund	4	4
(Sweden) T Svantesson (Spain) A Tous	7	6
(United States) J Arias (South Africa) C Campbell	5	2
7	(New Zealand) K Evernden (Australia) J Fitzgerald	6	6
(Nigeria) N Odizor (United States) B Testerman	3	4
(United States) M Anger (United States) G Holmes	6	3	6
(West Germany) E Jelen (West Germany) W Popp	4	6	7
(United States) M Dickson (Czechoslovakia) J Navrátil	3	6	7
(United States) D Goldie (United States) H Pfister	6	3	5

Second round
(Sweden) J Gunnarsson (Sweden) P Lundgren	6	3	3
(Czechoslovakia) J Čihák (Czechoslovakia) C Suk	2	6	6
(Sweden) T Svantesson (Spain) A Tous	4	7	3
4	(United States) J Grabb (United States) J Pugh	6	6	6
7	(New Zealand) K Evernden (Australia) J Fitzgerald	6	6
(West Germany) E Jelen (West Germany) W Popp	2	2
(United States) M Dickson (Czechoslovakia) J Navrátil	3	2
2	(United States) K Flach (United States) R Seguso	6	6

Quarterfinals
(Czechoslovakia) J Čihák (Czechoslovakia) C Suk	2	6	1
4	(United States) J Grabb (United States) J Pugh	6	3	6
7	(New Zealand) K Evernden (Australia) J Fitzgerald	4	6	6
2	(United States) K Flach (United States) R Seguso	6	4	3

Semifinals
4	(United States) J Grabb (United States) J Pugh	6	6
7	(New Zealand) K Evernden (Australia) J Fitzgerald	2	4
