= 1991 Stockholm Open – Doubles =

Doubles
- 1991 Stockholm Open

Final
- Champions: (Australia) John Fitzgerald (Sweden) Anders Järryd
- Runners-up: (Netherlands) Tom Nijssen (Czechoslovakia) Cyril Suk
- Score: 7–5, 6–2

Details
- Draw: 24
- Seeds: 8

Events
Singles	Doubles
← 1990 ·	Stockholm Open	· 1992 →

Guy Forget and Jakob Hlasek were the defending champions, but Forget did not participate this year. Hlasek partnered Patrick McEnroe, losing in the quarterfinals.

John Fitzgerald and Anders Järryd won the title, defeating Tom Nijssen and Cyril Suk 7–5, 6–2 in the final.

== Seeds ==
All seeds receive a bye into the second round.

1. (Australia) John Fitzgerald / (Sweden) Anders Järryd (champions)
2. (United States) Scott Davis / (United States) David Pate (second round)
3. (Canada) Grant Connell / (Canada) Glenn Michibata (second round)
4. (United States) Ken Flach / (United States) Robert Seguso (second round)
5. (United States) Patrick Galbraith / (United States) Todd Witsken (semifinals)
6. (United States) Luke Jensen / (Australia) Laurie Warder (semifinals)
7. (Germany) Udo Riglewski / (Germany) Michael Stich (second round)
8. (South Africa) Wayne Ferreira / (South Africa) Piet Norval (second round)

== Draw ==
=== Key ===
- Q = Qualifier
- WC = Wild card
- LL = Lucky loser
- Alt = Alternate
- SE = Special exempt
- PR = Protected ranking
- ITF = ITF entry
- JE = Junior exempt
- w/o = Walkover
- r = Retired
- d = Defaulted
- SR = Special ranking

=== Finals ===
Semifinals
1	(Australia) John Fitzgerald (Sweden) Anders Järryd	6	6
5	(United States) Patrick Galbraith (United States) Todd Witsken	3	2
6	(United States) Luke Jensen (Australia) Laurie Warder	4	6	6
(Netherlands) Tom Nijssen (Czech Republic) Cyril Suk	6	3	7

Final
1	(Australia) John Fitzgerald (Sweden) Anders Järryd	7	6
(Netherlands) Tom Nijssen (Czech Republic) Cyril Suk	5	2

=== Top half ===
First round
(Australia) M Kratzmann (Australia) W Masur	4	7	6
(Netherlands) M Koevermans (Belgium) L Pimek	6	6	2
(United States) R Reneberg (Sweden) T Svantesson	3	6
(United States) S DeVries (Australia) D Macpherson	6	7
(United States) K Jones (United States) R Leach	6	6
WC	(Germany) B Becker (Sweden) J Svensson	3	4
(Italy) O Camporese (Croatia) G Ivanišević	7	6
(United States) C Beckman (United States) S Salumaa	6	3

Second round
1	(Australia) J Fitzgerald (Sweden) A Järryd	6	3	7
(Australia) M Kratzmann (Australia) W Masur	4	6	6
(United States) S DeVries (Australia) D Macpherson	3	7	7
8	(South Africa) W Ferreira (South Africa) P Norval	6	6	6
4	(United States) K Flach (United States) R Seguso	6	4
(United States) K Jones (United States) R Leach	7	6
(Italy) O Camporese (Croatia) G Ivanišević	6	6
5	(United States) P Galbraith (United States) T Witsken	7	7

Quarterfinals
1	(Australia) J Fitzgerald (Sweden) A Järryd	6	6
(United States) S DeVries (Australia) D Macpherson	4	4
(United States) K Jones (United States) R Leach	4	6	3
5	(United States) P Galbraith (United States) T Witsken	6	4	6

Semifinals
1	(Australia) J Fitzgerald (Sweden) A Järryd	6	6
5	(United States) P Galbraith (United States) T Witsken	3	2

=== Bottom half ===
First round
(United States) K Kinnear (United States) B Pearce	3	2
Q	(Sweden) P Henricsson (Sweden) O Jonsson	6	6
(United Kingdom) N Broad (South Africa) D Visser	6	6
(Netherlands) HJ Davids (Netherlands) J Siemerink	3	4
(Sweden) R Båthman (Sweden) R Bergh	3	6	3
(Netherlands) T Nijssen (Czech Republic) C Suk	6	3	6
(Switzerland) J Hlasek (United States) P McEnroe	6	6
WC	(Czechoslovakia) I Lendl (Australia) T Woodbridge	3	2

Second round
6	(United States) L Jensen (Australia) L Warder	7	6
Q	(Sweden) P Henricsson (Sweden) O Jonsson	6	4
(United Kingdom) N Broad (South Africa) D Visser	6	7
3	(Canada) G Connell (Canada) G Michibata	3	6
7	(Germany) U Riglewski (Germany) M Stich	5	3
(Netherlands) T Nijssen (Czech Republic) C Suk	7	6
(Switzerland) J Hlasek (United States) P McEnroe	6	6	6
2	(United States) S Davis (United States) D Pate	4	7	3

Quarterfinals
6	(United States) L Jensen (Australia) L Warder	6	6
(United Kingdom) N Broad (South Africa) D Visser	3	4
(Netherlands) T Nijssen (Czech Republic) C Suk	6	6
(Switzerland) J Hlasek (United States) P McEnroe	1	4

Semifinals
6	(United States) L Jensen (Australia) L Warder	4	6	6
(Netherlands) T Nijssen (Czech Republic) C Suk	6	3	7
