= 1990 Stockholm Open – Singles =

Singles
- 1990 Stockholm Open

Final
- Champion: (Germany) Boris Becker
- Runner-up: (Sweden) Stefan Edberg
- Score: 6–4, 6–0, 6–3

Details
- Draw: 48
- Seeds: 16

Events
Singles	Doubles
← 1989 ·	Stockholm Open	· 1991 →

Boris Becker defeated Stefan Edberg in the final, 6–4, 6–0, 6–3 to win the singles tennis title at the 1990 Stockholm Open.

Ivan Lendl was the reigning champion, but did not compete that year.

== Seeds ==
All sixteen seeds received a bye to the second round.

1. (Sweden) Stefan Edberg (final)
2. (Germany) Boris Becker (champion)
3. (United States) Andre Agassi (second round)
4. (United States) Pete Sampras (semifinals)
5. (Ecuador) Andrés Gómez (second round)
6. (Spain) Emilio Sánchez (second round)
7. (United States) Brad Gilbert (quarterfinals)
8. (United States) John McEnroe (third round)
9. (Socialist Federal Republic of Yugoslavia) Goran Ivanišević (quarterfinals)
10. (Soviet Union) Andrei Chesnokov (third round)
11. (United States) Aaron Krickstein (second round)
12. (United States) Michael Chang (third round)
13. (France) Guy Forget (third round)
14. (Argentina) Guillermo Pérez Roldán (second round)
15. (Sweden) Jonas Svensson (second round)
16. (United States) Jay Berger (second round)

== Draw ==
=== Key ===
- Q = Qualifier
- WC = Wild card
- LL = Lucky loser
- Alt = Alternate
- SE = Special exempt
- PR = Protected ranking
- ITF = ITF entry
- JE = Junior exempt
- w/o = Walkover
- r = Retired
- d = Defaulted
- SR = Special ranking

=== Finals ===
Quarterfinals
1	(Sweden) Stefan Edberg	6	3	6
7	(United States) Brad Gilbert	4	6	1
WC	(Sweden) Nicklas Kulti	2	1
(Soviet Union) Alexander Volkov	6	6
(United States) David Wheaton	6	7	4
4	(United States) Pete Sampras	7	5	6
9	(Socialist Federal Republic of Yugoslavia) Goran Ivanišević	4	2
2	(Germany) Boris Becker	6	6

Semifinals
1	(Sweden) Stefan Edberg	7	6
(Soviet Union) Alexander Volkov	6	2
4	(United States) Pete Sampras	4	4
2	(Germany) Boris Becker	6	6

Final
1	(Sweden) Stefan Edberg	4	0	3
2	(Germany) Boris Becker	6	6	6

=== Top half ===
==== Section 1 ====
First round
WC	(Sweden) M Wilander	7	6	6
Q	(Australia) T Woodbridge	5	7	0
(Switzerland) M Rosset	2	6	6
(United States) D Rostagno	6	2	2
(United States) J Courier	6	6
LL	(Australia) B Dyke	1	3
(Switzerland) J Hlasek	6	6
(Soviet Union) A Cherkasov	3	4

Second round
1	(Sweden) S Edberg	6	6
WC	(Sweden) M Wilander	4	3
(Switzerland) M Rosset	6	7	7
15	(Sweden) J Svensson	7	6	6
10	(Soviet Union) A Chesnokov	3	6	7
(United States) J Courier	6	3	5
(Switzerland) J Hlasek	3	6
7	(United States) B Gilbert	6	7

Third round
1	(Sweden) S Edberg	6	6
(Switzerland) M Rosset	4	4
10	(Soviet Union) A Chesnokov	3	4
7	(United States) B Gilbert	6	6

Quarterfinals
1	(Sweden) S Edberg	6	3	6
7	(United States) B Gilbert	4	6	1

==== Section 2 ====
First round
(United States) T Mayotte	4	6
WC	(Sweden) N Kulti	6	7
Q	(Sweden) M Larsson	6	6
LL	(Sweden) D Engel	3	4
(Sweden) M Gustafsson	7	6
(Australia) R Fromberg	6	1
(Germany) C-U Steeb	6	4	3
(Soviet Union) A Volkov	4	6	6

Second round
3/WC	(United States) A Agassi	3	5
WC	(Sweden) N Kulti	6	7
Q	(Sweden) M Larsson	3	6	3
13	(France) G Forget	6	3	6
11	(United States) A Krickstein	2	3
(Sweden) M Gustafsson	6	6
(Soviet Union) A Volkov	7	6
6	(Spain) E Sánchez	5	3

Third round
WC	(Sweden) N Kulti	6	6
13	(France) G Forget	4	2
(Sweden) M Gustafsson	3	6
(Soviet Union) A Volkov	6	7

Quarterfinals
WC	(Sweden) N Kulti	2	1
(Soviet Union) A Volkov	6	6

=== Bottom half ===
==== Section 3 ====
First round
(United States) D Wheaton	6	7
Q	(Sweden) K Wedenby	6	3
(Argentina) M Jaite	6	6
(Uruguay) M Filippini	4	3
Q	(Sweden) J Gunnarsson	6	4	5
(Czechoslovakia) P Korda	4	6	7
WC	(Sweden) P Lundgren	4	6
Q	(Sweden) R Bergh	6	7

Second round
5	(Ecuador) A Gómez	7	3	1
(United States) D Wheaton	6	6	6
(Argentina) M Jaite	4	3
12	(United States) M Chang	6	6
14	(Argentina) G Pérez Roldán	3	4
(Czechoslovakia) P Korda	6	6
Q	(Sweden) R Bergh	6	7	3
4	(United States) P Sampras	7	6	6

Third round
(United States) D Wheaton	6	6	6
12	(United States) M Chang	7	2	3
(Czechoslovakia) P Korda	3	6	6
4	(United States) P Sampras	6	3	7

Quarterfinals
(United States) D Wheaton	6	7	4
4	(United States) P Sampras	7	5	6

==== Section 4 ====
First round
(Czechoslovakia) K Nováček	7	3	6
(Australia) W Masur	6	6	3
LL	(Mexico) L Lavalle	6	3	6
Q	(Sweden) H Holm	2	6	3
(Spain) S Bruguera	1	4
(United States) R Reneberg	6	6
(United States) K Curren	3	3
(Australia) D Cahill	6	6

Second round
8	(United States) J McEnroe	6	6	7
(Czechoslovakia) K Nováček	2	7	5
LL	(Mexico) L Lavalle	6	3
9	(Socialist Federal Republic of Yugoslavia) G Ivanišević	7	6
16	(United States) J Berger	3	3
(United States) R Reneberg	6	6
(Australia) D Cahill	2	0
2	(Germany) B Becker	6	6

Third round
8	(United States) J McEnroe	4	4
9	(Socialist Federal Republic of Yugoslavia) G Ivanišević	6	6
(United States) R Reneberg	4	3
2	(Germany) B Becker	6	6

Quarterfinals
9	(Socialist Federal Republic of Yugoslavia) G Ivanišević	4	2
2	(Germany) B Becker	6	6
