= 1987 Stockholm Open =

- Date: 2–8 November
- Edition: 19th
- Category: Grand Prix
- Draw: 56S / 28D
- Prize money: $425,000
- Surface: Hard / indoor
- Location: Stockholm, Sweden
- Venue: Kungliga tennishallen

Champions

Singles
- (Sweden) Stefan Edberg

Doubles
- (United States) Sherwood Stewart / (Australia) Kim Warwick
← 1986 ·	Stockholm Open	· 1988 →

The 1987 Stockholm Open was a men's tennis tournament played on indoor hard courts and part of the 1987 Nabisco Grand Prix; the tournament took place at the Kungliga tennishallen in Stockholm, Sweden. The tournament was held from 2 November until 8 November 1987. First-seeded Stefan Edberg won the singles title.

== Finals ==
=== Singles ===
(Sweden) Stefan Edberg defeated (Sweden) Jonas Svensson, 7–5, 6–2, 4–6, 6–4

- It was Edberg's 7th singles title of the year and the 15th of his career.

=== Doubles ===
(Sweden) Stefan Edberg / (Sweden) Anders Järryd defeated (United States) Jim Grabb / (United States) Jim Pugh, 6–3, 6–4
