= 1992 Australian Men's Hardcourt Championships – Singles =

Singles
- 1992 Australian Men's Hardcourt Championships

Final
- Champion: (Croatia) Goran Ivanišević
- Runner-up: (Sweden) Christian Bergström
- Score: 1–6, 7–6^{(7–5)}, 6–4

Details
- Draw: 32
- Seeds: 8

Events
Singles	Doubles
← 1991 ·	Australian Men's Hardcourt Championships	· 1993 →

Nicklas Kulti was the defending champion, but lost in the first round this year.

Goran Ivanišević defeated Christian Bergström 1–6, 7–6^{(7–5)}, 6–4 to secure the singles title of the 1992 Australian Men's Hardcourt Championships tennis tournament.

== Seeds ==
1. (Croatia) Goran Ivanišević (champion)
2. (Netherlands) Jan Siemerink (first round)
3. (Spain) Javier Sánchez (first round)
4. (Austria) Horst Skoff (second round)
5. (Austria) Thomas Muster (first round)
6. (Germany) Carl-Uwe Steeb (semifinals)
7. (France) Olivier Delaître (quarterfinals)
8. (Italy) Cristiano Caratti (first round)

== Draw ==
=== Key ===
- Q = Qualifier
- WC = Wild card
- LL = Lucky loser
- Alt = Alternate
- SE = Special exempt
- PR = Protected ranking
- ITF = ITF entry
- JE = Junior exempt
- w/o = Walkover
- r = Retired
- d = Defaulted
- SR = Special ranking

=== Finals ===
Semifinals
WC/1	(Croatia) Goran Ivanišević	6	6
(United States) Bryan Shelton	4	2
6	(Germany) Carl-Uwe Steeb	6^{7}	4
(Sweden) Christian Bergström	7^{9}	6

Final
WC/1	(Croatia) Goran Ivanišević	1	7^{7}	6
(Sweden) Christian Bergström	6	6^{5}	4

=== Top half ===
First round
WC/1	(Croatia) G Ivanišević	6	6
(Sweden) N Kulti	3	3
(United States) J Arias	2	6^{2}
(Italy) S Pescosolido	6	7^{7}
(Israel) A Mansdorf	3	7^{7}	6
Q	(Australia) G Doyle	6	6^{5}	4
(Switzerland) M Rosset	3	6	6
8	(Italy) C Caratti	6	3	3
3	(Spain) J Sánchez	5	7^{7}	6^{5}
(South Africa) C van Rensburg	7	6^{4}	7^{7}
(Italy) G Pozzi	3	6	6^{5}
(France) R Gilbert	6	3	7^{7}
(Sweden) M Larsson	2	4
(Germany) K Braasch	6	6
(United States) B Shelton	6	4	7^{7}
5	(Austria) T Muster	3	6	6^{1}

Second round
WC/1	(Croatia) G Ivanišević	6	6
(Italy) S Pescosolido	4	3
(Israel) A Mansdorf	6	3	2
(Switzerland) M Rosset	3	6	6
(South Africa) C van Rensburg	4	3
(France) R Gilbert	6	6
(Germany) K Braasch	6^{5}	3
(United States) B Shelton	7^{7}	6

Quarterfinals
WC/1	(Croatia) G Ivanišević	6	7^{7}
(Switzerland) M Rosset	4	6^{4}
(France) R Gilbert	5	4
(United States) B Shelton	7	6

Semifinals
WC/1	(Croatia) G Ivanišević	6	6
(United States) B Shelton	4	2

=== Bottom half ===
First round
6	(Germany) C-U Steeb	6	6
(Italy) R Furlan	1	4
WC	(Australia) S Stolle	6^{3}	6	6
(Germany) M Zoecke	7^{7}	2	4
Q	(Sweden) T Enqvist	3	6	6
Q	(Germany) A Finnberg	6	1	2
Q	(Australia) C Limberger	3	3
4	(Austria) H Skoff	6	6
7	(France) O Delaître	6^{2}	6	6
LL	(Germany) A Thoms	7^{7}	3	2
(Australia) M Woodforde	6	7^{7}
(Australia) J Stoltenberg	2	6^{3}
(Sweden) C Bergström	6	6
LL	(Australia) S Youl	3	4
WC	(Australia) J Fitzgerald	6	7^{7}
2	(Netherlands) J Siemerink	2	6^{3}

Second round
6	(Germany) C-U Steeb	4	6	6
WC	(Australia) S Stolle	6	2	3
Q	(Sweden) T Enqvist	6	1	6
4	(Austria) H Skoff	3	6	3
7	(France) O Delaître	6	6
(Australia) M Woodforde	4	4
(Sweden) C Bergström	6	6
WC	(Australia) J Fitzgerald	2	2

Quarterfinals
6	(Germany) C-U Steeb	7^{7}	7^{7}
Q	(Sweden) T Enqvist	6^{5}	6^{4}
7	(France) O Delaître	1	3
(Sweden) C Bergström	6	6

Semifinals
6	(Germany) C-U Steeb	6^{7}	4
(Sweden) C Bergström	7^{9}	6
