= 1988 Stockholm Open – Singles =

Singles
- 1988 Stockholm Open

Final
- Champion: (West Germany) Boris Becker
- Runner-up: (Sweden) Peter Lundgren
- Score: 6–4, 6–1, 6–1

Details
- Draw: 56
- Seeds: 16

Events
Singles	Doubles
← 1987 ·	Stockholm Open	· 1989 →

Stefan Edberg was the defending champion, but lost in the second round this year.

Boris Becker won the title, defeating Peter Lundgren 6–4, 6–1, 6–1 in the final.

== Seeds ==
1. (Sweden) Mats Wilander (third round)
2. (Sweden) Stefan Edberg (second round)
3. (West Germany) Boris Becker (champion)
4. (Czechoslovakia) Miloslav Mečíř (second round)
5. (Austria) Thomas Muster (third round)
6. (United States) Kevin Curren (second round)
7. (Spain) Emilio Sánchez (quarterfinals)
8. (Sweden) Anders Järryd (second round)
9. (Sweden) Jonas Svensson (third round)
10. (Sweden) Mikael Pernfors (third round)
11. (Australia) John Fitzgerald (second round)
12. (Haiti) Ronald Agénor (second round)
13. (Socialist Federal Republic of Yugoslavia) Slobodan Živojinović (first round)
14. (Sweden) Magnus Gustafsson (third round)
15. (United States) Dan Goldie (semifinals)
16. (United States) Derrick Rostagno (first round)

== Draw ==
=== Key ===
- Q = Qualifier
- WC = Wild card
- LL = Lucky loser
- Alt = Alternate
- SE = Special exempt
- PR = Protected ranking
- ITF = ITF entry
- JE = Junior exempt
- w/o = Walkover
- r = Retired
- d = Defaulted
- SR = Special ranking

=== Finals ===
Semifinals
15	(United States) Dan Goldie	3	2
3	(West Germany) Boris Becker	6	6
(Sweden) Peter Lundgren	6	6
(United States) Jim Courier	3	3

Final
3	(West Germany) Boris Becker	6	6	6
(Sweden) Peter Lundgren	4	1	1

=== Top half ===
==== Section 1 ====
First round
(Spain) S Casal	6	4	3
WC	(Sweden) N Kulti	2	6	6
(Czechoslovakia) M Šrejber	4	7	6
(West Germany) U Riglewski	6	6	7
(Canada) M Laurendeau	1	2
15	(United States) D Goldie	6	6
9	(Sweden) J Svensson	6	6
Q	(Finland) V Paloheimo	3	4
(Australia) J Frawley	6	6
(United Kingdom) J Bates	4	2
Q	(Sweden) J Windahl	2	4
WC	(Sweden) L Jonsson	6	6

Second round
1	(Sweden) M Wilander	0	6	6
WC	(Sweden) N Kulti	6	4	1
(West Germany) U Riglewski	3	6	5
15	(United States) D Goldie	6	4	7
9	(Sweden) J Svensson	6	7	6
(Australia) J Frawley	7	5	1
WC	(Sweden) L Jonsson	6	3	4
7	(Spain) E Sánchez	4	6	6

Third round
1	(Sweden) M Wilander	1	4
15	(United States) D Goldie	6	6
9	(Sweden) J Svensson	4	7	4
7	(Spain) E Sánchez	6	5	6

Quarterfinals
15	(United States) D Goldie	6	7
7	(Spain) E Sánchez	2	6

==== Section 2 ====
First round
WC	(Sweden) J Carlsson	6	6
(New Zealand) K Evernden	1	3
(United States) J Kriek	3	6	6
(West Germany) E Jelen	6	0	3
(United States) J Pugh	6	6
13	(Socialist Federal Republic of Yugoslavia) S Živojinović	3	4
11	(Australia) J Fitzgerald	7	7
Q	(West Germany) M Westphal	5	6
Q	(Sweden) J Sandberg	1	1
(United States) R Seguso	6	6
(United States) T Nelson	4	6	1
(United States) T Witsken	6	4	6

Second round
3	(West Germany) B Becker	6	2	6
WC	(Sweden) J Carlsson	2	6	3
(United States) J Kriek	7	6
(United States) J Pugh	5	2
11	(Australia) J Fitzgerald	4	7	1
(United States) R Seguso	6	5	6
(United States) T Witsken	7	2	3
5	(Austria) T Muster	5	6	6

Third round
3	(West Germany) B Becker	6	6
(United States) J Kriek	2	0
(United States) R Seguso	7	6
5	(Austria) T Muster	6	1

Quarterfinals
3	(West Germany) B Becker	6	7
(United States) R Seguso	4	6

=== Bottom half ===
==== Section 3 ====
First round
(United States) P Annacone	6	6	7
Q	(West Germany) P Baur	2	7	6
(Sweden) J Gunnarsson	5	7	6
(Mexico) J Lozano	7	5	3
(West Germany) P Kühnen	3	7	4
12	(Haiti) R Agénor	6	5	6
14	(Sweden) M Gustafsson	6	6
(Czechoslovakia) M Vajda	4	2
(Sweden) C Bergström	6	6
(United States) J Grabb	3	4
(Sweden) P Lundgren	6	6
(West Germany) C Saceanu	4	1

Second round
6	(United States) K Curren	6	5
(United States) P Annacone	7	7
(Sweden) J Gunnarsson	6	7
12	(Haiti) R Agénor	3	6
14	(Sweden) M Gustafsson	7	6
(Sweden) C Bergström	6	1
(Sweden) P Lundgren	6	7
4	(Czechoslovakia) M Mečíř	3	6

Third round
(United States) P Annacone	2	2
(Sweden) J Gunnarsson	6	6
14	(Sweden) M Gustafsson	3	0
(Sweden) P Lundgren	6	6

Quarterfinals
(Sweden) J Gunnarsson	4	4
(Sweden) P Lundgren	6	6

==== Section 4 ====
First round
(United States) J Courier	7	7
(Australia) B Dyke	5	6
Q	(Austria) A Antonitsch	7	5	4
(West Germany) C-U Steeb	6	7	6
Q	(Sweden) N Utgren	1	5
10	(Sweden) M Pernfors	6	7
16	(United States) D Rostagno	4	4
(West Germany) T Meinecke	6	6
WC	(Sweden) M Larsson	2	6	6
WC	(Sweden) T Svantesson	6	4	3
(Italy) P Canè	6	6
(United States) J Rive	4	1

Second round
8	(Sweden) A Järryd	3	3
(United States) J Courier	6	6
(West Germany) C-U Steeb	5	6	1
10	(Sweden) M Pernfors	7	3	6
(West Germany) T Meinecke	7	6
WC	(Sweden) M Larsson	6	4
(Italy) P Canè	4	6	6
2	(Sweden) S Edberg	6	3	1

Third round
(United States) J Courier	6	6
10	(Sweden) M Pernfors	3	2
(West Germany) T Meinecke	4	6	2
(Italy) P Canè	6	4	6

Quarterfinals
(United States) J Courier	4	6	7
(Italy) P Canè	6	2	6
