= 1992 Australian Men's Hardcourt Championships =

- Date: 30 December 1991 – 6 January 1992
- Edition: 48th
- Category: World Series
- Draw: 32S / 16D
- Prize money: $157,500
- Surface: Hard / outdoor
- Location: Adelaide, Australia
- Venue: Memorial Drive

Champions

Singles
- (Croatia) Goran Ivanišević

Doubles
- (Croatia) Goran Ivanišević / (Switzerland) Marc Rosset
- Australian Hard Court Championships

The 1992 Australian Men's Hard Court Championships was an ATP men's tennis tournament held at Memorial Drive in Adelaide, Australia which was part of the World Series of the 1992 ATP Tour. The tournament was held from 30 December 1991 to 6 January 1992. Goran Ivanišević won the singles title.

== Finals ==
=== Singles ===
(Croatia) Goran Ivanišević defeated (Sweden) Christian Bergström 1–6, 7–6^{(7–5)}, 6–4

- It was Ivanišević' 1st singles title of the year and the 3rd of his career.

=== Doubles ===
(Croatia) Goran Ivanišević / (Switzerland) Marc Rosset defeated (Australia) Mark Kratzmann / (Australia) Jason Stoltenberg 7–6, 7–6
