= 1990 Stockholm Open – Doubles =

Doubles
- 1990 Stockholm Open

Final
- Champions: (France) Guy Forget (Switzerland) Jakob Hlasek
- Runners-up: (Australia) John Fitzgerald (Sweden) Anders Järryd
- Score: 6–4, 6–2

Details
- Draw: 24
- Seeds: 8

Events
Singles	Doubles
← 1989 ·	Stockholm Open	· 1991 →

Jorge Lozano and Todd Witsken were the defending champions, but lost in the quarterfinals this year.

Guy Forget and Jakob Hlasek won the title, defeating John Fitzgerald and Anders Järryd 6–4, 6–2 in the final.

== Seeds ==
All eight seeded teams received byes to the second round.

1. (France) Guy Forget / (Switzerland) Jakob Hlasek (champions)
2. (Spain) Sergio Casal / (Spain) Emilio Sánchez (second round)
3. (Canada) Grant Connell / (Canada) Glenn Michibata (semifinals)
4. (United States) Scott Davis / (United States) David Pate (semifinals)
5. (Mexico) Jorge Lozano / (United States) Todd Witsken (quarterfinals)
6. (Australia) Darren Cahill / (Australia) Mark Kratzmann (quarterfinals)
7. (United States) Patrick Galbraith / (United States) Kelly Jones (quarterfinals)
8. (Socialist Federal Republic of Yugoslavia) Goran Ivanišević / (Czechoslovakia) Petr Korda (quarterfinals)

== Draw ==
=== Key ===
- Q = Qualifier
- WC = Wild card
- LL = Lucky loser
- Alt = Alternate
- SE = Special exempt
- PR = Protected ranking
- ITF = ITF entry
- JE = Junior exempt
- w/o = Walkover
- r = Retired
- d = Defaulted
- SR = Special ranking

=== Finals ===
Semifinals
1	(France) Guy Forget (Switzerland) Jakob Hlasek	4	7	6
4	(United States) Scott Davis (United States) David Pate	6	6	4
3	(Canada) Grant Connell (Canada) Glenn Michibata	4	6
(Australia) John Fitzgerald (Sweden) Anders Järryd	6	7

Final
1	(France) Guy Forget (Switzerland) Jakob Hlasek	6	6
(Australia) John Fitzgerald (Sweden) Anders Järryd	4	2

=== Top half ===
First round
(United States) C Beckman (Australia) D Macpherson	6	6	6
(United States) J Courier (Ecuador) A Gómez	3	7	7
(Australia) B Dyke (Sweden) P Lundgren	3	2
(Australia) W Masur (United States) S Salumaa	6	6
(United States) K Curren (United States) R Reneberg	3	5
WC	(Sweden) J Gunnarsson (Sweden) M Wilander	6	7
(Mexico) L Lavalle (Spain) J Sánchez	3	7	4
(United States) P Annacone (United States) D Wheaton	6	6	6

Second round
1	(France) G Forget (Switzerland) J Hlasek	6	6
(United States) J Courier (Ecuador) A Gómez	2	1
(Australia) W Masur (United States) S Salumaa	3	1
8	(Socialist Federal Republic of Yugoslavia) G Ivanišević (Czechoslovakia) P Korda	6	6
4	(United States) S Davis (United States) D Pate	6	3	6
WC	(Sweden) J Gunnarsson (Sweden) M Wilander	2	6	0
(United States) P Annacone (United States) D Wheaton	4	6	6
5	(Mexico) J Lozano (United States) T Witsken	6	3	7

Quarterfinals
1	(France) G Forget (Switzerland) J Hlasek	7	4	6
8	(Socialist Federal Republic of Yugoslavia) G Ivanišević (Czechoslovakia) P Korda	5	6	3
4	(United States) S Davis (United States) D Pate	6	6
5	(Mexico) J Lozano (United States) T Witsken	3	4

Semifinals
1	(France) G Forget (Switzerland) J Hlasek	4	7	6
4	(United States) S Davis (United States) D Pate	6	6	4

=== Bottom half ===
First round
WC	(Sweden) P Henricsson (Sweden) N Utgren	6	6
(United States) L Jensen (Netherlands) T Nijssen	3	4
(Netherlands) M Schapers (Czechoslovakia) T Šmíd	2	3
Q	(Czechoslovakia) K Nováček (Czechoslovakia) C Suk	6	6
(United States) J Grabb (United States) P McEnroe	6	6	4
(United States) S Melville (United States) J Pugh	3	7	6
(Australia) J Fitzgerald (Sweden) A Järryd	6	6
(Australia) J Stoltenberg (Australia) T Woodbridge	4	2

Second round
6	(Australia) D Cahill (Australia) M Kratzmann	7	6
WC	(Sweden) P Henricsson (Sweden) N Utgren	5	3
Q	(Czechoslovakia) K Nováček (Czechoslovakia) C Suk	4	4
3	(Canada) G Connell (Canada) G Michibata	6	6
7	(United States) P Galbraith (United States) K Jones	6	6
(United States) S Melville (United States) J Pugh	2	3
(Australia) J Fitzgerald (Sweden) A Järryd	6	4	6
2	(Spain) S Casal (Spain) E Sánchez	3	6	4

Quarterfinals
6	(Australia) D Cahill (Australia) M Kratzmann	6	3
3	(Canada) G Connell (Canada) G Michibata	7	6
7	(United States) P Galbraith (United States) K Jones	6	3	2
(Australia) J Fitzgerald (Sweden) A Järryd	3	6	6

Semifinals
3	(Canada) G Connell (Canada) G Michibata	4	6
(Australia) J Fitzgerald (Sweden) A Järryd	6	7
