= 1988 Stockholm Open =

- Date: 31 October – 6 November
- Edition: 20th
- Category: Grand Prix
- Draw: 56S / 28D
- Prize money: $450,000
- Surface: Hard / indoor
- Location: Stockholm, Sweden
- Venue: Kungliga tennishallen

Champions

Singles
- (West Germany) Boris Becker

Doubles
- (United States) Kevin Curren / (United States) Jim Grabb
← 1987 ·	Stockholm Open	· 1989 →

The 1988 Stockholm Open was a men's tennis tournament played on hard courts and part of the 1988 Nabisco Grand Prix and took place at the Kungliga tennishallen in Stockholm, Sweden. It was the 20th edition of the tournament and was held from 31 October through 6 November 1988. Third-seeded Boris Becker won the singles title.

== Finals ==
=== Singles ===
(West Germany) Boris Becker defeated (Sweden) Peter Lundgren, 6–4, 6–1, 6–1

- It was Becker's 6th singles title of the year and the 18th of his career.

=== Doubles ===
(United States) Kevin Curren / (United States) Jim Grabb defeated (United States) Paul Annacone / (Australia) John Fitzgerald, 7–5, 6–4
