= 1990 Stockholm Open =

- Date: 22–29 October
- Edition: 22nd
- Category: ATP Championship Series, Single Week
- Draw: 48S / 24D
- Prize money: 840,000
- Surface: Carpet / indoor
- Location: Stockholm, Sweden
- Venue: Stockholm Globe Arena

Champions

Singles
- (Germany) Boris Becker

Doubles
- (France) Guy Forget / (Switzerland) Jakob Hlasek
- Stockholm Open

The 1990 Stockholm Open was a men's tennis tournament played on indoor carpet courts. It was the 22nd edition of the Stockholm Open and was part of the ATP Championship Series, Single Week category of the 1990 ATP Tour. It took place at the Stockholm Globe Arena in Stockholm, Sweden, from 22 October through 29 October 1990.

The singles draw was headlined by world No. 1, Wimbledon champion, Los Angeles, New Haven, Indian Wells, Cincinnati titlist Stefan Edberg, Brussels, Indianapolis, Stuttgart indoor winner, Wimbledon runner-up Boris Becker and Key Biscayne, San Francisco, Washington champion, French Open, US Open finalist Andre Agassi. Other top seeds were US Open, Manchester winner Pete Sampras, French Open, Barcelona champion Andrés Gómez, Emilio Sánchez, Brad Gilbert and John McEnroe.

== Finals ==
=== Singles ===
(Germany) Boris Becker defeated (Sweden) Stefan Edberg, 6–4, 6–0, 6–3

- It was Becker's 5th singles title of the year, and the 29th of his career. It was his 1st Masters title.

=== Doubles ===
(France) Guy Forget / (Switzerland) Jakob Hlasek defeated (Australia) John Fitzgerald / (Sweden) Anders Järryd, 6–4, 6–2
