= 1996 St. Petersburg Open – Doubles =

Doubles
- 1996 St. Petersburg Open

Final
- Champions: (Russia) Yevgeny Kafelnikov (Russia) Andrei Olhovskiy
- Runners-up: (Sweden) Nicklas Kulti (Sweden) Peter Nyborg
- Score: 6–3, 6–4

Details
- Draw: 16
- Seeds: 4

Events
Singles	Doubles
← 1995 ·	St. Petersburg Open	· 1997 →

Martin Damm and Anders Järryd were the defending champions but only Järryd competed that year with Jan Apell.

Apell and Järryd lost in the first round to Wayne Arthurs and Jeff Tarango.

Yevgeny Kafelnikov and Andrei Olhovskiy won in the final 6–3, 6–4 against Nicklas Kulti and Peter Nyborg.

== Seeds ==
1. (Russia) Yevgeny Kafelnikov / (Russia) Andrei Olhovskiy (champions)
2. (Australia) Wayne Arthurs / (United States) Jeff Tarango (quarterfinals)
3. (Germany) David Prinosil / (Czech Republic) Daniel Vacek (semifinals, withdrew)
4. (Sweden) Nicklas Kulti / (Sweden) Peter Nyborg (final)

== Draw ==
=== Key ===
- Q = Qualifier
- WC = Wild card
- LL = Lucky loser
- Alt = Alternate
- SE = Special exempt
- PR = Protected ranking
- ITF = ITF entry
- JE = Junior exempt
- w/o = Walkover
- r = Retired
- d = Defaulted
- SR = Special ranking

First round
1	(Russia) Y Kafelnikov (Russia) A Olhovskiy	6	6
WC	(Germany) M Commandeur (Ukraine) D Poliakov	2	2
(Switzerland) L Manta (Czech Republic) P Vízner	7	3	7
(Spain) JA Conde (Portugal) N Marques	5	6	6
3	(Germany) D Prinosil (Czech Republic) D Vacek	6	7
(Belgium) L Pimek (South Africa) B Talbot	4	6
(Austria) A Antonitsch (Australia) J Ireland	6	7	6
WC	(Uzbekistan) O Ogorodov (Russia) A Volkov	7	5	7
(South Africa) M Barnard (Netherlands) T Kempers	6	6
WC	(Latvia) G Dzelde (Russia) A Filippov	2	3
(United Kingdom) N Broad (South Africa) P Norval	4	4
4	(Sweden) N Kulti (Sweden) P Nyborg	6	6
(South Africa) D Adams (Netherlands) H J Davids	6	6
Q	(Russia) A Stoliarov (Russia) I Tchelychev	2	2
(Sweden) J Apell (Sweden) A Järryd	1	3
2	(Australia) W Arthurs (United States) J Tarango	6	6

Quarterfinals
1	(Russia) Y Kafelnikov (Russia) A Olhovskiy	6	6
(Switzerland) L Manta (Czech Republic) P Vízner	4	4
3	(Germany) D Prinosil (Czech Republic) D Vacek	w/o
WC	(Uzbekistan) O Ogorodov (Russia) A Volkov
(South Africa) M Barnard (Netherlands) T Kempers
4	(Sweden) N Kulti (Sweden) P Nyborg	w/o
(South Africa) D Adams (Netherlands) H J Davids	6	6
2	(Australia) W Arthurs (United States) J Tarango	4	2

Semifinals
1	(Russia) Y Kafelnikov (Russia) A Olhovskiy	w/o
3	(Germany) D Prinosil (Czech Republic) D Vacek
4	(Sweden) N Kulti (Sweden) P Nyborg	7	6
(South Africa) D Adams (Netherlands) H J Davids	6	3

Final
1	(Russia) Y Kafelnikov (Russia) A Olhovskiy	6	6
4	(Sweden) N Kulti (Sweden) P Nyborg	3	4
