= 1998 St. Petersburg Open – Doubles =

Doubles
- 1998 St. Petersburg Open

Final
- Champions: (Sweden) Nicklas Kulti (Sweden) Mikael Tillström
- Runners-up: (South Africa) Marius Barnard (South Africa) Brent Haygarth
- Score: 3–6, 6–3, 7–6

Events
Singles	Doubles
← 1997 ·	St. Petersburg Open	· 1999 →

Andrei Olhovskiy and Brett Steven were the defending champions but did not compete that year.

Nicklas Kulti and Mikael Tillström won in the final 3–6, 6–3, 7–6 against Marius Barnard and Brent Haygarth.

== Seeds ==
1. (Czech Republic) Martin Damm / (Czech Republic) Daniel Vacek (first round)
2. n/a
3. n/a
4. (Sweden) Nicklas Kulti / (Sweden) Mikael Tillström (champions)

== Draw ==
=== Key ===
- Q = Qualifier
- WC = Wild card
- LL = Lucky loser
- Alt = Alternate
- ITF = ITF entry
- PR = Protected ranking
- SR = Special ranking
- SE = Special exempt
- JE = Junior exempt
- JR = Junior Accelerator Programme entrant
- CO = College Accelerator Programme entrant
- NG = Next Gen Accelerator Program entrant
- w/o = Walkover
- r = Retired
- d = Defaulted

First round
1	(Czech Republic) M Damm (Czech Republic) D Vacek	6	6
(South Africa) J-L de Jager (South Africa) R Koenig	7	7
(United States) G Grant (The Bahamas) M Merklein	4	6
Q	(South Africa) M Barnard (South Africa) B Haygarth	6	7
(South Africa) D Adams (Belgium) L Pimek	6	7
(United States) K Kinnear (South Africa) M Ondruska	1	6
(United States) T.J. Middleton (Netherlands) S Noteboom	2	4
(Netherlands) T Kempers (Netherlands) M Oosting	6	6
WC	(Latvia) Ģ Dzelde (Russia) A Tchernenko	7	6
(Germany) M Commandeur (Germany) L Rehmann	6	2
(Germany) D Prinosil (Switzerland) M Rosset	2	6	6
4	(Sweden) N Kulti (Sweden) M Tillström	6	3	7
(Italy) C Brandi (Italy) F Messori	3	5
WC	(Slovakia) D Hrbatý (Sweden) T Johansson	6	7
(United Kingdom) D Sapsford (United Kingdom) C Wilkinson	7	7
WC	(France) O Delaître (France) F Santoro	6	6

Quarterfinals
(South Africa) J-L de Jager (South Africa) R Koenig	3	4
Q	(South Africa) M Barnard (South Africa) B Haygarth	6	6
(South Africa) D Adams (Belgium) L Pimek	6	6	6
(Netherlands) T Kempers (Netherlands) M Oosting	3	7	7
WC	(Latvia) Ģ Dzelde (Russia) A Tchernenko	5	0
4	(Sweden) N Kulti (Sweden) M Tillström	7	6
WC	(Slovakia) D Hrbatý (Sweden) T Johansson	7	7
(United Kingdom) D Sapsford (United Kingdom) C Wilkinson	5	6

Semifinals
Q	(South Africa) M Barnard (South Africa) B Haygarth	7	6
(Netherlands) T Kempers (Netherlands) M Oosting	5	4
4	(Sweden) N Kulti (Sweden) M Tillström	7	1	6
WC	(Slovakia) D Hrbatý (Sweden) T Johansson	5	6	3

Final
Q	(South Africa) M Barnard (South Africa) B Haygarth	6	3	6
4	(Sweden) N Kulti (Sweden) M Tillström	3	6	7
