= 1998 St. Petersburg Open – Singles =

Singles
- 1998 St. Petersburg Open

Final
- Champion: (Netherlands) Richard Krajicek
- Runner-up: (Switzerland) Marc Rosset
- Score: 6–4, 7–6^{(7–5)}

Details
- Draw: 32
- Seeds: 8

Events
Singles	Doubles
← 1997 ·	St. Petersburg Open	· 1999 →

Thomas Johansson was the defending champion but lost in the semifinal 6–4, 6–4 against Richard Krajicek.

Richard Krajicek won in the final 6–4, 7–6^{(7–5)} against Marc Rosset.

== Seeds ==
1. (Netherlands) Richard Krajicek (champion)
2. (France) Cédric Pioline (semifinals)
3. (France) Fabrice Santoro (quarterfinals)
4. (Switzerland) Marc Rosset (final)
5. (Sweden) Thomas Johansson (semifinals)
6. (Slovakia) Dominik Hrbatý (quarterfinals)
7. (Germany) Marc-Kevin Goellner (second round)
8. (Czech Republic) Daniel Vacek (quarterfinals)

== Draw ==
=== Key ===
- Q = Qualifier
- WC = Wild card
- LL = Lucky loser
- Alt = Alternate
- SE = Special exempt
- PR = Protected ranking
- ITF = ITF entry
- JE = Junior exempt
- w/o = Walkover
- r = Retired
- d = Defaulted
- SR = Special ranking

=== Finals ===
Semifinals
1	(Netherlands) Richard Krajicek	6	6
5	(Sweden) Thomas Johansson	4	4
4	(Switzerland) Marc Rosset	6	6
2	(France) Cédric Pioline	1	4

Final
1	(Netherlands) Richard Krajicek	6	7^{7}
4	(Switzerland) Marc Rosset	4	6^{5}

=== Top half ===
First round
1	(Netherlands) R Krajicek	6	4	6
(Slovakia) J Krošlák	1	6	3
(Czech Republic) M Damm	6	2	6^{6}
(Germany) D Prinosil	3	6	7^{8}
(Czech Republic) R Vašek	7^{7}	3	3
(Germany) J Knippschild	6^{3}	6	6
(Italy) R Furlan	3	6^{2}
8	(Czech Republic) D Vacek	6	7^{7}
3	(France) F Santoro	7^{7}	6
(France) A Boetsch	6^{4}	3
Q	(France) J-F Bachelot	7	6
(Romania) D Pescariu	5	3
Q	(Germany) L Burgsmüller	2	4
(Italy) D Sanguinetti	6	6
(Italy) G Pozzi	6^{2}	2
5	(Sweden) T Johansson	7^{7}	6

Second round
1	(Netherlands) R Krajicek	6^{2}	6	6
(Germany) D Prinosil	7^{7}	4	2
(Germany) J Knippschild	2	1	r
8	(Czech Republic) D Vacek	6	2
3	(France) F Santoro	6	7
Q	(France) J-F Bachelot	3	5
(Italy) D Sanguinetti	2	2
5	(Sweden) T Johansson	6	6

Quarterfinals
1	(Netherlands) R Krajicek	7^{7}	6
8	(Czech Republic) D Vacek	6^{4}	1
3	(France) F Santoro	3	3
5	(Sweden) T Johansson	6	6

Semifinals
1	(Netherlands) R Krajicek	6	6
5	(Sweden) T Johansson	4	4

=== Bottom half ===
First round
6	(Slovakia) D Hrbatý	6	6
(Germany) R Schüttler	3	4
Q	(Sweden) N Kulti	6	2
(Austria) G Schaller	2	0^{r}
Q	(France) O Delaître	7	6
(France) J Golmard	5	1
WC	(Russia) A Tchernenko	2	3
4	(Switzerland) M Rosset	6	6
7	(Germany) M-K Goellner	6	7
(Spain) JA Marín	4	5
WC	(Russia) K Ivanov-Smolensky	1	2
(Germany) H Dreekmann	6	6
(Sweden) M Tillström	6	3	4
(Belgium) J Van Herck	3	6	6
(South Africa) M Ondruska	5	2
2	(France) C Pioline	7	6

Second round
6	(Slovakia) D Hrbatý	6	6
Q	(Sweden) N Kulti	3	4
Q	(France) O Delaître	4	3
4	(Switzerland) M Rosset	6	6
7	(Germany) M-K Goellner	4	4
(Germany) H Dreekmann	6	6
(Belgium) J Van Herck	3	4
2	(France) C Pioline	6	6

Quarterfinals
6	(Slovakia) D Hrbatý	4	3
4	(Switzerland) M Rosset	6	6
(Germany) H Dreekmann	6	3	5
2	(France) C Pioline	4	6	7

Semifinals
4	(Switzerland) M Rosset	6	6
2	(France) C Pioline	1	4
