= 1999 ABN AMRO World Tennis Tournament – Doubles =

Doubles
- 1999 ABN AMRO World Tennis Tournament

Final
- Champions: (South Africa) David Adams (South Africa) John-Laffnie de Jager
- Runners-up: (United Kingdom) Neil Broad (Australia) Peter Tramacchi
- Score: 6–7^{(5–7)}, 6–3, 6–4

Details
- Draw: 16 (3WC/1Q)
- Seeds: 8

Events
Singles	Doubles
- Rotterdam Open

Jacco Eltingh and Paul Haarhuis were the defending champions, but Eltingh retired from the sport on November 22, 1998, and only Haarhuis competed that year. Haarhuis partnered with Patrick Galbraith, but lost in the first round to Neil Broad and Peter Tramacchi.

David Adams and John-Laffnie de Jager won in the final 6–7^{(5–7)}, 6–3, 6–4, against Neil Broad and Peter Tramacchi.

== Seeds ==
1. (United States) Patrick Galbraith / (Netherlands) Paul Haarhuis (first round)
2. (France) Olivier Delaître / (France) Fabrice Santoro (first round)
3. (Czech Republic) Martin Damm / (Czech Republic) Cyril Suk (first round)
4. (South Africa) Piet Norval / (Zimbabwe) Kevin Ullyett (semifinals)

== Draw ==
Key

- Q = Qualifier
- WC = Wild card
- LL = Lucky loser
- Alt = Alternate
- ITF = ITF entry
- PR = Protected ranking
- SR = Special ranking
- SE = Special exempt
- JE = Junior exempt
- JR = Junior Accelerator Programme entrant
- CO = College Accelerator Programme entrant
- NG = Next Gen Accelerator Program entrant
- w/o = Walkover
- r = Retired
- d = Defaulted

=== Finals ===
First round
1	(United States) P Galbraith (Netherlands) P Haarhuis	2	6^{5}
(United Kingdom) N Broad (Australia) P Tramacchi	6	7
WC	(Netherlands) T Kempers (Netherlands) J Siemerink	6	7
WC	(Croatia) G Ivanišević (Germany) N Kiefer	4	5
4	(South Africa) P Norval (Zimbabwe) K Ullyett	7	4	7
(Spain) F Roig (Spain) J Sánchez	6^{0}	6	6^{2}
(Spain) T Carbonell (South Africa) C Haggard	6^{2}	4
Q	(South Africa) N Godwin (United States) M Keil	7	6
(South Africa) D Adams (South Africa) J-L de Jager	6	6
(Zimbabwe) W Black (Australia) S Stolle	3	1
WC	(Russia) Y Kafelnikov (Czech Republic) P Korda	7	6
4	(Czech Republic) M Damm (Czech Republic) C Suk	5	2
(Sweden) P Nyborg (Czech Republic) P Vízner	7	7
(Sweden) N Kulti (Australia) D Macpherson	6^{5}	5
(Australia) J Eagle (Australia) A Florent	6	6
2	(France) O Delaître (France) F Santoro	2	1

Quarterfinals
(United Kingdom) N Broad (Australia) P Tramacchi	6	6
WC	(Netherlands) T Kempers (Netherlands) J Siemerink	3	4
4	(South Africa) P Norval (Zimbabwe) K Ullyett	7	7
Q	(South Africa) N Godwin (United States) M Keil	6^{5}	6^{5}
(South Africa) D Adams (South Africa) J-L de Jager	4	6	7
WC	(Russia) Y Kafelnikov (Czech Republic) P Korda	6	1	6^{2}
(Sweden) P Nyborg (Czech Republic) P Vízner	6^{4}	7	4
(Australia) J Eagle (Australia) A Florent	7	5	6

Semifinals
(United Kingdom) N Broad (Australia) P Tramacchi	6	7
4	(South Africa) P Norval (Zimbabwe) K Ullyett	3	6^{7}
(South Africa) D Adams (South Africa) J-L de Jager	4	6	6
(Australia) J Eagle (Australia) A Florent	6	3	4

Final
(United Kingdom) N Broad (Australia) P Tramacchi	7	3	4
(South Africa) D Adams (South Africa) J-L de Jager	6^{5}	6	6

== Qualifying ==
=== Qualifying seeds ===
1. (Zimbabwe) Byron Black / (South Africa) Wayne Ferreira (qualifying competition)
2. (Netherlands) Sander Groen / (Belgium) Libor Pimek (first round)

=== Qualifiers ===
1. (South Africa) Neville Godwin / (United States) Mark Keil

=== Qualifying draw ===
First round
1	(Zimbabwe) Byron Black (South Africa) Wayne Ferreira	4	7	6
Alt	(Argentina) Gastón Etlis (Italy) Vincenzo Santopadre	6	6	0
(South Africa) Neville Godwin (United States) Mark Keil	6	4	7
2	(Netherlands) Sander Groen (Belgium) Libor Pimek	4	6	5

Qualifying competition
1	(Zimbabwe) Byron Black (South Africa) Wayne Ferreira	4	5
(South Africa) Neville Godwin (United States) Mark Keil	6	7
