= 2000 ABN AMRO World Tennis Tournament =

- Date: 14–20 February
- Edition: 28th
- Category: ATP International Series Gold
- Draw: 32S/16D
- Prize money: $750,000
- Surface: Hardcourt / Indoor
- Location: Rotterdam, Netherlands
- Venue: Rotterdam Ahoy

Champions

Singles
- (France) Cédric Pioline

Doubles
- (South Africa) David Adams (South Africa) John-Laffnie de Jager
- ABN AMRO World Tennis Tournament

The 2000 ABN AMRO World Tennis Tournament was a tennis tournament played on indoor hard courts. It was the 28th edition of the event known that year as the ABN AMRO World Tennis Tournament, and was part of the ATP International Series Gold of the 2000 ATP Tour. It took place at the Rotterdam Ahoy indoor sporting arena in Rotterdam, Netherlands, from 14 February through 20 February 2000.

The singles draw was led by ATP No. 2, Australian Open runner-up, Moscow titlist and Rotterdam defending champion Yevgeny Kafelnikov, Australian Open quarterfinalist, and recent Dubai winner Nicolas Kiefer, and Australian Open semifinalist, Auckland titlist Magnus Norman. Also present were Lyon and Indianapolis champion Nicolás Lapentti, Rotterdam defending finalist Tim Henman, Thomas Enqvist, Greg Rusedski and Cédric Pioline. Pioline won the singles title.

== Finals ==
=== Singles ===
(France) Cédric Pioline defeated (United Kingdom) Tim Henman, 6–7^{(3-7)}, 6–4, 7–6^{(7-4)}

- It was Cédric Pioline's 1st title of the year, and his 4th overall.

=== Doubles ===
(South Africa) David Adams / (South Africa) John-Laffnie de Jager defeated (United Kingdom) Tim Henman / (Russia) Yevgeny Kafelnikov 5–7, 6–2, 6–3
