= 1997 Australian Men's Hardcourt Championships – Doubles =

Doubles
- 1997 Australian Men's Hardcourt Championships

Final
- Champions: (Australia) Patrick Rafter (United States) Bryan Shelton
- Runners-up: (Australia) Todd Woodbridge (Australia) Mark Woodforde
- Score: 6–4, 1–6, 6–3

Events
Singles	Doubles
← 1996 ·	Australian Men's Hardcourt Championships	· 1998 →

Todd Woodbridge and Mark Woodforde were the defending champions but lost in the final 6–4, 1–6, 6–3 against Patrick Rafter and Bryan Shelton.

== Seeds ==
1. (Australia) Todd Woodbridge / (Australia) Mark Woodforde (final)
2. (Zimbabwe) Byron Black / (Canada) Grant Connell (semifinals)
3. (Russia) Yevgeny Kafelnikov / (Czech Republic) Daniel Vacek (first round)
4. (South Africa) Ellis Ferreira / (United States) Patrick Galbraith (first round)

== Draw ==
=== Key ===
- Q = Qualifier
- WC = Wild card
- LL = Lucky loser
- Alt = Alternate
- SE = Special exempt
- PR = Protected ranking
- ITF = ITF entry
- JE = Junior exempt
- w/o = Walkover
- r = Retired
- d = Defaulted
- SR = Special ranking

First round
1	(Australia) T Woodbridge (Australia) M Woodforde	5	6	6
(Czech Republic) J Novák (Czech Republic) C Suk	7	4	4
(United States) J Grabb (United States) J Tarango	6	6
(South Africa) M Ondruska (South Africa) B Talbot	4	1
3	(Russia) Y Kafelnikov (Czech Republic) D Vacek	6	7	2
Q	(United Kingdom) N Broad (South Africa) G Muller	7	5	6
(United States) A O'Brien (United States) J Stark	6	7
(South Africa) D Adams (Netherlands) M Oosting	3	6
WC	(Australia) P Rafter (United States) B Shelton	5	6	7
WC	(Australia) P Cash (Australia) S Stolle	7	3	6
WC	(Australia) J Eagle (Australia) A Florent	6	7
4	(South Africa) E Ferreira (United States) P Galbraith	3	6
(Czech Republic) M Damm (Czech Republic) P Vízner	4	7	7
(Sweden) J Björkman (Sweden) N Kulti	6	6	6
(Argentina) P Albano (Argentina) L Lobo	4	4
2	(Zimbabwe) B Black (Canada) G Connell	6	6

Quarterfinals
1	(Australia) T Woodbridge (Australia) M Woodforde	6	3	6
(United States) J Grabb (United States) J Tarango	3	6	0
Q	(United Kingdom) N Broad (South Africa) G Muller	6	6
(United States) A O'Brien (United States) J Stark	4	3
WC	(Australia) P Rafter (United States) B Shelton	6	6
WC	(Australia) J Eagle (Australia) A Florent	4	4
(Czech Republic) M Damm (Czech Republic) P Vízner	3	7	2
2	(Zimbabwe) B Black (Canada) G Connell	6	5	6

Semifinals
1	(Australia) T Woodbridge (Australia) M Woodforde	6	6
Q	(United Kingdom) N Broad (South Africa) G Muller	3	3
WC	(Australia) P Rafter (United States) B Shelton	7	7
2	(Zimbabwe) B Black (Canada) G Connell	5	6

Final
1	(Australia) T Woodbridge (Australia) M Woodforde	4	6	3
WC	(Australia) P Rafter (United States) B Shelton	6	1	6
