= 1997 Australian Men's Hardcourt Championships – Singles =

Singles
- 1997 Australian Men's Hardcourt Championships

Final
- Champion: (Australia) Todd Woodbridge
- Runner-up: (Australia) Scott Draper
- Score: 6–2, 6–1

Details
- Seeds: 8

Events
Singles	Doubles
← 1996 ·	Australian Men's Hardcourt Championships	· 1998 →

Yevgeny Kafelnikov was the defending champion but lost in the first round to Mikael Tillström.

Todd Woodbridge won in the final 6–2, 6–1 against Scott Draper.

== Seeds ==
1. (Russia) Yevgeny Kafelnikov (first round)
2. (Australia) Mark Woodforde (second round)
3. (Ukraine) Andriy Medvedev (first round)
4. (Australia) Todd Woodbridge (champion)
5. (United States) Alex O'Brien (quarterfinals)
6. (Germany) David Prinosil (second round)
7. (Italy) Renzo Furlan (first round)
8. (Czech Republic) Bohdan Ulihrach (second round)

== Draw ==
=== Key ===
- Q = Qualifier
- WC = Wild card
- LL = Lucky loser
- Alt = Alternate
- SE = Special exempt
- PR = Protected ranking
- ITF = ITF entry
- JE = Junior exempt
- w/o = Walkover
- r = Retired
- d = Defaulted
- SR = Special ranking

=== Finals ===
Semifinals
(Sweden) Mikael Tillström	7^{8}	6^{3}	3
4	(Australia) Todd Woodbridge	6^{6}	7^{7}	6
Q	(United States) Jeff Tarango	1	6	2
WC	(Australia) Scott Draper	6	3	6

Final
4	(Australia) Todd Woodbridge	6	6
WC	(Australia) Scott Draper	2	1

=== Top half ===
First round
1	(Russia) Y Kafelnikov	2	2
(Sweden) M Tillström	6	6
(Zimbabwe) B Black	6	6
(Denmark) K Carlsen	4	3
(Australia) P Rafter	6	6
Q	(United States) J Salzenstein	4	3
WC	(Russia) A Cherkasov	4	6	6
7	(Italy) R Furlan	6	4	4
4	(Australia) T Woodbridge	4	6	6
(Czech Republic) D Vacek	6	3	3
(Czech Republic) J Novák	7	1	7^{7}
WC	(Australia) M Tebbutt	5	6	6^{4}
Q	(Spain) G Blanco	4	3
(Sweden) T Johansson	6	6
(Germany) M-K Goellner	7^{7}	4	6^{9}
5	(United States) A O'Brien	6^{5}	6	7^{11}

Second round
(Sweden) M Tillström	w/o
(Zimbabwe) B Black
(Australia) P Rafter	2	6^{13}
WC	(Russia) A Cherkasov	6	7^{15}
4	(Australia) T Woodbridge	6	7^{7}
(Czech Republic) J Novák	3	6^{5}
(Sweden) T Johansson	4	6	4
5	(United States) A O'Brien	6	3	6

Quarterfinals
(Sweden) M Tillström	6	6
WC	(Russia) A Cherkasov	2	4
4	(Australia) T Woodbridge	6	6
5	(United States) A O'Brien	4	4

Semifinals
(Sweden) M Tillström	7^{8}	6^{3}	3
4	(Australia) T Woodbridge	6^{6}	7^{7}	6

=== Bottom half ===
First round
6	(Germany) D Prinosil	6	6
(Czech Republic) C Doseděl	2	3
(Czech Republic) M Damm	3	3
Q	(United States) J Tarango	6	6
(Sweden) J Björkman	7	6
(Sweden) N Kulti	5	1
(United States) J Stark	6	6
3	(Ukraine) A Medvedev	1	1
8	(Czech Republic) B Ulihrach	6	6
Q	(Venezuela) N Pereira	4	4
(Germany) A Rădulescu	3	6	3
WC	(Australia) S Draper	6	3	6
(Slovakia) K Kučera	6	4	6
(Australia) S Stolle	1	6	0
(Australia) R Fromberg	3	3
2	(Australia) M Woodforde	6	6

Second round
6	(Germany) D Prinosil	2	4
Q	(United States) J Tarango	6	6
(Sweden) J Björkman	6	6
(United States) J Stark	4	2
8	(Czech Republic) B Ulihrach	6^{1}	6	3
WC	(Australia) S Draper	7^{7}	1	6
(Slovakia) K Kučera	6	6
2	(Australia) M Woodforde	3	4

Quarterfinals
Q	(United States) J Tarango	6	6^{2}	7^{17}
(Sweden) J Björkman	1	7^{7}	6^{15}
WC	(Australia) S Draper	6	7
(Slovakia) K Kučera	4	5

Semifinals
Q	(United States) J Tarango	1	6	2
WC	(Australia) S Draper	6	3	6
