= 2000 ABN AMRO World Tennis Tournament – Singles =

Singles
- 2000 ABN AMRO World Tennis Tournament

Final
- Champion: (France) Cédric Pioline
- Runner-up: (United Kingdom) Tim Henman
- Score: 6–7^{(3–7)}, 6–4, 7–6^{(7–4)}

Details
- Draw: 32
- Seeds: 8

Events
Singles	Doubles
← 1999 ·	ABN AMRO World Tennis Tournament	· 2001 →

Yevgeny Kafelnikov was the defending champion, but lost in the semifinals to Tim Henman.

Cédric Pioline won in the final 6–7^{(3–7)}, 6–4, 7–6^{(7–4)}, against Tim Henman.

== Seeds ==
1. (Russia) Yevgeny Kafelnikov (semifinals)
2. (Germany) Nicolas Kiefer (quarterfinals)
3. (Sweden) Magnus Norman (quarterfinals)
4. (Ecuador) Nicolás Lapentti (first round)
5. (United Kingdom) Tim Henman (final)
6. (Sweden) Thomas Enqvist (first round)
7. (United Kingdom) Greg Rusedski (quarterfinals)
8. (France) Cédric Pioline (champion)

== Draw ==
=== Key ===
- Q = Qualifier
- WC = Wild card
- LL = Lucky loser
- Alt = Alternate
- SE = Special exempt
- PR = Protected ranking
- ITF = ITF entry
- JE = Junior exempt
- w/o = Walkover
- r = Retired
- d = Defaulted
- SR = Special ranking

=== Finals ===
Semifinals
1	(Russia) Yevgeny Kafelnikov	3	6	3
5	(United Kingdom) Tim Henman	6	4	6
(France) Jérôme Golmard	3	4
8	(France) Cédric Pioline	6	6

Final
5	(United Kingdom) Tim Henman	7	4	6^{4}
8	(France) Cédric Pioline	6^{3}	6	7

=== Top half ===
First round
1	(Russia) Y Kafelnikov	6	6
LL	(Sweden) N Kulti	2	2
Q	(Germany) D Prinosil	4	1
(France) N Escudé	6	6
WC	(Croatia) G Ivanišević	3	6	4
Q	(Belgium) F Dewulf	6	2	6
(Slovakia) K Kučera	2	5
7	(United Kingdom) G Rusedski	6	7
4	(Ecuador) N Lapentti	6^{5}	2
Q	(Sweden) J Björkman	7	6
(Slovakia) D Hrbatý	4	6	7
(Russia) M Safin	6	1	6^{7}
(Morocco) K Alami	5	4
(France) F Santoro	7	6
(Spain) A Martín	2	2
5	(United Kingdom) T Henman	6	6

Second round
1	(Russia) Y Kafelnikov	6	6
(France) N Escudé	3	3
Q	(Belgium) F Dewulf	6^{3}	4
7	(United Kingdom) G Rusedski	7	6
Q	(Sweden) J Björkman	6^{3}	3
(Slovakia) D Hrbatý	7	6
(France) F Santoro	2	5
5	(United Kingdom) T Henman	6	7

Quarterfinals
1	(Russia) Y Kafelnikov	6^{3}	6	6
7	(United Kingdom) G Rusedski	7	4	4
(Slovakia) D Hrbatý	6^{3}	2
5	(United Kingdom) T Henman	7	6

Semifinals
1	(Russia) Y Kafelnikov	3	6	3
5	(United Kingdom) T Henman	6	4	6

=== Bottom half ===
First round
6	(Sweden) T Enqvist	3	6^{5}
WC	(Netherlands) J Siemerink	6	7
(France) J Golmard	6	6
(Argentina) M Zabaleta	2	3
(Romania) A Pavel	4	7	4
WC	(Netherlands) P Wessels	6	6^{3}	6
(Netherlands) S Schalken	3	7	3
3	(Sweden) M Norman	6	6^{4}	6
8	(France) C Pioline	6	6
Q	(Romania) A Voinea	2	3
(France) S Grosjean	7	6
(Ukraine) A Medvedev	5	3
(Czech Republic) J Novák	4	6	6
(Sweden) T Johansson	6	3	2
(Czech Republic) D Vacek	2	4
2	(Germany) N Kiefer	6	6

Second round
WC	(Netherlands) J Siemerink	4	6^{4}
(France) J Golmard	6	7
WC	(Netherlands) P Wessels	4	3
3	(Sweden) M Norman	6	6
8	(France) C Pioline	7	6^{3}	6
(France) S Grosjean	6^{5}	7	3
(Czech Republic) J Novák	7	2	6^{3}
2	(Germany) N Kiefer	5	6	7

Quarterfinals
(France) J Golmard	6	6
3	(Sweden) M Norman	4	3
8	(France) C Pioline	2	6	7
2	(Germany) N Kiefer	6	3	5

Semifinals
(France) J Golmard	3	4
8	(France) C Pioline	6	6
