= 1996 Australian Men's Hardcourt Championships – Doubles =

Doubles
- 1996 Australian Men's Hardcourt Championships

Final
- Champions: (Australia) Todd Woodbridge (Australia) Mark Woodforde
- Runners-up: (Sweden) Jonas Björkman (United States) Tommy Ho
- Score: 7–5, 7–6

Details
- Draw: 16
- Seeds: 4

Events
Singles	Doubles
← 1995 ·	Australian Men's Hardcourt Championships	· 1997 →

Jim Courier and Patrick Rafter were the defending champions but did not compete that year.

Todd Woodbridge and Mark Woodforde won in the final 7–5, 7–6 against Jonas Björkman and Tommy Ho.

== Seeds ==
1. (Australia) Todd Woodbridge / (Australia) Mark Woodforde (champions)
2. (Czech Republic) Cyril Suk / (Czech Republic) Daniel Vacek (quarterfinals)
3. (Zimbabwe) Byron Black / (Canada) Grant Connell (semifinals)
4. (Sweden) Jonas Björkman / (United States) Tommy Ho (final)

== Draw ==
=== Key ===
- Q = Qualifier
- WC = Wild card
- LL = Lucky loser
- Alt = Alternate
- SE = Special exempt
- PR = Protected ranking
- ITF = ITF entry
- JE = Junior exempt
- w/o = Walkover
- r = Retired
- d = Defaulted
- SR = Special ranking

First round
1	(Australia) T Woodbridge (Australia) M Woodforde	6	6
(Argentina) J Frana (Argentina) L Lobo	2	2
WC	(Australia) S Stolle (Australia) M Tebbutt	6	4	6
(France) G Forget (Switzerland) J Hlasek	4	6	3
3	(Zimbabwe) B Black (Canada) G Connell	6	5	6
WC	(Australia) W Arthurs (Australia) A Kratzmann	2	7	2
Q	(Zimbabwe) W Black (United Kingdom) G Rusedski	6	6
(United States) L Jensen (United States) M Jensen	4	2
(United States) T Kronemann (United States) M Lucena	2	2
(South Africa) D Adams (Russia) Y Kafelnikov	6	6
WC	(Australia) S Draper (Australia) J Stoltenberg	0	3
4	(Sweden) J Björkman (United States) T Ho	6	6
(Canada) S Lareau (United States) A O'Brien	6	6
(Czech Republic) J Novák (Czech Republic) D Rikl	2	3
(Czech Republic) M Damm (South Africa) E Ferreira	6	4
2	(Czech Republic) C Suk (Czech Republic) D Vacek	7	6

Quarterfinals
1	(Australia) T Woodbridge (Australia) M Woodforde	7	6
WC	(Australia) S Stolle (Australia) M Tebbutt	6	2
3	(Zimbabwe) B Black (Canada) G Connell	5	6	6
Q	(Zimbabwe) W Black (United Kingdom) G Rusedski	7	3	1
(South Africa) D Adams (Russia) Y Kafelnikov	2	4
4	(Sweden) J Björkman (United States) T Ho	6	6
(Canada) S Lareau (United States) A O'Brien	7	6
2	(Czech Republic) C Suk (Czech Republic) D Vacek	6	1

Semifinals
1	(Australia) T Woodbridge (Australia) M Woodforde	6	6
3	(Zimbabwe) B Black (Canada) G Connell	2	0
4	(Sweden) J Björkman (United States) T Ho	7	4	6
(Canada) S Lareau (United States) A O'Brien	5	6	3

Final
1	(Australia) T Woodbridge (Australia) M Woodforde	7	7
4	(Sweden) J Björkman (United States) T Ho	5	6
