= 1996 Australian Men's Hardcourt Championships =

- Date: 1–7 January
- Edition: 19th
- Category: World Series
- Draw: 32S / 16D
- Prize money: $303,000
- Location: Adelaide, Australia
- Venue: Memorial Drive Park

Champions

Singles
- (Russia) Yevgeny Kafelnikov

Doubles
- (Australia) Todd Woodbridge / (Australia) Mark Woodforde
- Australian Hard Court Championships

The 1996 Australian Men's Hardcourt Championships was a men's tennis tournament played on outdoor hard courts at the Memorial Drive Park in Adelaide, Australia and was part of the World Series of the 1996 ATP Tour. The tournament ran from 1 January through 7 January 1996. First-seeded Yevgeny Kafelnikov won the singles title.

== Finals ==
=== Singles ===
(Russia) Yevgeny Kafelnikov defeated (Zimbabwe) Byron Black 7–6^{(7–0)}, 3–6, 6–1

- It was Kafelnikov's 1st title of the year and the 16th of his career.

=== Doubles ===
(Australia) Todd Woodbridge / (Australia) Mark Woodforde defeated (Sweden) Jonas Björkman / (United States) Tommy Ho 7–5, 7–6

- It was Woodbridge's 1st title of the year and the 36th of his career. It was Woodforde's 1st title of the year and the 44th of his career.
