= 1995 St. Petersburg Open =

Tennis tournament

- Date: 13–20 March
- Edition: 1st
- Category: World Series
- Draw: 32S / 16D
- Prize money: $300,000
- Surface: Carpet / indoor
- Location: St. Petersburg, Russia
- Venue: Petersburg Sports and Concert Complex

Champions

Singles
- (Russia) Yevgeny Kafelnikov

Doubles
- (Czech Republic) Martin Damm / (Sweden) Anders Järryd
St. Petersburg Open	· 1996 →

The 1995 St. Petersburg Open was a men's tennis tournament played on indoor carpet courts in St. Petersburg, Russia at the Petersburg Sports and Concert Complex. It was the inaugural edition of the St. Petersburg Open, and was part of the World Series of the 1995 ATP Tour. The tournament was held from 13 March until 20 March 1995. It was the first time that three Russian players reached the semifinals of an ATP tournament. Yevgeny Kafelnikov won the singles title.

== Finals ==
=== Singles ===
(Russia) Yevgeny Kafelnikov defeated (France) Guillaume Raoux, 6–2, 6–2

- It was Kafelnikov's 2nd title of the year and 5th of his career.

=== Doubles ===
(Czech Republic) Martin Damm / (Sweden) Anders Järryd defeated (Switzerland) Jakob Hlasek / (Russia) Yevgeny Kafelnikov, 6–4, 6–2

- It was Damm's 2nd title of the year and 71st title overall. It was Järryd's 2nd title of the year and 59th title overall.
