= 1996 St. Petersburg Open – Singles =

Singles
- 1996 St. Petersburg Open

Final
- Champion: (Sweden) Magnus Gustafsson
- Runner-up: (Russia) Yevgeny Kafelnikov
- Score: 6–2, 7–6^{(7–4)}

Details
- Draw: 32 (4 Q / 23 WC )
- Seeds: 8

Events
Singles	Doubles
← 1995 ·	St. Petersburg Open	· 1997 →

Yevgeny Kafelnikov was the defending champion but lost in the final 6–2, 7–6^{(7–4)} against Magnus Gustafsson.

== Seeds ==
1. (Russia) Yevgeny Kafelnikov (final)
2. (Czech Republic) Daniel Vacek (quarterfinals)
3. (Germany) David Prinosil (quarterfinals)
4. (Belgium) Filip Dewulf (semifinals)
5. (Sweden) Mikael Tillström (quarterfinals)
6. (Denmark) Kenneth Carlsen (second round)
7. (Sweden) Magnus Gustafsson (champion)
8. (Germany) Carl-Uwe Steeb (first round)

== Draw ==
=== Key ===
- Q = Qualifier
- WC = Wild card
- LL = Lucky loser
- Alt = Alternate
- SE = Special exempt
- PR = Protected ranking
- ITF = ITF entry
- JE = Junior exempt
- w/o = Walkover
- r = Retired
- d = Defaulted
- SR = Special ranking

=== Finals ===
Semifinals
1	(Russia) Yevgeny Kafelnikov	6	6
4	(Belgium) Filip Dewulf	3	4
LL	(Germany) Lars Burgsmüller	5	5
7	(Sweden) Magnus Gustafsson	7	7

Final
1	(Russia) Yevgeny Kafelnikov	2	6^{4}
7	(Sweden) Magnus Gustafsson	6	7^{7}

=== Top half ===
First round
1	(Russia) Y Kafelnikov	6	6
Q	(Italy) O Camporese	3	3
(Belgium) D Norman	6	6
WC	(Russia) A Cherkasov	1	4
WC	(Russia) A Tchernenko	6^{1}	2
Q	(Germany) N Kiefer	7^{7}	6
(United States) J Tarango	6^{7}	6	6
8	(Germany) C-U Steeb	7^{9}	2	1
4	(Belgium) F Dewulf	6	4	6
(Uzbekistan) O Ogorodov	3	6	1
(Portugal) N Marques	6	7^{7}
(France) O Delaître	4	6^{4}
(Sweden) T Johansson	6^{5}	6	6
(Russia) A Olhovskiy	7^{7}	3	3
(Russia) A Volkov	2	5
5	(Sweden) M Tillström	6	7

Second round
1	(Russia) Y Kafelnikov	4	6	6
(Belgium) D Norman	6	3	4
Q	(Germany) N Kiefer	6	3	6^{7}
(United States) J Tarango	3	6	7^{9}
4	(Belgium) F Dewulf	6	6
(Portugal) N Marques	4	3
(Sweden) T Johansson	4	6	6^{4}
5	(Sweden) M Tillström	6	4	7^{7}

Quarterfinals
1	(Russia) Y Kafelnikov	7	6
(United States) J Tarango	5	3
4	(Belgium) F Dewulf	6	4	6
5	(Sweden) M Tillström	4	6	4

Semifinals
1	(Russia) Y Kafelnikov	6	6
4	(Belgium) F Dewulf	3	4

=== Bottom half ===
First round
6	(Denmark) K Carlsen	7^{7}	7
Q	(Belarus) A Shvets	6^{4}	5
LL	(Germany) L Burgsmüller	6	6
(Hungary) S Noszály	4	4
(Sweden) J Apell	4	6	6
Q	(Sweden) N Kulti	6	2	4
(Denmark) F Fetterlein	1	2
3	(Germany) D Prinosil	6	6
7	(Sweden) M Gustafsson	6	6
(France) L Roux	2	4
(Sweden) H Holm	3	2
(Sweden) A Järryd	6	6
(France) J Golmard	4	6	6
(Belgium) J van Herck	6	3	4
(Russia) A Chesnokov	6	1	4
2	(Czech Republic) D Vacek	4	6	6

Second round
6	(Denmark) K Carlsen	3	7^{7}	5
LL	(Germany) L Burgsmüller	6	6^{2}	7
(Sweden) J Apell	4	4
3	(Germany) D Prinosil	6	6
7	(Sweden) M Gustafsson	6	6
(Sweden) A Järryd	2	2
(France) J Golmard	2	1
2	(Czech Republic) D Vacek	6	6

Quarterfinals
LL	(Germany) L Burgsmüller	3	6	6
3	(Germany) D Prinosil	6	4	4
7	(Sweden) M Gustafsson	2
2	(Czech Republic) D Vacek	1^{r}

Semifinals
LL	(Germany) L Burgsmüller	5	5
7	(Sweden) M Gustafsson	7	7
