= 1997 St. Petersburg Open – Singles =

Singles
- 1997 St. Petersburg Open

Final
- Champion: (Sweden) Thomas Johansson
- Runner-up: (Italy) Renzo Furlan
- Score: 6–3, 6–4

Details
- Draw: 32 (4 Q / 3 WC )
- Seeds: 8

Events
Singles	Doubles
← 1996 ·	St. Petersburg Open	· 1998 →

Magnus Gustafsson was the defending champion but did not compete that year.

Thomas Johansson won in the final 6–3, 6–4 against Renzo Furlan.

== Seeds ==
1. (Germany) Michael Stich (semifinals)
2. (United Kingdom) Greg Rusedski (second round, withdrew)
3. (Germany) David Prinosil (second round)
4. (Czech Republic) Daniel Vacek (second round)
5. (Sweden) Thomas Johansson (champion)
6. (Slovakia) Karol Kučera (first round)
7. (Italy) Renzo Furlan (final)
8. (Denmark) Kenneth Carlsen (quarterfinals)

== Draw ==
=== Key ===
- Q = Qualifier
- WC = Wild card
- LL = Lucky loser
- Alt = Alternate
- SE = Special exempt
- PR = Protected ranking
- ITF = ITF entry
- JE = Junior exempt
- w/o = Walkover
- r = Retired
- d = Defaulted
- SR = Special ranking

=== Finals ===
Semifinals
1	(Germany) Michael Stich	3	1
5	(Sweden) Thomas Johansson	6	6
(Slovakia) Ján Krošlák	3	3
7	(Italy) Renzo Furlan	6	6

Final
5	(Sweden) Thomas Johansson	6	6
7	(Italy) Renzo Furlan	3	4

=== Top half ===
First round
1	(Germany) M Stich	4	7	7^{9}
(Australia) R Fromberg	6	5	6^{7}
(Spain) E Benfele Álvarez	7^{7}	7^{7}
(Italy) O Camporese	6^{3}	6^{1}
WC	(Russia) A Belov	4	2
(Portugal) N Marques	6	6
(Spain) F Roig	4	4
8	(Denmark) K Carlsen	6	6
4	(Czech Republic) D Vacek	6	3	6
(Sweden) P Fredriksson	4	6	2
Q	(France) O Delaître	6	6
(Russia) A Cherkasov	4	4
WC	(Russia) I Tchelychev	4	2
(France) S Simian	6	6
(Russia) A Volkov	4	1
5	(Sweden) T Johansson	6	6

Second round
1	(Germany) M Stich	6	6
(Spain) E Benfele Álvarez	4	4
(Portugal) N Marques	4	4
8	(Denmark) K Carlsen	6	6
4	(Czech Republic) D Vacek	3	6^{1}
Q	(France) O Delaître	6	7^{7}
(France) S Simian	6	3	2
5	(Sweden) T Johansson	3	6	6

Quarterfinals
1	(Germany) M Stich	6	6
8	(Denmark) K Carlsen	2	4
Q	(France) O Delaître	2	4
5	(Sweden) T Johansson	6	6

Semifinals
1	(Germany) M Stich	3	1
5	(Sweden) T Johansson	6	6

=== Bottom half ===
First round
6	(Slovakia) K Kučera	4	3
(France) F Santoro	6	6
WC	(Russia) A Stoliarov	2	4
(Slovakia) J Krošlák	6	6
Q	(Netherlands) J Winnink	5	4
(Sweden) M Norman	7	6
Q	(Germany) L Rehmann	2	2
3	(Germany) D Prinosil	6	6
7	(Italy) R Furlan	7^{7}	7^{7}
(Germany) L Burgsmüller	6^{2}	6^{3}
(Italy) G Pozzi	3	4
(Bulgaria) O Stanoytchev	6	6
(Russia) A Olhovskiy	5	1^{r}
Q	(France) A Clément	7	4
(Egypt) T El-Sawy	6	1	4
2	(United Kingdom) G Rusedski	4	6	6

Second round
(France) F Santoro	6	4	3
(Slovakia) J Krošlák	3	6	6
(Sweden) M Norman	1	6	6
3	(Germany) D Prinosil	6	4	3
7	(Italy) R Furlan	7	6
(Bulgaria) O Stanoytchev	5	3
Q	(France) A Clément	w/o
2	(United Kingdom) G Rusedski

Quarterfinals
(Slovakia) J Krošlák	6	2	7
(Sweden) M Norman	3	6	5
7	(Italy) R Furlan	5	6	6
Q	(France) A Clément	7	4	2

Semifinals
(Slovakia) J Krošlák	3	3
7	(Italy) R Furlan	6	6
