= 1996 St. Petersburg Open =

- Date: 18–24 March
- Edition: 2nd
- Category: World Series
- Draw: 32S / 16D
- Prize money: $300,000
- Surface: Carpet / indoor
- Location: St. Petersburg, Russia
- Venue: Petersburg Sports and Concert Complex

Champions

Singles
- (Sweden) Magnus Gustafsson

Doubles
- (Russia) Yevgeny Kafelnikov / (Russia) Andrei Olhovskiy
← 1995 ·	St. Petersburg Open	· 1997 →

The 1996 St. Petersburg Open was a men's tennis tournament played on indoor carpet courts at the Petersburg Sports and Concert Complex in Saint Petersburg, Russia and was part of the World Series of the 1996 ATP Tour. The tournament was held from 18 March through 24 March 1996. Seventh-seeded Magnus Gustafsson won the singles title.

== Finals ==
=== Singles ===
(Sweden) Magnus Gustafsson defeated (Russia) Yevgeny Kafelnikov 6–2, 7–6^{(7–4)}

- It was Gustafsson's 1st singles title of the year and the 8th of his career.

=== Doubles ===
(Russia) Yevgeny Kafelnikov / (Russia) Andrei Olhovskiy defeated (Sweden) Nicklas Kulti / (Sweden) Peter Nyborg 6–3, 6–4

- It was Kafelnikov's 1st title of the year and the 9th of his career. It was Olhovskiy's 1st title of the year and the 10th of his career.
