= 1995 St. Petersburg Open – Singles =

Singles
- 1995 St. Petersburg Open

Final
- Champion: (Russia) Yevgeny Kafelnikov
- Runner-up: (France) Guillaume Raoux
- Score: 6–2, 6–2

Details
- Draw: 32 (4 Q / 3 WC )
- Seeds: 8

Events
| Singles | Doubles |
| St. Petersburg Open | · 1996 → |

Yevgeny Kafelnikov won in the final 6–2, 6–2 against Guillaume Raoux.

== Seeds ==
1. (Russia) Yevgeny Kafelnikov (champions)
2. (Austria) Thomas Muster (first round)
3. (Czech Republic) Ctislav Doseděl (first round)
4. (Russia) Andrei Chesnokov (semifinals)
5. (Russia) Alexander Volkov (semifinals)
6. (Czech Republic) Martin Damm (first round)
7. (Spain) Tomás Carbonell (first round)
8. (United Kingdom) Jeremy Bates (first round)

== Draw ==
=== Key ===
- Q = Qualifier
- WC = Wild card
- LL = Lucky loser
- Alt = Alternate
- ITF = ITF entry
- PR = Protected ranking
- SR = Special ranking
- SE = Special exempt
- JE = Junior exempt
- JR = Junior Accelerator Programme entrant
- CO = College Accelerator Programme entrant
- NG = Next Gen Accelerator Program entrant
- w/o = Walkover
- r = Retired
- d = Defaulted

=== Finals ===
Semifinals
1 | (Russia) Yevgeny Kafelnikov | 6 | 6
5 | (Russia) Alexander Volkov | 3 | 2
4 | (Russia) Andrei Chesnokov | 6 | 3 | 4
(France) Guillaume Raoux | 4 | 6 | 6

Final
1 | (Russia) Yevgeny Kafelnikov | 6 | 6
(France) Guillaume Raoux | 2 | 2

=== Top half ===
First round
1 | (Russia) Y Kafelnikov | 6 | 6
Q | (United Kingdom) D Sapsford | 0 | 3
(Italy) C Caratti | 2 | 6 | 3
(Sweden) A Järryd | 6 | 4 | 6
WC | (Latvia) Ģ Dzelde | 6 | 6
Q | (Switzerland) L Manta | 2 | 3
(Switzerland) J Hlasek | 7^{7} | 3 | 6
7 | (Spain) T Carbonell | 6^{4} | 6 | 1
3 | (Czech Republic) C Doseděl | 2 | 4
(Canada) S Lareau | 6 | 6
(France) R Gilbert | 5 | 1
(Austria) A Antonitsch | 7 | 6
(Denmark) K Carlsen | 6 | 6
(Germany) J Renzenbrink | 3 | 3
Q | (Romania) R Sabău | 2 | 4
5 | (Russia) A Volkov | 6 | 6

Second round
1 | (Russia) Y Kafelnikov | 6 | 7
(Sweden) A Järryd | 1 | 5
WC | (Latvia) Ģ Dzelde | 2 | 3
(Switzerland) J Hlasek | 6 | 6
(Canada) S Lareau | 2 | 6 | 7
(Austria) A Antonitsch | 6 | 4 | 5
(Denmark) K Carlsen | 2 | 4
5 | (Russia) A Volkov | 6 | 6

Quarterfinals
1 | (Russia) Y Kafelnikov | 6 | 2 | 6
(Switzerland) J Hlasek | 2 | 6 | 2
(Canada) S Lareau | 2 | 3
5 | (Russia) A Volkov | 6 | 6

Semifinals
1 | (Russia) Y Kafelnikov | 6 | 6
5 | (Russia) A Volkov | 3 | 2

=== Bottom half ===
First round
6 | (Czech Republic) M Damm | 4 | 5
(France) T Guardiola | 6 | 7
WC | (Germany) N Kiefer | 6 | 6
(Germany) M Sinner | 1 | 2
(Germany) A Thoms | 6 | 3 | 6
(Kenya) P Wekesa | 4 | 6 | 4
(Germany) D Prinosil | 6 | 6^{4} | 6^{3}
4 | (Russia) A Chesnokov | 4 | 7^{7} | 7^{7}
8 | (United Kingdom) J Bates | 3 | 5
WC | (Australia) P Cash | 6 | 7
(Germany) A Mronz | 3 | 3
(France) G Raoux | 6 | 6
LL | (Russia) A Cherkasov | 6 | 3 | 6
(Canada) G Rusedski | 4 | 6 | 2
Q | (United States) T.J. Middleton | 7 | 6
2 | (Austria) T Muster | 5 | 3

Second round
(France) T Guardiola | 5 | 4
WC | (Germany) N Kiefer | 7 | 6
(Germany) A Thoms | 2 | 3
4 | (Russia) A Chesnokov | 6 | 6
WC | (Australia) P Cash | 6^{4} | 3
(France) G Raoux | 7^{7} | 6
LL | (Russia) A Cherkasov | 6 | 6^{7} | 4
Q | (United States) T.J. Middleton | 4 | 7^{9} | 6

Quarterfinals
WC | (Germany) N Kiefer | 4 | 2
4 | (Russia) A Chesnokov | 6 | 6
(France) G Raoux | 6 | 6
Q | (United States) T.J. Middleton | 1 | 2

Semifinals
4 | (Russia) A Chesnokov | 6 | 3 | 4
(France) G Raoux | 4 | 6 | 6
