= 1996 Australian Men's Hardcourt Championships – Singles =

Singles
- 1996 Australian Men's Hardcourt Championships

Final
- Champion: (Russia) Yevgeny Kafelnikov
- Runner-up: (Zimbabwe) Byron Black
- Score: 7–6^{(7–0)}, 3–6, 6–1

Details
- Draw: 32
- Seeds: 8

Events
Singles	Doubles
← 1995 ·	Australian Men's Hardcourt Championships	· 1997 →

Jim Courier was the defending champion but did not compete that year.

Yevgeny Kafelnikov won in the final 7–6^{(7–0)}, 3–6, 6–1 against Byron Black.

== Seeds ==
1. (Russia) Yevgeny Kafelnikov (champion)
2. (Czech Republic) Daniel Vacek (quarterfinals)
3. (Italy) Renzo Furlan (quarterfinals)
4. (Sweden) Jonas Björkman (first round)
5. (Australia) Todd Woodbridge (first round)
6. (Switzerland) Jakob Hlasek (first round)
7. (United Kingdom) Greg Rusedski (quarterfinals)
8. (Zimbabwe) Byron Black (final)

== Draw ==
=== Key ===
- Q = Qualifier
- WC = Wild card
- LL = Lucky loser
- Alt = Alternate
- SE = Special exempt
- PR = Protected ranking
- ITF = ITF entry
- JE = Junior exempt
- w/o = Walkover
- r = Retired
- d = Defaulted
- SR = Special ranking

=== Finals ===
Semifinals
1	(Russia) Yevgeny Kafelnikov	7	6
(Argentina) Javier Frana	5	1
(Czech Republic) Martin Damm	5	3
8	(Zimbabwe) Byron Black	7	6

Final
1	(Russia) Yevgeny Kafelnikov	7^{7}	3	6
8	(Zimbabwe) Byron Black	6^{0}	6	1

=== Top half ===
First round
1	(Russia) Y Kafelnikov	6	7^{8}
Q	(Canada) S Lareau	2	6^{6}
WC	(Russia) A Cherkasov	3	7	2
(Australia) M Woodforde	6	5	6
(Australia) S Draper	4	7	6
(United States) C Adams	6	5	3
(France) G Forget	7^{7}	6^{6}	6^{5}
7	(United Kingdom) G Rusedski	6^{1}	7^{8}	7^{7}
3	(Italy) R Furlan	6	6^{5}	6
(Japan) S Matsuoka	4	7^{7}	3
(Australia) J Stoltenberg	1	4
(Slovakia) K Kučera	6	6
WC	(Australia) R Fromberg	6	1	6^{4}
(Germany) C-U Steeb	3	6	7^{7}
(Argentina) J Frana	7^{15}	6^{1}	6
5	(Australia) T Woodbridge	6^{13}	7^{7}	3

Second round
1	(Russia) Y Kafelnikov	6	4	6
(Australia) M Woodforde	4	6	1
(Australia) S Draper	3	2
7	(United Kingdom) G Rusedski	6	6
3	(Italy) R Furlan	6	6
(Slovakia) K Kučera	3	2
(Germany) C-U Steeb	4	6	1
(Argentina) J Frana	6	3	6

Quarterfinals
1	(Russia) Y Kafelnikov	6	6
7	(United Kingdom) G Rusedski	3	3
3	(Italy) R Furlan	6^{5}	3
(Argentina) J Frana	7^{7}	6

Semifinals
1	(Russia) Y Kafelnikov	7	6
(Argentina) J Frana	5	1

=== Bottom half ===
First round
6	(Switzerland) J Hlasek	7^{12}	3	6^{4}
(Sweden) H Holm	6^{10}	6	7^{7}
(Slovakia) J Krošlák	5	1^{r}
Q	(Germany) J Renzenbrink	7	3
(Denmark) K Carlsen	4	3
(Czech Republic) M Damm	6	6
Q	(Germany) N Kiefer	6	6
4	(Sweden) J Björkman	2	1
8	(Zimbabwe) B Black	6	7
(Argentina) H Gumy	1	5
(Australia) P Rafter	4	4
(Czech Republic) J Novák	6	6
(Czech Republic) D Rikl	3	6	1
Q	(Sweden) T Johansson	6	3	6
(Italy) S Pescosolido	6	4	6^{4}
2	(Czech Republic) D Vacek	4	6	7^{7}

Second round
(Sweden) H Holm	7	7^{7}
Q	(Germany) J Renzenbrink	5	6^{3}
(Czech Republic) M Damm	6	6
Q	(Germany) N Kiefer	3	4
8	(Zimbabwe) B Black	6	3	6
(Czech Republic) J Novák	1	6	2
Q	(Sweden) T Johansson	6	3	3
2	(Czech Republic) D Vacek	2	6	6

Quarterfinals
(Sweden) H Holm	3	r
(Czech Republic) M Damm	6
8	(Zimbabwe) B Black	7^{9}	6^{5}	6
2	(Czech Republic) D Vacek	6^{7}	7^{7}	4

Semifinals
(Czech Republic) M Damm	5	3
8	(Zimbabwe) B Black	7	6
