= 1995 St. Petersburg Open – Doubles =

Doubles
- 1995 St. Petersburg Open

Final
- Champions: (Czech Republic) Martin Damm (Sweden) Anders Järryd
- Runners-up: (Switzerland) Jakob Hlasek (Russia) Yevgeny Kafelnikov
- Score: 6–4, 6–2

Details
- Draw: 16
- Seeds: 4

Events
Singles	Doubles
St. Petersburg Open	· 1996 →

This was the first edition of the event.

Martin Damm and Anders Järryd won the title, defeating Jakob Hlasek and Yevgeny Kafelnikov 6–4, 6–2 in the final.

== Seeds ==
1. (Czech Republic) Martin Damm / (Sweden) Anders Järryd (champions)
2. (Switzerland) Jakob Hlasek / (Russia) Yevgeny Kafelnikov (final)
3. (Netherlands) Hendrik Jan Davids / (Canada) Sébastien Lareau (first round)
4. (United States) Mark Keil / (Sweden) Peter Nyborg (first round)

== Draw ==
=== Key ===
- Q = Qualifier
- WC = Wild card
- LL = Lucky loser
- Alt = Alternate
- SE = Special exempt
- PR = Protected ranking
- ITF = ITF entry
- JE = Junior exempt
- w/o = Walkover
- r = Retired
- d = Defaulted
- SR = Special ranking

=== Draw ===
First round
1	(Czech Republic) M Damm (Sweden) A Järryd	6	6
(Czech Republic) T Anzari (Czech Republic) J Kodeš Jr.	3	1
WC	(Austria) A Antonitsch (Austria) T Muster	3	6
(United States) TJ Middleton (Germany) A Mronz	6	7
3	(Netherlands) HJ Davids (Canada) S Lareau	3	4
(Australia) J Ireland (Belgium) L Pimek	6	6
(Czech Republic) V Flégl (Kenya) P Wekesa	6	6
(Australia) W Arthurs (United Kingdom) D Sapsford	1	3
WC	(Russia) A Chesnokov (Russia) A Merinov	2	5
WC	(Australia) P Cash (Russia) A Volkov	6	7
Q	(Czech Republic) T Krupa (Czech Republic) P Vízner	6	7
4	(United States) M Keil (Sweden) P Nyborg	4	6
(Germany) D Prinosil (Germany) M Sinner	6	7
(South Africa) M Barnard (United States) B Garnett	3	5
(France) R Gilbert (France) G Raoux	1	6
2	(Switzerland) J Hlasek (Russia) Y Kafelnikov	6	7

Quarterfinals
1	(Czech Republic) M Damm (Sweden) A Järryd	6	6
(United States) TJ Middleton (Germany) A Mronz	3	2
(Australia) J Ireland (Belgium) L Pimek	5	4
(Czech Republic) V Flégl (Kenya) P Wekesa	7	6
WC	(Australia) P Cash (Russia) A Volkov	w/o
Q	(Czech Republic) T Krupa (Czech Republic) P Vízner
(Germany) D Prinosil (Germany) M Sinner	4	1
2	(Switzerland) J Hlasek (Russia) Y Kafelnikov	6	6

Semifinals
1	(Czech Republic) M Damm (Sweden) A Järryd	6	6
(Czech Republic) V Flégl (Kenya) P Wekesa	3	2
WC	(Australia) P Cash (Russia) A Volkov	6	6	4
2	(Switzerland) J Hlasek (Russia) Y Kafelnikov	7	3	6

Final
1	(Czech Republic) M Damm (Sweden) A Järryd	6	6
2	(Switzerland) J Hlasek (Russia) Y Kafelnikov	4	2
