= 1997 St. Petersburg Open – Doubles =

Doubles
- 1997 St. Petersburg Open

Final
- Champions: (Russia) Andrei Olhovskiy (New Zealand) Brett Steven
- Runners-up: (Germany) David Prinosil (Czech Republic) Daniel Vacek
- Score: 6–4, 6–3

Details
- Draw: 16
- Seeds: 4

Events
Singles	Doubles
- St. Petersburg Open

Yevgeny Kafelnikov and Andrei Olhovskiy were the defending champions but only Olhovskiy competed that year with Brett Steven.

Olhovskiy and Steven won in the final 6–4, 6–3 against David Prinosil and Daniel Vacek.

== Seeds ==
1. (South Africa) David Adams / (South Africa) Marius Barnard (semifinals)
2. (Germany) David Prinosil / (Czech Republic) Daniel Vacek (final)
3. (France) Olivier Delaître / (France) Fabrice Santoro (semifinals)
4. (Belarus) Max Mirnyi / (South Africa) Kevin Ullyett (first round)

== Draw ==
Key

- Q = Qualifier
- WC = Wild card
- LL = Lucky loser
- Alt = Alternate
- ITF = ITF entry
- PR = Protected ranking
- SR = Special ranking
- SE = Special exempt
- JE = Junior exempt
- JR = Junior Accelerator Programme entrant
- CO = College Accelerator Programme entrant
- NG = Next Gen Accelerator Program entrant
- w/o = Walkover
- r = Retired
- d = Defaulted

First round
1	(South Africa) D Adams (South Africa) M Barnard	6	6
(Italy) O Camporese (Italy) D Nargiso	3	0
(Germany) K Braasch (Germany) M Huning	1	6	7
(Canada) S Leblanc (United States) G Van Emburgh	6	4	6
4	(Belarus) M Mirnyi (South Africa) K Ullyett	4	6
(North Macedonia) A Kitinov (Hungary) G Köves	6	7
(Russia) A Olhovskiy (New Zealand) B Steven	6	6
(Germany) P Baur (Netherlands) J Winnink	4	3
Q	(Russia) A Stoliarov (Russia) I Tchelychev	6	4	3
(Federal Republic of Yugoslavia) N Djordjevic (Portugal) N Marques	4	6	6
WC	(Germany) M Commandeur (Russia) A Volkov	2	3
3	(France) O Delaître (France) F Santoro	6	6
(Sweden) P Fredriksson (Sweden) M Norman	6	6
WC	(Russia) A Cherkasov (Russia) A Merinov	4	4
WC	(Germany) L Rehmann (Germany) M Stich	6	5
2	(Germany) D Prinosil (Czech Republic) D Vacek	7	7

Quarterfinals
1	(South Africa) D Adams (South Africa) M Barnard	7	7
(Germany) K Braasch (Germany) M Huning	6	5
(North Macedonia) A Kitinov (Hungary) G Köves	7	3	2
(Russia) A Olhovskiy (New Zealand) B Steven	6	6	6
(Federal Republic of Yugoslavia) N Djordjevic (Portugal) N Marques	5	5
3	(France) O Delaître (France) F Santoro	7	7
(Sweden) P Fredriksson (Sweden) M Norman	1	4
2	(Germany) D Prinosil (Czech Republic) D Vacek	6	6

Semifinals
1	(South Africa) D Adams (South Africa) M Barnard	3	6	6
(Russia) A Olhovskiy (New Zealand) B Steven	6	3	7
3	(France) O Delaître (France) F Santoro	3	6	3
2	(Germany) D Prinosil (Czech Republic) D Vaceko	6	3	6

Final
(Russia) A Olhovskiy (New Zealand) B Steven	6	6
2	(Germany) D Prinosil (Czech Republic) D Vacek	4	3
