= 1997 Australian Men's Hardcourt Championships =

- Date: 30 December 1996 – 5 January
- Edition: 20th
- Category: World Series
- Surface: Hard / Outdoor
- Location: Adelaide, Australia
- Venue: Memorial Drive Park

Champions

Singles
- (Australia) Todd Woodbridge

Doubles
- (Australia) Patrick Rafter / (United States) Bryan Shelton
- Australian Hard Court Championships

The 1997 Australian Men's Hardcourt Championships was a tennis tournament played on outdoor hard courts at the Memorial Drive Park in Adelaide in Australia and was part of the World Series of the 1997 ATP Tour. The tournament ran from 30 December 1996 through 5 January 1997.

== Finals ==
=== Singles ===
(Australia) Todd Woodbridge defeated (Australia) Scott Draper 6–2, 6–1

- It was Woodbridge's 1st title of the year and the 53rd of his career.

=== Doubles ===
(Australia) Patrick Rafter / (United States) Bryan Shelton defeated (Australia) Todd Woodbridge / (Australia) Mark Woodforde 6–4, 1–6, 6–3

- It was Rafter's 1st title of the year and the 5th of his career. It was Shelton's only title of the year and the 4th of his career.
