= 1998 St. Petersburg Open =

Men's tennis tournament

- Date: 9–15 February
- Edition: 4th
- Category: World Series
- Draw: 32S / 16D
- Prize money: $315,000
- Surface: Carpet / indoor
- Location: St. Petersburg, Russia
- Venue: Petersburg Sports and Concert Complex

Champions

Singles
- (Netherlands) Richard Krajicek

Doubles
- (Sweden) Nicklas Kulti / (Sweden) Mikael Tillström
← 1997 ·	St. Petersburg Open	· 1999 →

The 1998 St. Petersburg Open was a men's tennis tournament played on indoor carpet courts at the Petersburg Sports and Concert Complex in Saint Petersburg, Russia and was part of the World Series of the 1998 ATP Tour. The tournament ran from 9 February through 15 February 1998. First-seeded Richard Krajicek won the singles title.

== Finals ==
=== Singles ===
(Netherlands) Richard Krajicek defeated (Switzerland) Marc Rosset 6–4, 7–6^{(7–5)}

- It was Krajicek's 1st title of the year and the 14th of his career.

=== Doubles ===
(Sweden) Nicklas Kulti / (Sweden) Mikael Tillström defeated (South Africa) Marius Barnard / (South Africa) Brent Haygarth 3–6, 6–3, 7–6

- It was Kulti's 1st title of the year and the 8th of his career. It was Tillström's 1st title of the year and the 4th of his career.
