= 1999 ABN AMRO World Tennis Tournament – Singles =

Singles
- 1999 ABN AMRO World Tennis Tournament

Final
- Champion: (Russia) Yevgeny Kafelnikov
- Runner-up: (United Kingdom) Tim Henman
- Score: 6–2, 7–6^{(7–3)}

Details
- Draw: 32 (3WC/4Q)
- Seeds: 8

Events
Singles	Doubles
- Rotterdam Open

Jan Siemerink was the defending champion, but lost in the first round to Fabrice Santoro.

Yevgeny Kafelnikov won in the final 6–2, 7–6^{(7–3)}, against Tim Henman.

== Seeds ==
1. (Spain) Àlex Corretja (first round)
2. (Russia) Yevgeny Kafelnikov (champion)
3. (United Kingdom) Tim Henman (final)
4. (Netherlands) Richard Krajicek (second round)
5. (United Kingdom) Greg Rusedski (semifinals)
6. (Slovakia) Karol Kučera (quarterfinals)
7. (Sweden) Thomas Enqvist (first round)
8. (Croatia) Goran Ivanišević (first round)

== Draw ==
Key

- Q = Qualifier
- WC = Wild card
- LL = Lucky loser
- Alt = Alternate
- ITF = ITF entry
- PR = Protected ranking
- SR = Special ranking
- SE = Special exempt
- JE = Junior exempt
- JR = Junior Accelerator Programme entrant
- CO = College Accelerator Programme entrant
- NG = Next Gen Accelerator Program entrant
- w/o = Walkover
- r = Retired
- d = Defaulted

=== Finals ===
Semifinals
(Russia) Marat Safin	6^{7}	6^{0}
3	(United Kingdom) Tim Henman	7	7
5	(United Kingdom) Greg Rusedski	4	2
2	(Russia) Yevgeny Kafelnikov	6	6

Final
3	(United Kingdom) Tim Henman	2	6^{3}
2	(Russia) Yevgeny Kafelnikov	6	7

=== Top half ===
First round
1	(Spain) À Corretja	5	6	3
(Russia) M Safin	7	3	6
(Slovakia) D Hrbatý	6	6^{5}	7
WC	(Netherlands) P Wessels	3	7	6^{2}
(France) J Golmard	6	6
(Spain) F Mantilla	0	4
(South Africa) W Ferreira	7	6
7	(Sweden) T Enqvist	6^{7}	3
3	(United Kingdom) T Henman	1	6	6
(Italy) D Sanguinetti	6	4	3
(Czech Republic) P Korda	6	6
(Sweden) M Gustafsson	4	2
(France) F Santoro	7	6
(Netherlands) J Siemerink	6^{6}	3
(Zimbabwe) B Black	1	1
6	(Slovakia) K Kučera	6	6

Second round
(Russia) M Safin	7	5	6
(Slovakia) D Hrbatý	6^{4}	7	3
(France) J Golmard	7	3	6^{4}
(South Africa) W Ferreira	5	6	7
3	(United Kingdom) T Henman	6	6
(Czech Republic) P Korda	3	4
(France) F Santoro	6^{4}	4
6	(Slovakia) K Kučera	7	6

Quarterfinals
(Russia) M Safin	6	6^{5}	6
(South Africa) W Ferreira	2	7	1
3	(United Kingdom) T Henman	6	7
6	(Slovakia) K Kučera	4	6^{4}

Semifinals
(Russia) M Safin	6^{7}	6^{0}
3	(United Kingdom) T Henman	7	7

=== Bottom half ===
First round
5	(United Kingdom) G Rusedski	7	4	6
(Germany) N Kiefer	6^{5}	6	3
WC	(Netherlands) E Kempes	6	7
Q	(Slovakia) J Krošlák	4	6^{1}
(France) C Pioline	3	7	7
WC	(Netherlands) P Haarhuis	6	6^{6}	6^{5}
(Switzerland) M Rosset	3	5
4	(Netherlands) R Krajicek	6	7
8	(Croatia) G Ivanišević	7	6^{3}	5
(Czech Republic) B Ulihrach	6^{6}	7	7
Q	(Switzerland) R Federer	6^{4}	7	7
(France) G Raoux	7	5	6^{3}
(Morocco) H Arazi	7	7
Q	(Argentina) G Etlis	6^{8}	5
Q	(Germany) R Schüttler	5	3
2	(Russia) Y Kafelnikov	7	6

Second round
5	(United Kingdom) G Rusedski	6	6
WC	(Netherlands) E Kempes	1	4
(France) C Pioline	7	7
4	(Netherlands) R Krajicek	6^{5}	6^{9}
(Czech Republic) B Ulihrach	4	5
Q	(Switzerland) R Federer	6	7
(Morocco) H Arazi	1	2
2	(Russia) Y Kafelnikov	6	6

Quarterfinals
5	(United Kingdom) G Rusedski	7	3	7
(France) C Pioline	6^{5}	6	6^{5}
Q	(Switzerland) R Federer	1	7	4
2	(Russia) Y Kafelnikov	6	5	6

Semifinals
5	(United Kingdom) G Rusedski	4	2
2	(Russia) Y Kafelnikov	6	6

== Qualifying ==
=== Qualifying seeds ===
1. (Morocco) Karim Alami (first round, withdrew)
2. (Germany) Rainer Schüttler (qualified)
3. (Czech Republic) Martin Damm (qualifying competition)
4. (Romania) Adrian Voinea (first round)
5. (Slovakia) Ján Krošlák (qualified)
6. (Germany) Hendrik Dreekmann (first round, withdrew)
7. (Italy) Vincenzo Santopadre (qualifying competition)
8. (Bulgaria) Orlin Stanoytchev (first round)

=== Qualifiers ===
1. (Argentina) Gastón Etlis
2. (Germany) Rainer Schüttler
3. (Switzerland) Roger Federer
4. (Slovakia) Ján Krošlák

=== Qualifying draws ===
==== First qualifier ====
First round
1	(Morocco) Karim Alami
(Argentina) Gastón Etlis	w/o
WC	(Netherlands) Raemon Sluiter	6	6
8	(Bulgaria) Orlin Stanoytchev	4	4

Qualifying competition
(Argentina) Gastón Etlis	6	1
WC	(Netherlands) Raemon Sluiter	3	0^{r}

==== Second qualifier ====
First round
2	(Germany) Rainer Schüttler	3	6	6
(Netherlands) Dennis van Scheppingen	6	1	3
(South Africa) Neville Godwin	5	6	4
7	(Italy) Vincenzo Santopadre	7	3	6

Qualifying competition
2	(Germany) Rainer Schüttler	6	6	6
7	(Italy) Vincenzo Santopadre	4	7	4

==== Third qualifier ====
First round
3	(Czech Republic) Martin Damm	6	6
Alt	(Australia) Peter Tramacchi	2	4
WC	(Switzerland) Roger Federer	w/o
6	(Germany) Hendrik Dreekmann

Qualifying competition
3	(Czech Republic) Martin Damm	2	6
WC	(Switzerland) Roger Federer	6	7

==== Fourth qualifier ====
First round
4	(Romania) Adrian Voinea	0	3
WC	(Sweden) Nicklas Kulti	6	6
(Italy) Marzio Martelli	3	6	3
5	(Slovakia) Ján Krošlák	6	1	6

Qualifying competition
WC	(Sweden) Nicklas Kulti	4	2
5	(Slovakia) Ján Krošlák	6	6
