= 2000 ABN AMRO World Tennis Tournament – Doubles =

Doubles
- 2000 ABN AMRO World Tennis Tournament

Final
- Champions: (South Africa) David Adams (South Africa) John-Laffnie de Jager
- Runners-up: (United Kingdom) Tim Henman (Russia) Yevgeny Kafelnikov
- Score: 5–7, 6–2, 6–3

Details
- Draw: 16
- Seeds: 4

Events
Singles	Doubles
- ABN AMRO World Tennis Tournament

David Adams and John-Laffnie de Jager were the defending champions, and won in the final 5–7, 6–2, 6–3, against Tim Henman and Yevgeny Kafelnikov.

== Seeds ==
1. (Australia) Wayne Arthurs / (Australia) Sandon Stolle (semifinals)
2. (South Africa) David Adams / (South Africa) John-Laffnie de Jager (champions)
3. (France) Olivier Delaître / (United States) Jeff Tarango (quarterfinals)
4. (Sweden) Jonas Björkman / (Czech Republic) Daniel Vacek (first round)

== Draw ==
Key

- Q = Qualifier
- WC = Wild card
- LL = Lucky loser
- Alt = Alternate
- ITF = ITF entry
- PR = Protected ranking
- SR = Special ranking
- SE = Special exempt
- JE = Junior exempt
- JR = Junior Accelerator Programme entrant
- CO = College Accelerator Programme entrant
- NG = Next Gen Accelerator Program entrant
- w/o = Walkover
- r = Retired
- d = Defaulted

=== Draw ===
First round
1	(Australia) W Arthurs (Australia) S Stolle	6	7
(Slovakia) D Hrbatý (Romania) A Pavel	4	6^{4}
(Spain) T Carbonell (Spain) J Sánchez	6	6
(South Africa) P Norval (Zimbabwe) K Ullyett	4	4
4	(Sweden) J Björkman (Czech Republic) D Vacek	6	3	2
WC	(United Kingdom) T Henman (Russia) Y Kafelnikov	4	6	6
(Australia) J Eagle (Australia) A Florent	7	3	2
(Sweden) N Kulti (Sweden) P Nyborg	5	6	6
(South Africa) M Barnard (South Africa) C Haggard	6	5	3
(Czech Republic) J Novák (Czech Republic) D Rikl	4	7	6
WC	(Netherlands) P Haarhuis (Netherlands) J Siemerink	1	7	1
3	(France) O Delaître (United States) J Tarango	6	6^{8}	6
WC	(Netherlands) S Schalken (Netherlands) R Sluiter	6	6
(Australia) A Kratzmann (Australia) P Tramacchi	4	4
(Croatia) G Ivanišević (North Macedonia) A Kitinov	2	4
2	(South Africa) D Adams (South Africa) J-L de Jager	6	6

Quarterfinals
1	(Australia) W Arthurs (Australia) S Stolle	6	7
(Spain) T Carbonell (Spain) J Sánchez	1	6^{5}
WC	(United Kingdom) T Henman (Russia) Y Kafelnikov	w/o
(Sweden) N Kulti (Sweden) P Nyborg
(Czech Republic) J Novák (Czech Republic) D Rikl	6	4	7
3	(France) O Delaître (United States) J Tarango	2	6	5
WC	(Netherlands) S Schalken (Netherlands) R Sluiter	1	5
2	(South Africa) D Adams (South Africa) J-L de Jager	6	7

Semifinals
1	(Australia) W Arthurs (Australia) S Stolle	6	3	4
WC	(United Kingdom) T Henman (Russia) Y Kafelnikov	4	6	6
(Czech Republic) J Novák (Czech Republic) D Rikl	3	4
2	(South Africa) D Adams (South Africa) J-L de Jager	6	6

Final
WC	(United Kingdom) T Henman (Russia) Y Kafelnikov	7	2	3
2	(South Africa) D Adams (South Africa) J-L de Jager	5	6	6
