= 1999 ABN AMRO World Tennis Tournament =

- Date: 15–21 February
- Edition: 27th
- Category: ATP International Series Gold
- Draw: 32S / 16D
- Prize money: $725,000
- Surface: Carpet/ indoor
- Location: Rotterdam, Netherlands
- Venue: Rotterdam Ahoy

Champions

Singles
- (Russia) Yevgeny Kafelnikov

Doubles
- (South Africa) David Adams / (South Africa) John-Laffnie de Jager
- ABN AMRO World Tennis Tournament

The 1999 ABN AMRO World Tennis Tournament was a men's tennis tournament played on indoor carpet courts. It was the 27th edition of the event known that year as the ABN AMRO World Tennis Tournament, and was part of the ATP International Series Gold of the 1999 ATP Tour. It took place at the Rotterdam Ahoy indoor sporting arena in Rotterdam, Netherlands, from 15 February through 21 February 1999. Second-seeded Yevgeny Kafelnikov won the singles title.

The singles field featured ATP No. 4, ATP Tour World Championships winner, and recent Sydney finalist Àlex Corretja, Australian Open champion, Halle and Moscow titlist Yevgeny Kafelnikov, and Tashkent and Basel winner, Doha runner-up Tim Henman. Also lined up were Stuttgart Super 9 titlist Richard Krajicek, Paris Super 9 champion Greg Rusedski, Karol Kučera, Thomas Enqvist and Goran Ivanišević.

== Finals ==
=== Singles ===
(Russia) Yevgeny Kafelnikov defeated (United Kingdom) Tim Henman, 6–2, 7–6^{(7–3)}

- It was Yevgeny Kafelnikov's 2nd title of the year, and his 19th overall.

=== Doubles ===
(South Africa) David Adams / (South Africa) John-Laffnie de Jager defeated (United Kingdom) Neil Broad / (Australia) Peter Tramacchi, 6–7^{(5–7)}, 6–3, 6–4
