= 1997 St. Petersburg Open =

- Date: 17–23 March
- Edition: 3rd
- Category: World Series
- Draw: 32S / 16D
- Prize money: $300,000
- Surface: Carpet / indoor
- Location: St. Petersburg, Russia
- Venue: Petersburg Sports and Concert Complex

Champions

Singles
- (Sweden) Thomas Johansson

Doubles
- (Russia) Andrei Olhovskiy / (New Zealand) Brett Steven
← 1996 ·	St. Petersburg Open	· 1998 →

The 1997 St. Petersburg Open was a men's tennis tournament played on indoor carpet courts at the Petersburg Sports and Concert Complex in Saint Petersburg in Russia and was part of the World Series of the 1997 ATP Tour. The tournament was held from 17 March through 23 March 1997. Fifth-seeded Thomas Johansson won the singles title.

== Finals ==
=== Singles ===
(Sweden) Thomas Johansson defeated (Italy) Renzo Furlan 6–3, 6–4

- It was Johansson's 2nd title of the year and the 2nd of his career.

=== Doubles ===
(Russia) Andrei Olhovskiy / (New Zealand) Brett Steven defeated (Germany) David Prinosil / (Czech Republic) Daniel Vacek 6–4, 6–3

- It was Olhovskiy's 2nd title of the year and the 15th of his career. It was Steven's 2nd title of the year and the 7th of his career.
