= Igor Tchelychev =

Russian tennis player

- Country (sports): Russia
- Born: 9 January 1977 (age 48)

Singles
- Career record: 0–1
- Highest ranking: No. 355 (7 July 1997)

Doubles
- Career record: 0–3
- Highest ranking: No. 484 (12 May 1997)

Igor Tchelychev (born 9 January 1977) is a Russian former professional tennis player.

Tchelychev won two bronze medals in doubles for Russia at the 1995 Summer Universiade and made his only ATP Tour singles main draw appearance at the 1997 St. Petersburg Open, as a wildcard entrant. He was the first player beaten by Roger Federer in a rankings match on the professional tour.
