= Artemi Tchernenko =

Russian tennis player

- Country (sports): Russia
- Born: 4 April 1978 (age 46)
- Plays: Right-handed
- Prize money: $10,832

Singles
- Career record: 0–2
- Highest ranking: No. 800 (5 Oct 1998)

Doubles
- Career record: 1–1
- Highest ranking: No. 552 (18 Jan 1999)

Artemi Tchernenko (born 4 April 1978) is a Russian former professional tennis player.

On the ATP Tour, Tchernenko featured twice in the St. Petersburg Open main draw, losing first round matches to Nicolas Kiefer in 1996 and Marc Rosset in 1998. He was a doubles quarter-finalist at the 1998 tournament, with Ģirts Dzelde.

Tchernenko is married to politician and former Olympic speed skater Svetlana Zhurova.
