= Martin Damm =

Czech tennis player (born 1972)

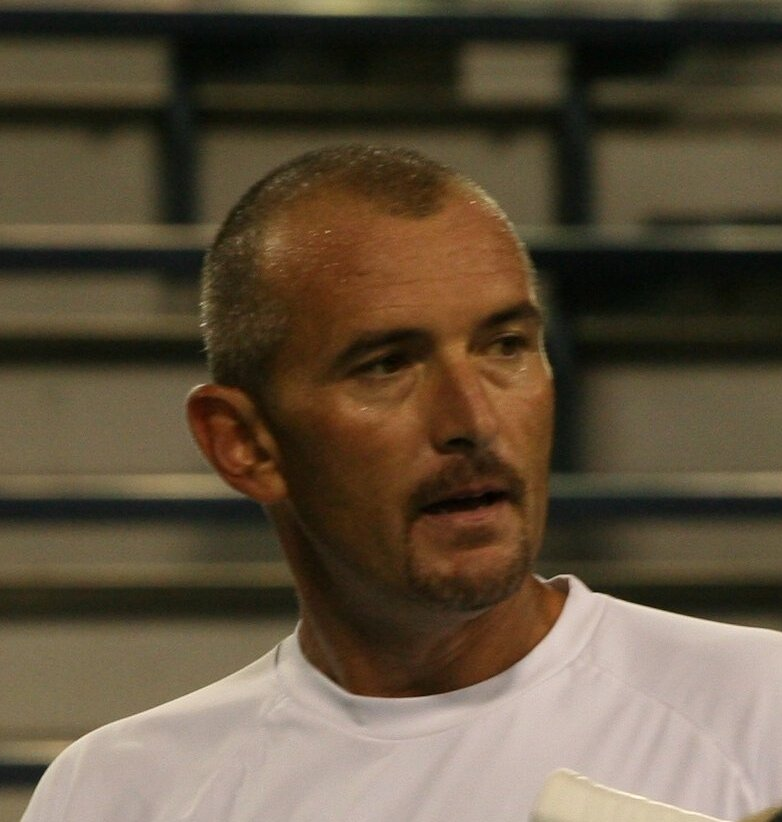
- Martin Damm at the 2009 US Open
- Country (sports): Czechoslovakia (1990–92); Czech Republic (1993–2011)
- Residence: Bradenton, Florida, USA
- Born: 1 August 1972 (age 54) Liberec, Czechoslovakia (now Czech Republic)
- Height: 1.89 m (6 ft 2 1/2 in)
- Turned pro: 1990
- Retired: 2011
- Plays: Right-handed (two-handed backhand)
- Prize money: $5,730,972

Singles
- Career record: 157–210
- Career titles: 0
- Highest ranking: No. 42 (18 August 1997)

Grand Slam singles results
- Australian Open: 4R (1994)
- French Open: 2R (1999)
- Wimbledon: 3R (1994, 2000)
- US Open: 3R (1997)

Doubles
- Career record: 567–412
- Career titles: 40
- Highest ranking: No. 5 (30 April 2007)

Grand Slam doubles results
- Australian Open: F (2006)
- French Open: QF (2002, 2005)
- Wimbledon: SF (1997, 2006)
- US Open: W (2006)

Martin Damm Sr. (born 1 August 1972) is a Czech former professional tennis player. He had a career-high doubles ranking of world No. 5 in the world, achieved in April 2007, and a singles ranking of No. 42, achieved in August 1997. Damm won 40 ATP Tour-level doubles titles, including a major at the 2006 US Open. He reached five ATP Tour singles finals. Damm retired from the sport in September 2011. His son, Martin Damm Jr., is also a professional tennis player.

== Personal life ==
Damm and wife, Michaela, have two sons (Maxmillian Martin; born 1 February 2002) and Martin Jr. (born 30 September 2003), and one daughter (Laura Michelle Damm; born 3 December 2007), all born in Bradenton, Florida.

== Grand Slam finals ==
=== Doubles: 3 (1–2) ===
Result	Year	Championship	Surface	Partner	Opponents	Score
Loss	1993	US Open	Hard	(Czech Republic) Karel Nováček	(United States) Ken Flach (United States) Rick Leach	7–6^{(7–3)}, 4–6, 2–6
Loss	2006	Australian Open	Hard	(India) Leander Paes	(United States) Bob Bryan (United States) Mike Bryan	6–4, 3–6, 4–6
Winner	2006	US Open	Hard	(India) Leander Paes	(Sweden) Jonas Björkman (Belarus) Max Mirnyi	6–7^{(5–7)}, 6–4, 6–3

=== Mixed doubles: 1 (0–1) ===
Result	Year	Championship	Surface	Partner	Opponents	Score
Loss	2006	US Open	Hard	(Czech Republic) Květa Peschke	(United States) Martina Navratilova (United States) Bob Bryan	2–6, 3–6

== Career finals ==
=== Doubles: 64 (40 wins / 24 losses) ===
Legend Grand Slam (1) Tennis Masters Cup / ATP World Tour Finals (0) ATP Masters Series / ATP World Tour Masters 1000 (4) ATP International Series Gold / ATP World Tour 500 Series (9) ATP International Series / ATP World Tour 250 Series (26)	Titles by surface Hard (21) Clay (5) Grass (5) Carpet (9)

Result	No.	Date	Tournament	Surface	Partner	Opponents	Score
Loss	1.	Mar 1993	Copenhagen	Carpet	(Czech Republic) Daniel Vacek	(South Africa) David Adams (Russia) Andrei Olhovskiy	3–6, 6–3, 3–6
Win	1.	Mar 1993	Zaragoza	Carpet	(Czech Republic) Karel Nováček	(United States) Mike Bauer (Czech Republic) David Rikl	2–6, 6–4, 7–5
Win	2.	May 1993	Munich	Clay	(Sweden) Henrik Holm	(Germany) Carl-Uwe Steeb (Czech Republic) Karel Nováček	6–0, 3–6, 7–5
Loss	2.	Sep 1993	US Open	Hard	(Czech Republic) Karel Nováček	(United States) Ken Flach (United States) Rick Leach	7–6^{(7–3)}, 4–6, 2–6
Loss	3.	Feb 1994	Marseille	Carpet	(Russia) Yevgeny Kafelnikov	(Netherlands) Jan Siemerink (Czech Republic) Daniel Vacek	7–6, 4–6, 1–6
Win	3.	Mar 1994	Copenhagen	Carpet	(New Zealand) Brett Steven	(Germany) David Prinosil (Germany) Udo Riglewski	6–3, 6–4
Loss	4.	Mar 1994	Zaragoza	Carpet	(Czech Republic) Karel Nováček	(Sweden) Henrik Holm (Sweden) Anders Järryd	5–7, 2–6
Win	4.	Apr 1994	Osaka	Hard	(Australia) Sandon Stolle	(South Africa) David Adams (Russia) Andrei Olhovskiy	6–4, 6–4
Win	5.	Oct 1994	Ostrava	Carpet	(Czech Republic) Karel Nováček	(South Africa) Gary Muller (South Africa) Piet Norval	6–4, 1–6, 6–3
Loss	5.	Oct 1994	Lyon	Carpet	(Australia) Patrick Rafter	(Switzerland) Jakob Hlasek (Russia) Yevgeny Kafelnikov	7–6, 6–7, 6–7
Win	6.	Mar 1995	Rotterdam	Carpet	(Sweden) Anders Järryd	(Spain) Tomás Carbonell (Spain) Francisco Roig	6–3, 6–2
Win	7.	Mar 1995	St. Petersburg	Carpet	(Sweden) Anders Järryd	(Switzerland) Jakob Hlasek (Russia) Yevgeny Kafelnikov	6–4, 6–2
Loss	6.	Feb 1996	Zagreb	Carpet	(Netherlands) Hendrik Jan Davids	(Netherlands) Menno Oosting (Belgium) Libor Pimek	3–6, 6–7
Loss	7.	Oct 1996	Singapore	Carpet	(Russia) Andrei Olhovskiy	(Australia) Todd Woodbridge (Australia) Mark Woodforde	6–7, 6–7
Win	8.	Oct 1996	Beijing	Carpet	(Russia) Andrei Olhovskiy	(Germany) Patrik Kühnen (South Africa) Gary Muller	6–4, 7–5
Win	9.	Apr 1997	Hong Kong	Hard	(Czech Republic) Daniel Vacek	(Germany) Karsten Braasch (United States) Jeff Tarango	6–3, 6–4
Win	10.	Apr 1997	Tokyo	Hard	(Czech Republic) Daniel Vacek	(United States) Justin Gimelstob (Australia) Patrick Rafter	2–6, 6–2, 7–6^{(7–4)}
Win	11.	Nov 1997	Moscow	Carpet	(Czech Republic) Cyril Suk	(South Africa) David Adams (France) Fabrice Santoro	6–4, 6–3
Win	12.	Feb 1998	Split	Carpet	(Czech Republic) Jiří Novák	(Sweden) Frederik Bergh (Sweden) Patrik Frederiksson	7–6^{(7–3)}, 6–2
Win	13.	Mar 1998	London	Carpet	(United States) Jim Grabb	(Russia) Yevgeny Kafelnikov (Czech Republic) Daniel Vacek	6–4, 7–5
Win	14.	Aug 1998	Toronto	Hard	(United States) Jim Grabb	(South Africa) Ellis Ferreira (United States) Rick Leach	6–7^{(2–7)}, 6–2, 7–6^{(7–4)}
Win	15.	May 1999	Prague	Clay	(Czech Republic) Radek Štěpánek	(United States) Mark Keil (Ecuador) Nicolás Lapentti	6–0, 6–2
Win	16.	Mar 2000	Copenhagen	Hard (i)	(Germany) David Prinosil	(Sweden) Jonas Björkman (Canada) Sébastien Lareau	6–1, 5–7, 7–5
Loss	8.	Apr 2000	Miami	Hard	(Slovakia) Dominik Hrbatý	(Australia) Todd Woodbridge (Australia) Mark Woodforde	3–6, 4–6
Win	17.	May 2000	Rome	Clay	(Slovakia) Dominik Hrbatý	(South Africa) Wayne Ferreira (Russia) Yevgeny Kafelnikov	6–4, 4–6, 6–3
Win	18.	Jun 2000	s’Hertogenbosch	Grass	(Czech Republic) Cyril Suk	(Netherlands) Paul Haarhuis (Australia) Sandon Stolle	6–4, 6–7^{(5–7)}, 7–6^{(7–5)}
Loss	9.	Jun 2001	s’Hertogenbosch	Grass	(Czech Republic) Cyril Suk	(Netherlands) Paul Haarhuis (Netherlands) Sjeng Schalken	4–6, 4–6
Loss	10.	Aug 2001	Cincinnati	Hard	(Germany) David Prinosil	(India) Mahesh Bhupathi (India) Leander Paes	6–7^{(3–7)}, 3–6
Win	19.	Aug 2001	Washington, D.C.	Hard	(Germany) David Prinosil	(United States) Bob Bryan (United States) Mike Bryan	7–6^{(7–5)}, 6–3
Win	20.	Oct 2001	Vienna	Hard (i)	(Czech Republic) Radek Štěpánek	(Czech Republic) Jiří Novák (Czech Republic) David Rikl	6–3, 6–2
Loss	11.	Mar 2002	Acapulco	Clay	(Czech Republic) David Rikl	(United States) Bob Bryan (United States) Mike Bryan	1–6, 6–3, [2–10]
Win	21.	Mar 2002	Delray Beach	Hard	(Czech Republic) Cyril Suk	(South Africa) David Adams (Australia) Ben Ellwood	6–4, 6–7^{(5–7)}, [10–5]
Win	22.	May 2002	Rome	Clay	(Czech Republic) Cyril Suk	(Zimbabwe) Wayne Black (Zimbabwe) Kevin Ullyett	7–5, 7–5
Win	23.	Jun 2002	s’Hertogenbosch	Grass	(Czech Republic) Cyril Suk	(Netherlands) Paul Haarhuis (United States) Brian MacPhie	7–6^{(8–6)}, 6–7^{(6–8)}, 6–4
Win	24.	Jan 2003	Doha	Hard	(Czech Republic) Cyril Suk	(The Bahamas) Mark Knowles (Canada) Daniel Nestor	6–4, 7–6^{(10–8)}
Loss	12.	Jun 2003	Halle	Grass	(Czech Republic) Cyril Suk	(Sweden) Jonas Björkman (Australia) Todd Woodbridge	3–6, 4–6
Win	25.	Jun 2003	s’Hertogenbosch	Grass	(Czech Republic) Cyril Suk	(United States) Donald Johnson (India) Leander Paes	7–5, 7–6^{(7–4)}
Win	26.	Jul 2003	Kitzbühel	Clay	(Czech Republic) Cyril Suk	(Austria) Jürgen Melzer (Austria) Alexander Peya	6–4, 6–4
Loss	13.	Aug 2003	Long Island	Hard	(Czech Republic) Cyril Suk	(South Africa) Robbie Koenig (Argentina) Martín Rodríguez	3–6, 6–7^{(4–7)}
Win	27.	Jan 2004	Doha	Hard	(Czech Republic) Cyril Suk	(Austria) Stefan Koubek (United States) Andy Roddick	6–2, 6–4
Loss	14.	Mar 2004	Marseille	Hard (i)	(Czech Republic) Cyril Suk	(The Bahamas) Mark Knowles (Canada) Daniel Nestor	5–7, 3–6
Loss	15.	May 2004	Prague	Clay	(Czech Republic) Dušan Karol	(Slovakia) Karol Kučera (Czech Republic) Cyril Suk	3–6, 7–6^{(7–5)}, 3–6
Win	28.	Jun 2004	s’Hertogenbosch	Grass	(Czech Republic) Cyril Suk	(Germany) Lars Burgsmüller (Czech Republic) Jan Vacek	6–3, 6–7^{(7–9)}, 6–3
Win	29.	Oct 2004	Vienna	Hard (i)	(Czech Republic) Cyril Suk	(Argentina) Gastón Etlis (Argentina) Martín Rodríguez	6–7^{(4–7)}, 6–4, 7–6^{(7–4)}
Win	30.	Feb 2005	Marseille	Hard	(Czech Republic) Radek Štěpánek	(The Bahamas) Mark Knowles (Canada) Daniel Nestor	7–6^{(7–4)}, 7–6^{(7–5)}
Win	31.	Feb 2005	Dubai	Hard	(Czech Republic) Radek Štěpánek	(Sweden) Jonas Björkman (France) Fabrice Santoro	6–2, 6–4
Loss	16.	May 2005	St. Pölten	Clay	(Argentina) Mariano Hood	(Argentina) Lucas Arnold Ker (Australia) Paul Hanley	3–6, 4–6
Loss	17.	Jan 2006	Australian Open	Hard	(India) Leander Paes	(United States) Bob Bryan (United States) Mike Bryan	6–4, 3–6, 4–6
Win	32.	Feb 2006	Marseille	Hard (i)	(Czech Republic) Radek Štěpánek	(The Bahamas) Mark Knowles (Canada) Daniel Nestor	6–2, 6–7^{(4–7)}, [10–3]
Win	33.	Jun 2006	s’Hertogenbosch	Grass	(India) Leander Paes	(South Africa) Chris Haggard (France) Arnaud Clément	6–1, 7–6^{(7–3)}
Win	34.	Sep 2006	US Open	Hard	(India) Leander Paes	(Sweden) Jonas Björkman (Belarus) Max Mirnyi	6–7^{(5–7)}, 6–4, 6–3
Loss	18.	Jan 2007	Doha	Hard	(India) Leander Paes	(Russia) Mikhail Youzhny (Serbia) Nenad Zimonjić	1–6, 6–7^{(3–7)}
Win	35.	Feb 2007	Rotterdam	Hard (i)	(India) Leander Paes	(Romania) Andrei Pavel (Germany) Alexander Waske	6–3, 6–7^{(5–7)}, [10–7]
Win	36.	Mar 2007	Indian Wells	Hard	(India) Leander Paes	(Israel) Jonathan Erlich (Israel) Andy Ram	6–4, 6–4
Loss	19.	Apr 2007	Miami	Hard	(India) Leander Paes	(United States) Bob Bryan (United States) Mike Bryan	7–6^{(9–7)}, 3–6, [7–10]
Loss	20.	Jun 2007	s'Hertogenbosch	Grass	(India) Leander Paes	(South Africa) Jeff Coetzee (Netherlands) Rogier Wassen	6–3, 6–7^{(5–7)}, [10–12]
Win	37.	Feb 2008	Marseille	Hard (i)	(Czech Republic) Pavel Vízner	(Switzerland) Yves Allegro (South Africa) Jeff Coetzee	7–6^{(7–0)}, 7–5
Loss	21.	Mar 2008	Dubai	Hard	(Czech Republic) Pavel Vízner	(India) Mahesh Bhupathi (The Bahamas) Mark Knowles	5–7, 6–7^{(7–9)}
Win	38.	Jan 2009	Auckland	Hard	(Sweden) Robert Lindstedt	(United States) Scott Lipsky (India) Leander Paes	7–5, 6–4
Win	39.	Feb 2009	Zagreb	Hard (i)	(Sweden) Robert Lindstedt	(Germany) Christopher Kas (Netherlands) Rogier Wassen	6–4, 6–3
Loss	22.	Feb 2009	Dubai	Hard	(Sweden) Robert Lindstedt	(South Africa) Rik de Voest (Russia) Dmitry Tursunov	6–4, 3–6, [5–10]
Loss	23.	May 2009	Estoril	Clay	(Sweden) Robert Lindstedt	(United States) Eric Butorac (United States) Scott Lipsky	3–6, 2–6
Win	40.	Aug 2009	Washington, D.C.	Hard	(Sweden) Robert Lindstedt	(Poland) Mariusz Fyrstenberg (Poland) Marcin Matkowski	7–5, 7–6^{(7–3)}
Loss	24.	Jun 2010	Halle	Grass	(Slovakia) Filip Polášek	(Ukraine) Sergiy Stakhovsky (Russia) Mikhail Youzhny	6–4, 5–7, [7–10]

== ATP Tour and Challenger finals ==
=== Singles (5–12) ===
Result	No.	Date	Tournament	Surface	Opponent	Score
Win	1.	22 July 1991	Warsaw	Clay	(Czechoslovakia) David Rikl	3–6, 7–5, 6–4
Win	2.	5 October 1992	Dublin	Hard	(Germany) Arne Thoms	6–3, 6–2
Win	3.	2 November 1992	Aachen	Carpet	(New Zealand) Brett Steven	6–4, 7–6
Loss	1.	25 January 1993	Heilbronn	Carpet	(Germany) David Prinosil	3–6, 6–7
Win	4.	25 October 1993	Munich	Carpet	(Canada) Sébastien Lareau	6–3, 6–1
Loss	2.	30 May 1994	Annenheim	Grass	(Italy) Diego Nargiso	4–6, 2–6
Loss	3.	2 January 1995	Wellington	Hard	(New Zealand) Brett Steven	3–6, 3–6
Loss	4.	5 June 1995	Annenheim	Grass	(Sweden) Henrik Holm	2–6, 3–6
Loss	5.	30 October 1995	Aachen	Carpet	(Germany) Jörn Renzenbrink	7–5, 3–6, 4–6
Loss	6.	29 April 1996	Seoul	Hard	(Zimbabwe) Byron Black	6–7, 3–6
Loss	7.	26 August 1996	Long Island	Hard	(Ukraine) Andrei Medvedev	5–7, 3–6
Loss	8.	14 October 1996	Beijing	Carpet	(United Kingdom) Greg Rusedski	6–7, 4–6
Loss	9.	17 March 1997	Copenhagen	Carpet	(Sweden) Thomas Johansson	4–6, 6–3, 2–6
Loss	10.	22 June 1998	s'Hertogenbosch	Grass	(Australia) Patrick Rafter	6–7, 2–6
Loss	11.	31 May 1999	Surbiton	Grass	(Armenia) Sargis Sargsian	6–7, 5–7
Loss	12.	29 November 1999	Nuembrecht	Carpet	(Switzerland) George Bastl	6–7, 3–6
Win	5.	14 February 2000	Wrocław	Hard (i)	(Italy) Gianluca Pozzi	4–6, 6–4, 6–3

== Doubles performance timeline ==
Key
W	F	SF	QF	#R	RR	Q#	DNQ	A	NH

(W) winner; (F) finalist; (SF) semifinalist; (QF) quarterfinalist; (#R) rounds 4, 3, 2, 1; (RR) round-robin stage; (Q#) qualification round; (DNQ) did not qualify; (A) absent; (NH) not held; (SR) strike rate (events won / competed); (W–L) win–loss record.

Tournament	1990	1991	1992	1993	1994	1995	1996	1997	1998	1999	2000	2001	2002	2003	2004	2005	2006	2007	2008	2009	2010	2011	SR
Grand Slam tournaments
Australian Open	A	A	A	1R	SF	2R	QF	QF	A	1R	3R	A	QF	3R	2R	1R	F	3R	QF	2R	2R	A	0 / 16
French Open	A	1R	1R	1R	2R	1R	A	2R	A	1R	3R	1R	QF	2R	1R	QF	1R	2R	1R	1R	1R	1R	0 / 19
Wimbledon	A	A	1R	1R	3R	A	1R	SF	3R	1R	2R	1R	QF	QF	3R	2R	SF	QF	1R	3R	3R	1R	0 / 20
US Open	A	A	1R	F	QF	2R	1R	3R	QF	1R	3R	3R	1R	QF	3R	3R	W	1R	3R	3R	2R	1R	1 / 20
Grand Slam SR	0 / 0	0 / 1	0 / 3	0 / 4	0 / 4	0 / 3	0 / 3	0 / 4	0 / 2	0 / 4	0 / 4	0 / 3	0 / 4	0 / 4	0 / 4	0 / 4	1 / 4	0 / 4	0 / 4	0 / 4	0 / 4	0 / 3	1 / 75
Masters 1000
Indian Wells Masters	A	A	A	A	A	A	A	A	A	A	2R	A	2R	QF	QF	A	2R	W	1R	1R	1R	A	1 / 9
Miami Masters	A	A	A	A	A	A	3R	A	A	QF	F	A	2R	QF	QF	1R	QF	F	QF	2R	2R	A	0 / 12
Monte-Carlo Masters	A	A	A	A	2R	A	A	A	1R	1R	A	A	QF	QF	SF	QF	2R	A	A	A	A	A	0 / 8
Rome Masters	A	A	A	A	A	1R	A	A	A	1R	W	A	W	SF	2R	2R	A	SF	A	A	A	A	0 / 8
Madrid Masters	A	A	A	A	A	A	1R	A	1R	A	A	SF	QF	QF	SF	QF	1R	2R	1R	A	A	A	0 / 10
Canada Masters	A	A	1R	2R	QF	1R	A	1R	W	2R	1R	1R	2R	SF	2R	QF	SF	QF	2R	A	A	A	1 / 16
Cincinnati Masters	A	A	A	A	1R	1R	2R	1R	2R	1R	QF	F	SF	QF	2R	QF	SF	SF	2R	A	A	A	0 / 15
Shanghai Masters	Not Held																			1R	A	A	0 / 1
Paris Masters	A	A	A	A	A	A	QF	2R	1R	A	A	A	2R	1R	QF	1R	1R	1R	1R	1R	A	A	0 / 11
Hamburg Masters	A	A	A	A	A	A	A	A	A	A	2R	A	A	QF	2R	A	1R	2R	QF	NM1			0 / 6
Masters SR	0 / 0	0 / 0	0 / 1	0 / 1	0 / 3	0 / 3	0 / 4	0 / 3	1 / 5	0 / 5	1 / 6	0 / 3	1 / 8	0 / 9	0 / 9	0 / 7	0 / 8	1 / 8	0 / 7	0 / 4	0 / 2	0 / 0	4 / 86
Year-end ranking	238	103	94	46	17	64	38	20	22	55	21	36	12	15	17	21	9	12	30	29	72	–	
