= Yevgeny Kafelnikov =

Russian tennis player (born 1974)

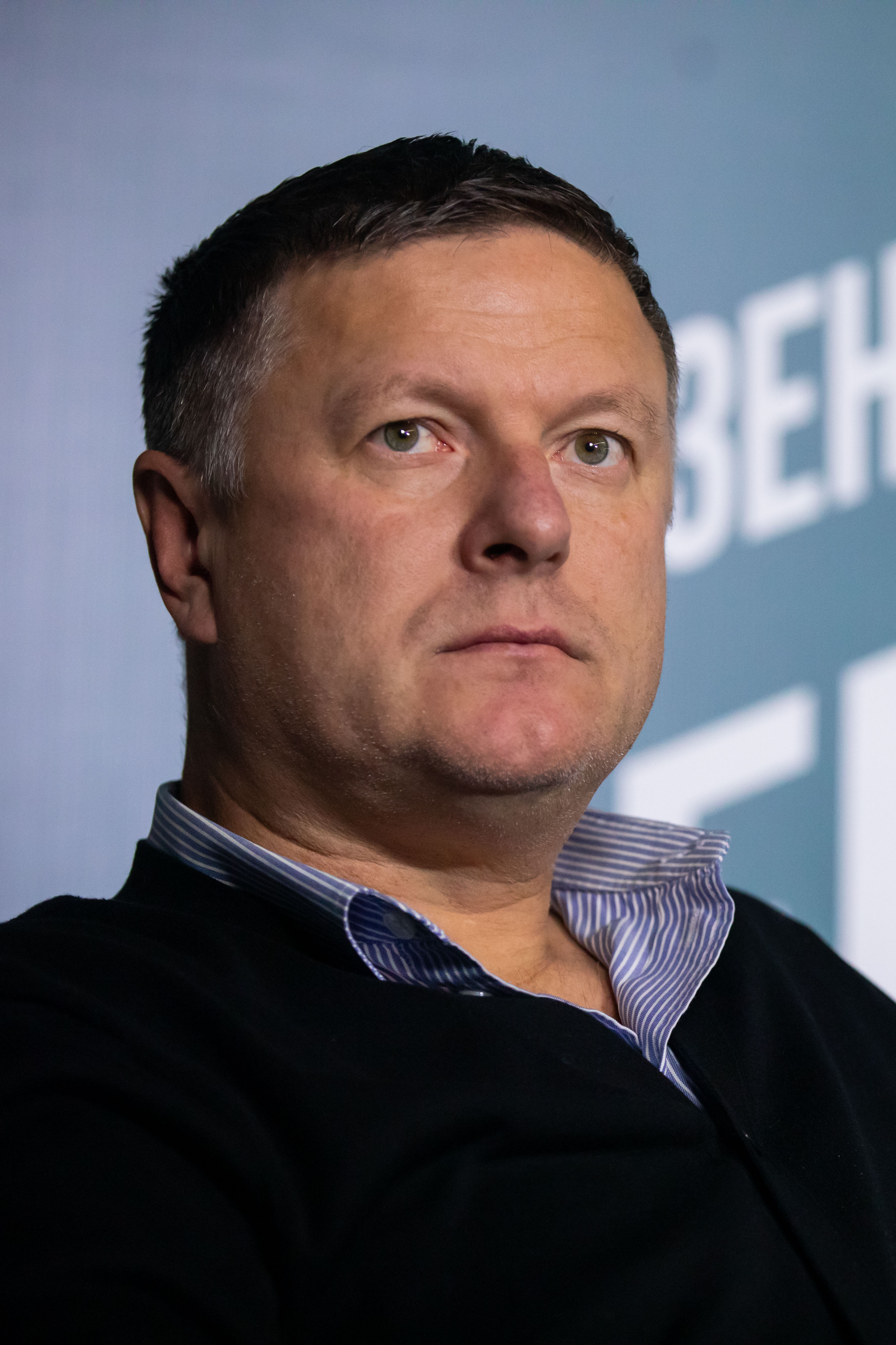
- Yevgeny Kafelnikov in 2023
- Full name: Yevgeny Aleksandrovich Kafelnikov
- Country (sports): Russia
- Residence: Sochi, Russia
- Born: 18 February 1974 (age 52) Sochi, Russian SFSR, Soviet Union
- Height: 1.90 m (6 ft 3 in)
- Turned pro: 1992
- Retired: 2010 (last match 2003)
- Plays: Right-handed (two-handed backhand)
- Prize money: US$23,883,797: 26th all-time leader in earnings
- Int. Tennis HoF: 2019 (member page)

Singles
- Career record: 609–306 (66.6%)
- Career titles: 26
- Highest ranking: No. 1 (3 May 1999)

Grand Slam singles results
- Australian Open: W (1999)
- French Open: W (1996)
- Wimbledon: QF (1995)
- US Open: SF (1999, 2001)

Other tournaments
- Tour Finals: F (1997)
- Grand Slam Cup: SF (1995, 1996)
- Olympic Games: W (2000)

Doubles
- Career record: 358–213 (62.7%)
- Career titles: 27
- Highest ranking: No. 4 (30 March 1998)

Grand Slam doubles results
- Australian Open: QF (1995, 1999)
- French Open: W (1996, 1997, 2002)
- Wimbledon: SF (1994, 1995)
- US Open: W (1997)

Team competitions
- Davis Cup: W (2002)
Medal record
Olympic Games – Tennis
Gold medal – first place	2000 Sydney	Singles

Yevgeny Aleksandrovich Kafelnikov (Russian: Евгений Александрович Кафельников, IPA: [jɪvˈɡʲenʲɪj ˈkafʲɪlʲnʲɪkəf]; born 18 February 1974) is a Russian former professional tennis player. He was ranked as the world No. 1 in men's singles by the Association of Tennis Professionals (ATP). Kafelnikov won 26 ATP Tour-level singles titles, including two majors at the 1996 French Open and the 1999 Australian Open, as well as an Olympic gold medal at the 2000 Sydney Olympics. He also won four major doubles titles (three at the French Open and one at the US Open), and is the most recent man to have won both the men's singles and doubles titles at the same major, which he achieved at the 1996 French Open. In 2019, Kafelnikov was inducted into the International Tennis Hall of Fame.

== Career ==
In his breakthrough year in 1994, Kafelnikov won three titles, reached the Hamburg Masters final and beat world top-5 players on six occasions. His ranking rose from 102 at the beginning of the year, to a year-end ranking of 11.

At the 1996 French Open, he reached his first Grand Slam semifinals, beating world No. 1, Andre Agassi, in straight sets in the quarterfinals. He also defeated three top-10 players (Michael Stich, Goran Ivanisevic and Boris Becker) on his way to the title in Milan.

At the 1996 French Open, Kafelnikov became the first Russian to ever win a Grand Slam title, defeating Michael Stich in the final in straight sets, having beaten world No. 1, Pete Sampras, in the semifinals.

Kafelnikov was finalist at the 1997 ATP Tour World Championships, and won three titles during that season. In doubles, he won both the French Open and US Open partnering Daniel Vacek.

At the 1999 Australian Open, 10th seed Kafelnikov won his second singles Grand Slam title, defeating Thomas Enqvist in the final in four sets. He also won in Rotterdam and Moscow, was runner-up at the Canadian Open and reached the semifinals of the US Open.

Seeded fifth, Kafelnikov won the gold medal in the men's singles tournament at the 2000 Olympic Games, beating second seed Gustavo Kuerten in the quarterfinals and Tommy Haas in the final in five sets. He also reached the final of the Australian Open (losing to Agassi in four sets) and the quarterfinals of the French Open.

In 2001, he defeated world No. 1 Gustavo Kuerten in the quarterfinals of the US Open for the loss of just seven games, before losing to Lleyton Hewitt in the semifinals. Kafelnikov was also a finalist at the Paris Masters, quarterfinalist at the Australian Open and French Open, and won a record fifth consecutive title in Moscow.

Kafelnikov won his fourth and final doubles Grand Slam at the French Open in 2002, partnering Paul Haarhuis, and his final career singles title, in Tashkent. He was also a member of Russia's Davis Cup-winning team in 2002.

Kafelnikov played his last ATP Tour match in October 2003 (in St Petersburg). In total, he won 53 titles across singles and doubles during his career, and he remains the last male player to win both singles and doubles titles at the same grand slam.

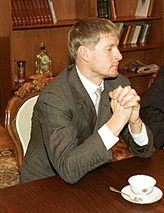
Kafelnikov in the Kremlin, 2002

== Post-retirement ==
Since retiring from tennis, Kafelnikov cashed three times at the 2005 World Series of Poker. He also played golf on the European Tour at the 2005, 2008, 2013, 2014 and 2015 Russian Open, 2012, 2013 and 2014 Austrian Open, and the 2014 Czech Masters, plus several Challenge Tour events, without making any cuts. During the 2008 Miami Masters, Kafelnikov coached Marat Safin (in the absence of Safin's usual coach, Hernán Gumy). In 2009 and 2010, he participated in the ATP Champions Tour (for retired ATP-professional tennis players), finishing in third place in tournaments in Chengdu, Bogotá and São Paulo.

Kafelnikov was inducted into the International Tennis Hall of Fame in 2019, not counting enough votes in his previous nominations in 2012 (compared to Gustavo Kuerten and Jennifer Capriati), in 2015 (compared to David Hall and Amélie Mauresmo), and in 2018 (compared to Michael Stich and Helena Suková). In May 2017, Kafelnikov was extensively interviewed by the most popular Russian website Sports.ru considering his current political preferences. In August 2020, Kafelnikov announced his plans to settle in [Western / old] Europe.

In March 2021, Kafelnikov faced another wave of rumors about his retirement in 2003 as really being caused by ATP's desire to avoid a betting scandal considering his match in Lyon against Fernando Vicente. Russian volleyball player Aleksey Spiridonov said in an interview: "Kafelnikov is corrupt. He made bets against himself during his career. And then he finished abruptly when being grabbed by the ass. I know. My friends work in the offices. And someone in an interview also said that Kafelnikov offered him to bet against himself and lose the match. Who pinned him down? There was no [powerful] tennis federation back then. I think, the gangsters". One week after his match in 2003, Kafelnikov said about the accusations: "This is a complete bullshit, but now in the locker room, they [players] look at me like at an enemy of the people. Even in my country where I have always been a role model they [people] have begun to look at me that way. I talked to Fernando and he said his mother was crying on the phone because of this. Those who made this mess should be punished. The article says Kafelnikov has been involved in match-fixing and it rips me to pieces. I do not want to be associated with betting in any way".

To a lesser extent, the player has been commemorated for his outspoken jealousy towards the much more impressive incomes of golf players in general, if compared to his colleagues in tennis. Lindsay Davenport correspondingly voiced some support for Kafelnikov's claim who was also worried "it would be a shame to see the public lose sympathy in me just because I am making such a statement". In January 2001, during the 2001 Australian Open, he concluded: "If you look at the golfers, we are taking an extreme example now, of course, the golfers make $540,000 a week to the winner. And this is the lowest tournament that they have on the U.S. Tour. If you look at the tennis players, to win a tournament, win five matches [at the] absolutely lowest level tournament you make only $42,000. I think it is quite bizarre to see that kind of money in a tennis game."

Amidst the 2018 Russian Elections, it was reported that he chose not to take part in the voting leading up to the election, due to the absence of Alexei Navalny on the ballot. "My choice, who I was willing to give my voice to at the election, he [Navalny] was not allowed to run for the presidency." He also shared how he has spoken with other athletes who don't talk about Russian politics openly with others. Per the article, "he [Kafelnikov] is in contact with other opposition-minded athletes who don't talk politics openly."

== Significant finals ==
=== Grand Slam tournaments ===
==== Singles: 3 (2–1) ====
Result	Year	Championship	Surface	Opponent	Score
Win	1996	French Open	Clay	(Germany) Michael Stich	7–6^{(7–4)}, 7–5, 7–6^{(7–4)}
Win	1999	Australian Open	Hard	(Sweden) Thomas Enqvist	4–6, 6–0, 6–3, 7–6^{(7–1)}
Loss	2000	Australian Open	Hard	(United States) Andre Agassi	6–3, 3–6, 2–6, 4–6

==== Doubles: 5 (4–1) ====
Result	Year	Championship	Surface	Partner	Opponents	Score
Win	1996	French Open	Clay	(Czech Republic) Daniel Vacek	(Switzerland) Jakob Hlasek (France) Guy Forget	6–2, 6–3
Win	1997	French Open	Clay	(Czech Republic) Daniel Vacek	(Australia) Todd Woodbridge (Australia) Mark Woodforde	7–6^{(7–1)}, 4–6, 6–3
Win	1997	US Open	Hard	(Czech Republic) Daniel Vacek	(Sweden) Jonas Björkman (Sweden) Nicklas Kulti	7–6^{(10–8)}, 6–3
Win	2002	French Open	Clay	(Netherlands) Paul Haarhuis	(The Bahamas) Mark Knowles (Canada) Daniel Nestor	7–5, 6–4
Loss	2003	French Open	Clay	(Netherlands) Paul Haarhuis	(United States) Bob Bryan (United States) Mike Bryan	6–7^{(3–7)}, 3–6

=== Olympic Games ===
==== Singles: 1 (gold medal) ====
Result	Year	Location	Surface	Opponent	Score
Win	2000	Sydney Olympics	Hard	(Germany) Tommy Haas	7–6^{(7–4)}, 3–6, 6–2, 4–6, 6–3

=== Year-end championships ===
==== Singles: 1 (0–1) ====
Result	Year	Championship	Surface	Opponent	Score
Loss	1997	ATP Tour World Championships	Hard (i)	(United States) Pete Sampras	3–6, 2–6, 2–6

=== Masters 1000 tournaments ===
==== Singles: 5 (0–5) ====
Result	Year	Tournament	Surface	Opponent	Score
Loss	1994	Hamburg Masters	Clay	(Ukraine) Andrei Medvedev	4–6, 4–6, 6–3, 3–6
Loss	1996	Paris Masters	Carpet (i)	(Sweden) Thomas Enqvist	2–6, 4–6, 5–7
Loss	1998	Stuttgart Masters	Hard (i)	(Netherlands) Richard Krajicek	4–6, 3–6, 3–6
Loss	1999	Canadian Open	Hard	(Sweden) Thomas Johansson	6–1, 3–6, 3–6
Loss	2001	Paris Masters	Carpet (i)	(France) Sébastien Grosjean	6–7^{(3–7)}, 1–6, 7–6^{(7–5)}, 4–6

==== Doubles: 11 (7–4) ====
Result	Year	Tournament	Surface	Partner	Opponents	Score
Loss	1994	Monte Carlo Masters	Clay	(Czech Republic) Daniel Vacek	(Sweden) Nicklas Kulti (Sweden) Magnus Larsson	6–3, 6–7, 4–6
Win	1994	Rome Masters	Clay	(Czech Republic) David Rikl	(South Africa) Wayne Ferreira (Spain) Javier Sánchez	6–1, 7–5
Win	1995	ATP German Open	Clay	(South Africa) Wayne Ferreira	(Zimbabwe) Byron Black (Russia) Andrei Olhovskiy	6–1, 7–6
Win	1995	Canadian Open	Hard	(Russia) Andrei Olhovskiy	(United States) Brian MacPhie (Australia) Sandon Stolle	6–2, 6–2
Loss	1996	Paris Masters	Carpet (i)	(Czech Republic) Daniel Vacek	(Netherlands) Jacco Eltingh (Netherlands) Paul Haarhuis	4–6, 6–4, 6–7
Win	2000	Monte Carlo Masters	Clay	(South Africa) Wayne Ferreira	(Netherlands) Paul Haarhuis (United States) Sandon Stolle	6–3, 2–6, 6–1
Loss	2000	Rome Masters	Clay	(South Africa) Wayne Ferreira	(Czech Republic) Martin Damm (Slovakia) Dominik Hrbatý	4–6, 6–4, 3–6
Win	2001	Indian Wells Masters	Hard	(South Africa) Wayne Ferreira	(Sweden) Jonas Björkman (Australia) Todd Woodbridge	6–2, 7–5
Win	2001	Rome Masters	Clay	(South Africa) Wayne Ferreira	(Canada) Daniel Nestor (Australia) Sandon Stolle	6–4, 7–6^{(8–6)}
Loss	2002	Monte Carlo Masters	Clay	(Netherlands) Paul Haarhuis	(Sweden) Jonas Björkman (Australia) Todd Woodbridge	3–6, 6–3, 7–10
Win	2003	Indian Wells Masters	Hard	(South Africa) Wayne Ferreira	(United States) Bob Bryan (United States) Mike Bryan	3–6, 7–5, 6–4

== ATP career finals ==
=== Singles: 46 (26 titles / 20 runner-ups) ===
Legend Grand Slam (2–1) Year-end championships (0–1) ATP Masters Series (0–5) ATP Championship Series (4–3) ATP International Series (19–10)	Finals by surface Hard (9–10) Grass (3–1) Clay (3–3) Carpet (11–6)

Result	W-L	Date	Tournament	Surface	Opponent	Score
Win	1–0	Jan 1994	Adelaide, Australia	Hard	(Russia) Alexander Volkov	6–4, 6–3
Win	2–0	Mar 1994	Copenhagen, Denmark	Carpet (i)	(Czech Republic) Daniel Vacek	6–3, 7–5
Loss	2–1	May 1994	Hamburg, Germany	Clay	(Ukraine) Andrei Medvedev	4–6, 4–6, 6–3, 3–6
Win	3–1	Aug 1994	Long Island, USA	Hard	(France) Cédric Pioline	5–7, 6–1, 6–2
Win	4–1	Feb 1995	Milan, Italy	Carpet (i)	(Germany) Boris Becker	7–5, 5–7, 7–6^{(8–6)}
Win	5–1	Mar 1995	St. Petersburg, Russia	Carpet (i)	(France) Guillaume Raoux	6–2, 6–2
Loss	5–2	Apr 1995	Nice, France	Clay	(Switzerland) Marc Rosset	4–6, 0–6
Win	6–2	Jul 1995	Gstaad, Switzerland	Clay	(Switzerland) Jakob Hlasek	6–3, 6–4, 3–6, 6–3
Win	7–2	Aug 1995	Long Island, USA	Hard	(Netherlands) Jan Siemerink	7–6^{(7–0)}, 6–2
Win	8–2	Jan 1996	Adelaide, Australia	Hard	(Zimbabwe) Byron Black	7–6^{(7–0)}, 3–6, 6–1
Loss	8–3	Mar 1996	Rotterdam, Netherlands	Carpet (i)	(Croatia) Goran Ivanišević	4–6, 6–3, 3–6
Loss	8–4	Apr 1996	St. Petersburg, Russia	Carpet (i)	(Sweden) Magnus Gustafsson	2–6, 6–7^{(4–7)}
Win	9–4	May 1996	Prague, Czech Republic	Clay	(Czech Republic) Bohdan Ulihrach	7–5, 1–6, 6–3
Win	10–4	Jun 1996	French Open, Paris, France	Clay	(Germany) Michael Stich	7–6^{(7–4)}, 7–5, 7–6^{(7–4)}
Loss	10–5	Jun 1996	Halle, Germany	Grass	(Sweden) Nicklas Kulti	7–6^{(7–5)}, 3–6, 4–6
Loss	10–6	Jul 1996	Stuttgart, Germany	Clay	(Austria) Thomas Muster	2–6, 2–6, 4–6
Win	11–6	Oct 1996	Lyon, France	Carpet (i)	(France) Arnaud Boetsch	7–5, 6–3
Loss	11–7	Nov 1996	Paris, France	Carpet (i)	(Sweden) Thomas Enqvist	2–6, 4–6, 5–7
Loss	11–8	Nov 1996	Moscow, Russia	Carpet (i)	(Croatia) Goran Ivanišević	6–3, 1–6, 3–6
Win	12–8	Jun 1997	Halle, Germany	Grass	(Czech Republic) Petr Korda	7–6^{(7–2)}, 6–7^{(5–7)}, 7–6^{(9–7)}
Win	13–8	Aug 1997	New Haven, USA	Hard	(Australia) Patrick Rafter	7–6^{(7–4)}, 6–4
Win	14–8	Nov 1997	Moscow, Russia	Carpet (i)	(Czech Republic) Petr Korda	7–6^{(7–2)}, 6–4
Loss	14–9	Nov 1997	Year-end championships, Hanover	Hard (i)	(United States) Pete Sampras	3–6, 2–6, 2–6
Loss	14–10	Feb 1998	Marseille, France	Hard (i)	(Sweden) Thomas Enqvist	4–6, 1–6
Win	15–10	Mar 1998	London, UK	Carpet (i)	(France) Cédric Pioline	7–5, 6–4
Win	16–10	Jun 1998	Halle, Germany	Grass	(Sweden) Magnus Larsson	6–4, 6–4
Loss	16–11	Sep 1998	Tashkent, Uzbekistan	Hard	(United Kingdom) Tim Henman	5–7, 4–6
Loss	16–12	Nov 1998	Stuttgart, Germany	Hard (i)	(Netherlands) Richard Krajicek	4–6, 3–6, 3–6
Win	17–12	Nov 1998	Moscow, Russia	Carpet (i)	(Croatia) Goran Ivanišević	7–6^{(7–2)}, 7–6^{(7–5)}
Win	18–12	Feb 1999	Australian Open, Melbourne	Hard	(Sweden) Thomas Enqvist	4–6, 6–0, 6–3, 7–6^{(7–1)}
Win	19–12	Feb 1999	Rotterdam, Netherlands	Carpet (i)	(United Kingdom) Tim Henman	6–2, 7–6^{(7–3)}
Loss	19–13	Aug 1999	Montreal, Canada	Hard	(Sweden) Thomas Johansson	6–1, 3–6, 3–6
Loss	19–14	Aug 1999	Washington D.C., USA	Hard	(United States) Andre Agassi	6–7^{(3–7)}, 1–6
Win	20–14	Nov 1999	Moscow, Russia	Carpet (i)	(Zimbabwe) Byron Black	7–6^{(7–2)}, 6–4
Loss	20–15	Jan 2000	Australian Open, Melbourne	Hard	(United States) Andre Agassi	6–3, 3–6, 2–6, 4–6
Loss	20–16	Feb 2000	London, UK	Hard (i)	(Switzerland) Marc Rosset	4–6, 4–6
Win	21–16	Oct 2000	Sydney Olympics, Australia	Hard	(Germany) Tommy Haas	7–6^{(7–4)}, 3–6, 6–2, 4–6, 6–3
Win	22–16	Oct 2000	Moscow, Russia	Carpet (i)	(Germany) David Prinosil	6–2, 7–5
Loss	22–17	Nov 2000	Stockholm, Sweden	Hard (i)	(Sweden) Thomas Johansson	2–6, 4–6, 4–6
Win	23–17	Feb 2001	Marseille, France	Hard (i)	(France) Sébastien Grosjean	7–6^{(7–5)}, 6–2
Loss	23–18	Sep 2001	Tashkent, Uzbekistan	Hard	(Russia) Marat Safin	2–6, 2–6
Win	24–18	Oct 2001	Moscow, Russia	Carpet (i)	(Germany) Nicolas Kiefer	6–4, 7–5
Loss	24–19	Nov 2001	Paris, France	Carpet (i)	(France) Sébastien Grosjean	6–7^{(3–7)}, 1–6, 7–6^{(7–5)}, 4–6
Win	25–19	Jun 2002	Halle, Germany	Grass	(Germany) Nicolas Kiefer	2–6, 6–4, 6–4
Win	26–19	Sep 2002	Tashkent, Uzbekistan	Hard	(Belarus) Vladimir Voltchkov	7–6^{(8–6)}, 7–5
Loss	26–20	Feb 2003	Milan, Italy	Carpet	(Netherlands) Martin Verkerk	4–6, 7–5, 5–7

=== Doubles: 41 (27 titles / 14 runner-ups) ===
Legend Grand Slam Tournaments (4–1) ATP Masters Series (7–4) ATP International Series Gold (6–4) ATP International Series (10–5)	Finals by surface Hard (9–1) Clay (13–5) Grass (0–2) Carpet (5–6)

Result	W-L	Date	Tournament	Surface	Partner	Opponents	Score
Loss	0–1	Feb 1994	Marseille, France	Carpet (i)	(Czech Republic) Martin Damm	(Netherlands) Jan Siemerink (Czech Republic) Daniel Vacek	7–6, 4–6, 1–6
Win	1–1	Apr 1994	Barcelona, Spain	Clay	(Czech Republic) David Rikl	(United States) Jim Courier (Spain) Javier Sánchez	5–7, 6–1, 6–4
Loss	1–2	Apr 1994	Monte Carlo, Monaco	Clay	(Czech Republic) Daniel Vacek	(Sweden) Nicklas Kulti (Sweden) Magnus Larsson	6–3, 6–7, 4–6
Win	2–2	May 1994	Munich, Germany	Clay	(Czech Republic) David Rikl	(Germany) Boris Becker (Czech Republic) Petr Korda	7–6, 7–5
Win	3–2	May 1994	Rome, Italy	Clay	(Czech Republic) David Rikl	(South Africa) Wayne Ferreira (Spain) Javier Sánchez	6–1, 7–5
Win	4–2	Oct 1994	Lyon, France	Carpet (i)	(Switzerland) Jakob Hlasek	(Czech Republic) Martin Damm (Australia) Patrick Rafter	6–7, 7–6, 7–6
Loss	4–3	Mar 1995	St. Petersburg, Russia	Carpet (i)	(Switzerland) Jakob Hlasek	(Czech Republic) Martin Damm (Sweden) Anders Järryd	4–6, 2–6
Win	5–3	Apr 1995	Estoril, Portugal	Clay	(Russia) Andrei Olhovskiy	(Germany) Marc-Kevin Goellner (Italy) Diego Nargiso	5–7, 7–5, 6–2
Win	6–3	May 1995	Hamburg, Germany	Clay	(South Africa) Wayne Ferreira	(Zimbabwe) Byron Black (Russia) Andrei Olhovskiy	6–1, 7–6
Loss	6–4	Jun 1995	Halle, Germany	Grass	(Russia) Andrei Olhovskiy	(Netherlands) Jacco Eltingh (Netherlands) Paul Haarhuis	2–6, 6–3, 3–6
Win	7–4	Jul 1995	Montreal, Canada	Hard	(Russia) Andrei Olhovskiy	(United States) Brian MacPhie (Australia) Sandon Stolle	6–2, 6–2
Win	8–4	Oct 1995	Lyon, France	Carpet (i)	(Switzerland) Jakob Hlasek	(South Africa) John-Laffnie de Jager (South Africa) Wayne Ferreira	6–3, 6–3
Loss	8–5	Feb 1996	Antwerp, Belgium	Carpet (i)	(Netherlands) Menno Oosting	(Sweden) Jonas Björkman (Sweden) Nicklas Kulti	4–6, 4–6
Win	9–5	Apr 1996	St. Petersburg, Russia	Carpet (i)	(Russia) Andrei Olhovskiy	(Sweden) Nicklas Kulti (Sweden) Peter Nyborg	6–3, 6–4
Win	10–5	May 1996	Prague, Czech Republic	Clay	(Czech Republic) Daniel Vacek	(Argentina) Luis Lobo (Spain) Javier Sánchez	6–3, 6–7, 6–3
Win	11–5	Jun 1996	French Open, Paris	Clay	(Czech Republic) Daniel Vacek	(Switzerland) Jakob Hlasek (France) Guy Forget	6–2, 6–3
Loss	11–6	Jun 1996	Halle, Germany	Grass	(Czech Republic) Daniel Vacek	(Zimbabwe) Byron Black (Canada) Grant Connell	1–6, 5–7
Win	12–6	Sep 1996	Basel, Switzerland	Hard (i)	(Czech Republic) Daniel Vacek	(South Africa) David Adams (Netherlands) Menno Oosting	6–3, 6–4
Win	13–6	Oct 1996	Vienna, Austria	Carpet (i)	(Czech Republic) Daniel Vacek	(Czech Republic) Pavel Vízner (Netherlands) Menno Oosting	7–6, 6–4
Loss	13–7	Nov 1996	Paris, France	Carpet (i)	(Czech Republic) Daniel Vacek	(Netherlands) Jacco Eltingh (Netherlands) Paul Haarhuis	4–6, 6–4, 6–7
Win	14–7	Jun 1997	French Open, Paris	Clay	(Czech Republic) Daniel Vacek	(Australia) Todd Woodbridge (Australia) Mark Woodforde	7–6, 4–6, 6–3
Win	15–7	Jul 1997	Gstaad, Switzerland	Clay	(Czech Republic) Daniel Vacek	(United States) Trevor Kronemann (Australia) David Macpherson	4–6, 7–6, 6–3
Win	16–7	Sep 1997	US Open, New York	Hard	(Czech Republic) Daniel Vacek	(Sweden) Jonas Björkman (Sweden) Nicklas Kulti	7–6, 6–3
Win	17–7	Feb 1998	Antwerp, Belgium	Hard (i)	(South Africa) Wayne Ferreira	(Spain) Tomás Carbonell (Spain) Francisco Roig	7–5, 3–6, 6–2
Loss	17–8	Mar 1998	London, England	Carpet (i)	(Czech Republic) Daniel Vacek	(Czech Republic) Martin Damm (United States) Jim Grabb	4–6, 5–7
Win	18–8	Oct 1998	Vienna, Austria	Carpet (i)	(Czech Republic) Daniel Vacek	(South Africa) David Adams (South Africa) John-Laffnie de Jager	7–5, 6–3
Loss	18–9	Nov 1998	Moscow, Russia	Carpet (i)	(Czech Republic) Daniel Vacek	(United States) Jared Palmer (United States) Jeff Tarango	4–6, 7–6, 2–6
Win	19–9	Apr 1999	Barcelona, Spain	Clay	(Netherlands) Paul Haarhuis	(Italy) Massimo Bertolini (Italy) Cristian Brandi	7–5, 6–3
Loss	19–10	Feb 2000	Rotterdam, Netherlands	Hard (i)	(United Kingdom) Tim Henman	(South Africa) David Adams (South Africa) John-Laffnie de Jager	7–5, 2–6, 3–6
Win	20–10	Apr 2000	Monte Carlo, Monaco	Clay	(South Africa) Wayne Ferreira	(Netherlands) Paul Haarhuis (Australia) Sandon Stolle	6–3, 2–6, 6–1
Loss	20–11	May 2000	Rome, Italy	Clay	(South Africa) Wayne Ferreira	(Czech Republic) Martin Damm (Slovakia) Dominik Hrbatý	4–6, 6–4, 3–6
Win	21–11	Oct 2000	Vienna, Austria	Hard (i)	(Federal Republic of Yugoslavia) Nenad Zimonjić	(Czech Republic) Jiří Novák (Czech Republic) David Rikl	6–4, 6–4
Win	22–11	Mar 2001	Indian Wells, United States	Hard	(South Africa) Wayne Ferreira	(Sweden) Jonas Björkman (Australia) Todd Woodbridge	6–2, 7–5
Win	23–11	May 2001	Rome, Italy	Clay	(South Africa) Wayne Ferreira	(Canada) Daniel Nestor (Australia) Sandon Stolle	6–4, 7–6^{(8–6)}
Win	24–11	Oct 2001	St. Petersburg, Russia	Hard (i)	(Russia) Denis Golovanov	(Georgia (country)) Irakli Labadze (Russia) Marat Safin	7–5, 6–4
Loss	24–12	Apr 2002	Monte Carlo, Monaco	Clay	(Netherlands) Paul Haarhuis	(Sweden) Jonas Björkman (Australia) Todd Woodbridge	3–6, 6–3, [7–10]
Win	25–12	Jun 2002	French Open, Paris	Clay	(Netherlands) Paul Haarhuis	(The Bahamas) Mark Knowles (Canada) Daniel Nestor	7–5, 6–4
Win	26–12	Mar 2003	Indian Wells, United States	Hard	(South Africa) Wayne Ferreira	(United States) Bob Bryan (United States) Mike Bryan	3–6, 7–5, 6–4
Loss	26–13	Jun 2003	French Open, Paris	Clay	(Netherlands) Paul Haarhuis	(United States) Bob Bryan (United States) Mike Bryan	6–7, 3–6
Loss	26–14	Jul 2003	Stuttgart, Germany	Clay	(Zimbabwe) Kevin Ullyett	(Czech Republic) Tomáš Cibulec (Czech Republic) Pavel Vízner	6–3, 3–6, 4–6
Win	27–14	Aug 2003	Washington, D.C., United States	Hard	(Armenia) Sargis Sargsian	(South Africa) Chris Haggard (Australia) Paul Hanley	7–5, 4–6, 6–2

== Performance timelines ==
Key
W	F	SF	QF	#R	RR	Q#	DNQ	A	NH

(W) winner; (F) finalist; (SF) semifinalist; (QF) quarterfinalist; (#R) rounds 4, 3, 2, 1; (RR) round-robin stage; (Q#) qualification round; (DNQ) did not qualify; (A) absent; (NH) not held; (SR) strike rate (events won / competed); (W–L) win–loss record.

=== Singles ===
Tournament	1992	1993	1994	1995	1996	1997	1998	1999	2000	2001	2002	2003	SR	W–L
Grand Slam tournaments
Australian Open	A	Q1	2R	QF	QF	A	A	W	F	QF	2R	2R	1 / 8	28–7
French Open	A	2R	3R	SF	W	QF	2R	2R	QF	QF	2R	2R	1 / 11	31–10
Wimbledon	A	A	3R	QF	1R	4R	1R	3R	2R	3R	3R	1R	0 / 10	16–10
US Open	A	A	4R	3R	A	2R	4R	SF	3R	SF	2R	3R	0 / 9	24–9
Win–loss	0–0	1–1	8–4	15–4	11–2	8–3	4–3	15–3	13–4	15–4	5–4	4–4	2 / 38	99–36
Olympic Games
Summer Olympics	A	Not Held			A	Not Held			G	Not Held			1 / 1	6–0
Year-end championships
Tennis Masters Cup	A	A	A	RR	RR	F	RR	SF	RR	SF	A	A	0 / 7	11–14
Grand Slam Cup	A	A	A	SF	SF	QF	A	QF	Not Held				0 / 4	5–4
ATP Masters Series
Indian Wells	A	Q3	A	A	A	A	2R	2R	2R	SF	QF	2R	0 / 6	9–6
Miami	A	Q2	A	A	A	A	3R	2R	4R	3R	3R	3R	0 / 6	7–6
Monte Carlo	A	A	SF	3R	2R	2R	3R	2R	2R	1R	1R	2R	0 / 10	8–10
Rome	A	A	2R	1R	3R	3R	3R	3R	2R	2R	2R	SF	0 / 10	16–10
Hamburg	A	A	F	2R	SF	SF	2R	A	1R	1R	1R	A	0 / 8	11–8
Canada	A	A	A	QF	A	SF	QF	F	QF	1R	3R	2R	0 / 8	17–8
Cincinnati	A	A	2R	2R	QF	QF	SF	SF	3R	QF	1R	2R	0 / 10	17–10
Stuttgart^{1}	Q1	2R	SF	3R	2R	3R	F	2R	SF	SF	2R	1R	0 / 11	15–11
Paris	A	Q2	3R	A	F	SF	SF	2R	3R	F	3R	A	0 / 8	17–8
Win–loss	0–0	1–1	15–6	4–6	11–6	14–7	16–9	9–8	14–9	16–9	8–9	9–7	0 / 77	117–77
Year-end ranking	275	102	11	6	3	5	11	2	5	4	27	41		

^{1}Held in Stockholm till 1994, held as Stuttgart Masters from 1995 until 2001. Held as Madrid Masters from 2002 onwards.

=== Doubles ===
Tournament	1992	1993	1994	1995	1996	1997	1998	1999	2000	2001	2002	2003	SR	W–L
Grand Slam tournaments
Australian Open	A	A	1R	QF	3R	A	A	QF	3R	3R	2R	2R	0 / 8	14–8
French Open	A	A	2R	QF	W	W	2R	QF	QF	1R	W	F	3 / 10	34–7
Wimbledon	A	A	SF	SF	3R	1R	3R	2R	A	A	3R	2R	0 / 8	17–6
US Open	A	A	1R	2R	A	W	2R	1R	SF	2R	3R	1R	1 / 9	15–8
Win–loss	0–0	0–0	5–4	11–4	10–2	12–1	4–3	7–3	9–3	3–3	11–3	8–3	4 / 35	80–29
Olympic Games
Summer Olympics	A	Not Held			A	Not Held			2R	Not Held			0 / 1	1–1
ATP Masters Series
Indian Wells	A	A	A	A	A	A	QF	1R	SF	W	1R	W	2 / 6	14–4
Miami	A	A	A	A	A	A	QF	2R	2R	A	A	1R	0 / 4	2–4
Monte Carlo	A	A	F	QF	QF	SF	1R	2R	W	1R	F	QF	1 / 10	19–9
Rome	A	A	W	A	QF	2R	QF	1R	F	W	2R	QF	2 / 9	22–7
Hamburg	A	A	A	W	1R	SF	1R	A	2R	1R	SF	A	1 / 7	10–6
Canada	A	A	A	W	A	QF	1R	1R	2R	1R	1R	1R	1 / 8	5–7
Cincinnati	A	A	1R	1R	1R	1R	SF	2R	2R	2R	1R	2R	0 / 10	6–9
Stuttgart^{1}	A	A	QF	QF	1R	1R	QF	1R	QF	QF	2R	A	0 / 9	10–8
Paris	A	A	1R	A	F	1R	2R	QF	2R	A	2R	A	0 / 7	6–7
Win–loss	0–0	0–0	11–4	11–2	6–6	6–7	10–9	3–8	16–8	13–4	9–8	9–5	7 / 70	94–61
Year-end ranking	484	156	12	9	5	6	19	46	12	28	15	17		

^{1}Held in Stockholm till 1994, held as Stuttgart Masters from 1995 until 2001. Held as Madrid Masters from 2002 onwards.

== Top 10 wins ==
Season	1992	1993	1994	1995	1996	1997	1998	1999	2000	2001	2002	2003	Total
Wins	0	2	11	6	3	6	3	7	3	3	0	2	46

#	Player	Rank	Event	Surface	Rd	Score	KR
1993
1.	(Germany) Michael Stich	10	Barcelona, Spain	Clay	3R	4–6, 6–3, 6–3	253
2.	(Germany) Michael Stich	4	Lyon, France	Carpet (i)	1R	6–3, 7–6^{(7–4)}	127
1994
3.	(Sweden) Magnus Gustafsson	10	Rotterdam, Netherlands	Carpet (i)	2R	6–1, 6–3	51
4.	(Germany) Michael Stich	2	Monte-Carlo, Monaco	Clay	3R	7–6^{(7–3)}, 6–4	41
5.	(Croatia) Goran Ivanišević	5	Hamburg, Germany	Clay	2R	7–6^{(7–1)}, 6–0	29
6.	(Germany) Michael Stich	2	Hamburg, Germany	Clay	SF	6–3, 6–4	29
7.	(United States) Jim Courier	7	Halle, Germany	Grass	QF	6–1, 6–4	19
8.	(Austria) Thomas Muster	10	Gstaad, Switzerland	Clay	QF	7–6^{(11–9)}, 3–6, 7–6^{(7–4)}	15
9.	(United States) Michael Chang	6	Long Island, United States	Hard	QF	3–6, 7–6^{(7–1)}, 6–4	14
10.	(Germany) Michael Stich	2	Davis Cup, Hamburg, Germany	Hard	RR	7–5, 6–3	12
11.	(Sweden) Stefan Edberg	5	Stockholm, Sweden	Carpet (i)	3R	7–6^{(7–4)}, 6–2	13
12.	(Spain) Sergi Bruguera	4	Stockholm, Sweden	Carpet (i)	QF	6–7^{(4–7)}, 6–4, 6–2	13
13.	(Sweden) Stefan Edberg	7	Davis Cup, Moscow, Russia	Carpet (i)	RR	4–6, 6–4, 6–0	11
1995
14.	(United States) Todd Martin	10	Australian Open, Melbourne, Australia	Hard	4R	6–1, 6–4, 6–2	12
15.	(Germany) Michael Stich	8	Milan, Italy	Carpet (i)	QF	7–6^{(7–4)}, 4–6, 6–0	10
16.	(Croatia) Goran Ivanišević	4	Milan, Italy	Carpet (i)	SF	7–5, 6–7^{(4–7)}, 6–4	10
17.	(Germany) Boris Becker	3	Milan, Italy	Carpet (i)	F	7–5, 5–7, 7–6^{(8–6)}	10
18.	(United States) Andre Agassi	1	French Open, Paris, France	Clay	QF	6–4, 6–3, 7–5	9
19.	(United States) Jim Courier	8	Davis Cup, Moscow, Russia	Clay (i)	RR	7–6^{(7–1)}, 7–5, 6–3	6
1996
20.	(United States) Pete Sampras	1	World Team Cup, Düsseldorf, Germany	Clay	RR	6–3, 6–2	7
21.	(United States) Pete Sampras	1	French Open, Paris, France	Clay	SF	7–6^{(7–4)}, 6–0, 6–2	7
22.	(Sweden) Thomas Enqvist	9	ATP Tour World Championships, Hanover, Germany	Carpet (i)	RR	6–3, 7–6^{(7–5)}	3
1997
23.	(Sweden) Thomas Enqvist	8	Montreal, Canada	Hard	QF	7–5, 6–7^{(7–9)}, 6–1	7
24.	(Spain) Sergi Bruguera	6	Grand Slam Cup, Munich, Germany	Carpet (i)	1R	6–4, 6–3	4
25.	(United Kingdom) Greg Rusedski	5	Paris, France	Carpet (i)	QF	6–4, 3–6, 6–3	6
26.	(Sweden) Jonas Björkman	4	ATP Tour World Championships, Hanover, Germany	Hard (i)	RR	6–3, 7–6^{(8–6)}	6
27.	(United States) Michael Chang	2	ATP Tour World Championships, Hanover, Germany	Hard (i)	RR	6–3, 6–0	6
28.	(Spain) Carlos Moyà	7	ATP Tour World Championships, Hanover, Germany	Hard (i)	SF	7–6^{(7–2)}, 7–6^{(7–3)}	6
1998
29.	(United Kingdom) Tim Henman	10	Paris, France	Carpet (i)	3R	6–3, 6–7^{(5–7)}, 7–6^{(7–2)}	8
30.	(Chile) Marcelo Ríos	2	Paris, France	Carpet (i)	QF	6–3, 6–2	8
31.	(Slovakia) Karol Kučera	7	ATP Tour World Championships, Hanover, Germany	Hard (i)	RR	6–7^{(3–7)}, 6–3, 6–2	10
1999
32.	(United Kingdom) Greg Rusedski	9	Rotterdam, Netherlands	Carpet (i)	SF	6–4, 6–2	2
33.	(United Kingdom) Tim Henman	7	Rotterdam, Netherlands	Carpet (i)	F	6–2, 7–6^{(7–3)}	2
34.	(United States) Todd Martin	9	Montreal, Canada	Hard	QF	7–6^{(10–8)}, 6–7^{(3–7)}, 6–4	4
35.	(United States) Andre Agassi	3	Montreal, Canada	Hard	SF	6–1, 6–4	4
36.	(United Kingdom) Tim Henman	5	Cincinnati, United States	Hard	QF	7–5, 7–5	2
37.	(United States) Todd Martin	7	ATP Tour World Championships, Hanover, Germany	Hard (i)	RR	6–4, 1–6, 6–1	2
38.	(Sweden) Thomas Enqvist	4	ATP Tour World Championships, Hanover, Germany	Hard (i)	RR	7–5, 3–6, 6–4	2
2000
39.	(Australia) Lleyton Hewitt	9	World Team Cup, Düsseldorf, Germany	Clay	RR	6–1, 6–2	4
40.	(Brazil) Gustavo Kuerten	3	Summer Olympics, Sydney, Australia	Hard	QF	6–4, 7–5	8
41.	(Sweden) Magnus Norman	4	Tennis Masters Cup, Lisbon, Portugal	Hard (i)	RR	4–6, 7–5, 6–1	5
2001
42.	(Brazil) Gustavo Kuerten	1	US Open, New York, United States	Hard	QF	6–4, 6–0, 6–3	7
43.	(Spain) Juan Carlos Ferrero	4	Tennis Masters Cup, Sydney, Australia	Hard (i)	RR	4–6, 6–1, 7–6^{(7–5)}	6
44.	(Brazil) Gustavo Kuerten	1	Tennis Masters Cup, Sydney, Australia	Hard (i)	RR	6–2, 4–6, 6–3	6
2003
45.	(Russia) Marat Safin	7	Rotterdam, Netherlands	Hard (i)	2R	4–6, 7–6^{(7–5)}, 6–4	25
46.	(Spain) Carlos Moyá	4	Rome, Italy	Clay	3R	6–4, 7–6^{(7–4)}	24

== Team titles ==
2002 – Davis Cup winner with Russia

2000, 2001, 2002 - World Team Cup finalist with Russia

== Tennis records ==
- He played exclusively with and endorsed racquets from Austrian company Fischer throughout his career.
- In the episode of Sports Night "Shane", Dan and Jeremy spend over an hour recording and rerecording a ten-second commercial voiceover because Dan cannot say Yevgeny Kafelnikov.
- Kafelnikov is the only male player in the open era to have won two or more Grand Slam singles titles without also winning a Masters Series title, despite having reached five Masters Series finals.
- He won the Kremlin Cup in Moscow for a record five consecutive times from 1997 to 2001.

== Other interests ==
- Kafelnikov is an avid supporter of Spartak Moscow FC.
- Kafelnikov is a professional golfer, he has won the Russian Amateur Open Championship of Golf in 2011. Note that this national tournament should not be confused with the Russian Open tournament that wasn't held that year.
- Kafelnikov starred in Virtua Tennis, an arcade tennis game.

== Awards ==
1994–1999, 2001
The Russian Cup in the nomination Male Player of the Year
2000
The Russian Cup in the nomination Male Player of the Century
2002
The Russian Cup in the nomination Team of the Year (with M. Safin, M. Youzhny, S. Leonyuk, B. Sobkin, A. Cherkasov, V. Okhapkin, S. Yasnitsky, A. Glebov)

== See also ==
- Match fixing in tennis

Sporting positions
Preceded by Pete Sampras	World No. 1 May 3, 1999 - June 13, 1999	Succeeded by Pete Sampras
Awards and achievements
Preceded by Todd Martin	ATP Most Improved Player; 1994	Succeeded by Thomas Enqvist
Preceded by Andre Agassi	Olympic Tennis Champion; 2000	Succeeded by Nicolás Massú
