= 1990 Australian Men's Hardcourt Championships – Doubles =

Doubles
- 1990 Australian Men's Hardcourt Championships

Final
- Champions: (United Kingdom) Andrew Castle (Nigeria) Nduka Odizor
- Runners-up: (West Germany) Alexander Mronz (Netherlands) Michiel Schapers
- Score: 7–6, 6–2

Details
- Draw: 16
- Seeds: 4

Events
Singles	Doubles
← 1989 ·	Australian Men's Hardcourt Championships	· 1991 →

Neil Broad and Stefan Kruger were the defending champions but did not compete that year.

Andrew Castle and Nduka Odizor won in the final 7–6, 6–2 against Alexander Mronz and Michiel Schapers.

== Seeds ==
1. (Netherlands) Tom Nijssen / (Australia) Mark Woodforde (quarterfinals)
2. (Socialist Federal Republic of Yugoslavia) Goran Ivanišević / (Czechoslovakia) Petr Korda (quarterfinals)
3. (United States) Paul Annacone / (United States) Shelby Cannon (semifinals)
4. (West Germany) Udo Riglewski / (West Germany) Michael Stich (quarterfinals)

== Draw ==
=== Key ===
- Q = Qualifier
- WC = Wild card
- LL = Lucky loser
- Alt = Alternate
- SE = Special exempt
- PR = Protected ranking
- ITF = ITF entry
- JE = Junior exempt
- w/o = Walkover
- r = Retired
- d = Defaulted
- SR = Special ranking

First round
1	(Netherlands) T Nijssen (Australia) M Woodforde	7	7
(Australia) P Carter (Australia) J Fitzgerald	6	5
(Sweden) N Kulti (Sweden) M Larsson	4	4
(United Kingdom) A Castle (Nigeria) N Odizor	6	6
3	(United States) P Annacone (United States) S Cannon	7	6
(West Germany) P Kühnen (Mexico) L Lavalle	5	4
(Venezuela) A Mora (United States) J Schor	6	6	2
(Netherlands) P Haarhuis (Netherlands) M Koevermans	4	7	6
(Australia) B Dyke (Australia) S Youl	6	2
Q	(West Germany) A Mronz (Netherlands) M Schapers	7	6
(South Africa) G Muller (United States) S Warner	6	4
4	(West Germany) U Riglewski (West Germany) M Stich	7	6
(France) G Forget (France) E Winogradsky	6	6	6
(Sweden) R Båthman (Sweden) P Henricsson	7	3	4
(France) J-P Fleurian (France) C Pioline	1	4
2	(Socialist Federal Republic of Yugoslavia) G Ivanišević (Czechoslovakia) P Korda	6	6

Quarterfinals
1	(Netherlands) T Nijssen (Australia) M Woodforde	6	3
(United Kingdom) A Castle (Nigeria) N Odizor	7	6
3	(United States) P Annacone (United States) S Cannon	6	7
(Netherlands) P Haarhuis (Netherlands) M Koevermans	4	6
Q	(West Germany) A Mronz (Netherlands) M Schapers	6	4	7
4	(West Germany) U Riglewski (West Germany) M Stich	3	6	6
(France) G Forget (France) E Winogradsky	7	6
2	(Socialist Federal Republic of Yugoslavia) G Ivanišević (Czechoslovakia) P Korda	6	4

Semifinals
(United Kingdom) A Castle (Nigeria) N Odizor	6	7
3	(United States) P Annacone (United States) S Cannon	4	6
Q	(West Germany) A Mronz (Netherlands) M Schapers	7	6
(France) G Forget (France) E Winogradsky	6	4

Final
(United Kingdom) A Castle (Nigeria) N Odizor	7	6
Q	(West Germany) A Mronz (Netherlands) M Schapers	6	2
