= 1994 Australian Men's Hardcourt Championships – Singles =

Singles
- 1994 Australian Men's Hardcourt Championships

Final
- Champion: (Russia) Yevgeny Kafelnikov
- Runner-up: (Russia) Alexander Volkov
- Score: 6–4, 6–3

Details
- Draw: 32
- Seeds: 8

Events
Singles	Doubles
← 1993 ·	Australian Men's Hardcourt Championships	· 1995 →

Unseeded Yevgeny Kafelnikov defeated fourth-seeded Alexander Volkov 6–4, 6–3 to secure the singles title.

== Seeds ==
1. (Austria) Thomas Muster (second round)
2. (Switzerland) Marc Rosset (first round)
3. (Czech Republic) Karel Nováček (second round)
4. (Russia) Alexander Volkov (final)
5. (Israel) Amos Mansdorf (first round)
6. (Russia) Andrei Chesnokov (first round)
7. (Australia) Richard Fromberg (second round)
8. (New Zealand) Brett Steven (second round)

== Draw ==
=== Key ===
- Q = Qualifier
- WC = Wild card
- LL = Lucky loser
- Alt = Alternate
- SE = Special exempt
- PR = Protected ranking
- ITF = ITF entry
- JE = Junior exempt
- w/o = Walkover
- r = Retired
- d = Defaulted
- SR = Special ranking

=== Finals ===
Semifinals
(Australia) Patrick Rafter	1	5
(Russia) Yevgeny Kafelnikov	6	7
4	(Russia) Alexander Volkov	4	6	6
(Sweden) Nicklas Kulti	6	3	3

Final
(Russia) Yevgeny Kafelnikov	6	6
4	(Russia) Alexander Volkov	4	3

=== Section 1 ===
First round
1	(Austria) T Muster	6	6
(United States) B Shelton	2	2
(South Africa) G Stafford	6	4	6
WC	(Australia) D Cahill	3	6	2
(Czech Republic) M Damm	4	3
(Australia) P Rafter	6	6
(Zimbabwe) B Black	3	2
8	(New Zealand) B Steven	6	6
3	(Czech Republic) K Nováček	6	6
Q	(South Africa) D Adams	4	2
WC	(Australia) P Cash	6	1	3
(Russia) Y Kafelnikov	4	6	6
LL	(South Africa) D Nainkin	7^{7}	3	4
(Australia) J Morgan	6^{3}	6	6
(Czech Republic) D Rikl	6	6
5	(Israel) A Mansdorf	4	4

Second round
1	(Austria) T Muster	6^{3}	6	4
(South Africa) G Stafford	7^{7}	4	6
(Australia) P Rafter	4	6	7^{7}
8	(New Zealand) B Steven	6	2	6^{2}
3	(Czech Republic) K Nováček	4	1
(Russia) Y Kafelnikov	6	6
(Australia) J Morgan	4	2
(Czech Republic) D Rikl	6	6

Quarterfinals
(South Africa) G Stafford	6	3	7^{7}
(Australia) P Rafter	3	6	6^{5}
(Russia) Y Kafelnikov	5	6	7
(Czech Republic) D Rikl	7	3	5

Semifinals
(Australia) P Rafter	1	5
(Russia) Y Kafelnikov	6	7

=== Section 2 ===
First round
6	(Russia) A Chesnokov	2	5
Q	(Sweden) J Apell	6	7
Q	(Canada) S Lareau	2	6^{2}
(Denmark) K Carlsen	6	7^{7}
(Sweden) C Bergström	6	6
(Italy) A Gaudenzi	1	4
(France) R Gilbert	4	2
4	(Russia) A Volkov	6	6
7	(Australia) R Fromberg	6	4	6
WC	(Sweden) M Wilander	3	6	2
(Sweden) T Enqvist	3	6^{6}
(France) G Raoux	6	7^{8}
Q	(Australia) P Tramacchi	4	4
(Canada) G Rusedski	6	6
(Sweden) N Kulti	7^{7}	6
2	(Switzerland) M Rosset	6^{4}	3

Second round
Q	(Sweden) J Apell	3	6	3
(Denmark) K Carlsen	6	3	6
(Sweden) C Bergström	3	6	4
4	(Russia) A Volkov	6	3	6
7	(Australia) R Fromberg	7^{7}	3	4
(France) G Raoux	6^{5}	6	6
(Canada) G Rusedski	6^{2}	3
(Sweden) N Kulti	7^{7}	6

Quarterfinals
(Denmark) K Carlsen	5	0
4	(Russia) A Volkov	7	6
(France) G Raoux	6^{5}	3
(Sweden) N Kulti	7^{7}	6

Semifinals
4	(Russia) A Volkov	4	6	6
(Sweden) N Kulti	6	3	3
