= 1998 Australian Men's Hardcourt Championships – Doubles =

Doubles
- 1998 Australian Men's Hardcourt Championships

Final
- Champions: (Australia) Joshua Eagle (Australia) Andrew Florent
- Runners-up: (South Africa) Ellis Ferreira (United States) Rick Leach
- Score: 6–4, 6–7, 6–3

Events
Singles	Doubles
← 1997 ·	Australian Men's Hardcourt Championships	· 1999 →

Patrick Rafter and Bryan Shelton were the defending champions, but did not participate this year.

Joshua Eagle and Andrew Florent won the title, defeating Ellis Ferreira and Rick Leach 6–4, 6–7, 6–3 in the final.

== Seeds ==
Champion seeds are indicated in bold text while text in italics indicates the round in which those seeds were eliminated.

1. (Australia) Todd Woodbridge / (Australia) Mark Woodforde (quarterfinals)
2. (South Africa) Ellis Ferreira / (United States) Rick Leach (final)
3. (United Kingdom) Neil Broad / (South Africa) Piet Norval (first round)
4. (United States) Patrick Galbraith / (New Zealand) Brett Steven (quarterfinals)

== Draw ==
=== Key ===
- Q = Qualifier
- WC = Wild card
- LL = Lucky loser
- Alt = Alternate
- SE = Special exempt
- PR = Protected ranking
- ITF = ITF entry
- JE = Junior exempt
- w/o = Walkover
- r = Retired
- d = Defaulted
- SR = Special ranking

=== Finals ===
First round
1	**(Australia) T Woodbridge** **(Australia) M Woodforde**	**7**	**6**
(South Africa) D Adams (North Macedonia) A Kitinov	6	4
**(Australia) J Eagle** **(Australia) A Florent**	**6**	**6**
(United States) D Randall (United States) J Waite	3	4
3	(United Kingdom) N Broad (South Africa) P Norval	4	2
**(Zimbabwe) B Black** **(Sweden) N Kulti**	**6**	**6**
(Sweden) J Apell (Sweden) J Björkman	**6**	4	4
**(Australia) S Stolle** **(Czech Republic) C Suk**	2	**6**	**6**
WC	(Australia) L Hewitt (Australia) L Smith	1	3
**(Zimbabwe) W Black** **(Australia) A Kratzmann**	**6**	**6**
Q	(Czech Republic) M Damm (Czech Republic) S Doseděl	5	**7**	6
4	**(United States) P Galbraith** **(New Zealand) B Steven**	**7**	5	**7**
(Brazil) G Kuerten (Germany) D Prinosil	3	4
WC	**(Australia) S Draper** **(Australia) J Stoltenberg**	**6**	**6**
WC	(Australia) W Arthurs (Australia) R Fromberg	3	4
2	**(South Africa) E Ferreira** **(United States) R Leach**	**6**	**6**

Quarterfinals
1	(Australia) T Woodbridge (Australia) M Woodforde	3	**7**	6
**(Australia) J Eagle** **(Australia) A Florent**	**6**	6	**7**
**(Zimbabwe) B Black** **(Sweden) N Kulti**	**6**	**6**
(Australia) S Stolle (Czech Republic) C Suk	4	0
**(Zimbabwe) W Black** **(Australia) A Kratzmann**	**6**	**6**
4	(United States) P Galbraith (New Zealand) B Steven	4	3
WC	(Australia) S Draper (Australia) J Stoltenberg	4	5
2	**(South Africa) E Ferreira** **(United States) R Leach**	**6**	**7**

Semifinals
**(Australia) J Eagle** **(Australia) A Florent**	**6**	**7**
(Zimbabwe) B Black (Sweden) N Kulti	3	6
(Zimbabwe) W Black (Australia) A Kratzmann	2	1
2	**(South Africa) E Ferreira** **(United States) R Leach**	**6**	**6**

Final
**(Australia) J Eagle** **(Australia) A Florent**	**6**	6	**6**
2	(South Africa) E Ferreira (United States) R Leach	4	**7**	3
