= 1995 Australian Men's Hardcourt Championships – Singles =

Singles
- 1995 Australian Men's Hardcourt Championships

Final
- Champion: (United States) Jim Courier
- Runner-up: (France) Arnaud Boetsch
- Score: 6–2, 7–5

Details
- Draw: 32
- Seeds: 8

Events
Singles	Doubles
← 1994 ·	Australian Men's Hardcourt Championships	· 1996 →

Jim Courier defeated Arnaud Boetsch 6–2, 7–5 to secure the title.

== Seeds ==
1. (Russia) Yevgeny Kafelnikov (quarterfinals)
2. (South Africa) Wayne Ferreira (first round)
3. (United States) Jim Courier (champion)
4. (Netherlands) Richard Krajicek (semifinals)
5. (Australia) Patrick Rafter (quarterfinals)
6. (Australia) Jason Stoltenberg (second round)
7. (Italy) Renzo Furlan (second round)
8. (Australia) Mark Woodforde (semifinals)

== Draw ==
=== Key ===
- Q = Qualifier
- WC = Wild card
- LL = Lucky loser
- Alt = Alternate
- SE = Special exempt
- PR = Protected ranking
- ITF = ITF entry
- JE = Junior exempt
- w/o = Walkover
- r = Retired
- d = Defaulted
- SR = Special ranking

=== Finals ===
Semifinals
8	(Australia) Mark Woodforde	3	4
WC/3	(United States) Jim Courier	6	6
4	(Netherlands) Richard Krajicek	6^{4}	2
(France) Arnaud Boetsch	7^{7}	6

Final
WC/3	(United States) Jim Courier	6	7
(France) Arnaud Boetsch	2	5

=== Section 1 ===
First round
1	(Russia) Y Kafelnikov	7^{7}	6
(South Africa) M Ondruska	6^{5}	1
(Sweden) H Holm	6	6
(France) C Pioline	2	2
(Germany) J Renzenbrink	4	6	4
(United Kingdom) J Bates	6	4	6
(Germany) M Goellner	4	4
8	(Australia) M Woodforde	6	6
WC/3	(United States) J Courier	7^{7}	6
Q	(Switzerland) J Hlasek	6^{2}	1
(United States) A O'Brien	4	7	4
(Czech Republic) D Vacek	6	5	6
Q	(South Africa) D Adams	4	3
(Sweden) T Enqvist	6	6
Q	(Sweden) N Kulti	5	3
6	(Australia) J Stoltenberg	7	6

Second round
1	(Russia) Y Kafelnikov	7	6
(Sweden) H Holm	5	3
(United Kingdom) J Bates	6^{6}	4
8	(Australia) M Woodforde	7^{8}	6
WC/3	(United States) J Courier	6	6
(Czech Republic) D Vacek	3	4
(Sweden) T Enqvist	6	6
6	(Australia) J Stoltenberg	4	4

Quarterfinals
1	(Russia) Y Kafelnikov	3	5
8	(Australia) M Woodforde	6	7
WC/3	(United States) J Courier	6	6
(Sweden) T Enqvist	2	4

Semifinals
8	(Australia) M Woodforde	3	4
WC/3	(United States) J Courier	6	6

=== Section 2 ===
First round
5	(Australia) P Rafter	7^{7}	6
(Australia) T Woodbridge	6^{3}	1
(Zimbabwe) B Black	6	2	3
WC	(Australia) J Morgan	4	6	6
(Australia) R Fromberg	6	6
(United States) J Stark	4	2
(France) F Santoro	3	3
4	(Netherlands) R Krajicek	6	6
7	(Italy) R Furlan	6	6
(Italy) G Pozzi	3	4
(France) A Boetsch	4	7	7^{7}
Q	(United States) B Shelton	6	5	6^{2}
(Germany) C Steeb	6	7^{7}
WC	(Australia) W Masur	4	6^{5}
(Germany) H Dreekmann	7^{8}	6
2	(South Africa) W Ferreira	6^{6}	2

Second round
5	(Australia) P Rafter	7^{7}	6
WC	(Australia) J Morgan	6^{2}	3
(Australia) R Fromberg	5	5
4	(Netherlands) R Krajicek	7	7
7	(Italy) R Furlan	3	5
(France) A Boetsch	6	7
(Germany) C Steeb	6^{2}	6	2
(Germany) H Dreekmann	7^{7}	3	6

Quarterfinals
5	(Australia) P Rafter	4	6^{4}
4	(Netherlands) R Krajicek	6	7^{7}
(France) A Boetsch	6	6
(Germany) H Dreekmann	3	4

Semifinals
4	(Netherlands) R Krajicek	6^{4}	2
(France) A Boetsch	7^{7}	6
