= 1993 Australian Men's Hardcourt Championships – Doubles =

Doubles
- 1993 Australian Men's Hardcourt Championships

Final
- Champions: (Australia) Todd Woodbridge (Australia) Mark Woodforde
- Runners-up: (Australia) John Fitzgerald (Australia) Laurie Warder
- Score: 6–4, 7–5

Events
Singles	Doubles
← 1992 ·	Australian Men's Hardcourt Championships	· 1994 →

Goran Ivanišević and Marc Rosset were the defending champions, but did not participate in 1993.

Todd Woodbridge and Mark Woodforde won the title, defeating John Fitzgerald and Laurie Warder 6–4, 7–5 in the final.

== Seeds ==
1. (Australia) Todd Woodbridge / (Australia) Mark Woodforde (champions)
2. (Australia) John Fitzgerald / (Australia) Laurie Warder (final)
3. (South Africa) David Adams / (United States) Jonathan Stark (first round)
4. (United States) Mike Briggs / (United States) Trevor Kronemann (quarterfinals)

== Draw ==
=== Key ===
- Q = Qualifier
- WC = Wild card
- LL = Lucky loser
- Alt = Alternate
- SE = Special exempt
- PR = Protected ranking
- ITF = ITF entry
- JE = Junior exempt
- w/o = Walkover
- r = Retired
- d = Defaulted
- SR = Special ranking

=== Draw ===
First round
1	(Australia) T Woodbridge (Australia) M Woodforde	7	6
(Australia) D Macpherson (United States) B Shelton	6	3
(Netherlands) R Krajicek (United States) D Wheaton	6	6	6
(Australia) N Borwick (Australia) C Limberger	1	7	3
3	(South Africa) D Adams (United States) J Stark	5	4
(South Africa) S Kruger (South Africa) M Ondruska	7	6
(Australia) S Stolle (Australia) J Stoltenberg	7	1	2
(United States) M Bauer (United States) A O'Brien	6	6	6
WC	(Australia) G Doyle (Australia) J Eagle	6	6
(United States) M Keil (United States) D Randall	1	2
(Australia) B Dyke (Australia) R Rasheed	3	4
4	(United States) M Briggs (United States) T Kronemann	6	6
(Canada) G Michibata (United States) D Pate	6	6
Q	(Sweden) M Renström (Sweden) L-A Wahlgren	1	4
WC	(Australia) R Fromberg (Australia) J Morgan	6	5
2	(Australia) J Fitzgerald (Australia) L Warder	7	7

Quarterfinals
1	(Australia) T Woodbridge (Australia) M Woodforde	7	4	6
(Netherlands) R Krajicek (United States) D Wheaton	6	6	3
(South Africa) S Kruger (South Africa) M Ondruska	6	6
(United States) M Bauer (United States) A O'Brien	4	4
WC	(Australia) G Doyle (Australia) J Eagle	6	6
4	(United States) M Briggs (United States) T Kronemann	4	4
(Canada) G Michibata (United States) D Pate	6	6
2	(Australia) J Fitzgerald (Australia) L Warder	7	7

Semifinals
1	(Australia) T Woodbridge (Australia) M Woodforde	6	6
(South Africa) S Kruger (South Africa) M Ondruska	4	1
WC	(Australia) G Doyle (Australia) J Eagle	3	2
2	(Australia) J Fitzgerald (Australia) L Warder	6	6

Final
1	(Australia) T Woodbridge (Australia) M Woodforde	6	7
2	(Australia) J Fitzgerald (Australia) L Warder	4	5
