= 1998 Australian Men's Hardcourt Championships – Singles =

Singles
- 1998 Australian Men's Hardcourt Championships

Final
- Champion: (Australia) Lleyton Hewitt
- Runner-up: (Australia) Jason Stoltenberg
- Score: 3–6, 6–3, 7–6^{(7–4)}

Details
- Draw: 32
- Seeds: 8

Events
Singles	Doubles
- Australian Men's Hardcourt Championships

Todd Woodbridge was the defending champion, but lost to Jason Stoltenberg in the semifinals.

Sixteen-year old wild card and Adelaide native Lleyton Hewitt won his first ATP title defeated Stoltenberg in the final, 3–6, 6–3, 7–6^{(7–4)}. Stoltenberg would go on to coach Hewitt, beginning in 2001.

== Seeds ==
Champion seeds are indicated in bold text while text in italics indicates the round in which those seeds were eliminated.

1. (Sweden) Jonas Björkman (second round)
2. (Brazil) Gustavo Kuerten (second round)
3. (United States) Jim Courier (first round)
4. (Sweden) Magnus Norman (second round)
5. (Australia) Todd Woodbridge (semifinals)
6. (Germany) Nicolas Kiefer (first round)
7. (Sweden) Thomas Johansson (second round)
8. (Slovakia) Dominik Hrbatý (first round)

== Draw ==
Key

- Q = Qualifier
- WC = Wild card
- LL = Lucky loser
- Alt = Alternate
- ITF = ITF entry
- PR = Protected ranking
- SR = Special ranking
- SE = Special exempt
- JE = Junior exempt
- JR = Junior Accelerator Programme entrant
- CO = College Accelerator Programme entrant
- NG = Next Gen Accelerator Program entrant
- w/o = Walkover
- r = Retired
- d = Defaulted

=== Finals ===
Semifinals
(Australia) **Jason Stoltenberg**	**6**	**6**
5	(Australia) Todd Woodbridge	4	1
WC	(Australia) **Lleyton Hewitt**	**7^{7}**	**7^{7}**
WC	(United States) Andre Agassi	6^{5}	6^{4}

Final
(Australia) Jason Stoltenberg	**6**	3	6^{4}
WC	(Australia) **Lleyton Hewitt**	3	**6**	**7^{7}**

=== Section 1 ===
First round
1	(Sweden) **J Björkman**	**6**	**6**
(South Africa) G Stafford	4	2
(Australia) **J Stoltenberg**	**6**	**6**
(Spain) J Marín	4	1
Q	(France) **N Escudé**	**6**	**7**
(Germany) Rădulescu	0	5
(Zimbabwe) B Black	5	3
7	(Sweden) **T Johansson**	**7**	**6**
4	(Sweden) **M Norman**	**6**	1	**6**
(Norway) C Ruud	3	**6**	4
Q	(France) **J Golmard**	**6**	**6**
Q	(Germany) D Dier	3	4
(Australia) R Fromberg	**6**	3	5
Q	(Germany) **J Knippschild**	3	**6**	**7**
(Czech Republic) M Damm	5	**6**	3
5	(Australia) **T Woodbridge**	**7**	4	**6**

Second round
1	(Sweden) J Björkman	5	1
(Australia) **J Stoltenberg**	**7**	**6**
Q	(France) **N Escudé**	4	**6**	**6**
7	(Sweden) T Johansson	**6**	4	4
4	(Sweden) M Norman	**6**	2	1^{r}
Q	(France) **J Golmard**	1	**6**	0
Q	(Germany) J Knippschild	**7^{10}**	2	4
5	(Australia) **T Woodbridge**	6^{8}	**6**	**6**

Quarterfinals
(Australia) **J Stoltenberg**	6^{3}	**6**	**7**
Q	(France) N Escudé	**7^{7}**	1	5
Q	(France) J Golmard	**6**	4	4
5	(Australia) **T Woodbridge**	2	**6**	**6**

Semifinals
(Australia) **J Stoltenberg**	**6**	**6**
5	(Australia) T Woodbridge	4	1

=== Section 2 ===
First round
6	(Germany) N Kiefer	3	**6**	4
(United States) **V Spadea**	**6**	4	**6**
(Czech Republic) **S Doseděl**	4	**6**	**6**
(Italy) A Gaudenzi	**6**	2	1
(Australia) S Draper	4	4
WC	(Australia) **L Hewitt**	**6**	**6**
(Australia) **M Woodforde**	**7**	**6**
3	(United States) J Courier	5	3
8	(Slovakia) D Hrbatý	3	**7^{7}**	3
(Netherlands) **J Siemerink**	**6**	6^{5}	**6**
(Armenia) S Sargsian	**6**	3	3
WC	(United States) **A Agassi**	4	**6**	**6**
(New Zealand) **B Steven**	**6**	**6**
(France) L Roux	3	3
(Denmark) K Carlsen	6^{5}	5
WC/2	(Brazil) **G Kuerten**	**7^{7}**	**7**

Second round
(United States) **V Spadea**	**6**	**6**
(Czech Republic) S Doseděl	1	2
WC	(Australia) **L Hewitt**	4	**7^{7}**	**6**
(Australia) M Woodforde	**6**	6^{1}	1
(Netherlands) J Siemerink	4	3
WC	(United States) **A Agassi**	**6**	**6**
(New Zealand) **B Steven**	**6**	**6**
WC/2	(Brazil) G Kuerten	3	3

Quarterfinals
(United States) V Spadea	5	**6**	1
WC	(Australia) **L Hewitt**	**7**	3	**6**
WC	(United States) **A Agassi**	1	**6**	**6**
(New Zealand) B Steven	**6**	1	1

Semifinals
WC	(Australia) **L Hewitt**	**7^{7}**	**7^{7}**
WC	(United States) A Agassi	6^{5}	6^{4}

Qualifying Draw
