= 1995 Australian Men's Hardcourt Championships – Doubles =

Doubles
- 1995 Australian Men's Hardcourt Championships

Final
- Champions: (United States) Jim Courier (Australia) Patrick Rafter
- Runners-up: (Zimbabwe) Byron Black (Canada) Grant Connell
- Score: 7–6, 6–4

Details
- Draw: 16
- Seeds: 4

Events
Singles	Doubles
← 1994 ·	Australian Men's Hardcourt Championships	· 1996 →

Andrew Kratzmann and Mark Kratzmann were the defending champions, but did not participate this year.

Jim Courier and Patrick Rafter won the title, defeating Byron Black and Grant Connell 7–6, 6–4 in the final.

== Seeds ==
1. (Australia) Todd Woodbridge / (Australia) Mark Woodforde (semifinals)
2. (United States) Patrick Galbraith / (United States) Jonathan Stark (quarterfinals)
3. (Zimbabwe) Byron Black / (Canada) Grant Connell (final)
4. (South Africa) David Adams / (South Africa) Wayne Ferreira (first round)

== Draw ==
=== Key ===
- Q = Qualifier
- WC = Wild card
- LL = Lucky loser
- Alt = Alternate
- SE = Special exempt
- PR = Protected ranking
- ITF = ITF entry
- JE = Junior exempt
- w/o = Walkover
- r = Retired
- d = Defaulted
- SR = Special ranking

=== Draw ===
First round
1	(Australia) T Woodbridge (Australia) M Woodforde	6	7
Q	(South Africa) E Ferreira (United States) D Randall	3	6
WC	(Australia) J Morgan (Australia) J Stoltenberg	7	6	3
(Australia) A Florent (United States) K Kinnear	5	7	6
3	(Zimbabwe) B Black (Canada) G Connell	6	6	7
(United States) T Kronemann (Australia) D Macpherson	7	4	5
(Sweden) N Kulti (United States) B Shelton	3	6	6
(United States) B MacPhie (United States) A O'Brien	6	3	3
WC	(Australia) D Cahill (Australia) W Masur	6	6
(Australia) J Fitzgerald (Germany) M-K Goellner	4	3
(Sweden) H Holm (Canada) S Lareau	3	6	6
4	(South Africa) D Adams (South Africa) W Ferreira	6	4	3
WC	(United States) J Courier (Australia) P Rafter	6	6
(Czech Republic) C Suk (Czech Republic) D Vacek	4	3
(Switzerland) J Hlasek (Russia) Y Kafelnikov	6	4
2	(United States) P Galbraith (United States) J Stark	7	6

Quarterfinals
1	(Australia) T Woodbridge (Australia) M Woodforde	6	5	6
(Australia) A Florent (United States) K Kinnear	3	7	4
3	(Zimbabwe) B Black (Canada) G Connell	7	6
(Sweden) N Kulti (United States) B Shelton	6	4
WC	(Australia) D Cahill (Australia) W Masur	6	3	2
(Sweden) H Holm (Canada) S Lareau	3	6	6
WC	(United States) J Courier (Australia) P Rafter	6	0	7
2	(United States) P Galbraith (United States) J Stark	4	6	5

Semifinals
1	(Australia) T Woodbridge (Australia) M Woodforde	6	2
3	(Zimbabwe) B Black (Canada) G Connell	7	6
(Sweden) H Holm (Canada) S Lareau	2	3
WC	(United States) J Courier (Australia) P Rafter	6	6

Final
3	(Zimbabwe) B Black (Canada) G Connell	6	4
WC	(United States) J Courier (Australia) P Rafter	7	6
