= 1993 Australian Men's Hardcourt Championships =

- Date: 4–10 January
- Edition: 49th
- Category: World Series
- Draw: 32S / 16D
- Prize money: $157,500
- Surface: Hard / outdoor
- Location: Adelaide, Australia
- Venue: Memorial Drive

Champions

Singles
- (Sweden) Nicklas Kulti

Doubles
- (Australia) Todd Woodbridge / (Australia) Mark Woodforde
← 1992 ·	Australian Hard Court Championships	· 1994 →

The 1993 Australian Men's Hardcourt Championships was an ATP men's tennis tournament held at Memorial Drive in Adelaide, Australia from 4 January until 10 January 1993. It was played on outdoor hard courts and was part of the World Series of the 1993 ATP Tour. It was the 49th edition of the tournament. Unseeded Nicklas Kulti won the singles title.

== Finals ==
=== Singles ===
(Sweden) Nicklas Kulti defeated (Sweden) Christian Bergström 3–6, 7–5, 6–4

- It was Kulti's 1st singles title of the year and the 2nd of his career.

=== Doubles ===
(Australia) Todd Woodbridge / (Australia) Mark Woodforde defeated (Australia) John Fitzgerald / (Australia) Laurie Warder 6–4, 7–5
