= 1991 Australian Men's Hardcourt Championships =

- Date: 31 December 1990 – 6 January 1991
- Edition: 47th
- Category: World Series
- Draw: 32S / 16D
- Prize money: $150,000 (Note: Total financial commitment for the tournament was $175,000.)
- Surface: Hard / indoor
- Location: Adelaide, Australia

Champions

Singles
- (Sweden) Nicklas Kulti

Doubles
- (South Africa) Wayne Ferreira / (South Africa) Stefan Kruger
- Australian Hard Court Championships

The 1991 Australian Men's Hardcourt Championships was a men's tennis tournament played on indoor hard courts in Adelaide, Australia and was part of the ATP World Series of the 1991 ATP Tour. It was the 14th edition of the tournament and was held from 31 December 1990 until 6 January 1991. Unseeded Nicklas Kulti won the singles title.

== Finals ==
=== Singles ===
(Sweden) Nicklas Kulti defeated (Germany) Michael Stich 6–3, 1–6, 6–2

- It was Kulti's only singles title of the year and the 1st of his career.

=== Doubles ===
(South Africa) Wayne Ferreira / (South Africa) Stefan Kruger defeated (Netherlands) Paul Haarhuis / (Netherlands) Mark Koevermans 6–4, 4–6, 6–4
