= 1991 Australian Men's Hardcourt Championships – Singles =

Singles
- 1991 Australian Men's Hardcourt Championships

Final
- Champion: (Sweden) Nicklas Kulti
- Runner-up: (Germany) Michael Stich
- Score: 6–3, 1–6, 6–2

Details
- Draw: 32
- Seeds: 8

Events
Singles	Doubles
← 1990 ·	Australian Men's Hardcourt Championships	· 1992 →

Thomas Muster was the defending champion of the singles event at the Australian Men's Hardcourt Championships tennis tournament, but did not participate this year.

Nicklas Kulti defeated Michael Stich 6–3, 1–6, 6–2 to secure the title.

== Seeds ==
1. (Germany) Boris Becker (first round)
2. (United States) Jim Courier (semifinals)
3. (Austria) Horst Skoff (first round)
4. (Spain) Sergi Bruguera (first round)
5. (Sweden) Magnus Gustafsson (second round)
6. (Germany) Michael Stich (final)
7. (Netherlands) Mark Koevermans (first round)
8. (Australia) Todd Woodbridge (second round)

== Draw ==
=== Key ===
- Q = Qualifier
- WC = Wild card
- LL = Lucky loser
- Alt = Alternate
- SE = Special exempt
- PR = Protected ranking
- ITF = ITF entry
- JE = Junior exempt
- w/o = Walkover
- r = Retired
- d = Defaulted
- SR = Special ranking

=== Finals ===
Semifinals
(Sweden) Magnus Larsson	5	4
(Sweden) Nicklas Kulti	7	6
6	(Germany) Michael Stich	6	7^{8}
2	(United States) Jim Courier	4	6^{6}

Final
(Sweden) Nicklas Kulti	6	1	6
6	(Germany) Michael Stich	3	6	2

=== Top half ===
First round
1	(Germany) B Becker	4	6	6^{2}
(Sweden) M Larsson	6	3	7^{7}
(Australia) M Kratzmann	3	6	6^{6}
Q	(Socialist Federal Republic of Yugoslavia) S Živojinović	6	3	7^{8}
(Finland) V Paloheimo	0	4
(Germany) P Kühnen	6	6
(France) G Raoux	6^{2}	1
8	(Australia) T Woodbridge	7^{7}	6
4	(Spain) S Bruguera	5	3
(Germany) U Riglewski	7	6
(France) T Champion	2	3
(France) F Santoro	6	6
(Sweden) N Kulti	6	6
(Finland) A Rahunen	4	0
WC	(Australia) J Fitzgerald	2	3
5	(Sweden) M Gustafsson	6	6

Second round
(Sweden) M Larsson	7^{7}	7^{10}
Q	(Socialist Federal Republic of Yugoslavia) S Živojinović	6^{5}	6^{8}
(Germany) P Kühnen	7	6
8	(Australia) T Woodbridge	5	2
(Germany) U Riglewski	6^{4}	5
(France) F Santoro	7^{7}	7
(Sweden) N Kulti	4	6	6
5	(Sweden) M Gustafsson	6	1	1

Quarterfinals
(Sweden) M Larsson	7^{8}	3	6
(Germany) P Kühnen	6^{6}	6	3
(France) F Santoro	3	0
(Sweden) N Kulti	6	6

Semifinals
(Sweden) M Larsson	5	4
(Sweden) N Kulti	7	6

=== Bottom half ===
First round
6	(Germany) M Stich	6	6
(France) J-P Fleurian	4	4
Q	(Australia) S Stolle	7^{7}	6^{5}	4
(Israel) G Bloom	6^{4}	7^{7}	6
Q	(Netherlands) J Eltingh	3	4
WC	(Australia) J Stoltenberg	6	6
(United States) J Arias	7^{7}	3
3	(Austria) H Skoff	6^{4}	0^{r}
7	(Netherlands) M Koevermans	2	6^{2}
WC	(Australia) M Woodforde	6	7^{7}
(Germany) E Jelen	3	6^{1}
Q	(Germany) M Sinner	6	7^{7}
(Netherlands) P Haarhuis	6	3	6
(United States) B Pearce	1	6	2
(Germany) A Mronz	6	2	1
2	(United States) J Courier	3	6	6

Second round
6	(Germany) M Stich	7	6
(Israel) G Bloom	5	1
WC	(Australia) J Stoltenberg	2	4
(United States) J Arias	6	6
WC	(Australia) M Woodforde	6	3	4
Q	(Germany) M Sinner	4	6	6
(Netherlands) P Haarhuis	4	4
2	(United States) J Courier	6	6

Quarterfinals
6	(Germany) M Stich	3	6	6
(United States) J Arias	6	3	3
Q	(Germany) M Sinner	6^{3}	3
2	(United States) J Courier	7^{7}	6

Semifinals
6	(Germany) M Stich	6	7^{8}
2	(United States) J Courier	4	6^{6}
