= 1990 Australian Men's Hardcourt Championships – Singles =

Singles
- 1990 Australian Men's Hardcourt Championships

Final
- Champion: (Austria) Thomas Muster
- Runner-up: (United States) Jimmy Arias
- Score: 3–6, 6–2, 7–5

Details
- Draw: 32
- Seeds: 8

Events
Singles	Doubles
← 1989 ·	Australian Men's Hardcourt Championships	· 1991 →

Mark Woodforde was the defending champion but lost in the first round to Jimmy Arias.

Thomas Muster won in the final 3–6, 6–2, 7–5 against Arias.

== Seeds ==
1. (Spain) Sergi Bruguera (semifinals)
2. (Socialist Federal Republic of Yugoslavia) Goran Ivanišević (first round)
3. (Austria) Thomas Muster (champion)
4. (Soviet Union) Alexander Volkov (second round)
5. (United States) Paul Annacone (second round)
6. (Netherlands) Mark Koevermans (quarterfinals)
7. (Netherlands) Michiel Schapers (second round)
8. (Switzerland) Marc Rosset (second round)

== Draw ==
=== Key ===
- Q = Qualifier
- WC = Wild card
- LL = Lucky loser
- Alt = Alternate
- SE = Special exempt
- PR = Protected ranking
- ITF = ITF entry
- JE = Junior exempt
- w/o = Walkover
- r = Retired
- d = Defaulted
- SR = Special ranking

=== Finals ===
Semifinals
1	(Spain) Sergi Bruguera	6	2	6^{1}
3	(Austria) Thomas Muster	2	6	7^{7}
(United States) Jimmy Arias	6	6
(France) Jean-Philippe Fleurian	3	4

Final
3	(Austria) Thomas Muster	3	6	7
(United States) Jimmy Arias	6	2	5

=== Top half ===
First round
1	(Spain) S Bruguera	7^{7}	6
Q	(Sweden) P Henricsson	6^{4}	2
WC	(Australia) B Dyke	6	6
(South Africa) G Muller	4	4
(West Germany) M Stich	6	6
(Sweden) N Kroon	4	3
(Czechoslovakia) P Korda	3	4
7	(Netherlands) M Schapers	6	6
3	(Austria) T Muster	6	4	6
(Italy) C Pistolesi	4	6	3
(Australia) J Fitzgerald	3	7	6
Q	(Belgium) X Daufresne	6	5	2
(Australia) J Stoltenberg	7	3	r
WC	(Australia) M Kratzmann	5	4
(Socialist Federal Republic of Yugoslavia) B Orešar	1	4
5	(United States) P Annacone	6	6

Second round
1	(Spain) S Bruguera	6^{3}	6	6
WC	(Australia) B Dyke	7^{7}	2	3
(West Germany) M Stich	6	6
7	(Netherlands) M Schapers	4	3
3	(Austria) T Muster	6	7^{7}
(Australia) J Fitzgerald	2	6^{3}
WC	(Australia) M Kratzmann	6	6
5	(United States) P Annacone	4	4

Quarterfinals
1	(Spain) S Bruguera	6^{2}	6	6
(West Germany) M Stich	7^{7}	0	4
3	(Austria) T Muster	7	6
WC	(Australia) M Kratzmann	5	4

Semifinals
1	(Spain) S Bruguera	6	2	6^{1}
3	(Austria) T Muster	2	6	7^{7}

=== Bottom half ===
First round
6	(Netherlands) M Koevermans	6	6
Q	(West Germany) A Mronz	1	4
(Netherlands) P Haarhuis	3	6	6^{5}
(West Germany) P Kühnen	6	2	7^{7}
(Australia) M Woodforde	6^{7}	3
(United States) J Arias	7^{9}	6
WC	(Australia) T Woodbridge	4	6	4
4	(Soviet Union) A Volkov	6	1	6
8	(Switzerland) M Rosset	6	6
(Soviet Union) A Cherkasov	2	4
(France) J Potier	6	6
(Socialist Federal Republic of Yugoslavia) S Živojinović	3	4
(France) J-P Fleurian	6	6
(Netherlands) T Nijssen	3	0
Q	(West Germany) U Riglewski	1	6	6
2	(Socialist Federal Republic of Yugoslavia) G Ivanišević	6	3	1

Second round
6	(Netherlands) M Koevermans	6	3	6
(West Germany) P Kühnen	3	6	1
(United States) J Arias	6	7^{8}
4	(Soviet Union) A Volkov	4	6^{6}
8	(Switzerland) M Rosset	4	4
(France) J Potier	6	6
(France) J-P Fleurian	6	6
Q	(West Germany) U Riglewski	3	4

Quarterfinals
6	(Netherlands) M Koevermans	3	4
(United States) J Arias	6	6
(France) J Potier	3	6	1
(France) J-P Fleurian	6	3	6

Semifinals
(United States) J Arias	6	6
(France) J-P Fleurian	3	4
