= 1991 Australian Men's Hardcourt Championships – Doubles =

Doubles
- 1991 Australian Men's Hardcourt Championships

Final
- Champions: (South Africa) Wayne Ferreira (South Africa) Stefan Kruger
- Runners-up: (Netherlands) Paul Haarhuis (Netherlands) Mark Koevermans
- Score: 6–4, 4–6, 6–4

Details
- Draw: 16
- Seeds: 4

Events
| Singles | Doubles |
- Australian Men's Hardcourt Championships

Andrew Castle and Nduka Odizor were the defending champions, but did not participate together this year. Castle partnered Roger Smith, losingin the quarterfinals. Odizor partnered Cyril Suk, losing in the quarterfinals.

Wayne Ferreira and Stefan Kruger won the title, defeating Paul Haarhuis and Mark Koevermans 6–4, 4–6, 6–4 in the final.

== Seeds ==
1. (Australia) Mark Kratzmann / (Australia) Jason Stoltenberg (first round)
2. (Germany) Udo Riglewski / (Germany) Michael Stich (first round)
3. (Australia) Broderick Dyke / (Australia) John Fitzgerald (first round)
4. (Netherlands) Paul Haarhuis / (Netherlands) Mark Koevermans (final)

== Draw ==
Key

- Q = Qualifier
- WC = Wild card
- LL = Lucky loser
- Alt = Alternate
- ITF = ITF entry
- PR = Protected ranking
- SR = Special ranking
- SE = Special exempt
- JE = Junior exempt
- JR = Junior Accelerator Programme entrant
- CO = College Accelerator Programme entrant
- NG = Next Gen Accelerator Program entrant
- w/o = Walkover
- r = Retired
- d = Defaulted

=== Draw ===
First round
1 | (Australia) M Kratzmann (Australia) J Stoltenberg | 4 | 6
(Germany) B Becker (Germany) E Jelen | 6 | 7
WC | (Australia) P Doohan (Australia) L Warder | 4 | 5
(Nigeria) N Odizor (Czechoslovakia) C Suk | 6 | 7
4 | (Netherlands) P Haarhuis (Netherlands) M Koevermans | 7 | 6
LL | (United States) C Adams (Italy) G Pozzi | 5 | 3
(Australia) T Woodbridge (Australia) M Woodforde | 4 | 6 | 6
(United Kingdom) A Castle (The Bahamas) R Smith | 6 | 4 | 7
(United Kingdom) N Broad (Australia) S Youl | 7 | 5 | 6
(United States) S DeVries (Australia) D Macpherson | 5 | 7 | 4
(United States) J Brown (United States) S Salumaa | 6 | 7
3 | (Australia) B Dyke (Australia) J Fitzgerald | 2 | 5
(South Africa) W Ferreira (South Africa) S Kruger | 3 | 6 | 7
(United States) J Courier (United States) G Layendecker | 6 | 2 | 6
(United States) B Pearce (Netherlands) M Schapers | 7 | 6
2 | (Germany) U Riglewski (Germany) M Stich | 5 | 3

Quarterfinals
(Germany) B Becker (Germany) E Jelen | 6 | 6
(Nigeria) N Odizor (Czechoslovakia) C Suk | 3 | 1
4 | (Netherlands) P Haarhuis (Netherlands) M Koevermans | 6 | 6
(United Kingdom) A Castle (The Bahamas) R Smith | 4 | 4
(United Kingdom) N Broad (Australia) S Youl | 4 | 7 | 7
(United States) J Brown (United States) S Salumaa | 6 | 5 | 6
(South Africa) W Ferreira (South Africa) S Kruger | 6 | 6
(United States) B Pearce (Netherlands) M Schapers | 4 | 4

Semifinals
(Germany) B Becker (Germany) E Jelen | 3 | 4
4 | (Netherlands) P Haarhuis (Netherlands) M Koevermans | 6 | 6
(United Kingdom) N Broad (Australia) S Youl | 6 | 3
(South Africa) W Ferreira (South Africa) S Kruger | 7 | 6

Final
4 | (Netherlands) P Haarhuis (Netherlands) M Koevermans | 4 | 6 | 4
(South Africa) W Ferreira (South Africa) S Kruger | 6 | 4 | 6
