= 1995 Australian Men's Hardcourt Championships =

- Date: 2–9 January
- Edition: 18th
- Category: ATP World Series
- Draw: 32S / 16D
- Prize money: $303,000
- Surface: Hard / outdoor
- Location: Adelaide, Australia

Champions

Singles
- (United States) Jim Courier

Doubles
- (United States) Jim Courier / (Australia) Patrick Rafter
- Australian Hard Court Championships

The 1995 Adelaide International was a men's tennis tournament held in Adelaide, Australia and played on outdoor hard courts. The event was part of the ATP World Series of the 1995 ATP Tour. It was the 18th edition of the tournament and was held from 2 January through 9 January 1995.

Third-seeded Jim Courier won his 1st title of the year, and 15th of his career.

== Finals ==
=== Singles ===
(United States) Jim Courier defeated (France) Arnaud Boetsch, 6–2, 7–5

=== Doubles ===
(United States) Jim Courier / (Australia) Patrick Rafter defeated (Zimbabwe) Byron Black / (Canada) Grant Connell, 7–6, 6–4
