= 1994 Australian Men's Hardcourt Championships – Doubles =

Tennis tournament

Doubles
- 1994 Australian Men's Hardcourt Championships

Final
- Champions: (Australia) Andrew Kratzmann (Australia) Mark Kratzmann
- Runners-up: (South Africa) David Adams (Zimbabwe) Byron Black
- Score: 6–4, 6–3

Details
- Draw: 16
- Seeds: 4

Events
Singles	Doubles
← 1993 ·	Australian Men's Hardcourt Championships	· 1995 →

Todd Woodbridge and Mark Woodforde were the defending champions, but did not participate this year.

Andrew Kratzmann and Mark Kratzmann won the title, defeating Byron Black and Grant Connell 6–4, 6–3 in the final.

== Seeds ==
1. (South Africa) David Adams / (Zimbabwe) Byron Black (final)
2. (Australia) David Macpherson / (Australia) Laurie Warder (first round)
3. (United States) Mike Bauer / (Czech Republic) David Rikl (quarterfinals)
4. N/A

== Draw ==
=== Key ===
- Q = Qualifier
- WC = Wild card
- LL = Lucky loser
- Alt = Alternate
- SE = Special exempt
- PR = Protected ranking
- ITF = ITF entry
- JE = Junior exempt
- w/o = Walkover
- r = Retired
- d = Defaulted
- SR = Special ranking

=== Draw ===
First round
1	(South Africa) D Adams (Zimbabwe) B Black	6	6
(Netherlands) M Schapers (Czech Republic) D Vacek	2	4
(Argentina) P Albano (United States) B Devening	7	6	4
Q	(Sweden) M Renström (New Zealand) B Steven	6	7	6
LL	(Australia) H Denman (Australia) G Doyle	5	4
LL	(South Africa) E Ferreira (Sweden) L-A Wahlgren	7	6
(Sweden) J Apell (Russia) Y Kafelnikov	6	3	7
(Canada) S Lareau (Canada) D Nestor	2	6	5
(Australia) A Kratzmann (Australia) M Kratzmann	6	6
(United States) D DiLucia (United States) B Shelton	3	4
(United States) B Garnett (United States) TJ Middleton	3	6
3	(United States) M Bauer (Czech Republic) D Rikl	6	7
(South Africa) L Bale (South Africa) D Nainkin	5	6
WC	(Australia) D Cahill (Australia) J Fitzgerald	7	7
(Czech Republic) V Flégl (Czech Republic) K Nováček	6	6
2	(Australia) D Macpherson (Australia) L Warder	4	4

Quarterfinals
1	(South Africa) D Adams (Zimbabwe) B Black	6	7
Q	(Sweden) M Renström (New Zealand) B Steven	2	6
LL	(South Africa) E Ferreira (Sweden) L-A Wahlgren	0	4
(Sweden) J Apell (Russia) Y Kafelnikov	6	6
(Australia) A Kratzmann (Australia) M Kratzmann	7	6
3	(United States) M Bauer (Czech Republic) D Rikl	5	2
WC	(Australia) D Cahill (Australia) J Fitzgerald	6	6	7
(Czech Republic) V Flégl (Czech Republic) K Nováček	1	7	5

Semifinals
1	(South Africa) D Adams (Zimbabwe) B Black	3	6	7
(Sweden) J Apell (Russia) Y Kafelnikov	6	4	6
(Australia) A Kratzmann (Australia) M Kratzmann	7	6
WC	(Australia) D Cahill (Australia) J Fitzgerald	5	4

Final
1	(South Africa) D Adams (Zimbabwe) B Black	4	3
(Australia) A Kratzmann (Australia) M Kratzmann	6	6
