= 1993 Australian Men's Hardcourt Championships – Singles =

Singles
- 1993 Australian Men's Hardcourt Championships

Final
- Champion: (Sweden) Nicklas Kulti
- Runner-up: (Sweden) Christian Bergström
- Score: 1–6, 7–6^{(7–5)}, 6–4

Details
- Draw: 32
- Seeds: 8

Events
Singles	Doubles
← 1992 ·	Australian Men's Hardcourt Championships	· 1994 →

Nicklas Kulti defeated Christian Bergström 3–6, 7–5, 6–4 to secure the title.

== Seeds ==
1. (Netherlands) Richard Krajicek (second round)
2. (Spain) Sergi Bruguera (first round)
3. (Russia) Alexander Volkov (quarterfinals)
4. (France) Cédric Pioline (quarterfinals)
5. (Sweden) Magnus Larsson (first round)
6. (Australia) Mark Woodforde (first round)
7. (United States) David Wheaton (first round)
8. (Sweden) Magnus Gustafsson (first round)

== Draw ==
=== Key ===
- Q = Qualifier
- WC = Wild card
- LL = Lucky loser
- Alt = Alternate
- SE = Special exempt
- PR = Protected ranking
- ITF = ITF entry
- JE = Junior exempt
- w/o = Walkover
- r = Retired
- d = Defaulted
- SR = Special ranking

=== Finals ===
Semifinals
(United States) J Stark	6	4	4
(Sweden) N Kulti	4	6	6
(Sweden) C Bergström	6	6
(Australia) R Fromberg	4	4

Final
(Sweden) N Kulti	3	7	6
(Sweden) C Bergström	6	5	4

=== Section 1 ===
First round
1	(Netherlands) R Krajicek	6	6
(Sweden) T Enqvist	1	4
(United States) A O'Brien	7^{7}	7^{7}
Q	(Australia) B Dyke	6^{4}	6^{5}
(Australia) T Woodbridge	2	2
(United States) J Stark	6	6
Q	(Spain) J Burillo	6	6
7	(United States) D Wheaton	1	3
3	(Russia) A Volkov	7^{7}	6
(Sweden) J Svensson	6^{4}	3
WC	(Australia) S Baldas	4	1
(Germany) M Naewie	6	6
(Australia) J Morgan	6	6
(Germany) B Karbacher	4	2
(Sweden) N Kulti	6	7^{7}
6	(Australia) M Woodforde	4	6^{4}

Second round
1	(Netherlands) R Krajicek	4	4
(United States) A O'Brien	6	6
(United States) J Stark	7^{7}	6
Q	(Spain) J Burillo	6^{4}	2
3	(Russia) A Volkov	6	6
(Germany) M Naewie	2	1
(Australia) J Morgan	4	4
(Sweden) N Kulti	6	6

Quarterfinals
(United States) A O'Brien	2	1
(United States) J Stark	6	6
3	(Russia) A Volkov	4	6	3
(Sweden) N Kulti	6	1	6

Semifinals
(United States) J Stark	6	4	4
(Sweden) N Kulti	4	6	6

=== Section 2 ===
First round
5	(Sweden) M Larsson	3	4
(United States) D Rostagno	6	6
(Denmark) K Carlsen	6^{3}	2
(Sweden) C Bergström	7^{7}	6
(United States) T Martin	6	6^{7}	6
(United States) B Shelton	3	7^{9}	4
(Australia) S Stolle	3	2
4	(France) C Pioline	6	6
8	(Sweden) M Gustafsson	7^{7}	4	3
(Australia) R Fromberg	6^{5}	6	6
Q	(United States) D DiLucia	4	4
Q	(United States) D Pate	6	6
WC	(Australia) J Stoltenberg	7^{7}	6
(South Africa) M Ondruska	6^{4}	0
WC	(Australia) J Fitzgerald	6	2	7^{7}
2	(Spain) S Bruguera	4	6	6^{4}

Second round
(United States) D Rostagno	3	2
(Sweden) C Bergström	6	6
(United States) T Martin	4	1
4	(France) C Pioline	6	6
(Australia) R Fromberg	7^{7}	7^{10}
Q	(United States) D Pate	6^{3}	6^{8}
WC	(Australia) J Stoltenberg	3	4
WC	(Australia) J Fitzgerald	6	6

Quarterfinals
(Sweden) C Bergström	7	7^{7}
4	(France) C Pioline	5	6^{4}
(Australia) R Fromberg	6	6
WC	(Australia) J Fitzgerald	4	4

Semifinals
(Sweden) C Bergström	6	6
(Australia) R Fromberg	4	4
