= Grand Slam Cup =

Defunct tennis tournament
- Founded: 1990
- Abolished: 1999
- Editions: 10
- Location: Munich, Germany
- Venue: Olympiahalle
- Category: Grand Slam Cup
- Surface: Carpet / indoors (1990–97); Hard / indoors (1998–99)

The Grand Slam Cup was a tennis tournament held annually at the Olympiahalle in Munich, Germany from 1990 through 1999. The event was organized by the International Tennis Federation (ITF), which invited the best-performing players in the year's Grand Slam events to compete in the Grand Slam Cup.

== History ==
The tournament was created in 1990 and was played on indoor carpet courts. From 1990 to 1996, it was held in December but was moved to the middle of autumn from 1997 to 1999. From 1990 to 1997 the tournament was limited to male players. A women's Cup was added in 1998 and was held simultaneously with the men's Cup.

Throughout its existence, the Grand Slam Cup was famous for paying out the highest prize money of any tournament in tennis. The winner for the first three years of the Cup received U.S.$2 million in prize money, which dipped to $1.625 million in 1993, rose to $1.875 million in 1996 and back to $2 million in 1997 before falling to $1.3 million in 1998. If the Cup was won by a player who had also won a Grand Slam event that year they received a bonus of $1 million. Prize money for the winner of the two women's Cups was fixed at $800,000.

The Grand Slam Cup was not recognized by the Association of Tennis Professionals (ATP) and participants did not receive points in the ATP computer rankings nor have it credited as an official career title. Following the discontinuation of the Cup in 1999, the ATP decided to give the event retroactive recognition and added it to players' record of official titles. A compromise between the ITF and the ATP was announced on December 9, 1999 which merged the Cup with the ATP Tour World Championship, the ATP's year-end tournament also held annually in Germany, giving birth to the ATP World Tour Finals, an official tour event.

A direct result of the merging of the two competitions can still be seen in the qualification rules for the ATP World Tour Finals, which included one notable difference from those of the prior ATP Tour World Championship. The Tour World Championship was meant to include the top eight players on the ATP computer rankings at the end of a season, even though this could mean the exclusion of a Grand Slam champion who had not been able to earn sufficient ranking points in the rest of the year. Present Finals rules ensure the participation of a Grand Slam champion who is unable to earn a top eight ranking at the end of the season and automatic qualification for the top seven players in the computer rankings. The eighth ranked player, however, qualifies only if all Grand Slam singles champions are among the top eight. Any Grand Slam event champion who is not in the top eight but is still in the top twenty is included to the detriment of the eighth ranked player. This situation occurred at the 2004 Tennis Masters Cup, where Andre Agassi, the No. 8 ranked player in the ATP Champions Race, was excluded from the event in favor of Gastón Gaudio, who had won that year's French Open but was ranked tenth at the end of the year.

Pete Sampras was the most successful player at this event winning two titles out of three final appearances.

== Qualification ==
Qualification and seeding for the Grand Slam Cup were not related to the ATP computer rankings. Points were allocated to a player based on his Grand Slam performances, and after all four Grand Slam events had concluded the 16 players with the most points – 12 in 1998 and 1999 – qualified for the Cup. Grand Slam champions were not assured of a berth in the event.

Qualification points (Grand Slams tournaments only)
| Grand Slam Round | W | F | SF | QF | R16 | R32 | R64 | R128 |
| Points | 600 | 450 | 300 | 150 | 75 | 40 | 20 | 2 |

=== Format of play ===
In the men's tournament the first two rounds of the Cup were the best of three sets while the semifinals and final were the best of five sets. There was no tie-break if a match went over the full distance.

In the women's tournament all rounds were best of three sets.

== Finals ==
=== Men ===
| Year | Champion | Runner-up | Score |
|---|---|---|---|
| 1990 | (United States) Pete Sampras | (United States) Brad Gilbert | 6–3, 6–4, 6–2 |
| 1991 | (United States) David Wheaton | (United States) Michael Chang | 7–5, 6–2, 6–4 |
| 1992 | (Germany) Michael Stich | (United States) Michael Chang | 6–2, 6–3, 6–2 |
| 1993 | (Czech Republic) Petr Korda | (Germany) Michael Stich | 2–6, 6–4, 7–6^{(7–5)}, 2–6, 11–9 |
| 1994 | (Sweden) Magnus Larsson | (United States) Pete Sampras | 7–6^{(8–6)}, 4–6, 7–6^{(7–5)}, 6–4 |
| 1995 | (Croatia) Goran Ivanišević | (United States) Todd Martin | 7–6^{(7–4)}, 6–3, 6–4 |
| 1996 | (Germany) Boris Becker | (Croatia) Goran Ivanišević | 6–3, 6–4, 6–4 |
| 1997 | (United States) Pete Sampras (2) | (Australia) Patrick Rafter | 6–2, 6–4, 7–5 |
| 1998 | (Chile) Marcelo Ríos | (United States) Andre Agassi | 6–4, 2–6, 7–6^{(7–1)}, 5–7, 6–3 |
| 1999 | (United Kingdom) Greg Rusedski | (Germany) Tommy Haas | 6–3, 6–4, 6–7^{(5–7)}, 7–6^{(7–5)} |

=== Women ===
| Year | Champion | Runner-up | Score |
|---|---|---|---|
| 1998 | (United States) Venus Williams | (Switzerland) Patty Schnyder | 6–2, 3–6, 6–2 |
| 1999 | (United States) Serena Williams | (United States) Venus Williams | 6–1, 3–6, 6–3 |

== Draws ==
=== 1990 ===
Date: December 11 – December 16

First Round
1 | (Sweden) Stefan Edberg | 4 | 6 | 5
(United States) Michael Chang | 6 | 4 | 7
Alt | (France) Henri Leconte | 6 | 6
7 | (Austria) Thomas Muster | 3 | 4
4 | (United States) Pete Sampras | 5 | 6 | 7
(Soviet Union) Andrei Cherkasov | 7 | 2 | 5
Alt | (United States) Kevin Curren | 6^{3} | 6^{7}
5 | (Socialist Federal Republic of Yugoslavia) Goran Ivanišević | 7^{7} | 7^{9}
6 | (Sweden) Jonas Svensson | 6 | 3 | 4
Alt | (United States) Brad Gilbert | 2 | 6 | 6
(United States) Aaron Krickstein | 6 | 6
3 | (Ecuador) Andrés Gómez | 3 | 4
8 | (United States) David Wheaton | 7^{7} | 6^{5} | 6
(France) Yannick Noah | 6^{2} | 7^{7} | 3
Alt | (Sweden) Christian Bergström | 4 | 0
2 | (Czechoslovakia) Ivan Lendl | 6 | 6

Quarterfinals
(United States) Michael Chang | 7^{7} | 6
Alt | (France) Henri Leconte | 6^{3} | 3
4 | (United States) Pete Sampras | 7^{7} | 6^{5} | 8
5 | (Socialist Federal Republic of Yugoslavia) Goran Ivanišević | 6^{2} | 7^{7} | 6
(United States) Aaron Krickstein | 7^{7} | 4 | 3
Alt | (United States) Brad Gilbert | 6^{5} | 6 | 6
8 | (United States) David Wheaton | 6 | 7^{7}
2 | (Czechoslovakia) Ivan Lendl | 2 | 6^{4}

Semifinals
(United States) Michael Chang | 3 | 4 | 4
4 | (United States) Pete Sampras | 6 | 6 | 6
Alt | (United States) Brad Gilbert | 6 | 3 | 7^{9} | 2 | 6
8 | (United States) David Wheaton | 3 | 6 | 6^{7} | 6 | 4

Final
4 | (United States) Pete Sampras | 6 | 6 | 6
Alt | (United States) Brad Gilbert | 3 | 4 | 2

=== 1991 ===
Date: December 10 – December 15

First Round
Alt | (Australia) Todd Woodbridge | 6 | 6
Alt | (United States) Aaron Krickstein | 3 | 3
(Netherlands) Paul Haarhuis | 6 | 2 | 3
7 | (United States) David Wheaton | 1 | 6 | 6
3 | (Germany) Michael Stich | 6 | 6
(Croatia) Goran Prpić | 4 | 3
(Peru) Jaime Yzaga | 3 | 3
5 | (France) Guy Forget | 6 | 6
6 | (United States) Jimmy Connors | 6 | 4 | 4
(Switzerland) Jakob Hlasek | 0 | 6 | 6
Alt | (Italy) Cristiano Caratti | 4 | 1
4 | (Czechoslovakia) Ivan Lendl | 6 | 6
8 | (United States) Patrick McEnroe | 4 | 6 | 6
(France) Thierry Champion | 6 | 1 | 4
(United States) Michael Chang | 6 | 6
2 | (United States) Jim Courier | 4 | 2

Quarterfinals
Alt | (Australia) Todd Woodbridge | 4 | 6^{6}
7 | (United States) David Wheaton | 6 | 7^{8}
3 | (Germany) Michael Stich | 7^{10} | 6
5 | (France) Guy Forget | 6^{8} | 4
(Switzerland) Jakob Hlasek | 6^{7} | 3
4 | (Czechoslovakia) Ivan Lendl | 7^{9} | 6
8 | (United States) Patrick McEnroe | 2 | 4
(United States) Michael Chang | 6 | 6

Semifinals
7 | (United States) David Wheaton | 7^{8} | 7^{8} | 7^{7}
3 | (Germany) Michael Stich | 6^{6} | 6^{6} | 6^{3}
4 | (Czechoslovakia) Ivan Lendl | 6 | 6 | 4 | 6^{5} | 7
(United States) Michael Chang | 2 | 4 | 6 | 7^{7} | 9

Final
7 | (United States) David Wheaton | 7 | 6 | 6
(United States) Michael Chang | 5 | 2 | 4

=== 1992 ===
Date: December 8 – December 13

First Round
1 | (Sweden) Stefan Edberg | 6^{4} | 7^{7} | 6
(Germany) Michael Stich | 7^{7} | 6^{4} | 8
Alt | (Spain) Emilio Sánchez | 3 | 2
8 | (Netherlands) Richard Krajicek | 6 | 6
3 | (United States) Pete Sampras | 6 | 6
(Commonwealth of Independent States) Alexander Volkov | 3 | 4
(France) Henri Leconte | 3 | 6 | 6
5 | (South Africa) Wayne Ferreira | 6 | 3 | 0
6 | (United States) John McEnroe | 6 | 6
Alt | (Sweden) Nicklas Kulti | 1 | 4
(France) Guy Forget | 5 | 4
4 | (Croatia) Goran Ivanišević | 7 | 6
7 | (Czechoslovakia) Petr Korda | 2 | 7 | 6
Alt | (Australia) Wally Masur | 6 | 5 | 4
(United States) Michael Chang | 6 | 6
2 | (United States) Andre Agassi | 4 | 2

Quarterfinals
(Germany) Michael Stich | 7^{7} | 7
8 | (Netherlands) Richard Krajicek | 6^{4} | 5
3 | (United States) Pete Sampras | 7^{7} | 6
(France) Henri Leconte | 6^{3} | 4
6 | (United States) John McEnroe | 6 | 4 | 2
4 | (Croatia) Goran Ivanišević | 3 | 6 | 6
7 | (Czechoslovakia) Petr Korda | 3 | 4
(United States) Michael Chang | 6 | 6

Semifinals
(Germany) Michael Stich | 7^{7} | 7^{7} | 3 | 7^{7}
4 | (United States) Pete Sampras | 6^{3} | 6^{5} | 6 | 6^{2}
4 | (Croatia) Goran Ivanišević | 7^{7} | 2 | 4 | 6 | 3
(United States) Michael Chang | 6^{3} | 6 | 6 | 3 | 6

Final
(Germany) Michael Stich | 6 | 6 | 6
(United States) Michael Chang | 2 | 3 | 2

=== 1993 ===
Date: December 7 – December 12

First Round
1 | (United States) Pete Sampras | 6 | 6
(Austria) Thomas Muster | 3 | 1
(United States) Michael Chang | 6 | 4 | 7
8 | (Australia) Wally Masur | 2 | 6 | 5
3 | (Spain) Sergi Bruguera | 6 | 6
(Sweden) Magnus Larsson | 3 | 4
(Czech Republic) Petr Korda | 6 | 6
8 | (Russia) Alexander Volkov | 2 | 3
5 | (Germany) Michael Stich | 6 | 6
Alt | (United States) MaliVai Washington | 3 | 1
Alt | (New Zealand) Brett Steven | 6 | 7^{9}
4 | (France) Cédric Pioline | 4 | 6^{7}
7 | (Germany) Boris Becker | 5 | 4
(South Africa) Wayne Ferreira | 7 | 6
Alt | (United States) Todd Martin | 3 | 2
2 | (Sweden) Stefan Edberg | 6 | 6

Quarterfinals
1 | (United States) Pete Sampras | 7^{9} | 6
(United States) Michael Chang | 6^{7} | 3
3 | (Spain) Sergi Bruguera | 6 | 0 | 4
(Czech Republic) Petr Korda | 4 | 6 | 6
5 | (Germany) Michael Stich | 5 | 6 | 6
Alt | (New Zealand) Brett Steven | 7 | 4 | 4
(South Africa) Wayne Ferreira | 7^{7} | 1 | 0
(Sweden) Stefan Edberg | 6^{5} | 6 | 6

Semifinals
1 | (United States) Pete Sampras | 6 | 6^{3} | 6 | 6^{10} | 11
(Czechoslovakia) Petr Korda | 3 | 7^{7} | 3 | 7^{12} | 13
5 | (Germany) Michael Stich | 2 | 3 | 6 | 6 | 6
2 | (Sweden) Stefan Edberg | 6 | 6 | 3 | 3 | 1

Final
(Czechoslovakia) Petr Korda | 2 | 6 | 7^{7} | 2 | 11
5 | (Germany) Michael Stich | 6 | 4 | 6^{5} | 6 | 9

=== 1994 ===
Date: December 6 – December 11

First Round
1 | (United States) Pete Sampras | 6 | 6
Alt | (Peru) Jaime Yzaga | 2 | 4
(Spain) Alberto Berasategui | 1 | 5
8 | (United States) Michael Chang | 6 | 7
3 | (Germany) Boris Becker | 5 | 6 | 6
(South Africa) Wayne Ferreira | 7 | 4 | 3
(Sweden) Jonas Björkman | 4 | 2
6 | (Croatia) Goran Ivanišević | 6 | 6
5 | (United States) Todd Martin | 7^{7} | 6
(Czech Republic) Karel Nováček | 6^{5} | 4
Alt | (Ukraine) Andriy Medvedev | 7 | 4 | 0
4 | (Spain) Sergi Bruguera | 5 | 6 | 6
7 | (Sweden) Stefan Edberg | 4 | 7^{9} | 6
(Sweden) Magnus Larsson | 6 | 6^{7} | 8
(Austria) Thomas Muster | 3 | 5
2 | (United States) Andre Agassi | 6 | 7

Quarterfinals
1 | (United States) Pete Sampras | 6 | 6
8 | (United States) Michael Chang | 4 | 3
3 | (Germany) Boris Becker | 4 | 1
6 | (Croatia) Goran Ivanišević | 6 | 6
5 | (United States) Todd Martin | 6 | 7^{7}
4 | (Spain) Sergi Bruguera | 4 | 6^{5}
(Sweden) Magnus Larsson | 6 | 1 | 6
2 | (United States) Andre Agassi | 3 | 6 | 0

Semifinals
1 | (United States) Pete Sampras | 5 | 6 | 6 | 6^{5} | 10
6 | (Croatia) Goran Ivanišević | 7 | 3 | 4 | 7^{7} | 8
5 | (United States) Todd Martin | 4 | 1 | 1
(Sweden) Magnus Larsson | 6 | 6 | 6

Final
1 | (United States) Pete Sampras | 6^{6} | 6 | 6^{5} | 4
(Sweden) Magnus Larsson | 7^{8} | 4 | 7^{7} | 6

=== 1995 ===
Date: December 5 – December 10

First Round
1 | (United States) Pete Sampras | 6 | 7^{7}
(United States) Patrick McEnroe | 1 | 6^{1}
(Czech Republic) Petr Korda | 6^{3} | 3
8 | (Croatia) Goran Ivanišević | 7^{7} | 6
4 | (United States) Michael Chang | 6^{10} | 3
(Netherlands) Jacco Eltingh | 7^{12} | 6
(Italy) Renzo Furlan | 4 | 1
6 | (Russia) Yevgeny Kafelnikov | 6 | 6
5 | (Austria) Thomas Muster | 6^{3} | 6 | 1
Alt | (Zimbabwe) Byron Black | 7^{7} | 2 | 6
Alt | (France) Cédric Pioline | 1 | 7^{7} | 7
3 | (Germany) Boris Becker | 6 | 6^{2} | 9
10 | (Ukraine) Andriy Medvedev | 6 | 7^{10}
(United States) Aaron Krickstein | 2 | 6^{8}
(Spain) Sergi Bruguera | 6^{2} | 4
9 | (United States) Todd Martin | 7^{7} | 6

Quarterfinals
1 | (United States) Pete Sampras
8 | (Croatia) Goran Ivanišević | w/o
(Netherlands) Jacco Eltingh | 6 | 3 | 2
6 | (Russia) Yevgeny Kafelnikov | 3 | 6 | 6
Alt | (Zimbabwe) Byron Black | 6^{1} | 1
3 | (Germany) Boris Becker | 7^{7} | 6
10 | (Ukraine) Andriy Medvedev | 3 | 6 | 0^{r}
9 | (United States) Todd Martin | 6 | 3 | 4

Semifinals
8 | (Croatia) Goran Ivanišević | 7^{9} | 4 | 6 | 6
6 | (Russia) Yevgeny Kafelnikov | 6^{7} | 6 | 3 | 4
3 | (Germany) Boris Becker | 7 | 3 | 4 | 6^{4}
9 | (United States) Todd Martin | 5 | 6 | 6 | 7^{7}

Final
8 | (Croatia) Goran Ivanišević | 7^{7} | 6 | 6
9 | (United States) Todd Martin | 6^{4} | 3 | 4

=== 1996 ===
Date: December 3 – December 8

First Round
11 | (Germany) Michael Stich | 3 | 3
Alt | (United Kingdom) Tim Henman | 6 | 6
(United States) MaliVai Washington | 6 | 6
7 | (Netherlands) Richard Krajicek | 1 | 2
4 | (Germany) Boris Becker | 6 | 6
(Australia) Jason Stoltenberg | 3 | 2
Alt | (Switzerland) Jakob Hlasek | 2 | 6 | 6
10 | (France) Cédric Pioline | 6 | 3 | 4
9 | (Switzerland) Marc Rosset | 5 | 2
(United States) Jim Courier | 7 | 6
Alt | (Spain) Àlex Corretja | 4 | 6^{3}
3 | (Russia) Yevgeny Kafelnikov | 6 | 7^{7}
8 | (United States) Andre Agassi | 3 | 4
(Australia) Mark Woodforde | 6 | 6
(Sweden) Mikael Tillström | 4 | 2
2 | (Croatia) Goran Ivanišević | 6 | 6

Quarterfinals
Alt | (United Kingdom) Tim Henman | 7^{7} | 6
(United States) MaliVai Washington | 6^{3} | 3
4 | (Germany) Boris Becker | 6 | 6
Alt | (Switzerland) Jakob Hlasek | 4 | 1
(United States) Jim Courier | 6 | 4 | 6
3 | (Russia) Yevgeny Kafelnikov | 2 | 6 | 8
(Australia) Mark Woodforde | 4 | 4
2 | (Croatia) Goran Ivanišević | 6 | 6

Semifinals
Alt | (United Kingdom) Tim Henman | 6^{2} | 3 | 1
4 | (Germany) Boris Becker | 7^{7} | 6 | 6
3 | (Russia) Yevgeny Kafelnikov | 7^{8} | 6 | 3 | 2 | 4
2 | (Croatia) Goran Ivanišević | 6^{6} | 2 | 6 | 6 | 6

Final
4 | (Germany) Boris Becker | 6 | 6 | 6
2 | (Croatia) Goran Ivanišević | 3 | 4 | 4

=== 1997 ===
Date: September 23 – September 28

First Round
1 | (United States) Pete Sampras | 6 | 3 | 6
(Spain) Félix Mantilla | 4 | 6 | 2
WC | (Germany) Boris Becker | 3 | 2
8 | (Sweden) Jonas Björkman | 6 | 6
4 | (United Kingdom) Greg Rusedski | 4 | 6 | 7
(Australia) Todd Woodbridge | 6 | 1 | 5
(Russia) Yevgeny Kafelnikov | 6 | 6
5 | (Spain) Sergi Bruguera | 4 | 3
6 | (France) Cédric Pioline | 7^{7} | 2
(Belgium) Filip Dewulf | 6^{4} | 2^{r}
(Czech Republic) Petr Korda | 6 | 5
3 | (Brazil) Gustavo Kuerten | 3 | 3^{r}
7 | (Chile) Marcelo Ríos | 6^{2} | 6 | 6
Alt | (Australia) Mark Woodforde | 7^{7} | 3 | 1
(Austria) Thomas Muster | 2 | 3
2 | (Australia) Patrick Rafter | 6 | 6

Quarterfinals
1 | (United States) Pete Sampras | 7^{8} | 6
8 | (Sweden) Jonas Björkman | 6^{6} | 4
4 | (United Kingdom) Greg Rusedski | 6^{5} | 6 | 6
(Russia) Yevgeny Kafelnikov | 7^{7} | 3 | 1
6 | (France) Cédric Pioline | 5 | 3
(Czech Republic) Petr Korda | 7 | 6
7 | (Chile) Marcelo Ríos | 1 | 6^{0}
2 | (Australia) Patrick Rafter | 6 | 7^{7}

Semifinals
1 | (United States) Pete Sampras | 3 | 7^{7} | 7^{7} | 6
4 | (United Kingdom) Greg Rusedski | 6 | 6^{1} | 6^{4} | 2
(Czech Republic) Petr Korda | 5 | 6 | 7^{7} | 6^{4} | 7
2 | (Australia) Patrick Rafter | 7 | 3 | 6^{4} | 7^{7} | 9

Final
1 | (United States) Pete Sampras | 6 | 6 | 7
2 | (Australia) Patrick Rafter | 2 | 4 | 5

=== 1998 ===
Date: September 29 – October 3

==== Men ====
First Round
(France) Cédric Pioline | 0 | 0
WC | (United States) Andre Agassi | 6 | 6
(Slovakia) Karol Kučera | 6 | 6
Alt | (Morocco) Hicham Arazi | 4 | 4
(United Kingdom) Tim Henman | 5 | 3
Alt | (Sweden) Jonas Björkman | 7 | 6
Alt | (France) Nicolas Escudé | 3 | 3
Alt | (Spain) Félix Mantilla | 6 | 6

Quarterfinals
1 | (Czech Republic) Petr Korda | 6 | 0 | 1
WC | (United States) Andre Agassi | 4 | 6 | 6
4 | (Croatia) Goran Ivanišević | 7 | 4 | 6
(Slovakia) Karol Kučera | 5 | 6 | 8
Alt | (Sweden) Jonas Björkman | 6 | 6^{1} | 1
3 | (Australia) Mark Philippoussis | 4 | 7^{7} | 6
Alt | (Spain) Félix Mantilla | 6^{2} | 5
2 | (Chile) Marcelo Ríos | 7^{7} | 7

Semifinals
WC | (United States) Andre Agassi | 7^{7} | 6^{5} | 2 | 7 | 6
(Slovakia) Karol Kučera | 6^{1} | 7^{7} | 6 | 5 | 0
3 | (Australia) Mark Philippoussis | 6^{4} | 3 | 4
2 | (Chile) Marcelo Ríos | 7^{7} | 6 | 6

Final
WC | (United States) Andre Agassi | 4 | 6 | 6^{1} | 7 | 3
2 | (Chile) Marcelo Ríos | 6 | 2 | 7^{7} | 5 | 6

==== Women ====
Quarterfinals
1 | (Switzerland) Martina Hingis | 6 | 7
(Spain) Conchita Martínez | 2 | 5
Alt | (Switzerland) Patty Schnyder | 2 | 7 | 7
3 | (Czech Republic) Jana Novotná | 6 | 5 | 5
4 | (Spain) Arantxa Sánchez Vicario | 3 | 2
(United States) Venus Williams | 6 | 6
(France) Nathalie Tauziat | 4 | 6 | 7
2 | (United States) Lindsay Davenport | 6 | 1 | 5

Semifinals
1 | (Switzerland) Martina Hingis | 7 | 5 | 5^{r}
Alt | (Switzerland) Patty Schnyder | 5 | 7 | 5
(United States) Venus Williams | 6 | 6
(France) Nathalie Tauziat | 4 | 0

Final
Alt | (Switzerland) Patty Schnyder | 2 | 6 | 2
(United States) Venus Williams | 6 | 3 | 6

=== 1999 ===
Date: September 27 – October 4

==== Men ====
First Round
Alt | (Slovakia) Dominik Hrbatý | 3 | 2
(Germany) Tommy Haas | 6 | 6
Alt | (Brazil) Fernando Meligeni | 2 | 6 | 14
(Ecuador) Nicolás Lapentti | 6 | 4 | 16
Alt | (United States) Vince Spadea | 2 | 5
Alt | (Netherlands) Richard Krajicek | 6 | 7
(Brazil) Gustavo Kuerten | 3 | 6 | 3
Alt | (United Kingdom) Greg Rusedski | 6 | 3 | 6

Quarterfinals
1 | (United States) Andre Agassi | 0 | 7^{7} | 4
(Germany) Tommy Haas | 6 | 6^{2} | 6
4 | (Sweden) Thomas Enqvist | 6 | 6
(Ecuador) Nicolás Lapentti | 3 | 2
Alt | (Netherlands) Richard Krajicek | 6^{5} | 4
3 | (Ukraine) Andriy Medvedev | 7^{7} | 6
Alt | (United Kingdom) Greg Rusedski | 7 | 7^{8}
2 | (Russia) Yevgeny Kafelnikov | 5 | 6^{6}

Semifinals
(Germany) Tommy Haas | 6 | 6 | 6^{4} | 6
4 | (Sweden) Thomas Enqvist | 3 | 4 | 7^{7} | 4
3 | (Ukraine) Andriy Medvedev | 3 | 6 | 6^{1} | 5
Alt | (United Kingdom) Greg Rusedski | 6 | 3 | 7^{7} | 7

Final
(Germany) Tommy Haas | 3 | 4 | 7^{7} | 6^{5}
Alt | (United Kingdom) Greg Rusedski | 6 | 6 | 6^{5} | 7^{7}

==== Women ====
Quarterfinals
1 | (Switzerland) Martina Hingis | 7^{7} | 6
(France) Amélie Mauresmo | 6^{1} | 2
4 | (United States) Venus Williams | 6 | 6
Alt | (Austria) Barbara Schett | 3 | 4
(Spain) Arantxa Sánchez Vicario | 3 | 1
3 | (United States) Serena Williams | 6 | 6
Alt | (France) Mary Pierce | 6 | 2 | 4
2 | (United States) Lindsay Davenport | 3 | 6 | 6

Semifinals
1 | (Switzerland) Martina Hingis | 2 | 7^{8} | 7
4 | (United States) Venus Williams | 6 | 6^{6} | 9
3 | (United States) Serena Williams | 6 | 6
2 | (United States) Lindsay Davenport | 3 | 4

Final
4 | (United States) Venus Williams | 1 | 6 | 3
3 | (United States) Serena Williams | 6 | 3 | 6
