= 1998 Australian Men's Hardcourt Championships =

- Date: 5 – 12 January
- Edition: 21st
- Category: ATP World Series
- Draw: 32S / 16D
- Surface: Hard / outdoor
- Location: Adelaide, Australia

Champions

Singles
- (Australia) Lleyton Hewitt

Doubles
- (Australia) Joshua Eagle / (Australia) Andrew Florent
- Australian Hard Court Championships

The 1998 Adelaide International was a men's ATP tennis tournament played on outdoor hard courts in Adelaide, Australia. It was the 21st edition of the tournament and was held from 5 January until 12 January. Sixteen-year old Lleyton Hewitt, who entered the main draw on a wildcard, won the first title of his career.

== Finals ==
=== Singles ===
(Australia) Lleyton Hewitt defeated (Australia) Jason Stoltenberg, 3–6, 6–3, 7–6^{(7–4)}

=== Doubles ===
(Australia) Joshua Eagle / (Australia) Andrew Florent defeated (South Africa) Ellis Ferreira / (United States) Rick Leach, 6–4, 6–7, 6–3
