= 1990 Australian Men's Hardcourt Championships =

- Date: 1–7 January
- Edition: 46th
- Category: World Series
- Draw: 32S / 16D
- Prize money: $125,000
- Surface: Hard / outdoor
- Location: Adelaide, Australia
- Venue: Memorial Drive Park

Champions

Singles
- (Austria) Thomas Muster

Doubles
- (United Kingdom) Andrew Castle / (Nigeria) Nduka Odizor
- Australian Hard Court Championships

The 1990 Australian Men's Hardcourt Championships was a tennis tournament played on outdoor hard courts at the Memorial Drive Park in Adelaide, Australia and was part of the World Series Free Week of the 1990 ATP Tour. It was the 46th edition of the tournament and was held from 1 January through 7 January 1990. Third-seeded Thomas Muster won the singles title.

== Finals ==
=== Singles ===
(Austria) Thomas Muster defeated (United States) Jimmy Arias 3–6, 6–2, 7–5

- It was Muster's 1st singles title of the year and the 6th of his career.

=== Doubles ===
(United Kingdom) Andrew Castle / (Nigeria) Nduka Odizor defeated (West Germany) Alexander Mronz / (Netherlands) Michiel Schapers 7–6, 6–2

- It was Castle's only title of the year and the 3rd of his career. It was Odizor's 1st title of the year and the 7th of his career.
