= 1994 Australian Men's Hardcourt Championships =

- Date: 3–10 January
- Edition: 17th
- Category: World Series
- Draw: 32S / 16D
- Prize money: $288,750
- Surface: Hard / outdoor
- Location: Adelaide, Australia

Champions

Singles
- (Russia) Yevgeny Kafelnikov

Doubles
- (Australia) Andrew Kratzmann / (Australia) Mark Kratzmann
- Australian Hard Court Championships

The 1994 Adelaide International, also known by its sponsored name Pure Milk Australian Men's Hardcourt Championships, was an ATP tennis tournament held in Adelaide, Australia. The tournament was part of the World Series of the 1994 ATP Tour and was held from 3 to 10 January 1994.

Yevgeny Kafelnikov won his 1st title of the year, and the 16th of his career.

== Finals ==
=== Singles ===
(Russia) Yevgeny Kafelnikov defeated (Russia) Alexander Volkov 6–4, 6–3

=== Doubles ===
(Australia) Andrew Kratzmann / (Australia) Mark Kratzmann defeated (South Africa) David Adams / (Zimbabwe) Byron Black 6–4, 6–3
