= Christian Bergström =

Swedish tennis player (born 1967)

- Country (sports): Sweden
- Residence: Monte Carlo, Monaco
- Born: 19 July 1967 (age 58) Gothenburg, Sweden
- Height: 1.80 m (5 ft 11 in)
- Turned pro: 1985
- Retired: 1996
- Plays: Right-handed (two-handed backhand)
- Prize money: $1,262,792

Singles
- Career record: 161–162
- Career titles: 0
- Highest ranking: No. 32 (27 January 1992)

Grand Slam singles results
- Australian Open: QF (1993)
- French Open: 3R (1990)
- Wimbledon: QF (1990, 1994)
- US Open: 2R (1987, 1991, 1994)

Other tournaments
- Grand Slam Cup: 1R (1990)

Doubles
- Career record: 8–11
- Career titles: 0
- Highest ranking: No. 333 (27 July 1992)

Per Christian Bergström (Swedish: [ˈkrɪs.ti.an ˈbæ̂rjˌstrœm]; born 19 July 1967) is a former tennis player from Sweden, who turned professional in 1985. He did not win any titles (neither singles nor doubles) during his career, but reached three singles quarter-finals in Grand Slam tournaments: Wimbledon (1990, 1994) and Australian Open (1993). The right-hander reached his highest individual ranking on the ATP Tour on 27 January 1992, when he became World No. 32.

== Career ==
=== 1984–1985: Junior career ===
Bergström was the Swedish junior champion in 1984 and European junior champion in 1985. He reached the semi-finals of the 1985 U.S. Open Juniors, losing to Joey Blake. At the Junior French Open, he lost in the 3rd round to Thomas Muster. Bergström was ranked No. 2 in the ITF Junior world rankings and turned professional at the end of 1985.

==== Junior Slam results – Singles ====
- French Open: 3R (1985)
- US Open: SF (1985)

==== Junior Slam results – Doubles ====
- French Open: QF (1985)
- US Open: 2R (1985)

=== 1986–1987 ===
Bergström started the year ranked 410 in the world on the ATP rankings and mostly competed on the ATP Challenger Series. He reached the quarter-finals at the Parioli Challenger, the semi-finals at the Bergen Challenger and his best result was winning the Tampere Challenger. He also qualified for two Grand Slam events, the French Open and the US Open, losing in the first round of both.

In 1987 Bergström reached the quarter-finals at the Dortmund Challenger and won the Porto Challenger. On the Grand Prix Tour he reached the quarter-finals at the Lorraine Open in Nancy and also in Madrid. Bergström participated in three Grand Slam events, beating countrymen in the first round of each. At the French Open he beat Johan Carlsson in the first round, at Wimbledon, Peter Lundgren and at the US Open, Mikael Pernfors had to retire in the first round. Bergström lost in the second round at all three events and ended the year ranked number 69 in the world on the ATP rankings.

=== 1988–1989 ===
Bergström did not compete in any Challenger tournaments during the 1988 season. On the Grand Prix Tour he reached two quarter-finals, at Metz and Geneva and two semi-finals at Båstad and Toulouse. He had his first victory over a top ten player when he beat the world number 10, Henri Leconte at the Toulouse tournament.

The 1989 season was less successful as Bergström reaches three quarter-finals, at Milan, Båstad and Toulouse. In November he reached the semi-finals at the Copenhagen Challenger and finished the year ranked number 106 in the world.

=== 1990–1991 ===
During April 1990, Bergström reached the quarter-finals in Munich as a qualifier, losing to the eventual winner Karel Nováček. He also qualified for the French Open, losing in 5 sets in the 3rd round to the 11th-seeded Michael Chang. At Wimbledon he upset the tournament 11th seed and word number 21, Guy Forget in the fourth round and lost in the quarter-finals to Stefan Edberg. During October he reached the quarter-finals in Toulouse and in November the semi-finals at the London-indoor. As a result of his Wimbledon success, Bergström qualified as one of sixteen players for the Grand Slam Cup, where he lost in the first round to Ivan Lendl.

Bergström kicked off 1991 with a fair amount of success by reaching the semi-finals in Wellington and the quarter-finals in Auckland. He also reached the quarter-finals at Rotterdam, Copenhagen, Basel and Toulouse, where he upset world number 5, Michael Stich in the first round. Bergström also made two semi-finals, in Munich where he beat Thomas Muster and in Båstad. His best result in a Grand Slam, was once again at Wimbledon, where he beat Brad Gilbert on his route to the round of 16.

Bergström broke into the top 50 in the world for the first time on 22 April 1991 at number 48 on the ATP ranking and during October advanced to number 40 on the ATP rankings. He made his debut for the Swedish Davis Cup team in the World Group qualifying round against the Philippines in Manila. He won both his singles matches and teaming up with Rikard Bergh, won the doubles.

=== 1992–1993 ===
Bergström made his first ATP Tour final at the first tournament of the year in Adelaide losing to Goran Ivanišević in three sets. The following week he reached the quarter-finals in Sydney beating the world number 9, Petr Korda in the second round. He finished his 1992 Australian journey by beating world number 7, Guy Forget on route to the last 16 at the Australian Open. After the Australian Open he reached his highest individual ranking of 32, on the ATP ranking. Later in the year, he also reached the quarter-finals in Båstad and Toulouse.

Partnering fellow Swede, Magnus Gustafsson he reached his first and only doubles final on the ATP Tour at Båstad. He made his second Davis Cup appearance for Sweden in the World Group quarter-finals against Australia, when he replaced Gustafsson for the reverse singles and then defeated Richard Fromberg. Bergström ended 1992 ranked number 58 in the world.

Bergström begun 1993 by making the final in Adelaide for the second year running, losing to fellow Swede Nicklas Kulti. At the Australian Open he became the first player to defeat Ivan Lendl in the first round of the Australian Open, and by so doing breaking Lendl's record run of 40 consecutive first round victories in Grand Slam appearances. After defeating the eighth seeded Lendl in die first round, he also defeated the world number eleven and tournament tenth seed, Wayne Ferreira before losing to Stefan Edberg in the quarter-finals. Bergström also made the quarter-finals in Beijing and the semi-finals in Båstad and Toulouse and ended the year ranked number 52 in the world.

=== 1994–1996 ===
1994 started less successful for Bergström and he only reaches two quarter-finals prior to the French Open, where he lost in the second round of the qualifying event. His first quarter-final was at the South African Open in Sun City, where he defeated his compatriot and the world number 10, Magnus Gustafsson. His second quarter-final appearance was at the AT&T Challenge in Atlanta. Bergström's best result of the year was at Wimbledon where he reached the quarter-finals for the second time in his career, with victories over Diego Nargiso, Greg Rusedski, Jordi Burillo and Bryan Shelton, before losing to Boris Becker.

Bergström started 1995 with a ranking of 112, but struggled to gain any momentum on the 1995 ATP Tour. He finished the year with only two match victories on the Tour and with an ATP ranking of number 259 in world. His best result was on the Challenger Tour, where he had to qualify for the main draw at the Tampere Open, and then made the final before losing to Galo Blanco.

In 1996 Bergström participated on ITF Satellite circuit and during April won the Germany 1 Circuit. He made his last appearance at an ATP Tour event at his hometown tournament, the Swedish Open in Båstad where he made the main draw as a lucky loser and then lost in the first round to Richard Fromberg.

== ATP career finals ==
=== Singles: 2 (0–2) ===
Result	No.	Date	Tournament	Surface	Opponent	Score
Loss	1.	Jan 1992	Adelaide, Australia	Hard	(Croatia) Goran Ivanišević	6–1, 6–7^{(5–7)}, 4–6
Loss	2.	Jan 1993	Adelaide, Australia	Hard	(Sweden) Nicklas Kulti	6–3, 5–7, 4–6

=== Doubles: 1 (0–1) ===
Result	No.	Date	Tournament	Surface	Partner	Opponents	Score
Loss	1.	Jul 1992	Båstad, Sweden	Clay	(Sweden) Magnus Gustafsson	(Spain) Tomas Carbonell (Argentina) Christian Miniussi	4–6, 5–7

== Challenger titles ==
=== Singles: (2) ===
No.	Date	Tournament	Surface	Opponent	Score
1.	Jun 1986	Tampere, Finland	Clay	(Italy) Massimo Cierro	4–6, 7–5, 6–4
2.	Apr 1987	Porto, Portugal	Clay	(Austria) Alex Antonitsch	6–1, 6–3

== See also ==
- List of Sweden Davis Cup team representatives
