= Byron Black =

Zimbabwean tennis player (born 1969)

- Country (sports): Zimbabwe
- Residence: White River, Mpumalanga, South Africa
- Born: 6 October 1969 (age 56) Salisbury, Rhodesia (now Harare, Zimbabwe)
- Height: 1.75 m (5 ft 9 in)
- Turned pro: 1991
- Retired: 2002
- Plays: Right-handed (two-handed both sides)
- Prize money: $5,159,775

Singles
- Career record: 257–246
- Career titles: 2
- Highest ranking: No. 22 (29 April 1996)

Grand Slam singles results
- Australian Open: 4R (1998)
- French Open: 3R (1999)
- Wimbledon: QF (2000)
- US Open: QF (1995)

Other tournaments
- Grand Slam Cup: QF (1995)
- Olympic Games: 2R (1996)

Doubles
- Career record: 328–201
- Career titles: 22
- Highest ranking: No. 1 (14 February 1994)

Grand Slam doubles results
- Australian Open: F (1994, 2001)
- French Open: W (1994)
- Wimbledon: F (1996)
- US Open: SF (1999)

Byron Hamish Black (born 6 October 1969) is a Zimbabwean tennis and Davis Cup player for Zimbabwe.

== Personal life ==
Born 6 October 1969, in Harare, Black is the son of Donald Black and Velia Black and brother to Wayne Black and Cara, who were also professional tennis players. He is married to Fiona Black, and has children. He attended the University of Southern California and was named an All-American by the Intercollegiate Tennis Association (ITA).

== Tennis career ==
Black started playing tennis at a young age at his father's grass court in Highlands, and played the game for Lewisham Primary School in his hometown. He played for the tennis team when he moved to the Oriel Boys High School, where he was exposed to other future Davis Cup players for Zimbabwe, like Greig Rodgers and Mark Gurr.

=== Pro tour ===
In 1995, Black was a US Open quarterfinalist, and in 2000, he reached the same round at Wimbledon. His career-high singles ranking was world No. 22, which he achieved in June 1996.

An accomplished doubles player, Black became world No. 1 in doubles in February 1994. He won the 1994 French Open partnering Jonathan Stark. Black was a doubles finalist in three other majors, the 1994 and 2001 Australian Opens and the 1996 Wimbledon Championships.

Black is one of the few professional players to have played with a double-handed forehand.

Black formed the core of the Zimbabwe Davis Cup team with his brother Wayne.

== Career finals ==
=== Singles: 10 (2 titles, 8 runner-ups) ===
Result	W-L	Date	Tournament	Surface	Opponent	Score
Loss	0–1	Jan 1996	Adelaide, Australia	Hard	(Russia) Yevgeny Kafelnikov	6–7, 6–3, 1–6
Loss	0–2	Apr 1996	New Delhi, India	Hard	(Sweden) Thomas Enqvist	2–6, 6–7
Win	1–2	Apr 1996	Seoul, South Korea	Hard	(Czech Republic) Martin Damm	7–6, 6–3
Loss	1–3	Apr 1998	Hong Kong	Hard	(Denmark) Kenneth Carlsen	2–6, 0–6
Loss	1–4	Apr 1998	Tokyo, Japan	Hard	(Romania) Andrei Pavel	3–6, 4–6
Loss	1–5	Jun 1998	Nottingham, England	Grass	(Sweden) Jonas Björkman	3–6, 2–6
Win	2–5	Apr 1999	Chennai, India	Hard	(Germany) Rainer Schüttler	6–4, 1–6, 6–3
Loss	2–6	Nov 1999	Moscow, Russia	Carpet (i)	(Russia) Yevgeny Kafelnikov	6–7, 4–6
Loss	2–7	Feb 2000	Memphis, U.S.	Hard (i)	(Sweden) Magnus Larsson	2–6, 6–1, 3–6
Loss	2–8	Jun 2000	Nottingham, England	Grass	(France) Sébastien Grosjean	6–7, 3–6

=== Doubles: 41 (22 titles / 19 runner-ups) ===
Legend Grand Slam (1–3) ATP Masters Series (5–5) ATP Championship Series (3–4) ATP Tour (13–7)	Finals by surface Hard (14–12) Clay (4–2) Grass (1–2) Carpet (3–3)

Result	W-L	Date	Tournament	Surface	Partner	Opponents	Score
Loss	0–1	Apr 1992	Hong Kong	Hard	(South Africa) Byron Talbot	(United States) Brad Gilbert (United States) Jim Grabb	2–6, 1–6
Win	1–1	Apr 1993	Durban, South Africa	Hard	(South Africa) Lan Bale	(South Africa) Johan de Beer (South Africa) Marcos Ondruska	7–6, 6–2
Loss	1–2	Jul 1993	Newport, U.S.	Grass	(United States) Jim Pugh	(Argentina) Javier Frana (South Africa) Christo van Rensburg	6–4, 1–6, 6–7
Win	2–2	Jul 1993	Washington, D.C., U.S.	Hard	(United States) Rick Leach	(Canada) Grant Connell (United States) Patrick Galbraith	6–4, 7–5
Loss	2–3	Aug 1993	Schenectady, U.S.	Hard	(New Zealand) Brett Steven	(Germany) Bernd Karbacher (Russia) Andrei Olhovskiy	6–2, 6–7, 1–6
Win	3–3	Oct 1993	Basel, Switzerland	Hard (i)	(United States) Jonathan Stark	(United States) Brad Pearce (United States) Dave Randall	3–6, 7–5, 6–3
Win	4–3	Oct 1993	Toulouse, France	Hard (i)	(United States) Jonathan Stark	(Germany) David Prinosil (Germany) Udo Riglewski	7–5, 7–6
Win	5–3	Oct 1993	Vienna, Austria	Carpet (i)	(United States) Jonathan Stark	(United States) Mike Bauer (Germany) David Prinosil	6–3, 7–6
Win	6–3	Nov 1993	Paris, France	Carpet (i)	(United States) Jonathan Stark	(Netherlands) Tom Nijssen (Czech Republic) Cyril Suk	4–6, 7–5, 6–2
Loss	6–4	Jan 1994	Adelaide, Australia	Hard	(South Africa) David Adams	(Australia) Mark Kratzmann (Australia) Andrew Kratzmann	4–6, 3–6
Loss	6–5	Jan 1994	Australian Open, Melbourne	Hard	(United States) Jonathan Stark	(Netherlands) Jacco Eltingh (Netherlands) Paul Haarhuis	7–6, 3–6, 4–6, 3–6
Loss	6–6	Feb 1994	San Jose, U.S.	Hard (i)	(United States) Jonathan Stark	(United States) Rick Leach (United States) Jared Palmer	6–4, 4–6, 4–6
Win	7–6	Feb 1994	Memphis, U.S.	Hard (i)	(United States) Jonathan Stark	(United States) Jim Grabb (United States) Jared Palmer	7–6, 6–4
Loss	7–7	Feb 1994	Indian Wells, U.S.	Hard	(United States) Jonathan Stark	(Canada) Grant Connell (United States) Patrick Galbraith	5–7, 3–6
Win	8–7	Jun 1994	French Open, Paris	Clay	(United States) Jonathan Stark	(Sweden) Jan Apell (Sweden) Jonas Björkman	6–4, 7–6
Win	9–7	Aug 1994	Toronto, Canada	Hard	(United States) Jonathan Stark	(United States) Patrick McEnroe (United States) Jared Palmer	6–4, 6–4
Loss	9–8	Oct 1994	Sydney Indoor, Australia	Hard (i)	(United States) Jonathan Stark	(Netherlands) Jacco Eltingh (Netherlands) Paul Haarhuis	4–6, 6–7
Loss	9–9	Oct 1994	Tokyo Indoor, Japan	Hard (i)	(United States) Jonathan Stark	(Canada) Grant Connell (United States) Patrick Galbraith	3–6, 6–3, 4–6
Loss	9–10	Nov 1994	Paris, France	Carpet (i)	(United States) Jonathan Stark	(Netherlands) Jacco Eltingh (Netherlands) Paul Haarhuis	6–3, 6–7, 5–7
Loss	9–11	Jan 1995	Adelaide, Australia	Hard	(Canada) Grant Connell	(United States) Jim Courier (Australia) Patrick Rafter	6–7, 4–6
Loss	9–12	May 1995	Hamburg, Germany	Clay	(Russia) Andrei Olhovskiy	(South Africa) Wayne Ferreira (Russia) Yevgeny Kafelnikov	1–6, 6–7
Win	10–12	May 1995	Bologna, Italy	Clay	(United States) Jonathan Stark	(Belgium) Libor Pimek (United States) Vince Spadea	7–5, 6–3
Win	11–12	Nov 1995	Moscow, Russia	Carpet (i)	(United States) Jonathan Stark	(United States) Tommy Ho (New Zealand) Brett Steven	6–4, 3–6, 6–3
Win	12–12	Feb 1996	Dubai, UAE	Hard	(Canada) Grant Connell	(Czech Republic) Karel Nováček (Czech Republic) Jiří Novák	6–0, 6–1
Loss	12–13	Mar 1996	Philadelphia, U.S.	Carpet (i)	(Canada) Grant Connell	(Australia) Todd Woodbridge (Australia) Mark Woodforde	6–7, 2–6
Loss	12–14	Apr 1996	New Delhi, India	Hard	(Australia) Sandon Stolle	(Sweden) Jonas Björkman (Sweden) Nicklas Kulti	6–4, 4–6, 4–6
Win	13–14	May 1996	Rome, Italy	Clay	(Canada) Grant Connell	(Belgium) Libor Pimek (South Africa) Byron Talbot	6–2, 6–3
Win	14–14	Jun 1996	Halle, Germany	Grass	(Canada) Grant Connell	(Russia) Yevgeny Kafelnikov (Czech Republic) Daniel Vacek	6–1, 7–5
Loss	14–15	Jul 1996	Wimbledon, England	Grass	(Canada) Grant Connell	(Australia) Todd Woodbridge (Australia) Mark Woodforde	6–4, 1–6, 3–6, 2–6
Win	15–15	Aug 1996	New Haven, U.S.	Hard	(Canada) Grant Connell	(Sweden) Jonas Björkman (Sweden) Nicklas Kulti	6–4, 6–4
Loss	15–16	May 1997	Rome, Italy	Clay	(United States) Alex O'Brien	(The Bahamas) Mark Knowles (Canada) Daniel Nestor	3–6, 6–4, 5–7
Win	16–16	Apr 1998	Hong Kong	Hard	(United States) Alex O'Brien	(South Africa) Neville Godwin (Finland) Tuomas Ketola	7–5, 6–1
Loss	16–17	Mar 1999	London, England	Carpet (i)	(South Africa) Wayne Ferreira	(United Kingdom) Tim Henman (United Kingdom) Greg Rusedski	3–6, 6–7^{(6–8)}
Win	17–17	Aug 1999	Los Angeles, U.S.	Hard	(South Africa) Wayne Ferreira	(Croatia) Goran Ivanišević (United States) Brian MacPhie	6–2, 7–6^{(7–4)}
Loss	17–18	Aug 1999	Montreal, Canada	Hard	(South Africa) Wayne Ferreira	(Sweden) Jonas Björkman (Australia) Patrick Rafter	6–7^{(5–7)}, 4–6
Win	18–18	Aug 1999	Cincinnati, U.S.	Hard	(Sweden) Jonas Björkman	(Australia) Todd Woodbridge (Australia) Mark Woodforde	6–3, 7–6^{(8–6)}
Win	19–18	Nov 1999	Stuttgart Indoor, Germany	Hard (i)	(Sweden) Jonas Björkman	(South Africa) David Adams (South Africa) John-Laffnie de Jager	6–7^{(6–8)}, 7–6^{(7–2)}, 6–0
Win	20–18	Feb 2000	Mexico City, Mexico	Clay	(United States) Donald Johnson	(Argentina) Gastón Etlis (Argentina) Martín Rodríguez	6–3, 7–5
Win	21–18	Jan 2001	Chennai, India	Hard	(Zimbabwe) Wayne Black	(United Kingdom) Barry Cowan (Italy) Mosé Navarra	6–4, 6–3
Loss	21–19	Jan 2001	Australian Open, Melbourne	Hard	(Germany) David Prinosil	(Sweden) Jonas Björkman (Australia) Todd Woodbridge	1–6, 7–5, 4–6, 4–6
Win	22–19	Sep 2001	Shanghai, China	Hard	(Japan) Thomas Shimada	(South Africa) John-Laffnie de Jager (South Africa) Robbie Koenig	6–2, 3–6, 7–5

== Performance timelines ==
Key
W	F	SF	QF	#R	RR	Q#	DNQ	A	NH

(W) winner; (F) finalist; (SF) semifinalist; (QF) quarterfinalist; (#R) rounds 4, 3, 2, 1; (RR) round-robin stage; (Q#) qualification round; (DNQ) did not qualify; (A) absent; (NH) not held; (SR) strike rate (events won / competed); (W–L) win–loss record.

=== Doubles ===
Tournament	1989	1990	1991	1992	1993	1994	1995	1996	1997	1998	1999	2000	2001	2002	Career SR	Career win–loss
Grand Slam tournaments
Australian Open	A	A	A	2R	1R	F	1R	2R	3R	1R	2R	2R	F	3R	0 / 11	18–11
French Open	A	A	A	1R	1R	W	2R	2R	1R	1R	2R	2R	1R	3R	1 / 11	12–10
Wimbledon	A	A	2R	1R	QF	3R	3R	F	2R	1R	1R	3R	1R	2R	0 / 12	17–12
US Open	2R	A	A	1R	2R	3R	QF	1R	1R	3R	SF	1R	2R	A	0 / 11	14–11
Grand Slam SR	0 / 1	0 / 0	0 / 1	0 / 4	0 / 4	1 / 4	0 / 4	0 / 4	0 / 4	0 / 4	0 / 4	0 / 4	0 / 4	0 / 3	1 / 45	N/A
Annual win–loss	1–1	0–0	1–1	1–4	4–4	15–3	6–4	7–4	3–4	2–4	6–4	4–4	6–4	5–3	N/A	61–44
ATP Masters Series
Indian Wells	NME	2R	A	A	A	F	2R	SF	2R	2R	1R	1R	QF	A	0 / 9	9–8
Miami	NME	A	A	A	SF	SF	SF	SF	QF	3R	1R	QF	2R	A	0 / 9	17–9
Monte Carlo	NME	A	A	A	A	A	2R	A	A	A	A	A	A	A	0 / 1	0–1
Rome	NME	A	A	A	A	A	1R	W	F	A	A	QF	A	A	1 / 4	11–3
Hamburg	NME	A	A	A	A	A	F	A	A	A	A	2R	A	A	0 / 2	4–2
Canada	NME	A	A	A	2R	W	2R	QF	1R	1R	F	A	1R	A	1 / 8	9–7
Cincinnati	NME	A	A	A	A	QF	SF	QF	1R	1R	W	A	2R	A	1 / 7	10–6
Stuttgart (Stockholm)	NME	A	A	A	A	A	QF	2R	A	1R	W	A	A	A	1 / 4	5–3
Paris	NME	A	A	A	W	F	2R	SF	1R	2R	2R	1R	A	A	1/ 8	11–7
Masters Series SR	N/A	0 / 1	0 / 0	0 / 0	1 / 3	1 / 5	0 / 9	1 / 7	0 / 6	0 / 6	2 / 6	0 / 5	0 / 4	0 / 0	5 / 52	N/A
Annual win–loss	N/A	1–0	0–0	0–0	9–2	14–4	9–9	12–6	6–6	4–6	13–4	5–5	3–4	0–0	N/A	76–46
Year-end ranking	586	381	149	90	5	6	18	4	70	70	10	53	34	106	N/A	
