= Nicklas Kulti =

Swedish tennis player

- Country (sports): Sweden
- Residence: Stockholm, Sweden
- Born: 22 April 1971 (age 55) Stockholm, Sweden
- Height: 1.91 m (6 ft 3 in)
- Turned pro: 1989
- Retired: 2000
- Plays: Right-handed (two-handed backhand)
- Prize money: US$3,186,946

Singles
- Career record: 154–182
- Career titles: 3
- Highest ranking: No. 32 (3 May 1993)

Grand Slam singles results
- Australian Open: 3R (1989, 1994, 1996)
- French Open: QF (1992)
- Wimbledon: 2R (1992, 1997)
- US Open: 2R (1993, 1994)

Other tournaments
- Grand Slam Cup: 1R (1992)

Doubles
- Career record: 238–145
- Career titles: 13
- Highest ranking: No. 11 (29 September 1997)

Grand Slam doubles results
- Australian Open: 3R (1997, 1999, 2000)
- French Open: F (1995)
- Wimbledon: SF (2000)
- US Open: F (1997)

Grand Slam mixed doubles results
- Australian Open: QF (1999)
- French Open: 3R (2000)
- Wimbledon: 2R (2000)
- US Open: QF (2000)

Team competitions
- Davis Cup: W (1997, 1998)
- Last updated on: 18 December 2021.

Nicklas Kulti (born 22 April 1971) is a former professional tennis player from Sweden. He was born in Stockholm. His career-high rankings were World No. 32 in singles in 1993, and No. 11 in doubles in 1997. Kulti was ranked No. 1 in the junior singles rankings in 1989.

== Tennis career ==
=== Juniors ===
Kulti was ranked No. 1 in the junior world singles rankings in 1989 after winning the Australian Open and Wimbledon junior titles, and finishing runner-up at the US Open.

=== Pro tour ===
In 1991, Kulti won his first top-level singles title at Adelaide. He won a total of three tour singles titles during his professional career. He also won 13 top-level doubles titles, including the Monte Carlo Masters in 1994 (partnering Magnus Larsson) and the Paris Masters in 2000 (partnering Max Mirnyi). Kulti was a men's doubles runner-up at the French Open in 1995 (with Larsson) and the US Open in 1997 (with Jonas Björkman). Kulti's best singles performance at a Grand Slam event came at the 1992 French Open, where he reached the quarter-finals by defeating John McEnroe, Markus Zillner, Michael Chang and Diego Pérez before being knocked-out by Henri Leconte.

Kulti was a member of the Swedish teams which won the Davis Cup in both 1997 and 1998 (partnering Björkman to win doubles rubbers in the final on both occasions). He was also on the team which finished runners-up in the Davis Cup in 1996. In the fifth and deciding match against Frenchman Arnaud Boetsch, Kulti was a late replacement for the injured Stefan Edberg. In a 4-hour and 46-minute thriller, Boetsch saved three matchpoints and finally overcame Kulti, 7–6, 2–6, 4–6, 7–6, 10–8.

=== Post-retirement career ===
He runs the Good to Great Tennis Academy together with Magnus Norman and Mikael Tillström.

== Junior Grand Slam finals ==
=== Singles: 4 (2 titles, 2 runner-ups) ===
Result	Year	Tournament	Surface	Opponent	Score
Loss	1988	US Open	Hard	(Venezuela) Nicolás Pereira	1–6, 2–6
Win	1989	Australian Open	Hard	(Australia) Todd Woodbridge	6–2, 6–3
Win	1989	Wimbledon	Grass	(Australia) Todd Woodbridge	6–4, 6–3
Loss	1989	US Open	Hard	(United States) Jonathan Stark	4–6, 1–6

== ATP career finals ==
=== Singles: 7 (3 titles, 4 runner-ups) ===
Legend Grand Slam Tournaments (0–0) ATP World Tour Finals (0–0) ATP World Tour Masters Series (0–0) ATP Championship Series (0–0) ATP World Series (3–4)	Finals by surface Hard (2–0) Clay (0–2) Grass (1–1) Carpet (0–1)	Finals by setting Outdoors (3–3) Indoors (0–1)

Result	W–L	Date	Tournament	Tier	Surface	Opponent	Score
Loss	0–1	Aug 1990	Prague, Czech Republic	World Series	Clay	(Spain) Jordi Arrese	6–7^{(3–7)}, 6–7^{(6–8)}
Win	1–1	Jan 1991	Adelaide, Australia	World Series	Hard	(Germany) Michael Stich	6–3, 1–6, 6–2
Win	2–1	Jan 1993	Adelaide, Australia	World Series	Hard	(Sweden) Christian Bergström	3–6, 7–5, 6–4
Loss	2–2	Mar 1993	Copenhagen, Denmark	World Series	Carpet	(Russia) Andrei Olhovskiy	5–7, 6–3, 2–6
Loss	2–3	Apr 1996	Atlanta, United States	World Series	Clay	(Morocco) Karim Alami	3–6, 4–6
Win	3–3	Jun 1996	Halle, Germany	World Series	Grass	(Russia) Yevgeny Kafelnikov	6–7^{(5–7)}, 6–3, 6–4
Loss	3–4	Jun 1999	Halle, Germany	World Series	Grass	(Germany) Nicolas Kiefer	3–6, 2–6

=== Doubles: 25 (13 titles, 12 runner-ups) ===
Legend Grand Slam Tournaments (0–2) ATP World Tour Finals (0–0) ATP Masters Series (2–1) ATP Championship Series (2–2) ATP World Series (9–7)	Finals by surface Hard (2–4) Clay (6–6) Grass (1–0) Carpet (4–2)	Finals by setting Outdoors (8–10) Indoors (5–2)

Result	W–L	Date	Tournament	Tier	Surface	Partner	Opponents	Score
Win	1–0	Mar 1992	Copenhagen, Denmark	World Series	Carpet	(Sweden) Magnus Larsson	(Netherlands) Hendrik Jan Davids (Belgium) Libor Pimek	6–3, 6–4
Win	2–0	Aug 1992	San Marino, San Marino	World Series	Clay	(Sweden) Mikael Tillström	(Italy) Cristian Brandi (Italy) Federico Mordegan	6–2, 6–2
Win	3–0	Apr 1994	Monte Carlo, Monaco	Masters Series	Clay	(Sweden) Magnus Larsson	(Russia) Yevgeny Kafelnikov (Czech Republic) Daniel Vacek	3–6, 7–6, 6–4
Loss	3–1	Jan 1994	Båstad, Sweden	World Series	Clay	(Sweden) Mikael Tillström	(Sweden) Jan Apell (Sweden) Jonas Björkman	2–6, 3–6
Loss	3–2	Oct 1994	Kuala Lumpur, Malaysia	World Series	Carpet	(Sweden) Lars-Anders Wahlgren	(Netherlands) Jacco Eltingh (Netherlands) Paul Haarhuis	0–6, 5–7
Loss	3–3	Jun 1995	Paris, France	Grand Slam	Clay	(Sweden) Magnus Larsson	(Netherlands) Jacco Eltingh (Netherlands) Paul Haarhuis	7–6, 4–6, 1–6
Win	4–3	Feb 1996	Antwerp, Nelgium	Championship Series	Carpet	(Sweden) Jonas Björkman	(Russia) Yevgeny Kafelnikov (Netherlands) Menno Oosting	6–4, 6–4
Loss	4–4	Mar 1996	St. Petersburg, Russia	World Series	Carpet	(Sweden) Peter Nyborg	(Russia) Yevgeny Kafelnikov (Russia) Andrei Olhovskiy	3–6, 4–6
Win	5–4	Apr 1996	New Delhi, India	World Series	Hard	(Sweden) Jonas Björkman	(Zimbabwe) Byron Black (Australia) Sandon Stolle	4–6, 6–4, 6–4
Loss	5–5	Apr 1996	Monte Carlo, Monaco	Masters Series	Clay	(Sweden) Jonas Björkman	(South Africa) Ellis Ferreira (Netherlands) Jan Siemerink	6–2, 3–6, 2–6
Loss	5–6	Mar 1996	Los Angeles, United States	World Series	Hard	(Sweden) Jonas Björkman	(South Africa) Marius Barnard (South Africa) Piet Norval	5–7, 2–6
Loss	5–7	Aug 1996	New Haven, United States	Championship Series	Hard	(Sweden) Jonas Björkman	(Zimbabwe) Byron Black (Canada) Grant Connell	4–6, 4–6
Win	6–7	May 1997	Atlanta, United States	World Series	Clay	(Sweden) Jonas Björkman	(United States) Scott Davis (United States) Kelly Jones	6–2, 7–6
Win	7–7	May 1997	Båstad, Sweden	World Series	Clay	(Sweden) Mikael Tillström	(Sweden) Magnus Larsson (Sweden) Magnus Gustafsson	6–0, 6–3
Loss	7–8	Aug 1997	Indianapolis, United States	Championship Series	Hard	(Sweden) Jonas Björkman	(Australia) Michael Tebbutt (Sweden) Mikael Tillström	1–6, 1–6
Loss	7–9	Aug 1997	New York, United States	Grand Slam	Hard	(Sweden) Jonas Björkman	(Russia) Yevgeny Kafelnikov (Czech Republic) Daniel Vacek	76–7, 3–6
Win	8–9	Feb 1998	St. Petersburg, Russia	World Series	Carpet	(Sweden) Mikael Tillström	(South Africa) Marius Barnard (South Africa) Brent Haygarth	3–6, 6–3, 7–6
Loss	8–10	May 1998	Prague, Czech Republic	World Series	Clay	(Sweden) Fredrik Bergh	(Australia) Wayne Arthurs (Australia) Andrew Kratzmann	1–6, 1–6
Win	9–10	Nov 1998	Stockholm, Sweden	International Series	Hard	(Sweden) Mikael Tillström	(South Africa) Chris Haggard (Sweden) Peter Nyborg	7–5, 3–6, 7–5
Loss	9–11	Jul 1999	Båstad, Sweden	World Series	Clay	(Sweden) Mikael Tillström	(South Africa) David Adams (United States) Jeff Tarango	6–7^{(6–8)}, 4–6
Loss	9–12	Sep 1999	Bournemouth, United Kingdom	World Series	Clay	(Germany) Michael Kohlmann	(South Africa) David Adams (United States) Jeff Tarango	3–6, 7–6^{(7–5)}, 6–7^{(5–7)}
Win	10–12	Apr 2000	Barcelona, Spain	Championship Series	Clay	(Sweden) Mikael Tillström	(Netherlands) Paul Haarhuis (Australia) Sandon Stolle	6–2, 6–7^{(2–7)}, 7–6^{(7–5)}
Win	11–12	Jun 2000	Halle, Germany	International Series	Grass	(Sweden) Mikael Tillström	(India) Mahesh Bhupathi (Germany) David Prinosil	7–6^{(7–4)}, 7–6^{(7–4)}
Win	12–12	Jul 2000	Båstad, Sweden	International Series	Clay	(Sweden) Mikael Tillström	(Italy) Andrea Gaudenzi (Italy) Diego Nargiso	4–6, 6–2, 6–3
Win	13–12	Nov 2000	Paris, France	Masters Series	Carpet	(Belarus) Max Mirnyi	(Netherlands) Paul Haarhuis (Canada) Daniel Nestor	6–4, 7–5

== ATP Challenger and ITF Futures finals ==
=== Singles: 1 (0–1) ===
Legend ATP Challenger (0–1) ITF Futures (0–0)	Finals by surface Hard (0–0) Clay (0–0) Grass (0–0) Carpet (0–1)

Result	W–L	Date	Tournament	Tier	Surface	Opponent	Score
Loss	0–1	Feb 1993	Rennes, France	Challenger	Carpet	(France) Stéphane Simian	4–6, 6–7

=== Doubles: 7 (6–1) ===
Legend ATP Challenger (6–1) ITF Futures (0–0)	Finals by surface Hard (2–0) Clay (3–1) Grass (0–0) Carpet (1–0)

Result	W–L	Date	Tournament	Tier	Surface	Partner	Opponents	Score
Loss	0–1	Aug 1989	Pescara, Italy	Challenger	Clay	(Sweden) Magnus Larsson	(Sweden) Fredrik Nilsson (Sweden) David Engel	2–6, 6–4, 6–7
Win	1–1	Nov 1989	Copenhagen, Denmark	Challenger	Carpet	(Sweden) Magnus Larsson	(Austria) Alex Antonitsch (Sweden) Ronnie Båthman	6–3, 6–2
Win	2–1	Mar 1995	Indian Wells, United States	Challenger	Hard	(Sweden) Mikael Tillström	(Sweden) Jan Apell (United States) Mike Bauer	7–6, 6–4
Win	3–1	Apr 1995	Monte Carlo, Monaco	Challenger	Clay	(Sweden) Mikael Tillström	(Germany) Nicolas Kiefer (Germany) Michael Stich	7–5, 7–5
Win	4–1	May 1995	Ljubljana, Slovenia	Challenger	Clay	(Sweden) Mikael Tillström	(United States) Shelby Cannon (South Africa) Stefan Kruger	6–4, 6–4
Win	5–1	Jul 1995	Braunschweig, Germany	Challenger	Clay	(Sweden) Mikael Tillström	(United States) Bill Behrens (South Africa) Brendan Curry	7–6, 6–4
Win	6–1	Mar 1997	Indian Wells, United States	Challenger	Hard	(Australia) Michael Tebbutt	(United States) Scott Davis (United States) Kelly Jones	6–2, 4–6, 6–3

== Performance timelines ==
Key
W	F	SF	QF	#R	RR	Q#	DNQ	A	NH

(W) winner; (F) finalist; (SF) semifinalist; (QF) quarterfinalist; (#R) rounds 4, 3, 2, 1; (RR) round-robin stage; (Q#) qualification round; (DNQ) did not qualify; (A) absent; (NH) not held; (SR) strike rate (events won / competed); (W–L) win–loss record.

=== Singles ===
Tournament	1989	1990	1991	1992	1993	1994	1995	1996	1997	1998	1999	2000	SR	W–L	Win %
Grand Slam tournaments
Australian Open	3R	1R	1R	2R	2R	3R	2R	3R	2R	Q1	Q1	1R	0 / 10	10–10	50%
French Open	1R	3R	2R	QF	1R	2R	Q3	1R	1R	Q1	A	A	0 / 8	8–8	50%
Wimbledon	Q3	A	1R	2R	1R	1R	A	1R	2R	Q2	A	Q2	0 / 6	2–6	25%
US Open	A	A	1R	1R	2R	2R	1R	1R	Q1	A	1R	A	0 / 7	2–7	22%
Win–loss	2–2	2–2	1–4	6–4	2–4	4–4	1–2	2–4	2–3	0–0	0–1	0–1	0 / 31	22–31	42%
Year-end Championships
Grand Slam Cup	NH	DNQ		1R	Did not qualify							NH	0 / 1	0–1	0%
ATP Masters Series
Indian Wells	A	A	A	A	A	1R	Q2	A	2R	A	A	A	0 / 2	1–2	33%
Miami	1R	A	A	A	4R	2R	Q3	A	4R	A	A	A	0 / 4	6–4	60%
Monte Carlo	A	A	1R	A	1R	1R	Q2	Q3	1R	Q2	A	A	0 / 4	0–4	0%
Hamburg	A	A	1R	A	A	1R	A	A	A	A	A	A	0 / 2	0–2	0%
Rome	A	A	2R	1R	2R	1R	A	A	A	Q1	A	Q1	0 / 4	2–4	33%
Canada	A	A	A	A	A	A	A	1R	A	A	A	A	0 / 1	0–1	0%
Cincinnati	A	A	A	A	A	1R	A	1R	Q2	A	A	A	0 / 2	0–2	0%
Paris	A	A	3R	1R	Q1	Q1	A	Q3	Q1	A	A	A	0 / 2	2–2	50%
Win–loss	0–1	0–0	3–4	0–2	3–3	1–6	0–0	0–2	4–3	0–0	0–0	0–0	0 / 21	11–21	34%

=== Doubles ===
Tournament	1989	1990	1991	1992	1993	1994	1995	1996	1997	1998	1999	2000	2001	SR	W–L	Win %
Grand Slam tournaments
Australian Open	A	A	A	A	A	A	1R	1R	3R	1R	3R	3R	2R	0 / 7	7–7	50%
French Open	A	A	1R	A	A	2R	F	QF	2R	1R	SF	3R	QF	0 / 9	19–9	68%
Wimbledon	Q1	A	Q1	A	A	2R	A	QF	QF	QF	1R	SF	A	0 / 6	14–6	70%
US Open	A	A	A	A	A	SF	3R	1R	F	3R	1R	3R	A	0 / 7	15–7	68%
Win–loss	0–0	0–0	0–1	0–0	0–0	6–3	7–3	6–4	11–4	5–4	6–4	10–4	4–2	0 / 29	55–29	65%
National Representation
Olympic Games	Not Held			A	Not Held			1R	Not Held			1R	NH	0 / 2	0–2	0%
Year-end Championships
ATP Finals	Did not qualify							RR	Did not qualify					0 / 1	1–2	33%
ATP Masters Series
Indian Wells	A	A	A	A	A	Q1	2R	A	QF	A	A	A	A	0 / 2	3–2	60%
Miami	A	A	A	A	A	A	2R	A	3R	A	SF	A	3R	0 / 4	7–4	64%
Monte Carlo	A	A	A	A	A	W	2R	F	SF	1R	A	QF	A	1 / 6	13–5	72%
Hamburg	A	A	A	A	A	QF	A	A	A	A	A	A	A	0 / 1	2–1	67%
Rome	A	A	A	A	A	A	A	A	A	2R	A	2R	A	0 / 2	2–2	50%
Canada	A	A	A	A	A	A	A	SF	A	A	A	A	A	0 / 1	3–1	75%
Cincinnati	A	A	A	A	A	1R	A	QF	A	A	A	A	A	0 / 2	2–2	50%
Stuttgart	A	A	A	A	A	A	A	A	A	1R	1R	1R	A	0 / 3	0–3	0%
Paris	A	A	A	A	A	2R	A	1R	2R	QF	A	W	A	1 / 5	7–4	64%
Win–loss	0–0	0–0	0–0	0–0	0–0	8–3	1–3	8–4	6–4	3–4	4–2	7–3	1–1	2 / 26	39–24	62%

=== Mixed doubles ===
Tournament	1998	1999	2000	2001	SR	W–L	Win %
Grand Slam tournaments
Australian Open	A	QF	A	1R	0 / 2	2–2	50%
French Open	A	2R	3R	2R	0 / 3	3–3	50%
Wimbledon	A	A	2R	A	0 / 1	1–1	50%
US Open	1R	A	QF	A	0 / 2	2–2	50%
Win–loss	0–1	3–2	4–3	1–2	0 / 8	8–8	50%
