= Stefan Kruger =

South African tennis player

- Country (sports): South Africa
- Residence: St. Louis, Missouri
- Born: 3 August 1966 (age 58); Cape Town, South Africa
- Height: 1.83 m (6 ft 0 in)
- Turned pro: 1987
- Retired: 1995
- Plays: Right-handed
- Prize money: $350,994

Singles
- Career record: 0–0
- Highest ranking: No. 277 (3 October 1988)

Doubles
- Career record: 103–129
- Career titles: 3
- Highest ranking: No. 39 (14 January 1991)

Grand Slam doubles results
- Australian Open: 3R (1989)
- French Open: 2R (1989, 1990, 1992)
- Wimbledon: SF (1990)
- US Open: 2R (1992, 1993)

Mixed doubles

Grand Slam mixed doubles results
- Australian Open: 2R (1989, 1991)
- French Open: 2R (1989, 1991)
- Wimbledon: 3R (1988, 1993)
- US Open: 2R (1993)

Stefan Kruger (born 3 August 1966) is a former professional tennis player from South Africa. He enjoyed most of his tennis success while playing doubles. During his career he won three doubles titles and finished runner-up an additional five times. He achieved a career-high doubles ranking of world No. 39 in 1991.

== Career finals ==
=== Doubles (3 titles, 5 runner-ups) ===
Result	W/L	Date	Tournament	Surface	Partner	Opponents	Score
Win	1–0	Jan 1989	Adelaide, Australia	Hard	(United Kingdom) Neil Broad	(Australia) Mark Kratzmann (United States) Glenn Layendecker	6–2, 7–6
Loss	1–1	Jul 1989	Newport, U.S.	Grass	(United Kingdom) Neil Broad	(United States) Patrick Galbraith (United States) Brian Garrow	6–2, 5–7, 3–6
Win	2–1	Sep 1990	Basel, Switzerland	Hard (i)	(South Africa) Christo van Rensburg	(United Kingdom) Neil Broad (South Africa) Gary Muller	4–6, 7–6, 6–3
Win	3–1	Jan 1991	Adelaide, Australia	Hard	(South Africa) Wayne Ferreira	(Netherlands) Paul Haarhuis (Netherlands) Mark Koevermans	6–4, 4–6, 6–4
Loss	3–2	Apr 1991	Singapore	Hard	(South Africa) Christo van Rensburg	(Canada) Grant Connell (Canada) Glenn Michibata	4–6, 7–5, 6–7
Loss	3–3	Oct 1992	Lyon, France	Carpet	(United Kingdom) Neil Broad	(Switzerland) Jakob Hlasek (Switzerland) Marc Rosset	1–6, 3–6
Loss	3–4	Jun 1993	Manchester, England	Grass	(Canada) Glenn Michibata	(United States) Ken Flach (United States) Rick Leach	4–6, 1–6
Loss	3–5	Oct 1993	Lyon, France	Carpet	(South Africa) John-Laffnie de Jager	(South Africa) Gary Muller (South Africa) Danie Visser	3–6, 6–7
