= Australian Hard Court Championships =

Defunct tennis tournament
- Event name: Australian Hard Court Championships (1938–2008)
- Tour: Pre open era (1938–1967); Independent tour (1968–1969); Grand Prix circuit (1970–90); WTA Tour (1973–2008); ATP Tour (1990–2008)
- Founded: 1938
- Editions: 63
- Location: Various cities on rotation
- Category: WTA Tier III (1993–2008)
- Surface: Clay (1938–1977); Hard (1978–2008)

The Australian Hard Court Championships was a former professional tennis tournament established in 1938 and held until 2008. The event was played on clay courts until 1977 when it switched to hard courts. The tournament was a combined event for men and women until the end of the 1980s. In 2009, Tennis Australia merged the separate men's and women's tournaments into a new combined tournament called the Brisbane International.

== History ==
=== Men's event ===
The Australian Men's Hard Court Championships began in Sydney in 1938. Throughout its history the championships were hosted in various cities around Australia. The tournament was played on clay until 1977. In 1978 the event switched to hardcourts and continued to be played on that surface until 1987. In the years 1987 and 1988, the tournament was held in conjunction with the South Australian Open. Between 1999 and 2004, the national title was held in conjunction with the AAPT Championships. In 2005, the tournament was held in conjunction with the Adelaide Next Generation Hard Courts. From 2006 until 2008, the tournament was held in conjunction with the Adelaide Next Generation International. In 2008, the tournament in Adelaide was discontinued and merged with the women's event into a new combined tournament called the Brisbane International.

=== Women's event ===
The Australian Women's Hard Court Championships event began alongside the men's in Sydney in 1938 and was also hosted in various cities around Australia throughout its history. The tournament was played on clay courts until 1977. In 1978 the event switched to hardcourts and continued to be played on that surface till 1987. Between 1989 and 1994, the event was held in conjunction with the Danone Hardcourt Championships. It was not staged in 1995 and 1996, but re-emerged in 1998 as a women's only event called the Thalgo Australian Women's Hard Courts (sponsored name) which was then held until 2002. In 2003, the tournament took the sponsorship of Uncle Tobys, and was named Uncle Tobys Hardcourts until 2005. Between 2006 and 2008, it was held as the Mondial Australian Women's Hardcourts (its sponsored name). In 2009 the tournament was discontinued and was merged with the men's event into a new combined tournament called the Brisbane International.

== Sponsors ==
Sponsors for the men's event included Eurovox and Goldair. Sponsors for the women's event included Danone, Uncle Tobys, Mondial, and Thalgo.

== Past finals ==
Past finals of the championship's events include:

=== Men's singles ===
Location	Year	Champion	Runner-up	Score
Sydney	1938	(Australia) Jack Crawford	(Australia) Vivian McGrath	2–6, 3–6, 6–2, 6–2, 6–4
Toowoomba	1939	(Australia) Vivian McGrath	(Australia) James Gilchrist	3–6, 7–5, 7–5, 6–0
Hobart	1940	(Australia) John Bromwich	(Australia) Jack Crawford	6–1, 4–6, 6–2, 6–2
	1941–1945	No event/WW2		
Sydney	1946	(Australia) Dinny Pails	(Australia) Geoff Brown	7–5, 6–2, 7–5
Toowoomba	1947	(Australia) Adrian Quist	(Australia) Frank Sedgman	6–3, 6–2, 6–3
Sydney	1948	(Australia) Adrian Quist	(Australia) Bill Sidwell	6–2, 6–1, 7–5
Sydney	1949	(Australia) Adrian Quist	(Australia) Geoff Brown	4–6, 8–6, 6–4, 6–0
Toowoomba	1950	(Australia) Frank Sedgman	(Australia) George Worthington	6–1, 6–0, 6–4
Launceston	1951	(Australia) Frank Sedgman	(Australia) Don Candy	6–3, 6–2, 6–2
Melbourne	1952	(Australia) Lew Hoad	(Australia) Ken Rosewall	2–6, 6–1, 1–6, 6–2, 11–9
Sydney	1953	(Australia) Lew Hoad	(Australia) John Bromwich	7–5, 6–3, 2–6, 9–7
Brisbane	1954	(Australia) Mervyn Rose	(Australia) Don Candy	7–5, 6–4, 6–2
Launceston	1955	(Australia) Ken Rosewall	(Australia) Neale Fraser	6–3, 5–7, 6–4, 2–6, 6–1
Melbourne	1956	(Australia) Ashley Cooper	(Australia) Mervyn Rose	7–5, 6–4, 9–11, 6–4
Melbourne	1957	(Australia) Ashley Cooper	(Australia) Neale Fraser	6–2, 4–6, 6–3, 6–3
Brisbane	1958	(Australia) Ashley Cooper	(Australia) Bob Mark	7–5, 6–2, 6–2
Melbourne	1959	(Australia) Neale Fraser	(Australia) Roy Emerson	6–2, 3–6, 12–10, 6–3
Hobart	1960	(Australia) Martin Mulligan	(South Africa) Bob Hewitt	6–1, 6–2, 4–6, 6–4
Hobart	1961	(South Africa) Bob Hewitt	(Australia) Rod Laver	6–4, 6–2, 5–7, 6–3
Brisbane	1962	(Australia) Rod Laver	(Australia) Fred Stolle	6–2, 2–6, 6–4, 4–6, 8–6
Melbourne	1963	(Australia) Neale Fraser	(Australia) Owen Davidson	6–2, 6–2, 6–4
Launceston	1964	(Australia) Martin Mulligan	(Australia) Fred Stolle	6–3, 6–4, 8–6
Sydney	1965	(Australia) John Newcombe	(Australia) Fred Stolle	4–6, 6–1, 6–1, 6–3
Sydney	1966	(Australia) Roy Emerson	(Australia) Tony Roche	6–3, 8–6, 4–6, 6–3
Melbourne	1967	(Australia) Tony Roche	(Australia) John Newcombe	5–7, 7–5, 6–2, 6–2
Open era
Sydney	1968	(Australia) Phil Dent	(Australia) Bob Giltinan	6–2, 6–4, 12–10
Sydney	1969	(Australia) Ray Ruffels	(Australia) Ian Fletcher	6–4, 6–4, 3–6, 5–7, 6–3
Toowoomba	1970	(Australia) Colin Dibley	(Australia) Bob Giltinan	6–3, 7–6, 6–4
Southport	1971	(Australia) Mal Anderson	(Australia) Geoff Masters	2–6, 6–0, 6–3, 6–2
Southport	1972	(Australia) Geoff Masters	(Australia) Mal Anderson	6–3, 6–7, 6–3, 7–5
Rockdale	1973	(Australia) Ross Case	(Australia) Kim Warwick	6–3, 6–1, 6–0
Gympie	1974	(West Germany) Ulrich Pinner	(Sweden) Kjell Johansson	6–3, 6–2, 4–6, 7–5
Melbourne	1975	(Australia) Peter McNamara	(Australia) John Marks	6–2, 6–2, 6–2
Sydney	1976	(Australia) Terry Rocavert	(Australia) Warren Maher	6–4, 6–7, 2–6, 7–6, 6–4
Melbourne	1977	(Australia) David Carter	(Australia) Mal Anderson	6–1, 6–3
	1978	No event		
Hobart	1979	(Argentina) Guillermo Vilas	(Australia) Mark Edmondson	6–4, 6–4
Hobart	1980	(Israel) Shlomo Glickstein	(United States) Robert Van't Hof	7–6, 6–4
Sydney	1981	(Australia) Kim Warwick	(Australia) Greg Whitecross	6–3, 7–6
Sydney	1982	(Australia) Pat Cash	(Australia) Craig A. Miller	7–5, 6–7, 6–2
Sydney	1983	(Australia) Simon Youl	(Australia) John Frawley	3–6, 7–5, 6–2
Sydney	1984	(Australia) Peter Doohan	(United States) Jonathan Canter	2–6, 6–3, 6–3
Sydney	1985	(Australia) Peter Doohan	(Australia) Bruce Derlin	6–4, 6–4
Sydney	1986	(Australia) Peter Doohan	(Australia) Desmond Tyson	6–3, 6–2
Sydney	1987	(Australia) John Frawley	(Australia) Johan Anderson	6–2, 6–3
Adelaide	1988	(Australia) Mark Woodforde	(Australia) Wally Masur	6–2, 6–4
Adelaide	1989	(Australia) Mark Woodforde	(West Germany) Patrik Kühnen	7–5, 1–6, 7–5
Adelaide	1990	(Austria) Thomas Muster	(United States) Jimmy Arias	3–6, 6–2, 7–5
Adelaide	1991	(Sweden) Nicklas Kulti	(Germany) Michael Stich	6–3, 1–6, 6–2
Adelaide	1992	(Croatia) Goran Ivanišević	(Sweden) Christian Bergström	1–6, 7–6^{(7–5)}, 6–4
Adelaide	1993	(Sweden) Nicklas Kulti	(Sweden) Christian Bergström	3–6, 7–5, 6–4
Adelaide	1994	(Russia) Yevgeny Kafelnikov	(Russia) Alexander Volkov	6–4, 6–3
Adelaide	1995	(United States) Jim Courier	(France) Arnaud Boetsch	6–2, 7–5
Adelaide	1996	(Russia) Yevgeny Kafelnikov	(Zimbabwe) Byron Black	7–6^{(7–0)}, 3–6, 6–1
Adelaide	1997	(Australia) Todd Woodbridge	(Australia) Scott Draper	6–2, 6–1
Adelaide	1998	(Australia) Lleyton Hewitt	(Australia) Jason Stoltenberg	3–6, 6–3, 7–6^{(7–4)}
Adelaide	1999	(Sweden) Thomas Enqvist	(Australia) Lleyton Hewitt	4–6, 6–1, 6–2
Adelaide	2000	(Australia) Lleyton Hewitt	(Sweden) Thomas Enqvist	3–6, 6–3, 6–2
Adelaide	2001	(Germany) Tommy Haas	(Chile) Nicolás Massú	6–3, 6–1
Adelaide	2002	(United Kingdom) Tim Henman	(Australia) Mark Philippoussis	6–4, 6–7^{(6–8)}, 6–3
Adelaide	2003	(Russia) Nikolay Davydenko	(Belgium) Kristof Vliegen	6–2, 7–6^{(7–3)}
Adelaide	2004	(Slovakia) Dominik Hrbatý	(France) Michaël Llodra	6–4, 6–0
Adelaide	2005	(Sweden) Joachim Johansson	(United States) Taylor Dent	7–5, 6–3
Adelaide	2006	(France) Florent Serra	(Belgium) Xavier Malisse	6–3, 6–4
Adelaide	2007	(Serbia) Novak Djokovic	(Australia) Chris Guccione	6–3, 6–7^{(6–8)}, 6–4
Adelaide	2008	(France) Michaël Llodra	(Finland) Jarkko Nieminen	6–3, 6–4
succeeded by Brisbane International

=== Women's singles ===
Location	Year	Champion	Runner up	Score
Sydney	1938	(Australia) Emily Hood Westacott	(Australia) May Hardcastle	7–5, 6–1
Toowoomba	1939	(Australia) May Hardcastle	(Australia) Thelma Coyne	6–3, 6–4
Hobart	1940	(Australia) Nell Hall Hopman	(Australia) Thelma Coyne	6–4, 3–6, 6–1
	1941–45	No event due to WW2		
Sydney	1946	(Australia) Nancye Wynne Bolton	(Australia) Dulcie Whittaker	7–5 6–1
Toowoomba	1947	(Australia) Thelma Coyne Long	(Australia) Mary Bevis	8–6, 6–3
Launceston	1948	(Australia) Nancye Wynne Bolton	(Australia) Sadie Berryman Newcombe	6–2, 6–3
Sydney	1949	(Australia) Mary Bevis	(Australia) Esme Ashford	6–1, 6–1
Toowoomba	1950	(Australia) Nancye Wynne Bolton	(Australia) Thelma Coyne Long	5–7, 6–3, 6–3
Launceston	1951	(Australia) Joyce Fitch	(Australia) Beryl Penrose	4–6, 7–5, 6–1
Sydney	1952	(Australia) Pam Southcombe	(Australia) Loris Nichols	6–4, 7–5
Sydney	1953	(Australia) Beryl Penrose	(Australia) Mary Bevis Hawton	6–2, 6–3
Brisbane	1954	(Australia) Jenny Staley	(Australia) Beryl Penrose	3–6, 6–0, 6–4
Launceston	1955	(Australia) Margaret Hellyer	(Australia) Pat Parmenter	6–4, 6–3
Melbourne	1956	(Australia) Mary Carter	(Australia) Marie Toomey Martin	7–5, 4–6, 6–1
Sydney	1957	(Australia) Beth Jones	(Australia) Mary Bevis Hawton	6–3, 4–6, 6–2
Brisbane	1958	(Australia) Lorraine Coghlan	(Australia) Mary Bevis Hawton	6–3, 6–3
Melbourne	1959	(Australia) Jan Lehane	(Australia) Lorraine Coghlan	6–0 2–6 6–2
Hobart	1960	(Australia) Lesley Turner	(Australia) Dawn Robberds	6–2, 6–2
Rockdale	1961	(Australia) Margaret Smith	(Australia) Lesley Turner	6–2, 0–6, 7–5
Brisbane	1962	(Australia) Lesley Turner	(Australia) Jan Lehane	4–6, 6–4, 6–4
Glen Iris	1963	(Australia) Joan Gibson	(Australia) Madonna Schacht	10–8, 6–3
Launceston	1964	(Australia) Madonna Schacht	(Australia) Gail Sherriff	1–6, 8–6, 10–8
Sydney	1965	(Australia) Lesley Turner	(Australia) Margaret Smith	7–5, 6–3
Brisbane	1966	(Australia) Karen Krantzcke	(Australia) Lexie Kenny	6–1, 6–2
Melbourne	1967	(Australia) Lesley Turner	(Australia) Kerry Melville	1–6, 7–5, 6–2
↓ Open era ↓
Launceston	1968	(Australia) Karen Krantzcke	(Australia) Evonne Goolagong	6–1, 6–1
Sydney	1969	(Australia) Kerry Melville	(Australia) Karen Krantzcke	6–3, 8–10, 6–1
Toowoomba	1970	(Australia) Evonne Goolagong	(Australia) Marilyn Tesch	6–3, 7–5
Southport	1971	(Australia) Evonne Goolagong	(United States) Mona Schallau	6–1, 6–1
Melbourne	1972	(Australia) Evonne Goolagong	(Australia) Pat Coleman	6–7, 6–2, 6–2
Rockdale	1973	(Australia) Dianne Fromholtz	(United States) Ann Kiyomura	6–1, 7–5
Gympie	1974	(Sweden) Helena Anliot	(Soviet Union) Natasha Chmyreva	6–1, 7–5
Melbourne	1975	(Australia) Judy Tegart Dalton	(Australia) Kym Ruddell	6–2, 6–3
Sydney	1976	(Australia) Dianne Fromholtz	(Australia) Leanne Harrison	6–1, 6–0
Brighton East	1977	(Australia) Sue Saliba	(Australia) Pam Whytcross	2–6, 7–6, 6–2
	1978	No event		
?	1979	(United States) Jill Davis	?	?
Hobart-Jan	1980	(Australia) Nerida Gregory	(Australia) Karen Gulley	7–5, 6–2
Hobart -Nov	1980	(Australia) Susan Leo	?	?
	1981	No event		
Sydney	1982	(Australia) Anne Minter	(Australia) Amanda Tobin Dingwall	6–4, 6–2
Sydney	1983	(Australia) Anne Minter	(Australia) Amanda Tobin Dingwall	6–3, 6–4
Sydney	1984	(Australia) Dianne Balestrat	(Sweden) Anneli Björk	6–3, 6–2
Sydney	1985	(Sweden) Helena Dahlström	(Sweden) Monica Lundqvist	6–4, 3–6, 7–6
Sydney	1986	(Australia) Nicole Provis	(Australia) Michelle Bowrey	6–3, 6–3
Auburn	1987	(Australia) Louise Stacey	(Australia) Jane Morro	0–6, 7–6, 6–2
	1988	No event		
Brisbane	1989	(Czech Republic) Helena Suková	(Netherlands) Brenda Schultz	7–6, 7–6
Brisbane	1990	(Soviet Union) Natasha Zvereva	(Australia) Rachel McQuillan	6–4, 6–0
Brisbane	1991	(Czech Republic) Helena Suková	(Japan) Akiko Kijimuta	6–4, 6–3
Brisbane	1992	(Australia) Nicole Provis	(Australia) Rachel McQuillan	6–3, 6–2
Brisbane	1993	(Spain) Conchita Martínez	(Bulgaria) Magdalena Maleeva	6–3, 6–4
Brisbane	1994	(United States) Lindsay Davenport	(Argentina) Florencia Labat	6–1, 2–6, 6–3
	1995–1996	No event		
Hope Island	1997	(Russia) Elena Likhovtseva	(Japan) Ai Sugiyama	3–6, 7–6, 6–3
Hope Island	1998	(Japan) Ai Sugiyama	(Venezuela) Maria Vento	7–5, 6–0
Hope Island	1999	(Switzerland) Patty Schnyder	(France) Mary Pierce	4–6, 7–6^{(7–5)}, 6–2
Gold Coast	2000	(Croatia) Silvija Talaja	(Spain) Conchita Martínez	6–1, 3–6, 6–0
Gold Coast	2001	(Belgium) Justine Henin	(Italy) Silvia Farina Elia	7–6^{(7–5)}, 6–4
Gold Coast	2002	(United States) Venus Williams	(Belgium) Justine Henin	7–5, 6–2
Gold Coast	2003	(France) Nathalie Dechy	(Switzerland) Marie-Gayanay Mikaelian	6–3, 3–6, 6–3
Gold Coast	2004	(Japan) Ai Sugiyama	(Russia) Nadia Petrova	1–6, 6–1, 6–4
Gold Coast	2005	(Switzerland) Patty Schnyder	(Australia) Samantha Stosur	1–6, 6–3, 7–5
Gold Coast	2006	(Czech Republic) Lucie Šafářová	(Italy) Flavia Pennetta	6–3, 6–4
Gold Coast	2007	(Russia) Dinara Safina	(Switzerland) Martina Hingis	6–3, 3–6, 7–5
Gold Coast	2008	(China) Li Na	(Belarus) Victoria Azarenka	4–6, 6–3, 6–4
succeeded by Brisbane International

=== Men's doubles ===
Location	Year	Champions	Runners-up	Score
Adelaide	1990	(United Kingdom) Andrew Castle (Nigeria) Nduka Odizor	(Germany) Alexander Mronz (Netherlands) Michiel Schapers	7–6, 6–2
Adelaide	1991	(South Africa) Wayne Ferreira (South Africa) Stefan Kruger	(Netherlands) Paul Haarhuis (Netherlands) Mark Koevermans	6–4, 4–6, 6–4
Adelaide	1992	(Croatia) Goran Ivanišević (Switzerland) Marc Rosset	(Australia) Mark Kratzmann (Australia) Jason Stoltenberg	7–6, 7–6
Adelaide	1993	(Australia) Todd Woodbridge (Australia) Mark Woodforde	(Australia) John Fitzgerald (Australia) Laurie Warder	6–4, 7–5
Adelaide	1994	(Australia) Mark Kratzmann (Australia) Andrew Kratzmann	(South Africa) David Adams (Zimbabwe) Byron Black	6–4, 6–3
Adelaide	1995	(United States) Jim Courier (Australia) Patrick Rafter	(Zimbabwe) Byron Black (Canada) Grant Connell	7–6, 6–4
Adelaide	1996	(Australia) Todd Woodbridge (Australia) Mark Woodforde	(Sweden) Jonas Björkman (United States) Tommy Ho	7–5, 7–6
Adelaide	1997	(Australia) Patrick Rafter (United States) Bryan Shelton	(Australia) Todd Woodbridge (Australia) Mark Woodforde	6–4, 1–6, 6–3
Adelaide	1998	(Australia) Joshua Eagle (Australia) Andrew Florent	(South Africa) Ellis Ferreira (United States) Rick Leach	6–4, 6–7, 6–3
Adelaide	1999	(Brazil) Gustavo Kuerten (Ecuador) Nicolás Lapentti	(United States) Jim Courier (United States) Patrick Galbraith	6–4, 6–4
Adelaide	2000	(Australia) Mark Woodforde (Australia) Todd Woodbridge	(Australia) Lleyton Hewitt (Australia) Sandon Stolle	6–4, 6–2
Adelaide	2001	(Australia) David Macpherson (South Africa) Grant Stafford	(Australia) Wayne Arthurs (Australia) Todd Woodbridge	6–7^{(5–7)}, 6–4, 6–4
Adelaide	2002	(Zimbabwe) Wayne Black (Zimbabwe) Kevin Ullyett	(United States) Bob Bryan (United States) Mike Bryan	7–5, 6–2
Adelaide	2003	(South Africa) Jeff Coetzee (South Africa) Chris Haggard	(Belarus) Max Mirnyi (United States) Jeff Morrison	2–6, 6–4, 7–6^{(9–7)}
Adelaide	2004	(United States) Bob Bryan (United States) Mike Bryan	(France) Arnaud Clément (France) Michaël Llodra	7–5, 6–3
Adelaide	2005	(Belgium) Xavier Malisse (Belgium) Olivier Rochus	(Sweden) Simon Aspelin (Australia) Todd Perry	7–6^{(7–5)}, 6–4
Adelaide	2006	(Israel) Jonathan Erlich (Israel) Andy Ram	(Australia) Paul Hanley (Zimbabwe) Kevin Ullyett	7–6^{(7–4)}, 7–6^{(12–10)}
Adelaide	2007	(South Africa) Wesley Moodie (Australia) Todd Perry	(Serbia) Novak Djokovic (Czech Republic) Radek Štěpánek	6–3, 4–6, [15–13]
Adelaide	2008	(Argentina) Martín García (Brazil) Marcelo Melo	(Australia) Chris Guccione (Australia) Robert Smeets	6–3, 3–6, [10–7]
succeeded by Brisbane International

=== Women's doubles ===
Location	Year	Champion	Runner up	Score
Sydney	1938	(Australia) Emily Hood Westacott (Australia) May Hardcastle	(Australia) Alison Hattersley (Australia) Vera Selwin	3–6, 6–1, 6–4
Toowoomba	1939	(Australia) Hayes (Australia) Farrell	(Australia) Emily Hood Westacott (Australia) May Hardcastle	4–6, 6–2, 6–2

== See also ==
- South Australian Championships
- Brisbane International
- Category:National and multi-national tennis tournaments

== Notes ==
Notes 1: From inception in 1938 the men's and women's events of the championships were hosted at the same locations and venues for most of its duration until 1986. Though there were a few exceptions after 1986, the name of the event- the (national title)- remained but the tournaments were separated into individual events for men and women until 2008.
Notes 2: As early as 1949, the (national championships) were occasionally held in conjunction with other tournaments which has been the case in more recent times.

== Sources ==
- Australian Hard Court Championships: Roll of Honour: Tournament draws
