= Broken Head Nature Reserve =

Protected area in New South Wales, Australia

- IUCN category Ia (strict nature reserve)
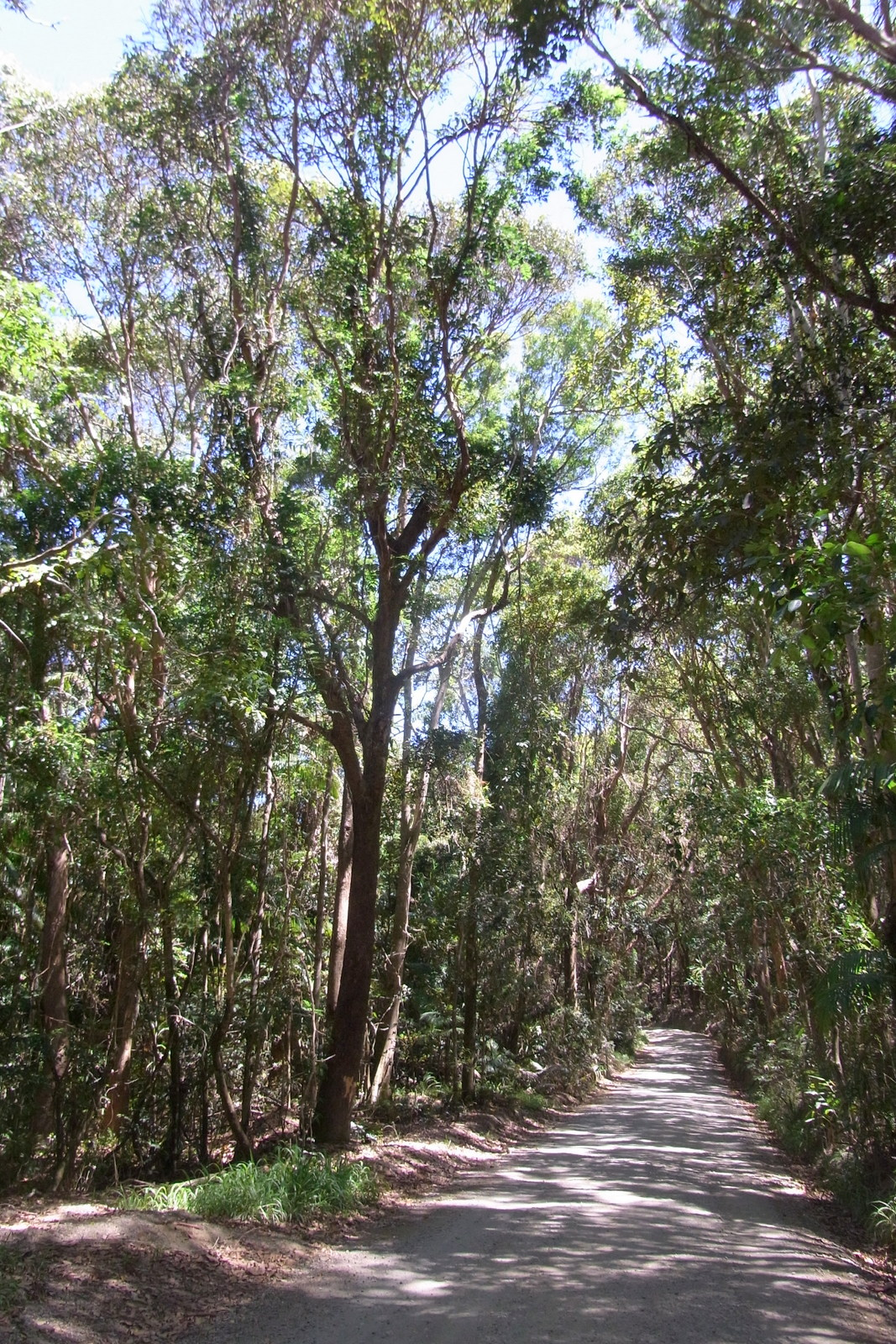
- road through Broken Head Nature Reserve

- Location within New South Wales
- Location: New South Wales
- Nearest city: Byron Bay
- Coordinates: 28°43′S 153°37′E
- Area: 0.98 km^{2} (0.38 sq mi)
- Governing body: NSW National Parks and Wildlife Service
- Website: http://www.environment.nsw.gov.au/NationalParks/parkFeesConditions.aspx?id=N0414

The Broken Head Nature Reserve is a protected nature reserve located in the Northern Rivers region of New South Wales, Australia, adjacent to the promontory of Broken Head which lies approximately 9 km south of Cape Byron, the easternmost point of Australia. The 98-hectare (240-acre) reserve contains an intact segment of littoral rainforest. Much of the Australian littoral rainforests have been destroyed for agriculture, mining or housing.

The Traditional Owners of Broken Head, and its surrounds, are the Arakwal people of the Bundjalung Nation.

Species of tree include tuckeroo, Broad-leaf Lilly Pilly, native elm, Pear Fruited Tamarind, Bennett's Ash, Bangalow Palm, Rusty Rose Walnut and hoop pine. The extremely rare scented acronychia may naturally occur here. Climbers such as Whip Vine and Lawyer Cane are very common. The weed lantana is a serious problem in disturbed areas. The area is noted for its Aboriginal culture, rainforest walks, whale watching, and fishing from pristine beaches.

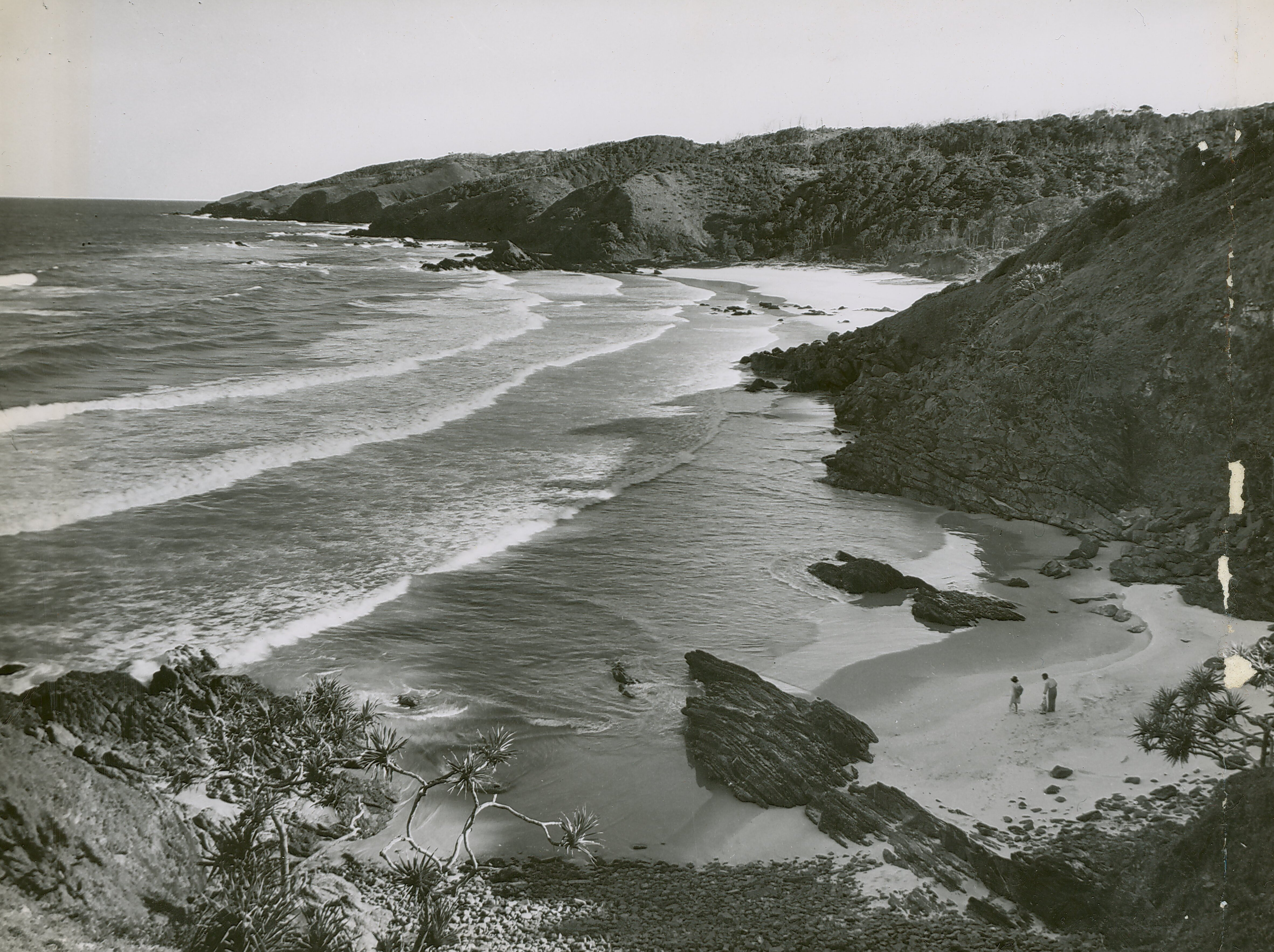
Kings Beach in background

== Kings Beach ==
Kings Beach lies within the Broken Head Nature Reserve and is accessed via a walking track through coastal rainforest, the beach is not visible from the road. The Beach was officially gazetted in 1982.

=== Kings Beach Significance as a Queer Space ===
Kings Beach has a long history as a space used by LGBTQIA+ communities. It is recognised as one of Australia's queer spaces and a rare example of a public gathering site for LGBTQIA+ people in a regional setting. The beach has never been officially classified as a clothing optional beach, however has been used as nude bathing beach since the 1930s.

Reports of nude bathing in the Broken Head area date back to 1934, when Byron Shire Council noted public concern over nudity and lack of control at the Beach. Kings Beach began attracting LGBTQIA+ people from the early 1970s, at a time when homosexuality remained criminalised in New South Wales. Publications such as Outrage (1984) and Campaign Australia (1987) referenced Kings Beach as a known site for gay nudists.

During the 1980s and 1990s, during the HIV/AIDS crisis, the Beach became a site for memorials, ash scatterings, and quiet reflection for those grieving lost partners and friends. Informal parties and gatherings were held at the Beach in conjunction with Tropical Fruits parties in Lismore, or marked milestones like the summer solstice and New Year’s Day.

In the early 2000s, The Pink Guide listed Kings Beach as a prominent destination for Queer travellers, likening it to LGBTQIA+ naturist spaces such as Hanlan’s Point in Toronto and Black’s Beach in San Diego.

==== Controversy over usage ====
In the 1980s, local police adopted a largely tolerant stance toward nude bathing at Kings Beach. A 1989 Byron News article noted that officers encouraged nudists to frequent Kings Beach over more populated Byron Bay beaches.

In 2011, a request for lifesaving equipment at the beach was allegedly denied by NPWS, with critics citing possible homophobia due to the Beach’s Queer association. The equipment was installed the following year after public outcry.

In 2013, NPWS proposed closing the Kings Beach carpark, a move many interpreted as an attempt to restrict queer use of the space. An online petition and local advocacy reversed the decision.

Following the closure of nearby Tyagarah Beach as a clothing-optional site in 2024., NPWS began increased enforcement against nudity at Kings Beach. Signs were erected and formal statements clarified that while Kings remained welcoming to the LGBTQIA+ community, it was no longer a designated clothing-optional area. These measures were met with community backlash, with critics calling for formal recognition of the beach’s queer heritage and inclusion in NPWS planning documents.

A 2025 NPWS consultation titled No More Beating Around the Bush invited feedback from the Queer community about clothing optional enforcements. Participants voiced concerns over the erasure of Queer history by the NPWS.

In 2025, a formal nomination was submitted to include Kings Beach on the NSW State Heritage Register, under the Heritage Act 1977. Advocates argued that the beach represents a rare and valuable cultural site for the LGBTQIA+ community in regional Australia, serving as a public space of safety, identity, and celebration over several decades. This nomination was rejected in May 2025.

== See also ==
- Protected areas of New South Wales
