= Kings Beach (New South Wales) =

Beach in New South Wales, Australia

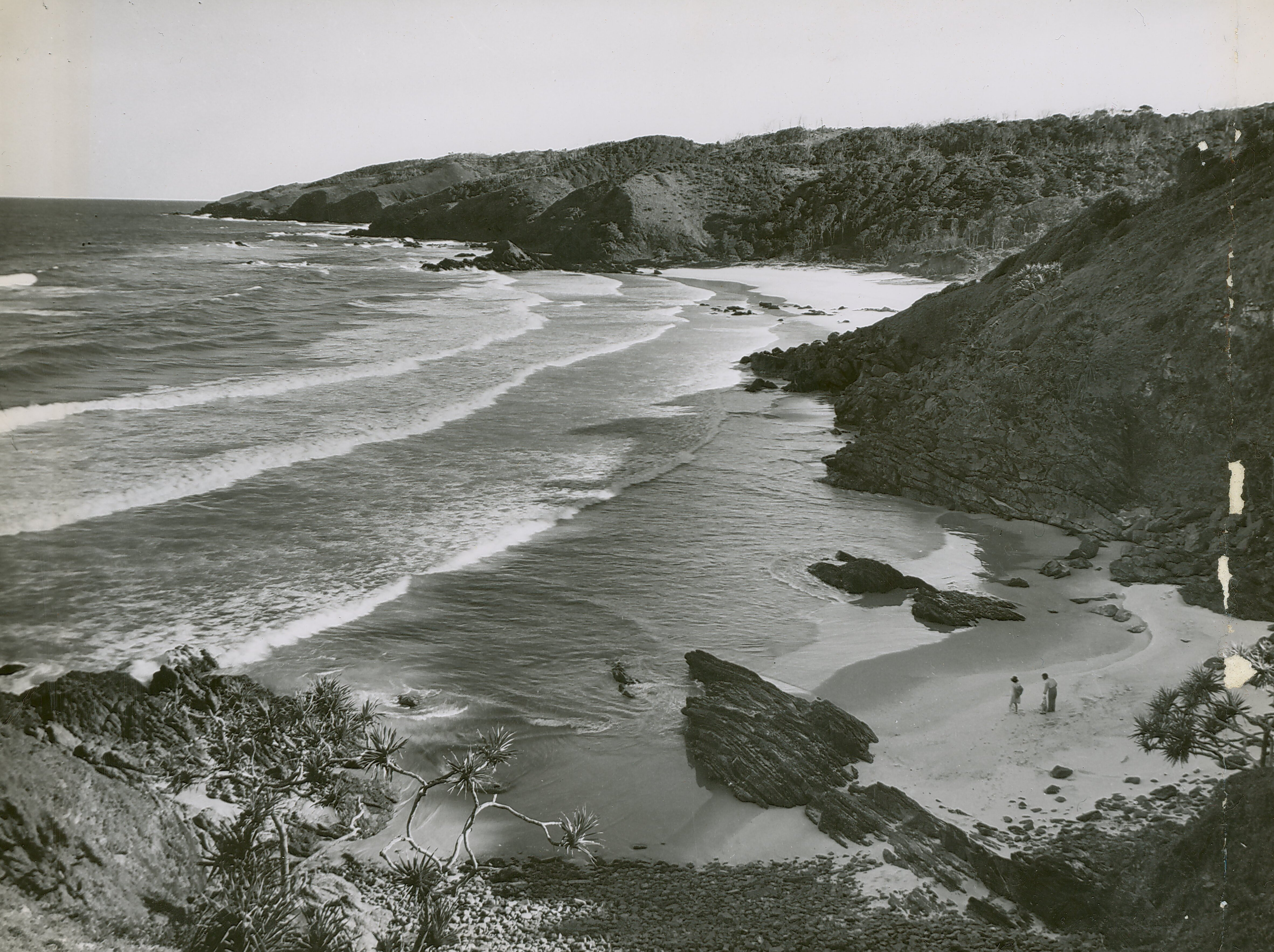
- View south over Kings beach
- Interactive map of Kings Beach
- Type: Public beach
- Location: Northern Rivers, New South Wales
- Nearest town: Byron Bay
- Coordinates: 28°42′36.2″S 153°37′00.2″E
- Established: 1896
- Operator: NSW National Parks & Wildlife Service
- Paths: Kings Beach Track
- Habitats: littoral rainforest
- Water: Cape Byron Marine Park
- Designation: IUCN category Ia
- Website: National Parks NSW

Kings Beach is an unofficial nude beach with longstanding significance to LGBTQ+ communities in New South Wales, Australia. Located within the Broken Head Nature Reserve, approximately 9 km south of Byron Bay, the 250-metre-long beach lies in a secluded bay surrounded by an intact remnant of endangered littoral rainforest.

== Geography ==
Kings Beach is situated within Bundjalung Country, the traditional lands of the Arakwal people of the Bundjalung Nation. Kings Beach is part of the Broken Head Nature Reserve, managed by the NSW National Parks & Wildlife Service (NPWS). The portion of the Pacific Ocean bordering the beach is the Broken Head Sanctuary Zone, part of the Cape Byron Marine Park, managed by the NSW Department of Primary Industries.

The area surrounding Kings Beach contains one of the last intact stands of littoral rainforest in New South Wales, supporting more than 240 recorded plant species and four listed threatened ecological communities, including subtropical rainforest and coastal Themeda grasslands. The region provides habitat for more than 25 threatened animal species and is notable for its populations of migratory and resident birds, fruit bats, and rainforest-dependent butterflies such as the endangered Richmond birdwing. Together, these ecosystems form part of a coastal wildlife corridor linking lowland and hinterland environments.

The inshore emergent rocks located along the beach and immediately offshore are a key reef system within the marine park. The marine environment surrounding Kings Beach is shaped by the East Australian Current, supporting a diverse range of fish species, including several important to commercial and recreational fisheries. The area is also frequented by various shark species—such as grey nurse, leopard, wobbegong, hammerhead, and bronze whaler—as well as migratory and resident bird species including pelicans, terns, herons, oystercatchers, and the endangered little tern.

== History ==
The area surrounding Kings Beach was originally gazetted as a recreation reserve in 1896 and later as the Broken Head Nature Reserve in 1974.

Kings Beach has been associated with nude bathing since at least the 1930s, when local authorities first recorded complaints about public nudity in the area and a "lack of control". By the early 1970s, the beach had become an informal gathering place for gay men and others in the LGBTQ+ community, drawn to its seclusion and relative safety during a period when homosexual acts were still criminalized in New South Wales. The beach was officially named in 1982.

By the early 1980s, Kings Beach had become widely known within LGBTQ+ circles. In 1984, the magazine OutRage referred to it as "the beach in northern NSW", highlighting its growing reputation among gay nudists. Throughout the 1980s and 1990s, the beach played a significant role as a refuge for queer communities during the HIV/AIDS crisis. It served as a site for memorials, ash scatterings, and quiet reflection, and it hosted informal gatherings linked to broader LGBTQ+ events in the region, including the Tropical Fruits celebrations in nearby Lismore. On 23 November 1988, roughly 40 people gathered at the beach to "remember friends and lovers to grieve and to be gathered, to be comforted" at a memorial organized through the Tropical Fruits.

In 1989, the NPWS constructed the Three Sisters Walking Track and the viewing platform overlooking Kings Beach, opening up sightlines to the previously secluded spot.

By the early 2000s, Kings Beach was listed in travel guides such as The Pink Guide as a notable gay naturist destination, often compared to other well-known queer nude beaches like Hanlan's Point Beach in Toronto and Black's Beach in San Diego. Kings Beach developed a reputation over several decades as a rare example of a public, regionally situated queer space in Australia.

== 2025 controversy ==
Although Kings Beach has never been officially designated as a nude beach, it has functioned as one for decades, particularly within LGBTQ+ communities. In the 1980s, local police were reportedly tolerant of nude sunbathing, at times directing nudists to Kings Beach rather than the busier Byron Bay beaches. In 2011, a request for lifesaving equipment was denied by the New South Wales National Parks and Wildlife Service (NPWS), a decision some critics linked to the beach's queer association. The equipment was installed the following year following public backlash. Another flashpoint occurred in 2013, when NPWS proposed closing the beach's main carpark—widely interpreted as an attempt to restrict queer access. The proposal was withdrawn after community advocacy and petitioning.

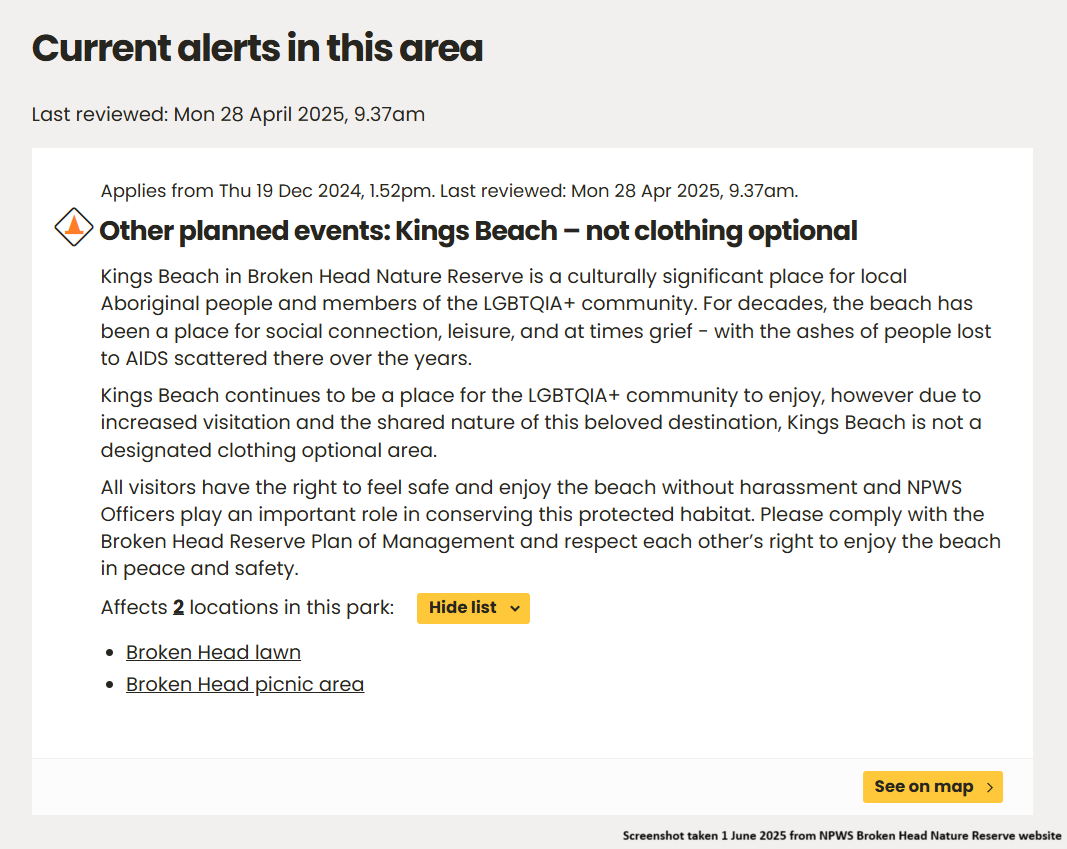
Alert on NPWS site: "not clothing optional"

In 2024, the closure of Tyagarah Beach as a clothing-optional site brought renewed attention to Kings Beach, which became the last known nude beach in the region. NPWS subsequently increased enforcement of anti-nudity regulations, installing signs and issuing statements stating that nudity was not legally permitted. While officials emphasized that the beach remained "welcoming" to LGBTQ+ visitors, many viewed the changes as part of a broader rollback of queer access to public space. Longtime beachgoers described Kings as a rare sanctuary and criticized the lack of community consultation. Particular frustration was directed at the 2019 Plan of Management for Broken Head Nature Reserve, which made no mention of the beach's decades-long queer history or cultural significance.

Photograph by Maurizio Viani of nude bathing at Kings Beach, April 2025

Photograph by Maurizio Viani of nude bathing at Kings Beach, April 2025

In response to the growing backlash, NPWS launched a consultation process in early 2025 titled "No More Beating Around the Bush", aimed at gathering feedback from LGBTQ+ community members. Participants expressed concern about the erasure of queer history and called for greater inclusion in planning processes. Later that year, a formal nomination was submitted to add Kings Beach to the New South Wales State Heritage Register under the Heritage Act 1977. Advocates argued that the beach represented a rare and enduring example of queer public space in regional Australia. In April 2025 photographer Maurizio Viani took a series of photographs, which were published in the Guardian Australia, of men using the beach as they had for decades. Despite this advocacy the nomination was rejected in May 2025.

== Access ==
Broken Head Nature Reserve is located approximately 9 km south of Byron Bay and is accessible by car or bicycle, with the ride taking roughly 30 minutes. As of May 2025, vehicle access requires payment of a park entry fee, currently $4 per vehicle per hour. There is limited parking for 25 cars available at the trailhead to Kings Beach Track.

Kings Beach can be reached via Seven Mile Beach Road. Visitors reach the beach via the 300-metre Kings Beach Track, which descends through steep terrain with stairs. The beach is undeveloped and does not offer waste disposal facilities; visitors are expected to follow a "pack in, pack out" ethic.

Fishing, spearfishing, anchoring on the reef, and the use of personal watercraft (jet skis) are prohibited within the marine park.

== See also ==
- Hanlan's Point Beach
- Gay naturism
- Riis Beach
- Ginger Rogers Beach
- Howell Park Beach
- Tyagarah Nature Reserve
