= Cheirostylis notialis =

Southern fleshy jewel orchid
- Near the coast of New South Wales

Conservation status
- Vulnerable (IUCN 3.1)

Scientific classification
- Kingdom: Plantae
- Clade: Tracheophytes
- Clade: Angiosperms
- Clade: Monocots
- Order: Asparagales
- Family: Orchidaceae
- Subfamily: Orchidoideae
- Tribe: Cranichideae
- Subtribe: Goodyerinae
- Genus: Cheirostylis
- Species: C. notialis

Binomial name
- Cheirostylis notialis D.L.Jones

Species of flowering plant

Cheirostylis notialis, commonly known as the southern fleshy jewel orchid, is a species of orchid that is endemic to eastern Australia where it grows in shady places in wet forest. It has between three and six egg-shaped leaves and up to four small flowers that open only slowly or not at all. It is differs from C. ovata in having smaller leaves and smaller, often cleistogamous flowers.

== Description ==
Cheirostylis notialis is a tuberous, perennial herb with between three and six egg-shaped leaves, 13–35 mm (0.5–1 in) long and 9–20 mm (0.4–0.8 in) wide on a petiole 3–10 mm (0.1–0.4 in) long. Up to four resupinate, hairy white flowers, 6–9 mm (0.2–0.4 in) long and 5–6 mm (0.20–0.24 in) wide are borne on a flowering stem 50–180 mm (2–7 in) tall. The dorsal sepal is 5–6 mm (0.20–0.24 in) long, about 4 mm (0.2 in) wide and fused with the lateral sepals to form a tube. The lateral sepals are a similar size to the dorsal sepal and the petals are the same length but about half as wide. The labellum is 8.5 mm (0.3 in) long, about 7 mm (0.3 in) wide with a shallow, pouch-like base. The tip of the labellum has two lobes with toothed edges. Flowering occurs from October to November.

== Taxonomy and naming ==
Cheirostylis notialis was first formally described in 1997 by D.L.Jones from a specimen collected near Broken in northern New South Wales. The specific epithet (notialis) is a Latin word meaning "southern", referring to the distribution of this species.

== Distribution and habitat ==
The southern fleshy jewel orchid grows in wet forest and rainforest between the Miriam Vale in south-eastern Queensland and near Scotts Head in New South Wales.
