= Obelisk Beach =

Nude beach in New South Wales, Australia

Obelisk Beach, Official Sign

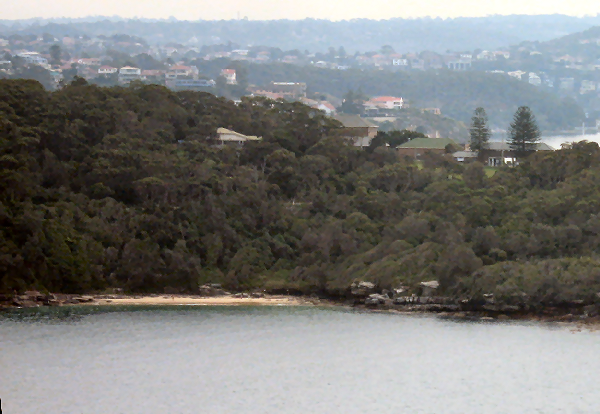
Aerial pic of Obelisk Beach

Obelisk Beach

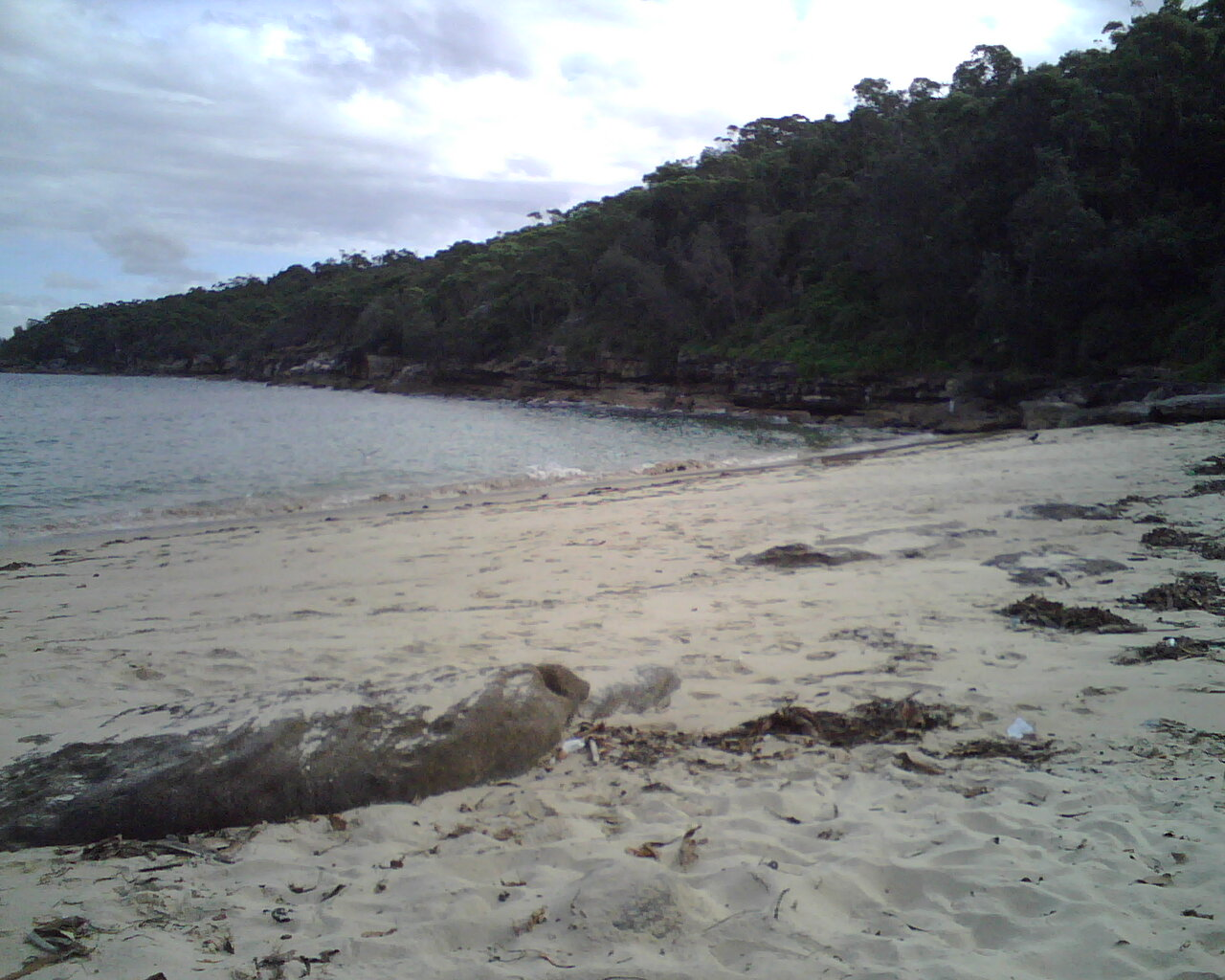
Obelisk Beach

Obelisk Beach (part of Obelisk Bay) is a nude beach in Mosman, New South Wales, Australia.

The beach is on the southern side of Middle Head in Sydney Harbour and is part of Sydney Harbour National Park.

Coordinates: 33°49′47″S 151°15′39″E

== History ==
Prior to European settlement in 1788, the area was inhabited by Indigenous Australians speaking the Dharug language. Aboriginal sites are found in the bushland all around Georges Head. The arrival of smallpox with European colonists meant that by 1795, the Aboriginal population on the northern side of Sydney Harbour had declined by as much as 90%.

In 1815, Governor Lachlan Macquarie dubbed Bungaree "Chief of the Broken Bay Tribe" and presented him with 15 acres (61,000 m^{2}) of land on Georges Head. He was also known by the titles "King of Port Jackson" and "King of the Blacks". Bungaree spent the rest of his life ceremonially welcoming visitors to Australia, educating people about Aboriginal culture (especially boomerang throwing), and soliciting tribute, especially from ships visiting Sydney. Bungaree and his family kept a fishing boat on the beach.

In the early 20th century, the beach was painted by artists such as Herbert Reginald Gallop, as well as being a popular site for picnics.

The beach is attended predominantly by homosexual men, and is considered a 'gay-friendly' beach by some and prior to 2004 it was the site of a gay beat.

== See also ==
- Kings Beach
- Gay naturism
- Hanlan's Point Beach
- Denny Blaine Beach
