= Tyagarah, New South Wales =

Tyagarah New South Wales
- Coordinates: 28°35′56″S 153°32′43″E
- Population: 152 (2016 census)
- Postcode(s): 2481
- LGA(s): Byron Shire
- State electorate(s): Ballina
- Federal division(s): Richmond

Tyagarah is a locality located in the Northern Rivers Region of New South Wales and it sits within the Byron Shire local government area. It is situated approximately 13 kilometres (8.1 mi) north of the regional centre Byron Bay.

It is on the lands of the Bundjalung people, who are its custodians, and it is of great importance the Arakwal people, to whom it holds spiritual and cultural significance.

Tyagarah Nature Reserve, within the locality, protects 7 kilometres (4.3 mi) of coastline which runs between Byron Bay and Brunswick Heads. At this reserve, you can swim, sunbathe, fish, birdwatch or eat at the picnic area.

The Byron Events Farm is located in Tyagarah, serving as a venue for major events and concerts, including hosting the Byron Bay Bluesfest.

== Origin of place name ==
The name comes from the Bundjalung language word Targourah which is the word for 'open grass country' or 'camping ground'.
