= 2004 AAPT Championships – Doubles =

Doubles
- 2004 AAPT Championships

Final
- Champions: (United States) Bob Bryan (United States) Mike Bryan
- Runners-up: (France) Arnaud Clément (France) Michaël Llodra
- Score: 7–5, 6–3

Events
Singles	Doubles
← 2003 ·	AAPT Championships	· 2005 →

Jeff Coetzee and Chris Haggard were the defending champions but did not compete that year.

Bob Bryan and Mike Bryan won in the final 7–5, 6–3 against Arnaud Clément and Michaël Llodra.

== Seeds ==
1. (United States) Bob Bryan / (United States) Mike Bryan (champions)
2. (Australia) Wayne Arthurs / (Australia) Paul Hanley (second round)
3. (Argentina) Gastón Etlis / (Argentina) Martín Rodríguez (second round)
4. (Zimbabwe) Wayne Black / (Zimbabwe) Kevin Ullyett (first round)

== Draw ==
=== Key ===
- Q = Qualifier
- WC = Wild card
- LL = Lucky loser
- Alt = Alternate
- SE = Special exempt
- PR = Protected ranking
- ITF = ITF entry
- JE = Junior exempt
- w/o = Walkover
- r = Retired
- d = Defaulted
- SR = Special ranking

First round
1	(United States) B Bryan (United States) M Bryan	6	6
WC	(Australia) C Guccione (Australia) T Reid	3	3
(Argentina) G Cañas (Argentina) M García	6^{4}	3
(Finland) J Nieminen (United States) G Oliver	7^{7}	6
4	(Zimbabwe) W Black (Zimbabwe) K Ullyett	6^{5}	4
(Sweden) S Aspelin (Italy) M Bertolini	7^{7}	6
(The Bahamas) M Merklein (United States) V Spadea	3	6	6
WC	(Australia) J Eagle (Australia) P Rafter	6	4	3
(South Africa) R Koenig (Czech Republic) P Pála	7^{7}	4	7
(Switzerland) Y Allegro (Argentina) S Prieto	6^{2}	6	5
(Argentina) L Arnold (Argentina) M Hood	4	6^{4}
3	(Argentina) G Etlis (Argentina) M Rodríguez	6	7^{7}
(United States) R Ginepri (Australia) T Perry	7	6^{9}	0
(France) A Clément (France) M Llodra	5	7^{11}	6
(Sweden) T Johansson (Ecuador) N Lapentti	1	5
2	(Australia) W Arthurs (Australia) P Hanley	6	7

Quarterfinals
1	(United States) B Bryan (United States) M Bryan	6	6
(Finland) J Nieminen (United States) G Oliver	4	1
(Sweden) S Aspelin (Italy) M Bertolini	4	6^{5}
(The Bahamas) M Merklein (United States) V Spadea	6	7^{7}
(South Africa) R Koenig (Czech Republic) P Pála	6	3	7^{10}
3	(Argentina) G Etlis (Argentina) M Rodríguez	3	6	6^{8}
(France) A Clément (France) M Llodra	w/o
2	(Australia) W Arthurs (Australia) P Hanley

Semifinals
1	(United States) B Bryan (United States) M Bryan	6	6
(The Bahamas) M Merklein (United States) V Spadea	1	3
(South Africa) R Koenig (Czech Republic) P Pála	2	3
(France) A Clément (France) M Llodra	6	6

Final
1	(United States) B Bryan (United States) M Bryan	7	6
(France) A Clément (France) M Llodra	5	3
