= Pat Rafter =

Australian tennis player (born 1972)

Patrick Rafter
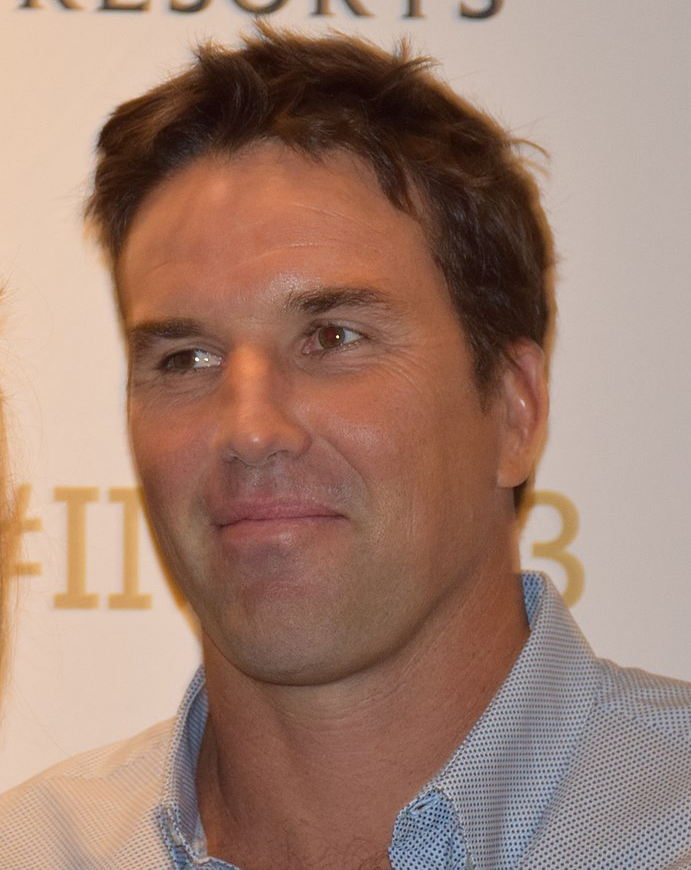
- Rafter at the 2015 Australian Open
- Full name: Patrick Michael Rafter
- Country (sports): Australia
- Residence: Broken Head, New South Wales, Australia
- Born: 28 December 1972 (age 53) Mount Isa, Queensland, Australia
- Height: 185 cm (6 ft 1 in)
- Turned pro: 1991
- Retired: 2003 (last match November 2001)
- Plays: Right-handed (one-handed backhand)
- Prize money: US$11,133,128
- Int. Tennis HoF: 2006 (member page)

Singles
- Career record: 358–191 (65.2%)
- Career titles: 11
- Highest ranking: No. 1 (26 July 1999)

Grand Slam singles results
- Australian Open: SF (2001)
- French Open: SF (1997)
- Wimbledon: F (2000, 2001)
- US Open: W (1997, 1998)

Other tournaments
- Tour Finals: RR (1997, 2001)
- Grand Slam Cup: F (1997)
- Olympic Games: 2R (2000)

Doubles
- Career record: 214–111 (65.8%)
- Career titles: 10
- Highest ranking: No. 6 (1 February 1999)

Grand Slam doubles results
- Australian Open: W (1999)
- French Open: SF (1998)
- Wimbledon: SF (1996, 1998)
- US Open: SF (1996)

Patrick Michael Rafter (born 28 December 1972) is an Australian former professional tennis player. He was ranked as the world No. 1 in men's singles by the Association of Tennis Professionals (ATP) in 1999, and world No. 6 in doubles. Rafter won eleven ATP Tour-level singles titles, including two majors at the 1997 and 1998 US Opens, as well as two Masters titles. He was also the runner-up at Wimbledon in 2000 and 2001. In doubles, Rafter won ten titles, including a major at the 1999 Australian Open partnering Jonas Björkman, and two Masters titles.

Rafter became the first man in the Open Era to win the Canada Masters, Cincinnati Masters and the US Open in the same year, a feat repeated only by Andy Roddick in 2003, and Rafael Nadal in 2013. Rafter is the third man in the Open Era to reach at least the semifinals of every major in both singles and doubles, after Rod Laver and Stefan Edberg, and remains the last man to date to accomplish this.

== Tennis career ==
Rafter turned professional in 1991. During the course of his career, he twice won the men's singles title at the US Open and was twice the runner-up at Wimbledon. He was known for his serve-and-volley style of play.

=== Early years (1991–1996) ===
Rafter won his first tour-level match in 1993, at Wimbledon. He reached the third round, before losing to Andre Agassi. He also reached the semifinals in Indianapolis. He defeated Pete Sampras in the quarterfinals in three tight sets, before losing to Boris Becker in the semifinals. Rafter finished 1993 with a ranking of 66.

Rafter won his first career singles title in 1994 in Manchester. Prior to 1997, this was the only ATP singles title he had won.

=== Breakthrough and stardom (1997–1999) ===
Rafter's breakthrough came in 1997. At that year's French Open, he reached the semifinals, falling in four sets to two time former champion Sergi Bruguera. Then, he surprised many by winning the US Open, defeating Andriy Medvedev, Magnus Norman, Lionel Roux, Andre Agassi, Magnus Larsson, and Michael Chang before beating Greg Rusedski in a four-set final; he was the first non-American to win the title since Stefan Edberg in 1992. This was his first Grand Slam title, and catapulted him ahead of Chang to finish the year ranked #2 in the world (behind only Pete Sampras). The unexpected nature of his US Open title led many, including Hall-of-famer and four-time US Open champion John McEnroe to criticise Rafter as a "one-slam wonder".

Rafter had a particularly strong year in 1998, winning the Canadian Open and the Cincinnati Masters ─ Andre Agassi (1995), Andy Roddick (2003), and Rafael Nadal (2013) are the only other players to have won both of these tournaments in the same year. Rafter defeated ninth-ranked Richard Krajicek in the Toronto final and second-ranked Pete Sampras in the Cincinnati final. When asked about the difference between himself and Rafter following their titles, Sampras responded, "10 grand slams". He added that a tennis player must come back and win a Grand Slam again in order to be considered great.

Entering the U.S. Open as the defending champion, Rafter reached the final by defeating Hicham Arazi, Hernán Gumy, David Nainkin, Goran Ivanišević and Jonas Björkman before besting Sampras in a five-set semifinal. Rafter then defended his US Open title by defeating fellow Australian Mark Philippoussis in four sets, committing only five unforced errors throughout the match. Altogether, Rafter won six tournaments in 1998, finishing the year No. 4 in the world.

Rafter won the Australian Open men's doubles title in 1999 (partnering Jonas Björkman), making him one of few players in the modern era to win both a singles and doubles Grand Slam title during their career (fellow countryman Lleyton Hewitt would later achieve this feat in 2001). He and Björkman also won a doubles title at the ATP Masters Series event in Canada in 1999. At the 1999 French Open, Rafter drew future world No. 1 and 20-time Grand Slam champion Roger Federer in the first round, making him the first-ever opponent of Federer in the main draw of a Grand Slam tournament. Rafter defeated him in four sets. Rafter then reached the Wimbledon semifinals for the first time in 1999, losing in straight sets to Agassi. This was the first of three consecutive years that the two met in the Wimbledon semifinals. July 1999 saw Rafter holding the world No. 1 men's singles ranking for one week, making him the shortest-reigning world No. 1 in ATP Tour history. As the two-time defending US Open champion, Rafter lost in the first round of the tournament, retiring in the fifth set against Cédric Pioline after succumbing to shoulder tendinitis. Rafter's shoulder injury wound up being serious enough to necessitate surgery.

Due to injury, Rafter was unable to play in the 1999 Davis Cup final won by Australia; however, he won important matches in the earlier rounds to help the team qualify.

=== Late career (2000–2003) ===
Rafter's ranking had fallen to No. 21 by the time he reached the Wimbledon final in July 2000. In the semifinals, he defeated Agassi 7–5, 4–6, 7–5, 4–6, 6–3. The match was hailed as a classic, particularly because of their contrasting playing styles, with Agassi playing primarily from the baseline and Rafter attacking the net. Rafter faced Sampras in the final, who was gunning for a record-breaking seventh Wimbledon title overall (and seven in the past eight years). While Rafter made a strong start to the match and took the first set, after the match he would claim that he had "choked" part way through the second set tie-break, and was then not able to get back into his game. Sampras won in four sets.

Rafter played on the Australian Davis Cup Team that lost in the final in 2000 (to Spain) and 2001 (to France). Rafter played on the Australian teams that won the World Team Cup in 1999 and 2001.

In 2001, Rafter reached the semifinals of the Australian Open. Despite holding a two sets to one lead and having the support of the home crowd, Rafter lost the match to Agassi in five sets. Later in the year, Rafter again reached the Wimbledon final. For the third straight year, he faced Agassi in the semifinals and won in yet another five-setter, 2–6, 6–3, 3–6, 6–2, 8–6. Much like the previous year's semifinal, this match also received praise for the quality of play that the two men displayed. The final was originally scheduled to play on the second Sunday but was rescheduled to the third Monday because the other semifinal between Goran Ivanišević and Tim Henman was played on three separate days. In the final he played Ivanišević, who had reached the Wimbledon final three times before but had slid down the rankings to World No. 125 following injury problems. In a five-set struggle that lasted just over three hours, Ivanišević prevailed. He played his last match at the Davis Cup final on rubber, winning the singles but losing the doubles.

Rafter did not play any tour matches in 2002. He spent the year recovering from injuries. In January 2003, he announced his retirement from professional tennis, stating that he had lost all motivation to compete at the top level.

=== Comebacks and post-retirement activities ===
The 5,500-seat centre court of the Queensland Tennis Centre in Brisbane, Australia, was named Pat Rafter Arena in Rafter's honour. In 2002, he won the Australian of the Year award. This created some controversy, as he had spent much of his career residing in Bermuda for tax purposes.

Rafter did return at the beginning of the 2004 season to play doubles at two tournaments only; the 2004 Australian Open and the 2004 AAPT Championships (in Adelaide). However, he lost in round one of both events, playing alongside Joshua Eagle.

In 2005, Rafter won the International Club's prestigious Jean Borotra Sportsmanship Award.

He was elected to the International Tennis Hall of Fame and inducted into the Sport Australia Hall of Fame in 2006. On Australia Day 2008, Rafter was inducted into the Australian Tennis Hall of Fame.

In 2009, as part of the Q150 celebrations, Rafter was announced as one of the Q150 Icons of Queensland for his role as a "sports legend".

In October 2010, Rafter was announced as Australia's Davis Cup captain. Rafter stood down as Australia's Davis Cup captain on 29 January 2015. He was succeeded by Wally Masur.

On 12 January 2014, Rafter—then aged 41—announced that he would be partnering current Australian number one Lleyton Hewitt in the doubles draw of the 2014 Australian Open. The comeback, however, was short-lived, as the pair went down in straight sets to eventual runner-ups Eric Butorac and Raven Klaasen in the first round.

==== ATP Champions Tour ====
At the 2009 AEGON Masters Tennis, Rafter lost his opening round robin match against the 1987 Wimbledon Champion and fellow Aussie Pat Cash 2–6, 6–2, 10–6. In a much anticipated match and replay of the 2001 Wimbledon final, Rafter faced Goran Ivanišević. Rafter won the match when Ivanisevic retired while serving for the opening set, 3–5. Despite his performance, the retirement was enough to push Rafter into the final against Stefan Edberg. In what is described as a spell-binding serve-and-volley showdown, Rafter won the match 6–7, 6–4, 11–9. This represented the first time that Rafter was able to defeat Edberg.

== Career statistics ==
=== Grand Slam performance timeline ===
Key
W	F	SF	QF	#R	RR	Q#	DNQ	A	NH

(W) winner; (F) finalist; (SF) semifinalist; (QF) quarterfinalist; (#R) rounds 4, 3, 2, 1; (RR) round-robin stage; (Q#) qualification round; (DNQ) did not qualify; (A) absent; (NH) not held; (SR) strike rate (events won / competed); (W–L) win–loss record.

Tournament	1990	1991	1992	1993	1994	1995	1996	1997	1998	1999	2000	2001	SR	W–L
Australian Open	Q2	Q1	1R	1R	3R	4R	2R	1R	3R	3R	A	SF	0 / 9	15–9
French Open	A	A	A	Q3	4R	1R	1R	SF	2R	3R	2R	1R	0 / 8	12–8
Wimbledon	A	A	Q2	3R	2R	1R	4R	4R	4R	SF	F	F	0 / 9	29–9
US Open	A	A	Q1	1R	3R	2R	1R	W	W	1R	1R	4R	2 / 9	20–7
Win–loss	0–0	0–0	0–1	2–3	8–4	4–4	4–4	15–3	13–3	9–4	7–3	14–4	2 / 35	76–33

==== Finals: 4 (2 titles, 2 runners-up) ====
Result	Year	Championship	Surface	Opponent	Score
Win	1997	US Open	Hard	(United Kingdom) Greg Rusedski	6–3, 6–2, 4–6, 7–5
Win	1998	US Open (2)	Hard	(Australia) Mark Philippoussis	6–3, 3–6, 6–2, 6–0
Loss	2000	Wimbledon	Grass	(United States) Pete Sampras	7–6^{(12–10)}, 6–7^{(5–7)}, 4–6, 2–6
Loss	2001	Wimbledon	Grass	(Croatia) Goran Ivanišević	3–6, 6–3, 3–6, 6–2, 7–9

== See also ==
- List of male underwear models

Sporting positions
Preceded by Tim Henman	ATP Most Improved Player; 1997	Succeeded by Andre Agassi
