= Kings Beach =

Kings Beach may refer to:

== Australia ==
- Kings Beach, Queensland, Australia, a suburb of Caloundra
- Kings Beach (New South Wales), Australia, a beach
- Kings Beach (South Australia), Australia, a beach

== United States ==
- Kings Beach, California, United States, a census-designated place
