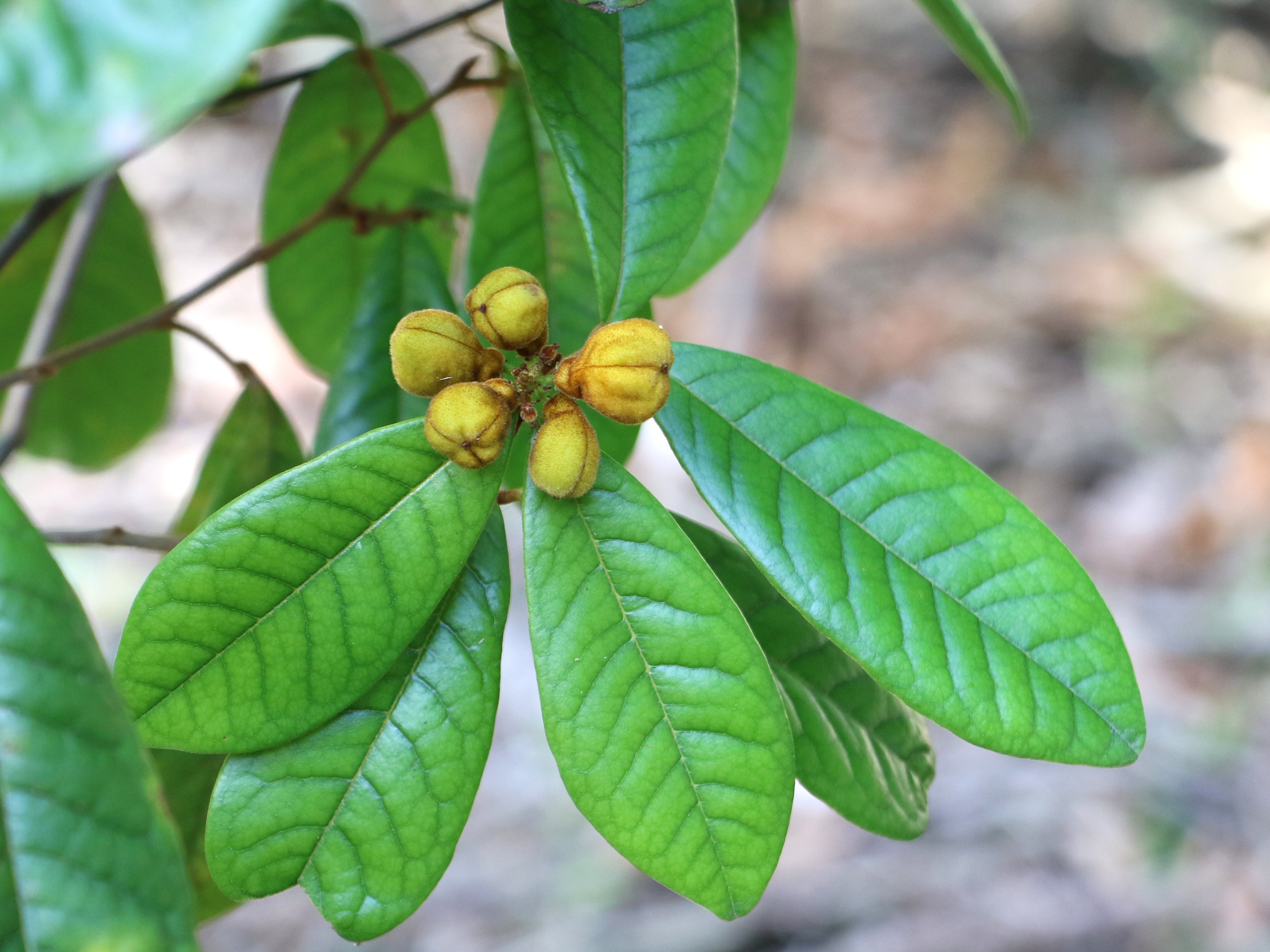

Scientific classification
- Kingdom: Plantae
- Clade: Embryophytes
- Clade: Tracheophytes
- Clade: Spermatophytes
- Clade: Angiosperms
- Clade: Eudicots
- Clade: Rosids
- Order: Sapindales
- Family: Sapindaceae
- Genus: Mischocarpus
- Species: M. ailae

Binomial name
- Mischocarpus ailae Guymer

= Mischocarpus ailae =

Woolly pear-fruit

Species of tree

Mischocarpus ailae, known as the woolly pear-fruit, is a rainforest tree of north eastern New South Wales and south east Queensland, Australia. These southern populations comprising M. ailae were previously included in Mischocarpus lachnocarpus.

The species was first described in 2009 by Gordon Guymer.
