= 2003 AAPT Championships – Singles =

Singles
- 2003 AAPT Championships

Final
- Champion: (Russia) Nikolay Davydenko
- Runner-up: (Belgium) Kristof Vliegen
- Score: 6–2, 7–6^{(7–3)}

Details
- Seeds: 8

Events
Singles	Doubles
← 2002 ·	AAPT Championships	· 2004 →

Tim Henman was the defending champion but did not compete that year.

Nikolay Davydenko won in the final 6–2, 7–6^{(7–3)} against Kristof Vliegen.

== Seeds ==
1. (South Africa) Wayne Ferreira (first round)
2. (Belarus) Max Mirnyi (second round)
3. (Sweden) Thomas Enqvist (first round)
4. (Croatia) Ivan Ljubičić (second round)
5. (Argentina) Mariano Zabaleta (quarterfinals)
6. (Spain) Alberto Martín (quarterfinals)
7. (Belgium) Olivier Rochus (first round)
8. (United States) Vince Spadea (second round)

== Draw ==
=== Key ===
- Q = Qualifier
- WC = Wild card
- LL = Lucky loser
- Alt = Alternate
- SE = Special exempt
- PR = Protected ranking
- ITF = ITF entry
- JE = Junior exempt
- w/o = Walkover
- r = Retired
- d = Defaulted
- SR = Special ranking

=== Finals ===
Semifinals
(Netherlands) Richard Krajicek	6^{1}	6	3
Q	(Belgium) Kristof Vliegen	7^{7}	4	6
(Russia) Nikolay Davydenko	6	6
(Romania) Adrian Voinea	2	1

Final
Q	(Belgium) Kristof Vliegen	2	6^{3}
(Russia) Nikolay Davydenko	6	7^{7}

=== Top half ===
First round
1	(South Africa) W Ferreira	6^{4}	2
(Argentina) F Squillari	7^{7}	6
WC	(Australia) S Draper	6^{4}	4
(Netherlands) R Krajicek	7^{7}	6
WC	(Australia) A Kennedy	6	2	0
(United States) B Vahaly	4	6	6
WC	(Australia) T Reid	6	3	3
8	(United States) V Spadea	3	6	6
3	(Sweden) T Enqvist	6	4	3
Q	(Belgium) K Vliegen	3	6	6
Q	(United Kingdom) A Parmar	6^{5}	6	6
(Israel) H Levy	7^{7}	4	1
(France) A Di Pasquale	6	3	4
Q	(France) R Gasquet	3	6	6
(Austria) J Melzer	1	3
6	(Spain) A Martín	6	6

Second round
(Argentina) F Squillari	4	3
(Netherlands) R Krajicek	6	6
(United States) B Vahaly	7^{7}	6
8	(United States) V Spadea	6^{1}	2
Q	(Belgium) K Vliegen	6	6
Q	(United Kingdom) A Parmar	2	2
Q	(France) R Gasquet	5	1
6	(Spain) A Martín	7	6

Quarterfinals
(Netherlands) R Krajicek	6	6
(United States) B Vahaly	1	3
Q	(Belgium) K Vliegen	6	6
6	(Spain) A Martín	3	4

Semifinals
(Netherlands) R Krajicek	6^{1}	6	3
Q	(Belgium) K Vliegen	7^{7}	4	6

=== Bottom half ===
First round
5	(Argentina) M Zabaleta	6	6
(Germany) A Waske	1	4
Q	(France) F Serra	3	4
(Netherlands) M Verkerk	6	6
(Russia) N Davydenko	6	7^{7}
(Georgia (country)) I Labadze	2	6^{5}
(United States) J Morrison	4	3
4	(Croatia) I Ljubičić	6	6
7	(Belgium) O Rochus	1	6	6^{4}
(Romania) A Voinea	6	4	7^{7}
(United States) A Kim	2	6	6
(Hungary) A Sávolt	6	3	3
(France) A Dupuis	6	6
(Slovakia) K Beck	4	3
(Italy) S Galvani	6^{5}	2
2	(Belarus) M Mirnyi	7^{7}	6

Second round
5	(Argentina) M Zabaleta	6	6
(Netherlands) M Verkerk	4	4
(Russia) N Davydenko	4	6	7^{11}
4	(Croatia) I Ljubičić	6	4	6^{9}
(Romania) A Voinea	6	6
(United States) A Kim	4	1
(France) A Dupuis	7^{7}	6
2	(Belarus) M Mirnyi	6^{3}	3

Quarterfinals
5	(Argentina) M Zabaleta	6^{3}	1
(Russia) N Davydenko	7^{7}	6
(Romania) A Voinea	7^{8}	6
(France) A Dupuis	6^{6}	4

Semifinals
(Russia) N Davydenko	6	6
(Romania) A Voinea	2	1
