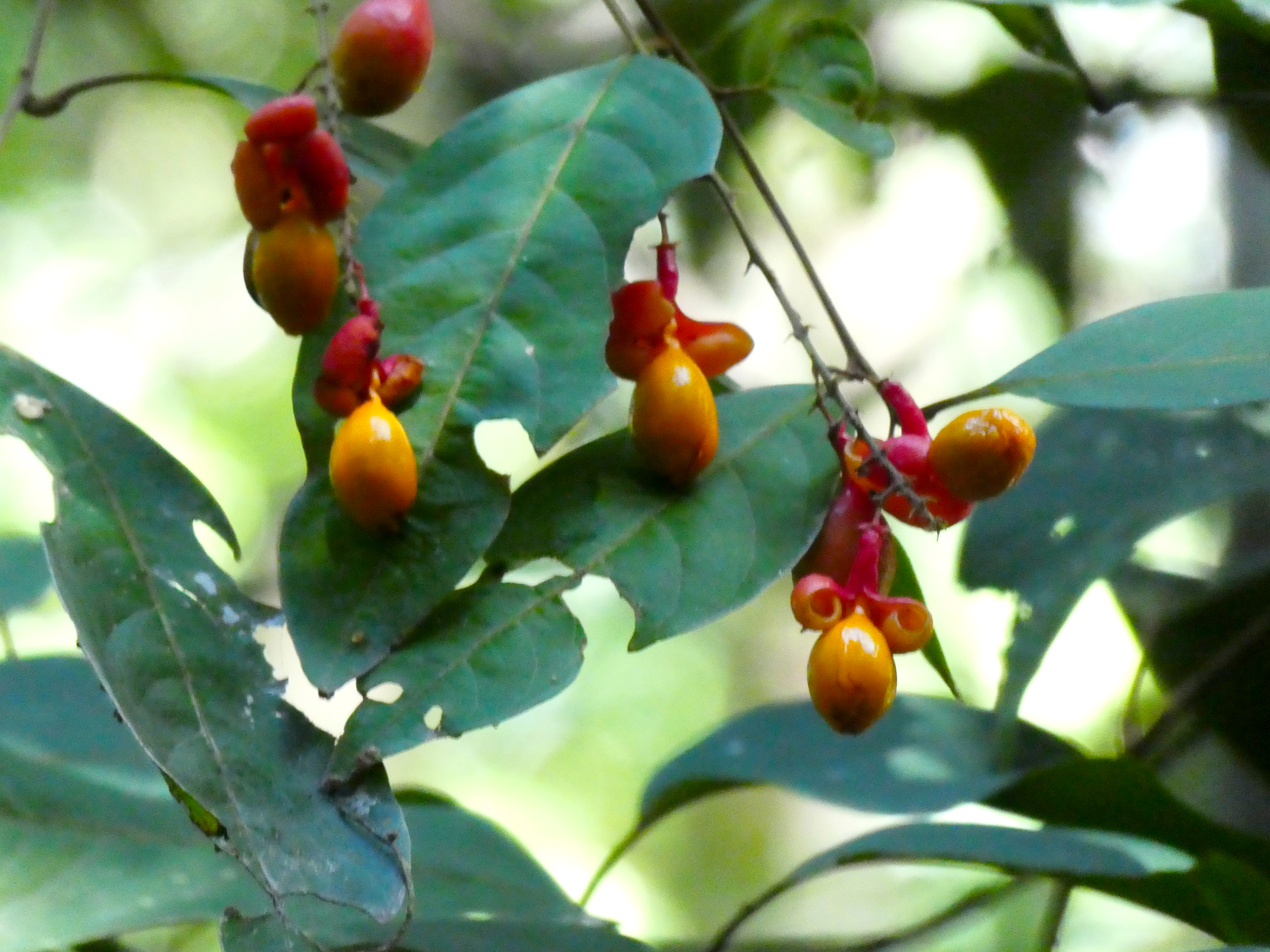
- Fruit

Conservation status
- Least Concern (NCA)

Scientific classification
- Kingdom: Plantae
- Clade: Tracheophytes
- Clade: Angiosperms
- Clade: Eudicots
- Clade: Rosids
- Order: Sapindales
- Family: Sapindaceae
- Genus: Mischocarpus
- Species: M. exangulatus

Binomial name
- Mischocarpus exangulatus (F.Muell.) Radlk.

Synonyms
- Ratonia exangulata F.Muell.; Arytera subnitida C.T.White; Cupania exangulata F.Muell.

= Mischocarpus exangulatus =

Red bell mischocarp

Species of flowering plant

Mischocarpus exangulatus, commonly known as red bell mischocarp, is a plant in the family Sapindaceae endemic to Queensland, Australia. It is a small tree up to 15 m (49 ft) tall with pinnate leaves and brightly coloured red or yellow fruit. It was first described in 1864 as Ratonia exangulata by Australian botanist Ferdinand von Mueller, and later transferred to Mischocarpus by German botanist Ludwig Radlkofer.

== Distribution and habitat ==
Mischocarpus exangulatus is found on the east coast of Queensland from the McIlwraith Range on Cape York Peninsula to the Paluma Range a little north of Townsville. It inhabits a range of forest types on various soils, at altitudes from sea level to 1,100 m (3,600 ft).

== Conservation ==
This species is listed as least concern under the Queensland Government's Nature Conservation Act. As of 9 December 2024, it has not been assessed by the International Union for Conservation of Nature (IUCN).
