= 2002 AAPT Championships – Doubles =

Doubles
- 2002 AAPT Championships

Final
- Champions: (Zimbabwe) Wayne Black (Zimbabwe) Kevin Ullyett
- Runners-up: (United States) Bob Bryan (United States) Mike Bryan
- Score: 7–5, 6–2

Events
Singles	Doubles
← 2001 ·	AAPT Championships	· 2003 →

David Macpherson and Grant Stafford were the defending champions but only Macpherson competed that year with Andrew Florent.

Florent and Macpherson lost in the first round to Bob Bryan and Mike Bryan.

Wayne Black and Kevin Ullyett won in the final 7–5, 6–2 against the Bryans.

== Seeds ==
1. (Zimbabwe) Wayne Black / (Zimbabwe) Kevin Ullyett (champions)
2. (Netherlands) Sjeng Schalken / (Australia) Todd Woodbridge (quarterfinals)
3. (Australia) Joshua Eagle / (Australia) Sandon Stolle (semifinals)
4. (Germany) David Prinosil / (United States) Jeff Tarango (quarterfinals)

== Draw ==
=== Key ===
- Q = Qualifier
- WC = Wild card
- LL = Lucky loser
- Alt = Alternate
- SE = Special exempt
- PR = Protected ranking
- ITF = ITF entry
- JE = Junior exempt
- w/o = Walkover
- r = Retired
- d = Defaulted
- SR = Special ranking

First round
1	(Zimbabwe) W Black (Zimbabwe) K Ullyett	6	6
WC	(Australia) S Huss (Australia) L Pearson	1	4
(Australia) W Arthurs (Australia) M Hill	2	6^{4}
(France) M Llodra (Japan) T Shimada	6	7^{7}
4	(Germany) D Prinosil (United States) J Tarango	6	6
(Germany) K Braasch (Brazil) A Sá	2	1
WC	(United Kingdom) T Henman (Australia) M Philippoussis	4	6	6
(Australia) A Kratzmann (Belgium) T Vanhoudt	6	3	2
(France) J Boutter (South Africa) W Ferreira	6^{6}	6^{5}
(Sweden) T Enqvist (Chile) M Ríos	7^{8}	7^{7}
WC	(Australia) P Hanley (Australia) N Healey	6	6^{2}	4
3	(Australia) J Eagle (Australia) S Stolle	4	7^{7}	6
(Australia) A Florent (Australia) D Macpherson	3	6	0
(United States) B Bryan (United States) M Bryan	6	4	6
(Morocco) H Arazi (Spain) A Martín	6	4	3
2	(Netherlands) S Schalken (Australia) T Woodbridge	3	6	6

Quarterfinals
1	(Zimbabwe) W Black (Zimbabwe) K Ullyett	7^{8}	7
(France) M Llodra (Japan) T Shimada	6^{6}	5
4	(Germany) D Prinosil (United States) J Tarango	3	6	4
WC	(United Kingdom) T Henman (Australia) M Philippoussis	6	2	6
(Sweden) T Enqvist (Chile) M Ríos	2	3
3	(Australia) J Eagle (Australia) S Stolle	6	6
(United States) B Bryan (United States) M Bryan	7	2	6
2	(Netherlands) S Schalken (Australia) T Woodbridge	5	6	3

Semifinals
1	(Zimbabwe) W Black (Zimbabwe) K Ullyett	2	6	7^{7}
WC	(United Kingdom) T Henman (Australia) M Philippoussis	6	2	6^{4}
3	(Australia) J Eagle (Australia) S Stolle	4	7^{7}	2
(United States) B Bryan (United States) M Bryan	6	6^{5}	6

Final
1	(Zimbabwe) W Black (Zimbabwe) K Ullyett	7	6
(United States) B Bryan (United States) M Bryan	5	2
