= 2003 AAPT Championships =

- Date: 30 December 2002 – 5 January 2003
- Edition: 26th
- Category: International Series
- Draw: 32S/16D
- Prize money: $332,000
- Surface: Hard / outdoor
- Location: Adelaide, Australia

Champions

Singles
- (Russia) Nikolay Davydenko

Doubles
- (South Africa) Jeff Coetzee / (South Africa) Chris Haggard
- AAPT Championships

The 2003 AAPT Championships was a men's tennis tournament played on outdoor hard courts in Adelaide in Australia and was part of the International Series of the 2003 ATP Tour. The tournament ran from 30 December 2002 through 5 January 2003. Unseeded Nikolay Davydenko won the singles title.

== Finals ==
=== Singles ===
(Russia) Nikolay Davydenko defeated (Belgium) Kristof Vliegen 6–2, 7–6^{(7–3)}

- It was Davydenko's 1st singles title of his career.

=== Doubles ===
(South Africa) Jeff Coetzee / (South Africa) Chris Haggard defeated (Belarus) Max Mirnyi / (United States) Jeff Morrison 2–6, 6–4, 7–6^{(9–7)}

- It was Coetzee's only title of the year and the 3rd of his career. It was Haggard's only title of the year and the 4th of his career.
