= Cheirostylis tippica =

Conservation status
- Critically Endangered (IUCN 3.1)

Scientific classification
- Kingdom: Plantae
- Clade: Tracheophytes
- Clade: Angiosperms
- Clade: Monocots
- Order: Asparagales
- Family: Orchidaceae
- Subfamily: Orchidoideae
- Tribe: Cranichideae
- Genus: Cheirostylis
- Species: C. tippica

Binomial name
- Cheirostylis tippica A.N.Rao

Species of orchid

Cheirostylis tippica is a critically endangered species of orchid endemic to India.

== Description ==
This orchid grows like a herb with a stem up to 3 cm high. It has ten leaves that are ovate-lanceolate and arranged alternatively connected by a slender petiole to the stem. The inflorescence is 7 cm long with 3 to 4 flowers at the tip. The flowers are dark green and purple with hair. The petals are 4.5 mm long and the lip is white in color with two green blotches and 7 mm x 2 mm in size.

It resembles Cheirostylis liukiuensis but can be differentiated by hairy floral bract that is shorter than ovary, hypochile of the lip having 4 separate villi and the gradual reduction of leaf size towards the flower.

== Distribution ==
This orchid was collected by A. Nageswara Rao from Tippi in West Kameng district of Arunachal Pradesh and no further locations were recorded as of 2020 hence assuming its distribution to a 4 km^{2} area.

== Ecology ==
This orchid was found growing in sandy soil with decaying vegetation at 150 to 250 metres elevation. It was found flowering during January and February.

== Etymology ==
This species is named after the place Tippi from where it was collected.

== Conservation and threats ==
This orchid was never seen after the initial collection in 1991. The region where it was found is threatened by logging, air pollution, climate change and human habitat expansion.
