= Tyagarah Nature Reserve =

Protected area in New South Wales, Australia

Coordinates: 28°36′17″S 153°34′32″E

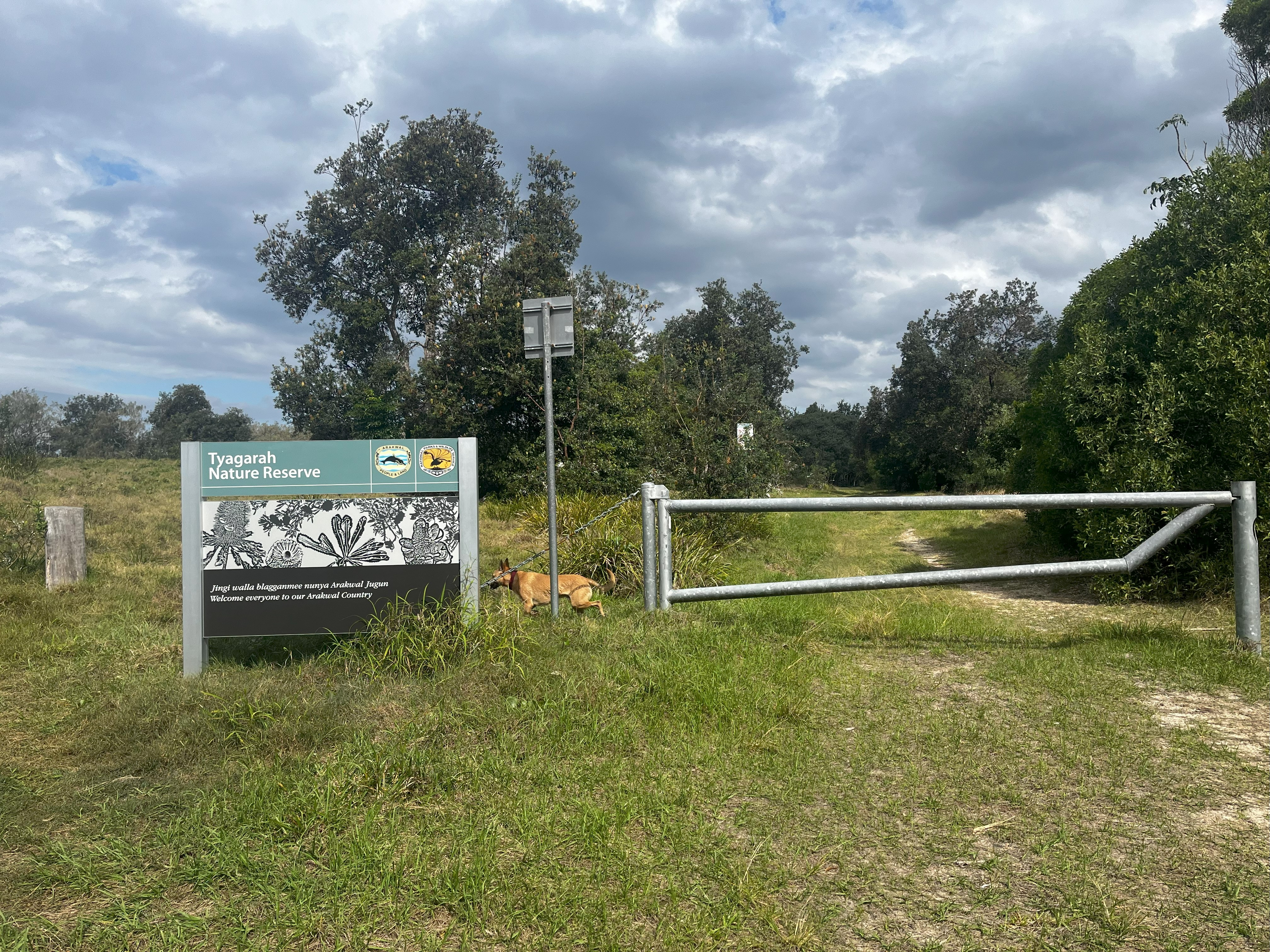
Tyagarah Nature Reserve entrance at Brunswick Heads, September 2024

The Tyagarah Nature Reserve is a protected nature reserve located in the Northern Rivers region of New South Wales, Australia. The reserve protects 7 kilometres (4.3 mi) of coastline between Byron Bay and Brunswick Heads and has a total size of 875 hectares (2,160 acres). It is a popular place for whale watchers, particularly in spring when humpback whale mothers pass through when travelling from the Great Barrier Reef to Antarctica.

It protects six endangered ecological communities including coastal saltmarsh and swamp sclerophyll forest. There are also 33 threatened plant species that occur or are known to occur there including stinking cryptocarya, red lilly pilly and green-leaved rose walnut.

The reserve is on the lands of the Bundjalung people, who are its custodians, and it is of great importance the Arakwal people, to whom it holds spiritual and cultural significance. The name Tyagarah comes from the Yugambeh–Bundjalung language word Targourah and is the word for 'open grass country' or 'camping ground'.

== Tyagarah Beach ==
Tyagarah Beach, within the reserve, was formally designated a clothing optional beach by the Byron Shire in 1998, however, this had long been in common practice and was first documented in 1902 when a man was arrested and gaoled for swimming there naked. During its time as a clothing optional beach it became a sanctuary and social hub for naturalists and members of the LGBTQIA+ community as it represented freedom and belonging.

Despite this, and its popularity, this status was removed 30 August 2024 following complaints about inappropriate behaviour and, in the lead up a series of protests were held, including one in 2018 which rallied under the banner "Nude Not Lewd". Many saw this as a part of a "conservative creep" and "moral panic" in the region and a deliberate shift from its alternative/countercultural roots. Another beach was not designated clothing optional in its place.

== See also ==
- Protected areas of New South Wales
