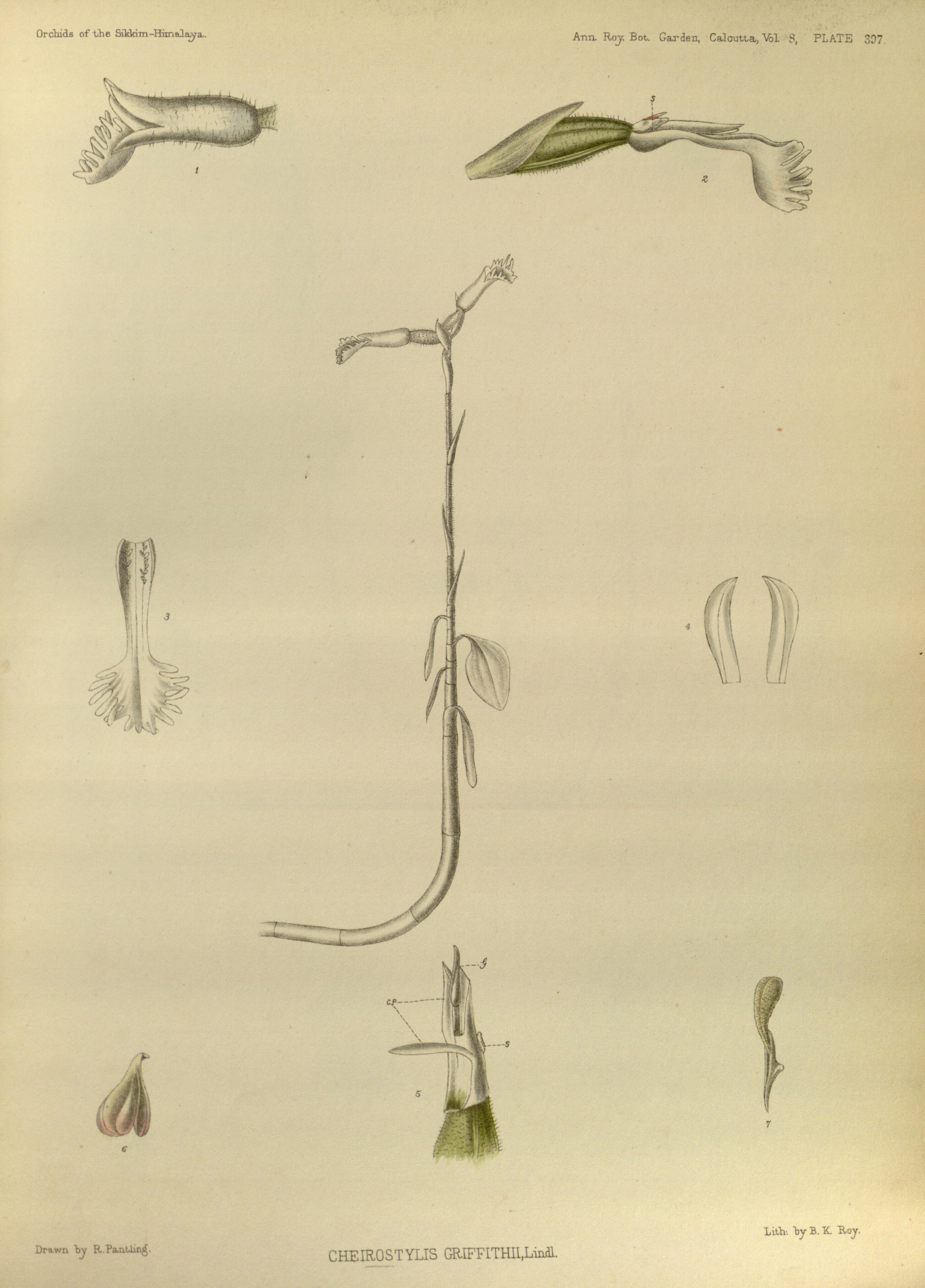

Scientific classification
- Kingdom: Plantae
- Clade: Tracheophytes
- Clade: Angiosperms
- Clade: Monocots
- Order: Asparagales
- Family: Orchidaceae
- Subfamily: Orchidoideae
- Tribe: Cranichideae
- Subtribe: Goodyerinae
- Genus: Cheirostylis; Blume

Type species
- Cheirostylis montana Blume

Synonyms
- Arisanorchis Hayata; Gymnochilus Blume; Hayata Aver.; Mariarisqueta Guinea

= Cheirostylis =

Fleshy jewel orchids

Genus of flowering plants

Cheirostylis, commonly known as fleshy jewel orchids or velvet orchids, is a genus of about sixty species of flowering plants in the orchid family Orchidaceae. Plants in this genus are terrestrial herbs with a caterpillar-like rhizome and a loose rosette of leaves. Small, white, hairy flowers develop as the leaves wither. They are found in tropical Africa, southern Asia, Southeast Asia, Malesia, New Guinea and Australia.

== Description ==
Orchids in the genus Cheirostylis are terrestrial, perennial, deciduous, sympodial herbs with a creeping, caterpillar-like, above-ground rhizome anchored to the ground by fine white root hairs. The leaves are thinly textured and arranged in a loose rosette with a short petiole but are usually withered by flowering time. The flowers are resupinate and usually small, white and hairy with the dorsal sepal and lateral sepals fused for about half their length. The petals are free from each other but are narrower than the sepals. The tip of the labellum has two lobes and a narrow base forming a shallow depression containing two calli.

== Taxonomy and naming ==
The genus Cheirostylis was first formally described in 1825 by Carl Ludwig Blume and the description was published in Bijdragen tot de flora van Nederlandsch Indië.

The first species of Cheirostylis described by Blume was C. montana, making it the type species.

== Distribution ==
Cheirostylis orchids occur in tropical Africa through tropical Asia from Japan to New Guinea and some Pacific Islands. Seventeen species, eight of which are endemic occur in China and two species are endemic to Australia.

=== List of species ===
The following is a list of species recognised by the Plants of the World Online as at November 2023:

- Cheirostylis acuminata Blume
- Cheirostylis barbata Q.Liu & X.F.Wu
- Cheirostylis bidentata J.J.Sm.
- Cheirostylis bipunctata Aver.
- Cheirostylis boryi (Rchb.f.) Hermans & P.J.Cribb
- Cheirostylis calcarata X.H.Jin & S.C.Chen
- Cheirostylis celebensis P.O'Byrne & J.J.Verm.
- Cheirostylis chinensis Rolfe
- Cheirostylis chuxiongensis J.D.Ya
- Cheirostylis clibborndyeri S.Y.Hu & Baretto
- Cheirostylis cochinchinensis Blume
- Cheirostylis cristata Aver.
- Cheirostylis dendrophila Schltr.
- Cheirostylis divina (Guinea) Summerh.
- Cheirostylis filipetala Aver.
- Cheirostylis flabellata (A.Rich.) Wight
- Cheirostylis foliosa Aver.
- Cheirostylis glandulifera Aver.
- Cheirostylis glandulosa (Aver.) J.M.H.Shaw
- Cheirostylis goldschmidtiana Schltr.
- Cheirostylis grandiflora Blume
- Cheirostylis griffithii Lindl.
- Cheirostylis gunnarii A.N.Rao
- Cheirostylis gymnochiloides (Ridl.) Rchb.f.
- Cheirostylis jamesleungii S.Y.Hu & Barretto
- Cheirostylis javanica J.J.Sm.
- Cheirostylis kabaenae Ormerod
- Cheirostylis latipetala Aver. & Averyanova
- Cheirostylis lepida (Rchb.f.) Rolfe
- Cheirostylis liukiuensis Masam.
- Cheirostylis malipoensis X.H.Jin & S.C.Chen
- Cheirostylis marmorifolia Aver.
- Cheirostylis merrillii (Ames & Quisumb.) Ormerod
- Cheirostylis moniliformis (Griff.) Seidenf.
- Cheirostylis montana Blume
- Cheirostylis monteiroi S.Y.Hu & Barretto
- Cheirostylis nantouensis T.P.Lin
- Cheirostylis notialis D.L.Jones – southern fleshy jewel orchid
- Cheirostylis nuda (Thouars) Ormerod
- Cheirostylis octodactyla Ames
- Cheirostylis orobanchoides (F.Muell.) D.L.Jones & M.A.Clem.
- Cheirostylis ovata (F.M.Bailey) Schltr. – banded fleshy jewel orchid
- Cheirostylis parvifolia Lindl.
- Cheirostylis pingbianensis K.Y.Lang
- Cheirostylis pubescens E.C.Parish & Rchb.f.
- Cheirostylis pusilla Lindl.
- Cheirostylis raymundii Schltr.
- Cheirostylis serpens Aver.
- Cheirostylis sessanica A.N.Rao
- Cheirostylis sherriffii N.Pearce & P.J.Cribb
- Cheirostylis spathulata J.J.Sm.
- Cheirostylis tabiyahanensis (Hayata) N.Pearce & P.J.Cribb
- Cheirostylis takeoi (Hayata) Schltr.
- Cheirostylis thailandica Seidenf.
- Cheirostylis thanmoiensis (Gagnep.) Ormerod
- Cheirostylis tippica A.N.Rao
- Cheirostylis tortilacinia C.S.Leou
- Cheirostylis wenshanensis J.B.Chen, L.J.Chen & W.H.Rao
- Cheirostylis yei J.D.Ya, Z.D.Han & H.Jiang
- Cheirostylis yunnanensis Rolfe
