= Cheirostylis gunnarii =

Conservation status
- Critically Endangered (IUCN 3.1)

Scientific classification
- Kingdom: Plantae
- Clade: Tracheophytes
- Clade: Angiosperms
- Clade: Monocots
- Order: Asparagales
- Family: Orchidaceae
- Subfamily: Orchidoideae
- Tribe: Cranichideae
- Genus: Cheirostylis
- Species: C. gunnarii

Binomial name
- Cheirostylis gunnarii A.N.Rao

Species of orchid

Cheirostylis gunnarii is a Critically endangered species of orchid found in India. It was named after Gunnar Seidenfaden.
