= 2002 AAPT Championships – Singles =

Singles
- 2002 AAPT Championships

Final
- Champion: (United Kingdom) Tim Henman
- Runner-up: (Australia) Mark Philippoussis
- Score: 6–4, 6–7^{(6–8)}, 6–3

Details
- Seeds: 8

Events
Singles	Doubles
← 2001 ·	AAPT Championships	· 2003 →

Tommy Haas was the defending champion but did not compete that year.

Tim Henman won in the final 6–4, 6–7^{(6–8)}, 6–3 against Mark Philippoussis.

== Seeds ==
1. (United Kingdom) Tim Henman (champion)
2. (United States) Pete Sampras (first round)
3. (Sweden) Thomas Enqvist (quarterfinals)
4. (Morocco) Hicham Arazi (semifinals)
5. (Netherlands) Sjeng Schalken (second round)
6. (United Kingdom) Greg Rusedski (quarterfinals)
7. (Sweden) Andreas Vinciguerra (first round)
8. (Croatia) Ivan Ljubičić (quarterfinals)

== Draw ==
=== Key ===
- Q = Qualifier
- WC = Wild card
- LL = Lucky loser
- Alt = Alternate
- SE = Special exempt
- PR = Protected ranking
- ITF = ITF entry
- JE = Junior exempt
- w/o = Walkover
- r = Retired
- d = Defaulted
- SR = Special ranking

=== Finals ===
Semifinals
1	(United Kingdom) Tim Henman	7	4	6
(Spain) Alberto Martín	5	6	2
4	(Morocco) Hicham Arazi	4	1
WC	(Australia) Mark Philippoussis	6	6

Final
1	(United Kingdom) Tim Henman	6	6^{6}	6
WC	(Australia) Mark Philippoussis	4	7^{8}	2

=== Top half ===
First round
1	(United Kingdom) T Henman	6	6^{5}	6
Q	(Australia) R Fromberg	3	7^{7}	0
LL	(Zimbabwe) W Black	6^{4}	7^{7}	0
(Denmark) K Carlsen	7^{7}	6^{3}	6
(Brazil) A Sá	1	2
WC	(Australia) S Draper	6	6
(Spain) J Díaz	3	6^{4}
6	(United Kingdom) G Rusedski	6	7^{7}
3	(Sweden) T Enqvist	6	6
(Chile) M Ríos	0	3
(France) J Golmard	6	6
(Australia) W Arthurs	4	0
(Argentina) J I Chela	6	6
Q	(Paraguay) R Delgado	1	3
(Spain) A Martín	6	6
7	(Sweden) A Vinciguerra	3	4

Second round
1	(United Kingdom) T Henman	7^{7}
(Denmark) K Carlsen	6^{2}	r
WC	(Australia) S Draper	1	6	4
6	(United Kingdom) G Rusedski	6	3	6
3	(Sweden) T Enqvist	6	4	6
(France) J Golmard	4	6	1
(Argentina) J I Chela	2	5
(Spain) A Martín	6	7

Quarterfinals
1	(United Kingdom) T Henman	6	6
6	(United Kingdom) G Rusedski	4	4
3	(Sweden) T Enqvist	6	4	3
(Spain) A Martín	3	6	6

Semifinals
1	(United Kingdom) T Henman	7	4	6
(Spain) A Martín	5	6	2

=== Bottom half ===
First round
8	(Croatia) I Ljubičić	7^{7}	7^{15}
(United States) M Russell	6^{2}	6^{13}
(Chile) N Massú	6	6
(Hungary) A Sávolt	2	1
(Australia) A Ilie	3	1
Q	(France) P-H Mathieu	6	6
(Switzerland) M Kratochvil	3	6	6^{3}
4	(Morocco) H Arazi	6	2	7^{7}
5	(Netherlands) S Schalken	6	6
Q	(United States) A Kim	3	2
WC	(Australia) M Philippoussis	6	6
(France) J Boutter	3	4
(South Africa) W Ferreira	3	6	3
(France) M Llodra	6	3	6
(United States) T Martin	3	6	6
WC/2	(United States) P Sampras	6	3	4

Second round
8	(Croatia) I Ljubičić	7^{7}	7
(Chile) N Massú	6^{5}	5
Q	(France) P-H Mathieu	4	6	2
4	(Morocco) H Arazi	6	0	6
5	(Netherlands) S Schalken	0	3
WC	(Australia) M Philippoussis	6	6
(France) M Llodra	5	4
(United States) T Martin	7	6

Quarterfinals
8	(Croatia) I Ljubičić	1^{r}
4	(Morocco) H Arazi	4
WC	(Australia) M Philippoussis	4	6	6
(United States) T Martin	6	2	2

Semifinals
4	(Morocco) H Arazi	4	1
WC	(Australia) M Philippoussis	6	6
