= 2002 AAPT Championships =

- Date: 31 December 2001 – 6 January 2002
- Edition: 25th
- Category: International Series
- Draw: 32S / 16D
- Prize money: $332,000
- Surface: Hard / Outdoor
- Location: Adelaide, Australia
- Venue: Memorial Drive Park

Champions

Singles
- (United Kingdom) Tim Henman

Doubles
- (Zimbabwe) Wayne Black / (Zimbabwe) Kevin Ullyett
- AAPT Championships

The 2002 AAPT Championships was a men's ATP tennis tournament played on outdoor hard courts in Adelaide in Australia and was part of the International Series of the 2002 ATP Tour. It was the 25th edition of the tournament and ran from 31 December 2001 through 6 January 2002. Tim Henman won the singles title.

== Finals ==
=== Singles ===
(United Kingdom) Tim Henman defeated (Australia) Mark Philippoussis 6–4, 6–7^{(6–8)}, 6–3

- It was Henman's only title of the year and the 12th of his career.

=== Doubles ===
(Zimbabwe) Wayne Black / (Zimbabwe) Kevin Ullyett defeated (United States) Bob Bryan / (United States) Mike Bryan 7–5, 6–2

- It was Black's 1st title of the year and the 8th of his career. It was Ullyett's 1st title of the year and the 14th of his career.
