= 2003 AAPT Championships – Doubles =

Doubles
- 2003 AAPT Championships

Final
- Champions: (South Africa) Jeff Coetzee (South Africa) Chris Haggard
- Runners-up: (France) Arnaud Clément (France) Michaël Llodra
- Score: 2–6, 6–4, 7–6^{(9–7)}

Events
Singles	Doubles
← 2002 ·	AAPT Championships	· 2004 →

Wayne Black and Kevin Ullyett were the defending champions but lost in the first round to Alberto Martín and Mariano Zabaleta.

Jeff Coetzee and Chris Haggard won in the final 2–6, 6–4, 7–6^{(9–7)} against Arnaud Clément and Michaël Llodra.

== Seeds ==
1. (United States) Bob Bryan / (United States) Mike Bryan (quarterfinals)
2. (United States) Donald Johnson / (United States) Jared Palmer (quarterfinals)
3. (Zimbabwe) Wayne Black / (Zimbabwe) Kevin Ullyett (first round)
4. (Australia) Joshua Eagle / (Australia) Andrew Kratzmann (quarterfinals)

== Draw ==
=== Key ===
- Q = Qualifier
- WC = Wild card
- LL = Lucky loser
- Alt = Alternate
- SE = Special exempt
- PR = Protected ranking
- ITF = ITF entry
- JE = Junior exempt
- w/o = Walkover
- r = Retired
- d = Defaulted
- SR = Special ranking

First round
1	(United States) B Bryan (United States) M Bryan	3	6	6
(Argentina) G Etlis (Argentina) M Rodríguez	6	2	4
(Belarus) M Mirnyi (United States) J Morrison	6	6
WC	(Australia) A Fisher (Australia) S Huss	4	4
3	(Zimbabwe) W Black (Zimbabwe) K Ullyett	4	6	4
(Spain) A Martín (Argentina) M Zabaleta	6	2	6
(Australia) A Florent (Croatia) I Ljubičić	6	7^{7}
WC	(Australia) R Henry (Australia) T Reid	4	6^{4}
(South Africa) W Ferreira (United States) S Humphries	4	4
(South Africa) J Coetzee (South Africa) C Haggard	6	6
(Netherlands) R Krajicek (Netherlands) M Verkerk	6^{3}	3
4	(Australia) J Eagle (Australia) A Kratzmann	7^{7}	6
(Belgium) O Rochus (Belgium) T Vanhoudt	6	4	4
(Australia) P Hanley (Israel) H Levy	3	6	6
(Russia) N Davydenko (Romania) A Voinea	6^{4}	3
2	(United States) D Johnson (United States) J Palmer	7^{7}	6

Quarterfinals
1	(United States) B Bryan (United States) M Bryan	7^{8}	6^{4}	2
(Belarus) M Mirnyi (United States) J Morrison	6^{6}	7^{7}	6
(Spain) A Martín (Argentina) M Zabaleta	6^{3}	2
(Australia) A Florent (Croatia) I Ljubičić	7^{7}	6
(South Africa) J Coetzee (South Africa) C Haggard	7	7
4	(Australia) J Eagle (Australia) A Kratzmann	5	5
(Australia) P Hanley (Israel) H Levy	6	6
2	(United States) D Johnson (United States) J Palmer	4	4

Semifinals
(Belarus) M Mirnyi (United States) J Morrison	6	6
(Australia) A Florent (Croatia) I Ljubičić	4	1
(South Africa) J Coetzee (South Africa) C Haggard	6	3	7^{7}
(Australia) P Hanley (Israel) H Levy	4	6	6^{5}

Final
(Belarus) M Mirnyi (United States) J Morrison	6	4	6^{7}
(South Africa) J Coetzee (South Africa) C Haggard	2	6	7^{9}
