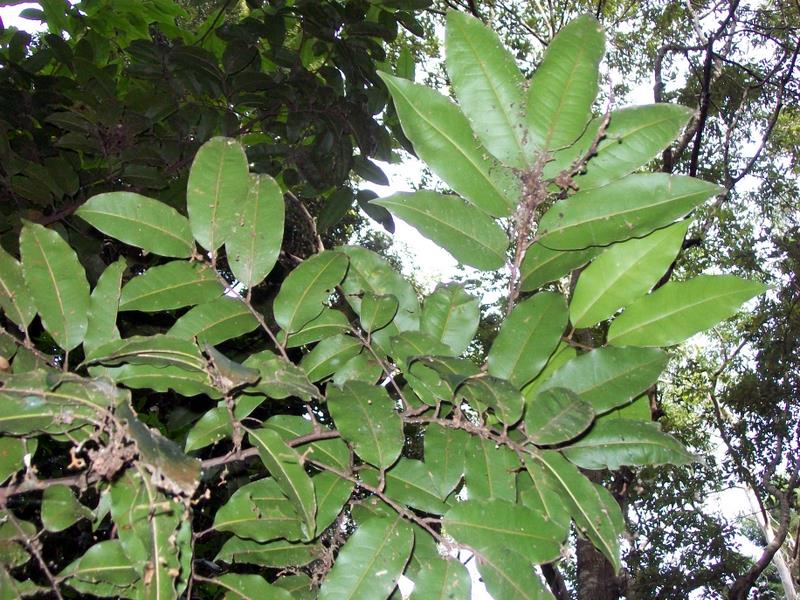
- Mischocarpus pyriformis foliage

Scientific classification
- Kingdom: Plantae
- Clade: Tracheophytes
- Clade: Angiosperms
- Clade: Eudicots
- Clade: Rosids
- Order: Sapindales
- Family: Sapindaceae
- Subfamily: Sapindoideae
- Genus: Mischocarpus; Blume

Type species
- Mischocarpus sundaicus Blume

Species
- See text

= Mischocarpus =

Genus of trees

Mischocarpus is a genus of about nineteen species of trees known to science, constituting part of the plant family Sapindaceae. They grow naturally from Australia and New Guinea, though Malesia as far north as the Philippines, through SE. Asia, Indo-China and S. China, to India at their farthest west. The eleven Australian species known to science grow naturally in the rainforests of the eastern coastal zone of New South Wales and Queensland, from Newcastle northwards through to north-eastern Queensland and Cape York Peninsula.

== Naming and classification ==
In 1825 Carl L. Blume first formally published this genus name and its type species M. sundaicus.

In 1879 Ludwig A. T. Radlkofer first formally published new names of many species.

In 1977 R. W. J. M. van der Ham published a revision of the genus, including new names of species.

== Species ==
This listing was sourced from the Australian Plant Name Index and Australian Plant Census, Flora Malesiana, botanical science journal papers, and the Flora of China.:

- Mischocarpus ailae Guymer (was subsumed within M. lachnocarpus), woolly bush apple – Endemic to rainforests of NE. NSW & SE. Qld, Australia
- Mischocarpus albescens S.T.Reynolds – Daintree region endemic, NE. Qld, Australia
- Mischocarpus anodontus (F.Muell.) Radlk. – NE. NSW to CE. to NE. Qld, Australia
- Mischocarpus australis S.T.Reynolds – CE. NSW through to SE. Qld, Australia
- Mischocarpus exangulatus (F.Muell.) Radlk. – Cape York Peninsula and NE. Qld endemic, Australia
- Mischocarpus grandissimus (F.Muell.) Radlk. – NE. Qld endemic, Australia
- Mischocarpus hainanensis H.S.Lo – Hainan, China
- Mischocarpus lachnocarpus (F.Muell.) Radlk. (previously M. ailae was subsumed within here) – NE. Qld to Cape York Peninsula, Australia and New Guinea
- Mischocarpus largifolius Radlk. – Solomon Islands to New Guinea
- Mischocarpus macrocarpus S.T.Reynolds – NE. to CE. Qld, Australia
- Mischocarpus montanus C.T.White (Australian plants previously included in M. pyriformis subsp. retusus as a misapplied name) – endemic to mountains of NE. Qld, Australia
- Mischocarpus paradoxus Radlk. – New Guinea
- Mischocarpus pentapetalus (Roxb.) Radlk. – India, S. China through SE. Asia to W. Malesia as far as a line from Philippines–Borneo–Java
- Mischocarpus pyriformis (F.Muell.) Radlk. – C. coast NSW through E Qld to NE. Qld, Australia and New Guinea

- subsp. papuanus – New Guinea
- subsp. pyriformis – C. coast NSW northwards to NE Qld, Australia
- subsp. retusus (previously misapplied to Australian M. montanus plants) – New Guinea

- Mischocarpus reticulatus (Radlk.) R.W.Ham – New Guinea
- Mischocarpus stipitatus S.T.Reynolds – Cape York Peninsula to NE. to C. coast Qld, Australia
- Mischocarpus sundaicus Blume – India, S. China, SE. Asia and through Malesia
- Mischocarpus triqueter Radlk. – Philippines

Species accepted by the authoritative Flora Malesiana while awaiting formal publication, as provisionally published names and descriptions

- Mischocarpus prob. spec. nov.: R.W.Ham (UPNG (Millar) 1042 (K)) – New Guinea
