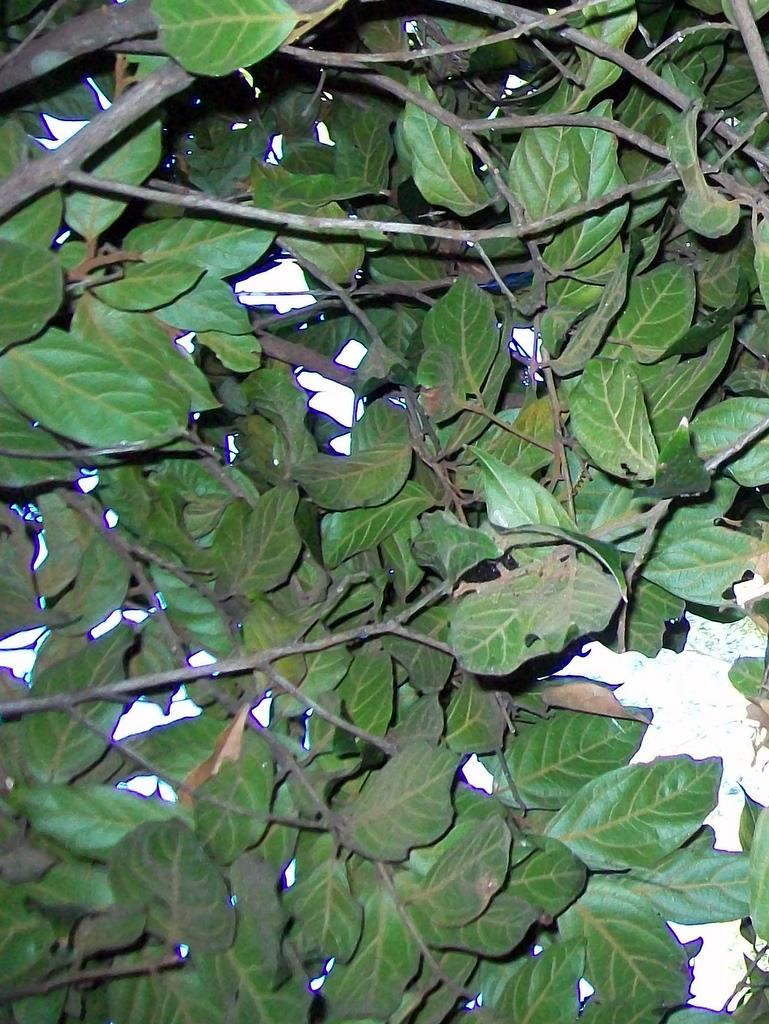
- Foliage

Scientific classification
- Kingdom: Plantae
- Clade: Tracheophytes
- Clade: Angiosperms
- Clade: Magnoliids
- Order: Laurales
- Family: Lauraceae
- Genus: Endiandra
- Species: E. muelleri
- Subspecies: E. m. subsp. bracteata

Trinomial name
- Endiandra muelleri subsp. bracteata B.Hyland

Synonyms
- Endiandra muelleri Meisn.

= Endiandra muelleri subsp. bracteata =

Subspecies of tree

Endiandra muelleri subsp. bracteata, is a rare rainforest tree growing in eastern Australia. Listed as endangered by extinction. It is a subspecies of the tree known as green-leaved rose walnut, or Mueller's walnut, Endiandra muelleri. It occurs from Maclean, New South Wales to Mackay, Queensland, usually in sub tropical rainforest at the lower altitudes.

If differs from the autonym Endiandra muelleri subsp. muelleri in several respects, mostly regarding small hairs:

- twigs have crooked or twisted hairs, (as well as straight) hairs
- twig hairs can be upright (as well as flat)
- the outer envelope of the flower is hairless (the perianth)
- small branchlets and the lower leaf veins are rusty red with hairs
- leaf domatia or hairy tufts usually absent
