= Broken Head, New South Wales =

Broken Head
- other
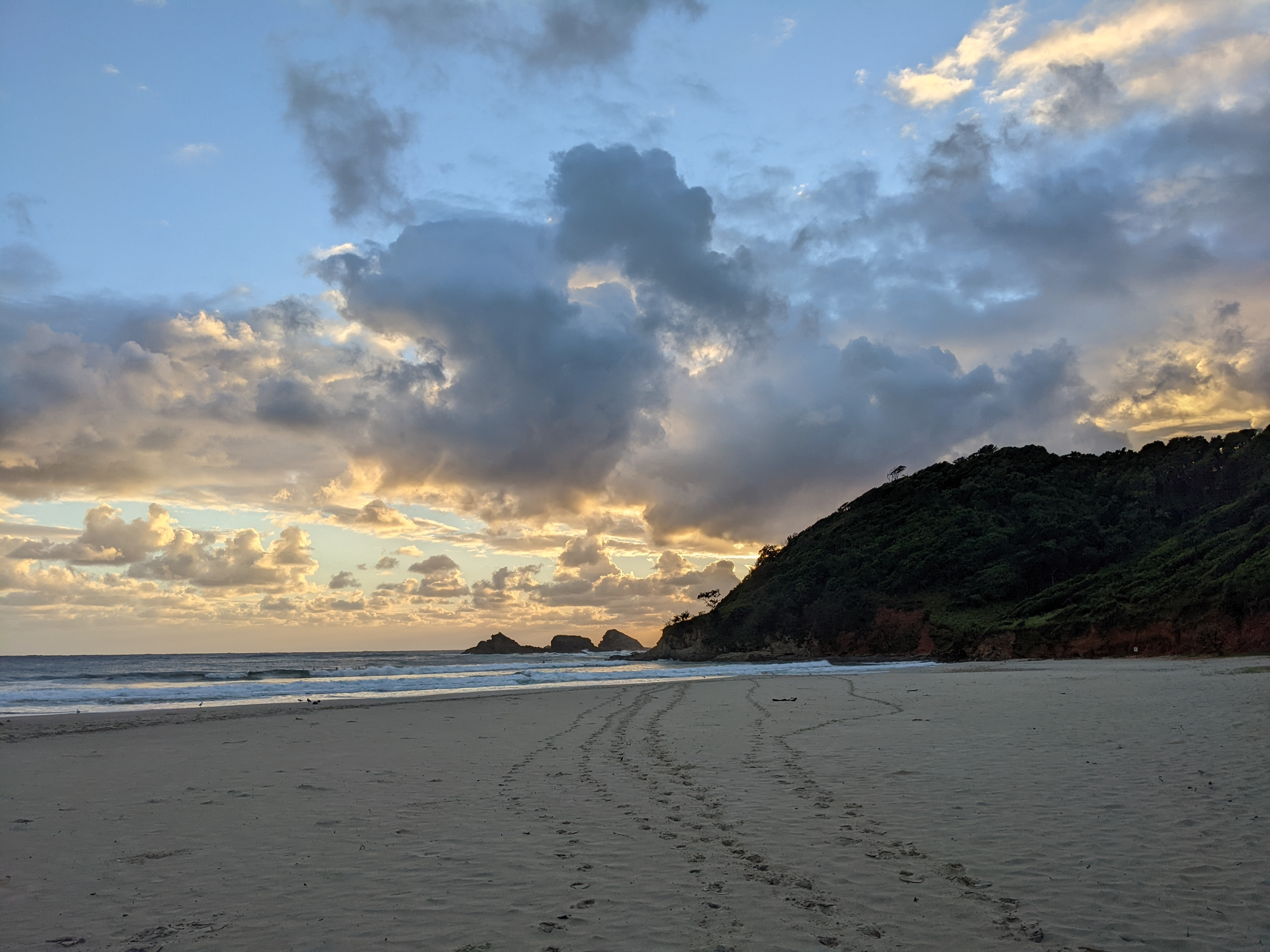
- Broken Head from the beach

- Coordinates: 28°43′S 153°37′E
- Country: Australia
- State: New South Wales

Population
  - Total(s): 385 (SAL 2021)
- Website: Broken Head

Broken Head is a coastal feature (promontory/headland) and suburb located in the Northern Rivers region of New South Wales, Australia, approximately 9 km south of Cape Byron, the easternmost point of Australia, the closest town being Byron Bay. The locality is within the Byron Shire local government area. Immediately adjacent to the headland is the 98-hectare (240-acre) Broken Head Nature Reserve which contains an intact segment of littoral rainforest.

The Traditional Owners of Broken Head, and its surrounds, are the Arakwal people of the Bundjalung Nation.

The area is noted for its Aboriginal culture, rainforest walks, whale watching and fishing from pristine beaches, and it is also highly regarded as a surfing locality. The Broken Head Holiday Park is currently administered by the indigenous Arakwal people, having been passed to their control by the New South Wales Crown Lands Department in 2009.
