= 2004 AAPT Championships – Singles =

Singles
- 2004 AAPT Championships

Final
- Champion: (Slovakia) Dominik Hrbatý
- Runner-up: (France) Michaël Llodra
- Score: 6–4, 6–0

Details
- Seeds: 8

Events
Singles	Doubles
← 2003 ·	AAPT Championships	· 2005 →

Nikolay Davydenko was the defending champion but did not compete that year.

Dominik Hrbatý won in the final 6–4, 6–0 against Michaël Llodra.

== Seeds ==
1. (South Africa) Wayne Ferreira (first round)
2. (United States) Vince Spadea (quarterfinals)
3. (France) Arnaud Clément (second round)
4. (United States) Robby Ginepri (first round)
5. (United States) Taylor Dent (semifinals)
6. (Finland) Jarkko Nieminen (semifinals)
7. (Spain) Alberto Martín (second round)
8. (Ecuador) Nicolás Lapentti (second round)

== Draw ==
=== Key ===
- Q = Qualifier
- WC = Wild card
- LL = Lucky loser
- Alt = Alternate
- SE = Special exempt
- PR = Protected ranking
- ITF = ITF entry
- JE = Junior exempt
- w/o = Walkover
- r = Retired
- d = Defaulted
- SR = Special ranking

=== Finals ===
Semifinals
6	(Finland) Jarkko Nieminen	4	2
(Slovakia) Dominik Hrbatý	6	6
5	(United States) Taylor Dent	3	5
Q	(France) Michaël Llodra	6	7

Final
(Slovakia) Dominik Hrbatý	6	6
Q	(France) Michaël Llodra	4	0

=== Top half ===
First round
1	(South Africa) W Ferreira	1	0
WC	(Australia) T Reid	6	6
(Argentina) G Cañas	4	4
(Netherlands) R Sluiter	6	6
Q	(Germany) D Elsner	1	1
(Italy) D Sanguinetti	6	6
(South Africa) W Moodie	6	6^{6}	5
6	(Finland) J Nieminen	4	7^{8}	7
4	(United States) R Ginepri	3	4
(France) C Saulnier	6	6
Q	(Switzerland) S Wawrinka	4	2
(United Kingdom) G Rusedski	6	6
Q	(France) J Benneteau	1	4
(Slovakia) D Hrbatý	6	6
(Croatia) M Ančić	3	7^{8}	6^{3}
7	(Spain) A Martín	6	6^{6}	7^{7}

Second round
WC	(Australia) T Reid	6	6
(Netherlands) R Sluiter	3	2
(Italy) D Sanguinetti	6^{2}	4
6	(Finland) J Nieminen	7^{7}	6
(France) C Saulnier	6	6
(United Kingdom) G Rusedski	2	2
(Slovakia) D Hrbatý	6	6
7	(Spain) A Martín	2	3

Quarterfinals
WC	(Australia) T Reid	2	5
6	(Finland) J Nieminen	6	7
(France) C Saulnier	4	6^{1}
(Slovakia) D Hrbatý	6	7^{7}

Semifinals
6	(Finland) J Nieminen	4	2
(Slovakia) D Hrbatý	6	6

=== Bottom half ===
First round
5	(United States) T Dent	6	6
(Peru) L Horna	2	3
(United States) B Vahaly	2	2
(Slovakia) K Beck	6	6
WC	(Sweden) T Johansson	6	6
(Belgium) C Rochus	1	3
(Romania) V Hănescu	3	2
3	(France) A Clément	6	6
8	(Ecuador) N Lapentti	7	6
(Georgia (country)) I Labadze	5	1
Q	(France) M Llodra	6	6
(Germany) L Burgsmüller	3	2
WC	(Australia) W Arthurs	6^{5}	7^{7}	7
(Croatia) I Karlović	7^{7}	6^{4}	5
(Austria) J Melzer	6^{4}	2
2	(United States) V Spadea	7^{7}	6

Second round
5	(United States) T Dent	7^{8}	7
(Slovakia) K Beck	6^{6}	5
WC	(Sweden) T Johansson	6	6
3	(France) A Clément	4	3
8	(Ecuador) N Lapentti	1	3
Q	(France) M Llodra	6	6
WC	(Australia) W Arthurs	4	7^{10}	3
2	(United States) V Spadea	6	6^{8}	6

Quarterfinals
5	(United States) T Dent	7^{7}	6
WC	(Sweden) T Johansson	6^{2}	2
Q	(France) M Llodra	6	6
2	(United States) V Spadea	4	2

Semifinals
5	(United States) T Dent	3	5
Q	(France) M Llodra	6	7
