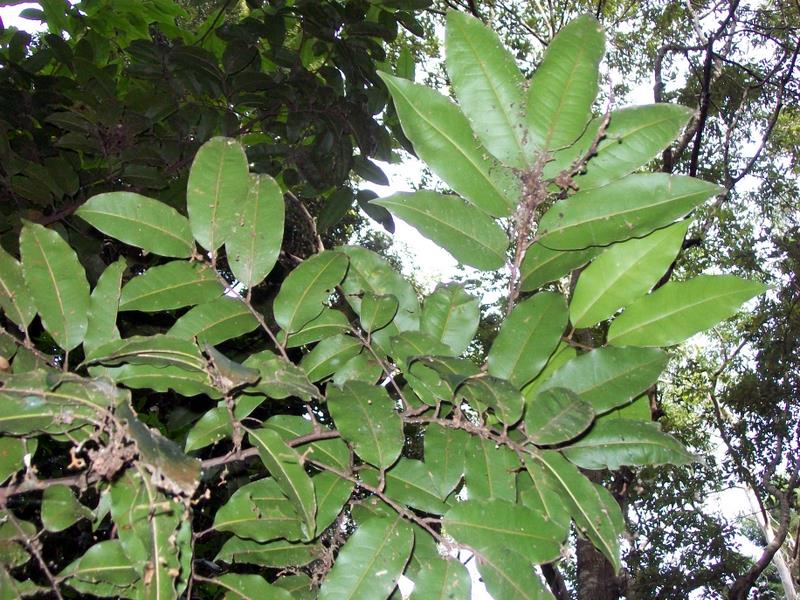

Scientific classification
- Kingdom: Plantae
- Clade: Tracheophytes
- Clade: Angiosperms
- Clade: Eudicots
- Clade: Rosids
- Order: Sapindales
- Family: Sapindaceae
- Genus: Mischocarpus
- Species: M. pyriformis

Binomial name
- Mischocarpus pyriformis (F.Muell.) Radlk.

Synonyms
- Ratonia pyriformis (F.Muell.) Benth.; Schmidelia pyriformis F.Muell.; Cupania laurifolia Ettingsh.

= Mischocarpus pyriformis =

Pear fruited tamarind

Species of tree

Mischocarpus pyriformis, known as the pear fruited tamarind, is a rainforest tree of eastern Australia. Occurring from Seal Rocks, New South Wales to as far north as Cooktown in tropical Queensland. The sub species found in New South Wales is Mischocarpus pyriformis subsp. pyriformis.

The habitat is rainforest by streams or near the ocean, also found in dry rainforest. The generic name Mischocarpus refers to the stalk tapering into the top part of the fruit. "Pear shaped" is the translation of the species name pyriformis.

== Description ==
A tree to 18 metres (59 ft) tall with a trunk diameter of 50 cm (20 in). An attractive small tree with appealing glossy foliage. The trunk is usually seen as cylindrical, but other times irregular in shape. Bark is varying shades of grey, mostly smooth apart from raised bumps or pustules. Small branches thick and smooth, a brown or greenish brown colour.

=== Leaves ===
Compound leaves are 8–30 cm (3–12 in) long, containing 4 to 9 leaflets. Leaflets glossy, without teeth, ovate to ovate lanceolate in shape, usually 2–15 cm (0.8–5.9 in) long and 2–6 cm (0.8–2.4 in) wide. Leaf veins noticeable on both sides of the leaf, more evident below. Many net veins will be seen.

=== Flowers, fruit and germination ===
Scented cream coloured flowers form on panicles from February to April. The yellow pear shaped capsule is on a stalk 6 mm long. It matures from October to December. The capsule usually contains two black ovate shaped seeds, 9 mm long. Surrounded by red aril. Fruit eaten by the Lewin's honeyeater and other birds. Not all fruit capsules contain seeds. Fresh seeds germinate quickly and reliably. Though dormant seeds may continue to germinate after three months.
