= 2004 AAPT Championships =

- Date: 5 – 11 January
- Edition: 27th
- Category: International Series
- Surface: Hard / Outdoor
- Location: Adelaide, Australia

Champions

Singles
- (Slovakia) Dominik Hrbatý

Doubles
- (United States) Bob Bryan / (United States) Mike Bryan
- AAPT Championships

The 2004 AAPT Championships was a tennis tournament played on outdoor hard courts in Adelaide in Australia and was part of the International Series of the 2004 ATP Tour. The tournament ran from 5 through 11 January 2004.

== Finals ==
=== Singles ===
(Slovakia) Dominik Hrbatý defeated (France) Michaël Llodra 6–4, 6–0

- It was Hrbatý's 1st title of the year and the 6th of his career.

=== Doubles ===
(United States) Bob Bryan / (United States) Mike Bryan defeated (France) Arnaud Clément / (France) Michaël Llodra 7–5, 6–3

- It was Bob Bryan's 1st title of the year and the 15th of his career. It was Mike Bryan's 1st title of the year and the 17th of his career.
