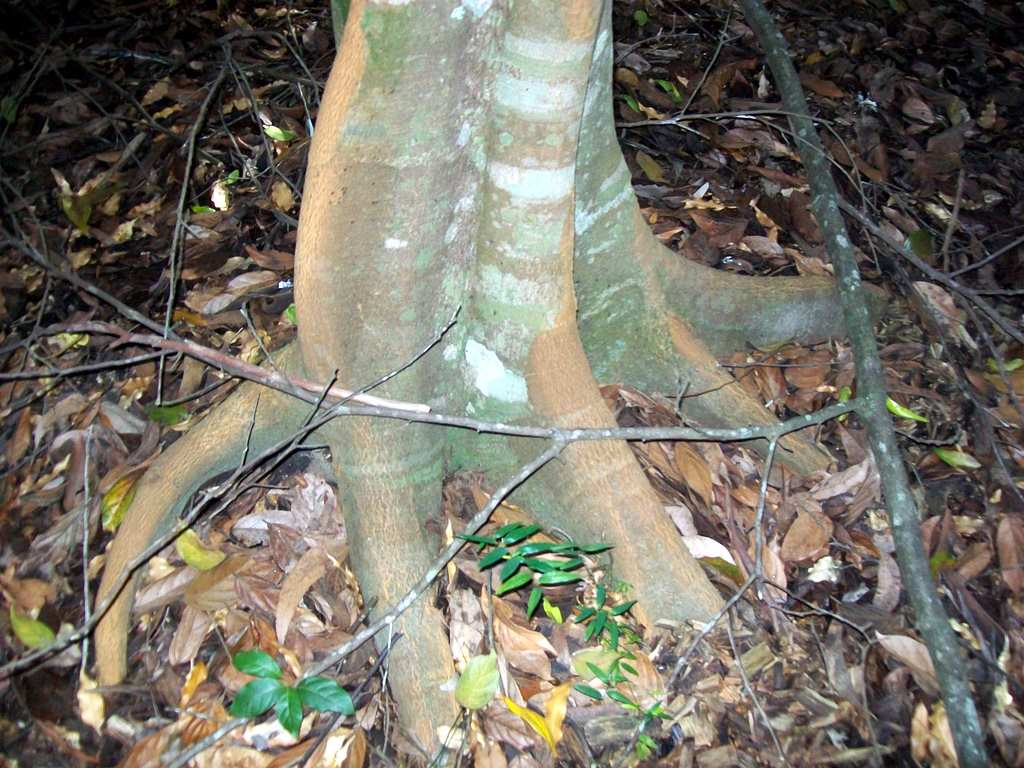
- the flanged and buttressed trunk

Conservation status
- Least Concern (IUCN 3.1)

Scientific classification
- Kingdom: Plantae
- Clade: Embryophytes
- Clade: Tracheophytes
- Clade: Angiosperms
- Clade: Magnoliids
- Order: Laurales
- Family: Lauraceae
- Genus: Endiandra
- Species: E. muelleri

Binomial name
- Endiandra muelleri Meisn.

= Endiandra muelleri =

Green-leaved rose walnut

Species of tree

Endiandra muelleri is a rainforest tree of eastern Australia. Its habitat is in warm temperate rainforests on poorer soils. Distributed from the Allyn River in the Barrington Tops region of New South Wales in the south to Kroombit Tops to the north in central Queensland.

Common names include Mueller's walnut or green-leaved rose walnut. The tree is not a walnut, being a laurel. It is named after the prolific colonial botanist, Ferdinand von Mueller.

== Subspecies ==
There are two types of Endiandra muelleri, this plant Endiandra muelleri muelleri and the endangered Endiandra muelleri bracteata. For the differences in the sub-species, see Endiandra muelleri bracteata.

== Description ==
Endiandra muelleri subsp. muelleri is a tree reaching 30 metres tall with a trunk diameter of 75 cm. The base of the tree may be buttressed and flanged. The brown bark is irregular, with craters, depressions, and loose plates of bark. Leaf bearing twigs are green coloured with fine flat straight hairs. New shoots feature bright pink or red leaves and fawn coloured hairs.

Leaves are 6 to 12 cm long, 3 to 5 cm wide. Green, shiny and smooth on both surfaces, paler beneath. Leaves broad lanceolate to elliptic in shape with a leaf stem from 3 to 6 mm long. Occasionally one to four hairy tufts or bumps are seen on the underside of the leaf, next to the joining of leaf veins and mid-vein on Endiandra muelleri subsp. muelleri.

=== Flowers, fruit and regeneration ===
Greenish pink flowers form on panicles from the leaf axils in the months of November to January. With Endiandra muelleri subsp. muelleri, the perianth lobes are hairy on the outside. The fruit is blackish/dark blue drupe, 15 to 25 mm in length. Maturing from March to April. The fruit is eaten by a variety of birds, including the rose-crowned fruit dove, regent bowerbird, superb fruit-dove, and wompoo fruit-dove. It is advisable to remove the flesh from the seed before sowing. Germination occurs after around two months.
