= Cheirostylis ovata =

Banded fleshy jewel orchid

Scientific classification
- Kingdom: Plantae
- Clade: Tracheophytes
- Clade: Angiosperms
- Clade: Monocots
- Order: Asparagales
- Family: Orchidaceae
- Subfamily: Orchidoideae
- Tribe: Cranichideae
- Subtribe: Goodyerinae
- Genus: Cheirostylis
- Species: C. ovata

Binomial name
- Cheirostylis ovata (F.M.Bailey) Schltr.

Synonyms
- * Gastrodia ovata F.M.Bailey; Zeuxine attenuata R.S.Rogers & C.T.White

Species of flowering plant

Cheirostylis ovata, commonly known as the banded fleshy jewel orchid, is a species of orchid that is endemic Queensland where it grows in rainforest and moist woodland. It has between three and seven egg-shaped leaves and up to six small white flowers with two lobes on the end of the labellum.

== Description ==
Cheirostylis ovata is a tuberous, perennial herb with a rosette of between three and seven leaves, 2.5–5 mm (0.1–0.2 in) long and 1–2 mm (0.04–0.08 in) wide lying flat on the ground. Up to six resupinate white flowers, 10–14 mm (0.4–0.6 in) long and 8–10 mm (0.3–0.4 in) wide are borne on a flowering stem 100–250 mm (4–10 in) tall. The dorsal sepal is 7–8 mm (0.28–0.31 in) long, about 4 mm (0.2 in) wide and fused with the petals and with the lower half of the lateral sepals to form a tube. The lateral sepals are a similar size to the dorsal sepal and the petals are the same length but about half as wide. The labellum is 12–14 mm (0.5–0.6 in) long and about 9 mm (0.4 in) wide, its tip divided into two lobes with broad teeth on the edges. Flowering occurs from August to October.

== Taxonomy and naming ==
The banded fleshy jewel orchid was first formally described in 1896 by Frederick Manson Bailey who gave it the name Gastrodia ovata and published the name in the Department of Agriculture Botany Bulletin. In 1911, Rudolf Schlechter changed the name to Cheirostylis ovata. The specific epithet (ovata) is a Latin word meaning "egg-shaped".

== Distribution and habitat ==
The banded fleshy jewel orchid grows in leaf litter and on rocks in rainforest and moist woodland between the Iron Range and Eungella.
