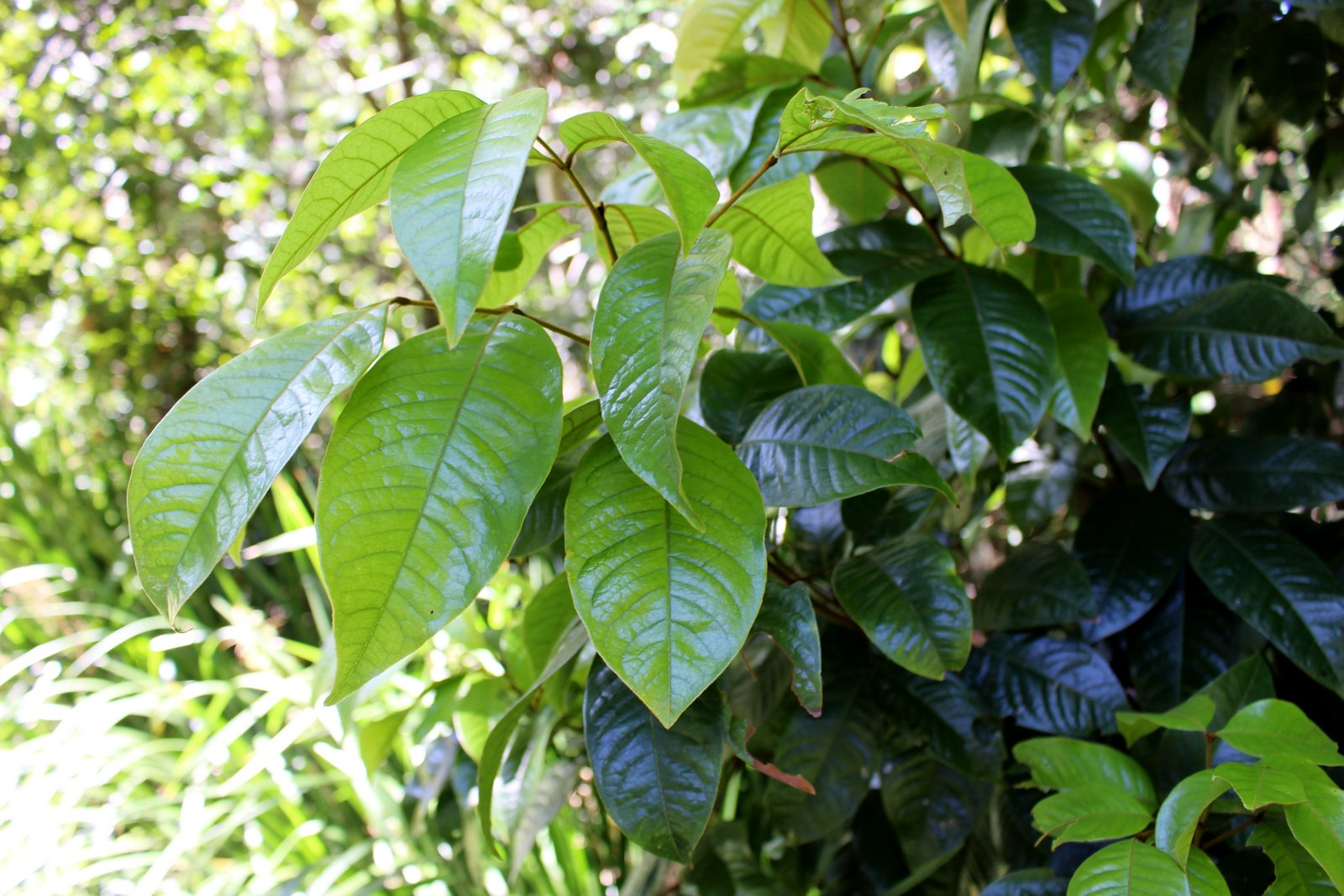

Scientific classification
- Kingdom: Plantae
- Clade: Embryophytes
- Clade: Tracheophytes
- Clade: Angiosperms
- Clade: Eudicots
- Clade: Rosids
- Order: Sapindales
- Family: Sapindaceae
- Genus: Mischocarpus
- Species: M. lachnocarpus

Binomial name
- Mischocarpus lachnocarpus (F.Muell.) Radlk.

= Mischocarpus lachnocarpus =

Woolly brush apple

Species of tree

Mischocarpus lachnocarpus, the woolly brush apple, is a rainforest tree, mostly seen in tropical north eastern Queensland, Australia.

The woolly brush apple is a tree that can reach about 20 metres in height, with its shoots, branchlets, leaf axes and inflorescences ranging from densely rusty-hairy to nearly hairless. Its leaves generally have two opposite leaflets, while its axillary panicles bear small flowers. The fruit is obovoid or globose, usually rusty-gold or red-orange and covered with rusty hairs on the outside, with a mauve or purple-blue aril. It occurs from Cape York Peninsula to the Cardwell Range in northern Queensland and south along the Queensland New South Wales border ranges to Mullumbimby, as well as in New Guinea, usually on sandy ridges near beaches and at the edges of mangrove swamps.
