= Howell Park (Seattle) =

Public park in Seattle, Washington, U.S.

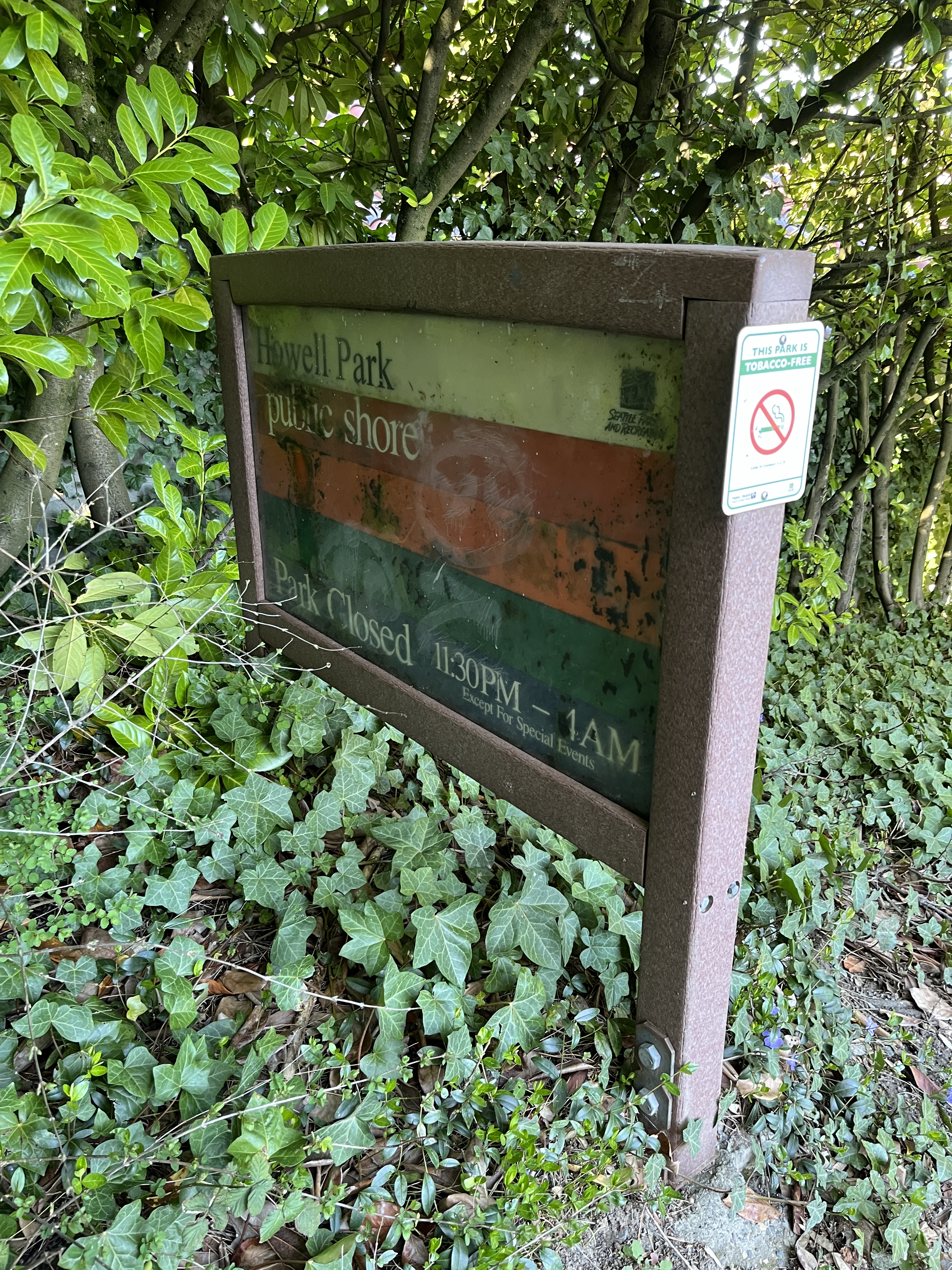
- Sign for the park, 2024
- Interactive map of Howell Park
- Type: Public park
- Location: Madrona, Seattle, Washington, U.S.
- Coordinates: 47°37′3″N 122°16′50″W
- Operator: Seattle Parks and Recreation

Howell Park (also known as Howell Beach Park and Howell Street Park) is a public park in Seattle's Madrona neighborhood, in the U.S. state of Washington. The small beachfront park abuts Lake Washington. It is used for nude recreation and has "historically been more for the boys" (referring to gay men), according to The Stranger. Jacklyn Grambush included Howell Park in Time Out Seattle's 2018 overview of twelve "fabulous" Seattle beaches.

== See also ==
- LGBT culture in Seattle
- List of parks in Seattle
- List of places where social nudity is practised
