= Littoral Rainforests of New South Wales =

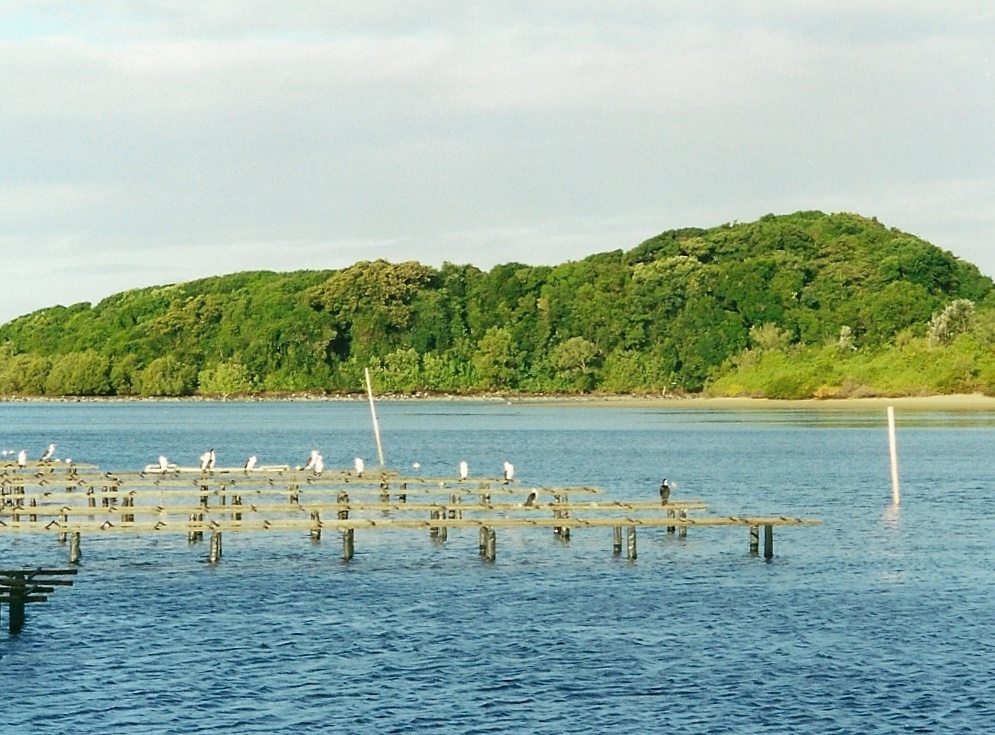
- Littoral Rainforest at Brunswick Heads Nature Reserve, Australia
- Governing body: NSW National Parks and Wildlife Service
- Website: www.environment.nsw.gov.au/nationalparks/parkHome.aspx?id=N0523

The Littoral Rainforests of New South Wales is a group of fragmented and endangered ecological communities found by the coast in eastern Australia. Much of this seaside form has been destroyed by mining, tourist development or housing. It is threatened by extinction in the near future.

The littoral rainforests of Australia extends from North Queensland to Victoria and many offshore islands, with a minority found within New South Wales.

== Description and location ==
Usually seen within two kilometres (1.2 mi) of the coast, from Mimosa Rocks National Park in the south to the border with the state of Queensland. The forest has a closed canopy of around 70% shade. Trees may be up to 30 metres (98 ft) tall in sheltered sites. But it is more often seen 5 to 15 metres (16 to 49 ft) tall. This forest type has been considered a form of sub-tropical rainforest, as only a few rainforest species are restricted to littoral sites.

== Plant species ==
Plants often have thick and leathery leaves, as a protection against sea winds. Vines are common. Tree species are often from the following botanical families: Myrtaceae, Lauraceae, Sapindaceae, Euphorbiaceae, Moraceae and Rutaceae. Salt tolerant species such as plum pine, tuckeroo, red-fruited olive plum, black apple, mock olive and bolwarra are often encountered. Endangered species include the coast fontainea and the scented acronychia. Ferns are less often seen than in nearby sub-tropical rainforests. Non rainforest species are occasionally seen in these forests, such as the coast banksia (Banksia integrifolia) and bangalay (Eucalyptus botryoides).

== Environmental factors ==
The rainforest grows on beach sand, quartz-rich sediments, meta-sediments or on coastal headlands enriched by volcanic minerals. Sea winds add fertility to the sandy soils, with air borne minerals such as calcium, magnesium, potassium and phosphorus. Relative humidity is high, and the climate is equable with higher minimum temperatures than further inland. Rainfall is generally over one metre per year. Salt scalding from the sea winds often produces an even and dense canopy.
