= Arakwal people =

The Arakwal are an Aboriginal Australian people of the state of New South Wales.

== Country ==
In Norman Tindale 's estimation the Arakwal had about 1,800 square kilometres (700 sq mi) of territory, stretching from Ballina and the north side of the Richmond River to Cape Byron. Their inland extension ran as far as Lismore, Casino and Coraki. Their boundaries at Ballina joined those of the Widje hordes of the Badjelang.

== Alternative names ==
- Coo-al
- Jawjumjeri
- Kahwul
- Kogung
- Lismore tribe
- Naiang
- Njung
- Nyung
- Yawkum-yore (Note: yikum was their word for 'no', giving rise to one of the tribe's ethnonyms. (Tindale 1974, p. 191))

Source: Tindale 1974, p. 191

== Sources ==
- Edwards, Charles; Ross, E.; Hogan, Daniel (1887). "Richmond River" (PDF). In Curr, Edward Micklethwaite (ed.). The Australian race: its origin, languages, customs, place of landing in Australia and the routes by which it spread itself over the continent. Vol. 3. Melbourne: J. Ferres. pp. 286–293.
- Hargrave, Edward (21 March 1903a). "Aboriginal dialects". Science of Man. 6 (1): 6–9.
- Hargrave, Edward (22 April 1903b). "Aboriginal dialects". Science of Man. 6 (3): 39–42.
- Hargrave, Edward (25 May 1903c). "Aboriginal dialects". Science of Man. 6 (4): 54–55.
- Hargrave, Edward; Evans, J. (21 March 1903). "Aboriginal dialects". Science of Man. 6 (2): 24–27.
- Livingstone, H. (1892). "Short Grammar and Vocabulary of the Dialect spoken by the Minyung People" (PDF). In Fraser, John (ed.). An Australian language as spoken by the Awabakal, the people of Awaba, or lake Macquarie (near Newcastle, New South Wales) being an account of their language, traditions, and customs. Sydney: C. Potter, Govt. Printer. pp. Appendix 2–27.
- Rankin, T. (22 September 1900). "Aboriginal place names and other words, with their meanings, peculiar to the Richmond and Tweed River districts". Science of Man. 3 (8): 132–134.
- Tindale, Norman Barnett (1974). Aboriginal Tribes of Australia: Their Terrain, Environmental Controls, Distribution, Limits, and Proper Names. Australian National University Press. ISBN 978-0-708-10741-6.
