= Lleyton Hewitt career statistics =

Career finals
Discipline	Type	Won	Lost	Total	WR
Singles	Grand Slam	2	2	4	0.50
Singles	ATP Finals	2	1	3	0.67
Singles	ATP 1000*	2	5	7	0.29
Singles	Olympics	–	–	–	–
Singles	ATP 500	2	–	2	1.00
Singles	ATP 250	22	8	30	0.73
Singles	Total	30	16	46	0.65
Doubles	Grand Slam	1	–	1	1.00
Doubles	ATP Finals	–	–	–	–
Doubles	ATP 1000*	–	–	–	–
Doubles	Olympics	–	–	–	–
Doubles	ATP 500	1	1	2	0.50
Doubles	ATP 250	1	4	2	0.25
Doubles	Total	3	5	8	0.37
1) WR = Winning Rate; 2) * formerly known as "Super 9" (1996–1999), "Tennis Masters Series" (2000–2003) or "ATP Masters Series" (2004–2008).

This is a list of the main career statistics of Australian tennis player Lleyton Hewitt. To date, Hewitt has won thirty ATP singles titles, including two grand slam singles titles, two ATP Masters 1000 singles titles, and two year-ending championships. He was also the runner-up at the 2004 Tennis Masters Cup and the 2004 US Open. Hewitt was first ranked World No. 1 by the Association of Tennis Professionals (ATP) on November 19, 2001.

== Records and career milestones ==
In 1997, aged 15 years and 11 months, Hewitt qualified for the Australian Open, becoming the youngest qualifier in the event's history. The following year, Hewitt (ranked World No. 550 at the time) upset Andre Agassi en route to winning his first ATP singles title at the Next Generation Adelaide International, becoming the third youngest player to win an ATP singles title after Aaron Krickstein and Michael Chang and the lowest ranked ATP singles champion in history. In 2000, Hewitt became the first teenager since Pete Sampras to claim four singles titles in the same season when he won titles in Adelaide, Sydney, Scottsdale and Queen's. His victory at the latter event also meant that he had now won at least one singles title on each playing surface (hard, clay and grass). In September, Hewitt reached his first grand slam semi-final at the US Open, losing to Sampras in straight sets but won his first grand slam title of any sort by winning the doubles event with Max Mirnyi, thus becoming the youngest player (at 19 years and 6 months) to win a grand slam doubles title in the Open era. In November, he reached his first ATP Masters 1000 final in Stuttgart before finishing his season with a round robin loss at the year-ending Tennis Masters Cup, an event which he had qualified for the first time in his career. Hewitt finished the year ranked World No. 7, marking his first finish in the year-end top ten.

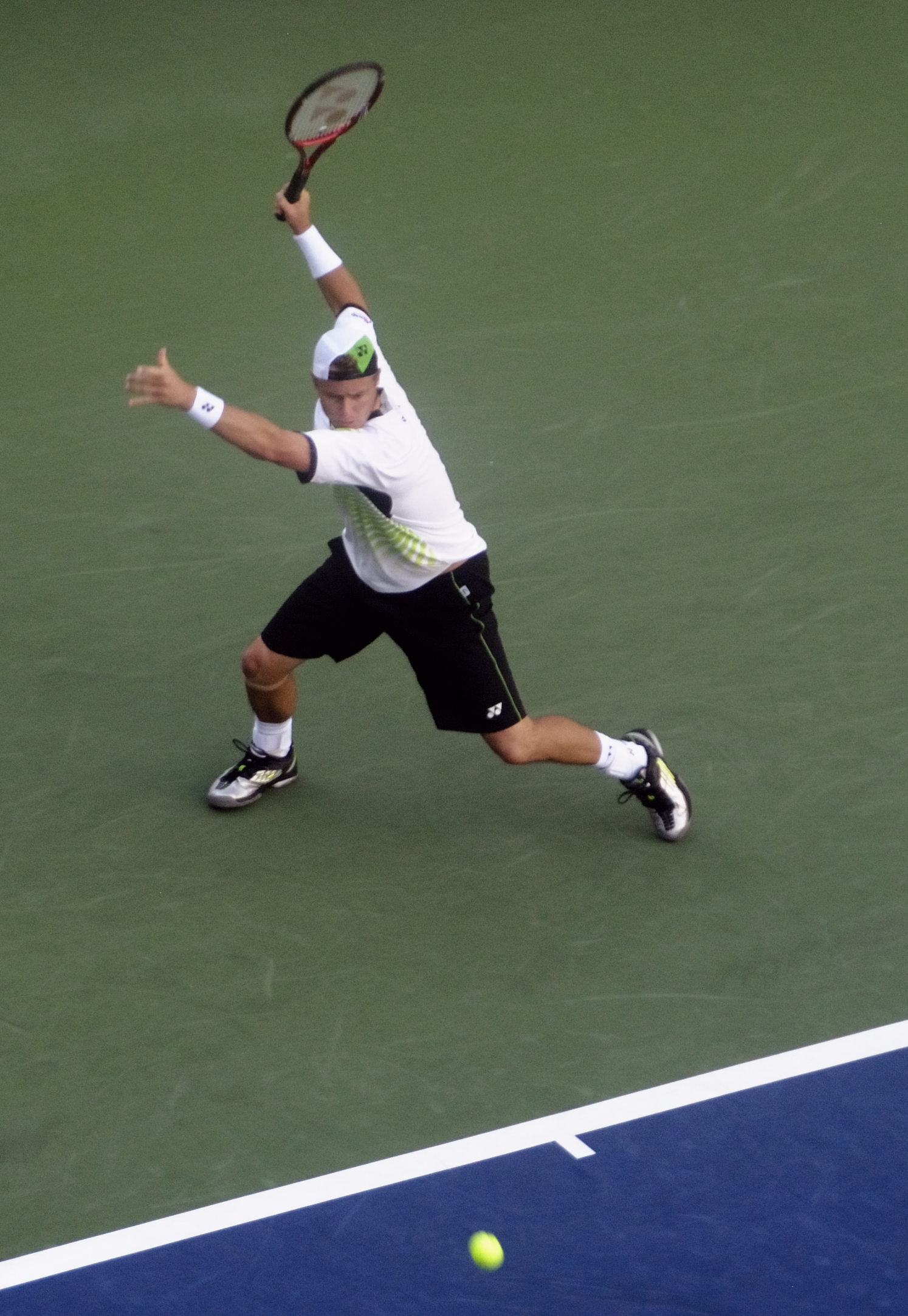
Hewitt won his first grand slam singles title at the US Open in 2001.

In June 2001, Hewitt reached his first quarterfinal at the French Open, losing to Juan Carlos Ferrero in straight sets before going on to win his first grand slam singles title at the US Open, defeating Pete Sampras in the final in straight sets. In November, he won his first year-end championship at the Tennis Masters Cup, becoming the first Australian player to do so and as a result, became the World No. 1 for the first time in his career. Aged 20 years and 8 months at the time, Hewitt was the youngest male to have reached the summit of the ATP Singles Rankings until Carlos Alcaraz achieved this at age 19 in 2022. He finished the year with a tour leading win-loss record of 80–18; six singles titles (tied with Gustavo Kuerten for most titles won this season) and the year-end No. 1 ranking, which was another first for a male Australian player.

After a disappointing start to the 2002 season, Hewitt embarked on a 15-match winning streak, collecting titles in San Jose and Indian Wells, defeating Andre Agassi and Tim Henman respectively before losing in the semi-finals of the NASDAQ–100 Open to Roger Federer, a loss which also ended his 23–match winning streak in American tournaments. Hewitt's match with Agassi was "considered by many to be the year's best final on the ATP World Tour" whilst his triumph over Henman gave him his first ATP Masters 1000 title. In June, Hewitt won his second grand slam singles title at the Wimbledon Championships, defeating first time grand slam finalist David Nalbandian in the championship match before finishing as runner-up to Carlos Moyá at the Cincinnati Masters and ending his US Open title defence with a four set semi-final loss to Agassi. In November, he reached his third ATP Masters 1000 final of the year at the Paris Masters (losing to Marat Safin) then successfully defended his title at the year-ending Tennis Masters Cup, defeating Juan Carlos Ferrero in a five set final lasting 3 hours and 51 minutes. Hewitt finished the year ranked World No. 1 for the second consecutive season, becoming the seventh player to do so and the fourth player to remain at the top of the ATP Singles Rankings for an entire year. He won more singles matches (61) and ATP Masters 1000 matches (23) than any other player this year and tied Agassi for the most singles titles won this season with five. He served a career-best 536 aces throughout the season, led his peers in terms of return games won and points won on his first serve and also earned $4,619,38 in prize money, which remains the highest amount he has earned in a single season.

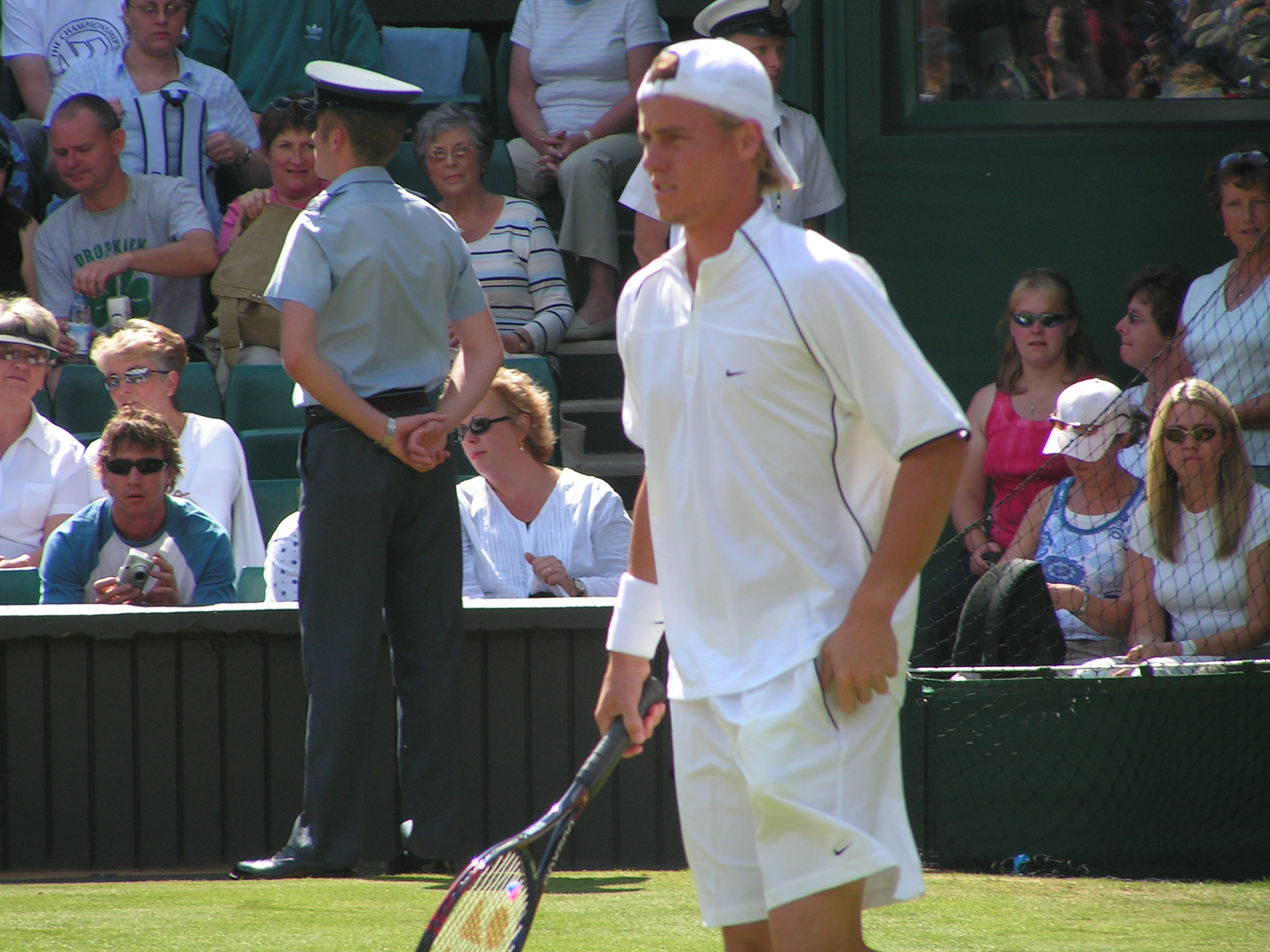
Hewitt won his second grand slam singles title at the Wimbledon Championships in 2002.

2003 was a relatively disappointing season for Hewitt as he lost the World No. 1 ranking after spending seventy-five consecutive weeks at the top spot and ended his Wimbledon title defence with a first round loss to Ivo Karlović, thus becoming the first player since Manuel Santana in 1967 to fail to defend their title by losing in the first round of the event. However, he successfully defended his title at the Pacific Life Open (becoming the first player to do so since Michael Chang from 1997–1998), reached his fourth consecutive quarterfinal at the US Open (losing to eventual runner-up, Juan Carlos Ferrero in four sets) and led Australia to victory in the Davis Cup (defeating Roger Federer in a memorable five set match en route).

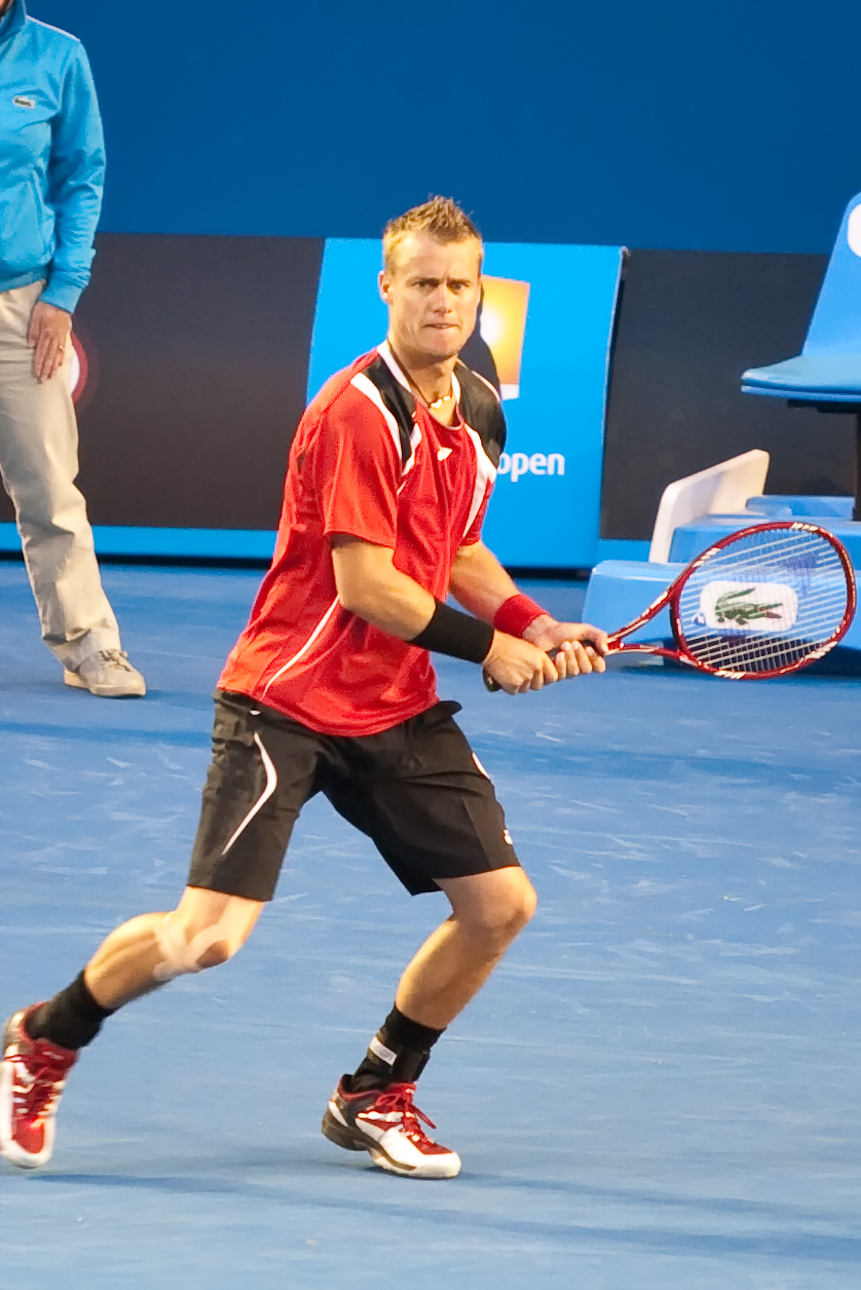
Hewitt during the 2010 Australian Open.

Hewitt returned to form the following year, equalling his career-best of reaching seven singles finals in the one season and compiling his best ever single-season win-loss record in grand slam singles play (17–4). In May, he reached his second quarterfinal at the French Open, losing to the eventual champion Gastón Gaudio in straight sets before reaching his second consecutive grand slam quarterfinal at the Wimbledon Championships where he lost to the World No. 1 and defending champion, Roger Federer in four sets. He also enjoyed a stellar US Open series campaign as he reached his second final at the Cincinnati Masters and won titles in Washington D.C. and Long Island respectively before reaching his second US Open final and third grand slam singles final where he lost to Federer in straight sets. He finished the year by reaching his third final at the year-ending Tennis Masters Cup, once again losing to Federer and ended the year ranked World No. 3. Hewitt began the 2005 season by winning his fourth title at the Medibank International, becoming the first player to win that many titles at the event since John Bromwich in 1940 before defeating Rafael Nadal, David Nalbandian and Andy Roddick en route to his first Australian Open final where he lost in four sets to Marat Safin. By reaching the final, Hewitt had now reached the quarterfinals or better at all four grand slam events and had also become the first male Australian player to reach the Australian Open singles final since Pat Cash in 1988. The remainder of Hewitt's year was highlighted by a finals appearance at the Pacific Life Open and semi-final appearances at the Wimbledon Championships and US Open; he lost on all three occasions to the World No. 1, Roger Federer. Hewitt qualified for the year-ending Tennis Masters Cup for the fifth time in his career but withdrew from the event as his wife was due to give birth to their first child. He ended the year ranked World No. 4, which remains his last finish in the year-end top ten.

In later years, most of Hewitt's best results have come at grass court tournaments, although he did reach the quarterfinals of the 2009 Cincinnati Masters and also won the 2014 Brisbane International, defeating Roger Federer in the final. At the 2009 Wimbledon Championships, Hewitt defeated Juan Martín del Potro en route to his first grand slam quarterfinal in three years where he lost in five sets to the eventual runner-up, Andy Roddick. The following year, Hewitt recovered from a set down to defeat Federer in the final of the Gerry Weber Open, thus ending his 15-match losing streak against the Swiss dating back to 2003. Between July 2012 and July 2014, Hewitt reached three consecutive finals at the Hall of Fame Open, losing to John Isner and Nicolas Mahut respectively before winning the title for the first time with a three set win over Ivo Karlović.

== Performance timelines ==
Key
W	F	SF	QF	#R	RR	Q#	P#	DNQ	A	Z#	PO	G	S	B	NMS	NTI	P	NH

(W) winner; (F) finalist; (SF) semifinalist; (QF) quarterfinalist; (#R) rounds 4, 3, 2, 1; (RR) round-robin stage; (Q#) qualification round; (P#) preliminary round; (DNQ) did not qualify; (A) absent; (Z#) Davis/Fed Cup Zonal Group (with number indication) or (PO) play-off; (G) gold, (S) silver or (B) bronze Olympic/Paralympic medal; (NMS) not a Masters tournament; (NTI) not a Tier I tournament; (P) postponed; (NH) not held; (SR) strike rate (events won / competed); (W–L) win–loss record.

=== Singles ===
Tournament	1997	1998	1999	2000	2001	2002	2003	2004	2005	2006	2007	2008	2009	2010	2011	2012	2013	2014	2015	2016	SR	W–L	Win%
Grand Slam tournaments
Australian Open	1R	1R	2R	4R	3R	1R	4R	4R	F	2R	3R	4R	1R	4R	1R	4R	1R	1R	2R	2R	0 / 20	32–20	62%
French Open	A	Q1	1R	4R	QF	4R	3R	QF	A	4R	4R	3R	3R	3R	A	1R	1R	1R	A	A	0 / 14	28–14	67%
Wimbledon	A	Q1	3R	1R	4R	W	1R	QF	SF	QF	4R	4R	QF	4R	2R	1R	2R	2R	1R	A	1 / 17	41–16	72%
US Open	A	Q2	3R	SF	W	SF	QF	F	SF	QF	2R	A	3R	1R	A	3R	4R	1R	2R	A	1 / 15	47–14	77%
Win–loss	0–1	0–1	5–4	11–4	16–3	15–3	9–4	17–4	16–3	12–4	9–4	8–3	8–4	8–4	1–2	5–4	4-4	1–4	2–3	1–1	2 / 66	148–64	70%
Year-end championship
World Tour Finals	did not qualify			RR	W	W	DNQ	F	A	did not qualify											2 / 4	13–5	72%
ATP World Tour Masters 1000
Indian Wells	A	1R	2R	2R	SF	W	W	3R	F	3R	2R	4R	2R	A	1R	A	3R	2R	A	A	2 / 15	33–13	72%
Miami	A	1R	2R	SF	SF	SF	2R	3R	A	2R	A	2R	2R	A	A	A	2R	2R	1R	A	0 / 13	17–13	57%
Monte Carlo	A	A	A	A	A	1R	A	3R	A	A	A	A	1R	A	A	A	A	A	A	A	0 / 3	2–3	40%
Rome	A	Q1	A	SF	3R	2R	A	2R	A	A	1R	A	A	2R	A	A	A	A	A	A	0 / 6	9–6	60%
Hamburg / Madrid^{1}	A	A	A	2R	SF	QF	3R	SF	A	A	SF	A	A	A	A	A	A	1R	A	A	0 / 7	18–7	72%
Canada	A	A	A	2R	2R	1R	2R	3R	1R	2R	QF	A	1R	A	A	A	A	1R	A	A	0 / 10	8–10	44%
Cincinnati	A	A	A	1R	SF	F	1R	F	SF	A	SF	A	QF	2R	A	2R	A	2R	A	A	0 / 11	28–11	72%
Stuttgart / Shanghai^{2}	A	A	1R	F	SF	A	A	A	A	A	A	A	2R	A	A	1R	1R	A	A	A	0 / 6	8–6	57%
Paris	A	A	3R	A	2R	F	A	QF	A	A	A	A	A	A	A	A	A	A	A	A	0 / 4	8–4	67%
Win–loss	0–0	0–2	4–4	15–7	22–8	23–7	9–4	18–8	8–3	2–3	10–5	2–2	6–6	2–2	0–1	1–2	3–3	3–5	0–1	0–0	2 / 75	128–73	64%
National representation
Summer Olympics	not held			1R	not held			A	not held			2R	not held			3R	not held			A	0 / 3	3–3	50%
Davis Cup	A	A	W	F	F	1R	W	1R	QF	SF	1R	PO	Z1	PO	PO	PO	PO	1R	SF	1R	2 / 12	42–14	75%
Win–loss	0–0	0–0	4–2	6–3	7–1	1–0	5–0	2–0	3–2	1–1	2–1	2–0	1–1	3–0	1–2	3–3	2–0	1–1	1–0	0–0	2 / 15	45–17	73%
Career statistics
	1997	1998	1999	2000	2001	2002	2003	2004	2005	2006	2007	2008	2009	2010	2011	2012	2013	2014	2015	2016	Career		
Tournaments	1	10	19	19	21	20	12	19	10	15	16	11	20	12	9	12	18	17	9	1	271		
Titles	0	1	1	4	6	5	2	4	1	1	1	0	1	1	0	0	0	2	0	0	30		
Finals	0	1	4	5	6	7	3	7	3	3	1	0	1	1	0	1	1	2	0	0	46		
Hardcourt W–L	0–1	7–6	22–10	37–11	50–10	33–9	26–6	45–9	28–6	21–11	21–9	12–8	19–15	5–6	6–6	9–7	14–12	11–9	3–5	1–1	20 / 174	370–157	70%
Clay W–L	0–0	0–0	6–5	11–5	14–5	10–5	8–2	13–6	0–0	3–3	12–5	2–1	9–3	8–5	0–0	0–3	1–3	1–5	0–1	0–0	2 / 45	98–57	63%
Grass W–L	0–0	1–2	10–3	8–2	16–2	14–0	3–2	8–2	9–3	9–1	3–2	6–2	6–2	8–1	3–5	7–4	9–3	8–2	1–3	0–0	8 / 45	129–41	76%
Carpet W–L	0–0	2–1	6–2	5–1	0–1	4–1	0–0	2–1	0–0	0–0	0–0	0–0	Discontinued								0 / 7	19–7	73%
Overall W–L	0–1	10–9	44–20	61–19	80–18	61–15	37–10	68–18	37–9	33–15	35–16	20–11	34–20	22–12	9–11	16–14	24–18	20–16	4–9	1–1	30 / 271	616–262	70%
Win %	0%	53%	69%	76%	82%	80%	79%	79%	80%	69%	69%	65%	63%	65%	45%	53%	57%	56%	31%	50%	70.16%		
Year-end ranking	550	100	25	7	1	1	17	3	4	20	21	67	22	54	186	83	60	50	307	633	$20,890,470		

^{1} Held as Hamburg Masters (outdoor clay) until 2008, Madrid Masters (outdoor clay) 2009 – present.
^{2} Held as Stuttgart Masters (indoor hard) until 2001, Madrid Masters (indoor hard) from 2002 to 2008, and Shanghai Masters (outdoor hard) 2009 – present.

=== Doubles ===
Tournament	1997	1998	1999	2000	2001	2002	2003	2004	2005	2006	2007	2008	2009	2010	2011	2012	2013	2014	2015	2016	2017	2018	2019	2020	2021	2022	SR	W–L	Win%
Grand Slam tournaments
Australian Open	A	3R	2R	3R	A	A	A	A	A	A	A	A	A	A	A	2R	A	1R	2R	3R	A	QF	1R	1R	A	A	0 / 10	12–10	55%
French Open	A	A	A	2R	A	A	A	A	A	1R	A	1R	A	A	A	A	A	1R	A	A	A	A	A	A	A	A	0 / 4	1–4	20%
Wimbledon	A	Q1	3R	A	A	A	A	A	A	A	A	A	A	A	1R	3R	1R	3R	3R	2R	A	1R	2R	NH	A	A	0 / 9	10–9	53%
US Open	A	A	A	W	A	A	A	A	A	A	A	A	A	A	A	A	A	A	2R	A	A	A	A	A	A	A	1 / 2	7–1	88%
Win–loss	0–0	2–1	3–2	9–2	0–0	0–0	0–0	0–0	0–0	0–1	0–0	0–1	0–0	0–0	0–1	3–2	0–1	2–3	4–3	3–2	0–0	3–2	1–2	0–1	0–0	0–0	1 / 25	30–24	56%
ATP Tour Masters 1000
Indian Wells	A	A	A	A	QF	A	A	A	A	A	A	A	A	A	A	A	A	A	A	A	A	A	A	NH	A	A	0 / 1	2–1	67%
Miami	A	A	A	A	SF	3R	1R	A	A	A	A	A	A	A	A	A	1R	A	A	A	A	A	A	NH	A	A	0 / 4	6–2	75%
Monte Carlo	A	A	A	A	A	A	A	A	A	A	A	A	A	A	A	A	A	A	A	A	A	A	A	NH	A	A	0 / 0	0–0	0%
Rome	A	1R	A	2R	QF	A	A	A	A	A	2R	A	A	A	A	A	A	A	A	A	A	A	A	A	A	A	0 / 4	4–4	50%
Hamburg / Madrid^{1}	A	A	A	SF	A	1R	A	A	A	A	A	A	A	A	A	A	A	A	A	A	A	A	A	NH	A	A	0 / 2	3–2	60%
Canada	A	A	A	A	1R	A	A	A	A	A	2R	A	A	A	A	A	A	A	1R	A	A	A	A	NH	A	A	0 / 3	1–2	33%
Cincinnati	A	A	A	QF	QF	2R	2R	A	A	A	A	A	A	A	A	A	A	A	A	A	A	A	A	A	A	A	0 / 4	5–2	71%
Stuttgart / Shanghai^{2}	A	A	A	2R	A	A	A	A	A	A	A	A	A	A	A	A	A	A	A	A	A	A	A	not held			0 / 1	0–1	0%
Paris	A	A	A	A	A	A	A	A	A	A	A	A	A	A	A	A	A	A	A	A	A	A	A	A	A	A	0 / 0	0–0	0%
Win–loss	0–0	0–1	0–0	6–4	9–3	3–2	1–1	0–0	0–0	0–0	2–1	0–0	0–0	0–0	0–0	0–0	0–1	0–0	0–1	0–0	0–0	0–0	0–0	0–0	0–0	0–0	0 / 19	21–14	60%
National representation
Summer Olympics	not held			A	not held			A	not held			QF	not held			A	not held			A	not held				A	NH	0 / 1	2–1	67%
Davis Cup	A	A	W	F	F	1R	W	1R	QF	SF	1R	PO	Z1	PO	PO	PO	PO	1R	SF	1R	A	PO	A	A		A	2 / 12	17–7	71%
Win–loss	0–0	0–0	0–0	0–0	1–1	1–0	1–0	0–0	0–1	0–0	1–1	4–1	0–0	2–0	2–0	2–0	2–0	1–1	1–2	0–1	0–0	1–0	0–0	0–0		0–0	2 / 13	19–8	70%
Career statistics
	1997	1998	1999	2000	2001	2002	2003	2004	2005	2006	2007	2008	2009	2010	2011	2012	2013	2014	2015	2016	2017	2018	2019	2020	2021	2022	Career		
Tournaments	0	5	8	12	6	8	5	1	2	1	4	5	2	4	3	4	7	10	9	2	0	7	7	2	0	0	114		
Titles	0	0	0	2	0	0	0	0	0	0	0	0	0	0	0	0	0	1	0	0	0	0	0	0	0	0	3		
Finals	0	0	0	2	0	0	1	0	0	0	0	0	0	1	0	0	1	1	0	0	0	0	0	0	0	0	6		
Overall win–loss	0–0	3–5	6–8	28–9	11–5	5–7	8–5	1–1	1–3	0–1	5–4	6–5	2–2	10–4	4–3	7–4	7–7	11–10	7–10	3–3	0–0	6–7	3–7	0–2	0–0	0–0	134–112		
Win %	–	38%	43%	76%	69%	42%	62%	50%	25%	0%	56%	55%	50%	71%	57%	64%	50%	52%	41%	50%	–	46%	30%	0%	0%	0%	54.47%		
Year-end ranking	408	164	185	20	105	219	168	572	846	1427	395	649	454	152	504	192	263	115	155	262	–	142	292	501	797	–			

^{1} Held as Hamburg Masters (outdoor clay) until 2008, Madrid Masters (outdoor clay) 2009 – present.
^{2} Held as Stuttgart Masters (indoor hard) until 2001, Madrid Masters (indoor hard) from 2002 to 2008, and Shanghai Masters (outdoor hard) 2009 – present.

== Significant finals ==
=== Grand Slam tournaments ===
==== Singles: 4 (2 titles, 2 runner-ups) ====
Result	Year	Championship	Surface	Opponent	Score
Win	2001	US Open	Hard	(United States) Pete Sampras	7–6^{(7–4)}, 6–1, 6–1
Win	2002	Wimbledon	Grass	(Argentina) David Nalbandian	6–1, 6–3, 6–2
Loss	2004	US Open	Hard	(Switzerland) Roger Federer	0–6, 6–7^{(3–7)}, 0–6
Loss	2005	Australian Open	Hard	(Russia) Marat Safin	6–1, 3–6, 4–6, 4–6

==== Doubles: 1 (1 title) ====
Result	Year	Championship	Surface	Partner	Opponent	Score
Win	2000	US Open	Hard	(Belarus) Max Mirnyi	(South Africa) Ellis Ferreira (United States) Rick Leach	6–4, 5–7, 7–6^{(7–5)}

==== Mixed doubles: 1 (1 runner-up) ====
Result	Year	Championship	Surface	Partner	Opponent	Score
Loss	2000	Wimbledon	Grass	(Belgium) Kim Clijsters	(United States) Kimberly Po (United States) Donald Johnson	4–6, 6–7^{(3–7)}

=== Year-end championship finals ===
==== Singles: 3 (2 titles, 1 runner-up) ====
Result	Year	Championship	Surface	Opponent	Score
Win	2001	Sydney	Hard (i)	(France) Sébastien Grosjean	6–3, 6–3, 6–4
Win	2002	Shanghai	Hard (i)	(Spain) Juan Carlos Ferrero	7–5, 7–5, 2–6, 2–6, 6–4
Loss	2004	Houston	Hard	(Switzerland) Roger Federer	3–6, 2–6

=== Masters 1000 finals ===
==== Singles: 7 (2 titles, 5 runner-ups) ====
Result	Year	Championship	Surface	Opponent	Score
Loss	2000	Stuttgart	Hard (i)	(South Africa) Wayne Ferreira	6–7^{(6–8)}, 6–3, 7–6^{(7–5)}, 6–7^{(2–7)}, 2–6
Win	2002	Indian Wells	Hard	(United Kingdom) Tim Henman	6–1, 6–2
Loss	2002	Cincinnati	Hard	(Spain) Carlos Moyá	5–7, 6–7^{(5–7)}
Loss	2002	Paris	Carpet (i)	(Russia) Marat Safin	6–7^{(4–7)}, 0–6, 4–6
Win	2003	Indian Wells (2)	Hard	(Brazil) Gustavo Kuerten	6–1, 6–1
Loss	2004	Cincinnati	Hard	(United States) Andre Agassi	3–6, 6–3, 2–6
Loss	2005	Indian Wells	Hard	(Switzerland) Roger Federer	2–6, 4–6, 4–6

== ATP career finals ==
=== Singles: 46 (30 titles, 16 runner-ups) ===
Legend Grand Slam Tournaments (2–2) ATP World Tour Finals (2–1) ATP World Tour Masters 1000 (2–5) ATP World Tour 500 Series (2–0) ATP World Tour 250 Series (22–8)	Finals by surface Hard (20–12) Clay (2–0) Grass (8–2) Carpet (0–2)

Result	W–L	Date	Tournament	Surface	Opponent	Score
Win	1–0	Jan 1998	Adelaide International, Australia	Hard	(Australia) Jason Stoltenberg	3–6, 6–3, 7–6^{(7–4)}
Loss	1–1	Jan 1999	Adelaide International, Australia	Hard	(Sweden) Thomas Enqvist	6–4, 1–6, 2–6
Loss	1–2	Mar 1999	Tennis Channel Open, United States	Hard	(United States) Jan-Michael Gambill	6–7^{(2–7)}, 6–4, 4–6
Win	2–2	May 1999	Delray Beach Open, United States	Clay	(Belgium) Xavier Malisse	6–4, 6–7^{(2–7)}, 6–1
Loss	2–3	Oct 1999	Open Sud de France, France	Carpet (i)	(Ecuador) Nicolás Lapentti	3–6, 2–6
Win	3–3	Jan 2000	Adelaide International, Australia (2)	Hard	(Sweden) Thomas Enqvist	3–6, 6–3, 6–2
Win	4–3	Jan 2000	Sydney International, Australia	Hard	(Australia) Jason Stoltenberg	6–4, 6–0
Win	5–3	Mar 2000	Tennis Channel Open, United States	Hard	(United Kingdom) Tim Henman	6–4, 7–6^{(7–2)}
Win	6–3	Jun 2000	Queen's Club Championships, United Kingdom	Grass	(United States) Pete Sampras	6–4, 6–4
Loss	6–4	Nov 2000	Stuttgart Masters, Germany	Hard (i)	(South Africa) Wayne Ferreira	6–7^{(6–8)}, 6–3, 7–6^{(7–5)}, 6–7^{(2–7)}, 2–6
Win	7–4	Jan 2001	Sydney International, Australia (2)	Hard	(Sweden) Magnus Norman	6–4, 6–1
Win	8–4	Jun 2001	Queen's Club Championships, United Kingdom (2)	Grass	(United Kingdom) Tim Henman	7–6^{(7–3)}, 7–6^{(7–3)}
Win	9–4	Jun 2001	Rosmalen Championships, Netherlands	Grass	(Argentina) Guillermo Cañas	6–3, 6–4
Win	10–4	Sep 2001	US Open, New York, United States	Hard	(United States) Pete Sampras	7–6^{(7–4)}, 6–1, 6–1
Win	11–4	Oct 2001	Japan Open, Japan	Hard	(Switzerland) Michel Kratochvil	6–4, 6–2
Win	12–4	Nov 2001	ATP Tour Finals, Sydney, Australia	Hard (i)	(France) Sébastien Grosjean	6–3, 6–3, 6–4
Win	13–4	Feb 2002	Pacific Coast Championships, United States	Hard (i)	(United States) Andre Agassi	4–6, 7–6^{(8–6)}, 7–6^{(7–4)}
Win	14–4	Mar 2002	Indian Wells Masters, United States	Hard	(United Kingdom) Tim Henman	6–1, 6–2
Win	15–4	Jun 2002	Queen's Club Championships, United Kingdom (3)	Grass	(United Kingdom) Tim Henman	4–6, 6–1, 6–4
Win	16–4	Jun 2002	Wimbledon, London, United Kingdom	Grass	(Argentina) David Nalbandian	6–1, 6–3, 6–2
Loss	16–5	Aug 2002	Cincinnati Masters, United States	Hard	(Spain) Carlos Moyà	5–7, 6–7^{(5–7)}
Loss	16–6	Nov 2002	Paris Masters, France	Carpet (i)	(Russia) Marat Safin	6–7^{(4–7)}, 0–6, 4–6
Win	17–6	Nov 2002	ATP Tour Finals, Shanghai, China (2)	Hard (i)	(Spain) Juan Carlos Ferrero	7–5, 7–5, 2–6, 2–6, 6–4
Win	18–6	Mar 2003	Tennis Channel Open, United States (2)	Hard	(Australia) Mark Philippoussis	6–4, 6–4
Win	19–6	Mar 2003	Indian Wells Masters, United States (2)	Hard	(Brazil) Gustavo Kuerten	6–1, 6–1
Loss	19–7	Aug 2003	Los Angeles Open, United States	Hard	(South Africa) Wayne Ferreira	3–6, 6–4, 5–7
Win	20–7	Jan 2004	Sydney International, Australia (3)	Hard	(Spain) Carlos Moyà	4–3 retired
Win	21–7	Feb 2004	Rotterdam Open, Netherlands	Hard (i)	(Spain) Juan Carlos Ferrero	6–7^{(1–7)}, 7–5, 6–4
Loss	21–8	Aug 2004	Cincinnati Masters, United States (2)	Hard	(United States) Andre Agassi	3–6, 6–3, 2–6
Win	22–8	Aug 2004	Washington Open, United States	Hard	(Luxembourg) Gilles Müller	6–3, 6–4
Win	23–8	Aug 2004	Connecticut Open, United States	Hard	(Peru) Luis Horna	6–3, 6–1
Loss	23–9	Sep 2004	US Open, New York, United States	Hard	(Switzerland) Roger Federer	0–6, 6–7^{(3–7)}, 0–6
Loss	23–10	Nov 2004	ATP Tour Finals, Houston, United States	Hard	(Switzerland) Roger Federer	3–6, 2–6
Win	24–10	Jan 2005	Sydney International, Australia (4)	Hard	(Czech Republic) Ivo Minář	7–5, 6–0
Loss	24–11	Jan 2005	Australian Open, Melbourne, Australia	Hard	(Russia) Marat Safin	6–1, 3–6, 4–6, 4–6
Loss	24–12	Mar 2005	Indian Wells Masters, United States	Hard	(Switzerland) Roger Federer	2–6, 4–6, 4–6
Loss	24–13	Feb 2006	Pacific Coast Championships, United States	Hard (i)	(United Kingdom) Andy Murray	6–2, 1–6, 6–7^{(3–7)}
Loss	24–14	Mar 2006	Tennis Channel Open, United States	Hard	(United States) James Blake	5–7, 6–2, 3–6
Win	25–14	Jun 2006	Queen's Club Championships, United Kingdom (4)	Grass	(United States) James Blake	6–4, 6–4
Win	26–14	Mar 2007	Tennis Channel Open, United States (3)	Hard	(Austria) Jürgen Melzer	6–4, 7–6^{(12–10)}
Win	27–14	Apr 2009	US Clay Court Championships, United States	Clay	(United States) Wayne Odesnik	6–2, 7–5
Win	28–14	Jun 2010	Halle Open, Germany	Grass	(Switzerland) Roger Federer	3–6, 7–6^{(7–4)}, 6–4
Loss	28–15	Jul 2012	Hall of Fame Open, United States	Grass	(United States) John Isner	6–7^{(1–7)}, 4–6
Loss	28–16	Jul 2013	Hall of Fame Open, United States	Grass	(France) Nicolas Mahut	7–5, 5–7, 3–6
Win	29–16	Jan 2014	Brisbane International, Australia	Hard	(Switzerland) Roger Federer	6–1, 4–6, 6–3
Win	30–16	Jul 2014	Hall of Fame Open, United States	Grass	(Croatia) Ivo Karlović	6–3, 6–7^{(4–7)}, 7–6^{(7–3)}

=== Doubles: 8 (3 titles, 5 runner-ups) ===
Legend Grand Slam Tournaments (1–0) ATP World Tour Finals (0–0) ATP World Tour Masters 1000 (0–0) ATP World Tour 500 Series (1–1) ATP World Tour 250 Series (1–4)	Finals by surface Hard (2–4) Clay (0–1) Grass (1–0) Carpet (0–0)

Result	W–L	Date	Tournament	Surface	Partner	Opponents	Score
Loss	0–1	Jan 2000	Adelaide International, Australia	Hard	(Australia) Sandon Stolle	(Australia) Todd Woodbridge (Australia) Mark Woodforde	4–6, 2–6
Loss	0–2	Jan 2000	Sydney International, Australia	Hard	(Australia) Sandon Stolle	(Australia) Todd Woodbridge (Australia) Mark Woodforde	5–7, 4–6
Win	1–2	Aug 2000	Indianapolis Championships, United States	Hard	(Australia) Sandon Stolle	(Sweden) Jonas Björkman (Belarus) Max Mirnyi	6–2, 3–6, 6–3
Win	2–2	Sep 2000	US Open, New York, United States	Hard	(Belarus) Max Mirnyi	(South Africa) Ellis Ferreira (United States) Rick Leach	6–4, 5–7, 7–6^{(7–5)}
Loss	2–3	Mar 2003	Tennis Channel Open, United States	Hard	(Australia) Mark Philippoussis	(United States) James Blake (The Bahamas) Mark Merklein	4–6, 7–6^{(7–2)}, 6–7^{(5–7)}
Loss	2–4	Apr 2010	Barcelona Open, Spain	Clay	(The Bahamas) Mark Knowles	(Canada) Daniel Nestor (Serbia) Nenad Zimonjić	6–4, 3–6, [6–10]
Loss	2–5	Feb 2013	Pacific Coast Championships, United States	Hard (i)	(Australia) Marinko Matosevic	(Belgium) Xavier Malisse (Germany) Frank Moser	0–6, 7–6^{(7–5)}, [4–10]
Win	3–5	Jul 2014	Hall of Fame Open, United States	Grass	(Australia) Chris Guccione	(Israel) Jonathan Erlich (United States) Rajeev Ram	7–5, 6–4

== ATP Challenger finals ==
=== Singles: 1 (1–0) ===
Result	W–L	Date	Tournament	Surface	Opponent	Score
Win	1–0	Dec 1998	Perth, Australia	Hard	(Australia) Mark Draper	6–4, 6–4

=== Doubles: 3 (2–1) ===
Result	W–L	Date	Tournament	Surface	Partner	Opponents	Score
Loss	0–1	Dec 1997	Perth, Australia	Hard	(Australia) Luke Smith	(Australia) Jamie Holmes (Australia) Paul Kilderry	1–6, 6–3, 6–7
Win	1–1	Aug 1998	Lexington, United States	Hard	(Australia) Ben Ellwood	(United States) Paul Goldstein (United States) Jim Thomas	5–7, 6–3, 6–2
Win	2–1	Dec 1998	Perth, Australia	Hard	(Australia) Paul Kilderry	(Australia) Dejan Petrović (Australia) Grant Silcock	6–7, 6–3, 7–6

== ATP Tour career earnings ==
Year	Majors Singles	ATP wins Singles	Majors Doubles	ATP wins Doubles	Total wins	Earnings ($)	Money list rank
1997	0	0	0	0	0	$7,919
1998	0	1	0	0	1	$135,535
1999	0	1	0	0	1	$411,771	54
2000	0	4	1	1	6	$1,642,572	8
2001	1	5	0	0	6	$3,770,618	1
2002	1	4	0	0	5	$4,619,386	1
2003	0	2	0	0	2	$873,598	15
2004	0	4	0	0	4	$2,766,051	2
2005	0	1	0	0	1	$1,459,437	8
2006	0	1	0	0	1	$646,680	27
2007	0	1	0	0	1	$662,075	30
2008	0	0	0	0	0	$357,876	86
2009	0	1	0	0	1	$682,947	35
2010	0	1	0	0	1	$531,666	59
2011	0	0	0	0	0	$160,743	156
2012	0	0	0	0	0	$365,620	87
2013	0	0	0	0	0	$548,854	63
2014	0	2	0	1	3	$533,952	71
2015	0	0	0	0	0	$264,280
2016	0	0	0	0	0	$70,429
2017	0	0	0	0	0	$0
2018	0	0	0	0	0	$61,414
2019	0	0	0	0	0	$30,935	362
2020	0	0	0	0	0	$10,031	408
2021	0	0	0	0	0	$0	n/a
2022	0	0	0	0	0	$0	n/a
2025	0	0	0	0	0	$505	2912
Career	2	28	1	2	33	$20,890,470	32

* Statistics correct as of 22 December 2025.

== Head-to-head record vs. top-10 ranked players ==
Hewitt's record against players who held a top 10 ranking, with those who reached No. 1 in bold

- (United Kingdom) Tim Henman 9–1
- (Switzerland) **Roger Federer** 9–18
- (United States) James Blake 8–1
- (Sweden) Jonas Björkman 7–0
- (Austria) Jürgen Melzer 7–0
- (France) Arnaud Clément 7–1
- (Russia) **Yevgeny Kafelnikov** 7–1
- (Germany) Tommy Haas 7–4
- (Spain) **Carlos Moyá** 7–5
- (United States) **Andy Roddick** 7–7
- (Russia) **Marat Safin** 7–7
- (Spain) Albert Costa 6–1
- (Sweden) Thomas Enqvist 6–1
- (Czech Republic) Jiří Novák 6–1
- (Argentina) Guillermo Cañas 6–2
- (France) Sébastien Grosjean 6–3
- (Spain) **Juan Carlos Ferrero** 6–4
- (Sweden) Thomas Johansson 5–1
- (Thailand) Paradorn Srichaphan 5–1
- (Russia) Mikhail Youzhny 5–2
- (United States) **Pete Sampras** 5–4
- (Russia) Nikolay Davydenko 4–0
- (United States) John Isner 4–2
- (Sweden) Magnus Norman 4–2
- (Argentina) Gastón Gaudio 4–3
- (United Kingdom) Greg Rusedski 4–3
- (United States) **Andre Agassi** 4–4
- (Spain) **Rafael Nadal** 4–7
- (Croatia) Goran Ivanišević 3–0
- (Germany) Nicolas Kiefer 3–0
- (Brazil) **Gustavo Kuerten** 3–1
- (United States) Todd Martin 3–1
- (Australia) Mark Philippoussis 3–1
- (Australia) **Patrick Rafter** 3–1
- (Czech Republic) Radek Štěpánek 3–1
- (Cyprus) Marcos Baghdatis 3–2
- (Argentina) Juan Martín del Potro 3–2
- (South Africa) Wayne Ferreira 3–2
- (France) Cédric Pioline 3–2
- (Chile) **Marcelo Ríos** 3–2
- (Sweden) Robin Söderling 3–2
- (Serbia) Janko Tipsarević 3–2
- (Spain) Àlex Corretja 3–3
- (Argentina) David Nalbandian 3–3
- (United States) Michael Chang 2–0
- (Argentina) Guillermo Coria 2–0
- (France) Richard Gasquet 2–0
- (Sweden) Magnus Gustafsson 2–0
- (Chile) Nicolás Massú 2–0
- (Japan) Kei Nishikori 2–0
- (Slovakia) Karol Kučera 2–1
- (United States) Mardy Fish 2–2
- (Ecuador) Nicolás Lapentti 2–2
- (France) Gaël Monfils 2–2
- (Switzerland) Stan Wawrinka 2–2
- (Germany) Rainer Schüttler 2–3
- (Chile) Fernando González 2–5
- (Croatia) Mario Ančić 1–0
- (Bulgaria) Grigor Dimitrov 1–0
- (Netherlands) Richard Krajicek 1–0
- (Sweden) Magnus Larsson 1–0
- (Croatia) Ivan Ljubičić 1–0
- (Argentina) Juan Mónaco 1–0
- (Argentina) Mariano Puerta 1–0
- (Switzerland) Marc Rosset 1–0
- (United States) Jack Sock 1–0
- (Croatia) Marin Čilić 1–1
- (Sweden) Joachim Johansson 1–1
- (Canada) Milos Raonic 1–1
- (Spain) Tommy Robredo 1–1
- (Spain) Nicolás Almagro 1–2
- (South Africa) Kevin Anderson 1–2
- (Spain) David Ferrer 1–3
- (Serbia) **Novak Djokovic** 1–6
- (Germany) **Boris Becker** 0–1
- (Spain) Sergi Bruguera 0–1
- (Spain) Félix Mantilla 0–1
- (Ukraine) Andriy Medvedev 0–1
- (United Kingdom) **Andy Murray** 0–1
- (Italy) Fabio Fognini 0–2
- (Czech Republic) Tomáš Berdych 0–3
- (France) Gilles Simon 0–4
- (France) Jo-Wilfried Tsonga 0–4

== Top-10 wins per season ==
Hewitt has a 65–73 (47.1%) record against players who were, at the time the match was played, ranked in the top 10.

Year	1998	1999	2000	2001	2002	2003	2004	2005	2006	2007	2008	2009	2010	2011	2012	2013	2014	2015	2016	Total
Wins	1	6	11	13	9	3	8	4	2	1	0	1	1	0	1	3	1	0	0	65

#	Player	Rank	Event	Surface	Rd	Score
1998
1.	(Sweden) Jonas Björkman	4	Sydney, Australia	Hard	1R	6–3, 6–7^{(4–7)}, 6–4
1999
2.	(Australia) Patrick Rafter	4	Sydney, Australia	Hard	1R	7–6^{(7–1)}, 6–1
3.	(Australia) Patrick Rafter	5	Scottsdale, United States	Hard	2R	7–6^{(7–5)}, 6–1
4.	(Australia) Mark Philippoussis	10	Queen's Club, London, England	Grass	3R	6–7^{(4–7)}, 6–3, 6–2
5.	(United States) Todd Martin	8	Davis Cup, Boston, United States	Hard	RR	6–4, 6–7^{(1–7)}, 6–3, 6–0
6.	(Russia) Yevgeny Kafelnikov	2	Davis Cup, Brisbane, Australia	Grass	RR	6–4, 7–5, 6–2
7.	(Russia) Yevgeny Kafelnikov	2	Paris, France	Carpet (i)	2R	6–4, 2–6, 6–4
2000
8.	(Sweden) Thomas Enqvist	4	Adelaide, Australia	Hard	F	3–6, 6–3, 6–2
9.	(Chile) Marcelo Ríos	7	Scottsdale, United States	Hard	QF	7–6^{(7–5)}, 4–2 ret.
10.	(Russia) Yevgeny Kafelnikov	3	Miami, United States	Hard	4R	6–4, 6–3
11.	(Sweden) Thomas Enqvist	9	Rome, Italy	Clay	3R	7–6^{(8–6)}, 2–6, 6–3
12.	(France) Cédric Pioline	6	Queen's Club, London, England	Grass	QF	6–4, 6–4
13.	(United States) Pete Sampras	4	Queen's Club, London, England	Grass	F	6–4, 6–4
14.	(Sweden) Thomas Enqvist	6	Indianapolis, United States	Hard	QF	6–3, 6–3
15.	(Sweden) Thomas Enqvist	5	US Open, New York, United States	Hard	4R	6–3, 6–2, 6–4
16.	(United Kingdom) Tim Henman	10	Stuttgart, Germany	Hard (i)	3R	3–6, 6–3, 6–4
17.	(Russia) Yevgeny Kafelnikov	5	Stuttgart, Germany	Hard (i)	SF	6–4, 6–7^{(5–7)}, 6–3
18.	(United States) Pete Sampras	3	Tennis Masters Cup, Lisbon, Portugal	Hard (i)	RR	7–5, 6–0
2001
19.	(Sweden) Magnus Norman	4	Sydney, Australia	Hard	F	6–4, 6–1
20.	(Brazil) Gustavo Kuerten	2	Davis Cup, Florianopolis, Brazil	Clay	RR	7–6^{(7–5)}, 6–3, 7–6^{(7–3)}
21.	(Sweden) Magnus Norman	9	World Team Cup, Düsseldorf, Germany	Clay	RR	6–1, 6–2
22.	(Russia) Marat Safin	2	World Team Cup, Düsseldorf, Germany	Clay	F	6–3, 6–4
23.	(United States) Pete Sampras	4	Queen's Club, London, England	Grass	SF	3–6, 6–3, 6–2
24.	(Russia) Yevgeny Kafelnikov	7	US Open, New York, United States	Hard	SF	6–1, 6–2, 6–1
25.	(United States) Pete Sampras	10	US Open, New York, United States	Hard	F	7–6^{(7–4)}, 6–1, 6–1
26.	(France) Sébastien Grosjean	7	Tennis Masters Cup, Sydney, Australia	Hard (i)	RR	3–6, 6–2, 6–3
27.	(United States) Andre Agassi	3	Tennis Masters Cup, Sydney, Australia	Hard (i)	RR	6–3, 6–4
28.	(Australia) Patrick Rafter	5	Tennis Masters Cup, Sydney, Australia	Hard (i)	RR	7–5, 6–2
29.	(Spain) Juan Carlos Ferrero	4	Tennis Masters Cup, Sydney, Australia	Hard (i)	SF	6–4, 6–3
30.	(France) Sébastien Grosjean	7	Tennis Masters Cup, Sydney, Australia	Hard (i)	F	6–3, 6–3, 6–4
31.	(France) Sébastien Grosjean	6	Davis Cup, Melbourne, Australia	Grass	RR	6–3, 6–2, 6–3
2002
32.	(United States) Andre Agassi	5	San Jose	Hard	F	4–6, 7–6^{(8–6)}, 7–6^{(7–4)}
33.	(Russia) Marat Safin	7	Miami, United States	Hard	QF	2–6, 6–2, 7–6^{(7–4)}
34.	(United Kingdom) Tim Henman	5	Queen's Club, London, England	Grass	F	4–6, 6–1, 6–4
35.	(United Kingdom) Tim Henman	5	Wimbledon, London, England	Grass	SF	7–5, 6–1, 7–5
36.	(United States) Andre Agassi	6	Cincinnati, United States	Hard	QF	7–5, 6–3
37.	(Switzerland) Roger Federer	8	Paris, France	Carpet (i)	QF	6–4, 6–4
38.	(Russia) Marat Safin	3	Tennis Masters Cup, Shanghai, China	Hard (i)	RR	6–4, 2–6, 6–4
39.	(Switzerland) Roger Federer	6	Tennis Masters Cup, Shanghai, China	Hard (i)	SF	7–5, 5–7, 7–5
40.	(Spain) Juan Carlos Ferrero	4	Tennis Masters Cup, Shanghai, China	Hard (i)	F	7–5, 7–5, 2–6, 2–6, 6–4
2003
41.	(Spain) Carlos Moyá	4	World Team Cup, Düsseldorf, Germany	Clay	RR	6–2, 3–6, 6–3
42.	(Switzerland) Roger Federer	3	Davis Cup, Melbourne, Australia	Hard	RR	5–7, 2–6, 7–6^{(7–4)}, 7–5, 6–1
43.	(Spain) Juan Carlos Ferrero	3	Davis Cup, Melbourne, Australia	Hard	RR	3–6, 6–3, 3–6, 7–6^{(7–0)}, 6–2
2004
44.	(Spain) Carlos Moyá	7	Sydney, Australia	Hard	F	4–3, ret.
45.	(Germany) Rainer Schüttler	6	Rotterdam, Netherlands	Hard (i)	QF	7–6^{(7–5)}, 6–3
46.	(Spain) Juan Carlos Ferrero	3	Rotterdam, Netherlands	Hard (i)	QF	6–7^{(1–7)}, 7–5, 6–4
47.	(Spain) Carlos Moyá	7	Wimbledon, London, England	Grass	4R	6–4, 6–2, 4–6, 7–6^{(7–3)}
48.	(United Kingdom) Tim Henman	6	Cincinnati, United States	Hard	QF	6–1, 6–4
49.	(Spain) Carlos Moyá	5	Tennis Masters Cup, Houston, USA	Hard	RR	6–7^{(5–7)}, 6–2, 6–4
50.	(Argentina) Gastón Gaudio	10	Tennis Masters Cup, Houston, USA	Hard	RR	6–2, 6–1
51.	(United States) Andy Roddick	2	Tennis Masters Cup, Houston, USA	Hard	SF	6–3, 6–2
2005
52.	(Argentina) David Nalbandian	9	Australian Open, Melbourne, Australia	Hard	QF	6–3, 6–2, 1–6, 3–6, 10–8
53.	(United States) Andy Roddick	2	Australian Open, Melbourne, Australia	Hard	SF	3–6, 7–6^{(7–3)}, 7–6^{(7–4)}, 6–1
54.	(United States) Andy Roddick	3	Indian Wells, United States	Hard	SF	7–6^{(7–2)}, 6–7^{(3–7)}, 7–6^{(7–4)}
55.	(Russia) Nikolay Davydenko	7	Cincinnati, United States	Hard	QF	6–2, 6–3
2006
56.	(Spain) Rafael Nadal	2	Queen's Club, London, England	Grass	QF	3–6, 6–3, ret.
57.	(United States) James Blake	7	Queen's Club, London, England	Grass	F	6–4, 6–4
2007
58.	(Russia) Nikolay Davydenko	3	Hamburg, Germany	Clay	3R	6–4, 2–6, 6–4
2009
59.	(Argentina) Juan Martín del Potro	5	Wimbledon, London, England	Grass	2R	6–3, 7–5, 7–5
2010
60.	(Switzerland) Roger Federer	2	Halle, Germany	Grass	F	3–6, 7–6^{(7–4)}, 6–4
2012
61.	(Argentina) Juan Mónaco	10	Valencia, Spain	Hard (i)	1R	6–3, 6–4
2013
62.	(Argentina) Juan Martín del Potro	8	Queen's Club, London, England	Grass	QF	6–2, 2–6, 6–2
63.	(Switzerland) Stanislas Wawrinka	10	Wimbledon, London, England	Grass	1R	6–4, 7–5, 6–3
64.	(Argentina) Juan Martín del Potro	6	US Open, New York, United States	Hard	2R	6–4, 5–7, 3–6, 7–6^{(7–2)}, 6–1
2014
65.	(Switzerland) Roger Federer	6	Brisbane, Australia	Hard	F	6–1, 4–6, 6–3

== National representation ==
=== Team competition finals: 7 (3 titles, 4 runner-ups) ===
Finals by tournaments Olympic Games (0–0) Davis Cup (2–2) World Team Cup (1–1) Hopman Cup (0–1)	Finals by continent category Intercontinental (3–4) Continental (0–0)	Finals by surface Hard (0–1) Grass (1–1) Clay (2–2)	Finals by setting Outdoors (2–3) Indoors (1–1)

Outcome	No.	Date	Tournament	Surface	Partner	Opponents	Score
Win	1.	Dec 1999	Davis Cup, Nice, France	Clay (i)	(Australia) Mark Philippoussis (Australia) Todd Woodbridge (Australia) Mark Woodforde	(France) Sébastien Grosjean (France) Fabrice Santoro (France) Cédric Pioline (France) Olivier Delaître	3–2
Loss	1.	Dec 2000	Davis Cup, Barcelona, Spain	Clay (i)	(Australia) Patrick Rafter (Australia) Sandon Stolle (Australia) Mark Woodforde	(Spain) Juan Carlos Ferrero (Spain) Albert Costa (Spain) Àlex Corretja (Spain) Joan Balcells	1–3
Win	2.	May 2001	World Team Cup, Düsseldorf, Germany	Clay	(Australia) Scott Draper (Australia) Wayne Arthurs	(Russia) Marat Safin (Russia) Yevgeny Kafelnikov	2–1
Loss	2.	Dec 2001	Davis Cup, Melbourne, Australia	Grass	(Australia) Patrick Rafter (Australia) Wayne Arthurs (Australia) Todd Woodbridge	(France) Sébastien Grosjean (France) Fabrice Santoro (France) Cédric Pioline (France) Nicolas Escudé	2–3
Loss	3.	Jan 2003	Hopman Cup, Perth, Australia	Hard	(Australia) Alicia Molik	(United States) Serena Williams (United States) James Blake	0–3
Win	3.	Nov 2003	Davis Cup, Melbourne, Australia	Grass	(Australia) Mark Philippoussis (Australia) Wayne Arthurs (Australia) Todd Woodbridge	(Spain) Juan Carlos Ferrero (Spain) Carlos Moyá (Spain) Àlex Corretja (Spain) Feliciano López	3–1
Loss	4.	May 2004	World Team Cup, Düsseldorf, Germany	Clay	(Australia) Scott Draper (Australia) Wayne Arthurs	(Chile) Fernando González (Chile) Nicolás Massú (Chile) Adrián García	1–2

=== Davis Cup (59–21) ===
Group membership World Group (32–15) WG Play-offs (12–5) Group I (15–1)	Matches by surface Hard (22–3) Clay (16–10) Grass (19–8) Carpet (2–0)	Matches by type Singles (42–14) Doubles (17–7)	Matches by setting Indoors (13–9) Outdoors (46–12)	Matches by venue Australia (36–8) Away (23–13)

Rd	Date	Opponent nation	Score	Venue	Surface	Match	Opponent player(s)	Rubber score
1999
QF	Jul 1999	United States	4–1	Chestnut Hill	Hard	Singles 1	Todd Martin	6–4, 6–7^{(1–7)}, 6–3, 6–0
QF	Jul 1999	United States	4–1	Chestnut Hill	Hard	Singles 5 (dead)	Alex O'Brien	7–5, 6–4
SF	Sep 1999	Russia	4–1	Brisbane	Grass	Singles 1	Marat Safin	7–6^{(7–0)}, 6–2, 4–6, 6–3
SF	Sep 1999	Russia	4–1	Brisbane	Grass	Singles 4	Yevgeny Kafelnikov	6–4, 7–5, 6–2
F	Dec 1999	France	3–2	Nice	Clay (i)	Singles 2	Cédric Pioline	6–7^{(7–9)}, 6–7^{(6–8)}, 5–7
F	Dec 1999	France	3–2	Nice	Clay (i)	Singles 5 (dead)	Sébastien Grosjean	4–6, 3–6
2000
1R	Feb 2000	Switzerland	3–2	Zürich	Carpet (i)	Singles 1	George Bastl	4–6, 6–3, 6–2, 6–4
1R	Feb 2000	Switzerland	3–2	Zürich	Carpet (i)	Singles 4	Roger Federer	6–2, 3–6, 7–6^{(7–2)}, 6–1
QF	Apr 2000	Germany	3–2	Adelaide	Grass	Singles 1	Michael Kohlmann	6–1, 6–1, 6–2
QF	Apr 2000	Germany	3–2	Adelaide	Grass	Singles 4 (dead)	Rainer Schüttler	6–2, 3–6, 4–6
SF	Jul 2000	Brazil	5–0	Brisbane	Grass	Singles 2	Fernando Meligeni	6–4, 6–2, 6–3
SF	Jul 2000	Brazil	5–0	Brisbane	Grass	Singles 4 (dead)	André Sá	6–4, 6–1
F	Dec 2000	Spain	1–3	Barcelona	Clay (i)	Singles 1	Albert Costa	3–6, 6–1, 2–6, 6–4, 6–4
F	Dec 2000	Spain	1–3	Barcelona	Clay (i)	Singles 4	Juan Carlos Ferrero	2–6, 6–7^{(5–7)}, 6–4, 4–6
2001
1R	Feb 2001	Ecuador	4–1	Perth	Grass	Singles 2	Giovanni Lapentti	6–3, 6–2, 6–2
1R	Feb 2001	Ecuador	4–1	Perth	Grass	Singles 4	Nicolás Lapentti	6–2, 6–1, 6–1
QF	Apr 2001	Brazil	3–1	Florianópolis	Clay	Singles 2	Fernando Meligeni	6–3, 6–3, 6–3
QF	Apr 2001	Brazil	3–1	Florianópolis	Clay	Doubles (w/ Rafter)	Kuerten / Oncins	7–6^{(9–7)}, 7–6^{(7–3)}, 7–6^{(7–5)}
QF	Apr 2001	Brazil	3–1	Florianópolis	Clay	Singles 4	Gustavo Kuerten	7–6^{(7–5)}, 6–3, 7–6^{(7–3)}
SF	Sep 2001	Sweden	4–1	Sydney	Hard	Singles 2	Jonas Björkman	4–6, 6–4, 7–6^{(7–5)}, 7–6^{(7–2)}
SF	Sep 2001	Sweden	4–1	Sydney	Hard	Singles 4	Thomas Johansson	7–6^{(7–3)}, 5–7, 6–2, 6–1
F	Dec 2001	France	2–3	Melbourne	Grass	Singles 1	Nicolas Escudé	6–4, 3–6, 6–3, 3–6, 4–6
F	Dec 2001	France	2–3	Melbourne	Grass	Doubles (w/ Rafter)	Pioline / Santoro	6–2, 3–6, 6–7^{(5–7)}, 1–6
F	Dec 2001	France	2–3	Melbourne	Grass	Singles 4	Sébastien Grosjean	6–3, 6–2, 6–3
2002
Q1	Sep 2002	India	5–0	Adelaide	Hard	Singles 1	Harsh Mankad	6–1, 7–6^{(7–2)}, 6–1
Q1	Sep 2002	India	5–0	Adelaide	Hard	Doubles (w/ Woodbridge)	Paes / Uppal	6–3, 7–6^{(7–5)}, 6–1
2003
1R	Feb 2003	Great Britain	4–1	Sydney	Clay	Singles 2	Alex Bogdanovic	7–5, 6–1, 6–2
1R	Feb 2003	Great Britain	4–1	Sydney	Clay	Doubles (w/ Woodbridge)	Maclagan / Parmar	6–1, 6–3, 4–6, 6–2
QF	Apr 2003	Sweden	5–0	Malmö	Hard (i)	Singles 2	Thomas Enqvist	6–4, 6–2, 5–7, 6–4
SF	Sep 2003	Switzerland	3–2	Melbourne	Hard	Singles 1	Michel Kratochvil	6–4, 6–4, 6–1
SF	Sep 2003	Switzerland	3–2	Melbourne	Hard	Singles 4	Roger Federer	5–7, 2–6, 7–6^{(7–4)}, 7–5, 6–1
F	Nov 2003	Spain	3–1	Melbourne	Grass	Singles 1	Juan Carlos Ferrero	3–6, 6–3, 3–6, 7–6^{(7–0)}, 6–2
2004
1R	Feb 2004	Sweden	1–4	Adelaide	Hard	Singles 2	Robin Söderling	6–4, 6–3, 6–1
PO	Sep 2004	Morocco	4–1	West Perth	Grass	Singles 2	Mehdi Tahiri	6–0, 6–2, 6–2
2005
1R	Mar 2005	Austria	5–0	Sydney	Grass	Singles 1	Alexander Peya	6–2, 6–3, 6–4
QF	Jul 2005	Argentina	1–4	Sydney	Grass	Singles 1	Guillermo Coria	7–6^{(7–5)}, 6–1, 1–6, 6–2
QF	Jul 2005	Argentina	1–4	Sydney	Grass	Doubles (w/ Arthurs)	Nalbandian / Puerta	6–7^{(6–8)}, 4–6, 3–6
QF	Jul 2005	Argentina	1–4	Sydney	Grass	Singles 4	David Nalbandian	2–6, 4–6, 4–6
2006
QF	Apr 2006	Belarus	5–0	Melbourne	Hard	Singles 2	Vladimir Voltchkov	6–2, 6–1, 6–2
SF	Sep 2006	Argentina	0–5	Buenos Aires	Clay	Singles 2	José Acasuso	6–1, 4–6, 6–4, 2–6, 1–6
2007
1R	Feb 2007	Belgium	2–3	Liège	Clay (i)	Singles 1	Kristof Vliegen	6–4, 4–6, 6–3, 3–6, 4–6
1R	Feb 2007	Belgium	2–3	Liège	Clay (i)	Doubles (w/ Hanley)	Rochus / Vliegen	6–2, 6–4, 6–2
1R	Feb 2007	Belgium	2–3	Liège	Clay (i)	Singles 4	Olivier Rochus	6–2, 6–3, 6–7^{(4–7)}, 3–6, 6–1
PO	Sep 2007	Serbia	1–4	Belgrade	Clay (i)	Singles 2	Janko Tipsarević	6–2, 3–6, 4–6, 6–1, 6–1
PO	Sep 2007	Serbia	1–4	Belgrade	Clay (i)	Doubles (w/ Hanley)	Djokovic / Zimonjić	6–3, 4–6, 3–6, 2–6
2008
GI 1R	Feb 2008	Chinese Taipei	4–1	Kaohsiung	Hard	Singles 1	Chen Ti	6–4, 6–0, 6–3
GI 1R	Feb 2008	Chinese Taipei	4–1	Kaohsiung	Hard	Doubles (w/ Hanley)	Lu / Wang	2–6, 6–7^{(4–7)}, 6–4, 6–2, 6–2
GI 2R	Apr 2008	Thailand	5–0	Townsville	Hard (i)	Singles 2	Kirati Siributwong	6–0, 6–0, 6–1
GI 2R	Apr 2008	Thailand	5–0	Townsville	Hard (i)	Doubles (w/ Hanley)	Doakmaiklee / Siributwong	6–3, 6–1, 6–0
2009
GI 2R	Mar 2009	Thailand	3–2	Nonthaburi	Hard	Singles 1	Kittipong Wachiramanowong	6–3, 6–2, 6–1
GI 2R	Mar 2009	Thailand	3–2	Nonthaburi	Hard	Singles 4	Danai Udomchoke	6–2, 6–4, 6–7^{(2–7)}, 4–6, 1–6
2010
GI 2R	May 2010	Japan	5–0	Brisbane	Clay	Singles 1	Tatsuma Ito	6–3, 6–3, 6–2
GI 2R	May 2010	Japan	5–0	Brisbane	Clay	Doubles (w/ Hanley)	Soeda / Suzuki	7–5, 6–4, 6–0
GI 2R	May 2010	Japan	5–0	Brisbane	Clay	Singles 4 (dead)	Yūichi Sugita	7–5, 6–2
PO	Sep 2010	Belgium	2–3	Cairns	Hard	Singles 1	Ruben Bemelmans	7–6^{(7–4)}, 7–5, 2–6, 6–4
PO	Sep 2010	Belgium	2–3	Cairns	Hard	Doubles (w/ Hanley)	Bemelmans / Rochus	6–1, 6–2, 6–4
2011
GI 2R	Jul 2011	China	3–1	Beijing	Hard (i)	Doubles (w/ Guccione)	Gong / Li	6–4, 6–4, 6–4
GI 2R	Jul 2011	China	3–1	Beijing	Hard (i)	Singles 4	Zhang Ze	6–2, 6–2, 4–6, 7–6^{(7–2)}
PO	Sep 2011	Switzerland	2–3	Sydney	Grass	Singles 2	Roger Federer	7–5, 6–7^{(5–7)}, 2–6, 3–6
PO	Sep 2011	Switzerland	2–3	Sydney	Grass	Doubles (w/ Guccione)	Federer / Wawrinka	2–6, 6–4, 6–2, 7–6^{(7–5)}
PO	Sep 2011	Switzerland	2–3	Sydney	Grass	Singles 5 (decider)	Stan Wawrinka	6–4, 4–6, 7–6^{(9–7)}, 4–6, 3–6
2012
GI 1R	Feb 2012	China	5–0	Geelong	Grass	Singles 1	Zhang Ze	6–2, 6–1, 7–6^{(7–4)}
GI 1R	Feb 2012	China	5–0	Geelong	Grass	Doubles (w/ Guccione)	Li / Zhang	6–2, 6–2, 6–2
PO	Sep 2012	Germany	2–3	Hamburg	Clay	Singles 2	Florian Mayer	5–7, 3–6, 2–6
PO	Sep 2012	Germany	2–3	Hamburg	Clay	Doubles (w/ Guccione)	Becker / Petzschner	6–3, 6–2, 2–6, 7–6^{(7–4)}
PO	Sep 2012	Germany	2–3	Hamburg	Clay	Singles 5 (decider)	Cedrik-Marcel Stebe	4–6, 1–6, 4–6
2013
GI 1R	Feb 2013	Chinese Taipei	5–0	Kaohsiung	Hard	Singles 1	Yang Tsung-hua	6–4, 6–4, 6–4
GI 1R	Feb 2013	Chinese Taipei	5–0	Kaohsiung	Hard	Doubles (w/ Guccione)	Lee / Peng	7–6^{(8–6)}, 6–4, 6–2
GI 2R	Apr 2013	Uzbekistan	3–1	Namangan	Clay (i)	Doubles (w/ Ebden)	Dustov / Istomin	7–5, 6–7^{(4–7)}, 6–4, 3–6, 6–3
PO	Sep 2013	Poland	4–1	Warsaw	Clay (i)	Singles 1	Łukasz Kubot	6–1, 6–3, 6–2
2014
1R	Feb 2014	France	0–5	La Roche-sur-Yon	Clay (i)	Singles 2	Jo-Wilfried Tsonga	3–6, 2–6, 6–7^{(2–7)}
1R	Feb 2014	France	0–5	La Roche-sur-Yon	Clay (i)	Doubles (w/ Guccione)	Gasquet / Tsonga	7–5, 6–7^{(4–7)}, 2–6, 5–7
PO	Sep 2014	Uzbekistan	5–0	Perth	Grass	Singles 2	Farrukh Dustov	6–4, 6–4, 6–2
PO	Sep 2014	Uzbekistan	5–0	Perth	Grass	Doubles (w/ Guccione)	Dustov/Istomin	6–3, 7–6^{(7–5)}, 6–2
2015
1R	Mar 2015	Czech Republic	3–2	Ostrava	Hard (i)	Doubles (w/ Groth)	Pavlásek / Veselý	6–1, 6–7^{(2–7)}, 6–3, 6–7^{(4–7)}, 2–6
QF	Jul 2015	Kazakhstan	3–2	Darwin	Grass	Doubles (w/ Groth)	Golubev / Nedovyesov	6–4, 7–6^{(7–4)}, 6–2
QF	Jul 2015	Kazakhstan	3–2	Darwin	Grass	Singles 5 (decider)	Aleksandr Nedovyesov	7–6^{(7–2)}, 6–2, 6–3
SF	Sep 2015	Great Britain	2–3	Glasgow	Hard (i)	Doubles (w/ Groth)	A. Murray / J. Murray	6–4, 3–6, 4–6, 7–6^{(8–6)}, 4–6
2016
1R	Mar 2016	United States	1–3	Melbourne	Grass	Doubles (w/ Peers)	B. Bryan / M. Bryan	3–6, 3–6, 6–4, 6–4, 3–6
2018
PO	Sep 2018	Austria	1–3	Graz	Clay	Doubles (w/ Peers)	Marach / Melzer	6–1, 6–4, 3–6, 7–5
