= 2000 AAPT Championships – Singles =

Singles
- 2000 Next Generation Adelaide International

Final
- Champion: (Australia) Lleyton Hewitt
- Runner-up: (Sweden) Thomas Enqvist
- Score: 3–6, 6–3, 6–2

Details
- Seeds: 8

Events
| Singles | Doubles |
| ← 1999 · | Next Generation Adelaide International | · 2001 → |

Lleyton Hewitt defeated defending champion Thomas Enqvist 3–6, 6–3, 6–2, in a repeat of the previous year's final, to secure the title.

== Seeds ==
1. (Sweden) Thomas Enqvist (final)
2. (United Kingdom) Tim Henman (quarterfinals)
3. (Sweden) Magnus Norman (semifinals)
4. (Slovakia) Dominik Hrbatý (first round)
5. (United States) Vincent Spadea (first round)
6. (Australia) Lleyton Hewitt (champion)
7. (France) Sébastien Grosjean (quarterfinals)
8. (France) Nicolas Escudé (semifinals)

== Draw ==
=== Key ===
- Q = Qualifier
- WC = Wild card
- LL = Lucky loser
- Alt = Alternate
- SE = Special exempt
- PR = Protected ranking
- ITF = ITF entry
- JE = Junior exempt
- w/o = Walkover
- r = Retired
- d = Defaulted
- SR = Special ranking

=== Finals ===
Semifinals
1 | (Sweden) Thomas Enqvist | 3 | 6 | 6
3 | (Sweden) Magnus Norman | 6 | 2 | 2
6 | (Australia) Lleyton Hewitt | 3 | 6 | 6
8 | (France) Nicolas Escudé | 6 | 1 | 4

Final
1 | (Sweden) Thomas Enqvist | 6 | 3 | 2
6 | (Australia) Lleyton Hewitt | 3 | 6 | 6

=== Section 1 ===
First round
1 | (Sweden) T Enqvist | 6 | 6
(France) A Clément | 3 | 4
(Switzerland) R Federer | 6 | 6
(Germany) J Knippschild | 1 | 4
(Australia) W Arthurs | 6 | 6^{5} | 4
(United States) J Gambill | 3 | 7^{7} | 6
(Australia) A Ilie | 2 | 1
7 | (France) S Grosjean | 6 | 6
3 | (Sweden) M Norman | 6 | 6
WC | (Australia) S Draper | 4 | 4
(Australia) R Fromberg | 7^{7} | 5 | 6
WC | (Australia) T Woodbridge | 6^{5} | 7 | 4
(Italy) G Pozzi | 4 | 6 | 2
(Australia) J Sekulov | 6 | 2 | 6
(Spain) A Martín | 6 | 6
5 | (United States) V Spadea | 2 | 2

Second round
1 | (Sweden) T Enqvist | 7^{7} | 6
(Switzerland) R Federer | 6^{5} | 4
(United States) J Gambill | 6 | 6^{4} | 2
7 | (France) S Grosjean | 3 | 7^{7} | 6
3 | (Sweden) M Norman | 7 | 6
(Australia) R Fromberg | 5 | 4
(Australia) J Sekulov | 6^{2} | 6^{5}
(Spain) A Martín | 7^{7} | 7^{7}

Quarterfinals
1 | (Sweden) T Enqvist | 7^{7} | 7
7 | (France) S Grosjean | 6^{1} | 5
3 | (Sweden) M Norman | 6 | 6
(Spain) A Martín | 4 | 3

Semifinals
1 | (Sweden) T Enqvist | 3 | 6 | 6
3 | (Sweden) M Norman | 6 | 2 | 2

=== Section 2 ===
First round
6 | (Australia) L Hewitt | 6 | 2 | 6
(Australia) M Woodforde | 3 | 6 | 1
WC | (Australia) D Petrovic | 3 | 6 | 6
(France) S Huet | 6 | 3 | 3
Q | (Germany) C Vinck | 3 | 6 | 6
(United States) P Goldstein | 6 | 3 | 4
(Australia) J Stoltenberg | 6 | 6
4 | (Slovakia) D Hrbatý | 3 | 1
8 | (France) N Escudé | 6^{5} | 7 | 6
Q | (Australia) P Baccanello | 7^{7} | 5 | 3
(Croatia) I Ljubičić | 4 | 2
(Czech Republic) S Doseděl | 6 | 6
Q | (Australia) M Tebbutt | 6^{4} | 7^{7} | 4
(Monaco) J-R Lisnard | 7^{7} | 6^{4} | 6
Q | (Spain) J Balcells | 4 | 6^{4}
2 | (United Kingdom) T Henman | 6 | 7^{7}

Second round
6 | (Australia) L Hewitt | 6 | 6
WC | (Australia) D Petrovic | 0 | 2
Q | (Germany) C Vinck | 6 | 4 | 4
(Australia) J Stoltenberg | 3 | 6 | 6
8 | (France) N Escudé | 7^{7} | 6
(Czech Republic) S Doseděl | 6^{5} | 4
(Monaco) J-R Lisnard | 6 | 4 | 2
2 | (United Kingdom) T Henman | 3 | 6 | 6

Quarterfinals
6 | (Australia) L Hewitt | 6 | 6
(Australia) J Stoltenberg | 2 | 2
8 | (France) N Escudé | 6 | 6
2 | (United Kingdom) T Henman | 3 | 1

Semifinals
6 | (Australia) L Hewitt | 3 | 6 | 6
8 | (France) N Escudé | 6 | 1 | 4
