= 2000 Next Generation Adelaide International – Doubles =

Doubles
- 2000 Next Generation Adelaide International

Final
- Champions: (Australia) Todd Woodbridge (Australia) Mark Woodforde
- Runners-up: (Australia) Lleyton Hewitt (Australia) Sandon Stolle
- Score: 6–4, 6–2

Events
Singles	Doubles
← 1999 ·	Next Generation Adelaide International	· 2001 →

Gustavo Kuerten and Nicolás Lapentti were the defending champions, but did not participate this year.

Todd Woodbridge and Mark Woodforde won the title, defeating Lleyton Hewitt and Sandon Stolle 6–4, 6–2 in the final.

== Seeds ==
1. (Australia) Todd Woodbridge / (Australia) Mark Woodforde (champions)
2. (Zimbabwe) Wayne Black / (Zimbabwe) Kevin Ullyett (quarterfinals)
3. (Australia) Andrew Kratzmann / (Australia) Peter Tramacchi (first round)
4. (Australia) Wayne Arthurs / (United Kingdom) Tim Henman (semifinals)

== Draw ==
=== Key ===
- Q = Qualifier
- WC = Wild card
- LL = Lucky loser
- Alt = Alternate
- SE = Special exempt
- PR = Protected ranking
- ITF = ITF entry
- JE = Junior exempt
- w/o = Walkover
- r = Retired
- d = Defaulted
- SR = Special ranking

=== Draw ===
First round
1	(Australia) T Woodbridge (Australia) M Woodforde	6	6
WC	(Australia) R Fromberg (Australia) J Sekulov	4	3
(Australia) M Hill (Australia) A Painter	3	2
Q	(Switzerland) R Federer (Slovakia) D Hrbatý	6	6
3	(Australia) A Kratzmann (Australia) P Tramacchi	3	0
(United States) J-M Gambill (United States) S Humphries	6	6
(Italy) M Bertolini (Italy) C Brandi	3	4
(United States) P Goldstein (South Africa) R Koenig	6	6
WC	(Sweden) T Enqvist (Sweden) M Norman	3	3
WC	(Australia) A Ilie (Australia) J Sirianni	6	6
(Australia) J Eagle (Australia) A Florent	7^{7}	2	6^{3}
4	(Australia) W Arthurs (United Kingdom) T Henman	6^{3}	6	7^{7}
(Australia) G Silcock (Australia) M Tebbutt	6	5	3
(Australia) L Hewitt (Australia) S Stolle	2	7	6
(Germany) M Kohlmann (Spain) A Martín	0	4
2	(Zimbabwe) W Black (Zimbabwe) K Ullyett	6	6

Quarterfinals
1	(Australia) T Woodbridge (Australia) M Woodforde	6	6
Q	(Switzerland) R Federer (Slovakia) D Hrbatý	4	3
(United States) J-M Gambill (United States) S Humphries	5	6	4
(United States) P Goldstein (South Africa) R Koenig	7	4	6
WC	(Australia) A Ilie (Australia) J Sirianni	3	2
4	(Australia) W Arthurs (United Kingdom) T Henman	6	6
(Australia) L Hewitt (Australia) S Stolle	3	6	6
2	(Zimbabwe) W Black (Zimbabwe) K Ullyett	6	3	4

Semifinals
1	(Australia) T Woodbridge (Australia) M Woodforde	0	6	6
(United States) P Goldstein (South Africa) R Koenig	6	4	1
4	(Australia) W Arthurs (United Kingdom) T Henman	6^{1}	7^{7}	1
(Australia) L Hewitt (Australia) S Stolle	7^{7}	6^{5}	6

Final
1	(Australia) T Woodbridge (Australia) M Woodforde	6	6
(Australia) L Hewitt (Australia) S Stolle	4	2
