= 2001 AAPT Championships – Doubles =

Doubles
- 2001 AAPT Championships

Final
- Champions: (Australia) David Macpherson (South Africa) Grant Stafford
- Runners-up: (Australia) Wayne Arthurs (Australia) Todd Woodbridge
- Score: 6–7^{(5–7)}, 6–4, 6–4

Events
Singles	Doubles
← 2000 ·	AAPT Championships	· 2002 →

Todd Woodbridge and Mark Woodforde were the defending champions but only Woodbridge competed that year with Wayne Arthurs.

Arthurs and Woodbridge lost in the final 6–7^{(5–7)}, 6–4, 6–4 against David Macpherson and Grant Stafford.

== Seeds ==
1. (Australia) Wayne Arthurs / (Australia) Todd Woodbridge (final)
2. (Australia) Joshua Eagle / (Australia) Andrew Florent (semifinals)
3. (Australia) Michael Hill / (United States) Jeff Tarango (quarterfinals)
4. (United States) Justin Gimelstob / (United States) Scott Humphries (first round)

== Draw ==
=== Key ===
- Q = Qualifier
- WC = Wild card
- LL = Lucky loser
- Alt = Alternate
- SE = Special exempt
- PR = Protected ranking
- ITF = ITF entry
- JE = Junior exempt
- w/o = Walkover
- r = Retired
- d = Defaulted
- SR = Special ranking

First round
1	(Australia) W Arthurs (Australia) T Woodbridge	6	6
WC	(Germany) T Haas (Australia) A Ilie	4	4
(South Africa) C Haggard (Belgium) T Vanhoudt	2	3
(Czech Republic) T Cibulec (Czech Republic) L Friedl	6	6
4	(United States) J Gimelstob (United States) S Humphries	3	4
Q	(Germany) M Kohlmann (France) M Llodra	6	6
(Japan) T Shimada (South Africa) M Wakefield	6	6^{1}	3
(United States) B Bryan (United States) M Bryan	4	7^{7}	6
(South Africa) M Barnard (United States) C Woodruff	3	4
(United States) P Goldstein (Australia) A Kratzmann	6	6
(Australia) D Macpherson (South Africa) G Stafford	0	6	6
3	(Australia) M Hill (United States) J Tarango	6	4	3
(Australia) P Kilderry (Australia) P Tramacchi	6	6
WC	(United Kingdom) J Delgado (United Kingdom) T Henman	2	4
WC	(France) A Clément (France) S Grosjean	6	6^{3}	4
2	(Australia) J Eagle (Australia) A Florent	1	7^{7}	6

Quarterfinals
1	(Australia) W Arthurs (Australia) T Woodbridge	6	6
(Czech Republic) T Cibulec (Czech Republic) L Friedl	3	4
Q	(Germany) M Kohlmann (France) M Llodra	6^{5}	5
(United States) B Bryan (United States) M Bryan	7^{7}	7
(United States) P Goldstein (Australia) A Kratzmann	6^{4}	2
(Australia) D Macpherson (South Africa) G Stafford	7^{7}	6
(Australia) P Kilderry (Australia) P Tramacchi	3	2
2	(Australia) J Eagle (Australia) A Florent	6	6

Semifinals
1	(Australia) W Arthurs (Australia) T Woodbridge	6	6
(United States) B Bryan (United States) M Bryan	2	3
(Australia) D Macpherson (South Africa) G Stafford	6	6
2	(Australia) J Eagle (Australia) A Florent	2	4

Final
1	(Australia) W Arthurs (Australia) T Woodbridge	7^{7}	4	4
(Australia) D Macpherson (South Africa) G Stafford	6^{5}	6	6

== Qualifying ==
=== Seeds ===
1. (Italy) Cristian Brandi / (North Macedonia) Aleksandar Kitinov (first round)
2. (Germany) Michael Kohlmann / (France) Michaël Llodra (Qualifiers)

=== Qualifiers ===
1. (Germany) Michael Kohlmann / (France) Michaël Llodra

==== Draw ====
First round
1	(Italy) Cristian Brandi (North Macedonia) Aleksandar Kitinov	2	6^{1}
(Spain) Alberto Martín (Spain) Germán Puentes	6	7^{7}
WC	(Australia) Tim Crichton (Australia) Ashley Fisher	3	3
2	(Germany) Michael Kohlmann (France) Michaël Llodra	6	6

Final Round
(Spain) Alberto Martín (Spain) Germán Puentes	6^{4}	5
2	(Germany) Michael Kohlmann (France) Michaël Llodra	7^{7}	7
