= 2001 AAPT Championships – Singles =

Singles
- 2001 AAPT Championships

Final
- Champion: (Germany) Tommy Haas
- Runner-up: (Chile) Nicolás Massú
- Score: 6–3, 6–1

Details
- Seeds: 8

Events
Singles	Doubles
- AAPT Championships

The tournament was played between 1 and 7 January 2001. Lleyton Hewitt was the defending champion but lost in the quarterfinals to Tommy Haas.

Haas won in the final 6–3, 6–1 against Nicolás Massú.

== Seeds ==
1. (Australia) Lleyton Hewitt (quarterfinals)
2. (United Kingdom) Tim Henman (semifinals)
3. (France) Arnaud Clément (second round)
4. (France) Sébastien Grosjean (first round)
5. (Germany) Tommy Haas (champion)
6. (Romania) Andrei Pavel (second round)
7. (Sweden) Thomas Johansson (quarterfinals)
8. (Australia) Andrew Ilie (first round)

== Draw ==
Key

- Q = Qualifier
- WC = Wild card
- LL = Lucky loser
- Alt = Alternate
- ITF = ITF entry
- PR = Protected ranking
- SR = Special ranking
- SE = Special exempt
- JE = Junior exempt
- JR = Junior Accelerator Programme entrant
- CO = College Accelerator Programme entrant
- NG = Next Gen Accelerator Program entrant
- w/o = Walkover
- r = Retired
- d = Defaulted

=== Finals ===
Semifinals
5	(Germany) Tommy Haas	7^{7}	6
(Australia) Jason Stoltenberg	6^{3}	4
(Chile) Nicolás Massú	3	7	6
2	(United Kingdom) Tim Henman	6	5	2

Final
5	(Germany) Tommy Haas	6	6
(Chile) Nicolás Massú	3	1

=== Top half ===
First round
WC/1	(Australia) L Hewitt	6	6
(Australia) W Arthurs	4	3
WC	(Australia) T Woodbridge	5	1
Q	(Germany) B Phau	7	6
(United States) C Woodruff	6	3	2
Q	(Belgium) X Malisse	2	6	6
WC	(Australia) L Smith	3	3
5	(Germany) T Haas	6	6
4	(France) S Grosjean	3	2
(Australia) J Stoltenberg	6	6
Q	(Australia) A Jones	4	2
(United States) P Goldstein	6	6
(Spain) A Martín	6	6
(Spain) G Puentes	2	3
(Belgium) C Rochus	1	7^{7}	7
8	(Australia) A Ilie	6	6^{2}	5

Second round
WC/1	(Australia) L Hewitt	6^{5}	6	6
Q	(Germany) B Phau	7^{7}	4	0
Q	(Belgium) X Malisse	5	3
5	(Germany) T Haas	7	6
(Australia) J Stoltenberg	6	6
(United States) P Goldstein	2	2
(Spain) A Martín	3	7^{7}	7
(Belgium) C Rochus	6	6^{5}	5

Quarterfinals
WC/1	(Australia) L Hewitt	4	6	1
5	(Germany) T Haas	6	0	6
(Australia) J Stoltenberg	6	6
(Spain) A Martín	3	4

Semifinals
5	(Germany) T Haas	7^{7}	6
(Australia) J Stoltenberg	6^{3}	4

=== Bottom half ===
First round
6	(Romania) A Pavel	6	6
(United States) J Gimelstob	2	2
(Croatia) I Ljubičić	6	7
(Armenia) S Sargsian	2	5
(Chile) N Massú	6	6
(Netherlands) R Sluiter	2	4
(Italy) A Gaudenzi	7^{7}	0	3
3	(France) A Clément	6^{1}	6	6
7	(Sweden) T Johansson	7^{7}	6
(Spain) F Mantilla	6^{3}	2
(Germany) A Popp	6^{5}	4
(Germany) C Vinck	7^{7}	6
(United States) J Tarango	6	7^{7}
Q	(Germany) M Kohlmann	3	6^{4}
(United Kingdom) G Rusedski	2	6^{4}
2	(United Kingdom) T Henman	6	7^{7}

Second round
6	(Romania) A Pavel	6	5	4
(Croatia) I Ljubičić	3	7	6
(Chile) N Massú	6	6
3	(France) A Clément	2	2
7	(Sweden) T Johansson	7	6
(Germany) C Vinck	5	3
(United States) J Tarango	1	4
2	(United Kingdom) T Henman	6	6

Quarterfinals
(Croatia) I Ljubičić	7^{7}	6^{5}	2
(Chile) N Massú	6^{5}	7^{7}	6
7	(Sweden) T Johansson	6^{2}	7^{7}	3
2	(United Kingdom) T Henman	7^{7}	6^{4}	6

Semifinals
(Chile) N Massú	3	7	6
2	(United Kingdom) T Henman	6	5	2

== Qualifying ==
=== Seeds ===
1. n/a
2. (Belgium) Xavier Malisse (Qualifier)
3. (Italy) Cristiano Caratti (second round)
4. (United States) Bob Bryan (second round)
5. (France) Michaël Llodra (second round)
6. (Italy) Stefano Tarallo (first round)
7. (Austria) Werner Eschauer (second round)
8. (Spain) Julián Alonso (first round)

=== Qualifiers ===
1. (Germany) Björn Phau
2. (Belgium) Xavier Malisse
3. (Australia) Alun Jones
4. (Germany) Michael Kohlmann

=== Draw ===
==== First qualifier ====
First round
Alt	(France) Jean-Michel Pequery	6	6
WC	(France) Nicolas Mahut	3	2
(France) Éric Prodon	6^{4}	7^{7}	6
WC	(Australia) Josh Tuckfield	7^{7}	6^{5}	3
(Australia) Michael Hill	6^{5}	4
(Germany) Björn Phau	7^{7}	6
(Greece) Solon Peppas	4	1
5	(France) Michaël Llodra	6	6

Second round
Alt	(France) Jean-Michel Pequery	6	6
(France) Éric Prodon	3	2
(Germany) Björn Phau	6	6
5	(France) Michaël Llodra	3	2

Final Round
Alt	(France) Jean-Michel Pequery	4	4
(Germany) Björn Phau	6	6

==== Second qualifier ====
First round
2	(Belgium) Xavier Malisse	6	6
(Germany) Jakub Záhlava	1	4
(Argentina) Guillermo Cañas	6	6
(Russia) Dmitry Vlasov	2	2
(Australia) Scott Draper	6	6
(Monaco) Jean-René Lisnard	1	4
(New Zealand) Mark Nielsen	4	2
7	(Austria) Werner Eschauer	6	6

Second round
2	(Belgium) Xavier Malisse	6	6
(Argentina) Guillermo Cañas	3	2
(Australia) Scott Draper	6	6
7	(Austria) Werner Eschauer	4	3

Final Round
2	(Belgium) Xavier Malisse	6	6
(Australia) Scott Draper	3	3

==== Third qualifier ====
First round
3	(Italy) Cristiano Caratti	6	6
(Azerbaijan) Emin Ağayev	4	1
WC	(Australia) Paul Baccanello	6^{1}	6	6
(Austria) Clemens Trimmel	7^{7}	2	4
WC	(Australia) Alun Jones	7	6
(United Kingdom) Jamie Delgado	5	1
(South Africa) Marcos Ondruska	7^{7}	7^{7}
8	(Spain) Julián Alonso	6^{3}	6^{4}

Second round
3	(Italy) Cristiano Caratti	3	4
WC	(Australia) Paul Baccanello	6	6
WC	(Australia) Alun Jones	5	7	6
(South Africa) Marcos Ondruska	7	5	4

Final Round
WC	(Australia) Paul Baccanello	3	4
WC	(Australia) Alun Jones	6	6

==== Fourth qualifier ====
First round
4	(United States) Bob Bryan	6	6
(United States) Mike Bryan	3	4
(Australia) James Sekulov	3	1
(Australia) Dejan Petrovic	6	6
(Russia) Denis Golovanov	6	6
(Republic of Ireland) Scott Barron	3	2
(Germany) Michael Kohlmann	6	6
6	(Italy) Stefano Tarallo	4	2

Second round
4	(United States) Bob Bryan	4	2
(Australia) Dejan Petrovic	6	6
(Russia) Denis Golovanov	5	0
(Germany) Michael Kohlmann	7	6

Final Round
(Australia) Dejan Petrovic	4	5
(Germany) Michael Kohlmann	6	7
