= 1999 AAPT Championships =

- Date: 4–11 January
- Edition: 22nd
- Category: World Series
- Draw: 32S / 16D
- Prize money: $325,000
- Surface: Hard / outdoor
- Location: Adelaide, Australia

Champions

Singles
- (Sweden) Thomas Enqvist

Doubles
- (Brazil) Gustavo Kuerten / (Ecuador) Nicolás Lapentti
- Australian Hard Court Championships

The 1999 AAPT Championships was a men's ATP tennis tournament held in Adelaide, Australia and played on outdoor hardcourts. It was the 22nd edition of the tournament and was held from 4 to 11 January. Second-seeded Thomas Enqvist won his first title of the year and the 15th of his career.

== Finals ==
=== Singles ===
(Sweden) Thomas Enqvist defeated (Australia) Lleyton Hewitt 4–6, 6–1, 6–2

- It was Enqvist's 1st singles title of the year and the 14th of his career.

=== Doubles ===
(Brazil) Gustavo Kuerten / (Ecuador) Nicolás Lapentti defeated (United States) Jim Courier / (United States) Patrick Galbraith 6–4, 6–4
