= 2002 Western & Southern Financial Group Masters – Singles =

Singles
- 2002 Western & Southern Financial Group Masters

Final
- Champion: (Spain) Carlos Moyà
- Runner-up: (Australia) Lleyton Hewitt
- Score: 7–5, 7–6^{(7–5)}

Details
- Draw: 64 (4WC/8Q)
- Seeds: 16

Events
Singles	Doubles
- Cincinnati Masters

Carlos Moyá defeated Lleyton Hewitt in the final, 7–5, 7–6^{(7–5)} to win the singles tennis title at the 2002 Cincinnati Masters.

Gustavo Kuerten was the defending champion, but lost in the first round to Tim Henman.

== Seeds ==
1. (Australia) Lleyton Hewitt (final)
2. (Russia) Marat Safin (first round)
3. (Germany) Tommy Haas (first round)
4. (United Kingdom) Tim Henman (second round)
5. (Russia) Yevgeny Kafelnikov (first round)
6. (United States) Andre Agassi (quarterfinals)
7. (Spain) Albert Costa (second round)
8. (Spain) Juan Carlos Ferrero (semifinals)
9. (Sweden) Thomas Johansson (first round)
10. (Switzerland) Roger Federer (first round)
11. (France) Sébastien Grosjean (first round)
12. (United States) Andy Roddick (quarterfinals)
13. (Czech Republic) Jiří Novák (first round)
14. (Argentina) David Nalbandian (first round)
15. (United States) Pete Sampras (second round)
16. (Spain) Carlos Moyá (champion)

== Draw ==
Key

- Q = Qualifier
- WC = Wild card
- LL = Lucky loser
- Alt = Alternate
- ITF = ITF entry
- PR = Protected ranking
- SR = Special ranking
- SE = Special exempt
- JE = Junior exempt
- JR = Junior Accelerator Programme entrant
- CO = College Accelerator Programme entrant
- NG = Next Gen Accelerator Program entrant
- w/o = Walkover
- r = Retired
- d = Defaulted

=== Finals ===
Quarterfinals
1	(Australia) Lleyton Hewitt	7	6
6	(United States) Andre Agassi	5	3
(Chile) Fernando González	7^{7}	7^{8}
12	(United States) Andy Roddick	6^{4}	6^{6}
(Germany) Rainer Schüttler	6^{3}	1
16	(Spain) Carlos Moyá	7^{7}	6
8	(Spain) Juan Carlos Ferrero	6	7^{7}
Q	(Australia) Wayne Arthurs	4	6^{2}

Semifinals
1	(Australia) Lleyton Hewitt	6^{3}	7	6
(Chile) Fernando González	7^{7}	5	2
16	(Spain) Carlos Moyá	6	6
8	(Spain) Juan Carlos Ferrero	3	4

Final
1	(Australia) Lleyton Hewitt	5	6^{5}
16	(Spain) Carlos Moyá	7	7^{7}

=== Top half ===
==== Section 1 ====
First round
1	(Australia) L Hewitt	6	6
Q	(United States) R Ginepri	0	0
(Italy) D Sanguinetti	3	6	6
(Sweden) J Björkman	6	1	2
Q	(South Korea) H-T Lee	6	7
(Czech Republic) B Ulihrach	3	5
(Finland) J Nieminen	3	6	6
14	(Argentina) D Nalbandian	6	3	4
11	(France) S Grosjean	3	6	4
(Slovakia) D Hrbatý	6	3	6
(Sweden) T Enqvist	6	6
(Austria) S Koubek	4	0
Q	(Argentina) G Coria	6	6
(Argentina) J I Chela	3	4
(Morocco) Y El Aynaoui	4	6	4
6	(United States) A Agassi	6	4	6

Second round
1	(Australia) L Hewitt	5
(Italy) D Sanguinetti	0^{r}
Q	(South Korea) H-T Lee	2	6	5
(Finland) J Nieminen	6	3	7
(Slovakia) D Hrbatý	3	2
(Sweden) T Enqvist	6	6
Q	(Argentina) G Coria	0	2
6	(United States) A Agassi	6	6

Third round
1	(Australia) L Hewitt	2	6	6
(Finland) J Nieminen	6	2	3
(Sweden) T Enqvist	4	5
6	(United States) A Agassi	6	7

Quarterfinals
1	(Australia) L Hewitt	7	6
6	(United States) A Agassi	5	3

==== Section 2 ====
First round
4	(United Kingdom) T Henman	6	6
(Brazil) G Kuerten	3	4
(France) A Clément	4	2
(Chile) F González	6	6
Q	(Australia) M Philippoussis	4	7^{7}	6
(France) F Santoro	6	6^{2}	3
(Netherlands) R Krajicek	6	6
13	(Czech Republic) J Novák	4	4
12	(United States) A Roddick	6	6
(Switzerland) M Kratochvil	3	3
(Germany) N Kiefer	6	7^{8}
(Belarus) M Mirnyi	3	6^{6}
(South Africa) W Ferreira	7^{7}	7^{7}
(Argentina) M Zabaleta	6^{3}	6^{3}
(Ecuador) N Lapentti	6	6^{4}	4
7	(Spain) A Costa	4	7^{7}	6

Second round
4	(United Kingdom) T Henman	6^{3}	2
(Chile) F González	7^{7}	6
Q	(Australia) M Philippoussis	6^{7}	2
(Netherlands) R Krajicek	7^{9}	6
12	(United States) A Roddick	6	6
(Germany) N Kiefer	4	3
(South Africa) W Ferreira	7^{8}	6
7	(Spain) A Costa	6^{6}	2

Third round
(Chile) F González	6	3	6
(Netherlands) R Krajicek	2	6	3
12	(United States) A Roddick	6	6
(South Africa) W Ferreira	3	2

Quarterfinals
(Chile) F González	7^{7}	7^{8}
12	(United States) A Roddick	6^{4}	6^{6}

=== Bottom half ===
==== Section 3 ====
First round
5	(Russia) Y Kafelnikov	3	2
(Germany) R Schüttler	6	6
(Sweden) M Norman	4	2
WC	(United States) J-M Gambill	6	6
(France) J Boutter	7^{7}	6^{4}	4
(Belgium) X Malisse	6^{4}	7^{7}	6
(Croatia) I Ljubičić	2	6	6
10	(Switzerland) R Federer	6	4	3
16	(Spain) C Moyá	6	6
Q	(France) C Saulnier	3	3
(Netherlands) S Schalken	7^{7}	4	6
(Spain) F Mantilla	6^{3}	6	3
WC	(United States) J Morrison	4	1
(Spain) F Vicente	6	6
WC	(United States) M Chang	6	6
3	(Germany) T Haas	3	2

Second round
(Germany) R Schüttler	6^{2}	7	6
WC	(United States) J-M Gambill	7^{7}	5	3
(Belgium) X Malisse	4	7^{9}	7^{9}
(Croatia) I Ljubičić	6	6^{7}	6^{7}
16	(Spain) C Moyá	6	6
(Netherlands) S Schalken	2	4
(Spain) F Vicente	7	6^{4}	0
WC	(United States) M Chang	5	7^{7}	6

Third round
(Germany) R Schüttler	6	6
(Belgium) X Malisse	4	3
16	(Spain) C Moyá	6	6
WC	(United States) M Chang	4	3

Quarterfinals
(Germany) R Schüttler	6^{3}	1
16	(Spain) C Moyá	7^{7}	6

==== Section 4 ====
First round
8	(Spain) J C Ferrero	7^{7}	6
Q	(Paraguay) R Delgado	6^{1}	1
(Romania) A Pavel	4	6^{9}
(United States) J Blake	6	7^{11}
(Argentina) G Gaudio	3	2
(Chile) M Ríos	6	6
WC	(United States) T Dent	6	6
9	(Sweden) T Johansson	4	3
15	(United States) P Sampras	5	7^{8}	6
(Argentina) G Cañas	7	6^{6}	3
Q	(Australia) W Arthurs	6	7^{7}
Q	(Israel) N Okun	3	6^{3}
(United States) T Martin	6	4	6^{1}
(Spain) T Robredo	4	6	7^{7}
(United Kingdom) G Rusedski	7^{9}	6
2	(Russia) M Safin	6^{7}	2

Second round
8	(Spain) J C Ferrero	6	4	6
(United States) J Blake	4	6	4
(Chile) M Ríos	2	3
WC	(United States) T Dent	6	6
15	(United States) P Sampras	6	3	6^{4}
Q	(Australia) W Arthurs	4	6	7^{7}
(Spain) T Robredo	6	3	6
(United Kingdom) G Rusedski	2	6	3

Third round
8	(Spain) J C Ferrero	6^{5}	6	7^{7}
WC	(United States) T Dent	7^{7}	1	6^{4}
Q	(Australia) W Arthurs	7^{7}	4	6
(Spain) T Robredo	6^{3}	6	4

Quarterfinals
8	(Spain) J C Ferrero	6	7^{7}
Q	(Australia) W Arthurs	4	6^{2}

== Qualifying ==
=== Qualifying seeds ===
1. (Spain) Alberto Martín (qualifying competition)
2. (Thailand) Paradorn Srichaphan (qualifying competition)
3. (Australia) Wayne Arthurs (qualified)
4. (United States) Vince Spadea (qualifying competition, retired)
5. (Australia) Mark Philippoussis (qualified)
6. (Czech Republic) Radek Štěpánek (first round)
7. (Denmark) Kristian Pless (first round)
8. (France) Michaël Llodra (first round)
9. (South Korea) Lee Hyung-taik (qualified)
10. (Argentina) Guillermo Coria (qualified)
11. (Netherlands) Martin Verkerk (first round)
12. (United States) Robby Ginepri (qualified)
13. (Denmark) Kenneth Carlsen (first round)
14. (Philippines) Cecil Mamiit (first round)
15. (United States) Alex Kim (first round)
16. (Uzbekistan) Oleg Ogorodov (qualifying competition)

=== Qualifiers ===
1. (Paraguay) Ramón Delgado
2. (United States) Robby Ginepri
3. (Australia) Wayne Arthurs
4. (Argentina) Guillermo Coria
5. (Australia) Mark Philippoussis
6. (Israel) Noam Okun
7. (South Korea) Lee Hyung-taik
8. (France) Cyril Saulnier

=== Qualifying draw ===
==== First qualifier ====
First round
1	(Spain) Alberto Martín	7^{7}	6
WC	(United States) Jason Zimmermann	6^{4}	0
(Paraguay) Ramón Delgado	6	7^{7}
14	(Philippines) Cecil Mamiit	4	6^{3}

Qualifying competition
1	(Spain) Alberto Martín	3	4
(Paraguay) Ramón Delgado	6	6

==== Second qualifier ====
First round
2	(Thailand) Paradorn Srichaphan	7	6^{3}	6
(Zimbabwe) Wayne Black	5	7^{7}	2
WC	(United States) Rey Puentes	0	0
12	(United States) Robby Ginepri	6	6

Qualifying competition
2	(Thailand) Paradorn Srichaphan	5	2
12	(United States) Robby Ginepri	7	6

==== Third qualifier ====
First round
3	(Australia) Wayne Arthurs	7^{9}	6^{3}	6
(France) Cédric Pioline	6^{7}	7^{7}	4
(Romania) Gabriel Trifu	4^{r}
16	(Uzbekistan) Oleg Ogorodov	5

Qualifying competition
3	(Australia) Wayne Arthurs	7^{7}	6^{4}	6
16	(Uzbekistan) Oleg Ogorodov	6^{4}	7^{7}	4

==== Fourth qualifier ====
First round
4	(United States) Vince Spadea	6	6
(United States) Mardy Fish	4	4
(Israel) Harel Levy	6	2	5
10	(Argentina) Guillermo Coria	4	6	7

Qualifying competition
4	(United States) Vince Spadea	6^{5}	0^{r}
10	(Argentina) Guillermo Coria	7^{7}	4

==== Fifth qualifier ====
First round
5	(Australia) Mark Philippoussis	4	6	6
WC	(United States) Jesse Witten	6	1	4
(Argentina) Gastón Etlis	5	7^{7}	6
15	(United States) Alex Kim	7	6^{3}	3

Qualifying competition
5	(Australia) Mark Philippoussis	6	6
(Argentina) Gastón Etlis	4	1

==== Sixth qualifier ====
First round
6	(Czech Republic) Radek Štěpánek	1	5
(United States) Michael Russell	6	7
(Israel) Noam Okun	6	3	7^{7}
11	(Netherlands) Martin Verkerk	4	6	6^{3}

Qualifying competition
(United States) Michael Russell	6^{4}	4
(Israel) Noam Okun	7^{7}	6

==== Seventh qualifier ====
First round
7	(Denmark) Kristian Pless	6^{2}	7^{7}	4
(South Africa) Louis Vosloo	7^{7}	6^{0}	6
WC	(United States) Levar Harper-Griffith	3	4
9	(South Korea) Lee Hyung-taik	6	6

Qualifying competition
(South Africa) Louis Vosloo	4	0
9	(South Korea) Lee Hyung-taik	6	6

==== Eighth qualifier ====
First round
8	(France) Michaël Llodra	4	4
(Federal Republic of Yugoslavia) Nenad Zimonjić	6	6
(France) Cyril Saulnier	6	6
13	(Denmark) Kenneth Carlsen	3	2

Qualifying competition
(Federal Republic of Yugoslavia) Nenad Zimonjić	6	2	5
(France) Cyril Saulnier	4	6	7
