= 1999 AAPT Championships – Doubles =

Doubles
- 1999 Next Generation Adelaide International

Final
- Champions: (Brazil) Gustavo Kuerten (Ecuador) Nicolás Lapentti
- Runners-up: (United States) Jim Courier (United States) Patrick Galbraith
- Score: 6–4, 6–4

Details
- Draw: 16
- Seeds: 4

Events
Singles	Doubles
- Next Generation Adelaide International

Joshua Eagle and Andrew Florent were the defending champions, but did not participate together this year. Eagle partnered Patrick Rafter, losing in the quarterfinals. Florent partnered Andrew Kratzmann, losing in the first round.

Gustavo Kuerten and Nicolás Lapentti won the title, defeating Jim Courier and Patrick Galbraith 6–4, 6–4 in the final.

== Seeds ==
1. (Australia) Todd Woodbridge / (Australia) Mark Woodforde (first round, retired)
2. (Australia) Joshua Eagle / (Australia) Patrick Rafter (quarterfinals)
3. (United States) Justin Gimelstob / (Canada) Sébastien Lareau (quarterfinals, withdrew)
4. (South Africa) David Adams / (South Africa) John-Laffnie de Jager (first round)

== Draw ==
Key

- Q = Qualifier
- WC = Wild card
- LL = Lucky loser
- Alt = Alternate
- ITF = ITF entry
- PR = Protected ranking
- SR = Special ranking
- SE = Special exempt
- JE = Junior exempt
- JR = Junior Accelerator Programme entrant
- CO = College Accelerator Programme entrant
- NG = Next Gen Accelerator Program entrant
- w/o = Walkover
- r = Retired
- d = Defaulted

=== Draw ===
First round
1	(Australia) T Woodbridge (Australia) M Woodforde	4	2^{r}
(Brazil) G Kuerten (Ecuador) N Lapentti	6	1
(New Zealand) J Greenhalgh (New Zealand) B Steven	6	4	6
(Argentina) D del Río (Argentina) M Puerta	4	6	3
3	(United States) J Gimelstob (Canada) S Lareau	6	6
(Serbia and Montenegro) N Djordjevic (Czech Republic) J Novák	2	2
(Australia) W Arthurs (Australia) P Tramacchi	4	6
Q	(Germany) N Kiefer (Germany) D Prinosil	6	7
(Australia) A Florent (Australia) A Kratzmann	4	6	3
WC	(United States) J Courier (United States) P Galbraith	6	4	6
WC	(Australia) L Hewitt (Australia) P Kilderry	6	6
4	(South Africa) D Adams (South Africa) J-L de Jager	4	2
WC	(Australia) S Draper (Australia) J Stoltenberg	4	3
(Zimbabwe) B Black (Australia) S Stolle	6	6
(Sweden) N Kulti (Sweden) M Tillström	6	6	4
2	(Australia) J Eagle (Australia) P Rafter	4	7	6

Quarterfinals
(Brazil) G Kuerten (Ecuador) N Lapentti	6	3	6
(New Zealand) J Greenhalgh (New Zealand) B Steven	4	6	1
3	(United States) J Gimelstob (Canada) S Lareau
Q	(Germany) N Kiefer (Germany) D Prinosil	w/o
WC	(United States) J Courier (United States) P Galbraith	6	6
WC	(Australia) L Hewitt (Australia) P Kilderry	2	4
(Zimbabwe) B Black (Australia) S Stolle	3	6	7
2	(Australia) J Eagle (Australia) P Rafter	6	2	6

Semifinals
(Brazil) G Kuerten (Ecuador) N Lapentti	6	6
Q	(Germany) N Kiefer (Germany) D Prinosil	4	4
WC	(United States) J Courier (United States) P Galbraith	6	7
(Zimbabwe) B Black (Australia) S Stolle	4	5

Final
(Brazil) G Kuerten (Ecuador) N Lapentti	6	6
WC	(United States) J Courier (United States) P Galbraith	4	4
