= 2002 Western & Southern Financial Group Masters =

- Date: August 5–12
- Edition: 101st
- Category: Tennis Masters Series
- Draw: 64S / 32D
- Prize money: $2,450,000
- Surface: Hard / outdoor
- Location: Mason, United States
- Venue: Lindner Family Tennis Center

Champions

Singles
- (Spain) Carlos Moyá

Doubles
- (United States) James Blake / (United States) Todd Martin
- Cincinnati Masters

The 2002 Western & Southern Financial Group Masters was a men's tennis tournament played on outdoor hard courts. It was the 101st edition of the Cincinnati Masters and was part of the Tennis Masters Series of the 2002 ATP Tour. It took place at the Lindner Family Tennis Center in Mason, Ohio in the United States from August 5 through August 12, 2002. Carlos Moyá, who was seeded 16th, won the singles title.

The tournament had previously appeared as part of Tier III of the WTA Tour but no event was held from 1989 to 2003.

== Finals ==
=== Singles ===
(Spain) Carlos Moyá defeated (Australia) Lleyton Hewitt 7–5, 7–6^{(7–5)}

- It was Moyá's 4th title of the year and the 11th of his career. It was his 1st Masters title of the year and his 2nd overall.

=== Doubles ===
(United States) James Blake / (United States) Todd Martin defeated (India) Mahesh Bhupathi / (Belarus) Max Mirnyi 7–5, 6–3

- It was Blake's 1st title of the year and the 1st of his career. It was Martin's only title of the year and the 13th of his career.
