= 2002 Western & Southern Financial Group Masters – Doubles =

Doubles
- 2002 Western & Southern Financial Group Masters

Final
- Champions: (United States) James Blake (United States) Todd Martin
- Runners-up: (India) Mahesh Bhupathi (Belarus) Max Mirnyi
- Score: 7–5, 6–3

Events
Singles	Doubles
← 2001 ·	Western & Southern Financial Group Masters	· 2003 →

Mahesh Bhupathi and Leander Paes were the defending champions but they competed with different partners that year, Bhupathi with Max Mirnyi and Paes with Michael Hill.

Hill and Paes lost in the first round to Ivan Ljubičić and Andrei Pavel.

Bhupathi and Mirnyi lost in the final 7–5, 6–3 against James Blake and Todd Martin.

== Seeds ==
1. (The Bahamas) Mark Knowles / (Canada) Daniel Nestor (quarterfinals)
2. (United States) Donald Johnson / (United States) Jared Palmer (quarterfinals)
3. (India) Mahesh Bhupathi / (Belarus) Max Mirnyi (final)
4. (Zimbabwe) Wayne Black / (Zimbabwe) Kevin Ullyett (second round)
5. (Czech Republic) Martin Damm / (Czech Republic) Cyril Suk (semifinals)
6. (United States) Bob Bryan / (United States) Mike Bryan (quarterfinals)
7. (Germany) David Prinosil / (Czech Republic) David Rikl (second round)
8. (Australia) Joshua Eagle / (Australia) Sandon Stolle (quarterfinals)

== Draw ==
=== Key ===
- Q = Qualifier
- WC = Wild card
- LL = Lucky loser
- Alt = Alternate
- ITF = ITF entry
- PR = Protected ranking
- SR = Special ranking
- SE = Special exempt
- JE = Junior exempt
- JR = Junior Accelerator Programme entrant
- CO = College Accelerator Programme entrant
- NG = Next Gen Accelerator Program entrant
- w/o = Walkover
- r = Retired
- d = Defaulted

=== Final ===
Semifinals
5	(Czech Republic) Martin Damm (Czech Republic) Cyril Suk	6^{7}	6^{4}
WC	(United States) James Blake (United States) Todd Martin	7^{9}	7^{7}
3	(India) Mahesh Bhupathi (Belarus) Max Mirnyi	7	6
(Czech Republic) Jiří Novák (Czech Republic) Radek Štěpánek	5	3

Final
WC	(United States) James Blake (United States) Todd Martin	7	6
3	(India) Mahesh Bhupathi (Belarus) Max Mirnyi	5	3

=== Top half ===
First round
1	(The Bahamas) M Knowles (Canada) D Nestor	6	7^{7}
(United States) B MacPhie (Federal Republic of Yugoslavia) N Zimonjić	4	6^{3}
(Australia) P Hanley (Japan) T Shimada	6	3	2
(Switzerland) R Federer (South Africa) W Ferreira	1	6	6
(Australia) M Hill (India) L Paes	4	6^{3}
(Croatia) I Ljubičić (Romania) A Pavel	6	7^{7}
(France) M Llodra (France) F Santoro	4	4
5	(Czech Republic) M Damm (Czech Republic) C Suk	6	6
4	(Zimbabwe) W Black (Zimbabwe) K Ullyett	6	6
(United States) R Leach (Australia) D Macpherson	3	4
(Argentina) L Arnold (South Africa) R Koenig	6^{4}	5
WC	(United States) J Blake (United States) T Martin	7^{7}	7
(Russia) Y Kafelnikov (Russia) M Safin	6^{5}	3
(South Africa) D Adams (Argentina) G Etlis	7^{7}	6
(Australia) W Arthurs (Australia) A Kratzmann	6^{7}	4
8	(Australia) J Eagle (Australia) S Stolle	7^{9}	6

Second round
1	(The Bahamas) M Knowles (Canada) D Nestor	w/o
(Switzerland) R Federer (South Africa) W Ferreira
(Croatia) I Ljubičić (Romania) A Pavel	4	4
5	(Czech Republic) M Damm (Czech Republic) C Suk	6	6
4	(Zimbabwe) W Black (Zimbabwe) K Ullyett	3	6	4
WC	(United States) J Blake (United States) T Martin	6	1	6
(South Africa) D Adams (Argentina) G Etlis	3	3
8	(Australia) J Eagle (Australia) S Stolle	6	6

Quarterfinals
1	(The Bahamas) M Knowles (Canada) D Nestor	7	2	4
5	(Czech Republic) M Damm (Czech Republic) C Suk	5	6	6
WC	(United States) J Blake (United States) T Martin	6	3	6
8	(Australia) J Eagle (Australia) S Stolle	4	6	3

Semifinals
5	(Czech Republic) M Damm (Czech Republic) C Suk	6^{7}	6^{4}
WC	(United States) J Blake (United States) T Martin	7^{9}	7^{7}

=== Bottom half ===
First round
6	(United States) B Bryan (United States) M Bryan	7^{9}	6
WC	(United States) L Jensen (United States) M Jensen	6^{7}	3
(Czech Republic) T Cibulec (Czech Republic) D Vacek	6	4	4
WC	(Australia) A Florent (Australia) L Hewitt	2	6	6
(United States) J-M Gambill (Netherlands) S Schalken	6^{3}	4
Alt	(France) S Grosjean (Germany) N Kiefer	7^{7}	6
(Belgium) X Malisse (Germany) R Schüttler	3	2
3	(India) M Bhupathi (Belarus) M Mirnyi	6	6
7	(Germany) D Prinosil (Czech Republic) D Rikl	3	6	7^{8}
(South Africa) E Ferreira (United States) J Tarango	6	2	6^{6}
(Czech Republic) J Novák (Czech Republic) R Štěpánek	6	6
(Morocco) Y El Aynaoui (Spain) T Robredo	3	2
(Sweden) J Björkman (Slovakia) D Hrbatý	5	6	3
(Czech Republic) P Pála (Czech Republic) P Vízner	7	3	6
(France) J Boutter (France) A Clément	4	5
2	(United States) D Johnson (United States) J Palmer	6	7

Second round
6	(United States) B Bryan (United States) M Bryan	6	6
WC	(Australia) A Florent (Australia) L Hewitt	2	3
Alt	(France) S Grosjean (Germany) N Kiefer	1	6	3
3	(India) M Bhupathi (Belarus) M Mirnyi	6	3	6
7	(Germany) D Prinosil (Czech Republic) D Rikl	4	6^{2}
(Czech Republic) J Novák (Czech Republic) R Štěpánek	6	7^{7}
(Czech Republic) P Pála (Czech Republic) P Vízner
2	(United States) D Johnson (United States) J Palmer	w/o

Quarterfinals
6	(United States) B Bryan (United States) M Bryan	5	2
3	(India) M Bhupathi (Belarus) M Mirnyi	7	6
(Czech Republic) J Novák (Czech Republic) R Štěpánek	6	3	6
2	(United States) D Johnson (United States) J Palmer	4	6	3

Semifinals
3	(India) M Bhupathi (Belarus) M Mirnyi	7	6
(Czech Republic) J Novák (Czech Republic) R Štěpánek	5	3
