= 2000 AAPT Championships =

2000 Next Generation Adelaide International
- Date: 3–9 January
- Edition: 23rd
- Category: International Series
- Draw: 32S / 16D
- Prize money: $325,000
- Surface: Hard / outdoor
- Location: Adelaide, Australia

Champions

Singles
- (Australia) Lleyton Hewitt

Doubles
- (Australia) Todd Woodbridge / (Australia) Mark Woodforde
- Next Generation Adelaide International

The 2000 Next Generation Adelaide International was a men's ATP tennis tournament held in Adelaide, Australia and played on outdoor hardcourts. It was the 23rd edition of the tournament and was held from 3 January until 9 January 2000. Lleyton Hewitt won his first title of the year and the 3rd of his career.

== Finals ==
=== Singles ===
(Australia) Lleyton Hewitt defeated (Sweden) Thomas Enqvist 3–6, 6–3, 6–2

=== Doubles ===
(Australia) Todd Woodbridge / (Australia) Mark Woodforde defeated (Australia) Lleyton Hewitt / (Australia) Sandon Stolle 6–4, 6–2
