= 2001 AAPT Championships =

- Date: 1–7 January
- Edition: 24th
- Category: International Series
- Draw: 32S / 16D
- Prize money: $350,000
- Surface: Hard / Outdoor
- Location: Adelaide, Australia
- Venue: Memorial Drive Park

Champions

Singles
- (Germany) Tommy Haas

Doubles
- (Australia) David Macpherson / (South Africa) Grant Stafford
- AAPT Championships

The 2001 AAPT Championships was a men's ATP tennis tournament played on outdoor hard courts at the Memorial Drive Park in Adelaide in Australia and was part of the International Series of the 2001 ATP Tour. It was the 24th edition of the tournament and ran from 1 through 7 January 2001. Tommy Haas won the singles title.

== Finals ==
=== Singles ===
(Germany) Tommy Haas defeated (Chile) Nicolás Massú 6–3, 6–1

- It was Haas' 1st title of the year and the 2nd of his career.

=== Doubles ===
(Australia) David Macpherson / (South Africa) Grant Stafford defeated (Australia) Wayne Arthurs / (Australia) Todd Woodbridge 6–7^{(5–7)}, 6–4, 6–4

- It was Macpherson's 1st title of the year and the 14th of his career. It was Stafford's only title of the year and the 5th of his career.

== Entrants ==
=== Seeds ===
Country	Player	Rank^{1}	Seed
AUS	Lleyton Hewitt	7	1
GBR	Tim Henman	10	2
FRA	Arnaud Clément	18	3
FRA	Sébastien Grosjean	19	4
GER	Tommy Haas	23	5
ROM	Andrei Pavel	27	6
SWE	Thomas Johansson	39	7
AUS	Andrew Ilie	50	8

- Rankings are as of 25 December 2000.

=== Other entrants ===
The following players received wildcards into the singles main draw:

- (Australia) Lleyton Hewitt
- (Australia) Luke Smith
- (Australia) Todd Woodbridge

The following players received entry from the qualifying draw:

- (Germany) Björn Phau
- (Belgium) Xavier Malisse
- (Australia) Alun Jones
- (Germany) Michael Kohlmann
