= 1999 AAPT Championships – Singles =

Singles
- 1999 AAPT Championships

Final
- Champion: (Sweden) Thomas Enqvist
- Runner-up: (Australia) Lleyton Hewitt
- Score: 4–6, 6–1, 6–2

Details
- Draw: 32
- Seeds: 8

Events
Singles	Doubles
- AAPT Championships

Thomas Enqvist defeated Lleyton Hewitt 4–6, 6–1, 6–2 to secure the title.

== Seeds ==
1. (Australia) Patrick Rafter (second round)
2. (Sweden) Thomas Enqvist (champion)
3. (Brazil) Gustavo Kuerten (second round)
4. (Australia) Jason Stoltenberg (semifinals)
5. (Zimbabwe) Byron Black (quarterfinals)
6. (United States) Michael Chang (second round)
7. (Germany) Nicolas Kiefer (first round)
8. (Argentina) Mariano Puerta (first round)

== Draw ==
Key

- Q = Qualifier
- WC = Wild card
- LL = Lucky loser
- Alt = Alternate
- ITF = ITF entry
- PR = Protected ranking
- SR = Special ranking
- SE = Special exempt
- JE = Junior exempt
- JR = Junior Accelerator Programme entrant
- CO = College Accelerator Programme entrant
- NG = Next Gen Accelerator Program entrant
- w/o = Walkover
- r = Retired
- d = Defaulted

=== Finals ===
Semifinals
WC	(Australia) Lleyton Hewitt	6	6
4	(Australia) Jason Stoltenberg	1	3
(Australia) Scott Draper	3	5
2	(Sweden) Thomas Enqvist	6	7

Final
WC	(Australia) Lleyton Hewitt	6	1	2
2	(Sweden) Thomas Enqvist	4	6	6

=== Section 1 ===
First round
1	(Australia) P Rafter	6	6
Q	(Japan) T Suzuki	3	0
(Czech Republic) S Doseděl	7	6
(United States) J Courier	5	3
(Czech Republic) J Novák	6	6
(Australia) A Ilie	2	1
WC	(Australia) L Hewitt	7	6
7	(Germany) N Kiefer	5	4
4	(Australia) J Stoltenberg	6	6
(France) A Di Pasquale	1	4
(Australia) T Woodbridge	4	2
(Italy) G Pozzi	6	6
(Romania) A Pavel	6	6
Q	(Sweden) M Tillström	3	3
(United States) V Spadea	6	6^{6}	2
5	(Zimbabwe) B Black	1	7^{8}	6

Second round
1	(Australia) P Rafter	5	4
(Czech Republic) S Doseděl	7	6
(Czech Republic) J Novák	6^{2}	6	4
WC	(Australia) L Hewitt	7^{7}	2	6
4	(Australia) J Stoltenberg	6	6
(Italy) G Pozzi	3	2
(Romania) A Pavel	3	2
5	(Zimbabwe) B Black	6	6

Quarterfinals
(Czech Republic) S Doseděl	6	4	2
WC	(Australia) L Hewitt	4	6	6
4	(Australia) J Stoltenberg	6	6
5	(Zimbabwe) B Black	3	2

Semifinals
WC	(Australia) L Hewitt	6	6
4	(Australia) J Stoltenberg	1	3

=== Section 2 ===
First round
6	(United States) M Chang	6	3	6
Q	(France) S Grosjean	3	6	3
(Australia) S Draper	3	7^{8}	6
(United States) J Gimelstob	6	6^{6}	3
WC	(Australia) M Tebbutt	6	3	6
(Canada) S Lareau	3	6	1
(France) J Golmard	5	1
3	(Brazil) G Kuerten	7	6
8	(Argentina) M Puerta	6	1	5
(Slovakia) D Hrbatý	4	6	7
Q	(Germany) O Gross	6	6
WC	(Australia) M Draper	2	0
(Romania) A Voinea	6^{0}	6	2
(Germany) D Prinosil	7^{7}	4	6
(Australia) M Woodforde	6	4	4
2	(Sweden) T Enqvist	0	6	6

Second round
6	(United States) M Chang	3	6^{6}
(Australia) S Draper	6	7^{8}
WC	(Australia) M Tebbutt	6^{2}	7^{7}	7^{7}
3	(Brazil) G Kuerten	7^{7}	6^{5}	6^{3}
(Slovakia) D Hrbatý	w/o
Q	(Germany) O Gross
(Germany) D Prinosil	2	3
2	(Sweden) T Enqvist	6	6

Quarterfinals
(Australia) S Draper	6^{7}	6	7^{7}
WC	(Australia) M Tebbutt	7^{9}	4	6^{5}
(Slovakia) D Hrbatý	2	4
2	(Sweden) T Enqvist	6	6

Semifinals
(Australia) S Draper	3	5
2	(Sweden) T Enqvist	6	7
