= ATP Finals appearances =

This list shows the appearances of all participants in the men's tennis ATP Finals singles since their inception as the Pepsi-Cola Masters in 1970. The tournament is currently held in Pala Alpitour in Turin, Italy.

== Qualification ==
The criteria to qualify for the ATP Finals are as follows:

1. Players and teams who finish the season ranked in the top seven in the ATP race automatically qualify.
2. The eighth spot is reserved for a player or team who won a major in the season and is ranked from eighth to twentieth. Goran Ivanišević in 2001, Albert Costa in 2002, Gastón Gaudio in 2004, and Marin Čilić in 2014 are the singles players who have qualified due to their major title despite not ending in the top eight in the ATP race.
3. If more than one player or team won a Grand Slam event in the season and are ranked from eighth to twentieth, then whoever is highest-ranked is awarded the eighth spot; whoever is second highest-ranked is made first alternate.
4. If there is no player who won a major in the season and is ranked from eighth to twentieth, then the eight spot is awarded to the player ranked eighth.

Two alternates also attend the ATP Finals. If the first alternate has already been selected according to (3) mentioned above, then the second alternate is the highest-ranked player who has not otherwise qualified for the event. If both alternate spots are available, they are awarded to the two highest-ranked players who did not otherwise qualify for the event.

An alternate can replace a player who withdraws before the round-robin stage is over, so long as the player who withdraws still has at least one round-robin match left to play. When an alternate enters the competition, his results are considered separately, i.e. the alternate does not inherit the results of the player he is replacing. If an alternate's round-robin results qualify him for the semifinals, then he may continue into the single-elimination rounds.

=== Format ===
Unlike other events on the ATP Tour, the ATP Finals is not a straightforward single-elimination tournament. The eight players and teams are divided into two groups of four and each play three round-robin matches against the others in their group. After the round-robin stage, the top two performers in each group advance to the semifinals in a knock-out stage. The two winners of the semifinals play a final to determine the champion. In this format, it is theoretically possible to advance to the semifinals with two round-robin losses, but no player in the history of the singles tournament has won the title after losing more than one round-robin match.

To create the groups, the eight players and teams are seeded according to rank. The first and second seeds are placed in Group A and Group B, respectively. The remaining seeds are drawn in pairs (third and fourth, fifth and sixth, seventh and eighth); the first of the pair to be drawn goes to Group A and the other to Group B, and so on.

The format described above has been in place for all editions of the tournament except the following years:

- 1970–71: All round robin (no groups), no semifinals or finals, the winner was decided based on round-robin standings.
- 1982–84: 12-player three-round single-elimination tournament (no round robin), the top four seeds received byes in the first round.
- 1985: 16-player four-round single-elimination tournament (no round robin), no byes.

== ATP Finals Singles appearances ==
Key

Current format

- W = winner;
- F = runner-up;
- SF = lost in semi-finals (1972–present);
- RR = lost in Round Robin group stage (1972–1981, 1986–present);
- A+ = Alternate (played from the beginning = qualified player withdrew before the tournament);
- A− = Alternate (did not play from the beginning; 1996–present);
- R = withdrew during the tournament (1996–present).

Older format

- QF = lost in quarter-finals (1982–1985);
- R16 = lost in 1st round/Round of 16 (1982–1985);
- 3rd–7th = standings in the RR group (1970–1971);

Note

When there are more than eight players listed for any year since 1986, it is usually due to withdrawal by one or more players because of injury. When a player withdraws early in the tournament, his place is filled by the next-highest qualifier.

Participants are listed in order of (1) number of appearances, (2) best result(s) (bolded years for wins, underlined years for other best results), (3) year of first appearance, and (4) alphabetical order if still tied. Active players are indicated in bold.

Player	# Played	Best result	Years Year(s) of best result underlined (Wins in bold)	Qualified but not played	W–L
(Switzerland) Roger Federer	17	**W**	2002, **2003**, **2004**, 2005, **2006**, **2007**, 2008, 2009, **2010**, **2011**, 2012, 2013, 2014, 2015, 2017, 2018, 2019	2020	59–17
**(Serbia) Novak Djokovic**	16	**W**	2007, **2008**, 2009, 2010, 2011, **2012**, **2013**, **2014**, **2015**, 2016, 2018, 2019, 2020, 2021, **2022**, **2023**	2024, 2025	50–18
(United States) Andre Agassi	13	**W**	1988, 1989, **1990**, 1991, 1994, 1996(R), 1998(R), 1999, 2000, 2001, 2002(R), 2003, 2005(R)	1995	22–20
(Czechoslovakia) Ivan Lendl	12	**W**	1980, **1981**, **1982**, 1983, 1984, **1985**, **1986**, **1987**, 1988, 1989, 1990, 1991	1992	39–10
(United States) Jimmy Connors	11	**W**	1972, 1973, **1977**, 1978, 1979, 1980, 1981, 1982, 1983, 1984, 1987	1974, 1975, 1976, 1985, 1988	18–17
(Germany) Boris Becker	11	**W**	1985, 1986, 1987, **1988**, 1989, 1990, 1991, **1992**, 1994, **1995**, 1996	–	36–13
(United States) Pete Sampras	11	**W**	1990, **1991**, 1992, 1993, **1994**, 1995, **1996**, **1997**, 1998, **1999**, 2000	–	35–14
(Spain) Rafael Nadal	11	F	2006, 2007, 2009, 2010, 2011, 2013, 2015, 2017(R), 2019, 2020, 2022	2005, 2008, 2012, 2014, 2016, 2018	21–18
(United States) John McEnroe	9	**W**	**1978**, 1979, 1980, 1981, 1982, **1983**, **1984**, 1985, 1989	–	19–11
(Sweden) Stefan Edberg	9	**W**	1985, 1986, 1987, 1988, **1989**, 1990, 1992, 1993, 1994	1991	18–14
**(Germany) Alexander Zverev**	9	**W**	2017, **2018**, 2019, 2020, **2021**, 2023, 2024, 2025, 2026	–	22–13
(Argentina) Guillermo Vilas	8	**W**	**1974**, 1975, 1976, 1977, 1979, 1980, 1981, 1982	1978	16–11
(United Kingdom) Andy Murray	8	**W**	2008, 2009, 2010, 2011(R), 2012, 2014, 2015, **2016**	2013	16–11
**(Russia) Daniil Medvedev**	7	**W**	2019, **2020**, 2021, 2022^{†}, 2023^{†}, 2024^{†}, 2026^{†}	–	14–13
(Sweden) Mats Wilander	7	F	1982, 1983, 1984, 1985, 1986, 1987, 1988	–	9–10
(United States) Michael Chang	7	F	1989, 1992, 1993, 1994, 1995, 1996, 1997	–	7–16
(Russia) Yevgeny Kafelnikov	7	F	1995, 1996, 1997, 1998(A+), 1999, 2000, 2001	–	11–14
(Spain) David Ferrer	7	F	2007, 2010, 2011, 2012, 2013, 2014(A−), 2015	–	8–14
(Spain) Manuel Orantes	6	**W**	1972, 1973, 1974, 1975, **1976**, 1977	–	8–12
(United States) Harold Solomon	6	SF	1974, 1975(A+), 1976, 1978, 1979, 1980	–	4–15
(United States) Andy Roddick	6	SF	2003, 2004, 2006, 2007, 2008(R), 2010	2005, 2009	8–11
(Czech Republic) Tomáš Berdych	6	SF	2010, 2011, 2012, 2013, 2014, 2015	–	6–13
(Romania) Ilie Năstase	5	**W**	**1971**, **1972**, **1973**, 1974, **1975**	–	22–3
(Sweden) Björn Borg	5	**W**	1974, 1975, 1977, **1979**, **1980**	1978, 1981	16–6
(Russia) Nikolay Davydenko	5	**W**	2005, 2006, 2007, 2008, **2009**	–	12–8
**(Greece) Stefanos Tsitsipas**	5	**W**	**2019**, 2020, 2021(R), 2022, 2023(R)	–	6–8
(Spain) Carlos Moyà	5	F	1997, 1998, 2002, 2003, 2004	–	10–9
(Austria) Dominic Thiem	5	F	2016(A+), 2017, 2018, 2019, 2020	–	9–10
(Mexico) Raúl Ramírez	5	SF	1974, 1975, 1976, 1977, 1978	–	4–12
(Ecuador) Andrés Gómez	5	SF	1982, 1983, 1985(A+), 1986, 1990	1984	5–8
(Croatia) Goran Ivanišević	5	SF	1992, 1993, 1994, 1996, 2001	–	8–10
**(Russia) Andrey Rublev**	5	SF	2020, 2021, 2022^{†}, 2023^{†}, 2024^{†}	–	4–12
(United States) Stan Smith	4	**W**	**1970**, 1971, 1972, 1973	–	13–6
(Australia) Lleyton Hewitt	4	**W**	2000, **2001**, **2002**, 2004	2005	13–5
**(Italy) Jannik Sinner**	4	**W**	2021(A−), 2023, **2024**, **2025**	2026	15–2
**(Spain) Carlos Alcaraz**	4	**W**	2023, 2024, 2025, **2026**	2022	12–5
(United States) Vitas Gerulaitis	4	F	1979, 1981(A+), 1982, 1984	–	6–6
(United States) Jim Courier	4	F	1991, 1992, 1993, 1995	–	7–9
(Argentina) Juan Martín del Potro	4	F	2008, 2009, 2012, 2013	2018	7–8
(Czechoslovakia) Jan Kodeš	4	4th	1970(A+), 1971, 1972, 1973	–	5–12
(Switzerland) Stan Wawrinka	4	SF	2013, 2014, 2015, 2016	2017	7–8
(Japan) Kei Nishikori	4	SF	2014, 2015, 2016, 2018(A+)	–	5–9
(Argentina) José Luis Clerc	4	QF	1980, 1981, 1982, 1983	–	2–6
(United States) Johan Kriek	4	QF	1982, 1983, 1984, 1985	–	4–4
(France) Yannick Noah	4	QF	1982, 1983, 1985, 1986	–	1–6
(United States) Roscoe Tanner	4	RR	1976, 1977, 1979, 1981	–	3–9
(Austria) Thomas Muster	4	RR	1990, 1995, 1996, 1997(A−)	–	2–8
**(Croatia) Marin Čilić**	4	RR	2014, 2016, 2017, 2018	–	2–10
(Brazil) Gustavo Kuerten	3	**W**	1999, **2000**, 2001	–	5–6
(Argentina) David Nalbandian	3	**W**	2003, **2005**(A+), 2006	–	6–6
(United States) Arthur Ashe	3	F	1970, 1975, 1978(A+)	–	8–5
(Spain) Juan Carlos Ferrero	3	F	2001, 2002, 2003	–	5–7
(France) Jo-Wilfried Tsonga	3	F	2008, 2011, 2012	–	4–7
**(Norway) Casper Ruud**	3	F	2021, 2022, 2024	–	7–6
**(United States) Taylor Fritz**	3	F	2022(A+), 2024, 2025	–	6–6
(United States) Eddie Dibbs	3	SF	1976, 1977, 1978	–	3–7
(United States) Brian Gottfried	3	SF	1976(A+), 1977, 1978	–	8–3
(United States) Eliot Teltscher	3	SF	1981, 1983, 1984	–	3–4
(United States) Brad Gilbert	3	SF	1985, 1987, 1989	–	4–5
(Spain) Sergi Bruguera	3	SF	1993, 1994, 1997(R)	–	2–7
(Sweden) Thomas Enqvist	3	SF	1995, 1996(A−), 1999	–	5–4
(United Kingdom) Tim Henman	3	SF	1997(A−), 1998(A+), 2004	–	4–4
(Russia) Marat Safin	3	SF	2000, 2002, 2004	2005	4–7
(Spain) José Higueras	3	QF	1979, 1982, 1983	–	1–5
(Czechoslovakia) Tomáš Šmíd	3	QF	1983, 1984, 1985	–	1–3
(Sweden) Joakim Nyström	3	QF	1984, 1985, 1986	–	2–4
(France) Henri Leconte	3	R16/RR	1985, 1986, 1988	–	1–6
(Argentina) Guillermo Coria	3	RR	2003, 2004, 2005	–	1–8
(Germany) Michael Stich	2	**W**	1991, **1993**	–	5–3
(Spain) Àlex Corretja	2	**W**	**1998**, 2000	–	5–3
(Belgium) David Goffin	2	F	2016(A−), 2017	–	3–3
(United States) Tom Gorman	2	SF	1972, 1973	–	3–4
(Australia) John Newcombe	2	SF	1973, 1974(A+)	1971	4–4
(Sweden) Anders Järryd	2	SF	1984, 1985	–	3–2
(Netherlands) Richard Krajicek	2	SF	1992(A+), 1996	1998	3–4
(Argentina) Gastón Gaudio	2	SF	2004, 2005(A+)	–	2–5
(Sweden) Robin Söderling	2	SF	2009(A+), 2010	–	3–4
(Canada) Milos Raonic	2	SF	2014(A+, R), 2016	–	2–4
**(Canada) Félix Auger-Aliassime**	2	SF	2022, 2025	–	3–4
**(Australia) Alex de Minaur**	2	SF	2024(A+), 2025	–	1–6
**(United States) Ben Shelton**	2	SF	2025, 2026	–	2–5
(Socialist Federal Republic of Yugoslavia) Željko Franulović	2	5th	1970, 1971	–	2–9
(United States) Tim Mayotte	2	QF	1985, 1988	–	1–4
(United States) Aaron Krickstein	2	R16/RR	1984(A+), 1989	–	1–3
(Australia) Patrick Rafter	2	RR	1997, 2001	1998	2–4
(United Kingdom) Greg Rusedski	2	RR	1997(R), 1998(A−)	–	2–2
(Spain) Albert Costa	2	RR	1998(A−), 2002	–	1–4
(Chile) Fernando González	2	RR	2005(A−), 2007	–	2–3
(Croatia) Ivan Ljubičić	2	RR	2005(A+), 2006	–	2–4
(France) Richard Gasquet	2	RR	2007, 2013(A+)	–	1–5
(Serbia) Janko Tipsarević	2	RR	2011(A−), 2012(A+)	–	1–4
**(Italy) Matteo Berrettini**	2	RR	2019, 2021(R)	–	1–3
**(Poland) Hubert Hurkacz**	2	RR	2021, 2023(A−)	–	0–4
**(Bulgaria) Grigor Dimitrov**	1	**W**	**2017**	–	5–0
(Australia) Rod Laver	1	F	1970	–	4–1
(Netherlands) Tom Okker	1	F	1973	–	4–1
(Poland) Wojciech Fibak	1	F	1976	–	3–2
(France) Sébastien Grosjean	1	F	2001	–	3–2
(United States) James Blake	1	F	2006	–	3–2
(Australia) Ken Rosewall	1	3rd	1970	1971	3–2
(United States) Cliff Richey	1	3rd	1971	1970	3–3
(United States) Gene Mayer	1	SF	1980	–	3–1
(Switzerland) Jakob Hlasek	1	SF	1988(A+)	–	3–1
(Ukraine) Andrei Medvedev	1	SF	1993	–	2–2
(Sweden) Jonas Björkman	1	SF	1997	–	2–2
(Germany) Nicolas Kiefer	1	SF	1999	–	2–2
(Germany) Rainer Schüttler	1	SF	2003	–	2–2
(France) Gilles Simon	1	SF	2008(A+)	–	2–2
(United States) Jack Sock	1	SF	2017(A+)	–	2–2
(South Africa) Kevin Anderson	1	SF	2018	–	2–2
(France) Pierre Barthès	1	5th	1971(A+)	–	3–2
(United States) Clark Graebner	1	7th	1971(A+)	–	1–5
(Spain) Andrés Gimeno	1	RR	1972	–	0–3
(South Africa) Bob Hewitt	1	RR	1972	–	0–3
(New Zealand) Onny Parun	1	RR	1974	–	0–3
(Italy) Adriano Panatta	1	RR	1975	–	0–3
(Italy) Corrado Barazzutti	1	RR	1978(A+)	–	0–3
(United States) Steve Denton	1	R16	1982	–	0–1
(United States) Jimmy Arias	1	R16	1983	–	0–1
(Sweden) Henrik Sundström	1	R16	1984	–	0–1
(United States) Paul Annacone	1	R16	1985	–	0–1
(United States) Scott Davis	1	R16	1985(A+)	–	0–1
(Australia) Pat Cash	1	RR	1987	–	1–2
(Czechoslovakia) Miloslav Mečíř	1	RR	1987	1985	0–3
(Spain) Emilio Sánchez	1	RR	1990	–	0–3
(France) Guy Forget	1	RR	1991	–	1–2
(Czechoslovakia) Karel Nováček	1	RR	1991(A+)	–	0–3
(Czechoslovakia) Petr Korda	1	RR	1992	–	0–3
(Spain) Alberto Berasategui	1	RR	1994	–	0–3
(South Africa) Wayne Ferreira	1	RR	1995(A+)	–	2–1
(Slovakia) Karol Kučera	1	RR	1998	–	0–3
(Chile) Marcelo Ríos	1	RR	1998(R)	–	0–1
(Ecuador) Nicolás Lapentti	1	RR	1999	–	0–3
(United States) Todd Martin	1	RR	1999	–	1–2
(Sweden) Magnus Norman	1	RR	2000	–	0–3
(Sweden) Thomas Johansson	1	RR	2002(A−)	–	0–1
(Czech Republic) Jiří Novák	1	RR	2002	–	1–2
(Argentina) ~~Mariano Puerta~~	1	~~RR~~	~~2005(A+)~~^{‡}	–	~~0–3~~
(Spain) Tommy Robredo	1	RR	2006	–	1–2
(Czech Republic) Radek Štěpánek	1	RR	2008(A−)	–	0–2
(Spain) Fernando Verdasco	1	RR	2009	–	0–3
(United States) Mardy Fish	1	RR	2011	–	0–3
(France) Gaël Monfils	1	RR	2016(R)	–	0–2
**(Spain) Pablo Carreño Busta**	1	RR	2017(A−)	–	0–2
(United States) John Isner	1	RR	2018(A+)	–	0–3
(Argentina) Diego Schwartzman	1	RR	2020(A+)	–	0–3
**(United Kingdom) Cameron Norrie**	1	RR	2021(A−)	–	0–2
**(Denmark) Holger Rune**	1	RR	2023	–	1–2
**(Italy) Lorenzo Musetti**	1	RR	2025(A+)	–	1–2
**(Italy) Flavio Cobolli**	1	RR	2026	–	0–3
**(France) Arthur Fils**	1	RR	2026	–	1–2
**(Spain) Rafael Jódar**	1	RR	2026(A+)	–	0–3
**(United States) Frances Tiafoe**	1	RR	2026	–	1–2

† Player competed under no flag due to the Russian invasion of Ukraine.
‡ Results later disqualified due to doping violation

== ATP Finals Doubles appearances ==
Key

Current format

- W = winner;
- F = runner-up;
- SF = lost in semi-finals (1976–present);
- RR = lost in Round Robin group stage (1970, 1975, 1986–present);
- A+ = Alternate (played from the beginning = qualified player withdrew before the tournament);
- A− = Alternate (did not play from the beginning; 1996–present);
- R = withdrew during the tournament (1996–present).

Older format

- QF = lost in quarter-finals (1982–1985);
- 5th–8th = fifth or seventh place playoff (1986–1989);

Note

When there are more than eight players listed for any year since 1995, it is usually due to withdrawal by one or more players because of injury. When a player withdraws early in the tournament, his place is filled by the next-highest qualifier. In 1971 to 1974 and in 2002, the tournament of doubles wasn't held.

Participants are listed in order of (1) number of appearances, (2) best result(s) (bolded years for wins, underlined years for other best results), (3) year of first appearance, and (4) alphabetical order if still tied. Active players are indicated in bold.

Player	# Played	Best result	Years Year(s) of best result underlined (Wins in bold)	Qualified but not played	W–L
(United States) Mike Bryan	16	**W**	2001, **2003**, **2004**, 2005, 2006, 2008, **2009**, 2010, 2011, 2012, 2013, **2014**, 2015, 2016, 2017, **2018**	2007, 2019	42–25
(Canada) Daniel Nestor	15	**W**	1995, 1996, 1997, 1998, 2003, 2004, 2005, 2006, **2007**, **2008**, 2009, **2010**, **2011**, 2012, 2014	–	34–23
(United States) Bob Bryan	15	**W**	2001, **2003**, **2004**, 2005, 2006, 2008, **2009**, 2010, 2011, 2012, 2013, **2014**, 2015, 2016, 2017	2007, 2018, 2019	38–24
(India) Leander Paes	14	F	1997, 1998, 1999, 2000, 2001, 2005, 2006, 2007, 2008, 2009, 2010, 2011, 2012, 2013	2003	23–30
(The Bahamas) Mark Knowles	12	**W**	1995, 1996, 1997, 1998, 2001, 2003, 2004, 2005, 2006, **2007**, 2008, 2009	–	22–22
(India) Mahesh Bhupathi	12	F	1997, 1998, 1999, 2000, 2001, 2003, 2004, 2008, 2009, 2010, 2011, 2012	–	24–23
(Australia) Todd Woodbridge	11	**W**	1991, **1992**, 1993, 1994, 1995, **1996**, 1997, 1998, 1999, 2003, 2004	–	29–16
(Spain) **Marcel Granollers**	11	**W**	**2012**, 2013, 2014, 2017, 2020, 2021, 2022, 2023, 2024, 2025, 2026	–	16–22
(United States) Rick Leach	10	**W**	**1988**, 1989, 1990, 1992, 1995, **1997**, 1998, 1999, 2000, **2001**	–	19–19
(Belarus) Max Mirnyi	10	**W**	2003, 2004, 2005, **2006**, 2007, 2009, 2010, **2011**, 2012, 2016	–	20–18
(Australia) Mark Woodforde	9	**W**	1991, **1992**, 1993, 1994, 1995, **1996**, 1997, 1998, 1999	–	25–13
(Croatia) Ivan Dodig	9	F	2013, 2014, 2015, 2016, 2017, 2019(A+), 2021, 2022, 2023	–	12–18
(United States) Peter Fleming	8	**W**	**1978, 1979, 1980, 1981, 1982, 1983, 1984**, 1987	–	16–2
(Sweden) Anders Järryd	8	**W**	1983, **1985**, **1986**, 1987, 1988, 1989, **1991**, 1992	–	25–7
(Netherlands) Paul Haarhuis	8	**W**	**1993**, 1994, 1995, 1996, 1997, **1998**, 1999, 2000	–	22–10
(Sweden) Jonas Björkman	8	**W**	**1994**, 1996, 2003, 2004, 2005, **2006**, 2007, 2008	–	16–13
(Serbia and Montenegro) / (Serbia) Nenad Zimonjić	8	**W**	2005, 2006, **2008**, 2009, **2010**, 2011, 2014, 2015	–	16–14
(Spain) Sergio Casal	8	F	1985, 1986, 1987, 1988, 1990, 1992, 1993, 1994	–	13–16
(Spain) Emilio Sánchez	8	F	1985, 1986, 1987, 1988, 1990, 1992, 1993, 1994	–	13–16
(Brazil) **Marcelo Melo**	8	F	2013, 2014, 2015, 2016, 2017, 2018, 2019, 2020	–	16–15
(Croatia) **Mate Pavić**	8	F	2017(A−), 2018, 2020, 2021, 2022, 2024, 2025, 2026	–	18–11
(Czechoslovakia) / (Czech Republic) Cyril Suk	8	SF	1991, 1992, 1993, 1994, 1995, 1998, 2003, 2004	–	3–22
(United States) John McEnroe	7	**W**	**1978, 1979, 1980, 1981, 1982, 1983, 1984**	–	14–0
(Romania) Horia Tecău	7	**W**	2011, 2012, 2014, **2015**, 2017, 2019, 2021	–	9–14
(Netherlands) Jean-Julien Rojer	7	**W**	2012, 2013, 2014, **2015**, 2017, 2019, 2022	–	7–16
(United States) Rajeev Ram	7	**W**	2016, 2017(A−), 2019, 2020, 2021, **2022**, **2023**	–	20–8
(Poland) Marcin Matkowski	7	F	2006, 2008(A+), 2009, 2010, 2011, 2013, 2015	–	10–15
(Poland) Łukasz Kubot	7	F	2009, 2010, 2014, 2017, 2018, 2019, 2020	–	13–12
(Argentina) **Horacio Zeballos**	7	F	2020, 2021, 2022, 2023, 2024, 2025, 2026	–	10–15
(Brazil) Bruno Soares	7	SF	2013, 2014, 2016, 2017, 2018, 2020, 2021	–	14–12
(United States) Sherwood Stewart	6	**W**	1975, **1976**, 1979, 1982, 1983, 1984	–	7–5
(Czechoslovakia) Tomáš Šmíd	6	**W**	1982, 1983, 1984, 1985, 1986, **1987**	–	11–6
(Netherlands) Jacco Eltingh	6	**W**	**1993**, 1994, 1995, 1996, 1997, **1998**	–	20–6
(Canada) Grant Connell	6	**W**	1990, 1991, 1993, 1994, **1995**, 1996	–	13–11
(France) **Pierre-Hugues Herbert**	6	**W**	2015, 2016, 2017, 2018, **2019**, **2021**	–	14–9
(France) Nicolas Mahut	6	**W**	2015, 2016, 2017, 2018, **2019**, **2021**	–	14–9
(United Kingdom) Joe Salisbury	6	**W**	2019, 2020, 2021, **2022**, **2023**, 2025	–	21–6
(Germany) **Kevin Krawietz**	6	**W**	2019, 2020, 2021, **2024**, 2025, 2026	–	11–10
(Zimbabwe) Kevin Ullyett	6	F	1999, 2004, 2005, 2006, 2007, 2008	–	13–10
(Poland) Mariusz Fyrstenberg	6	F	2006, 2008(A+), 2009, 2010, 2011, 2013	–	10–12
(Australia) John Fitzgerald	5	**W**	1986, 1988, 1989, **1991**, 1992	–	18–5
(United States) Patrick Galbraith	5	**W**	1991, 1993, 1994, **1995**, 1997	–	8–10
(South Africa) Ellis Ferreira	5	**W**	1997, 1998, 1999, 2000, **2001**	–	8–10
(Australia) **John Peers**	5	**W**	2015, **2016**, **2017**, 2018(A−), 2020	–	10–7
(Croatia) **Nikola Mektić**	5	**W**	2018, **2020**, 2021, 2022, 2024	–	11–8
(United States) Ken Flach	5	F	1984, 1985, 1987, 1988, 1991	–	10–7
(United States) Robert Seguso	5	F	1984, 1985, 1987, 1988, 1991	–	10–7
(India) Rohan Bopanna	5	F	2011, 2012, 2015, 2023, 2024	–	9–11
(United Kingdom) Jamie Murray	5	SF	2015, 2016, 2017, 2018, 2021	–	9–9
(United States) Stan Smith	4	**W**	**1970**, 1977, 1978, 1980	–	3–3
(United States) Alex O'Brien	4	**W**	1996, 1997, **1999**, 2000	–	10–7
(United States) Donald Johnson	4	**W**	1997, 1998, **2000**, 2001	–	8–8
(France) Fabrice Santoro	4	**W**	1998, 2003, **2005**, 2006	2004	10–7
(France) Michaël Llodra	4	**W**	2003, **2005**, 2007, 2011	2004	8–8
(Spain) Marc López	4	**W**	**2012**, 2013, 2014, 2016	–	7–7
(Netherlands) Wesley Koolhof	4	**W**	**2020**, 2022, 2023, 2024	–	8–7
(Finland) **Harri Heliövaara**	4	**W**	2022, 2024, **2025**, 2026	–	10–6
(Australia) Mark Edmondson	4	F	1979, 1983, 1984, 1985	–	2–4
(South Africa) Kevin Curren	4	F	1980, 1981, 1982, 1984	–	2–4
(United States) Steve Denton	4	F	1980, 1981, 1982, 1984	–	2–4
(Czechoslovakia) Pavel Složil	4	F	1982, 1983, 1984, 1985	–	4–4
(South Africa) Raven Klaasen	4	F	2016, 2017(A−), 2018, 2019	–	7–7
(New Zealand) Michael Venus	4	F	2017, 2018, 2019, 2020	–	7–8
(United Kingdom) **Neal Skupski**	4	F	2022, 2023, 2025, 2026	–	9–7
(El Salvador) **Marcelo Arévalo**	4	F	2022, 2024, 2025, 2026	–	9–7
(South Africa) Danie Visser	4	SF	1986, 1988, 1989, 1990	–	6–9
(Australia) Mark Kratzmann	4	SF	1989, 1990, 1992, 1993	–	5–9
(Czech Republic) Martin Damm	4	SF	2003, 2004, 2006, 2007	–	3–11
(Australia) Paul Hanley	4	SF	2003, 2005, 2006, 2007	–	8–6
(Italy) **Simone Bolelli**	4	SF	2015, 2024, 2025, 2026	–	4–9
(Netherlands) Tom Nijssen	4	RR	1991, 1992, 1993, 1994	–	0–12
(Czech Republic) Lukáš Dlouhý	4	RR	2007, 2008, 2009, 2010	–	2–10
(Austria) Oliver Marach	4	RR	2009, 2010, 2017(A−), 2018	–	5–5
(Sweden) Stefan Edberg	3	**W**	**1985**, **1986**, 1987	–	9–3
(United States) Jim Pugh	3	**W**	**1988**, 1989, 1990	–	6–6
(Canada) Sébastien Lareau	3	**W**	1996, 1997, **1999**	–	9–5
(South Africa) Piet Norval	3	**W**	1996(A−), 1999, **2000**	–	5–4
(Finland) Henri Kontinen	3	**W**	**2016**, **2017**, 2018(A−)	–	9–2
(United Kingdom) **Henry Patten**	3	**W**	2024, **2025**, 2026	–	8–4
(Germany) **Tim Pütz**	3	**W**	**2024**, 2025, 2026	–	8–4
(United States) Brian Gottfried	3	F	1975, 1976, 1977	–	1–5
(Mexico) Raúl Ramírez	3	F	1975, 1976, 1977	–	1–5
(United States) Bob Lutz	3	F	1977, 1978, 1980	–	1–3
(Zimbabwe) Wayne Black	3	F	1999, 2004, 2005	–	8–5
(Israel) Andy Ram	3	F	2006, 2007(A+), 2009	2008	5–6
(Austria) Jürgen Melzer	3	F	2010, 2011, 2020	–	5–6
(France) **Édouard Roger-Vasselin**	3	F	2014, 2020, 2023	–	7–6
(Switzerland) Heinz Günthardt	3	SF	1981, 1984, 1985	–	0–3
(Hungary) Balázs Taróczy	3	SF	1981, 1984, 1985	–	0–3
(United States) Paul Annacone	3	SF	1985, 1987, 1989	–	3–7
(South Africa) Christo van Rensburg	3	SF	1985, 1987, 1989	–	3–7
(United States) Scott Davis	3	SF	1987, 1990, 1991	–	3–8
(United States) David Pate	3	SF	1987, 1990, 1991	–	3–8
(South Africa) Pieter Aldrich	3	SF	1988, 1989, 1990	–	4–7
(United States) Todd Witsken	3	SF	1988, 1989, 1991	–	5–6
(Australia) David Macpherson	3	SF	1992, 1996, 1997(A−)	–	3–5
(South Africa) / (South Africa) David Adams	3	SF	1993, 1994, 1999	–	5–5
(Australia) Sandon Stolle	3	SF	1998, 1999, 2000	–	4–6
(United States) Jared Palmer	3	SF	1999, 2000, 2001	–	4–6
(Sweden) Robert Lindstedt	3	SF	2011, 2012, 2014	–	5–5
(Austria) Alexander Peya	3	SF	2013, 2014, 2018	–	3–6
(Colombia) Juan Sebastián Cabal	3	SF	2018, 2019, 2021	–	4–7
(Colombia) Robert Farah	3	SF	2018, 2019, 2021	–	4–7
(Italy) **Andrea Vavassori**	3	SF	2024, 2025, 2026	–	3–7
(South Africa) Wesley Moodie	3	RR	2005, 2008, 2010	–	3–6
(Pakistan) Aisam-ul-Haq Qureshi	3	RR	2011, 2012, 2013	–	0–9
(Spain) Juan Gisbert Sr.	2	**W**	**1975**, 1976	–	2–2
(Spain) Manuel Orantes	2	**W**	**1975**, 1976	–	2–2
(United States) Fred McNair	2	**W**	1975, **1976**	–	4–1
(South Africa) Bob Hewitt	2	**W**	**1977**, 1978	–	2–1
(South Africa) Frew McMillan	2	**W**	**1977**, 1978	–	2–1
(France) Guy Forget	2	**W**	1986, **1990**	–	9–1
(United States) Jim Grabb	2	**W**	**1989**, 1992	–	6–2
(United States) Jonathan Stark	2	**W**	1994, **1997**	–	5–3
(Poland) Wojciech Fibak	2	F	1978, 1979	–	2–2
(Netherlands) Tom Okker	2	F	1978, 1979	–	2–2
(Australia) Peter McNamara	2	F	1980, 1981	–	1–2
(Australia) Paul McNamee	2	F	1980, 1981	–	1–2
(Sweden) Joakim Nyström	2	F	1985, 1986	–	3–4
(Sweden) Mats Wilander	2	F	1985, 1986	–	3–4
(Sweden) Simon Aspelin	2	F	2000, 2007	–	5–4
(Czech Republic) Pavel Vízner	2	F	2001, 2007	–	5–3
(United States) Gary Donnelly	2	SF	1986, 1987	–	4–4
(Mexico) Jorge Lozano	2	SF	1988, 1989	–	4–4
(Australia) Darren Cahill	2	SF	1989, 1990	–	2–5
(Canada) Glenn Michibata	2	SF	1990, 1991	–	4–4
(Australia) Wally Masur	2	SF	1992, 1993	–	3–4
(Russia) / (Russia) Andrei Olhovskiy	2	SF	1993, 1994	–	5–3
(Zimbabwe) Byron Black	2	SF	1994, 1996	–	4–3
(United States) Trevor Kronemann	2	SF	1996, 1997(A−)	–	1–4
(United States) Francisco Montana	2	SF	1997, 1998	–	2–5
(Argentina) Gastón Etlis	2	SF	2003(A+), 2004(A+)	–	1–6
(Argentina) Martín Rodríguez	2	SF	2003(A+), 2004(A+)	–	1–6
(Czech Republic) Radek Štěpánek	2	SF	2012, 2013	–	4–3
(United Kingdom) **Lloyd Glasspool**	2	SF	2022, 2025	–	4–4
(Australia) **Matthew Ebden**	2	SF	2023, 2024	–	3–4
(United States) **Christian Harrison**	2	SF	2025, 2026	–	2–5
(United States) Tim Gullikson	2	QF	1982, 1983	–	0–2
(United States) Tom Gullikson	2	QF	1982, 1983	–	0–2
(Australia) Laurie Warder	2	RR	1987, 1991	–	1–6
(United Kingdom) Neil Broad	2	RR	1990, 1996(A−)	–	1–3
(United States) Luke Jensen	2	RR	1991, 1993	–	1–5
(Australia) Joshua Eagle	2	RR	1998(A−), 2000	–	2–2
(Australia) Andrew Florent	2	RR	1998(A−), 2000	–	2–2
(South Africa) John-Laffnie de Jager	2	RR	1999, 2001	–	0–5
(Australia) Wayne Arthurs	2	RR	2003, 2005	–	3–3
(Israel) Jonathan Erlich	2	RR	2006, 2007(A+)	2008	2–4
(Germany) Philipp Petzschner	2	RR	2010, 2011	–	2–4
(Germany) Andreas Mies	2	RR	2019, 2020	–	2–4
(Slovakia) Filip Polášek	2	RR	2019(A+), 2021	–	2–4
(United States) **Austin Krajicek**	2	RR	2022, 2023	–	1–5
(United States) Arthur Ashe	1	**W**	**1970**	–	2–0
(Czechoslovakia) Miloslav Mečíř	1	**W**	**1987**	–	5–0
(United States) Patrick McEnroe	1	**W**	**1989**	–	5–0
(Switzerland) Jakob Hlasek	1	**W**	**1990**	–	5–0
(Sweden) Jan Apell	1	**W**	**1994**	–	4–1
(Spain) David Marrero	1	**W**	**2013**	–	4–1
(Spain) Fernando Verdasco	1	**W**	**2013**	–	4–1
(United States) Jack Sock	1	**W**	**2018**	–	4–1
(France) **Théo Arribagé**	1	**W**	**2026**	–	4–1
(France) **Albano Olivetti**	1	**W**	**2026**	–	4–1
(United States) Ferdi Taygan	1	F	1982	–	1–1
(France) Yannick Noah	1	F	1986	–	4–1
(Czech Republic) Petr Pála	1	F	2001	–	3–2
(Austria) Julian Knowle	1	F	2007	–	3–2
(Romania) Florin Mergea	1	F	2015	–	3–2
(Egypt) Ismail El Shafei	1	SF	1976	–	0–1
(New Zealand) Brian Fairlie	1	SF	1976	–	0–1
(Australia) John Alexander	1	SF	1977	–	0–1
(Australia) Phil Dent	1	SF	1977	–	0–1
(Australia) John Marks	1	SF	1979	–	0–1
(United States) Marty Riessen	1	SF	1979	–	0–1
(United States) Victor Amaya	1	SF	1982	–	1–1
(United States) Hank Pfister	1	SF	1982	–	1–1
(Sweden) Hans Simonsson	1	SF	1983	–	0–1
(United States) Mike De Palmer	1	SF	1986	–	2–2
(Czech Republic) Daniel Vacek	1	SF	1995	–	2–2
(France) Olivier Delaître	1	SF	1998	–	2–2
(Sweden) Johan Landsberg	1	SF	2000	–	3–1
(United States) Brian MacPhie	1	SF	2001	–	2–2
(Uruguay) Pablo Cuevas	1	SF	2008	–	2–2
(Peru) Luis Horna	1	SF	2008	–	2–2
(Czech Republic) František Čermák	1	SF	2009	–	2–2
(Slovakia) Michal Mertiňák	1	SF	2009	–	2–2
(United Kingdom) Jonathan Marray	1	SF	2012	–	2–2
(Denmark) Frederik Nielsen	1	SF	2012	–	2–2
(France) Julien Benneteau	1	SF	2014	–	2–2
(United States) Ryan Harrison	1	SF	2017	–	3–1
(Mexico) **Santiago González**	1	SF	2023	–	2–2
(Australia) **Max Purcell**	1	SF	2024	–	2–2
(Australia) **Jordan Thompson**	1	SF	2024	–	2–2
(United Kingdom) **Julian Cash**	1	SF	2025	–	2–2
(South Africa) Christo Steyn	1	5th	1986	–	2–2
(New Zealand) Kelly Evernden	1	7th	1988	–	2–2
(United States) Johan Kriek	1	7th	1988	–	2–2
(United States) Jim Courier	1	7th	1989	–	1–3
(United States) Pete Sampras	1	7th	1989	–	1–3
(Chile) Hans Gildemeister	1	8th	1986	–	1–3
(Ecuador) Andrés Gómez	1	8th	1986	–	1–3
(Australia) Peter Doohan	1	8th	1987	–	0–4
(United States) Martin Davis	1	8th	1988	–	0–4
(Australia) Brad Drewett	1	8th	1988	–	0–4
(Brazil) Carlos Kirmayr	1	QF	1983	–	0–1
(Brazil) Cássio Motta	1	QF	1983	–	0–1
(Australia) Kim Warwick	1	QF	1985	–	0–1
(Czechoslovakia) Jan Kodeš	1	RR	1970	–	1–1
(Australia) Rod Laver	1	RR	1970	–	1–1
(Socialist Federal Republic of Yugoslavia) Željko Franulović	1	RR	1970	–	0–2
(Australia) Ken Rosewall	1	RR	1970	–	0–2
(Germany) Jürgen Fassbender	1	RR	1975	–	2–1
(Germany) Hans-Jürgen Pohmann	1	RR	1975	–	2–1
(South Africa) Gary Muller	1	RR	1990	–	1–2
(United States) Steve DeVries	1	RR	1992	–	1–2
(United States) Kelly Jones	1	RR	1992	–	1–2
(United States) Richey Reneberg	1	RR	1992	–	1–2
(United States) Murphy Jensen	1	RR	1993	–	1–2
(United States) Tommy Ho	1	RR	1995	–	1–2
(Argentina) Luis Lobo	1	RR	1995	–	1–2
(United States) Scott Melville	1	RR	1995	–	1–2
(Spain) Javier Sánchez	1	RR	1995	–	1–2
(New Zealand) Brett Steven	1	RR	1995	–	1–2
(Sweden) Nicklas Kulti	1	RR	1996	–	1–2
(Belgium) Libor Pimek	1	RR	1996	–	1–2
(South Africa) Byron Talbot	1	RR	1996	–	1–2
(Czech Republic) Jiří Novák	1	RR	1999(A−)	–	0–1
(Czech Republic) David Rikl	1	RR	1999(A−)	2003	0–1
(Brazil) Jaime Oncins	1	RR	2000	–	1–2
(Argentina) Daniel Orsanic	1	RR	2000	–	1–2
(South Africa) Chris Haggard	1	RR	2001	–	0–3
(South Africa) Robbie Koenig	1	RR	2001	–	0–3
(Belgium) Tom Vanhoudt	1	RR	2001	–	0–3
(Belgium) Xavier Malisse	1	RR	2004	–	1–2
(Belgium) Olivier Rochus	1	RR	2004	–	1–2
(Australia) Stephen Huss	1	RR	2005	–	1–2
(France) Arnaud Clément	1	RR	2007	–	1–2
(South Africa) Jeff Coetzee	1	RR	2008	–	1–2
(Belgium) Dick Norman	1	RR	2010	–	1–2
(Italy) Fabio Fognini	1	RR	2015	–	1–2
(Philippines) Treat Huey	1	RR	2016	–	0–3
(Spain) Feliciano López	1	RR	2016	–	1–2
(Australia) **Thanasi Kokkinakis**	1	RR	2022	–	1–2
(Australia) **Nick Kyrgios**	1	RR	2022	–	1–2
(Argentina) **Máximo González**	1	RR	2023	–	0–3
(Australia) **Rinky Hijikata**	1	RR	2023	–	0–3
(Australia) **Jason Kubler**	1	RR	2023	–	0–3
(Argentina) **Andrés Molteni**	1	RR	2023	–	0–3
(United States) **Evan King**	1	RR	2025	–	0–3
(Brazil) **Orlando Luz**	1	RR	2026	–	0–3
(Brazil) **Rafael Matos**	1	RR	2026	–	0–3
