= 1972 Commercial Union Assurance Masters – Singles =

Singles
- 1972 Commercial Union Assurance Masters

Final
- Champion: (Romania) Ilie Năstase
- Runner-up: (United States) Stan Smith
- Score: 6–3, 6–2, 3–6, 2–6, 6–3

Details
- Draw: 8S

Events
Singles
← 1971 ·	ATP Finals	· 1973 →

Defending champion Ilie Năstase successfully defended his title, defeating Stan Smith in the final, 6–3, 6–2, 3–6, 2–6, 6–3 to win the singles title at the 1972 Commercial Union Assurance Masters.

== Draw ==
=== Key ===
- Q = Qualifier
- WC = Wild card
- LL = Lucky loser
- Alt = Alternate
- SE = Special exempt
- PR = Protected ranking
- ITF = ITF entry
- JE = Junior exempt
- w/o = Walkover
- r = Retired
- d = Defaulted
- SR = Special ranking

=== Finals ===
Semifinals
(Romania) Ilie Năstase	6	6	6
(United States) Jimmy Connors	2	3	2
(United States) Tom Gorman	7	5	7	5^{r}
(United States) Stan Smith	6	7	5	4

Final
(Romania) Ilie Năstase	6	6	3	2	6
(United States) Stan Smith	3	2	6	6	3

=== Group A ===
	(Romania) Năstase	(United States) Gorman	(Spain) Orantes	(South Africa) Hewitt	RR; W–L	Set; W–L	Game; W–L	Standings
(Romania) Ilie Năstase		6–2, 6–3	6–3, 6–4	6–4, 6–4	3–0	6–0	36–20	1
(United States) Tom Gorman	2–6, 3–6		6–3, 6–4	6–4, 6–2	2–1	4–2	29–25	2
(Spain) Manuel Orantes	3–6, 4–6	3–6, 4–6		6–3, 6–3	1–2	2–4	26–30	3
(South Africa) Bob Hewitt	4–6, 4–6	3–6, 4–6	3–6, 3–6		0–3	0–6	20–36	4

Standings are determined by: 1. number of wins; 2. number of matches; 3. in two-players-ties, head-to-head records; 4. in three-players-ties, percentage of sets won, or of games won; 5. steering-committee decision.

=== Group B ===
	(United States) Smith	(United States) Connors	(Czechoslovakia) Kodeš	(Spain) Gimeno	RR; W–L	Set; W–L	Game; W–L	Standings
(United States) Stan Smith		3–6, 6–2, 7–5	6–1, 6–0	6–2, 3–6, 6–3	3–0	6–2	43–25	1
(United States) Jimmy Connors	6–3, 2–6, 5–7		6–4, 6–3	6–3, 6–7, 6–2	2–1	5–3	43–35	2
(Czechoslovakia) Jan Kodeš	1–6, 0–6	4–6, 3–6		6–3, 6–2	1–2	2–4	20–29	3
(Spain) Andrés Gimeno	2–6, 6–3, 3–6	3–6, 7–6, 2–6	3–6, 2–6		0–3	2–6	28–45	4

Standings are determined by: 1. number of wins; 2. number of matches; 3. in two-players-ties, head-to-head records; 4. in three-players-ties, percentage of sets won, or of games won; 5. steering-committee decision.

== See also ==
- ATP World Tour Finals appearances
