= 1975 Commercial Union Assurance Masters – Doubles =

Doubles
- 1975 Commercial Union Assurance Masters

Final
- Champions: (Spain) Juan Gisbert Sr. (Spain) Manuel Orantes
- Runners-up: (West Germany) Jürgen Fassbender (West Germany) Hans-Jürgen Pohmann

Events
Singles	Doubles
← 1970 ·	Commercial Union Assurance Masters	· 1976 →

Juan Gisbert Sr. and Manuel Orantes won the doubles tennis title at the 1975 Masters Grand Prix, which was played in a round-robin format.

Arthur Ashe and Stan Smith were the reigning champions from when the tournament was last held in 1970, but neither qualified this year.

== Draw ==
	(Spain) Gisbert (Spain) Orantes	(West Germany) Fassbender (West Germany) Pohmann	(United States) Stewart (United States) McNair	(United States) Gottfried (Mexico) Ramírez	RR W–L	Set W–L	Game W–L	Standings
(Spain) Juan Gisbert Sr. (Spain) Manuel Orantes		7–5, 6–1	0–6, 3–6	6–3, 6–1	2–1	4–2 (67%)	28–22 (56%)	1
(West Germany) Jürgen Fassbender (West Germany) Hans-Jürgen Pohmann	5–7, 1–6		7–6, 7–6	6–4, 6–4	2–1	4–2 (67%)	32–33 (49%)	2
(United States) Sherwood Stewart (United States) Fred McNair	6–0, 6–3	6–7, 6–7		3–6, 6–3, 6–2	2–1	4–3 (57%)	39–28 (58%)	3
(United States) Brian Gottfried (Mexico) Raúl Ramírez	3–6, 1–6	4–6, 4–6	6–3, 3–6, 2–6		0–3	1–6 (14%)	23–39 (37%)	4

In three-teams-ties standings are determined by percentage of sets won, then percentage of games won.
