= 1970 Pepsi-Cola Masters – Singles =

Singles
- 1970 Pepsi-Cola Masters

Final
- Champion: (United States) Stan Smith
- Runner-up: (Australia) Rod Laver
- Score: 4–6, 6–3, 6–4

Events
| Singles | Doubles |
- ATP Finals

Stan Smith won the singles title at the 1970 Pepsi-Cola Masters. He defeated runner-up Rod Laver, although both had achieved the same number of wins.

== Round robin ==
Key

- Q = Qualifier
- WC = Wild card
- LL = Lucky loser
- Alt = Alternate
- ITF = ITF entry
- PR = Protected ranking
- SR = Special ranking
- SE = Special exempt
- JE = Junior exempt
- JR = Junior Accelerator Programme entrant
- CO = College Accelerator Programme entrant
- NG = Next Gen Accelerator Program entrant
- w/o = Walkover
- r = Retired
- d = Defaulted

| | (Australia) Rosewall | (Socialist Federal Republic of Yugoslavia) Franulović | (United States) Ashe | (United States) Smith | (Australia) Laver | (Czechoslovakia) Kodeš |
| (Australia) Ken Rosewall | | 6–3, 6–3 | 6–3, 6–4 | 4–6, 5–6 | 6–5, 3–6, 5–6 | 6–5, 6–4 |
| (Socialist Federal Republic of Yugoslavia) Željko Franulović | 3–6, 3–6 | | 5–6, 6–3, 2–6 | 1–6, 6–5, 1–6 | 5–6, 6–3, 2–6 | 6–2, 3–6, 6–3 |
| (United States) Arthur Ashe | 3–6, 4–6 | 6–5, 3–6, 6–2 | | 3–6, 6–3, 6–5 | 3–6, 2–6 | 6–3, 4–6, 6–3 |
| (United States) Stan Smith | 6–4, 6–5 | 6–1, 5–6, 6–1 | 6–3, 3–6, 5–6 | | 4–6, 6–3, 6–4 | 6–3, 6–5 |
| (Australia) Rod Laver | 5–6, 6–3, 6–5 | 6–5, 3–6, 6–2 | 6–3, 6–2 | 6–4, 3–6, 4–6 | | 6–4, 6–3 |
| (Czechoslovakia) Jan Kodeš | 5–6, 4–6 | 2–6, 6–3, 3–6 | 3–6, 6–4, 3–6 | 3–6, 5–6 | 4–6, 3–6 | |

=== Standings ===
| Player | RR W-L | Sets W-L | Games W-L | Standings |
|---|---|---|---|---|
| (United States) Stan Smith | 4–1 | 9–4 | 71–53 | 1 |
| (Australia) Rod Laver | 4–1 | 9–4 | 69–55 | 2 |
| (Australia) Ken Rosewall | 3–2 | 6–4 | 59–51 | 3 |
| (United States) Arthur Ashe | 3–2 | 6–7 | 58–53 | 4 |
| (Socialist Federal Republic of Yugoslavia) Željko Franulović | 1–4 | 5–9 | 55–70 | 5 |
| (Czechoslovakia) Jan Kodeš | 0–5 | 2–10 | 47–67 | 6 |

Standings are determined by: 1. number of wins; 2. number of matches; 3. in two-players-ties, head-to-head records; 4. in three-players-ties, percentage of sets won, or of games won; 5. steering-committee decision.

== See also ==
- ATP World Tour Finals appearances
