= 1973 Commercial Union Assurance Masters – Singles =

Singles
- 1973 Commercial Union Assurance Masters

Final
- Champion: (Romania) Ilie Năstase
- Runner-up: (Netherlands) Tom Okker
- Score: 6–3, 7–5, 4–6, 6–3

Details
- Draw: 8

Events
Singles
← 1972 ·	ATP Finals	· 1974 →

Two-time defending champion Ilie Năstase successfully defended his title, defeating Tom Okker in the final, 6–3, 7–5, 4–6, 6–3 to win the singles title at the 1973 Commercial Union Assurance Masters.

== Draw ==
=== Key ===
- Q = Qualifier
- WC = Wild card
- LL = Lucky loser
- Alt = Alternate
- ITF = ITF entry
- PR = Protected ranking
- SR = Special ranking
- SE = Special exempt
- JE = Junior exempt
- JR = Junior Accelerator Programme entrant
- CO = College Accelerator Programme entrant
- NG = Next Gen Accelerator Program entrant
- w/o = Walkover
- r = Retired
- d = Defaulted

=== Finals ===
Semifinals
(Romania) Ilie Năstase	6	7
(United States) Jimmy Connors	3	5
(Australia) John Newcombe	6	5	5/r
(Netherlands) Tom Okker	3	7	3

Final
(Romania) Ilie Năstase	6	7	4	6
(Netherlands) Tom Okker	3	5	6	3

=== Blue group ===
	(Romania) Năstase	(Australia) Newcombe	(Czechoslovakia) Kodeš	(United States) Gorman	RR; W–L	Set; W–L	Game; W–L	Standings
(Romania) Ilie Năstase		7–5, 6–3	6–4, 2–6, 6–4	4–6, 1–6	2–1	4–3	32–34	1
(Australia) John Newcombe	5–7, 3–6		6–4, 6–1	3–6, 6–2, 6–2	2–1	4–3	35–28	2
(Czechoslovakia) Jan Kodeš	4–6, 6–2, 4–6	4–6, 1–6		6–3, 3–6, 6–3	1–2	3–5	34–38	3
(United States) Tom Gorman	6–4, 6–1	6–3, 2–6, 2–6	3–6, 6–3, 3–6		1–2	4–4	34–35	4

Standings are determined by: 1. number of wins; 2. number of matches; 3. in two-players-ties, head-to-head records; 4. in three-players-ties, percentage of sets won, or of games won; 5. steering-committee decision.

=== White group ===
	(Netherlands) Okker	(United States) Connors	(United States) Smith	(Spain) Orantes	RR; W–L	Set; W–L	Game; W–L	Standings
(Netherlands) Tom Okker		7–5, 6–3	7–6, 6–3	6–1, 6–3	3–0	6–0	38–21	1
(United States) Jimmy Connors	5–7, 3–6		6–0, 3–6, 7–6	6–3, 6–2	2–1	4–3	36–30	2
(United States) Stan Smith	6–7, 3–6	0–6, 6–3, 6–7		7–5, 4–6, 6–3	1–2	3–5	38–43	3
(Spain) Manuel Orantes	1–6, 3–6	3–6, 2–6	5–7, 6–4, 3–6		0–3	1–6	23–41	4

Standings are determined by: 1. number of wins; 2. number of matches; 3. in two-players-ties, head-to-head records; 4. in three-players-ties, percentage of sets won, or of games won; 5. steering-committee decision.

== See also ==
- ATP World Tour Finals appearances
