= 1977 Colgate-Palmolive Masters – Singles =

Singles
- 1977 Colgate-Palmolive Masters

Final
- Champion: (United States) Jimmy Connors
- Runner-up: (Sweden) Björn Borg
- Score: 6–4, 1–6, 6–4

Details
- Draw: 8

Events
Singles	Doubles
← 1976 ·	ATP Finals	· 1978 →

Jimmy Connors defeated Björn Borg in the final, 6–4, 1–6, 6–4 to win the singles title at the 1977 Colgate-Palmolive Masters.

Manuel Orantes was the defending champion, but was eliminated in the round-robin.

== Draw ==
=== Key ===
- Q = Qualifier
- WC = Wild card
- LL = Lucky loser
- Alt = Alternate
- SE = Special exempt
- PR = Protected ranking
- ITF = ITF entry
- JE = Junior exempt
- w/o = Walkover
- r = Retired
- d = Defaulted
- SR = Special ranking

=== Finals ===
Semifinals
(Sweden) Björn Borg	6	6
(Argentina) Guillermo Vilas	3	3
(United States) Jimmy Connors	6	3	6
(United States) Brian Gottfried	4	6	3

Final
(Sweden) Björn Borg	4	6	4
(United States) Jimmy Connors	6	1	6

=== Group A ===
	(United States) Gottfried	(United States) Tanner	(Mexico) Ramírez	(Sweden) Borg	RR; W–L	Set; W–L	Game; W–L	Standings
(United States) Brian Gottfried		7–5, 6–2	6–7, 6–2, 6–4	–	2–0	4–1	31–20	1
(United States) Roscoe Tanner	5–7, 2–6		4–6, 4–6	4–6, 7–6, 3–6	0–3	1–6	29–43	4
(Mexico) Raúl Ramírez	7–6, 4–6, 2–6	6–4, 6–4		2–6, 4–6	1–2	3–4	31–38	3
(Sweden) Björn Borg	–	6–4, 6–7, 6–3	6–2, 6–4		2–0	4–1	30–20	2

Standings are determined by: 1. number of wins; 2. number of matches; 3. in two-players-ties, head-to-head records; 4. in three-players-ties, percentage of sets won, or of games won; 5. steering-committee decision.

=== Group B ===
	(Argentina) Vilas	(Spain) Orantes	(United States) Connors	(United States) Dibbs	RR; W–L	Set; W–L	Game; W–L	Standings
(Argentina) Guillermo Vilas		6–4, 6–1	6–4, 3–6, 7–5	–	2–0	4–1	28–20	1
(Spain) Manuel Orantes	4–6, 1–6		2–6, 3–6	7–6, 7–5	1–2	2–4	24–35	3
(United States) Jimmy Connors	4–6, 6–3, 5–7	6–2, 6–3		7–5, 6–2	2–1	5–2	40–28	2
(United States) Eddie Dibbs	–	6–7, 5–7	5–7, 2–6		0–2	0–4	18–27	4

Standings are determined by: 1. number of wins; 2. number of matches; 3. in two-players-ties, head-to-head records; 4. in three-players-ties, percentage of sets won, or of games won; 5. steering-committee decision.

== See also ==
- ATP World Tour Finals appearances
