= 1970 Masters =

1970 Masters may refer to:

- 1970 Masters Tournament, golf
- 1970 Pepsi-Cola Masters, tennis
