= 1986 Nabisco Masters =

- Date: 3–8 December (singles); 9–14 December (doubles)
- Edition: 17th (singles) / 13th (doubles)
- Category: Masters
- Draw: 8S / 8D
- Prize money: $500,000
- Surface: Carpet / indoor
- Location: New York City (singles); London (doubles)
- Venue: Madison Square Garden; Royal Albert Hall

Champions

Singles
- (Czechoslovakia) Ivan Lendl

Doubles
- (Sweden) Stefan Edberg / (Sweden) Anders Järryd
← 1985 ·	ATP Finals	· 1987 →

The 1986 Masters (also known as the 1986 Nabisco Masters for sponsorship reasons) was a men's tennis tournament. The singles event was played on indoor carpet courts in Madison Square Garden, New York City, United States between December 3 and December 8, 1986 while the doubles competition was held at the Royal Albert Hall from December 9 through December 14. It was the year-end championship of the 1986 Nabisco Grand Prix tour. It was the first edition where the round robin format, which is now associated with the event, was reintroduced. As a result the singles field was halved from 16 down to 8 competitors. It was also the first time since the inaugural edition in 1970 that no player from the United States qualified for the singles event. Ivan Lendl retained the Masters title as he won it for a fourth time. Lendl defeated Becker in straight sets in a repeat of the 1985 Masters final which took place earlier in the year, in January. In the doubles competition Stefan Edberg and Anders Järryd successfully defended the title.

== Finals ==
=== Singles ===
(Czechoslovakia) Ivan Lendl defeated (West Germany) Boris Becker, 6–4, 6–4, 6–4.

- It was Lendl's 10th and last singles title of the year 62nd of his career.

=== Doubles ===
(Sweden) Stefan Edberg / (Sweden) Anders Järryd defeated (France) Guy Forget / (France) Yannick Noah 6–3, 7–6, 6–3.
