= 1976 Commercial Union Assurance Masters – Singles =

Singles
- 1976 Commercial Union Assurance Masters

Final
- Champion: (Spain) Manuel Orantes
- Runner-up: (Poland) Wojciech Fibak
- Score: 5–7, 6–2, 0–6, 7–6^{(7–1)}, 6–1

Details
- Draw: 8

Events
Singles	Doubles
← 1975 ·	ATP Finals	· 1977 →

Manuel Orantes defeated Wojciech Fibak in the final, 5–7, 6–2, 0–6, 7–6^{(7–1)}, 6–1 to win the singles title at the 1976 Commercial Union Assurance Masters. Fibak had served for a four-set win.

Ilie Năstase was the defending champion, but did not participate this year.

== Draw ==
=== Key ===
- Q = Qualifier
- WC = Wild card
- LL = Lucky loser
- Alt = Alternate
- ITF = ITF entry
- PR = Protected ranking
- SR = Special ranking
- SE = Special exempt
- JE = Junior exempt
- JR = Junior Accelerator Programme entrant
- CO = College Accelerator Programme entrant
- NG = Next Gen Accelerator Program entrant
- w/o = Walkover
- r = Retired
- d = Defaulted

=== Finals ===
Semifinals
(United States) Harold Solomon	4	3	4
(Spain) Manuel Orantes	6	6	6
(Argentina) Guillermo Vilas	2	2	7	6	6
(Poland) Wojciech Fibak	6	6	5	3	8

Final
(Spain) Manuel Orantes	5	6	0	7^{7}	6
(Poland) Wojciech Fibak	7	2	6	6^{1}	1

=== Group A ===
	(United States) Solomon	(United States) Gottfried	(Mexico) Ramírez	(Argentina) Vilas	RR; W–L	Set; W–L	Game; W–L	Standings
(United States) Harold Solomon		6–4, 6–2	6–2, 6–2	3–6, 6–4, 4–6`	2–1	5–2	37–26	2
(United States) Brian Gottfried	4–6, 2–6		4–6, 6–3, 6–0	6–3, 2–6, 6–4	2–1	4–4	36–34	3
(Mexico) Raúl Ramírez	2–6, 2–6	6–4, 3–6, 0–6		6–7, 6–2, 5–7	0–3	2–6	30–44	4
(Argentina) Guillermo Vilas	6–3, 4–6, 6–4	3–6, 6–2, 4–6	7–6, 2–6, 7–5		2–1	5–4	45–44	1

Standings are determined by: 1. number of wins; 2. number of matches; 3. in two-players-ties, head-to-head records; 4. in three-players-ties, percentage of sets won, or of games won; 5. steering-committee decision.

=== Group B ===
	(Poland) Fibak	(Spain) Orantes	(United States) Dibbs	(United States) Tanner	RR; W–L	Set; W–L	Game; W–L	Standings
(Poland) Wojciech Fibak		7–5, 7–6	6–2, 6–4	6–7, 3–6	2–1	4–2	35–30	2
(Spain) Manuel Orantes	5–7, 6–7		6–4, 6–2	7–6, 6–3	2–1	4–2	36–29	1
(United States) Eddie Dibbs	2–6, 4–6	4–6, 2–6		6–4, 7–5	1–2	2–4	25–33	3
(United States) Roscoe Tanner	7–6, 6–3	6–7, 3–6	4–6, 5–7		1–2	2–4	31–35	4

Standings are determined by: 1. number of wins; 2. number of matches; 3. in two-players-ties, head-to-head records; 4. in three-players-ties, percentage of sets won, or of games won; 5. steering-committee decision.

== See also ==
- ATP World Tour Finals appearances
