= 1973 Masters =

1973 Masters may refer to:

- 1973 Masters Tournament, golf
- 1973 Commercial Union Assurance Masters, tennis
