= 1975 Commercial Union Assurance Masters – Singles =

Singles
- 1975 Commercial Union Assurance Masters

Final
- Champion: (Romania) Ilie Năstase
- Runner-up: (Sweden) Björn Borg
- Score: 6–2, 6–2, 6–1

Details
- Draw: 8

Events
Singles	Doubles
← 1974 ·	ATP Finals	· 1976 →

Ilie Năstase defeated Björn Borg in the final, 6–2, 6–2, 6–1 to win the singles title at the 1975 Commercial Union Assurance Masters.

Guillermo Vilas was the defending champion, but lost to Năstase in the semifinals in a rematch of the previous year's final.

== Draw ==
=== Key ===
- Q = Qualifier
- WC = Wild card
- LL = Lucky loser
- Alt = Alternate
- SE = Special exempt
- PR = Protected ranking
- ITF = ITF entry
- JE = Junior exempt
- w/o = Walkover
- r = Retired
- d = Defaulted
- SR = Special ranking

=== Finals ===
Semifinals
(Romania) Ilie Năstase	6	6	6
(Argentina) Guillermo Vilas	0	3	4
(Sweden) Björn Borg	6	3	6	6
(United States) Arthur Ashe	4	6	2	2

Final
(Romania) Ilie Năstase	6	6	6
(Sweden) Björn Borg	2	2	1

=== Blue group ===
	(Spain) Orantes	(Italy) Panatta	(Romania) Năstase	(United States) Ashe	RR; W–L	Set; W–L	Game; W–L	Standings
(Spain) Manuel Orantes		6–4, 7–6	6–3, 4–6, 4–6	4–6, 1–6	1–2	3–4	32–37	3
(Italy) Adriano Panatta	4–6, 6–7		6–7, 6–3, 0–6	6–7, 3–6	0–3	1–6	31–42	4
(Romania) Ilie Năstase	3–6, 6–4, 6–4	7–6, 3–6, 6–0		6–1, 5–7, 1–4 d	2–1	5–3	43–40	2
(United States) Arthur Ashe	6–4, 6–1	7–6, 6–3	1–6, 7–5, 4–1 d		3–0	6–1	47–36	1

Standings are determined by: 1. number of wins; 2. number of matches; 3. in two-players-ties, head-to-head records; 4. in three-players-ties, percentage of sets won, or of games won; 5. steering-committee decision.

=== White group ===
	(United States) Solomon	(Mexico) Ramírez	(Argentina) Vilas	(Sweden) Borg	RR; W–L	Set; W–L	Game; W–L	Standings
(United States) Harold Solomon		5–7, 6–3, 6–3	3–6, 4–6	2–6, 2–6	1–2	2–5	27–37	3
(Mexico) Raúl Ramírez	7–5, 3–6, 3–6		4–6, 0–6	3–6, 3–6	0–3	1–6	17–41	4
(Argentina) Guillermo Vilas	6–3, 6–4	6–4, 6–0		7–5, 4–6, 6–1	3–0	6–1	41–23	1
(Sweden) Björn Borg	6–2, 6–2	6–3, 6–3	5–7, 6–4, 1–6		2–1	5–2	36–27	2

Standings are determined by: 1. number of wins; 2. number of matches; 3. in two-players-ties, head-to-head records; 4. in three-players-ties, percentage of sets won, or of games won; 5. steering-committee decision.

== See also ==
- ATP World Tour Finals appearances
