= 1999 ATP Tour World Championships =

- Date: 23–28 November (singles); 17–21 November (doubles)
- Edition: 30th (singles) / 26th (doubles)
- Category: Tour Championships
- Prize money: $3,600,000
- Surface: Hard / Indoor
- Location: Hanover, Germany

Champions

Singles
- (United States) Pete Sampras

Doubles
- (Canada) Sébastien Lareau / (United States) Alex O'Brien
| ← 1998 · | ATP Finals | · 2000 → |

The 1999 ATP Tour World Championships (also known for the doubles event as the Phoenix ATP Tour World Doubles Championship for sponsorship reasons) was a men's tennis tournament played on indoor carpet courts. The surface was called "GreenSet On Wood" which had a wood base coated in synthetic material and provided a medium-pace surface. It was the 30th edition of the year-end singles championships, the 26th edition of the year-end doubles championships, and both were part of the 1999 ATP Tour. The singles event took place at the EXPO 2000 Tennis Dome in Hanover, Germany, from November 23 through November 28, 1999, and the doubles event at the Hartford Civic Center in Hartford, Connecticut, United States, from 17 November through 21 November 1999.

== Finals ==
=== Singles ===
(United States) Pete Sampras defeated (United States) Andre Agassi, 6–1, 7–5, 6–4

- It was Pete Sampras' 5th title of the year, and his 60th overall. It was his 5th and last year-end championships title.

=== Doubles ===
(Canada) Sébastien Lareau / (United States) Alex O'Brien defeated (India) Mahesh Bhupathi / (India) Leander Paes, 6–3, 6–2, 6–2

== See also ==
- Agassi–Sampras rivalry
