= 1985 Masters =

1985 Masters may refer to:

- 1985 Masters Tournament, golf
- 1985 Masters (snooker)
- 1985 Nabisco Masters, tennis
