= 1971 Pepsi-Cola Masters =

1971 Masters Grand Prix
- Date: 4–12 December
- Edition: 2nd
- Category: Masters
- Draw: 7S (round robin)
- Prize money: $48,000
- Surface: Carpet / indoor
- Location: Paris, France
- Venue: Coubertin Stadium

Champions

Singles
- (Romania) Ilie Năstase
| ← 1970 · | ATP Finals | · 1972 → |

The 1971 Masters was a men's tennis tournament played on indoor carpet courts at the Coubertin Stadium in Paris, France. It was the 2nd edition of the Masters Grand Prix and was the season-ending event of the 1971 Grand Prix circuit. The tournament consisted of a round robin competition for the seven highest points scorers of the Grand Prix circuit. John Newcombe and Ken Rosewall, players signed to the rival World Championship Circuit but who also took part in several Grand Prix tournaments, had qualified for the event but declined to participate. The tournament was held from 4 December until 12 December 1971 and was won by Ilie Năstase who earned the $15,000 first prize.

== Final ==
=== Singles ===
(Romania) Ilie Năstase won a round robin competition also featuring (France) Pierre Barthès, (Socialist Federal Republic of Yugoslavia) Željko Franulović, (United States) Clark Graebner, (Czechoslovakia) Jan Kodeš, (United States) Cliff Richey and (United States) Stan Smith.

- It was Năstase's 8th singles title of the year and the 10th of his career.

== See also ==
- 1971 World Championship Tennis Finals
