= 2001 Tennis Masters Cup =

- Date: 12–18 November
- Edition: 32nd
- Category: Masters
- Draw: 8S
- Prize money: $3,700,000
- Surface: Hard / indoor
- Location: Sydney, Australia
- Venue: Sydney Superdome

Champions

Singles
- (Australia) Lleyton Hewitt
← 2000 ·	ATP Finals	· 2002 →

The 2001 Tennis Masters Cup was a men's tennis tournament played on indoor hard courts. It was the 32nd edition of the year-end singles championships and was part of the 2001 ATP Tour. The tournament was held at the Sydney Superdome in Sydney, Australia from 12 November through 18 November 2001. The doubles competition was set to take place in Bangalore, India but was cancelled because of security fears following the September 11 attacks. A competition was held in early 2002, but it did not provide any ranking points and was held as the ATP World Doubles Challenge Cup. Lleyton Hewitt won the singles title.

== Champions ==
=== Singles ===
(Australia) Lleyton Hewitt defeated (France) Sébastien Grosjean 6–3, 6–3, 6–4

- It was Hewitt's 6th title of the year and the 14th of his career. It was his 1st career year-end championship title.

=== Doubles ===
Competition cancelled replaced by 2001 Touchtel ATP World Doubles Challenge Cup.
