= 1975 Commercial Union Assurance Masters =

- Date: November 30 – December 7
- Edition: 6th
- Category: Masters
- Draw: 8S / 4D
- Prize money: $130,000
- Surface: Carpet / indoor
- Location: Stockholm, Sweden
- Venue: Kungliga tennishallen

Champions

Singles
- (Romania) Ilie Năstase

Doubles
- (Spain) Juan Gisbert, Sr. / (Spain) Manuel Orantes
← 1974 ·	ATP Finals	· 1976 →

The 1975 Masters (also known as the 1975 Commercial Union Assurance Masters for sponsorship reasons) was a men's tennis tournament played on indoor carpet courts at the Kungliga tennishallen in Stockholm, Sweden. The tournament was the season ending event of the 1975 Commercial Union Assurance Grand Prix circuit and was played by the eight highest ranking singles players and the four highest ranked doubles teams. It was the 6th edition of the Masters Grand Prix and was held from November 30 through December 7, 1975. Ilie Năstase won the singles title and the $40,000 first prize.

== Finals ==
=== Singles ===
(Romania) Ilie Năstase defeated (Sweden) Björn Borg 6–2, 6–2, 6–1

- It was Năstase's 9th title of the year and the 77th of his career.

=== Doubles ===
(Spain) Juan Gisbert, Sr. / (Spain) Manuel Orantes won a round robin competition.

- It was Gisbert, Sr's 9th title of the year and the 20th of his career. It was Orantes' 14th title of the year and the 39th of his career.

== See also ==
- 1975 World Championship Tennis Finals
- 1975 WCT World Doubles
