= 1977 Colgate-Palmolive Masters – Doubles =

Doubles
- 1977 Colgate-Palmolive Masters

Final
- Champion: (South Africa) Bob Hewitt (South Africa) Frew McMillan
- Runner-up: (United States) Robert Lutz (United States) Stan Smith
- Score: 7–5, 7–6, 6–3

Events
Singles	Doubles
← 1976 ·	Colgate-Palmolive Masters	· 1978 →

Bob Hewitt and Frew McMillan defeated Robert Lutz and Stan Smith in the final, 7–5, 7–6, 6–3 to win the doubles tennis title at the 1977 Masters Grand Prix.

Fred McNair and Sherwood Stewart were the reigning champions, but they did not compete this year.

== Knockout stage ==
=== Key ===
- Q = Qualifier
- WC = Wild card
- LL = Lucky loser
- Alt = Alternate
- SE = Special exempt
- PR = Protected ranking
- ITF = ITF entry
- JE = Junior exempt
- w/o = Walkover
- r = Retired
- d = Defaulted
- SR = Special ranking

=== Finals ===
Semifinals
(United States) Robert Lutz (United States) Stan Smith	4	6	7
(United States) Brian Gottfried (Mexico) Raúl Ramírez	6	3	6
(South Africa) Bob Hewitt (South Africa) Frew McMillan	7	7
(Australia) John Alexander (Australia) Phil Dent	6	6

Final
(United States) Robert Lutz (United States) Stan Smith	5	6	3
(South Africa) Bob Hewitt (South Africa) Frew McMillan	7	7	6
