= 1985 Nabisco Masters – Doubles =

Doubles
- 1985 Nabisco Masters

Final
- Champion: (Sweden) Stefan Edberg (Sweden) Anders Järryd
- Runner-up: (Sweden) Joakim Nyström (Sweden) Mats Wilander
- Score: 6–1, 7–6

Details
- Draw: 8
- Seeds: 4

Events
Singles	Doubles
← 1984 ·	Nabisco Masters	· 1986 →

Stefan Edberg and Anders Järryd defeated Joakim Nyström and Mats Wilander in the final, 6–1, 7–6 to win the doubles tennis title at the 1985 Masters Grand Prix.

Peter Fleming and John McEnroe were the seven-time reigning champions, but failed to qualify this year.

== Seeds ==
1. (United States) Ken Flach / (United States) Robert Seguso (Semi-finalist)
2. (Sweden) Stefan Edberg / (Sweden) Anders Järryd (champion)
3. (United States) Paul Annacone / (South Africa) Christo van Rensburg (Semi-finalist)
4. (Sweden) Joakim Nyström / (Sweden) Mats Wilander (Runner up)

== Draw ==
=== Key ===
- Q = Qualifier
- WC = Wild card
- LL = Lucky loser
- Alt = Alternate
- SE = Special exempt
- PR = Protected ranking
- ITF = ITF entry
- JE = Junior exempt
- w/o = Walkover
- r = Retired
- d = Defaulted
- SR = Special ranking

Quarter-finals
1	(United States) Ken Flach (United States) Robert Seguso	6	7
(Spain) Sergio Casal (Spain) Emilio Sánchez	0	6
4	(Sweden) Joakim Nyström (Sweden) Mats Wilander	7	4	7
(Australia) Mark Edmondson (Australia) Kim Warwick	6	6	6
(Switzerland) Heinz Günthardt (Hungary) Balázs Taróczy	7	3	6
3	(United States) Paul Annacone (South Africa) Christo van Rensburg	5	6	7
(Czechoslovakia) Pavel Složil (Czechoslovakia) Tomáš Šmíd	6	2
2	(Sweden) Stefan Edberg (Sweden) Anders Järryd	7	6

Semi-finals
1	(United States) Ken Flach (United States) Robert Seguso	2	1
4	(Sweden) Joakim Nyström (Sweden) Mats Wilander	6	6
3	(United States) Paul Annacone (South Africa) Christo van Rensburg	4	3
2	(Sweden) Stefan Edberg (Sweden) Anders Järryd	6	6

Final
4	(Sweden) Joakim Nyström (Sweden) Mats Wilander	1	6
2	(Sweden) Stefan Edberg (Sweden) Anders Järryd	6	7
