= 1981 Volvo Masters – Doubles =

Doubles
- 1981 Volvo Masters

Final
- Champion: (United States) Peter Fleming (United States) John McEnroe
- Runner-up: (South Africa) Kevin Curren (United States) Steve Denton
- Score: 6–3, 6–3

Events
Singles	Doubles
← 1980 ·	Volvo Masters	· 1982 →

Three-time defending champions Peter Fleming and John McEnroe successfully defended their title, defeating Kevin Curren and Steve Denton in the final, 6–3, 6–3 to win the doubles tennis title at the 1981 Masters Grand Prix.

== Knockout stage ==
=== Key ===
- Q = Qualifier
- WC = Wild card
- LL = Lucky loser
- Alt = Alternate
- SE = Special exempt
- PR = Protected ranking
- ITF = ITF entry
- JE = Junior exempt
- w/o = Walkover
- r = Retired
- d = Defaulted
- SR = Special ranking

=== Draw ===
Semifinals
(United States) Peter Fleming (United States) John McEnroe	6	6
(Australia) Peter McNamara (Australia) Paul McNamee	1	3
(Switzerland) Heinz Günthardt (Hungary) Balázs Taróczy	7	3	3
(South Africa) Kevin Curren (United States) Steve Denton	5	6	6

Final
(United States) Peter Fleming (United States) John McEnroe	6	6
(South Africa) Kevin Curren (United States) Steve Denton	3	3
