= 1995 ATP Tour World Championships =

- Date: 14–19 November (singles); 22–26 November (doubles)
- Edition: 26th (singles) / 22nd (doubles)
- Category: Tour Championships
- Prize money: $3,000,000
- Surface: Carpet / indoor
- Location: Frankfurt, Germany (singles); Eindhoven, Netherlands (doubles)
- Venue: Frankfurt Festhalle (singles)

Champions

Singles
- (Germany) Boris Becker

Doubles
- (Canada) Grant Connell / (United States) Patrick Galbraith
← 1994 ·	ATP Finals	· 1996 →

The 1995 ATP Tour World Championships (also known for the singles event as the IBM-ATP Tour World Championship for sponsorship reasons) were men's tennis tournaments played on indoor carpet courts. The event marked the 26th edition of the year-end singles championships and the 22nd edition of the year-end doubles championships, where both were part of the 1995 ATP Tour. The singles event took place at the Frankfurt Festhalle in Frankfurt, Germany, from 14 November until 19 November 1995, and the doubles event in Eindhoven, Netherlands, from 22 November until 26 November 1995. Boris Becker won the singles title.

== Champions ==
=== Singles ===
(Germany) Boris Becker defeated (United States) Michael Chang, 7–6^{(7–3)}, 6–0, 7–6^{(7–5)}

- It was Becker's 2nd title of the year, and his 44th overall. It was his 3rd year-end championships title.

=== Doubles ===
(Canada) Grant Connell / (United States) Patrick Galbraith defeated (Netherlands) Jacco Eltingh / (Netherlands) Paul Haarhuis, 7–6^{(8–6)}, 7–6^{(8–6)}, 3–6, 7–6^{(7–2)}.
