= 1991 ATP Tour World Championships =

- Date: 12–17 November
- Edition: 22nd
- Category: Masters
- Draw: 8S / 8D
- Prize money: $2,270,000 (S) $1,000,000 (D)
- Surface: Carpet / indoor (S); Hard / indoor (D)
- Location: Frankfurt, Germany (S); Johannesburg, South Africa (D)
- Venue: Festhalle Frankfurt (S)

Champions

Singles
- (United States) Pete Sampras

Doubles
- (Australia) John Fitzgerald / (Sweden) Anders Järryd
← 1990 ·	ATP Finals	· 1992 →

The 1991 ATP Tour World Championships was the men's tennis season-ending tournament. The singles event was also known as the IBM ATP Tour World Championships and was played on indoor carpet courts at the Festhalle Frankfurt in Germany. The doubles event, also known as the Standard Bank ATP Tour World Doubles Final, was played on indoor hard courts in held in Johannesburg, South Africa. Both competitions were held between 12 November and 17 November 1991. Sixth-seeded Pete Sampras won the singles title and John Fitzgerald with Anders Järryd won the doubles title.

== Finals ==
=== Singles ===
(United States) Pete Sampras defeated (United States) Jim Courier, 3–6, 7–6^{(7–5)}, 6–3, 6–4

- It was Sampras' 4th singles title of the year 8th of his career.

=== Doubles ===
(Australia) John Fitzgerald / (Sweden) Anders Järryd defeated (United States) Ken Flach / (United States) Robert Seguso 6–4, 6–4, 2–6, 6–4.
