= 1978 Colgate-Palmolive Masters =

- Date: January 10–14, 1979
- Edition: 9th
- Category: Masters
- Draw: 8S / 4D
- Prize money: $400,000
- Surface: Carpet / indoor
- Location: New York City, US
- Venue: Madison Square Garden

Champions

Singles
- (United States) John McEnroe

Doubles
- (United States) John McEnroe / (United States) Peter Fleming
- ATP Finals

The 1978 Masters (also known as the 1978 Colgate-Palmolive Masters for sponsorship reasons) was a men's tennis tournament played on indoor carpet courts in Madison Square Garden, New York City, United States between 10 January and 14 January 1979. It was the year-end championship of the 1978 Grand Prix circuit tour. John McEnroe won the singles title.

== Finals ==
=== Singles ===
(United States) John McEnroe defeated (United States) Arthur Ashe, 6–7, 6–3, 7–5

- It was McEnroe's 1st singles title of the year and the 5th of his career.

=== Doubles ===
(United States) John McEnroe / (United States) Peter Fleming defeated (Netherlands) Tom Okker / (Poland) Wojtek Fibak 6–4, 6–2, 6-4
