= 1992 ATP Tour World Championships =

- Date: 16–20 November
- Edition: 23rd
- Category: Masters
- Draw: 8S / 8D
- Prize money: $2,500,000 (singles) $1,000,000 (doubles)
- Surface: Carpet / indoor (singles); Hard / indoor (doubles)
- Location: Frankfurt, Germany (singles); Johannesburg, South Africa (doubles)
- Venue: Festhalle Frankfurt

Champions

Singles
- (Germany) Boris Becker

Doubles
- (Australia) Todd Woodbridge / (Australia) Mark Woodforde
← 1991 ·	ATP Finals	· 1993 →

The 1992 ATP Tour World Championships (also known as the IBM ATP Tour World Championships for sponsorship reasons) was a men's tennis tournament held in Frankfurt, Germany from 16 November until 20 November 1992. It was the 23rd edition of the tournament. Seventh-seeded Boris Becker won the singles title. The doubles event was held in Johannesburg.

== Finals ==
=== Singles ===
(Germany) Boris Becker defeated (United States) Jim Courier, 6–4, 6–3, 7–5

- It was Becker's 5th singles title of the year and the 36th of his career.

=== Doubles ===
(Australia) Todd Woodbridge / (Australia) Mark Woodforde defeated (Australia) John Fitzgerald / (Sweden) Anders Järryd 6–2, 7–6^{(7–4)}, 5–7, 3–6, 6–3.
