= 1989 Nabisco Masters =

- Date: November 27 – December 3
- Edition: 20th (singles) / 16th (doubles)
- Category: Masters
- Prize money: $750,000
- Surface: Carpet / indoor
- Location: New York City, United States (singles); London, United Kingdom (doubles)

Champions

Singles
- (Sweden) Stefan Edberg

Doubles
- (United States) Jim Grabb / (United States) Patrick McEnroe
- ATP Finals

The 1989 Masters (also known as the 1989 Nabisco Masters for sponsorship reasons) were men's tennis tournaments played on indoor carpet courts at Madison Square Garden in New York City, New York, United States and at the Royal Albert Hall in London, United Kingdom. It was the 20th edition of the year-end singles championships, the 16th edition of the year-end doubles championships, and both tournaments were part of the 1989 Nabisco Grand Prix. The singles championships were held in New York from November 27 through December 3, 1989, while the doubles championship were held in London from December 6 through December 10, 1989. Stefan Edberg won the singles title.

== Finals ==
=== Singles ===
(Sweden) Stefan Edberg defeated (West Germany) Boris Becker, 4–6, 7–6^{(8–6)}, 6–3, 6–1

- It was Edberg's 2nd title of the year and the 35th of his career.

=== Doubles ===
(United States) Jim Grabb / (United States) Patrick McEnroe defeated (Australia) John Fitzgerald / (Sweden) Anders Järryd, 7–5, 7–6, 5–7, 6–3.

- It was Grabb's 2nd title of the year and the 5th of his career. It was McEnroe's 2nd title of the year and the 4th of his career.
