= 2002 Tennis Masters Cup =

- Date: 12–18 November
- Edition: 33rd
- Category: Masters
- Draw: 8S
- Prize money: $3,700,000
- Surface: Hard / indoor
- Location: Shanghai, China
- Venue: Shanghai New International Expo Center

Champions

Singles
- (Australia) Lleyton Hewitt
← 2001 ·	ATP Finals	· 2003 →

The 2002 Tennis Masters Cup was a men's tennis tournament played on indoor hard courts. It was the 33rd edition of the year-end singles championships and was part of the 2002 ATP Tour. It took place at the Shanghai New International Expo Center in Shanghai, China from 12 November through 18 November 2002. No doubles competition was held. First-seeded Lleyton Hewitt won the title.

== Final ==
=== Singles ===
(Australia) Lleyton Hewitt defeated (Spain) Juan Carlos Ferrero 7–5, 7–5, 2–6, 2–6, 6–4

- It was Hewitt's 5th title of the year and the 19th of his career. It was his 2nd consecutive year-end championships title.
