= 1993 ATP Tour World Championships =

- Date: 16–21 November (singles); 24–28 November (doubles)
- Edition: 24th
- Category: Tour Championships
- Surface: Carpet / indoor
- Location: Frankfurt, Germany (singles); Johannesburg, South Africa (doubles)

Champions

Singles
- (Germany) Michael Stich

Doubles
- (Netherlands) Jacco Eltingh / (Netherlands) Paul Haarhuis
← 1992 ·	ATP Finals	· 1994 →

The 1993 ATP Tour World Championships was a men's tennis tournament that was part of the 1993 IBM ATP Tour. It was the 24th edition of the singles year-end tournament and was held from 16 to 21 November on indoor carpet courts in Frankfurt, Germany. Michael Stich won the singles title. The doubles tournament took place between 24 and 28 November 1993 on hard courts in Johannesburg, South Africa.

== Finals ==
=== Singles ===
(Germany) Michael Stich defeated (United States) Pete Sampras, 7–6^{(7–3)}, 2–6, 7–6^{(9–7)}, 6–2

=== Doubles ===
(Netherlands) Jacco Eltingh / (Netherlands) Paul Haarhuis defeated (Australia) Todd Woodbridge / (Australia) Mark Woodforde, 7–6^{(7–4)}, 7–6^{(7–5)}, 6–4.
