= 1982 Volvo Masters =

- Date: January 18–23, 1983
- Edition: 13th
- Category: Masters
- Draw: 12S / 6D
- Prize money: $400,000
- Surface: Carpet / indoor
- Location: New York City, NY, US
- Venue: Madison Square Garden

Champions

Singles
- (Czechoslovakia) Ivan Lendl

Doubles
- (United States) Peter Fleming / (United States) John McEnroe
- ATP Finals

The 1982 Masters, also known as the 1982 Volvo Masters for sponsorship reasons, was a men's tennis tournament held in Madison Square Garden, New York City, United States between 18–23 January 1983. It was the year-end championship of the 1982 Volvo Grand Prix tour and was played on indoor carpet courts. The round-robin format of previous editions was replaced by a knock-out tournament featuring the 12 highest ranking singles players as well as the six best doubles teams of the Grand Prix circuit. The top four seeds in the singles event received a bye in the first round and all singles matches were played as best-of-three sets, except the final which was a best-of-five set match.

== Finals ==
=== Singles ===
(Czechoslovakia) Ivan Lendl defeated (United States) John McEnroe 6–4, 6–4, 6–2

- It was Lendl's 15th singles title of the year and the 32nd of his career

=== Doubles ===
(United States) Peter Fleming / (United States) John McEnroe defeated (United States) Sherwood Stewart / (United States) Ferdi Taygan 7–5, 6–3

== Tournament ==
The Masters tournament offered $400,000 prize money and began on Tuesday, January 18, 1983. The seeding of the players was based on the Grand Prix points gathered during the 1982 season which consisted of 82 tournaments. During the first two evenings of the Masters the four preliminary rounds were played in the singles event. On Tuesday 10,742 spectators filled the 18,500-seat stadium and saw 11th seed José Luis Clerc defeat fifth seed Mats Wilander in three sets followed by a three set victory of ninth seed Andrés Gómez over seventh seed José Higueras. On Wednesday, January 19 in front of 12,776 visitors sixth seed Vitas Gerulaitis lost in three sets to 12th seed Yannick Noah and in the final match of the first round eighth seed Johan Kriek defeated tenth seed Steve Denton in three sets. The quarterfinals were played on Thursday, January 20 and Friday, January 21 in front of a 14,985 crowd and were all won in straight sets by the highest four seeded players: Jimmy Connors, Guillermo Vilas, Ivan Lendl and John McEnroe.

The first semifinal match between McEnroe and Vilas was played on Saturday, January 22 in front of 18,000 spectators and was won in straight sets by McEnroe in 82 minutes. The second semifinal, between Lendl and Connors, was even more lopsided and was won by Lendl in straight sets in 63 minutes with the loss of only four games.

The final between Lendl and McEnroe was played on Sunday, January 23 and was watched in the stadium by 18,257 people. Lendl won the best-of-five match in straight sets in two hours and nine minutes and received the $100,000 winner's cheque as well as a motor car. McEnroe received $60,000 for the runner-up spot. It was Lendl's 59th consecutive indoor win and his 15th tournament title of the 1982 season. McEnroe's defeat broke his 26-match winning streak since the semifinal of the 1982 US Open.

== See also ==
- Lendl–McEnroe rivalry
