= 1978 Colgate-Palmolive Masters – Doubles =

Doubles
- 1978 Colgate-Palmolive Masters

Final
- Champion: (United States) Peter Fleming (United States) John McEnroe
- Runner-up: (Poland) Wojciech Fibak (Netherlands) Tom Okker
- Score: 6–4, 6–2, 6–4

Events
Singles	Doubles
← 1977 ·	Colgate-Palmolive Masters	· 1979 →

Peter Fleming and John McEnroe defeated Wojciech Fibak and Tom Okker in the final, 6–4, 6–2, 6–4 to win the doubles tennis title at the 1978 Masters Grand Prix. It was the first of seven consecutive Tour Finals titles for the team, a record.

Bob Hewitt and Frew McMillan were the defending champions, but were defeated in the semifinals by Fleming and McEnroe.

== Knockout stage ==
Key

- Q = Qualifier
- WC = Wild card
- LL = Lucky loser
- Alt = Alternate
- ITF = ITF entry
- PR = Protected ranking
- SR = Special ranking
- SE = Special exempt
- JE = Junior exempt
- JR = Junior Accelerator Programme entrant
- CO = College Accelerator Programme entrant
- NG = Next Gen Accelerator Program entrant
- w/o = Walkover
- r = Retired
- d = Defaulted

=== Draw ===
Semifinals
(Poland) Wojciech Fibak (Netherlands) Tom Okker	6	6
(United States) Bob Lutz (United States) Stan Smith	4	3
(United States) Peter Fleming (United States) John McEnroe	6	6
(South Africa) Bob Hewitt (South Africa) Frew McMillan	1	4

Final
(Poland) Wojciech Fibak (Netherlands) Tom Okker	4	2	4
(United States) Peter Fleming (United States) John McEnroe	6	6	6
