= 1977 Colgate-Palmolive Masters =

- Date: January 4–8, 1978
- Edition: 8th
- Category: Masters
- Draw: 8S / 4D
- Prize money: $400,000
- Surface: Carpet / Indoor
- Location: New York City, US
- Venue: Madison Square Garden

Champions

Singles
- (United States) Jimmy Connors

Doubles
- (South Africa) Bob Hewitt / (South Africa) Frew McMillan
- ATP Finals

The 1977 Masters (also known as the 1977 Colgate-Palmolive Masters for sponsorship reasons) was a men's tennis tournament held in Madison Square Garden, New York City, New York between January 4, and January 8, 1978. It was the year-end championship of the 1977 Colgate-Palmolive Grand Prix tour. Jimmy Connors won the singles title.

== Finals ==
=== Singles ===
(United States) Jimmy Connors defeated (Sweden) Björn Borg, 6–4, 1–6, 6–4

- It was Connors's 8th singles title of the year and the 61st of his career.

=== Doubles ===
(South Africa) Bob Hewitt / (South Africa) Frew McMillan defeated (United States) Robert Lutz / (United States) Stan Smith 7–5, 7–6, 6–3

== See also ==
- Borg–Connors rivalry
