= 1991 ATP Tour World Championships – Doubles =

Doubles
- 1991 ATP Tour World Championships

Final
- Champion: (Australia) John Fitzgerald (Sweden) Anders Järryd
- Runner-up: (United States) Ken Flach (United States) Robert Seguso
- Score: 6–4, 6–4, 2–6, 6–4

Events
Singles	Doubles
- ATP Tour World Championships

John Fitzgerald and Anders Järryd defeated Ken Flach and Robert Seguso in the final, 6–4, 6–4, 2–6, 6–4 to win the doubles tennis title at the 1991 ATP Tour World Championships.

Guy Forget and Jakob Hlasek were the reigning champions, but did not compete this year.

== Draw ==
Key

- Q = Qualifier
- WC = Wild card
- LL = Lucky loser
- Alt = Alternate
- ITF = ITF entry
- PR = Protected ranking
- SR = Special ranking
- SE = Special exempt
- JE = Junior exempt
- JR = Junior Accelerator Programme entrant
- CO = College Accelerator Programme entrant
- NG = Next Gen Accelerator Program entrant
- w/o = Walkover
- r = Retired
- d = Defaulted

=== Finals ===
Semifinals
(Australia) John Fitzgerald (Sweden) Anders Järryd	7	6
(Australia) Todd Woodbridge (Australia) Mark Woodforde	5	2
(Canada) Grant Connell (Canada) Glenn Michibata	6	6
(United States) Ken Flach (United States) Robert Seguso	7	7

Final
(Australia) John Fitzgerald (Sweden) Anders Järryd	6	6	2	6
(United States) Ken Flach (United States) Robert Seguso	4	4	6	4

=== Group A ===
	(Australia) Fitzgerald (Sweden) Järryd	(Netherlands) Nijssen (Czechoslovakia) Suk	(Canada) Connell (Canada) Michibata	(United States) Galbraith (United States) Witsken	RR; W?L	Set; W?L	Game; W?L	Standings
(Australia) John Fitzgerald (Sweden) Anders Järryd		6–3, 6–4	7–6, 6–4	6–1, 2–6, 7–6	3–0	6–1	40–30	1
(Netherlands) Tom Nijssen (Czechoslovakia) Cyril Suk	3–6, 4–6		6–4, 6–7, 6–7	6–7, 2–6	0–3	1–6	33–43	4
(Canada) Grant Connell (Canada) Glenn Michibata	6–7, 4–6	4–6, 7–6, 7–6		6–3, 3–6, 7–5	2–1	4–4	44–45	2
(United States) Patrick Galbraith (United States) Todd Witsken	1–6, 6–2, 6–7	7–6, 6–2	3–6, 6–3, 5–7		1–2	4–4	40–39	3

Standings are determined by: 1. number of wins; 2. number of matches; 3. in two-players-ties, head-to-head records; 4. in three-players-ties, percentage of sets won, or of games won; 5. steering-committee decision.

=== Group B ===
	(United States) Flach (United States) Seguso	(Australia) Woodbridge (Australia) Woodforde	(United States) Jensen (Australia) Warder	(United States) Davis (United States) Pate	RR; W?L	Set; W?L	Game; W?L	Standings
(United States) Ken Flach (United States) Robert Seguso		7–6, 7–6	7–6, 6–3	6–4, 6–4	3–0	6–0	39–29	1
(Australia) Todd Woodbridge (Australia) Mark Woodforde	6–7, 6–7		7–6, 3–6, 6–4	6–7, 6–4, 6–4	2–1	4–4	46–45	2
(United States) Luke Jensen (Australia) Laurie Warder	6–7, 3–6	6–7, 6–3, 4–6		6–4, 6–3	1–2	3–3	37–36	3
(United States) Scott Davis (United States) David Pate	4–6, 4–6	7–6, 4–6, 4–6	4–6, 3–6		0–3	1–6	45–41	4

Standings are determined by: 1. number of wins; 2. number of matches; 3. in two-players-ties, head-to-head records; 4. in three-players-ties, percentage of sets won, or of games won; 5. steering-committee decision.
