= 1993 ATP Tour World Championships – Doubles =

Doubles
- 1993 ATP Tour World Championships

Final
- Champion: (Netherlands) Jacco Eltingh (Netherlands) Paul Haarhuis
- Runner-up: (Australia) Todd Woodbridge (Australia) Mark Woodforde
- Score: 7–6^{(7–4)}, 7–6^{(7–5)}, 6–4

Details
- Draw: 8

Events
Singles	Doubles
- ATP Tour World Championships

Jacco Eltingh and Paul Haarhuis defeated the defending champions Todd Woodbridge and Mark Woodforde in the final, 7–6^{(7–4)}, 7–6^{(7–5)}, 6–4 to win the doubles tennis title at the 1993 ATP Tour World Championships.

== Draw ==
Key

- Q = Qualifier
- WC = Wild card
- LL = Lucky loser
- Alt = Alternate
- ITF = ITF entry
- PR = Protected ranking
- SR = Special ranking
- SE = Special exempt
- JE = Junior exempt
- JR = Junior Accelerator Programme entrant
- CO = College Accelerator Programme entrant
- NG = Next Gen Accelerator Program entrant
- w/o = Walkover
- r = Retired
- d = Defaulted

=== Finals ===
Semifinals
(Netherlands) Jacco Eltingh (Netherlands) Paul Haarhuis	4	7	7
(Canada) Grant Connell (United States) Patrick Galbraith	6	6	5
(South Africa) David Adams (Russia) Andrei Olhovskiy	2	5
(Australia) Todd Woodbridge (Australia) Mark Woodforde	6	7

Final
(Netherlands) Jacco Eltingh (Netherlands) Paul Haarhuis	7	7	6
(Australia) Todd Woodbridge (Australia) Mark Woodforde	6^{4}	6^{5}	4

=== Group A ===
	(Australia) Woodbridge (Australia) Woodforde	(Netherlands) Nijssen (Czechoslovakia) Suk	(Netherlands) Eltingh (Netherlands) Haarhuis	(Spain) Casal (Spain) Sánchez	RR; W?L	Set; W?L	Game; W?L	Standings
(Australia) Todd Woodbridge (Australia) Mark Woodforde		6–7, 6–3, 6–2	3–6, 4–6	6–3, 6–3	2–1	4–3	37–30	2
(Netherlands) Tom Nijssen (Czechoslovakia) Cyril Suk	7–6, 3–6, 2–6		3–6, 7–6, 1–6	3–6, 7–6, 6–7	0–3	3–6	39–55	4
(Netherlands) Jacco Eltingh (Netherlands) Paul Haarhuis	6–3, 6–4	6–3, 6–7, 6–1		6–2, 6–4	3–0	6–1	42–24	1
(Spain) Sergio Casal (Spain) Emilio Sánchez	3–6, 3–6	6–3, 6–7, 7–6	2–6, 4–6		1–2	2–5	31–40	3

Standings are determined by: 1. number of wins; 2. number of matches; 3. in two-players-ties, head-to-head records; 4. in three-players-ties, percentage of sets won, or of games won; 5. steering-committee decision.

=== Group B ===
	(South Africa) Adams (Russia) Olhovskiy	(United States) Jensen (United States) Jensen	(Canada) Connell (United States) Galbraith	(Australia) Kratzmann (Australia) Masur	RR; W?L	Set; W?L	Game; W?L	Standings
(South Africa) David Adams (Russia) Andrei Olhovskiy		6–3, 6–4	6–3, 3–6, 6–3	7–6, 7–6	3–0	6–1	41–31	1
(United States) Luke Jensen (United States) Murphy Jensen	3–6, 4–6		0–6, 0–6	6–7, 7–5, 2–6	0–3	1–6	22–42	4
(Canada) Grant Connell (United States) Patrick Galbraith	3–6, 6–3, 3–6	6–0, 6–0		6–4, 6–4	2–1	5–2	36–23	2
(Australia) Mark Kratzmann (Australia) Wally Masur	6–7, 6–7	7–6, 5–7, 6–2	4–6, 4–6		1–2	2–5	38–41	3

Standings are determined by: 1. number of wins; 2. number of matches; 3. in two-players-ties, head-to-head records; 4. in three-players-ties, percentage of sets won, or of games won; 5. steering-committee decision.
