= 1988 Nabisco Masters – Doubles =

Doubles
- 1988 Nabisco Masters

Final
- Champion: (United States) Rick Leach (United States) Jim Pugh
- Runner-up: (Spain) Sergio Casal (Spain) Emilio Sánchez
- Score: 6–4, 6–3, 2–6, 6–0

Details
- Draw: 8

Events
Singles	Doubles
← 1987 ·	ATP Finals	· 1989 →

Rick Leach and Jim Pugh defeated Sergio Casal and Emilio Sánchez in the final, 6–4, 6–3, 2–6, 6–0 to win the doubles tennis title at the 1988 Masters Grand Prix.

Tomáš Šmíd and Miloslav Mečíř were the reigning champions, but did not compete this year.

== Draw ==
Key

- Q = Qualifier
- WC = Wild card
- LL = Lucky loser
- Alt = Alternate
- ITF = ITF entry
- PR = Protected ranking
- SR = Special ranking
- SE = Special exempt
- JE = Junior exempt
- JR = Junior Accelerator Programme entrant
- CO = College Accelerator Programme entrant
- NG = Next Gen Accelerator Program entrant
- w/o = Walkover
- r = Retired
- d = Defaulted

=== Finals ===
Semifinals
(United States) Rick Leach (United States) Jim Pugh	7	6	6
(Mexico) Jorge Lozano (United States) Todd Witsken	6	1	2
(Australia) John Fitzgerald (Sweden) Anders Järryd	5	0	2
(Spain) Sergio Casal (Spain) Emilio Sánchez	7	6	6

Final
(United States) Rick Leach (United States) Jim Pugh	6	6	2	6
(Spain) Sergio Casal (Spain) Emilio Sánchez	4	3	6	0

=== Group A ===
	(United States) Leach (United States) Pugh	(South Africa) Aldrich (South Africa) Visser	(United States) Davis (Australia) Drewett	(Australia) Fitzgerald (Sweden) Järryd	RR; W–L	Set; W–L	Game; W–L	Standings
(United States) Rick Leach (United States) Jim Pugh		6–4, 6–4, 6–3	6–4, 6–4, 6–7, 6–1	1–6, 2–6, 4–6	2–1	6–4	49–45	2
(South Africa) Pieter Aldrich (South Africa) Danie Visser	4–6, 4–6, 3–6		6–3, 7–6, 6–4	4–6, 4–6, 7–6, 3–6	1–2	4–6	48–55	3
(United States) Marty Davis (Australia) Brad Drewett	4–6, 4–6, 7–6, 1–6	3–6, 6–7, 4–6		4–6, 7–6, 5–7, 3–6	0–3	2–9	48–68	4
(Australia) John Fitzgerald (Sweden) Anders Järryd	6–1, 6–2, 6–4	6–4, 6–4, 6–7, 6–3	6–4, 6–7, 7–5, 6–3		3–0	9–2	67–44	1

Standings are determined by: 1. number of wins; 2. number of matches; 3. in two-players-ties, head-to-head records; 4. in three-players-ties, percentage of sets won, or of games won; 5. steering-committee decision.

=== Group B ===
	(Spain) Casal (Spain) Sánchez	(New Zealand) Evernden (United States) Kriek	(United States) Flach (United States) Seguso	(Mexico) Lozano (United States) Witsken	RR; W–L	Set; W–L	Game; W–L	Standings
(Spain) Sergio Casal (Spain) Emilio Sánchez		4–6, 6–4, 7–6, 6–3	6–2, 6–2, 5–7, 1–6, 7–6	4–6, 6–7, 1–6	2–1	6–6	59–61	2
(New Zealand) Kelly Evernden (United States) Johan Kriek	6–4, 4–6, 6–7, 3–6		4–6, 7–6, 1–6, 2–6	6–4, 6–3, 2–6, 6–4	1–2	5–7	53–64	4
(United States) Ken Flach (United States) Robert Seguso	2–6, 2–6, 7–5, 6–1, 6–7	6–4, 6–7, 6–1, 6–2		2–6, 6–2, 6–2, 3–6, 6–7	1–2	7–7	70–62	3
(Mexico) Jorge Lozano (United States) Todd Witsken	6–4, 7–6, 6–1	4–6, 3–6, 6–2,4–6	6–2, 2–6, 2–6, 6–3, 7–6		2–1	6–5	59–54	1

Standings are determined by: 1. number of wins; 2. number of matches; 3. in two-players-ties, head-to-head records; 4. in three-players-ties, percentage of sets won, or of games won; 5. steering-committee decision.
