= 1994 ATP Tour World Championships =

Tennis tournament

- Date: 14–20 November (singles); 21–27 November (doubles)
- Edition: 25th (singles) / 21st (doubles)
- Category: Tour Championships
- Prize money: $3,000,000
- Surface: Carpet / indoor
- Location: Frankfurt, Germany (singles); Jakarta, Indonesia (doubles)
- Venue: Frankfurt Festhalle (singles)

Champions

Singles
- (United States) Pete Sampras

Doubles
- (Sweden) Jan Apell / (Sweden) Jonas Björkman
← 1993 ·	ATP Finals	· 1995 →

The 1994 ATP Tour World Championships (also known for the singles event as the IBM-ATP Tour World Championship for sponsorship reasons) were men's tennis tournaments played on indoor carpet courts. It was the 25th edition of the year-end singles championships, the 21st edition of the year-end doubles championships, and both were part of the 1994 ATP Tour. The singles event took place at the Frankfurt Festhalle in Frankfurt, Germany, from November 14 through November 20, 1994, and the doubles event in Jakarta, Indonesia, from November 21 through November 27, 1994. Pete Sampras won the singles title.

== Champions ==
=== Singles ===
(United States) Pete Sampras defeated (Germany) Boris Becker, 4–6, 6–3, 7–5, 6–4

- It was Pete Sampras' 10th title of the year, and his 31st overall. It was his 2nd year-end championships title.

=== Doubles ===
(Sweden) Jan Apell / (Sweden) Jonas Björkman defeated (Australia) Todd Woodbridge / (Australia) Mark Woodforde 6–4, 4–6, 4–6, 7–6^{(7–5)}, 7–6^{(8–6)}.
