= 1981 Volvo Masters =

- Date: January 13–17, 1982
- Edition: 12th
- Category: Masters
- Draw: 8S / 4D
- Prize money: $400,000
- Surface: Carpet / indoor
- Location: New York City, US
- Venue: Madison Square Garden

Champions

Singles
- (Czechoslovakia) Ivan Lendl

Doubles
- (United States) Peter Fleming / (United States) John McEnroe
- ATP Finals

The 1981 Masters (also known as the 1981 Volvo Masters for sponsorship reasons) was a men's tennis tournament played on indoor carpet courts in Madison Square Garden, New York City, United States from January 13 through January 17, 1982. It was the year-end championship of the 1981 Volvo Grand Prix tour. Ivan Lendl won the singles title.

== Finals ==
=== Singles ===
(Czechoslovakia) Ivan Lendl defeated (United States) Vitas Gerulaitis, 6–7^{(5–7)}, 2–6, 7–6^{(8–6)}, 6–2, 6–4.

=== Doubles ===
(United States) Peter Fleming and (United States) John McEnroe defeated (South Africa) Kevin Curren and (United States) Steve Denton 6–3, 6–3.
