= 1983 Volvo Masters =

- Date: January 10–15, 1984
- Edition: 14th
- Category: Masters
- Draw: 12S / 6D
- Prize money: $400,000
- Surface: Carpet / indoor
- Location: New York City, US
- Venue: Madison Square Garden

Champions

Singles
- (United States) John McEnroe

Doubles
- (United States) Peter Fleming / (United States) John McEnroe
- ATP Finals

The 1983 Masters (also known as the 1983 Volvo Masters for sponsorship reasons) was a men's tennis tournament played on indoor carpet courts in Madison Square Garden in New York City between 10 January and 15 January 1984. It was the year-end championship of the 1983 Volvo Grand Prix tour. John McEnroe won the singles title.

== Finals ==
=== Singles ===
(United States) John McEnroe defeated (Czechoslovakia) Ivan Lendl, 6–3, 6–4, 6–4

=== Doubles ===
(United States) Peter Fleming / (United States) John McEnroe defeated (Czechoslovakia) Pavel Složil / (Czechoslovakia) Tomáš Šmíd 6–2, 6–2

== See also ==
- Lendl–McEnroe rivalry
