= 1989 Nabisco Masters – Doubles =

Doubles
- 1989 Nabisco Masters
- 1988 Champions: (United States) Rick Leach (United States) Jim Pugh

Final
- Champions: (United States) Jim Grabb (United States) Patrick McEnroe
- Runners-up: (Australia) John Fitzgerald (Sweden) Anders Järryd
- Score: 7–5, 7–6, 5–7, 6–3

Details
- Draw: 8

Events
Singles	Doubles
← 1988 ·	Nabisco Masters	· 1990 →

Jim Grabb and Patrick McEnroe defeated John Fitzgerald and Anders Järryd in the final, 7–5, 7–6, 5–7, 6–3 to win the doubles tennis title at the 1989 Masters Grand Prix.

Rick Leach and Jim Pugh were the defending champions, but were eliminated in the round-robin stage.

== Draw ==
Key

- Q = Qualifier
- WC = Wild card
- LL = Lucky loser
- Alt = Alternate
- ITF = ITF entry
- PR = Protected ranking
- SR = Special ranking
- SE = Special exempt
- JE = Junior exempt
- JR = Junior Accelerator Programme entrant
- CO = College Accelerator Programme entrant
- NG = Next Gen Accelerator Program entrant
- w/o = Walkover
- r = Retired
- d = Defaulted

=== Finals ===
Semifinals
(United States) Jim Grabb (United States) Patrick McEnroe	6	6	6
(South Africa) Pieter Aldrich (South Africa) Danie Visser	4	1	3
(Australia) John Fitzgerald (Sweden) Anders Järryd	7	7	6
(Australia) Darren Cahill (Australia) Mark Kratzmann	6	6	3

Final
(United States) Jim Grabb (United States) Patrick McEnroe	7	7	5	6
(Australia) John Fitzgerald (Sweden) Anders Järryd	5	6	7	3

=== Playoffs ===
==== Fifth place ====
Fifth Place Playoff
(United States) Rick Leach (United States) Jim Pugh	6	3	5
(Mexico) Jorge Lozano (United States) Todd Witsken	4	6	7

==== Seventh place ====
Seventh Place Playoff
(United States) Jim Courier (United States) Pete Sampras	6	6
(United States) Paul Annacone (South Africa) Christo van Rensburg	4	3

== Round robin ==
=== Red group ===
	(Australia) Cahill (Australia) Kratzmann	(United States) Courier (United States) Sampras	(United States) Grabb (United States) McEnroe	(United States) Leach (United States) Pugh	RR; W–L	Set; W–L	Game; W–L	Standings
(Australia) Darren Cahill (Australia) Mark Kratzmann		6–2, 7–6, 7–6	6–7, 1–6, 4–6	6–3, 7–6, 7–6	2–1	6–3	50–44	2
(United States) Jim Courier (United States) Pete Sampras	2–6, 6–7, 6–7		2–6, 3–6, 3–6	3–6, 0–6, 3–6	0–3	0–9	24–55	4
(United States) Jim Grabb (United States) Patrick McEnroe	7–6, 6–1, 6–4	6–2, 6–3, 6–3		6–4, 6–2, 6–7, 6–2	3–0	9–1	61–34	1
(United States) Rick Leach (United States) Jim Pugh	3–6, 6–7, 6–7	6–3, 6–0, 6–3	4–6, 2–6, 7–6, 2–6		1–2	4–6	48–45	3

Standings are determined by: 1. number of wins; 2. number of matches; 3. in two-players-ties, head-to-head records; 4. in three-players-ties, percentage of sets won, or of games won; 5. steering-committee decision.

=== Blue group ===
	(Australia) Fitzgerald (Sweden) Järryd	(United States) Annacone (South Africa) van Rensburg	(South Africa) Aldrich (South Africa) Visser	(Mexico) Lozano (United States) Witsken	RR; W–L	Set; W–L	Game; W–L	Standings
(Australia) John Fitzgerald (Sweden) Anders Järryd		6–3, 6–7, 6–1, 7–5	6–2, 7–6, 7–6	6–3, 3–6, 7–5, 4–6, 6–1	3–0	9–3	71–51	1
(United States) Paul Annacone (South Africa) C van Rensburg	3–6, 7–6, 1–6, 7–5		4–6, 2–6, 2–6	7–6, 6–7, 4–6, 4–6	0–3	2–9	45–68	4
(South Africa) Pieter Aldrich (South Africa) Danie Visser	2–6, 6–7, 6–7	6–4, 6–2, 6–2		6–2, 7–6, 6–3	2–1	6–3	51–39	2
(Mexico) Jorge Lozano (United States) Todd Witsken	3–6, 6–3, 5–7, 6–4, 1–6	6–7, 7–6, 6–4, 6–4	2–6, 6–7, 3–6		1–2	4–6	57–62	3

Standings are determined by: 1. number of wins; 2. number of matches; 3. in two-players-ties, head-to-head records; 4. in three-players-ties, percentage of sets won, or of games won; 5. steering-committee decision.
