= 1988 Nabisco Masters =

- Date: November 28 – December 2
- Edition: 19th
- Category: Masters
- Draw: 8S / 8D
- Prize money: $400,000
- Surface: Carpet / indoor
- Location: New York City, US
- Venue: Madison Square Garden

Champions

Singles
- (West Germany) Boris Becker

Doubles
- (United States) Rick Leach / (United States) Jim Pugh
- ATP Finals

The 1988 Masters (also known as the 1988 Nabisco Masters for sponsorship reasons) was a men's tennis tournament played on indoor carpet courts in Madison Square Garden, New York City, in the United States between 28 November and 2 December 1988. Whilst the doubles event was held at the Royal Albert Hall, London, Great Britain. It was the year-end championship of the 1988 Nabisco Grand Prix. Boris Becker won the singles title.

== Finals ==
=== Singles ===
(West Germany) Boris Becker defeated (Czechoslovakia) Ivan Lendl, 5–7, 7–6^{(7–5)}, 3–6, 6–2, 7–6^{(7–5)}

- It was Becker's 7th singles title of the year and the 19th of his career.

=== Doubles ===
(United States) Rick Leach / (United States) Jim Pugh defeated (Spain) Sergio Casal / (Spain) Emilio Sánchez 6–4, 6–3, 2–6, 6–0

== See also ==
- 1988 Virginia Slims Championships
