= 1979 Colgate-Palmolive Masters – Doubles =

Doubles
- 1979 Colgate-Palmolive Masters

Final
- Champion: (United States) Peter Fleming (United States) John McEnroe
- Runner-up: (Poland) Wojciech Fibak (Netherlands) Tom Okker
- Score: 6–3, 7–6, 6–1

Events
Singles	Doubles
← 1978 ·	Colgate-Palmolive Masters	· 1980 →

Defending champions Peter Fleming and John McEnroe successfully defended their title, defeating Wojciech Fibak and Tom Okker in a rematch of the previous year's final, 6–3, 7–6, 6–1 to win the doubles tennis title at the 1979 Masters Grand Prix.

== Knockout stage ==
=== Key ===
- Q = Qualifier
- WC = Wild card
- LL = Lucky loser
- Alt = Alternate
- SE = Special exempt
- PR = Protected ranking
- ITF = ITF entry
- JE = Junior exempt
- w/o = Walkover
- r = Retired
- d = Defaulted
- SR = Special ranking

=== Draw ===
Semifinals
(United States) Peter Fleming (United States) John McEnroe	7	6	6
(Australia) Mark Edmondson (Australia) John Marks	6	7	3
(Poland) Wojciech Fibak (Netherlands) Tom Okker	6	7
(United States) Marty Riessen (United States) Sherwood Stewart	2	6

Final
(United States) Peter Fleming (United States) John McEnroe	6	7	6
(Poland) Wojciech Fibak (Netherlands) Tom Okker	3	6	1
