= 1980 Volvo Masters – Doubles =

Doubles
- 1980 Volvo Masters

Final
- Champion: (United States) Peter Fleming (United States) John McEnroe
- Runner-up: (Australia) Peter McNamara (Australia) Paul McNamee
- Score: 6–4, 6–3

Events
Singles	Doubles
← 1979 ·	Volvo Masters	· 1981 →

Two-time defending champions Peter Fleming and John McEnroe successfully defended their title, defeating Peter McNamara and Paul McNamee in the final, 6–4, 6–3 to win the doubles tennis title at the 1980 Masters Grand Prix.

== Knockout stage ==
=== Key ===
- Q = Qualifier
- WC = Wild card
- LL = Lucky loser
- Alt = Alternate
- SE = Special exempt
- PR = Protected ranking
- ITF = ITF entry
- JE = Junior exempt
- w/o = Walkover
- r = Retired
- d = Defaulted
- SR = Special ranking

=== Draw ===
Semifinals
(United States) Peter Fleming (United States) John McEnroe	6	6
(South Africa) Kevin Curren (United States) Steve Denton	2	2
(Australia) Peter McNamara (Australia) Paul McNamee	0	6	6
(United States) Bob Lutz (United States) Stan Smith	6	3	4

Final
(United States) Peter Fleming (United States) John McEnroe	6	6
(Australia) Peter McNamara (Australia) Paul McNamee	4	3
