= 1984 Volvo Masters =

- Date: January 8–13, 1985
- Edition: 15th
- Category: Masters
- Draw: 12S / 6D
- Prize money: $400,000
- Surface: Carpet / indoor
- Location: New York City, US
- Venue: Madison Square Garden

Champions

Singles
- (United States) John McEnroe

Doubles
- (United States) Peter Fleming / (United States) John McEnroe
- ATP Finals

The 1984 Masters (also known as the 1984 Volvo Masters for sponsorship reasons) was a men's tennis tournament held in Madison Square Garden, New York City, United States between 8 January and 13 January 1985. It was the year-end championship of the 1984 Volvo Grand Prix tour. First-seeded John McEnroe won the singles title.

== Finals ==
=== Singles ===
(United States) John McEnroe defeated (Czechoslovakia) Ivan Lendl 7–5, 6–0, 6–4

- It was McEnroe's 13th singles title of the year and the 59th of his career.

=== Doubles ===
(United States) Peter Fleming / (United States) John McEnroe defeated (Australia) Mark Edmondson / (United States) Sherwood Stewart 6–3, 6–1

== See also ==
- Lendl–McEnroe rivalry
