= 1983 Volvo Masters – Doubles =

Doubles
- 1983 Volvo Masters

Final
- Champion: (United States) Peter Fleming (United States) John McEnroe
- Runner-up: (Czechoslovakia) Pavel Složil (Czechoslovakia) Tomáš Šmíd
- Score: 6–2, 6–2

Details
- Draw: 6

Events
Singles	Doubles
- Volvo Masters

Five-time defending champions Peter Fleming and John McEnroe successfully defended their title, defeating Pavel Složil and Tomáš Šmíd in the final, 6–2, 6–2 to win the doubles tennis title at the 1983 Masters Grand Prix.

== Draw ==
Key

- Q = Qualifier
- WC = Wild card
- LL = Lucky loser
- Alt = Alternate
- ITF = ITF entry
- PR = Protected ranking
- SR = Special ranking
- SE = Special exempt
- JE = Junior exempt
- JR = Junior Accelerator Programme entrant
- CO = College Accelerator Programme entrant
- NG = Next Gen Accelerator Program entrant
- w/o = Walkover
- r = Retired
- d = Defaulted

=== Finals ===
Quarterfinals				Semifinals					Final
				1	(United States) Peter Fleming (United States) John McEnroe	6	6
(Australia) Mark Edmondson (United States) Sherwood Stewart	5	6	6		(Australia) Mark Edmondson (United States) Sherwood Stewart	3	4
(Brazil) Carlos Kirmayr (Brazil) Cássio Motta	7	1	4						1	(United States) Peter Fleming (United States) John McEnroe	6	6
(Czechoslovakia) Pavel Složil (Czechoslovakia) Tomáš Šmíd	7	7								(Czechoslovakia) Pavel Složil (Czechoslovakia) Tomáš Šmíd	2	2
(United States) Tom Gullikson (United States) Tim Gullikson	6	6			(Czechoslovakia) Pavel Složil (Czechoslovakia) Tomáš Šmíd	1	7	7
				2	(Sweden) Anders Järryd (Sweden) Hans Simonsson	6	6	5
