= 1987 Nabisco Masters – Doubles =

Doubles
- 1987 Nabisco Masters

Final
- Champion: (Czechoslovakia) Tomáš Šmíd (Czechoslovakia) Miloslav Mečíř
- Runner-up: (United States) Ken Flach (United States) Robert Seguso
- Score: 6–4, 7–5, 6–7, 6–3.

Events
Singles	Doubles
← 1986 ·	Nabisco Masters	· 1988 →

Tomáš Šmíd and Miloslav Mečíř defeated Ken Flach and Robert Seguso in the final, 6–4, 7–5, 6–7, 6–3 to win the doubles tennis title at the 1987 Masters Grand Prix.

Stefan Edberg and Anders Järryd were the two-time defending champions, but were defeated in the semifinals by Šmíd and Mečíř.

== Draw ==
Key

- Q = Qualifier
- WC = Wild card
- LL = Lucky loser
- Alt = Alternate
- ITF = ITF entry
- PR = Protected ranking
- SR = Special ranking
- SE = Special exempt
- JE = Junior exempt
- JR = Junior Accelerator Programme entrant
- CO = College Accelerator Programme entrant
- NG = Next Gen Accelerator Program entrant
- w/o = Walkover
- r = Retired
- d = Defaulted

=== Finals ===
Semifinals
(Sweden) Stefan Edberg (Sweden) Anders Järryd	6	3	6	3	4
(Czechoslovakia) Tomáš Šmíd (Czechoslovakia) Miloslav Mečíř	3	6	2	6	6
(United States) Ken Flach (United States) Robert Seguso	6	6	3	5	7
(Spain) Sergio Casal (Spain) Emilio Sánchez	1	2	6	7	5

Final
(Czechoslovakia) Tomáš Šmíd (Czechoslovakia) Miloslav Mečíř	6	7	6	6
(United States) Ken Flach (United States) Robert Seguso	4	5	7	3

=== Fifth place ===
Fifth Place Playoff
(United States) Paul Annacone (South Africa) Christo van Rensburg	6	3	6
(United States) Gary Donnelly (United States) Peter Fleming	1	6	1

=== Red group ===
	(Sweden) Edberg (Sweden) Järryd	(Australia) Doohan (Australia) Warder	(United States) Annacone (South Africa) van Rensburg	(Czechoslovakia) Šmid (Czechoslovakia) Mečíř	RR; W–L	Set; W–L	Game; W–L	Standings
(Sweden) Stefan Edberg (Sweden) Anders Järryd		5–7, 6–3, 7–6, 6–2	7–6, 6–3, 6–2	6–2, 6–7, 6–1, 6–7, 5–7	2–1	8–4	72–53	2
(Australia) Peter Doohan (Australia) Laurie Warder	7–5, 3–6, 6–7, 2–6		6–7, 6–7, 6–2, 6–4, 6–7	6–7, 4–6, 6–4, 2–6	0–3	4–9	66–74	4
(United States) Paul Annacone (South Africa) Christo van Rensburg	6–7, 3–6, 2–6	7–6, 7–6, 2–6, 4–6, 7–6		5–7, 6–4, 6–2, 3–6, 4–6	1–2	5–8	62–73	3
(Czechoslovakia) Tomáš Šmíd (Czechoslovakia) Miloslav Mečíř	2–6, 7–6, 1–6, 7–6, 7–5	6–4, 3–6, 6–3, 7–5	7–5, 4–6, 2–6, 6–3, 6–4		3–0	9–5	71–71	1

Standings are determined by: 1. number of wins; 2. number of matches; 3. in two-players-ties, head-to-head records; 4. in three-players-ties, percentage of sets won, or of games won; 5. steering-committee decision.

=== Blue group ===
	(United States) Flach (United States) Seguso	(United States) Donnelly (United States) Fleming	(Spain) Casal (Spain) Sánchez	(United States) Davis (United States) Pate	RR; W–L	Set; W–L	Game; W–L	Standings
(United States) Ken Flach (United States) Robert Seguso		3–6, 6–7, 1–6	6–3, 6–3 6–2	6–3, 6–2, 6–4	2–1	6–3	46–36	1
(United States) Gary Donnelly (United States) Peter Fleming	6–3, 7–6, 6–1		3–6, 4–6, 4–6	6–3, 3–6, 6–3, 6–4	2–1	6–4	51–44	3
(Spain) Sergio Casal (Spain) Emilio Sánchez	3–6, 3–6, 2–6	6–3, 6–4, 6–4		7–6, 6–4, 7–6	2–1	6–3	46–45	2
(United States) Scott Davis (United States) David Pate	3–6, 2–6, 4–6	3–6, 6–3, 3–6, 4–6	6–7, 4–6, 6–7		0–3	1–9	41–59	4

Standings are determined by: 1. number of wins; 2. number of matches; 3. in two-players-ties, head-to-head records; 4. in three-players-ties, percentage of sets won, or of games won; 5. steering-committee decision.
