= 1980 Volvo Masters =

- Date: January 14–18, 1981
- Edition: 11th
- Category: Masters
- Draw: 8S / 4D
- Prize money: $400,000
- Surface: Carpet / indoor
- Location: New York City, U.S.
- Venue: Madison Square Garden
- Attendance: 132,174

Champions

Singles
- (Sweden) Björn Borg

Doubles
- (United States) Peter Fleming / (United States) John McEnroe
- ATP Finals

The 1980 Masters (also known as the 1980 Volvo Masters for sponsorship reasons) was a men's tennis tournament played on indoor carpet courts and held at the Madison Square Garden, in New York City, New York, United States from January 14 through January 18, 1981. It was the year-end championship of the 1980 Volvo Grand Prix tour. First-seeded Björn Borg won the singles title and earned $100,000 first-prize money.

== Finals ==
=== Singles ===
(Sweden) Björn Borg defeated (Czechoslovakia) Ivan Lendl, 6–4, 6–2, 6–2

- It was Borg's 1st singles title of the year and the 63rd of his career.

=== Doubles ===
(United States) Peter Fleming / (United States) John McEnroe defeated (Australia) Peter McNamara / (Australia) Paul McNamee 6–4, 6–3

== Prize money ==
| Event | W | F | SF | 5th–6th | 7th–8th |
| Singles | $100,000 | $64,000 | $45,000 | $20,000 | $13,000 |
