= 1994 ATP Tour World Championships – Doubles =

Doubles
- 1994 ATP Tour World Championships

Final
- Champion: (Sweden) Jan Apell (Sweden) Jonas Björkman
- Runner-up: (Australia) Todd Woodbridge (Australia) Mark Woodforde
- Score: 6–4, 4–6, 4–6, 7–6^{(7–5)}, 7–6^{(8–6)}

Details
- Draw: 8

Events
Singles	Doubles
- ATP Tour World Championships

Jan Apell and Jonas Björkman defeated Todd Woodbridge and Mark Woodforde in the final, 6–4, 4–6, 4–6, 7–6^{(7–5)}, 7–6^{(8–6)} to win the doubles tennis title at the 1994 ATP Tour World Championships.

Jacco Eltingh and Paul Haarhuis were the defending champions, but were defeated by Woodbridge and Woodforde in the semifinals.

== Draw ==
Key

- Q = Qualifier
- WC = Wild card
- LL = Lucky loser
- Alt = Alternate
- ITF = ITF entry
- PR = Protected ranking
- SR = Special ranking
- SE = Special exempt
- JE = Junior exempt
- JR = Junior Accelerator Programme entrant
- CO = College Accelerator Programme entrant
- NG = Next Gen Accelerator Program entrant
- w/o = Walkover
- r = Retired
- d = Defaulted

=== Finals ===
Semifinals
(Sweden) Jan Apell (Sweden) Jonas Björkman	6	6
(South Africa) David Adams (Russia) Andrei Olhovskiy	3	2
(Netherlands) Jacco Eltingh (Netherlands) Paul Haarhuis	7	4	4
(Australia) Todd Woodbridge (Australia) Mark Woodforde	6	6	6

Final
(Sweden) Jan Apell (Sweden) Jonas Björkman	6	4	4	7^{7}	7^{8}
(Australia) Todd Woodbridge (Australia) Mark Woodforde	4	6	6	6^{5}	6^{6}

=== Group A ===
	(Sweden) Apell (Sweden) Björkman	(Canada) Connell (United States) Galbraith	(Netherlands) Eltingh (Netherlands) Haarhuis	(Spain) Casal (Spain) Sánchez	RR; W?L	Set; W?L	Game; W?L	Standings
(Sweden) Jan Apell (Sweden) Jonas Björkman		3–6, 6–7	4–6, 6–4, 6–2	6–2, 7–6	2–1	4–3	38–33	1
(Canada) Grant Connell (United States) Patrick Galbraith	6–3, 7–6		7–6, 5–7, 4–6	6–3, 6–7, 2–6	1–2	4–4	43–44	4
(Netherlands) Jacco Eltingh (Netherlands) Paul Haarhuis	6–4, 4–6, 2–6	6–7, 7–5, 6–4		6–3, 7–6	2–1	5–3	44–41	2
(Spain) Sergio Casal (Spain) Emilio Sánchez	2–6, 6–7	3–6, 7–6, 6–2	3–6, 6–7		1–2	2–5	33–40	3

Standings are determined by: 1. number of wins; 2. number of matches; 3. in two-players-ties, head-to-head records; 4. in three-players-ties, percentage of sets won, or of games won; 5. steering-committee decision.

=== Group B ===
	(South Africa) Adams (Russia) Olhovskiy	(Zimbabwe) Black (United States) Stark	(Australia) Woodbridge (Australia) Woodforde	(Netherlands) Nijssen (Czechoslovakia) Suk	RR; W?L	Set; W?L	Game; W?L	Standings
(South Africa) David Adams (Russia) Andrei Olhovskiy		5–7, 6–3, 7–6	2–6, 4–6	6–3, 7–6	2–1	4–3	37–37	2
(Zimbabwe) Byron Black (United States) Jonathan Stark	7–5, 3–6, 6–7		3–6, 4–6	6–1, 7–6	1–2	3–4	38–37	3
(Australia) Todd Woodbridge (Australia) Mark Woodforde	6–2, 6–4	6–3, 6–4		6–2, 6–4	3–0	6–0	36–19	1
(Netherlands) Tom Nijssen (Czechoslovakia) Cyril Suk	3–6, 6–7	1–6, 6–7	2–6, 4–6		0–3	0–6	22–38	4

Standings are determined by: 1. number of wins; 2. number of matches; 3. in two-players-ties, head-to-head records; 4. in three-players-ties, percentage of sets won, or of games won; 5. steering-committee decision.
