= 1979 Colgate-Palmolive Masters =

- Date: January 9–13, 1980
- Edition: 10th
- Category: Masters
- Draw: 8S / 4D
- Prize money: $400,000
- Surface: Carpet / Indoor
- Location: New York City, US
- Venue: Madison Square Garden

Champions

Singles
- (Sweden) Björn Borg

Doubles
- (United States) Peter Fleming / (United States) John McEnroe
- ATP Finals

The 1979 Masters, also known as the Colgate-Palmolive Masters for sponsorship reasons, was a men's tennis tournament held in Madison Square Garden, New York City, United States between 9 January and 13 January 1980. It was the year-end championship of the 1979 Colgate-Palmolive Grand Prix tour. Björn Borg won the singles title.

== Finals ==
=== Singles ===
(Sweden) Björn Borg defeated (United States) Vitas Gerulaitis, 6–2, 6–2

- It was Borg's 13th singles title of the year and 52nd of his career.

=== Doubles ===
(United States) Peter Fleming / (United States) John McEnroe defeated (Poland) Wojciech Fibak / (Netherlands) Tom Okker 6–3, 7–6, 6–1

== See also ==
- 1979 World Championship Tennis Finals
