= 1996 ATP Tour World Championships =

Tour World Championships

- Date: 19–24 November (singles); 13–17 November (doubles)
- Edition: 27th (singles) / 23rd (doubles)
- Category: Tour Championships
- Prize money: $3,300,000
- Surface: Carpet / indoor
- Location: Hanover, Germany; Hartford, Connecticut, US
- Venue: EXPO 2000 Tennis Dome (singles); Hartford Civic Center (doubles)

Champions

Singles
- (United States) Pete Sampras

Doubles
- (Australia) Todd Woodbridge / (Australia) Mark Woodforde
- ATP Finals

The 1996 ATP Tour World Championships and the Phoenix ATP Tour World Doubles Championships were men's tennis tournaments played on indoor carpet courts. It was the 27th edition of the year-end singles championships, the 23rd edition of the year-end doubles championships and both were part of the 1996 ATP Tour. The singles tournament took place at the EXPO 2000 Tennis Dome in Hanover in Germany from November 19 through November 24, 1996, while the doubles tournament took place at the Hartford Civic Center in Hartford, Connecticut, in the United States from November 13 through November 17, 1996.

== Champions ==
=== Singles ===
(United States) Pete Sampras defeated (Germany) Boris Becker 3–6, 7–6^{(7–5)}, 7–6^{(7–4)}, 6–7^{(11–13)}, 6–4

- It was Sampras' 8th title of the year and the 45th of his career. It was his 3rd year-end championships title.

=== Doubles ===
(Australia) Todd Woodbridge / (Australia) Mark Woodforde defeated (Canada) Sébastien Lareau / (United States) Alex O'Brien 6–4, 5–7, 6–2, 7–6^{(7–3)}.

- It was Woodbridge's 12th title of the year and the 52nd of his career. It was Woodforde's 13th title of the year and the 56th of his career.
