= 1984 Volvo Masters – Doubles =

Doubles
- 1984 Volvo Masters

Final
- Champion: (United States) Peter Fleming (United States) John McEnroe
- Runner-up: (Australia) Mark Edmondson (United States) Sherwood Stewart
- Score: 6–3, 6–1

Details
- Draw: 6

Events
Singles	Doubles
- Volvo Masters

Six-time defending champions Peter Fleming and John McEnroe successfully defended their title, defeating Mark Edmondson and Sherwood Stewart in the final, 6–3, 6–1 to win the doubles tennis title at the 1984 Masters Grand Prix. Their seven consecutive titles at the event remains a record.

== Draw ==
Key

- Q = Qualifier
- WC = Wild card
- LL = Lucky loser
- Alt = Alternate
- ITF = ITF entry
- PR = Protected ranking
- SR = Special ranking
- SE = Special exempt
- JE = Junior exempt
- JR = Junior Accelerator Programme entrant
- CO = College Accelerator Programme entrant
- NG = Next Gen Accelerator Program entrant
- w/o = Walkover
- r = Retired
- d = Defaulted

=== Finals ===
Quarterfinals			Semifinals					Final
			1	(Australia) Mark Edmondson (United States) Sherwood Stewart	6	4	6
(United States) Ken Flach (United States) Robert Seguso	4	3		(South Africa) Kevin Curren (United States) Steve Denton	3	6	2
(South Africa) Kevin Curren (United States) Steve Denton	6	6						1	(Australia) Mark Edmondson (United States) Sherwood Stewart	3	1
(Switzerland) Heinz Günthardt (Hungary) Balázs Taróczy	2	4						2	(United States) Peter Fleming (United States) John McEnroe	6	6
(Czechoslovakia) Pavel Složil (Czechoslovakia) Tomáš Šmíd	6	6		(Czechoslovakia) Pavel Složil (Czechoslovakia) Tomáš Šmíd	4	3
			2	(United States) Peter Fleming (United States) John McEnroe	6	6
