= 1970 Pepsi-Cola Masters – Doubles =

Doubles
- 1970 Pepsi-Cola Masters

Final
- Champions: (United States) Arthur Ashe (United States) Stan Smith
- Runners-up: (Czechoslovakia) Jan Kodeš (Australia) Rod Laver
- Score: 6–3, 6–4

Events
| Singles | Doubles |
- Pepsi-Cola Masters

Arthur Ashe and Stan Smith won the inaugural doubles tennis title at the Masters Grand Prix by defeating both teams they faced in the round-robin stage.

== Round robin ==
Key

- Q = Qualifier
- WC = Wild card
- LL = Lucky loser
- Alt = Alternate
- ITF = ITF entry
- PR = Protected ranking
- SR = Special ranking
- SE = Special exempt
- JE = Junior exempt
- JR = Junior Accelerator Programme entrant
- CO = College Accelerator Programme entrant
- NG = Next Gen Accelerator Program entrant
- w/o = Walkover
- r = Retired
- d = Defaulted

| | (United States) Ashe (United States) Smith | (Czechoslovakia) Kodeš (Australia) Laver | (Socialist Federal Republic of Yugoslavia) Franulović (Australia) Rosewall |
| (United States) Arthur Ashe (United States) Stan Smith | | 6–3, 6–4 | 6–5, 6–5 |
| (Czechoslovakia) Jan Kodeš (Australia) Rod Laver | 3–6, 4–6 | | 3–6, 6–5, 6–4 |
| (Socialist Federal Republic of Yugoslavia) Željko Franulović (Australia) Ken Rosewall | 5–6, 5–6 | 6–3, 5–6, 4–6 |

=== Standings ===
| Players | RR W-L | Sets W-L | Games W-L | Standings |
|---|---|---|---|---|
| (United States) Arthur Ashe (United States) Stan Smith | 2–0 | 4–0 | 24–17 | 1 |
| (Czechoslovakia) Jan Kodeš (Australia) Rod Laver | 1–1 | 2–5 | 22–27 | 2 |
| (Socialist Federal Republic of Yugoslavia) Željko Franulović (Australia) Ken Rosewall | 0–2 | 1–4 | 25–27 | 3 |

Standings are determined by: 1. number of wins; 2. number of matches; 3. in two-players-ties, head-to-head records; 4. in three-players-ties, percentage of sets won, or of games won; 5. steering-committee decision.
