= 1987 Nabisco Masters =

Tennis tournament

- Date: November 30 – December 4
- Edition: 18th
- Category: Masters
- Draw: 8S / 8D
- Prize money: $500,000
- Surface: Carpet / indoor
- Location: New York City, U.S.
- Venue: Madison Square Garden

Champions

Singles
- (Czechoslovakia) Ivan Lendl

Doubles
- (Czechoslovakia) Tomáš Šmíd / (Czechoslovakia) Miloslav Mečíř
- ATP Finals

The 1987 Masters (also known as the 1987 Nabisco Masters for sponsorship reasons) was a men's tennis tournament held in Madison Square Garden, New York City, United States between 30 November and 4 December 1987. Whilst the doubles event was held at the Royal Albert Hall in London, United Kingdom. It was the year-end championships for the 1987 Nabisco Grand Prix. Ivan Lendl won the singles title.

== Finals ==
=== Singles ===
(Czechoslovakia) Ivan Lendl defeated (Sweden) Mats Wilander, 6–2, 6–2, 6–3.

=== Doubles ===
(Czechoslovakia) Tomáš Šmíd / (Czechoslovakia) Miloslav Mečíř defeated (United States) Ken Flach / (United States) Robert Seguso 6–4, 7–5, 6–7, 6–3.
