= 1990 ATP Tour World Championships =

- Date: 13–18 November
- Edition: 21st
- Category: Masters
- Draw: 8S / 8D
- Prize money: $2,000,000
- Surface: Greenset hard court / indoor (S); Hard / outdoor (D)
- Location: Frankfurt, Germany (S); Gold Coast, Australia (D)
- Venue: Festhalle Frankfurt (S)

Champions

Singles
- (United States) Andre Agassi

Doubles
- (France) Guy Forget / (Switzerland) Jakob Hlasek
- ATP Finals

The 1990 ATP Tour World Championships, also known as the 1990 IBM ATP Tour World Championships for sponsorship reasons, was a men's tennis tournament played on indoor hard courts in Frankfurt, Germany. It was the 21st edition of the tournament and was held between 13–18 November 1990. Andre Agassi won the singles title.

== Finals ==
=== Singles ===
(United States) Andre Agassi defeated (Sweden) Stefan Edberg, 5–7, 7–6^{(7–5)}, 7–5, 6–2

=== Doubles ===
(France) Guy Forget / (Switzerland) Jakob Hlasek defeated (Spain) Sergio Casal / (Spain) Emilio Sánchez 6–4, 7–6^{(7–5)}, 5–7, 6–4
