= 1976 Commercial Union Assurance Masters =

- Date: December 5–12
- Edition: 7th
- Category: Masters Grand Prix
- Draw: 8S (round robin) / 4D
- Prize money: $130,000
- Surface: Carpet / indoor
- Location: Houston, Texas, United States
- Venue: The Summit

Champions

Singles
- (Spain) Manuel Orantes

Doubles
- (United States) Fred McNair / (United States) Sherwood Stewart
- ATP Finals

The 1976 Masters (also known as the 1976 Commercial Union Assurance Masters for sponsorship reasons) was a men's tennis tournament played on indoor carpet courts at The Summit in Houston in the United States. It was the 7th edition of the Masters Grand Prix and was held from December 7 through December 12, 1976. Manuel Orantes won the singles Masters title and $40,000 first-prize money.

== Finals ==
=== Singles ===
(Spain) Manuel Orantes defeated (Poland) Wojtek Fibak 5–7, 6–2, 0–6, 7–6^{(7–1)}, 6–1

- It was Orantes' 7th singles title of the year and the 29th in his career in the Open Era.

=== Doubles ===
(United States) Sherwood Stewart / (United States) Fred McNair defeated (United States) Brian Gottfried / (Mexico) Raúl Ramírez, 6–3, 5–7, 5–7, 6–4, 6–4.

== See also ==
- 1976 World Championship Tennis Finals
- 1976 WCT World Doubles
