= 1973 Commercial Union Assurance Masters =

- Date: December 4–8
- Edition: 4th
- Category: Masters Grand Prix
- Draw: 8S
- Prize money: $50,000
- Surface: Carpet / indoor
- Location: Boston, U.S.
- Venue: Hynes Auditorium

Champions

Singles
- (Romania) Ilie Năstase
- ATP Finals

The 1973 Masters (also known as the 1973 Commercial Union Assurance Masters for sponsorship reasons) was a tennis tournament played on indoor carpet courts at Hynes Auditorium in Boston, Massachusetts in the United States. Mateflex is a soft plastic, interlocking tile court, with the slower ball speed of clay but the low maintenance of a hard surface. It was the fourth edition of the Masters Grand Prix and was held from December 4 through December 8, 1973. Ilie Năstase won his third consecutive Masters title and earned $15,000 prize money.

== Finals ==
=== Singles ===
(Romania) Ilie Năstase defeated (Netherlands) Tom Okker 6–3, 7–5, 4–6, 6–3

- It was Năstase's 24th title of the year and the 58th of his career.

== See also ==
- 1973 World Championship Tennis Finals
- 1973 WCT World Doubles
