= 1972 Masters Grand Prix =

- Date: November 28 – December 2
- Edition: 3rd
- Category: Masters
- Draw: 8S
- Surface: Hard / indoor
- Location: Barcelona, Spain
- Venue: Palau Blaugrana

Champions

Singles
- (Romania) Ilie Năstase
← 1971 ·	ATP Finals	· 1973 →

The 1972 Masters was a men's tennis tournament played on indoor hard courts at Palau Blaugrana in Barcelona, Spain. It was the third edition of the Masters Grand Prix and was held from 28 November through 2 December 1972. Ilie Năstase won the title.

== Final ==
=== Singles ===
(Romania) Ilie Năstase defeated (United States) Stan Smith 6–3, 6–2, 3–6, 2–6, 6–3

- It was Năstase's 12th singles title of the year and the 24th of his career.

== See also ==
1972 World Championship Tennis Finals
