= 1982 Volvo Masters – Doubles =

Doubles
- 1982 Volvo Masters

Final
- Champion: (United States) Peter Fleming (United States) John McEnroe
- Runner-up: (United States) Sherwood Stewart (United States) Ferdi Taygan
- Score: 7–5, 6–3

Details
- Draw: 6
- Seeds: 2

Events
Singles	Doubles
- Volvo Masters

Four-time defending champions Peter Fleming and John McEnroe successfully defended their title, defeating Sherwood Stewart and Ferdi Taygan in the final, 7–5, 6–3 to win the doubles tennis title at the 1982 Masters Grand Prix.

== Seeds ==
1. (United States) Sherwood Stewart / (United States) Ferdi Taygan
2. (United States) Peter Fleming / (United States) John McEnroe

== Draw ==
Key

- Q = Qualifier
- WC = Wild card
- LL = Lucky loser
- Alt = Alternate
- ITF = ITF entry
- PR = Protected ranking
- SR = Special ranking
- SE = Special exempt
- JE = Junior exempt
- JR = Junior Accelerator Programme entrant
- CO = College Accelerator Programme entrant
- NG = Next Gen Accelerator Program entrant
- w/o = Walkover
- r = Retired
- d = Defaulted

=== Finals ===
Quarterfinals			Semifinals				Final
			1	(United States) Sherwood Stewart (United States) Ferdi Taygan	6	6
(United States) Victor Amaya (United States) Hank Pfister	7	7		(United States) Victor Amaya (United States) Hank Pfister	2	2
(United States) Tom Gullikson (United States) Tim Gullikson	6	6					1	(United States) Sherwood Stewart (United States) Ferdi Taygan	5	3
(Czechoslovakia) Pavel Složil (Czechoslovakia) Tomáš Šmíd	7	7					2	(United States) Peter Fleming (United States) John McEnroe	7	6
(South Africa) Kevin Curren (United States) Steve Denton	6	6		(Czechoslovakia) Pavel Složil (Czechoslovakia) Tomáš Šmíd	3	4
			2	(United States) Peter Fleming (United States) John McEnroe	6	6
