= 1998 ATP Tour World Championships =

- Date: 24–29 November (singles); 18–22 November (doubles)
- Edition: 29th (singles); 25th (doubles)
- Category: Tour Championships
- Prize money: $3,300,000
- Surface: Hard / indoor
- Location: Hanover, Germany (singles); Hartford, US (doubles)
- Venue: EXPO 2000 Tennis Dome (singles); Hartford Civic Center (doubles)

Champions

Singles
- (Spain) Àlex Corretja

Doubles
- (Netherlands) Jacco Eltingh / (Netherlands) Paul Haarhuis
- ATP Finals

The 1998 ATP Tour World Championships (also known for the doubles event as the Phoenix ATP Tour World Doubles Championship for sponsorship reasons) was a tennis tournament played on indoor carpet courts. The surface was called "GreenSet On Wood" which had a wood base coated in synthetic material and provided a medium-pace surface. It was the 29th edition of the year-end singles championships, the 25th edition of the year-end doubles championships, and both were part of the 1998 ATP Tour. The singles event took place at the EXPO 2000 Tennis Dome in Hanover, Germany, from 24 November through 29 November 1998, and the doubles event at the Hartford Civic Center in Hartford, Connecticut, United States, from 18 November through 22 November 1998.

== Finals ==
=== Singles ===
(Spain) Àlex Corretja defeated (Spain) Carlos Moyá, 3–6, 3–6, 7–5, 6–3, 7–5

- It was Àlex Corretja's 5th title of the year, and his 9th overall. It was his 1st career year-end championships title.

=== Doubles ===
(Netherlands) Jacco Eltingh / (Netherlands) Paul Haarhuis defeated (The Bahamas) Mark Knowles / (Canada) Daniel Nestor, 6–4, 6–2, 7–5
