= 2000 Tennis Masters Cup and ATP Tour World Championships =

- Date: 28 November – 3 December (singles); 13–17 December (doubles)
- Edition: 31st (singles) / 27th (doubles)
- Category: Tour Championships

Champions

Singles
- (Brazil) Gustavo Kuerten

Doubles
- (United States) Donald Johnson / (South Africa) Piet Norval
- ATP Finals ATP Tour World Championships

The 2000 Tennis Masters Cup and the ATP Tour World Championships (also known as the Gold Flake ATP Tour World Doubles Championship for sponsorship reasons) were tennis tournaments played on indoor hard courts for the singles event, and outdoor hard courts for the doubles event. It was the 31st edition of the year-end singles championships, the 27th edition of the year-end doubles championships, and both were part of the 2000 ATP Tour. The singles event took place at the Pavilhão Atlântico in Lisbon, Portugal, from 28 November through 3 December 2000, and the doubles event at the KSLTA Tennis Center in Bangalore, India, from 13 December through 17 December 2000.

== Finals ==
=== Singles ===
(Brazil) Gustavo Kuerten defeated (United States) Andre Agassi 6–4, 6–4, 6–4

- It was Kuerten's 5th title of the year, and his 10th overall. It was his only career year-end championships title.

=== Doubles ===
(United States) Donald Johnson / (South Africa) Piet Norval defeated (India) Mahesh Bhupathi / (India) Leander Paes 7–6^{(10–8)}, 6–3, 6–4
