= 1970 Pepsi-Cola Masters =

- Date: December 9–15
- Edition: 1st
- Category: Masters
- Draw: 6S / 3D
- Prize money: $50,000
- Surface: Carpet / indoor
- Location: Tokyo, Japan
- Venue: Tokyo Metropolitan Gymnasium

Champions

Singles
- (United States) Stan Smith

Doubles
- (United States) Arthur Ashe / (United States) Stan Smith
- ATP Finals

The 1970 Masters (also known as the 1970 Pepsi-Cola Masters for sponsorship reasons) was a tennis tournament played on indoor carpet courts at the Tokyo Metropolitan Gymnasium in Tokyo, Japan. It was the first edition of the year-end Masters Grand Prix and was held from December 9 through December 15, 1970. The event included a singles and doubles draw, both of which were held in a round robin format. Stan Smith won the first singles title and then partnered Arthur Ashe to the doubles title as well.

The best six players from the 1970 Grand Prix circuit ranking qualified for the singles event. Cliff Richey, the winner of the Grand Prix ranking, could not participate due to illness. John Newcombe was the first replacement as the number seven ranked but was unable to play which meant that Jan Kodeš, ranked eight, completed the field. Stan Smith won the singles title in the round robin format and earned $15,000 first-prize money.

== Finals ==
=== Singles ===
(United States) Stan Smith won a round robin competition also featuring (United States) Arthur Ashe, (Socialist Federal Republic of Yugoslavia) Željko Franulović, (Czechoslovakia) Jan Kodeš, (Australia) Rod Laver and (Australia) Ken Rosewall.

- It was Smith's 6th title of the year and the 9th of his career.

=== Doubles ===
(United States) Arthur Ashe / (United States) Stan Smith won a round robin competition against the teams of (Czechoslovakia) Jan Kodeš / (Australia) Rod Laver and (Socialist Federal Republic of Yugoslavia) Željko Franulović / (Australia) Ken Rosewall.

- It was Ashe's 6th title of the year and the 7th of his professional career. It was Smith's 7th title of the year and the 10th of his career.
