= 1985 Nabisco Masters =

- Date: January 14–21, 1986
- Edition: 16th (singles) / 12th (doubles)
- Category: Masters
- Draw: 16S / 8D
- Prize money: $500,000
- Surface: Carpet / indoor
- Location: New York City, US
- Venue: Madison Square Garden

Champions

Singles
- (Czechoslovakia) Ivan Lendl

Doubles
- (Sweden) Stefan Edberg / (Sweden) Anders Järryd
- ATP Finals

The 1985 Masters (also known as the 1985 Nabisco Masters for sponsorships) was a men's tennis tournament held in Madison Square Garden, New York City, New York, United States in January 1986. It was the 16th edition of the year-end championships and was part of the 1985 Nabisco Grand Prix. First-seeded Ivan Lendl won the singles title.

== Finals ==
=== Singles ===
(Czechoslovakia) Ivan Lendl defeated (West Germany) Boris Becker, 6–2, 7–6, 6–3

- It was Lendl's 11th singles title of the season and the 53rd of his career.

=== Doubles ===
(Sweden) Stefan Edberg / (Sweden) Anders Järryd defeated (Sweden) Joakim Nyström / (Sweden) Mats Wilander 6–1, 7–6
