= 1976 Commercial Union Assurance Masters – Doubles =

Doubles
- 1976 Commercial Union Assurance Masters

Final
- Champion: (United States) Fred McNair (United States) Sherwood Stewart
- Runner-up: (United States) Brian Gottfried (Mexico) Raúl Ramírez
- Score: 6–3, 5–7, 5–7, 6–4, 6–4

Details
- Draw: 4

Events
| Singles | Doubles |
- Commercial Union Assurance Masters

Fred McNair and Sherwood Stewart defeated Brian Gottfried and Raúl Ramírez in the final, 6–3, 5–7, 5–7, 6–4, 6–4 to win the doubles tennis title at the 1976 Masters Grand Prix.

Juan Gisbert Sr. and Manuel Orantes were the defending champions, but were defeated in the semifinals by McNair and Stewart.

== Knockout stage ==
Key

- Q = Qualifier
- WC = Wild card
- LL = Lucky loser
- Alt = Alternate
- ITF = ITF entry
- PR = Protected ranking
- SR = Special ranking
- SE = Special exempt
- JE = Junior exempt
- JR = Junior Accelerator Programme entrant
- CO = College Accelerator Programme entrant
- NG = Next Gen Accelerator Program entrant
- w/o = Walkover
- r = Retired
- d = Defaulted

=== Draw ===
Semifinals
(United States) Brian Gottfried (Mexico) Raúl Ramírez | 6 | 6 | 6
(Egypt) Ismail El Shafei (New Zealand) Brian Fairlie | 3 | 3 | 4
(United States) Fred McNair (United States) Sherwood Stewart | 6 | 6 | 6
(Spain) Juan Gisbert (Spain) Manuel Orantes | 3 | 4 | 4

Final
(United States) Brian Gottfried (Mexico) Raúl Ramírez | 3 | 7 | 7 | 4 | 4
(United States) Fred McNair (United States) Sherwood Stewart | 6 | 5 | 5 | 6 | 6
