= Design Museum Gent =

Museum in Ghent, Belgium

- Vereniging voor Nijverheids- en Decoratieve Kunsten
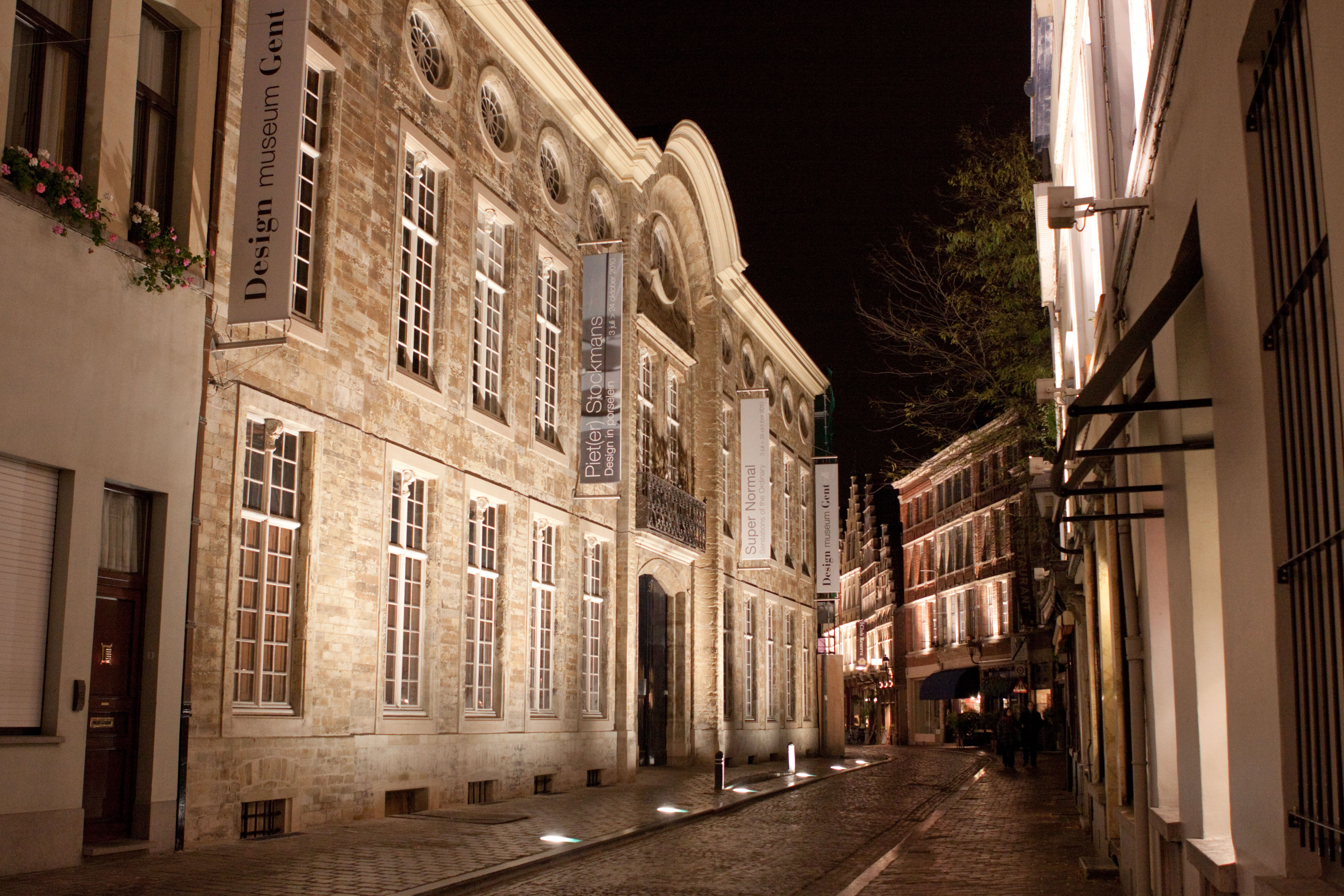

- Location within Belgium
- Established: 1903
- Location: Ghent, Belgium
- Coordinates: 51.055833°N 3.720139°E
- Director: Katrien Laporte
- Public transit access: Korenmarkt; Gravensteen
- Website: designmuseumgent.be/en

Design Museum Gent is a museum in Belgium with an international design collection. The museum complex is located in the tourist centre of Ghent and comprises an 18th-century mansion and a modern wing. The museum holds a collection of Belgian design, supported by international objects.

== History ==
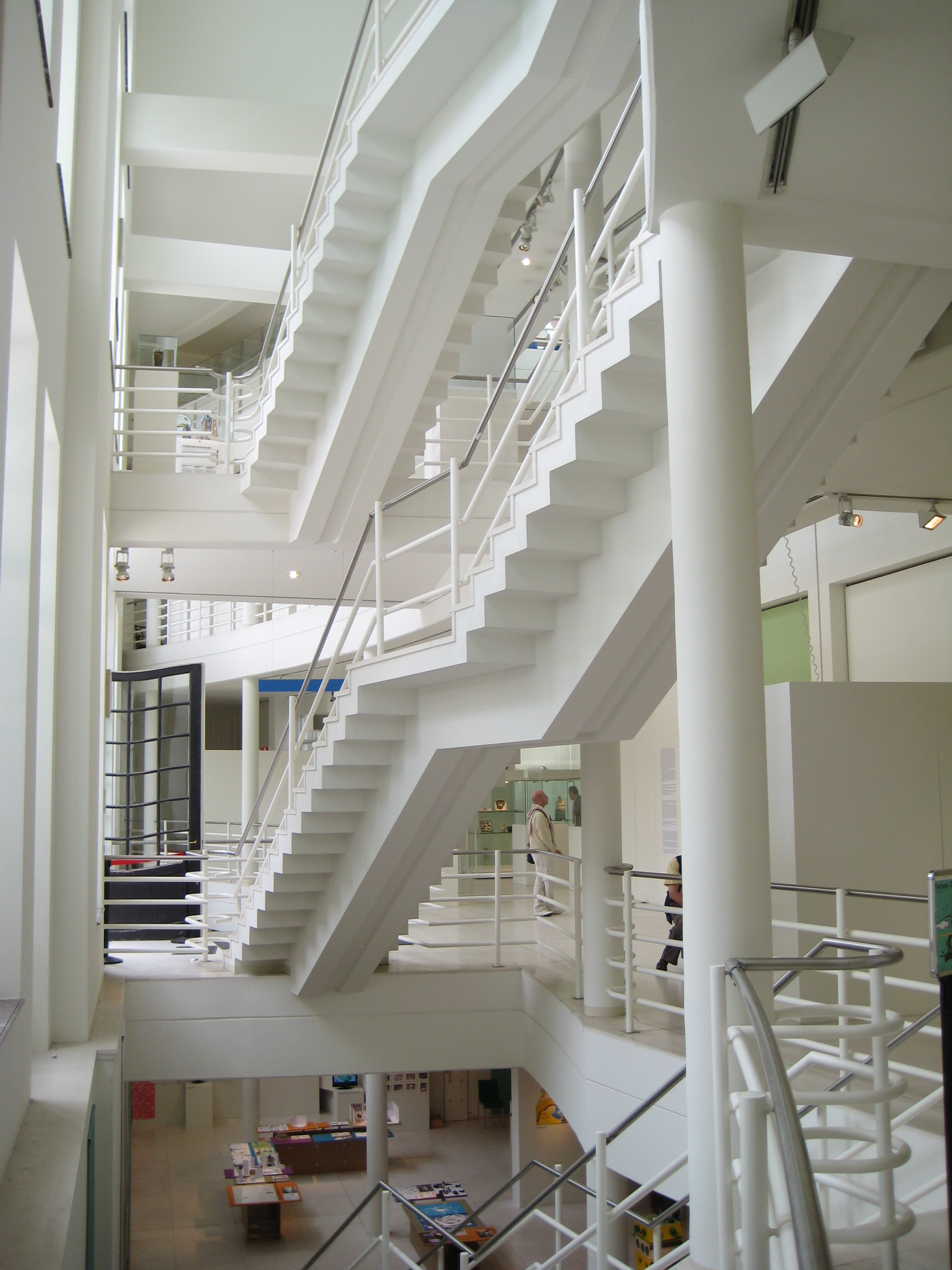
Stairs in the 1992 building of Design Museum Gent

Design Museum Gent originates from a private initiative of a group of industrial design and art lovers who united in 1903 as the Union des Arts Industriels et Décoratifs (Association of Industrial and Decorative Arts) and created a French: Musée des Modèles. Initially, the collection consisted of some hundred examples of furniture, complemented by subcollections of ceramics, copper and bronze, furniture fragments and a large textile collection. These models were housed in the Ghent municipal academy, situated in the Sint-Margrietstraat.

As the collection grew with purchases in the various pavilions during the Ghent 1913 World Exhibition and further extension of the collection, the union sought larger quarters. In 1922 the museum moved to Hotel de Coninck on the Jan Breydelstraat, which the city of Ghent had bought a couple of years earlier. In 1951, under the leadership of a new director, Adelbert Van de Walle, three shows called the National Salons for Modern Social Furniture were organised. These took place in 1955, 1956, and 1957. They invited local manufacturers to exhibit their furniture showcased in rooms as staged domestic environments and to take orders placed by visitors, thus facilitating the distribution of modern, affordable design.

By 1958, the financial burden had become too much for the Association of Industrial and Decorative Arts, and the city of Ghent took over the administration and management of the museum. Between 1958 and 1973, the museum was closed for renovations. Its reopening was followed by an expansion plan, resulting in the inauguration of a new wing in 1992, which accommodates both a selection from the modern and contemporary design collection and temporary exhibitions. The extension was designed by architect Willy Verstraete and was opened in May 1992. In the modern part of the building, a hydraulic lift in the central section can be used to adapt the height of the floors. The current policy of the museum puts greater focus on Belgian design from 1970.

== Expansion and renovations ==
The museum reopened on 3 October 2026 following renovation and the construction of a five-storey wing designed by Carmody Groarke, ATAMA (formerly TRANS), and RE-ST. The extension completes the fourth side of the museum's courtyard and connects its existing buildings. Its timber structure is insulated with hemp and clad in 82,000 lime-cured bricks made using local construction waste.

== Collection ==
The museum collection has evolved from 17th and 18th century applied arts towards modern and contemporary design from 1860 to the present. The objects from before 1860 provide the historic basis for the modern and contemporary design. Design Museum Gent applies a broad definition of design, based on a series of criteria that can be found in a product: contemporaneity, innovation, ergonomics, durability and aesthetic relevance. Both serial products and unique objects can comply with these requirements. Innovation can relate to form, function, material and production techniques. Purchases and exhibitions are focused on 20th century and contemporary creations.

=== Growth of the collection ===
The collection of Design Museum Gent took shape in three phases:

- In a first phase, between 1903 and 1930, the museum accumulated a collection and a corresponding library aimed at a 'musée des modèles', focusing on furniture dating back to 1600–1800 and some particular subcollections such as Art Nouveau, Asian objects, textile and French Art Deco.
- Between 1930 and 1974, the museum collection remained mostly static, not least owing to its closure between 1958 and 1973.
- The phase between 1974 and 2013 was characterised by an expansion of the international design collection with major purchases and donations. From 1977 onwards, curator and later museum director Lieven Daenens acquired Belgian Art Nouveau ensembles designed by Henry van de Velde, Victor Horta and Paul Hankar. In 1987, interior and furniture designer Pieter De Bruyne bequeathed his archives as a designer and lecturer, along with a library and various furniture. In the same year, the collector N.F. Havermans left his collection of Art Nouveau and Art Deco glassware, ceramics and silver. Between 1980 and 2000, the collection added national and international designers. The Italian radical design by the designer collectives Alchimia and the Memphis Group (including Mendini, Branzi and Sottsass) extended the museum collection. The appointment of Katrien Laporte (2013 to present) as museum director brought a focus on 1970 onwards in Belgian design.

=== Profile of the collection ===
The collection now holds nearly 22,000 objects. It mainly includes Western European design, with a distinct presence of Belgium, the Netherlands, France, Scandinavia and Italy. The collection focuses especially on interior-oriented design from private residences and offices. It includes applied arts and design dating from 1450 to present and is regionally, nationally and internationally diversified. It features comprehensive coverage of trend-setting design starting from Art Nouveau and hosts several notable unique objects of national and international design. The historic subcollection (1450–1900) covers a broad range of 18th century furniture. The proto-design objects from 1860 onwards form an entree to the modern design collection, which is initiated by the Art Nouveau collection and continues till today.

==== Proto-design ====
The museum possesses a small collection of objects designed by Christopher Dresser. The furniture of the Vienna furniture companies Thonet and Kohn are at the dawn of modern design as well.

==== Art Nouveau ====
Design Museum Gent is known for its collection of Belgian Art Nouveau made by Paul Hankar, Gustave Serrurier-Bovy, Victor Horta, Henry van de Velde, Philippe Wolfers and Alfred William Finch. These Belgian designers are accompanied by foreign top designers such as Louis Majorelle, Emile Gallé, René Lalique, Daum, Richard Riemerschmid, Josef Hoffmann, Otto Wagner and Georg Jensen.

==== Art Deco ====
The collection features French glassware by Daum, Lalique, Marcel Goupy, Maurice Marinot, Jean Sala, Charles Schneider, Gabriel Argy-Rousseau, and copper vases by Jean Dunand and Claude Linossier. The museum also possesses ceramic vases of Llorens Artigas, Fernand Rumèbe and services by Jean Luc and Georg Jensen. An idiosyncratic furniture collection was assembled by the Ghent architect Albert Van Huffel, designer of the Koekelberg Basilica. The museum also holds his archives. Another notable item is the ‘Gioconda’ service designed by Philippe Wolfers in 1925 for the exhibition ‘Exposition des Arts Décoratifs et lndustriels’ in Paris. Services from the companies Wolfers and Delheid represent Belgian Art Deco silverware.

==== Modernism ====
The modernism of Le Corbusier, Alvar Aalto, Marcel Breuer, Mies van der Rhoe and Lilly Reich (Knoll collection), Christa Ehrlich, Poul Henningsen and Wilhelm Wagenfeld contrasts with the sumptuous Art Deco. The Flemish architect-designers Gaston Eysselinck and Huib Hoste are featured.

==== Organic design ====
The collection also includes a selection of modern design dating from the period 1945–1965 with furniture of Belgian designers such as Willy Van der Meeren, Alfred Hendrickx, Emiel Veranneman, Pieter De Bruyne, Jules Wabbes, Léon Stynen, and Christophe Gevers; American designers Florence Knoll, Charles and Ray Eames; Scandinavian designers Arne Jacobsen, Hans Wegner, Verner Panton, Yrjö Kukkapuro, Tapio Wirkkala, and Kristian Vedel; and Italian designers Joe Colombo, Carlo Scarpa (Cleto Munari). The Netherlands and Scandinavia are represented by glassware of the companies Royal Leerdam Crystal (Andries Dirk Copier), Orrefors (Sven Palmqvist), Venini and Iittala, and silverware from Henning Koppel (Georg Jensen) and Lino Sabattini (Christofle). The Belgian headquarters of Tupperware Europe, with chief designers Bob Daenen and Vic Cautereels, contributes familiar kitchen objects.

==== Anti-Design ====
The museum possesses an ensemble of the Italian Anti-Design collectives Studio Alchimia and the Memphis Group, represented by Ettore Sottsass, Alessandro Mendini, Michele de Lucchi, Matteo Thun, Marco Zanini and Nathalie Du Pasquier.

==== Postmodernism ====
An early postmodern piece of furniture, the 1975 Chantilly cupboard designed by Pieter De Bruyne, leads off the Belgian design collection. Foreign designers such as Michael Graves, Bořek Šípek, Richard Meier, Hans Hollein and Aldo Rossi are also featured.

==== International design ====
International designers include Ron Arad, Toyo Ito, Hella Jongerius, Peter Opsvik, Barbara Nanning, Marc Newson, Philippe Starck, Michael Young, Marcel Wanders, and František Vízner.

==== Modern and contemporary Belgian design ====
Design Museum Gent features more recent and contemporary Belgian designers such as Maarten Van Severen, Hans De Pelsmacker, Lachaert & d'Hanis, Marc Supply, Xavier Lust, Pol Quadens, Quinze & Milan, Fabiaan Van Severen, Weyers & Borms and Dirk Wynants. Ceramics in the contemporary collection are by Piet Stockmans, Tjok Dessauvage, Arthur Vermeiren, Rik Vandewege and Ann Van Hoey. Glassware comes from the ovens of the Antwerp collective L'Anverre and Carine Neutjens. Silverware is designed by Jean Lemmens and Siegfried De Buck, Nedda El-Asmar and David Huycke. Samsonite (designer Erik Sijmons), Hedgren and Kipling (designer Xavier Kegels) luggage is also included in the collection. Recent acquisitions of the younger Belgian generation, represented by Muller Van Severen, Maarten De Ceulaer and Ben Storms, look to the future.

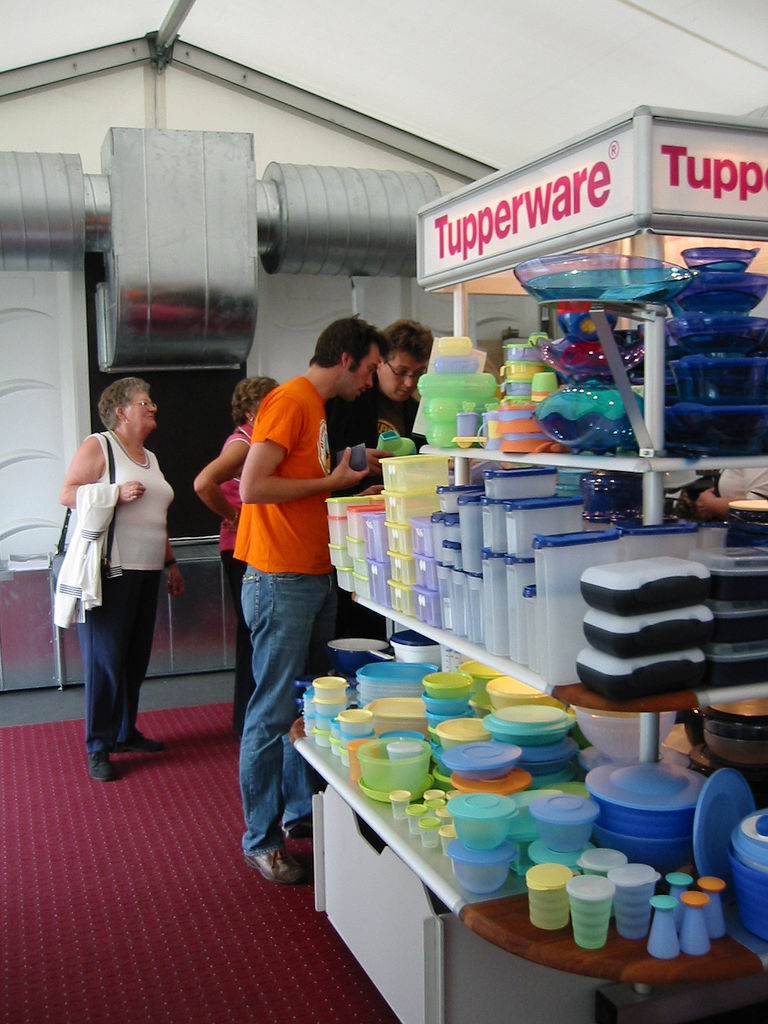
Tupperware exhibition

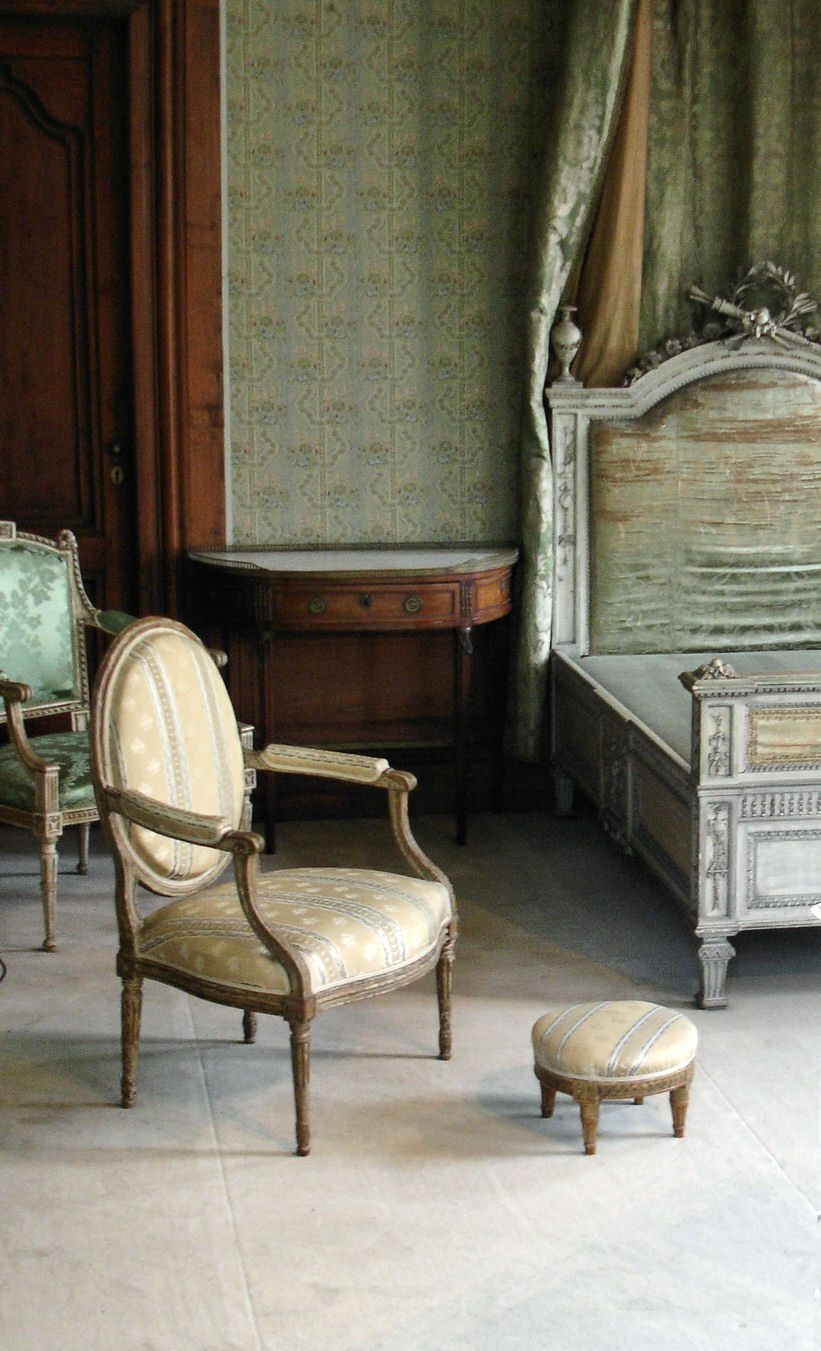
Room in Hotel de Coninck

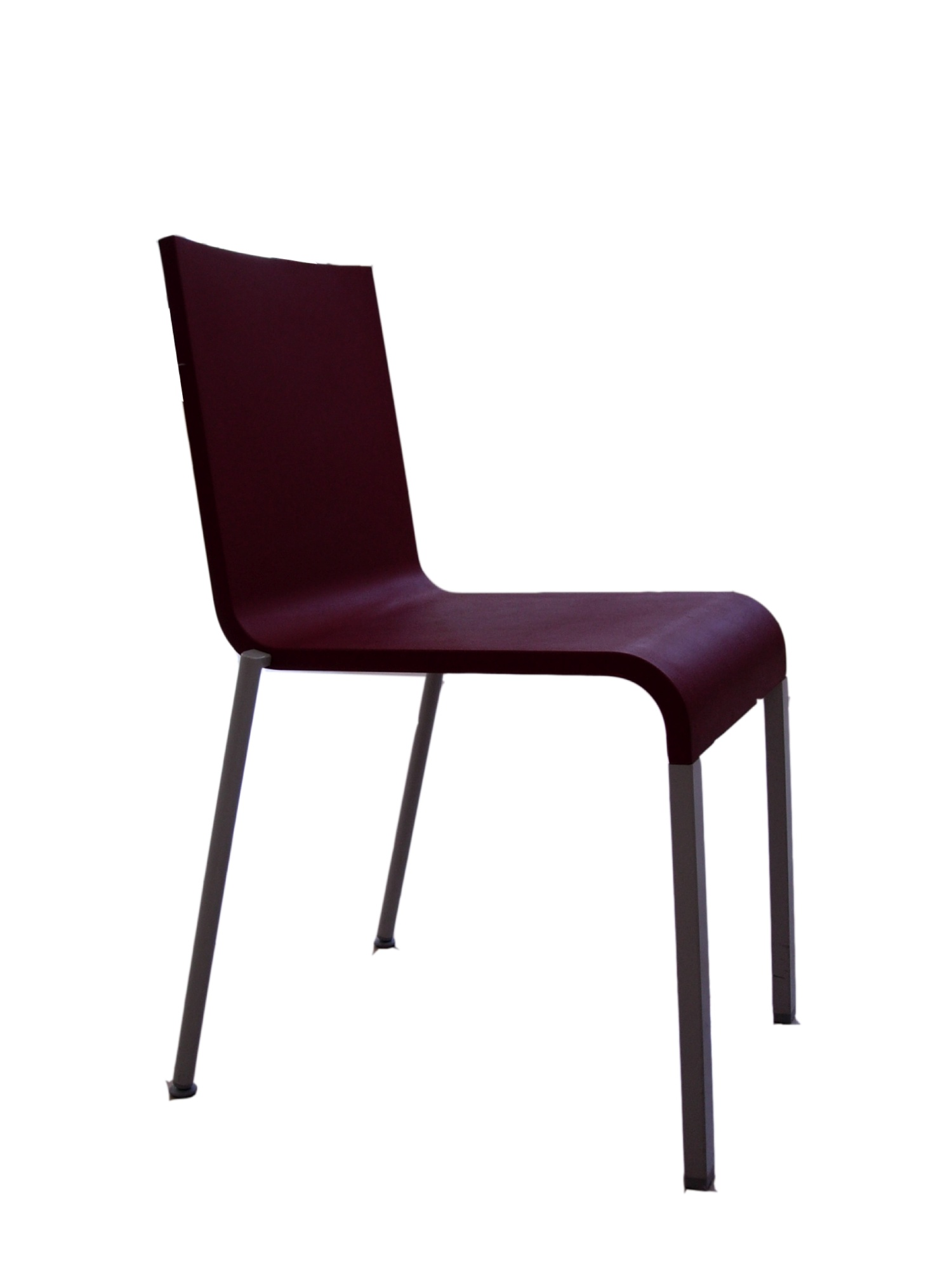
.03 by Maarten Van Severen

==== Alonso international glass collection ====
The collection of Spanish diplomat Antonio Alonso Madero comprising about 300 works in glass is held at the museum. The collection includes pieces by Tapio Wirkkala, Strömbergshyttan, Léon Ledru, Auguste Jean, Emile Gallé, Josef Hoffmann, and other notable glass artists.

== See also ==
- List of design museums
