= Boom! Boom! The World vs. Boris Becker =

Film by Alex Gibney

- Release poster
- Directed by: Alex Gibney
- Screenplay by: Alex Gibney
- Produced by: John Battsek; Alex Gibney; Erin Edeiken; George Chignell
- Starring: Barbara Becker; Boris Becker; Björn Borg; Novak Djokovic; John McEnroe; Ion Tiriac; Mats Wilander
- Edited by: Michael J. Palmer; Graeme Butler (co-editor)
- Music by: Peter Nashell; Eric V. Hachikian
- Production companies: Jigsaw Productions; Ventureland
- Distributed by: Apple TV+
- Release dates: 19 February 2023 (part one - Berlin); 7 April 2023
- Running time: 96 minutes (part one); 113 minutes (part two)
- Country: United Kingdom
- Language: English

Boom! Boom! The World vs. Boris Becker is a 2023 documentary film by Alex Gibney. It details the life of troubled tennis champion Boris Becker including exclusive access to three years of his life up to his incarceration in the United Kingdom in April 2022. It is a co-production between Ventureland and Jigsaw Productions, with financing from Lorton Entertainment. The first part premiered at the 2023 Berlin Film Festival on 19 February 2023. The film was released in two parts on Apple TV+ from April 7, 2023.

== Synopsis ==
Narrated by Gibney, the first part of the documentary details the precocious rise of Becker the tennis player from teenage Wimbledon champion to becoming world number one. It concludes with the warning that the traits that drove Becker to tennis greatness would in turn also lead to his downfall, to be investigated in part two.

== Cast ==
- Boris Becker
- Barbara Becker
- Ion Tiriac
- Björn Borg
- Novak Djokovic
- John McEnroe
- Lilian de Carvalho
- Mats Wilander
- Michael Stich
- Brad Gilbert
- Nick Bollettieri

== Production ==
The project is a co-production between Ventureland and Jigsaw Productions, with financing from Lorton Entertainment and boasts exclusive access to Boris Becker over a three-year build-up to his prison sentencing in the UK courts for hiding assets and loans to avoid paying debt, in April 2022. The title is a nod to his "Boom Boom" nickname as a big-serving tennis player. Interviews in the documentary include Novak Djokovic, Ion Tiriac, John McEnroe and Bjorn Borg. Other talking heads include Michael Stich, Brad Gilbert and Nick Bollettieri.

== Release ==
The first part premiered at the Berlin Film Festival on 19 February 2023. Both parts will be available to stream on Apple TV+ on 7 April 2023.

== Reception ==
On review aggregator Rotten Tomatoes, the film holds a score of 94% based on 18 reviews, with an average rating of 6.5/10. The website's critics consensus reads, "Approachable even for viewers who don't know a lob from a moonball, Boom! Boom! chronicles a spectacular rise and fall with absorbing insight." On Metacritic, the film has a weighted average score of 63 out of 100 based on six critics, indicating "mixed or average" reviews.

Kevin Maher in The Times gave the film a positive review saying it was "fabulously paced, nicely shot, and with snappy, illuminating contributions from Borg, McEnroe and an unexpectedly wry Mats Wilander. Gibney also re-examines crucial career matches with revealing hindsight".
