= Romanian International Championships =

Defunct tennis tournament
- Tour: ILTF World Open Circuit (1922-1972); ILTF/ITF Independent Circuit (1973-1981)
- Founded: 1922; 104 years ago
- Abolished: 1981; 45 years ago
- Location: Bucharest; Mamaia
- Venue: Various

Current champions
- Men's singles: (Romania) Andrei Dîrzu

The Romanian International Championships was a tennis tournament also known as the Rumanian International Championships it was held in Romania from 1922 until 1981.

Past champions included József Asbóth, Władysław Skonecki, Günther Bosch, Ilie Nastase and Ion Țiriac.

The event was held in mainly in Bucharest, but also occasionally in Mamaia. It was held typically in late summer in early autumn, often in early September. When the Grand Prix circuit began in 1970, the event was not part of it and it dwindled. Eventually it wasn't held anymore. A decade after the event ended, the Romanian Open began. This is an ATP event.

== Past finals ==
=== Men's singles ===
Year	Champion	Runner-up	Score
1930	(Socialist Federal Republic of Yugoslavia) Franjo Šefer	(Romania) Ghica Poulieff	2-6, 4-6, 7-5, 6-3, 6-0
1931	(Czechoslovakia) Josef Maleček	(Hungary) Béla von Kehrling	0-6, 8-6, 3-6, 6-2 rtd.
1932	(West Germany) Louis Haensch	(Romania) Ghica Poulieff	6-2, 6-2, 9-7
1934	(Czechoslovakia) Jósef Caska	(Romania) Ghica Poulieff	8-6, 6-3, 6-0
1935	(Czechoslovakia) Svatopluk Černoch	(Poland) Kazimierz Tarlowski	1-6, 2-6, 6-4, 6-3, 6-0
1936	(Czechoslovakia) František Cejnar	(Romania) Cristea Caralulis	6-4, 6-4, 7-5
1940-45	No competition		
1949	(Hungary) József Asbóth	(Romania) Gheorghe Viziru	8-6, 6-2, 6-2
1950	(Poland) Władysław Skonecki	(Romania) Gheorghe Viziru	1-6, 6-4, 7-5, 6-2
1956	(Czechoslovakia) Jan Krajcik	(Hungary) Zoltán Katona	6-4, 3-6, 6-2, 6-3
1957	(Romania) Gheorghe Viziru	(Soviet Union) Sergei Andreev	6-2, 5-7, 0-6, 7-5, 6-4
1958	(France) Jean-Claude Molinari	(Soviet Union) Sergei Andreev	2-6, 7-5, 6-1, 6-2
1961	(Romania) Günther Bosch	(Romania) Gheorghe Viziru	
1966	(Romania) Ilie Năstase	(Romania) Ion Țiriac	8-6, 6-4, 6-4
1967	(Romania) Ion Țiriac	(Netherlands) Tom Okker	6-1, 7-5, 3-6, 4-6, 6-3
1968	(Romania) Ilie Năstase	(Australia) John Alexander	6-4, 11-9, 6-2
1970	(Romania) Sever Dron	(Czechoslovakia) František Pála	6-2, 6-1, 7-5
1976	(Czechoslovakia) Tomáš Šmíd	(Romania) Dumitru Hărădău	6-4, 6-1, 6-0
1978	(West Germany) Thomas Emmrich	(Romania) Dumitru Hărădău	6-4, 6-7, 6-2
1981	(Romania) Andrei Dîrzu	(Romania) Octavian Vilcioiu	6-3, 6-2

== See also ==
- Category:National and multi-national tennis tournaments
