= Quinze & Milan =

Belgian designer furniture label

Quinze & Milan Designers
- Type: Private
- Founded: 1999
- Founder: Arne Quinze, Yves Milan
- Headquarters: Kortrijk, Belgium
- Area served: Worldwide
- Products: Designer furniture
- Owner: Arne Quinze
- Number of employees: >60
- Website: quinzeandmilan.tv

Quinze & Milan Designers is a Belgian cult design label of designer furniture founded by Belgian conceptual artist Arne Quinze and Yves Milan, who has since left the company, in 1999.

== Products ==
The company's basic product range consists of pieces for use in public areas, homes and offices.

In 1999, Primary Pouf 01, a block of brightly colored polyurethane foam on legs, kicked off the use of coated foam. The label nowadays features as well various collections in wood, fabrics, steel, PE and concrete.

Since 2020, SDC Lab is the exclusive licensee of the Quinze & Milan brand and collection.
