= Pieter Stockmans =

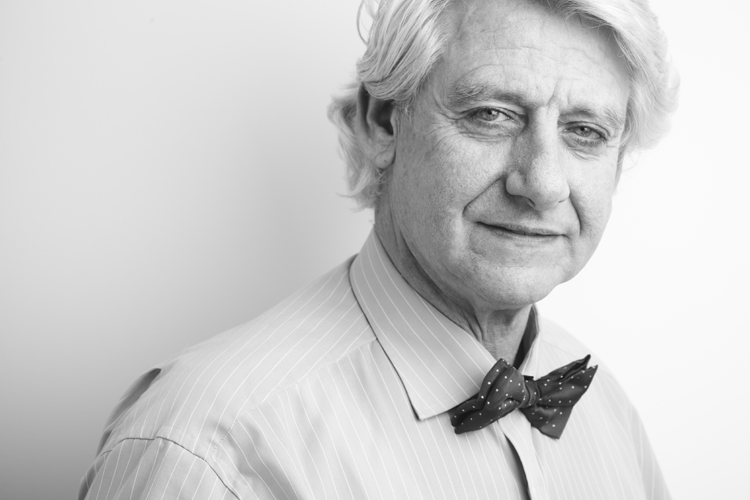
Portrait of Piet Stockmans, 2012.

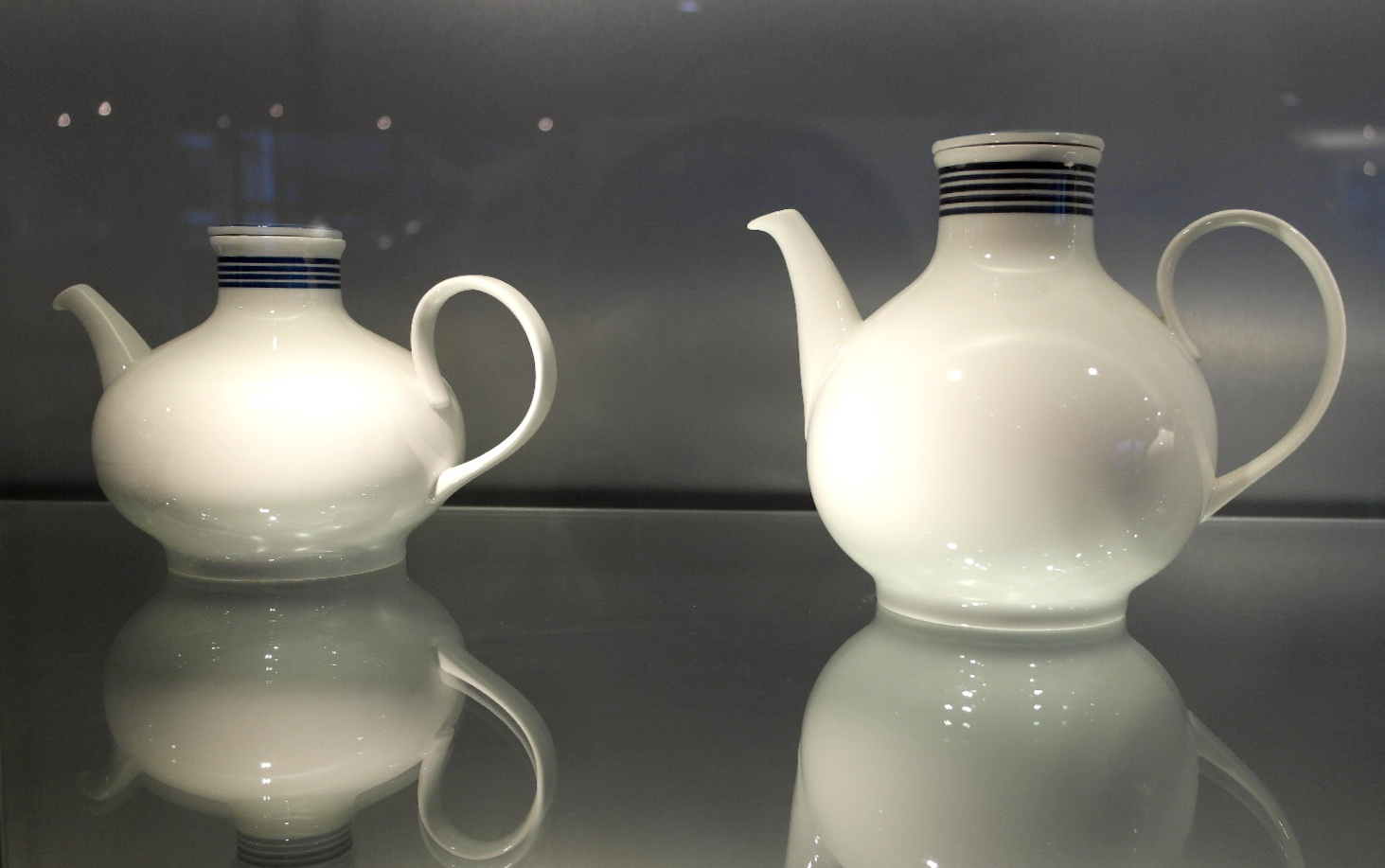
Servies Fuga, 1963.

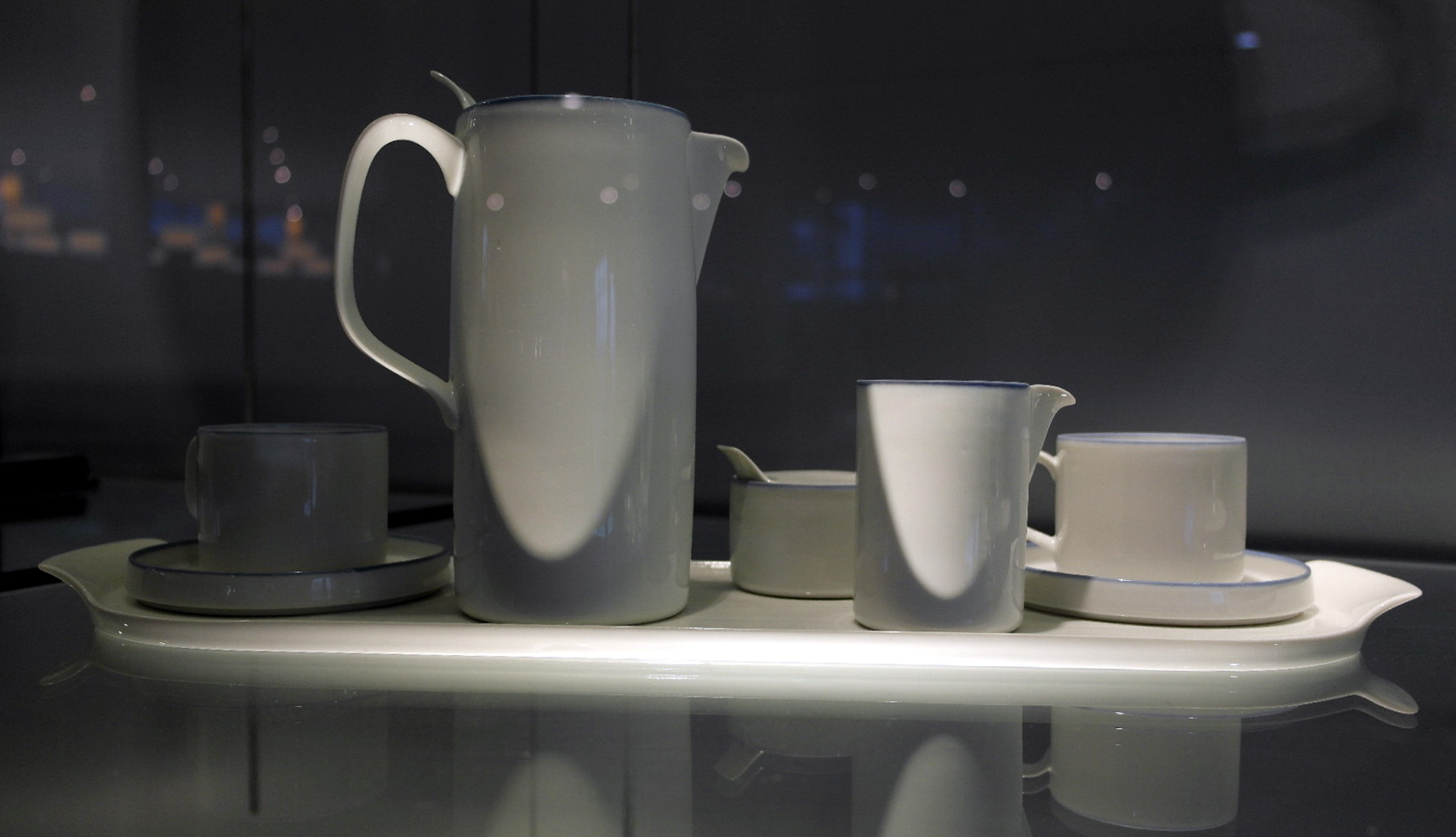
Servies Tête-à-tête, ca. 1983.

Pieter "Piet" Stockmans (born 26 October 1940) is a Flemish designer and ceramist.

== Biography ==
Stockmans was born in Leopoldsburg. He studied sculpture and ceramics in Hasselt and in Selb in Germany. After graduation, he settled in Genk.

From 1966 to 1989 Stockmans was an industrial designer in the Royal Mosa porcelain factory in Maastricht. In those years he was the chief designer, who designed over 70% of all the company's products. Most successful was his design for the coffee "Sonja" cup, of which over 40 million were sold.

Between 1969 and 1998 Stockman also taught industrial design at the Department of Product Design at the Municipal Institute of Visual Comm and Design, later Media and Design Academy in Genk, and from 1983 to 1985 taught ceramic design at the Design Academy Eindhoven. Since 1989, he has been a freelance designer.

Since 2010, Stockmans has lived on the C-Mine site, a former coal-mine complex near to Winterslag in Genk. In autumn 2010, there was a retrospective of his work at the Design Museum in Ghent.

== Selected publications ==
- Jo Rombouts, Piet Stockmans. Piet(er) Stockmans, Studio Pieter Stockmans, 2011.

== See also ==
- List of Dutch ceramists
