= Boris Becker =

German tennis player, coach, and commentator (born 1967)

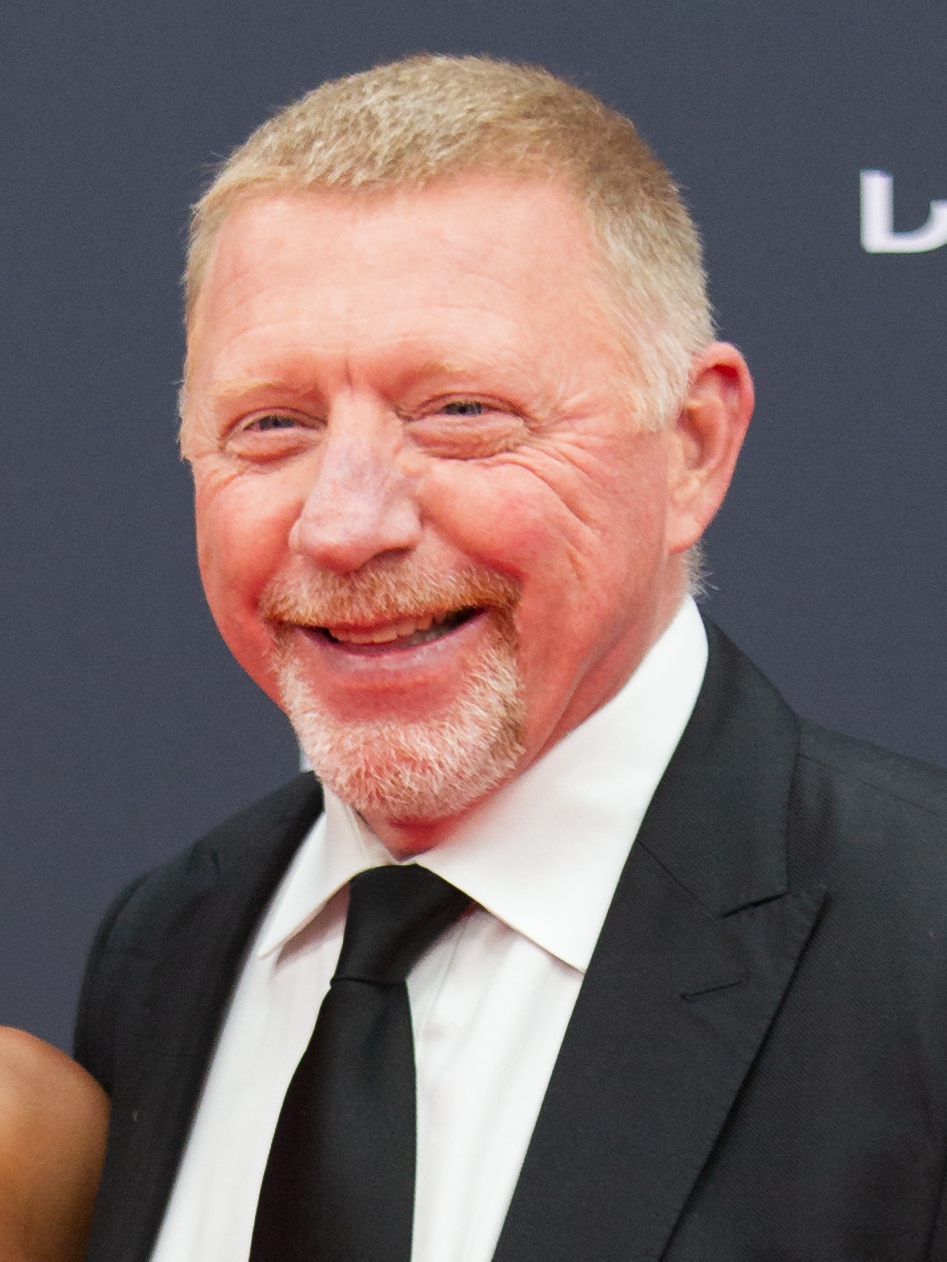
- Becker in 2024
- Full name: Boris Franz Becker
- Country (sports): West Germany (1984–1990); Germany (1990–1999)
- Born: 22 November 1967 (age 58) Leimen, West Germany
- Height: 1.91 m (6 ft 3 in)
- Turned pro: 1984 (amateur 1983)
- Retired: 1999
- Plays: Right-handed (one-handed backhand)
- Coach: Günther Bosch (1976–87); Ion Țiriac (1984–93); Bob Brett (1987–91); Tomáš Šmíd (1991–92); Eric Jelen (1992, 1993); Günter Bresnik (1992–93); Nick Bollettieri (1993–95); Mike De Palmer (1995–99)
- Prize money: US$25,080,956: 23rd all-time leader in earnings
- Int. Tennis HoF: 2003 (member page)

Singles
- Career record: 713–214 (76.9%)
- Career titles: 49
- Highest ranking: No. 1 (28 January 1991)

Grand Slam singles results
- Australian Open: W (1991, 1996)
- French Open: SF (1987, 1989, 1991)
- Wimbledon: W (1985, 1986, 1989)
- US Open: W (1989)

Other tournaments
- Tour Finals: W (1988, 1992, 1995)
- Grand Slam Cup: W (1996)
- WCT Finals: W (1988)
- Olympic Games: 3R (1992)

Doubles
- Career record: 254–136 (65.1%)
- Career titles: 15
- Highest ranking: No. 6 (22 September 1986)

Grand Slam doubles results
- Australian Open: QF (1985)

Other doubles tournaments
- Olympic Games: W (1992)

Team competitions
- Davis Cup: W (1988, 1989)
- Hopman Cup: W (1995)

Coaching career (2013–2016, 2023-2024)
- Novak Djokovic (2013–2016); Holger Rune (2023–2024)

Coaching achievements
- Coachee singles titles total: 25
- List of notable tournaments (with champion): Career Grand Slam (Djokovic); 2× Australian Open (Djokovic); French Open (Djokovic); 2× Wimbledon (Djokovic); US Open (Djokovic); 2× ATP World Tour Finals (Djokovic); 14× ATP World Tour Masters 1000 (Djokovic)
Medal record
Men's tennis
Representing Germany
Olympic Games
Gold medal – first place	1992 Barcelona	Men's doubles

Boris Franz Becker (German: [ˈboːʁɪs ˈbɛkɐ]; born 22 November 1967) is a German former professional tennis player, tennis coach and a commentator. He was ranked as the world No. 1 in men's singles by the Association of Tennis Professionals (ATP). Becker is considered to be one of the greatest players of all time, winning 49 career singles and 15 doubles titles, including six singles majors: three Wimbledon Championships, two Australian Opens and one US Open. He also won 13 Masters titles, five year-end championships, an Olympic gold medal in men's doubles in 1992, and led Germany to two Davis Cup titles in 1988 and 1989. Becker is the youngest-ever winner of the men's singles Wimbledon title, a feat he accomplished aged 17 years, 7 months and 15 days in 1985.

Becker is often credited as the pioneer of power tennis with his fast serve and all-court game. He is among the top ten players with the best win percentages in the Open Era. In 1989, he was voted the Player of the Year by both the ATP and the ITF. He holds a win percentage of 92.70% in Davis Cup singles rubbers, a win loss record of 38–3 and two championships for Germany. In his autobiography, Andre Agassi described Becker as the world's most popular tennis star in the late 1980s. Becker was featured at number 18 in the list of Tennis magazine's 40 greatest players of all time in 2006.

After his playing career ended, Becker became a tennis commentator and media personality, and his personal relationships were discussed in news outlets. He has engaged in numerous ventures, including coaching Novak Djokovic for three years, playing poker professionally, and working for an online poker company. In October 2002, the Munich District Court gave Becker a suspended two-year prison sentence for tax evasion. He declared bankruptcy in the UK in 2017. In April 2022, he was sentenced by UK courts to two and a half years in prison for hiding assets and loans that the court required him to disclose to creditors and the bankruptcy trustee. On 15 December 2022, he was released from prison early, having served eight months, and was deported to Germany by UK authorities.

== Early life ==
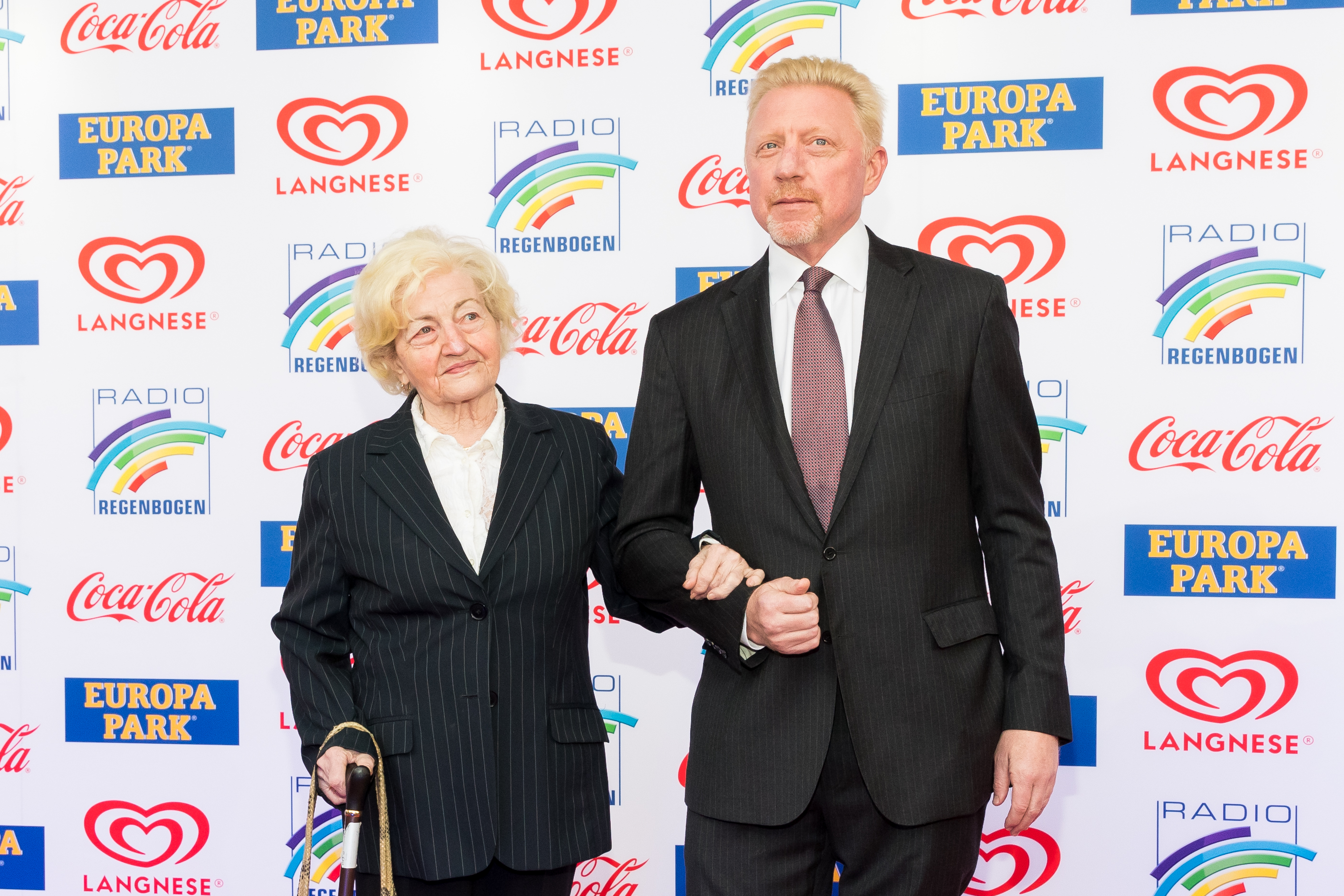
Becker with his mother Elvira at the Radio Regenbogen Awards, 2019

Boris Becker was born in 1967 in Leimen, a town in the German state of Baden-Württemberg, the son of Elvira and Karl-Heinz Becker. Named after the Russian poet and novelist Boris Pasternak, young Becker was raised Catholic. His father Karl-Heinz, an architect, founded a tennis centre in Leimen, where Becker learned to play tennis. He received his secondary education at Helmholtz-Gymnasium in Heidelberg. His Sudeten German mother Elvira Becker, née Pisch was from the Moravian village of Kunewald (Kunín).

== Tennis career ==
=== Junior career ===
In 1974, Becker joined TC Blau-Weiß Leimen tennis club and began training under Boris Breskvar. By 1977, he was a member of the junior team of the Baden Tennis Association. He went on to win the South German championship and the first German Youth Tennis Tournament. In 1977, he was chosen for the German Tennis Federation's top junior team by Richard Schönborn. According to Schönborn, the funding for Becker's training was put up by the German Tennis Federation at an expense of over 1.3 million DM. In 1981, he was included in the Federation's first men's team. In 1982, he won the doubles at the Orange Bowl International Tennis Championships.

=== 1984–1987: Teenage Grand Slam champion ===
Becker turned professional in 1984, under the guidance of Romanian-born coach Günther Bosch and Romanian manager Ion Ţiriac, and won his first professional doubles title that year in Munich. As a teenager, Becker won the Tennis World Young Masters at the NEC in Birmingham in 1985, before taking his first top-level singles title in June that year at Queen's Club. Two weeks later, on 7 July, he became the first unseeded player and the first German to win the Wimbledon singles title, defeating Kevin Curren in four sets. In the third round against Joakim Nystrom, Nystrom had twice served for the match before Becker won. Becker was at that time ranked 20th in ATP ranking, and was unseeded, as at that time Wimbledon did not seed players beyond the top 16. He was the youngest ever male Grand Slam singles champion at 17 years, 227 days (a record later broken by Michael Chang in 1989, who won the French Open when he was 17 years, 110 days). Two months after his triumph, Becker became the youngest winner of the Cincinnati Open. Becker has since said that "the plan from my parents for me was to finish school, go to university, get a proper degree and learn something respectful. The last thing on everyone's mind was me becoming a tennis professional."

In 1986, Becker successfully defended his Wimbledon title, defeating No. 1 Ivan Lendl in straight sets in the final with "a typically awesome array of sledgehammer serves and blockbuster groundstrokes". In the US Open semi finals, Miloslav Mečíř "handled the West German's booming serve with ease, used his groundstrokes to move Becker from side to side, and hit his serves so deep that Becker had trouble handling them" and Mecir won in five sets. In 1987, Becker reached his first French Open semi-final, where he lost to Mats Wilander in straight sets. At Wimbledon Becker, then ranked 2, lost in the second round to Peter Doohan, ranked 70. In the Davis Cup that year, Becker and John McEnroe played one of the longest matches in tennis history. Becker won in five sets lasting 6 hours and 22 minutes.

=== 1988–1992: Continuing success and No. 1 ===
Becker contested the Wimbledon final in 1988, where he lost in four sets to Stefan Edberg in a match that marked the start of one of Wimbledon's great rivalries. Becker also helped West Germany win its first Davis Cup in 1988 and did not lose a Davis Cup singles match during the year. He won the year-end Masters title in New York City, defeating five-time champion Lendl in the final. The same year he also won season ending WCT Finals for the rival World Championship Tennis tour, defeating Edberg in four sets.

In 1989, Becker lost to Edberg in the French Open semifinals. He defeated Edberg in the Wimbledon final, "volleying flawlessly and returning serve so well the Swede never had opportunities to take control with his vaunted net play, made few mistakes and won almost every crucial point". Becker then beat Lendl in the US Open final to win two Grand Slam singles titles in a year for the only time in his career. Lendl admitted afterwards "I had good stamina but was missing a little bit of my explosive energy". He also helped West Germany retain the Davis Cup, defeating Andre Agassi in the semifinal round after dropping the first two sets, in an epic spread over two days. Sports Illustrated ranked it as among the best matches ever played, alongside the 1972 WCT Finals final between Rod Laver and Ken Rosewall, and the 1980 Wimbledon final between Björn Borg and John McEnroe. Becker remained undefeated in Davis Cup singles for the second straight year. Becker was named Player of The Year by the ATP Tour.

In 1990, Becker met Edberg for the third consecutive year in the Wimbledon final, but this time lost in a five-set match. He failed to successfully defend his US Open title, losing to Agassi in the semifinals. Becker reached the final of the Australian Open for the first time in his career in 1991, where he defeated Lendl to claim the No. 1 ranking. Becker won the match with "his more dynamic play at the net, frolicking on the hard court as if it were Wimbledon's grass". Another loss to Agassi in the French Open semifinals kept him from winning the first two Grand Slam tournaments of the year. He was ranked No. 1 for 12 weeks during 1991 and reached his fourth consecutive Wimbledon final. However, he lost in straight sets to fellow German and No. 7 Michael Stich. In 1992, Becker and Stich teamed up in 1992 to win the men's doubles gold medal at the Olympic Games in Barcelona. Becker won seven tour titles including his second ATP Tour World Championships defeating Jim Courier in four sets.

=== 1993–1994: Mid-career decline ===
By 1993, issues back home over Becker's courtship of and marriage to Barbara Feltus, whose mother was German and father was African-American, and tax problems with the German government, had caused Becker to slide into a mid-career decline. He reached the Wimbledon semi finals in 1993, where he served 12 double faults and lost his serve twice in losing in straight sets to Sampras (who didn't lose a service game). Becker also reached the Wimbledon semi finals in 1994, where two of his beaten opponents, Andrei Medvedev and Christian Bergström, accused Becker of distracting them by raising his hand (in Bergstrom's case during a point) and stalling. Becker lost in straight sets in the semis to Ivanisevic.

=== 1995–1996: Revival ===
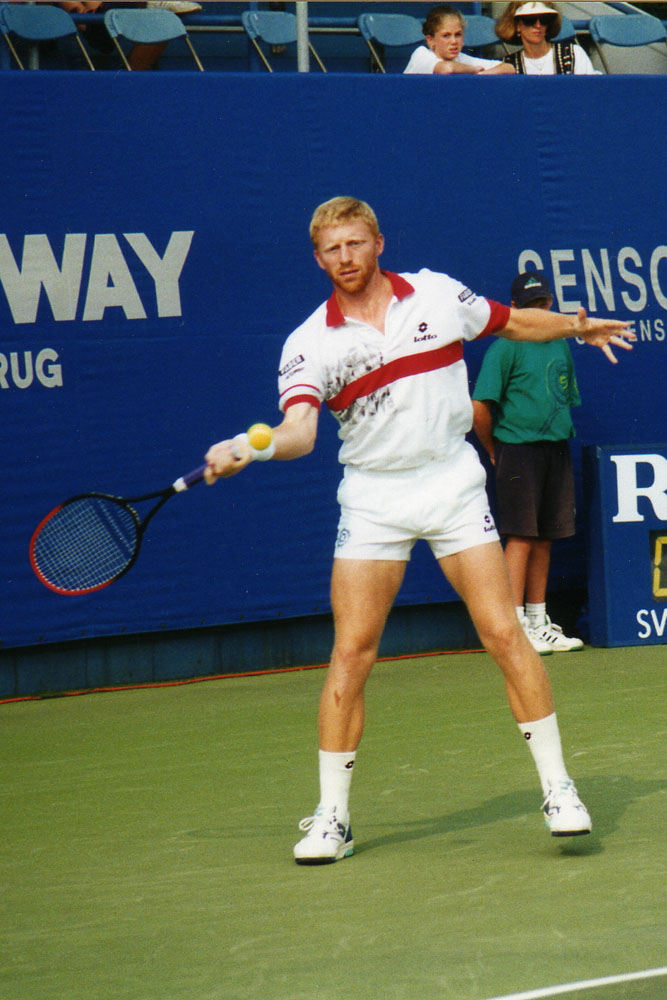
Becker in 1994

In 1995, Becker reached the Wimbledon final for the seventh time. He won a baseline contest with Cédric Pioline in the quarter finals in five sets. Against Andre Agassi in the semi-finals, Becker was down a set and two breaks, but eventually won in four sets. He lost the final in four sets to Pete Sampras, losing his serve five times. "Unfortunately, he owns the Centre Court now. I used to own it a few years back, but it belongs to him now" said Becker afterwards. At the US Open, Agassi beat Becker in the semi finals in four sets. Becker won the year-end ATP Tour World Championships for the third and last time in Frankfurt with a straight-set win over Michael Chang in the final.

In 1996, Becker's sixth and final Grand Slam title came as he defeated Chang in the final of the Australian Open. After winning the Queen's Club Championships for the fourth time, Becker was widely expected to mount a serious challenge for the Wimbledon title in 1996, but his bid ended abruptly when he damaged his right wrist during a third-round match against Neville Godwin and was forced to withdraw. Becker defeated Sampras in October 1996 in a five-set final in Stuttgart Masters. "Becker is the best indoor player I've ever played", said Sampras after the match. Becker lost to Sampras in the final of the 1996 ATP Tour World Championships in Hanover, although Becker saved two match points in the fourth set and held serve 27 consecutive times until he was broken in the penultimate game. Later that year he won the Grand Slam Cup defeating Goran Ivanišević in the final.

=== 1997–1999: Last years on tour ===
In 1997, Becker lost to Sampras in the quarterfinals at Wimbledon and announced his Grand Slam retirement, though he continued playing in other events. Becker lost to Agassi in the final at Hong Kong in 1999. Becker played Wimbledon one more time in 1999, this time losing in the fourth round to the number two seed, Patrick Rafter on Centre Court. This was his final career match. Becker received a standing ovation from the Royal Box in what was to become his final appearance at the tournament.

=== Career summary ===
Becker was most comfortable playing on fast-playing surfaces, particularly grass courts and indoor carpet (on which he won 26 titles). He reached a few singles finals playing on clay courts but never managed to win a title on such surface; he also reached the semi-finals of the French Open thrice. Becker won an Olympic Gold Medal on clay court in doubles competition alongside compatriot Michael Stich at the 1992 Barcelona Games. Becker was close to winning a singles clay-court tournament in his last final on the surface, when he led Thomas Muster by two sets to love in the 1995 Monte Carlo Open final, and double-faulted on match point in the fourth-set tiebreaker.

Over the course of his career, Becker won 49 singles titles and 15 doubles titles. Besides his six Grand Slam titles, he was also a singles winner in the year-end Masters / ATP Tour World Championships in 1988, 1992, and 1995, the WCT Finals in 1988 and at the Grand Slam Cup in 1996. He won a record-equaling four singles titles at London's Queen's Club. In Davis Cup, his career win–loss record was 54–12, including 38–3 in singles. He also won the other two major international team titles playing for Germany, the Hopman Cup (in 1995) and the World Team Cup (in 1989 and 1998). He is the first male player to appear in 7 Wimbledon finals in the Modern Era, tied by Sampras in 2000, and behind the 10 Wimbledon finals reached by Djokovic and the record 12 Wimbledon finals appearances by Federer.

Becker won singles titles in 14 countries: Australia, Austria, Belgium, Canada, France, Germany, Italy, Japan, Netherlands, Qatar, Sweden, Switzerland, United Kingdom, United States. In 2003, he was inducted into the International Tennis Hall of Fame. He occasionally plays on the senior tour and in World Team Tennis. After his career, he also took part in exhibition matches as Michael Stich and in 2005 they answered questions from the journalist and radio presenter Marc Engelhard about the state of tennis. He has also worked as a commentator at Wimbledon for the BBC.

=== Playing style ===
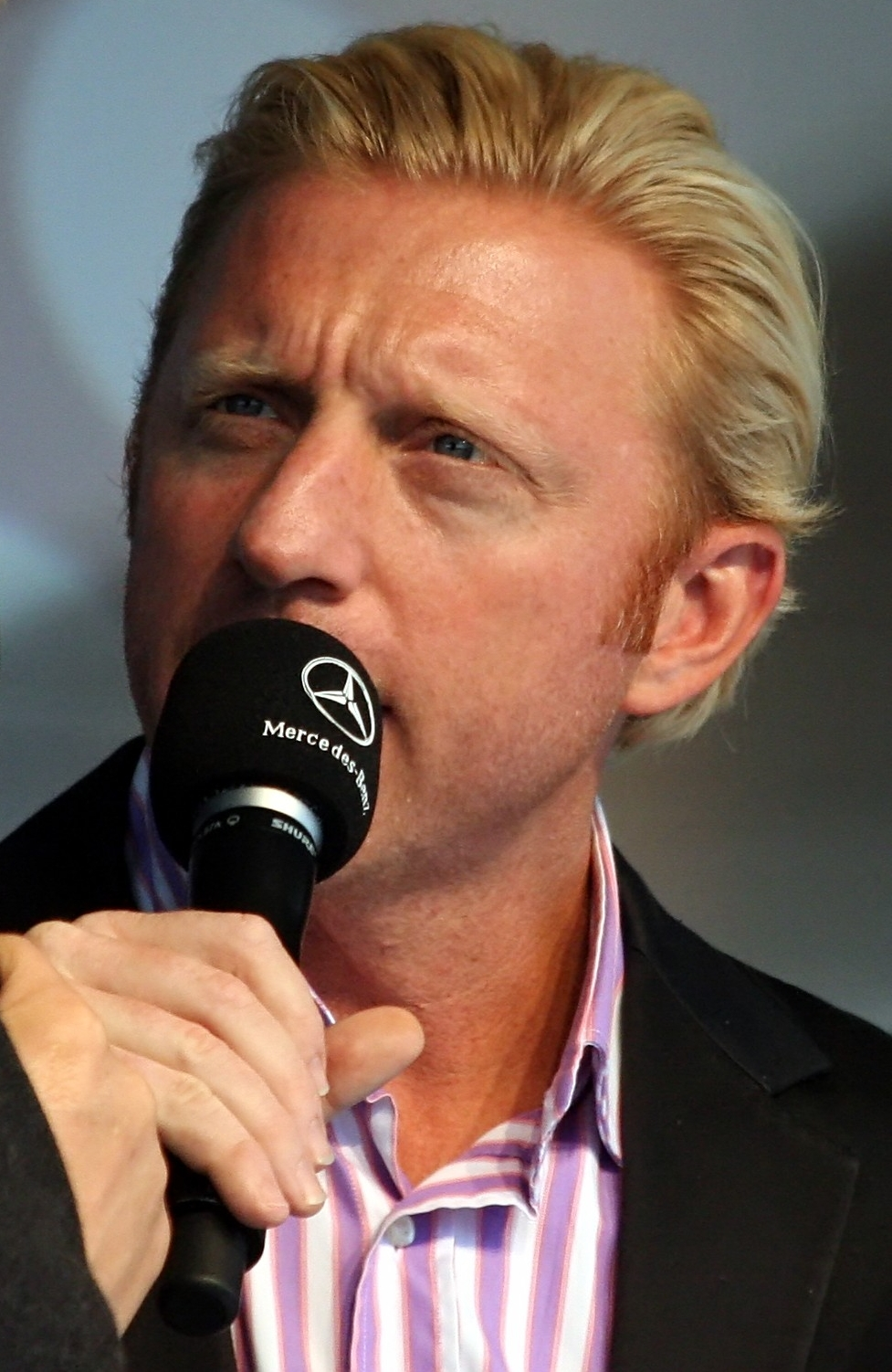
Becker at Stars & Cars, Stuttgart, 2007

Becker's game was based on a fast and well-placed serve, that earned him the nicknames "Boom Boom", "Der Bomber" and "Baron von Slam".

While serving he tended to stick his tongue out in a way that could inform his opponent where he was aiming, an observation that Andre Agassi revealed only after Becker had retired.

Becker occasionally deviated from his serve-and-volley style to try to out-hit, from the baseline, opponents who normally were at their best while remaining near the baseline. Even though Becker possessed powerful shots from both wings, this strategy was often criticized by commentators.

Becker had frequent emotional outbursts on court. Whenever he considered himself to be playing badly, he often swore at himself and occasionally smashed his rackets. In 1987, he was fined $2000 following a series of outbursts during the Australian Open in Melbourne, including breaking three rackets, "twice throwing the ball in an offensive manner at the umpire, hitting the umpire's chair on one occasion, spitting water in the direction of the umpire, and hitting three balls out of the court." Becker's highly dramatic play spawned new expressions such as the Becker Blocker (his trademark early return shot), the Becker Hecht (a flying lunge), the Becker Faust ("Becker Fist"), the Becker Shuffle (the dance he sometimes performed after making important points), and Becker Säge ("Becker Saw" – referring to the way in which he pumped his fists in a sawing motion).

== Career statistics ==
=== Singles performance timeline ===
Key
**W**	F	SF	QF	#R	RR	Q#	DNQ	A	NH

(W) winner; (F) finalist; (SF) semifinalist; (QF) quarterfinalist; (#R) rounds 4, 3, 2, 1; (RR) round-robin stage; (Q#) qualification round; (DNQ) did not qualify; (A) absent; (NH) not held; (SR) strike rate (events won / competed); (W–L) win–loss record.

	West Germany								Germany											
Tournament	1983	1984	1985	1986	1987	1988	1989	1990	1991	1992	1993	1994	1995	1996	1997	1998	1999	SR	W–L	Win %
**Grand Slam tournaments**
Australian Open	A	QF	2R	NH	4R	A	4R	QF	**W**	3R	1R	A	1R	**W**	1R	A	A	2 / 11	29–9	76%
French Open	A	A	2R	QF	SF	4R	SF	1R	SF	A	2R	A	3R	A	A	A	A	0 / 9	26–9	74%
Wimbledon	A	3R	**W**	**W**	2R	F	**W**	F	F	QF	SF	SF	F	3R	QF	A	4R	3 / 15	71–12	86%
US Open	A	A	4R	SF	4R	2R	**W**	SF	3R	4R	4R	1R	SF	A	A	A	A	1 / 11	37–10	79%
**Win–loss**	**0–0**	**6–2**	**11–3**	**16–2**	**11–4**	**10–3**	**22–2**	**15–4**	**20–3**	**9–3**	**9–4**	**5–2**	**13–4**	**9–1**	**4–2**	**0–0**	**3–1**	**6 / 46**	**163–40**	**80%**
**Year-end championships**
Tennis Masters Cup	DNQ		F	F	RR	**W**	F	SF	RR	**W**	DNQ	F	**W**	F	did not qualify			3 / 11	36–13	73%
WCT Finals	did not qualify			F	A	**W**	A	discontinued										1 / 2	5–1	83%
**Win–loss**	**0–0**	**0–0**	**3–1**	**6–2**	**1–2**	**7–1**	**4–1**	**3–1**	**2–1**	**4–1**	**0–1**	**5–2**	**6–2**	**7–2**	**0–1**	**0–0**	**0–0**	**5 / 18**	**48–18**	**73%**
Year-end ranking	563	66	6	**2**	5	4	**2**	**2**	**3**	5	11	**3**	4	6	62	69	131	**$25,080,956**		

=== Records ===
- These records were attained in Open Era of tennis.
- Records in **bold** indicate peer-less achievements.
- ^ Denotes consecutive streak.

Championship	Years	Record accomplished	Player tied
Wimbledon	1985	Youngest Wimbledon singles champion	**Stands alone**
Wimbledon	1985	unseeded winner of singles title	Goran Ivanišević
Grand Prix	1986	3 titles in three weeks across three continents (Sydney, Tokyo, Paris)	**Stands alone**
ATP Championship series (aka ATP 500 tournaments)	1990	4 titles won in a single season	Juan Martín del Potro; Stefan Edberg
Stockholm Open	1988, 1990–1991, 1994	4 singles titles	John McEnroe

== Place in history ==
Tennis magazine ranked Becker the 11th best male player of the 1965–2005 period.

Boris Becker holds the unique record of being the last player to win Wimbledon with white balls (1985) and the first to win with yellow balls (1986)

== Professional awards ==
- ITF World Champion: 1989.
- ATP Player of the Year: 1989.
- ATP Most Improved Player: 1985.

== Post-retirement ==
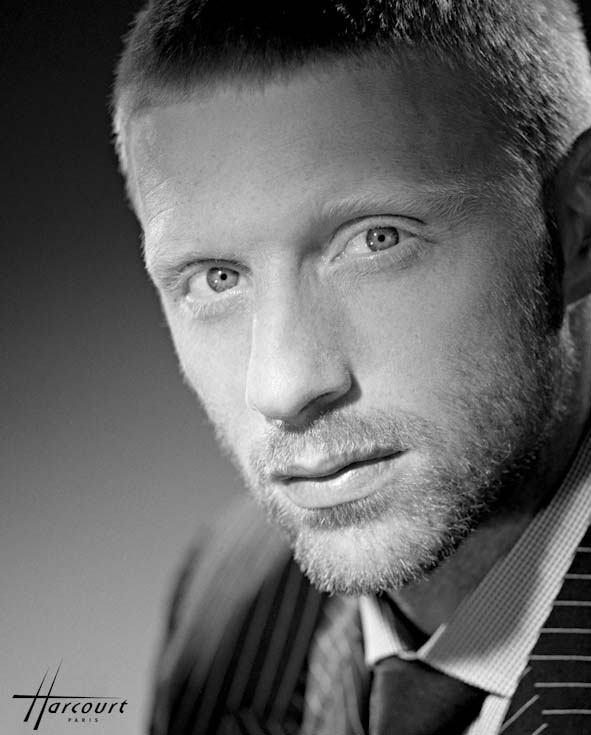
Becker photographed by Studio Harcourt

=== Tax evasion conviction ===
Becker was found guilty by the Munich District Court of deliberately making false statements regarding his place of residence on his personal income tax filings in order to save DM3.3 million.

A criminal investigation into his tax affairs began in December 1996 while he was still an active professional tennis player. By the time German prosecutors filed charges of tax evasion against the tennis star in July 2002, Becker had already retired from the sport. The retired tennis player, who had earned over US$25 million in prize money plus millions in endorsements, was originally charged with withholding taxes of DM10.4 million (US$5 million), however, the trial ended up being for the considerably lower sum of DM3.3 million (€1.6 million) for which prosecutors believed they had evidence. The trial was to focus on where Becker lived between 1991 and 1993 (his tax filings claimed Monaco while the prosecution had evidence of the player in fact spending the majority of that time in the Munich area).

On his day in court on 23 October 2002, 34-year-old Becker admitted to living in Munich between 1991 and 1993 despite being officially registered in Monaco, however, maintaining he could not be accused of withholding income or engaging in criminal machinations. As part of his defence, Becker emphasized that his property where he stayed in Munich was not a standard apartment but a "spartan flat with just a bed and no refrigerator" being part of his sister's property where he stayed when visiting her. It also emerged that he had been warned against purchasing the Munich apartment, but ignored the warnings. The player also told the court that the financial investigations that had begun in December 1996 played a role in his decision to retire from tennis due to "countless raids of [his] house and office" and that he "hasn't won any tournaments since then and ended [his] career".

Simultaneously with Becker's testimony, his lawyer presented the court with evidence that a week prior to his court date, Becker had paid around €3 million in back taxes, far exceeding the DM3.3 million (€1.6 million) amount he was in the dock for. Despite the admission, as well as the payment, both seen as part of an attempt to settle the six-year process with a lighter sentence, the prosecution still asked the court for a sentence of three years and six months in jail.

One day later, on 24 October 2002, the Munich District Court judge Huberta Knöringer gave Becker a two-year prison sentence, the execution of which was suspended. Additionally, his sentence included a fine of €300,000 and another €200,000 to various charitable institutions.

=== Investments ===
Since 2000, Becker has been the principal owner of the tennis division of Völkl Inc., a tennis racket and clothing manufacturer.

Also in 2000, Becker partnered up with the German IT company Pixelpark AG for a joint dot-com investment: Sportgate.de, a German-language website covering local, regional and national sporting scene in Germany. The venture shut down during summer 2001, less than a year into its operation, amid reports of Becker's business partner, Pixelpark's CEO Paulus Neef who owned a 35% stake in Sportgate, failing to come up with a promised £1m cash injection. Paulus countered with a lawsuit against Becker in the Munich regional court for feeling "conned".

Becker's autobiography, Augenblick, verweile doch... (en: The Player) was published in 2003. It included details of his 1999 sexual encounter with the Russian waitress Angela Ermakova that triggered the eventual end of his marriage to Feltus and the admission of addiction to painkillers and sleeping pills during some of his tennis career. The book made The Sunday Times bestseller list.

In June 2015, another Becker autobiography, Boris Becker's Wimbledon: My Life and Career at the All England Club, was published with a foreword by the world's number 1 player and reigning Wimbledon champion Novak Djokovic whom Becker coached at the time.

=== Tennis pundit and media personality ===
==== BBC ====
In 2002, Becker became a commentator for the BBC at Wimbledon—a job he continued doing until 2021 (apart from the 2014, 2015, and 2016 seasons when he coached Novak Djokovic). He moved to the United Kingdom from his native Germany in 2012, making London his primary residence.

From October 2005 to June 2006, Becker was a team captain on the British TV sports quiz show They Think It's All Over on BBC One. He appeared on the second episode of series 16 of the BBC's car show Top Gear as the Star in a Reasonably Priced Car.

==== Eurosport ====
From 2017, Becker began appearing on Eurosport regularly as part of its English-language Grand Slam coverage or on his own German-language commentary show Matchball Becker. Weeks after Becker's mid December 2022 release from UK jail and deportation to Germany, Eurosport announced his re-hiring ahead of their 2023 Australian Open coverage.

=== Administrative work ===
After retiring from playing tennis, Becker served on the economic advisory board of Bayern Munich for over ten years.

On 23 August 2017, Becker was named the head of men's tennis of the German Tennis Federation (DTB).

Becker is a patron of the Elton John AIDS Foundation.

=== Poker ===
Becker is a noted poker player and has appeared in the European Poker Tour and the World Poker Tour; by 2013, he had won more than €90,000 in career earnings from poker. From November 2007 to mid-May 2013, Becker was a member of the celebrity team for the online poker platform PokerStars, where he participated in professional poker tournaments. Becker made his first appearance as a poker amateur at a tournament in Monte Carlo in April 2008. In mid-April, he entered the Main Event of the World Poker Tour at the Bellagio and finished the tournament in 40th place, winning more than $40,000 in prize money.

In August 2011, he came 97th at the European Poker Tour in Barcelona, winning €8,000. In April 2013, he again took part in the EPT Main Event, this time in Berlin, coming 49th with a win of €15,000. As of August 2018, Becker has made tournament earnings of over $100,000 and was ranked 132,133rd in the Global Poker Index. He became an ambassador for the partypoker online poker platform, playing under the nickname Boris__Becker.

=== Coaching Novak Djokovic ===
In December 2013, Novak Djokovic announced on his website that Boris Becker would become his head coach for the 2014 season. As a result, Becker gave up his commentating job with the BBC. In December 2016, Djokovic and Becker parted ways. Over the three seasons they had worked together, Becker contributed to Djokovic's six Grand Slam titles and 14 Masters 1000 titles. Djokovic also won the French Open in 2016 – the only Grand Slam singles title which Becker never won himself.

=== Bankruptcy ===
On 21 June 2017, Becker was declared bankrupt by the Bankruptcy and Companies Court in London. The order arose when a 2015 debt—centered around an unpaid loan on Becker's estate in Mallorca, Spain—owed to private bank Arbuthnot Latham for nearly $14 million was not paid in full before an assigned deadline, and there was no realistic expectation that it would be paid. Becker denied to the Neue Zürcher Zeitung that he was "broke" or that he owed former business adviser Hans-Dieter Cleven any money; Cleven filed suit in a Swiss court claiming he was owed $41 million.

In June 2018, Becker's lawyers claimed their client had diplomatic immunity in the bankruptcy case owing to his appointment as the Central African Republic's (CAR) "Attaché for Sports/Humanitarian/Cultural Affairs in the European Union". Charles-Armel Doubane, the CAR's Foreign Minister, countered that Becker was "not an official diplomat for the Central African Republic", that the role of attaché for sports "does not exist", and that the CAR passport produced by Becker was one of a batch that had been stolen in 2014. In September 2019, the German businessman Stephan Welk who provided the passport was detained for possible fraud.

On 21 May 2019, Smith & Williamson announced that it had instructed its agent Wyles Hardy to auction Becker's trophies and memorabilia on 11 July 2019. On 24 June 2019, it was reported that Becker was forced to auction off 82 collectables from his personal collection, including a Goldene Kamera award and his trophy from the 1989 US Open, in order to pay creditors. On 11 July 2019, an online auction of Becker's memorabilia was held, raising £687,000, according to the company dealing with his bankruptcy.

On 5 November 2019, the bankruptcy restrictions were extended for an additional 12 years, until 16 October 2031, after Becker was judged to have been hiding assets and transactions worth over £4.5 million.

=== Imprisonment ===
Becker was charged with illegally failing to hand over assets and trophies with a value of £2.5 million to repay debt during his bankruptcy, and on 21 March 2022, his trial began at Southwark Crown Court, London. On 8 April 2022, Becker was found guilty of four charges under the Insolvency Act. On 29 April 2022, he was sentenced to 30 months' imprisonment for the offences. His incarceration commenced at HM Prison Wandsworth in South London, before he was transferred to HM Prison Huntercombe, a facility used to detain foreign criminals. Becker was released from prison on 15 December 2022 having served 8 months. The same day he was understood to have been deported to Germany, as he was eligible for automatic deportation having received a custodial sentence of more than 12 months. There have been conflicting reports about his future eligibility to enter the UK, with some reports stating that he would have been able to return to the UK in October 2024 at the earliest, and others stating that he is barred from entering the country for ten years.

=== Documentary ===
Becker is the subject of a two-part 2023 Alex Gibney documentary Boom! Boom! The World vs. Boris Becker, the first part of which premiered at the 2023 Berlin International Film Festival.

== Personal life ==
The Guardian reported in 2009 that in addition to properties in Munich, Monaco, and Schwyz, Becker had an apartment in Wimbledon, and possibly still maintained a residence in Miami, to be near his children. As of 2017, Becker lived in Wimbledon, within walking distance of the championship grounds.

=== Relationships ===
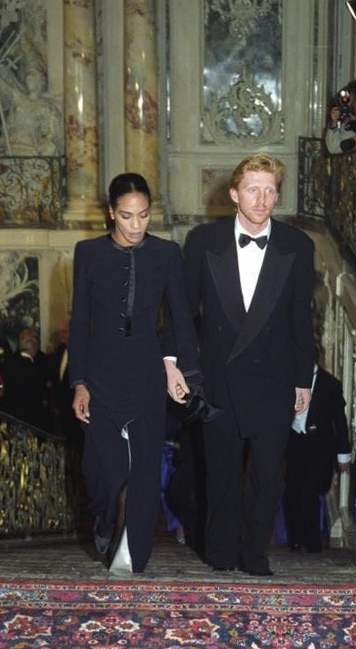
Becker with Barbara Feltus in 1992

Becker married Barbara Feltus in December 1993. Before the marriage, they shocked some in Germany by posing nude for the cover of Stern in a picture taken by her father. They had two sons Noah (born 1994) and Elias (born 1999). After Becker asked Barbara for a separation in December 2000, she flew to Miami, Florida, with Noah and Elias and filed a divorce petition in Miami-Dade County Court, after being contacted by a woman claiming to be pregnant with Becker's child. In his autobiography, Becker stated that he admitted to his wife that he had had a one-night stand with another woman while Barbara was pregnant with their second child. Becker was granted a divorce on 15 January 2001: Barbara received a $14.4 million settlement, their condominium on Fisher Island, Florida, and custody of their children.

In February 2001, Becker acknowledged paternity of a daughter, Anna Ermakova, with a Russian waitress at London's Nobu restaurant, Angela Ermakova, after media reported that he had a child as a result of a sexual encounter in 1999. Becker initially denied paternity, claiming he only had oral sex with Ermakova. His lawyers made allegations that Ermakova had stolen his sperm and used it to inseminate herself after the encounter. Subsequently, he reversed his stance and accepted fatherhood. Some time after that, a DNA test confirmed he was the father. In November 2007, he obtained joint custody of Anna after expressing concerns over how Ermakova was raising her.

Becker was briefly engaged to Alessandra Meyer-Wölden in 2008 before splitting up. Her father, Axel Meyer-Wölden, was Becker's former adviser and manager.

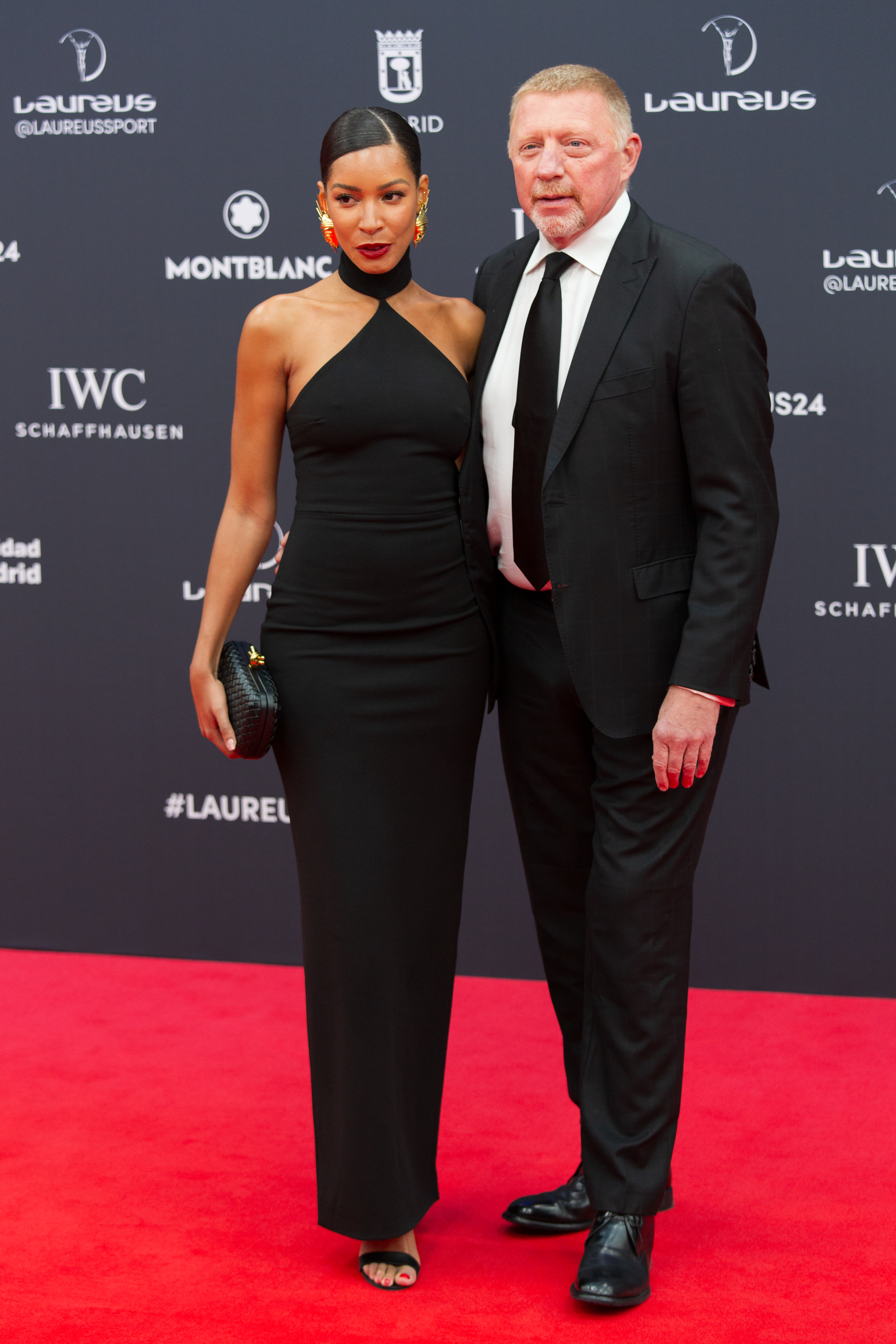
Becker with Lilian de Carvalho in 2024

In June 2009, Becker married Dutch model Sharlely "Lilly" Kerssenberg in St. Moritz, Switzerland. Their son, Amadeus was born in London in 2010. In May 2018, Kerssenberg and Becker announced that they had separated with both accusing the other of "unreasonable behaviour". Both issued divorce petitions. Following Becker's release from prison, in a February 2023 interview for the Bild newspaper, Becker's estranged wife Kerssenberg accused the retired tennis player of not paying child support for their 13-year-old son.

In September 2024, Becker married his third wife Lilian de Carvalho Monteiro.

== See also ==
- Becker–Edberg rivalry

Sporting positions
Preceded by Stefan Edberg; Stefan Edberg	World No. 1; 28 January 1991 – 17 February 1991; 8 July 1991 – 8 September 1991	Succeeded by Stefan Edberg; Stefan Edberg
Awards and achievements
Preceded by not awarded, 1984; Jimmy Arias, 1983	ATP Most Improved Player; 1985	Succeeded by Mikael Pernfors
Preceded by Seve Ballesteros	BBC Overseas Sports Personality of the Year; 1985	Succeeded by Greg Norman
Preceded by Michael Groß; Michael Groß	German Sportsman of the Year; 1985 – 1986; 1989 – 1990	Succeeded by Harald Schmid; Michael Stich
Preceded by Mats Wilander	ATP Player of the Year; 1989	Succeeded by Stefan Edberg
Preceded by Mats Wilander	ITF World Champion; 1989	Succeeded by Ivan Lendl
Preceded by Matt Biondi	United Press International; Athlete of the Year; 1989	Succeeded by Stefan Edberg
