= Pieter De Bruyne =

- Pieter De Bruyne in conversation.

Pieter De Bruyne (1931 –1987) was a Flemish artist, designer and interior architect.

== Life ==
De Bruyne was born in Aalst, Belgium. In 1953, he graduated as an interior architect from the Sint-Lucas School in Brussels. In 1955–56 and 1957, he participated in the salons of modern social furniture in Ghent, and in 1958, he received the Golden Mark. At this time, De Bruyne also did an internship at Studio Giò Ponti in Milan. In 1959, he received an honourable mention in the international furniture competition of Cantù. In 1960, De Bruyne won a prize with chair designs in the European Arflex – Domus competition in Milan. In 1961, he won another prize at Cantù with a dining room design. He held exhibitions in Belgium and abroad and took on the most diverse assignments.

De Bruyne taught at the St.-Lukas Institute in Schaarbeek, and received a state prize in 1984 for his artistic career. The entire archive of his work is owned by the Design Museum Gent.

== Work ==
On the occasion of an exhibit in the Saint Peter's Abbey in Ghent in 1976, Jan Pieter Ballegeer writes: "But what is the message of De Bruyne's furniture? There is, first and foremost, an attack of sorts on the familiar itself, an annihilation, if you will, of the common. There is a distortion of objects as one sees in dadaism, surrealism and pop-art. However, De Bruyne's deformation is not characteristically expressionistic, not mainly meant to be understood immediately, but rather delicately mysterious and complexly aesthetic, ingeniously manneristic. The designer's artistic self-awareness lends to his furniture a remarkable monumentality? Their nature almost demands that they not be placed against walls or in corners, but that they stand free in space, like sculptures."

=== Pioneer of the postmodern ===
De Bruyne's projects from the period 1970 to 1987 are linked to the postmodern school in architecture and design. The best-known designers in this respect are Studio Alchimia and the Memphis Group (Alessandro Mendini, A. Branzi, Ettore Sottsass). Bruyne had already started this type of work in 1970, whereas Studio Alchimia and the Memphis Group only developed their activities a decade later. This is why some call De Bruyne a precursor of postmodern furniture.

=== Chantilly cabinet ===
De Bruyne was paid homage in the exhibition Postmodernism: Style and Subversion 1970–1990 in the London Victoria and Albert Museum (2011–2012), where his Chantilly cabinet (1975) took up a prominent place.

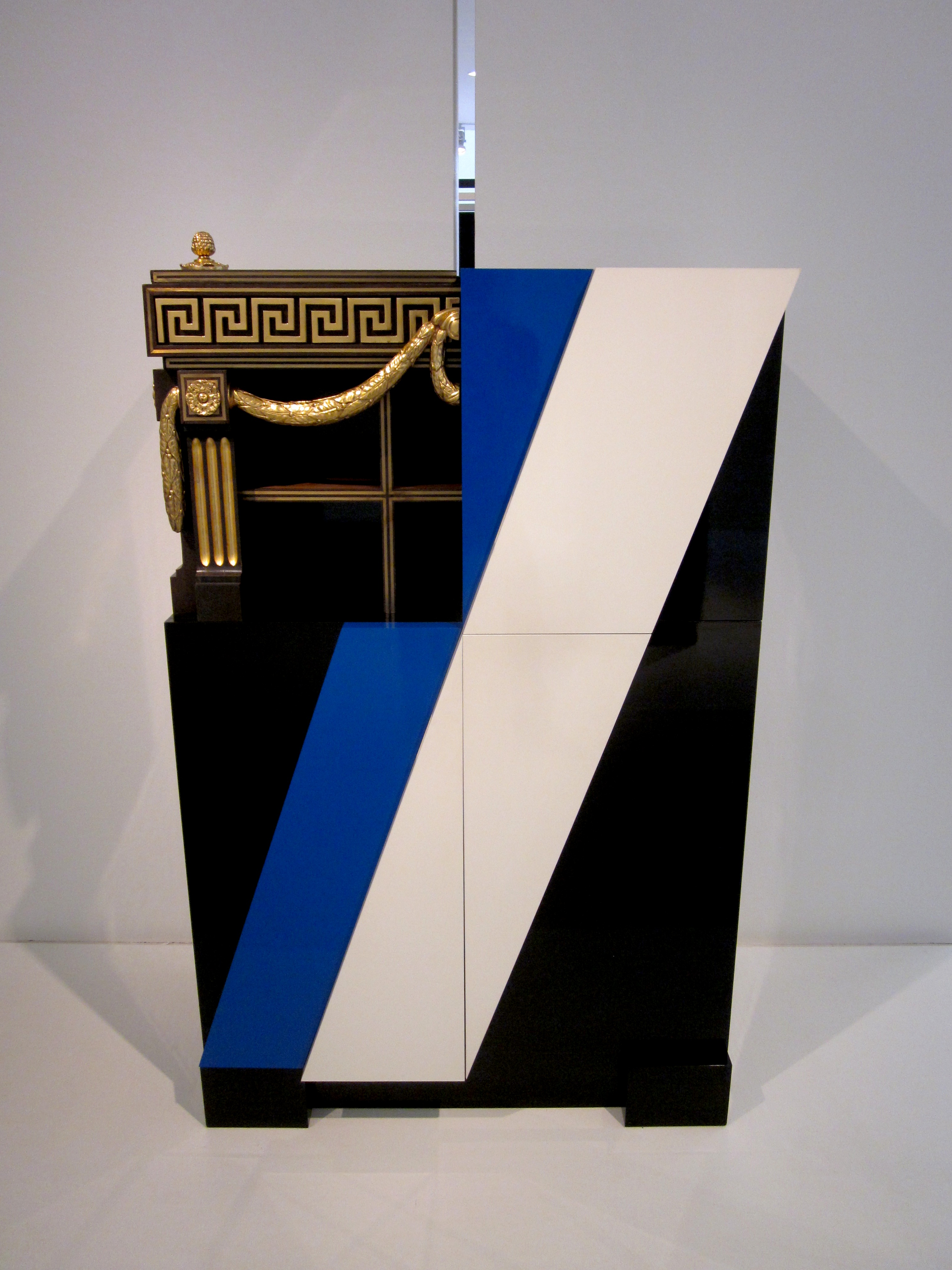
Chantilly cabinet 1975

=== Egypt ===
In 1974, a special interest in Egypt took hold. De Bruyne looked into the meaning of Egyptian contributions to furniture history. Like a scientist, he collected data about pieces of Egyptian furniture, analysed and compared it. A decade worth of numerous measurements resulted in hundreds of drawings about the furniture's structure. Based on these drawings, he made mathematical and structural analyses. In 1985, De Bruyne stated he supposedly found the key to the secret canon and deciphered the underlying laws of Egyptian furniture, painting and sculpture. Moreover, his findings would serve as a basis for the understanding of Egyptian pyramids from a rational and mathematical perspective. De Bruyne planned a book with the results of his studies by the end of 1985, but obstacles complicated the completion of his work. In February 1987, De Bruyne passed away. In 1982, he used the Egyptian measuring system in his own designs. By the end of his career, he would apply the entire canon to his work.

=== Furniture and objects ===
De Bruyne designed an unprecedented number of furniture pieces and objects, over 200 of which were realised. He also designed more than 175 interiors and architectural projects, as well as five chandeliers for Arteluce (Gino Sarfatti) and Stilnovo. De Bruyne's furniture has been exhibited both at home and abroad, including Los Angeles, London, Mainz, Zurich, Bari and Amsterdam. In 2022, his work made its debut at the art and design fair PAD Paris.

== De Bruyne residence ==
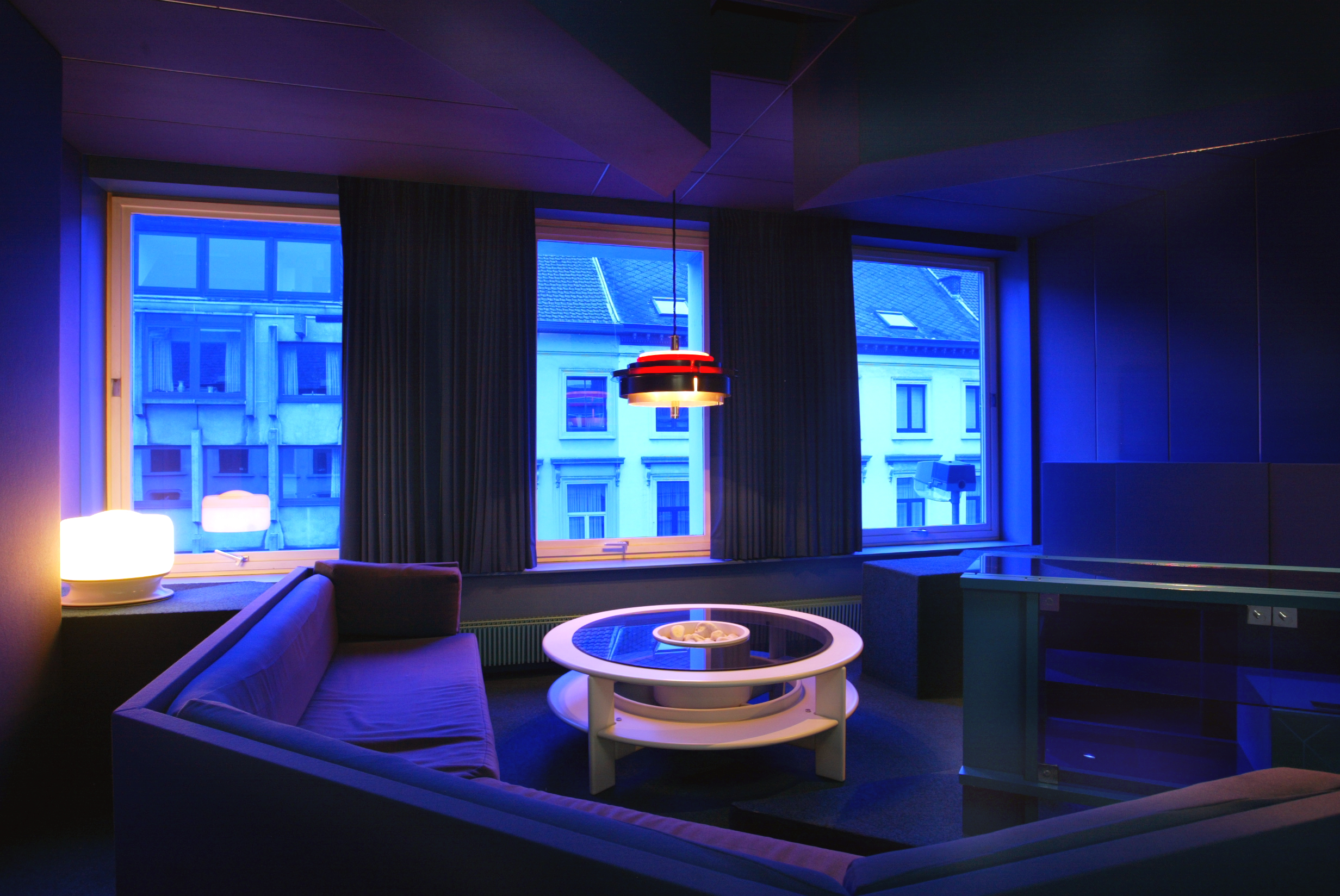
Blue room Pieter De Bruyne residence 1972

In 1972, he renovated a neoclassicistic townhouse in Aalst, turning it into a work residence. In 2008 the building was protected as a monument. The designer named several rooms after a special colour, which then defined their decoration, such as the blue room.

== Van Schuylenbergh residence ==
From 1979 to 1986, De Bruyne delivered his final masterpiece: a townhouse in Aalst near Brussels. In 2021 the building and its entire interior were protected as monuments by the Flemish minister Matthias Diependaele. In 2022, the property received national and international attention with the publication of an article in the specialised magazines Interior Design (US) and the German Häuser. Earlier, an article also appeared in the Dutch heritage magazine Monumentaal.

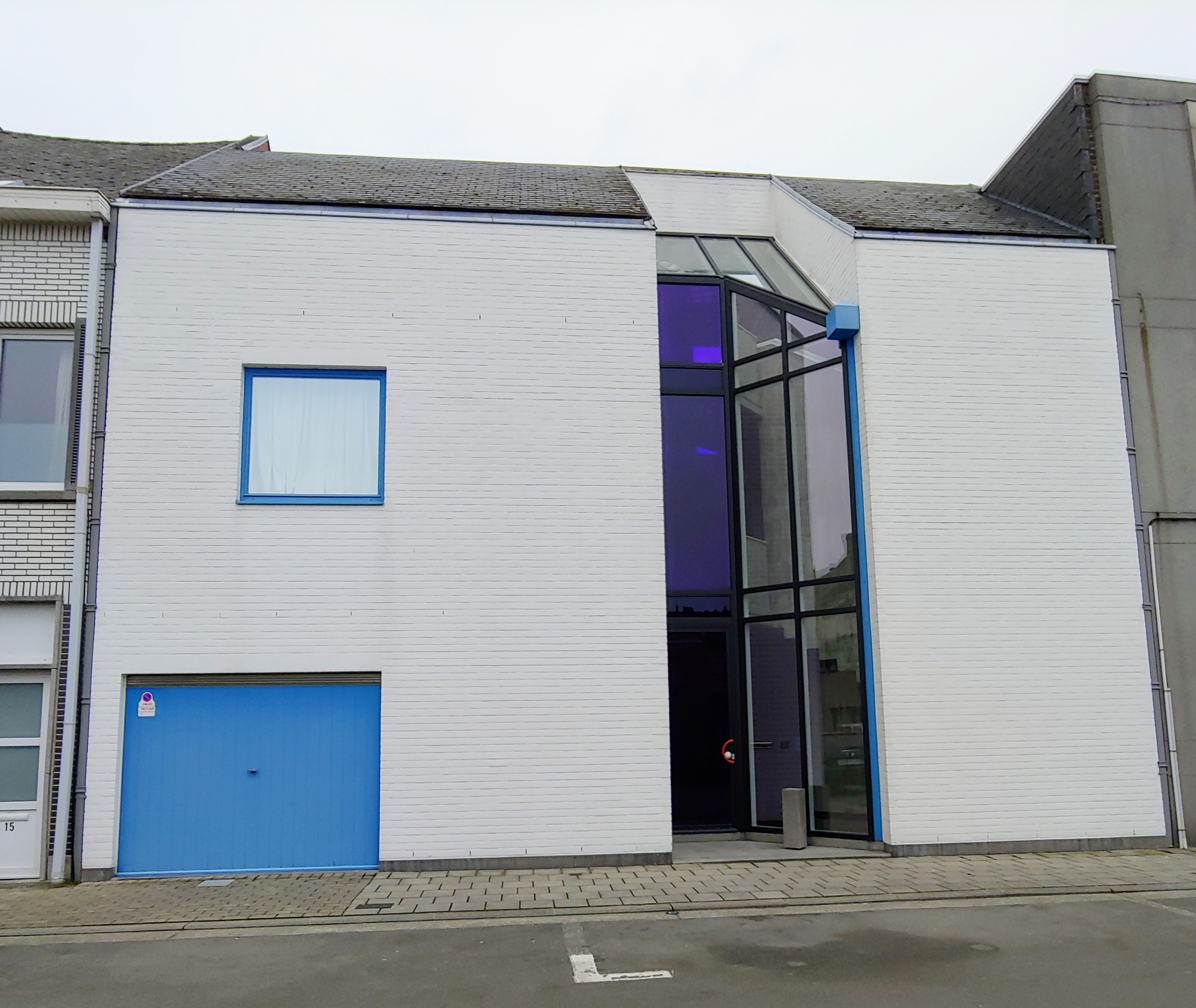
Van Schuylenbergh residence, 1979–1986

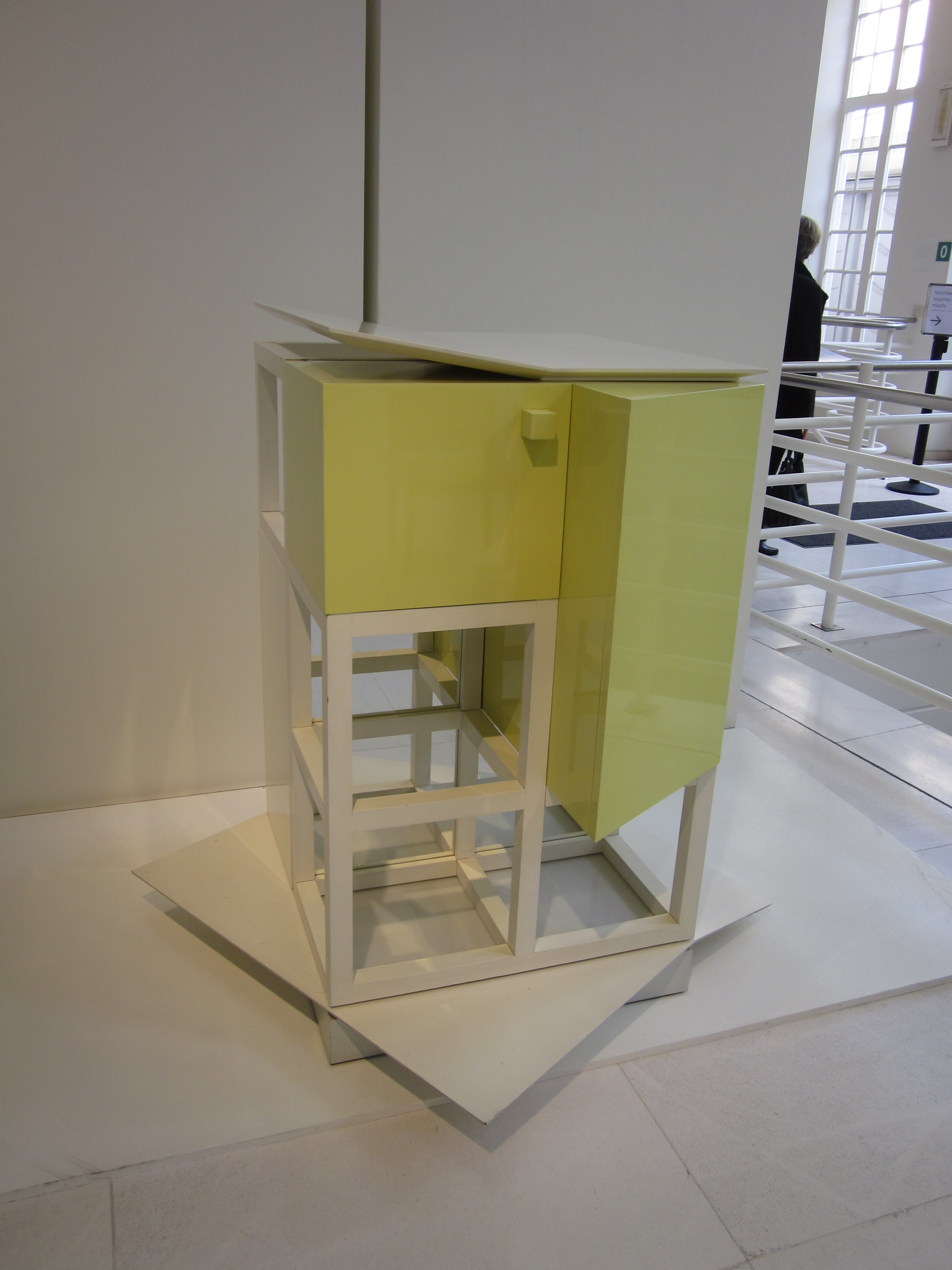
Cabinet: homage to Giò Ponti 1979

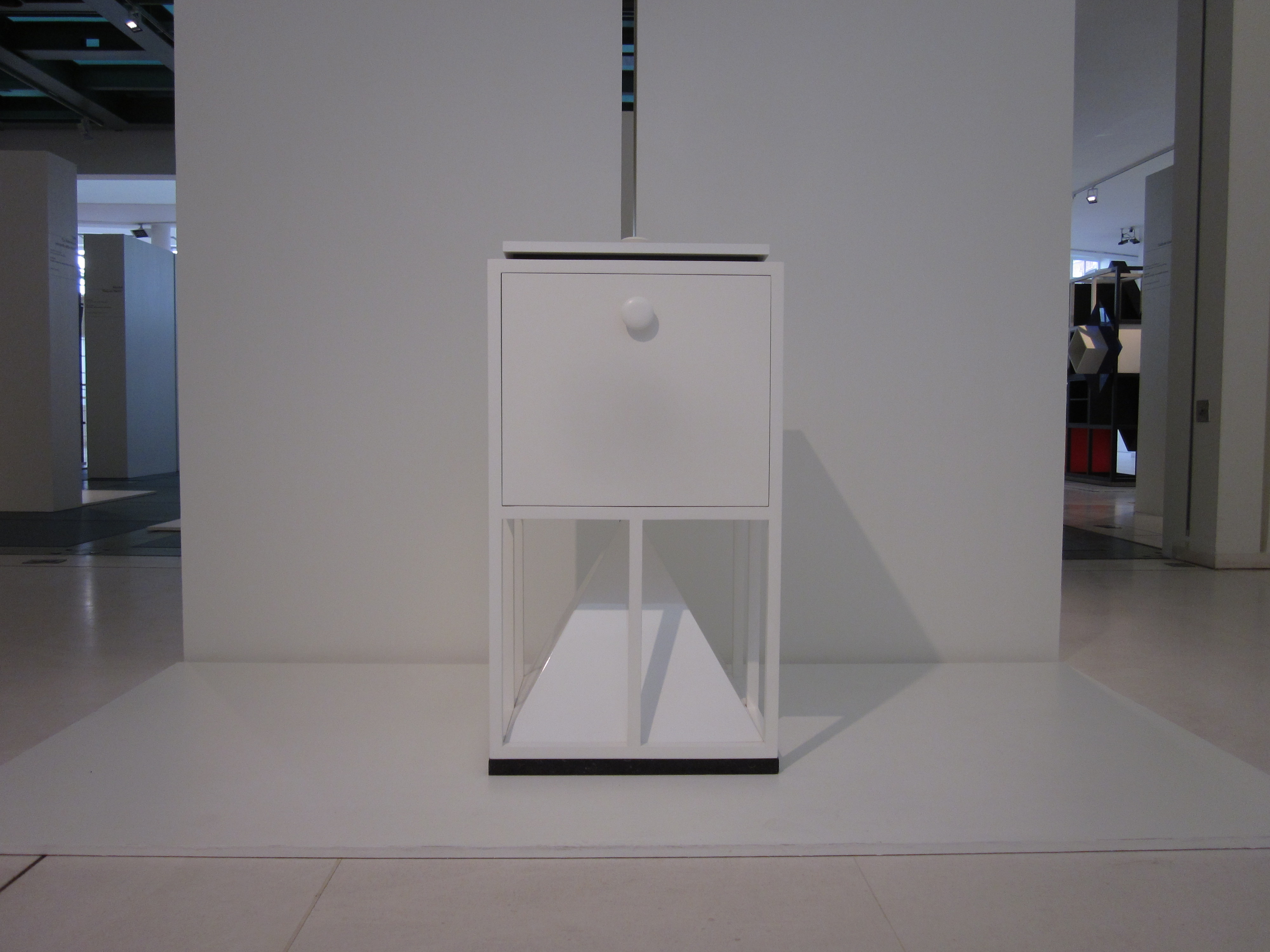
Cabinet: homage to Tutankhamun 1974

== Bibliography ==
- Schofield, M., (ed.) (1978) Decorative Art and Modern Interiors 1978, Volume 67, London, New York, 38-45. ISBN 978-0442274214
- Kieckens, Christian & Storgaard, Eva :Pieter De Bruyne – Pionier van het postmoderne, Uitg Academic & Scientific Publishers, Brussels, ISBN 9789070289300
- Gillo Dorfles "I Mobili simbolici di Pieter De Bruyne", Domus 668, gennaio 1986, 72–73.
- Sven-Claude Bettinger, "Pieter De Bruyne, Möbel-Plastiken und Interieurs für Ästheten", Raum, no. 8 1983, 2–6.
- Stefano Casciani, "Per una poetica industriale", Casa Vogue no. 171 1986, 150–151.
- Bekkers, L., (1988) Pieter De Bruyne, de ontwerper als kunstenaar, Ons Erfdeel 31.2 (March–April), 175–181.
- Daenens, L., Defour, F., (1991) Meubeldesign en kunst. Pieter De Bruyne, Frans Van Praet, Emile Veranneman, Brussels, Gemeentekrediet, 29–45.
- Dufour, Frans. Belgische meubelkunst in de XXe eeuw, van Horta tot heden, Uitg Lannoo, Tielt, ISBN D19794556
- Kieckens, C., (2000) De meubelkunst van Pieter De Bruyne, onuitgegeven nota.
- Norberg-Schulz, C., en Vanderperren, J., (1980) Pieter De Bruyne 25 jaar Meubels, Gent.
- Valcke, J., (1987) Naar de essentie van het meubel, Belgisch kreatief ambacht 23.3, 3–10.
