= Dirk Wynants =

Flemish furniture designer (born 1964)

Dirk Wynants (born 9 May 1964) is a Flemish furniture designer.

He is the son of cabinet maker and studied interior and furniture design at the Sint-Lucas, Ghent institute for architecture. In order to learn the tricks of the trade he started as an agent for international design collections. Soon he realised that there still were plenty of opportunities in the furniture trade, especially in the outdoor furniture section.

He developed and produced his first idea in his own garage in 1994. This resulted in a round table with four integrated benches, adjustable in height. As a result, children sit higher and closer to the table. Initially the materials used were: stainless steel, galvanised steel and hardwood. Wynants' first design was named Gargantua. Nowadays, this design is considered to be one of the most important design classics in outdoor furniture.

The success was huge and Wynants felt like more. He founded Extremis, a company located in West Flanders, Belgium that designs contemporary outdoor furniture. Along the years, Wynants also collaborated with other internationally renowned designers like Michael Young and Arnold Merckx.

Meanwhile Wynants has won several design awards (the renowned Henry van de Velde Award, the Interior Innovation Award for best item, the FX award, IF award, Innovation Award, Good Design award, ID Magazine Annual Design Review, Prijs voor Vormgeving van de Provincie West-Vlaanderen, FX international design award, Interior Innovation Award, IMM Köln, Red Dot Award, Henry Van De Velde Label 2006, IF award 2007) and a score of management awards (Zelfstandig Ondernemer van het Jaar 2001, Hermes Prijs 2002, Leeuw van de Export 2002, West @ Work 2006).

Prof. Dirk Wynants is a Master of Outdoor Durable Furniture and Equipments Design with The Beijing DeTao Masters Academy (DTMA), a high-level, multi-disciplined, application-oriented higher education institution in Shanghai, China.
