= Arne Quinze =

Belgian conceptual artist (born 1971)

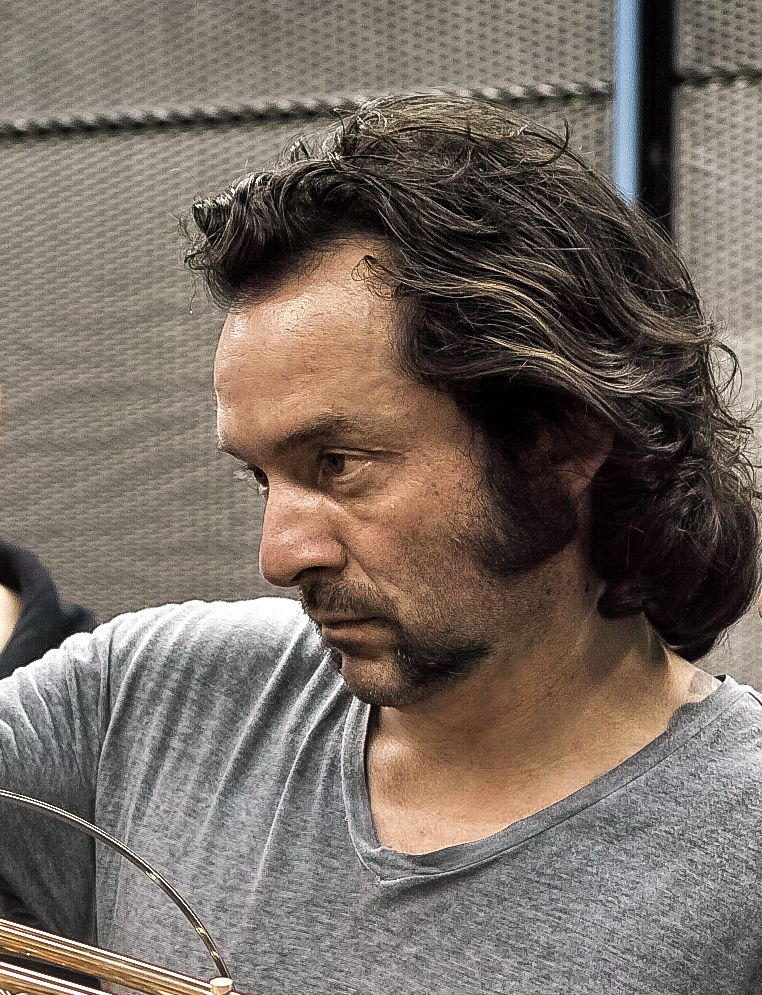
- Arne Quinze working on Natural Chaos Golden Edition V.01
- Born: 15 December 1971 (age 54); Ghent, Belgium
- Known for: Public art installations; paintings; installation art; sculptures
- Style: Contemporary art; conceptual art
- Movement: Contemporary art; environmental art
- Spouses: Barbara Becker (m. 2009; div. 2011) An Lemmens (m. 2012; div. 2015)
- Website: https://www.arnequinze.com/

Arne Quinze (born December 15, 1971) is a Belgian conceptual artist. He is known for creating large-scale public art installations consisting of sculptures made from recycled materials.

== Early life ==
Quinze was born on December 15, 1971 in Ghent, Belgium. He attended the Royal Academy of Fine Arts in Brussels but later dropped out. He then became a graffiti artist in Brussels.

== Artistic Career ==
In 2006, Quinze built Uchronia: "A Message from the Future", a large wooden sculpture shown at the Burning Man festival in Nevada. In Munich, Germany, he built Traveller (2008) for Louis Vuitton. Other public art installations include Rebirth (2008) in Paris, France, and an ongoing project at the Big Four Bridge in Louisville, Kentucky.

What follows is a partial listing of works by the artist that are or have been commissioned and/or displayed or created in public settings:

In 2009, The Stilt House artwork "The Visitor" was installed in Beirut, Lebanon near its recently developed Souk complex. The artwork was later displayed at Phillips de Pury & Company, London, and then at the Saatchi Gallery in the Duke of York's Headquarters on King's Road.

At the festival Rouen impressionnée (part of the Normandie Impressionniste festival, celebrating the region's impressionist past), Quinze painted the Les Jardins/The Waterlilies series for an exhibition in the Abbatiale de Saint-Ouen. In addition to the exhibition, an installation titled Camille was built on the Pont Boieldieu, a bridge painted several times by Camille Pissarro.

In 2011, Red Beacon was installed in the Jing'an Sculpture Park in Shanghai, China.

In 2011, the installation "My Home My House My Stilt House" was staged in Humlebaek, Denmark.

A virtual installation titled Rock Strangers was projected on the Statue of Liberty in New York City from July 4 to October 3 2011. This collaboration between Quinze and Beck's was part of their Green Box Project, co-curated, commissioned, and mentored by Nick Knight and Sam Spiegel.

During Hamburg Week, Quinze unveiled an artwork made from old, smashed porcelain symbolizing the destruction of family traditions.

In collaboration with Veridor, Quinze created Natural Chaos - Golden Edition No. 1 in 2014, an artwork consisting of 45 kilograms (99 lb) of 18-carat rose gold, 18-carat palladium white gold in rod and pipe form, golden wires and leaves.

A wooden installation entitled The Passenger was unveiled on December 6, 2014. After a partial collapse of the piece about two weeks later (on December 24), it was rebuilt and inaugurated on October 16, 2015. The installation remained visible until December 19, 2019.

== Major installations ==
Quinze has created numerous public installations around the world. Notable works include:

- Uchronia (2006) - a large temporary wooden installation built for the Burning Man festival in the Black Rock Desert, Nevada, USA.
- Cityscape (2007 - 2009) - a large temporary wooden sculpture installed in the Quartier Louise area of Brussels, Belgium.
- The Sequence (2008) - a large wooden installation on Leuvenseweg in Brussels, connecting the buildings of the Flemish Parliament with the House of Flemish Representatives.
- Red Beacon (2010) - a large wooden public installation in Jing'an Sculpture Park in Shanghai, China.

His works in public space are often temporary, though several have become permanent fixtures depending on local commissions.

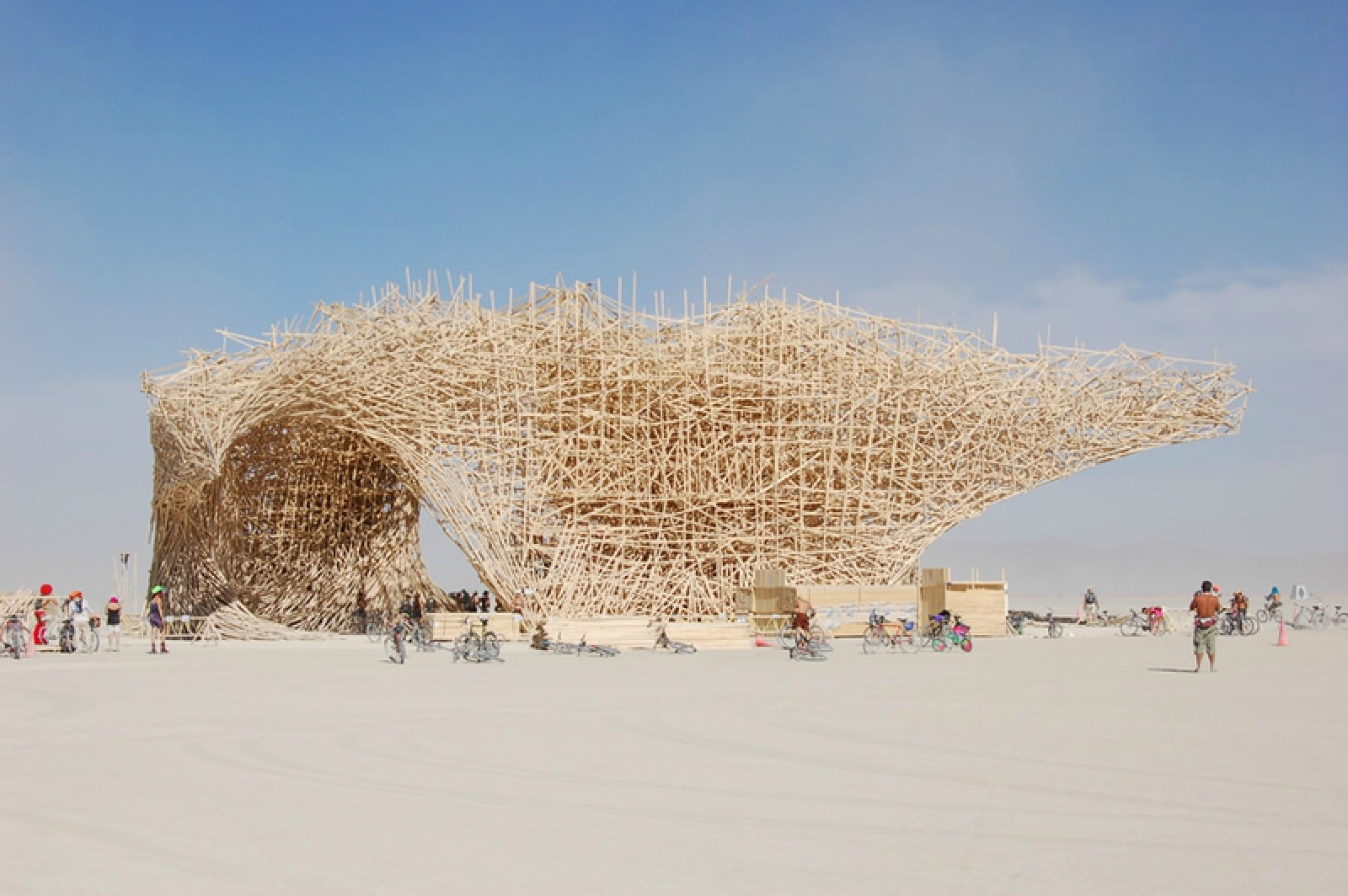
Uchronia, a large wooden sculpture at the Burning Man festival in Black Rock City, Nevada desert, United States

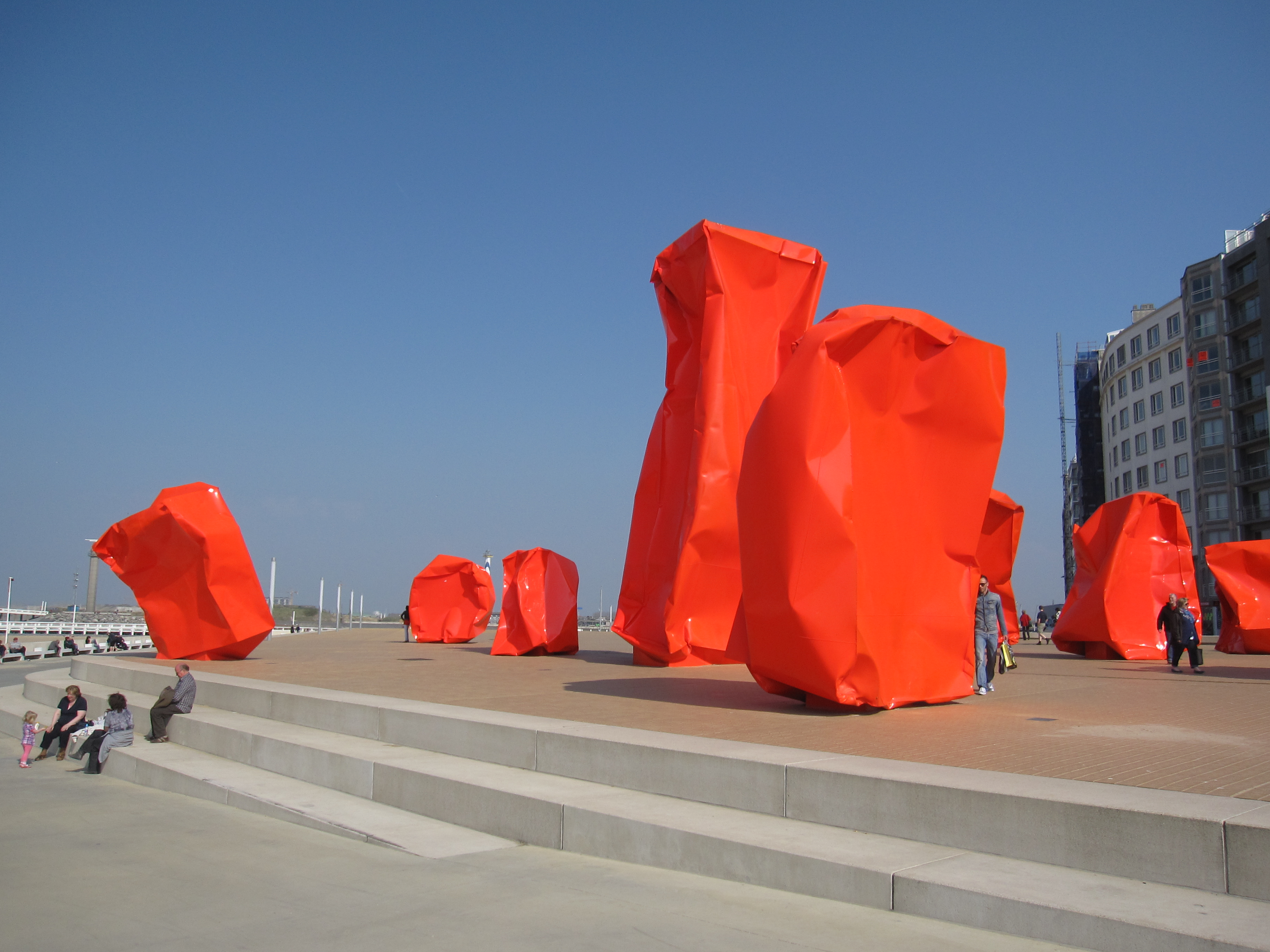
Rock Strangers, a sculpture by Quinze in Ostend

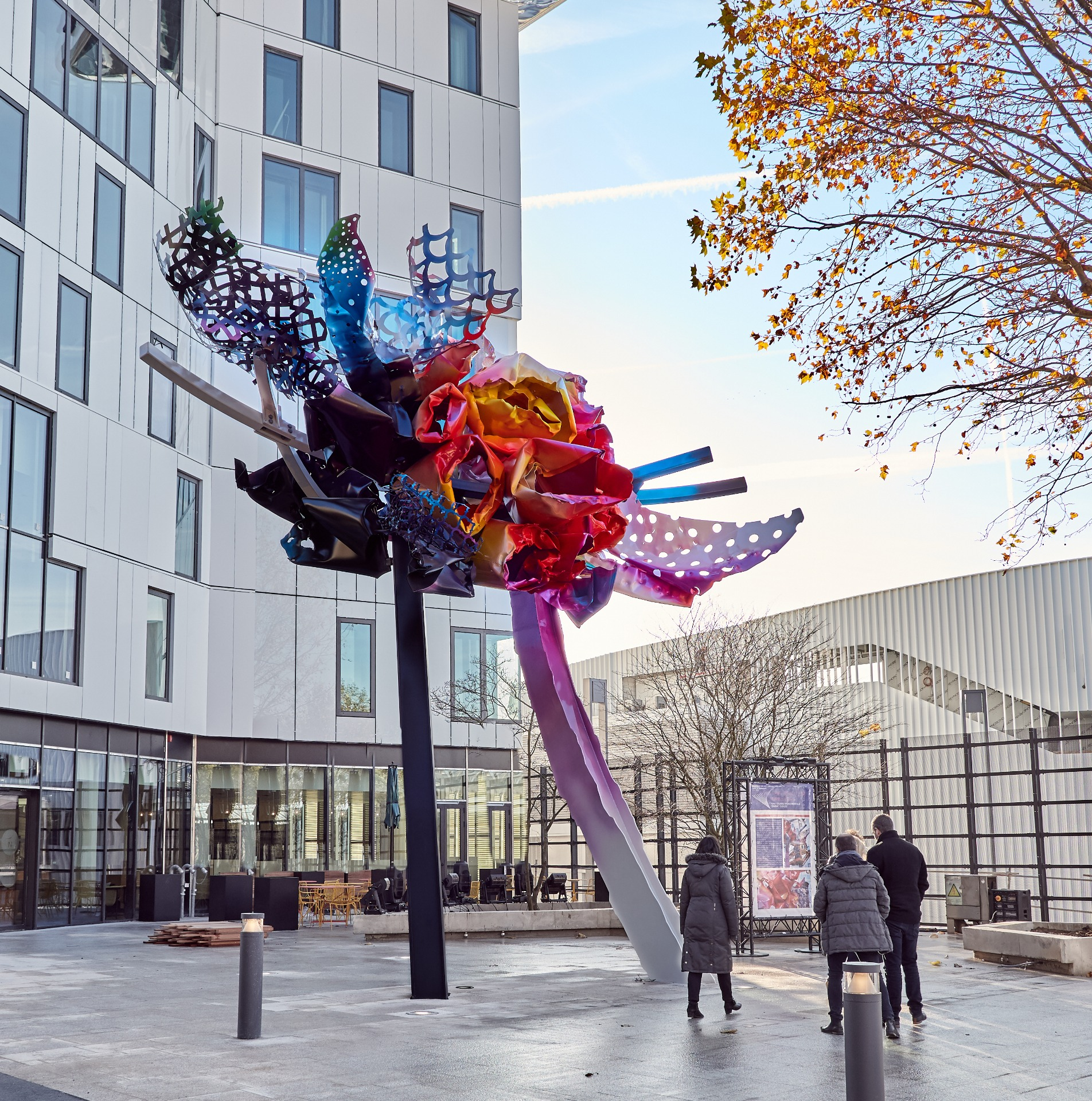
The Beautiful Dreamer by Quinze

== Personal life ==
Quinze married Barbara Becker at their Miami waterfront home on 9 September 2009. The couple divorced two years later, in October 2011. He married An Lemmens a year later, on 6 October 2012; they divorced in September 2015.

He has five children, and lives and works in Sint-Martens-Latem near Ghent, Belgium.
