= Günther Bosch =

Romanian-German tennis player and coach

Günther Bosch (born March 1, 1937, in Brașov, in German Kronstadt, Kingdom of Romania) is a Romanian-German former tennis player and current tennis coach. He was the national coach of the DTB for the youngsters and became known as the personal trainer of Boris Becker at his first Wimbledon victory in 1985.

== Biography ==
The Transylvanian Saxon Bosch played tennis in the Romanian Davis Cup team, but was only the Romanian "number three" in the shadow of Ilie Năstase and Ion Țiriac. His studies at the Sports University of Bucharest after his active career ended with his thesis "The Psychology of the Impact".

In 1974, Bosch, at the time the youth coach of the Romanian federation, withdrew after a youth tournament in Saarbrücken; his wife Rodica and daughter were only allowed to leave the country two years later.

As a national coach, he discovered the tennis talent Boris Becker during a sighting in Biberach in 1976. At the request of Becker's parents, he took over the care of Boris, who called him "Güntzi". For this position, Bosch gave up his position as national coach for German tennis offspring in 1984. At the same time, Ion Țiriac took over the position of sports manager for Becker. Together they led Boris Becker to win Wimbledon twice in a row, in 1985 and 1986.

In 1987, Boris Becker and Günther Bosch parted ways after Becker, contrary to expectations, failed in the round of 16 at the Australian Open. The German tennis star justified the separation with the words: "I need a trainer who doesn't look after me day and night."

Bosch later worked as a book author, newspaper columnist, and television commentator. In 1999, he opened the Günther Bosch Tennis Academy in Waldsiedlung.

Bosch lives in Monte Carlo and recently back in Berlin. Since autumn 2005, he has been responsible for promoting talent at LTTC Rot-Weiß Berlin ("Rot-Weiß Tennis School").

== Works ==
- "Boris", Ullstein Verlag, Frankfurt / Berlin 1986, ISBN 3-550-07976-1.
