= Barbara Becker =

German-American designer and model (born 1966)

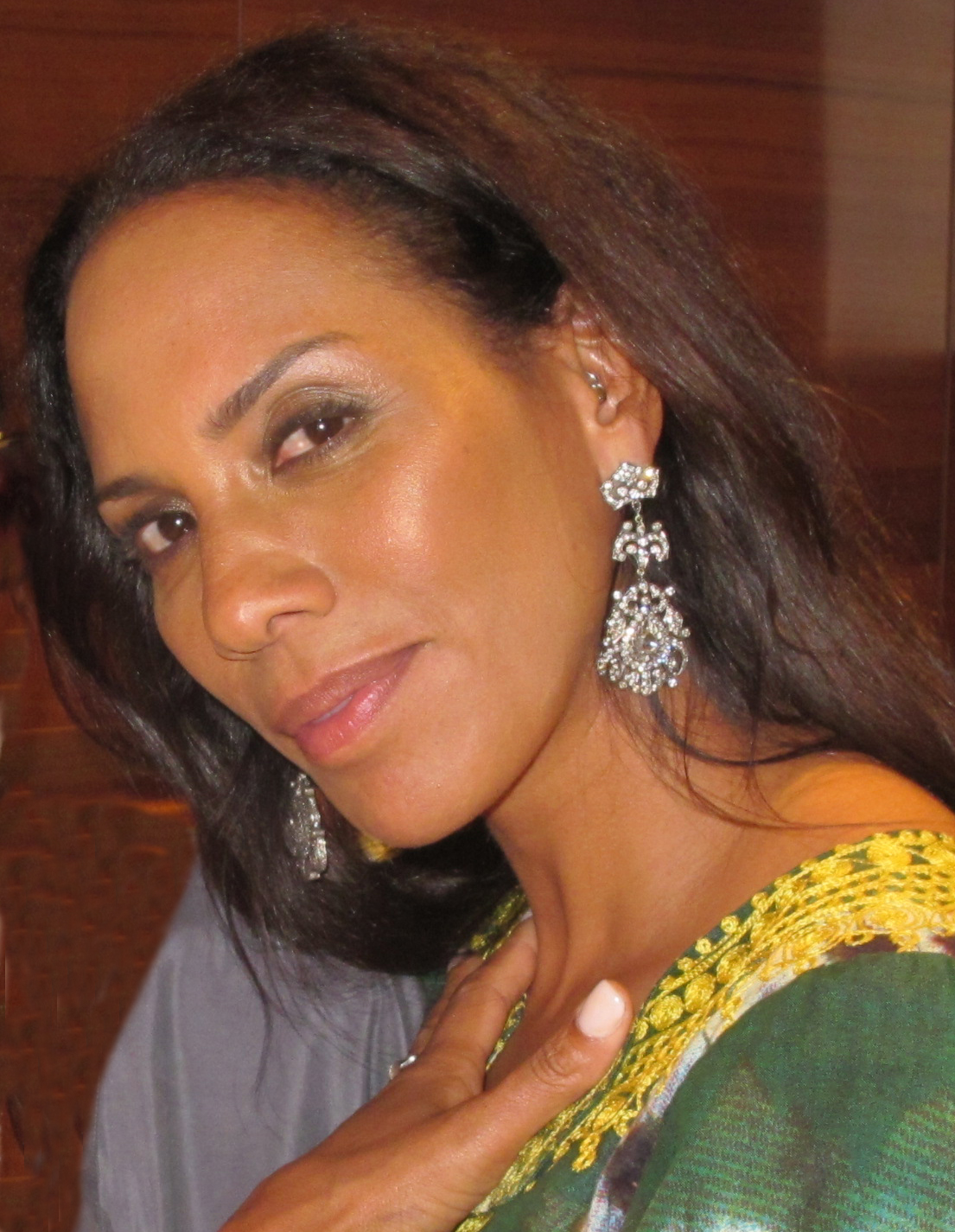
- Born: Barbara Feltus; November 1, 1966 (age 59); Heidelberg, Baden-Württemberg, West Germany
- Spouse(s): Boris Becker (1993–2001); Arne Quinze (2009–2011)
- Children: 2

Barbara Becker (nee Feltus, born November 1, 1966) is a German-American designer, former actress and model.

== Early life ==
Barbara Becker was born to a Black American father, Harlan Feltus, and a German mother, Ursula. Her father originally went to Europe as a lieutenant in the US medical corps but became a successful photographer. Her mother was a teacher.

== Personal life ==
Growing up in Germany, she studied acting and dance. Her early career included both modeling and television roles.

In the autumn of 1991, Feltus met international tennis star Boris Becker. They married in 1993. They have two sons, Noah and Elias. In 2001, their marriage ended in divorce.

Before the marriage, they shocked some in Germany by posing nude for the cover of Stern in a picture taken by her father.They had two sons Noah (born 1994) and Elias (born 1999). After Becker asked Barbara for a separation in December 2000, she flew to Miami, Florida, with Noah and Elias and filed a divorce petition in Miami-Dade County Court, after being contacted by a woman claiming to be pregnant with Becker's child. In his autobiography, Becker stated that he admitted to his wife that he had had a one-night stand with another woman while Barbara was pregnant with their second child. Becker was granted a divorce on 15 January 2001: Barbara received a $14.4 million settlement, their condominium on Fisher Island, Florida, and custody of their children.

In February 2001, Becker acknowledged paternity of a daughter, Anna Ermakova [de], with a Russian waitress at London's Nobu restaurant, Angela Ermakova, after media reported that he had a child as a result of a sexual encounter in 1999. Becker initially denied paternity, claiming he only had oral sex with Ermakova. His lawyers made allegations that Ermakova had stolen his sperm and used it to inseminate herself after the encounter. Subsequently, he reversed his stance and accepted fatherhood. Some time after that, a DNA test confirmed he was the father. In November 2007, he obtained joint custody of Anna after expressing concerns over how Ermakova was raising her.

Starting in 2006, Becker was the UNICEF ambassador for a program to prevent tetanus in developing countries. Between 2006 and 2009 more than 300 million doses of the vaccine were donated.

Becker and artist Arne Quinze announced their engagement on 6 January 2009. They married on 9 September 2009 at their home in Miami, Florida, and celebrated the wedding on 13 September 2009 in Berlin. Both events were photographed by Miami interior designer Sam Robin. Becker and Quinze divorced in 2011.

Currently, Becker lives in Miami, where she creates and promotes fitness videos in addition to designing and promoting home products.
