= Timeless Torches =

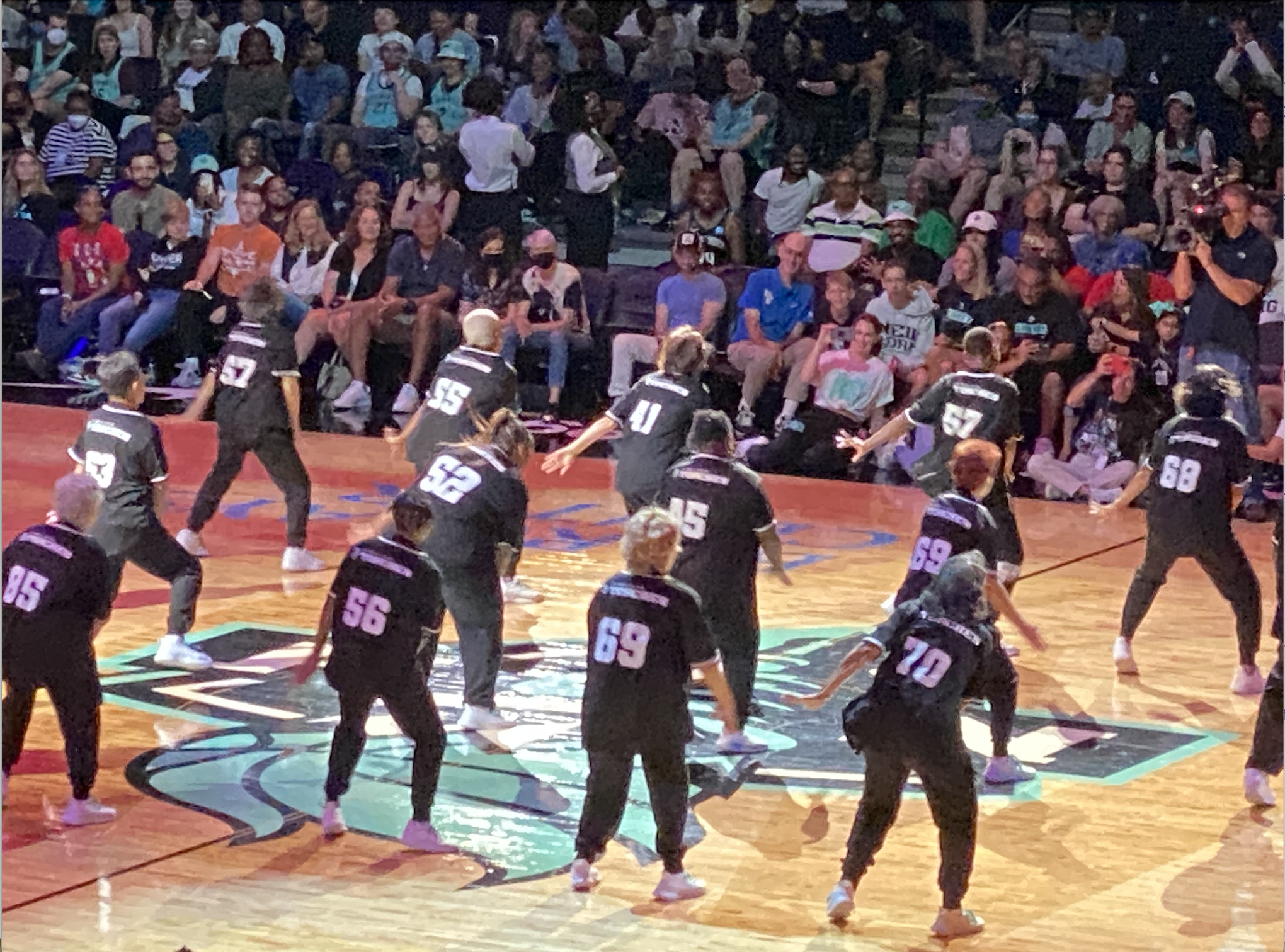
The Timeless Torches, an over-40 dance troupe, with each dancer's age inscribed on the back of their uniform, performs at a NY Liberty WNBA game in 2022.

The Timeless Torches are the senior dance squad that performs as sideline entertainment during New York Liberty Games in the WNBA.

They are a diverse group of men and women ranging in ages from 40 to 80+. The Timeless Torches dance in a wide range of styles and are one of the most well known dance acts in sports.

The mission of the Timeless Torches is to inspire and entertain.

== Origin ==
The Timeless dance troupe was founded in 2005 and holds open auditions every year.

== Notable Media Appearances ==
The Timeless Torches were featured on a 2012 episode of 30 Rock as well as Good Morning America, the Today Show and appearances at WNBA and NBA All-Star Games.
