= John McEnroe =

American former tennis player (born 1959)

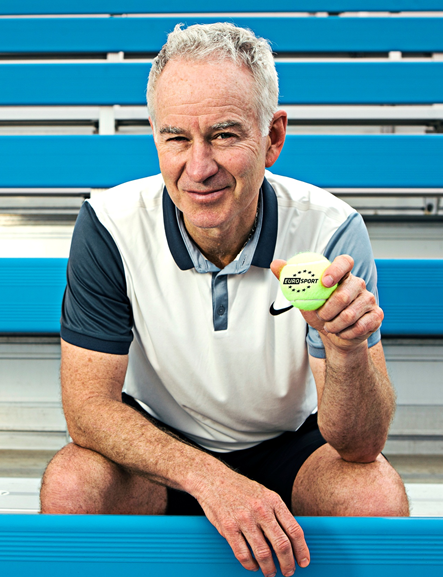
- McEnroe in 2015
- Full name: John Patrick McEnroe Jr.
- Country (sports): United States
- Residence: New York City, US
- Born: February 16, 1959 (age 67) Wiesbaden, West Germany
- Height: 5 ft 11 in (1.80 m)
- Turned pro: 1978
- Retired: 1994 (singles); 2006 (doubles)
- Plays: Left-handed (one-handed backhand)
- College: Stanford University
- Coach: Antonio Palafox
- Prize money: US$12,552,132
- Int. Tennis HoF: 1999 (member page)

Singles
- Career record: 883–198 (81.7%)
- Career titles: 77 (6th in the Open Era)
- Highest ranking: No. 1 (March 3, 1980)

Grand Slam singles results
- Australian Open: SF (1983)
- French Open: F (1984)
- Wimbledon: W (1981, 1983, 1984)
- US Open: W (1979, 1980, 1981, 1984)

Other tournaments
- Tour Finals: W (1978, 1983, 1984)
- Grand Slam Cup: QF (1992)
- WCT Finals: W (1979, 1981, 1983, 1984, 1989)

Doubles
- Career record: 530–103 (83.7%)
- Career titles: 77 (5th in the Open Era)
- Highest ranking: No. 1 (January 3, 1983)

Grand Slam doubles results
- Australian Open: SF (1989)
- French Open: QF (1992)
- Wimbledon: W (1979, 1981, 1983, 1984, 1992)
- US Open: W (1979, 1981, 1983, 1989)

Other doubles tournaments
- Tour Finals: W (1978, 1979, 1980, 1981, 1982, 1983, 1984)

Mixed doubles
- Career titles: 1

Grand Slam mixed doubles results
- French Open: W (1977)
- Wimbledon: SF (1999)

Team competitions
- Davis Cup: W (1978, 1979, 1981, 1982, 1992)
- Hopman Cup: F (1990)

John Patrick McEnroe Jr. (Note: Pronounced /ˈmækənroʊ/ MAK-ən-roh) (born February 16, 1959) is an American former professional tennis player. Often ranked amongst the greatest tennis players of all time, McEnroe was ranked as the world No. 1 in men's singles by the Association of Tennis Professionals (ATP) for 170 weeks. He also held the world No. 1 ranking in men's doubles for 269 weeks (third-most of all time). He is one of two male players (alongside Stefan Edberg) to have held both No. 1 rankings, and the only one to hold both simultaneously. McEnroe was known during his playing career for his shot-making and volleying skills, his rivalries with Björn Borg and Jimmy Connors, and his confrontational on-court behavior, which frequently landed him in trouble with umpires and tennis authorities.

McEnroe won an Open Era record 155 career titles: 77 in singles, 77 in doubles and 1 in mixed doubles. This includes seven singles majors (four at the US Open and three at Wimbledon), nine men's doubles majors, and one mixed doubles major. McEnroe is the only male player to win more than 70 titles in both singles and doubles. His singles match record of 82–3 in 1984 remains the best single-season win rate of the Open Era. McEnroe also excelled at the two year-end tournaments, winning eight singles and seven doubles titles, both of which are records. (Note: Three of McEnroe's winning singles year-end championships were at the Masters Grand Prix (now called the ATP Finals) and five were at the World Championship Tennis (WCT) Finals, an event that ended in 1989.) He was named the ATP Player of the Year and the ITF World Champion three times each: in 1981, 1983 and 1984.

McEnroe contributed to five Davis Cup titles for the United States and later was team captain. He has stayed active in retirement, often competing in senior events on the ATP Champions Tour, where he has won 25 titles. He also works as a television commentator during the majors and has had cameo roles and served as a narrator in various comedy television series.

== Early life ==
McEnroe was born in Wiesbaden, West Germany, to American parents, John Patrick McEnroe Sr. and his wife Katherine (née Tresham). His father, the son of Irish immigrants, was at the time stationed with the United States Air Force (USAF), once revealing during a press conference in Belgium that his son 'John was made in Belgium but born in Germany.' McEnroe's Irish paternal grandfather was from Ballyjamesduff in County Cavan and his grandmother was from County Westmeath.

When John was about nine months old his father was transferred back to the US, and the family relocated to Stewart Air Force Base in Newburgh, New York. After leaving the service, McEnroe's father worked as an advertising agent while attending Fordham Law School at night. In 1961 the family moved to New York City, settling in Flushing, Queens. Two years later it shifted to the nearby neighborhood of Douglaston. John has two younger brothers: Mark (born 1964) and former professional tennis player Patrick (born 1966).

McEnroe began playing tennis at the Douglaston Club when he was eight. At nine, his parents enrolled him in the Eastern Lawn Tennis Association, followed by competing in regional tournaments, then national juniors tournaments. By twelve he was ranked seventh in his age group, and joined the Port Washington Tennis Academy on Long Island, New York. McEnroe attended Trinity School in Manhattan, graduating in 1977.

== Career ==
=== 1977–1978: First years on tour ===
McEnroe began to make his mark as an 18-year-old amateur in 1977. He won both the Junior singles and mixed doubles titles at the French Open, partnering with Mary Carillo in the latter. He later progressed through the singles qualifying tournament at Wimbledon and into the main draw, where he lost in the semifinals to Jimmy Connors in four sets. It was the best performance by a male qualifier at any major, and one of the best performances by an amateur in the Open era.

After Wimbledon, McEnroe was recruited by coach Dick Gould and entered Stanford University. In 1978 he won the NCAA singles title, and he led the Stanford team to an NCAA championship. Later that year he joined the ATP tour and signed his first professional endorsement deal, with Sergio Tacchini. He again advanced to the semifinals at a major, this time the US Open, losing again to Connors. In all, McEnroe won four singles titles in 1978, including his first Masters Grand Prix, saving two match points to beat Arthur Ashe in the finals, as well as Grand Prix events at Stockholm and Wembley. His late-season success allowed him to finish as the year-end world No. 4 player.

=== 1979–1980: First Grand Slam singles titles ===
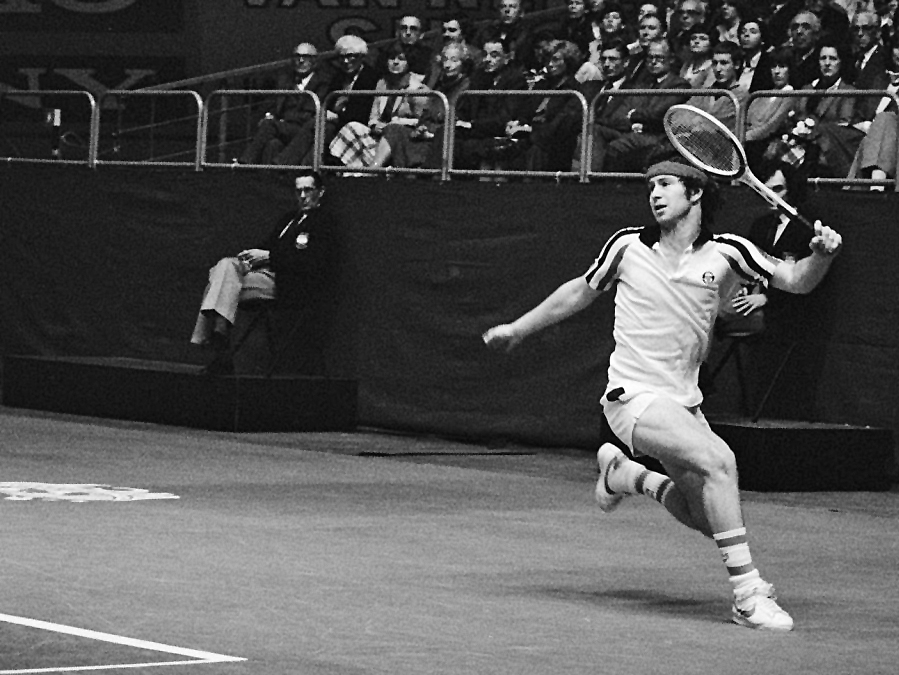
John McEnroe at the 1979 ABN Tennis Tournament

In 1979, McEnroe and partner Peter Fleming won the Wimbledon men's doubles title, followed shortly by a win in the US Open doubles. That same week, McEnroe won the singles US Open title, his first major singles title. He defeated his friend Vitas Gerulaitis in straight-sets in the final to become the youngest male winner of the singles title at the US Open since Pancho Gonzales, who was also 20 in 1948. McEnroe also won the prestigious season-ending WCT Finals, beating Björn Borg in four sets. McEnroe won 10 singles and 17 doubles titles that year for a total of 27 titles, an Open Era record, finishing at No. 3 in the year-end world singles rankings.

At Wimbledon in 1980, McEnroe reached the singles final for the first time, where he faced Björn Borg, who was seeking his fifth consecutive Wimbledon title. At the start of the final, McEnroe was booed by the crowd as he entered Centre Court, following heated exchanges with officials during his semifinal victory over Jimmy Connors. In a fourth-set tiebreaker that lasted 20 minutes, McEnroe saved five championship points en route to an 18–16 win. McEnroe, however, could not break Borg's serve in the fifth set, which he dropped 8–6. This match was voted the third greatest open era Wimbledon men's singles final in a BBC poll in 2020.

Two months later McEnroe bested Borg in the five-set final of the 1980 US Open. He was a finalist at the season-ending WCT Finals, and finished as the world No. 2 ranked player behind Borg.

=== 1981–1983: No. 1 ===
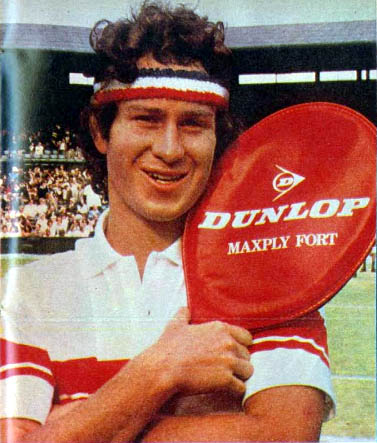
McEnroe in a Dunlop advertisement published on El Gráfico, 1981

McEnroe remained controversial when he returned to Wimbledon in 1981. Following his first-round match against Tom Gullikson, McEnroe was fined U.S. $1,500 and came close to being ejected after he called umpire Ted James "the pits of the world" and then swore at tournament referee Fred Hoyles. He also made famous the phrase "you cannot be serious", which years later became the title of his autobiography, by shouting it after several umpires' calls during his matches. This behavior was in sharp contrast to that of his then-rival Borg, who was painted by the press as an unflappable "Ice Man". However, in matches against Borg, McEnroe notably never lost his temper.

After the controversy and criticism from the British press (earning him the nickname "SuperBrat" from Ian Barnes of the Daily Express), McEnroe again reached the Wimbledon men's singles final against Borg. McEnroe prevailed in four sets, ending the Swede's run of 41 consecutive match victories at the All England Club. American TV commentator Bud Collins quipped after the match (which took place on the United States' Independence Day), paraphrasing "Yankee Doodle", "Stick a feather in his cap and call it 'McEnroe-ni'!".

In response to McEnroe's on-court outbursts during the Championships, the All England Club declined to accord McEnroe honorary club membership, an honor normally given to singles champions after their first victory. McEnroe responded by not attending the traditional champions' dinner that evening. The honor was eventually granted to McEnroe as a repeat champion.

Borg and McEnroe had their final confrontation in the final of the 1981 US Open. McEnroe won in four sets, becoming the first man since the 1920s to win three consecutive US Open singles titles. Borg never played another major. McEnroe also won his second WCT Final, beating Johan Kriek in straight sets and finished the year as the number one ranked player. He was named the Associated Press Athlete of the Year, the second men's tennis player to receive the honor after Don Budge in the 1930s.

McEnroe lost only one set going into the final of Wimbledon 1982. However, he lost to Connors in the final, despite being a tiebreak from victory at the end of the fourth set. He then lost to Ivan Lendl in straight sets in the semifinals at the US Open in a match in which Lendl was "in peak form". He was runner-up at the WCT Finals. He was able to retain the ATP's world No. 1 ranking based on points at the end of the year, having won significant events at Philadelphia, Wembley, and Tokyo; but due to Connors's victories at the two most important events of the year (Wimbledon and the US Open), Connors was named the Player of the Year by the ATP and most other tennis authorities.

In 1983, McEnroe reached his fourth consecutive Wimbledon final, dropping only one set en route, and swept aside the unheralded Chris Lewis in straight sets for his second Wimbledon crown. At the US Open, he was defeated in the fourth round, his earliest exit since 1977. He then played at the Australian Open for the first time, reaching the semifinals before being defeated in four sets by Mats Wilander. He made the WCT Final for the third time and beat Ivan Lendl in an epic five-setter. He took the Masters Grand Prix title for the second time, again beating Lendl in straight sets. He also won prized events at Philadelphia, Forest Hills, and Wembley, enabling him to capture the year-end No. 1 ranking once again.

=== 1984: best season ===
McEnroe's best season came in 1984, as he compiled an 82–3 match record that remains the highest single-season win rate of the Open Era. He won a career-best 13 singles tournaments, including Wimbledon and the US Open, capturing the year-end No. 1 ranking. He also played on the winning US World Team Cup and runner-up Davis Cup teams.

McEnroe began the year with a 42-match win streak, winning his first six tournaments and reaching his first French Open final, where his opponent was Ivan Lendl. McEnroe won the first two sets, but Lendl's adjustments of using more topspin lobs and cross-court backhand passing shots, as well as McEnroe's fatigue and temperamental outbursts, resulted in a demoralizing five-set loss. In his autobiography, McEnroe described this as his most bitter defeat and implied that he's never quite gotten over it.

He rebounded at Wimbledon, losing just one set en route to his third Wimbledon singles title. This included a straight-set rout over Jimmy Connors in the final on a very hot day. McEnroe subsequently said, "I was just thankful I played one of the best matches I have ever played. I got in a good service groove, mixing it up a lot. I had a whole range of serves. I was also good on his serve and I was hitting my forehand as well as I have in the whole tournament". He then won his fourth US Open title, defeating Lendl in straight sets in the final, after defeating Connors in a five-set semifinal late the previous evening. A tired McEnroe said after winning the final "I didn't get angry at anything. I wanted to conserve my energy". He also won his fourth WCT Final, defeating Connors in straight sets, and took his third Masters Grand Prix, beating Lendl in straight sets. His combined record against the number 2 and 3 ranked players for the year, Jimmy Connors and Ivan Lendl, respectively, was 11–1, only losing to Lendl at the French Open and going undefeated versus Connors in five matches.

The year did not end without controversy. While playing and winning the tournament in Stockholm, McEnroe had an on-court outburst that soon became notorious. After questioning a call made by the chair umpire, McEnroe demanded, "Answer my question! The question, jerk!" McEnroe then slammed his racquet into a juice cart beside the court in anger, and the stadium crowd booed him. He was suspended for 3 weeks (21 days) for exceeding a $7,500 limit on fines that had been levied due to his behavior. As a result, he was disqualified from competing in the following week's significant Wembley (London) Indoor tournament, at which he was supposed to be the number one seed, with Connors and Lendl (the eventual winner) as the second and third seeds. During his suspension, he injured his left wrist in practice, causing him to withdraw from the Australian Open.

=== 1985–1986: Fall from No. 1 & taking time off ===
In 1985, having lost in the semifinals at the French Open to Mats Wilander, McEnroe was beaten in straight sets by Kevin Curren in the quarterfinals of Wimbledon. He reached his last major singles final at the US Open; this time, he was beaten in straight sets by Lendl. He did not advance past the quarterfinals at the WCT Finals or the Masters Grand Prix. He did win important events at Philadelphia (his fourth straight there), Canada (second straight) and Stockholm (second straight and fourth overall) and finished the year as the world No. 2 ranked player.

In 1986, McEnroe took a six-month break from the tour. This meant he would miss Wimbledon. It was during this sabbatical that on August 1, 1986, he married actress Tatum O'Neal, with whom he had already had a son, Kevin (1986). They had two more children, Sean (1987) and Emily (1991), before divorcing in 1994. When McEnroe returned to the tour later in 1986, he won three ATP tournaments, but in 1987 he failed to win a title for the first time since turning professional. After losing in the first round of the French Open he withdrew from Wimbledon with an injured back just prior to the start of the tournament. This was the second consecutive year that he missed the championships at Wimbledon. He took another seven-month break from the game following the US Open, where he was suspended for two months and fined US$17,500 (equivalent to $42,480 in 2025) for misconduct and verbal abuse.

=== World No. 1 ranking ===
McEnroe became the top-ranked singles player in the world on March 3, 1980. He was the top-ranked player on 14 separate occasions between 1980 and 1985 and finished the year ranked No. 1 four straight years from 1981 through 1984. He spent a total of 170 weeks at the top of the rankings.

=== 1987–1992: Final years on tour ===
McEnroe struggled to regain his form after his 1986 sabbatical. He lost three times at majors to Ivan Lendl, losing straight-set quarterfinals at both the 1987 US Open and the 1989 Australian Open, and a long four-set match, played over two days, in the fourth round of the 1988 French Open. Rumors of drug abuse had begun during his second sabbatical. McEnroe denied them at the time, but later acknowledged he had used cocaine during his career in a 2000 interview, although he denied that the drug affected his play.

McEnroe had multiple notable victories in the final years of his career. In the 1988 French Open, McEnroe beat 16-year-old Michael Chang in straight sets in the third round; Chang went on to win the title the next year. In 1989, McEnroe won a record fifth title at the World Championship Tennis Finals (the championship tournament of the WCT tour, which was being staged for the last time), defeating top-ranked Lendl in the semifinals. At Wimbledon, he defeated Mats Wilander in a four-set quarterfinal before losing to Stefan Edberg in the semifinals. He won the RCA Championships in Indianapolis and reached the final of the Canadian Open, where he lost to Lendl. He also won both of his singles rubbers in the quarterfinal Davis Cup tie with Sweden.

Controversy was never far from McEnroe, however; in his fourth-round match against Mikael Pernfors at the 1990 Australian Open, McEnroe was ejected from the tournament for swearing at the umpire, supervisor, and referee. He was warned by the umpire for intimidating a lineswoman, and then docked a point for smashing a racket. McEnroe was apparently unaware that a new Code of Conduct, which had been introduced just before the tournament, meant that a third code violation would lead not to the deduction of a game but instead in immediate disqualification. He was also fined $6,500 for the incidents. McEnroe reached the semifinals of the US Open, losing to the eventual champion Pete Sampras in four sets. He also won the Davidoff Swiss Indoors in Basel, defeating Goran Ivanišević in a five-set final. The last time McEnroe was ranked in the world's top ten was on October 22, 1990; his end-of-year singles ranking was 13th.

In 1991, McEnroe won the last edition of the Volvo Tennis-Chicago tournament by defeating his brother Patrick in the final. He won both of his singles rubbers in the quarterfinal Davis Cup tie with Spain. He reached the fourth round at Wimbledon (losing to Edberg) and the third round at the US Open (losing to Chang in a five-set night match). His end-of-year singles ranking was No. 28.

In 1992, McEnroe defeated third-ranked and defending champion Boris Becker in the third round of the Australian Open in straight sets before a sell-out crowd. In the fourth round, McEnroe needed 4 hours 42 minutes to defeat ninth-ranked Emilio Sánchez 8–6 in the fifth set. He lost to Wayne Ferreira in the quarterfinals. At Wimbledon, McEnroe reached the semifinals where he lost in straight sets to the eventual champion Andre Agassi. McEnroe also teamed with Michael Stich to win his fifth Wimbledon men's doubles title in a record-length 5-hour-1-minute final, which the pair won 19–17 in the fifth set. At the end of the year, he teamed with Pete Sampras to win the doubles rubber in the Davis Cup final, where the U.S. defeated Switzerland 3–1. McEnroe retired at the end of 1992. He ended his singles career ranked world No. 20.

=== 1994 & 1999: Brief returns ===
McEnroe played in one singles tournament in 1994 as a wildcard at the Rotterdam Open, losing in the first round to Magnus Gustafsson. This was his last singles match on the ATP Tour. After Steffi Graf won the 1999 French Open, McEnroe suggested to her that they play mixed doubles at Wimbledon. She agreed, and they went on to reach the semifinals, but withdrew at that stage because Graf had reached the singles final, and preferred to focus on that tournament.

=== Success in doubles ===
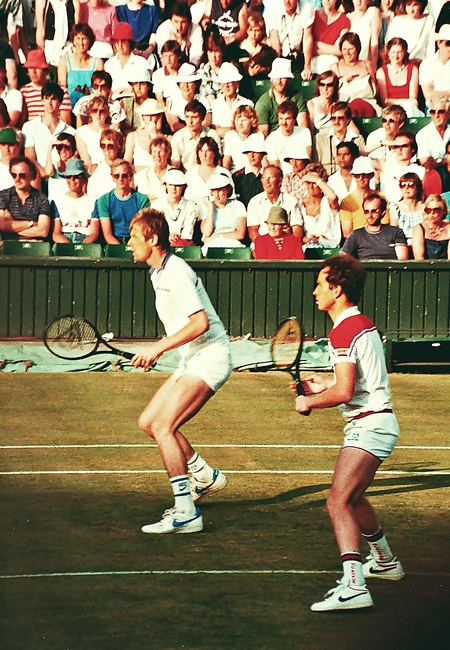
McEnroe with Peter Fleming (left) at Wimbledon, mid 1980s

In addition to his success as a singles player, McEnroe was also ranked at number 1 in doubles for a combined 270 weeks and won ten Grand Slam doubles titles. His first Grand Slam doubles title was the 1977 French Open mixed doubles with his childhood friend Mary Carillo.

His most successful partnership was with Peter Fleming, with whom he won 57 doubles titles, including seven Grand Slams (four at Wimbledon and three at the US Open). Fleming once remarked that "the best doubles partnership in the world is McEnroe and anybody."

McEnroe won a fourth US Open men's doubles title in 1989 with Mark Woodforde, and a fifth Wimbledon men's doubles title in 1992 with Michael Stich.

McEnroe's success led to some writing that he might have been "the greatest doubles player of all time" and "possibly the greatest team player never to have played a team sport."

=== Davis Cup ===
More than any other player in his era, McEnroe was responsible for reviving American interest in the Davis Cup, which had been shunned by Jimmy Connors and other leading U.S. players, and had not seen a top U.S. player regularly compete since Arthur Ashe. In 1978, McEnroe won two singles rubbers in the final as the U.S. captured the Cup for the first time since 1972, defeating Great Britain in the final. McEnroe continued to be a mainstay of U.S. Davis Cup teams for the next 14 years, and was part of title-winning teams in 1978, 1979, 1981, 1982, and 1992. He set numerous U.S. Davis Cup records, including years played (12), ties (30), singles wins (41), and total wins in singles and doubles (59). He played both singles and doubles in 13 series, and he and Peter Fleming won 14 of 15 Davis Cup doubles matches together.

An epic performance was McEnroe's 6-hour, 22-minute victory over Mats Wilander in the deciding rubber of the quarterfinal win over Sweden in 1982, played in St. Louis, Missouri. McEnroe won the match, at the time the longest in Davis Cup history, 9–7, 6–2, 15–17, 3–6, 8–6. McEnroe nearly broke that record in a 6-hour, 20-minute Davis Cup loss to Boris Becker five years later. Becker won that match, the second rubber in a 3–2 loss to West Germany in World Group Relegation play, 4–6, 15–13, 8–10, 6–2, 6–2.

McEnroe also helped the U.S. win the World Team Cup in 1984 and 1985, in both cases defeating Czechoslovakia in the final.

=== Post-retirement from tennis ===
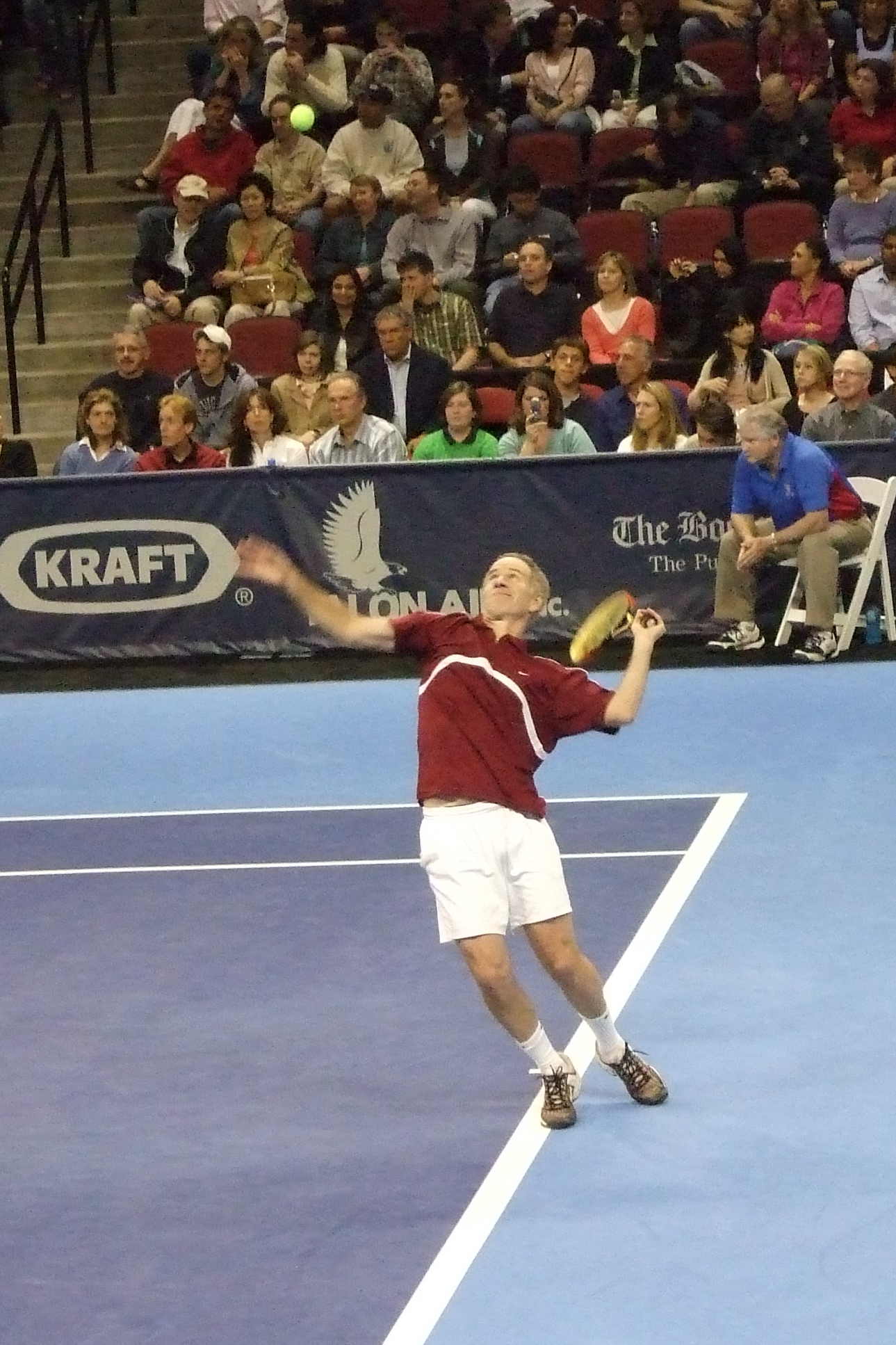
John McEnroe serving during a Champions Cup Boston match, 2007

After retiring, McEnroe pursued his post-tour goal of becoming a working musician. He had learned to play guitar with the help of friends like Eddie Van Halen and Eric Clapton. During his divorce, McEnroe formed The Johnny Smyth Band with himself as lead singer and guitarist, began writing songs, and played small gigs in cities where he played with the senior tour. Although Lars Ulrich complimented his "natural instinct for music", a bar owner where McEnroe's band played said that "he couldn't sing to save his life." The band toured for two years, but McEnroe suddenly quit in 1997 just before finishing his first album. In 1997, McEnroe's wife, singer-songwriter Patty Smyth, told him, "In future only one of us will be working away from home on a music tour and it ain't gonna be you!"

McEnroe was inducted into the International Tennis Hall of Fame in 1999. He is now a sports commentator providing commentary for American television networks such as ESPN, CBS, NBC, and USA at the US Open, the Australian Open, and various ATP tournaments, as well as at Wimbledon for the BBC in the UK.

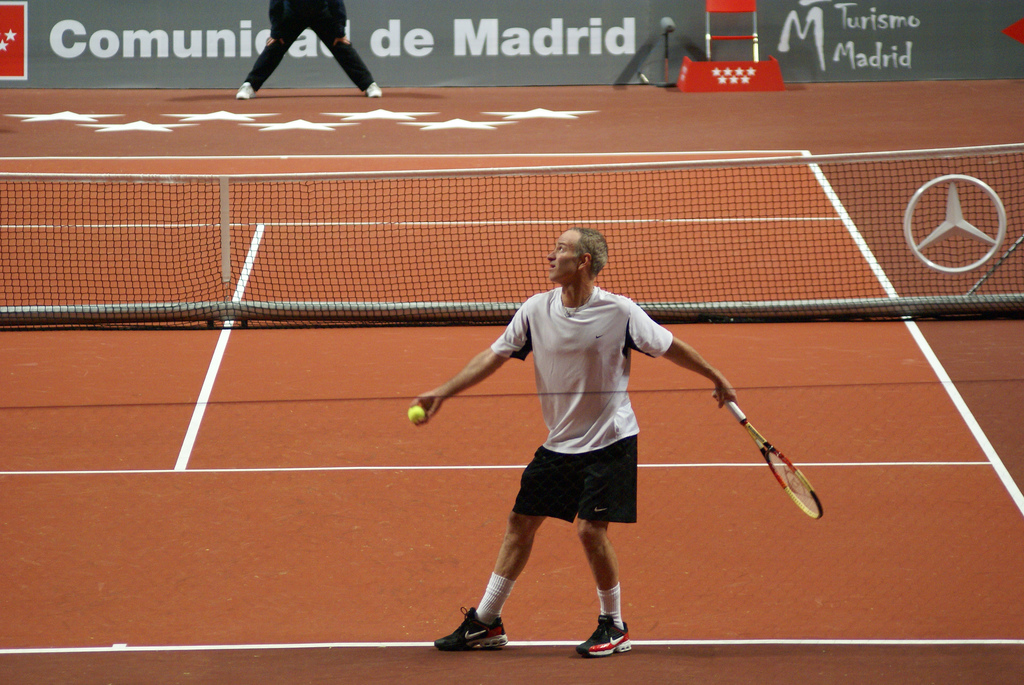
John McEnroe in the 2007 Madrid Masters Senior

McEnroe became the U.S. Davis Cup captain in September 1999. His team barely escaped defeat in their first two outings in 2000, beating Zimbabwe and the Czech Republic in tight 3–2 encounters. They were then defeated 5–0 by Spain in the semifinals. McEnroe resigned in November 2000 after 14 months as captain, citing frustration with the Davis Cup schedule and format as two of his primary reasons. His brother Patrick took over the job.

In 2002, McEnroe played himself in Mr. Deeds and again in 2008 in You Don't Mess with the Zohan. McEnroe played himself in the 2004 movie Wimbledon. In July 2004, McEnroe began a CNBC talk show titled McEnroe. The show, however, was unsuccessful and was canceled within five months. In 2002, he hosted the American game show The Chair on ABC as well as the British version on BBC One, but this venture also was unsuccessful.

In 2004, McEnroe said that during much of his career he had unwittingly taken steroids. He said that he had been administered these drugs without his knowledge, stating: "For six years I was unaware I was being given a form of steroid of the legal kind they used to give horses until they decided it was too strong even for horses."

McEnroe is active in philanthropy and tennis development. For years he has co-chaired the City Parks Foundation's annual CityParks Tennis fundraiser. The charitable benefit raises crucial funds for New York City's largest municipal youth tennis programs. He collects American contemporary art, and opened a gallery in Manhattan in 1993.

McEnroe still plays regularly on the ATP Champions Tour. One victory came at the Jean-Luc Lagardere Trophy in Paris in 2010, where he defeated Guy Forget in the final. Playing on the Champions Tour allows him to continue his most iconic rivalries with old adversaries Ivan Lendl and Björn Borg. His last and 26th win (a record since 2001 when the ATP acquired the Champions Tour) was his 2016 win at Stockholm against Thomas Muster.

In charity events and World Team Tennis, he has beaten many top players, including Mardy Fish and Mark Philippoussis.

In 2007, McEnroe received the Philippe Chatrier Award (the ITF's highest accolade) for his contributions to tennis both on and off the court. Later that year, he also appeared on the NBC comedy 30 Rock as the host of a game show called "Gold Case" in which he uttered his famous line "You cannot be serious!" when a taping went awry. McEnroe also appeared on the HBO comedy Curb Your Enthusiasm.

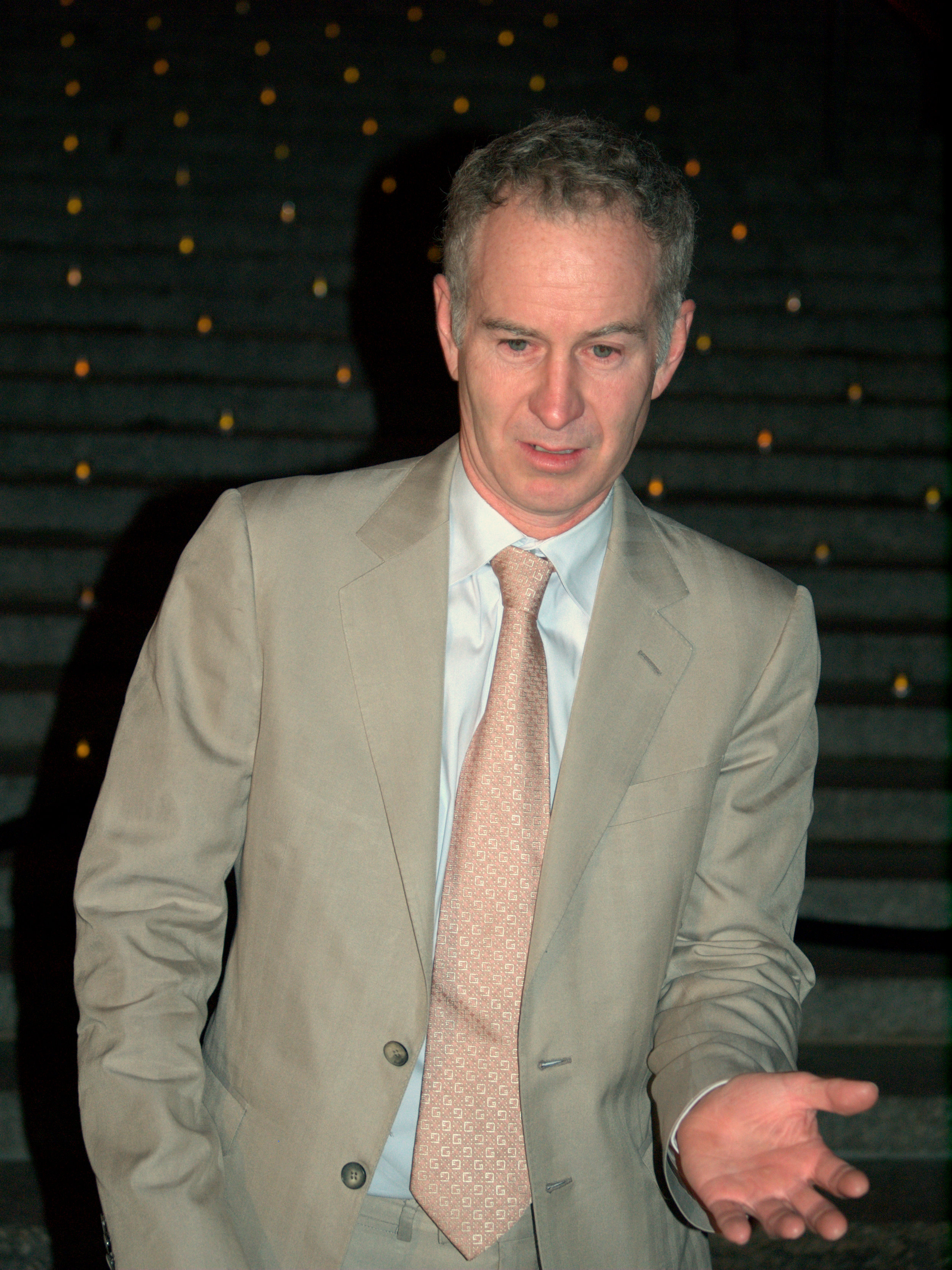
McEnroe demonstrating his swing at a Vanity Fair party in New York City, 2009

In 2010, he founded the John McEnroe Tennis Academy on Randall's Island in New York City.

In 2012, McEnroe, commentating for ESPN, heavily criticized Australian tennis player Bernard Tomic for "tanking" against Andy Roddick at the US Open. However, Tomic was cleared of any wrongdoing, saying that he was "simply overwhelmed by the occasion" (this was the first time that he had played at Arthur Ashe Stadium).

McEnroe was part of Milos Raonic's coaching team from May to August 2016.

In addition to his other commentary roles, McEnroe was a central figure for Australian television network Nine's coverage of the 2019/2020 Australian Open.

McEnroe performed as the off-camera narrator for four seasons (2020–2023) of Never Have I Ever, appearing in one episode in Season 1.

On April 2, 2023, McEnroe participated with Michael Chang, Andre Agassi, and Andy Roddick in the first live airing of Pickleball on ESPN in the Million dollar Pickleball Slam at the Hard Rock Casino in Hollywood, Florida.

=== Return to the tour ===
McEnroe returned to the ATP Tour in 2006 to play two doubles tournaments. In his first tournament, he teamed with Jonas Björkman to win the title at the SAP Open in San Jose. This was McEnroe's 78th doubles title (No. 5 in history) and his first title since capturing the Paris Indoor doubles title in November 1992 with his brother Patrick. The win meant that McEnroe had won doubles titles in four different decades.

In his second tournament, McEnroe and Björkman lost in the quarterfinals of the tournament in Stockholm.

McEnroe won the over-45 legends doubles competition at the French Open in 2012. He was partnered with his brother Patrick. They beat Guy Forget and Henri Leconte 7–6, 6–3. McEnroe and his brother Patrick won again at the 2014 French Open in the over-45 legends doubles competition. They beat Andres Gomez and Mark Woodforde 4–6, 7–5, 1–0 (10–7).

== Personal life ==
McEnroe was married to Tatum O'Neal from 1986 to 1994. They have three children. After their divorce, they were awarded joint custody of the children, but in 1998 McEnroe was awarded sole custody due to O'Neal's addiction to heroin.

In 1997, McEnroe married rock singer Patty Smyth, with whom he has two daughters. They live on Manhattan's Upper West Side.

McEnroe has published two autobiographies: You Cannot Be Serious (released as Serious in the UK) in 2002, and But Seriously in 2017.

== Career statistics ==
=== Singles performance timeline ===
Key
W	F	SF	QF	#R	RR	Q#	P#	DNQ	A	Z#	PO	G	S	B	NMS	NTI	P	NH

(W) winner; (F) finalist; (SF) semifinalist; (QF) quarterfinalist; (#R) rounds 4, 3, 2, 1; (RR) round-robin stage; (Q#) qualification round; (P#) preliminary round; (DNQ) did not qualify; (A) absent; (Z#) Davis/Fed Cup Zonal Group (with number indication) or (PO) play-off; (G) gold, (S) silver or (B) bronze Olympic/Paralympic medal; (NMS) not a Masters tournament; (NTI) not a Tier I tournament; (P) postponed; (NH) not held; (SR) strike rate (events won / competed); (W–L) win–loss record.

Tournament	1977	1978	1979	1980	1981	1982	1983	1984	1985	1986	1987	1988	1989	1990	1991	1992	SR	W–L	Win %
Grand Slam tournaments
Australian Open	A	A	A	A	A	A	SF	A	QF	NH	A	A	QF	4R	A	QF	0 / 5	18–5	78.26
French Open	2R	A	A	3R	QF	A	QF	F	SF	A	1R	4R	A	A	1R	1R	0 / 10	25–10	71.43
Wimbledon	SF	1R	4R	F	W	F	W	W	QF	A	A	2R	SF	1R	4R	SF	3 / 14	59–11	84.29
US Open	4R	SF	W	W	W	SF	4R	W	F	1R	QF	2R	2R	SF	3R	4R	4 / 16	65–12	84.42
Win–loss	9–3	5–2	9–1	15–2	18–1	11–2	18–3	20–1	18–4	0–1	4–2	5–3	10–3	8–3	5–3	12–4	7 / 45	167–38	81.55
Year End Championships
The Masters		W	SF	RR	SF	F	W	W	1R				SF				3 / 9	19–11	63.33
WCT Finals			W	F	W	F	W	W	QF		F		W				5 / 9	21–4	84.00
Win–loss		5–0	5–2	2–4	5–2	4–2	6–0	6–0	0–2		2–1		5–2				8 / 18	40–15	72.73
Year End Ranking	21	4	3	2	1	1	1	1	2	14	10	11	4	13	28	20	$12,552,132		

=== Records ===
- These records were attained in the Open Era of tennis.

Championship	Years	Record accomplished	Player tied
Grand Slam	1984	89.9% (62–7) sets winning percentage in 1 season	Stands alone
Grand Slam	1984	11 consecutive match victories without losing a set	Roger Federer; Rafael Nadal
Wimbledon	1979–1992	8 singles and doubles titles combined	Stands alone
Wimbledon	1984	68% (134–63) games winning % in 1 tournament	Stands alone
US Open	1979–1989	8 singles and doubles titles	Stands alone

Time span	Other selected records	Players matched
GP/WCT Finals records
1980–1988	12 combined WCT and GP finals overall	Ivan Lendl
1979–1988	18 combined WCT and GP finals appearances overall	Ivan Lendl
1979–1988	8 combined WCT and GP titles overall	Stands alone
1981–1984	3 combined WCT and GP titles won without losing a set	Ivan Lendl
1979–1985	5 WCT titles overall	Stands alone
1983–1984	2 consecutive WCT titles	Ken Rosewall
1979–1989	8 WCT finals overall	Stands alone
1979–1984	6 consecutive WCT finals	Stands alone
1979–1984	21 match wins in WCT tour finals	Stands alone
1978–84	7 Masters Grand Prix doubles titles consecutive and overall	Peter Fleming
1978–84	7 Masters Grand Prix doubles titles consecutive and overall as a team	Peter Fleming
Other records
1978–2006	156 total titles (77 singles, 78 doubles and 1 mixed)	Stands alone
1979	27 titles (10 singles & 17 doubles) in same season	Stands alone
1979	17 doubles titles in same season	Stands alone
1984	96.47% (82–3) single season match winning percentage	Stands alone
1982	Carpet Triple (London, Philadelphia and Tokyo)	Stands alone
1984	Hard Triple (Forest Hills, Toronto and Stockholm)	Stands alone
1978–1985	10 carpet court Grand Prix Championship Series titles	Stands alone
1978–1983	5 Wembley titles overall	Stands alone
1978–1985	4 Stockholm Open titles overall	Boris Becker
1982–1985	4 U.S. Pro Indoor titles overall	Jimmy Connors; Rod Laver; Pete Sampras
1983–1984	9 consecutive hard court titles	Ivan Lendl
1983–1985	13 consecutive carpet court titles	Stands alone
1983–1985	15 consecutive indoor court titles	Stands alone
1983–1985	66 consecutive carpet court match victories	Stands alone
1979	56 carpet court match wins in a season	Stands alone
1978–1991	84.29% (349–65) carpet court match winning percentage	Stands alone
1978–1991	85.28% (423–73) indoor court match winning percentage	Stands alone
1984	49 consecutive sets on carpet won	Stands alone
1984	Achieved No. 1 ranking in both singles and doubles simultaneously	Stands alone
1978–1992	Achieved No. 1 ranking in both singles and doubles	Stefan Edberg
1980–1985	Regained No. 1 ranking 14 times	Stands alone
1984	42 consecutive matches won from the start of the season	Stands alone
1979	15 doubles titles in 1 season as a team	Peter Fleming

== Legacy ==
McEnroe's achievements have led many to consider him among the greatest tennis players in history. (Note: See. Also, Tennis magazine ranked McEnroe the sixth best male player of the period 1965–2005.)

=== Professional awards ===
- Associated Press Athlete of the Year: 1981
- ITF World Champion:1981, 1983, 1984
- ATP player of the year: 1981, 1983, 1984
- ATP most improved player: 1978
- World Number 1 Male Player
- Davis Cup Commitment Award
- Chevalier of the Legion of Honour 2024

== In popular culture ==
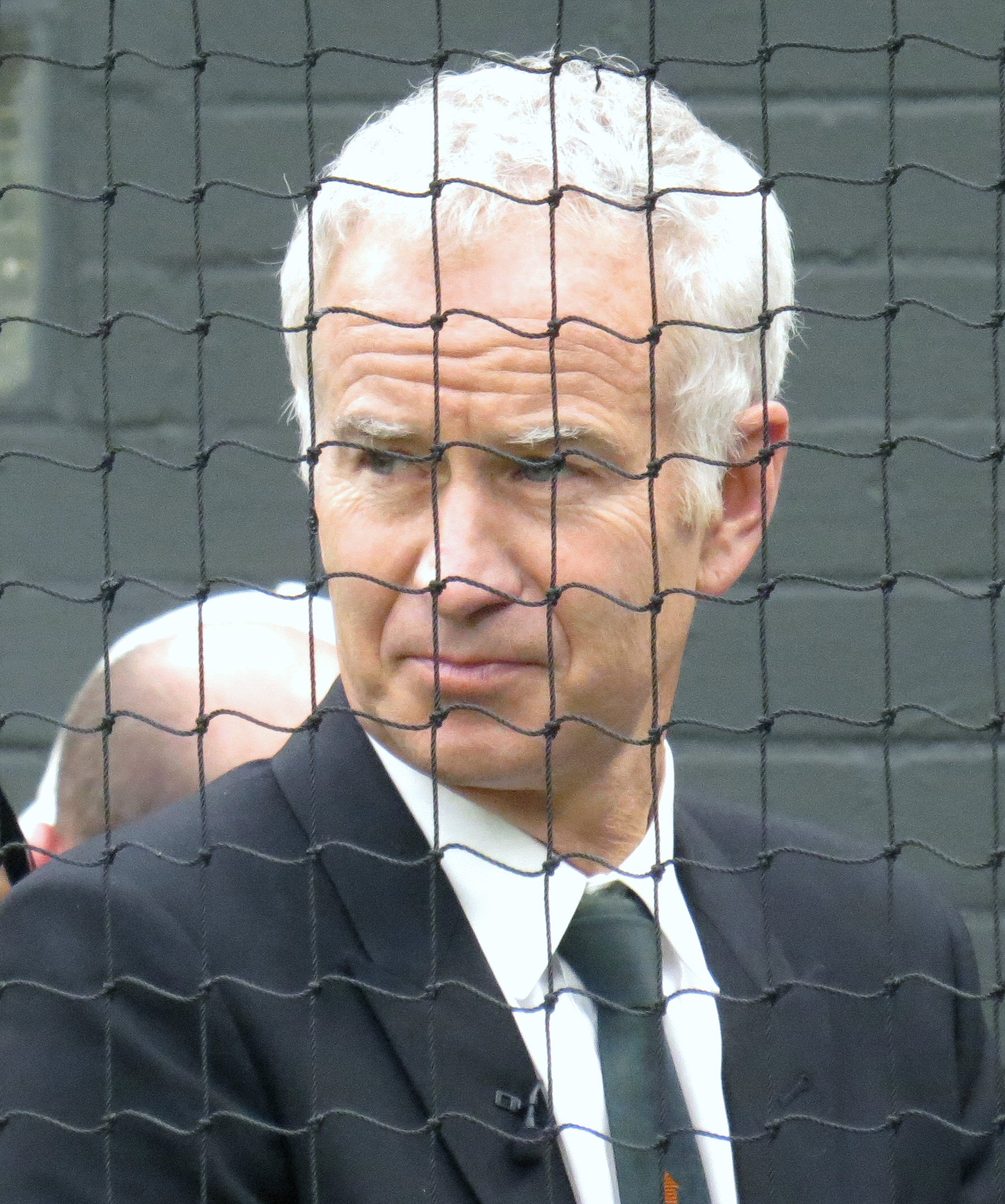
John McEnroe at Wimbledon 2014

McEnroe's fiery temper has led to him being parodied in popular culture:

- In 1982, British impressionist Roger Kitter and Kaplan Kaye, under the name of "The Brat", recorded the single "Chalk Dust - The Umpire Strikes Back" in which Kitter parodied McEnroe losing his temper during a match. The single reached the UK Top 20 and was a Top 10 hit in the Netherlands, Belgium and South Africa.
- His bursts of rage were parodied in the satirical British programme Spitting Image, on which he and wife Tatum frequently screamed and threw things at each other.
- Another parody was in the satirical British programme Not the Nine O'Clock News, portrayed by Griff Rhys Jones, showing him arguing with his parents over breakfast.
- He mocked himself in a PETA ad promoting spay and neuter, by launching into one of his famous tirades when challenged about his decision to have his dog fixed.
- In the 1980s he appeared in a commercial for R. White's Lemonade in the UK.
- In 2006, McEnroe appeared in a television advert campaign for National Car Rental, expressing one of his outbursts, saying "Any Car? You cannot be serious!" The following year, McEnroe appeared in an advertisement for Telstra in Australia.
- In late 2013, he starred in a television commercial campaign for the UK based gadget insurance company Protect Your Bubble. In the TV adverts, he emulated his on-court outbursts.
- In 2014 he appeared as a guitarist on the solo debut album of Chrissie Hynde, lead singer of The Pretenders.
- McEnroe was portrayed by Shia LaBeouf in the Swedish biopic Borg vs McEnroe, which was released in 2017 depicting their rivalry and in particular the 1980 Wimbledon final.
- In the Homestar Runner Halloween cartoon "3 Times Halloween Funjob", Homestar Runner dresses up as McEnroe, and in an Easter egg at the end of the cartoon, a puppet version of Homestar quotes McEnroe's Wimbledon tirade.
- In his guest cameo appearance in season four of Only Murders in the Building had Oliver Putnam (played by Martin Short) accidentally bump into McEnroe and angering him, threatening Putnam in the city streets.

=== Film and television appearances ===
Year	Production	Role	Notes
1979	Players	Himself	
1996	Arliss	Himself	Episode: "Crossing the Line"
1997	Suddenly Susan	Himself	Episode: "I'll See That and Raise You Susan"
1998	Frasier	Patrick (radio show caller)	Episode: "Sweet Dreams"
1998	Hey Hey It's Saturday	Himself	Episode 35: Red Faces segment guest judge
2002	The Chair	Himself	Hosted for 13 episodes
2002	Mr. Deeds	Himself	
2003	Anger Management	Himself	
2003	Saturday Night Live	Himself	Episode 552, broadcast November 8
2004	Wimbledon	Himself/commentator	Episode: "Adjusted Growth"
2005	Kathy Griffin: My Life on the D-List	Himself	Episode: "Adjusted Growth"
2006	Parkinson	Himself	broadcast December 16
2007	30 Rock	Himself	Episode: "The Head and the Hair"
2007	WFAN Breakfast Show	Himself	Co-hosted with brother Patrick on May 8 and 9
2007	CSI: NY	Himself/Jimmy Nelson	Episode: "Comes Around"
2007	Curb Your Enthusiasm	Himself	Episode: "The Freak Book"
2008	30 Rock	Himself	Episode: "Gavin Volure"
2008	You Don't Mess with the Zohan	Himself	
2009	Penn & Teller: Bullshit!	Himself	"Stress"
2010	Saturday Night Live	Uncredited	Episode 692, broadcast December 18
2010	The Lonely Island	Himself	"I Just Had Sex"
2011	Jack and Jill	Himself	Golden Raspberry Award for Worst Screen Ensemble (shared with the entire cast)
2011	Fire and Ice	Himself	McEnroe/Borg documentary
2012	30 Rock	Himself	Episode: "Dance Like Nobody's Watching"
2012	Saturday Night Live	Himself	Episode 719, broadcast March 10
2013	30 Rock	Himself	Episode: "Game Over"
2013	Ground Floor	Himself	Episode: If I Were A Rich Man
2015	7 Days in Hell	Himself	Television movie
2017	Saturday Night Live	Himself	Episode 836, broadcast December 2
2018	Realm of Perfection	Himself	Documentary by Julien Faraut
2020–2023	Never Have I Ever	Himself (Narrator)	TV series; 38 episodes
2024	Only Murders in the Building	City bystander	Episode: Adaptation; cameo appearance
2026	The Dink	Himself	

== See also ==
- World number 1 male tennis player rankings
- Tennis male players statistics
- List of Grand Slam men's singles champions
- Bay Area Sports Hall of Fame
- Borg–McEnroe rivalry
- Lendl–McEnroe rivalry
- Connors–McEnroe rivalry
- Tennis records of All Time – Men's singles
- Tennis records of the Open Era – Men's singles

== Video ==
- The Wimbledon Collection – Legends of Wimbledon – John McEnroe Standing Room Only, DVD Release Date: September 21, 2004, Run Time: 52 minutes, ASIN: B0002HOD9U
- The Wimbledon Collection – The Classic Match – Borg vs. McEnroe 1981 Final Standing Room Only, DVD Release Date: September 21, 2004, Run Time: 210 minutes, ASIN: B0002HODAE
- The Wimbledon Collection – The Classic Match – Borg vs. McEnroe 1980 Final Standing Room Only, DVD Release Date: September 21, 2004, Run Time: 240 minutes; ASIN: B0002HOEK8
- Charlie Rose with John McEnroe (February 4, 1999) Charlie Rose, DVD Release Date: September 18, 2006, ASIN: B000IU3342

Sporting positions
Preceded by Björn Borg; Björn Borg; Björn Borg; Björn Borg; Jimmy Connors; Jimmy Connors; Jimmy Connors; Jimmy Connors; Jimmy Connors; Ivan Lendl; Ivan Lendl; Ivan Lendl; Ivan Lendl; Ivan Lendl	World No. 1 March 3, 1980 - March 23, 1980; August 11, 1980 - August 17, 1980; July 6, 1981 - July 19, 1981; August 3, 1981 - September 12, 1982; November 1, 1982 - November 7, 1982; November 15, 1982 - January 30, 1983; February 7, 1983 - February 13, 1983; June 6, 1983 - June 12, 1983; July 4, 1983 - October 30, 1983; December 12, 1983 - January 8, 1984; March 12, 1984 - June 10, 1984; June 18, 1984 - July 8, 1984; August 13, 1984 - August 18, 1985; August 26, 1985 - September 8, 1985	Succeeded by Björn Borg; Björn Borg; Björn Borg; Jimmy Connors; Jimmy Connors; Jimmy Connors; Jimmy Connors; Jimmy Connors; Ivan Lendl; Ivan Lendl; Ivan Lendl; Ivan Lendl; Ivan Lendl; Ivan Lendl
Preceded by Björn Borg; Jimmy Connors	ITF World Champion; 1981; 1983-1984	Succeeded by Jimmy Connors; Ivan Lendl
Preceded by First season Petr Korda	ATP Champions Tour; Year-End No.1; 1998-2001; 2003	Succeeded by Petr Korda; Jim Courier
Awards and achievements
Preceded by Brian Gottfried	ATP Most Improved Player; 1978	Succeeded by Víctor Pecci
Preceded by U.S. Olympic hockey team	Associated Press Male Athlete of the Year; 1981	Succeeded by Wayne Gretzky
Preceded by Alan Hansen	RTS Television Sport Awards; Best Sports Pundit; 2001	Succeeded by Simon Hughes
