= 1984 Volvo Masters – Singles =

Singles
- 1984 Volvo Masters

Final
- Champion: (United States) John McEnroe
- Runner-up: (Czechoslovakia) Ivan Lendl
- Score: 7–5, 6–0, 6–4

Details
- Draw: 12

Events
Singles	Doubles
← 1983 ·	ATP Finals	· 1985 →

Defending champion John McEnroe defeated Ivan Lendl in a rematch of the previous year's final, 7–5, 6–0, 6–4 to win the singles title at the 1984 Volvo Masters.

== Draw ==
=== Key ===
- Q = Qualifier
- WC = Wild card
- LL = Lucky loser
- Alt = Alternate
- SE = Special exempt
- PR = Protected ranking
- ITF = ITF entry
- JE = Junior exempt
- w/o = Walkover
- r = Retired
- d = Defaulted
- SR = Special ranking

=== Finals ===
Quarter-finals
(Sweden) Henrik Sundström	4	1
(Sweden) Anders Järryd	6	6
(United States) Aaron Krickstein	5	3
(United States) Johan Kriek	7	6

Semi-finals
1	(United States) John McEnroe	2	6	6
(Sweden) Anders Järryd	6	4	2
4	(Sweden) Mats Wilander	4	6	6
(United States) Johan Kriek	6	3	4

Finals
1	(United States) John McEnroe	6	6
4	(Sweden) Mats Wilander	1	1
Finals
1	(Czechoslovakia) Ivan Lendl	7	6	6
3	(United States) Jimmy Connors	5	0	5

== See also ==
- ATP World Tour Finals appearances
