= You Cannot Be Serious =

2002 biography by John McEnroe

- Author: John McEnroe, James Kaplan
- Publisher: G.P. Putnam's Sons
- Publication date: 2002
- ISBN: 0-425-19008-0

You Cannot Be Serious (ISBN 0-425-19008-0 in the US, Serious ISBN 0-7515-3454-4 in the UK) is a book written by professional tennis player John McEnroe, with James Kaplan.

McEnroe details life behind the scenes on the tennis tour and provides the reader with a very candid look at his personal life and struggles. The book made it to the top of the New York Times bestseller list. The hardcover edition was published by G.P. Putnam's Sons in 2002, with the paperback being released a year later by The Berkley Publishing Group in the U.S., and by Time Warner in the UK. The name of the book comes from McEnroe's famous outburst "You cannot be serious!" during his first round match against Tom Gullikson at the 1981 Wimbledon Championships.
