= 1983 Volvo Masters – Singles =

Singles
- 1983 Volvo Masters

Final
- Champion: (United States) John McEnroe
- Runner-up: (Czechoslovakia) Ivan Lendl
- Score: 6–3, 6–4, 6–4

Details
- Draw: 12

Events
| Singles | Doubles |
| ← 1982 · | ATP Finals | · 1984 → |

John McEnroe defeated the two-time defending champion Ivan Lendl in a rematch of the previous year's final, 6–3, 6–4, 6–4 to win the singles title at the 1983 Volvo Masters.

== Draw ==
=== Key ===
- Q = Qualifier
- WC = Wild card
- LL = Lucky loser
- Alt = Alternate
- SE = Special exempt
- PR = Protected ranking
- ITF = ITF entry
- JE = Junior exempt
- w/o = Walkover
- r = Retired
- d = Defaulted
- SR = Special ranking

=== Finals ===
Quarter-finals
7 | (Spain) José Higueras | 6 | 6
9 | (Argentina) José Luis Clerc | 2 | 3
6 | (United States) Jimmy Arias | 6 | 4
12 | (United States) Johan Kriek | 7 | 6

Semi-finals
1 | (Sweden) Mats Wilander | 7 | 6
7 | (Spain) José Higueras | 6 | 2
3 | (United States) John McEnroe | 6 | 6
12 | (United States) Johan Kriek | 4 | 2

Finals
1 | (Sweden) Mats Wilander | 2 | 4
3 | (United States) John McEnroe | 6 | 6
Finals
3 | (United States) Jimmy Connors | 3 | 4 | 6
2 | (Czechoslovakia) Ivan Lendl | 6 | 4

== See also ==
- ATP World Tour Finals appearances
