= Idiots Are People Two! =

- 30 Rock episode
- Episode no.: Season 6 Episode 2
- Directed by: Beth McCarthy-Miller
- Written by: Robert Carlock
- Production code: 602
- Original air date: January 19, 2012

Guest appearances
- James Marsden as Criss; Kelsey Grammer as himself; Denise Richards as herself; Ann Curry as herself

Episode chronology
| ← Previous "Dance Like Nobody's Watching" | Next → "Idiots Are People Three!" |
- 30 Rock season 6

"Idiots Are People Two!" is the second episode of the sixth season of the American television comedy series 30 Rock, and the 105th overall episode of the series. It was directed by Beth McCarthy-Miller, and written by co-show runner and executive producer Robert Carlock. The episode originally aired on NBC in the United States on January 19, 2012. Guest stars in this episode include James Marsden, Kelsey Grammer, and Denise Richards.

In the episode, Tracy Jordan (Tracy Morgan) calls upon the world's idiots for a protest; Liz Lemon (Tina Fey) tries to get Jack Donaghy (Alec Baldwin) out of her head after he starts judging her boyfriend Criss (James Marsden); and Jenna Maroney (Jane Krakowski) and Kenneth Parcell (Jack McBrayer) injure Pete Hornberger (Scott Adsit), calling on Kelsey Grammer to help them.

== Plot ==
Jack Donaghy (Alec Baldwin) lets Liz Lemon (Tina Fey) know that he knows she has a boyfriend. Liz is hesitant to let Jack into her love life, as he always judges her boyfriends. Sure enough, when Liz is with her new boyfriend, Criss, she imagines Jack criticizing all the little things she knows Jack would dislike about him. This troubles Liz and she is even more upset when Jack gives Criss money for him to start his business, as Liz knows this gives Jack more power in her relationship.

Meanwhile, Tracy Jordan (Tracy Morgan) offends gay people in a stand-up rant. Liz writes an apology for him to be issued. Tracy takes offense to the fact that Liz calls him an idiot in it. He then calls upon all the idiots of the world (including special guest star Denise Richards) to strike in front of the building, which upsets Liz and perturbs Jack.

Finally, Jenna Maroney (Jane Krakowski) convinces Kenneth Parcell (Jack McBrayer) to sneak into a supply closet and get some lights for her dressing room. However, Kenneth drops them, which emits mercury fumes into the air. Later, they find Pete in the closet unconscious, supposedly due to the fumes. They call Kelsey Grammer, their partner in crime from the episode "Reaganing", to help them clean up the situation.

== Reception ==
According to the Nielsen Media Research, this episode of 30 Rock was watched by 4.05 million households in its original American broadcast. It earned a 1.6 rating/4 share in the 18–49 demographic. This means that it was seen by 1.6 percent of all 18- to 49-year-olds, and 4 percent of all 18- to 49-year-olds watching television at the time of the broadcast.

Kevin Fitzpatrick of TV Over Mind commented that the episode had him "consistently giggling throughout", adding "sometimes I feel like even the thinnest of 30 Rock plots could squeak by on charisma and non-sequiturs, but “Idiots are People Two!” kept a strong balance of Liz, Tracy and Jenna plots even without its second half next week." However, he noted that the subject matter of Morgan's homophobic rant should have probably been left alone.
