= ATP Finals =

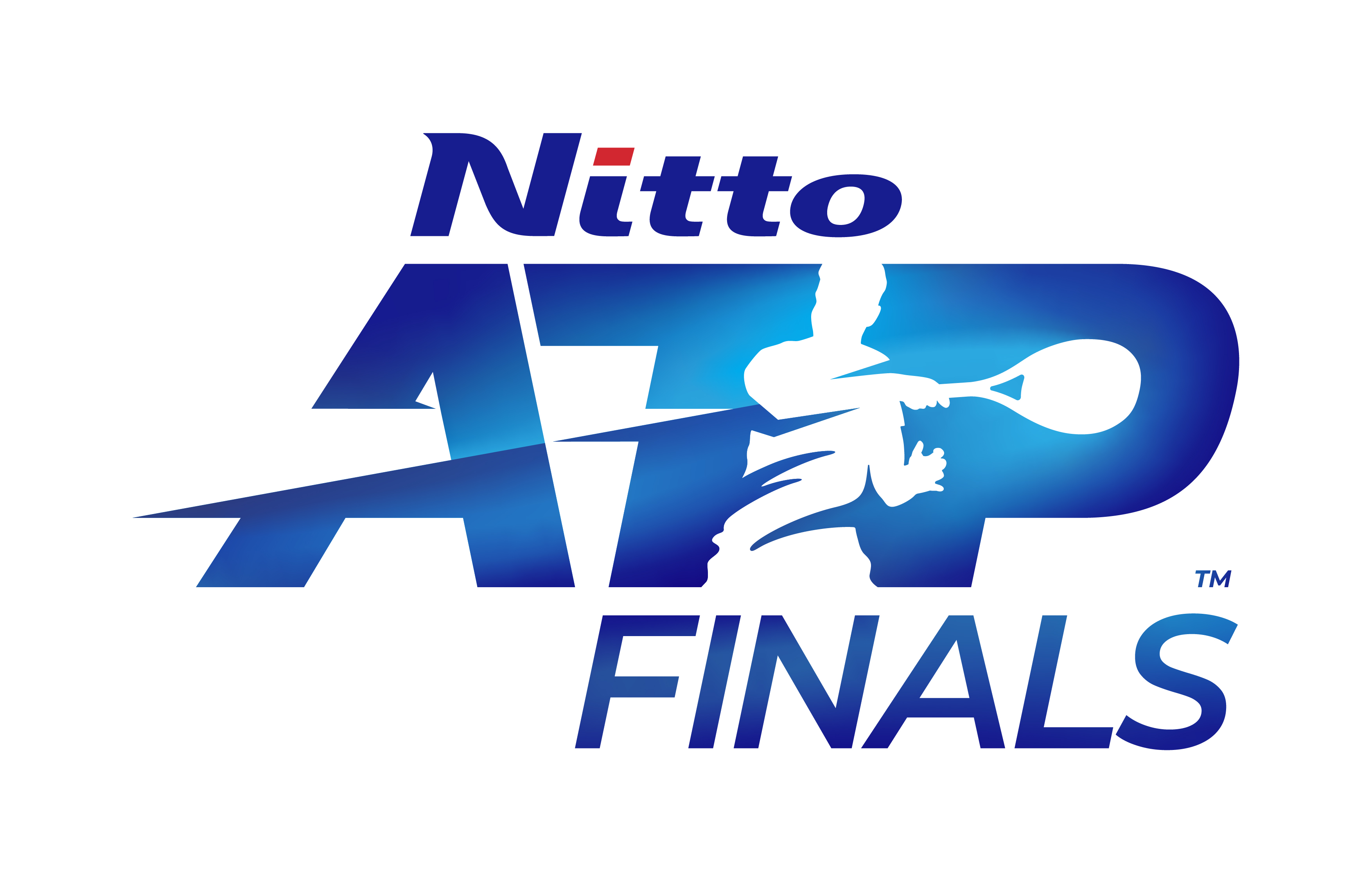

ATP Tour
- Founded: 1970; 56 years ago
- Location: Turin, Italy (2021–2028)
- Venue: Palasport Olimpico
- Category: Year-end championships
- Surface: Hard (indoor)
- Draw: 8 singles / 8 doubles
- Prize money: US$15,750,000 (2026)
- Website: nittoatpfinals.com

Current champions (2026)
- Singles: (Spain) Carlos Alcaraz
- Doubles: (France) Théo Arribagé (France) Albano Olivetti

The ATP Finals is the season-ending championship of the ATP Tour. It is the most significant tennis event in the men's annual calendar after the four majors, as it features the top eight singles players and top eight doubles teams based on their results throughout the season. The eighth spot is reserved, if needed, for a player or team who won a major in the current year and is ranked from ninth to twentieth.

The tournament uses a unique format not seen in other ATP Tour events, where the singles players and doubles teams are separated into two groups of four, within which they each play three round-robin matches. After the round-robin stage, the top two performers from each group play in knock-out semifinals and a final to determine the champion(s).

The tournament was first held in 1970, shortly after the beginning of the Open Era. Novak Djokovic holds the record for the most singles titles with seven, while the doubles team of Peter Fleming and John McEnroe jointly hold the record for the most doubles titles with seven (which the pair won consecutively, 1978–1984).

In the tournament's current format, the champion can earn a maximum of 1,500 ranking points, if they win the event after going undefeated in the round-robin stage. By winning the 2026 title, Carlos Alcaraz earned a record $5,171,000, the highest payout for an ATP tournament winner in tennis.

== Tournament ==
=== History ===
The ATP Finals is the fifth iteration of a championship which began in 1970. It was originally known as the Masters Grand Prix and was part of the Grand Prix tennis circuit. The Masters was a year-end showpiece event between the best players on the men's tour; under the administration of the Men's International Professional Tennis Council (MIPTC) made up of ATP, ITF, and tournament representatives. During this era the Masters existed as a high prize money special year-end event, that existed outside the standard weekly points race. It ran alongside the competing WCT Finals from 1971 to 1989.

In 1990, the Association of Tennis Professionals (ATP) took over the running of the men's tour and replaced the Masters with the "ATP Tour World Championships". World ranking points were now at stake, with an undefeated champion earning a maximum of 1500 points. The ITF, who continued to run the Grand Slam tournaments, created a rival year-end event known as the Grand Slam Cup, which was contested by the 16 players with the best records in the Grand Slam tournaments of the season (1990–99).

In December 1999, the ATP and ITF agreed to discontinue the two separate events and create a new jointly owned event called the "Tennis Masters Cup". As with the Masters Grand Prix and the ATP Tour World Championships, the Tennis Masters Cup was contested by eight players and teams. However, the player or team ranked number eight in the ATP Race world rankings was not guaranteed a spot: if a player or team won one of the year's majors and finished the year ranked from ninth to twentieth, they were included in the Tennis Masters Cup instead. If two outside the top eight won majors, the higher-ranked of the two in the world rankings took the final spot. This accommodation for major champions continues in the event's current form.

In 2009, the championship was renamed the "ATP World Tour Finals" and was held at The O2 Arena in London. The contract ran through 2013, but was extended multiple times until it was last held there in 2020. In 2017 the event was renamed the "ATP Finals". In April 2019, the ATP announced that Turin would host the ATP Finals from 2021 to 2025.

Years	Championships name
1970–89	Masters Grand Prix
1990–99	ATP Tour World Championships
2000–08	Tennis Masters Cup
2009–16	ATP World Tour Finals
2017–	ATP Finals

For most of its history, the event has been considered the most important indoor tennis tournament in the world (there were a few exceptions when the event was held outdoors: 1974 in Melbourne & 2003–04 in Houston). The indoor atmosphere allows for controlled conditions of play, both in terms of the court surface and the court's illumination.

In recent years it has been played on indoor hard courts, however, indoor carpet was used in some previous editions. On one occasion, when Melbourne hosted the event in 1974, the grass courts of Kooyong Stadium were used; the tournament was staged only 1–2 weeks before the 1975 Australian Open, which was also played on grass. Apart from 1974, all tournaments have been on a hard court variant, which has prompted calls from some players (such as Rafael Nadal) to feature a greater variety of surfaces, including clay courts.

For many years, the doubles event was held as a separate tournament staged the week after the singles competition, but more recently both events have been held together during the same week and in the same venue.

In 2020, amid the COVID-19 pandemic and in an effort to reduce the number of staff on-site, the ATP introduced live electronic line-calling powered by Hawk-Eye Live. Instead of line umpires, the system detects the relevant movements of the player and where the ball bounces on court. A pre-recorded voice announces "Out", "Fault", and "Foot fault". Video review was also introduced for suspected double bounces, touches, and other reviewable calls.

The tournament has traditionally been sponsored by the title sponsor of the tour; however, in 1990–2008 the competition was not sponsored, even though the singles portion of the event, as part of the ATP Tour, was sponsored by IBM. In 2009, the tournament gained Barclays PLC as its title sponsor. Barclays confirmed in 2015 that they would not renew their sponsorship deal once it expires in 2016. On 25 May 2017, it was announced that Nitto Denko would be the main sponsor for the tournament through 2020. In September 2020, Nitto Denko announced it will extend its title partnership of the ATP Finals for another five years, until 2025. In November 2025, Nitto Denko announced it will extend its title partnership of the ATP Finals for another five years, until 2030.

=== Qualification ===
The criteria to qualify for the ATP Finals are as follows:

1. Players and teams who finish the season ranked in the top seven in the ATP race automatically qualify.
2. The eighth spot is reserved for a player or team who won a major in the season and is ranked from eighth to twentieth. Goran Ivanišević in 2001, Albert Costa in 2002, Gastón Gaudio in 2004, and Marin Čilić in 2014 are the singles players who have qualified due to their major title despite not ending in the top eight in the ATP race.
3. If more than one player or team won a Grand Slam event in the season and are ranked from eighth to twentieth, then whoever is highest-ranked is awarded the eighth spot; whoever is second highest-ranked is made first alternate.
4. If there is no player who won a major in the season and is ranked from eighth to twentieth, then the eight spot is awarded to the player ranked eighth.

Two alternates also attend the ATP Finals. If the first alternate has already been selected according to (3) mentioned above, then the second alternate is the highest-ranked player who has not otherwise qualified for the event. If both alternate spots are available, they are awarded to the two highest-ranked players who did not otherwise qualify for the event.

An alternate can replace a player who withdraws before the round-robin stage is over, so long as the player who withdraws still has at least one round-robin match left to play. When an alternate enters the competition, his results are considered separately, i.e. the alternate does not inherit the results of the player he is replacing. If an alternate's round-robin results qualify him for the semifinals, then he may continue into the single-elimination rounds.

=== Format ===
Unlike other events on the ATP Tour, the ATP Finals is not a straightforward single-elimination tournament. The eight players and teams are divided into two groups of four and each play three round-robin matches against the others in their group. After the round-robin stage, the top two performers in each group advance to the semifinals in a knock-out stage. The two winners of the semifinals play a final to determine the champion. In this format, it is theoretically possible to advance to the semifinals with two round-robin losses, but no player in the history of the singles tournament has won the title after losing more than one round-robin match.

To create the groups, the eight players and teams are seeded according to rank. The first and second seeds are placed in Group A and Group B, respectively. The remaining seeds are drawn in pairs (third and fourth, fifth and sixth, seventh and eighth); the first of the pair to be drawn goes to Group A and the other to Group B, and so on.

The format described above has been in place for all editions of the tournament except the following years:

- 1970–71: All round robin (no groups), no semifinals or finals, the winner was decided based on round-robin standings.
- 1982–84: 12-player three-round single-elimination tournament (no round robin), the top four seeds received byes in the first round.
- 1985: 16-player four-round single-elimination tournament (no round robin), no byes.

=== Group standings ===
Since 2019, the group standings at the end of the round-robin stage are determined by, in order:

- Most matches won.
- Most matches played (for example: the record 1–2 beats 1–1, and 2–1 beats 2–0).

If some players are tied, the following tiebreakers are used depending on how many players are tied (two or three):

If two players are tied, then:

- Head-to-head round-robin result.

If three players are tied, then the following tiebreakers are used, in order, until all three players are no longer tied OR until only two players are tied, at which point the two-player tie is broken by the head-to-head round robin result:

- Highest % of sets won.
- Highest % of games won.
- Highest ranking at the start of the tournament.

When calculating tiebreakers, a match that ended in a retirement is counted as a 0–2 sets loss for the retiring player and a 2–0 sets win for their opponent, regardless of the actual score when the retirement occurred. When calculating the "Highest % of games won" tiebreaker, a match that ended in a retirement is disregarded.

=== Venues ===
ATP Finals is the men's premier indoor event of the season, only in three editions it was played outdoors; 1974, 2003 and 2004.

Years	City	Surface	Stadium	Capacity
1970	Tokyo, Japan	Carpet (i)	Tokyo Metropolitan Gymnasium	6,500
1971	Paris, France	Hard (i)	Stade Pierre de Coubertin	5,000
1972	Barcelona, Spain	Hard (i)	Palau Blaugrana	5,700
1973	Boston, United States	Hard (i)	Boston Garden	14,900
1974	Melbourne, Australia	Grass	Kooyong Stadium	8,500
1975	Stockholm, Sweden	Carpet (i)	Kungliga tennishallen	6,000
1976	Houston, United States	Carpet (i)	The Summit	16,300
1977–1989	New York City, United States	Carpet (i)	Madison Square Garden	18,000
1990–1995	Frankfurt, Germany	Carpet (i)	Festhalle Frankfurt	12,000
1996–1999	Hanover, Germany (Note: At Hanover, it was played on carpet in 1996 and on hard from 1997 to 1999.)	Carpet (i); Hard (i)	Hanover Fairground	15,000
2000	Lisbon, Portugal	Hard (i)	Pavilhão Atlântico	12,000
2001	Sydney, Australia	Hard (i)	Sydney SuperDome	17,500
2002	Shanghai, China	Hard (i)	SNIEC	10,000
2003–2004	Houston, United States	Hard	Westside Tennis Club	5,240
2005–2008	Shanghai, China (Note: At Shanghai, it was played on carpet in 2005 and on hard from 2006 to 2008.)	Carpet (i); Hard (i)	Qizhong Forest Sports City Arena	15,000
2009–2020	London, United Kingdom	Hard (i)	The O2 Arena	20,000
2021–2027	Turin, Italy	Hard (i)	Palasport Olimpico	12,000
2028–2030	TBD, Italy	Hard (i)	TBD	TBD

== Prize money, ranking points and trophies ==
The 2026 ATP Finals offers a total prize money pool of $15,750,000, an increase of 1.61% compared to 2025. The tournament awards the following ranking points and prize money, per victory (doubles prize money is per team):

Stage	Singles	Doubles	Points
Final win	$2,412,000	$356,800	500
Semi-final win	$1,206,000	$178,500	400
Round-robin match win	$405,000	$96,600	200
Participation fee	3 matches = $338,000; 2 matches = $253,000; 1 match = $169,000	3 matches = $134,200; 2 matches = $100,650; 1 match = $67,100	—N/a
Alternates	$156,000	$51,700	—N/a
Undefeated Champion	$5,171,000	$959,300	1,500

- An undefeated champion would earn the maximum 1,500 points, and $5,171,000 in singles or $959,300 in doubles.

== Past finals ==
=== Singles ===
Year	Champions	Runners-up	Score
1970	(United States) Stan Smith (1/1)	(Australia) Rod Laver	Round robin
1971	(Romania) Ilie Năstase (1/4)	(United States) Stan Smith	Round robin
1972	(Romania) Ilie Năstase (2/4)	(United States) Stan Smith	6–3, 6–2, 3–6, 2–6, 6–3
1973	(Romania) Ilie Năstase (3/4)	(Netherlands) Tom Okker	6–3, 7–5, 4–6, 6–3
1974	(Argentina) Guillermo Vilas (1/1)	(Romania) Ilie Năstase	7–6^{(8–6)}, 6–2, 3–6, 3–6, 6–4
1975	(Romania) Ilie Năstase (4/4)	(Sweden) Björn Borg	6–2, 6–2, 6–1
1976	(Spain) Manuel Orantes (1/1)	(Poland) Wojciech Fibak	5–7, 6–2, 0–6, 7–6^{(7–1)}, 6–1
1977	(United States) Jimmy Connors (1/1)	(Sweden) Björn Borg	6–4, 1–6, 6–4
1978	(United States) John McEnroe (1/3)	(United States) Arthur Ashe	6–7^{(5–7)}, 6–3, 7–5
1979	(Sweden) Björn Borg (1/2)	(United States) Vitas Gerulaitis	6–2, 6–2
1980	(Sweden) Björn Borg (2/2)	(Czechoslovakia) Ivan Lendl	6–4, 6–2, 6–2
1981	(Czechoslovakia) Ivan Lendl (1/5)	(United States) Vitas Gerulaitis	6–7^{(5–7)}, 2–6, 7–6^{(8–6)}, 6–2, 6–4
1982	(Czechoslovakia) Ivan Lendl (2/5)	(United States) John McEnroe	6–4, 6–4, 6–2
1983	(United States) John McEnroe (2/3)	(Czechoslovakia) Ivan Lendl	6–3, 6–4, 6–4
1984	(United States) John McEnroe (3/3)	(Czechoslovakia) Ivan Lendl	7–5, 6–0, 6–4
1985	(Czechoslovakia) Ivan Lendl (3/5)	(West Germany) Boris Becker	6–2, 7–6^{(7–4)}, 6–3
1986	(Czechoslovakia) Ivan Lendl (4/5)	(West Germany) Boris Becker	6–4, 6–4, 6–4
1987	(Czechoslovakia) Ivan Lendl (5/5)	(Sweden) Mats Wilander	6–2, 6–2, 6–3
1988	(West Germany) Boris Becker (1/3)	(Czechoslovakia) Ivan Lendl	5–7, 7–6^{(7–5)}, 3–6, 6–2, 7–6^{(7–5)}
1989	(Sweden) Stefan Edberg (1/1)	(West Germany) Boris Becker	4–6, 7–6^{(8–6)}, 6–3, 6–1
1990	(United States) Andre Agassi (1/1)	(Sweden) Stefan Edberg	5–7, 7–6^{(7–5)}, 7–5, 6–2
1991	(United States) Pete Sampras (1/5)	(United States) Jim Courier	3–6, 7–6^{(7–5)}, 6–3, 6–4
1992	(Germany) Boris Becker (2/3)	(United States) Jim Courier	6–4, 6–3, 7–5
1993	(Germany) Michael Stich (1/1)	(United States) Pete Sampras	7–6^{(7–3)}, 2–6, 7–6^{(9–7)}, 6–2
1994	(United States) Pete Sampras (2/5)	(Germany) Boris Becker	4–6, 6–3, 7–5, 6–4
1995	(Germany) Boris Becker (3/3)	(United States) Michael Chang	7–6^{(7–3)}, 6–0, 7–6^{(7–5)}
1996	(United States) Pete Sampras (3/5)	(Germany) Boris Becker	3–6, 7–6^{(7–5)}, 7–6^{(7–4)}, 6–7^{(11–13)}, 6–4
1997	(United States) Pete Sampras (4/5)	(Russia) Yevgeny Kafelnikov	6–3, 6–2, 6–2
1998	(Spain) Àlex Corretja (1/1)	(Spain) Carlos Moyá	3–6, 3–6, 7–5, 6–3, 7–5
1999	(United States) Pete Sampras (5/5)	(United States) Andre Agassi	6–1, 7–5, 6–4
2000	(Brazil) Gustavo Kuerten (1/1)	(United States) Andre Agassi	6–4, 6–4, 6–4
2001	(Australia) Lleyton Hewitt (1/2)	(France) Sébastien Grosjean	6–3, 6–3, 6–4
2002	(Australia) Lleyton Hewitt (2/2)	(Spain) Juan Carlos Ferrero	7–5, 7–5, 2–6, 2–6, 6–4
2003	(Switzerland) Roger Federer (1/6)	(United States) Andre Agassi	6–3, 6–0, 6–4
2004	(Switzerland) Roger Federer (2/6)	(Australia) Lleyton Hewitt	6–3, 6–2
2005	(Argentina) David Nalbandian (1/1)	(Switzerland) Roger Federer	6–7^{(4–7)}, 6–7^{(11–13)}, 6–2, 6–1, 7–6^{(7–3)}
2006	(Switzerland) Roger Federer (3/6)	(United States) James Blake	6–0, 6–3, 6–4
2007	(Switzerland) Roger Federer (4/6)	(Spain) David Ferrer	6–2, 6–3, 6–2
2008	(Serbia) Novak Djokovic (1/7)	(Russia) Nikolay Davydenko	6–1, 7–5
2009	(Russia) Nikolay Davydenko (1/1)	(Argentina) Juan Martín del Potro	6–3, 6–4
2010	(Switzerland) Roger Federer (5/6)	(Spain) Rafael Nadal	6–3, 3–6, 6–1
2011	(Switzerland) Roger Federer (6/6)	(France) Jo-Wilfried Tsonga	6–3, 6–7^{(6–8)}, 6–3
2012	(Serbia) Novak Djokovic (2/7)	(Switzerland) Roger Federer	7–6^{(8–6)}, 7–5
2013	(Serbia) Novak Djokovic (3/7)	(Spain) Rafael Nadal	6–3, 6–4
2014	(Serbia) Novak Djokovic (4/7)	(Switzerland) Roger Federer	walkover
2015	(Serbia) Novak Djokovic (5/7)	(Switzerland) Roger Federer	6–3, 6–4
2016	(United Kingdom) Andy Murray (1/1)	(Serbia) Novak Djokovic	6–3, 6–4
2017	(Bulgaria) Grigor Dimitrov (1/1)	(Belgium) David Goffin	7–5, 4–6, 6–3
2018	(Germany) Alexander Zverev (1/2)	(Serbia) Novak Djokovic	6–4, 6–3
2019	(Greece) Stefanos Tsitsipas (1/1)	(Austria) Dominic Thiem	6–7^{(6–8)}, 6–2, 7–6^{(7–4)}
2020	(Russia) Daniil Medvedev (1/1)	(Austria) Dominic Thiem	4–6, 7–6^{(7–2)}, 6–4
2021	(Germany) Alexander Zverev (2/2)	(Russia) Daniil Medvedev	6–4, 6–4
2022	(Serbia) Novak Djokovic (6/7)	(Norway) Casper Ruud	7–5, 6–3
2023	(Serbia) Novak Djokovic (7/7)	(Italy) Jannik Sinner	6–3, 6–3
2024	(Italy) Jannik Sinner (1/2)	(United States) Taylor Fritz	6–4, 6–4
2025	(Italy) Jannik Sinner (2/2)	(Spain) Carlos Alcaraz	7–6^{(7–4)}, 7–5
2026	(Spain) Carlos Alcaraz (1/1)	(Germany) Alexander Zverev	6–2, 7–6^{(9–7)}

=== Doubles ===
Year	Champions	Runners-up	Score
1970	(United States) Stan Smith (1/1) (United States) Arthur Ashe (1/1)	(Czechoslovakia) Jan Kodeš (Australia) Rod Laver	Round robin
1971–1974: Not Held
1975	(Spain) Juan Gisbert (1/1) (Spain) Manuel Orantes (1/1)	(West Germany) Jürgen Fassbender (West Germany) Hans-Jürgen Pohmann	Round robin
1976	(United States) Fred McNair (1/1) (United States) Sherwood Stewart (1/1)	(United States) Brian Gottfried (Mexico) Raúl Ramírez	6–3, 5–7, 5–7, 6–4, 6–4
1977	(South Africa) Bob Hewitt (1/1) (South Africa) Frew McMillan (1/1)	(United States) Robert Lutz (United States) Stan Smith	7–5, 7–6, 6–3
1978	(United States) Peter Fleming (1/7) (United States) John McEnroe (1/7)	(Poland) Wojciech Fibak (Netherlands) Tom Okker	6–4, 6–2, 6–4
1979	(United States) Peter Fleming (2/7) (United States) John McEnroe (2/7)	(Poland) Wojciech Fibak (Netherlands) Tom Okker	6–3, 7–6, 6–1
1980	(United States) Peter Fleming (3/7) (United States) John McEnroe (3/7)	(Australia) Peter McNamara (Australia) Paul McNamee	6–4, 6–3
1981	(United States) Peter Fleming (4/7) (United States) John McEnroe (4/7)	(South Africa) Kevin Curren (United States) Steve Denton	6–3, 6–3
1982	(United States) Peter Fleming (5/7) (United States) John McEnroe (5/7)	(United States) Sherwood Stewart (United States) Ferdi Taygan	7–5, 6–3
1983	(United States) Peter Fleming (6/7) (United States) John McEnroe (6/7)	(Czechoslovakia) Pavel Složil (Czechoslovakia) Tomáš Šmíd	6–2, 6–2
1984	(United States) Peter Fleming (7/7) (United States) John McEnroe (7/7)	(Australia) Mark Edmondson (United States) Sherwood Stewart	6–3, 6–1
1985	(Sweden) Stefan Edberg (1/2) (Sweden) Anders Järryd (1/3)	(Sweden) Joakim Nyström (Sweden) Mats Wilander	6–1, 7–6^{(7–5)}
1986	(Sweden) Stefan Edberg (2/2) (Sweden) Anders Järryd (2/3)	(France) Guy Forget (France) Yannick Noah	6–3, 7–6^{(7–2)}, 6–3
1987	(Czechoslovakia) Miloslav Mečíř (1/1) (Czechoslovakia) Tomáš Šmíd (1/1)	(United States) Ken Flach (United States) Robert Seguso	6–4, 7–5, 6–7^{(5–7)}, 6–3
1988	(United States) Rick Leach (1/3) (United States) Jim Pugh (1/1)	(Spain) Sergio Casal (Spain) Emilio Sánchez	6–4, 6–3, 2–6, 6–0
1989	(United States) Jim Grabb (1/1) (United States) Patrick McEnroe (1/1)	(Australia) John Fitzgerald (Sweden) Anders Järryd	7–5, 7–6^{(7–4)}, 5–7, 6–3
1990	(France) Guy Forget (1/1) (Switzerland) Jakob Hlasek (1/1)	(Spain) Sergio Casal (Spain) Emilio Sánchez	6–4, 7–6^{(7–5)}, 5–7, 6–4
1991	(Australia) John Fitzgerald (1/1) (Sweden) Anders Järryd (3/3)	(United States) Ken Flach (United States) Robert Seguso	6–4, 6–4, 2–6, 6–4
1992	(Australia) Todd Woodbridge (1/2) (Australia) Mark Woodforde (1/2)	(Australia) John Fitzgerald (Sweden) Anders Järryd	6–2, 7–6^{(7–4)}, 5–7, 3–6, 6–3
1993	(Netherlands) Jacco Eltingh (1/2) (Netherlands) Paul Haarhuis (1/2)	(Australia) Todd Woodbridge (Australia) Mark Woodforde	7–6^{(7–4)}, 7–6^{(7–5)}, 6–4
1994	(Sweden) Jan Apell (1/1) (Sweden) Jonas Björkman (1/2)	(Australia) Todd Woodbridge (Australia) Mark Woodforde	6–4, 4–6, 4–6, 7–6^{(7–5)}, 7–6^{(8–6)}
1995	(Canada) Grant Connell (1/1) (United States) Patrick Galbraith (1/1)	(Netherlands) Jacco Eltingh (Netherlands) Paul Haarhuis	7–6^{(8–6)}, 7–6^{(8–6)}, 3–6, 7–6^{(7–2)}
1996	(Australia) Todd Woodbridge (2/2) (Australia) Mark Woodforde (2/2)	(Canada) Sébastien Lareau (United States) Alex O'Brien	6–4, 5–7, 6–2, 7–6^{(7–3)}
1997	(United States) Rick Leach (2/3) (United States) Jonathan Stark (1/1)	(India) Mahesh Bhupathi (India) Leander Paes	6–3, 6–4, 7–6^{(7–3)}
1998	(Netherlands) Jacco Eltingh (2/2) (Netherlands) Paul Haarhuis (2/2)	(The Bahamas) Mark Knowles (Canada) Daniel Nestor	6–4, 6–2, 7–5
1999	(Canada) Sébastien Lareau (1/1) (United States) Alex O'Brien (1/1)	(India) Mahesh Bhupathi (India) Leander Paes	6–3, 6–2, 6–2
2000	(United States) Donald Johnson (1/1) (South Africa) Piet Norval (1/1)	(India) Mahesh Bhupathi (India) Leander Paes	7–6^{(10–8)}, 6–3, 6–4
2001	(South Africa) Ellis Ferreira (1/1) (United States) Rick Leach (3/3)	(Czech Republic) Petr Pála (Czech Republic) Pavel Vízner	6–7^{(6–8)}, 7–6^{(7–2)}, 6–4, 6–4
2002: Not held
2003	(United States) Bob Bryan (1/4) (United States) Mike Bryan (1/5)	(France) Michaël Llodra (France) Fabrice Santoro	6–7^{(6–8)}, 6–3, 3–6, 7–6^{(7–3)}, 6–4
2004	(United States) Bob Bryan (2/4) (United States) Mike Bryan (2/5)	(Zimbabwe) Wayne Black (Zimbabwe) Kevin Ullyett	4–6, 7–5, 6–4, 6–2
2005	(France) Michaël Llodra (1/1) (France) Fabrice Santoro (1/1)	(India) Leander Paes (Serbia and Montenegro) Nenad Zimonjić	6–7^{(6–8)}, 6–3, 7–6^{(7–4)}
2006	(Sweden) Jonas Björkman (2/2) (Belarus) Max Mirnyi (1/2)	(The Bahamas) Mark Knowles (Canada) Daniel Nestor	6–2, 6–4
2007	(The Bahamas) Mark Knowles (1/1) (Canada) Daniel Nestor (1/4)	(Sweden) Simon Aspelin (Austria) Julian Knowle	6–2, 6–3
2008	(Canada) Daniel Nestor (2/4) (Serbia) Nenad Zimonjić (1/2)	(United States) Bob Bryan (United States) Mike Bryan	7–6^{(7–3)}, 6–2
2009	(United States) Bob Bryan (3/4) (United States) Mike Bryan (3/5)	(Belarus) Max Mirnyi (Israel) Andy Ram	7–6^{(7–5)}, 6–3
2010	(Canada) Daniel Nestor (3/4) (Serbia) Nenad Zimonjić (2/2)	(India) Mahesh Bhupathi (Belarus) Max Mirnyi	7–6^{(8–6)}, 6–4
2011	(Belarus) Max Mirnyi (2/2) (Canada) Daniel Nestor (4/4)	(Poland) Mariusz Fyrstenberg (Poland) Marcin Matkowski	7–5, 6–3
2012	(Spain) Marcel Granollers (1/1) (Spain) Marc López (1/1)	(India) Mahesh Bhupathi (India) Rohan Bopanna	7–5, 3–6, [10–3]
2013	(Spain) David Marrero (1/1) (Spain) Fernando Verdasco (1/1)	(United States) Bob Bryan (United States) Mike Bryan	7–5, 6–7^{(3–7)}, [10–7]
2014	(United States) Bob Bryan (4/4) (United States) Mike Bryan (4/5)	(Croatia) Ivan Dodig (Brazil) Marcelo Melo	6–7^{(5–7)}, 6–2, [10–7]
2015	(Netherlands) Jean-Julien Rojer (1/1) (Romania) Horia Tecău (1/1)	(India) Rohan Bopanna (Romania) Florin Mergea	6–4, 6–3
2016	(Finland) Henri Kontinen (1/2) (Australia) John Peers (1/2)	(South Africa) Raven Klaasen (United States) Rajeev Ram	2–6, 6–1, [10–8]
2017	(Finland) Henri Kontinen (2/2) (Australia) John Peers (2/2)	(Poland) Łukasz Kubot (Brazil) Marcelo Melo	6–4, 6–2
2018	(United States) Jack Sock (1/1) (United States) Mike Bryan (5/5)	(France) Pierre-Hugues Herbert (France) Nicolas Mahut	5–7, 6–1, [13–11]
2019	(France) Pierre-Hugues Herbert (1/2) (France) Nicolas Mahut (1/2)	(South Africa) Raven Klaasen (New Zealand) Michael Venus	6–3, 6–4
2020	(Netherlands) Wesley Koolhof (1/1) (Croatia) Nikola Mektić (1/1)	(Austria) Jürgen Melzer (France) Édouard Roger-Vasselin	6–2, 3–6, [10–5]
2021	(France) Pierre-Hugues Herbert (2/2) (France) Nicolas Mahut (2/2)	(United States) Rajeev Ram (United Kingdom) Joe Salisbury	6–4, 7–6^{(7–0)}
2022	(United States) Rajeev Ram (1/2) (United Kingdom) Joe Salisbury (1/2)	(Croatia) Nikola Mektić (Croatia) Mate Pavić	7–6^{(7–4)}, 6–4
2023	(United States) Rajeev Ram (2/2) (United Kingdom) Joe Salisbury (2/2)	(Spain) Marcel Granollers (Argentina) Horacio Zeballos	6–3, 6–4
2024	(Germany) Kevin Krawietz (1/1) (Germany) Tim Pütz (1/1)	(El Salvador) Marcelo Arévalo (Croatia) Mate Pavić	7–6^{(7–5)}, 7–6^{(8–6)}
2025	(Finland) Harri Heliövaara (1/1) (United Kingdom) Henry Patten (1/1)	(United Kingdom) Joe Salisbury (United Kingdom) Neal Skupski	7–5, 6–3
2026	(France) Théo Arribagé (1/1) (France) Albano Olivetti (1/1)	(El Salvador) Marcelo Arévalo (Croatia) Mate Pavić	3–6, 7–6^{(7–2)}, [10–6]

== List of champions ==
- Current through 2026 ATP Finals (active players in **bold**).

=== Singles ===
Titles	Player	Years
7	(Serbia) **Novak Djokovic**	2008, 12–15, 22–23
6	(Switzerland) Roger Federer	2003–04, 06–07, 10–11
5	(Czechoslovakia) Ivan Lendl	1981–82, 85–87
5	(United States) Pete Sampras	1991, 94, 96–97, 99
4	(Romania) Ilie Năstase	1971–73, 75
3	(United States) John McEnroe	1978, 83–84
3	(Germany) Boris Becker	1988, 92, 95
2	(Sweden) Björn Borg	1979–80
2	(Australia) Lleyton Hewitt	2001–02
2	(Germany) **Alexander Zverev**	2018, 21
2	(Italy) **Jannik Sinner**	2024–25
1	(United States) Stan Smith	1970
1	(Argentina) Guillermo Vilas	1974
1	(Spain) Manuel Orantes	1976
1	(United States) Jimmy Connors	1977
1	(Sweden) Stefan Edberg	1989
1	(United States) Andre Agassi	1990
1	(Germany) Michael Stich	1993
1	(Spain) Àlex Corretja	1998
1	(Brazil) Gustavo Kuerten	2000
1	(Argentina) David Nalbandian	2005
1	(Russia) Nikolay Davydenko	2009
1	(United Kingdom) Andy Murray	2016
1	(Bulgaria) **Grigor Dimitrov**	2017
1	(Greece) **Stefanos Tsitsipas**	2019
1	(Russia) **Daniil Medvedev**	2020
1	(Spain) **Carlos Alcaraz**	2026

=== Doubles ===
Titles	Player	Years
7	(United States) Peter Fleming; (United States) John McEnroe	1978–84
5	(United States) Mike Bryan	2003–04, 09, 14, 18
4	(Canada) Daniel Nestor	2007–08, 10–11
4	(United States) Bob Bryan	2003–04, 09, 14
3	(Sweden) Anders Järryd	1985–86, 91
3	(United States) Rick Leach	1988, 97, 2001
2	(Sweden) Stefan Edberg	1985–86
2	(Australia) Todd Woodbridge; (Australia) Mark Woodforde	1992, 96
2	(Netherlands) Jacco Eltingh; (Netherlands) Paul Haarhuis	1993, 98
2	(Sweden) Jonas Björkman	1994, 2006
2	(Serbia) Nenad Zimonjić	2008, 10
2	(Belarus) Max Mirnyi	2006, 11
2	(Finland) Henri Kontinen; (Australia) **John Peers**	2016–17
2	(France) **Pierre-Hugues Herbert**; (France) Nicolas Mahut	2019, 21
2	(United States) **Rajeev Ram**; (United Kingdom) **Joe Salisbury**	2022–23
1	(United States) Stan Smith; (United States) Arthur Ashe	1970
1	(Spain) Juan Gisbert; (Spain) Manuel Orantes	1975
1	(United States) Fred McNair; (United States) Sherwood Stewart	1976
1	(South Africa) Bob Hewitt; (South Africa) Frew McMillan	1977
1	(Czechoslovakia) Miloslav Mečíř; (Czechoslovakia) Tomáš Šmíd	1987
1	(United States) Jim Pugh	1988
1	(United States) Jim Grabb; (United States) Patrick McEnroe	1989
1	(France) Guy Forget; (Switzerland) Jakob Hlasek	1990
1	(Australia) John Fitzgerald	1991
1	(Sweden) Jan Apell	1994
1	(Canada) Grant Connell; (United States) Patrick Galbraith	1995
1	(United States) Jonathan Stark	1997
1	(Canada) Sébastien Lareau; (United States) Alex O'Brien	1999
1	(United States) Donald Johnson; (South Africa) Piet Norval	2000
1	(South Africa) Ellis Ferreira	2001
1	(France) Michaël Llodra; (France) Fabrice Santoro	2005
1	(The Bahamas) Mark Knowles	2007
1	(Spain) **Marcel Granollers**; (Spain) Marc López	2012
1	(Spain) David Marrero; (Spain) Fernando Verdasco	2013
1	(Netherlands) **Jean-Julien Rojer**; (Romania) Horia Tecău	2015
1	(United States) Jack Sock	2018
1	(Netherlands) Wesley Koolhof; (Croatia) **Nikola Mektić**	2020
1	(Germany) **Kevin Krawietz**; (Germany) **Tim Pütz**	2024
1	(Finland) **Harri Heliövaara**; (United Kingdom) **Henry Patten**	2025
1	(France) **Théo Arribagé**; (France) **Albano Olivetti**	2026

== Records and statistics ==
- Current through 2025 ATP Finals (active players in **bold**).

=== Singles ===
#	Titles
7	(Serbia) **Novak Djokovic**
6	(Switzerland) Roger Federer
5	(Czechoslovakia) Ivan Lendl
5	(United States) Pete Sampras
4	(Romania) Ilie Năstase

#	Consecutive titles
4	(Serbia) **Novak Djokovic**
3	(Romania) Ilie Năstase
3	(Czechoslovakia) Ivan Lendl
2	(Sweden) Björn Borg
2	(Czechoslovakia) Ivan Lendl
2	(United States) John McEnroe
2	(United States) Pete Sampras
2	(Australia) Lleyton Hewitt
2	(Switzerland) Roger Federer (3x)
2	(Serbia) Novak Djokovic
2	(Italy) **Jannik Sinner**

#	Finals
10	(Switzerland) Roger Federer
9	(Czechoslovakia) Ivan Lendl
9	(Serbia) **Novak Djokovic**
8	(Germany) Boris Becker
6	(United States) Pete Sampras

#	Matches won
59	(Switzerland) Roger Federer
50	(Serbia) **Novak Djokovic**
39	(Czechoslovakia) Ivan Lendl
36	(Germany) Boris Becker
35	(United States) Pete Sampras

#	Editions played
17	(Switzerland) Roger Federer
16	(Serbia) **Novak Djokovic**
13	(United States) Andre Agassi
12	(Czechoslovakia) Ivan Lendl
11	(United States) Jimmy Connors
11	(Germany) Boris Becker
11	(United States) Pete Sampras
11	(Spain) Rafael Nadal

=== Doubles ===
#	Titles
7	(United States) Peter Fleming
7	(United States) John McEnroe
5	(United States) Mike Bryan
4	(Canada) Daniel Nestor
4	(United States) Bob Bryan

#	Consecutive titles
7	(United States) Peter Fleming (United States) John McEnroe
2	(Sweden) Stefan Edberg (Sweden) Anders Järryd
2	(United States) Mike Bryan (United States) Bob Bryan
2	(Canada) Daniel Nestor (2x)
2	(Finland) Henri Kontinen (Australia) John Peers
2	(United States) **Rajeev Ram** (United Kingdom) **Joe Salisbury**

#	Finals
7	(United States) Peter Fleming
7	(United States) John McEnroe
7	(United States) Mike Bryan
6	(Canada) Daniel Nestor
6	(United States) Bob Bryan

#	Matches won
42	(United States) Mike Bryan
38	(United States) Bob Bryan
34	(Canada) Daniel Nestor
29	(Australia) Todd Woodbridge
25	(Sweden) Anders Järryd
25	(Australia) Mark Woodforde

#	Editions played
16	(United States) Mike Bryan
15	(Canada) Daniel Nestor
15	(United States) Bob Bryan
14	(India) Leander Paes
12	(The Bahamas) Mark Knowles
12	(India) Mahesh Bhupathi

=== Youngest & oldest champions ===
Singles	Youngest	(United States) John McEnroe	19 years, 10 months	1978
Singles	Oldest	(Serbia) Novak Djokovic	36 years, 5 months	2023
Doubles	Youngest	(United States) John McEnroe	19 years, 10 months	1978
Doubles	Oldest	(United States) Mike Bryan	40 years, 6 months	2018

== Year-end championships triple & double ==
=== Double crown ===
- Winning the year-end championships in both singles and doubles in the same year.

Player	Year
(United States) John McEnroe	1978 (S–D), 1983 (S–D), 1984 (S–D)
(United States) Stan Smith	1970 (S–D)

=== Year-end championships triple ===
- ATP YEC (active); played since 1970.
- WCT YEC (defunct); played from 1971 to 1989.
- ITF YEC (defunct); played from 1990 to 1999.

Player	ATP Finals	WCT Finals	Grand Slam Cup
(Germany) Boris Becker	1988	1988	1996

=== ATP Finals – WCT Finals double ===
Player	ATP Finals	WCT Finals
(United States) Stan Smith	1970	1973
(United States) Jimmy Connors	1977	1977
(United States) John McEnroe	1978	1979
(Sweden) Björn Borg	1979	1976
(Czech Republic) Ivan Lendl	1981	1982
(Germany) Boris Becker	1988	1988

=== ATP Finals – Grand Slam Cup double ===
Player	ATP Finals	Grand Slam Cup
(United States) Pete Sampras	1991	1990
(Germany) Michael Stich	1993	1992
(Germany) Boris Becker	1988	1996

=== Generations double ===
Player	Next Gen Finals	ATP Finals
(Greece) Stefanos Tsitsipas	2018	2019
(Italy) Jannik Sinner	2019	2024
(Spain) Carlos Alcaraz	2021	2026

== Titles by country ==
=== Singles ===
11	United States (5 players)

7	Serbia (1 player)

6	West Germany / Germany (3 players), Switzerland (1 player)

5	Czechoslovakia (1 player)

4	Romania (1 player)

3	Spain (3 players), Sweden (2 players)

2	Argentina (2 players), Australia (1 player), Italy (1 player), Russia (2 players)

1	Brazil, Bulgaria, Great Britain, Greece

=== Doubles ===
Note: Titles, won by a team of players from same country, count as one title, not two.

23	United States (18 players)

6	Canada (3 players)

5	Australia (4 players), France (7 players), Sweden (4 players)

4	Netherlands (4 players)

3	Finland (2 players), Great Britain (2 players), South Africa (4 players), Spain (6 players)

2	Belarus (1 player), Serbia (1 player)

1	Bahamas, Croatia, Czechoslovakia (2 players), Germany (2 players), Romania, Switzerland

== See also ==
- WCT Finals (1971–89)
- Grand Slam Cup (1990–99)
- ATP Finals appearances
- ATP Masters 1000 tournaments
- WTA Finals
