= 1982 Volvo Masters – Singles =

Singles
- 1982 Volvo Masters

Final
- Champion: (Czechoslovakia) Ivan Lendl
- Runner-up: (United States) John McEnroe
- Score: 6–4, 6–4, 6–2

Details
- Draw: 12

Events
Singles	Doubles
← 1981 ·	ATP Finals	· 1983 →

Defending champion Ivan Lendl successfully defended his title, defeating John McEnroe in the final, 6–4, 6–4, 6–2 to win the singles title at the 1982 Volvo Masters.

== Draw ==
=== Key ===
- Q = Qualifier
- WC = Wild card
- LL = Lucky loser
- Alt = Alternate
- SE = Special exempt
- PR = Protected ranking
- ITF = ITF entry
- JE = Junior exempt
- w/o = Walkover
- r = Retired
- d = Defaulted
- SR = Special ranking

=== Finals ===
Quarter-finals
8	(United States) Johan Kriek	6	4	6
10	(United States) Steve Denton	3	6	2
6	(United States) Vitas Gerulaitis	6	3	2
12	(France) Yannick Noah	4	6	6

Semi-finals
1	(United States) Jimmy Connors	7	6
8	(United States) Johan Kriek	6	2
3	(Czechoslovakia) Ivan Lendl	6	7
12	(France) Yannick Noah	4	5

Final
1	(United States) Jimmy Connors	3	1
3	(Czechoslovakia) Ivan Lendl	6	6
Final
3	(United States) John McEnroe	6	6	6
4	(Argentina) Guillermo Vilas	3	4

== See also ==
- ATP World Tour Finals appearances
