= 1978 Colgate-Palmolive Masters – Singles =

Singles
- 1978 Colgate-Palmolive Masters

Final
- Champion: (United States) John McEnroe
- Runner-up: (United States) Arthur Ashe
- Score: 6–7^{(5–7)}, 6–3, 7–5

Details
- Draw: 8

Events
Singles	Doubles
- ATP Finals

John McEnroe defeated Arthur Ashe in the final, 6–7^{(5–7)}, 6–3, 7–5 to win the singles tennis title at the 1978 Colgate-Palmolive Masters. McEnroe saved two championships points, at 4–5 in the third set, en route to his first year-end championships title.

Jimmy Connors was the defending champion, but lost in the round-robin.

== Draw ==
Key

- Q = Qualifier
- WC = Wild card
- LL = Lucky loser
- Alt = Alternate
- ITF = ITF entry
- PR = Protected ranking
- SR = Special ranking
- SE = Special exempt
- JE = Junior exempt
- JR = Junior Accelerator Programme entrant
- CO = College Accelerator Programme entrant
- NG = Next Gen Accelerator Program entrant
- w/o = Walkover
- r = Retired
- d = Defaulted

=== Finals ===
Semifinals
(United States) Arthur Ashe	7	3	6
(United States) Brian Gottfried	5	6	3
(United States) John McEnroe	6	6
(United States) Eddie Dibbs	1	4

Final
(United States) Arthur Ashe	7^{7}	3	5
(United States) John McEnroe	6^{5}	6	7

=== Group A ===
	(United States) McEnroe	(United States) Ashe	(United States) Connors	(United States) Solomon	RR; W–L	Set; W–L	Game; W–L	Standings
(United States) John McEnroe		6–3, 6–1	7–5, 3–0, r	6–3, 6–2	3–0	5–0	34–14	1
(United States) Arthur Ashe	3–6, 1–6		–	6–1, 6–4	1–1	2–2	16–17	2
(United States) Jimmy Connors	5–7, 0–3, r	–		6–1, 6–2	1–1	2–1	17–13	3
(United States) Harold Solomon	3–6, 2–6	1–6, 4–6	1–6, 2–6		0–3	0–6	13–36	4

Standings are determined by: 1. number of wins; 2. number of matches; 3. in two-players-ties, head-to-head records; 4. in three-players-ties, percentage of sets won, or of games won; 5. steering-committee decision.

=== Group B ===
	(United States) Gottfried	(Mexico) Ramírez	(Italy) Barazzutti	(United States) Dibbs	RR; W–L	Set; W–L	Game; W–L	Standings
(United States) Brian Gottfried		6–4, 6–1	7–6, 6–4	6–3, 6–3	3–0	6–0	37–21	1
(Mexico) Raúl Ramírez	4–6, 1–6		3–6, 6–3, 6–4	0–6, 1–6	1–2	2–5	21–37	3
(Italy) Corrado Barazzutti	6–7, 4–6	6–3, 3–6, 4–6		4–6, 4–6	0–3	1–6	35–40	4
(United States) Eddie Dibbs	3–6, 3–6	6–0, 6–1	6–4, 6–4		2–1	4–2	30–21	2

Standings are determined by: 1. number of wins; 2. number of matches; 3. in two-players-ties, head-to-head records; 4. in three-players-ties, percentage of sets won, or of games won; 5. steering-committee decision.

== See also ==
- ATP World Tour Finals appearances
