= 1985 Nabisco Masters – Singles =

Singles
- 1985 Nabisco Masters

Final
- Champion: (Czechoslovakia) Ivan Lendl
- Runner-up: (West Germany) Boris Becker
- Score: 6–2, 7–6^{(7–4)}, 6–3

Details
- Draw: 16
- Seeds: 4

Events
Singles	Doubles
← 1984 ·	ATP Finals	· 1986 →

Ivan Lendl defeated Boris Becker in the final, 6–2, 7–6^{(7–4)}, 6–3 to win the singles title at the 1985 Nabisco Masters.

John McEnroe was the two-time defending champion, but lost in the first round to Brad Gilbert.

== Seeds ==
1. (Czechoslovakia) Ivan Lendl (champion)
2. (United States) John McEnroe (first round)
3. (Sweden) Mats Wilander (quarterfinal)
4. (Sweden) Stefan Edberg (first round)

== Draw ==
=== Key ===
- Q = Qualifier
- WC = Wild card
- LL = Lucky loser
- Alt = Alternate
- SE = Special exempt
- PR = Protected ranking
- ITF = ITF entry
- JE = Junior exempt
- w/o = Walkover
- r = Retired
- d = Defaulted
- SR = Special ranking

Quarter-finals
1	(Czechoslovakia) I Lendl	6	6
(Czechoslovakia) T Šmid	1	0
(France) Y Noah	4	4
(United States) T Mayotte	6	6
(Ecuador) Gómez	7	6
(France) H Leconte	6	1
4	(Sweden) S Edberg	2	6	2
(United States) J Kriek	6	4	6

Semi-finals
1	(Czechoslovakia) I Lendl	6	6
(United States) T Mayotte	3	3
(Ecuador) Gómez	6	6
(United States) J Kriek	3	2

Final
1	(Czechoslovakia) I Lendl	6	7
(Ecuador) Gómez	4	5
Final
1	(West Germany) B Becker	6	6	6
(Sweden) A Järryd	3	4

== See also ==
- ATP World Tour Finals appearances
