= Chalk Dust – The Umpire Strikes Back =

Single by The Brat
- B-side: "Moody Mole"
- Released: June 1982
- Genre: Novelty
- Length: 3:06
- Label: Hansa
- Songwriters: Mo Foster; Mike Walling; Roger Kitter
- Producers: Kaplan Kaye; Rob Wilder

"Chalk Dust – The Umpire Strikes Back" is a 1982 novelty song credited to The Brat and performed by British comedians Kaplan Kaye and Roger Kitter. The song satirises tennis champion John McEnroe who was notorious for his temper tantrums. It reached number 19 in the UK singles chart in July 1982. Its B-side was a track named "Moody Mole" and the cover art was by illustrator Graham Humphreys.

== The song ==
"Chalk Dust – The Umpire Strikes Back" is a satire of American tennis player John McEnroe and lampoons his infamous angry behaviour on the tennis court to a synthesizer beat. The entire song is a conversation between McEnroe (played by Roger Kitter) and the referee (played by Kaplan Kaye). They bicker until the referee finally loses his patience and shoots McEnroe dead. The line "The ball's in, everyone can see that the ball's in!" was an actual quotation from McEnroe.

The title is a pun on the film The Empire Strikes Back (1980) and the tennis term umpire. Released on the Hansa label, the single entered the UK Singles Chart on 10 July 1982. It reached a peak of number 19, and remained in the chart for 8 weeks. The song was also a Top 10 hit in the Netherlands and Belgium and a Top 20 hit in South Africa and Ireland.

== Charts ==
=== Weekly charts ===
Chart (1982)	Peak position
Belgium (Ultratop 50 Flanders)	5
Ireland (IRMA)	13
Netherlands (Dutch Top 40)	3
Netherlands (Single Top 100)	3
South Africa (Springbok Radio)	14
UK Singles (Official Charts)	19

=== Year-end charts ===
Chart (1982)	Position
Netherlands (Dutch Top 40)	45
Netherlands (Single Top 100)	43
