= Kaplan Kaye =

English actor (born 1949)

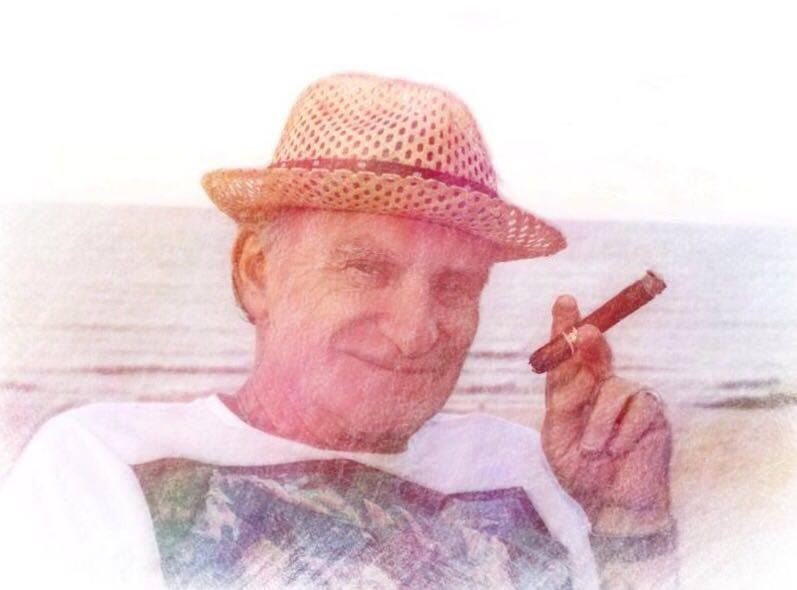
- Born: Kaplan Eric Kaye; 1949 (age 76–77); Watford, Hertfordshire, England
- Education: Corona Stage Academy
- Occupations: Actor; songwriter; musician
- Family: Davy Kaye (father)

Kaplan Eric Kaye (born 1949) is an English stage and screen actor, songwriter and musician, as well as a Past King Rat of the show-business charity the Grand Order of Water Rats.

== Biography ==
Born in Watford, Hertfordshire, the son of actor and entertainer Davy Kaye, Kaplan 'Kap' Kaye trained at the Corona Stage Academy. His television debut was as Young Scrooge in an adaptation of A Christmas Carol (1958), part of the Tales from Dickens series. Other television appearances include roles in The Charlie Drake Show (1961), Henry in six episodes of William (1963), Eagle Rock (1964), The Saint (1964), the mini-series The Three Musketeers (1966), Armchair Theatre (1967), Z-Cars (1968), The First Lady (1968), and Journey to the Unknown (1968).

Film roles include Corridors of Blood (1958), Passionate Summer (1958), Carlton-Browne of the F.O. (1959), Charles in Night Train for Inverness (1960), and Jimmie Noonan in The Whisperers (1967).

Theatre appearances include Oliver! (1960), Siddy Blitztein in the original production of Blitz! (1962) by Lionel Bart, and 'Puck' at the Royal Opera House in Covent Garden in Benjamin Britten's A Midsummer Night's Dream (1966). The latter performance was issued on an album.

With Roger Kitter, he co-wrote and performed on the humorous novelty hit song "Chalk Dust - The Umpire Strikes Back", credited to The Brat, which reached No. 19 in the UK Singles Chart in July 1982. In 1989 Kaye, with Harry Schulz, released a remix of the Flash and the Pan song "Waiting for a Train" titled "Waiting for a Train '89 (The Harrymeetskaplan Mix)", and released in the UK on Cha Cha Records. In 1994 Kaye won the British Academy of Songwriters, Composers and Authors (BASCA) award for ‘Best British Song' at the Cavan International Song Festival with his song "You Will Find Me There". Kaye's song "Take Me With You", a hit for Lyn Christopher, was sampled on the L.L. Cool J song "Feel My Heart Beat", featuring 50 Cent, in 2009. With Bill Dare he is half of the ukulele duo The Ukaye Ukes.

Kaye was King Rat of the British show-business charity the Grand Order of Water Rats from 2006 to 2008, and was 'Rat of the Year' in 2004.
