= Dance Like Nobody's Watching (30 Rock) =

- 30 Rock episode
- Episode no.: Season 6 Episode 1
- Directed by: John Riggi
- Written by: Tina Fey; Tracey Wigfield
- Production code: 601
- Original air date: January 12, 2012

Guest appearances
- John McEnroe as himself; Tituss Burgess as D'Fwan; John F. Mooney as Reverend Gary; New York Liberty Timeless Torches as themselves

Episode chronology
← Previous "Respawn"	Next → "Idiots Are People Two!"
- 30 Rock season 6

"Dance Like Nobody's Watching" is the first episode of the sixth season of the American television comedy series 30 Rock, and the 104th overall episode of the series. It was directed by John Riggi, and written by series creator, executive producer and lead actress Tina Fey and Tracey Wigfield. The episode originally aired on NBC in the United States on January 12, 2012. Guest stars in this episode include John McEnroe, Tituss Burgess and the New York Liberty Timeless Torches dance team.

In the episode, Jenna Maroney (Jane Krakowski) enjoys her new cultural relevance as a judge on a reality show; Jack Donaghy (Alec Baldwin) struggles to reconcile the way the show ridicules children with his status as a father; Jack and Tracy Jordan (Tracy Morgan) investigate why Liz Lemon (Tina Fey) is in such an uncharacteristically good mood; and Kenneth Parcell (Jack McBrayer) awaits the rapture while the others ridicule him.

Before the airing, NBC moved the program to a new timeslot at 8:00 p.m., moving it from its 10:00 p.m. slot. This episode of 30 Rock received generally positive reviews from television critics. According to Nielsen Media Research, it was watched by 4.47 million households during its original broadcast, and received a 1.8 rating/5 share among viewers in the 18–49 demographic.

== Plot ==
NBC's new reality show, America's Kidz Got Singing, features small children participating in a singing contest. Jenna Maroney (Jane Krakowski) is delighted with her new infamy as the judge that humiliates all of the children after their performances. Jack Donaghy (Alec Baldwin) is delighted with the show's high ratings, but as a new father, he feels guilty about the mistreatment of the children. After a disastrous attempt to change Jenna's behavior on the show, Jack confers with his one-year-old daughter. He willfully misinterprets Liddy's first word, "mommy," as "money," an indication of her desire to continue with the show as-is.

Meanwhile, Liz Lemon (Tina Fey) is in an unusually good mood after the holiday break, showing good humor and refusing to overreact to the shenanigans of Tracy Jordan (Tracy Morgan). This alarms all of her coworkers. Tracy decides to investigate. He observes her picking up unspecified pills from a man on the street near Penn Station. He concludes that she is a "crack whore" and takes his evidence to Jack. Jack and Tracy discover that Liz is dancing for the Timeless Torches WNBA dance team. Jack confronts her after a performance and gloats over his complete knowledge of Liz. He then drops her off at a movie theater. Before departing, Jack secretly observes her meeting up with a man that she is evidently in a secret relationship with.

Finally, Kenneth Parcell (Jack McBrayer) spends the day doing all the chores around the office that he had always fantasized about doing, as his pastor predicted the Rapture would occur the next day. The TGS writers are highly amused and tease him mercilessly, even playing along and pretending to have seen signs of the rapture's approach. However, when the rapture doesn't occur, Kenneth is disappointed. Therefore, the writers take pity on him (at first unsuccessfully trying to convince him that the Rapture is actually happening). Later on, they take him to Coney Island to see the ocean, which he had admitted to never seeing before.

== Reception ==
According to the Nielsen Media Research, this episode of 30 Rock was watched by 4.47 million households in its original American broadcast. It earned a 1.8 rating/5 share in the 18–49 demographic. This means that it was seen by 1.8 percent of all 18- to 49-year-olds, and 5 percent of all 18- to 49-year-olds watching television at the time of the broadcast. This was a decrease from the previous season premiere (5.85 million), but an increase from the previous episode, the fifth season finale (4.20 million).

The episode received mostly positive reviews from critics. Nathan Rabin, writing for The A.V. Club, gave the episode a B+ grade and opined that "If the writers-razzing-Kenneth plot felt groaningly familiar it was refreshing to see how Jack’s new conscience as a father complicates his shark-like instincts and the sequence at the WNBA radiated a weird kind of nerdy, unabashed joy". Rabin complimented the direction for Liz and concluded "there’s a whole lot of life—or at least one more really solid season—left in these characters after all."

Kevin Fitzpatrick of TV Over Mind also commented favourably, commenting "while its humor remains as sharp as ever, 30 Rock can acknowledge its aging formula, and even grow into new status quo organically" but wondered where the series would go hereafter." James Poniewozik for Time commented favourably on the direction the writers had taken Liz in, noting that "it makes sense that a woman who’s had success in her career and has dated guys who look like Matt Damon and Jon Hamm would be able to move past neurotic self-flagellation and enjoy what objectively looks like a pretty sweet (if demanding) life", though he commented that he expected the storyline to be discarded shortly.

Kaili Markley of The Game Effect opined that the episode had been "pulling all the stops. There was literally a hilarious line at least once every 30 seconds, and the episode had all of the classic elements that have always made 30 Rock work so well: sharp writing, hilarious jokes, Tracy and Jenna drama, the intricacies of the Jack-Liz dynamic, Liz Lemon weirdness, and Kenneth being Kenneth". She gave it an 8.7 out of 10.
