= Boris Becker career statistics =

Career finals
Discipline	Type	Won	Lost	Total	WR
Singles	Grand Slam	6	4	10	0.60
Singles	Year-end championships	4	6	10	0.40
Singles	ATP Masters 1000*	13	8	21	0.62
Singles	Summer Olympics	–	–	–	–
Singles	ATP Tour	26	10	35	0.72
Singles	Total	49	28	77	0.64
Doubles	Grand Slam	–	–	–	–
Doubles	Year-end championships	–	–	–	–
Doubles	ATP Masters 1000*	4	7	11	0.36
Doubles	Summer Olympics	1	0	1	1.00
Doubles	ATP Tour	10	5	15	0.67
Doubles	Total	15	12	27	0.56
Total		64	40	104	0.62
1) WR = winning rate 2) * formerly "Super 9" (1996–1999), "Tennis Masters Series" (2000–2003) or "ATP Masters Series" (2004–2008).

This is a list of the main career statistics of professional tennis player Boris Becker.

== Performance timelines ==
Key
W	F	SF	QF	#R	RR	Q#	DNQ	A	NH

(W) winner; (F) finalist; (SF) semifinalist; (QF) quarterfinalist; (#R) rounds 4, 3, 2, 1; (RR) round-robin stage; (Q#) qualification round; (DNQ) did not qualify; (A) absent; (NH) not held; (SR) strike rate (events won / competed); (W–L) win–loss record.

=== Singles ===
	West Germany								Germany											
Tournament	1983	1984	1985	1986	1987	1988	1989	1990	1991	1992	1993	1994	1995	1996	1997	1998	1999	SR	W–L	Win %
Grand Slam tournaments
Australian Open	A	QF	2R	NH	4R	A	4R	QF	W	3R	1R	A	1R	W	1R	A	A	2 / 11	29–9	76%
French Open	A	A	2R	QF	SF	4R	SF	1R	SF	A	2R	A	3R	A	A	A	A	0 / 9	26–9	74%
Wimbledon	A	3R	W	W	2R	F	W	F	F	QF	SF	SF	F	3R	QF	A	4R	3 / 15	71–12	86%
US Open	A	A	4R	SF	4R	2R	W	SF	3R	4R	4R	1R	SF	A	A	A	A	1 / 11	37–10	79%
Win–loss	0–0	6–2	11–3	16–2	11–4	10–3	22–2	15–4	20–3	9–3	9–4	5–2	13–4	9–1	4–2	0–0	3–1	6 / 46	163–40	80%
Year-end championships
Tennis Masters Cup	DNQ		F	F	RR	W	F	SF	RR	W	DNQ	F	W	F	did not qualify			3 / 11	36–13	73%
WCT Finals	did not qualify			F	A	W	A	discontinued										1 / 2	5–1	83%
National representation
Summer Olympics	not held					A	not held			3R	not held			A	not held			0 / 1	2–1	67%
Davis Cup	A	A	F	1R	1R	W	W	A	SF	1R	A	A	SF	QF	PO	QF	1R	2 / 12	38–3	93%
Grand Prix								ATP Super 9												
Indian Wells	A	A	A	QF	W	W	3R	SF	A	A	A	A	SF	2R	A	A	A	2 / 7	19–5	79%
Miami	A	A	2R	3R	1R	A	A	3R	3R	4R	3R	3R	A	A	A	A	2R	0 / 9	9–7	56%
Monte Carlo	A	A	2R	A	2R	2R	F	QF	F	3R	2R	A	F	3R	1R	QF	2R	0 / 13	21–12	64%
Hamburg	A	2R	A	2R	A	SF	SF	F	A	SF	3R	2R	2R	3R	3R	1R	A	0 / 12	16–12	57%
Rome	A	A	SF	QF	A	1R	A	A	A	A	3R	F	A	A	3R	A	A	0 / 6	15–6	71%
Canada	A	A	A	W	SF	A	A	A	A	A	3R	A	A	A	A	A	A	1 / 3	9–2	82%
Cincinnati	A	A	W	A	F	A	SF	A	SF	A	A	3R	2R	A	A	A	A	1 / 6	19–5	79%
Tokyo	A	A	SF	W	QF	W	A	ATP Championship Series						not held				2 / 4	15–2	88%
Stockholm	A	A	A	A	A	W	3R	W	W	QF	3R	W	ATP World Series					4 / 7	24–3	89%
Stuttgart (Note: 1995 held in Essen)	not held					exho.		ATP Championship Series					3R	W	2R	3R	A	1 / 4	9–3	75%
Paris	not held			W	A	A	W	F	2R	W	QF	QF	F	2R	2R	1R	A	3 / 11	29–7	81%
Win–loss	0–0	1–1	15–4	22–4	15–4	18–3	17–5	19–5	14–3	13–4	7–6	13–5	12–6	7–4	5–5	5–4	2–1	14 / 82	185–64	74%
Career statistics
	1983	1984	1985	1986	1987	1988	1989	1990	1991	1992	1993	1994	1995	1996	1997	1998	1999	Career		
Titles	0	0	3	6	3	7	5	5	2	5	2	4	2	5	0	0	0	49		
Finals	0	0	5	9	4	8	7	10	5	5	3	7	6	6	0	1	1	77		
Hard win–loss	0–0	1–3	12–3	24–4	22–5	17–2	15–3	25–5	17–5	17–4	13–6	19–6	15–6	9–3	4–3	4–3	5–3	219–64		77%
Clay win–loss	0–0	2–3	11–5	12–4	10–4	7–4	15–3	10–5	10–3	7–5	5–6	4–2	7–4	5–5	4–3	10–4	1–1	120–61		66%
Grass win–loss	0–0	6–3	13–1	10–1	9–2	12–1	7–0	10–2	6–1	4–2	7–2	5–2	9–2	7–1	7–2	0–1	4–2	116–25		82%
Carpet win–loss	0–1	2–2	21–10	23–4	12–4	20–2	27–2	26–3	17–3	24–4	16–6	21–7	23–6	21–5	4–3	1–2	0–0	258–64		80%
Overall win–loss	0–1	11–11	57–19	69–13	53–15	56–9	64–8	71–15	50–12	52–15	41–20	49–17	54–18	42–14	19–11	15–10	10–6	713–214		
Win %	0%	50%	75%	84%	78%	86%	89%	83%	81%	78%	67%	74%	75%	75%	63%	60%	63%	77%		
Year-end ranking	563	66	6	2	5	4	2	2	3	5	11	3	4	6	62	69	131			

=== Doubles ===
Tournament	1984	1985	1986	1987	1988	1989	1990	1991	1992	1993	1994	1995	1996	1997	1998	1999	2001	SR	W–L
Grand Slam tournaments
Australian Open	2R	QF	NH	2R	A	2R	A	3R	1R	A	A	A	A	A	A	A	A	0 / 6	7–6
French Open	1R	A	A	A	A	A	A	A	A	A	A	A	A	A	A	A	A	0 / 1	0–1
Wimbledon	1R	2R	A	A	A	A	A	A	A	A	A	A	A	A	A	A	A	0 / 2	1–1
US Open	A	2R	A	A	A	A	A	A	A	A	A	A	A	A	A	A	A	0 / 1	1–1
Win–loss	1–3	4–2	0–0	1–1	0–0	1–1	0–0	2–1	1–1	0–0	0–0	0–0	0–0	0–0	0–0	0–0	0–0	0 / 10	9–9
National representation
Summer Olympics	not held				A	not held			G	not held			A	not held				1 / 1	4–0
Davis Cup	A	F	1R	1R	W	W	A	SF	1R	A	A	SF	QF	PO	QF	1R	A	2 / 12	16–9
Grand Prix							ATP Super 9												
Indian Wells	A	A	SF	F	W	W	W	A	A	A	A	QF	A	A	A	A	A	3 / 6	22–3
Miami	A	A	SF	A	A	A	F	3R	3R	1R	2R	A	A	A	A	F	A	0 / 7	18–7
Monte Carlo	A	1R	A	QF	A	QF	A	2R	W	A	A	SF	2R	A	A	A	A	1 / 7	12–6
Hamburg	QF	A	F	A	QF	F	A	A	A	A	A	A	A	2R	1R	A	A	0 / 6	12–6
Rome	A	QF	QF	1R	A	A	A	A	A	A	1R	A	A	A	A	A	A	0 / 4	4–3
Canada	A	A	F	QF	A	A	A	A	A	2R	A	A	A	A	A	A	A	0 / 3	5–3
Cincinnati	A	A	A	A	A	A	A	1R	A	A	A	1R	A	A	A	A	1R	0 / 3	0–3
Tokyo	A	QF	QF	QF	F	A	ATP Championship Series						not held					0 / 4	6–3
Stockholm	A	A	A	A	SF	1R	A	1R	A	1R	1R	ATP World Series						0 / 4	3–4
Stuttgart	not held				exho.		ATP Championship Series					QF	A	2R	1R	A	A	0 / 3	3–2
Paris	not held		A	A	A	1R	1R	A	1R	A	2R	A	A	A	A	A	A	0 / 4	1–4
Career statistics
	1984	1985	1986	1987	1988	1989	1990	1991	1992	1993	1994	1995	1996	1997	1998	1999	2001	Career	
Titles	1	0	2	3	2	1	1	0	3	1	0	1	0	0	0	0	0	15	
Finals	1	1	5	5	3	2	2	1	3	1	1	1	0	0	0	1	0	27	
Year-end ranking	67	35	13	16	26	39	28	90	80	84	153	84	227	463	208	178	1292		

== Grand Slam finals ==
=== Singles: 10 (6–4) ===
Result	Year	Championship	Surface	Opponent	Score
Win	1985	Wimbledon	Grass	(United States) Kevin Curren	6–3, 6–7^{(4–7)}, 7–6^{(7–3)}, 6–4
Win	1986	Wimbledon (2)	Grass	(Czechoslovakia) Ivan Lendl	6–4, 6–3, 7–5
Loss	1988	Wimbledon	Grass	(Sweden) Stefan Edberg	6–4, 6–7^{(2–7)}, 4–6, 2–6
Win	1989	Wimbledon (3)	Grass	(Sweden) Stefan Edberg	6–0, 7–6^{(7–1)}, 6–4
Win	1989	US Open	Hard	(Czechoslovakia) Ivan Lendl	7–6^{(7–2)}, 1–6, 6–3, 7–6^{(7–4)}
Loss	1990	Wimbledon	Grass	(Sweden) Stefan Edberg	2–6, 2–6, 6–3, 6–3, 4–6
Win	1991	Australian Open	Hard	(Czechoslovakia) Ivan Lendl	1–6, 6–4, 6–4, 6–4
Loss	1991	Wimbledon	Grass	(Germany) Michael Stich	4–6, 6–7^{(4–7)}, 4–6
Loss	1995	Wimbledon	Grass	(United States) Pete Sampras	7–6^{(7–5)}, 2–6, 4–6, 2–6
Win	1996	Australian Open (2)	Hard	(United States) Michael Chang	6–2, 6–4, 2–6, 6–2

== Grand Prix / ATP year-end championships finals ==
=== Singles: 8 (3–5) ===
Result	Year	Championship	Surface	Opponent	Score
Loss	1985	Grand Prix Masters	Carpet (i)	(Czechoslovakia) Ivan Lendl	2–6, 6–7^{(1–7)}, 3–6
Loss	1986	Grand Prix Masters	Carpet (i)	(Czechoslovakia) Ivan Lendl	4–6, 4–6, 4–6
Win	1988	Grand Prix Masters	Carpet (i)	(Czechoslovakia) Ivan Lendl	5–7, 7–6^{(7–5)}, 3–6, 6–2, 7–6^{(7–5)}
Loss	1989	Grand Prix Masters	Carpet (i)	(Sweden) Stefan Edberg	6–4, 6–7^{(6–8)}, 3–6, 1–6
Win	1992	ATP Tour World Championships	Carpet (i)	(United States) Jim Courier	6–4, 6–3, 7–5
Loss	1994	ATP Tour World Championships	Carpet (i)	(United States) Pete Sampras	6–4, 3–6, 5–7, 4–6
Win	1995	ATP Tour World Championships	Carpet (i)	(United States) Michael Chang	7–6^{(7–3)}, 6–0, 7–6^{(7–5)}
Loss	1996	ATP Tour World Championships	Carpet (i)	(United States) Pete Sampras	6–3, 6–7^{(5–7)}, 6–7^{(4–7)}, 7–6^{(13–11)}, 4–6

== WCT year-end championships ==
=== Singles: 2 (1–1) ===
Result	Year	Championship	Surface	Opponent	Score
Loss	1986	WCT Finals	Carpet (i)	(Sweden) Anders Järryd	7–6^{(7–3)}, 1–6, 1–6, 4–6
Win	1988	WCT Finals	Carpet (i)	(Sweden) Stefan Edberg	6–4, 1–6, 7–5, 6–2

== Grand Slam Cup ==
=== Singles: 1 (1–0) ===
Result	Year	Championship	Surface	Opponent	Score
Win	1996	Grand Slam Cup	Carpet (i)	(Croatia) Goran Ivanišević	6–3, 6–4, 6–4

== Grand Prix Super Series / ATP Super 9 finals ==
=== Singles: 21 (13–8) ===
Result	Year	Tournament	Surface	Opponent	Score
Win	1985	Cincinnati Masters	Hard	(Sweden) Mats Wilander	6–4, 6–2
Win	1986	Canadian Open	Hard	(Sweden) Stefan Edberg	6–4, 3–6, 6–3
Win	1986	Tokyo Indoor	Carpet (i)	(Sweden) Stefan Edberg	7–6^{(7–5)}, 6–1
Win	1987	Indian Wells Masters	Hard	(Sweden) Stefan Edberg	6–4, 6–4, 7–5
Loss	1987	Cincinnati Masters	Hard	(Sweden) Stefan Edberg	4–6, 1–6
Win	1988	Tokyo Indoor (2)	Carpet (i)	(Australia) John Fitzgerald	7–6^{(7–4)}, 6–4
Win	1988	Stockholm Open	Hard (i)	(Sweden) Peter Lundgren	6–4, 6–1, 6–1
Win	1988	Indian Wells Masters (2)	Hard	(Spain) Emilio Sánchez	7–5, 6–4, 2–6, 6–4
Loss	1989	Monte-Carlo Masters	Clay	(Argentina) Alberto Mancini	5–7, 6–2, 6–7^{(4–7)}, 5–7
Win	1989	Paris Masters	Carpet (i)	(Sweden) Stefan Edberg	6–4, 6–3, 6–3
Loss	1990	German Open	Clay	(Spain) Juan Aguilera	1–6, 0–6, 6–7^{(7–9)}
Win	1990	Stockholm Open (2)	Carpet (i)	(Sweden) Stefan Edberg	6–4, 6–0, 6–3
Loss	1990	Paris Masters	Carpet (i)	(Sweden) Stefan Edberg	3–3, ret.
Loss	1991	Monte-Carlo Masters	Clay	(Spain) Sergi Bruguera	7–5, 4–6, 6–7^{(6–8)}, 6–7^{(4–7)}
Win	1991	Stockholm Open (3)	Carpet (i)	(Sweden) Stefan Edberg	3–6, 6–4, 1–6, 6–2, 6–2
Win	1992	Paris Masters	Carpet (i)	(France) Guy Forget	7–6^{(7–3)}, 6–3, 3–6, 6–3
Loss	1994	Italian Open	Clay	(United States) Pete Sampras	1–6, 2–6, 2–6
Win	1994	Stockholm Open (4)	Carpet (i)	(Croatia) Goran Ivanišević	4–6, 6–4, 6–3, 7–6^{(7–4)}
Loss	1995	Monte-Carlo Masters	Clay	(Austria) Thomas Muster	6–4, 7–5, 1–6, 6–7^{(6–8)}, 0–6
Loss	1995	Paris Masters	Carpet (i)	(United States) Pete Sampras	6–7^{(5–7)}, 4–6, 4–6
Win	1996	Eurocard Open	Carpet (i)	(United States) Pete Sampras	3–6, 6–3, 3–6, 6–3, 6–4

- Note: before the ATP took over running the men's professional tour in 1990 the Grand Prix Tour had a series of events that were precursors to the Masters Series known as the Grand Prix Super Series.

== Olympic finals ==
=== Doubles: 1 (1–0) ===
Result	Year	Location	Surface	Partner	Opponents	Score
Gold	1992	Barcelona	Clay	(Germany) Michael Stich	(South Africa) Wayne Ferreira (South Africa) Piet Norval	7–6^{(7–5)}, 4–6, 7–6^{(7–5)}, 6–3

== Career finals ==
=== Singles: 77 (49 titles, 28 runner-ups) ===
Legend Grand Slam tournaments (6–4) Year-end championships – Grand Prix / ATP (3–5) Year-end championships – WCT (1–1) Grand Slam Cup (1–0) Grand Prix Super Series / ATP Super 9 (13–8) ATP Championship Series (9–5) Grand Prix Regular Series / ATP World Series (16–5)	Finals by surface Hard (16–6) Grass (7–5) Clay (0–6) Carpet (26–11)

Result	W–L	Date	Tournament	Surface	Opponent	Score
Win	1–0	Jun 1985	Queen's Club, UK	Grass	(South Africa) Johan Kriek	6–2, 6–3
Win	2–0	Jul 1985	Wimbledon, London, UK	Grass	(South Africa) Kevin Curren	6–3, 6–7^{(4–7)}, 7–6^{(7–3)}, 6–4
Win	3–0	Aug 1985	Cincinnati, US	Hard	(Sweden) Mats Wilander	6–4, 6–2
Loss	3–1	Nov 1985	Wembley, UK	Carpet (i)	(Czech Republic) Ivan Lendl	7–6^{(8–6)}, 3–6, 6–4, 4–6, 4–6
Loss	3–2	Jan 1986	Grand Prix Masters, New York, US	Carpet (i)	(Czech Republic) Ivan Lendl	2–6, 6–7^{(1–7)}, 3–6
Win	4–2	Mar 1986	Chicago, US	Carpet (i)	(Czechoslovakia) Ivan Lendl	7–6^{(7–5)}, 6–3
Loss	4–3	Apr 1986	WCT Finals, Dallas, US	Carpet (i)	(Sweden) Anders Järryd	7–6^{(7–3)}, 1–6, 1–6, 4–6
Win	5–3	Jul 1986	Wimbledon, London, UK	Grass	(Czechoslovakia) Ivan Lendl	6–4, 6–3, 7–5
Loss	5–4	Aug 1986	Stratton Mountain, US	Hard	(Czech Republic) Ivan Lendl	4–6, 6–7^{(0–7)}
Win	6–4	Aug 1986	Canada, Canada	Hard	(Sweden) Stefan Edberg	6–4, 3–6, 6–3
Win	7–4	Oct 1986	Sydney, Australia	Hard (i)	(Czechoslovakia) Ivan Lendl	3–6, 7–6^{(7–2)}, 6–2, 6–0
Win	8–4	Oct 1986	Tokyo, Japan	Carpet (i)	(Sweden) Stefan Edberg	7–6^{(7–5)}, 6–1
Win	9–4	Nov 1986	Paris, France	Carpet (i)	(Spain) Sergio Casal	6–4, 6–3, 7–6^{(7–3)}
Loss	9–5	Dec 1986	Grand Prix Masters, New York, US	Carpet (i)	(Czech Republic) Ivan Lendl	4–6, 4–6, 4–6
Win	10–5	Feb 1987	Indian Wells, US	Hard	(Sweden) Stefan Edberg	6–4, 6–4, 7–5
Win	11–5	Apr 1987	Milan, Italy	Carpet (i)	(Czechoslovakia) Miloslav Mečíř	6–4, 6–3
Win	12–5	Jun 1987	Queen's Club, UK	Grass	(United States) Jimmy Connors	6–7^{(3–7)}, 6–3, 6–4
Loss	12–6	Aug 1987	Cincinnati, US	Hard	(Sweden) Stefan Edberg	4–6, 1–6
Win	13–6	Mar 1988	Indian Wells, US	Hard	(Spain) Emilio Sánchez	7–5, 6–4, 2–6, 6–4
Win	14–6	Apr 1988	WCT Finals, Dallas, US	Carpet (i)	(Sweden) Stefan Edberg	6–4, 1–6, 7–5, 6–2
Win	15–6	Jun 1988	Queen's Club, UK	Grass	(Sweden) Stefan Edberg	6–1, 3–6, 6–3
Loss	15–7	Jul 1988	Wimbledon, London, UK	Grass	(Sweden) Stefan Edberg	6–4, 6–7^{(2–7)}, 4–6, 2–6
Win	16–7	Aug 1988	Indianapolis, US	Hard	(United States) John McEnroe	6–4, 6–2
Win	17–7	Oct 1988	Tokyo, Japan	Carpet (i)	(Australia) John Fitzgerald	7–6^{(7–4)}, 6–4
Win	18–7	Nov 1988	Stockholm, Sweden	Hard (i)	(Sweden) Peter Lundgren	6–4, 6–1, 6–1
Win	19–7	Dec 1988	Grand Prix Masters, New York, US	Carpet (i)	(Czechoslovakia) Ivan Lendl	5–7, 7–6^{(7–5)}, 3–6, 6–2, 7–6^{(7–5)}
Win	20–7	Feb 1989	Milan, Italy	Carpet (i)	(Soviet Union) Alexander Volkov	6–1, 6–2
Win	21–7	Feb 1989	Philadelphia, US	Carpet (i)	(United States) Tim Mayotte	7–6^{(7–4)}, 6–1, 6–3
Loss	21–8	Apr 1989	Monte Carlo, Monaco	Clay	(Argentina) Alberto Mancini	5–7, 6–2, 6–7^{(4–7)}, 5–7
Win	22–8	Jul 1989	Wimbledon, London, UK	Grass	(Sweden) Stefan Edberg	6–0, 7–6^{(7–1)}, 6–4
Win	23–8	Sep 1989	US Open, New York, US	Hard	(Czechoslovakia) Ivan Lendl	7–6^{(7–2)}, 1–6, 6–3, 7–6^{(7–4)}
Win	24–8	Nov 1989	Paris, France	Carpet (i)	(Sweden) Stefan Edberg	6–4, 6–3, 6–3
Loss	24–9	Dec 1989	Grand Prix Masters, New York, US	Carpet (i)	(Sweden) Stefan Edberg	6–4, 6–7^{(6–8)}, 3–6, 1–6
Win	25–9	Feb 1990	Brussels, Belgium	Carpet (i)	(West Germany) Carl-Uwe Steeb	7–5, 6–2, 6–2
Win	26–9	Feb 1990	Stuttgart, West Germany	Carpet (i)	(Czechoslovakia) Ivan Lendl	6–2, 6–2
Loss	26–10	May 1990	Hamburg, West Germany	Clay	(Spain) Juan Aguilera	1–6, 0–6, 6–7^{(7–9)}
Loss	26–11	Jun 1990	Queen's Club, UK	Grass	(Czech Republic) Ivan Lendl	3–6, 2–6
Loss	26–12	Jul 1990	Wimbledon, London, UK	Grass	(Sweden) Stefan Edberg	2–6, 2–6, 6–3, 6–3, 4–6
Win	27–12	Aug 1990	Indianapolis, US	Hard	(Sweden) Peter Lundgren	6–3, 6–4
Win	28–12	Oct 1990	Sydney, Australia	Hard (i)	(Sweden) Stefan Edberg	7–6^{(7–4)}, 6–4, 6–4
Loss	28–13	Oct 1990	Tokyo, Japan	Carpet (i)	(Czech Republic) Ivan Lendl	6–4, 3–6, 6–7^{(5–7)}
Win	29–13	Oct 1990	Stockholm, Sweden	Carpet (i)	(Sweden) Stefan Edberg	6–4, 6–0, 6–3
Loss	29–14	Nov 1990	Paris, France	Carpet (i)	(Sweden) Stefan Edberg	3–3, ret.
Win	30–14	Jan 1991	Australian Open, Melbourne, Australia	Hard	(Czechoslovakia) Ivan Lendl	1–6, 6–4, 6–4, 6–4
Loss	30–15	Apr 1991	Monte Carlo, Monaco	Clay	(Spain) Sergi Bruguera	7–5, 4–6, 6–7^{(6–8)}, 6–7^{(4–7)}
Loss	30–16	Jul 1991	Wimbledon, London, UK	Grass	(Germany) Michael Stich	4–6, 6–7^{(4–7)}, 4–6
Loss	30–17	Aug 1991	Indianapolis, US	Hard	(United States) Pete Sampras	6–7^{(2–7)}, 6–3, 3–6
Win	31–17	Oct 1991	Stockholm, Sweden	Carpet (i)	(Sweden) Stefan Edberg	3–6, 6–4, 1–6, 6–2, 6–2
Win	32–17	Feb 1992	Brussels, Belgium	Carpet (i)	(United States) Jim Courier	6–7^{(5–7)}, 2–6, 7–6^{(12–10)}, 7–6^{(7–5)}, 7–5
Win	33–17	Mar 1992	Rotterdam, Netherlands	Carpet (i)	(Russia) Alexander Volkov	7–6^{(11–9)}, 4–6, 6–2
Win	34–17	Oct 1992	Basel, Switzerland	Hard (i)	(Czechoslovakia) Petr Korda	3–6, 6–3, 6–2, 6–4
Win	35–17	Nov 1992	Paris, France	Carpet (i)	(France) Guy Forget	7–6^{(7–3)}, 6–3, 3–6, 6–3
Win	36–17	Nov 1992	ATP Finals, Frankfurt, Germany	Carpet (i)	(United States) Jim Courier	6–4, 6–3, 7–5
Win	37–17	Jan 1993	Doha, Qatar	Hard	(Croatia) Goran Ivanišević	7–6^{(7–4)}, 4–6, 7–5
Win	38–17	Feb 1993	Milan, Italy	Carpet (i)	(Spain) Sergi Bruguera	6–3, 6–3
Loss	38–18	Aug 1993	Indianapolis, US	Hard	(United States) Jim Courier	5–7, 3–6
Win	39–18	Feb 1994	Milan, Italy	Carpet (i)	(Czech Republic) Petr Korda	6–2, 3–6, 6–3
Loss	39–19	May 1994	Rome, Italy	Clay	(United States) Pete Sampras	1–6, 2–6, 2–6
Win	40–19	Aug 1994	Los Angeles, US	Hard	(Australia) Mark Woodforde	6–2, 6–2
Win	41–19	Aug 1994	New Haven, US	Hard	(Switzerland) Marc Rosset	6–3, 7–5
Loss	41–20	Oct 1994	Sydney, Australia	Hard (i)	(Netherlands) Richard Krajicek	6–7^{(5–7)}, 6–7^{(7–9)}, 6–2, 3–6
Win	42–20	Oct 1994	Stockholm, Sweden	Carpet (i)	(Croatia) Goran Ivanišević	4–6, 6–4, 6–3, 7–6^{(7–4)}
Loss	42–21	Nov 1994	ATP Finals, Frankfurt, Germany	Carpet (i)	(United States) Pete Sampras	6–4, 3–6, 5–7, 4–6
Win	43–21	Feb 1995	Marseille, France	Carpet (i)	(Czech Republic) Daniel Vacek	6–7^{(2–7)}, 6–4, 7–5
Loss	43–22	Feb 1995	Milan, Italy	Carpet (i)	(Russia) Yevgeny Kafelnikov	5–7, 7–5, 6–7^{(6–8)}
Loss	43–23	Apr 1995	Monte Carlo, Monaco	Clay	(Austria) Thomas Muster	6–4, 7–5, 1–6, 6–7^{(6–8)}, 0–6
Loss	43–24	Jul 1995	Wimbledon, London, UK	Grass	(United States) Pete Sampras	7–6^{(7–5)}, 2–6, 4–6, 2–6
Loss	43–25	Nov 1995	Paris, France	Carpet (i)	(United States) Pete Sampras	6–7^{(5–7)}, 4–6, 4–6
Win	44–25	Nov 1995	ATP Finals, Frankfurt, Germany	Carpet (i)	(United States) Michael Chang	7–6^{(7–3)}, 6–0, 7–6^{(7–5)}
Win	45–25	Jan 1996	Australian Open, Melbourne, Australia	Hard	(United States) Michael Chang	6–2, 6–4, 2–6, 6–2
Win	46–25	Jun 1996	Queen's Club, UK	Grass	(Sweden) Stefan Edberg	6–4, 7–6^{(7–3)}
Win	47–25	Oct 1996	Vienna, Austria	Carpet (i)	(Netherlands) Jan Siemerink	6–4, 6–7^{(7–9)}, 6–2, 6–3
Win	48–25	Oct 1996	Stuttgart, Germany	Carpet (i)	(United States) Pete Sampras	3–6, 6–3, 3–6, 6–3, 6–4
Loss	48–26	Nov 1996	ATP Finals, Hanover, Germany	Carpet (i)	(United States) Pete Sampras	6–3, 6–7^{(5–7)}, 6–7^{(4–7)}, 7–6^{(13–11)}, 4–6
Win	49–26	Dec 1996	Grand Slam Cup, Munich, Germany	Carpet (i)	(Croatia) Goran Ivanišević	6–3, 6–4, 6–4
Loss	49–27	Jul 1998	Gstaad, Switzerland	Clay	(Spain) Àlex Corretja	6–7^{(5–7)}, 5–7, 3–6
Loss	49–28	Apr 1999	Hong Kong, China	Hard	(United States) Andre Agassi	7–6^{(7–4)}, 4–6, 4–6

=== Doubles: 27 (15 titles, 12 runner-ups) ===
Legend Grand Slam tournaments (0–0) Olympic Games (1–0) Grand Prix Super Series / ATP Super 9 (2–2) ATP Championship Series (2–1) Grand Prix Regular Series / ATP World Series (10–9)	Finals by surface Hard (5–5) Grass (0–0) Clay (3–5) Carpet (7–2)

Result	W–L	Date	Tournament	Surface	Partner	Opponents	Score
Win	1–1	Jun 1984	Munich, Germany	Clay	(Poland) Wojtek Fibak	(United States) Eric Fromm (Romania) Florin Segărceanu	6–4, 4–6, 6–1
Loss	1–1	Nov 1985	Wembley, England	Carpet (i)	(Socialist Federal Republic of Yugoslavia) Slobodan Živojinović	(France) Guy Forget (Sweden) Anders Järryd	5–7, 6–4, 5–7
Win	2–1	Mar 1986	Brussels, Belgium	Carpet (i)	(Socialist Federal Republic of Yugoslavia) Slobodan Živojinović	(Australia) John Fitzgerald (Czech Republic) Tomáš Šmíd	7–6, 7–5
Loss	2–2	May 1986	Forest Hills, US	Clay	(Socialist Federal Republic of Yugoslavia) Slobodan Živojinović	(Chile) Hans Gildemeister (Ecuador) Andrés Gómez	6–7, 6–7
Loss	2–3	Aug 1986	Toronto, Canada	Hard	(Socialist Federal Republic of Yugoslavia) Slobodan Živojinović	(United States) Chip Hooper (United States) Mike Leach	7–6, 3–6, 3–6
Loss	2–4	Sep 1986	Hamburg, Germany	Clay	(Germany) Eric Jelen	(Spain) Sergio Casal (Spain) Emilio Sánchez	4–6, 1–6
Win	3–4	Oct 1986	Sydney, Australia	Hard (i)	(Australia) John Fitzgerald	(Australia) Peter McNamara (Australia) Paul McNamee	6–4, 7–6
Loss	3–5	Feb 1987	Indian Wells, US	Hard	(Germany) Eric Jelen	(France) Guy Forget (France) Yannick Noah	4–6, 6–7
Win	4–5	Mar 1987	Brussels, Belgium	Carpet (i)	(Socialist Federal Republic of Yugoslavia) Slobodan Živojinović	(United States) Chip Hooper (United States) Mike Leach	7–6, 7–6
Win	5–5	Apr 1987	Milan, Italy	Carpet (i)	(Socialist Federal Republic of Yugoslavia) Slobodan Živojinović	(Spain) Sergio Casal (Spain) Emilio Sánchez	3–6, 6–3, 6–4
Loss	5–6	Oct 1988	Tokyo, Japan	Carpet (i)	(Germany) Eric Jelen	(Ecuador) Andrés Gómez (Socialist Federal Republic of Yugoslavia) Slobodan Živojinović	5–7, 7–5, 3–6
Loss	5–7	Oct 1987	Sydney, Australia	Hard (i)	(United States) Robert Seguso	(Australia) Darren Cahill (Australia) Mark Kratzmann	3–6, 2–6
Win	6–7	Nov 1987	Frankfurt, Germany	Carpet (i)	(Germany) Patrik Kühnen	(United States) Scott Davis (United States) David Pate	6–4, 6–2
Win	7–7	Feb 1988	Milan, Italy	Carpet (i)	(Germany) Eric Jelen	(Czech Republic) Miloslav Mečíř (Czech Republic) Tomáš Šmíd	6–3, 6–3
Win	8–7	Mar 1988	Indian Wells, US	Hard	(France) Guy Forget	(Mexico) Jorge Lozano (United States) Todd Witsken	6–4, 6–4
Win	9–7	Mar 1989	Indian Wells, US	Hard	(Switzerland) Jakob Hlasek	(United States) Kevin Curren (United States) David Pate	7–6, 7–5
Loss	9–8	May 1989	Hamburg, Germany	Clay	(Germany) Eric Jelen	(Spain) Emilio Sánchez (Spain) Javier Sánchez	4–6, 1–6
Win	10–8	Mar 1990	Indian Wells, US	Hard	(France) Guy Forget	(United States) Jim Grabb (United States) Patrick McEnroe	4–6, 6–4, 6–3
Loss	10–9	Mar 1990	Key Biscayne, US	Hard	(Brazil) Cássio Motta	(United States) Rick Leach (United States) Jim Pugh	4–6, 6–3, 3–6
Loss	10–10	Apr 1991	Barcelona, Spain	Clay	(Germany) Eric Jelen	(Argentina) Horacio de la Peña (Italy) Diego Nargiso	6–3, 6–7, 4–6
Win	11–10	Feb 1992	Brussels, Belgium	Carpet (i)	(United States) John McEnroe	(France) Guy Forget (Switzerland) Jakob Hlasek	6–3, 6–2
Win	12–10	Apr 1992	Monte Carlo, Monaco	Clay	(Germany) Michael Stich	(Czech Republic) Petr Korda (Czech Republic) Karel Nováček	6–4, 6–4
Win	13–10	Aug 1992	Summer Olympics, Spain	Clay	(Germany) Michael Stich	(South Africa) Wayne Ferreira (South Africa) Piet Norval	7–6, 4–6, 7–6, 6–3
Win	14–10	Jan 1993	Doha, Qatar	Hard	(Germany) Patrik Kühnen	(United States) Shelby Cannon (United States) Scott Melville	6–2, 6–4
Loss	14–11	May 1994	Munich, Germany	Clay	(Czech Republic) Petr Korda	(Russia) Yevgeny Kafelnikov (Czech Republic) David Rikl	6–7, 5–7
Win	15–11	Feb 1995	Milan, Italy	Carpet (i)	(France) Guy Forget	(Czech Republic) Petr Korda (Czech Republic) Karel Nováček	6–2, 6–4
Loss	15–12	Mar 1999	Key Biscayne, US	Hard	(United States) Jan-Michael Gambill	(Zimbabwe) Wayne Black (Australia) Sandon Stolle	1–6, 1–6

=== Team competition: 6 (5 titles, 1 runner-up) ===
Result	No.	Date	Tournament	Surface	Partners	Opponents	Score
Loss	1.	20–22 December 1985	Davis Cup, Munich, West Germany	Carpet (i)	(West Germany) Michael Westphal (West Germany) Andreas Maurer (West Germany) Hans Schwaier	(Sweden) Stefan Edberg (Sweden) Mats Wilander (Sweden) Joakim Nyström (Sweden) Anders Järryd	2–3
Win	1.	16–18 December 1988	Davis Cup, Gothenburg, Sweden	Clay (i)	(West Germany) Eric Jelen (West Germany) Carl-Uwe Steeb (West Germany) Patrik Kühnen	(Sweden) Mats Wilander (Sweden) Stefan Edberg (Sweden) Anders Järryd (Sweden) Kent Carlsson	4–1
Win	2.	28 May 1989	World Team Cup, Düsseldorf, Germany	Clay	(West Germany) Eric Jelen (West Germany) Carl-Uwe Steeb	(Argentina) Guillermo Perez-Roldan (Argentina) Martín Jaite (Argentina) Javier Frana (Argentina) Gustavo Luza	2–1
Win	3.	15–17 December 1989	Davis Cup, Stuttgart, West Germany	Carpet (i)	(West Germany) Eric Jelen (West Germany) Carl-Uwe Steeb (West Germany) Patrik Kühnen	(Sweden) Mats Wilander (Sweden) Stefan Edberg (Sweden) Anders Järryd (Sweden) Jan Gunnarsson	3–2
Win	4.	7 January 1995	Hopman Cup, Perth, Australia	Hard (I)	(Germany) Anke Huber	(Ukraine) Natalia Medvedeva (Ukraine) Andriy Medvedev	2–0
Win	5.	24 May 1998	World Team Cup, Düsseldorf, Germany	Clay	(Germany) Tommy Haas (Germany) Nicolas Kiefer (Germany) David Prinosil	(Czech Republic) Petr Korda (Czech Republic) Ctislav Doseděl (Czech Republic) Daniel Vacek (Czech Republic) Cyril Suk	3–0

== Top 10 wins ==
Becker has a 121–65 record (65.1%) against players who were, at the time the match was played, ranked in the top 10.

Season	1983	1984	1985	1986	1987	1988	1989	1990	1991	1992	1993	1994	1995	1996	1997	1998	1999	Total
Wins	0	0	11	15	7	10	14	12	8	9	3	11	8	8	2	3	0	121

#	Player	Rank	Event	Surface	Rd	Score	BR
1985
1.	(Australia) Pat Cash	7	Queen's Club, London, United Kingdom	Grass	QF	6–4, 6–4	29
2.	(Sweden) Joakim Nyström	8	Wimbledon, London, United Kingdom	Grass	3R	3–6, 7–6, 6–1, 4–6, 9–7	20
3.	(Sweden) Anders Järryd	6	Wimbledon, London, United Kingdom	Grass	SF	2–6, 7–6, 6–3, 6–3	20
4.	(South Africa) Kevin Curren	9	Wimbledon, London, United Kingdom	Grass	F	6–3, 6–7, 7–6, 6–4	20
5.	(Sweden) Mats Wilander	3	Cincinnati, United States	Hard	F	6–4, 6–2	9
6.	(Sweden) Anders Järryd	9	Tokyo, Japan	Carpet (i)	QF	7–6^{(10–8)}, 6–4	5
7.	(Sweden) Anders Järryd	9	Wembley, London, United Kingdom	Carpet (i)	SF	7–6, 7–6	5
8.	(Sweden) Stefan Edberg	5	Davis Cup, Munich, West Germany	Carpet (i)	RR	6–3, 3–6, 7–5, 8–6	6
9.	(Sweden) Mats Wilander	3	Davis Cup, Munich, West Germany	Carpet (i)	RR	6–3, 2–6, 6–3, 6–3	6
10.	(Sweden) Mats Wilander	3	Masters, New York, United States	Carpet (i)	QF	6–4, 4–6, 6–3	6
11.	(Sweden) Anders Järryd	8	Masters, New York, United States	Carpet (i)	SF	6–3, 6–4	6
1986
12.	(United States) Jimmy Connors	4	Chicago, United States	Carpet (i)	SF	7–6, 4–6, 6–4	6
13.	(Czechoslovakia) Ivan Lendl	1	Chicago, United States	Carpet (i)	F	7–6, 6–3	6
14.	(Sweden) Stefan Edberg	6	WCT Finals, Dallas, United States	Carpet (i)	SF	7–6, 7–6, 4–6, 7–6	4
15.	(France) Henri Leconte	9	Wimbledon, London, United Kingdom	Grass	SF	6–2, 6–4, 6–7, 6–3	6
16.	(Czechoslovakia) Ivan Lendl	1	Wimbledon, London, United Kingdom	Grass	F	6–4, 6–3, 7–5	6
17.	(United States) John McEnroe	7	Stratton Mountain, United States	Hard	SF	3–6, 7–5, 7–6	3
18.	(Sweden) Stefan Edberg	6	Montreal, Canada	Hard	F	6–4, 3–6, 6–3	3
19.	(Czechoslovakia) Ivan Lendl	1	Sydney, Australia	Hard (i)	F	3–6, 7–6, 6–2, 6–0	3
20.	(United States) Jimmy Connors	7	Tokyo, Japan	Carpet (i)	SF	7–6, 2–6, 6–3	3
21.	(Sweden) Stefan Edberg	4	Tokyo, Japan	Carpet (i)	F	7–6, 6–1	3
22.	(France) Henri Leconte	7	Paris, France	Carpet (i)	SF	6–2, 3–6, 6–3	2
23.	(Sweden) Mats Wilander	3	Masters, New York, United States	Carpet (i)	RR	6–3, 3–6, 6–3	2
24.	(Sweden) Joakim Nyström	7	Masters, New York, United States	Carpet (i)	RR	6–1, 6–3	2
25.	(France) Henri Leconte	6	Masters, New York, United States	Carpet (i)	RR	0–6, 6–1, 6–1	2
26.	(Sweden) Stefan Edberg	4	Masters, New York, United States	Carpet (i)	SF	6–4, 6–4	2
1987
27.	(France) Yannick Noah	4	Indian Wells, United States	Hard	SF	6–4, 6–2	3
28.	(Sweden) Stefan Edberg	2	Indian Wells, United States	Hard	F	6–4, 6–4, 7–5	3
29.	(Czechoslovakia) Miloslav Mečíř	6	Milan, Italy	Carpet (i)	F	6–4, 6–3	2
30.	(United States) Jimmy Connors	8	French Open, Paris, France	Clay	QF	6–3, 6–3, 7–5	2
31.	(United States) Jimmy Connors	7	Queen's Club, London, United Kingdom	Grass	F	6–7, 6–3, 6–4	2
32.	(United States) John McEnroe	9	Davis Cup, Hartford, United States	Carpet (i)	RR	4–6, 15–13, 8–10, 6–2, 6–2	4
33.	(United States) Jimmy Connors	4	Masters, New York, United States	Carpet (i)	RR	7–5, 2–6, 6–3	5
1988
34.	(United States) Brad Gilbert	10	WCT Finals, Dallas, United States	Carpet (i)	SF	6–4, 6–2, 6–1	4
35.	(Sweden) Stefan Edberg	3	WCT Finals, Dallas, United States	Carpet (i)	F	6–4, 1–6, 7–5, 6–2	4
36.	(Sweden) Stefan Edberg	3	Queen's Club, London, United Kingdom	Grass	F	6–1, 3–6, 6–3	7
37.	(Australia) Pat Cash	4	Wimbledon, London, United Kingdom	Grass	QF	6–4, 6–3, 6–4	8
38.	(Czechoslovakia) Ivan Lendl	1	Wimbledon, London, United Kingdom	Grass	SF	6–4, 6–3, 6–7, 6–4	8
39.	(Sweden) Mats Wilander	1	Masters, New York, United States	Carpet (i)	RR	7–6, 6–7, 6–1	4
40.	(France) Henri Leconte	9	Masters, New York, United States	Carpet (i)	RR	6–0, 1–0, ret.	4
41.	(Switzerland) Jakob Hlasek	8	Masters, New York, United States	Carpet (i)	SF	7–6, 7–6	4
42.	(Czechoslovakia) Ivan Lendl	2	Masters, New York, United States	Carpet (i)	F	5–7, 7–6, 3–6, 6–2, 7–6	4
43.	(Sweden) Stefan Edberg	5	Davis Cup, Gothenburg, Sweden	Clay (i)	RR	6–3, 6–1, 6–4	4
1989
44.	(United States) John McEnroe	9	Milan, Italy	Carpet (i)	SF	6–2, 6–3	4
45.	(United States) Tim Mayotte	9	World Team Cup, Düsseldorf, Germany	Clay	RR	6–4, 6–3	2
46.	(Switzerland) Jakob Hlasek	8	World Team Cup, Düsseldorf, Germany	Clay	RR	6–3, 6–4	2
47.	(Czechoslovakia) Ivan Lendl	1	Wimbledon, London, United Kingdom	Grass	SF	7–5, 6–7, 2–6, 6–4, 6–3	2
48.	(Sweden) Stefan Edberg	3	Wimbledon, London, United Kingdom	Grass	F	6–0, 7–6, 6–4	2
49.	(United States) Andre Agassi	6	Davis Cup, Munich, West Germany	Carpet (i)	RR	6–7, 6–7, 7–6, 6–3, 6–4	2
50.	(Czechoslovakia) Ivan Lendl	1	US Open, New York, United States	Hard	F	7–6, 1–6, 6–3, 7–6	2
51.	(United States) John McEnroe	4	Paris, France	Carpet (i)	SF	7–6, 3–6, 6–3	2
52.	(Sweden) Stefan Edberg	3	Paris, France	Carpet (i)	F	6–4, 6–3, 6–3	2
53.	(United States) Brad Gilbert	6	Masters, New York, United States	Carpet (i)	RR	2–6, 6–3, 6–4	2
54.	(Sweden) Stefan Edberg	3	Masters, New York, United States	Carpet (i)	RR	6–1, 6–4	2
55.	(United States) Andre Agassi	7	Masters, New York, United States	Carpet (i)	RR	6–1, 6–3	2
56.	(United States) John McEnroe	4	Masters, New York, United States	Carpet (i)	SF	6–4, 6–4	2
57.	(Sweden) Stefan Edberg	3	Davis Cup, Stuttgart, West Germany	Carpet (i)	RR	6–2, 6–2, 6–4	2
1990
58.	(Czechoslovakia) Ivan Lendl	1	Stuttgart, Germany	Carpet (i)	F	6–2, 6–2	2
59.	(United States) Jay Berger	10	Indian Wells, United States	Hard	QF	6–1, 6–2	2
60.	(United States) Brad Gilbert	4	World Team Cup, Düsseldorf, Germany	Clay	RR	6–1, 6–1	3
61.	(Sweden) Stefan Edberg	3	Queen's Club, London, United Kingdom	Grass	SF	6–4, 6–4	2
62.	(United States) Brad Gilbert	6	Wimbledon, London, United Kingdom	Grass	QF	6–4, 6–4, 6–1	2
63.	(United States) Aaron Krickstein	9	US Open, New York, United States	Hard	QF	3–6, 6–3, 6–2, 6–3	2
64.	(Sweden) Stefan Edberg	1	Sydney, Australia	Hard (i)	F	7–6, 6–4, 6–4	2
65.	(United States) Pete Sampras	5	Stockholm, Sweden	Carpet (i)	SF	6–4, 6–4	2
66.	(Sweden) Stefan Edberg	1	Stockholm, Sweden	Carpet (i)	F	6–4, 6–0, 6–3	2
67.	(Ecuador) Andrés Gómez	6	ATP Tour World Championships, Frankfurt, Germany	Carpet (i)	RR	4–6, 6–3, 6–3	2
68.	(Austria) Thomas Muster	7	ATP Tour World Championships, Frankfurt, Germany	Carpet (i)	RR	7–5, 6–4	2
69.	(Czechoslovakia) Ivan Lendl	3	ATP Tour World Championships, Frankfurt, Germany	Carpet (i)	RR	1–6, 7–6, 6–4	2
1991
70.	(Czechoslovakia) Ivan Lendl	3	Australian Open, Melbourne	Hard	F	1–6, 6–4, 6–4, 6–4	2
71.	(United States) Michael Chang	10	French Open, Paris	Clay	QF	6–4, 6–4, 6–2	2
72.	(France) Guy Forget	8	Wimbledon, London, United Kingdom	Grass	QF	6–7^{(5–7)}, 7–6^{(7–3)}, 6–2, 7–6^{(9–7)}	2
73.	(United States) Pete Sampras	7	Stockholm, Sweden	Carpet (i)	QF	7–5, 7–5	2
74.	(United States) Jim Courier	3	Stockholm, Sweden	Carpet (i)	SF	6–7^{(4–7)}, 6–3, 6–4	2
75.	(Sweden) Stefan Edberg	1	Stockholm, Sweden	Carpet (i)	F	3–6, 6–4, 1–6, 6–2, 6–2	2
76.	(Germany) Michael Stich	4	ATP Tour World Championships, Frankfurt, Germany	Carpet (i)	RR	7–6^{(7–1)}, 6–3	3
77.	(United States) Pete Sampras	7	ATP Tour World Championships, Frankfurt, Germany	Carpet (i)	RR	6–4, 6–7^{(3–7)}, 6–1	3
1992
78.	(Sweden) Stefan Edberg	2	Brussels, Belgium	Carpet (i)	SF	4–6, 6–4, 6–2	5
79.	(United States) Jim Courier	1	Brussels, Belgium	Carpet (i)	F	6–7^{(5–7)}, 2–6, 7–6^{(12–10)}, 7–6^{(7–5)}, 7–5	5
80.	(Czechoslovakia) Petr Korda	7	Basel, Switzerland	Hard (i)	F	3–6, 6–3, 6–2, 6–4	8
81.	(United States) Jim Courier	1	Paris, France	Carpet (i)	QF	7–6^{(7–5)}, 6–3	9
82.	(Croatia) Goran Ivanišević	4	Paris, France	Carpet (i)	SF	6–1, 6–2	9
83.	(Czechoslovakia) Petr Korda	6	ATP Tour World Championships, Frankfurt, Germany	Carpet (i)	RR	6–4, 6–2	7
84.	(Sweden) Stefan Edberg	2	ATP Tour World Championships, Frankfurt, Germany	Carpet (i)	RR	6–4, 6–0	7
85.	(Croatia) Goran Ivanišević	4	ATP Tour World Championships, Frankfurt, Germany	Carpet (i)	SF	4–6, 6–4, 7–6^{(9–7)}	7
86.	(United States) Jim Courier	1	ATP Tour World Championships, Frankfurt, Germany	Carpet (i)	F	6–4, 6–3, 7–5	7
1993
87.	(Sweden) Stefan Edberg	2	Doha, Qatar	Hard	SF	6–4, 6–4	5
88.	(Croatia) Goran Ivanišević	4	Doha, Qatar	Hard	F	7–6^{(7–4)}, 4–6, 7–5	5
89.	(Germany) Michael Stich	8	Wimbledon, London, United Kingdom	Grass	QF	7–5, 6–7^{(5–7)}, 6–7^{(5–7)}, 6–2, 6–4	4
1994
90.	(Germany) Michael Stich	2	Stuttgart, Germany	Carpet (i)	QF	6–3, 7–6^{(7–4)}	14
91.	(Croatia) Goran Ivanišević	6	Rome, Italy	Clay	SF	6–2, 7–6^{(7–5)}	13
92.	(Ukraine) Andriy Medvedev	6	Wimbledon, London, United Kingdom	Grass	4R	6–7^{(5–7)}, 7–5, 7–6^{(7–3)}, 6–7^{(3–7)}, 7–5	10
93.	(Germany) Michael Stich	5	New Haven, United States	Hard	SF	6–2, 7–5	8
94.	(Germany) Michael Stich	3	Stockholm, Sweden	Carpet (i)	QF	7–6^{(7–3)}, 6–3	6
95.	(United States) Pete Sampras	1	Stockholm, Sweden	Carpet (i)	SF	6–4, 6–4	6
96.	(Croatia) Goran Ivanišević	2	Stockholm, Sweden	Carpet (i)	F	4–6, 6–4, 6–3, 7–6^{(7–4)}	6
97.	(Croatia) Goran Ivanišević	4	ATP Tour World Championships, Frankfurt, Germany	Carpet (i)	RR	6–3, 3–6, 7–6^{(7–5)}	5
98.	(United States) Pete Sampras	1	ATP Tour World Championships, Frankfurt, Germany	Carpet (i)	RR	7–5, 7–5	5
99.	(Sweden) Stefan Edberg	8	ATP Tour World Championships, Frankfurt, Germany	Carpet (i)	RR	6–7^{(3–7)}, 6–4, 7–5	5
100.	(Spain) Sergi Bruguera	3	ATP Tour World Championships, Frankfurt, Germany	Carpet (i)	SF	6–7^{(5–7)}, 6–4, 6–1	5
1995
101.	(Russia) Yevgeny Kafelnikov	8	Stuttgart, Germany	Carpet (i)	QF	7–6^{(7–4)}, 7–6^{(7–1)}	3
102.	(Netherlands) Richard Krajicek	10	Davis Cup, Utrecht, Netherlands	Hard (i)	RR	6–3, 6–4, 3–6, 6–1	3
103.	(Croatia) Goran Ivanišević	7	Monte Carlo, Monaco	Clay	SF	7–6^{(11–9)}, 3–6, 6–1	3
104.	(United States) Andre Agassi	1	Wimbledon, London, United Kingdom	Grass	SF	2–6, 7–6^{(7–1)}, 6–4, 7–6^{(7–1)}	4
105.	(South Africa) Wayne Ferreira	9	ATP Tour World Championships, Frankfurt, Germany	Carpet (i)	RR	4–6, 6–2, 7–6^{(7–5)}	5
106.	(Russia) Yevgeny Kafelnikov	6	ATP Tour World Championships, Frankfurt, Germany	Carpet (i)	RR	6–4, 7–5	5
107.	(Sweden) Thomas Enqvist	8	ATP Tour World Championships, Frankfurt, Germany	Carpet (i)	SF	6–4, 6–7^{(5–7)}, 7–5	5
108.	(United States) Michael Chang	4	ATP Tour World Championships, Frankfurt, Germany	Carpet (i)	F	7–6^{(7–3)}, 6–0, 7–6^{(7–5)}	5
1996
109.	(Russia) Yevgeny Kafelnikov	6	Australian Open, Melbourne	Hard	QF	6–4, 7–6^{(11–9)}, 6–1	4
110.	(United States) Michael Chang	5	Australian Open, Melbourne	Hard	F	6–2, 6–4, 2–6, 6–2	4
111.	(United States) Michael Chang	2	Stuttgart, Germany	Carpet (i)	SF	6–4, 6–3	6
112.	(United States) Pete Sampras	1	Stuttgart, Germany	Carpet (i)	F	3–6, 6–3, 3–6, 6–3, 6–4	6
113.	(Russia) Yevgeny Kafelnikov	3	ATP Tour World Championships, Hanover, Germany	Carpet (i)	RR	6–4, 7–5	6
114.	(United States) Pete Sampras	1	ATP Tour World Championships, Hanover, Germany	Carpet (i)	RR	7–6^{(12–10)}, 7–6^{(7–4)}	6
115.	(Netherlands) Richard Krajicek	8	ATP Tour World Championships, Hanover, Germany	Carpet (i)	SF	6–7^{(4–7)}, 7–6^{(7–3)}, 6–3	6
116.	(Croatia) Goran Ivanišević	4	Grand Slam Cup, Munich, Germany	Carpet (i)	F	6–3, 6–4, 6–4	6
1997
117.	(Chile) Marcelo Ríos	10	Wimbledon, London, United Kingdom	Grass	4R	6–2, 6–2, 7–6^{(7–5)}	18
118.	(Spain) Carlos Moyà	9	Stockholm, Sweden	Hard (i)	1R	6–4, 6–3	37
1998
119.	(United Kingdom) Greg Rusedski	5	Monte Carlo, Monaco	Clay	2R	6–4, 3–6, 6–3	66
120.	(Chile) Marcelo Ríos	2	Gstaad, Switzerland	Clay	SF	6–4, 7–6^{(7–4)}	119
121.	(Spain) Carlos Moyà	4	Stuttgart, Germany	Hard (i)	2R	6–7^{(4–7)}, 6–4, 6–4	67

== Record against No. 1 players ==
Becker's match record against players who have been ranked world No. 1.

Player	Years	Matches	Record	Win %	Hard	Clay	Grass	Carpet
(United States) Jimmy Connors	1986–1992	6	6–0	100%	1–0	1–0	1–0	3–0
(Australia) Lleyton Hewitt	1999	1	1–0	100%	0–0	0–0	1–0	0–0
(Romania) Ilie Năstase	1985	1	1–0	100%	0–0	1–0	0–0	0–0
(United States) Jim Courier	1990–1993	7	6–1	86%	1–1	0–0	0–0	5–0
(United States) John McEnroe	1985–1992	10	8–2	80%	2–1	0–0	0–0	6–1
(Sweden) Stefan Edberg	1984–1996	35	25–10	71%	7–3	1–1	4–2	13–4
(Sweden) Mats Wilander	1985–1990	10	7–3	70%	2–1	0–2	0–0	5–0
(Russia) Yevgeny Kafelnikov	1995–1997	6	4–2	67%	1–0	0–0	0–1	3–1
(Austria) Thomas Muster	1988–1995	3	2–1	67%	0–0	1–1	0–0	1–0
(Australia) Patrick Rafter	1993–1999	3	2–1	67%	1–0	0–0	1–1	0–0
(Chile) Marcelo Rios	1995–1998	5	3–2	60%	1–0	1–2	1–0	0–0
(Spain) Carlos Moyá	1996–1998	4	2–2	50%	2–1	0–0	0–0	0–1
(Czech Republic) / (United States) Ivan Lendl	1985–1993	21	10–11	48%	3–3	0–1	3–0	4–7
(United States) Pete Sampras	1990–1997	19	7–12	37%	0–2	0–1	0–3	7–6
(United States) Andre Agassi	1988–1999	14	4–10	29%	1–6	0–1	1–1	2–2
(Russia) Marat Safin	1999	1	0–1	0%	0–1	0–0	0–0	0–0
Total	1984–1999	146	88–58	60%	22–19 (54%)	5–9 (36%)	12–8 (60%)	49–22 (69%)
