= 1987 Volvo Tennis Chicago – Singles =

Singles
- 1987 Volvo Tennis Chicago

Final
- Champion: (United States) Tim Mayotte
- Runner-up: (United States) David Pate
- Score: 6–4, 6–2

Details
- Draw: 32 (3WC/4Q)
- Seeds: 8

Events
Singles	Doubles
← 1986 ·	Chicago Grand Prix	· 1991 →

Boris Becker was the defending champion, but chose to compete at Milan during the same week.

Tim Mayotte won the title by defeating David Pate 6–4, 6–2 in the final.

== Seeds ==
1. (France) Yannick Noah (second round)
2. (United States) Jimmy Connors (quarterfinals)
3. (United States) Tim Mayotte (champion)
4. (United States) Brad Gilbert (second round)
5. (United States) Johan Kriek (second round)
6. (United States) Scott Davis (quarterfinals)
7. (South Africa) Christo van Rensburg (second round)
8. (United States) David Pate (final)

== Draw ==
=== Key ===
- Q = Qualifier
- WC = Wild card
- LL = Lucky loser
- Alt = Alternate
- SE = Special exempt
- PR = Protected ranking
- ITF = ITF entry
- JE = Junior exempt
- w/o = Walkover
- r = Retired
- d = Defaulted
- SR = Special ranking

=== Finals ===
Semifinals
8	(United States) David Pate	6	6
(United States) Bill Scanlon	3	2
3	(United States) Tim Mayotte	3	7	6
WC	(United States) Eliot Teltscher	6	5	2

Final
8	(United States) David Pate	4	2
3	(United States) Tim Mayotte	6	6

=== Top half ===
First round
1/WC	(France) Y Noah	0	7	6
(Sweden) P Lundgren	6	5	4
Q	(South Africa) B Moir	2	6	3
(United States) M Purcell	6	3	6
(United States) J Grabb	3	2
(United States) P Annacone	6	6
(United States) B Pearce	2	4
8	(United States) D Pate	6	6
4	(United States) B Gilbert	6	6
Q	(New Zealand) K Evernden	3	2
WC	(United States) R Leach	3	4
(United States) B Scanlon	6	6
Q	(United States) E Korita	3	4
(United States) S Giammalva Jr.	6	6
(South Africa) C Steyn	3	2
6	(United States) S Davis	6	6

Second round
1/WC	(France) Y Noah	4	2
(United States) M Purcell	6	6
(United States) P Annacone	6	2
8	(United States) D Pate	7	6
4	(United States) B Gilbert	5	4
(United States) B Scanlon	7	6
(United States) S Giammalva Jr.	6	3	2
6	(United States) S Davis	2	6	6

Quarterfinals
(United States) M Purcell	5	4
8	(United States) D Pate	7	6
(United States) B Scanlon	6	6
6	(United States) S Davis	3	3

Semifinals
8	(United States) D Pate	6	6
(United States) B Scanlon	3	2

=== Bottom half ===
First round
5	(United States) J Kriek	6	7
(United States) M Freeman	3	6
Q	(United States) P Fleming	6	7
(South Africa) E Edwards	1	6
(United States) T Nelson	6	6
(United States) G Donnelly	1	4
(United States) D Rostagno	1	1
3	(United States) T Mayotte	6	6
7	(South Africa) C van Rensburg	6	7
(United States) K Jones	3	5
WC	(United States) E Teltscher	6	6
WC	(United States) S DeVries	2	4
(United States) G Layendecker	4	3
(United States) D Goldie	6	6
(United States) T Witsken	7	2	1^{r}
2	(United States) J Connors	6	6	2

Second round
5	(United States) J Kriek	6	4
Q	(United States) P Fleming	7	6
(United States) T Nelson	4	7	3
3	(United States) T Mayotte	6	6	6
7	(South Africa) C van Rensburg	3	2
WC	(United States) E Teltscher	6	6
(United States) D Goldie	1	6	1
2	(United States) J Connors	6	0	6

Quarterfinals
Q	(United States) P Fleming	2	3
3	(United States) T Mayotte	6	6
WC	(United States) E Teltscher	6	6
2	(United States) J Connors	3	1

Semifinals
3	(United States) T Mayotte	3	7	6
WC	(United States) E Teltscher	6	5	2
