= 1987 Volvo Tennis Chicago =

Men's tennis tournament

- Date: March 30 – April 5
- Edition: 3rd
- Category: Grand Prix
- Draw: 32S / 16D
- Prize money: $250,000
- Surface: Carpet / indoor
- Location: Chicago, Illinois, US
- Venue: UIC Pavilion

Champions

Singles
- (United States) Tim Mayotte

Doubles
- (United States) Paul Annacone / (South Africa) Christo van Rensburg
← 1986 ·	Chicago Grand Prix	· 1991 →

The 1987 Volvo Tennis Chicago was a men's tennis tournament played on indoor carpet courts at the UIC Pavilion in Chicago, Illinois in the United States that was part of the 1987 Nabisco Grand Prix. It was the third edition of the tournament and was held from March 30 through April 5, 1987. Third-seeded Tim Mayotte won the singles title.

== Finals ==
=== Singles ===
(United States) Tim Mayotte defeated (United States) David Pate 6–4, 6–2

- It was Mayotte's 2nd singles title of the year and the 4th of his career.

=== Doubles ===
(United States) Paul Annacone / (South Africa) Christo van Rensburg defeated (United States) Mike De Palmer / (United States) Gary Donnelly 6–3, 7–6^{(7–4)}
