= 1988 Tokyo Indoor =

- Date: 18–23 October
- Edition: 11th
- Draw: 32S / 16D
- Prize money: $500,000
- Surface: Carpet / indoor
- Location: Tokyo, Japan
- Venue: Yoyogi National Gymnasium

Champions

Singles
- (West Germany) Boris Becker

Doubles
- (Ecuador) Andrés Gómez (Socialist Federal Republic of Yugoslavia) Slobodan Živojinović
- Tokyo Indoor

The 1988 Tokyo Indoor – also known by its sponsored name Seiko Super Tennis – was a men's tennis tournament. Part of the 1988 Nabisco Grand Prix, it took place on from 18 October to 23 October 1988 on indoor carpet courts at the Yoyogi National Gymnasium in Tokyo. It was a major tournament of the Grand Prix tennis circuit and matches were the best of three sets. Second-seeded Boris Becker won the singles title.

== Finals ==
=== Singles ===
(West Germany) Boris Becker defeated (Australia) John Fitzgerald 7–6^{(7–4)}, 6–4

- It was Becker's 5th singles title of the year and the 17th of his career.

=== Doubles ===
(Ecuador) Andrés Gómez / (Socialist Federal Republic of Yugoslavia) Slobodan Živojinović defeated (West Germany) Boris Becker / (West Germany) Eric Jelen 7–5, 5–7, 6–3
