= 1987 Volvo Tennis Chicago – Doubles =

Doubles
- 1987 Volvo Tennis Chicago

Final
- Champions: (United States) Paul Annacone (South Africa) Christo van Rensburg
- Runners-up: (United States) Mike De Palmer (United States) Gary Donnelly
- Score: 6–3, 7–6^{(7–4)}

Details
- Draw: 16 (1WC)
- Seeds: 4

Events
Singles	Doubles
← 1986 ·	Chicago Grand Prix	· 1991 →

Ken Flach and Robert Seguso were the defending champions, but Seguso did not compete this year. Flach teamed up with Brad Gilbert and lost in the first round to Eddie Edwards and Francisco González.

Paul Annacone and Christo van Rensburg won the title by defeating Mike De Palmer and Gary Donnelly 6–3, 7–6^{(7–4)} in the final.

== Seeds ==
1. (United States) Paul Annacone / (South Africa) Christo van Rensburg (champions)
2. (United States) Sherwood Stewart / (Australia) Kim Warwick (first round)
3. (United States) Ken Flach / (United States) Brad Gilbert (first round)
4. (United States) Mike De Palmer / (United States) Gary Donnelly (final)

== Draw ==
=== Key ===
- Q = Qualifier
- WC = Wild card
- LL = Lucky loser
- Alt = Alternate
- SE = Special exempt
- PR = Protected ranking
- ITF = ITF entry
- JE = Junior exempt
- w/o = Walkover
- r = Retired
- d = Defaulted
- SR = Special ranking

=== Draw ===
First round
1	(United States) P Annacone (South Africa) C van Rensburg	7	7
(United States) S Denton (South Africa) C Steyn	6	6
(New Zealand) K Evernden (United States) P Fleming	6	6
(Chile) R Acuña (United States) T Warneke	4	4
3	(United States) K Flach (United States) B Gilbert	5	6
(South Africa) E Edwards (Paraguay) F González	7	7
(United States) K Jones (United States) J Kriek	4	3
WC	(Australia) S Barr (United States) E Korita	6	6
(United States) G Layendecker (Canada) G Michibata	3	4
(United States) S Davis (United States) D Pate	6	6
(South Africa) G Muller (United States) T Nelson	7	3	6
4	(United States) M de Palmer (United States) G Donnelly	6	6	7
(United States) M Freeman (United States) B Pearce	3	4
(United States) A Kohlberg (United States) R Van't Hof	6	6
(Mexico) L Lavalle (United States) T Pawsat	6	7
2	(United States) S Stewart (Australia) K Warwick	4	5

Quarterfinals
1	(United States) P Annacone (South Africa) C van Rensburg	6	6
(New Zealand) K Evernden (United States) P Fleming	2	4
(South Africa) E Edwards (Paraguay) F González	7	3	7
WC	(Australia) S Barr (United States) E Korita	5	6	5
(United States) S Davis (United States) D Pate	4	3
4	(United States) M de Palmer (United States) G Donnelly	6	6
(United States) A Kohlberg (United States) R Van't Hof	6	7	6
(Mexico) L Lavalle (United States) T Pawsat	7	5	3

Semifinals
1	(United States) P Annacone (South Africa) C van Rensburg	7	6
(South Africa) E Edwards (Paraguay) F González	6	4
4	(United States) M de Palmer (United States) G Donnelly	6	6
(United States) A Kohlberg (United States) R Van't Hof	4	2

Final
1	(United States) P Annacone (South Africa) C van Rensburg	6	7^{7}
4	(United States) M de Palmer (United States) G Donnelly	3	6^{4}
