= 1984 Ebel German Open =

- Date: 7–13 May
- Edition: 76th
- Category: Grand Prix
- Draw: 56S / 28D
- Prize money: $250,000
- Surface: Clay / outdoor
- Location: Hamburg, West Germany
- Venue: Am Rothenbaum

Champions

Singles
- (Spain) Juan Aguilera

Doubles
- (Sweden) Stefan Edberg / (Sweden) Anders Järryd
- Grand Prix German Open

The 1984 Ebel German Open was a men's tennis tournament played on outdoor clay courts at Am Rothenbaum in Hamburg, West Germany that was part of the 1984 Grand Prix circuit. It was the 76th edition of the event and took place from 7 May through 13 May 1984. Unseeded Juan Aguilera won the singles title.

== Finals ==
=== Singles ===
(Spain) Juan Aguilera defeated (Sweden) Henrik Sundström, 6–4, 2–6, 2–6, 6–4, 6–4

- It was Aguilera's 2nd singles title of the year and of his career.

=== Doubles ===
(Sweden) Stefan Edberg / (Sweden) Anders Järryd defeated (Switzerland) Heinz Günthardt / (Hungary) Balázs Taróczy, 6–3, 6–1
