= 1987 Tokyo Indoor =

- Date: 20–24 October
- Edition: 10th
- Category: Grand Prix
- Draw: 32S / 16D
- Prize money: $300,000
- Surface: Carpet / indoor
- Location: Tokyo, Japan
- Venue: Yoyogi National Gymnasium

Champions

Singles
- (Sweden) Stefan Edberg

Doubles
- (Australia) Broderick Dyke / (Netherlands) Tom Nijssen
- Tokyo Indoor

The 1987 Tokyo Indoor also known as "Seiko Super Tennis" was a men's tennis tournament played on indoor carpet courts at the Yoyogi National Gymnasium in Tokyo, Japan that was part of the 1987 Nabisco Grand Prix. The tournament was held from 20 October through 24 October 1987. It was a major tournament of the Grand Prix tennis circuit and matches were the best of three sets. Stefan Edberg won the singles title.

== Finals ==
=== Singles ===
(Sweden) Stefan Edberg defeated (Czechoslovakia) Ivan Lendl 6–7^{(4–7)}, 6–4, 6–4

- It was Edberg's 6th singles title of the year and the 14th of his career.

=== Doubles ===
(Australia) Broderick Dyke / (Netherlands) Tom Nijssen defeated (United States) Sammy Giammalva Jr. / (United States) Jim Grabb 6–3, 6–2
