= 1988 Tokyo Indoor – Singles =

Singles
- 1988 Tokyo Indoor

Final
- Champion: (West Germany) Boris Becker
- Runner-up: (Australia) John Fitzgerald
- Score: 7–6^{(7–4)}, 6–4

Details
- Draw: 32
- Seeds: 8

Events
| Singles | Doubles |
| ← 1987 · | Tokyo Indoor | · 1989 → |

Stefan Edberg was the defending champion, but lost in the semifinals this year.

Boris Becker won the tournament, beating John Fitzgerald in the final, 7–6^{(7–4)}, 6–4.

== Seeds ==
1. (Sweden) Stefan Edberg (semifinals)
2. (West Germany) Boris Becker (champion)
3. (Ecuador) Andrés Gómez (quarterfinals)
4. (Australia) Darren Cahill (first round)
5. (United States) Jay Berger (first round)
6. (Australia) John Fitzgerald (final)
7. (Socialist Federal Republic of Yugoslavia) Slobodan Živojinović (second round)
8. (United States) Dan Goldie (second round)

== Draw ==
=== Key ===
- Q = Qualifier
- WC = Wild card
- LL = Lucky loser
- Alt = Alternate
- SE = Special exempt
- PR = Protected ranking
- ITF = ITF entry
- JE = Junior exempt
- w/o = Walkover
- r = Retired
- d = Defaulted
- SR = Special ranking

=== Finals ===
Semifinals
1 | (Sweden) Stefan Edberg | 6 | 0
6 | (Australia) John Fitzgerald | 7 | 6
(United States) Richard Matuszewski | 6 | 1
2 | (West Germany) Boris Becker | 7 | 6

Final
6 | (Australia) John Fitzgerald | 6 | 4
2 | (West Germany) Boris Becker | 7 | 6

=== Top half ===
First round
1 | (Sweden) S Edberg | 6 | 6
(United States) T Nelson | 2 | 2
(New Zealand) K Evernden | 7 | 3 | 6
(Canada) C Pridham | 6 | 6 | 7
Q | (United States) P Chamberlin | 6 | 6
LL | (United States) J Sobel | 1 | 2
WC | (Japan) T Tsuchihashi | 5 | 3
7 | (Socialist Federal Republic of Yugoslavia) S Živojinović | 7 | 6
3 | (Ecuador) A Gómez | 6 | 6
(United States) J Rive | 4 | 4
(Soviet Union) A Volkov | 7 | 6
Q | (United States) J Bailey | 5 | 1
Q | (United States) R Van't Hof | 6 | 3 | 6
(Australia) B Dyke | 2 | 6 | 4
(United States) K Flach | 4 | 0
6 | (Australia) J Fitzgerald | 6 | 6

Second round
1 | (Sweden) S Edberg | 6 | 7
(Canada) C Pridham | 1 | 5
Q | (United States) P Chamberlin | 6 | 3 | 6
7 | (Socialist Federal Republic of Yugoslavia) S Živojinović | 4 | 6 | 3
3 | (Ecuador) A Gómez | 7 | 6
(Soviet Union) A Volkov | 5 | 4
Q | (United States) R Van't Hof | 3 | 6
6 | (Australia) J Fitzgerald | 6 | 7

Quarterfinals
1 | (Sweden) S Edberg | 7 | 6
Q | (United States) P Chamberlin | 5 | 2
3 | (Ecuador) A Gómez | 3 | 6 | 5
6 | (Australia) J Fitzgerald | 6 | 3 | 7

Semifinals
1 | (Sweden) S Edberg | 6 | 0
6 | (Australia) J Fitzgerald | 7 | 6

=== Bottom half ===
First round
5 | (United States) J Berger | 6 | 3
(United States) R Matuszewski | 7 | 6
(United States) S Giammalva Jr. | 7 | 6
(Peru) J Yzaga | 5 | 4
Q | (United States) T Pawsat | 3 | 7 | 5
(United States) M Davis | 6 | 6 | 7
WC | (Japan) S Matsuoka | 7 | 6
4 | (Australia) D Cahill | 6 | 1
8 | (United States) D Goldie | 4 | 6 | 6
(Australia) J Frawley | 6 | 4 | 3
(Soviet Union) A Olhovskiy | 3 | 2
(West Germany) E Jelen | 6 | 6
(Australia) M Woodforde | 3 | 5
(West Germany) C-U Steeb | 6 | 7
(United States) R Seguso | 4 | 3
2 | (West Germany) B Becker | 6 | 6

Second round
(United States) R Matuszewski | 6 | 7
(United States) S Giammalva Jr. | 3 | 5
(United States) M Davis | 5 | 6
WC | (Japan) S Matsuoka | 7 | 7
8 | (United States) D Goldie | 3 | 4
(West Germany) E Jelen | 6 | 6
(West Germany) C-U Steeb | 7 | 1 | 2
2 | (West Germany) B Becker | 6 | 6 | 6

Quarterfinals
(United States) R Matuszewski | 6 | 6
WC | (Japan) S Matsuoka | 4 | 4
(West Germany) E Jelen | 2 | 1
2 | (West Germany) B Becker | 6 | 6

Semifinals
(United States) R Matuszewski | 6 | 1
2 | (West Germany) B Becker | 7 | 6
