= 1984 Ebel German Open – Doubles =

Doubles
- 1984 Ebel German Open

Final
- Champions: (Sweden) Stefan Edberg (Sweden) Anders Järryd
- Runners-up: (Switzerland) Heinz Günthardt (Hungary) Balázs Taróczy
- Score: 6–3, 6–1

Details
- Draw: 28
- Seeds: 8

Events
Singles	Doubles
- Hamburg European Open

Heinz Günthardt and Balázs Taróczy were the defending champions, but lost in the final to Stefan Edberg and Anders Järryd. The score was 6–3, 6–1.

== Seeds ==
The first four seeds received a bye into the second round.

1. (Australia) Mark Edmondson / (United States) Sherwood Stewart (semifinals)
2. (Australia) Paul McNamee / (United States) Van Winitsky (second round)
3. (Czechoslovakia) Pavel Složil / (Czechoslovakia) Tomáš Šmíd (second round)
4. (Switzerland) Heinz Günthardt / (Hungary) Balázs Taróczy (final)
5. (Sweden) Jan Gunnarsson / (United States) Mike Leach (first round)
6. (Australia) David Graham / (Australia) Laurie Warder (first round)
7. (Australia) John Alexander / (Australia) Wally Masur (second round)
8. (United States) Eric Fromm / (United States) Eliot Teltscher (quarterfinals)

== Draw ==
Key

- Q = Qualifier
- WC = Wild card
- LL = Lucky loser
- Alt = Alternate
- ITF = ITF entry
- PR = Protected ranking
- SR = Special ranking
- SE = Special exempt
- JE = Junior exempt
- JR = Junior Accelerator Programme entrant
- CO = College Accelerator Programme entrant
- NG = Next Gen Accelerator Program entrant
- w/o = Walkover
- r = Retired
- d = Defaulted

=== Finals ===
Semifinals
1	(Australia) Mark Edmondson (United States) Sherwood Stewart	2	7	3
(Sweden) Stefan Edberg (Sweden) Anders Järryd	6	6	6
4	(Switzerland) Heinz Günthardt (Hungary) Balázs Taróczy	6	7
(France) Henri Leconte (France) Yannick Noah	1	6

Final
(Sweden) Stefan Edberg (Sweden) Anders Järryd	6	6
4	(Switzerland) Heinz Günthardt (Hungary) Balázs Taróczy	3	1

=== Top half ===
First round
(France) C Freyss (France) C Roger-Vasselin	3	1
(Peru) P Arraya (Argentina) JL Clerc	6	6
(Israel) S Glickstein (Romania) F Segărceanu	6	6
(West Germany) E Jelen (West Germany) M Westphal	4	4
(Sweden) J Nyström (Sweden) M Wilander	1	3
7	(Australia) J Alexander (Australia) W Masur	6	6
(New Zealand) C Lewis (United Kingdom) J Lloyd	1	1
(Sweden) S Edberg (Sweden) A Järryd	6	6
(United States) S Brawley (Czechoslovakia) J Navrátil	6	6	7
(West Germany) HD Beutel (West Germany) C Zipf	3	7	6
(New Zealand) B Derlin (West Germany) D Keretić	3	6	4
8	(United States) E Fromm (United States) E Teltscher	6	1	6

Second round
1	(Australia) M Edmondson (United States) S Stewart	7	2	6
(Peru) P Arraya (Argentina) JL Clerc	5	6	3
(Israel) S Glickstein (Romania) F Segărceanu	6	7
7	(Australia) J Alexander (Australia) W Masur	3	6
3	(Czechoslovakia) P Složil (Czechoslovakia) T Šmíd	4	3
(Sweden) S Edberg (Sweden) A Järryd	6	6
(United States) S Brawley (Czechoslovakia) J Navrátil	6	3	2
8	(United States) E Fromm (United States) E Teltscher	3	6	6

Quarterfinals
1	(Australia) M Edmondson (United States) S Stewart	7	2	6
(Israel) S Glickstein (Romania) F Segărceanu	5	6	3
(Sweden) S Edberg (Sweden) A Järryd	6	6
8	(United States) E Fromm (United States) E Teltscher	4	2

Semifinals
1	(Australia) M Edmondson (United States) S Stewart	2	7	3
(Sweden) S Edberg (Sweden) A Järryd	6	6	6

=== Bottom half ===
First round
6	(Australia) D Graham (Australia) L Warder	6	2
(United States) M Freeman (United States) B Teacher	7	6
(West Germany) B Becker (Poland) W Fibak	6	7
(Spain) Á Giménez (Spain) J Higueras	0	6
(Denmark) M Mortensen (Czechoslovakia) L Pimek	6	3	6
(West Germany) A Maurer (West Germany) W Popp	4	6	1
5	(Sweden) J Gunnarsson (United States) M Leach	6	6	5
(Socialist Federal Republic of Yugoslavia) M Ostoja (Switzerland) R Stadler	3	7	7
(France) H Leconte (France) Y Noah	6	6
(Sweden) H Sundström (Argentina) G Vilas	1	2
(Spain) J Aguilera (Spain) S Casal	2	6	6
(Switzerland) M Günthardt (Hungary) Z Kuhárszky	6	1	7

Second round
(United States) M Freeman (United States) B Teacher	4	1^{r}
(West Germany) B Becker (Poland) W Fibak	6	2
(Denmark) M Mortensen (Czechoslovakia) L Pimek	6	0	3
4	(Switzerland) H Günthardt (Hungary) B Taróczy	3	6	6
(Socialist Federal Republic of Yugoslavia) M Ostoja (Switzerland) R Stadler	2	3
(France) H Leconte (France) Y Noah	6	6
(Switzerland) M Günthardt (Hungary) Z Kuhárszky	1	7	6
2	(Australia) P McNamee (United States) V Winitsky	6	5	4

Quarterfinals
(West Germany) B Becker (Poland) W Fibak	4	3
4	(Switzerland) H Günthardt (Hungary) B Taróczy	6	6
(France) H Leconte (France) Y Noah	6	6
(Switzerland) M Günthardt (Hungary) Z Kuhárszky	1	4

Semifinals
4	(Switzerland) H Günthardt (Hungary) B Taróczy	6	7
(France) H Leconte (France) Y Noah	1	6
