= 1987 Tokyo Indoor – Doubles =

Doubles
- 1987 Tokyo Indoor

Final
- Champions: (Australia) Broderick Dyke (Netherlands) Tom Nijssen
- Runners-up: (United States) Sammy Giammalva Jr. (United States) Jim Grabb
- Score: 6–3, 6–2

Details
- Draw: 16
- Seeds: 4

Events
Singles	Doubles
- Tokyo Indoor

Mike De Palmer and Gary Donnelly were the defending champions, but Donnelly did not participate this year. De Palmer partnered Paul Annacone, losing in the quarterfinals.

Broderick Dyke and Tom Nijssen won the title, defeating Sammy Giammalva Jr. and Jim Grabb 6–3, 6–2 in the final.

== Seeds ==
1. (United States) Robert Seguso / (Socialist Federal Republic of Yugoslavia) Slobodan Živojinović (semifinals)
2. (United States) Paul Annacone / (United States) Mike De Palmer (quarterfinals)
3. (United States) Rick Leach / (United States) Tim Pawsat (first round)
4. (West Germany) Boris Becker / (West Germany) Eric Jelen (quarterfinals, withdrew)

== Draw ==
Key

- Q = Qualifier
- WC = Wild card
- LL = Lucky loser
- Alt = Alternate
- ITF = ITF entry
- PR = Protected ranking
- SR = Special ranking
- SE = Special exempt
- JE = Junior exempt
- JR = Junior Accelerator Programme entrant
- CO = College Accelerator Programme entrant
- NG = Next Gen Accelerator Program entrant
- w/o = Walkover
- r = Retired
- d = Defaulted

=== Draw ===
First round
1	(United States) R Seguso (Socialist Federal Republic of Yugoslavia) S Živojinović	6	6
WC	(Czechoslovakia) I Lendl (Japan) S Matsuoka	3	4
(United States) P Chamberlin (United States) C Hooper	6	6	7
(West Germany) D Keretić (United States) J Ross	3	7	6
3	(United States) R Leach (United States) T Pawsat	3	6
(Sweden) J Carlsson (Sweden) M Pernfors	6	7
(Australia) D Cahill (Australia) S Youl	1	7	4
(United States) S Giammalva Jr. (United States) J Grabb	6	5	6
(United States) R Baxter (United States) J Rive	6	6
(Australia) B Dyke (Netherlands) T Nijssen	7	7
(West Germany) W Popp (West Germany) C Saceanu	4	6	1
4	(West Germany) B Becker (West Germany) E Jelen	6	3	6
(New Zealand) S Guy (Nigeria) T Mmoh	6	6	3
(United States) M Davis (Australia) B Drewett	7	3	6
(Canada) G Michibata (United States) T Siegel	3	6	4
2	(United States) P Annacone (United States) M De Palmer	6	4	6

Quarterfinals
1	(United States) R Seguso (Socialist Federal Republic of Yugoslavia) S Živojinović	5	6	6
(United States) P Chamberlin (United States) C Hooper	7	3	3
(Sweden) J Carlsson (Sweden) M Pernfors	6	3	4
(United States) S Giammalva Jr. (United States) J Grabb	4	6	6
(Australia) B Dyke (Netherlands) T Nijssen	w/o
4	(West Germany) B Becker (West Germany) E Jelen
(United States) M Davis (Australia) B Drewett	6	6	6
2	(United States) P Annacone (United States) M De Palmer	7	4	3

Semifinals
1	(United States) R Seguso (Socialist Federal Republic of Yugoslavia) S Živojinović	6	3	3
(United States) S Giammalva Jr. (United States) J Grabb	2	6	6
(Australia) B Dyke (Netherlands) T Nijssen	3	7	7
(United States) M Davis (Australia) B Drewett	6	6	6

Final
(United States) S Giammalva Jr. (United States) J Grabb	3	2
(Australia) B Dyke (Netherlands) T Nijssen	6	6
