= 1997 Davis Cup World Group qualifying round =

The 1997 Davis Cup World Group qualifying round was held from 20 to 22 September. They were the main play-offs of the 1997 Davis Cup. The winners of the playoffs advanced to the 1998 Davis Cup World Group, and the losers were relegated to their respective Zonal Regions I.

== Teams ==
Bold indicates team had qualified for the 1998 Davis Cup World Group.

From World Group

- **Brazil**
- France
- **Germany**
- **India**
- Mexico
- Romania
- **Russia**
- **Switzerland**

From Americas Group I

- Canada
- Chile

From Asia/Oceania Group I

- New Zealand
- South Korea

From Europe/Africa Group I

- Austria
- **Belgium**
- **Slovakia**
- **Zimbabwe**

== Results summary ==
Date: 19–21 September

The eight losing teams in the World Group first round ties and eight winners of the Zonal Group I final round ties competed in the World Group qualifying round for spots in the 1997 World Group.

| Home team | Score | Visiting team | Location | Venue | Door | Surface | Ref. |
|---|---|---|---|---|---|---|---|
| **Zimbabwe** | 3–2 | Austria | Harare | City Sports Centre | Indoor | Hard | |
| **Brazil** | 5–0 | New Zealand | Florianópolis | Costão Santinho Hotel | Outdoor | Clay | |
| **India** | 3–2 | Chile | New Delhi | R.K. Khanna Tennis Complex | Outdoor | Grass | |
| **Belgium** | 3–2 | France | Ghent | Flanders Expo | Indoor | Clay | |
| **Germany** | 5–0 | Mexico | Essen | Grugahalle | Indoor | Carpet | |
| **Russia** | 3–2 | Romania | Moscow | Olympic Stadium | Indoor | Carpet | |
| Canada | 1–4 | **Slovakia** | Montreal | Jarry Park Stadium | Indoor | Carpet | |
| **Switzerland** | 3–2 | South Korea | Locarno | FEVI | Indoor | Carpet | |

- Brazil, Germany, India, Russia and Switzerland remain in the World Group in 1998.
- Belgium, Slovakia and Zimbabwe are promoted to the World Group in 1998.
- Austria, Canada, Chile, New Zealand and South Korea remain in Zonal Group I in 1998.
- France, Mexico and Romania are relegated to Zonal Group I in 1998.

== Qualifying results ==
=== Zimbabwe vs. Austria ===
Zimbabwe
3
City Sports Centre, Harare, Zimbabwe
19–21 September 1997
Hard (indoors)

Austria
2

| | | | 1 | 2 | 3 | 4 | 5 |
|---|---|---|---|---|---|---|---|
| 1 | (Zimbabwe) (Austria) | **Byron Black**; Gilbert Schaller | **6**; 3 | **6**; 2 | **6**; 1 |
| 2 | (Zimbabwe) (Austria) | Wayne Black; **Thomas Muster** | 3; **6** | 0; **6** | 4; **6** |
| 3 | (Zimbabwe) (Austria) | **Byron Black / Wayne Black**; Georg Blumauer / Gerald Mandl | **7**; 5 | **6**; 4 | **6**; 3 |
| 4 | (Zimbabwe) (Austria) | Byron Black; **Thomas Muster** | **6**; 3 | 3; **6** | **6**; 2 | 3; **6** | 1; **6** |
| 5 | (Zimbabwe) (Austria) | **Wayne Black**; Gerald Mandl | 5; **7** | **6**; 3 | **6**; 3 | **6**; 0 |

=== Brazil vs. New Zealand ===
Brazil
5
Costão Santinho Hotel, Florianópolis, Brazil
19–21 September 1997
Clay

New Zealand
0

| | | | 1 | 2 | 3 | 4 | 5 |
|---|---|---|---|---|---|---|---|
| 1 | (Brazil) (New Zealand) | **Gustavo Kuerten**; Alistair Hunt | **7**; 5 | **6**; 3 | **6**; 2 |
| 2 | (Brazil) (New Zealand) | **Fernando Meligeni**; Brett Steven | **6**; 3 | **7**; 5 | **6**; 4 |
| 3 | (Brazil) (New Zealand) | **Gustavo Kuerten / Jaime Oncins**; Alistair Hunt / Brett Steven | **6**; 0 | **6**; 2 | **6**; 0 |
| 4 | (Brazil) (New Zealand) | **Gustavo Kuerten**; Brett Steven | **6**; 1 | **6**; 0 |
| 5 | (Brazil) (New Zealand) | **André Sá**; Alistair Hunt | **6**; 2 | **6**; 2 |

=== India vs. Chile ===
India
3
R.K. Khanna Tennis Complex, New Delhi, India
19–21 September 1997
Grass

Chile
2

| | | | 1 | 2 | 3 | 4 | 5 |
|---|---|---|---|---|---|---|---|
| 1 | (India) (Chile) | **Leander Paes**; Gabriel Silberstein | **6**; 3 | **6**; 2 | **6**; 2 |
| 2 | (India) (Chile) | Mahesh Bhupathi; **Marcelo Ríos** | 2; **6** | **6**; 3 | 3; **6** | 4; **6** |
| 3 | (India) (Chile) | **Mahesh Bhupathi / Leander Paes**; Nicolás Massú / Marcelo Ríos | 3; **6** | **6**; 3 | **6**; 4 | 6^{3} **7^{7}** | **6**; 3 |
| 4 | (India) (Chile) | Leander Paes; **Marcelo Ríos** | **7^{7}** 6^{5} | 4; **6** | 0; **6** | 6^{3} **7^{7}** |
| 5 | (India) (Chile) | **Mahesh Bhupathi**; Nicolás Massú | 6^{4} **7^{7}** | 4; **6** | **6**; 4 | **6**; 4 | **6**; 3 |

=== Belgium vs. France ===
Belgium
3
Flanders Expo, Ghent, Belgium
19–21 September 1997
Clay (indoors)

France
2

| | | | 1 | 2 | 3 | 4 | 5 |
|---|---|---|---|---|---|---|---|---|
| 1 | (Belgium) (France) | **Filip Dewulf**; Fabrice Santoro | **6**; 1 | **6**; 3 | **6**; 3 |
| 2 | (Belgium) (France) | **Johan Van Herck**; Cédric Pioline | 4; **6** | 2; **6** | **7**; 5 | 4; 1 | | **retired** |
| 3 | (Belgium) (France) | Filip Dewulf / Libor Pimek; **Guillaume Raoux / Fabrice Santoro** | **7**; 5 | 5; **7** | 5; **7** | 1; **6** |
| 4 | (Belgium) (France) | Filip Dewulf; **Guillaume Raoux** | 3; **6** | 4; **6** | 5; **7** |
| 5 | (Belgium) (France) | **Christophe Van Garsse**; Lionel Roux | **7**; 5 | **6**; 4 | 1; **6** | **6**; 2 |

=== Germany vs. Mexico ===
Germany
5
Grugahalle, Essen, Germany
19–21 September 1997
Carpet (indoors)

Mexico
0

| | | | 1 | 2 | 3 | 4 | 5 |
|---|---|---|---|---|---|---|---|
| 1 | (Germany) (Mexico) | **Boris Becker**; Luis Herrera | **7**; 5 | **6**; 2 | **6**; 3 |
| 2 | (Germany) (Mexico) | **Marc-Kevin Goellner**; Alejandro Hernández | **7**; 5 | **6**; 3 | **6**; 3 |
| 3 | (Germany) (Mexico) | **Marc-Kevin Goellner / Jens Knippschild**; Óscar Ortiz / David Roditi | **7^{7}** 6^{4} | **7^{7}** 6^{4} | 4; **6** | **6**; 3 |
| 4 | (Germany) (Mexico) | **Boris Becker**; Alejandro Hernández | **6**; 4 | **7**; 5 |
| 5 | (Germany) (Mexico) | **Jens Knippschild**; Luis Herrera | **6**; 2 | 3; **6** | **6**; 4 |

=== Russia vs. Romania ===
Russia
3
Olympic Stadium, Moscow, Russia
19–21 September 1997
Carpet (indoors)

Romania
2

| | | | 1 | 2 | 3 | 4 | 5 |
|---|---|---|---|---|---|---|---|
| 1 | (Russia) (Romania) | **Alexander Volkov**; Andrei Pavel | **6**; 3 | 6^{5} **7^{7}** | **6**; 2 | **6**; 4 |
| 2 | (Russia) (Romania) | **Yevgeny Kafelnikov**; Ionuț Moldovan | **6**; 4 | **7^{9}** 6^{7} | **6**; 4 |
| 3 | (Russia) (Romania) | Yevgeny Kafelnikov / Andrei Olhovskiy; **Andrei Pavel / Gabriel Trifu** | 4; **6** | 4; **6** | 4; **6** |
| 4 | (Russia) (Romania) | Yevgeny Kafelnikov; **Andrei Pavel** | 4; **6** | **6**; 3 | 4; **6** | 1; **6** |
| 5 | (Russia) (Romania) | **Alexander Volkov**; Ionuț Moldovan | **6**; 4 | **6**; 3 | **7**; 5 |

=== Canada vs. Slovakia ===
Canada
1
Jarry Park Stadium, Montreal, Canada
19–21 September 1997
Carpet (indoors)

Slovakia
4

| | | | 1 | 2 | 3 | 4 | 5 |
|---|---|---|---|---|---|---|---|
| 1 | (Canada) (Slovakia) | Daniel Nestor; **Karol Kučera** | 3; **6** | 3; **6** | 6^{0} **7^{7}** |
| 2 | (Canada) (Slovakia) | Sébastien Lareau; **Dominik Hrbatý** | 6^{7} **7^{9}** | **6**; 4 | 6^{5} **7^{7}** | 3; **6** |
| 3 | (Canada) (Slovakia) | **Grant Connell / Daniel Nestor**; Dominik Hrbatý / Ján Krošlák | **6**; 2 | **6**; 3 | **6**; 4 |
| 4 | (Canada) (Slovakia) | Sébastien Lareau; **Karol Kučera** | **7**; 5 | 2; **6** | 4; **6** | 3; **6** |
| 5 | (Canada) (Slovakia) | Daniel Nestor; **Dominik Hrbatý** | 4; **6** | **7^{7}** 6^{3} | 3; **6** |

=== Switzerland vs. South Korea ===
Switzerland
3
FEVI, Locarno, Switzerland
19–21 September 1997
Carpet (indoors)

South Korea
2

| | | | 1 | 2 | 3 | 4 | 5 |
|---|---|---|---|---|---|---|---|
| 1 | (Switzerland) (South Korea) | **Marc Rosset**; Lee Hyung-taik | **6**; 3 | **7^{7}** 6^{2} | **7^{7}** 6^{4} |
| 2 | (Switzerland) (South Korea) | **Ivo Heuberger**; Yoon Yong-il | **6**; 3 | **6**; 3 | **6**; 4 |
| 3 | (Switzerland) (South Korea) | **Lorenzo Manta / Marc Rosset**; Lee Hyung-taik / Yoon Yong-il | **7^{7}** 6^{5} | **7^{7}** 6^{5} | **6**; 4 |
| 4 | (Switzerland) (South Korea) | Lorenzo Manta; **Yoon Yong-il** | 4; **6** | 3; **6** |
| 5 | (Switzerland) (South Korea) | Ivo Heuberger; **Lee Hyung-taik** | 5; **7** | 2; **6** |
