= 1988 Tokyo Indoor – Doubles =

Doubles
- 1988 Tokyo Indoor

Final
- Champions: (Ecuador) Andrés Gómez (Socialist Federal Republic of Yugoslavia) Slobodan Živojinović
- Runners-up: (West Germany) Boris Becker (West Germany) Eric Jelen
- Score: 7–5, 5–7, 6–3

Details
- Draw: 16
- Seeds: 4

Events
Singles	Doubles
- Tokyo Indoor

Broderick Dyke and Tom Nijssen were the defending doubles champions at the Tokyo Indoor tennis tournament, but Nijssen did not participate this year. Dyke partnered Kelly Evernden, losing in the first round.

Andrés Gómez and Slobodan Živojinović won the title, defeating Boris Becker and Eric Jelen 7–5, 5–7, 6–3 in the final.

== Seeds ==
1. (United States) Ken Flach / (United States) Robert Seguso (quarterfinals)
2. (Australia) Darren Cahill / (Australia) John Fitzgerald (first round)
3. (United States) Marty Davis / (Australia) Brad Drewett (semifinals)
4. (Canada) Grant Connell / (Canada) Glenn Michibata (first round)

== Draw ==
Key

- Q = Qualifier
- WC = Wild card
- LL = Lucky loser
- Alt = Alternate
- ITF = ITF entry
- PR = Protected ranking
- SR = Special ranking
- SE = Special exempt
- JE = Junior exempt
- JR = Junior Accelerator Programme entrant
- CO = College Accelerator Programme entrant
- NG = Next Gen Accelerator Program entrant
- w/o = Walkover
- r = Retired
- d = Defaulted

=== Draw ===
First round
1	(United States) K Flach (United States) R Seguso	6	5	6
(United States) E Korita (United States) J Levine	3	7	4
(United States) J Rive (United States) L Shiras	5	6
(Ecuador) A Gómez (Socialist Federal Republic of Yugoslavia) S Živojinović	7	7
3	(United States) M Davis (Australia) B Drewett	7	6
(United States) T Pawsat (United States) B Pearce	6	4
WC	(Japan) H Shirato (Japan) E Takeuchi	6	2	6
(United States) R Baxter (West Germany) W Popp	2	6	4
(West Germany) B Becker (West Germany) E Jelen	7	7
(Australia) B Dyke (New Zealand) K Evernden	6	6
(United States) D Goldie (Japan) S Matsuoka	1	6	6
4	(Canada) G Connell (Canada) G Michibata	6	1	4
(United States) M Basham (United States) C Beckman	4	4
(United States) P Chamberlin (United States) T Nelson	6	6
(United States) S Giammalva Jr. (United States) R Van't Hof	6	6
2	(Australia) D Cahill (Australia) J Fitzgerald	3	4

Quarterfinals
1	(United States) K Flach (United States) R Seguso	4	6
(Ecuador) A Gómez (Socialist Federal Republic of Yugoslavia) S Živojinović	6	7
3	(United States) M Davis (Australia) B Drewett	6	7
WC	(Japan) H Shirato (Japan) E Takeuchi	2	6
(West Germany) B Becker (West Germany) E Jelen	3	6	7
(United States) D Goldie (Japan) S Matsuoka	6	2	6
(United States) P Chamberlin (United States) T Nelson	3	6
(United States) S Giammalva Jr. (United States) R Van't Hof	6	7

Semifinals
(Ecuador) A Gómez (Socialist Federal Republic of Yugoslavia) S Živojinović	6	6
3	(United States) M Davis (Australia) B Drewett	4	4
(West Germany) B Becker (West Germany) E Jelen	6	6	6
(United States) S Giammalva Jr. (United States) R Van't Hof	7	4	3

Final
(Ecuador) A Gómez (Socialist Federal Republic of Yugoslavia) S Živojinović	7	5	6
(West Germany) B Becker (West Germany) E Jelen	5	7	3
