= 1984 Ebel German Open – Singles =

Singles
- 1984 Ebel German Open

Final
- Champion: (Spain) Juan Aguilera
- Runner-up: (Sweden) Henrik Sundström
- Score: 6–4, 2–6, 2–6, 6–4, 6–4

Details
- Draw: 56 (7Q)
- Seeds: 16

Events
Singles	Doubles
- Hamburg European Open

Yannick Noah was the defending champion, but lost in the quarterfinals to tournament winner Juan Aguilera.

Aguilera won the title by defeating Henrik Sundström 6–4, 2–6, 2–6, 6–4, 6–4 in the final.

== Seeds ==
The first eight seeds received a bye into the second round.

1. (Sweden) Mats Wilander (semifinals)
2. (France) Yannick Noah (quarterfinals)
3. (Spain) José Higueras (third round)
4. (Ecuador) Andrés Gómez (quarterfinals)
5. (United States) Eliot Teltscher (second round)
6. (Argentina) Guillermo Vilas (semifinals)
7. (Argentina) José Luis Clerc (second round)
8. (Czechoslovakia) Tomáš Šmíd (third round)
9. (Sweden) Anders Järryd (third round)
10. (Sweden) Henrik Sundström (final)
11. (Sweden) Stefan Edberg (first round)
12. (New Zealand) Chris Lewis (third round)
13. (Switzerland) Heinz Günthardt (second round)
14. (France) Henri Leconte (first round)
15. (United States) Gene Mayer (quarterfinals)
16. (Sweden) Joakim Nyström (first round)

== Draw ==
Key

- Q = Qualifier
- WC = Wild card
- LL = Lucky loser
- Alt = Alternate
- ITF = ITF entry
- PR = Protected ranking
- SR = Special ranking
- SE = Special exempt
- JE = Junior exempt
- JR = Junior Accelerator Programme entrant
- CO = College Accelerator Programme entrant
- NG = Next Gen Accelerator Program entrant
- w/o = Walkover
- r = Retired
- d = Defaulted

=== Finals ===
Quarterfinals
1	(Sweden) Mats Wilander	6	6
(Belgium) Libor Pimek	0	2
4	(Ecuador) Andrés Gómez	4	6	4
10	(Sweden) Henrik Sundström	6	3	6
6	(Argentina) Guillermo Vilas	6	6
15	(United States) Gene Mayer	3	2
(Spain) Juan Aguilera	6	2	7
2	(France) Yannick Noah	4	6	5

Semifinals
1	(Sweden) Mats Wilander	2	5
10	(Sweden) Henrik Sundström	6	7
6	(Argentina) Guillermo Vilas	6	3
(Spain) Juan Aguilera	7	6

Final
10	(Sweden) Henrik Sundström	4	6	6	4	4
(Spain) Juan Aguilera	6	2	2	6	6

=== Top half ===
==== Section 1 ====
First round
(United States) E Fromm	3	3
(Australia) P McNamee	6	6
Q	(Republic of Ireland) S Sorensen	6	6
(United States) S Giammalva Jr.	3	2
(West Germany) D Keretić	7	6
11	(Sweden) S Edberg	6	4
14	(France) H Leconte	6	3	4
(United Kingdom) J Lloyd	1	6	6
(Hungary) B Taróczy	4	2
(Poland) W Fibak	6	6
Q	(France) C Freyss	0	5
(Belgium) L Pimek	6	7

Second round
1	(Sweden) M Wilander	7	4	6
(Australia) P McNamee	5	6	2
Q	(Republic of Ireland) S Sorensen	2	5
(West Germany) D Keretić	6	7
(United Kingdom) J Lloyd	3	1
(Poland) W Fibak	6	6
(Belgium) L Pimek	4	6	6
5	(United States) E Teltscher	6	4	3

Third round
1	(Sweden) M Wilander	3	6	6
(West Germany) D Keretić	6	0	2
(Poland) W Fibak	1	6	3
(Belgium) L Pimek	6	3	6

Quarterfinals
1	(Sweden) M Wilander	6	6
(Belgium) L Pimek	0	2

==== Section 2 ====
First round
(Switzerland) R Stadler	2	2
Q	(Denmark) M Mortensen	6	6
Q	(West Germany) H Schwaier	2	3
(Israel) S Glickstein	6	6
(Spain) F Luna	6	6
16	(Sweden) J Nyström	3	3
10	(Sweden) H Sundström	6	6
Q	(West Germany) E Jelen	0	4
(West Germany) B Becker	6	6	6
(Spain) S Casal	3	7	1
(West Germany) M Westphal	6	6
(Czechoslovakia) P Složil	3	4

Second round
4	(Ecuador) A Gómez	6	3	7
Q	(Denmark) M Mortensen	1	6	5
(Israel) S Glickstein	0	5
(Spain) F Luna	6	7
10	(Sweden) H Sundström	6	6
(West Germany) B Becker	3	4
(West Germany) M Westphal	1	6
8	(Czechoslovakia) T Šmíd	6	7

Third round
4	(Ecuador) A Gómez	7	7
(Spain) F Luna	6	6
10	(Sweden) H Sundström	6	6
8	(Czechoslovakia) T Šmíd	3	4

Quarterfinals
4	(Ecuador) A Gómez	4	6	4
10	(Sweden) H Sundström	6	3	6

=== Bottom half ===
==== Section 3 ====
First round
(United States) V Winitsky	5	4
(Australia) M Edmondson	7	6
(Romania) F Segărceanu	6	6	6
(Italy) C Panatta	4	7	2
(Australia) J Alexander	4	3
9	(Sweden) A Järryd	6	6
15	(United States) G Mayer	6	7
(United States) M Leach	4	6
(Sweden) T Högstedt	3	0
(Australia) W Masur	6	6
(Peru) P Arraya	6	6
(Socialist Federal Republic of Yugoslavia) M Ostoja	1	2

Second round
6	(Argentina) G Vilas	6	6
(Australia) M Edmondson	3	1
(Romania) F Segărceanu	2	5
9	(Sweden) A Järryd	6	7
15	(United States) G Mayer	6	6
(Australia) W Masur	4	2
(Peru) P Arraya	4	6	3
3	(Spain) J Higueras	6	4	6

Third round
6	(Argentina) G Vilas	4	6	7
9	(Sweden) A Järryd	6	1	6
15	(United States) G Mayer	6	6
3	(Spain) J Higueras	4	3

Quarterfinals
6	(Argentina) G Vilas	6	6
15	(United States) G Mayer	3	2

==== Section 4 ====
First round
(Hungary) Z Kuhárszky	6	3	7
(United Kingdom) C Dowdeswell	3	6	5
(France) C Roger-Vasselin	3	1
(Spain) J Aguilera	6	6
Q	(West Germany) W Popp	2	4
13	(Switzerland) H Günthardt	6	6
12	(New Zealand) C Lewis	6	7
Q	(Czechoslovakia) J Navrátil	3	6
(United States) B Teacher	6	2	6
(United States) H Solomon	2	6	3
(France) T Tulasne	1	7	6
(Sweden) J Gunnarsson	6	5	1

Second round
7	(Argentina) JL Clerc	4	4
(Hungary) Z Kuhárszky	6	6
(Spain) J Aguilera	6	6
13	(Switzerland) H Günthardt	0	2
12	(New Zealand) C Lewis	4	6	7
(United States) B Teacher	6	2	5
(France) T Tulasne	4	6	5
2	(France) Y Noah	6	3	7

Third round
(Hungary) Z Kuhárszky	3	3
(Spain) J Aguilera	6	6
12	(New Zealand) C Lewis	1	2
2	(France) Y Noah	6	6

Quarterfinals
(Spain) J Aguilera	6	2	7
2	(France) Y Noah	4	6	5
