= 1987 Tokyo Indoor – Singles =

Singles
- 1987 Tokyo Indoor

Final
- Champion: (Sweden) Stefan Edberg
- Runner-up: (Czechoslovakia) Ivan Lendl
- Score: 6–7, 6–4, 6–4

Details
- Draw: 32
- Seeds: 8

Events
Singles	Doubles
- Tokyo Indoor

Boris Becker was the defending champion, but he retired from his quarterfinals match this year.

Second-seeded Stefan Edberg won the tournament, beating first-seeded Ivan Lendl in the final, 6–7, 6–4, 6–4.

== Seeds ==
1. (Czechoslovakia) Ivan Lendl (final)
2. (Sweden) Stefan Edberg (champion)
3. (West Germany) Boris Becker (quarterfinals, retired)
4. (United States) Jimmy Connors (second round)
5. (Socialist Federal Republic of Yugoslavia) Slobodan Živojinović (semifinals)
6. (Sweden) Mikael Pernfors (semifinals)
7. (United States) Paul Annacone (quarterfinals)
8. (Sweden) Ulf Stenlund (first round)

== Draw ==
Key

- Q = Qualifier
- WC = Wild card
- LL = Lucky loser
- Alt = Alternate
- ITF = ITF entry
- PR = Protected ranking
- SR = Special ranking
- SE = Special exempt
- JE = Junior exempt
- JR = Junior Accelerator Programme entrant
- CO = College Accelerator Programme entrant
- NG = Next Gen Accelerator Program entrant
- w/o = Walkover
- r = Retired
- d = Defaulted

=== Finals ===
Semifinals
1	(Czechoslovakia) Ivan Lendl	6	6
6	(Sweden) Mikael Pernfors	0	2
5	(Socialist Federal Republic of Yugoslavia) Slobodan Živojinović	6	6	2
2	(Sweden) Stefan Edberg	7	4	6

Final
1	(Czechoslovakia) Ivan Lendl	7	4	4
2	(Sweden) Stefan Edberg	6	6	6

=== Top half ===
First round
1	(Czechoslovakia) I Lendl	6	6
(United States) J Canter	1	4
(Australia) B Drewett	6	2	3
(United States) R Seguso	4	6	6
WC	(Japan) T Tsuchihashi	2	6
(Australia) B Dyke	6	7
(West Germany) E Jelen	2	7	6
8	(Sweden) U Stenlund	6	5	2
4	(United States) J Connors	6	6
(United States) M Davis	4	3
Q	(Australia) J Fitzgerald	6	6
Q	(West Germany) C Saceanu	1	4
(United States) S Giammalva Jr.	6	6
Q	(New Zealand) S Guy	2	1
(Netherlands) T Nijssen	3	6	2
6	(Sweden) M Pernfors	6	4	6

Second round
1	(Czechoslovakia) I Lendl	6	6
(United States) R Seguso	2	0
(Australia) B Dyke	6	3	2
(West Germany) E Jelen	3	6	6
4	(United States) J Connors	3	1
Q	(Australia) J Fitzgerald	6	6
(United States) S Giammalva Jr.	3	2
6	(Sweden) M Pernfors	6	6

Quarterfinals
1	(Czechoslovakia) I Lendl	6	6
(West Germany) E Jelen	3	0
Q	(Australia) J Fitzgerald	2	1
6	(Sweden) M Pernfors	6	6

Semifinals
1	(Czechoslovakia) I Lendl	6	6
6	(Sweden) M Pernfors	0	2

=== Bottom half ===
First round
5	(Socialist Federal Republic of Yugoslavia) S Živojinović	6	7
(United States) J Rive	4	5
(Australia) S Youl	6	6	4
(Nigeria) T Mmoh	3	7	6
(West Germany) W Popp	1	1
(West Germany) D Keretić	6	6
(United States) J Grabb	5	5
3	(West Germany) B Becker	7	7
7	(United States) P Annacone	6	7
WC	(Japan) S Matsuoka	1	6
(Australia) D Cahill	6	6
Q	(United States) J Ross	1	3
(Sweden) J Carlsson	6	6	7
(United States) M De Palmer	7	4	6
WC	(Japan) T Fukui	5	2
2	(Sweden) S Edberg	7	6

Second round
5	(Socialist Federal Republic of Yugoslavia) S Živojinović	6	6
(Nigeria) T Mmoh	2	3
(West Germany) D Keretić	2	3
3	(West Germany) B Becker	6	6
7	(United States) P Annacone	6	6
(Australia) D Cahill	4	2
(Sweden) J Carlsson	0	2
2	(Sweden) S Edberg	6	6

Quarterfinals
5	(Socialist Federal Republic of Yugoslavia) S Živojinović	6	1	3
3	(West Germany) B Becker	3	6	0^{r}
7	(United States) P Annacone	6	1	2
2	(Sweden) S Edberg	3	6	6

Semifinals
5	(Socialist Federal Republic of Yugoslavia) S Živojinović	6	6	2
2	(Sweden) S Edberg	7	4	6
