= 1986 Volvo Tennis Chicago =

- Date: March 24–30
- Edition: 2nd
- Category: Grand Prix circuit
- Draw: 32S / 16D
- Prize money: $250,000
- Surface: Carpet / indoor
- Location: Chicago, Illinois, US
- Venue: UIC Pavilion

Champions

Singles
- (West Germany) Boris Becker

Doubles
- (United States) Ken Flach / (United States) Robert Seguso
- Chicago Grand Prix

The 1986 Volvo Tennis Chicago was a men's tennis tournament played on indoor carpet courts at the UIC Pavilion in Chicago, Illinois in the United States that was part of the 1986 Nabisco Grand Prix. It was the second edition of the tournament and was held from March 24 through March 30, 1986. Third-seeded Boris Becker, who entered on a wildcard, won the singles title.

== Finals ==
=== Singles ===
(West Germany) Boris Becker defeated (Czechoslovakia) Ivan Lendl 7–6, 6–3

- It was Becker's 1st singles title of the year and the 4th of his career.

=== Doubles ===
(United States) Ken Flach / (United States) Robert Seguso defeated (South Africa) Eddie Edwards / (Paraguay) Francisco González 6–0, 7–5
