= Chicago Open (tennis) =

Tennis tournament in Chicago, Illinois, US

Defunct tennis tournament
- Event name: Chicago Grand Prix (1985–1987)
- Tour: Grand Prix circuit (1985–1987), ATP Tour (1991)
- Founded: 1973
- Abolished: 1987
- Editions: 7
- Location: Chicago, Illinois, US (1985–1987)
- Venue: UIC Pavilion
- Surface: Carpet (i) (1985–1987)

The Chicago Open also known as the Volvo Chicago Open, its sponsored name is a defunct professional tennis tournament founded in 1973 as the Chicago International until 1975 both events were played on indoor carpet courts. This initial tournament and this event were part of the Grand Prix circuit. It was held annually at the UIC Pavilion in Chicago, Illinois, US, from 1985 to 1987. It is unrelated to a World Championship Tennis event held in Chicago for one year in 1982.

The singles tournament saw four American players reach the final in the three years of the tournament: Tim Mayotte won the title in 1987 against countryman David Pate, John McEnroe beat compatriot Jimmy Connors in 1985. Boris Becker defeated Ivan Lendl in 1986. In doubles, American duo Ken Flach and Robert Seguso reached the final on two occasions, winning in 1986 and losing in 1985.

== Past finals ==
=== Singles ===
Included:

Year	Champions	Runners-up	Score
1973	(Netherlands) Tom Okker	(Australia) John Newcombe	3–6, 7–6, 6–3
1974	(United States) Stan Smith	(United States) Marty Riessen	3–6, 6–1, 6–4
1975	(United States) Roscoe Tanner	(Australia) John Alexander	6–1, 6–7, 7–6
1976-84: not held
1985	(United States) John McEnroe	(United States) Jimmy Connors	Walkover
1986	(Germany) Boris Becker	(Czech Republic) Ivan Lendl	7–6, 6–3
1987	(United States) Tim Mayotte	(United States) David Pate	6–4, 6–2
1988-90: not held
1991	(United States) John McEnroe	(United States) Patrick McEnroe	3–6, 6–2, 6–4

=== Doubles ===
Year	Champions	Runners-up	Score
1987	(United States) Paul Annacone (South Africa) Christo van Rensburg	(United States) Mike De Palmer (United States) Gary Donnelly	6–3, 7–6^{(7–4)}
1986	(United States) Ken Flach (United States) Robert Seguso	(South Africa) Eddie Edwards (Paraguay) Francisco González	6–0, 7–5
1985	(United States) Johan Kriek (France) Yannick Noah	(United States) Ken Flach (United States) Robert Seguso	3–6, 4–6, 7–5, 6–1, 6–4

== Event Names ==
Official

- Chicago International (1973)
- Chicago International Tennis Festival (1974–75)
- Chicago International Open (1985–86)
- Chicago Grand Prix (1987)
- Chicago Open (1991)

Sponsored

- Tam International (1973–75)
- Volvo Tennis Chicago (1985–87)
- Volvo Chicago Open (1991)

== See also ==
- List of tennis tournaments
