= John McEnroe career statistics =

Former tennis player John McEnroe won a total of 155 ATP titles, 77 in ATP Tour singles, 77 in men's doubles, and 1 in mixed doubles. He won 25 singles titles on the ATP Champions tour. He won seven Grand Slam singles titles. He also won a record eight year end championship titles overall, the Masters championships three times, and the WCT Finals, a record five times. His career singles match record was 875–198 (81.55%). He posted the best single-season match record for a male player in the Open Era with win–loss record: 82–3 (96.5%) set in 1984 and has the best carpet court career match winning percentage: 84.18% (411–65) of any player. McEnroe was the third male player to reach three consecutive Grand Slam finals in a calendar year during the open era, in 1984 after Rod Laver reached all four Grand Slam finals in 1969 and Bjorn Borg reached the last three Grand Slam finals in 1978, 1980, and 1981.

McEnroe had winning records against Jimmy Connors (20–14), Stefan Edberg (7–6), Guillermo Vilas (8–6), Mats Wilander (7–6), Michael Chang (4–1), Ilie Năstase (4–2). McEnroe was even with Björn Borg (7–7), but trailed against Goran Ivanišević (2–4), Boris Becker (2–8) and Ivan Lendl (15–21). McEnroe won 12 of his last 14 matches with Connors, beginning with the 1983 Cincinnati tournament. Edberg won his last five matches with McEnroe, beginning with the 1989 tournament in Tokyo. McEnroe won four of his last five matches with Vilas, beginning with the 1981 tournament in Boca Raton, Florida. Lastly, Lendl won 11 of his last 12 matches with McEnroe, beginning with the 1985 US Open.

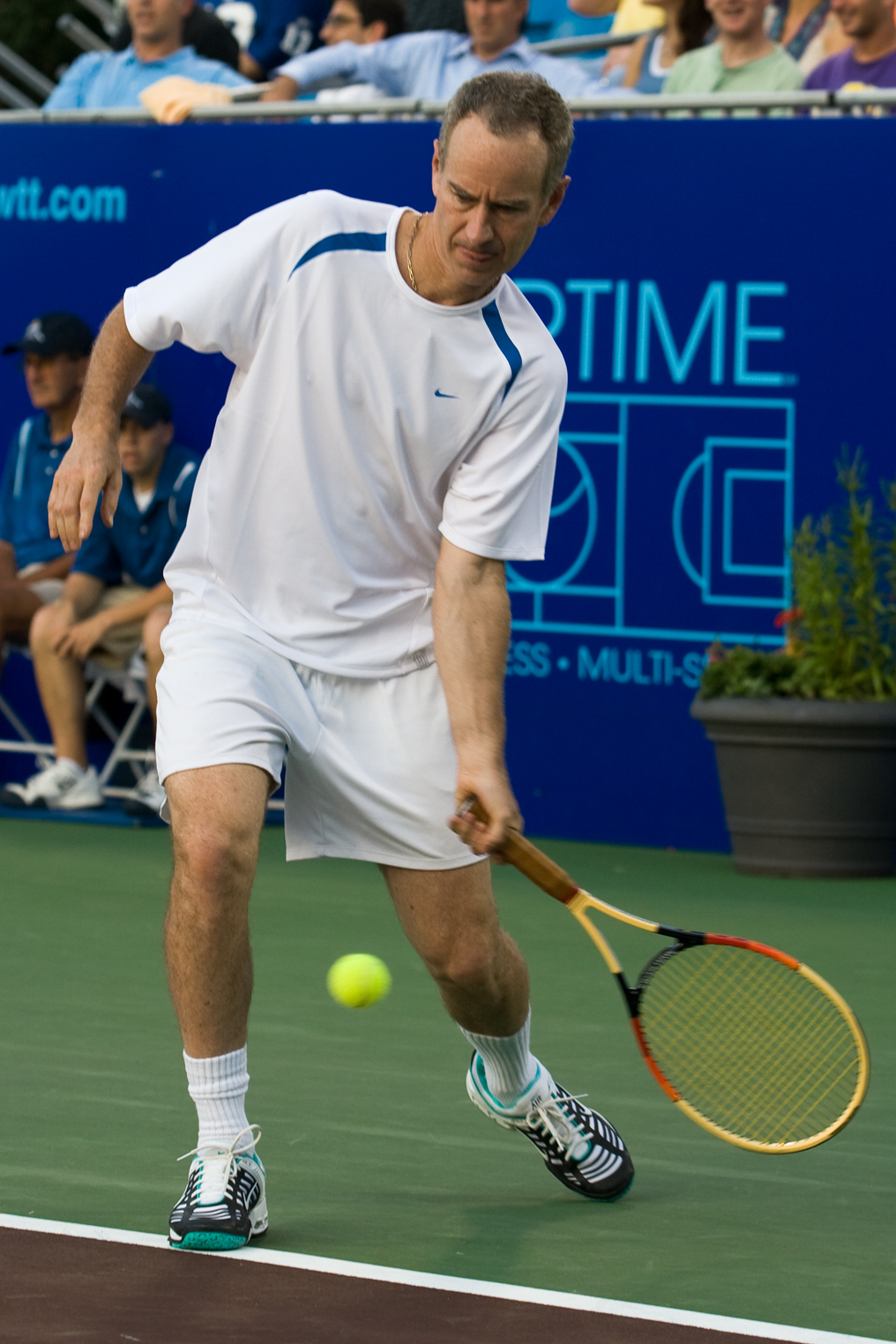
McEnroe playing World Team Tennis in 2007.

== Grand Slam tournament finals ==
=== Singles: 11 finals (7 titles, 4 runner–ups) ===
Result	Year	Championship	Surface	Opponent	Score
Win	1979	US Open	Hard	(United States) Vitas Gerulaitis	7–5, 6–3, 6–3
Loss	1980	Wimbledon	Grass	(Sweden) Björn Borg	6–1, 5–7, 3–6, 7–6^{(18–16)}, 6–8
Win	1980	US Open (2)	Hard	(Sweden) Björn Borg	7–6^{(7–4)}, 6–1, 6–7^{(5–7)}, 5–7, 6–4
Win	1981	Wimbledon	Grass	(Sweden) Björn Borg	4–6, 7–6^{(7–1)}, 7–6^{(7–4)}, 6–4
Win	1981	US Open (3)	Hard	(Sweden) Björn Borg	4–6, 6–2, 6–4, 6–3
Loss	1982	Wimbledon	Grass	(United States) Jimmy Connors	6–3, 3–6, 7–6^{(7–2)}, 6–7^{(5–7)}, 4–6
Win	1983	Wimbledon (2)	Grass	(New Zealand) Chris Lewis	6–2, 6–2, 6–2
Loss	1984	French Open	Clay	(Czechoslovakia) Ivan Lendl	6–3, 6–2, 4–6, 5–7, 5–7
Win	1984	Wimbledon (3)	Grass	(United States) Jimmy Connors	6–1, 6–1, 6–2
Win	1984	US Open (4)	Hard	(Czechoslovakia) Ivan Lendl	6–3, 6–4, 6–1
Loss	1985	US Open	Hard	(Czechoslovakia) Ivan Lendl	6–7^{(1–7)}, 3–6, 4–6

=== Doubles: 12 (9 titles, 3 runner-ups) ===
Result	Year	Championship	Surface	Partner	Opponents	Score
Loss	1978	Wimbledon	Grass	(United States) Peter Fleming	(South Africa) Bob Hewitt (South Africa) Frew McMillan	1–6, 4–6, 2–6
Win	1979	Wimbledon	Grass	(United States) Peter Fleming	(United States) Brian Gottfried (Mexico) Raul Ramírez	4–6, 6–4, 6–2, 6–2
Win	1979	US Open	Hard	(United States) Peter Fleming	(United States) Bob Lutz (United States) Stan Smith	6–2, 6–4
Loss	1980	US Open	Hard	(United States) Peter Fleming	(United States) Bob Lutz (United States) Stan Smith	6–7, 6–3, 1–6, 6–3, 3–6
Win	1981	Wimbledon (2)	Grass	(United States) Peter Fleming	(United States) Bob Lutz (United States) Stan Smith	6–4, 6–4, 6–4
Win	1981	US Open (2)	Hard	(United States) Peter Fleming	(Switzerland) Heinz Günthardt (Australia) Peter McNamara	walkover
Loss	1982	Wimbledon (2)	Grass	(United States) Peter Fleming	(Australia) Peter McNamara (Australia) Paul McNamee	3–6, 2–6
Win	1983	Wimbledon (3)	Grass	(United States) Peter Fleming	(United States) Tim Gullikson (United States) Tom Gullikson	6–4, 6–3, 6–4
Win	1983	US Open (3)	Hard	(United States) Peter Fleming	(United States) Fritz Buehning (United States) Van Winitsky	6–3, 6–4, 6–2
Win	1984	Wimbledon (4)	Grass	(United States) Peter Fleming	(Australia) Pat Cash (Australia) Paul McNamee	6–2, 5–7, 6–2, 3–6, 6–3
Win	1989	US Open (4)	Hard	(Australia) Mark Woodforde	(United States) Ken Flach (United States) Robert Seguso	6–4, 4–6, 6–3, 6–3
Win	1992	Wimbledon (5)	Grass	(Germany) Michael Stich	(United States) Jim Grabb (United States) Richey Reneberg	5–7, 7–6^{(7–5)}, 3–6, 7–6^{(7–5)}, 19–17

=== Mixed doubles: 1 (1 title) ===
Result	Year	Championship	Surface	Partner	Opponents	Score
Win	1977	French Open	Clay	(United States) Mary Carillo	(Romania) Florența Mihai (Colombia) Iván Molina	7–6, 6–3

== Grand Prix year-end championships finals ==
=== Singles: 4 (3 titles, 1 runner–up) ===
Result	Year	Tournament	Surface	Opponent	Score
Win	1978	Grand Prix Masters	Carpet (i)	(United States) Arthur Ashe	6–7, 6–3, 7–5
Loss	1982	Grand Prix Masters	Carpet (i)	(Czechoslovakia) Ivan Lendl	4–6, 4–6, 2–6
Win	1983	Grand Prix Masters	Carpet (i)	(Czechoslovakia) Ivan Lendl	6–3, 6–3, 6–4
Win	1984	Grand Prix Masters	Carpet (i)	(Czechoslovakia) Ivan Lendl	7–5, 6–0, 6–4

Note: during this period the year-end championships were called the Grand Prix Masters and were played in January of the following year.

== WCT year-end championships finals ==
=== Singles: 8 (5 titles, 3 runner–ups) ===
Result	Date	Tournament	Surface	Opponent	Score
Win	May 1979	WCT Finals	Carpet (i)	(Sweden) Björn Borg	7–5, 4–6, 6–2, 7–6
Loss	May 1980	WCT Finals	Carpet (i)	(United States) Jimmy Connors	6–2, 6–7, 1–6, 2–6
Win	May 1981	WCT Finals	Carpet (i)	(United States) Johan Kriek	6–1, 6–2, 6–4
Loss	Apr 1982	WCT Finals	Carpet (i)	(Czechoslovakia) Ivan Lendl	6–2, 3–6, 3–6, 3–6
Win	May 1983	WCT Finals	Carpet (i)	(Czechoslovakia) Ivan Lendl	6–2, 4–6, 6–3, 6–7, 7–6
Win	Apr 1984	WCT Finals	Carpet (i)	(United States) Jimmy Connors	6–1, 6–2, 6–3
Loss	Apr 1987	WCT Finals	Carpet (i)	(Czechoslovakia) Miloslav Mečíř	0–6, 6–3, 3–6, 2–6
Win	Mar 1989	WCT Finals	Carpet (i)	(United States) Brad Gilbert	6–3, 6–3, 7–6

== Career finals ==
=== Singles: 109 (77 titles, 32 runner-ups) ===
Tournament category	W-L
Grand Slam tournaments	7–4
Year-end championships – Grand Prix	3–1
Year-end championships – WCT	5–3
Grand Prix / WCT / ATP Tour	62–24

Titles by surface
Clay (4–4)
Grass (8–5)
Hard (22–9)
Carpet (43–14)

Titles by setting
Outdoor (25–15)
Indoor (52–17)

Result	W-L	Date	Tournament	Surface	Opponent	Score
Loss	0–1	Jun 1978	London/Queen's Club, UK	Grass	(Australia) Tony Roche	6–8, 7–9
Win	1–1	Sep 1978	Hartford, U.S.	Carpet (i)	(South Africa) Johan Kriek	6–2, 6–4
Win	2–1	Oct 1978	San Francisco, US	Carpet (i)	(United States) Dick Stockton	2–6, 7–6^{(7–5)}, 6–2
Loss	2–2	Oct 1978	Basel, Switzerland	Hard (i)	(Argentina) Guillermo Vilas	3–6, 7–5, 5–7, 4–6
Win	3–2	Nov 1978	Stockholm, Sweden	Hard (i)	(United States) Tim Gullikson	6–2, 6–2
Win	4–2	Nov 1978	London, UK	Carpet (i)	(United States) Tim Gullikson	6–7^{(5–7)}, 6–4, 7–6^{(7–5)}, 6–2
Win	5–2	Jan 1979	Masters, New York City, US	Carpet (i)	(United States) Arthur Ashe	6–7^{(5–7)}, 6–3, 7–5
Win	6–2	Mar 1979	New Orleans, US	Carpet (i)	(United States) Roscoe Tanner	6–4, 6–2
Win	7–2	Apr 1979	Milan, Italy	Carpet (i)	(Australia) John Alexander	6–4, 6–3
Loss	7–3	Apr 1979	Rotterdam, Netherlands	Carpet (i)	(Sweden) Björn Borg	4–6, 2–6
Win	8–3	Apr 1979	San Jose, US	Carpet (i)	(United States) Peter Fleming	7–6, 7–6
Win	9–3	May 1979	WCT Finals, US	Carpet (i)	(Sweden) Björn Borg	7–5, 4–6, 6–2, 7–6^{(7–5)}
Win	10–3	Jun 1979	London/Queen's Club, UK	Grass	(Paraguay) Víctor Pecci	6–7^{(2–7)}, 6–1, 6–1
Win	11–3	Aug 1979	South Orange, US	Clay	(United Kingdom) John Lloyd	6–7^{(1–7)}, 6–4, 6–0
Loss	11–4	Aug 1979	Toronto, Canada	Hard	(Sweden) Björn Borg	3–6, 3–6
Win	12–4	Sep 1979	US Open, New York City, US	Hard	(United States) Vitas Gerulaitis	7–5, 6–3, 6–3
Loss	12–5	Sep 1979	Los Angeles, U.S.	Carpet (i)	(United States) Peter Fleming	4–6, 4–6
Win	13–5	Sep 1979	San Francisco, US (2)	Carpet (i)	(United States) Peter Fleming	4–6, 7–5, 6–2
Win	14–5	Nov 1979	Stockholm, Sweden (2)	Hard (i)	(United States) Gene Mayer	6–7, 6–3, 6–3
Win	15–5	Nov 1979	London, UK (2)	Carpet (i)	(United States) Harold Solomon	6–3, 6–4, 7–5
Loss	15–6	Jan 1980	Philadelphia, U.S.	Carpet (i)	(United States) Jimmy Connors	3–6, 6–2, 3–6, 6–3, 4–6
Win	16–6	Feb 1980	Richmond WCT, US	Carpet (i)	(United States) Roscoe Tanner	6–1, 6–2
Win	17–6	Mar 1980	Memphis, US	Carpet (i)	(United States) Jimmy Connors	7–6^{(8–6)}, 7–6^{(7–4)}
Win	18–6	Mar 1980	Milan, Italy (2)	Carpet (i)	(India) Vijay Amritraj	6–1, 6–4
Loss	18–7	May 1980	Dallas WCT, U.S.	Carpet (i)	(United States) Jimmy Connors	6–2, 6–7^{(4–7)}, 1–6, 2–6
Loss	18–8	May 1980	WCT ToC, Forest Hills, US	Clay	(United States) Vitas Gerulaitis	6–2, 2–6, 0–6
Win	19–8	Jun 1980	London/Queen's Club, UK (2)	Grass	(Australia) Kim Warwick	6–3, 6–1
Loss	19–9	Jul 1980	Wimbledon, London, UK	Grass	(Sweden) Björn Borg	6–1, 5–7, 3–6, 7–6^{(18–16)}, 6–8
Loss	19–10	Aug 1980	South Orange, U.S.	Clay	(Argentina) José Luis Clerc	3–6, 2–6
Win	20–10	Sep 1980	US Open, New York City, US (2)	Hard	(Sweden) Björn Borg	7–6^{(7–4)}, 6–1, 6–7^{(5–7)}, 5–7, 6–4
Win	21–10	Oct 1980	Brisbane, Australia	Grass	(Australia) Phil Dent	6–3, 6–4
Win	22–10	Oct 1980	Sydney Indoor, Australia	Hard (i)	(United States) Vitas Gerulaitis	6–3, 6–4
Loss	22–11	Nov 1980	Stockholm, Sweden	Carpet (i)	(Sweden) Björn Borg	3–6, 4–6
Win	23–11	Nov 1980	London, UK (3)	Carpet (i)	(United States) Gene Mayer	6–4, 6–3, 6–3
Win	24–11	Dec 1980	WCT Montreal, Canada	Carpet (i)	(India) Vijay Amritraj	6–1, 6–2, 6–1
Win	25–11	Feb 1981	Pepsi Grand Slam, Boca Raton, US	Clay	(Argentina) Guillermo Vilas	6–7^{(5–7)}, 6–4, 6–0
Win	26–11	Mar 1981	Milan, Italy (3)	Carpet (i)	(Sweden) Björn Borg	7–6^{(7–2)}, 6–4
Win	27–11	Apr 1981	Frankfurt, West Germany	Carpet (i)	(Czechoslovakia) Tomáš Šmíd	6–2, 6–3
Win	28–11	Apr 1981	Los Angeles, US	Hard	(United States) Sandy Mayer	6–7, 6–3, 6–3
Win	29–11	May 1981	WCT Finals, U.S. (2)	Carpet (i)	(South Africa) Johan Kriek	6–1, 6–2, 6–4
Win	30–11	Jun 1981	London/Queen's Club, UK (3)	Grass	(United States) Brian Gottfried	7–6^{(8–6)}, 7–5
Win	31–11	Jul 1981	Wimbledon, London, UK	Grass	(Sweden) Björn Borg	4–6, 7–6^{(7–1)}, 7–6^{(7–4)}, 6–4
Win	32–11	Aug 1981	Cincinnati, US	Hard	(New Zealand) Chris Lewis	6–3, 6–4
Win	33–11	Sep 1981	US Open, New York City, US (3)	Hard	(Sweden) Björn Borg	4–6, 6–2, 6–4, 6–3
Win	34–11	Oct 1981	Sydney Indoor, Australia (2)	Hard (i)	(United States) Roscoe Tanner	6–4, 7–5, 6–2
Loss	34–12	Nov 1981	Wembley, UK	Carpet (i)	(United States) Jimmy Connors	6–3, 6–2, 3–6, 4–6, 2–6
Win	35–12	Jan 1982	Philadelphia, US	Carpet (i)	(United States) Jimmy Connors	6–3, 6–3, 6–1
Loss	35–13	Feb 1982	Memphis, U.S.	Carpet (i)	(South Africa) Johan Kriek	3–6, 6–3 4–6
Loss	35–14	Apr 1982	Dallas WCT, U.S.	Carpet (i)	(Czechoslovakia) Ivan Lendl	2–6, 6–3, 3–6, 3–6
Loss	35–15	Jun 1982	London/Queen's Club, UK	Grass	(United States) Jimmy Connors	5–7, 3–6
Loss	35–16	Jul 1982	Wimbledon, London, UK	Grass	(United States) Jimmy Connors	6–3, 3–6, 7–6^{(7–2)}, 6–7^{(5–7)}, 4–6
Win	36–16	Sep 1982	San Francisco, US (3)	Carpet (i)	(United States) Jimmy Connors	6–1, 6–3
Win	37–16	Oct 1982	Sydney Indoor, Australia (3)	Hard (i)	(United States) Gene Mayer	6–4, 6–1, 6–4
Win	38–16	Oct 1982	Tokyo Indoor, Japan	Carpet (i)	(Australia) Peter McNamara	7–6^{(8–6)}, 7–5
Win	39–16	Nov 1982	London, UK (4)	Carpet (i)	(United States) Brian Gottfried	6–3, 6–2, 6–4
Loss	39–17	Jan 1983	Masters, New York City, U.S.	Carpet (i)	(Czechoslovakia) Ivan Lendl	4–6, 4–6, 2–6
Win	40–17	Feb 1983	Philadelphia, US (2)	Carpet (i)	(Czechoslovakia) Ivan Lendl	4–6, 7–6^{(9–7)}, 6–4, 6–3
Win	41–17	May 1983	WCT Finals, U.S. (3)	Carpet (i)	(Czechoslovakia) Ivan Lendl	6–2, 4–6, 6–3, 6–7^{(5–7)}, 7–6^{(7–0)}
Win	42–17	May 1983	WCT ToC, Forest Hills, US	Clay	(United States) Vitas Gerulaitis	6–3, 7–5
Loss	42–18	Jun 1983	London/Queen's Club, UK	Grass	(United States) Jimmy Connors	3–6, 3–6
Win	43–18	Jul 1983	Wimbledon, London, UK (2)	Grass	(New Zealand) Chris Lewis	6–2, 6–2, 6–2
Loss	43–19	Aug 1983	Cincinnati, U.S.	Hard	(Sweden) Mats Wilander	4–6, 4–6
Loss	43–20	Sep 1983	San Francisco, U.S.	Carpet (i)	(Czechoslovakia) Ivan Lendl	6–3, 6–7^{(4–7)}, 4–6
Win	44–20	Oct 1983	Sydney Indoor, Australia (4)	Hard (i)	(France) Henri Leconte	6–1, 6–4, 7–5
Win	45–20	Nov 1983	London, UK (5)	Carpet (i)	(United States) Jimmy Connors	7–5, 6–1, 6–4
Win	46–20	Jan 1984	Masters, New York City, US (2)	Carpet (i)	(Czechoslovakia) Ivan Lendl	6–3, 6–4, 6–4
Win	47–20	Jan 1984	Philadelphia, US (3)	Carpet (i)	(Czechoslovakia) Ivan Lendl	6–3, 3–6, 6–3, 7–6^{(7–3)}
Win	48–20	Feb 1984	Richmond WCT, US (2)	Carpet (i)	(United States) Steve Denton	6–3, 7–6^{(9–7)}
Win	49–20	Mar 1984	Madrid, Spain	Carpet (i)	(Czechoslovakia) Tomáš Šmíd	6–0, 6–4
Win	50–20	Mar 1984	Brussels, Belgium	Carpet (i)	(Czechoslovakia) Ivan Lendl	6–1, 6–3
Win	51–20	Apr 1984	WCT Finals, US (4)	Carpet (i)	(United States) Jimmy Connors	6–1, 6–2, 6–3
Win	52–20	May 1984	WCT ToC, Forest Hills, US (2)	Clay	(Czechoslovakia) Ivan Lendl	6–4, 6–2
Loss	52–21	Jun 1984	French Open, Paris, France	Clay	(Czechoslovakia) Ivan Lendl	6–3, 6–2, 4–6, 5–7, 5–7
Win	53–21	Jun 1984	London/Queen's Club, UK (4)	Grass	(United States) Leif Shiras	6–1, 3–6, 6–2
Win	54–21	Jul 1984	Wimbledon, London, UK (3)	Grass	(United States) Jimmy Connors	6–1, 6–1, 6–2
Win	55–21	Aug 1984	Toronto, Canada	Hard	(United States) Vitas Gerulaitis	6–0, 6–3
Win	56–21	Sep 1984	US Open, New York City, U.S. (4)	Hard	(Czechoslovakia) Ivan Lendl	6–3, 6–4, 6–1
Win	57–21	Sep 1984	San Francisco, US (4)	Carpet (i)	(United States) Brad Gilbert	6–4, 6–4
Win	58–21	Nov 1984	Stockholm, Sweden (3)	Hard (i)	(Sweden) Mats Wilander	6–2, 3–6, 6–2
Win	59–21	Jan 1985	Masters, New York City, US (3)	Carpet (i)	(Czechoslovakia) Ivan Lendl	7–5, 6–0, 6–4
Win	60–21	Jan 1985	Philadelphia, US (4)	Carpet (i)	(Czechoslovakia) Miloslav Mečíř	6–3, 7–6^{(7–5)}, 6–1
Win	61–21	Mar 1985	Houston, US	Carpet (i)	(South Africa) Kevin Curren	7–5, 6–1, 7–6^{(7–4)}
Win	62–21	Mar 1985	Milan, Italy (4)	Carpet (i)	(Sweden) Anders Järryd	6–4, 6–1
Win	63–21	Apr 1985	Chicago, US	Carpet (i)	(United States) Jimmy Connors	Walkover
Win	64–21	Apr 1985	Atlanta, US	Carpet (i)	(United States) Paul Annacone	7–6^{(7–2)}, 7–6^{(7–5)}, 6–2
Loss	64–22	May 1985	WCT ToC, Forest Hills, US	Clay	(Czechoslovakia) Ivan Lendl	3–6, 3–6
Win	65–22	Aug 1985	Stratton Mountain, US.	Hard	(Czechoslovakia) Ivan Lendl	7–6^{(7–4)}, 6–2
Win	66–22	Aug 1985	Montreal, Canada (2)	Hard	(Czechoslovakia) Ivan Lendl	7–5, 6–3
Loss	66–23	Sep 1985	US Open, New York City, U.S.	Hard	(Czechoslovakia) Ivan Lendl	6–7^{(1–7)}, 3–6, 4–6
Win	67–23	Nov 1985	Stockholm, Sweden (4)	Hard (i)	(Sweden) Anders Järryd	6–1, 6–2
Win	68–23	Sep 1986	Los Angeles, US (2)	Hard	(Sweden) Stefan Edberg	6–2, 6–3
Win	69–23	Sep 1986	San Francisco, US (5)	Carpet (i)	(United States) Jimmy Connors	7–6^{(8–6)}, 6–3
Win	70–23	Oct 1986	Scottsdale, US (2)	Hard	(United States) Kevin Curren	6–3, 3–6, 6–2
Loss	70–24	Feb 1987	Philadelphia, U.S.	Carpet (i)	(United States) Tim Mayotte	6–3, 1–6, 3–6, 1–6
Loss	70–25	Mar 1987	Rotterdam, Netherlands	Carpet (i)	(Sweden) Stefan Edberg	6–3, 3–6, 1–6
Loss	70–26	Mar 1987	Brussels, Belgium	Carpet (i)	(Sweden) Mats Wilander	3–6, 4–6
Loss	70–27	Apr 1987	Dallas – WCT Finals, U.S.	Carpet (i)	(Czechoslovakia) Miloslav Mečíř	0–6, 6–3, 2–6, 2–6
Loss	70–28	Aug 1987	Stratton Mountain, U.S.	Hard	(Czechoslovakia) Ivan Lendl	7–6, 1–4 match abandoned (rain)
Win	71–28	Apr 1988	Tokyo Outdoor, Japan	Hard	(Sweden) Stefan Edberg	6–2, 6–2
Loss	71–29	Aug 1988	Indianapolis, U.S.	Hard	(West Germany) Boris Becker	4–6, 2–6
Win	72–29	Nov 1988	Detroit, US	Carpet (i)	(United States) Aaron Krickstein	7–5, 6–2
Win	73–29	Feb 1989	Lyon, France	Carpet (i)	(Switzerland) Jakob Hlasek	6–3, 7–6^{(7–3)}
Win	74–29	Mar 1989	WCT Finals, US (5)	Carpet (i)	(United States) Brad Gilbert	6–3, 6–3, 7–6^{(7–3)}
Win	75–29	Aug 1989	Indianapolis, US	Hard	(United States) Jay Berger	6–4, 4–6, 6–4
Loss	75–30	Aug 1989	Montreal, Canada	Hard	(Czechoslovakia) Ivan Lendl	1–6, 3–6
Loss	75–31	Oct 1989	Toulouse, France	Hard (i)	(United States) Jimmy Connors	3–6, 3–6
Win	76–31	Sep 1990	Basel, Switzerland	Hard (i)	(Socialist Federal Republic of Yugoslavia) Goran Ivanišević	6–7^{(4–7)}, 4–6, 7–6^{(7–3)}, 6–3, 6–4
Win	77–31	Mar 1991	Chicago, US (2)	Carpet (i)	(United States) Patrick McEnroe	3–6, 6–2, 6–4
Loss	77–32	Sep 1991	Basel, Switzerland	Hard (i)	(Switzerland) Jakob Hlasek	6–7^{(4–7)}, 0–6, 3–6

=== Exhibition events ===
Year	Date	Tournament	Surface	Prize Money	Opponent	Score
1980	May 14–18	Kobe – Gunze Invitational	Carpet	$175,000	(United States) Victor Amaya	6–2, 6–3
1981	January 7–12	Rosemont – Challenge of Champions	Carpet	$310,000	(United States) Jimmy Connors	6–2, 6–4, 6–1
1981	August 3–9	Fréjus - Round Robin Invitational	Hard		(France) Thierry Tulasne	6–2, 6–3, 2–6, 6–4
1982	May 31-June 5	Manchester, United Kingdom – GMC Mobens Kitchens	Grass	$18,000	(New Zealand) Russell Simpson	6–3, 6–7, 10–8
1983	November 15–20	Antwerp – European Champions' Championship	Carpet	$750,000	(United States) Gene Mayer	6–4, 6–3, 6–4
1985	January 1–6	Las Vegas – AT&T Challenge of Champions	Carpet	$1,290,000	(Argentina) Guillermo Vilas	7–5, 6–0
1986	November 5–10	Antwerp – European Community Championship	Carpet	$940,000	(Czechoslovakia) Miloslav Mečíř	6–3, 1–6, 7–6^{(7–5)}, 5–7, 6–2
1987	October 6–11	Atlanta – AT&T Challenge of Champions	Carpet	$500,000	(United States) Paul Annacone	6–4, 7–5
1988	November 1–6	Antwerp – European Community Championship	Carpet	$940,000	(Soviet Union) Andrei Chesnokov	6–1, 7–5, 6–2
1989	June 5–11	Beckenham Kent Grass Court	Grass		(Australia) Broderick Dyke	6–4, 7–6^{(7–0)}
1989	June 12–18	Edinburgh Scottish Grass Court	Grass		(United States) Jimmy Connors	7–6^{(7–2)}, 7–6^{(7–4)}
1990	September 13–16	Palo Alto California Tennis Challenge	Hard		(United States) Paul Annacone	3–6, 6–4, 6–2

==== Non ATP listed events ====
McEnroe's tournament titles that are not included in the statistics on the Association of Tennis Professionals website. The website has some omissions for tournaments held since 1968.

Year	Date	Tournament	Surface	Opponent	Score
1979	July 21–22	San Benedetto – Abruzzo Invitational	Carpet (i)	(Italy) Corrado Barazzutti	6–3, 6–2
1979	July 23–24	Fréjus – All Stars Exhibition Series	Hard	(United States) Jimmy Connors	6–4, 6–3
1979	October 10–12	Melbourne – BP Super Challenge Round robin	Carpet (i)	(United States) Vitas Gerulaitis	6–4, 7–6
1979	October 13–14	Perth – Super Challenge Tennis	Carpet (i)	(Argentina) Guillermo Vilas	6–2, 6–4
1980	April 7–8	Brussels – Invitational Cup	Carpet (i)	(United States) Jimmy Connors	6–1, 7–5
1981	April 7–8	Rome – Invitational Challenge	Carpet (i)	(Czechoslovakia) Ivan Lendl	7–6, 6–4
1982	November 1–3	Perth – Swan Lager Super Challenge	Carpet (i)	(Sweden) Björn Borg	6–1, 6–4
1983	November 25–27	Canberra – Rio Tennis Challenge	Carpet (i)	(Czechoslovakia) Ivan Lendl	6–3, 6–1
1984	February 15–18	Sydney – Akai Gold Challenge Tennis	Carpet (i)	(Argentina) Guillermo Vilas	6–3, 6–3, 6–3
1984	March 5–6	Osaka – Japan Invitational Cup	Carpet (i)	(France) Yannick Noah	7–6, 0–6, 6–3
1985	April 15–16	Inglewood – Tennis Challenge Series	Carpet (i)	(United States) Ivan Lendl	6–4, 7–6
1986	November 4–5	Bologna – All Stars Tennis Classic	Carpet (i)	(Italy) Paolo Canè	6–1, 6–2
1988	April 26–27	Inglewood – Tennis Challenge Series	Carpet (i)	(Sweden) Stefan Edberg	6–3, 6–4
1988	October 21–22	Turin – Torino Sport Palace Classic	Carpet (i)	(United States) Aaron Krickstein	6–3, 6–1
1988	December 9–11	Inglewood – Michelin Challenge	Carpet (i)	(United States) Ivan Lendl	7–5, 6–2
1990	January 11–14	Adelaide – Rio International Challenge	Hard	(Sweden) Stefan Edberg	4–6, 7–6, 6–4

Sources for this section

- Michel Sutter, Vainqueurs Winners 1946–2003, Paris, 2003. Sutter has attempted to list all tournaments meeting his criteria for selection beginning with 1946 and ending in the fall of 1991. For each tournament, he has indicated the city, the date of the final, the winner, the runner-up, and the score of the final. A tournament is included in his list if: (1) the draw for the tournament included at least eight players (with a few exceptions, such as the Pepsi Grand Slam tournaments in the second half of the 1970s); and (2) the level of the tournaments was at least equal to the present day challenger tournaments.
- John Barrett, editor, World of Tennis Yearbooks, London, from 1976 through 1993.

=== Doubles (99) ===
==== Titles: (77) ====
Result	W-L	Date	Tournament	Surface	Partner	Opponents	Score
Win	1.	Aug 1978	South Orange, New Jersey, US	Clay	(United States) Peter Fleming	(Romania) Ion Țiriac (Argentina) Guillermo Vilas	6–3, 6–3
Win	2.	Sep 1978	Hartford, US	Carpet (i)	(United States) Bill Maze	(Australia) Mark Edmondson (United States) Van Winitsky	6–3, 3–6, 7–5
Win	3.	1978	San Francisco, US	Carpet (i)	(United States) Peter Fleming	(United States) Robert Lutz (United States) Stan Smith	5–7, 6–4, 6–4
Win	4.	1978	Basel, Switzerland	Hard (i)	(Poland) Wojciech Fibak	(United States) Bruce Manson (Rhodesia) Andrew Pattison	7–6, 7–5
Win	5.	1978	Cologne, Germany	Hard (i)	(United States) Peter Fleming	(South Africa) Bob Hewitt (South Africa) Frew McMillan	6–3, 6–2
Win	6.	1978	Bologna, Italy	Carpet (i)	(United States) Peter Fleming	(France) Jean-Louis Haillet (Italy) Antonio Zugarelli	6–1, 6–4
Win	7.	1978	Masters, New York City	Carpet	(United States) Peter Fleming	(Poland) Wojciech Fibak (Netherlands) Tom Okker	6–4, 6–2, 6–4
Win	8.	1979	World Doubles WCT, London	Carpet (i)	(United States) Peter Fleming	(Romania) Ilie Năstase (United States) Sherwood Stewart	3–6, 6–2, 6–3, 6–1
Win	9.	1979	Richmond WCT, US	Carpet (i)	(United States) Brian Gottfried	(Romania) Ion Țiriac (Argentina) Guillermo Vilas	6–4, 6–3
Win	10.	1979	New Orleans, US	Carpet (i)	(United States) Peter Fleming	(United States) Robert Lutz (United States) Stan Smith	6–1, 6–3
Win	11.	1979	Milan, Italy	Carpet (i)	(United States) Peter Fleming	(Argentina) José Luis Clerc (Czechoslovakia) Tomáš Šmíd	6–1, 6–3
Win	12.	1979	Rotterdam, Netherlands	Carpet (i)	(United States) Peter Fleming	(Switzerland) Heinz Günthardt (South Africa) Bernard Mitton	6–4, 6–4
Win	13.	1979	San Jose, US	Carpet (i)	(United States) Peter Fleming	(United States) Hank Pfister (United States) Brad Rowe	6–3, 6–4
Win	14.	1979	Wimbledon, London, UK	Grass	(United States) Peter Fleming	(United States) Brian Gottfried (Mexico) Raúl Ramírez	4–6, 6–4, 6–2, 6–2
Win	15.	1979	Forest Hills WCT Invitational, US	Clay	(United States) Peter Fleming	(United States) Gene Mayer (United States) Sandy Mayer	6–7, 7–6, 6–3
Win	16.	1979	South Orange, New Jersey, US (2)	Clay	(United States) Peter Fleming	(United States) Fritz Buehning (United States) Bruce Nichols	6–1, 6–3
Win	17.	1979	Indianapolis, US	Clay	(United States) Gene Mayer	(Czechoslovakia) Jan Kodeš (Czechoslovakia) Tomáš Šmíd	6–4, 7–6
Win	18.	1979	Toronto, Canada	Hard	(United States) Peter Fleming	(Switzerland) Heinz Günthardt (South Africa) Bob Hewitt	6–7, 7–6, 6–1
Win	19.	1979	US Open, New York City	Hard	(United States) Peter Fleming	(United States) Robert Lutz (United States) Stan Smith	6–2, 6–4
Win	20.	1979	San Francisco, US (2)	Carpet (i)	(United States) Peter Fleming	(Poland) Wojciech Fibak (South Africa) Frew McMillan	6–1, 6–4
Win	21.	1979	Stockholm, Sweden	Hard (i)	(United States) Peter Fleming	(Poland) Wojciech Fibak (Netherlands) Tom Okker	6–4, 6–4
Win	22.	1979	Wembley, United Kingdom (2)	Carpet (i)	(United States) Peter Fleming	(Czechoslovakia) Tomáš Šmíd (United States) Stan Smith	6–2, 6–3
Win	23.	1979	Bologna, Italy (2)	Carpet (i)	(United States) Peter Fleming	(United States) Fritz Buehning (United States) Ferdi Taygan	6–1, 6–1
Win	24.	1979	Masters, New York City (2)	Carpet (i)	(United States) Peter Fleming	(Poland) Wojciech Fibak (Netherlands) Tom Okker	6–3, 7–6, 6–1
Win	25.	1980	Philadelphia, US	Carpet (i)	(United States) Peter Fleming	(United States) Brian Gottfried (Mexico) Raúl Ramírez	6–3, 7–6
Win	26.	1980	Memphis, US	Carpet (i)	(United States) Brian Gottfried	(Australia) Rod Frawley (Czechoslovakia) Tomáš Šmíd	6–3, 6–7, 7–6
Win	27.	1980	Milan, Italy (2)	Carpet (i)	(United States) Peter Fleming	(Rhodesia) Andrew Pattison (United States) Butch Walts	6–2, 6–7, 6–2
Win	28.	1980	WCT ToC, Forest Hills, US	Clay	(United States) Peter Fleming	(Australia) Peter McNamara (Australia) Paul McNamee	6–2, 5–7, 6–2
Win	29.	Aug 1980	South Orange, New Jersey, US (3)	Clay	(United States) Bill Maze	(United States) Fritz Buehning (United States) Van Winitsky	7–6, 6–4
Win	30.	1980	San Francisco, US (3)	Carpet (i)	(United States) Peter Fleming	(United States) Gene Mayer (United States) Sandy Mayer	6–1, 6–4
Win	31.	1980	Maui, US	Hard	(United States) Peter Fleming	(United States) Victor Amaya (United States) Hank Pfister	7–6, 6–7, 6–2
Win	32.	1980	Brisbane, Australia	Grass	(United States) Matt Mitchell	(Australia) Phil Dent (Australia) Rod Frawley	8–6
Win	33.	1980	Sydney Indoor, Australia	Hard (i)	(United States) Peter Fleming	(United States) Tim Gullikson (South Africa) Johan Kriek	4–6, 6–1, 6–2
Win	34.	1980	Wembley, United Kingdom (3)	Carpet (i)	(United States) Peter Fleming	(United States) Bill Scanlon (United States) Eliot Teltscher	7–5, 6–3
Win	35.	1980	Masters, New York City (3)	Carpet (i)	(United States) Peter Fleming	(Australia) Peter McNamara (Australia) Paul McNamee	6–4, 6–3
Win	36.	1981	Las Vegas, US	Hard	(United States) Peter Fleming	(United States) Tracy Delatte (United States) Trey Waltke	6–3, 7–6
Win	37.	1981	WCT Tournament of Champions, Forest Hills, US (2)	Clay	(United States) Peter Fleming	(Australia) John Fitzgerald (United States) Andy Kohlberg	6–4, 6–4
Win	38.	1981	Wimbledon, London, UK (2)	Grass	(United States) Peter Fleming	(United States) Robert Lutz (United States) Stan Smith	6–4, 6–4, 6–4
Win	39.	1981	Cincinnati, US	Hard	(United States) Ferdi Taygan	(United States) Robert Lutz (United States) Stan Smith	7–6, 6–3
Win	40.	1981	US Open, New York City (2)	Hard	(United States) Peter Fleming	(Switzerland) Heinz Günthardt (Australia) Peter McNamara	DEF
Win	41.	1981	San Francisco, US (4)	Carpet (i)	(United States) Peter Fleming	(Australia) Mark Edmondson (United States) Sherwood Stewart	7–6, 6–4
Win	42.	1981	Sydney Indoor, Australia (2)	Hard (i)	(United States) Peter Fleming	(United States) Sherwood Stewart (United States) Ferdi Taygan	6–7, 7–6, 6–1
Win	43.	1981	Masters, New York City (4)	Carpet (i)	(United States) Peter Fleming	(South Africa) Kevin Curren (United States) Steve Denton	6–3, 6–3
Win	44.	1982	Philadelphia, US (2)	Carpet (i)	(United States) Peter Fleming	(United States) Sherwood Stewart (United States) Ferdi Taygan	7–6, 6–4
Win	45.	1982	London/Queen's Club, United Kingdom	Grass	(United States) Peter Rennert	(United States) Victor Amaya (United States) Hank Pfister	7–6, 7–5
Win	46.	1982	Cincinnati, US (2)	Hard	(United States) Peter Fleming	(United States) Steve Denton (Australia) Mark Edmondson	6–2, 6–3
Win	47.	1982	Sydney Indoor, Australia (3)	Hard (i)	(United States) Peter Rennert	(United States) Steve Denton (Australia) Mark Edmondson	6–3, 7–6
Win	48.	1982	Wembley, United Kingdom (4)	Carpet (i)	(United States) Peter Fleming	(Switzerland) Heinz Günthardt (Czechoslovakia) Tomáš Šmíd	7–6, 6–4
Win	49.	1982	Masters, New York City (5)	Carpet (i)	(United States) Peter Fleming	(United States) Sherwood Stewart (United States) Ferdi Taygan	7–5, 6–3
Win	50.	1983	Los Angeles, US	Hard	(United States) Peter Fleming	(United States) Sandy Mayer (United States) Ferdi Taygan	6–1, 6–2
Win	51.	1983	Wimbledon, London, UK (3)	Grass	(United States) Peter Fleming	(United States) Tim Gullikson (United States) Tom Gullikson	6–4, 6–3, 6–4
Win	52.	1983	US Open, New York City (3)	Hard	(United States) Peter Fleming	(United States) Fritz Buehning (United States) Van Winitsky	6–3, 6–4, 6–2
Win	53.	1983	San Francisco, US (5)	Carpet (i)	(United States) Peter Fleming	(Czechoslovakia) Ivan Lendl (United States) Vincent Van Patten	6–1, 6–2
Win	54.	1983	Wembley, United Kingdom (5)	Carpet (i)	(United States) Peter Fleming	(United States) Steve Denton (United States) Sherwood Stewart	6–3, 6–4
Win	55.	1983	Masters, New York City (6)	Carpet (i)	(United States) Peter Fleming	(Czechoslovakia) Pavel Složil (Czechoslovakia) Tomáš Šmíd	6–2, 6–2
Win	56.	1984	Philadelphia, US (3)	Carpet (i)	(United States) Peter Fleming	(France) Henri Leconte (France) Yannick Noah	6–2, 6–3
Win	57.	1984	Richmond WCT, US (2)	Carpet (i)	(United States) Patrick McEnroe	(South Africa) Kevin Curren (United States) Steve Denton	7–6, 6–2
Win	58.	1984	Madrid, Spain	Carpet (i)	(United States) Peter Fleming	(United States) Fritz Buehning (United States) Ferdi Taygan	6–3, 6–3
Win	59.	1984	Wimbledon, London, UK (4)	Grass	(United States) Peter Fleming	(Australia) Pat Cash (Australia) Paul McNamee	6–2, 5–7, 6–2, 3–6, 6–3
Win	60.	1984	Toronto, Canada (2)	Hard	(United States) Peter Fleming	(Australia) John Fitzgerald (Australia) Kim Warwick	6–4, 6–2
Win	61.	1984	San Francisco, US (6)	Carpet (i)	(United States) Peter Fleming	(United States) Mike De Palmer (United States) Sammy Giammalva Jr.	6–3, 6–4
Win	62.	Jan 1985	Masters, New York City (7)	Carpet (i)	(United States) Peter Fleming	(Australia) Mark Edmondson (United States) Sherwood Stewart	6–3, 6–1
Win	63.	1985	Houston, US	Carpet (i)	(United States) Peter Fleming	(United States) Hank Pfister (United States) Ben Testerman	6–3, 6–2
Win	64.	1985	Dallas, US	Carpet (i)	(United States) Peter Fleming	(Australia) Mark Edmondson (United States) Sherwood Stewart	6–3, 6–1
Win	65.	1986	Stratton Mountain, US	Hard	(United States) Peter Fleming	(United States) Paul Annacone (South Africa) Christo van Rensburg	6–3, 3–6, 6–3
Win	66.	1986	San Francisco, US (7)	Carpet (i)	(United States) Peter Fleming	(United States) Mike De Palmer (United States) Gary Donnelly	6–4, 7–6
Win	67.	1986	Paris Indoor, France	Carpet (i)	(United States) Peter Fleming	(Iran) Mansour Bahrami (Uruguay) Diego Pérez	6–3, 6–2
Win	68.	1986	Wembley, United Kingdom (6)	Carpet (i)	(United States) Peter Fleming	(United States) Sherwood Stewart (Australia) Kim Warwick	3–6, 7–6, 6–2
Win	69.	1988	Los Angeles, US (2)	Hard	(Australia) Mark Woodforde	(Australia) Peter Doohan (United States) Jim Grabb	6–4, 6–4
Win	70.	1988	San Francisco, US (8)	Carpet (i)	(Australia) Mark Woodforde	(United States) Scott Davis (United States) Tim Pawsat	6–4, 7–6
Win	71.	1989	Milan, Italy (3)	Carpet (i)	(Switzerland) Jakob Hlasek	(Switzerland) Heinz Günthardt (Hungary) Balázs Taróczy	6–3, 6–4
Win	72.	1989	US Open, New York City (4)	Hard	(Australia) Mark Woodforde	(United States) Ken Flach (United States) Robert Seguso	6–4, 4–6, 6–3, 6–3
Win	73.	1989	Wembley, United Kingdom (7)	Carpet (i)	(Switzerland) Jakob Hlasek	(United Kingdom) Jeremy Bates (South Africa) Kevin Curren	6–1, 7–6
Win	74.	1992	Brussels, Belgium	Carpet (i)	(Germany) Boris Becker	(France) Guy Forget (Switzerland) Jakob Hlasek	6–3, 6–2
Win	75.	1992	Wimbledon, London, UK (5)	Grass	(Germany) Michael Stich	(United States) Jim Grabb (United States) Richey Reneberg	5–7, 7–6, 3–6, 7–6, 19–17
Win	76.	1992	Paris Indoor, France (2)	Carpet (i)	(United States) Patrick McEnroe	(United States) Patrick Galbraith (South Africa) Danie Visser	6–4, 6–2
Win	77.	2006	San Jose, US (9)	Hard (i)	(Sweden) Jonas Björkman	(United States) Paul Goldstein (United States) Jim Thomas	7–6, 4–6, [10–7]

==== Runner-ups: (22) ====
Result	No.	Date	Tournament	Surface	Partner	Opponent	Score
Loss	1.	1978	Washington Indoor, US	Carpet (i)	(United States) Arthur Ashe	(United States) Robert Lutz (United States) Stan Smith	7–6, 5–7, 1–6
Loss	2.	1978	Wimbledon, London, UK	Grass	(United States) Peter Fleming	(South Africa) Bob Hewitt (South Africa) Frew McMillan	1–6, 4–6, 2–6
Loss	3.	1978	Maui, US	Hard	(United States) Peter Fleming	(United States) Tim Gullikson (United States) Tom Gullikson	6–7, 6–7
Loss	4.	1979	Philadelphia, US	Carpet (i)	(United States) Peter Fleming	(Poland) Wojciech Fibak (Netherlands) Tom Okker	7–5, 1–6, 3–6
Loss	5.	1980	Monte Carlo, Monaco	Clay	(United States) Vitas Gerulaitis	(Italy) Paolo Bertolucci (Italy) Adriano Panatta	2–6, 7–5, 3–6
Loss	6.	1980	US Open, New York City	Hard	(United States) Peter Fleming	(United States) Robert Lutz (United States) Stan Smith	6–7, 6–3, 1–6, 6–3, 3–6
Loss	7.	1981	Milan, Italy	Carpet (i)	(United States) Peter Rennert	(United States) Brian Gottfried (Mexico) Raúl Ramírez	6–7, 3–6
Loss	8.	1981	Frankfurt, Germany	Carpet (i)	(United States) Vitas Gerulaitis	(United States) Brian Teacher (United States) Butch Walts	5–7, 7–6, 5–7
Loss	9.	1981	Los Angeles, United States	Hard	(United States) Ferdi Taygan	(United States) Butch Walts (United States) Tom Gullikson	4–6, 4–6
Loss	10.	1981	Montreal, Canada	Hard	(United States) Peter Fleming	(Mexico) Raúl Ramírez (United States) Ferdi Taygan	6–2, 6–7, 4–6
Loss	11.	1981	Wembley, United Kingdom	Carpet (i)	(United States) Peter Fleming	(United States) Sherwood Stewart (United States) Ferdi Taygan	5–7, 7–6, 4–6
Loss	12.	1982	Memphis, US	Carpet (i)	(United States) Peter Fleming	(South Africa) Kevin Curren (United States) Steve Denton	6–7, 6–4, 2–6
Loss	13.	1982	Wimbledon, London, UK	Grass	(United States) Peter Fleming	(Australia) Paul McNamee (Australia) Peter McNamara	3–6, 2–6
Loss	14.	1982	Toronto, Canada	Hard	(United States) Peter Fleming	(United States) Steve Denton (Australia) Mark Edmondson	7–6, 5–7, 2–6
Loss	15.	1982	Tokyo Indoor, Japan	Carpet (i)	(United States) Peter Rennert	(United States) Tim Gullikson (United States) Tom Gullikson	4–6, 6–3, 6–7
Loss	16.	1983	Philadelphia, US	Carpet (i)	(United States) Peter Fleming	(South Africa) Kevin Curren (United States) Steve Denton	4–6, 6–7
Loss	17.	1983	Sydney Indoor, Australia	Hard (i)	(United States) Peter Rennert	(Australia) Mark Edmondson (United States) Sherwood Stewart	2–6, 4–6
Loss	18.	1986	Los Angeles, US	Hard	(United States) Peter Fleming	(Sweden) Stefan Edberg (Sweden) Anders Järryd	6–3, 5–7, 6–7
Loss	19.	1989	Lyon, France	Carpet (i)	(Switzerland) Jakob Hlasek	(West Germany) Eric Jelen (Denmark) Michael Mortensen	2–6, 6–3, 3–6
Loss	20.	1991	Basel, Switzerland	Hard (i)	(Czechoslovakia) Petr Korda	(Switzerland) Jakob Hlasek (United States) Patrick McEnroe	6–3, 6–7, 6–7
Loss	21.	1992	Rosmalen, Netherlands	Grass	(Germany) Michael Stich	(United States) Jim Grabb (United States) Richey Reneberg	4–6, 7–6, 4–6
Loss	22.	1992	Toronto, Canada	Hard	(United States) Andre Agassi	(United States) Patrick Galbraith (South Africa) Danie Visser	4–6, 4–6

== Senior tour titles ==
=== Singles finals: 39 (25 titles, 14 runners-up) ===
Result	No.	Year	Tournament	Opponent	Score
Win	1–0	2000	Dublin	(France) Henri Leconte	6–4, 6–3
Win	2–0	2000	Naples, Florida	(France) Henri Leconte	6–0, 0–1 retired
Win	3–0	2000	Richmond, Virginia	(Ecuador) Andrés Gómez	6–1, 6–2
Win	4–0	2000	Raleigh, North Carolina	(Sweden) Mats Wilander	6–1, 6–4
Loss	4–1	2000	San Diego, California	(Australia) Pat Cash	6–3, 7–5
Win	5–1	2000	Chicago, IL	(Sweden) Mats Wilander	6–2, 6–4
Win	6–1	2000	Palo Alto, California	(Argentina) José Luis Clerc	6–2, 6–3
Win	7–1	2000	Geneva	(France) Guy Forget	7–6, 6–2
Win	8–1	2000	Singapore	(Iran) Mansour Bahrami	6–2, 6–2
Win	9–1	2000	Hong Kong	(Sweden) Mats Wilander	6–1, 6–3
Win	10–1	2000	Frankfurt	(France) Henri Leconte	6–1, 6–3
Loss	10–2	2000	London	(Australia) Pat Cash	6–7, 7–5, [14–12]
Win	11–2	2001	Dublin	(France) Guy Forget	7–6^{(9–7)}, 7–6^{(8–6)}
Win	12–2	2001	Newport Beach, California	(Australia) Pat Cash	7–6(4), 5–7, [10–7]
Win	13–2	2002	Algarve	(Ecuador) Andrés Gómez	6–2, 6–3
Win	14–2	2002	Eindhoven	(Czech Republic) Petr Korda	3–6, 6–3, [10–3]
Loss	14–3	2002	Monte Carlo	(Czech Republic) Petr Korda	6–3, 6–4
Win	15–3	2003	Brussels	(France) Guy Forget	6–2, 6–7^{(10–12)}, [10–6]
Loss	15–4	2003	Algarve	(Germany) Michael Stich	6–4, 6–0
Win	16–4	2003	Eindhoven	(Czech Republic) Petr Korda	2–6, 6–3, [10–8]
Win	17–4	2003	Monte Carlo	(Czech Republic) Petr Korda	6–2, 6–2
Win	18–4	2003	London	(France) Guy Forget	7–6, 6–2
Win	19–4	2005	Frankfurt	(France) Cédric Pioline	6–2, 6–4
Win	20–4	2005	Algarve	(Australia) Pat Cash	6–1, 7–5
Loss	20–5	2005	Essen	(Croatia) Goran Ivanišević	6–3, 6–4
Loss	20–6	2006	Algarve	(Chile) Marcelo Ríos	6–2, 6–4
Loss	20–7	2006	Frankfurt	(Croatia) Goran Ivanišević	7–6^{(14–12)}, 7–6^{(7–1)}
Win	21–7	2008	Luxembourg	(France) Henri Leconte	6–1, 6–4
Loss	21–8	2010	Delray Beach	(Australia) Patrick Rafter	7–6^{(7–4)}, 7–6^{(7–1)}
Win	22–8	2010	Paris	(France) Guy Forget	7–5, 6–4
Loss	22–9	2010	Sydney	(Australia) Patrick Rafter	6–2, 6–2
Win	23–9	2012	Stockholm	(Sweden) Magnus Larsson	6–3, 3–6, [10–7]
Loss	23–10	2013	Delray Beach	(Spain) Carlos Moyá	6–4, 6–2
Loss	23–11	2013	Stockholm	(Sweden) Stefan Edberg	6–4, 6–3
Win	24–11	2015	Verona/Modena	(Spain) Sergi Bruguera	6–4, 6–3
Loss	24–12	2015	Monterrey	(United States) Pete Sampras	3–6, 6–7^{(2–7)}
Win	25–12	2016	Stockholm	(Austria) Thomas Muster	6–2, 6–2
Loss	25–13	2016	Seoul	(Russia) Marat Safin	5–7, 5–7
Loss	25–14	2016	Bari	(Sweden) Thomas Enqvist	2–6, 6–7^{(5–7)}

=== Legends over 45 doubles ===
Result	Year	Championship	Surface	Partner	Opponents	Score
Win	2007	French Open	Clay	(Sweden) Järryd	(Australia) Fitzgerald (Argentina) Vilas	6–1, 6–2
Win	2008	French Open	Clay	(Sweden) Järryd	(Iran) Bahrami (France) Leconte	6–4, 7–6^{(7–2)}
Win	2009	French Open	Clay	(Sweden) Järryd	(Iran) Bahrami (France) Leconte	7–6^{(7–2)}, 6–1
Win	2010	French Open	Clay	(Ecuador) Gómez	(Iran) Bahrami (France) Leconte	6–1, 6–1
Loss	2011	French Open	Clay	(Ecuador) Gómez	(France) Forget (France) Leconte	6–3, 5–7, [10–8]
Win	2012	French Open	Clay	(United States) McEnroe	(France) Forget (France) Leconte	7–6^{(7–5)}, 6–3

- 2008: Champions Cup Boston – defeated Aaron Krickstein 5–7, 6–3, [10–5]
- 2009: Rio Champions Cup – defeated Jim Courier 6–2, 6–3

== Performance timelines ==
Key
W	F	SF	QF	#R	RR	Q#	P#	DNQ	A	Z#	PO	G	S	B	NMS	NTI	P	NH

(W) winner; (F) finalist; (SF) semifinalist; (QF) quarterfinalist; (#R) rounds 4, 3, 2, 1; (RR) round-robin stage; (Q#) qualification round; (P#) preliminary round; (DNQ) did not qualify; (A) absent; (Z#) Davis/Fed Cup Zonal Group (with number indication) or (PO) play-off; (G) gold, (S) silver or (B) bronze Olympic/Paralympic medal; (NMS) not a Masters tournament; (NTI) not a Tier I tournament; (P) postponed; (NH) not held; (SR) strike rate (events won / competed); (W–L) win–loss record.

=== Singles ===
Tournament	1976	1977	1978	1979	1980	1981	1982	1983	1984	1985	1986	1987	1988	1989	1990	1991	1992	1994	SR	W–L	Win %
Grand Slam tournaments
Australian Open	A	A	A	A	A	A	A	SF	A	QF	NH	A	A	QF	4R	A	QF	A	0 / 5	18–5	78%
French Open	A	2R	A	A	3R	QF	A	QF	F	SF	A	1R	4R	A	A	1R	1R	A	0 / 10	25–10	71%
Wimbledon	A	SF	1R	4R	F	W	F	W	W	QF	A	A	2R	SF	1R	4R	SF	A	3 / 14	59–11	84%
US Open	A	4R	SF	W	W	W	SF	4R	W	F	1R	QF	2R	2R	SF	3R	4R	A	4 / 16	66–12	85%
Win–loss	0–0	9–3	5–2	9–1	15–2	18–1	11–2	18–3	20–1	18–4	0–1	4–2	5–3	10–3	8–3	5–3	12–4	0–0	7 / 45	168–38	82%
Year-end championships
Masters Grand Prix	A	A	W	SF	RR	SF	F	W	W	1R	A	A	A	SF	A	A	A	A	3 / 9	19–11	63%
WCT Finals	A	A	A	W	F	W	F	W	W	QF	A	F	A	W	not held				5 / 9	21–4	84%
Grand Prix / WCT															ATP Super 9						
Philadelphia	A	A	QF	QF	F	A	W	W	W	W	A	F	A	A	not Super 9				4 / 8	34–4	89%
Indian Wells	A	A	A	2R	A	A	A	A	A	A	A	A	A	A	A	2R	A	A	0 / 2	2–2	50%
Miami	not held									A	A	A	A	A	A	A	4R	A	0 / 1	2–1	66%
Monte Carlo	A	A	A	A	QF	A	A	A	A	A	A	A	A	A	A	A	A	A	0 / 1	2–1	66%
Las Vegas	A	A	2R	SF	QF	A	A	1R	NH	A	not held								0 / 4	6–4	60%
Forest Hills	A	A	SF	RR	F	2R	SF	W	W	F	A	A	1R	A	EX	not held			2 / 8	27–7	79%
Hamburg	A	A	A	A	A	A	A	A	A	A	A	A	A	A	A	A	2R	A	0 / 1	1–1	50%
Rome	A	A	A	A	A	A	A	A	A	A	A	SF	A	A	A	A	A	A	0 / 1	4–1	80%
Canada	A	3R	QF	F	2R	3R	SF	SF	W	W	3R	QF	QF	F	QF	3R	QF	A	2 / 16	44–14	76%
Cincinnati	A	QF	A	A	A	W	SF	F	1R	A	A	1R	A	A	3R	A	A	A	1 / 7	19–6	76%
Stockholm	A	A	W	W	F	A	A	A	W	W	A	A	A	A	3R	A	A	A	4 / 6	27–2	93%
Wembley	A	A	W	W	W	F	W	W	A	A	1R	A	A	SF	not Super 9				5 / 8	32–3	91%
Paris	A	A	A	A	A	A	A	not held			QF	A	QF	SF	2R	2R	2R	A	0 / 4	9–6	60%
National representation
Davis Cup	A	A	W	W	P	W	W	1R	F	A	A	PO	Z1	SF	A	F	W	A	5 / 9	41–8	84%
Career statistics
	1976	1977	1978	1979	1980	1981	1982	1983	1984	1985	1986	1987	1988	1989	1990	1991	1992	1994	Career		
Titles	0	0	5	10	9	10	5	7	13	8	3	0	2	3	1	1	0	0	77		
Finals	0	0	7	13	15	11	10	10	14	10	3	5	3	5	1	2	0	0	109		
Overall W–L	1–1	28–14	79–19	95–14	84–18	76–10	71–9	63–11	82–3	71–9	22–5	34–12	30–10	47–11	33–15	33–18	32–18	0–1	881–198		
Win %	50%	67%	81%	87%	82%	88%	89%	85%	96%	89%	81%	74%	75%	81%	69%	65%	64%	0%	81.65%		
Year-end ranking	264	21	4	3	2	1	1	1	1	2	14	10	11	4	13	28	20	1219	$12,552,132		

=== Doubles ===
Tournament	1974	1975	1976	1977	1978	1979	1980	1981	1982	1983	1984	1985	1986	1987	1988	1989	1990	1991	1992	1994	2006	SR	W–L	Win %
Grand Slam tournaments
Australian Open	A	A	A	A	A	A	A	A	A	3R	A	A	NH	A	A	SF	A	A	A	A	A	0 / 2	5–2	71%
French Open	A	A	A	2R	A	A	A	A	A	A	A	A	A	A	A	A	A	A	QF	A	A	0 / 2	4–2	67%
Wimbledon	A	A	A	Q2	F	W	SF	W	F	W	W	SF	A	A	A	3R	A	2R	W	A	A	5 / 11	51–6	89%
US Open	1R	2R	1R	2R	QF	W	F	W	QF	W	SF	A	A	A	A	W	1R	3R	SF	A	A	4 / 15	45–11	80%
Win–loss	0–1	0–1	0–1	2–2	8–2	12–0	9–2	11–0	8–2	13–1	10–1	4–1	0–0	0–0	0–0	12–2	0–1	3–2	13–2	0–0	0–0	9 / 30	105–21	83%
Year-end championships
Masters Grand Prix	NH	A	A	A	W	W	W	W	W	W	W	A	A	A	A	A	A	A	A	A	A	7 / 7	14–0	100%
National representation
Davis Cup	A	A	A	A	W	W	P	W	W	1R	F	A	A	PO	Z1	SF	A	F	W	A	A	5 / 9	18–2	90%
Career statistics
Titles	0	0	0	0	8	17	11	8	6	6	7	2	4	0	2	3	0	0	3	0	1	78		
Finals	0	0	0	0	11	18	13	13	10	8	7	2	5	0	2	4	0	1	5	0	1	100		
Overall W–L	0–1	0–1	0–1	16–10	56–14	80–5	57–5	55–8	47–6	43–8	40–5	15–2	23–3	8–5	10–2	30–7	2–3	8–6	35–8	2–1	5–1	532–102		
Win %	0%	0%	0%	62%	80%	94%	92%	87%	89%	84%	89%	88%	88%	62%	83%	81%	40%	57%	81%	67%	83%	83.91%		
Year-end ranking	no ranking		346	69	2	1	1	1	1	1	2	34	12	82	49	3	347	150	9	396	242	$571,885		

=== Mixed doubles ===
Tournament	1975	...	1977	1978	...	1999	SR	W–L	Win %
Grand Slam tournaments
Australian Open	A		A	A		A	0 / 0	0–0	–
French Open	A		W	A		A	1 / 1	5–0	100%
Wimbledon	A		QF	2R		SF	0 / 3	7–2	78%
US Open	2R		1R	3R		A	0 / 3	3–3	50%
Win–loss	1–1		8–2	3–2		3–0	1 / 7	15–5	75%

== Record against No. 1 players ==
McEnroe's match record against players who have been ranked world No. 1.

Player	Years	Matches	Record	Win %	Hard	Clay	Grass	Carpet	Ref.
(Romania) Ilie Năstase	1977–1984	9	6–3	67%	2–0	0–2	0–0	4–1	
(United States) Jimmy Connors	1977–1991	34	20–14	59%	7–4	1–3	3–4	9–3	
(Sweden) Stefan Edberg	1984–1992	13	7–6	54%	4–3	0–0	0–2	3–1	
(Sweden) Mats Wilander	1982–1989	13	7–6	54%	2–1	1–3	1–1	3–1	
(Sweden) Björn Borg	1978–1981	14	7–7	50%	3–1	0–0	1–1	3–5	
(United States) Andre Agassi	1986–1992	4	2–2	50%	1–1	0–0	0–1	1–0	
(Australia) John Newcombe	1978	2	1–1	50%	0–1	1–0	0–0	0–0	
(Czech Republic) / (United States) Ivan Lendl	1980–1992	36	15–21	42%	4–10	2–4	1–1	8–6	
(United States) Jim Courier	1988–1992	3	1–2	33%	0–2	0–0	0–0	1–0	
(Germany) Boris Becker	1985–1992	10	2–8	20%	1–2	0–0	0–0	1–6	
(United States) Pete Sampras	1990–1991	3	0–3	0%	0–2	0–0	0–0	0–1	
Total	1977–1992	141	68–73	48%	24–27 (47%)	5–12 (29%)	6–10 (38%)	33–24 (58%)	

== Top 10 wins ==
Season	1976	1977	1978	1979	1980	1981	1982	1983	1984	1985	1986	1987	1988	1989	1990	1991	1992	1994	Total
Wins	0	3	7	14	12	11	10	11	24	10	3	4	3	7	5	0	4	0	128

#	Player	Rank	Event	Surface	Rd	Score	MR
1977
1.	(Poland) Wojciech Fibak	10	Indianapolis, United States	Clay	2R	6–7, 6–1. 6–2	55
2.	(United States) Eddie Dibbs	9	US Open, New York, United States	Clay	3R	6–2, 4–6, 6–4	30
3.	(Spain) Manuel Orantes	5	San Francisco, United States	Carpet (i)	3R	6–4, 6–4	25
1978
4.	(Spain) Manuel Orantes	7	Philadelphia, United States	Carpet (i)	3R	7–6, 6–2	18
5.	(United States) Eddie Dibbs	5	San Francisco, United States	Carpet (i)	SF	6–4, 7–6	13
6.	(Sweden) Björn Borg	2	Stockholm, Sweden	Hard (i)	SF	6–3, 6–4	6
7.	(Italy) Corrado Barazzutti	10	Wembley, London, United Kingdom	Carpet (i)	QF	6–0, 7–6	6
8.	(United States) Jimmy Connors	1	Masters, New York, United States	Carpet (i)	RR	7–5, 3–0, ret.	4
9.	(United States) Harold Solomon	9	Masters, New York, United States	Carpet (i)	RR	6–3, 6–2	4
10.	(United States) Eddie Dibbs	6	Masters, New York, United States	Carpet (i)	SF	6–1, 6–4	4
1979
11.	(Argentina) Guillermo Vilas	3	Pepsi Grand Slam, Boca Raton, United States	Clay	3rd/4th	6–4, 6–2	4
12.	(Sweden) Björn Borg	2	New Orleans, United States	Carpet (i)	SF	5–7, 6–1, 7–6	5
13.	(United States) Roscoe Tanner	9	New Orleans, United States	Carpet (i)	F	6–4, 6–2	5
14.	(United States) Vitas Gerulaitis	4	Milan, Italy	Carpet (i)	SF	6–0, 6–3	5
15.	(United States) Jimmy Connors	2	WCT Finals, Dallas, United States	Carpet (i)	SF	6–1, 6–4, 6–4	3
16.	(Sweden) Björn Borg	1	WCT Finals, Dallas, United States	Carpet (i)	F	7–5, 4–6, 6–2, 7–6	3
17.	(United States) Roscoe Tanner	6	Queen's Club, London, United Kingdom	Grass	SF	6–4, 7–5	4
18.	(United States) Vitas Gerulaitis	6	Toronto, Canada	Hard	SF	6–3, 6–3	3
19.	(United States) Jimmy Connors	2	US Open, New York, United States	Hard	SF	6–3, 6–3, 7–5	3
20.	(United States) Vitas Gerulaitis	5	US Open, New York, United States	Hard	F	7–5, 6–3. 6–3	3
21.	(Argentina) Guillermo Vilas	6	Davis Cup, Memphis, United States	Carpet (i)	RR	6–2, 6–3, 6–2	3
22.	(United States) Harold Solomon	8	Wembley, London, United Kingdom	Carpet (i)	F	6–3, 6–4, 7–5	3
23.	(United States) Harold Solomon	8	Masters, New York, United States	Carpet (i)	RR	6–3, 7–5	3
24.	(Argentina) Guillermo Vilas	6	Masters, New York, United States	Carpet (i)	RR	6–2, 6–3	3
1980
25.	(United States) Roscoe Tanner	4	Richmond, United States	Carpet (i)	F	6–1, 6–2	3
26.	(Argentina) Guillermo Vilas	6	Pepsi Grand Slam, Boca Raton, United States	Clay	3rd/4th	8–7^{(7–5)}	2
27.	(United States) Jimmy Connors	3	Memphis, United States	Carpet (i)	F	7–6^{(8–6)}, 7–6^{(7–4)}	2
28.	(United States) Peter Fleming	9	Wimbledon, London, United Kingdom	Grass	QF	6–3, 6–2, 6–2	2
29.	(United States) Jimmy Connors	3	Wimbledon, London, United Kingdom	Grass	SF	6–3, 3–6, 6–3, 6–4	2
30.	(Czechoslovakia) Ivan Lendl	9	US Open, New York, United States	Hard	QF	4–6, 6–3, 6–2, 7–5	2
31.	(United States) Jimmy Connors	3	US Open, New York, United States	Hard	SF	6–4, 5–7, 0–6, 6–3, 7–6^{(7–3)}	2
32.	(Sweden) Björn Borg	1	US Open, New York, United States	Hard	F	7–6^{(7–4)}, 6–1, 6–7^{(5–7)}, 5–7, 6–4	2
33.	(United States) Vitas Gerulaitis	8	Sydney, Australia	Hard (i)	F	6–3, 6–4, 7–5	2
34.	(United States) Harold Solomon	7	Wembley, London, United Kingdom	Carpet (i)	SF	6–3, 6–2	3
35.	(United States) Gene Mayer	5	Wembley, London, United Kingdom	Carpet (i)	F	6–4, 6–3, 6–3	3
36.	(United States) Eliot Teltscher	10	WCT Challenge Cup, Montreal, Canada	Carpet (i)	SF	2–6, 7–6, 6–2	2
1981
37.	(United States) Brian Teacher	10	Pepsi Grand Slam, Boca Raton, United States	Clay	SF	6–3, 6–1	2
38.	(Argentina) Guillermo Vilas	5	Pepsi Grand Slam, Boca Raton, United States	Clay	F	6–7^{(5–7)}, 6–4, 6–0	2
39.	(Sweden) Björn Borg	1	Milan, Italy	Carpet (i)	F	7–6^{(7–2)}, 6–4	2
40.	(United States) Brian Teacher	10	Queen's Club, London, United Kingdom	Grass	SF	6–3, 6–4	2
41.	(Sweden) Björn Borg	1	Wimbledon, London, United Kingdom	Grass	F	4–6, 7–6^{(7–1)}, 7–6^{(7–4)}, 6–4	2
42.	(Sweden) Björn Borg	2	US Open, New York, United States	Hard	F	4–6, 6–2, 6–4, 6–3	1
43.	(United States) Eliot Teltscher	10	Sydney, Australia	Hard (i)	SF	7–5, 7–6	1
44.	(United States) Roscoe Tanner	9	Sydney, Australia	Hard (i)	F	6–4, 7–5, 6–2	1
45.	(Argentina) Guillermo Vilas	6	Davis Cup, Cincinnati, United States	Carpet (i)	RR	6–3, 6–2, 6–2	1
46.	(Argentina) José Luis Clerc	5	Davis Cup, Cincinnati, United States	Carpet (i)	RR	7–5, 5–7, 6–3, 3–6, 6–3	1
47.	(United States) Jimmy Connors	3	Masters, New York, United States	Carpet (i)	RR	6–2, 7–5	1
1982
48.	(United States) Vitas Gerulaitis	9	Philadelphia, United States	Carpet (i)	SF	6–1, 6–2, 6–4	1
49.	(United States) Jimmy Connors	3	Philadelphia, United States	Carpet (i)	F	6–3, 6–3, 6–1	1
50.	(United States) Gene Mayer	8	Memphis, United States	Carpet (i)	SF	7–5, 6–3	1
51.	(United States) Gene Mayer	6	US Open, New York, United States	Hard	QF	4–6, 7–6^{(7–4)}, 6–3, 4–6, 6–1	1
52.	(United States) Jimmy Connors	1	San Francisco, United States	Carpet (i)	F	6–1, 6–3	3
53.	(Australia) Peter McNamara	8	Davis Cup, Perth, Australia	Carpet (i)	RR	6–4, 4–6, 6–2, 6–4	2
54.	(United States) Gene Mayer	6	Sydney, Australia	Hard (i)	F	6–4, 6–1, 6–4	2
55.	(France) Yannick Noah	9	Davis Cup, Grenoble, France	Clay (i)	RR	12–10, 1–6, 3–6, 6–2, 6–3	1
56.	(Argentina) José Luis Clerc	6	Masters, New York, United States	Carpet (i)	QF	6–3, 6–4	1
57.	(Argentina) Guillermo Vilas	4	Masters, New York, United States	Carpet (i)	SF	6–3, 6–3	1
1983
58.	(Czechoslovakia) Ivan Lendl	2	Philadelphia, United States	Carpet (i)	F	4–6, 7–6^{(9–7)}, 6–4, 6–3	3
59.	(United States) Vitas Gerulaitis	9	WCT Finals, Dallas, United States	Carpet (i)	SF	6–3, 6–2, 6–2	2
60.	(Czechoslovakia) Ivan Lendl	1	WCT Finals, Dallas, United States	Carpet (i)	F	6–2, 4–6, 6–3, 6–7^{(5–7)}, 7–6^{(7–0)}	2
61.	(Argentina) Guillermo Vilas	4	Forest Hills, United States	Clay	SF	6–1, 6–1	2
62.	(United States) Vitas Gerulaitis	9	Forest Hills, United States	Clay	F	6–3, 7–5	2
63.	(Czechoslovakia) Ivan Lendl	3	Wimbledon, London, United Kingdom	Grass	SF	7–6, 6–4, 6–4	2
64.	(United States) Jimmy Connors	3	Cincinnati, United States	Hard	SF	6–7, 6–1, 6–4	1
65.	(South Africa) Kevin Curren	7	San Francisco, United States	Carpet (i)	SF	6–7, 6–2, 6–4	1
66.	(United States) Jimmy Connors	3	Wembley, London, United Kingdom	Carpet (i)	F	7–5, 6–1, 6–4	2
67.	(Sweden) Mats Wilander	4	Masters, New York, United States	Carpet (i)	SF	6–2, 6–4	2
68.	(Czechoslovakia) Ivan Lendl	1	Masters, New York, United States	Carpet (i)	F	6–3, 6–4, 6–4	2
1984
69.	(Czechoslovakia) Ivan Lendl	1	Philadelphia, United States	Carpet (i)	F	6–3, 3–6, 6–3, 7–6^{(7–3)}	2
70.	(South Africa) Kevin Curren	8	Madrid, Spain	Carpet (i)	SF	6–2, 7–6	2
71.	(Czechoslovakia) Ivan Lendl	1	Brussels, Belgium	Carpet (i)	F	6–1, 6–3	2
72.	(South Africa) Kevin Curren	10	WCT Finals, Dallas, United States	Carpet (i)	SF	6–3, 6–3, 6–4	1
73.	(United States) Jimmy Connors	3	WCT Finals, Dallas, United States	Carpet (i)	F	6–1, 6–2, 6–3	1
74.	(United States) Jimmy Arias	5	Forest Hills, United States	Clay	SF	6–1, 6–2	1
75.	(Czechoslovakia) Ivan Lendl	2	Forest Hills, United States	Clay	F	6–4, 6–2	1
76.	(Argentina) José Luis Clerc	9	Nations Cup, Düsseldorf, West Germany	Clay	RR	6–3, 6–3	1
77.	(Czechoslovakia) Ivan Lendl	2	Nations Cup, Düsseldorf, West Germany	Clay	F	6–3, 6–2	1
78.	(United States) Jimmy Arias	5	French Open, Paris, France	Clay	QF	6–3, 6–4, 6–4	1
79.	(United States) Jimmy Connors	3	French Open, Paris, France	Clay	SF	7–5, 6–1, 6–2	1
80.	(United States) Jimmy Connors	3	Queen's Club, London, United Kingdom	Grass	SF	6–2, 6–2	2
81.	(United States) Jimmy Connors	3	Wimbledon, London, United Kingdom	Grass	F	6–1, 6–1, 6–2	1
82.	(Argentina) José Luis Clerc	8	Davis Cup, Atlanta, United States	Carpet (i)	RR	6–4, 6–0, 6–2	2
83.	(United States) Jimmy Connors	3	Toronto, Canada	Hard	SF	2–6, 6–2, 6–3	1
84.	(United States) Jimmy Connors	3	US Open, New York, United States	Hard	SF	6–4, 4–6, 7–5, 4–6, 6–3	1
85.	(Czechoslovakia) Ivan Lendl	2	US Open, New York, United States	Hard	F	6–3, 6–4, 6–1	1
86.	(Australia) Pat Cash	10	Davis Cup, Portland, United States	Carpet (i)	RR	6–3, 6–4, 6–1	1
87.	(Sweden) Anders Järryd	6	Stockholm, Sweden	Hard (i)	SF	1–6, 7–6, 6–2	1
88.	(Sweden) Mats Wilander	4	Stockholm, Sweden	Hard (i)	F	6–3, 3–6, 6–2	1
89.	(Sweden) Mats Wilander	4	Davis Cup, Gothenburg, Sweden	Clay (i)	RR	6–3, 5–7, 6–3	1
90.	(Sweden) Anders Järryd	6	Masters, New York, United States	Carpet (i)	QF	2–6, 6–4, 6–2	1
91.	(Sweden) Mats Wilander	4	Masters, New York, United States	Carpet (i)	SF	6–1, 6–1	1
92.	(Czechoslovakia) Ivan Lendl	2	Masters, New York, United States	Carpet (i)	F	7–5, 6–0, 6–4	1
1985
93.	(France) Yannick Noah	10	Philadelphia, United States	Carpet (i)	QF	6–2, 6–4	1
94.	(Sweden) Anders Järryd	6	Milan, Italy	Carpet (i)	F	6–4, 6–1	1
95.	(Sweden) Anders Järryd	9	French Open, Paris, France	Clay	QF	6–7, 6–2, 6–2, 3–6, 7–5	1
96.	(Czechoslovakia) Ivan Lendl	2	Stratton Mountain, United States	Hard	F	7–6^{(7–4)}, 6–2	1
97.	(United States) Jimmmy Connors	4	Montreal, Canada	Hard	SF	6–2, 6–3	1
98.	(Czechoslovakia) Ivan Lendl	2	Montreal, Canada	Hard	F	7–5, 6–3	1
99.	(Sweden) Joakim Nyström	10	US Open, New York, United States	Hard	QF	6–1, 6–0, 7–5	1
100.	(Sweden) Mats Wilander	3	US Open, New York, United States	Hard	SF	3–6, 6–4, 4–6, 6–3, 6–3	1
101.	(Sweden) Stefan Edberg	6	Stockholm, Sweden	Hard (i)	SF	6–3, 7–6	2
102.	(Sweden) Anders Järryd	8	Stockholm, Sweden	Hard (i)	F	6–1, 6–2	2
1986
103.	(Sweden) Stefan Edberg	4	Los Angeles, United States	Hard	F	6–2, 6–3	20
104.	(Sweden) Stefan Edberg	3	San Francisco, United States	Carpet (i)	SF	7–6, 6–2	15
105.	(United States) Jimmy Connors	7	San Francisco, United States	Carpet (i)	F	7–6^{(8–6)}, 6–3	15
1987
106.	(Czechoslovakia) Miloslav Mečíř	6	Rotterdam, Netherlands	Carpet (i)	SF	6–1, 7–5	11
107.	(France) Yannick Noah	4	WCT Finals, Dallas, United States	Carpet (i)	QF	7–6, 6–2, 4–6, 6–3	7
108.	(Sweden) Stefan Edberg	3	WCT Finals, Dallas, United States	Carpet (i)	SF	7–6, 6–7, 7–6, 6–4	7
109.	(France) Henri Leconte	9	Nations Cup, Düsseldorf, West Germany	Clay	RR	2–6, 7–5, 6–1	7
1988
110.	(United States) Brad Gilbert	10	Tokyo, Japan	Hard	SF	6–3, 0–6, 6–4	25
111.	(Sweden) Stefan Edberg	3	Tokyo, Japan	Hard	F	6–2, 6–2	25
112.	(France) Henri Leconte	9	Paris, France	Carpet (i)	1R	7–5, 6–1	18
1989
113.	(Switzerland) Jakob Hlasek	9	Lyon, France	Carpet (i)	F	6–3, 7–6^{(7–3)}	8
114.	(United States) Andre Agassi	4	WCT Finals, Dallas, United States	Carpet (i)	QF	4–6, 3–0, ret.	6
115.	(Czechoslovakia) Ivan Lendl	1	WCT Finals, Dallas, United States	Carpet (i)	SF	6–7, 7–6, 6–2, 7–5	6
116.	(Sweden) Mats Wilander	5	Wimbledon, London, United Kingdom	Grass	QF	7–6^{(8–6)}, 3–6, 6–3, 6–4	8
117.	(United States) Michael Chang	5	Paris, France	Carpet (i)	QF	6–4, 6–3	4
118.	(United States) Aaron Krickstein	8	Masters, New York, United States	Carpet (i)	RR	5–7, 6–3, 6–2	4
119.	(United States) Michael Chang	5	Masters, New York, United States	Carpet (i)	RR	6–2, 5–7, 6–4	4
1990
120.	(United States) Jay Berger	10	Toronto, Canada	Carpet (i)	QF	6–4, 6–0	4
121.	(United States) Brad Gilbert	8	Long Island, United States	Hard	QF	6–3, 6–2	21
122.	(Soviet Union) Andrei Chesnokov	10	US Open, New York, United States	Hard	3R	6–3, 7–5, 6–4	20
123.	(Spain) Emilio Sánchez	7	US Open, New York, United States	Hard	4R	7–6^{(8–6)}, 3–6, 4–6, 6–4, 6–3	20
124.	(Socialist Federal Republic of Yugoslavia) Goran Ivanišević	10	Basel, Switzerland	Hard (i)	F	6–7^{(4–7)}, 4–6, 7–6^{(7–3)}, 6–3, 6–4	11
1992
125.	(Germany) Boris Becker	3	Australian Open, Melbourne, Australia	Hard	3R	6–4, 6–3, 7–5	28
126.	(Spain) Emilio Sánchez	9	Australian Open, Melbourne, Australia	Hard	4R	7–5, 7–6^{(7–4)}, 4–6, 2–6, 8–6	28
127.	(Croatia) Goran Ivanišević	7	Miami, United States	Hard	3R	5–7, 7–5, 7–5	34
128.	(France) Guy Forget	9	Wimbledon, London, United Kingdom	Grass	QF	6–2, 7–6^{(11–9)}, 6–3	30

== See also ==
- Borg-McEnroe rivalry
- Lendl–McEnroe rivalry
- Connors-McEnroe rivalry
