= Lendl–McEnroe rivalry =

Tennis rivalry

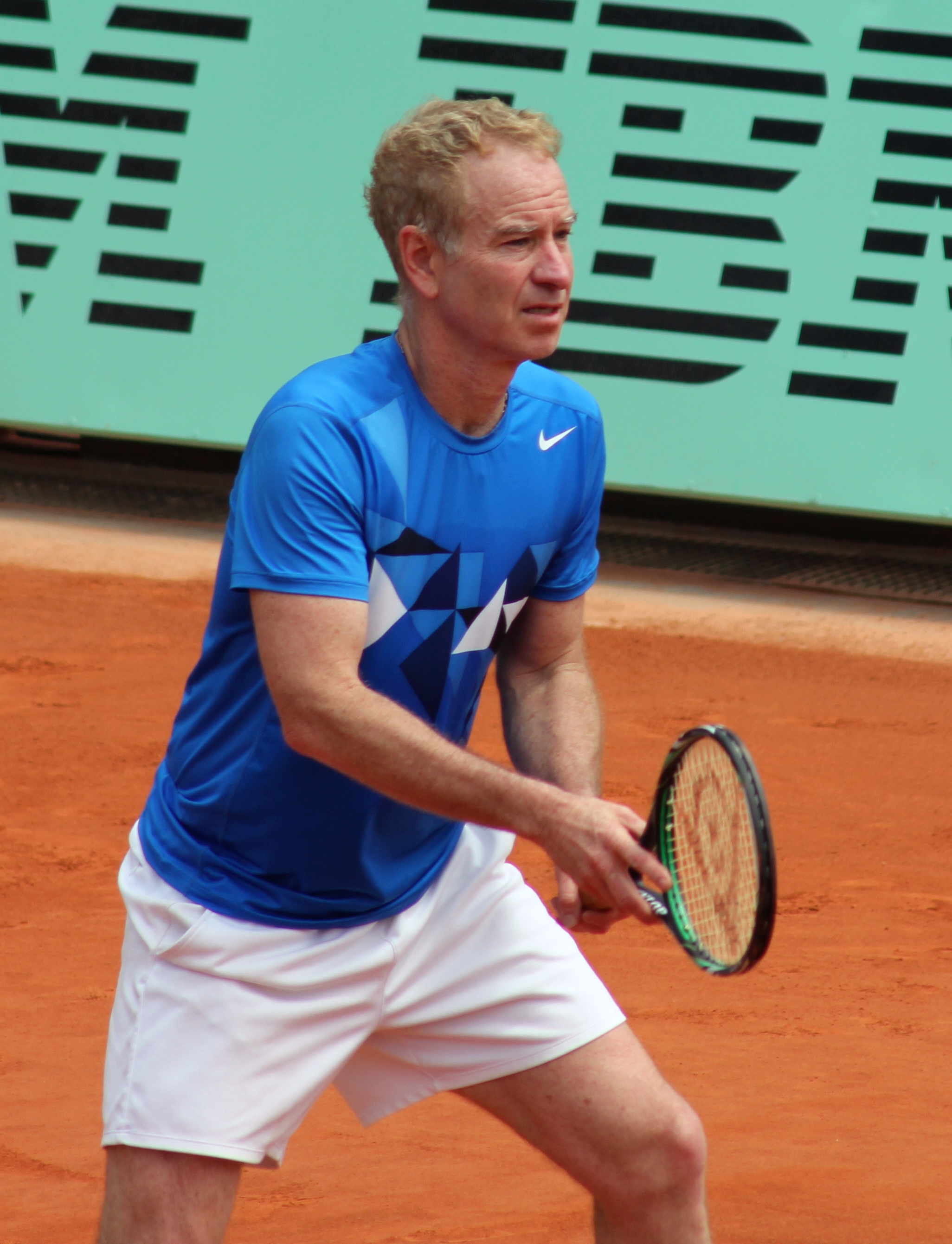
John McEnroe (seven singles majors) dominated the ATP Tour in the first half of the 1980s.

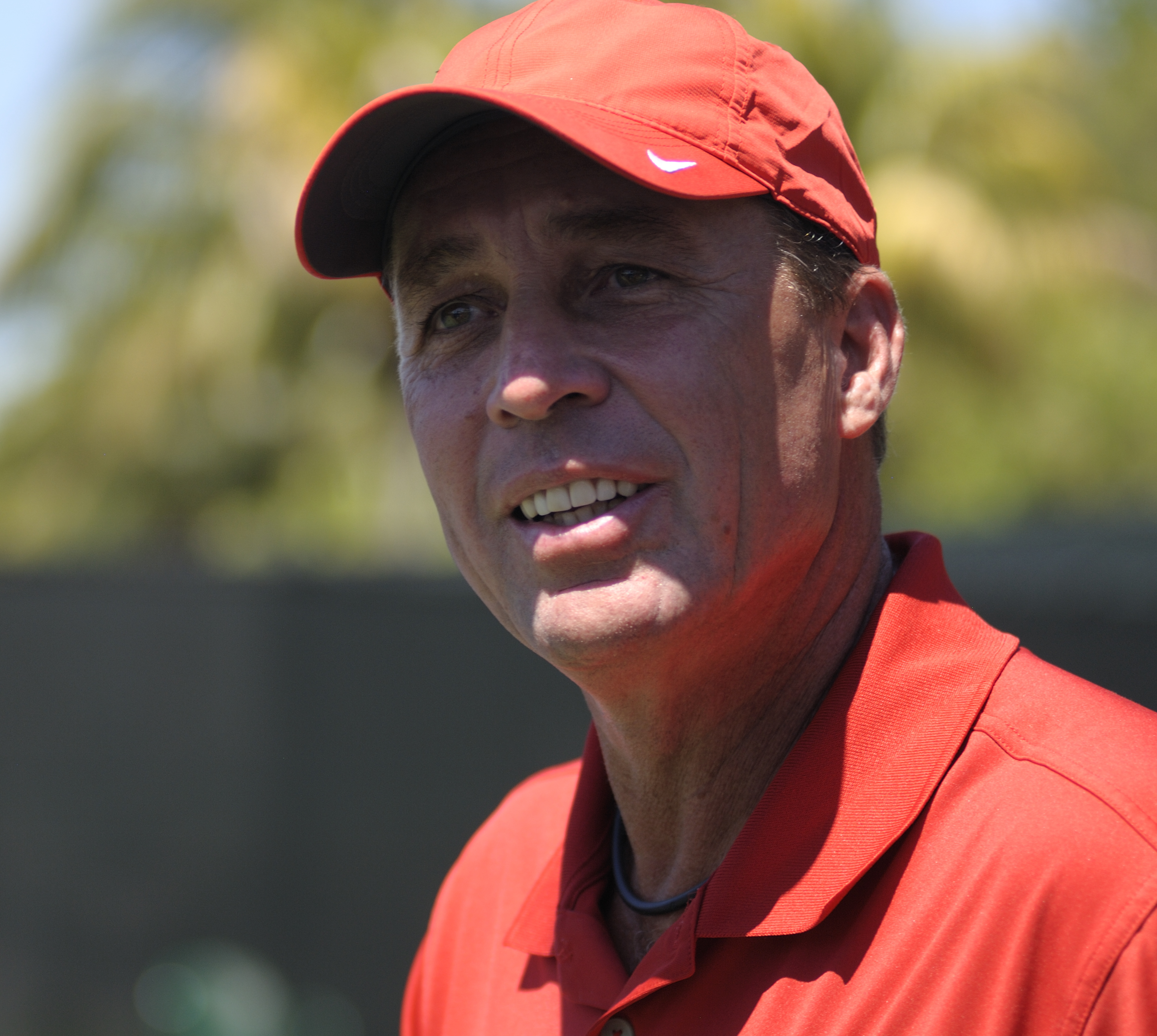
Ivan Lendl (eight singles majors) dominated the ATP Tour in the second half of the 1980s.

The Lendl–McEnroe rivalry was a tennis rivalry between Ivan Lendl and John McEnroe, who met in 36 matches between 1980 and 1992. Their head-to-head is 21–15, favoring Lendl. It is one of the most notable tennis rivalries of the Open Era. Their most memorable match was the 1984 French Open final, when Lendl came from two sets down to win the championship, which McEnroe considered his worst loss.

McEnroe, although capable of holding his own from the back court against most players, struggled against Lendl. Thus he would use every opportunity to get to the net and take time away from Lendl, who was not the fastest mover and had loopier racket swings—which on faster surfaces did not serve him as well as on a clay court.

McEnroe served a variety of spins, speed and placements to keep Lendl guessing and adjusting. Lendl, on the other hand, had a simpler game plan: serve hard enough to keep McEnroe back from the net, and then pound away with his powerful topspin groundstrokes.

Both pushed each other to evolve—McEnroe adopted the Max200G racket to improve on his power, whereas Lendl hired a nutritionist, fitness advisor and Tony Roche as his coach to improve his known weaknesses: second serve, backhand and volleys.

== Head-to-head ==
Legend	Lendl	McEnroe
Grand Slam	7	3
Masters Grand Prix	3	2
WCT Finals	1	2
ATP Masters Series	1	0
ATP International Series	8	8
Davis Cup	1	0
Total	21	15

=== Official matches (36) ===
Lendl 21 – McEnroe 15

No.	Year	Tournament	Surface	Round	Winner	Score	Lendl	McEnroe
1.	1980	Milan Indoor	Carpet	Semifinals	McEnroe	6–3, 1–6, 6–2	0	1
2.	1980	US Open	Hard	Quarterfinals	McEnroe	4–6, 6–3, 6–2, 7–5	0	2
3.	1981	French Open	Clay	Quarterfinals	Lendl	6–4, 6–4, 7–5	1	2
4.	1981	Davis Cup	Hard	Quarterfinals	Lendl	6–4, 14–12, 7–5	2	2
5.	1981	Masters Grand Prix	Carpet	Semifinals	Lendl	6–4, 6–2	3	2
6.	1982	WCT Finals	Carpet	Final	Lendl	6–2, 3–6, 6–3, 6–3	4	2
7.	1982	Canadian Open	Hard	Semifinals	Lendl	6–4, 6–4	5	2
8.	1982	US Open	Hard	Semifinals	Lendl	6–4, 6–4, 7–6^{(8–6)}	6	2
9.	1982	Masters Grand Prix	Carpet	Final	Lendl	6–4, 6–4, 6–2	7	2
10.	1983	US Pro Indoor	Carpet	Final	McEnroe	4–6, 7–6^{(9–7)}, 6–4, 6–3	7	3
11.	1983	WCT Finals	Carpet	Final	McEnroe	6–2, 4–6, 6–3, 6–7^{(5–7)}, 7–6^{(7–0)}	7	4
12.	1983	Wimbledon	Grass	Semifinals	McEnroe	7–6^{(7–5)}, 6–4, 6–4	7	5
13.	1983	Pacific Coast Championships	Carpet	Final	Lendl	3–6, 7–6^{(7–4)}, 6–4	8	5
14.	1983	Masters Grand Prix	Carpet	Final	McEnroe	6–3, 6–4, 6–4	8	6
15.	1984	US Pro Indoor	Carpet	Final	McEnroe	6–3, 3–6, 6–3, 7–6^{(7–3)}	8	7
16.	1984	Brussels Indoor	Carpet	Final	McEnroe	6–1, 6–3	8	8
17.	1984	WCT Tournament of Champions	Clay	Final	McEnroe	6–4, 6–2	8	9
18.	1984	World Team Cup	Clay	Team Final	McEnroe	6–3, 6–2	8	10
19.	1984	French Open	Clay	Final	Lendl	3–6, 2–6, 6–4, 7–5, 7–5	9	10
20.	1984	US Open	Hard	Final	McEnroe	6–3, 6–4, 6–1	9	11
21.	1984	Masters Grand Prix	Carpet	Final	McEnroe	7–5, 6–0, 6–4	9	12
22.	1985	WCT Tournament of Champions	Clay	Final	Lendl	6–3, 6–3	10	12
23.	1985	World Team Cup	Clay	Team Final	Lendl	6–7^{(4–7)}, 7–6^{(8–6)}, 6–3	11	12
24.	1985	Volvo International	Hard	Final	McEnroe	7–6^{(7–4)}, 6–2	11	13
25.	1985	Canadian Open	Hard	Final	McEnroe	7–5, 6–3	11	14
26.	1985	US Open	Hard	Final	Lendl	7–6^{(7–1)}, 6–3, 6–4	12	14
—	1987	Volvo International	Hard	Final	(No Result)	6–7^{(3–7)}, 4–1 Abandoned due to weather	12	14
27.	1987	US Open	Hard	Quarterfinals	Lendl	6–3, 6–3, 6–4	13	14
28.	1988	French Open	Clay	Last 16	Lendl	6–7^{(3–7)}, 7–6^{(7–3)}, 6–4, 6–4	14	14
29.	1989	Australian Open	Hard	Quarterfinals	Lendl	7–6^{(7–0)}, 6–2, 7–6^{(7–2)}	15	14
30.	1989	WCT Finals	Carpet	Semifinals	McEnroe	6–7^{(4–7)}, 7–6^{(7–5)}, 6–2, 7–5	15	15
31.	1989	Canadian Open	Hard	Final	Lendl	6–1, 6–3	16	15
32.	1989	Masters Grand Prix	Carpet	Round Robin	Lendl	6–3, 6–3	17	15
33.	1990	Toronto Indoor	Carpet	Semifinals	Lendl	6–3, 6–2	18	15
34.	1990	Queen's Club Championships	Grass	Semifinals	Lendl	6–2, 6–4	19	15
35.	1991	ATP Long Island	Hard	Semifinals	Lendl	6–3, 7–5	20	15
36.	1992	Canadian Open	Hard	Quarterfinals	Lendl	6–2, 6–4	21	15

- Note: WEA indicates a match canceled due to weather. There was no result in this final.

== Breakdown of their rivalry ==
- All matches: (36) Lendl 21–15
- All finals: (18)* McEnroe 10–7, *(1 No Result)
  - Grand Slam finals: Lendl 2–1
  - Grand Slam matches: Lendl 7–3
  - Masters matches: Lendl 3–2
  - WCT Finals matches: McEnroe 2–1
  - Davis Cup matches: Lendl 1–0
  - Other tournament matches: Tied 8–8

== Other matches ==
=== Invitational matches ===
Lendl–McEnroe (16–11)

No.	Year	Tournament	Surface	Round	Winner	Score
1.	1981	Rome	Carpet	Final	McEnroe	7–6, 6–4
2.	1981	Suntory Cup	Carpet	Semifinals	McEnroe	7–6, 6–4
3.	1981	Brooklyn Masters	Carpet	Final	Lendl	6–4, 2–6, 6–4
4.	1981	Europe vs. Americas	Carpet	Round Robin	McEnroe	4–6, 7–6, 6–1
5.	1981	Challenge of Champions	Carpet	Semifinals	McEnroe	6–1, 7–6
6.	1982	Molson Light Challenge	Carpet	Final	Lendl	7–5, 3–6, 7–6, 7–5
7.	1982	AKAI Gold Challenge	Carpet	Round Robin	Lendl	7–5, 6–2, 1–6, 4–6, 6–1
8.	1982	Europe vs. Americas	Carpet	Round Robin	Lendl	2–6, 7–5, 6–2
9.	1982	European Community Championship	Carpet	Final	Lendl	3–6, 7–6, 6–3, 6–3
10.	1982	Challenge of Champions	Carpet	Round Robin	McEnroe	6–3, 6–2
11.	1983	Luxembourg	Carpet	Final	Lendl	6–4, 6–2
12.	1983	Rio Tennis Challenge	Carpet	Final	McEnroe	6–3, 6–1
13.	1984	AKAI Gold Challenge	Carpet	Round Robin	McEnroe	7–5, 6–2, 6–1
14.	1984	Suntory Cup	Carpet	Final	Lendl	6–4, 3–6, 6–2
15.	1985	Forum Tennis Challenge	Carpet	Final	McEnroe	6–4, 7–6
16.	1985	Suntory Cup	Carpet	Final	Lendl	6–4, 6–2
17.	1985	Meadowlands Tennis Challenge	Carpet	Final	Lendl	7–5, 6–4
18.	1985	European Community Championship	Carpet	Final	Lendl	1–6, 7–6, 6–2, 6–2
19.	1985	Challenge of Champions	Carpet	Semifinals	Lendl	7–6, 6–3
20.	1986	Forum Tennis Challenge	Carpet	Final	Lendl	6–4, 3–6, 7–6
21.	1986	Norstar Bank Hamlet Challenge Cup	Hard	Final	Lendl	6–2, 6–4
22.	1986	Challenge of Champions	Carpet	Semifinals	McEnroe	6–4, 7–5
23.	1987	Barcelona	Clay	Final	Lendl	6–3, 3–6, 6–2
24.	1987	Challenge of Champions	Carpet	Round Robin	Lendl	5–7, 6–4, 7–6
25.	1988	Eurocard Classic	Carpet	Round Robin	McEnroe	7–6, 7–6
26.	1988	Michelin Challenge	Carpet	Final	McEnroe	7–5, 6–2
27.	1989	All Stars Tennis Classic	Carpet	Final	Lendl	6–4, 7–5

== ATP rankings ==
=== Year-end ranking timeline ===
Player	1977	1978	1979	1980	1981	1982	1983	1984	1985	1986	1987	1988	1989	1990	1991	1992	1993	1994
(Czechoslovakia) / (United States) Ivan Lendl		74	20	6	2	3	2	3	1	1	1	2	1	3	5	8	19	54
(United States) John McEnroe	21	4	3	2	1	1	1	1	2	14	10	11	4	13	28	20		

== See also ==
- Borg–McEnroe rivalry
- Connors–McEnroe rivalry
- Connors–Lendl rivalry
- List of tennis rivalries
