= 1980 Ramazzotti Cup =

- Date: 24–30 March
- Edition: 3rd
- Category: Grand Prix (WCT)
- Draw: 32S / 16D
- Prize money: $200,000
- Surface: Carpet / indoor
- Location: Milan, Italy
- Venue: Palazzo dello Sport

Champions

Singles
- (United States) John McEnroe

Doubles
- (United States) Peter Fleming / (United States) John McEnroe
- Milan Indoor

The 1980 Ramazzotti Cup, also known as the Milan Indoor or Milan WCT, was a men's tennis tournament played on indoor carpet courts at the Palazzo dello Sport in Milan, Italy. The event was part WCT Tour which was incorporated into the 1980 Volvo Grand Prix circuit. It was the third edition of the tournament and was held from 24 March through 30 March 1980. First-seeded John McEnroe won the singles title.

== Finals ==
=== Singles ===
(United States) John McEnroe defeated (India) Vijay Amitraj 6–1, 6–4

- It was McEnroe's 3rd singles title of the year and the 18th of his career.

=== Doubles ===
(United States) Peter Fleming / (United States) John McEnroe defeated (Rhodesia) Andrew Pattison / (United States) Butch Walts 6–4, 6–3
