= Rio Champions Cup =

Tennis tournament in Brazil

The Rio Champions Cup is an event in the Outback Champions Series for senior tennis players. It was founded in 2009 and is held each year in Rio de Janeiro, Brazil.

== Finals results ==
Year	Champion	Runner-up	Score	Ref
2009	John McEnroe	Jim Courier	6-2, 6-3	
2010	Fernando Meligeni	Mark Philippoussis	6-2, 4-6, 10-8	
