= 1984 World Championship Tennis Finals – Singles =

Singles
- 1984 World Championship Tennis Finals

Final
- Champion: (United States) John McEnroe
- Runner-up: (United States) Jimmy Connors
- Score: 6–1, 6–2, 6–3

Events
Singles
← 1983 ·	World Championship Tennis Finals	· 1985 →

First-seeded John McEnroe was the defending champion and won in the final, which lasted 1h39, against Jimmy Connors in straight sets 6–1, 6–2, 6–3 .

== Seeds ==
A champion seed is indicated in bold text while text in italics indicates the round in which that seed was eliminated.

1. (United States) **John McEnroe (champion)**
2. (United States) Jimmy Connors (final)
3. (United States) Jimmy Arias (semifinals)
4. (United States) Johan Kriek (quarterfinals)

== Draw ==
=== Key ===
- Q = Qualifier
- WC = Wild card
- LL = Lucky loser
- Alt = Alternate
- SE = Special exempt
- PR = Protected ranking
- ITF = ITF entry
- JE = Junior exempt
- w/o = Walkover
- r = Retired
- d = Defaulted
- SR = Special ranking

First round
(United States) **Vitas Gerulaitis**	2	5	**7**	**6**	**6**
(United States) Bill Scanlon	**6**	**7**	6	3	2
(South Africa) **Kevin Curren**	3	4	**6**	**6**	**6**
(United States) Mark Dickson	**6**	**6**	3	4	3
(United States) **Eliot Teltscher**	**6**	**6**	4	**6**
(Sweden) Henrik Sundström	2	1	**6**	2
(Czechoslovakia) Tomáš Šmíd	2	**6**	6	3
(United States) **Tim Mayotte**	**6**	4	**7**	**6**

Quarterfinals
1	(United States) **John McEnroe**	**6**	**6**	**6**
(United States) Vitas Gerulaitis	3	1	3
4	(United States) Johan Kriek	**6**	**6**	1	4	1
(South Africa) **Kevin Curren**	4	3	**6**	**6**	**6**
(United States) Eliot Teltscher	4	4	5
3	(United States) **Jimmy Arias**	**6**	**6**	**7**
(United States) Tim Mayotte	**6**	5	3	3
2	(United States) **Jimmy Connors**	4	**7**	**6**	**6**

Semifinals
1	(United States) **John McEnroe**	**6**	**6**	**6**
(South Africa) Kevin Curren	3	3	4
3	(United States) Jimmy Arias	0	6	2
2	(United States) **Jimmy Connors**	**6**	**7**	**6**

Final
1	(United States) **John McEnroe**	**6**	**6**	**6**
2	(United States) Jimmy Connors	1	2	3
