= 1983 World Championship Tennis Finals – Singles =

Singles
- 1983 World Championship Tennis Finals

Final
- Champion: (United States) John McEnroe
- Runner-up: (Czechoslovakia) Ivan Lendl
- Score: 6–2, 4–6, 6–3, 6–7, 7–6

Details
- Draw: 12S

Events
Singles
← 1982 ·	World Championship Tennis Finals	· 1984 →

Ivan Lendl was the defending champion but lost in the final 6–2, 4–6, 6–3, 6–7, 7–6 to John McEnroe.

== Seeds ==
A champion seed is indicated in bold text while text in italics indicates the round in which that seed was eliminated.

1. (Czechoslovakia) Ivan Lendl (final)
2. (United States) **John McEnroe (champion)**
3. (Argentina) Guillermo Vilas (quarterfinals)
4. (South Africa) Kevin Curren (quarterfinals)

== Draw ==
=== Key ===
- Q = Qualifier
- WC = Wild card
- LL = Lucky loser
- Alt = Alternate
- SE = Special exempt
- PR = Protected ranking
- ITF = ITF entry
- JE = Junior exempt
- w/o = Walkover
- r = Retired
- d = Defaulted
- SR = Special ranking

First round
(Australia) Paul McNamee	4	**7**	6	6
(United States) **Steve Denton**	**6**	5	**7**	**7**
(Hungary) Balázs Taróczy	2	4	3
(United States) **Bill Scanlon**	**6**	**6**	**6**
(United States) **Vitas Gerulaitis**	**7**	3	**6**	**6**
(Argentina) José Luis Clerc	6	**6**	1	3
(Poland) Wojciech Fibak	**6**	3	6	2
(Czechoslovakia) **Tomáš Šmíd**	3	**6**	**7**	**6**

Quarterfinals
1	(Czechoslovakia) **Ivan Lendl**	**6**	**7**	**6**
(United States) Steve Denton	4	5	4
4	(South Africa) Kevin Curren	**6**	3	2	3
(United States) **Bill Scanlon**	2	**6**	**6**	**6**
(United States) **Vitas Gerulaitis**	**7**	**6**	**6**
3	(Argentina) Guillermo Vilas	6	4	2
(Czechoslovakia) Tomáš Šmíd	1	4	3
2	(United States) **John McEnroe**	**6**	**6**	**6**

Semifinals
1	(Czechoslovakia) **Ivan Lendl**	**6**	6	**6**	**6**
(United States) Bill Scanlon	1	**7**	3	3
(United States) Vitas Gerulaitis	3	2	2
2	(United States) **John McEnroe**	**6**	**6**	**6**

Final
1	(Czechoslovakia) Ivan Lendl	2	**6**	3	**7**	6
2	(United States) **John McEnroe**	**6**	4	**6**	6	**7**
