= 1981 Volvo Masters – Singles =

Singles
- 1981 Volvo Masters

Final
- Champion: (Czechoslovakia) Ivan Lendl
- Runner-up: (United States) Vitas Gerulaitis
- Score: 6–7^{(5–7)}, 2–6, 7–6^{(8–6)}, 6–2, 6–4

Details
- Draw: 8

Events
Singles	Doubles
← 1980 ·	ATP Finals	· 1982 →

Ivan Lendl defeated Vitas Gerulaitis in the final, 6–7^{(5–7)}, 2–6, 7–6^{(8–6)}, 6–2, 6–4 to win the singles title at the 1981 Volvo Masters. Lendl saved a match point at 5-6 in the third set tiebreak.

Björn Borg was the defending champion, but did not participate.

== Draw ==
=== Key ===
- Q = Qualifier
- WC = Wild card
- LL = Lucky loser
- Alt = Alternate
- ITF = ITF entry
- PR = Protected ranking
- SR = Special ranking
- SE = Special exempt
- JE = Junior exempt
- JR = Junior Accelerator Programme entrant
- CO = College Accelerator Programme entrant
- NG = Next Gen Accelerator Program entrant
- w/o = Walkover
- r = Retired
- d = Defaulted

=== Finals ===
Semifinals
(United States) Vitas Gerulaitis	7	4	6
(United States) Eliot Teltscher	5	6	2
(Czechoslovakia) Ivan Lendl	6	6
(United States) John McEnroe	4	2

Final
(United States) Vitas Gerulaitis	7^{7}	6	6^{6}	2	4
(Czechoslovakia) Ivan Lendl	6^{5}	2	7^{8}	6	6

=== Group A ===
	(United States) Teltscher	(United States) Tanner	(United States) McEnroe	(United States) Connors	RR; W–L	Set; W–L	Game; W–L	Standings
(United States) Eliot Teltscher		4–6, 6–1, 6–4	6–4, 6–1	5–7, 1–6	2–1	4–3	34–29	1
(United States) Roscoe Tanner	6–4, 1–6, 4–6		3–6, 2–6	7–6, 6–7, 7–6	1–2	3–5	36–47	3
(United States) John McEnroe	4–6, 1–6	6–3, 6–2		6–2, 7–5	2–1	4–2	30–24	2
(United States) Jimmy Connors	7–5, 6–1	6–7, 7–6, 6–7	2–6, 5–7		1–2	3–4	34–36	4

Standings are determined by: 1. number of wins; 2. number of matches; 3. in two-players-ties, head-to-head records; 4. in three-players-ties, percentage of sets won, or of games won; 5. steering-committee decision.

=== Group B ===
	(Czechoslovakia) Lendl	(United States) Gerulaitis	(Argentina) Vilas	(Argentina) Clerc	RR; W–L	Set; W–L	Game; W–L	Standings
(Czechoslovakia) Ivan Lendl		4–6, 7–5, 6–2	6–4, 6–1	–	2–0	4–1	29–18	1
(United States) Vitas Gerulaitis	6–4, 5–7, 2–6		6–1, 6–4	7–6, 6–1	2–1	5–2	38–29	2
(Argentina) Guillermo Vilas	4–6, 1–6	1–6, 4–6		6–1, 7–5	1–2	2–4	23–30	3
(Argentina) José Luis Clerc	–	6–7, 1–6	1–6, 5–7		0–2	0–4	13–26	4

Standings are determined by: 1. number of wins; 2. number of matches; 3. in two-players-ties, head-to-head records; 4. in three-players-ties, percentage of sets won, or of games won; 5. steering-committee decision.

== See also ==
- ATP World Tour Finals appearances
