= Ivan Lendl =

Czech and American tennis player (born 1960)

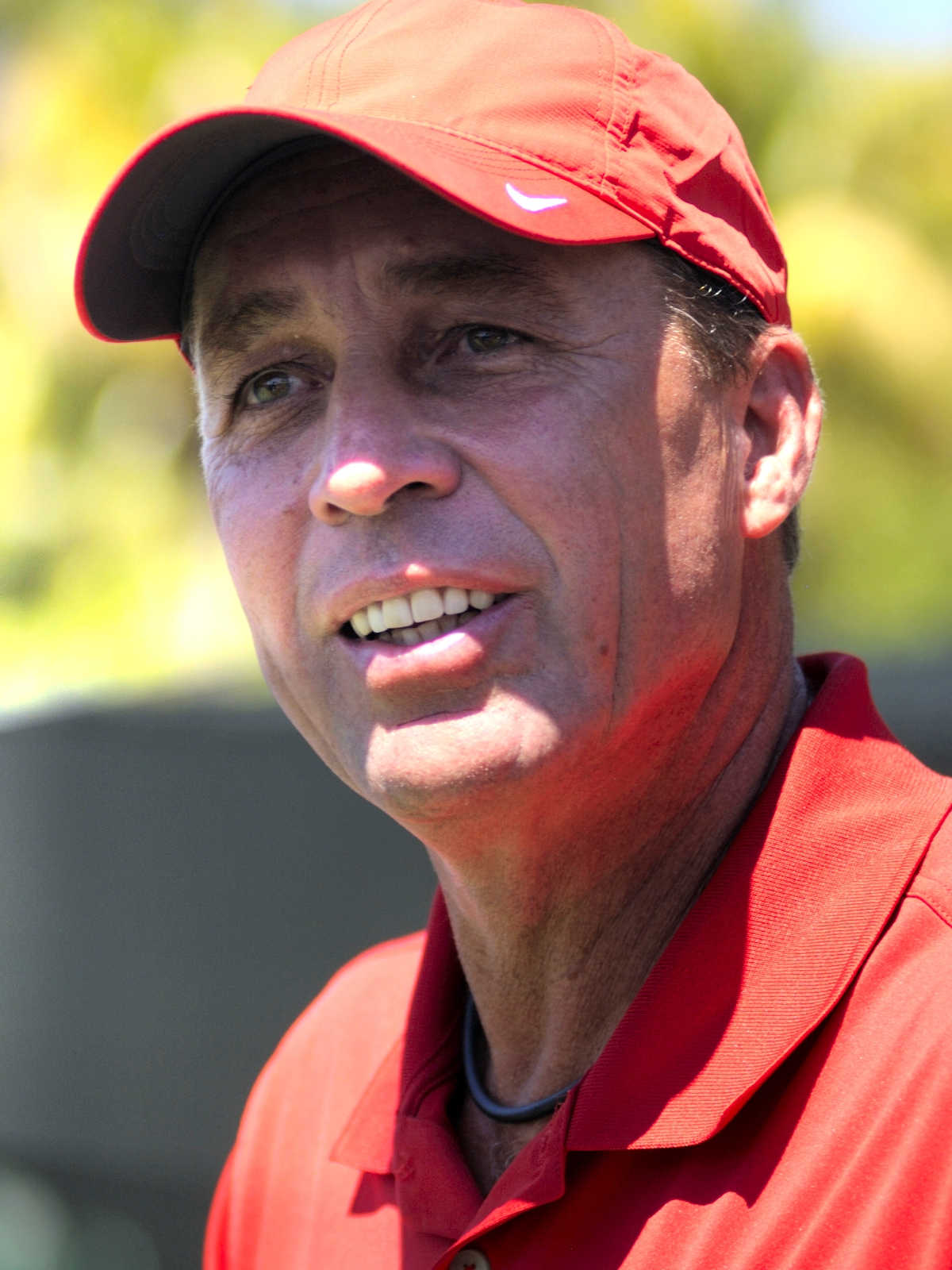
- Lendl in 2012
- Country (sports): Czechoslovakia (1978–92); United States (1992–94)
- Residence: Vero Beach, Florida, US
- Born: March 7, 1960 (age 66) Ostrava, Czechoslovakia
- Height: 6 ft 2 in (1.88 m)
- Turned pro: 1978
- Retired: 1994
- Plays: Right-handed (one-handed backhand)
- Coach: Wojtek Fibak (1979-1985); Tony Roche (1985-1994)
- Prize money: US$21,262,417: 32nd all-time leader in earnings
- Int. Tennis HoF: 2001 (member page)

Singles
- Career record: 1068–242 (81.5%)
- Career titles: 94 (4th in the Open Era)
- Highest ranking: No. 1 (February 28, 1983)

Grand Slam singles results
- Australian Open: W (1989, 1990)
- French Open: W (1984, 1986, 1987)
- Wimbledon: F (1986, 1987)
- US Open: W (1985, 1986, 1987)

Other tournaments
- Tour Finals: W (1981, 1982, 1985, 1986, 1987)
- Grand Slam Cup: SF (1991)
- WCT Finals: W (1982, 1985)

Doubles
- Career record: 187–140 (57.2%)
- Career titles: 6
- Highest ranking: No. 20 (May 12, 1986)

Grand Slam doubles results
- Australian Open: 3R (1984)
- French Open: SF (1980)
- Wimbledon: 2R (1985)
- US Open: 3R (1980)

Team competitions
- Davis Cup: W (1980)

Coaching career
- Andy Murray (2011–2014; 2016–2017; 2022–2023); Alexander Zverev (2018–2019); Hubert Hurkacz (2025–)

Coaching achievements
- List of notable tournaments (with champion) 2x Wimbledon (Murray); US Open (Murray); Olympic Gold Medal 2012, 2016 (Murray); ATP Finals (Murray, Zverev); World No. 1 ranking (Murray)

Ivan Lendl (Czech: [ˈɪvan ˈlɛndl̩]; born March 7, 1960) is a Czech–American former professional tennis player and coach. Widely regarded as one of the greatest tennis players of all time, he was ranked as the world No. 1 in men's singles by the Association of Tennis Professionals (ATP) for 270 weeks (fourth-most of all time), and finished as the year-end No. 1 four times. Lendl won 94 career singles titles, including eight majors (three each at the French Open and US Open, and two at the Australian Open) and seven year-end championships. He was runner-up at a further eleven majors, for a total of 19 major finals (among which a record eight consecutive US Open finals).

Lendl is the only man in professional tennis history to have a match winning percentage of over 90% in five different years (1982, 1985, 1986, 1987, and 1989). He leads the head-to-head against his two biggest rivals, with a 22–13 record against Jimmy Connors and a 21–15 record against John McEnroe. Lendl's dominance of his era was most evident at the year-end championships, where he holds a win–loss record of 39–10 and contested the final a record nine consecutive times.

Commonly referred to as the "Father Of Modern Tennis" and "The Father of the Inside-Out Forehand", Lendl pioneered a new style of tennis; his game was built around his forehand, hit hard and with a heavy topspin, and his success is cited as a primary influence in popularizing the now-common playing style of aggressive baseline power tennis. After retirement, he became a tennis coach for several players; in particular, he helped Andy Murray win three majors and reach the world No. 1 ranking.

== Early life ==
Lendl was born into a tennis family in Ostrava, Czechoslovakia (now the Czech Republic). He was the only child of Jiří, a lawyer and former tennis player who was ranked number 15 in Czechoslovakia, and Olga, born Jeništová, who was at one point ranked the number 2 female player in the country. He began playing at the age of three (initially using a paddle to hit a ball against a wall before progressing to play with his father). By the age of 14 he defeated his mother.

Lendl first came to the tennis world's attention as a junior player. In 1978, he won the boys' singles titles at the Italian Open, French Open, and Wimbledon and was the world No. 1-ranked junior player.

== Professional career ==
=== 1978–1980 ===
Lendl turned professional in 1978 and ended the year ranked 74. After reaching his first top-level singles final in 1979, he won seven singles titles in 1980, including three tournament wins in three consecutive weeks. At the 1980 US Open, Lendl, seeded 10, allowed seventh seed Harold Solomon just one game in their fourth round match. In the quarter finals, McEnroe's full repertoire of on-court "antics" was on display as he beat Lendl in four sets. This was the first Lendl–McEnroe Grand Slam meeting and Lendl's first Grand Slam quarter final. Lendl was part of Czechoslovakia's Davis Cup winning team in 1980 and was undefeated in singles that year. However, he stopped playing in the Davis Cup and World Team Cup after he moved to the United States in 1986 because the Czechoslovak Tennis Association viewed him as an "illegal defector" from their country.

=== 1981 ===
The success continued in 1981, as he won ten titles. He reached his first Grand Slam final at the French Open in 1981, where he lost in five sets to Björn Borg. At Wimbledon he was "outserved" by Charlie Fancutt in the first round in five sets. At the US Open, Lendl lost in the fourth round in five sets to Vitas Gerulaitis. Gerulaitis often rushed the net to win the first two sets, but reverted to a baseline game in losing the next two and resumed his net rushing tactics in the fifth. He won his first season-ending Masters Grand Prix tour title, coming from 2 sets to 0 and match point down to beat Gerulaitis in five sets in the final. Lendl was part of the Czechoslovak team that won the World Team Cup. He relocated to the United States in 1981, first living at the home of mentor and friend, Wojtek Fibak.

=== 1982 ===
In 1982, Lendl won 15 of the 23 singles tournaments he entered and had a 44-match winning streak. Lendl competed on the World Championship Tennis (WCT) tour, where he won all ten tournaments he entered, including his first WCT Finals, where he defeated John McEnroe in straight sets. Lendl faced McEnroe again in the Masters Grand Prix final and won in straight sets to claim his second season-ending championship. In an era when tournament prize money was rising sharply due to the competition between two circuits (Grand Prix and WCT), Lendl's title victories quickly made him the highest-earning tennis player of all time. At the French Open, Lendl lost to Mats Wilander in five sets in the fourth round. "I was missing a little the timing on my forehand and it was difficult for me to play without it. I did my best and I was trying hard but I was outplayed" said Lendl afterwards. Lendl reached his first US Open final in 1982, beating McEnroe in the semi finals in straight sets. Lendl was "in peak form, finding the corners and the lines with his ferocious forehand and making infrequent but successful forays to the net". He was defeated in four sets in the final by Jimmy Connors, not being able to cope "with Connors' penetrating, sharply-angled groundstrokes into the corners, or his net-charging attacks".

=== 1983 ===
Lendl won another seven tournaments in 1983; however, he had not won any Grand Slam titles in the early years of his career. He lost in the quarter finals of the French Open in four sets to eventual winner Yannick Noah, which "produced some of the best tennis of the tournament" to that point. He lost in the Wimbledon semi finals to John McEnroe in straight sets; "McEnroe's serve, depending more on placement and spin rather than brute strength, was more effective" than Lendl's. He was the runner-up at the US Open (losing in four sets to Connors). and Australian Open (losing in straight sets to Mats Wilander; the fourth time he had lost a Grand Slam singles final). In July 1983, Lendl played three exhibition matches (against Johan Kriek, Kevin Curren, and Jimmy Connors) in Sun City, South Africa, in the apartheid-era bantustan of Bophuthatswana. The Czechoslovak Sport Federation (ČSTV), controlled by the Communist Party, expelled him from the Czechoslovak Davis Cup team and fined him $150,000. Lendl disputed the punishment and the fine.

=== 1984 ===
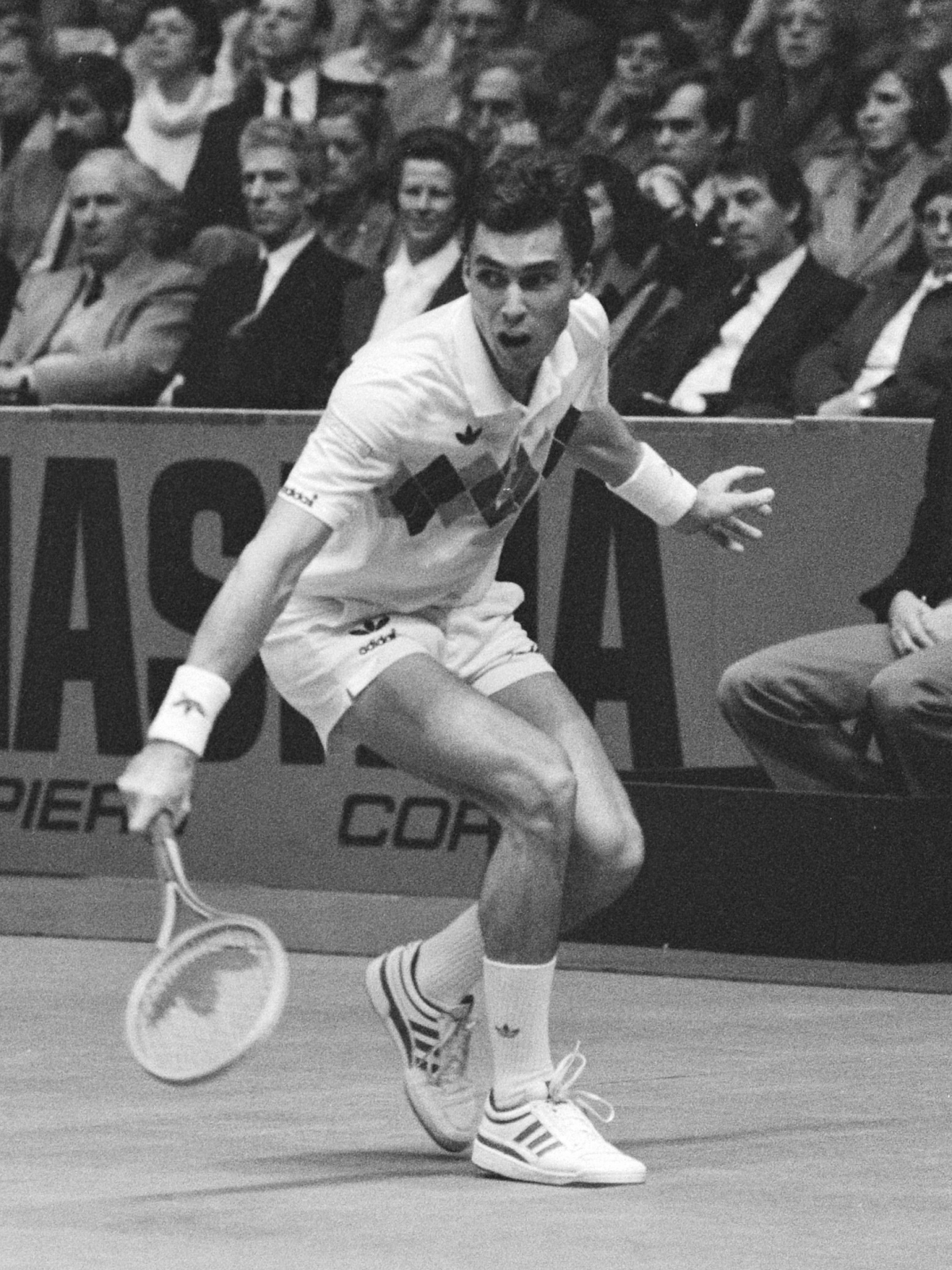
Ivan Lendl in the final of the 1984 ABN World Tennis tournament in Rotterdam

In 1984, Lendl bought his own house in Greenwich, Connecticut. Lendl's first Grand Slam title came at the 1984 French Open, where he defeated McEnroe in a long final. Down two sets to love, Lendl came back to claim the title in five sets. After the match Lendl said "John was playing great in the first two sets. He was hitting corners and lines all the time. Then I think he got a little tired. I was in better shape today and could run all day long". Lendl lost in four sets in the Wimbledon semi finals to Jimmy Connors. McEnroe defeated Lendl in straight sets in the final of the US Open. Playing with a heavily bandaged stomach due to a pulled stomach muscle, Lendl lost in straight sets in the fourth round of the Australian Open to Kevin Curren. He lost to McEnroe in Volvo Masters final.

=== 1985 ===
Lendl lost in the final of the 1985 French Open to Mats Wilander. At Wimbledon Lendl lost in the fourth round to Henri Leconte in an event when his serve was "out of sync". He then faced McEnroe again in the final of the US Open, winning in straight sets. He described the victory by saying, "Being that I beat John McEnroe, it's that much sweeter". He had trained and practiced vigorously with new coach Tony Roche since his defeat to McEnroe in the previous year's final. He reached the WCT Finals for the second and last time, defeating Tim Mayotte in three sets. He also won the Masters Grand Prix title for the third time, defeating Boris Becker in straight sets. He was upset by 19-year-old and No. 6 Stefan Edberg in the semifinals of the 1985 Australian Open in an epic match spread over two days.

=== 1986 ===
Lendl won the French Open title in 1986, defeating Mikael Pernfors in the final. He reached the Wimbledon final for the first time, winning long five set matches against Tim Mayotte in the quarters and Slobodan Živojinović in the semis, but lost to Boris Becker in straight sets. At the US Open, Lendl defeated Edberg in straight sets in the semi finals and overpowered Miloslav Mecir from the baseline and passed Mecir when he came to the net, winning the final in straight sets. Lendl defeated Becker in straight sets in the season-ending Masters final. "It was Lendl, the teacher, against Becker, the young pupil". Lendl lost only 12 points on his serve in 15 service games.

=== 1987 ===
Lendl lost in the 1987 Australian Open semi finals to Pat Cash. He won the French Open, beating Wilander in a four-set final that finished in semi-darkness and pouring rain. At Wimbledon he beat Edberg in the semi finals in four sets before losing in straight sets to Cash in the final. In round one of the US Open, Lendl achieved the first ever men's singles US Open triple bagel win in beating Barry Moir in 71 minutes. In the final, Lendl was suffering from influenza, but outlasted Wilander in a match lasting 4 hours and 47 minutes (the longest singles final in the tournaments history, surpassed the following year). Lendl won the Masters Grand Prix championship title in three sets over Wilander. This took him to his fifth and last Grand Prix year-end tour title.

In each year from 1985 to 1987, Lendl's match-winning percentage was over 90%. This record was equalled by Roger Federer in 2004–2006, but Lendl remains the only male tennis player with over 90% match wins in five different years (1982 was the first, 1989 the last). From the 1985 US Open to the 1988 Australian Open, Lendl reached ten consecutive Grand Slam singles semifinals – a record that was broken by Federer at the 2007 Australian Open.

=== 1988 ===
At the 1988 Australian Open, Lendl lost to Cash in the semi-finals in five sets and struggled with the heat in the later stages of the match. At the French Open, Lendl defeated John McEnroe before losing in straight sets to Jonas Svensson in the quarter finals. At Wimbledon, Lendl lost in the semi-finals to Becker in four sets. Lendl reached his only Grand Slam final of the year at the US Open, losing the final to Wilander in five sets in 4 hours 54 minutes (the longest US singles final to that point).

=== 1989 ===
Lendl began 1989 by winning his first Australian Open title with a straight-sets final victory where he "overpowered" Miloslav Mečíř in a match when the court surface temperature reached 135 degrees. He went on to win 10 titles out of 17 tournaments he entered. At the French Open, Lendl was upset in the fourth round by 17-year-old Michael Chang, a five-set match that took 4 hours and 37 minutes; Chang went on to win the tournament for what turned out to be his sole career Grand Slam title. At Wimbledon, Lendl reached the semi-finals and led Becker by 2 sets to 1 and a break before losing in five sets. "His volleying is much better; he's picking up a lot more balls. Today I had a very good backhand. Lendl should have mixed his serves more", said Becker after the match. Lendl lost the US Open final to Becker in four sets, which was the last of eight consecutive US Open finals that Lendl contested.

=== 1990 ===
Lendl successfully defended his Australian Open title in 1990 when Edberg retired in the final. That season, Lendl put in intensive efforts to train and improve his grass court game. He switched to a larger-headed racket and skipped the 1990 French Open to spend more time practising on grass. He won the Queen's Club Championships, with comfortable straight-set victories over McEnroe in the semi-final and Becker in the final, but was unable to reproduce this form at Wimbledon, and although he reached the semi-finals for the seventh time in eight years, he looked "tight and inhibited" in losing to eventual champion Stefan Edberg in straight sets. Wimbledon became the only Grand Slam singles title Lendl never managed to win. At the US Open, Lendl "was not at the top of his game" when losing to 19 year old Pete Sampras in the quarter finals in five sets.

=== 1991 ===
Lendl remained near the top of the rankings in 1991. In the semi finals of the Australian Open in January that year, Edberg served for the match against Lendl leading 5-4 in the fourth set and had two match points but went on to lose in five sets. Lendl lost the final in four sets to Becker, which was Lendl's last Grand Slam final. To date, only Djokovic, Federer, and Nadal have ever reached more Grand Slam men's singles finals than Lendl. Lendl served 23 aces in beating reigning US Open champion Sampras in five sets to win the US Pro indoors final in Philadelphia. Lendl skipped the French Open again to focus on Wimbledon, but lost in the third round against David Wheaton, and was never to win the Wimbledon title. At the US Open, he lost in straight sets in the semi-finals to Edberg.

=== 1992–1994 ===
In 1992, Lendl's best performances in Grand Slams were quarter finals at the Australian Open and US Open, where he lost to Edberg in five sets in both matches (at the US Open, Lendl led by a break in the fifth set before losing). Lendl announced his retirement from professional tennis on December 21, 1994, aged 34, due to chronic back pain. His last professional match prior to that had been his defeat in the second round of the US Open in 1994, three and a half months earlier.

Lendl won a career total of 94 ATP singles titles (plus 57 other non-ATP tournaments, a total of 151 singles titles) and 6 doubles titles, and his career total prize money of U.S. $21,262,417 was a record at the time. In 2001, he was inducted into the International Tennis Hall of Fame.

== Post-retirement activity ==
On April 10, 2010, Lendl returned to play in the Caesars Tennis Classic exhibition match in Atlantic City, New Jersey, against his rival from the late 1980s, Mats Wilander, his first tournament since his retirement in 1994. He lost the one-set match 3–6.

On February 28, 2011, Lendl returned to the court again in an exhibition match against McEnroe at Madison Square Garden in New York City. It was planned to be a one-set, first-to-eight event. However, McEnroe, leading 6–3, injured his ankle and had to retire from the match.

In May 2012, Lendl played an exhibition match in Prague during the 2012 Sparta Prague Open tournament. He defeated fellow Czech Jiří Novák.

== Coaching career ==
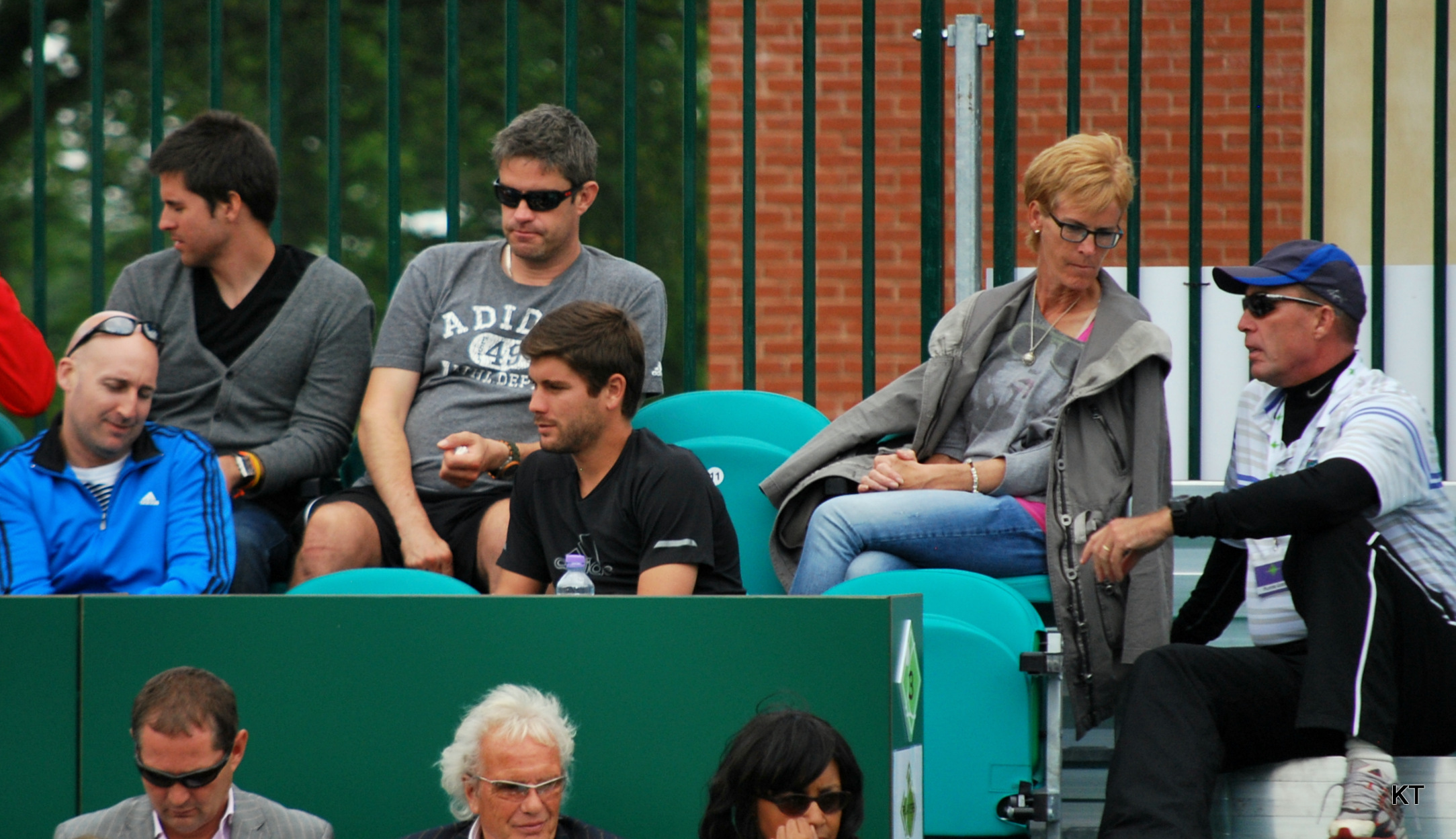
Lendl (far right) talking to Judy Murray.

On December 31, 2011, Lendl was appointed to coach Andy Murray. Lendl has been credited with improving Murray's maturity and consistency, guiding him to his first two Grand Slam victories in the 2012 US Open and 2013 Wimbledon Championships. On winning the US Open in 2012, Murray became the second player in the Open Era, after Lendl, to have lost their first four Grand Slam finals, and won the fifth. On March 19, 2014, it was announced that Lendl and Murray would be ending their two-year coaching partnership.

On June 12, 2016, Lendl rejoined Andy Murray's coaching team. By the end of 2016, Murray had become world No. 1, having won his second Wimbledon title, third major championship overall, second Olympic gold medal in singles, and his first ATP World Tour Finals title, defeating Novak Djokovic.

In August 2018, Lendl joined Alexander Zverev's team. They split up in July 2019 due to disappointing results in 2019 and personal differences. Zverev has stated that Lendl was more interested in his dog or his golf game than in professional coaching.

In March 2022, Lendl reunited with Murray for the third time. Murray managed to win three Challenger titles. In November 2023, Lendl split with his protege for the final time. Murray said he was "grateful" for the belief which Lendl continued to show in him.

He is currently coaching Hubert Hurkacz since November 2024.

== Playing style ==
Nicknamed "The Terminator" and "Ivan the Terrible", Lendl's Tennis Hall of Fame biography states: "As a professional Lendl's strength and power was the difference maker. It was earned by a fanatical work ethic, countless hours bashing balls on the tennis court, and even more hours pumping iron in the weight room. Despite his size, Lendl never fancied the serve-and-volley game, though he used it effectively when necessary. He was a punishing baseliner, hitting a heavy topspin forehand – though tight and flat compared to high and looping – and he had one of the most aggressive, relentless backcourt games that tennis has ever seen. His fitness was beyond reproach."

Lendl was well known for his meticulous and intensive training and physical conditioning regimen, and his scientific approach to preparation and playing. As part of his preparations for the US Open, he hired the same workers who laid the hardcourt surfaces at Flushing Meadows each year to install an exact copy in the grounds of his home in Greenwich, Connecticut.

=== Equipment ===
At the beginning of his professional career, Lendl used Adidas clothing and Kneissl rackets, subsequently changing to Adidas rackets. Toward the end of his days on the ATP tour, Lendl ended his long-term clothing, shoe, and racket deal with Adidas. He signed with Mizuno at the start of 1990, still playing with his old Adidas 80 sq. in. GTX Pro-T racquet. Finally, in the middle of the 1990 season, he switched to a mid-sized 90 sq. in. racket, Mizuno Ivan Lendl Type-R, designed especially for him for grass courts. After winning the Queens title and his semifinal defeat at Wimbledon against Stefan Edberg, Lendl returned to his old Adidas racquet and played with it until the end of the 1990 season.

== Career statistics ==
=== Grand Slam tournament performance timeline ===
Key
| **W** | F | SF | QF | #R | RR | Q# | DNQ | A | NH |

(W) winner; (F) finalist; (SF) semifinalist; (QF) quarterfinalist; (#R) rounds 4, 3, 2, 1; (RR) round-robin stage; (Q#) qualification round; (DNQ) did not qualify; (A) absent; (NH) not held; (SR) strike rate (events won / competed); (W–L) win–loss record.

| | Czechoslovakia | | | | | | | | | | | | | | United States | | | | | |
| Tournament | 1978 | 1979 | 1980 | 1981 | 1982 | 1983 | 1984 | 1985 | 1986 | 1987 | 1988 | 1989 | 1990 | 1991 | 1992 | 1993 | 1994 | SR | W–L | Win % |
| Australian Open | A | A | 2R | A | A | F | 4R | SF | NH | SF | SF | **W** | **W** | F | QF | 1R | 4R | 2 / 12 | 48–10 | 82.76% |
| French Open | 1R | 4R | 3R | F | 4R | QF | **W** | F | **W** | **W** | QF | 4R | A | A | 2R | 1R | 1R | 3 / 15 | 53–12 | 81.54% |
| Wimbledon | A | 1R | 3R | 1R | A | SF | SF | 4R | F | F | SF | SF | SF | 3R | 4R | 2R | A | 0 / 14 | 48–14 | 77.42% |
| US Open | A | 2R | QF | 4R | F | F | F | **W** | **W** | **W** | F | F | QF | SF | QF | 1R | 2R | 3 / 16 | 73–13 | 84.88% |
| **Win–loss** | **0–1** | **4–3** | **9–4** | **9–3** | **9–2** | **20–4** | **20–3** | **20–3** | **20–1** | **24–2** | **20–4** | **21–3** | **16–2** | **13–3** | **12–4** | **1–4** | **4–3** | **8 / 57** | **222–49** | **81.92%** |

=== Grand Slam tournament finals ===
Lendl reached 19 Grand Slam singles finals in his career. He won eight titles and was a runner-up in 11.

| Result | Year | Championship | Surface | Opponent | Score |
|---|---|---|---|---|---|
| Loss | 1981 | French Open | Clay | (Sweden) Björn Borg | 1–6, 6–4, 2–6, 6–3, 1–6 |
| Loss | 1982 | US Open | Hard | (United States) Jimmy Connors | 3–6, 2–6, 6–4, 4–6 |
| Loss | 1983 | US Open | Hard | (United States) Jimmy Connors | 3–6, 7–6^{(7–2)}, 5–7, 0–6 |
| Loss | 1983 | Australian Open | Grass | (Sweden) Mats Wilander | 1–6, 4–6, 4–6 |
| Win | 1984 | French Open | Clay | (United States) John McEnroe | 3–6, 2–6, 6–4, 7–5, 7–5 |
| Loss | 1984 | US Open | Hard | (United States) John McEnroe | 3–6, 4–6, 1–6 |
| Loss | 1985 | French Open | Clay | (Sweden) Mats Wilander | 6–3, 4–6, 2–6, 2–6 |
| Win | 1985 | US Open | Hard | (United States) John McEnroe | 7–6^{(7–1)}, 6–3, 6–4 |
| Win | 1986 | French Open (2) | Clay | (Sweden) Mikael Pernfors | 6–3, 6–2, 6–4 |
| Loss | 1986 | Wimbledon | Grass | (Germany) Boris Becker | 4–6, 3–6, 5–7 |
| Win | 1986 | US Open (2) | Hard | (Czechoslovakia) Miloslav Mečíř | 6–4, 6–2, 6–0 |
| Win | 1987 | French Open (3) | Clay | (Sweden) Mats Wilander | 7–5, 6–2, 3–6, 7–6^{(7–3)} |
| Loss | 1987 | Wimbledon | Grass | (Australia) Pat Cash | 6–7^{(5–7)}, 2–6, 5–7 |
| Win | 1987 | US Open (3) | Hard | (Sweden) Mats Wilander | 6–7^{(7–9)}, 6–0, 7–6^{(7–4)}, 6–4 |
| Loss | 1988 | US Open | Hard | (Sweden) Mats Wilander | 4–6, 6–4, 3–6, 7–5, 4–6 |
| Win | 1989 | Australian Open | Hard | (Czechoslovakia) Miloslav Mečíř | 6–2, 6–2, 6–2 |
| Loss | 1989 | US Open | Hard | (Germany) Boris Becker | 6–7^{(2–7)}, 6–1, 3–6, 6–7^{(4–7)} |
| Win | 1990 | Australian Open (2) | Hard | (Sweden) Stefan Edberg | 4–6, 7–6^{(7–3)}, 5–2 retired |
| Loss | 1991 | Australian Open | Hard | (Germany) Boris Becker | 6–1, 4–6, 4–6, 4–6 |

=== Records ===
==== All-time ====
- These records cover the entire period of tennis from 1877.

| Time span | Selected All-time tournament records | Players matched |
|---|---|---|
| 1981 Swiss Indoors— 1983 US Pro Indoor | 66 consecutive match wins indoor | **Stands alone** |
| 1983 Tokyo Indoor — 1986 Australian Indoor | 19 consecutive indoor finals | **Stands alone** |
| 1981 French Open– 1991 Australian Open | 11 consecutive years, at least 1 Grand Slam final | Pete Sampras |
| 1981 French Open– 1986 Wimbledon | Reached all 4 Grand Slam finals in career | 20 players tied |

==== Open Era ====
- These records were attained in the Open Era of tennis.
- Combined year end championships are: WCT Finals and Masters Grand Prix
- Records in **bold** indicate peer-less achievements.

| Time span | Selected Grand Slam tournament records | Players matched |
|---|---|---|
| 1982 US Open– 1989 US Open | 8 consecutive finals at a single Major | **Stands alone** |
| 1985 US Open — 1990 Australian Open | 2+ consecutive titles at 3 Majors | Roger Federer |
| 1981–1991 | 11 consecutive years reaching 1+ final | Pete Sampras |
| 1981 French Open — 1983 US Open | First 4 finals lost | Andy Murray |
| 1984 French Open | Won a Grand Slam final from two sets down. | Björn Borg; Andre Agassi; Gastón Gaudio; Dominic Thiem; Novak Djokovic; Rafael Nadal; Jannik Sinner; Carlos Alcaraz |

| Grand Slam tournaments | Time span | Records at each Grand Slam tournament | Players matched | Refs |
|---|---|---|---|---|
| Australian Open | 1989–1991 | 3 consecutive finals | Mats Wilander; Novak Djokovic | |
| US Open | 1982–1989 | 8 consecutive finals | **Stands alone** | |
| US Open | 1985–1986 | 26 consecutive sets won | **Stands alone** | |

| Time span | Other selected records | Players matched |
Year-End Championship (Note: Known as "Masters Grand Prix" (1970–1989) and "ATP Tour World Championships" (1990–1999).) records
| 1980–1988 | 12 combined WCT and GP finals overall | John McEnroe |
| 1980–1988 | 17 combined WCT and GP semifinals overall | **Stands alone** |
| 1980–1989 | 50 combined WCT and GP match wins overall | **Stands alone** |
| 1980–1989 | 18 combined WCT and GP appearances overall | John McEnroe |
| 1982, 1985–1986 | 3 GP titles won without losing a set | **Stands alone** |
| 1980–1988 | 9 consecutive finals | **Stands alone** |
| 1980–1991 | 12 consecutive semifinals | **Stands alone** |
Other records
| 1981–1982 | 18 consecutive finals | **Stands alone** |
| 1985–1986 | 9 consecutive hard/carpet court titles | John McEnroe |
| 1981–1983 | 20 consecutive hard court finals | **Stands alone** |
| 1983–1986 | 19 consecutive indoor finals | **Stands alone** |
| 1981–1983 | 66 consecutive indoor court match victories | **Stands alone** |
| 1982–1989 | 5 years with match winning percentage of 90%+ (417–36) | **Stands alone** |
| 1981–1989 | 4 years winning 10+ titles | Jimmy Connors |
| 1982 | 9 carpet court titles in 1 season | **Stands alone** |
| 1982 | 9 indoor titles in 1 season | **Stands alone** |
| 1980–1989 | 11 different Grand Prix Series tournaments won (Note: Philadelphia, Miami, Las Vegas, Forest Hills, Monte Carlo, Hamburg, Rome, Canada, Cincinnati, Stockholm, Tokyo.) | **Stands alone** |
| 1988–1989 | 7 consecutive Grand Prix Series titles won | **Stands alone** |
| 1980–1989 | 6 Canadian Open titles | **Stands alone** |
| 1987–1989 | 3 consecutive Canadian Open titles | **Stands alone** |
| 1980–1992 | 9 finals at Canadian Open | **Stands alone** |
| 1979–1994 | 57 match wins at Canadian Open | **Stands alone** |
| 1987–1991 | 18 consecutive match wins at Canadian Open | **Stands alone** |
| 1983–1993 | 5 Tokyo Indoor titles | **Stands alone** |
| 1982–1990 | 4 Forest Hills titles | **Stands alone** |
| 1982–1990 | 3 Toronto Indoor titles | **Stands alone** |
| 1981–1983 | 7 consecutive match wins against World No 1 | **Stands alone** |

== Awards and recognition ==
Lendl was the International Tennis Federation's World Champion on four occasions (1985, 1986, 1987, 1990) and the Association of Tennis Professionals (ATP) Player of The Year three times (1985, 1986, 1987). Earlier in his career, he was also named ATP Most Improved Player in 1981.

Due to his achievements, Lendl is often considered among the greatest tennis players in the sport's history. In his book Modern Encyclopedia of Tennis, Bud Collins included Lendl in his list of the greatest men's tennis players of the period 1946–1992. Tennis magazine described Lendl as "the game's greatest overachiever" in its 40th anniversary series. In 1986, North Korea issued a postage stamp featuring Lendl.

== Personal life ==
=== US citizenship ===
Lendl successfully applied for a U.S. Permanent Resident Card in 1987, hoping to obtain U.S. citizenship in time to represent the US in the 1988 Olympic Games and in the Davis Cup. A bill in Congress to bypass the traditional five-year waiting procedure was rejected in 1988 because Czechoslovak authorities refused to provide the necessary waivers. He became a U.S. citizen on July 7, 1992.

=== Family ===
On September 16, 1989, six days after competing in the final of the US Open versus Boris Becker, Lendl married Samantha Frankel. They have five daughters: Marika, twins Isabelle and Caroline, Daniela, and Nikola. Two of his daughters (Marika and Isabelle) were members of the University of Florida Women's Golf Team. Daniela was a member of the University of Alabama Women's Golf Team. His daughter Caroline was a part of the University of Alabama Women's Rowing Team for the 2011–2012 academic year, and his daughter Nikola was an instructor at SoulCycle.

=== Other activities ===
After finishing his tennis career in 1994, Lendl took up golf, reaching a handicap of 0 and achieving a win on the Celebrity Tour. Lendl has played in the Gary Player Invitational charity Pro-Am several times, and organized a charity competition in 2004 called the Ivan Lendl Celebrity Golf Tournament. Still competitive at the mini-tour levels, Lendl now spends much of his time managing his daughters' golfing careers.

Lendl had a nearly complete collection of posters by Alphonse Mucha. The collection was exhibited in Prague in 2013. He sold the collection in 2014 to Czech businessman Richard Fuxa for 3.5 million dollars.

In December 2024, it was announced that Lendl would compete in a professional pickleball event at the PPA Tour's Daytona Beach Open in the 5.0 50+ category.

== See also ==
- List of ATP number 1 ranked singles players
- World number 1 male tennis player rankings
- Lendl–McEnroe rivalry
- Edberg–Lendl rivalry
- Lendl–Wilander rivalry
- Tennis male players statistics
- All-time tennis records – men's singles
- Open Era tennis records – men's singles

== Notes ==
Sporting positions
| Preceded by Jimmy Connors; John McEnroe; John McEnroe; John McEnroe; John McEnroe; John McEnroe; John McEnroe; Mats Wilander | World No. 1 February 28, 1983 - May 15, 1983; October 31, 1983 - December 11, 1983; January 9, 1984 - March 11, 1984; June 11, 1984 - June 17, 1984; July 9, 1984 - August 12, 1984; August 19, 1985 - August 25, 1985; September 9, 1985 - September 11, 1988; January 30, 1989 - August 12, 1990 | Succeeded by Jimmy Connors; John McEnroe; John McEnroe; John McEnroe; John McEnroe; John McEnroe; Mats Wilander; Stefan Edberg |
Awards and achievements
| Preceded by not awarded, 1980; Víctor Pecci, 1979 | ATP Most Improved Player; 1981 | Succeeded by Peter McNamara |
| Preceded by John McEnroe | ITF World Champion; 1985–1987 | Succeeded by Mats Wilander |
| Preceded by Boris Becker | ITF World Champion; 1990 | Succeeded by Stefan Edberg |
Records
| Preceded by Jimmy Connors | Most Weeks at World No. 1 July 23, 1990 – September 11, 2000 | Succeeded by Pete Sampras |
