= Open Era tennis records – Men's singles =

The Open Era is the current era of professional tennis. It began in 1968 when the Grand Slam tournaments allowed professional players to compete with amateurs, ending the division that had persisted since the dawn of the sport in the 19th century. The first open tournament was the 1968 British Hard Court Championships held in April, followed by the inaugural open Grand Slam tournament, the 1968 French Open, a month later. Unless otherwise sourced, all records are based on data from the Association of Tennis Professionals (ATP), the International Tennis Federation (ITF), and the official websites of the four Grand Slam tournaments. All rankings-related records are based on ATP rankings, which began in 1973. The names of active players appear in boldface.

Last updated 30th October 2026.

== Grand Slam tournaments ==
=== Career totals ===
Updated as of 2026 US Open. For equal records, entrants are ranked on the basis of who achieved the record in chronological order.

#	Titles
24	(Serbia) **Novak Djokovic**
22	(Spain) Rafael Nadal
20	(Switzerland) Roger Federer
14	(United States) Pete Sampras
11	(Sweden) Björn Borg
8	(United States) Jimmy Connors
8	(Czechoslovakia) Ivan Lendl
8	(United States) Andre Agassi
7	(United States) John McEnroe
7	(Sweden) Mats Wilander
7	(Spain) **Carlos Alcaraz**

#	Finals
38	(Serbia) **Novak Djokovic**
31	(Switzerland) Roger Federer
30	(Spain) Rafael Nadal
19	(Czechoslovakia) Ivan Lendl
18	(United States) Pete Sampras
16	(Sweden) Björn Borg
15	(United States) Jimmy Connors
15	(United States) Andre Agassi
11	(United States) John McEnroe
11	(Sweden) Mats Wilander
11	(Sweden) Stefan Edberg
11	(United Kingdom) Andy Murray

#	Semifinals
55	(Serbia) **Novak Djokovic**
46	(Switzerland) Roger Federer
38	(Spain) Rafael Nadal
31	(United States) Jimmy Connors
28	(Czechoslovakia) Ivan Lendl
26	(United States) Andre Agassi
23	(United States) Pete Sampras
21	(United Kingdom) Andy Murray
19	(United States) John McEnroe
19	(Sweden) Stefan Edberg

#	Quarterfinals
66	(Serbia) **Novak Djokovic**
58	(Switzerland) Roger Federer
47	(Spain) Rafael Nadal
41	(United States) Jimmy Connors
36	(United States) Andre Agassi
34	(Czechoslovakia) Ivan Lendl
30	(United Kingdom) Andy Murray
29	(United States) Pete Sampras
26	(United States) John McEnroe
26	(Sweden) Stefan Edberg

#	Appearances
84	(Serbia) **Novak Djokovic**
81	(Switzerland) Roger Federer
81	(Spain) Feliciano López
78	(Switzerland) Stan Wawrinka
75	(France) Richard Gasquet
71	(Spain) Fernando Verdasco
71	(France) Gaël Monfils
70	(France) Fabrice Santoro
69	(Russia) Mikhail Youzhny
68	(Germany) Philipp Kohlschreiber
68	(Spain) Rafael Nadal

==== Matches ====
#	Matches won
409	(Serbia) **Novak Djokovic**
369	(Switzerland) Roger Federer
314	(Spain) Rafael Nadal
233	(United States) Jimmy Connors
224	(United States) Andre Agassi
222	(Czechoslovakia) Ivan Lendl
203	(United States) Pete Sampras
200	(United Kingdom) Andy Murray
178	(Sweden) Stefan Edberg
167	(United States) John McEnroe
Top 10

#	Matches played
468	(Serbia) **Novak Djokovic**
429	(Switzerland) Roger Federer
358	(Spain) Rafael Nadal
282	(United States) Jimmy Connors
277	(United States) Andre Agassi
271	(Czechoslovakia) Ivan Lendl
257	(United Kingdom) Andy Murray
241	(United States) Pete Sampras
235	(Switzerland) Stan Wawrinka
225	(Sweden) Stefan Edberg
Top 10

%	W–L	Match record
89.24	141–17	(Sweden) Björn Borg
87.71	314–44	(Spain) Rafael Nadal
87.39	409–59	(Serbia) **Novak Djokovic**
86.01	369–60	(Switzerland) Roger Federer
84.23	203–38	(United States) Pete Sampras
82.62	233–49	(United States) Jimmy Connors
81.97	100–22	(Italy) **Jannik Sinner**
81.92	222–49	(Czechoslovakia) Ivan Lendl
81.46	167–38	(United States) John McEnroe
80.87	224–53	(United States) Andre Agassi
Top 10 (minimum 100 wins)

%	W–L	Finals record
87.50	7–1	(Spain) **Carlos Alcaraz**
83.33	5–1	(Australia) Rod Laver
77.78	14–4	(United States) Pete Sampras
73.33	22–8	(Spain) Rafael Nadal
71.43	5–2	(Australia) John Newcombe
71.43	5–2	(Italy) **Jannik Sinner**
68.75	11–5	(Sweden) Björn Borg
64.52	20–11	(Switzerland) Roger Federer
63.64	7–4	(United States) John McEnroe
63.64	7–4	(Sweden) Mats Wilander
minimum 5 titles

=== Grand Slam tournament achievements ===
==== Grand Slam ====
Grand Slam	Player	First–last tournaments
Grand Slam	(Australia) Rod Laver	1969 Australian Open—1969 US Open
Grand Slam	all four major titles consecutively (in a calendar year)	

==== Non-Calendar Year Grand Slam ====
NCYGS	Player	First–last tournaments
NCYGS	(Serbia) **Novak Djokovic**	2015 Wimbledon—2016 French Open
NCYGS	all four major titles consecutively (not in a calendar year)	

==== Career Grand Slam ====
CGS	Player	Event of completion
CGS	(Australia) Rod Laver	1969 US Open
CGS	(United States) Andre Agassi	1999 French Open
CGS	(Switzerland) Roger Federer	2009 French Open
CGS	(Spain) Rafael Nadal	2010 US Open
CGS	(Serbia) **Novak Djokovic**	2016 French Open
CGS	(Serbia) **Novak Djokovic** (2)	2021 French Open
CGS	(Spain) Rafael Nadal (2)	2022 Australian Open
CGS	(Serbia) **Novak Djokovic** (3)	2023 French Open
CGS	(Spain) **Carlos Alcaraz**	2026 Australian Open
CGS	each major title at least once	

Career Golden Slam	Event of completion
(United States) Andre Agassi	1999 French Open
(Spain) Rafael Nadal	2010 US Open
(Serbia) **Novak Djokovic**	2024 Olympics
Career Grand Slam + Olympic Gold (since 1988)

Career Super Slam	Event of completion
(United States) Andre Agassi	1999 French Open
(Serbia) **Novak Djokovic**	2024 Olympics
Career Golden Slam + Year-end championship

==== Minimum at each Grand Slam tournament totals ====
#	Titles
3	(Serbia) **Novak Djokovic**
2	(Spain) Rafael Nadal
1	(Australia) Rod Laver
1	(United States) Andre Agassi
1	(Switzerland) Roger Federer
1	(Spain) **Carlos Alcaraz**

#	Finals
7	(Serbia) **Novak Djokovic**
5	(Switzerland) Roger Federer
5	(Spain) Rafael Nadal
2	(Australia) Ken Rosewall
2	(Czechoslovakia) Ivan Lendl
2	(United States) Andre Agassi
1	(Australia) Rod Laver
1	(Sweden) Stefan Edberg
1	(United States) Jim Courier
1	(United Kingdom) Andy Murray
1	(Italy) **Jannik Sinner**
1	(Spain) **Carlos Alcaraz**
1	(Germany) **Alexander Zverev**

#	Semifinals
13	(Serbia) **Novak Djokovic**
8	(Switzerland) Roger Federer
7	(Spain) Rafael Nadal
5	(Czechoslovakia) Ivan Lendl
5	(United States) Andre Agassi
3	(United Kingdom) Andy Murray
2	(Australia) Ken Rosewall
2	(United States) Jimmy Connors
2	(Germany) Boris Becker
2	(Italy) **Jannik Sinner**

#	Quarterfinals
14	(Serbia) **Novak Djokovic**
12	(Switzerland) Roger Federer
8	(Spain) Rafael Nadal
7	(Czechoslovakia) Ivan Lendl
7	(United States) Andre Agassi
6	(United Kingdom) Andy Murray
4	(United States) John McEnroe
4	(Sweden) Stefan Edberg
4	(Germany) Boris Becker
4	(United States) Pete Sampras

#	Match wins
95	(Serbia) **Novak Djokovic**
73	(Switzerland) Roger Federer
58	(Spain) Rafael Nadal
48	(Czechoslovakia) Ivan Lendl
46	(United States) Andre Agassi
39	(United Kingdom) Andy Murray
31	(Croatia) **Marin Čilić**
30	(Sweden) Stefan Edberg
28	(Australia) Lleyton Hewitt
28	(Spain) David Ferrer

=== Season totals ===
4 titles
(Australia) Rod Laver	1969

3+ titles
(Serbia) **Novak Djokovic** (4)	2011, 15, 21, 23
(Switzerland) Roger Federer (3)	2004, 06–07
(Australia) Rod Laver	1969
(United States) Jimmy Connors	1974
(Sweden) Mats Wilander	1988
(Spain) Rafael Nadal	2010

2+ titles
(Serbia) **Novak Djokovic** (7)	2011, 15–16, 18–19, 21, 23
(Switzerland) Roger Federer (6)	2004–07, 09, 17
(Spain) Rafael Nadal (6)	2008, 10, 13, 17, 19, 22
(United States) Pete Sampras (4)	1993–95, 97
(Sweden) Björn Borg (3)	1978–80
(United States) Jimmy Connors (2)	1974, 82
(United States) John McEnroe (2)	1981, 84
(Czechoslovakia) Ivan Lendl (2)	1986–87
(Italy) **Jannik Sinner** (2)	2024–25
(Spain) **Carlos Alcaraz** (2)	2024–25
(Australia) Rod Laver	1969
(Australia) John Newcombe	1973
(Argentina) Guillermo Vilas	1977
(Sweden) Mats Wilander	1988
(Germany) Boris Becker	1989
(United States) Jim Courier	1992
(United States) Andre Agassi	1999
(Germany) **Alexander Zverev**	2026

4 finals
(Switzerland) Roger Federer (3)	2006–07, 09
(Serbia) **Novak Djokovic** (3)	2015, 21, 23
(Australia) Rod Laver	1969
(Italy) **Jannik Sinner**	2025
(Czechoslovakia) Ivan Lendl*	1986
* No Australian Open in 1986. Ivan Lendl made all 3 available finals.

4 semifinals
(Serbia) **Novak Djokovic** (7)	2011–13, 15, 21, 23, 25
(Switzerland) Roger Federer (5)	2005–09
(Spain) Rafael Nadal (2)	2008, 19
(Australia) Rod Laver	1969
(Australia) Tony Roche	1969
(Czechoslovakia) Ivan Lendl	1987
(United Kingdom) Andy Murray	2011
(Italy) **Jannik Sinner**	2025
(Germany) **Alexander Zverev**	2026
(Czechoslovakia) Ivan Lendl*	1986
* No Australian Open in 1986. Ivan Lendl made all 3 available SFs.

4 quarterfinals
(Serbia) **Novak Djokovic** (9)	2010–15, 21, 23, 25
(Switzerland) Roger Federer (8)	2005–12
(Spain) Rafael Nadal (5)	2008, 10–11, 18–19
(United Kingdom) Andy Murray (4)	2011–12, 14, 16
(Czechoslovakia) Ivan Lendl* (3)	1983, 87–88
(United States) Andre Agassi (2)	1995, 2001
(Spain) David Ferrer (2)	2012–13
(Italy) **Jannik Sinner** (2)	2024–25
(Australia) Rod Laver	1969
(Australia) Tony Roche	1969
(Australia) John Newcombe	1969
(United States) John McEnroe	1985
(Sweden) Mats Wilander	1988
(Sweden) Stefan Edberg	1991
(United States) Pete Sampras	1993
(Switzerland) Stan Wawrinka	2015
(Spain) **Carlos Alcaraz**	2025
(Germany) **Alexander Zverev**	2026
(Czechoslovakia) Ivan Lendl*	1986
(Germany) Boris Becker*	1986
(France) Henri Leconte*	1986
(Austria) Dominic Thiem*	2020
* No Australian Open in 1986; No Wimbledon in 2020. Players made all 3 available QFs.

==== Most seasons with at least one major title or final ====
1+ title	First–last	
(Spain) Rafael Nadal	15	2005–14, 2017–20, 2022
(Serbia) **Novak Djokovic**	13	2008, 2011–16, 2018–23
(Switzerland) Roger Federer	11	2003–10, 2012, 2017–18
(United States) Pete Sampras	10	1990, 1993-00, 2002
(Sweden) Björn Borg	8	1974–81
(United States) Andre Agassi	7	1992, 1994-95, 1999-01, 2003
(Czechoslovakia) Ivan Lendl	6	1984–87, 1989–90
(Sweden) Stefan Edberg	6	1985, 1987–88, 1990–92
(United States) Jimmy Connors	5	1974, 1976, 1978, 1982–83
(United States) John McEnroe	5	1979–81, 1983–84
(Sweden) Mats Wilander	5	1982–85, 1988
(Germany) Boris Becker	5	1985–86, 1989, 1991, 1996
(Spain) **Carlos Alcaraz**	5	2022–26
minimum 5 seasons

1+ final	First–last	
(Serbia) **Novak Djokovic**	17	2007–08, 2010–16, 2018–24, 2026
(Switzerland) Roger Federer	15	2003–12, 2014–15, 2017–19
(Spain) Rafael Nadal	15	2005–14, 2017–20, 2022
(United States) Pete Sampras	12	1990, 1992–02
(Czechoslovakia) Ivan Lendl	11	1981–91
(United States) Andre Agassi	11	1990–92, 1994–95, 1999–03, 2005
(Sweden) Björn Borg	8	1974–81
(Sweden) Stefan Edberg	8	1985, 1987–93
(Germany) Boris Becker	8	1985–86, 1988–91, 1995–96
(United States) Jimmy Connors	8	1974–78, 1982–84
(United States) John McEnroe	7	1979–85
(United Kingdom) Andy Murray	7	2008, 2010–13, 2015–16
minimum 7 seasons

==== Consecutive seasons with at least one major title or final ====
1+ title	Consecutive	
(Spain) Rafael Nadal	10	2005–14
(Sweden) Björn Borg	8	1974–81
(United States) Pete Sampras	8	1993–00
(Switzerland) Roger Federer	8	2003–10
(Serbia) **Novak Djokovic**	6	2011–16
(Serbia) **Novak Djokovic** (2)	6	2018–23
(Spain) **Carlos Alcaraz**	5	2022–26▲

1+ final	Consecutive	
(Czechoslovakia) Ivan Lendl	11	1981–91
(United States) Pete Sampras	11	1992–02
(Switzerland) Roger Federer	10	2003–12
(Spain) Rafael Nadal	10	2005–14
(Sweden) Björn Borg	8	1974–81
(Serbia) **Novak Djokovic**	7	2010–16
(Serbia) **Novak Djokovic** (2)	7	2018–24

=== Per Grand Slam tournament ===
==== Titles per tournament ====
#	Australian Open
10	(Serbia) **Novak Djokovic**
6	(Switzerland) Roger Federer
4	(United States) Andre Agassi
3	(Sweden) Mats Wilander
2	(Australia) Ken Rosewall
2	(Australia) John Newcombe
2	(Argentina) Guillermo Vilas
2	(South Africa) / (United States) Johan Kriek
2	(Sweden) Stefan Edberg
2	(Czechoslovakia) Ivan Lendl
2	(Germany) Boris Becker
2	(United States) Jim Courier
2	(United States) Pete Sampras
2	(Spain) Rafael Nadal
2	(Italy) **Jannik Sinner**

#	French Open
14	(Spain) Rafael Nadal
6	(Sweden) Björn Borg
3	(Czechoslovakia) Ivan Lendl
3	(Sweden) Mats Wilander
3	(Brazil) Gustavo Kuerten
3	(Serbia) **Novak Djokovic**
2	(Czechoslovakia) Jan Kodeš
2	(United States) Jim Courier
2	(Spain) Sergi Bruguera
2	(Spain) **Carlos Alcaraz**

#	Wimbledon
8	(Switzerland) Roger Federer
7	(United States) Pete Sampras
7	(Serbia) **Novak Djokovic**
5	(Sweden) Björn Borg
3	(United States) John McEnroe
3	(Germany) Boris Becker
2	(Australia) Rod Laver
2	(Australia) John Newcombe
2	(United States) Jimmy Connors
2	(Sweden) Stefan Edberg
2	(Spain) Rafael Nadal
2	(United Kingdom) Andy Murray
2	(Spain) **Carlos Alcaraz**
2	(Italy) **Jannik Sinner**

#	US Open
5	(United States) Jimmy Connors
5	(United States) Pete Sampras
5	(Switzerland) Roger Federer
4	(United States) John McEnroe
4	(Spain) Rafael Nadal
4	(Serbia) **Novak Djokovic**
3	(Czechoslovakia) Ivan Lendl
2	(Sweden) Stefan Edberg
2	(United States) Andre Agassi
2	(Australia) Patrick Rafter
2	(Spain) **Carlos Alcaraz**

==== Finals per tournament ====
#	Australian Open	Record
11	(Serbia) **Novak Djokovic**	10–1
7	(Switzerland) Roger Federer	6–1
6	(Spain) Rafael Nadal	2–4
5	(Sweden) Stefan Edberg	2–3
5	(United Kingdom) Andy Murray	0–5
4	(United States) Andre Agassi	4–0
4	(Sweden) Mats Wilander	3–1
4	(Czechoslovakia) Ivan Lendl	2–2
3	(Argentina) Guillermo Vilas	2–1
3	(United States) Pete Sampras	2–1
3	(Russia) Marat Safin	1–2
3	(Russia) **Daniil Medvedev**	0–3

#	French Open	Record
14	(Spain) Rafael Nadal	14–0
7	(Serbia) **Novak Djokovic**	3–4
6	(Sweden) Björn Borg	6–0
5	(Czechoslovakia) Ivan Lendl	3–2
5	(Sweden) Mats Wilander	3–2
5	(Switzerland) Roger Federer	1–4
4	(Argentina) Guillermo Vilas	1–3
3	(United States) Andre Agassi	1–2
3	(United States) Jim Courier	2–1
3	(Spain) Sergi Bruguera	2–1
3	(Brazil) Gustavo Kuerten	3–0

#	Wimbledon	Record
12	(Switzerland) Roger Federer	8–4
10	(Serbia) **Novak Djokovic**	7–3
7	(United States) Pete Sampras	7–0
7	(Germany) Boris Becker	3–4
6	(Sweden) Björn Borg	5–1
6	(United States) Jimmy Connors	2–4
5	(United States) John McEnroe	3–2
5	(Spain) Rafael Nadal	2–3
4	(Croatia) Goran Ivanišević	1–3
3	(Australia) John Newcombe	2–1
3	(Sweden) Stefan Edberg	2–1
3	(United States) Andy Roddick	0–3
3	(United Kingdom) Andy Murray	2–1
3	(Spain) **Carlos Alcaraz**	2–1

#	US Open	Record
10	(Serbia) **Novak Djokovic**	4–6
8	(United States) Pete Sampras	5–3
8	(Czechoslovakia) Ivan Lendl	3–5
7	(United States) Jimmy Connors	5–2
7	(Switzerland) Roger Federer	5–2
6	(United States) Andre Agassi	2–4
5	(United States) John McEnroe	4–1
5	(Spain) Rafael Nadal	4–1
4	(Sweden) Björn Borg	0–4
3	(Russia) **Daniil Medvedev**	1–2

==== Match record per tournament ====
- Minimum 30 wins (correct **as of 2026 US Open**)

%	W–L	Australian Open
90.57	48–5	(United States) Andre Agassi
90.43	104–11	(Serbia) **Novak Djokovic**
87.18	102–15	(Switzerland) Roger Federer
84.85	56–10	(Sweden) Stefan Edberg
83.72	36–7	(Sweden) Mats Wilander
83.33	45–9	(United States) Pete Sampras
82.80	77–16	(Spain) Rafael Nadal
82.76	48–10	(Czechoslovakia) Ivan Lendl
81.40	35–8	(United States) Jim Courier
81.08	30–7	(Australia) John Newcombe

%	W–L	French Open
96.55	112–4	(Spain) Rafael Nadal
96.08	49–2	(Sweden) Björn Borg
85.12	103–18	(Serbia) **Novak Djokovic**
83.93	47–9	(Sweden) Mats Wilander
81.82	36–8	(Brazil) Gustavo Kuerten
81.82	45–10	(Germany) **Alexander Zverev**
81.63	40–9	(United States) Jim Courier
81.54	53–12	(Czechoslovakia) Ivan Lendl
81.11	73–17	(Switzerland) Roger Federer
78.00	39–11	(Czechoslovakia) Jan Kodeš

%	W–L	Wimbledon
92.73	51–4	(Sweden) Björn Borg
90.00	63–7	(United States) Pete Sampras
88.43	107–14	(Serbia) **Novak Djokovic**
88.24	105–14	(Switzerland) Roger Federer
86.49	32–5	(Australia) John Newcombe
85.54	71–12	(Germany) Boris Becker
84.29	59–11	(United States) John McEnroe
82.86	58–12	(Spain) Rafael Nadal
82.43	61–13	(United Kingdom) Andy Murray
82.35	84–18	(United States) Jimmy Connors

%	W–L	US Open
88.75	71–9	(United States) Pete Sampras
86.41	89–14	(Switzerland) Roger Federer
85.59	95–16	(Serbia) **Novak Djokovic**
85.22	98–17	(United States) Jimmy Connors
84.88	73–13	(Czechoslovakia) Ivan Lendl
84.81	67–12	(Spain) Rafael Nadal
84.42	65–12	(United States) John McEnroe
83.33	30–6	(Australia) Ken Rosewall
81.63	40–9	(Sweden) Björn Borg
80.61	79–19	(United States) Andre Agassi

==== Match wins per tournament ====
- Top 10 leaders

#	Australian Open
104	(Serbia) **Novak Djokovic**
102	(Switzerland) Roger Federer
77	(Spain) Rafael Nadal
56	(Sweden) Stefan Edberg
51	(United Kingdom) Andy Murray
48	(Czechoslovakia) Ivan Lendl
48	(United States) Andre Agassi
47	(Czech Republic) Tomáš Berdych
45	(United States) Pete Sampras
45	(Switzerland) Stan Wawrinka

#	French Open
112	(Spain) Rafael Nadal
103	(Serbia) **Novak Djokovic**
73	(Switzerland) Roger Federer
57	(Argentina) Guillermo Vilas
53	(Czechoslovakia) Ivan Lendl
51	(United States) Andre Agassi
49	(Sweden) Björn Borg
47	(Sweden) Mats Wilander
46	(Switzerland) Stan Wawrinka
45	(Germany) **Alexander Zverev**

#	Wimbledon
107	(Serbia) **Novak Djokovic**
105	(Switzerland) Roger Federer
84	(United States) Jimmy Connors
71	(Germany) Boris Becker
63	(United States) Pete Sampras
61	(United Kingdom) Andy Murray
59	(United States) John McEnroe
58	(Spain) Rafael Nadal
51	(Sweden) Björn Borg
49	(Sweden) Stefan Edberg
49	(Croatia) Goran Ivanišević

#	US Open
98	(United States) Jimmy Connors
95	(Serbia) **Novak Djokovic**
89	(Switzerland) Roger Federer
79	(United States) Andre Agassi
73	(Czechoslovakia) Ivan Lendl
71	(United States) Pete Sampras
67	(Spain) Rafael Nadal
65	(United States) John McEnroe
49	(United Kingdom) Andy Murray
47	(Australia) Lleyton Hewitt

==== Events won with no sets dropped ====
#	Player	Events
4	(Spain) Rafael Nadal	French Open (2008, 2010, 2017, 2020)
3	(Sweden) Björn Borg	Wimbledon (1976), French Open (1978, (Note: Fewest games (32) lost winning a tournament.) 1980)
2	(Switzerland) Roger Federer	Australian Open (2007), Wimbledon (2017)
1	(Australia) Ken Rosewall	Australian Open (1971)
1	(Romania) Ilie Năstase	French Open (1973)

- Most sets dropped en route to the title were 8: Borg in 1974, Becker in 1985 and Kuerten in 1997.

=== Consecutive totals ===
▲ indicates an active streak

==== Spanning consecutive tournaments ====
#	Titles (3+)	Years
4	(Australia) Rod Laver	1969
4	(Serbia) **Novak Djokovic**	2015–16
3	(United States) Pete Sampras	1993–94
3	(Switzerland) Roger Federer	2005–06
3	(Switzerland) Roger Federer (2)	2006–07
3	(Spain) Rafael Nadal	2010
3	(Serbia) **Novak Djokovic** (2)	2011–12
3	(Serbia) **Novak Djokovic** (3)	2018–19
3	(Serbia) **Novak Djokovic** (4)	2021

#	Finals (4+)	Years
10	(Switzerland) Roger Federer	2005–07
8	(Switzerland) Roger Federer (2)	2008–10
6	(Serbia) **Novak Djokovic**	2015–16
5	(Spain) Rafael Nadal	2011–12
5	(Serbia) **Novak Djokovic** (2)	2020–21
5	(Italy) **Jannik Sinner**	2024–25
4	(Australia) Rod Laver	1969
4	(United States) Andre Agassi	1999–00
4	(Serbia) **Novak Djokovic** (3)	2011–12
4	(Serbia) **Novak Djokovic** (4)	2023
4	(Spain) **Carlos Alcaraz**	2025–26

#	Semifinals (6+)	Years
23	(Switzerland) Roger Federer	2004–10
14	(Serbia) **Novak Djokovic**	2010–13
10	(Czechoslovakia) Ivan Lendl	1985–88
9	(Serbia) **Novak Djokovic** (2)	2014–16
7	(Spain) Rafael Nadal	2018–19
6	(Czechoslovakia) Ivan Lendl (2)	1983–84
6	(Italy) **Jannik Sinner**	2024–26

#	Quarterfinals (9+)	Years
36	(Switzerland) Roger Federer	2004–13
28	(Serbia) **Novak Djokovic**	2009–16
14	(Czechoslovakia) Ivan Lendl	1985–89
11	(Spain) Rafael Nadal	2009–12
11	(Spain) Rafael Nadal (2)	2017–20
10	(United States) Pete Sampras	1992–94
10	(Spain) David Ferrer	2012–14
9	(United Kingdom) Andy Murray	2011–13
9	(United Kingdom) Andy Murray (2)	2013–15
9	(Italy) **Jannik Sinner**	2024–26

#	Appearances (50+)	Years
79	(Spain) Feliciano López	2002–22
67	(Spain) Fernando Verdasco	2003–20
66	(Italy) Andreas Seppi	2005–22
65	(Switzerland) Roger Federer	2000–16
58	(Bulgaria) **Grigor Dimitrov**	2011–25
56	(South Africa) Wayne Ferreira	1991–04
54	(Sweden) Stefan Edberg	1983–96
52	(Czech Republic) Tomas Berdych	2003–16
51	(Serbia) **Novak Djokovic**	2005–17

===== Winning streaks =====
#	Matches	Years
30	(Serbia) **Novak Djokovic**	2015–16
27	(Switzerland) Roger Federer	2005–06
27	(Switzerland) Roger Federer (2)	2006–07
27	(Serbia) **Novak Djokovic** (2)	2011–12
27	(Serbia) **Novak Djokovic** (3)	2021
27	(Serbia) **Novak Djokovic** (4)	2022–23
26	(Australia) Rod Laver	1969
26	(Serbia) **Novak Djokovic** (5)	2018–19
25	(United States) Pete Sampras	1993–94
25	(Spain) Rafael Nadal	2010–11

==== Spanning non-consecutive tournaments ====
#	Finals won	Years
8	(United States) Pete Sampras	1995–2000
7	(Switzerland) Roger Federer	2003–06
7	(Spain) Rafael Nadal	2008–11
5	(Australia) Rod Laver	1968–69
5	(Australia) John Newcombe	1970–75
5	(Serbia) **Novak Djokovic**	2018–20
5	(Spain) Rafael Nadal (2)	2019–22
5	(Spain) **Carlos Alcaraz**	2022–25

#	Semifinals won	Years
16	(Spain) Rafael Nadal	2010–18
14	(Sweden) Björn Borg	1976–81
12	(Serbia) **Novak Djokovic**	2019–23
11	(United States) Jimmy Connors	1974–78
10	(Switzerland) Roger Federer	2005–07
10	(Serbia) **Novak Djokovic** (2)	2015–19

#	Quarterfinals won	Years
25	(Switzerland) Roger Federer	2003–10
17	(Czechoslovakia) Ivan Lendl	1983–88
14	(Serbia) **Novak Djokovic**	2010–13
11	(United States) Jimmy Connors	1976–80
11	(Serbia) **Novak Djokovic** (2)	2018–21

==== Consecutive titles per tournament ====
#	Australian Open	Years
3	(Serbia) **Novak Djokovic**	2011–13
3	(Serbia) **Novak Djokovic** (2)	2019–21
2	(Australia) Ken Rosewall	1971–72
2	(Argentina) Guillermo Vilas	1978–79
2	(South Africa) / (United States) Johan Kriek	1981–82
2	(Sweden) Mats Wilander	1983–84
2	(Sweden) Stefan Edberg	1985–87
2	(Czechoslovakia) Ivan Lendl	1989–90
2	(United States) Jim Courier	1992–93
2	(United States) Andre Agassi	2000–01
2	(Switzerland) Roger Federer	2006–07
2	(Serbia) **Novak Djokovic** (3)	2015–16
2	(Switzerland) Roger Federer (2)	2017–18
2	(Italy) **Jannik Sinner**	2024–25

#	French Open	Years
5	(Spain) Rafael Nadal	2010–14
4	(Sweden) Björn Borg	1978–81
4	(Spain) Rafael Nadal (2)	2005–08
4	(Spain) Rafael Nadal (3)	2017–20
2	(Czechoslovakia) Jan Kodeš	1970–71
2	(Sweden) Björn Borg (2)	1974–75
2	(Czechoslovakia) Ivan Lendl	1986–87
2	(United States) Jim Courier	1991–92
2	(Spain) Sergi Bruguera	1993–94
2	(Brazil) Gustavo Kuerten	2000–01
2	(Spain) **Carlos Alcaraz**	2024–25

#	Wimbledon	Years
5	(Sweden) Björn Borg	1976–80
5	(Switzerland) Roger Federer	2003–07
4	(United States) Pete Sampras	1997–2000
4	(Serbia) **Novak Djokovic**	2018–22
3	(United States) Pete Sampras (2)	1993–95
2	(Australia) Rod Laver	1968–69
2	(Australia) John Newcombe	1970–71
2	(United States) John McEnroe	1983–84
2	(Germany) Boris Becker	1985–86
2	(Serbia) **Novak Djokovic** (2)	2014–15
2	(Spain) **Carlos Alcaraz**	2023–24
2	(Italy) **Jannik Sinner**	2025–26▲

#	US Open	Years
5	(Switzerland) Roger Federer	2004–08
3	(United States) John McEnroe	1979–81
3	(Czechoslovakia) Ivan Lendl	1985–87
2	(United States) Jimmy Connors	1982–83
2	(Sweden) Stefan Edberg	1991–92
2	(United States) Pete Sampras	1995–96
2	(Australia) Pat Rafter	1997–98

===== Consecutive match wins per tournament =====
#	Australian Open	Years
33	(Serbia) **Novak Djokovic**	2019–24
26	(United States) Andre Agassi	2000–04
25	(Serbia) **Novak Djokovic** (2)	2011–14
20	(Czechoslovakia) Ivan Lendl	1989–91
19	(Switzerland) Roger Federer	2006–08
19	(Italy) **Jannik Sinner**	2024–26

#	French Open	Years
39	(Spain) Rafael Nadal	2010–15
35	(Spain) Rafael Nadal (2)	2016–21
31	(Spain) Rafael Nadal (3)	2005–09
28	(Sweden) Björn Borg	1978–81
20	(United States) Jim Courier	1991–93

#	Wimbledon	Years
41	(Sweden) Björn Borg	1976–81
40	(Switzerland) Roger Federer	2003–08
34	(Serbia) **Novak Djokovic**	2018–23
31	(United States) Pete Sampras	1997–2001
25	(United States) Pete Sampras (2)	1993–96

#	US Open	Years
40	(Switzerland) Roger Federer	2004–09
27	(Czechoslovakia) Ivan Lendl	1985–88
25	(United States) John McEnroe	1979–82
19	(United States) Jimmy Connors	1982–84
17	(United States) Pete Sampras	1995–97

=== Court type totals ===
==== Match record ====
- Minimum 30 wins (correct **as of 2026 US Open**)

%	W–L	Hard
88.05	199–27	(Serbia) **Novak Djokovic**
86.82	191–29	(Switzerland) Roger Federer
86.57	116–18	(United States) Pete Sampras
85.90	67–11	(United States) Jimmy Connors
85.37	105–18	(Czechoslovakia) Ivan Lendl
85.19	46–8	(Spain) **Carlos Alcaraz**
84.11	127–24	(United States) Andre Agassi
83.91	73–14	(United States) John McEnroe
83.72	144–28	(Spain) Rafael Nadal
81.97	50–11	(Italy) **Jannik Sinner**

%	W–L	Clay
96.55	112–4	(Spain) Rafael Nadal
92.65	63–5	(Sweden) Björn Borg
85.12	103–18	(Serbia) **Novak Djokovic**
83.93	47–9	(Sweden) Mats Wilander
81.82	36–8	(Brazil) Gustavo Kuerten
81.82	45–10	(Germany) **Alexander Zverev**
81.63	40–9	(United States) Jim Courier
81.54	53–12	(Czechoslovakia) Ivan Lendl
81.11	73–17	(Switzerland) Roger Federer
79.73	59–15	(United States) Jimmy Connors

%	W–L	Grass
90.00	63–7	(United States) Pete Sampras
88.43	107–14	(Serbia) **Novak Djokovic**
88.24	105–14	(Switzerland) Roger Federer
87.50	56–8	(Sweden) Björn Borg
84.62	44–8	(Australia) Rod Laver
83.70	77–15	(Germany) Boris Becker
83.54	66–13	(United States) John McEnroe
83.18	89–18	(Australia) John Newcombe
82.86	58–12	(Spain) Rafael Nadal
82.43	61–13	(United Kingdom) Andy Murray

==== Match wins ====
#	Hard
199	(Serbia) **Novak Djokovic**
191	(Switzerland) Roger Federer
144	(Spain) Rafael Nadal
127	(United States) Andre Agassi
116	(United States) Pete Sampras
105	(Czechoslovakia) Ivan Lendl
100	(United Kingdom) Andy Murray
91	(Switzerland) Stan Wawrinka
84	(Sweden) Stefan Edberg
81	(United States) Andy Roddick

#	Clay
112	(Spain) Rafael Nadal
103	(Serbia) **Novak Djokovic**
74	(Argentina) Guillermo Vilas
73	(Switzerland) Roger Federer
63	(Sweden) Björn Borg
59	(United States) Jimmy Connors
53	(Czechoslovakia) Ivan Lendl
51	(United States) Andre Agassi
48	(Czechoslovakia) Jan Kodeš
47	(Sweden) Mats Wilander

#	Grass
107	(United States) Jimmy Connors
107	(Serbia) **Novak Djokovic**
105	(Switzerland) Roger Federer
89	(Australia) John Newcombe
77	(Australia) Ken Rosewall
77	(Germany) Boris Becker
74	(United States) Arthur Ashe
69	(United States) Stan Smith
66	(United States) John McEnroe
64	(Czechoslovakia) Ivan Lendl
64	(Sweden) Stefan Edberg

== Year-end championships ==
There have been three prominent Year-end Championships in the Open Era, each involving only the top performers for the given year. Those championships have been the most coveted titles after the four majors during the Open Era.
(1970–present) This is a combination of the YECs (Year-end Championships) for two separate tours: the ITF Grand Prix that ran until 1989 and the ATP Tour that replaced it. For record-keeping purposes, the ATP has incorporated the entire history of the ITF "Masters Grand Prix" alongside its ATP Finals tournament; thus they are both listed as "ATP" here. In total, these YECs have been held at numerous venues around the globe and played on several surfaces (indoor hard since 2006).
(1971–89) The WCT Finals, as the YEC for the World Championship Tennis tour, was held in Dallas, Texas and played on indoor carpet courts.
(1990–99) The Grand Slam Cup (GSC) was an ITF tournament for the top performers in the year's Grand Slam tournaments. It was held in Munich, Germany and played on indoor carpet courts.

=== Overall totals ===
Ordered by most titles won at one year-end championship (correct as of 2025 ATP Finals).

Titles	ATP Finals	WCT Finals	Slam Cup	Events
(Serbia) **Novak Djokovic**	**7**	—N/a	—N/a	2008, 2012, 2013, 2014, 2015, 2022, 2023
(Switzerland) Roger Federer	6	—N/a	—N/a	2003, 2004, 2006, 2007, 2010, 2011
(United States) John McEnroe	3	**5**	—N/a	1978, 1979^{WCT}, 1981^{WCT}, 1983, 1983^{WCT}, 1984, 1984^{WCT}, 1989^{WCT}
(Czechoslovakia) Ivan Lendl	5	2	—N/a	1981, 1982, 1982^{WCT}, 1985, 1985^{WCT}, 1986, 1987
(United States) Pete Sampras	5	—N/a	**2**	1990^{GSC}, 1991, 1994, 1996, 1997, 1997^{GSC}, 1999
(Romania) Ilie Năstase	4	—N/a	—N/a	1971, 1972, 1973, 1975
(Germany) Boris Becker	3	1	1	1988, 1988^{WCT}, 1992, 1995, 1996^{GSC}
(Sweden) Björn Borg	2	1	—N/a	1976^{WCT}, 1979, 1980
(United States) Jimmy Connors	1	2	—N/a	1977, 1977^{WCT}, 1980^{WCT}
(Australia) Ken Rosewall	—N/a	2	—N/a	1971^{WCT}, 1972^{WCT}
(Australia) Lleyton Hewitt	2	—N/a	—N/a	2001, 2002
(Germany) **Alexander Zverev**	2	—N/a	—N/a	2018, 2021
(Italy) **Jannik Sinner**	2	—N/a	—N/a	2024, 2025
(United States) Stan Smith	1	1	—N/a	1970, 1973^{WCT}
(Germany) Michael Stich	1	—N/a	1	1992^{GSC}, 1993

=== ATP totals ===
#	Titles
7	(Serbia) **Novak Djokovic**
6	(Switzerland) Roger Federer
5	(Czechoslovakia) Ivan Lendl
5	(United States) Pete Sampras
4	(Romania) Ilie Năstase
3	(United States) John McEnroe
3	(Germany) Boris Becker
2	(Sweden) Björn Borg
2	(Australia) Lleyton Hewitt
2	(Germany) **Alexander Zverev**
2	(Italy) **Jannik Sinner**
minimum 2 titles

#	Finals
10	(Switzerland) Roger Federer
9	(Czechoslovakia) Ivan Lendl
9	(Serbia) **Novak Djokovic**
8	(Germany) Boris Becker
6	(United States) Pete Sampras
4	(Romania) Ilie Năstase
4	(Sweden) Björn Borg
4	(United States) John McEnroe
4	(United States) Andre Agassi
3	(Australia) Lleyton Hewitt
3	(Italy) **Jannik Sinner**
3	(Germany) **Alexander Zverev**
minimum 3 finals

#	Semifinals
16	(Switzerland) Roger Federer
12	(Czechoslovakia) Ivan Lendl
12	(Serbia) **Novak Djokovic**
10	(United States) Pete Sampras
9	(Germany) Boris Becker
7	(United States) Jimmy Connors
7	(United States) John McEnroe
6	(United States) Andre Agassi
6	(Spain) Rafael Nadal
5	(Argentina) Guillermo Vilas
5	(Sweden) Stefan Edberg
5	(Germany) **Alexander Zverev**
minimum 5 semifinals

#	Appearances
17	(Switzerland) Roger Federer
16	(Serbia) **Novak Djokovic**
13	(United States) Andre Agassi
12	(Czech Republic) Ivan Lendl
11	(United States) Jimmy Connors
11	(Germany) Boris Becker
11	(United States) Pete Sampras
11	(Spain) Rafael Nadal
9	(United States) John McEnroe
9	(Sweden) Stefan Edberg
9	(Germany) **Alexander Zverev**
minimum 9 appearances

#	Match wins
59	(Switzerland) Roger Federer
50	(Serbia) **Novak Djokovic**
39	(Czechoslovakia) Ivan Lendl
36	(Germany) Boris Becker
35	(United States) Pete Sampras
22	(Romania) Ilie Năstase
22	(United States) Andre Agassi
22	(Germany) **Alexander Zverev**
21	(Spain) Rafael Nadal
minimum 20 wins

%	W–L	Match record
88.00	22–3	(Romania) Ilie Năstase
79.59	39–10	(Czechoslovakia) Ivan Lendl
77.63	59–17	(Switzerland) Roger Federer
73.53	50–18	(Serbia) **Novak Djokovic**
73.47	36–13	(Germany) Boris Becker
71.43	35–14	(United States) Pete Sampras
63.33	19–11	(United States) John McEnroe
62.86	22–13	(Germany) **Alexander Zverev**
59.26	16–11	(Argentina) Guillermo Vilas
59.26	16–11	(United Kingdom) Andy Murray
Top 10 (minimum 25 matches)

Not losing a set	Events	
(Czechoslovakia) Ivan Lendl	3	1982, 85–86
(Italy) **Jannik Sinner**	2	2024–25
(United States) John McEnroe	1	1983

=== WCT totals ===
#	Titles
5	(United States) John McEnroe
2	(Australia) Ken Rosewall
2	(United States) Jimmy Connors
2	(Czechoslovakia) Ivan Lendl

#	Finals
8	(United States) John McEnroe
4	(Sweden) Björn Borg
3	(United States) Jimmy Connors
3	(Czechoslovakia) Ivan Lendl
2	(Australia) Ken Rosewall
2	(Australia) Rod Laver
2	(United States) Arthur Ashe
2	(Germany) Boris Becker

#	Semifinals
9	(United States) John McEnroe
5	(Sweden) Björn Borg
5	(United States) Jimmy Connors
5	(Czechoslovakia) Ivan Lendl
4	(Australia) Rod Laver
4	(United States) Arthur Ashe
4	(United States) Vitas Gerulaitis

#	Appearances
9	(United States) John McEnroe
6	(United States) Arthur Ashe
5	(Australia) Rod Laver
5	(Sweden) Björn Borg
5	(United States) Vitas Gerulaitis
5	(United States) Jimmy Connors
5	(Czechoslovakia) Ivan Lendl

#	Match wins
21	(United States) John McEnroe
10	(Sweden) Björn Borg
10	(United States) Jimmy Connors
10	(Czechoslovakia) Ivan Lendl
7	(Australia) Ken Rosewall
7	(United States) Arthur Ashe
7	(United States) Vitas Gerulaitis

%	W–L	Match record
87.5	7–1	(Australia) Ken Rosewall
84.0	21–4	(United States) John McEnroe
83.3	5–1	(Germany) Boris Becker
76.9	10–3	(Sweden) Björn Borg
76.9	10–3	(United States) Jimmy Connors
76.9	10–3	(Czechoslovakia) Ivan Lendl
minimum 5 wins

Not losing a set	Events	
(United States) John McEnroe	2	1981, 84

== ATP Masters 1000 tournaments ==
(1970–1989) Before the ATP took control of the men's professional tour in 1990, the Grand Prix Super Series was the highest class of events after the four majors and the Year-end Championships but unlike the Masters series, the participation of the top players was not mandatory.

(1990–present) The ATP 1000 events are an annual series of nine top-level tournaments featuring the top professional men players. The ATP 1000 events along with the Grand Slam tournaments and Year-end Championships constitute the most coveted titles on the annual ATP Tour calendar.

=== ATP Tour totals ===
Correct as of 2026 Paris Masters with (▲) indicating active streaks

#	Titles
40	(Serbia) **Novak Djokovic**
36	(Spain) Rafael Nadal
28	(Switzerland) Roger Federer
17	(United States) Andre Agassi
14	(United Kingdom) Andy Murray
11	(United States) Pete Sampras
10	(Italy) **Jannik Sinner**
9	(Spain) **Carlos Alcaraz**
8	(Austria) Thomas Muster
7	(United States) Michael Chang
7	(Germany) **Alexander Zverev**

#	Finals
60	(Serbia) **Novak Djokovic**
53	(Spain) Rafael Nadal
50	(Switzerland) Roger Federer
22	(United States) Andre Agassi
21	(United Kingdom) Andy Murray
19	(United States) Pete Sampras
14	(Italy) **Jannik Sinner**
13	(Germany) **Alexander Zverev**
11	(Germany) Boris Becker
11	(Russia) **Daniil Medvedev**
11	(Spain) **Carlos Alcaraz**

#	Match wins
421	(Serbia) **Novak Djokovic**
410	(Spain) Rafael Nadal
381	(Switzerland) Roger Federer
230	(United Kingdom) Andy Murray
209	(United States) Andre Agassi
191	(Czech Republic) Tomáš Berdych
190	(United States) Pete Sampras
189	(Spain) David Ferrer
187	(Germany) **Alexander Zverev**
166	(Switzerland) Stan Wawrinka

%	W–L	Match record
82.00	410–90	(Spain) Rafael Nadal
80.92	123–29	(Italy) **Jannik Sinner**
80.81	421–100	(Serbia) **Novak Djokovic**
77.91	381–108	(Switzerland) Roger Federer
74.11	209–73	(United States) Andre Agassi
73.08	190–70	(United States) Pete Sampras
72.00	108–42	(Sweden) Stefan Edberg
70.30	187–79	(Germany) **Alexander Zverev**
69.49	230–101	(United Kingdom) Andy Murray
69.18	101–45	(Austria) Thomas Muster
minimum 100 wins

#	Not losing a set
11	(Serbia) **Novak Djokovic**
8	(Spain) Rafael Nadal
7	(Switzerland) Roger Federer
4	(United Kingdom) Andy Murray
3	(Italy) **Jannik Sinner**
2	(United States) Pete Sampras
2	(Chile) Marcelo Ríos
minimum 2 titles

#	Titles in a season	Year(s)
6	(Serbia) **Novak Djokovic**	2015
5	(Serbia) **Novak Djokovic**	2011
5	(Spain) Rafael Nadal	2013
5	(Italy) **Jannik Sinner**	2026
4	(Switzerland) Roger Federer	2005, 2006
4	(Serbia) **Novak Djokovic**	2014, 2016
4	(Spain) Rafael Nadal	2005
minimum 4 titles

=== Career Golden Masters ===
CGM	Player	Event of completion
CGM	(Serbia) **Novak Djokovic** (2)	2018 Cincinnati Masters
CGM	(Serbia) **Novak Djokovic** (2)	2020 Cincinnati Masters
CGM	(Italy) **Jannik Sinner**	2026 Italian Open
CGM	all nine active ATP Masters 1000 titles throughout player's career	

== All tournaments ==
=== Career totals ===
Match stats correct (as of 2026 Paris Masters).

==== Titles & finals ====
#	Titles
109	(United States) Jimmy Connors
103	(Switzerland) Roger Federer
102	(Serbia) **Novak Djokovic**
94	(Czechoslovakia) Ivan Lendl
92	(Spain) Rafael Nadal
77	(United States) John McEnroe
72	(Australia) Rod Laver
66	(Sweden) Björn Borg
64	(Romania) Ilie Năstase
64	(United States) Pete Sampras
62	(Argentina) Guillermo Vilas
60	(United States) Andre Agassi
49	(Germany) Boris Becker
48	(United States) Stan Smith
46	(United Kingdom) Andy Murray
44	(Austria) Thomas Muster
41	(Sweden) Stefan Edberg
minimum 40 titles

#	Finals
164	(United States) Jimmy Connors
157	(Switzerland) Roger Federer
146	(Czechoslovakia) Ivan Lendl
146	(Serbia) **Novak Djokovic**
131	(Spain) Rafael Nadal
109	(United States) John McEnroe
105	(Romania) Ilie Năstase
104	(Argentina) Guillermo Vilas
99	(Australia) Rod Laver
93	(Sweden) Björn Borg
90	(United States) Andre Agassi
88	(United States) Pete Sampras
77	(Germany) Boris Becker
77	(Sweden) Stefan Edberg
74	(United States) Stan Smith
71	(United Kingdom) Andy Murray
minimum 70 finals

%	W–L	Finals record
80.00	44–11	(Austria) Thomas Muster
72.73	64–24	(United States) Pete Sampras
72.73	72–27	(Australia) Rod Laver
70.97	66–27	(Sweden) Björn Borg
70.64	77–32	(United States) John McEnroe
70.23	92–39	(Spain) Rafael Nadal
69.86	102–44	(Serbia) **Novak Djokovic**
66.67	60–30	(United States) Andre Agassi
66.46	109–55	(United States) Jimmy Connors
65.61	103–54	(Switzerland) Roger Federer
64.86	48–26	(United States) Stan Smith
64.79	46–25	(United Kingdom) Andy Murray
64.38	94–52	(Czechoslovakia) Ivan Lendl
63.64	49–28	(Germany) Boris Becker
60.95	64–41	(Romania) Ilie Năstase
59.62	62–42	(Argentina) Guillermo Vilas
53.25	41–36	(Sweden) Stefan Edberg
minimum 40 titles and over 50 %

==== Matches ====
#	Matches won
1274	(United States) Jimmy Connors
1251	(Switzerland) Roger Federer
1184	(Serbia) **Novak Djokovic**
1080	(Spain) Rafael Nadal
1068	(Czechoslovakia) Ivan Lendl
951	(Argentina) Guillermo Vilas
908	(Romania) Ilie Năstase
883	(United States) John McEnroe
870	(United States) Andre Agassi
801	(Sweden) Stefan Edberg
799	(United States) Arthur Ashe
779	(United States) Stan Smith
762	(United States) Pete Sampras
739	(United Kingdom) Andy Murray
734	(Spain) David Ferrer
724	(Spain) Manuel Orantes
713	(Germany) Boris Becker
702	(United States) Brian Gottfried
minimum 700 wins

#	Matches played
1557	(United States) Jimmy Connors
1526	(Switzerland) Roger Federer
1427	(Serbia) **Novak Djokovic**
1310	(Czechoslovakia) Ivan Lendl
1308	(Spain) Rafael Nadal
1248	(Argentina) Guillermo Vilas
1242	(Romania) Ilie Năstase
1144	(United States) Andre Agassi
1111	(Spain) David Ferrer
1084	(United States) Stan Smith
1081	(United States) John McEnroe
1071	(Sweden) Stefan Edberg
1041	(United States) Arthur Ashe
1032	(United States) Brian Gottfried
1025	(Australia) John Alexander
1018	(France) Richard Gasquet
1015	(Spain) Manuel Orantes
1006	(Spain) Fernando Verdasco
1001	(United Kingdom) Andy Murray
minimum 1000 matches

%	W–L	Match record
82.97	1184–243	(Serbia) **Novak Djokovic**
82.57	1080–228	(Spain) Rafael Nadal
82.37	654–140	(Sweden) Björn Borg
81.98	1251–275	(Switzerland) Roger Federer
81.82	1274–283	(United States) Jimmy Connors
81.68	883–198	(United States) John McEnroe
81.53	1068–242	(Czechoslovakia) Ivan Lendl
79.78	576–146	(Australia) Rod Laver
77.44	762–222	(United States) Pete Sampras
76.91	713–214	(Germany) Boris Becker
76.20	951–297	(Argentina) Guillermo Vilas
76.05	870–274	(United States) Andre Agassi
75.45	799–260	(United States) Arthur Ashe
74.79	801–270	(Sweden) Stefan Edberg
74.18	612–213	(United States) Andy Roddick
73.98	546–192	(Australia) Ken Rosewall
73.83	739–262	(United Kingdom) Andy Murray
73.11	908–334	(Romania) Ilie Năstase
72.01	571–222	(Sweden) Mats Wilander
71.86	779–305	(United States) Stan Smith
Top 20 (Minimum 500 wins)

==== vs. Top 10 ====
#	Matches won
269	(Serbia) **Novak Djokovic**
224	(Switzerland) Roger Federer
186	(Spain) Rafael Nadal
166	(Czechoslovakia) Ivan Lendl
131	(United States) Jimmy Connors
128	(United States) John McEnroe
124	(United States) Pete Sampras
121	(Germany) Boris Becker
113	(Sweden) Björn Borg
109	(United States) Andre Agassi

#	Matches played
391	(Serbia) **Novak Djokovic**
347	(Switzerland) Roger Federer
290	(Spain) Rafael Nadal
258	(Czechoslovakia) Ivan Lendl
241	(United States) Jimmy Connors
222	(United States) John McEnroe
212	(Sweden) Stefan Edberg
201	(United Kingdom) Andy Murray
199	(United States) Andre Agassi
195	(United States) Pete Sampras

%	W–L	Match record
71.07	113–46	(Sweden) Björn Borg
68.80	269–122	(Serbia) **Novak Djokovic**
65.05	121–65	(Germany) Boris Becker
64.55	224–123	(Switzerland) Roger Federer
64.34	166–92	(Czechoslovakia) Ivan Lendl
63.92	186–105	(Spain) Rafael Nadal
63.59	124–71	(United States) Pete Sampras
57.66	128–94	(United States) John McEnroe
54.77	109–90	(United States) Andre Agassi
54.36	131–110	(United States) Jimmy Connors
minimum 100 wins

#	In a season	Year
31	(Serbia) **Novak Djokovic**	2015
24	(United States) John McEnroe	1984
24	(Serbia) **Novak Djokovic** (2)	2012
24	(Spain) Rafael Nadal	2013
24	(Serbia) **Novak Djokovic** (3)	2013
22	(Czechoslovakia) Ivan Lendl	1985
21	(Sweden) Björn Borg	1978
21	(Serbia) **Novak Djokovic** (4)	2011
21	(Serbia) **Novak Djokovic** (5)	2016
20	(Sweden) Björn Borg	1979

=== Season totals ===
#	Titles	Year
18	(Australia) Rod Laver	1969
16	(Romania) Ilie Năstase	1973
16	(Argentina) Guillermo Vilas	1977
15	(Australia) Rod Laver	1970
15	(United States) Jimmy Connors	1974
15	(Czechoslovakia) Ivan Lendl	1982
13	(Sweden) Björn Borg	1979
13	(United States) John McEnroe	1984
12	(Romania) Ilie Năstase (2)	1972
12	(United States) Jimmy Connors (2)	1976
12	(Sweden) Björn Borg (2)	1977
12	(Austria) Thomas Muster	1995
12	(Switzerland) Roger Federer	2006

#	Match wins	Year
134	(Argentina) Guillermo Vilas	1977
125	(Romania) Ilie Năstase	1973
120	(Romania) Ilie Năstase (2)	1972
110	(Czechoslovakia) Ivan Lendl	1980
109	(United States) Brian Gottfried	1977
106	(Czechoslovakia) Ivan Lendl (2)	1982
102	(United States) Arthur Ashe	1975
97	(Australia) Rod Laver	1969
97	(United States) Jimmy Connors	1976
96	(United States) John McEnroe	1979
96	(Czechoslovakia) Ivan Lendl (3)	1981

%	W–L	Match record	Year
96.47	82–3	(United States) John McEnroe	1984
95.92	94–4	(United States) Jimmy Connors	1974
95.29	81–4	(Switzerland) Roger Federer	2005
94.85	92–5	(Switzerland) Roger Federer	2006
93.33	84–6	(Sweden) Björn Borg	1979
93.18	82–6	(Serbia) **Novak Djokovic**	2015
92.50	74–6	(Czechoslovakia) Ivan Lendl	1986
92.50	74–6	(Switzerland) Roger Federer	2004
92.41	73–6	(Italy) **Jannik Sinner**	2024
92.31	84–7	(Czechoslovakia) Ivan Lendl	1985
minimum 70 wins

=== Tournament totals ===
- Grand Slam tournaments in **bold**.

#	Titles	Tournament	First–last
14	(Spain) Rafael Nadal	**French Open**	2005–22
12	(Spain) Rafael Nadal (2)	Barcelona	2005–21
11	(Spain) Rafael Nadal (3)	Monte-Carlo	2005–18
10	(Switzerland) Roger Federer (2)	Halle	2003–19
10	(Switzerland) Roger Federer (2)	Basel	2006–19
10	(Spain) Rafael Nadal (4)	Rome	2005–21
10	(Serbia) **Novak Djokovic**	**Australian Open**	2008–23
8	(Argentina) Guillermo Vilas	Buenos Aires	1973–82
8	(Switzerland) Roger Federer (4)	**Wimbledon**	2003–17
8	(Switzerland) Roger Federer (4)	Dubai	2003–19
7	(United States) Pete Sampras	**Wimbledon**	1993–2000
7	(Switzerland) Roger Federer (5)	Cincinnati	2005–15
7	(Serbia) **Novak Djokovic** (5)	**Wimbledon**	2011–22
7	(Serbia) **Novak Djokovic** (5)	Paris	2009–23
7	(Serbia) **Novak Djokovic** (5)	ATP Finals	2008–23
7	(Serbia) **Novak Djokovic** (5)	Beijing	2009–26
6	(United States) Jimmy Connors	Birmingham	1974–80
6	(Sweden) Björn Borg	**French Open**	1974–81
6	(Hungary) Balázs Taróczy	Hilversum	1976–82
6	(Czechoslovakia) Ivan Lendl	Canada	1980–89
6	(United States) Andre Agassi	Miami	1990–2003
6	(Switzerland) Roger Federer (7)	**Australian Open**	2004–18
6	(Switzerland) Roger Federer (7)	ATP Finals	2003–11
6	(Serbia) **Novak Djokovic** (7)	Miami	2007–16
6	(Serbia) **Novak Djokovic** (7)	Rome	2008–22
6	(United States) John Isner	Atlanta	2013–21

#	Finals	Tournament	First–last
15	(Switzerland) Roger Federer	Basel	2000–19
14	(Spain) Rafael Nadal	**French Open**	2005–22
13	(Switzerland) Roger Federer (2)	Halle	2003–19
12	(Spain) Rafael Nadal (4)	Monte-Carlo	2005–18
12	(Spain) Rafael Nadal (4)	Barcelona	2005–21
12	(Spain) Rafael Nadal (4)	Rome	2005–21
12	(Switzerland) Roger Federer (3)	**Wimbledon**	2003–19
12	(Serbia) **Novak Djokovic**	Rome	2008–22
11	(Serbia) **Novak Djokovic** (2)	**Australian Open**	2008–26
10	(Argentina) Guillermo Vilas	Buenos Aires	1972–82
10	(Switzerland) Roger Federer (5)	ATP Finals	2003–15
10	(Switzerland) Roger Federer (5)	Dubai	2003–19
10	(Serbia) **Novak Djokovic** (4)	**US Open**	2007–23
10	(Serbia) **Novak Djokovic** (4)	**Wimbledon**	2011–24
9	(Czechoslovakia) Ivan Lendl (2)	ATP Finals	1980–88
9	(Czechoslovakia) Ivan Lendl (2)	Canada	1980–92
9	(Switzerland) Roger Federer (6)	Indian Wells	2004–19
9	(Serbia) **Novak Djokovic** (6)	Paris	2009–23
9	(Serbia) **Novak Djokovic** (6)	ATP Finals	2008–23
9	(United States) John Isner	Atlanta	2010–21
8	(United States) John McEnroe	WCT Finals	1979–89
8	(Czechoslovakia) Ivan Lendl (3)	**US Open**	1982–89
8	(Germany) Boris Becker	ATP Finals	1985–96
8	(United States) Pete Sampras	**US Open**	1990–2002
8	(United States) Andre Agassi (2)	Miami	1990–2003
8	(United States) Andre Agassi (2)	San Jose	1990–2003
8	(Spain) Rafael Nadal (5)	Madrid	2005–17
8	(Switzerland) Roger Federer (7)	Cincinnati	2005–18
8	(Serbia) **Novak Djokovic** (8)	Cincinnati	2008–23
8	(Serbia) **Novak Djokovic** (8)	Miami	2007–25

=== Winning streaks ===
▲ indicates an active streak

#	Titles	Years
10	(Sweden) Björn Borg	1979–80
8	(Czechoslovakia) Ivan Lendl	1981–82
8	(United States) John McEnroe	1984–85
7	(Australia) Rod Laver	1969
7	(United States) Jimmy Connors	1974
7	(United States) John McEnroe (2)	1983–84
7	(Argentina) Guillermo Vilas	1977
7	(Switzerland) Roger Federer	2006–07
7	(Serbia) **Novak Djokovic**	2011
7	(Serbia) **Novak Djokovic** (2)	2015–16
6	(Sweden) Björn Borg (2)	1977
6	(Austria) Thomas Muster	1995

#	Finals	Years
18	(Czechoslovakia) Ivan Lendl	1981–82
17	(Switzerland) Roger Federer	2005–06
17	(Serbia) **Novak Djokovic**	2015–16
13	(Argentina) Guillermo Vilas	1977
13	(Sweden) Björn Borg	1979–80
11	(United States) John McEnroe	1983–84
10	(United States) Jimmy Connors	1974
9	(Romania) Ilie Năstase	1973
9	(Spain) Rafael Nadal	2013
9	(Spain) **Carlos Alcaraz**	2025

#	Matches	Years
49	(Sweden) Björn Borg (Note: Borg withdrew prior to a scheduled match in the midst of both streaks, which the ITF does not consider as ending the streak. Likewise, a 1980 news article considered them valid streaks, but Sports Illustrated lists Borg's win streaks at 35 and 41.)	1978
48	(Sweden) Björn Borg (2)	1979–80
46	(Argentina) Guillermo Vilas	1977
44	(Czechoslovakia) Ivan Lendl	1981–82
43	(Serbia) **Novak Djokovic**	2010–11
42	(United States) John McEnroe	1984
41	(Switzerland) Roger Federer	2006–07
36	(United States) Jimmy Connors	1975
35	(United States) Jimmy Connors (2)	1974
35	(Austria) Thomas Muster	1995
35	(Switzerland) Roger Federer (2)	2005

#	vs. Top 10	Years
24	(Switzerland) Roger Federer	2003–05
17	(Switzerland) Roger Federer (2)	2006–07
17	(Serbia) **Novak Djokovic**	2015–16
16	(Sweden) Björn Borg	1978
15	(Sweden) Björn Borg (2)	1979–80
14	(Serbia) **Novak Djokovic** (2)	2012–13
14	(Spain) Rafael Nadal	2012–13
14	(Serbia) **Novak Djokovic** (3)	2018
13	(United States) John McEnroe	1983–84
13	(Spain) Rafael Nadal (2)	2005–06
13	(Serbia) **Novak Djokovic** (4)	2011
13	(Spain) Rafael Nadal (3)	2013
13	(Serbia) **Novak Djokovic** (5)	2013

Winning streaks per court type

#	Hard	Years
56	(Switzerland) Roger Federer	2005–06
47	(United States) Jimmy Connors	1974–75
36	(Switzerland) Roger Federer	2006–07
35	(Serbia) **Novak Djokovic**	2010–11
34	(United States) Pete Sampras	1994
34	(United States) Pete Sampras	1996–97

#	Clay	Years
81	(Spain) Rafael Nadal	2005–07
53	(Argentina) Guillermo Vilas	1977
48	(Sweden) Björn Borg	1977–79
40	(Austria) Thomas Muster	1995
38	(Romania) Ilie Năstase	1973
38	(Austria) Thomas Muster	1995–96

#	Grass	Years
65	(Switzerland) Roger Federer	2003–08
41	(Sweden) Björn Borg	1976–81
34	(Serbia) **Novak Djokovic**	2018–23
24	(Australia) Rod Laver	1969–70
23	(United States) John McEnroe	1980–82
23	(United States) Pete Sampras	1994–96
23	(United States) Pete Sampras	1998–00

#	Carpet (Note: Carpet courts are no longer in use on the professional tour since 2009.)	Years
65	(United States) John McEnroe	1983–85
51	(Czechoslovakia) Ivan Lendl	1981–83
30	(United States) Jimmy Connors	1974–75
30	(Czechoslovakia) Ivan Lendl	1985–86
27	(United States) Arthur Ashe	1975

#	Outdoor	Years
51	(Sweden) Björn Borg	1977–78
46	(Argentina) Guillermo Vilas	1977
43	(Serbia) **Novak Djokovic**	2010–11
42	(Switzerland) Roger Federer	2005–06
39	(United States) Pete Sampras	1994

#	Indoor	Years
66	(Czech Republic) Ivan Lendl	1981–83
53	(United States) John McEnroe	1983–84
38	(Serbia) **Novak Djokovic**	2012–15
35	(Czech Republic) Ivan Lendl	1985–86
33	(United States) Jimmy Connors	1974–75

=== Court type totals ===
Active surface	Defunct surface

Match stats correct (as of 2026 Rolex Paris Masters).

==== Titles ====
#	Hard
73	(Serbia) **Novak Djokovic**
71	(Switzerland) Roger Federer
46	(United States) Andre Agassi
43	(United States) Jimmy Connors
35	(United States) Pete Sampras
34	(United Kingdom) Andy Murray
31	(Czechoslovakia) Ivan Lendl
25	(Australia) Rod Laver
25	(Spain) Rafael Nadal
23	(Italy) **Jannik Sinner**
23	**Daniil Medvedev**

#	Clay
63	(Spain) Rafael Nadal
49	(Argentina) Guillermo Vilas
40	(Austria) Thomas Muster
32	(Sweden) Björn Borg
31	(Romania) Ilie Năstase
31	(Spain) Manuel Orantes
28	(Czechoslovakia) Ivan Lendl
21	(Argentina) José Luis Clerc
21	(Serbia) **Novak Djokovic**
20	(Sweden) Mats Wilander

#	Grass
19	(Switzerland) Roger Federer
10	(United States) Pete Sampras
9	(United States) Stan Smith
9	(United States) Jimmy Connors
8	(Australia) Rod Laver
8	(Australia) Ken Rosewall
8	(Soviet Union) Alex Metreveli
8	(United States) John McEnroe
8	(Australia) Lleyton Hewitt
8	(United Kingdom) Andy Murray
8	(Serbia) **Novak Djokovic**

#	Carpet
45	(United States) Jimmy Connors
43	(United States) John McEnroe
32	(Czechoslovakia) Ivan Lendl
26	(Germany) Boris Becker
23	(Australia) Rod Laver
22	(Sweden) Björn Borg
22	(United States) Arthur Ashe
19	(United States) Stan Smith
19	(Romania) Ilie Năstase
16	(United States) Pete Sampras

#	Outdoor
90	(Spain) Rafael Nadal
82	(Serbia) **Novak Djokovic**
77	(Switzerland) Roger Federer
56	(United States) Jimmy Connors
53	(Argentina) Guillermo Vilas
52	(Czechoslovakia) Ivan Lendl
48	(United States) Andre Agassi
44	(Australia) Rod Laver
43	(Austria) Thomas Muster
42	(Sweden) Björn Borg

#	Indoor
53	(United States) Jimmy Connors
52	(United States) John McEnroe
42	(Czechoslovakia) Ivan Lendl
30	(Germany) Boris Becker
28	(Australia) Rod Laver
26	(Romania) Ilie Năstase
26	(United States) Stan Smith
26	(Switzerland) Roger Federer
25	(United States) Arthur Ashe
24	(Sweden) Björn Borg

==== Match record ====
%	W–L	Hard
83.95	748–143	(Serbia) **Novak Djokovic**
83.48	783–155	(Switzerland) Roger Federer
83.16	489–99	(United States) Jimmy Connors
82.61	399–84	(Czechoslovakia) Ivan Lendl
82.00	246–54	(Italy) **Jannik Sinner**
81.64	289–65	(United States) John McEnroe
80.64	429–103	(United States) Pete Sampras
78.93	592–158	(United States) Andre Agassi
78.44	382–105	(Sweden) Stefan Edberg
77.43	518–151	(Spain) Rafael Nadal
minimum 200 wins

%	W–L	Clay
90.47	484–51	(Spain) Rafael Nadal
86.10	285–46	(Sweden) Björn Borg
84.38	108–20	(Spain) **Carlos Alcaraz**
81.03	329–77	(Czechoslovakia) Ivan Lendl
80.05	297–74	(Serbia) **Novak Djokovic**
79.74	681–173	(Argentina) Guillermo Vilas
78.88	422–113	(Romania) Ilie Năstase
78.82	134–36	(Australia) Ken Rosewall
77.33	307–90	(Argentina) José Luis Clerc
77.08	555–165	(Spain) Manuel Orantes
minimum 100 wins

%	W–L	Grass
86.88	192–29	(Switzerland) Roger Federer
85.82	121–20	(United States) John McEnroe
85.53	130–22	(Serbia) **Novak Djokovic**
84.82	95–17	(Australia) Rod Laver
83.47	101–20	(United States) Pete Sampras
82.96	185–38	(United States) Jimmy Connors
82.27	116–25	(Germany) Boris Becker
81.82	72–16	(Sweden) Björn Borg
81.51	119–27	(Soviet Union) Alex Metreveli
79.87	119–30	(United Kingdom) Andy Murray
minimum 50 wins

%	W–L	Carpet
84.30	349–65	(United States) John McEnroe
82.75	259–54	(Czechoslovakia) Ivan Lendl
82.53	392–83	(United States) Jimmy Connors
81.17	181–42	(Sweden) Björn Borg
80.12	258–64	(Germany) Boris Becker
78.20	208–58	(Australia) Rod Laver
76.88	286–86	(United States) Arthur Ashe
75.94	142–45	(United States) Pete Sampras
73.45	166–60	(Russia) Yevgeny Kafelnikov
71.43	205–82	(United States) Stan Smith
minimum 100 wins

%	W–L	Outdoor
84.33	985–183	(Spain) Rafael Nadal
83.69	980–191	(Serbia) **Novak Djokovic**
83.43	277–55	(Spain) **Carlos Alcaraz**
83.33	430–86	(Sweden) Björn Borg
82.30	953–205	(Switzerland) Roger Federer
81.98	787–173	(United States) Jimmy Connors
80.87	727–172	(Czechoslovakia) Ivan Lendl
80.80	345–82	(Australia) Rod Laver
80.12	274–68	(Italy) **Jannik Sinner**
78.63	460–125	(United States) John McEnroe
minimum 200 wins

%	W–L	Indoor
85.28	423–73	(United States) John McEnroe
82.97	341–70	(Czechoslovakia) Ivan Lendl
81.57	487–110	(United States) Jimmy Connors
80.98	298–70	(Switzerland) Roger Federer
80.58	224–54	(Sweden) Björn Borg
79.84	297–75	(West Germany) Boris Becker
79.69	204–52	(Serbia) **Novak Djokovic**
78.31	231–64	(Australia) Rod Laver
77.74	213–61	(United States) Pete Sampras
74.16	155–54	(United Kingdom) Andy Murray
minimum 100 wins

===== Match wins =====
#	Hard
783	(Switzerland) Roger Federer
748	(Serbia) **Novak Djokovic**
592	(United States) Andre Agassi
518	(Spain) Rafael Nadal
503	(United Kingdom) Andy Murray
489	(United States) Jimmy Connors
429	(United States) Pete Sampras
427	(United States) Andy Roddick
415	(United States) Michael Chang
401	(Czech Republic) Tomáš Berdych

#	Clay
681	(Argentina) Guillermo Vilas
569	(Spain) Manuel Orantes
484	(Spain) Rafael Nadal
426	(Austria) Thomas Muster
422	(Romania) Ilie Năstase
394	(Spain) José Higueras
382	(United States) Eddie Dibbs
337	(Spain) Carlos Moyá
335	(Spain) David Ferrer
329	(Czechoslovakia) Ivan Lendl
329	(Ecuador) Andrés Gómez

#	Grass
192	(Switzerland) Roger Federer
185	(United States) Jimmy Connors
164	(Australia) John Newcombe
157	(Australia) Phil Dent
148	(Australia) John Alexander
145	(Australia) Ken Rosewall
143	(United States) Stan Smith
136	(Australia) Tony Roche
132	(United States) Arthur Ashe
130	(Serbia) **Novak Djokovic**

#	Carpet
392	(United States) Jimmy Connors
349	(United States) John McEnroe
286	(United States) Arthur Ashe
259	(Czechoslovakia) Ivan Lendl
258	(Germany) Boris Becker
223	(Romania) Ilie Năstase
216	(United States) Brian Gottfried
208	(Australia) Rod Laver
205	(United States) Stan Smith
196	(United States) Vitas Gerulaitis

#	Outdoor
985	(Spain) Rafael Nadal
980	(Serbia) **Novak Djokovic**
953	(Switzerland) Roger Federer
814	(Argentina) Guillermo Vilas
787	(United States) Jimmy Connors
727	(Czechoslovakia) Ivan Lendl
702	(United States) Andre Agassi
638	(Spain) Manuel Orantes
628	(Spain) David Ferrer
584	(Romania) Ilie Năstase
584	(United Kingdom) Andy Murray

#	Indoor
487	(United States) Jimmy Connors
423	(United States) John McEnroe
341	(Czechoslovakia) Ivan Lendl
339	(United States) Arthur Ashe
309	(Romania) Ilie Năstase
307	(United States) Brian Gottfried
303	(United States) Stan Smith
298	(Switzerland) Roger Federer
297	(Germany) Boris Becker
257	(Sweden) Stefan Edberg

=== Titles per season ===
1+ title	Years	
(Serbia) **Novak Djokovic**	21	2006–26
(Spain) Rafael Nadal	19	2004–22
(United States) Andre Agassi	18	1987–05
(Switzerland) Roger Federer	18	2001–19
(United States) Jimmy Connors	15	1972–89
(Czechoslovakia) Ivan Lendl	14	1980–93
(United Kingdom) Andy Murray	13	2006–19
(United States) John McEnroe	13	1978–91
(Sweden) Stefan Edberg	12	1984–95
(Germany) Boris Becker	12	1985–96
(United States) Andy Roddick	12	2001–12
(United States) Pete Sampras	12	1990–02
(United States) Michael Chang	12	1988–00

5+ titles	Years	
(Serbia) **Novak Djokovic**	12	2007–23
(United States) Jimmy Connors	11	1972–84
(Switzerland) Roger Federer	10	2003–17
(Czechoslovakia) Ivan Lendl	9	1980–90
(Spain) Rafael Nadal	9	2005–18
(Australia) Rod Laver	8	1968–75
(United States) John McEnroe	8	1978–85
(Sweden) Björn Borg	7	1974–80
(United States) Pete Sampras	7	1992–99
(Romania) Ilie Năstase	6	1971–76
(Argentina) Guillermo Vilas	6	1974–82
(Germany) Boris Becker	6	1986–96
(United States) Andre Agassi	6	1988–2002

10+ titles	Years	
(United States) Jimmy Connors	4	1973–74, 76, 78
(Czechoslovakia) Ivan Lendl	4	1981–82, 85, 89
(Australia) Rod Laver	3	1968–70
(United States) John McEnroe	3	1979, 81, 84
(Switzerland) Roger Federer	3	2004–06
(Romania) Ilie Năstase	2	1972–73
(Sweden) Björn Borg	2	1977, 79
(Spain) Rafael Nadal	2	2005, 13
(Serbia) **Novak Djokovic**	2	2011, 15
(Argentina) Guillermo Vilas	1	1977
(Austria) Thomas Muster	1	1995
(United States) Pete Sampras	1	1994

==== Per consecutive seasons ====
1+ title	Cons. years	
(Serbia) **Novak Djokovic**	21	**2006–26**^{▲}
(Spain) Rafael Nadal	19	2004–22
(Switzerland) Roger Federer	15	2001–15
(Czechoslovakia) Ivan Lendl	14	1980–93
(United States) Jimmy Connors	13	1972–84
(Sweden) Stefan Edberg	12	1984–95
(Germany) Boris Becker	12	1985–96
(United States) Andy Roddick	12	2001–12
(United Kingdom) Andy Murray	12	2006–17
(Argentina) Guillermo Vilas	11	1973–83
(United States) Pete Sampras	11	1990–00

2+ titles	Cons. years	
(Spain) Rafael Nadal	18	2005–22
(Serbia) **Novak Djokovic**	18	2006–23
(United States) Jimmy Connors	13	1972–84
(Czechoslovakia) Ivan Lendl	12	1980–91
(Germany) Boris Becker	12	1985–96
(United States) Pete Sampras	11	1990–00
(Switzerland) Roger Federer	11	2002–12
(United Kingdom) Andy Murray	10	2007–16
(Argentina) Guillermo Vilas	10	1974–83
(Sweden) Stefan Edberg	9	1984–92

1+ final	Cons. years	
(Serbia) **Novak Djokovic**	21	**2006–26**^{▲}
(Switzerland) Roger Federer	20	2000–19
(United States) Jimmy Connors	19	1971–89
(Spain) Rafael Nadal	19	2004–22
(France) Gaël Monfils	19	2005–23
(Czechoslovakia) / (United States) Ivan Lendl	16	1979–94
(Spain) Manuel Orantes	15	1969–83
(United States) John McEnroe	14	1978–91
(Spain) Carlos Moyá	14	1995–08
(Czech Republic) Tomáš Berdych	14	2004–17

== Big Titles ==
(1990–present) The Grand Slam tournaments, the Masters events and the ATP Finals are the Big Titles of the annual ATP Tour calendar, in addition to the quadrennial Summer Olympics. Between 1970 and 1989, the biggest titles were the four majors, Davis Cup, and the Year-end Championships (ATP Finals and WCT Finals), in addition to the Grand Prix Super Series events.

=== ATP Tour totals ===
- Players with minimum 10 big titles. Active players and records in bold.

Titles	Player	Majors	ATP 1000	Year-end	Olympics
72	(Serbia) **Novak Djokovic**	**24**	**40**	**7**	1
59	(Spain) Rafael Nadal	22	36	—	1
54	(Switzerland) Roger Federer	20	28	6	—
30	(United States) Pete Sampras	14	11	5	—
27	(United States) Andre Agassi	8	17	1	1
20	(United Kingdom) Andy Murray	3	14	1	**2**
17	(Italy) **Jannik Sinner**	5	10	2	—
17	(Spain) **Carlos Alcaraz**	7	9	1	—
12	(Germany) **Alexander Zverev**	2	7	2	1

=== Big Titles Sweep ===
BTS	Player	Event of completion
BTS	(Serbia) **Novak Djokovic**	2024 Olympic Games
BTS	All Big Titles throughout player's career	

== Olympic tournaments ==
Tennis was reinstated as an official Olympic sport in 1988. There have been ten tournaments in the Open Era.

Multiple medalists	Medals
(United Kingdom) Andy Murray †	Tennis at the 2012 Summer Olympics – Men's singles Tennis at the 2016 Summer Olympics – Men's singles
(Serbia) **Novak Djokovic** ††	Tennis at the 2024 Summer Olympics – Men's singles Tennis at the 2008 Summer Olympics – Men's singles
(Chile) Fernando González	Tennis at the 2008 Summer Olympics – Men's singles Tennis at the 2004 Summer Olympics – Men's singles
(Argentina) Juan Martín del Potro	Tennis at the 2016 Summer Olympics – Men's singles Tennis at the 2012 Summer Olympics – Men's singles
† Consecutive Gold medals
†† Gold medal dropping no sets

#	Matches won
19	(Serbia) **Novak Djokovic**
13	(Switzerland) Roger Federer
12	(United Kingdom) Andy Murray
11	(Japan) Kei Nishikori
11	(Spain) Rafael Nadal
10	(Chile) Fernando González
10	(Argentina) Juan Martín del Potro
9	(Germany) **Alexander Zverev**
8	(Switzerland) Marc Rosset
8	(Chile) Nicolás Massú
Top 10

%	W–L	Match record
92.3	12–1	(United Kingdom) Andy Murray
90.0	9–1	(Germany) **Alexander Zverev**
88.9	8–1	(Switzerland) Marc Rosset
83.3	10–2	(Chile) Fernando González
83.3	10–2	(Argentina) Juan Martín del Potro
80.0	8–2	(Chile) Nicolás Massú
78.6	11–3	(Spain) Rafael Nadal
76.0	19–6	(Serbia) **Novak Djokovic**
75.0	6–2	(Spain) Sergi Bruguera
75.0	6–2	(Germany) Tommy Haas
Top 10 (minimum 2 tournaments)

#	Appearances
5	(Chinese Taipei) Lu Yen-hsun
5	(Serbia) **Novak Djokovic**
5	(Japan) Kei Nishikori
4	(Croatia) Goran Ivanišević
4	(Romania) Andrei Pavel
4	(Switzerland) Roger Federer
4	(Croatia) **Marin Čilić**
4	(France) Gilles Simon
4	(France) Gaël Monfils

== ATP rankings achievements ==
ATP rankings began in 1973. These weekly rankings determine tournament eligibility and seedings. At the end of each year they also become the official ATP season rankings.

=== Rankings weeks ===
- The ATP ranking was frozen for 22 weeks from 23 March to 23 August 2020.

Correct as of 2 November 2026 with (▲) indicating active streaks.

#	No. 1
428	(Serbia) **Novak Djokovic**
310	(Switzerland) Roger Federer
286	(United States) Pete Sampras
270	(Czechoslovakia) Ivan Lendl
268	(United States) Jimmy Connors

#	Top 2
599	(Serbia) **Novak Djokovic**
596	(Spain) Rafael Nadal
528	(Switzerland) Roger Federer
387	(United States) Jimmy Connors
376	(Czechoslovakia) Ivan Lendl
376	(United States) Pete Sampras

#	Top 3
764	(Serbia) **Novak Djokovic**
750	(Switzerland) Roger Federer
686	(Spain) Rafael Nadal
592	(United States) Jimmy Connors
499	(Czechoslovakia) Ivan Lendl

#	Top 4
829	(Serbia) **Novak Djokovic**
804	(Switzerland) Roger Federer
756	(Spain) Rafael Nadal
669	(United States) Jimmy Connors
540	(Czechoslovakia) Ivan Lendl

#	Top 5
873	(Serbia) **Novak Djokovic**
859	(Switzerland) Roger Federer
837	(Spain) Rafael Nadal
705	(United States) Jimmy Connors
563	(Czechoslovakia) Ivan Lendl

#	Top 10
968	(Switzerland) Roger Federer
961	(Serbia) **Novak Djokovic**
912	(Spain) Rafael Nadal
817	(United States) Jimmy Connors
747	(United States) Andre Agassi

Consecutive weeks

#	Cons. No. 1	Years
237	(Switzerland) Roger Federer	2004–08
160	(United States) Jimmy Connors	1974–77
157	(Czechoslovakia) Ivan Lendl	1985–88
122	(Serbia) **Novak Djokovic**	2014–16
102	(United States) Pete Sampras	1996–98

#	Cons. top 2
346	(Switzerland) Roger Federer
325	(Serbia) **Novak Djokovic**
282	(United States) Jimmy Connors
280	(Czechoslovakia) Ivan Lendl
212	(Spain) Rafael Nadal

#	Cons. top 3
465	(Czechoslovakia) Ivan Lendl
432	(Switzerland) Roger Federer
399	(Serbia) **Novak Djokovic**
391	(United States) Pete Sampras
377	(United States) Jimmy Connors

#	Cons. top 4
651	(United States) Jimmy Connors
525	(Serbia) **Novak Djokovic**
523	(Czechoslovakia) Ivan Lendl
522	(Switzerland) Roger Federer
403	(United States) Pete Sampras

#	Cons. top 5
659	(United States) Jimmy Connors
558	(Czechoslovakia) Ivan Lendl
548	(Switzerland) Roger Federer
535	(Serbia) **Novak Djokovic**
522	(Spain) Rafael Nadal

#	Cons. top 10
912	(Spain) Rafael Nadal
788	(United States) Jimmy Connors
734	(Switzerland) Roger Federer
619	(Czechoslovakia) Ivan Lendl
565	(United States) Pete Sampras

=== Year-end rankings ===
#	No. 1
8	(Serbia) **Novak Djokovic**
6	(United States) Pete Sampras
5	(United States) Jimmy Connors
5	(Switzerland) Roger Federer
5	(Spain) Rafael Nadal

#	Top 2
13	(Spain) Rafael Nadal
11	(Switzerland) Roger Federer
11	(Serbia) **Novak Djokovic**
8	(United States) Jimmy Connors
7	(Czechoslovakia) Ivan Lendl

#	Top 3
15	(Switzerland) Roger Federer
15	(Serbia) **Novak Djokovic**
14	(Spain) Rafael Nadal
12	(United States) Jimmy Connors
10	(Czechoslovakia) Ivan Lendl

#	Top 4
16	(Serbia) **Novak Djokovic**
15	(Switzerland) Roger Federer
15	(Spain) Rafael Nadal
14	(United States) Jimmy Connors
10	(Czechoslovakia) Ivan Lendl

#	Top 5
17	(Serbia) **Novak Djokovic**
16	(Switzerland) Roger Federer
16	(Spain) Rafael Nadal
14	(United States) Jimmy Connors
11	(Czechoslovakia) Ivan Lendl

#	Top 10
18	(Switzerland) Roger Federer
18	(Spain) Rafael Nadal
18	(Serbia) **Novak Djokovic**
16	(United States) Jimmy Connors
16	(United States) Andre Agassi

Consecutive years

#	Cons. No. 1	Years
6	(United States) Pete Sampras	1993–98
5	(United States) Jimmy Connors	1974–78
4	(United States) John McEnroe	1981–84
4	(Switzerland) Roger Federer	2004–07
3	(Czechoslovakia) Ivan Lendl	1985–87

#	Cons. Top 2
8	(Switzerland) Roger Federer
7	(Spain) Rafael Nadal
6	(United States) Jimmy Connors
6	(United States) John McEnroe
6	(United States) Pete Sampras
6	(Serbia) **Novak Djokovic**

#	Cons. Top 3
12	(United States) Jimmy Connors
10	(Czechoslovakia) Ivan Lendl
10	(Switzerland) Roger Federer
10	(Serbia) **Novak Djokovic**
9	(United States) Pete Sampras

#	Cons. Top 4
13	(United States) Jimmy Connors
10	(Czechoslovakia) Ivan Lendl
10	(Switzerland) Roger Federer
10	(Spain) Rafael Nadal
10	(Serbia) **Novak Djokovic**
9	(United States) Pete Sampras

#	Cons. Top 5
13	(United States) Jimmy Connors
11	(Czechoslovakia) Ivan Lendl
11	(Spain) Rafael Nadal
10	(Switzerland) Roger Federer
10	(Serbia) **Novak Djokovic**

#	Cons. Top 10
18	(Spain) Rafael Nadal
16	(United States) Jimmy Connors
14	(Switzerland) Roger Federer
13	(Czechoslovakia) Ivan Lendl
12	(United States) Pete Sampras

== Prize money ==
Prize money has increased throughout the Open Era, in some cases greatly in a short time span. For example, the Australian Open winner received A$3,400 in 1970, A$103,875 in 1987, A$916,000 in 2004, and A$4,150,000 in 2026.

- Career totals include doubles prize money and are not inflation-adjusted.

Prize money	Career	Ending
$197,006,276	(Serbia) **Novak Djokovic**	Active
$134,946,100	(Spain) Rafael Nadal	2024
$130,594,339	(Switzerland) Roger Federer	2022
$76,079,552	(Germany) **Alexander Zverev**	Active
$70,675,661	(Italy) **Jannik Sinner**	Active
$69,137,608	(Spain) **Carlos Alcaraz**	Active
$64,687,542	(United Kingdom) Andy Murray	2024
$55,060,133	(Russia) **Daniil Medvedev**	Active
$43,280,489	(United States) Pete Sampras	2002
$39,841,492	(Greece) **Stefanos Tsitsipas**	Active

Prize money	Single season	Year
$21,646,145	(Serbia) **Novak Djokovic**	2015
$21,354,778	(Spain) **Carlos Alcaraz**	2025
$19,735,703	(Italy) **Jannik Sinner**	2024
$19,120,641	(Italy) **Jannik Sinner**	2025
$16,349,701	(United Kingdom) Andy Murray	2016
$16,349,586	(Spain) Rafael Nadal	2019
$15,967,184	(Serbia) **Novak Djokovic**	2018
$15,952,044	(Serbia) **Novak Djokovic**	2023
$15,864,000	(Spain) Rafael Nadal	2017
$15,401,939	(Germany) **Alexander Zverev**	2026

- Correct as of 9 November 2026.

== Miscellaneous ==
=== Youngest and oldest ===
==== All tournaments ====
Age at first title		Event
16y 2 m	(United States) Aaron Krickstein	1983 Tel Aviv
16y 7 m	(United States) Michael Chang	1988 San Francisco
16y 10 m	(Australia) Lleyton Hewitt	1998 Adelaide
17y 6 m	(Germany) Boris Becker	1985 Queen's Club
17y 6 m	(Argentina) Guillermo Pérez Roldán	1987 Munich
17y 6 m	(United States) Andre Agassi	1987 Itaparica
17y 7 m	(Sweden) Björn Borg	1974 Auckland
17y 7 m	(Australia) Pat Cash	1983 Melbourne
17y 9 m	(Sweden) Mats Wilander	**1982 French Open**
17y 9 m	(Ukraine) Andriy Medvedev	1992 Genoa

Age at last title		Event
44y 7 m	(United States) Pancho Gonzales	1972 Kingston
43y 0 m	(Australia) Ken Rosewall	1977 Tokyo
39y 4 m	(Serbia) **Novak Djokovic**	2026 Beijing
38y 4 m	(France) Gaël Monfils	2025 Auckland
38y 2 m	(Switzerland) Roger Federer	2019 Basel
37y 9 m	(Spain) Feliciano López	2019 Queen's Club
37y 8 m	(United States) Marty Riessen	1979 Lafayette
37y 5 m	(Australia) Rod Laver	1976 Detroit
37y 5 m	(Croatia) Ivo Karlović	2016 Los Cabos
37y 1 m	(United States) Jimmy Connors	1989 Tel Aviv

==== Grand Slam tournaments ====
Youngest winner		Event
17y 3 m	(United States) Michael Chang	1989 French Open
17y 7 m	(West Germany) Boris Becker	1985 Wimbledon
17y 9 m	(Sweden) Mats Wilander	1982 French Open
18y 0 m	(Sweden) Björn Borg	1974 French Open
18y 7 m	(West Germany) Boris Becker	1986 Wimbledon

Oldest winner		Event
37y 2 m	(Australia) Ken Rosewall	1972 Australian Open
36y 5 m	(Switzerland) Roger Federer	2018 Australian Open
36y 4 m	(Australia) Ken Rosewall	1971 Australian Open
36y 3 m	(Serbia) **Novak Djokovic**	2023 US Open
36y 0 m	(Serbia) **Novak Djokovic**	2023 French Open

Youngest finalist		Event
17y 3 m	(United States) Michael Chang	1989 French Open
17y 7 m	(West Germany) Boris Becker	1985 Wimbledon
17y 9 m	(Sweden) Mats Wilander	1982 French Open
18y 0 m	(Sweden) Björn Borg	1974 French Open
18y 7 m	(West Germany) Boris Becker	1986 Wimbledon

Oldest finalist		Event
39y 10 m	(Australia) Ken Rosewall	1974 US Open
39y 8 m	(Australia) Ken Rosewall	1974 Wimbledon
38y 8 m	(Serbia) **Novak Djokovic**	2026 Australian Open
37y 11 m	(Switzerland) Roger Federer	2019 Wimbledon
37y 2 m	(Australia) Ken Rosewall	1972 Australian Open

==== No. 1 & Top 10 ====
Youngest	No. 1	19 years, 130 days	(Spain) **Carlos Alcaraz**	2022
Youngest	Year-end No. 1	19 years, 240 days	(Spain) **Carlos Alcaraz**	2022
Youngest	Top 10	17 years, 11 days	(United States) Aaron Krickstein	1984
Youngest	Year-end Top 10	17 years, 312 days	(United States) Michael Chang	1989
Oldest	No. 1	37 years, 18 days	(Serbia) **Novak Djokovic**	2024
Oldest	Year-end No. 1	36 years, 223 days	(Serbia) **Novak Djokovic**	2023
Oldest	Top 10	41 years, 267 days	(Australia) Ken Rosewall	1976
Oldest	Year-end Top 10	41 years, 59 days	(Australia) Ken Rosewall	1975

=== Win percentage ===
- minimum 25 matches (M/Y is average number of matches per year during the streak)

90%+	Years		M/Y
(Czechoslovakia) Ivan Lendl	5	1982, 85–87, 89	90.6
(United States) Jimmy Connors	4	1974–76, 78	95.0
(Sweden) Björn Borg	4	1977–80	84.3
(Switzerland) Roger Federer	4	2004–06, 17	80.3
(Italy) **Jannik Sinner**	3	2024–26	63.3
(Serbia) **Novak Djokovic**	2	2011, 15	82.0
(Spain) Rafael Nadal	2	2013, 18	65.5
(Argentina) Guillermo Vilas	1	1977	150
(United States) John McEnroe	1	1984	85.0

80%+	Years		M/Y
(Switzerland) Roger Federer	15	2003–19	77.7
(Spain) Rafael Nadal	15	2005–22	69.5
(Serbia) **Novak Djokovic**	15	2009–24	67.6
(United States) Jimmy Connors	13	1973–88	95.0
(United States) John McEnroe	10	1978–89	79.9
(Czechoslovakia) Ivan Lendl	9	1981–90	85.4
(Sweden) Björn Borg	7	1975–81	79.6
(Australia) Rod Laver	6	1969–75	87.0
(Argentina) Guillermo Vilas	6	1974–82	105.5
(United States) Pete Sampras	6	1993–99	78.2

==== Consecutive ====
90%+	Years		M/Y
(Sweden) Björn Borg	4	1977–80	84.3
(United States) Jimmy Connors	3	1974–76	95.0
(Czechoslovakia) Ivan Lendl	3	1985–87	84.0
(Switzerland) Roger Federer	3	2004–06	87.3
(Italy) **Jannik Sinner**	3	**2024–26^{▲}**	63.3

80%+	Years		M/Y
(Serbia) **Novak Djokovic**	14	2011–24	65.5
(United States) Jimmy Connors	12	1973–84	85.5
(Switzerland) Roger Federer	10	2003–12	82.5
(Spain) Rafael Nadal	10	2005–14	77.2
(United States) John McEnroe	9	1978–86	82.3
(Sweden) Björn Borg	7	1975–81	79.6
(Czechoslovakia) Ivan Lendl	6	1985–90	75.5

=== Sets statistics ===
==== Set and game winning percentages ====
Correct as of 2026 Rolex Paris Masters.

%	W–L	Set record
76.9	2586–777	(Spain) Rafael Nadal
76.4	2845–881	(Serbia) **Novak Djokovic**
75.9	3076–979	(Switzerland) Roger Federer
75.6	2974–961	(United States) Jimmy Connors
75.5	2092–679	(United States) John McEnroe
75.3	1569–514	(Sweden) Björn Borg
75.2	2570–849	(Czechoslovakia) Ivan Lendl
73.2	775–284	(Italy) **Jannik Sinner**
72.4	1385–529	(Australia) Rod Laver
71.0	2139–872	(United States) Andre Agassi
minimum 1,000 sets

%	W–L	Game record
60.08	11494–7638	(Sweden) Björn Borg
59.69	21906–14796	(United States) Jimmy Connors
59.63	18721–12675	(Spain) Rafael Nadal
59.52	15467–10520	(United States) John McEnroe
59.51	18940–12888	(Czechoslovakia) Ivan Lendl
59.26	20754–14270	(Serbia) **Novak Djokovic**
58.06	22749–16431	(Switzerland) Roger Federer
58.04	10840–7836	(Australia) Rod Laver
57.97	16750–12145	(Argentina) Guillermo Vilas
57.69	16231–11902	(United States) Andre Agassi
minimum 10,000 games

==== Consecutive sets won ====
#	All tournaments	Years
44	(United States) Jimmy Connors	1974
43	(Czechoslovakia) Ivan Lendl	1985
39	(United States) Jimmy Connors (2)	1976
39	(Sweden) Björn Borg	1980
37	(United States) John McEnroe	1982
35	(United States) John McEnroe (2)	1984
34	(United States) Jimmy Connors (3)	1975
34	(Sweden) Björn Borg (2)	1979
32	(Czechoslovakia) Ivan Lendl (2)	1986
32	(Argentina) Guillermo Coria	2003
32	(Switzerland) Roger Federer	2017

#	Grand Slams	Years
36	(Switzerland) Roger Federer	2006–07
35	(United States) John McEnroe	1984
35	(Spain) Rafael Nadal	2020–21
31	(Italy) **Jannik Sinner**	2025
29	(Spain) Rafael Nadal (2)	2017
29	(Serbia) **Novak Djokovic**	2023
28	(Sweden) Björn Borg	1980
28	(Spain) Rafael Nadal (3)	2010
26	(Sweden) Stefan Edberg	1991–92
25	(Serbia) **Novak Djokovic** (2)	2019

Consecutive sets won per court type

#	Hard	Years
34	(Serbia) **Novak Djokovic**	2016
33	(Switzerland) Roger Federer	2005–06
31	(Switzerland) Roger Federer (2)	2006–07

#	Clay	Years
50	(Spain) Rafael Nadal	2017–18
35	(Argentina) Guillermo Coria	2003–04
34	(Romania) Ilie Năstase	1973

#	Grass	Years
36	(Switzerland) Roger Federer	2003–04
30	(Switzerland) Roger Federer (2)	2017
29	(Switzerland) Roger Federer (3)	2007–08

#	Carpet	Years
49	(United States) John McEnroe	1984
44	(United States) Jimmy Connors	1974
36	(Czechoslovakia) Ivan Lendl	1982–83

== See also ==
- All-time tennis records – Men's singles
- ATP Finals appearances
- ATP Tour records
- List of ATP number 1 ranked singles tennis players
- List of ATP Tour top-level tournament singles champions
- List of Grand Slam men's singles champions
- Lists of tennis records and statistics
- Open Era tennis records – Women's singles
- Tennis Masters Series singles records and statistics
