= WCT Circuit =

Tennis tour

Details
- Duration: 1968–1989
- Edition: 1-18

Achievements (singles)

The WCT Circuit was a tour for professional male tennis players that commenced in 1968 (the organization and first players signed a contract at the end of 1967) it lasted until 1989 when it and ITF Grand Prix Circuit were both replaced by the new ATP Tour in 1990. It was administered by World Championship Tennis. A number of tennis tournaments around the world were affiliated with the WCT and players were ranked in special WCT rankings according to their results in those tournaments.

The season-ending championship for the WCT Circuit was the WCT Finals.

== History ==
The WCT Circuit was one of the two rival professional male tennis circuits started in 1968. In 1970 a rival the other being the ILTF Grand Prix Circuit was founded. It was organized by World Championship Tennis (WCT). In 1977 the circuits name was changed to the WCT World Series of Tennis. In 1978 it was incorporated into ITF Grand Prix Circuit with its events known as the World Series of Tennis. In April 1981 World Championship Tennis withdrew from Grand Prix Circuit. In 1982 it was re-established as an independent circuit until December 1984. In 1985 the circuit was once again incorporated into ITF Grand Prix Circuit until 1988. In 1989 it became an independent circuit once again. In 1990 both it and the Grand Prix Circuit were replaced by a single world wide ATP Tour. with its last three events being absorbed into the 1990 ATP Tour in September that year World Championship Tennis ceased trading.

== Seasons ==
=== WCT 1985 ===
WCT tournaments returned to the Grand Prix stage after a three-year absence during 1982–84. There were only four events. The titles were split between Ivan Lendl and John McEnroe, winning two each. While McEnroe entered into all four, Lendl played just two and won both. McEnroe won the WCT Houston title, beating Kevin Curren in the final.

The WCT Finals in Dallas saw the unexpected defeat of McEnroe in the quarterfinals by Joakim Nyström in three straight sets. The title was captured by Lendl, whose success completed a triplicate of titles in three weeks: Fort Myers on hard, Monte Carlo on clay and Dallas on the carpet. Other players have won three, even four, tournaments in successive weeks in the Open Era, but never on different surfaces.

In Atlanta, McEnroe won the final over Paul Annacone in three sets. The WCT Tournament of Champions in Forest Hills ended with much anticipated final between Lendl and McEnroe. Despite winning only two of his last 12 matches over McEnroe in ATP tournaments, Lendl beat McEnroe 6–3 6–3.

Nabisco Grand Prix
Date	Location	Tournament	Prize Money/ Surface	Final	Semifinals
Mar 3	Houston, USA	WCT Houston Shoot-Out	$300,000; Carpet	(United States) John McEnroe d. (South Africa) Kevin Curren, 7–5, 6–1, 7–6	John McEnroe d. Peter Fleming, 6–4, 6–0; Kevin Curren d. Shahar Perkiss, 6–2, 6–2
April 14	Dallas, USA	Buick WCT Finals	$500,000; Carpet	(United States) Ivan Lendl d. (United States) Tim Mayotte, 7–6, 6–4, 6–1	Ivan Lendl d. Jimmy Connors, 6–3, 2–1 ret. Tim Mayotte d. Joakim Nyström, 6–4, 4–6, 6–2, 7–5
April 28	Atlanta, USA	WCT Atlanta	$300,000; Carpet	(United States) John McEnroe d. (United States) Paul Annacone, 7–6, 7–6, 6–2	John McEnroe d. Mike Leach, 6–3, 6–3; Paul Annacone d. Kevin Curren, walkover
May 12	Forest Hills, USA	Shearson Lehman Brothers Tournament of Champions	$500,000; Clay (Har-Tru)	(United States) Ivan Lendl d. (United States) John McEnroe, 6–3, 6–3	Ivan Lendl d. Aaron Krickstein, 6–1, 2–6, 6–1; John McEnroe d. Henrik Sundström, 6–2, 3–6, 6–2

=== WCT 1986 ===
The WCT Atlanta Championships tournament was marked by early exits of top seeds Stefan Edberg and Boris Becker in the first round. Edberg lost to Mikael Pernfors, and Becker lost to Tim Wilkison. In Dallas, Anders Järryd was the unexpected winner, having replaced the injured Ivan Lendl in the 12-player draw.

Nabisco Grand Prix
Date	Location	Tournament	Prize Money/ Surface	Final	Semifinals
Apr 6	Atlanta, USA	WCT Atlanta	$220,000; Carpet	(United States) Kevin Curren d. (United States) Tim Wilkison, 7–6, 7–6	Kevin Curren d. Brian Teacher, 6–4, 6–2; Tim Wilkison d. David Pate, 6–4, 2–6, 6–4
Apr 13	Dallas, USA	Buick WCT Finals	$500,000; Carpet	(Sweden) Anders Järryd d. (West Germany) Boris Becker, 6–7, 6–1, 6–1, 6–4	Anders Järryd d. Mats Wilander, 6–4, 7–5, 6–3; Boris Becker d. Stefan Edberg 7–6, 7–6, 4–6, 7–6
May 11	Forest Hills, Queens, USA	Shearson Lehman Brothers Tournament of Champions	$500,000; Clay (Har-Tru)	(France) Yannick Noah d. (Argentina) Guillermo Vilas, 7–6, 6–0	Yannick Noah d. Ivan Lendl, 6–3, 7–5; Guillermo Vilas d. Martín Jaite, 6–3, 6–3
Oct 12	Scottsdale, USA	WCT Scottsdale Open	$220,000; Hard	(United States) John McEnroe d. (United States) Kevin Curren, 6–3, 3–6, 6–2	John McEnroe d. David Pate, 6–3, 6–3; Kevin Curren d. Todd Witsken, 7–5, 6–7, 6–4
Nov 23	Houston, USA	WCT Houston Shoot-Out	$220,000; Carpet	(Socialist Federal Republic of Yugoslavia) Slobodan Živojinović d. (United States) Scott Davis, 6–1, 4–6, 6–3	Slobodan Živojinović d. Derrick Rostagno, 6–4, 6–4; Scott Davis d. Eliot Teltscher, 7–5, 6–4

=== WCT 1987 ===
Nabisco Grand Prix
Date	Location	Tournament	Prize Money/ Surface	Final	Semifinals
Apr 12	Dallas, USA	WCT Finals	$500,000; Carpet	(Czechoslovakia) Miloslav Mečíř d. (United States) John McEnroe, 6–0, 3–6, 6–2, 6–2	Miloslav Mečíř d. Andrés Gómez, 6–7, 7–6, 6–4, 6–2; John McEnroe d. Stefan Edberg, 7–6, 6–7, 7–6, 6–4
May 10	Forest Hills, USA	Shearson Lehman Brothers Tournament of Champions	$500,000; Clay (Har-Tru)	(Ecuador) Andrés Gómez d. (France) Yannick Noah, 6–4, 7–6, 7–6	Andrés Gómez d. Boris Becker, 4–6, 6–4, 6–3; Yannick Noah d. Slobodan Živojinović, 6–3, 7–5
Oct 11	Scottsdale, USA	WCT Scottsdale Open	$232,000; Hard	(United States) Brad Gilbert d. (United States) Eliot Teltscher, 6–2, 6–2	Brad Gilbert d. Michael Chang 6–3, 6–4; Eliot Teltscher d. David Pate 7–6, 7–5

=== WCT 1988 ===
Nabisco Grand Prix
Date	Location	Tournament	Prize Money/ Surface	Final	Semifinals
Apr 3	Dallas, USA	WCT Finals	$500,000; Carpet	(West Germany) Boris Becker d. (Sweden) Stefan Edberg, 6–4, 1–6, 7–5, 6–2	Boris Becker d. Brad Gilbert, 6–4, 6–2, 6–1; Stefan Edberg d. Yannick Noah, 6–2, 4–6, 6–3, 6–3
May 8	Forest Hills, USA	Eagle Tournament of Champions	$485,000; Clay (Har-Tru)	(United States) Andre Agassi d. (Socialist Federal Republic of Yugoslavia) Slobodan Živojinović, 7–5, 7–6, 7–5	Andre Agassi d. Aaron Krickstein, 6–3, 6–3; Slobodan Živojinović d. Luiz Mattar, 7–6, 6–3
Oct 9	Scottsdale, USA	WCT Eagle Classic	$297,000; Hard	(Sweden) Mikael Pernfors d. (United States) Glenn Layendecker, 6–2, 6–4	Mikael Pernfors d. Kevin Curren, 4–6, 6–2, 6–3; Glenn Layendecker d. Jim Pugh, 3–6, 6–4, 6–1

=== WCT 1989 ===
1989 was the final year of the WCT tour. Only three events were organized, all of them were incorporated into the Nabisco Grand Prix and gaining ATP ranking points.

At the 19th (and last) WCT Finals in Reunion Arena, John McEnroe won his fifth Dallas title. His semifinal with Ivan Lendl produced the best match of the tournament, and McEnroe beat Lendl for the first time in over three years. The tournament was negatively impacted by the withdrawals of Boris Becker (who did not appear at all) and Andre Agassi (walking off the court during a second set match with McEnroe). Brad Gilbert entered the event to fill the gap for Becker and surprisingly made it to the final. Later in spring, Lendl captured last two WCT titles in Scottsdale and Forest Hills to close the WCT era.

Nabisco Grand Prix
Date	Location	Tournament	Prize Money/ Surface	Final	Semifinals
Mar 5	Dallas, USA	WCT Finals	$500,000; Carpet	(United States) John McEnroe d. (United States) Brad Gilbert, 6–3, 6–3, 7–6	John McEnroe d. Ivan Lendl, 6–7, 7–6, 6–2, 7–5; Brad Gilbert d. Mikael Pernfors, 6–3, 6–7, 6–3, 6–3
Mar 12	Scottsdale, USA	WCT Eagle Classic	$297,000; Hard	(Czechoslovakia) Ivan Lendl d. (Sweden) Stefan Edberg, 6–2, 6–3	Ivan Lendl d. Emilio Sánchez, 6–2, 3–6, 6–3; Stefan Edberg d. Amos Mansdorf, 6–7, 6–4, 6–1
May 8	Forest Hills, USA	Eagle Tournament of Champions	$485,000; Clay (Har-Tru)	(Czechoslovakia) Ivan Lendl d. (Peru) Jaime Yzaga, 6–2, 6–1	Ivan Lendl d. Andre Agassi, 6–2, 6–3; Jaime Yzaga d. Michael Chang, 6–4, 6–3

=== WCT 1990 ===
There was no WCT tour in 1990, when the ATP established its own circuit named the ATP Tour, however there was one (final) tournament sanctioned by WCT. The Forest Hills WCT at West Side Tennis Club was moved from green clay to hardcourts and run as special non-ATP Tour event. Ivan Lendl stamped his WCT dominance winning the last title.

Special event
Date	Location	Tournament	Prize Money/ Surface	Final	Semifinals
Aug 26	Forest Hills, USA	WCT Tournament of Champions	$500,000; Hard	(Czechoslovakia) Ivan Lendl d. (United States) Aaron Krickstein, 6–4, 6–7, 6–3	Ivan Lendl d. Henri Leconte, 6–7, 6–3, 6–1,

== Season end Championships ==
The WCT Finals was a men's indoor carpet court tennis tournament that served as the season-ending championship on the annual WCT Circuit administered by World Championship Tennis. From 1971–1989 the event was held annually in Dallas, Texas, United States.
