= 1973 World Championship Tennis Finals =

- Date: May 7–13
- Edition: 3rd
- Category: World Championship Tennis
- Draw: 8S
- Prize money: $100,000
- Surface: Carpet / indoor
- Location: Dallas, Texas, US
- Venue: Moody Coliseum

Champions

Singles
- (United States) Stan Smith
← 1972 ·	WCT Finals	· 1974 →

The 1973 World Championship Tennis Finals was a men's tennis tournament played on indoor carpet courts. It was the 3rd edition of the WCT Finals and was part of the 1973 World Championship Tennis circuit. The tournament was played at the Moody Coliseum in Dallas, Texas in the United States and was held from May 7 through May 13, 1973. First-seeded Stan Smith won the singles title and earned $50,000 first-prize money.

== Final ==
=== Singles ===
(United States) Stan Smith defeated (United States) Arthur Ashe 6–3, 6–3, 4–6, 6–4

- It was Smith's 7th singles title of the year and the 42nd of his career in the Open Era.

== See also ==
- 1973 WCT World Doubles
