= 1986 Buick WCT Finals – Singles =

Singles
- 1986 Buick WCT Finals

Final
- Champion: (Sweden) Anders Järryd
- Runner-up: (West Germany) Boris Becker
- Score: 6–7, 6–1, 6–1, 6–4

Details
- Draw: 12
- Seeds: 4

Events
Singles
- Buick WCT Finals

Ivan Lendl was the defending champion but did not compete that year.

Unseeded Anders Järryd won in the final 6–7, 6–1, 6–1, 6–4 against second-seeded Boris Becker.

== Seeds ==
A champion seed is indicated in bold text while text in italics indicates the round in which that seed was eliminated.

1. (Sweden) Mats Wilander (semifinals)
2. (West Germany) Boris Becker (final)
3. (Sweden) Stefan Edberg (semifinals)
4. (Sweden) Joakim Nyström (quarterfinals)

== Draw ==
Key

- Q = Qualifier
- WC = Wild card
- LL = Lucky loser
- Alt = Alternate
- ITF = ITF entry
- PR = Protected ranking
- SR = Special ranking
- SE = Special exempt
- JE = Junior exempt
- JR = Junior Accelerator Programme entrant
- CO = College Accelerator Programme entrant
- NG = Next Gen Accelerator Program entrant
- w/o = Walkover
- r = Retired
- d = Defaulted

First round
(United States) **Johan Kriek**	**6**	**6**	2	4	**6**
(United States) Brad Gilbert	4	1	**6**	**6**	3
(France) Thierry Tulasne	3	0^{r}
(Sweden) **Anders Järryd**	**6**	4
(France) **Yannick Noah**	**7**	**6**	**6**
(United States) Matt Anger	5	4	2
(Czechoslovakia) Miloslav Mečíř	**7**	3	2	6
(United States) **Paul Annacone**	6	**6**	**6**	**7**

Quarterfinals
1	(Sweden) **Mats Wilander**	3	4	**7**	**6**	**6**
(United States) Johan Kriek	**6**	**6**	6	3	2
4	(Sweden) Joakim Nyström	4	2	4
(Sweden) **Anders Järryd**	**6**	**6**	**6**
(France) Yannick Noah	3	6	6
3	(Sweden) **Stefan Edberg**	**6**	**7**	**7**
(United States) Paul Annacone	5	5	1
2	(West Germany) **Boris Becker**	**7**	**7**	**6**

Semifinals
1	(Sweden) Mats Wilander	4	5	3
(Sweden) **Anders Järryd**	**6**	**7**	**6**
3	(Sweden) Stefan Edberg	6	6	**6**	6
2	(West Germany) **Boris Becker**	**7**	**7**	4	**7**

Final
(Sweden) **Anders Järryd**	6	**6**	**6**	**6**
2	(West Germany) Boris Becker	**7**	1	1	4
