= 1988 World Championship Tennis Finals – Singles =

Singles
- 1988 WCT Finals

Final
- Champion: (West Germany) Boris Becker
- Runner-up: (Sweden) Stefan Edberg
- Score: 6–4, 1–6, 7–5, 6–2

Events
Singles
← 1987 ·	World Championship Tennis Finals	· 1989 →

Miloslav Mečíř was the defending champion but did not compete that year.

Boris Becker won in the final 6–4, 1–6, 7–5, 6–2 against Stefan Edberg.

== Seeds ==
A champion seed is indicated in bold text while text in italics indicates the round in which that seed was eliminated.

1. (West Germany) **Boris Becker (champion)**
2. (Sweden) Stefan Edberg (final)
3. (France) Yannick Noah (semifinals)
4. (Australia) Pat Cash (quarterfinals)

== Draw ==
=== Key ===
- Q = Qualifier
- WC = Wild card
- LL = Lucky loser
- Alt = Alternate
- SE = Special exempt
- PR = Protected ranking
- ITF = ITF entry
- JE = Junior exempt
- w/o = Walkover
- r = Retired
- d = Defaulted
- SR = Special ranking

Quarterfinals
1	(West Germany) **Boris Becker**	**6**	3	**6**	**6**
(Ecuador) Andrés Gómez	4	**6**	2	4
4	(Australia) Pat Cash	6^{3}	**6**	6^{1}	4
(United States) **Brad Gilbert**	**7^{7}**	4	**7^{7}**	**6**
(United States) Tim Mayotte	4	3	3
3	(France) **Yannick Noah**	**6**	**6**	**6**
(Argentina) Martín Jaite	4	3	0
2	(Sweden) **Stefan Edberg**	**6**	**6**	**6**

Semifinals
1	(West Germany) **Boris Becker**	**6**	**6**	**6**
(United States) Brad Gilbert	4	2	1
3	(France) Yannick Noah	2	**6**	3	3
2	(Sweden) **Stefan Edberg**	**6**	4	**6**	**6**

Final
1	(West Germany) **Boris Becker**	**6**	1	**7**	**6**
2	(Sweden) Stefan Edberg	4	**6**	5	2
