= 1972 World Championship Tennis Finals – Singles =

Singles
- 1972 World Championship Tennis Finals

Final
- Champion: (Australia) Ken Rosewall
- Runner-up: (Australia) Rod Laver
- Score: 4–6, 6–0, 6–3, 6–7^{(3–7)}, 7–6^{(7–5)}

Events
Singles
← 1971 ·	World Championship Tennis Finals	· 1973 →

In the 1972 World Championship Tennis Finals – Singles, Ken Rosewall was the defending champion, having previously won the tennis competition, and won in the final 4–6, 6–0, 6–3, 6–7^{(3–7)}, 7–6^{(7–5)} against Rod Laver. Of particular note, the final is credited as the "match that made tennis in the United States" because its unprecedented domestic television audience of 23 million fueled a massive increase in the sport's popularity.

== Seeds ==
A champion seed is indicated in bold text while text in italics indicates the round in which that seed was eliminated.

1. (Australia) Rod Laver (final)
2. (Australia) **Ken Rosewall (champion)**
3. (United States) Arthur Ashe (semifinals)
4. (South Africa) Cliff Drysdale (quarterfinals)
5. (United States) Marty Riessen (semifinals)
6. (Netherlands) Tom Okker (quarterfinals)
7. (United States) Robert Lutz (quarterfinals)
8. (Australia) John Newcombe (quarterfinals)

== Draw ==
=== Key ===
- Q = Qualifier
- WC = Wild card
- LL = Lucky loser
- Alt = Alternate
- SE = Special exempt
- PR = Protected ranking
- ITF = ITF entry
- JE = Junior exempt
- w/o = Walkover
- r = Retired
- d = Defaulted
- SR = Special ranking

Quarterfinals
1	(Australia) **Rod Laver**	**6**	**6**	**6**
8	(Australia) John Newcombe	4	4	4
4	(South Africa) Cliff Drysdale	**7**	**6**	2	5	3
5	(United States) **Marty Riessen**	5	4	**6**	**7**	**6**
6	(Netherlands) Tom Okker	4	1	3
3	(United States) **Arthur Ashe**	**6**	**6**	**6**
7	(United States) Robert Lutz	1	**6**	3	**6**	1
2	(Australia) **Ken Rosewall**	**6**	3	**6**	4	**6**

Semifinals
1	(Australia) **Rod Laver**	4	4	**6**	**6**	**6**
5	(United States) Marty Riessen	**6**	**6**	1	2	0
3	(United States) Arthur Ashe	4	2	6
2	(Australia) **Ken Rosewall**	**6**	**6**	**7**

Final
1	(Australia) Rod Laver	**6**	0	3	**7**	6^{5}
2	(Australia) **Ken Rosewall**	4	**6**	**6**	6	**7^{7}**
