= 1972 World Championship Tennis Finals =

- Date: May 8–14
- Edition: 2nd
- Category: World Championship Tennis
- Draw: 8S
- Prize money: $100,000
- Surface: Carpet / indoor
- Location: Dallas, TX, United States
- Venue: Moody Coliseum

Champions

Singles
- (Australia) Ken Rosewall
- WCT Finals

The 1972 World Championship Tennis Finals was a men's tennis tournament played on indoor carpet courts. It was the 2nd edition of the WCT Finals and was the season-ending tournament of the 1972 World Championship Tennis circuit. The top eight points winners of the circuit qualified for the tournament which was played at the Moody Coliseum in Dallas, Texas in the United States and ran from May 8 through May 14, 1972. Ken Rosewall won the singles title and the $50,000 first prize. The final was broadcast live in the United States by NBC and watched by an estimated 21.3 million viewers. In his book, The Education of a Tennis Player, finalist Rod Laver commented, "I think if one match can be said to have made tennis in the United States, this was it."

== Final ==
=== Singles ===
(Australia) Ken Rosewall defeated (Australia) Rod Laver 4–6, 6–0, 6–3, 6–7^{(3–7)}, 7–6^{(7–5)}

- It was Rosewall's 5th title of the year and the 21st of his professional career.

== See also ==
- 1972 World Championship Tennis Winter Finals
- 1972 Commercial Union Assurance Masters
