= 1973 WCT World Doubles =

- Date: May 3–7
- Edition: 1st
- Category: World Championship Tennis
- Draw: 8D
- Prize money: $80,000
- Surface: Carpet / indoor
- Location: Montreal, Canada
- Venue: Maurice Richard Arena
- Attendance: 16,726

Champions

Doubles
- (United States) Robert Lutz / (United States) Stan Smith
- WCT World Doubles

The 1973 WCT World Doubles, also known by its sponsored name Rothman's World Doubles Championship, was a men's tennis tournament played on indoor carpet courts at the Maurice Richard Arena in Montreal, Canada that was part of the 1973 World Championship Tennis circuit. It was the tour finals for the doubles season of the WCT Tour and featured the eight top-ranking teams. It was the inaugural edition of the tournament and was held from May 3 through May 7, 1973. The third-seeded team of Robert Lutz and Stan Smith won the title and earned $40,000 first-prize money.

== Final ==
=== Doubles ===
(United States) Robert Lutz / (United States) Stan Smith defeated (Netherlands) Tom Okker / (United States) Marty Riessen 6–2, 7–6^{(7–1)}, 6–0

== See also ==
- 1973 World Championship Tennis Finals
