= 1986 WCT World Doubles =

- Date: 6–12 January
- Edition: 14th
- Surface: Carpet / indoor
- Location: London, Great Britain

Champions

Doubles
- (Switzerland) Heinz Günthardt / (Hungary) Balázs Taróczy
← 1985 ·	WCT World Doubles

The 1986 WCT World Doubles was a tennis tournament played on indoor carpet courts at Royal Albert Hall in London, Great Britain that was part of the 1986 Nabisco Grand Prix. It was the tour finals for the doubles season of the WCT Tour section. The tournament was held from January 6 through January 12, 1986.

== Final ==
=== Doubles ===
(Switzerland) Heinz Günthardt / (Hungary) Balázs Taróczy defeated (United States) Paul Annacone / (South Africa) Christo van Rensburg 6–4, 1–6, 7–6, 6–7, 6–4

== See also ==
- 1986 Buick WCT Finals
