= 1986 Buick WCT Finals =

- Date: April 7–14
- Edition: 16th
- Category: Grand Prix
- Draw: 12S
- Prize money: $500,000
- Surface: Carpet / indoor
- Location: Dallas, Texas, U.S.
- Venue: Reunion Arena

Champions

Singles
- (Sweden) Anders Järryd
← 1985 ·	WCT Finals	· 1987 →

The 1986 Buick WCT Finals was a men's tennis tournament played on indoor carpet courts. It was the 16th edition of the WCT Finals, and was part of the 1986 Nabisco Grand Prix. It was played at the Reunion Arena in Dallas, Texas in the United States from April 7 through April 14, 1986. Unseeded Anders Järryd won the singles title.

== Final ==
=== Singles ===
(Sweden) Anders Järryd defeated (West Germany) Boris Becker 6–7^{(3–7)}, 6–1, 6–1, 6–4

- It was Järryd's first title of the year and the sixth of his career.

== See also ==
- 1986 WCT World Doubles
