= 1988 WCT Finals =

- Date: March 28 – April 4
- Edition: 18th
- Draw: 8S
- Prize money: $500,000
- Location: Dallas, USA
- Venue: Reunion Arena

Champions

Singles
- (West Germany) Boris Becker
← 1987 ·	WCT Finals	· 1989 →

The 1988 WCT Finals was a men's tennis tournament played on indoor carpet courts. It was the 18th edition of the WCT Finals and was part of the 1988 Nabisco Grand Prix. It was played at the Reunion Arena in Dallas, Texas in the United States from March 28 through April 4, 1988.

== Final ==
=== Singles ===
(West Germany) Boris Becker defeated (Sweden) Stefan Edberg 6–4, 1–6, 7–5, 6–2

- It was Becker's 4th title of the year and the 22nd of his career.

== See also ==
- Becker–Edberg rivalry
