= 1973 World Championship Tennis Finals – Singles =

Singles
- 1973 World Championship Tennis Finals

Final
- Champion: (United States) Stan Smith
- Runner-up: (United States) Arthur Ashe
- Score: 6–3, 6–3, 4–6, 6–4

Details
- Draw: 8
- Seeds: 8

Events
Singles
← 1972 ·	World Championship Tennis Finals	· 1974 →

Ken Rosewall was the defending champion but lost in the semifinals to Arthur Ashe.

Stan Smith won the singles title of the 1973 World Championship Tennis Finals after a 6–3, 6–3, 4–6, 6–4 in the final against Ashe.

== Seeds ==
A champion seed is indicated in bold text while text in italics indicates the round in which that seed was eliminated.

1. (United States) **Stan Smith (champion)**
2. (United Kingdom) Roger Taylor (quarterfinals)
3. (United States) Marty Riessen (quarterfinals)
4. (Australia) Rod Laver (semifinals)
5. (Australia) Roy Emerson (quarterfinals)
6. (United States) Arthur Ashe (final)
7. (Australia) Ken Rosewall (semifinals)
8. (Australia) John Alexander (quarterfinals)

== Draw ==
=== Key ===
- Q = Qualifier
- WC = Wild card
- LL = Lucky loser
- Alt = Alternate
- SE = Special exempt
- PR = Protected ranking
- ITF = ITF entry
- JE = Junior exempt
- w/o = Walkover
- r = Retired
- d = Defaulted
- SR = Special ranking

Quarterfinals
1	(United States) **Stan Smith**	**6**	**6**	**6**
8	(Australia) John Alexander	4	2	1
4	(Australia) **Rod Laver**	**7**	**6**	**7**
5	(Australia) Roy Emerson	5	2	5
6	(United States) **Arthur Ashe**	**7^{7}**	4	**7**	3	**6**
3	(United States) Marty Riessen	6^{3}	**6**	5	**6**	1
7	(Australia) **Ken Rosewall**	4	**6**	6^{5}	**6**	**6**
2	(United Kingdom) Roger Taylor	**6**	2	**7^{7}**	1	4

Semifinals
1	(United States) **Stan Smith**	4	**6**	**7^{7}**	**7**
4	(Australia) Rod Laver	**6**	4	6^{2}	5
6	(United States) **Arthur Ashe**	**6**	**6**	5	1	**6**
7	(Australia) Ken Rosewall	4	2	**7**	**6**	2

Final
1	(United States) **Stan Smith**	**6**	**6**	4	**6**
6	(United States) Arthur Ashe	3	3	**6**	4
