= 1973 WCT World Doubles – Doubles =

Doubles
- 1973 WCT World Doubles

Final
- Champion: (United States) Robert Lutz (United States) Stan Smith
- Runner-up: (Netherlands) Tom Okker (United States) Marty Riessen
- Score: 6–2, 7–6^{(7–1)}, 6–0

Details
- Draw: 8
- Seeds: 4

Events
Doubles
WCT World Doubles	· 1974 →

The 1973 WCT World Doubles was the first edition of the WCT World Doubles tennis tournament. The eight highest ranking teams qualified for the event. Third seeds, Robert Lutz and Stan Smith won the tournament in straight sets in the final against Tom Okker and Marty Riessen

== Seeds ==
1. (Australia) Roy Emerson / (Australia) Rod Laver (quarterfinals)
2. (Netherlands) Tom Okker / (United States) Marty Riessen (final)
3. (United States) Robert Lutz / (United States) Stan Smith (champions)
4. (Australia) Ken Rosewall / (Australia) Fred Stolle (semifinals)

== Draw ==
=== Key ===
- Q = Qualifier
- WC = Wild card
- LL = Lucky loser
- Alt = Alternate
- ITF = ITF entry
- PR = Protected ranking
- SR = Special ranking
- SE = Special exempt
- JE = Junior exempt
- JR = Junior Accelerator Programme entrant
- CO = College Accelerator Programme entrant
- NG = Next Gen Accelerator Program entrant
- w/o = Walkover
- r = Retired
- d = Defaulted

=== Finals ===
Quarterfinals
1	(Australia) Roy Emerson (Australia) Rod Laver	6	7	6
(Australia) Terry Addison (Australia) Colin Dibley	4	5	1
3	(United States) Robert Lutz (United States) Stan Smith	7^{9}	6	3	7^{10}
(Socialist Federal Republic of Yugoslavia) Nikola Pilić (Australia) Allan Stone	6^{7}	3	6	6^{8}
2	(Netherlands) Tom Okker (United States) Marty Riessen	6^{5}	6^{3}	7^{10}	6	6
(United Kingdom) Mark Cox (United Kingdom) Graham Stilwell	7^{7}	7	6^{8}	2	2
4	(Australia) Ken Rosewall (Australia) Fred Stolle	6	6^{3}	6	7^{7}
(United States) Arthur Ashe (United States) Roscoe Tanner	1	7^{7}	4	6^{5}

Semifinals
1	(Australia) Roy Emerson (Australia) Rod Laver	6^{4}	6	6^{4}	6^{4}
3	(United States) Robert Lutz (United States) Stan Smith	7^{7}	4	7^{7}	7^{7}
2	(Netherlands) Tom Okker (United States) Marty Riessen	6	6	6^{10}	2	6
4	(Australia) Ken Rosewall (Australia) Fred Stolle	2	3	7^{12}	6	3

Final
3	(United States) Robert Lutz (United States) Stan Smith	6	7^{7}	6
2	(Netherlands) Tom Okker (United States) Marty Riessen	2	6^{1}	0
