= 1989 World Championship Tennis Finals – Singles =

Singles
- 1989 WCT Finals

Final
- Champion: (United States) John McEnroe
- Runner-up: (United States) Brad Gilbert
- Score: 6–3, 6–3, 7–6

Events
Singles
- WCT Finals

Boris Becker was the defending champion but did not compete that year.

John McEnroe won in the final 6–3, 6–3, 7–6 against Brad Gilbert.

The finals were held in Dallas, Texas at Reunion Arena.

== Seeds ==
A champion seed is indicated in bold text while text in italics indicates the round in which that seed was eliminated.

1. (United States) **John McEnroe (champion)**
2. (Sweden) Mats Wilander (quarterfinals)
3. (Czechoslovakia) Ivan Lendl (semifinals)
4. (Sweden) Stefan Edberg (quarterfinals)

== Draw ==
Key

- Q = Qualifier
- WC = Wild card
- LL = Lucky loser
- Alt = Alternate
- ITF = ITF entry
- PR = Protected ranking
- SR = Special ranking
- SE = Special exempt
- JE = Junior exempt
- JR = Junior Accelerator Programme entrant
- CO = College Accelerator Programme entrant
- NG = Next Gen Accelerator Program entrant
- w/o = Walkover
- r = Retired
- d = Defaulted

Quarterfinals
1	(United States) **John McEnroe**	4	3
(United States) Andre Agassi	**6**	0^{r}
3	(Czechoslovakia) **Ivan Lendl**	**7**	1	**7**	6	**7**
(Switzerland) Jakob Hlasek	6	**6**	6	**7**	6
(United States) **Brad Gilbert**	**7**	**6**	**6**
4	(Sweden) Stefan Edberg	6	1	3
(Sweden) **Mikael Pernfors**	2	**6**	3	**6**	**6**
2	(Sweden) Mats Wilander	**6**	1	**6**	2	3

Semifinals
1	(United States) **John McEnroe**	6	**7**	**6**	**7**
3	(Czechoslovakia) Ivan Lendl	**7**	6	2	5
(United States) **Brad Gilbert**	**6**	6	**6**	**6**
(Sweden) Mikael Pernfors	3	**7**	3	3

Final
1	(United States) **John McEnroe**	**6**	**6**	**7**
(United States) Brad Gilbert	3	3	6
