= 1989 WCT Finals =

- Date: February 28 – March 6
- Edition: 19th
- Category: Grand Prix
- Draw: 8S
- Prize money: $500,000
- Surface: Carpet / indoor
- Location: Dallas, Texas, United States
- Venue: Reunion Arena

Champions

Singles
- (United States) John McEnroe
← 1988 ·	WCT Finals

The 1989 WCT Finals was a men's tennis tournament played on indoor carpet courts. It was the 19th and last edition of the WCT Finals and was part of the 1989 Nabisco Grand Prix. It was played at the Reunion Arena in Dallas, Texas in the United States from February 28 through March 6, 1989. First-seeded John McEnroe won his record fifth singles title at the event after 1979, 1981, 1983 and 1984.

== Final ==
=== Singles ===
(United States) John McEnroe defeated (United States) Brad Gilbert 6–3, 6–3, 7–6

- It was McEnroe's 2nd singles title of the year and the 74th of his career.
