= 1971 World Championship Tennis Finals – Singles =

Singles
- 1971 World Championship Tennis Finals

Final
- Champion: (Australia) Ken Rosewall
- Runner-up: (Australia) Rod Laver
- Score: 6–4, 1–6, 7–6^{(7–3)}, 7–6^{(7–4)}

Details
- Draw: 8

Events
Singles
- World Championship Tennis Finals

Ken Rosewall won the singles title of the 1971 World Championship Tennis Finals with a 6–4, 1–6, 7–6^{(7–3)}, 7–6^{(7–4)} victory in the final against Rod Laver.

== Seeds ==
A champion seed is indicated in bold text while text in italics indicates the round in which that seed was eliminated.

1. (Netherlands) Tom Okker (semifinals)
2. (Australia) Rod Laver (final)
3. (Australia) **Ken Rosewall (champion)**
4. (South Africa) Cliff Drysdale (quarterfinals)
5. (United States) Arthur Ashe (semifinals)
6. (Australia) John Newcombe (quarterfinals)
7. (United States) Marty Riessen (quarterfinals)
8. (United States) Robert Lutz (quarterfinals)

== Draw ==
Quarterfinals
1	(Netherlands) **Tom Okker**	**6**	**6**	**6**
7	(United States) Marty Riessen	3	3	0
3	(Australia) **Ken Rosewall**	**7**	**6**	5	**6**
6	(Australia) John Newcombe	5	2	**7**	3
5	(United States) **Arthur Ashe**	4	**7**	**6**	**6**
4	(South Africa) Cliff Drysdale	**6**	6	4	3
8	(United States) Robert Lutz	3	4	4
2	(Australia) **Rod Laver**	**6**	**6**	**6**

Semifinals
1	(Netherlands) Tom Okker	3	3	1
3	(Australia) **Ken Rosewall**	**6**	**6**	**6**
5	(United States) Arthur Ashe	3	**6**	3	3
2	(Australia) **Rod Laver**	**6**	1	**6**	**6**

Final
3	(Australia) **Ken Rosewall**	**6**	1	**7^{7}**	**7^{7}**
2	(Australia) Rod Laver	4	**6**	6^{3}	6^{4}
