= WCT Finals =

Tournament information
- Founded: 1971
- Abolished: 1989
- Editions: 19
- Location: Dallas, Texas; United States
- Venue: Moody Coliseum (1971–1979); Reunion Arena (1980–1989)
- Category: Year-end championships
- Surface: Carpet / Indoor

The WCT Finals was a men's tennis tournament that served as the season-ending championship for the WCT Circuit. From 1971–1989 the event was held annually in Texas on indoor carpet courts. The 1971 quarterfinals and semifinals were played in Houston, and final played at Moody Coliseum in Dallas. The 1972–1979 editions were played at Moody Coliseum, and the 1980–1989 tournaments at Reunion Arena in Dallas. The 1974 edition was the first tennis tournament to experiment with electronic line calling. The first edition of the WCT Finals was in November 1971, just a few days before the equivalent event of the rival Grand Prix circuit. But the second edition occurred just six months later to accommodate NBC's new tennis coverage; the tournament final between Ken Rosewall, Rod Laver is credited as "the match that made tennis in the United States" because its unprecedented domestic television audience of 23 million fueled a massive increase in the sport's popularity. The ensuing editions were also held in the spring. John McEnroe had the most overall success, winning a record five titles. Because of the popularity of the 1972 final, another edition, less important and with half the prize money, was held in November in Rome.The prize money offered to the winner, Arthur Ashe, was US$25,000 compared to the US$50,000 won by Ken Rosewall for the main edition in May. A decade later there were three editions of the WCT Finals; the most important one in Dallas, and the others in autumn in Naples, Italy, and in winter (in January 1983) in Detroit. The tournament was sponsored by Buick between 1985 and 1986, a brand of General Motors, and was called the "Buick WCT Finals".

== Finals ==
| Year | Champion | Runner-up | Score |
|---|---|---|---|
| 1971 | (Australia) Ken Rosewall | (Australia) Rod Laver | 6–4, 1–6, 7–6^{(7–3)}, 7–6^{(7–4)} |
| 1972 | (Australia) Ken Rosewall (2) | (Australia) Rod Laver | 4–6, 6–0, 6–3, 6–7^{(3–7)}, 7–6^{(7–5)} |
| 1973 | (United States) Stan Smith | (United States) Arthur Ashe | 6–3, 6–3, 4–6, 6–4 |
| 1974 | (Australia) John Newcombe | (Sweden) Björn Borg | 4–6, 6–3, 6–3, 6–2 |
| 1975 | (United States) Arthur Ashe | (Sweden) Björn Borg | 3–6, 6–4, 6–4, 6–0 |
| 1976 | (Sweden) Björn Borg | (Argentina) Guillermo Vilas | 1–6, 6–1, 7–5, 6–1 |
| 1977 | (United States) Jimmy Connors | (United States) Dick Stockton | 6–7^{(5–7)}, 6–1, 6–4, 6–3 |
| 1978 | (United States) Vitas Gerulaitis | (United States) Eddie Dibbs | 6–3, 6–2, 6–1 |
| 1979 | (United States) John McEnroe | (Sweden) Björn Borg | 7–5, 4–6, 6–2, 7–6^{(7–5)} |
| 1980 | (United States) Jimmy Connors (2) | (United States) John McEnroe | 2–6, 7–6^{(7–4)}, 6–1, 6–2 |
| 1981 | (United States) John McEnroe (2) | (South Africa) Johan Kriek | 6–1, 6–2, 6–4 |
| 1982 | (Czechoslovakia) Ivan Lendl | (United States) John McEnroe | 6–2, 3–6, 6–3, 6–3 |
| 1983 | (United States) John McEnroe (3) | (Czechoslovakia) Ivan Lendl | 6–2, 4–6, 6–3, 6–7^{(5–7)}, 7–6^{(7–0)} |
| 1984 | (United States) John McEnroe (4) | (United States) Jimmy Connors | 6–1, 6–2, 6–3 |
| 1985 | (Czechoslovakia) Ivan Lendl (2) | (United States) Tim Mayotte | 7–6^{(7–4)}, 6–4, 6–1 |
| 1986 | (Sweden) Anders Järryd | (West Germany) Boris Becker | 6–7^{(3–7)}, 6–1, 6–1, 6–4 |
| 1987 | (Czechoslovakia) Miloslav Mečíř | (United States) John McEnroe | 6–0, 3–6, 6–2, 6–2 |
| 1988 | (West Germany) Boris Becker | (Sweden) Stefan Edberg | 6–4, 1–6, 7–5, 6–2 |
| 1989 | (United States) John McEnroe (5) | (United States) Brad Gilbert | 6–3, 6–3, 7–6^{(7–3)} |

=== Seasonal finals events ===
| Year | Champion | Runner-up | Score |
|---|---|---|---|
| 1972 winter (Rome) | (United States) Arthur Ashe | (United States) Bob Lutz | 6–2, 3–6, 6–3, 3–6, 7–6 |
| 1982 fall (Naples) | (Czechoslovakia) Ivan Lendl | (Poland) Wojciech Fibak | 6–4, 6–2, 6–1 |
| 1982 winter (Detroit) | (Czechoslovakia) Ivan Lendl | (Argentina) Guillermo Vilas | 7–5, 6–2, 2–6, 6–4 |

== Records ==
| # | Titles |
|---|---|
| 5 | (United States) John McEnroe |
| 2 | (Australia) Ken Rosewall |
| 2 | (United States) Jimmy Connors |
| 2 | (Czechoslovakia) Ivan Lendl |

| # | Finals |
|---|---|
| 8 | (United States) John McEnroe |
| 4 | (Sweden) Björn Borg |
| 3 | (United States) Jimmy Connors |
| 3 | (Czechoslovakia) Ivan Lendl |
| 2 | (Australia) Ken Rosewall |
| 2 | (Australia) Rod Laver |
| 2 | (United States) Arthur Ashe |
| 2 | (Germany) Boris Becker |

| # | Appearances |
|---|---|
| 9 | (United States) John McEnroe |
| 6 | (United States) Arthur Ashe |
| 5 | (Australia) Rod Laver |
| 5 | (Sweden) Björn Borg |
| 5 | (United States) Vitas Gerulaitis |
| 5 | (United States) Jimmy Connors |
| 5 | (Czechoslovakia) Ivan Lendl |

| # | Match wins |
|---|---|
| 21 | (United States) John McEnroe |
| 10 | (Sweden) Björn Borg |
| 10 | (United States) Jimmy Connors |
| 10 | (Czechoslovakia) Ivan Lendl |
| 7 | (Australia) Ken Rosewall |
| 7 | (United States) Arthur Ashe |
| 7 | (United States) Vitas Gerulaitis |

- Won without dropping a set: John McEnroe (1981, 1984)
- Singles–doubles titles winners: Stan Smith (S–D), John McEnroe (S–D)

== See also ==
- WCT World Doubles
- Grand Slam Cup
- Masters Grand Prix
