= 1984 World Championship Tennis circuit =

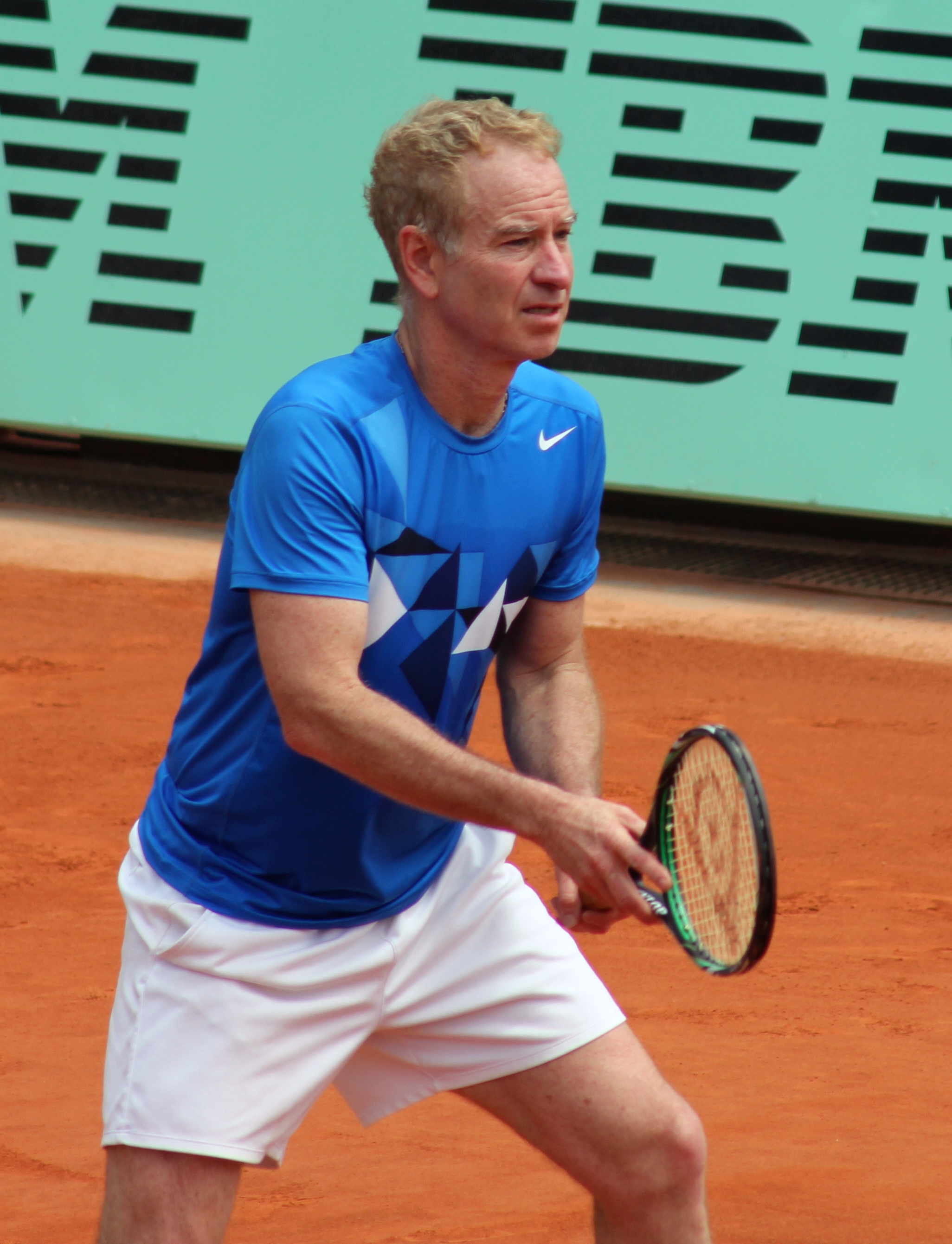
- McEnroe was title leader for the final WCT tour

Details
- Duration: 3 January 1984 – 7 May 1984
- Edition: 13th
- Tournaments: 5

Achievements (singles)
- Most titles: (United States) John McEnroe (3)
- Most finals: (United States) John McEnroe (3)

The 1984 World Championship Tennis circuit was one of the two rival professional male tennis circuits of 1984. It was organized by World Championship Tennis (WCT). The WCT circuit withdrew from the Grand Prix circuit in 1982 and reestablished its own full calendar season consisting of 20 tournaments. For the 1983 season the WCT circuit was downsized to eight tournaments and ran from January to May. The circuit was again downsized for the 1984 season to five tournaments and the best twelve competitors played at the WCT Finals in Dallas. It was the final year of the WCT as a separate tennis circuit.

== Calendar ==
=== January ===
Week	Tournament	Champions	Runners-up	Semifinalists	Quarterfinalists
3 Jan	WCT World Doubles; London, United Kingdom; Carpet (i) – $200,000 – 8D; Doubles	(Sweden) Anders Järryd (Sweden) Hans Simonsson; 1–6, 6–3, 3–6, 6–4, 6–3	(Czechoslovakia) Pavel Složil (Czechoslovakia) Tomáš Šmíd	(Australia) Edmonson / (United States) Stewart (United States) Fleming / (United States) Buehning	
30 Jan	United Virginia Bank Classic; Richmond, United States; Carpet (i) – $100,000 – 16S/8D	(United States) John McEnroe; 6–3, 7–6^{(9–7)}	(United States) Steve Denton	(United States) Vitas Gerulaitis (United States) Mark Dickson	(Sweden) Stefan Edberg (United States) Eric Korita (United States) Greg Holmes (United States) Jimmy Arias
30 Jan	United Virginia Bank Classic; Richmond, United States; Carpet (i) – $100,000 – 16S/8D	(United States) John McEnroe (United States) Patrick McEnroe; 7–6, 6–2	(United States) Steve Denton (South Africa) Kevin Curren	(United States) Vitas Gerulaitis (United States) Mark Dickson	(Sweden) Stefan Edberg (United States) Eric Korita (United States) Greg Holmes (United States) Jimmy Arias

=== April ===
Week	Tournament	Champions	Runners-up	Semifinalists	Quarterfinalists
2 Apr	Houston WCT; Houston, United States; Clay – $250,000 – 16S/8D	(United States) Mark Dickson; 6–3, 6–2	(United States) Sammy Giammalva, Jr.	(United States) Bill Scanlon (Australia) Pat Cash	(United States) Jimmy Arias (United States) Steve Denton (India) Vijay Amritraj (United States) Tim Mayotte
2 Apr	Houston WCT; Houston, United States; Clay – $250,000 – 16S/8D	(Australia) Pat Cash (Australia) Paul McNamee; 7–5, 4–6, 6–3	(United States) David Dowlen (Nigeria) Nduka Odizor	(United States) Bill Scanlon (Australia) Pat Cash	(United States) Jimmy Arias (United States) Steve Denton (India) Vijay Amritraj (United States) Tim Mayotte
24 Apr	World Championship Tennis Finals; Dallas, United States; WCT Finals; Carpet (i) – $500,000 – 8S; Singles	(United States) John McEnroe; 6–1, 6–2, 6–3	(United States) Jimmy Connors	(South Africa) Kevin Curren (United States) Jimmy Arias	(United States) Vitas Gerulaitis (United States) Johan Kriek (United States) Eliot Teltscher (United States) Tim Mayotte

=== May ===
Week	Tournament	Champions	Runners-up	Semifinalists	Quarterfinalists
6 May	WCT Tournament of Champions; Forest Hills, New York, United States; Clay – $300,000 – 52S / 32D; Singles – Doubles	(United States) John McEnroe; 6–4, 6–2	(Czechoslovakia) Ivan Lendl	(United States) Jimmy Connors (United States) Jimmy Arias	(United States) Aaron Krickstein (United States) Steve Meister (Australia) Brad Drewett (United States) Johan Kriek
6 May	WCT Tournament of Champions; Forest Hills, New York, United States; Clay – $300,000 – 52S / 32D; Singles – Doubles	(United States) David Dowlen (Nigeria) Nduka Odizor; 7–6, 7–5	(United States) Ernie Fernandez (United States) David Pate	(United States) Jimmy Connors (United States) Jimmy Arias	(United States) Aaron Krickstein (United States) Steve Meister (Australia) Brad Drewett (United States) Johan Kriek

== See also ==
- 1984 Grand Prix circuit
