= 1984 United Virginia Bank Classic =

- Date: January 30 – February 5
- Edition: 19th
- Category: WCT
- Draw: 16S / 8D
- Prize money: $100,000
- Surface: Carpet / indoor
- Location: Richmond, Virginia, United States
- Venue: Richmond Coliseum

Champions

Singles
- (United States) John McEnroe

Doubles
- (United States) John McEnroe / (United States) Patrick McEnroe
← 1983 ·	Richmond WCT

The 1984 United Virginia Bank Classic, also known as the Richmond WCT, was a men's tennis tournament played on indoor carpet courts at the Richmond Coliseum in Richmond, Virginia in the United States. The event was part of 1984 World Championship Tennis circuit. It was the 19th and final edition of the tournament and was held from January 30 through February 5, 1984. First-seeded John McEnroe won the singles title and the $30,000 first-prize money.

== Finals ==
=== Singles ===
(United States) John McEnroe defeated (United States) Steve Denton 6–3, 7–6^{(9–7)}

- It was McEnroe's 2nd singles title of the year and the 48th of his career.

=== Doubles ===
(United States) John McEnroe / (United States) Patrick McEnroe defeated (United States) Steve Denton / (South Africa) Kevin Curren 7–6, 6–2
