= 1981 World Championship Tennis Finals – Singles =

Singles
- 1981 World Championship Tennis Finals

Final
- Champion: (United States) John McEnroe
- Runner-up: (South Africa) Johan Kriek
- Score: 6–1, 6–2, 6–4

Events
Singles
| ← 1980 · | World Championship Tennis Finals | · 1982 → |

Jimmy Connors was the defending champion but did not compete that year.

John McEnroe won in the final 6–1, 6–2, 6–4 against Johan Kriek.

== Seeds ==
A champion seed is indicated in bold text while text in italics indicates the round in which that seed was eliminated.

1. (United States) **John McEnroe (champion)**
2. (United States) Roscoe Tanner (semifinals)

== Draw ==
=== Key ===
- Q = Qualifier
- WC = Wild card
- LL = Lucky loser
- Alt = Alternate
- SE = Special exempt
- PR = Protected ranking
- ITF = ITF entry
- JE = Junior exempt
- w/o = Walkover
- r = Retired
- d = Defaulted
- SR = Special ranking

Quarterfinals
1 | (United States) **John McEnroe** | **7** | **6** | **6**
(United States) Sandy Mayer | 5 | 4 | 3
(United States) **Brian Gottfried** | **7** | **6** | **6**
(United States) Sammy Giammalva Jr. | 5 | 3 | 1
(Poland) Wojciech Fibak | 5 | **6** | 1 | 4
(South Africa) **Johan Kriek** | **7** | 3 | **6** | **6**
(India) Vijay Amritraj | 2 | **6** | **6** | 6^{6} | 4
2 | (United States) **Roscoe Tanner** | **6** | 1 | 2 | **7^{8}** | **6**

Semifinals
1 | (United States) **John McEnroe** | **6** | **6** | **6**
(United States) Brian Gottfried | 3 | 4 | 1
(South Africa) **Johan Kriek** | **7^{7}** | **6** | 4 | 0 | **6**
2 | (United States) Roscoe Tanner | 6^{2} | 3 | **6** | **6** | 4

Final
1 | (United States) **John McEnroe** | **6** | **6** | **6**
(South Africa) Johan Kriek | 1 | 2 | 4
