= 1984 WCT World Doubles =

- Date: January 3–8
- Edition: 12th
- Draw: 8D
- Prize money: $200,000
- Surface: Carpet / indoor
- Location: London, United Kingdom
- Venue: Royal Albert Hall

Champions

Doubles
- (Czechoslovakia) Pavel Složil / (Czechoslovakia) Tomáš Šmíd
← 1983 ·	WCT World Doubles	· 1985 →

The 1984 WCT World Doubles, also known by its sponsored name Barratt World Doubles Championship, was a men's tennis tournament played on indoor carpet courts at Royal Albert Hall in London, United Kingdom that was part of the 1984 World Championship Tennis circuit. It was the tour finals for the doubles season of the WCT Tour section. The tournament was held from January 3 through January 8, 1984.

== Final ==
=== Doubles ===
(Czechoslovakia) Pavel Složil / (Czechoslovakia) Tomáš Šmíd defeated (Sweden) Anders Järryd / (Sweden) Hans Simonsson 1–6, 6–3, 3–6, 6–4, 6–3

- It was Složil's 1st doubles title of the year and the 20th of his career.

== See also ==
- 1984 World Championship Tennis Finals
