= 1984 World Championship Tennis Finals =

- Date: April 24 – 30
- Edition: 14th
- Category: World Championship Tennis
- Draw: 12S
- Prize money: $500,000
- Surface: Carpet / indoor
- Location: Dallas, Texas, U.S.
- Venue: Reunion Arena

Champions

Singles
- (United States) John McEnroe
← 1983 ·	WCT Finals	· 1985 →

The 1984 World Championship Tennis Finals, also known by its sponsored name Buick WCT Finals, was a tennis tournament played on indoor carpet courts. It was the 14th edition of the WCT Finals and was part of the 1984 World Championship Tennis circuit. It was played at the Reunion Arena in Dallas, Texas in the United States and was held from April 24 through April 30, 1984. First-seeded and defending champion John McEnroe won the title and the accompanying $150,000 first-prize money. It was his fourth WCT Finals title, a record, and his sixth successive final.

== Final ==
=== Singles ===
(United States) John McEnroe defeated (United States) Jimmy Connors 6–1, 6–2, 6–3

- It was McEnroe's 5th singles title of the year and the 51st of his career.

== See also ==
- 1984 WCT World Doubles
