= 1978 WCT World Doubles =

- Date: May 3–7
- Edition: 6th
- Prize money: $200,000
- Surface: Carpet / indoor
- Location: Municipal Auditorium, Kansas City, Missouri, U.S.

Champions

Doubles
- (Poland) Wojtek Fibak / (Netherlands) Tom Okker
← 1977 ·	WCT World Doubles	· 1979 →

The 1978 WCT World Doubles was a tennis tournament played on indoor carpet courts in Kansas City, Missouri, United States that was part of the 1978 Colgate-Palmolive Grand Prix. It was the tour finals for the doubles season of the WCT Tour section. The tournament was held from May 3 through May 7, 1978. It was the first edition to operate a Round robin system.

== Final ==
=== Doubles ===
(Poland) Wojciech Fibak / (Netherlands) Tom Okker defeated (United States) Robert Lutz / (United States) Stan Smith 6–7, 6–4, 6–0, 6–3

== See also ==
- 1978 World Championship Tennis Finals
