= 1981 WCT World Doubles =

- Date: January 6– 11
- Edition: 9th
- Surface: carpet / indoor
- Location: London, England
- Venue: Olympia

Champions

Doubles
- (Australia) Peter McNamara / (Australia) Paul McNamee
← 1980 ·	WCT World Doubles	· 1982 →

The 1981 WCT World Doubles was a men's tennis tournament played on indoor carpet courts at Olympia in London, England that was part of the 1981 Volvo Grand Prix. It was the tour finals for the doubles season of the WCT Tour section. The tournament was held from January 6 through January 11, 1981.

== Final ==
=== Doubles ===
(Australia) Peter McNamara / (Australia) Paul McNamee defeated (United States) Victor Amaya / (United States) Hank Pfister 6–3, 2–6, 3–6, 6–3, 6–2

== See also ==
- 1981 World Championship Tennis Finals
