= 1983 World Championship Tennis circuit =

Tennis circuit

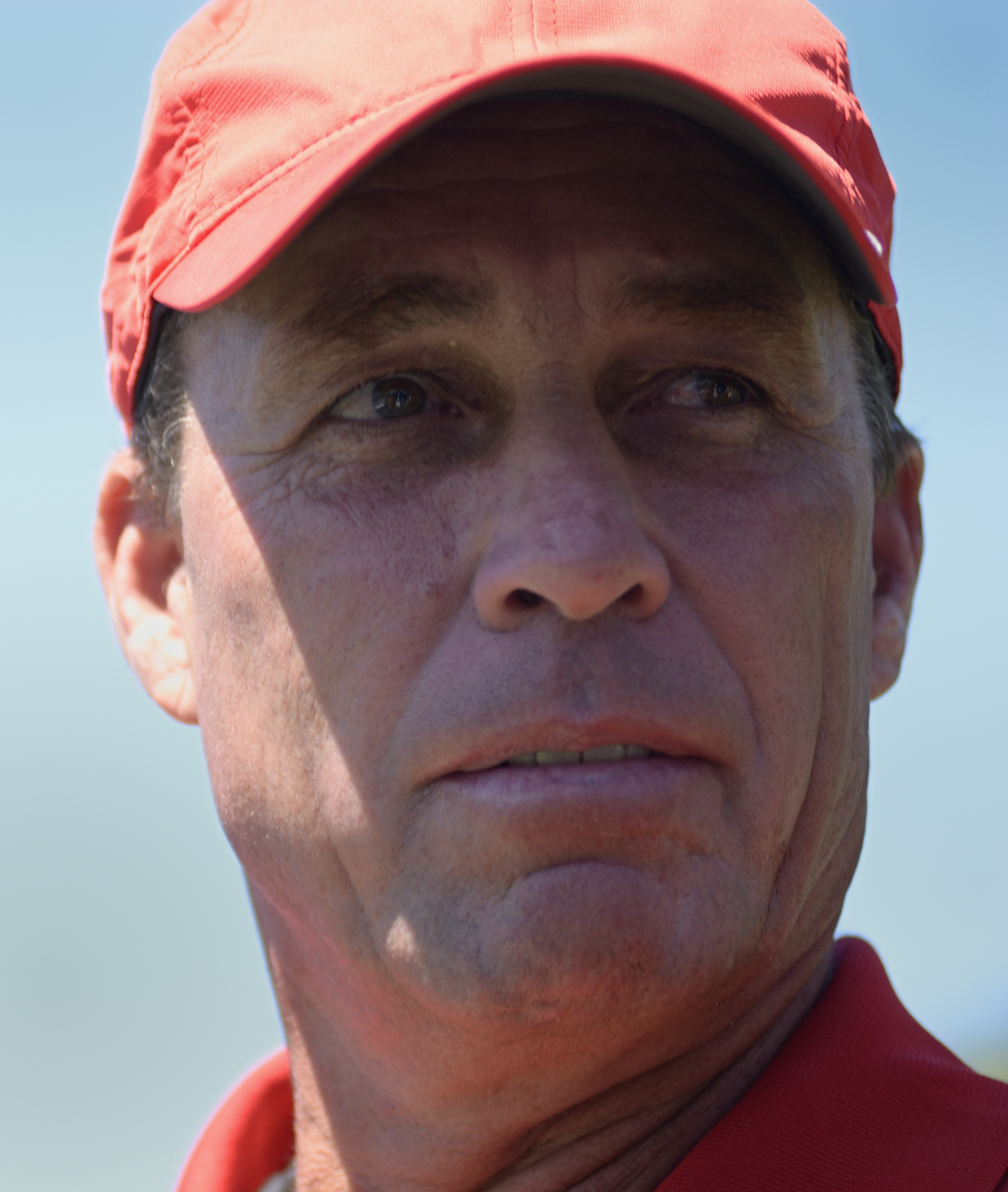
- Lendl reached most tour finals

Details
- Duration: 1 January 1983 – 1 May 1983
- Edition: 12th
- Tournaments: 8

Achievements (singles)
- Most titles: (Czechoslovakia) Ivan Lendl (United States) John McEnroe (2)
- Most finals: (Czechoslovakia) Ivan Lendl (3)

The 1983 World Championship Tennis circuit was one of the two rival professional male tennis circuits of 1983. It was organized by World Championship Tennis (WCT). The WCT circuit withdrew from the Grand Prix circuit in 1982 and established its own full calendar season consisting of 20 tournaments. For the 1983 season the WCT circuit was downsized to eight tournaments and ran from January to May.

== Calendar ==
Week	Tournament	Champion	Runner-up	Semifinalists	Quarterfinalists
1 Jan	Masters Doubles WCT, Great Britain; Carpet – $300,000 – D8	(Hungary) Balázs Taróczy (Switzerland) Heinz Günthardt; 6–3, 7–5, 7–6	(United States) Brian Gottfried (Mexico) Raúl Ramírez		
2 Feb	Richmond WCT; Richmond, Virginia, US; Carpet – $300,000 – S32/D16	(Argentina) Guillermo Vilas; 6–3, 7–5, 6–4	(United States) Steve Denton	(United States) Eliot Teltscher (South Africa) Kevin Curren	(United States) Roscoe Tanner (United States) Bill Scanlon (United States) Jeff Borowiak (United States) Brian Teacher
2 Feb	Richmond WCT; Richmond, Virginia, US; Carpet – $300,000 – S32/D16	(Czechoslovakia) Tomáš Šmíd (Czechoslovakia) Pavel Složil; 6–2, 6–4	(United States) Fritz Buehning (United States) Brian Teacher	(United States) Eliot Teltscher (South Africa) Kevin Curren	(United States) Roscoe Tanner (United States) Bill Scanlon (United States) Jeff Borowiak (United States) Brian Teacher
21 Feb	Delray Beach WCT; Delray Beach, Florida, US; Clay – $300,000 – S32/D16	(Argentina) Guillermo Vilas; 6–1, 6–4, 6–0	(Czechoslovakia) Pavel Složil	(United States) Eddie Dibbs (Argentina) Guillermo Vilas	(Sweden) Henrik Sundström (United States) Eric Fromm (United States) Johan Kriek (Brazil) Cássio Motta
21 Feb	Delray Beach WCT; Delray Beach, Florida, US; Clay – $300,000 – S32/D16	(Czechoslovakia) Tomáš Šmíd (Czechoslovakia) Pavel Složil; 7–6, 6–4	(India) Anand Amritraj (United States) Johan Kriek	(United States) Eddie Dibbs (Argentina) Guillermo Vilas	(Sweden) Henrik Sundström (United States) Eric Fromm (United States) Johan Kriek (Brazil) Cássio Motta
14 Mar	Munich WCT; Munich, Germany; Carpet – $300,000 – S32/D16	(United States) Brian Teacher; 1-6, 6–4, 6–2, 6–3	(United States) Mark Dickson	(Poland) Wojciech Fibak (United States) Bill Scanlon	(India) Ramesh Krishnan (United States) Vitas Gerulaitis (Israel) Shlomo Glickstein (South Africa) Kevin Curren
14 Mar	Munich WCT; Munich, Germany; Carpet – $300,000 – S32/D16	(United States) Steve Denton (South Africa) Kevin Curren; 7–5, 2-6, 6–1	(Switzerland) Heinz Günthardt (Hungary) Balázs Taróczy	(Poland) Wojciech Fibak (United States) Bill Scanlon	(India) Ramesh Krishnan (United States) Vitas Gerulaitis (Israel) Shlomo Glickstein (South Africa) Kevin Curren
4 Apr	Houston WCT; Houston, Texas, US; Clay – $250,000 – S32/D16	(Czechoslovakia) Ivan Lendl; 6–2, 6–0, 6–3	(Australia) Paul McNamee	(United States) Bill Scanlon (United States) Mark Dickson	(France) Henri Leconte (United States) Sammy Giammalva (United States) Steve Denton (Czechoslovakia) Tomáš Šmíd
4 Apr	Houston WCT; Houston, Texas, US; Clay – $250,000 – S32/D16	(United States) Steve Denton (South Africa) Kevin Curren; 7–6, 6–7, 6–1	(United States) Mark Dickson (Czechoslovakia) Tomáš Šmíd	(United States) Bill Scanlon (United States) Mark Dickson	(France) Henri Leconte (United States) Sammy Giammalva (United States) Steve Denton (Czechoslovakia) Tomáš Šmíd
12 Apr	Hilton Head WCT; Hilton Head, South Carolina, US; Clay – $250,000 – S8	(Czechoslovakia) Ivan Lendl; 6–2, 6–1, 6–0	(Argentina) Guillermo Vilas	(United States) Brian Teacher (Czechoslovakia) Tomáš Šmíd	(United States) Mark Dickson (United States) Steve Denton (United States) Bill Scanlon (Australia) Paul McNamee
26 Apr	Dallas WCT Finals; Dallas, Texas, US; Carpet – $300,000 – S16	(United States) John McEnroe; 6–2, 4–6, 6–3, 6–7^{(5–7)}, 7–6^{(7–0)}	(Czechoslovakia) Ivan Lendl	(United States) Bill Scanlon (United States) Vitas Gerulaitis	(United States) Steve Denton (South Africa) Kevin Curren (Argentina) Guillermo Vilas (Czechoslovakia) Tomáš Šmíd
1 May	WCT Tournament of Champions; Forest Hills, New York, US; Clay – $300,000 – S64/D32	(United States) John McEnroe; 6–3, 7–5	(United States) Vitas Gerulaitis	(United States) Johan Kriek (Argentina) Guillermo Vilas	(France) Henri Leconte (United States) Brad Gilbert (Australia) Paul McNamee (Czechoslovakia) Tomáš Šmíd
1 May	WCT Tournament of Champions; Forest Hills, New York, US; Clay – $300,000 – S64/D32	(United States) Tracy Delatte (United States) Johan Kriek; 6–7, 7–5, 6–3	(South Africa) Kevin Curren (United States) Steve Denton	(United States) Johan Kriek (Argentina) Guillermo Vilas	(France) Henri Leconte (United States) Brad Gilbert (Australia) Paul McNamee (Czechoslovakia) Tomáš Šmíd

== See also ==
- 1983 Grand Prix circuit
