= 1980 World Championship Tennis Finals – Singles =

Singles
- 1980 World Championship Tennis Finals

Final
- Champion: (United States) Jimmy Connors
- Runner-up: (United States) John McEnroe
- Score: 2–6, 7–6, 6–1, 6–2

Details
- Draw: 8
- Seeds: 2

Events
Singles
← 1979 ·	World Championship Tennis Finals	· 1981 →

John McEnroe was the defending champion but lost in the final 2–6, 7–6, 6–1, 6–2 to Jimmy Connors.

== Seeds ==
A champion seed is indicated in bold text while text in italics indicates the round in which that seed was eliminated.

1. (United States) John McEnroe (final)
2. (United States) **Jimmy Connors (champion)**

== Draw ==
=== Key ===
- Q = Qualifier
- WC = Wild card
- LL = Lucky loser
- Alt = Alternate
- ITF = ITF entry
- PR = Protected ranking
- SR = Special ranking
- SE = Special exempt
- JE = Junior exempt
- JR = Junior Accelerator Programme entrant
- CO = College Accelerator Programme entrant
- NG = Next Gen Accelerator Program entrant
- w/o = Walkover
- r = Retired
- d = Defaulted

Quarterfinals
1	(United States) **John McEnroe**	**6**	**6**	**6**
(Switzerland) Heinz Günthardt	2	1	0
(South Africa) **Johan Kriek**	**7**	**6**	**7**
(United States) John Sadri	5	4	5
(India) Vijay Amritraj	4	1	3
(Czechoslovakia) **Ivan Lendl**	**6**	**6**	**6**
(United States) Bill Scanlon	6	6	4
2	(United States) **Jimmy Connors**	**7**	**7**	**6**

Semifinals
1	(United States) **John McEnroe**	**6**	4	**7**	**6**
(South Africa) Johan Kriek	4	**6**	6	3
(Czechoslovakia) Ivan Lendl	4	5	3
2	(United States) **Jimmy Connors**	**6**	**7**	**6**

Final
1	(United States) John McEnroe	**6**	6	1	2
2	(United States) **Jimmy Connors**	2	**7**	**6**	**6**
