= 1980 WCT World Doubles =

- Date: January 2–6
- Edition: 8th
- Draw: 8D
- Surface: Carpet (i)
- Location: London, England
- Venue: Olympia

Champions

Doubles
- (United States) Brian Gottfried / (Mexico) Raúl Ramírez
| ← 1979 · | WCT World Doubles | · 1981 → |

The 1980 WCT World Doubles was a men's tennis tournament played on indoor carpet courts at Olympia in London, Great Britain that was part of the 1980 Volvo Grand Prix. It was the tour finals for the doubles season of the WCT Tour section. The tournament was held from January 2 through January 6, 1980.

== Final ==
=== Doubles ===
(United States) Brian Gottfried / (Mexico) Raúl Ramírez defeated (Poland) Wojtek Fibak / (Netherlands) Tom Okker 3–6, 6–4, 6–4, 3–6, 6–3

== See also ==
- 1980 World Championship Tennis Finals
