= 1979 World Championship Tennis Finals =

- Date: May 1–6
- Edition: 9th
- Category: Grand Prix
- Draw: 8S
- Prize money: $200,000
- Surface: Carpet / indoor
- Location: Dallas, TX, United States
- Venue: Moody Coliseum

Champions

Singles
- (United States) John McEnroe
← 1978 ·	WCT Finals	· 1980 →

The 1979 World Championship Tennis Finals was a men's professional tennis tournament played on indoor carpet courts. It was the 9th edition of the WCT Finals and was part of the 1979 Colgate-Palmolive Grand Prix. It was played at the Moody Coliseum in Dallas, Texas in the United States and was held from May 1 through May 6, 1979. Third-seeded John McEnroe won the title.

== Final ==
=== Singles ===
(United States) John McEnroe defeated (Sweden) Björn Borg 7–5, 4–6, 6–2, 7–6^{(7–5)}

- It was McEnroe's 5th singles title of the year and the 9th of his career.

== See also ==
- 1979 Colgate-Palmolive Masters
- 1979 WCT World Doubles
- Borg–McEnroe rivalry
