= 1977 WCT World Doubles =

- Date: May 4–8
- Edition: 5th
- Category: World Championship Tennis
- Draw: 8D
- Surface: Carpet / indoor
- Location: Kansas City, Missouri, U.S.
- Venue: Municipal Auditorium

Champions

Doubles
- (India) Vijay Amritraj / (United States) Dick Stockton
- WCT World Doubles

The 1977 WCT World Doubles was a men's tennis tournament played on indoor carpet courts at the Municipal Auditorium in Kansas City, Missouri, United States that was part of the 1977 World Championship Tennis circuit. It was the tour finals for the doubles season of the WCT Tour. It was the fifth edition of the tournament and was held from May 4 through May 8, 1977.

== Final ==
=== Doubles ===
(India) Vijay Amritraj / (United States) Dick Stockton defeated (United States) Vitas Gerulaitis / (Italy) Adriano Panatta 7–6, 7–6, 4–6, 6–3

== See also ==
- 1977 World Championship Tennis Finals
