= 1983 WCT World Doubles =

- Date: January 4–9
- Edition: 11th
- Surface: Carpet / indoor
- Location: Birmingham, England
- Venue: National Exhibition Centre

Champions

Doubles
- (Switzerland) Heinz Günthardt / (Hungary) Balázs Taróczy
- WCT World Doubles

The 1983 WCT World Doubles was a men's tennis tournament played on indoor carpet courts at National Exhibition Centre in Birmingham, England that was part of the 1983 World Championship Tennis circuit. It was the tour finals for the doubles season of the WCT Tour section. The tournament was held from January 4 through January 9, 1983.

== Final ==
=== Doubles ===
(Switzerland) Heinz Günthardt / (Hungary) Balázs Taróczy defeated (United States) Brian Gottfried / (Mexico) Raúl Ramírez 6–3, 7–5, 7–6

== See also ==
- 1983 World Championship Tennis Finals
