= 1981 World Championship Tennis Finals =

Tennis tournament

- Date: April 27 – May 3
- Edition: 11th
- Category: Grand Prix
- Draw: 8S
- Prize money: $250,000
- Surface: Carpet / indoor
- Location: Dallas, Texas, US
- Venue: Reunion Arena

Champions

Singles
- (United States) John McEnroe
← 1980 ·	WCT Finals	· 1982 →

The 1981 World Championship Tennis Finals was a men's tennis tournament played on indoor carpet courts. It was the 11th edition of the WCT Finals and was part of the 1981 Volvo Grand Prix. The tournament was played at the Reunion Arena in Dallas, Texas in the United States and was held from April 27 through May 3, 1981. The winners of the eight WCT tournaments that were part of the 1981 Grand Prix circuit qualified for the tournament augmented by the next best performers in the WCT points standings. Guillermo Vilas qualified by winning the last tournament held just before the WCT Finals, the River Oaks Tournament in Houston, but was unavailable to play. Jimmy Connors withdrew before the tournament due to gastroenteritis and Yannick Noah could not participate due to a shoulder injury. They were replaced by Sandy Mayer and Sam Giammalva respectively. First-seeded John McEnroe won the title and $100,000 prize money.

== Finals ==
=== Singles ===
(United States) John McEnroe defeated (South Africa) Johan Kriek 6–1, 6–2, 6–4

- It was McEnroe's 5th singles title of the year and the 29th of his career.

== Hall of Fame Classic ==
During the tournament a Hall of Fame Classic event was organized featuring four former Grand Slam tournament winners Ken Rosewall, Rod Laver, Roy Emerson and John Newcombe. Rosewall won the event, defeating Newcombe in the final 4–6, 7–6, 6–4.

== See also ==
- 1981 WCT World Doubles
