= 1984 WCT World Doubles – Doubles =

Doubles
- 1984 WCT World Doubles

Final
- Champions: (Czechoslovakia) Pavel Složil (Czechoslovakia) Tomáš Šmíd
- Runners-up: (Sweden) Anders Järryd (Sweden) Hans Simonsson
- Score: 1–6, 6–3, 3–6, 6–4, 6–3

Details
- Draw: 8
- WCT World Doubles

Heinz Günthardt and Balázs Taróczy were the defending champions.

Pavel Složil and Tomáš Šmíd won the title by defeating Anders Järryd and Hans Simonsson 1–6, 6–3, 3–6, 6–4, 6–3 in the final.

== Draw ==
Note: the first round is missing

Semifinals
3	(Sweden) Anders Järryd (Sweden) Hans Simonsson	6	7	5	7
(Australia) Mark Edmondson (United States) Sherwood Stewart	4	6	7	6
6	(Czechoslovakia) Pavel Složil (Czechoslovakia) Tomáš Šmíd	6	7	6	6
(United States) Peter Fleming (United States) Fritz Buehning	7	5	3	4

Final
3	(Sweden) Anders Järryd (Sweden) Hans Simonsson	6	3	6	4	3
6	(Czechoslovakia) Pavel Složil (Czechoslovakia) Tomáš Šmíd	1	6	3	6	6
