= 1985 Buick WCT Finals – Singles =

Singles
- 1985 Buick WCT Finals

Final
- Champion: (Czechoslovakia) Ivan Lendl
- Runner-up: (United States) Tim Mayotte
- Score: 7–6, 6–4, 6–1

Details
- Draw: 10
- Seeds: 4

Events
Singles
- Buick WCT Finals

John McEnroe was the defending champion but lost in the quarterfinals to Joakim Nyström.

Ivan Lendl won in the final 7–6, 6–4, 6–1 against Tim Mayotte.

== Seeds ==
A champion seed is indicated in bold text while text in italics indicates the round in which that seed was eliminated.

1. (United States) John McEnroe (quarterfinals)
2. (United States) Jimmy Connors (semifinals, retired)
3. (Czechoslovakia) **Ivan Lendl (champion)**
4. (Sweden) Mats Wilander (quarterfinals)

== Draw ==
Key

- Q = Qualifier
- WC = Wild card
- LL = Lucky loser
- Alt = Alternate
- ITF = ITF entry
- PR = Protected ranking
- SR = Special ranking
- SE = Special exempt
- JE = Junior exempt
- JR = Junior Accelerator Programme entrant
- CO = College Accelerator Programme entrant
- NG = Next Gen Accelerator Program entrant
- w/o = Walkover
- r = Retired
- d = Defaulted

First round
(Sweden) Henrik Sundström	3	3	4
(Sweden) **Joakim Nyström**	**6**	**6**	**6**
(Ecuador) Andrés Gómez	6	4	2
(United States) **Tim Mayotte**	**7**	**6**	**6**
(Sweden) Anders Järryd	**6**	2	2	**7**	3
(Sweden) **Stefan Edberg**	1	**6**	**6**	5	**6**
(United States) **Aaron Krickstein**	**7**	2	**6**	2	**7**
(United States) Eliot Teltscher	5	**6**	3	**6**	5

Quarterfinals
1	(United States) John McEnroe	4	6	3
(Sweden) **Joakim Nyström**	**6**	**7**	**6**
4	(Sweden) Mats Wilander	3	1	6
(United States) **Tim Mayotte**	**6**	**6**	**7**
(Sweden) Stefan Edberg	**6**	6	**6**	1	2
3	(Czechoslovakia) **Ivan Lendl**	3	**7**	3	**6**	**6**
(United States) Aaron Krickstein	5	2	3
2	(United States) **Jimmy Connors**	**7**	**6**	**6**

Semifinals
(Sweden) Joakim Nyström	4	**6**	2	5
(United States) **Tim Mayotte**	**6**	4	**6**	**7**
3	(Czechoslovakia) **Ivan Lendl**	**6**	2
2	(United States) Jimmy Connors	3	1^{r}

Final
(United States) Tim Mayotte	6	4	1
3	(Czechoslovakia) **Ivan Lendl**	**7**	**6**	**6**
