= 1982 World Championship Tennis Finals =

- Date: April 20–26
- Edition: 12th
- Category: World Championship Tennis
- Draw: 8S
- Prize money: $300,000
- Surface: Carpet / indoor
- Location: Dallas, Texas, United States
- Venue: Reunion Arena

Champions

Singles
- (Czechoslovakia) Ivan Lendl
← 1981 ·	WCT Finals	· 1983 →

The 1982 World Championship Tennis Spring Finals was a tennis tournament played on indoor carpet courts. It was the 12th edition of the WCT Finals and was part of the 1982 World Championship Tennis circuit since World Championship Tennis had split from the Grand Prix tennis circuit. It was played at the Reunion Arena in Dallas, Texas in the United States and was held from April 20 through April 26, 1982. Second-seeded Ivan Lendl won the title.

== Final ==
=== Singles ===
(Czechoslovakia) Ivan Lendl defeated (United States) John McEnroe 6–2, 3–6, 6–3, 6–3

- It was Lendl's 7th singles title of the year and the 24th of his career.

== See also ==
- 1982 WCT World Doubles
