= 1983 United Virginia Bank Classic =

- Date: February 7–13
- Edition: 18th
- Category: WCT
- Draw: 32S / 16D
- Prize money: $300,000
- Surface: Carpet / indoor
- Location: Richmond, Virginia, United States
- Venue: Robins Center (Note: The tournament had been held at the Richmond Coliseum since 1972 but it was not available after the 1983 tournament had been rescheduled from its original February 28 - March 6 date.)

Champions

Singles
- (Argentina) Guillermo Vilas

Doubles
- (Czechoslovakia) Pavel Složil / (Czechoslovakia) Tomáš Šmíd
- Richmond WCT

The 1983 United Virginia Bank Classic, also known as the Richmond WCT, was a men's tennis tournament played on indoor carpet courts at the Robins Center in Richmond, Virginia, United States. The event was part of 1983 World Championship Tennis circuit. It was the 18th edition of the tournament and was held from February 7 through February 13, 1983. Second-seeded Guillermo Vilas won the singles title and the $100,000 first-prize money.

== Finals ==
=== Singles ===
(Argentina) Guillermo Vilas defeated (United States) Steve Denton 6–3, 7–5, 6–4

- It was Vilas' first singles title of the year and the 60th of his career.

=== Doubles ===
(Czechoslovakia) Pavel Složil / (Czechoslovakia) Tomáš Šmíd defeated (United States) Fritz Buehning / (United States) Brian Teacher 6–2, 6–4
