= 1983 World Championship Tennis Finals =

1983 men's tennis tournament

- Date: April 26 – May 1
- Edition: 13th
- Category: World Championship Tennis
- Draw: 12S
- Prize money: $300,000
- Surface: Carpet / indoor
- Location: Dallas, Texas, United States
- Venue: Reunion Arena

Champions

Singles
- (United States) John McEnroe
← 1982 ·	WCT Finals	· 1984 →

The 1983 World Championship Tennis Finals was a men's tennis tournament played on indoor carpet courts. It was the 13th edition of the WCT Finals and was part of the 1983 World Championship Tennis circuit. It was played at the Reunion Arena in Dallas, Texas in the United States and was held from April 26 through May 1, 1983. Second-seeded John McEnroe won the title, his third at the tournament, and the accompanying $150,000 first-prize money after defeating defending champion Ivan Lendl in a five-set final that lasted 4 hours and 16 minutes.

== Final ==
=== Singles ===
(United States) John McEnroe defeated (Czechoslovakia) Ivan Lendl 6–2, 4–6, 6–3, 6–7^{(5–7)}, 7–6^{(7–0)}

- It was McEnroe's 2nd singles title of the year and the 41st of his career.

== See also ==
- 1983 WCT World Doubles
