= 1982 WCT World Doubles =

- Date: 5–10 January
- Edition: 10th
- Surface: Carpet / indoor
- Location: Birmingham Great Britain
- Venue: National Exhibition Centre

Champions

Doubles
- (Switzerland) Heinz Günthardt / (Hungary) Balázs Taróczy
- WCT World Doubles

The 1982 WCT World Doubles was a tennis tournament played on indoor carpet courts at National Exhibition Centre in Birmingham , Great Britain that was part of the 1982 World Championship Tennis circuit. It was the tour finals for the doubles season of the WCT Tour section. The tournament was held from January 5 through January 10, 1982.

== Final ==
=== Doubles ===
(Switzerland) Heinz Günthardt / (Hungary) Balázs Taróczy defeated (South Africa) Kevin Curren / (United States) Steve Denton 6–7, 6–3, 7–5, 6–4

== See also ==
- 1982 World Championship Tennis Finals
