= 1982 World Championship Tennis Finals – Singles =

Singles
- 1982 World Championship Tennis Finals

Final
- Champion: (Czechoslovakia) Ivan Lendl
- Runner-up: (United States) John McEnroe
- Score: 6–2, 3–6, 6–3, 6–3

Events
Singles
- World Championship Tennis Finals

John McEnroe was the defending champion but lost in the final 6–2, 3–6, 6–3, 6–3 to Ivan Lendl.

== Seeds ==
A champion seed is indicated in bold text while text in italics indicates the round in which that seed was eliminated.

1. (United States) John McEnroe (final)
2. (Czechoslovakia) **Ivan Lendl (champion)**

== Draw ==
Key

- Q = Qualifier
- WC = Wild card
- LL = Lucky loser
- Alt = Alternate
- ITF = ITF entry
- PR = Protected ranking
- SR = Special ranking
- SE = Special exempt
- JE = Junior exempt
- JR = Junior Accelerator Programme entrant
- CO = College Accelerator Programme entrant
- NG = Next Gen Accelerator Program entrant
- w/o = Walkover
- r = Retired
- d = Defaulted

Quarterfinals
1	(United States) **John McEnroe**	5	**6**	2	**7^{10}**	**6**
(United States) Bill Scanlon	**7**	4	**6**	6^{8}	4
(Czechoslovakia) Tomáš Šmíd	4	6^{5}	3
(United States) **Eddie Dibbs**	**6**	**7^{7}**	**6**
(Argentina) José Luis Clerc	**7^{7}**	2	2	**6**	4
(India) **Vijay Amritraj**	6^{4}	**6**	**6**	2	**6**
(Poland) Wojciech Fibak	1	4	**6**	6^{5}
2	(Czechoslovakia) **Ivan Lendl**	**6**	**6**	3	**7^{7}**

Semifinals
1	(United States) **John McEnroe**	**6**	**6**	**7^{9}**
(United States) Eddie Dibbs	4	4	6^{7}
(India) Vijay Amritraj	1	0	5
2	(Czechoslovakia) **Ivan Lendl**	**6**	**6**	**7**

Final
1	(United States) John McEnroe	2	**6**	3	3
2	(Czechoslovakia) **Ivan Lendl**	**6**	3	**6**	**6**
