= WCT World Doubles =

Tennis tournament

Masters Doubles WCT

Defunct tennis tournament
- Event name: Masters Doubles WCT
- Tour: WCT Tour
- Founded: 1973
- Abolished: 1986
- Editions: 14
- Surface: Carpet

The Masters Doubles WCT is a defunct WCT Tour affiliated men's tennis doubles tournament played from 1973 to 1986. It was held in various locations and was played on indoor carpet courts.

== Finals ==
Location	Year	Champions	Runners-up	Score
Montreal	1973	(United States) Robert Lutz (United States) Stan Smith	(Netherlands) Tom Okker (United States) Marty Riessen	6–2, 7–6^{(7–1)}, 6–0
Montreal	1974	(South Africa) Bob Hewitt (South Africa) Frew McMillan	(Australia) Owen Davidson (Australia) John Newcombe	6–2, 6–7^{(6–8)}, 6–1, 6–2
Mexico City	1975	(United States) Brian Gottfried (Mexico) Raúl Ramírez	(United Kingdom) Mark Cox (South Africa) Cliff Drysdale	7–6^{(8–6)}, 6–7^{(5–7)}, 6–2, 7–6^{(8–6)}
Kansas City	1976	(Poland) Wojciech Fibak (Germany) Karl Meiler	(United States) Robert Lutz (United States) Stan Smith	6–2, 2–6, 3–6, 6–3, 6–4
Kansas City	1977	(India) Vijay Amritraj (United States) Dick Stockton	(United States) Vitas Gerulaitis (Italy) Adriano Panatta	7–6, 7–6, 4–6, 6–3
Kansas City	1978	(Poland) Wojciech Fibak (Netherlands) Tom Okker	(United States) Robert Lutz (United States) Stan Smith	6–7, 6–4, 6–0, 6–3
London	1979	(United States) Peter Fleming (United States) John McEnroe	(Romania) Ilie Năstase (United States) Sherwood Stewart	3–6, 6–2, 6–3, 6–1
London	1980	(United States) Brian Gottfried (Mexico) Raúl Ramírez	(Poland) Wojciech Fibak (Netherlands) Tom Okker	3–6, 6–4, 6–4, 3–6, 6–3
London	1981	(Australia) Peter McNamara (Australia) Paul McNamee	(United States) Victor Amaya (United States) Hank Pfister	6–3, 2–6, 3–6, 6–3, 6–2
Birmingham	1982	(Switzerland) Heinz Günthardt (Hungary) Balázs Taróczy	(South Africa) Kevin Curren (United States) Steve Denton	6–7, 6–3, 7–5, 6–4
London	1983	(Switzerland) Heinz Günthardt (Hungary) Balázs Taróczy	(United States) Brian Gottfried (Mexico) Raúl Ramírez	6–3, 7–5, 7–6
London	1984	(Czechoslovakia) Pavel Složil (Czechoslovakia) Tomáš Šmíd	(Sweden) Anders Järryd (Sweden) Hans Simonsson	1–6, 6–3, 3–6, 6–4, 6–3
London	1985	(United States) Ken Flach (United States) Robert Seguso	(Switzerland) Heinz Günthardt (Hungary) Balázs Taróczy	6–3, 3–6, 6–3, 6–0
London	1986	(Switzerland) Heinz Günthardt (Hungary) Balázs Taróczy	(United States) Paul Annacone (South Africa) Christo van Rensburg	6–4, 1–6, 7–6^{(7–2)}, 6–7^{(6–8)}, 6–4

== See also ==
- WCT Finals
- World of Doubles
