= 1985 WCT World Doubles =

- Date: 1–6 January
- Edition: 13th
- Draw: 8
- Prize money: $200,000
- Surface: Carpet / indoor
- Location: London, England
- Venue: Royal Albert Hall

Champions

Doubles
- (United States) Ken Flach / (United States) Robert Seguso
- WCT World Doubles

The 1985 WCT World Doubles, also known by its sponsored name WCT Fuji Film World Doubles Championships, was a men's tennis tournament played on indoor carpet courts at Royal Albert Hall in London, England that was part of the 1985 Nabisco Grand Prix. It was the tour finals for the doubles season of the WCT Tour section. It consisted of the eight best performing doubles teams who competed in two round round robin groups followed by a semifinals and final play-off. It was the 13th edition of the tournament and was held from 1 January through 6 January 1985. Ken Flach and Robert Seguso won the title.

== Final ==
=== Doubles ===
(United States) Ken Flach / (United States) Robert Seguso defeated (Switzerland) Heinz Günthardt / (Hungary) Balázs Taróczy 6–3, 3–6, 6–3, 6–0

== See also ==
- 1985 World Championship Tennis Finals
