= 1979 World Championship Tennis Finals – Singles =

Singles
- 1979 World Championship Tennis Finals

Final
- Champion: (United States) John McEnroe
- Runner-up: (Sweden) Björn Borg
- Score: 7–5, 4–6, 6–2, 7–6

Events
Singles
- World Championship Tennis Finals

Vitas Gerulaitis was the defending champion but lost in the semifinals to Björn Borg.

John McEnroe won in the final 7–5, 4–6, 6–2, 7–6 against Borg.

== Seeds ==
A champion seed is indicated in bold text while text in italics indicates the round in which that seed was eliminated.

1. (United States) Jimmy Connors (semifinals)
2. (Sweden) Björn Borg (final)
3. (United States) **John McEnroe (champion)**
4. (United States) Brian Gottfried (quarterfinals)
5. (United States) Vitas Gerulaitis (semifinals)
6. (Australia) John Alexander (quarterfinals)
7. (United States) Gene Mayer (quarterfinals)
8. (Australia) Geoff Masters (quarterfinals)

== Draw ==
Key

- Q = Qualifier
- WC = Wild card
- LL = Lucky loser
- Alt = Alternate
- ITF = ITF entry
- PR = Protected ranking
- SR = Special ranking
- SE = Special exempt
- JE = Junior exempt
- JR = Junior Accelerator Programme entrant
- CO = College Accelerator Programme entrant
- NG = Next Gen Accelerator Program entrant
- w/o = Walkover
- r = Retired
- d = Defaulted

Quarterfinals
1	(United States) **Jimmy Connors**	6	**6**	**6**	**6**
7	(United States) Gene Mayer	**7**	1	4	1
3	(United States) **John McEnroe**	**6**	**6**	**6**
6	(Australia) John Alexander	4	0	2
5	(United States) **Vitas Gerulaitis**	**6**	**6**	**6**
4	(United States) Brian Gottfried	4	3	3
8	(Australia) Geoff Masters	3	1	1
2	(Sweden) **Björn Borg**	**6**	**6**	**6**

Semifinals
1	(United States) Jimmy Connors	1	4	4
3	(United States) **John McEnroe**	**6**	**6**	**6**
5	(United States) Vitas Gerulaitis	5	6	**6**	2
2	(Sweden) **Björn Borg**	**7**	**7**	2	**6**

Final
3	(United States) **John McEnroe**	**7**	4	**6**	**7**
2	(Sweden) Björn Borg	5	**6**	2	6
