= 1978 World Championship Tennis Finals =

- Date: May 9–14
- Edition: 8th
- Category: Grand Prix (WCT)
- Draw: 8S
- Prize money: $200,000
- Surface: Carpet / Indoor
- Location: Dallas, TX, United States
- Venue: Moody Coliseum

Champions

Singles
- (United States) Vitas Gerulaitis
- WCT Finals

The 1978 World Championship Tennis Finals was a men's tennis tournament played on indoor carpet courts. It was the 8th edition of the WCT Finals and was part of the 1978 Colgate-Palmolive Grand Prix, as the World Championship Tennis and the Grand Prix circuits were now combined. It was played at the Moody Coliseum in Dallas, Texas in the United States and was held from May 9 through May 14, 1978. Third-seeded Vitas Gerulaitis won the title and $100,000 first-prize money.

== Final ==
=== Singles ===
(United States) Vitas Gerulaitis defeated (United States) Eddie Dibbs 6–3, 6–2, 6–1

- It was Gerulaitis' 3rd title of the year and the 18th of his career.

== Prize money ==
Event	W	F	3rd	4th	QF
Singles	$100,000	$40,000	$20,000	$12,000	$7,000

== See also ==
- 1978 WCT World Doubles
