= 1985 Buick WCT Finals =

- Date: April 8–15
- Edition: 15th
- Category: Grand Prix
- Draw: 12S
- Prize money: $500,000
- Surface: Carpet / indoor
- Location: Dallas, TX, United States
- Venue: Reunion Arena

Champions

Singles
- (Czechoslovakia) Ivan Lendl
- WCT Finals

The 1985 Buick WCT Finals was a season-ending men's tennis tournament played on indoor carpet courts. It was the 15th edition of the WCT Finals and was part of the 1985 Nabisco Grand Prix, as the two organisations had reunited. It was played at the Reunion Arena in Dallas, Texas in the United States from April 8 through April 15, 1985. Third-seeded Ivan Lendl won the title.

== Final ==
=== Singles ===
(Czechoslovakia) Ivan Lendl defeated (United States) Tim Mayotte 7–6, 6–4, 6–1

- It was Lendl's 3rd singles title of the year and the 45th of his career.

== See also ==
- 1985 WCT World Doubles
