= 1979 WCT World Doubles =

- Date: January 3–7
- Edition: 7th
- Category: Grand Prix (WCT)
- Draw: 8D
- Prize money: $200,000
- Surface: Carpet (i)
- Location: London, England
- Venue: Olympia

Champions

Doubles
- (United States) Peter Fleming / (United States) John McEnroe
- WCT World Doubles

The 1979 WCT World Doubles, also known by its sponsored name Braniff Airways World Doubles Championship, was a men's tennis tournament played on indoor carpet courts at Olympia in London, England that was part of the 1979 Colgate-Palmolive Grand Prix. It was the tour finals for the doubles season of the WCT Tour section. The tournament was held from January 3 through January 7, 1979.

== Final ==
=== Doubles ===
(United States) Peter Fleming / (United States) John McEnroe defeated (Romania) Ilie Năstase / (United States) Sherwood Stewart 3–6, 6–2, 6–3, 6–1

== See also ==
- 1979 World Championship Tennis Finals
