= World Championship Tennis =

Men's professional tennis governing body

- Sport: Professional tennis
- Abbreviation: WCT
- Founded: 1968–1989
- Location: WCT Lakeway World of Tennis, Austin, Texas, United States
- Replaced: By ATP Tour in 1990

World Championship Tennis (WCT) was one of the principal organizing bodies of men's professional tennis headquartered at the WCT Lakeway World of Tennis facility, Austin, Texas, United States from 1968 to 1989. It administered the WCT Circuit a worldwide tour of associated tennis tournaments that was a rival tour to the ITF Grand Prix Circuit both of which were replaced by the Association of Tennis Professionals ATP Tour in 1990.

In 1968 (the first players signed a contract at the end of 1967). Players were ranked in a special WCT ranking according to their results in those tournaments.

The WCT had an important impact on the commercial development of tennis. It instituted a tie-breaker system, experimented the "no-ad" scoring system on 40–40 (called at times "sudden death") and outfitted players with colored clothing, a radical idea at that time. WCT also strongly encouraged the audience to cheer for players, rather than politely applaud, as the more staid tennis audiences had done before. They publicly emphasized their prize money structure and special bonus pool as an incentive to attract top players.

== History ==
World Championship Tennis (WCT) was founded in September 1967 by sports promoter David Dixon, who earlier witnessed the dreary conditions of the professional circuit before the open era when he visited a poorly promoted match between Rod Laver and Ken Rosewall. In August of that year, he had presented his idea of a pro tennis tour to Lamar Hunt and his nephew Al Hill Jr., who agreed to invest. WCT became the major professional tennis tour of players under contract of the early seventies.

After starting with the "Handsome Eight", the original eight players (Dennis Ralston, John Newcombe, Tony Roche, Cliff Drysdale, Earl Buchholz, Niki Pilić, Roger Taylor and Pierre Barthès), the first WCT tournament was held in January 1968 in Sydney, Australia and used the VASSS scoring system. According to sportswriter Rod Humphries, this first event was a hastily organized tournament held in the parking lot of the Channel 7 television studios in Epping and was won by Tony Roche. The first American WCT tournament was held in February 1968 in Kansas City, Missouri. In March 1968 Hunt and Hill took over Dixon's 50% stake in WCT and Dixon left the organization. WCT took a loss of $300,000 during its first year of operation. Al Hill, Jr. became president of WCT.

By early 1970, the WCT had signed other players (Marty Riessen, Ray Moore, Tom Okker, Arthur Ashe) and in July it acquired the player contracts of the rival professional organization, the National Tennis League (NTL), which had under contract players from the former professional group of Jack Kramer, namely Rod Laver, Ken Rosewall and Pancho Gonzáles as well as Andrés Gimeno, Roy Emerson, and Fred Stolle.

In 1971, the WCT circuit grew to 21 tournaments around the globe. In July 1971, at its annual meeting, the governing body International Lawn Tennis Federation (ILTF) voted to ban all WCT contract professionals from the ILTF tournaments and facilities from the beginning of 1972 onwards. At the end of the 1971 WCT season, the top eight players from the season were seeded according to their WCT rankings and played a year-end championship tournament in November. This was held about two weeks before the similar championship of the rival Grand Prix circuit, called The Masters. For commercial reasons, from 1972 onward this championship, played on indoor carpet, was usually held in the spring in Dallas, Texas and became known as the WCT Finals. The tournament ran for 19 years and the last championship was held in 1989. The format for this event was adopted by the Association of Tennis Professionals for the year-end Tour Finals.

In April 1972 an agreement was reached between the ILTF and WCT that divided the 1973 tour in a WCT circuit that ran from January through May and a Grand Prix circuit that was scheduled for the rest of the year. Under this agreement WCT players were again allowed to play the Grand Prix tournaments.

The WCT tour was merged into the Grand Prix tennis circuit in 1978. On 30 April 1981 WCT announced its withdrawal from the Grand Prix circuit and the establishment of its own full calendar season for 1982. According to Lamar Hunt the reasons for the withdrawal were the restrictions placed on them by the Men's Professional Council, the administrators of the Grand Prix circuit. In January 1983, WCT sued the Men's International Professional Tennis Council (MIPTC), the Association of Tennis Professionals and the ITF, claiming unfair restriction of trade. In November 1983 a settlement resulted in WCT's reincorporation into the Grand Prix with effect from 1985.

1989 was the last season of WCT. The ATP established its own tennis circuit from 1990. On August 28, 1990, after the Tournament of Champions event at Forest Hills, WCT announced its dissolution.

WCT also built and operated tennis clubs in the United States; WCT Lakeway World of Tennis in Lakeway (metro Austin), Texas and WCT Peachtree World of Tennis in Waycross (metro Atlanta), Georgia.

== WCT Circuit by season ==
See that page for WCT Circuit year by year tour

== WCT Year-end Championship Finals ==
The WCT Finals were usually held in Dallas. The 1971 quarterfinals and semifinals were played in Houston, and the final was played at the Memorial Auditorium in Dallas. The 1972–1979 editions were played at the Moody Coliseum, and the 1980–1989 tournaments at Reunion Arena in Dallas.

The first edition of the WCT Finals in 1971 was played in November, just a few days before The Masters, the equivalent of the WCT Finals for the rival Grand Prix circuit. Because of TV pressure, the second edition was held in May 1972 and most of the following editions were organized in between months of March and May. Nevertheless, in 1972 another edition, less important and with half the prize money, was held in November in Rome. The prize money offered to the winner, Arthur Ashe, was $25,000 compared to the $50,000 won by Ken Rosewall for the main edition in May.

A decade later there were three editions of the WCT Finals; the most important one in Dallas, and the others in autumn in Naples, Italy, and in winter (in January 1983) in Detroit, Michigan.

Year	Champion	Runner-up	Score
1971	(Australia) Ken Rosewall	(Australia) Rod Laver	6–4, 1–6, 7–6^{(7–3)}, 7–6^{(7–4)}
1972	(Australia) Ken Rosewall	(Australia) Rod Laver	4–6, 6–0, 6–3, 6–7, 7–6
1972 winter (Rome)	(United States) Arthur Ashe	(United States) Bob Lutz	6–2, 3–6, 6–3, 3–6, 7–6
1973	(United States) Stan Smith	(United States) Arthur Ashe	6–3, 6–3, 4–6, 6–4
1974	(Australia) John Newcombe	(Sweden) Björn Borg	4–6, 6–3, 6–3, 6–2
1975	(United States) Arthur Ashe	(Sweden) Björn Borg	3–6, 6–4, 6–4, 6–0
1976	(Sweden) Björn Borg	(Argentina) Guillermo Vilas	1–6, 6–1, 7–5, 6–1
1977	(United States) Jimmy Connors	(United States) Dick Stockton	6–7, 6–1, 6–4, 6–3
1978	(United States) Vitas Gerulaitis	(United States) Eddie Dibbs	6–3, 6–2, 6–1
1979	(United States) John McEnroe	(Sweden) Björn Borg	7–5, 4–6, 6–2, 7–6
1980	(United States) Jimmy Connors	(United States) John McEnroe	2–6, 7–6, 6–1, 6–2
1981	(United States) John McEnroe	(South Africa) Johan Kriek	6–1, 6–2, 6–4
1982	(Czech Republic) Ivan Lendl	(United States) John McEnroe	6–2, 3–6, 6–3, 6–3
1982 fall (Naples)	(Czech Republic) Ivan Lendl	(Poland) Wojciech Fibak	6–4, 6–2, 6–1
1982 winter (Detroit)	(Czech Republic) Ivan Lendl	(Argentina) Guillermo Vilas	7–5, 6–2, 2–6, 6–4
1983	(United States) John McEnroe	(Czech Republic) Ivan Lendl	6–2, 4–6, 6–3, 6–7, 7–6
1984	(United States) John McEnroe	(United States) Jimmy Connors	6–1, 6–2, 6–3
1985	(Czech Republic) Ivan Lendl	(United States) Tim Mayotte	7–6, 6–4, 6–1
1986	(Sweden) Anders Järryd	(West Germany) Boris Becker	6–7, 6–1, 6–1, 6–4
1987	(Czechoslovakia) Miloslav Mečíř	(United States) John McEnroe	6–0, 3–6, 6–2, 6–2
1988	(West Germany) Boris Becker	(Sweden) Stefan Edberg	6–4, 1–6, 7–5, 6–2
1989	(United States) John McEnroe	(United States) Brad Gilbert	6–3, 6–3, 7–6

== WCT final rankings by year ==
=== 1971 ===
1. (Australia) R. Laver
2. (Netherlands) T. Okker
3. (Australia) K. Rosewall
4. (South Africa) C. Drysdale
5. (United States) A. Ashe
6. (Australia) J. Newcombe
7. (United States) M. Riessen
8. (United States) B. Lutz
9. (Australia) R. Emerson
10. (Spain) A. Gimeno

=== 1972 ===
One ranking was issued for the second part of 1971 and first part of 1972, and another for the second part of 1972 final standings. The first eight players in the second ranking played the 1972 autumn-winter WCT Finals held in Rome.

Second part of 1971/first part of 1972

1. (Australia) R. Laver
2. (Australia) K. Rosewall
3. (Netherlands) T. Okker
4. (South Africa) C. Drysdale
5. (United States) M. Riessen
6. (United States) A. Ashe
7. (United States) B. Lutz
8. (Australia) J. Newcombe
9. = (Australia) R. Emerson
  = (Puerto Rico) C. Pasarell

Second part of 1972

1. (Australia) J. Newcombe
2. (United States) A. Ashe
3. (Netherlands) T. Okker
4. (United Kingdom) M. Cox
5. = (South Africa) C. Drysdale
  = (United States) M. Riessen
7. = (United States) B. Lutz
  = (Socialist Federal Republic of Yugoslavia) N. Pilić
9. = (Australia) R. Emerson
  = (Australia) T. Roche
  = (Egypt) I. El Shafei

=== 1973 ===
The players were separated into two groups, A & B, with each group playing certain tournaments. The top 4 from each group qualified for the final at the end of the season.

Group A

1. (United States) S. Smith
2. (Australia) R. Laver
3. = (Australia) R. Emerson
  = (Australia) J. Alexander
5. (United States) C. Richey
6. (United States) D. Stockton
7. (United States) B. Lutz
8. (United States) B. Gottfried
9. (Australia) C. Dibley
10. (Chile) J. Fillol

Group B

1. (Australia) K. Rosewall
2. (United States) A. Ashe
3. (United States) M. Riessen
4. = (United Kingdom) R. Taylor
  = (United Kingdom) M. Cox
6. (New Zealand) B. Fairlie
7. (Czechoslovakia) J. Kodeš
8. (Netherlands) T. Okker
9. (United States) R. Tanner
10. (United States) T. Gorman

=== 1974 ===
The group was divided into three groups, Red, Blue, and Green and the top 8 points winners qualified for the final (marked with*): 2 players by group plus the other two players having most points. Each group played separate tournaments except the Philadelphia tournament at the start of the season.

Red group

1. (Romania) I. Năstase*
2. (Netherlands) T. Okker*
3. (United States) T. Gorman
4. (South Africa) C. Drysdale
5. (Socialist Federal Republic of Yugoslavia) N. Pilić
6. (South Africa) A. Pattison
7. (Australia) J. Alexander
8. (United States) M. Riessen
9. (Australia) T. Roche
10. (South Africa) F. McMillan

Blue group

1. (Australia) J. Newcombe*
2. (United States) S. Smith*
3. (Soviet Union) A. Metreveli
4. (United States) D. Stockton
5. (Czechoslovakia) J. Hřebec
6. (United States) J. Borowiak
7. (Australia) R. Case
8. (Mexico) R. Ramírez
9. (Chile) J. Fillol
10. (United States) C. Richey

Green group

1. (United States) A. Ashe*
2. (Australia) R. Laver*
3. (Sweden) B. Borg*
4. (Czechoslovakia) J. Kodeš*
5. (United Kingdom) M. Cox
6. (United States) R. Tanner
7. (United States) E. Dibbs
8. (United Kingdom) R. Taylor
9. (Italy) A. Panatta
10. (Australia) O. Parun

=== 1975 ===
The group was divided into three groups again, Red, Blue, and Green and the top 8 points winners qualified for the final (marked with *). Each group played separate tournaments except the Philadelphia tournament at the start of the season.

Red group

1. (Australia) J. Alexander*
2. (United States) H. Solomon*
3. (United Kingdom) M. Cox*
4. (United States) S. Smith
5. (United States) D. Stockton
6. (United States) B. Lutz
7. (Australia) P. Dent
8. (South Africa) C. Drysdale
9. = (India) V. Amritraj
  = (United States) M. Riessen

Blue group

1. (Australia) R. Laver*
2. (United States) R. Tanner*
3. (Mexico) R. Ramírez*
4. (United States) B. Gottfried
5. (United States) V. Gerulaitis
6. (Chile) J. Fillol
7. (Australia) A. Stone
8. (South Africa) A. Pattison
9. = (United States) J. Borowiak
  = (Egypt) I. El Shafei

Green group

1. (United States) A. Ashe*
2. (Sweden) B. Borg*
3. (Netherlands) T. Okker
4. (United Kingdom) B. Mottram
5. (South Africa) B. Hewitt
6. (Australia) O. Parun
7. (Australia) K. Warwick
8. (Spain) J. Higueras
9. (France) P. Dominguez
10. (Australia) B. Giltinan

1976–1983: All the players were put back together and played the same tournaments.

=== 1976 ===
1. (United States) A. Ashe
2. (Mexico) R. Ramírez
3. (Argentina) G. Vilas
4. (United States) E. Dibbs
5. (Sweden) B. Borg
6. (United States) D. Stockton
7. (United States) B. Lutz
8. (United States) H. Solomon
9. (United States) V. Gerulaitis
10. (United States) B. Gottfried

=== 1977 ===
1. (United States) D. Stockton
2. (United States) E. Dibbs
3. (United States) J. Connors
4. (Romania) I. Năstase
5. = (South Africa) C. Drysdale
  = (Poland) W. Fibak
  = (United States) V. Gerulaitis
8. (Italy) A. Panatta
9. (Italy) C. Barazzutti
10. = (United States) H. Solomon
  = (Australia) K. Rosewall

=== 1978 ===
1. (United States) V. Gerulaitis
2. (Sweden) B. Borg
3. (United States) E. Dibbs
4. (Mexico) R. Ramírez
5. (Romania) I. Năstase
6. (United States) S. Mayer
7. = (United States) J. Connors
  = (United States) B. Gottfried
9. (United States) D. Stockton
10. (Italy) C. Barazzutti

=== 1979 ===
1. (United States) J. McEnroe
2. (Sweden) B. Borg
3. (United States) V. Gerulaitis
4. (United States) J. Connors
5. (United States) R. Tanner
6. (United States) G. Mayer
7. = (United States) A. Ashe
  = (Argentina) G. Vilas
9. (Australia) G. Masters
10. = (Australia) J. Alexander
  = (United States) B. Gottfried
  = (Romania) I. Năstase

=== 1980 ===
1. (United States) J. McEnroe
2. (United States) B. Scanlon
3. (United States) J. Connors
4. = (Czechoslovakia) I. Lendl
  = (United States) R. Tanner
6. = (Switzerland) H. Günthardt
  = (India) V. Amritraj
8. = (United States) J. Sadri
  = (Argentina) J. L. Clerc
10. = (United States) B. Gottfried
  = (United States) G. Mayer

=== 1981 ===
1. (United States) R. Tanner
2. (United States) J. Connors
3. (Poland) W. Fibak
4. (France) Y. Noah
5. (United States) J. McEnroe
6. (India) V. Amritraj
7. (United States) B. Gottfried
8. (United States) V. Gerulaitis
9. (United States) S. Mayer
10. (United States) G. Mayer

=== 1982 ===
WCT expanded from the previous year and broke away from the Grand Prix for the year. There were three finals, Spring (Dallas) the most important one, Fall (Naples, Italy) and Winter (Detroit) and therefore three different points tables for each season:

Spring

1. (Czechoslovakia) I. Lendl
2. (Argentina) J. L. Clerc
3. (Poland) W. Fibak
4. (India) V. Amritraj
5. (Czechoslovakia) T. Šmíd
6. (Australia) P. McNamara
7. (United States) J. McEnroe
8. (United States) V. Gerulaitis
9. (Hungary) B. Taróczy
10. (United States) E. Dibbs

Summer/Fall

1. (Czechoslovakia) I. Lendl
2. (Czechoslovakia) T. Šmíd
3. (Argentina) J. L. Clerc
4. (Argentina) G. Vilas
5. (South Africa) J. Kriek
6. (Spain) J. Higueras
7. = (Switzerland) H. Günthardt
  = (Poland) W. Fibak
9. (United States) R. Tanner
10. (United States) L. Bourne

Winter

1. (Poland) W. Fibak
2. (United States) B. Scanlon
3. = (South Africa) K. Curren
  = (Argentina) G. Vilas
5. (Hungary) B. Taróczy
6. (Australia) P. McNamee
7. = (Czechoslovakia) I. Lendl
  = (United States) B. Teacher
9. = (United States) To. Gullikson
  = (Czechoslovakia) T. Šmíd

=== 1983 ===
There were only 9 tournaments and the WCT were back with the Grand Prix circuit.

1. (Czechoslovakia) I. Lendl
2. (United States) J. McEnroe
3. (Argentina) G. Vilas
4. (United States) V. Gerulaitis
5. (Argentina) J. L. Clerc
6. (Australia) P. McNamee
7. (Czechoslovakia) T. Šmíd
8. (Poland) W. Fibak
9. (Hungary) B. Taróczy
10. (United States) B. Scanlon

== WCT Challenge Cup ==
Some special events such as the Aetna World Cup (where the Australian pros and the US pros faced in a team event because in 1970, at the start of this event, contract pro players weren't allowed to enter the Davis Cup) or the Challenge Cup (an 8-man tournament) were held by the WCT organization.

=== List of WCT Challenge Cup winners ===
- 1976 – Honolulu – Ilie Năstase defeated Arthur Ashe, 6–3, 1–6, 6–7, 6–3, 6–1
- 1976/7 – Las Vegas – Ilie Năstase defeated Jimmy Connors, 3–6, 7–6, 6–4, 7–5
- 1977 – Las Vegas – Jimmy Connors defeated Roscoe Tanner, 6–2, 5–6, 3–6, 6–2, 6–5
- 1978 – Montego Bay – Ilie Năstase defeated Peter Fleming, 2–6, 5–6, 6–2, 6–4, 6–4
- 1979 – Montreal – Björn Borg defeated Jimmy Connors, 6–4, 6–2, 2–6, 6–4
- 1980 – Montreal – John McEnroe defeated Vijay Amritraj, 6–1, 6–2, 6–

== See also ==
- Grand Prix tennis circuit
- History of tennis
- WCT Circuit
