= Jimmy Connors =

American tennis player (born 1952)

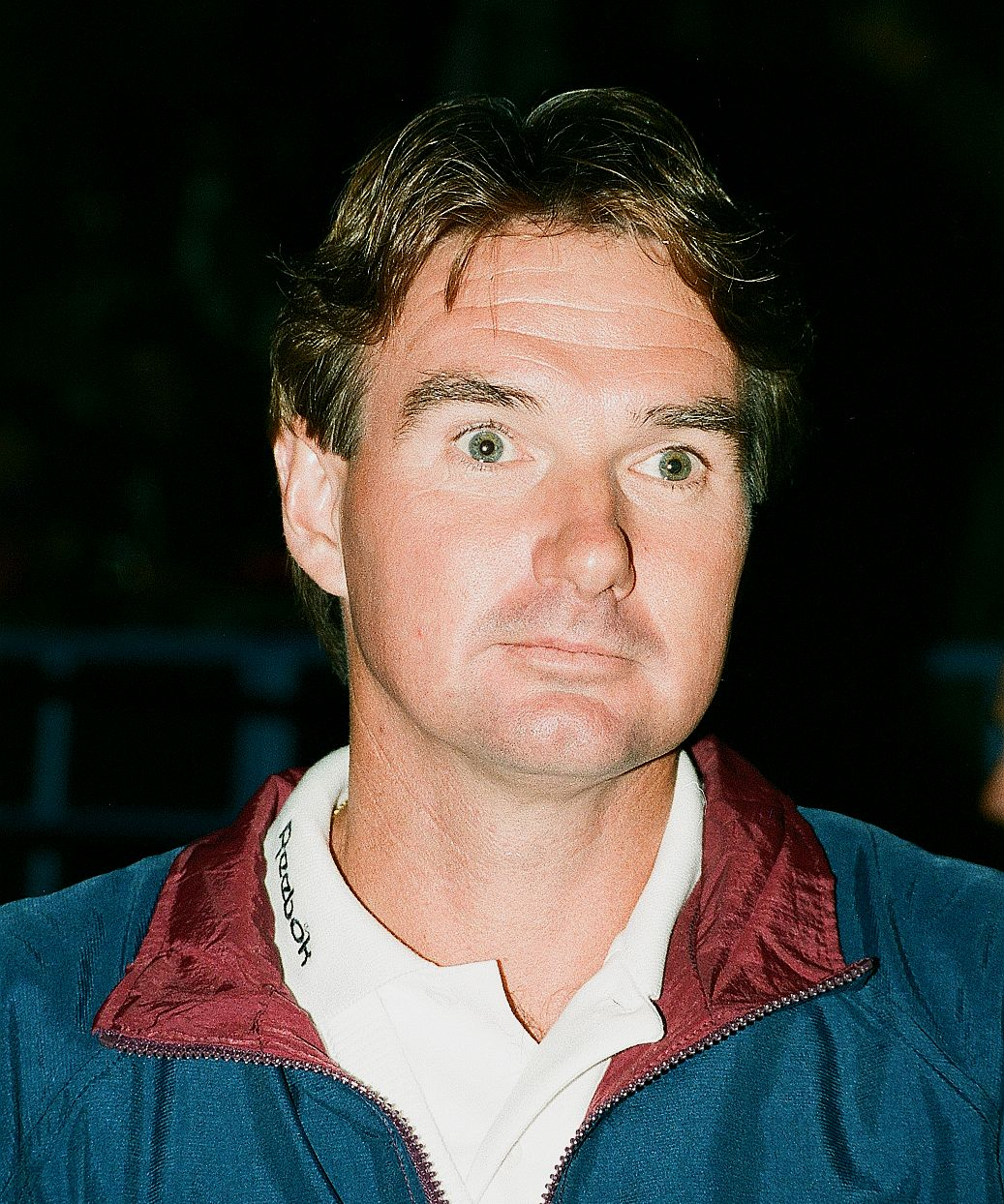
- Connors in 1994
- Full name: James Scott Connors
- Country (sports): United States
- Residence: Santa Barbara, California, US
- Born: September 2, 1952 (age 74) East St. Louis, Illinois, US
- Height: 5 ft 10 in (1.78 m)
- Turned pro: 1972
- Retired: 1996
- Plays: Left-handed (two-handed backhand)
- Coach: Gloria Connors; Pancho Segura
- Prize money: US$8,641,040
- Int. Tennis HoF: 1998 (member page)

Singles
- Career record: 1274–283 (81.8%)
- Career titles: 109 (1st in the Open Era)
- Highest ranking: No. 1 (July 29, 1974)

Grand Slam singles results
- Australian Open: W (1974)
- French Open: SF (1979, 1980, 1984, 1985)
- Wimbledon: W (1974, 1982)
- US Open: W (1974, 1976, 1978, 1982, 1983)

Other tournaments
- Tour Finals: W (1977)
- Grand Slam Cup: 1R (1991)
- WCT Finals: W (1977, 1980)

Doubles
- Career record: 174–78 (68.9%)
- Career titles: 16
- Highest ranking: No. 7 (1 March 1976)

Grand Slam doubles results
- Australian Open: 3R (1974)
- French Open: F (1973)
- Wimbledon: W (1973)
- US Open: W (1975)

Team competitions
- Davis Cup: W (1981)

Coaching career (2006–2015)
- Andy Roddick (2006–2008) Maria Sharapova (2013)

James Scott Connors (born September 2, 1952) is an American former professional tennis player as well as an author, a tennis commentator, and a coach. He was ranked as the world No. 1 in men's singles by the Association of Tennis Professionals (ATP) for 268 weeks (fifth-most of all time), and finished as the year-end No. 1 five times. Known for his fiery competitiveness, Connors holds three prominent Open Era men's singles records: 109 titles, 1,557 matches played, and 1,274 match wins. His titles include eight singles majors (an Open Era joint-record five US Opens, two Wimbledons, and one Australian Open) and three year-end championships. In 1974, he became the second man in the Open Era to win three major titles in a calendar year; he was not permitted to participate in the fourth, the French Open. His playing career ended in 1996.

== Early life ==
Born September 2, 1952, Connors grew up in East St. Louis, Illinois, just across the Mississippi River from St. Louis, Missouri. He was raised Catholic. During his childhood, he was coached and trained by his mother Gloria and grandmother Bertha. His father, Jim Connors, was a toll bridge operator. His paternal grandfather, John Connors, was the mayor of East St. Louis from 1939 to 1951. The family moved to Belleville around 1963.

Connors played in his first U.S. Championship, the U.S. boys' 11-and-under of 1961, when he was nine years old. Connors's mother took him to Southern California to be coached by Pancho Segura in 1968; however, she remained his coach and manager. He and his brother, John "Johnny" Connors, attended St. Phillip's grade school. Connors won the Junior Orange Bowl in both the 12- and the 14-year categories.

== Career ==
=== 1970–1971 ===
In August 1970, Connors recorded his first match win in the first round of the Haverford tournament, beating Jean-Baptiste Chanfreau. In his first US Open, Connors lost in round one to Mark Cox. At Pacific Southwest Open in Los Angeles, he defeated Roy Emerson before losing to Clark Graebner in the last 16, where he was described by the Los Angeles Times as the "Cinderfella of tennis" and "the kid with a magic wand for a backhand". In 1971, Connors won the NCAA singles title as a Freshman while attending UCLA and attained All-American status. He reached his first ATP Tour finals at Columbus (losing to Tom Gorman) and Los Angeles (beating newly crowned US Open champion Stan Smith before losing to 43 year old Pancho Gonzales).

=== 1972–1973 ===
Connors turned professional in 1972 and won his first tournament, the Jacksonville Open, quickly followed by his second at Roanoke, third at Queen's Club, fourth at Columbus, fifth at the Cincinnati Open and sixth at Albany. Connors was acquiring a reputation as a maverick in 1972 when he refused to join the newly formed Association of Tennis Professionals (ATP), the union that was embraced by most male professional players, in order to play in and dominate a series of smaller tournaments organized by Bill Riordan, his manager. At Wimbledon, where WCT pros were banned, Connors reached the quarter finals before losing to Ilie Nastase in straight sets. Connors won the 1973 U.S. Pro, defeating Arthur Ashe in a five-set final, one of 11 tournaments Connors won that year. Because he was not a member of the ATP, he did not boycott Wimbledon 1973 and reached the quarter finals, losing in four sets to Alex Metreveli in a match in which Connors "failed badly with volleys". Newcombe remarked that Connors's weak point was his volley and said "I felt I was on top of Jimmy's best weapon, his return of serve" after beating Connors in straight sets in the US Open quarter finals.

=== 1974 ===
Connors had a 93–4 record in 1974 and won 15 tournaments of the 21 he entered, including three of the four Grand Slam singles titles. Connors won the Australian Open, which began in late December 1973 and concluded on January 1, 1974, defeating Phil Dent in a "dour" four-set final. He beat Ken Rosewall in straight sets in the final of Wimbledon, losing just six games. He allowed Rosewall just two games in the US Open final in the most one-sided men's singles final in the tournament's history. "From the moment I took the court and hit the first ball, I felt I was gliding. I was on a cloud. It was a terrific feeling” said Connors afterwards. Connors was the second man in the Open Era to win three Grand Slams in a calendar year. Connors did not participate in the French Open during his peak years (1974–78), as he was banned from playing by the event in 1974 due to his association with World Team Tennis (WTT) and in the other four years chose not to participate. His exclusion from the French Open denied him the opportunity to become the second male player of the Open era, after Rod Laver, to win all four major singles titles in a calendar year. Connors is one of thirteen men to win three or more major singles titles in a calendar year. He chose not to participate in the season-ending Masters Cup between the top eight players of the world and was not eligible for the World Championship Tennis (WCT) finals because he did not compete in the WCT's regular tournaments. Connors finished 1974 at the top of ATP Point Rankings. He also was the recipient of the Martini and Rossi Award, voted for by a panel of journalists and was ranked world No. 1 by Rex Bellamy, Tennis Magazine (U.S.), Rino Tommasi, World Tennis, Bud Collins, Judith Elian and Lance Tingay.

=== 1975 ===
Connors reached the finals of Wimbledon (losing in four sets to Arthur Ashe), the US Open (where Manuel Orantes "destroyed Connors' usually furious attacking game with popcorn balls") and the Australian Open (losing 9–7 on a fourth set tie break to John Newcombe). He never played in the Australian Open again. He won nine of the tournaments he entered achieving an 82–8 record. While he earned enough points to retain the ATP No. 1 ranking the entire year and was ranked number one by Rino Tommasi, all other tennis authorities, including the ATP, named Arthur Ashe, who defeated Connors at Wimbledon, as the Player of the Year. He once again did not participate in the Masters Cup or the WCT Finals.

=== 1976 ===
Connors lost in the quarterfinals at Wimbledon to Roscoe Tanner. At the US Open, Connors captured the title once again (defeating Björn Borg). After the match, Borg said “it was a very good match. It was the best Jimmy has ever played against me. He hit everything on the lines, everything in the corners. I couldn't do anything. Usually, you play like that for one and a half sets and start missing. But he was very consistent." He won 12 events, including the U.S. Pro Indoor in Philadelphia, Palm Springs and Las Vegas, he achieved a record of 90–8 and defeated Borg all four times they played. He was ranked No. 1 by the ATP for the entire year and was ranked number one by World Tennis, Tennis Magazine (U.S.), Bud Collins, Lance Tingay, and Tommasi. The ATP named Borg as its Player of the Year.

=== 1977 ===
At Wimbledon 1977, playing with an injured right thumb, Connors lost in the final to Borg 6–4 in the fifth set. In the US Open final on a windy day Connors lost in four sets to Guillermo Vilas (it was the only match in the tournament to go beyond three sets). Connors captured both the Masters (beating Borg in the final) and the WCT Finals (over Dick Stockton in the final). While Connors held on to the ATP No. 1 ranking, World Tennis Magazine and other sources ranked Borg or Vilas No. 1. Connors won eight tournaments that year.

=== 1978 ===
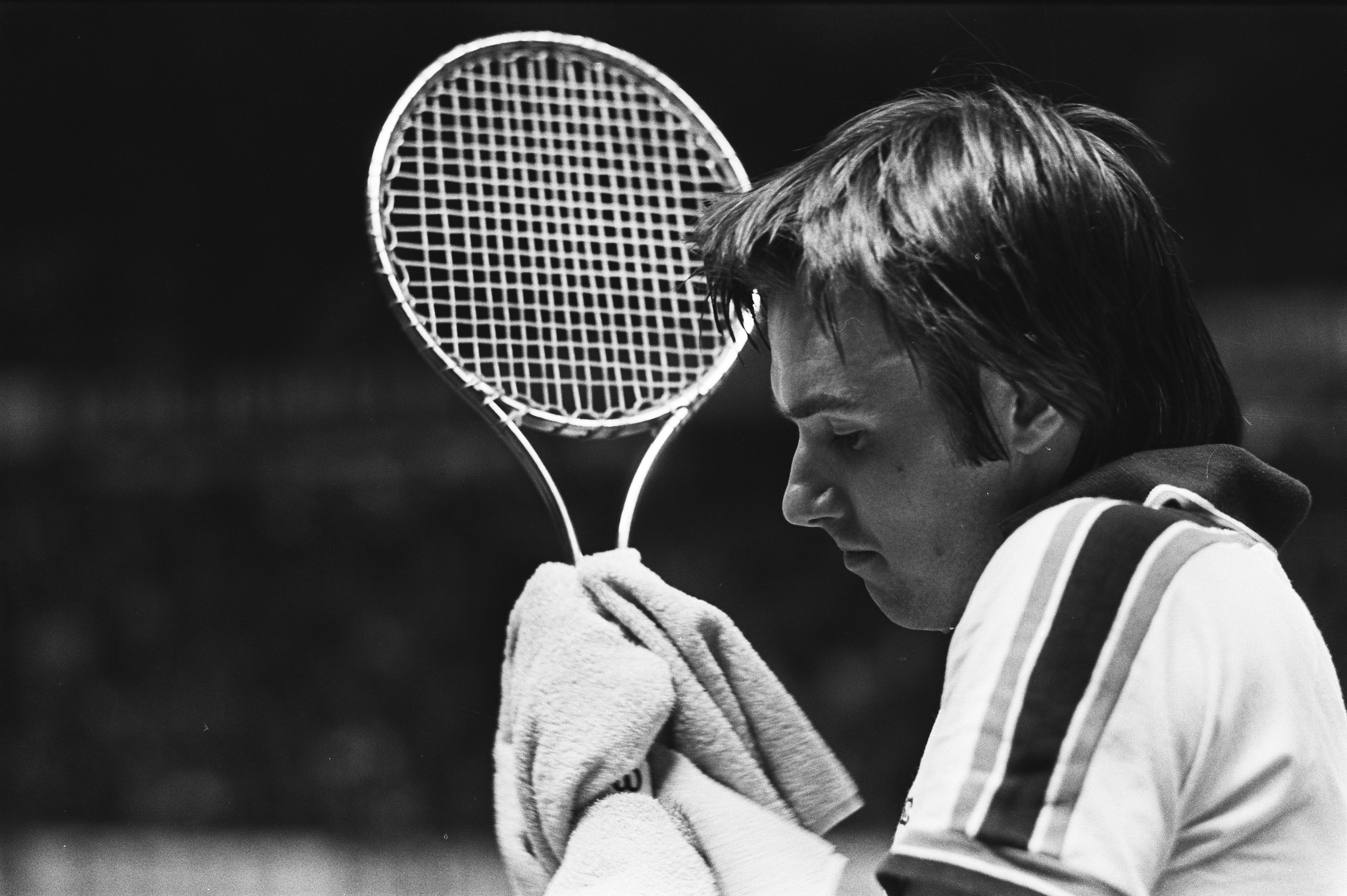
Connors at the 1978 ABN Tennis Tournament holding his Wilson T2000 steel racket

In the Wimbledon final against Borg, Connors "seemed dispirited throughout the match and played without his usual animation", as he lost in straight sets. Connors defeated Borg in the US Open final (played on hardcourt for the inaugural time). The Los Angeles Times described the match by saying "Connors played smashingly, as he has all tournament, pressuring Borg from the start. Yet Borg looked nothing like the broad-shouldered, power-hitting Swede who dominated Connors in straight sets at Wimbledon." Borg was suffering from an infected callous on his thumb but said "it was little bit tender earlier today, but it did not bother me during the match. Jimmy was just too good today." Connors reached the final of the US Open in five straight years from 1974 through 1978, winning three times with each win being on a different surface (1974 on grass, 1976 on clay and 1978 on hard). Connors won ten tournaments in 1978, including the U.S. Pro Indoor. While he retained the ATP No. 1 ranking at the end of the year, the ATP and most tennis authorities rated Borg, who also won the French Open, as the player of the year.

Connors reached the ATP world No. 1 ranking on July 29, 1974 and held it for 160 consecutive weeks, a record until it was surpassed by Roger Federer on February 26, 2007. Connors was the year-end No. 1 player from 1974 through 1978 and held the No. 1 ranking for a total of 268 weeks during his career. Connors relinquished his initial grip (160 weeks) on the No. 1 ranking for only one week, from August 23 to 30, 1977, before resuming as No. 1 for another 84 weeks.

=== 1979 ===
At the French Open, he lost in the semi finals in four sets to Victor Pecci. "He's just clubbing the ball, hitting it with everything he's got" said Connors afterwards. At Wimbledon, Connors lost in the semi finals in straight sets to Borg. At the US Open, Connors lost in the semi finals in straight sets to John McEnroe, making 62 unforced errors. He reached the semifinals at the Masters (losing to Gerulaitis for the first time since 1972). Afterwards Gerulaitis said "nobody beats Vitas Gerulaitis 17 times in a row!" Connors won eight tournaments in 1979.

=== 1980 ===
Gerulaitis played a "patient clay court game" to beat Connors in five sets in the French Open semi finals. At Wimbledon, Connors lost in four sets to McEnroe in the semi finals when McEnroe's antics caused the two men to clash: "Keep your mouth shut out here" shouted Connors to his opponent. At the US Open the two men met again in the semi finals. It was described as "one of the finest and most spectacular contests in history" and once again McEnroe's temper was on display as he called the umpire "Mr. Incompetent" and at one stage was angrily disputing a call and let go of his racket, which sailed over Connors's head (McEnroe claimed it was "accidental"). McEnroe won on a fifth set tie break. He reached the semi finals of the 1980 Masters (losing his eighth consecutive match to Borg), but he did win the WCT Finals in 1980, beating McEnroe in four sets in the final. He won six tournaments in 1980.

=== 1981 ===
Despite leading 2 sets to 1 and 2–0 in the fourth set, Connors lost in five sets to José Luis Clerc in the quarter finals of the French Open. Connors lost his tenth consecutive match to Borg in the Wimbledon semi finals, despite winning the first two sets. At the US Open, Borg served 14 aces in 15 service games and beat Connors in straight sets in the semi finals. He won four tournaments in 1981, including a five set victory over McEnroe in the final of the Wembley championships in which McEnroe was fined for whacking a microphone with his racket.

=== 1982 ===
At the French Open, Connors lost in the quarter finals to José Higueras in straight sets. Higueras was "content to let his opponent try to force the pace and thereby make errors". Connors won his second Wimbledon, defeating John McEnroe in five close sets "that varied from boringly slow to fiercely brilliant". Connors beat Ivan Lendl in the US Open final when Lendl was unable to cope "with Connors' penetrating, sharply-angled groundstrokes into the corners, or his net-charging attacks". After the US Open, Connors reclaimed the ATP No. 1 ranking. He also reached the semifinal of the Masters Cup and won five other tournaments for a total of seven. After trading the number-one ranking back and forth with McEnroe, he finished the year ranked No. 2 in points earned, but he was named Player of the Year by the ATP and was ITF World Champion.

=== 1983 ===
In 1983, Connors, McEnroe and Lendl traded the No. 1 ranking several times. At the French Open, Christophe Roger-Vasselin targeted Connors's forehand and the Frenchman won their quarter final in straight sets. At Wimbledon, Kevin Curren served 33 aces in beating Connors in four sets on Court No. 2, a court renowned for upsets. Connors won the US Open for a record fifth time beating Lendl in the final in four sets, where he "blunted Lendl's power with defensive strength and spectacular volleys". It was his 100th tournament victory and fourth of the year. He finished the year as the No. 3 ranked player.

=== 1984 ===
Connors reached the final of WCT Finals (winning six games in three sets against McEnroe). At the French Open, Connors lost in straight sets in the semi finals to McEnroe, the first time McEnroe had beaten Connors on clay. McEnroe's temper was once again on display. He was fined for verbal abuse and got into an argument with Connors after Jimmy rubbed away a ball mark. At Wimbledon the two men met again in the final. Connors lost for the sixth consecutive time to McEnroe on a very hot day when Connors won just four games. He reached the semifinals of the US Open (losing to McEnroe in five sets) and the Masters (losing to Lendl). He won five tournaments and finished the year as the No. 2 ranked player after McEnroe.

=== 1985–1986 ===
In 1985, Connors made the semifinals of the French Open, but struggled with the wind and slow clay in losing in straight sets to Lendl. At Wimbledon, Kevin Curren "bewildered" Connors, allowing him just five games in their semi final. At the US Open, Connors was hampered by a sprained ankle sustained in practice earlier that day and lost to Lendl in straight sets in the semi finals. He ended 1985 ranked No. 4. At Wimbledon 1986, Connors lost in the opening round to Robert Seguso. At the US Open, Connors lost in straight sets in the third round to Todd Witsken. After the match, Witsken said "several years ago guys in my position never would feel they could beat Connors. But now he's getting older and the guys realize he's beatable, that we have a chance".

=== 1987–1988 ===
Connors lost to Boris Becker in the 1987 French Open quarter finals in straight sets. In the fourth round of Wimbledon, Connors defeated Mikael Pernfors, ten years his junior, in five sets from two sets down and having trailed 1–4 in the third set and 0–3 in the fourth set. He lost in straight sets in the semi finals to Pat Cash. Afterwards 22 year old Cash said "I hope I'm not playing at 34 ... I'd like to be going to the pub with the boys". Lendl made Connors look slow around the court as he beat the veteran in straight sets in the semi finals of the US Open. Connors ended 1987 ranked four at the age of 35. In July 1988, Connors ended a four-year title drought by winning the Sovran Bank Tennis Classic in Washington, D.C. It was the 106th title of his career. Connors had played in 56 tournaments and lost 11 finals since his previous victory in the Tokyo Indoors against Lendl in October 1984. He also won the title at Toulouse.

=== 1989 ===
Connors won the final tournaments of his career at Toulouse (beating his old rival McEnroe, who was then ranked No. 4 in the world) and Tel Aviv. As of 2025, he still holds the Open era record with 109 men's singles titles. At the US Open, Connors defeated the third seed (and future two-time champion) Stefan Edberg, in straight sets in the fourth round, in a match in which Connors accumulated fines of $2,250 for three code violations, was penalized a game in the second set and was one more code violation from being defaulted. Afterwards Connors said "I went out and played a match everybody dreams will happen and he played one of those matches you hope you have only one time in your career.” Connors pushed sixth-seeded Andre Agassi to five sets in the quarterfinals before losing. He ended 1989 ranked 14 in the world.

=== 1990–1991 ===
Connors's career seemed to be at an end in 1990, when he played only three tournament matches and lost all three, dropping to No. 936 in the world rankings. However, after surgery on his deteriorating left wrist, he came back to play 14 tournaments in 1991. An ailing back forced him to retire from a five-sets match in the third round of the French Open against Michael Chang, the 1989 champion. Connors walked off the court, after hitting a service-return winner against Chang on the first point of the fifth set, having just levelled the match by winning the fourth.

Connors recuperated and made an improbable run to the 1991 US Open semifinals which he later said were "the best 11 days of my tennis career". In the first round, Connors was two sets and 3–0 down against Patrick McEnroe before winning in five sets. He then had straight sets wins over Michiel Schapers and 10th seed Karel Novacek. In the fourth round, on his 39th birthday, he defeated 24-year-old Aaron Krickstein in five sets, in 4 hours and 41 minutes, coming back from a 2–5 deficit in the final set. Connors then defeated Paul Haarhuis in the quarterfinals in four sets after Haarhuis had served for a two sets to love lead. He lost to Jim Courier in the semifinals, in straight sets. 22 years later, ESPN aired a documentary commemorating Connors's run.

=== 1992 ===
Connors beat world No. 3, Michael Stich, at Memphis. Afterwards Stich accused Connors of being "very unfair on the court,” saying "he talks to the crowd between your first and second serves and he talks to the crowd as you are preparing for your serve. If that's his idea of winning... I think it's ridiculous what he's doing." Connors lost in the semifinals to Mal Washington. He beat 20 year old world No. 12, Wayne Ferreira, to reach the quarterfinals at Indianapolis, before losing to Boris Becker. Connors participated in his last major tournament, in the 1992 US Open, where he beat 22 year old Jaime Oncins in straight sets in the first round on his 40th birthday, before losing to Lendl (then ranked No. 7) in four sets, in the second round.

In September, Connors played Martina Navratilova in the third Battle of the Sexes tennis match at Caesars Palace in Las Vegas, Nevada. Connors was allowed only one serve per point and Navratilova was allowed to hit into half the doubles court. Connors won in straight sets and won an estimated $1 million.

=== 1993–1996 ===
In February 1993, Connors reached the semifinals of the San Francisco tournament, beating Richard Matuszewski, Bryan Shelton (in an ill-tempered match in which Shelton afterwards accused Connors of disrupting his concentration by stalling, yelling obscenities and playing to the crowd) and 21 year old Chuck Adams, before retiring against Brad Gilbert due to bone spurs in his right foot.

However, this would not be the end of his playing career. As late as June 1995, three months shy of his 43rd birthday, Connors beat 22 year old Sébastien Lareau, in straight sets, and 27 year old Martin Sinner, in straight sets, to progress to the quarterfinals of the Halle event in Germany. Connors lost this quarterfinal in straight sets to Marc Rosset. His last match on the ATP Tour came in April 1996, when he lost in three sets to Richey Reneberg in Atlanta.

== Rivalries ==
=== Björn Borg ===
During his best years of 1974 through 1978, Connors was challenged the most by Borg, with twelve matches on tour during that time frame. Borg won only four of those meetings, but two of those wins were in the Wimbledon finals of 1977 and 1978. Connors lost his stranglehold on the top ranking to Borg in early 1979 and wound up with an official tour record of 8 wins and 15 losses against Borg as Borg was four years younger and won the last ten times they met. Head to head in major championship finals, they split their four meetings, Borg winning two Wimbledons (1977 and 1978) and Connors winning two US Opens (1976 and 1978). Connors described his rivalry with Borg in a 1987 newspaper article by saying "Borg and I were fire and ice. We were just entirely different people on and off the court."

=== Ilie Năstase ===
Nastase was another rival in Connors's prime. Though six years older than Connors, Nastase won eleven of their first twelve meetings. However, Connors then won eleven of their final fifteen meetings to trail Nastase 12–15. The two would team up to win the doubles championships at the 1973 Wimbledon and the 1975 US Open.

=== Manuel Orantes and Guillermo Vilas ===
Orantes upset Connors in the final of the 1975 US Open, but Connors was 12 wins and 3 losses overall against Orantes in tour events. On the other hand, Vilas wore down Connors in the final of the 1977 US Open and was much more competitive in all of their meetings. Connors had a 5–4 head-to-head record against Vilas in tour events.

=== John Newcombe ===
In 1975, Connors won two highly touted "Challenge Matches", both arranged by the Riordan company and televised nationally by CBS Sports from Caesars Palace in Las Vegas, Nevada. After beating Rod Laver, in April, Connors met John Newcombe in a match billed as a $250,000 winner-takes-all. Connors won the match in four sets. Connors ended his business relationship with Riordan later in 1975.

Connors played Newcombe six matches listed on the ATP website, with Newcombe winning the first two meetings on grass (1973 US Open quarterfinal and 1975 Australian Open final) and Connors winning the last four on indoor carpet (WCT Aetna World Cup 1976 and 1978) and hard courts (1978 Sydney Indoor quarterfinal and 1979 Hong Kong round of 16).

=== John McEnroe ===
In the 1980 WCT Finals, Connors defeated the defending champion, John McEnroe. In 1982, at age 29, Connors was back in the Wimbledon singles final, where he faced McEnroe, who by then was established firmly as the world's top player. Connors recovered from being three points away from defeat in a fourth-set tie-break (at 3–4) to win the match, 3–6, 6–3, 6–7, 7–6, 6–4, and claimed his second Wimbledon title, eight years after his first.

Although Connors's tour record against McEnroe was 14–20 McEnroe is 6½ years younger than Connors and had a losing record against Connors until he won 12 out of their last 14 meetings. Head to head in major championship finals, they split their two meetings, Connors winning the 1982 Wimbledon in five sets, and McEnroe winning the 1984 Wimbledon in straight sets. McEnroe won six of their nine meetings in Grand Slam events. Connors described his rivalry with McEnroe in a newspaper article in 1987 by saying "We went at it on and off the court. That was because we were fire and fire, we were so similar. Still are."

=== Ivan Lendl ===
Connors defeated another of the next generation of tennis stars, Ivan Lendl, in the 1982 US Open final and soon regained the No. 1 ranking. Connors had a tour record of 13–22 against Lendl, but Lendl is eight years younger than Connors and had a losing record against Connors until he won their last 17 matches from 1984 through 1992, after Connors's prime. Head to head in major championship finals, Connors defeated Lendl in both meetings, winning the 1982 and 1983 US Open. Connors described his rivalry with Lendl in a newspaper article in 1987 by saying "Lendl and I didn't get along, and I won a lot early. He's won a lot later."

== Maverick ==
In 1974, Connors and Riordan began filing lawsuits against the ATP and its president, Arthur Ashe, for allegedly restricting his freedom in the game. The lawsuits stemmed from the French Open banning Connors in 1974 after he had signed a contract to play World Team Tennis (WTT) for the Baltimore Banners. Connors was seeking to enter the French Open, but the ATP and French officials opposed WTT because of scheduling conflicts. Just before the start of Wimbledon 1975 the British press reported that Riordan had filed lawsuits claiming damages against Arthur Ashe and ATP secretary Bob Briner. Ashe had criticised Connors in a letter as “seemingly unpatriotic” for playing lucrative ‘challenge’ matches, rather than joining the U.S. Davis Cup team and Briner had called Riordan, a “nihilist”. Connors dropped Riordan (and the lawsuits) in November 1975.

At Wimbledon in 1977, he declined to participate in a parade of former champions to celebrate the tournament's centenary, choosing instead to practice in the grounds with Ilie Nastase while the parade took place. In 2000, he also declined to join a gathering of 58 former champions held to mark the millennium. In his 2013 autobiography, Connors blamed his missing the 1977 parade on the All England Club for not letting his doctor onto the grounds so that Connors could try on a customized splint for a thumb injury. Connors explained that this necessitated his rushing to meet the doctor at the entrance to the grounds, and then convincing Nastase to help him try out the splint on a practice court. By Connors's account, he then rushed to Centre Court for the parade, but was too late.

Connors also irritated sponsors and tennis officials by shunning the end-of-year Masters championship from 1974 through 1976. However, he entered this round-robin competition in 1977 when it moved to New York City. Although Connors lost a celebrated late-night match to Vilas, he took the title by defeating Borg in the final.

In a semi final of a tournament at Boca Raton in February 1986 against Ivan Lendl, Connors protested what he said was a bad line call in the sixth game of the fifth set that gave Lendl a 3–2, 40–0 lead. Umpire Jeremy Shales, after imposing a 15-second warning, gave Connors a code-of-conduct warning for delay of game. Connors then was penalized a point giving Lendl the game and making the fifth-set score 4–2 for Lendl. Connors continued to protest and refused to play. He then was given a game penalty, making it 5–2 for Lendl. After supervisor Ken Farrar had failed to persuade Connors to continue play, he was defaulted. Connors insisted that he did not quit the match. Connors told reporters the next week at Palm Springs. "I didn't quit, I was defaulted. I take full credit, good or bad, for what I've done. If I'm suspended, I'll just go home and ride my horses. I was standing up for the rights of players. I'll tell you, if a lot of guys could afford it, they would do it. I did it because I thought it was right." A month after the incident, the Men's International Professional Tennis Council decided that Connors would be banned for 10 weeks and fined $20,000 (in addition to $5,000 imposed on the day of the match).

== Distinctions and honors ==
Connors is often considered among the greatest tennis players in the history of the sport. Connors won a male open era record 109 singles titles. He also won 16 doubles titles, including the men's doubles titles at Wimbledon in 1973 and the US Open in 1975. Connors has played more matches (1,557) and won more matches (1,274) than any other male professional tennis player in the Open Era. His career win–loss record was 1,274–283, for a winning percentage of 82.4. He played 398 tournaments, a record until Fabrice Santoro overtook it in 2008.

In Grand Slam Singles events, Connors reached the semifinals or better a total of 31 times and the quarterfinals or better a total of 41 times, despite entering the Australian Open Men's Singles only twice and not entering the French Open Men's Singles for five of his peak career years. The 31 semifinals stood as a record until surpassed by Roger Federer at Wimbledon 2012. The 41 quarterfinals remained a record until Roger Federer surpassed it at Wimbledon 2014. Connors was the only player to win the US Open on three different surfaces: grass, clay, and hard. He was also the first male tennis player to win Grand Slam singles titles on three different surfaces: grass (1974), clay (1976), and hard (1978).

Connors was inducted into the International Tennis Hall of Fame in 1998 and Intercollegiate Tennis Association (ITA) Hall of Fame in 1986. He also has a star on the St. Louis Walk of Fame. In his 1979 autobiography, tennis promoter and Grand Slam winning player Jack Kramer ranked Connors as one of the 21 best players of all time. Because of his fiery competitiveness and acrimonious relationships with a number of peers, he has been likened to baseball player Pete Rose. In 1983, Fred Perry ranked the greatest male players of all time and put them into two categories, before World War II and after. Perry's modern best behind Laver: "Borg, McEnroe, Connors, Hoad, Jack Kramer, John Newcombe, Ken Rosewall, Manuel Santana".

== Playing style ==
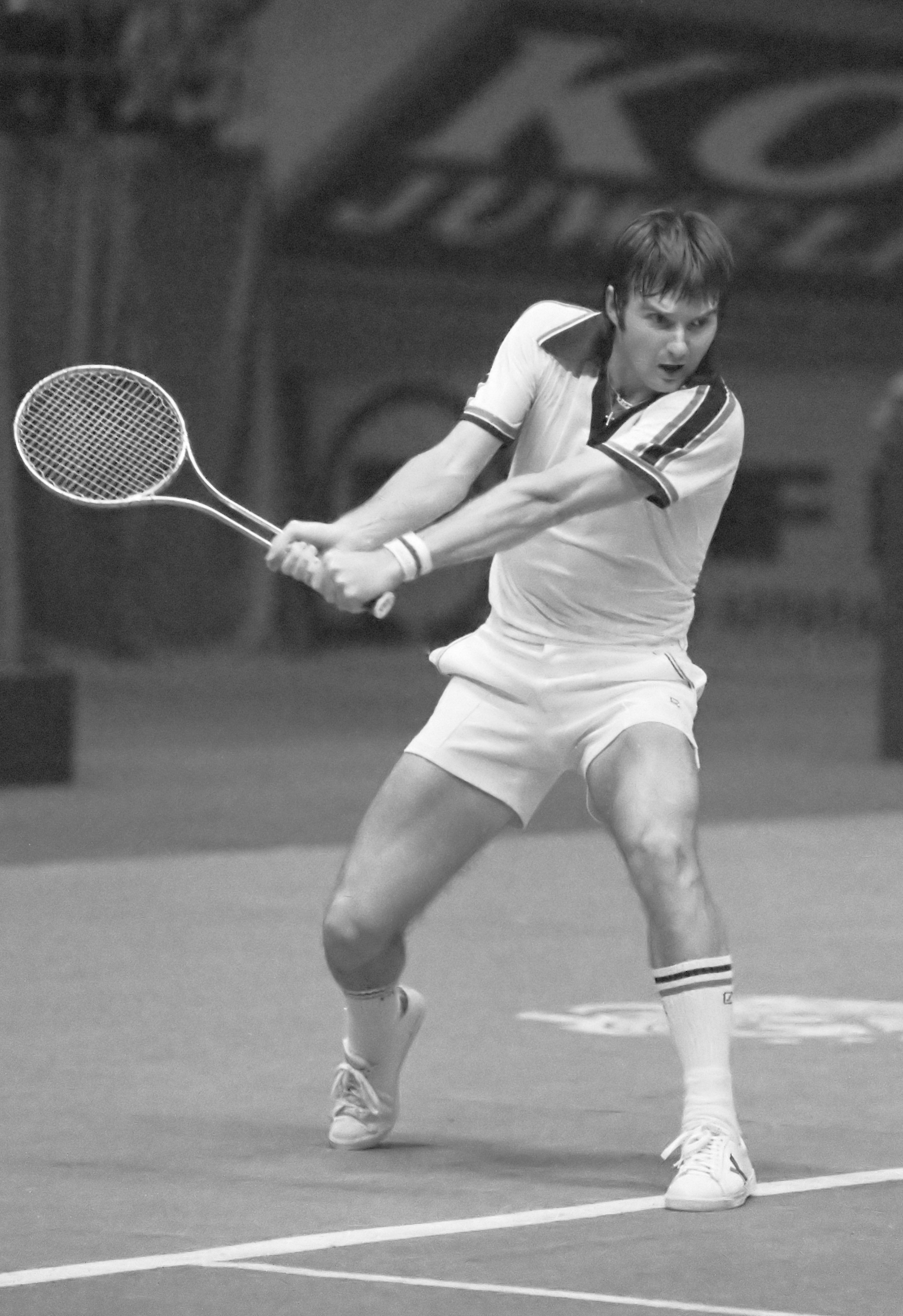
Jimmy Connors (1978)

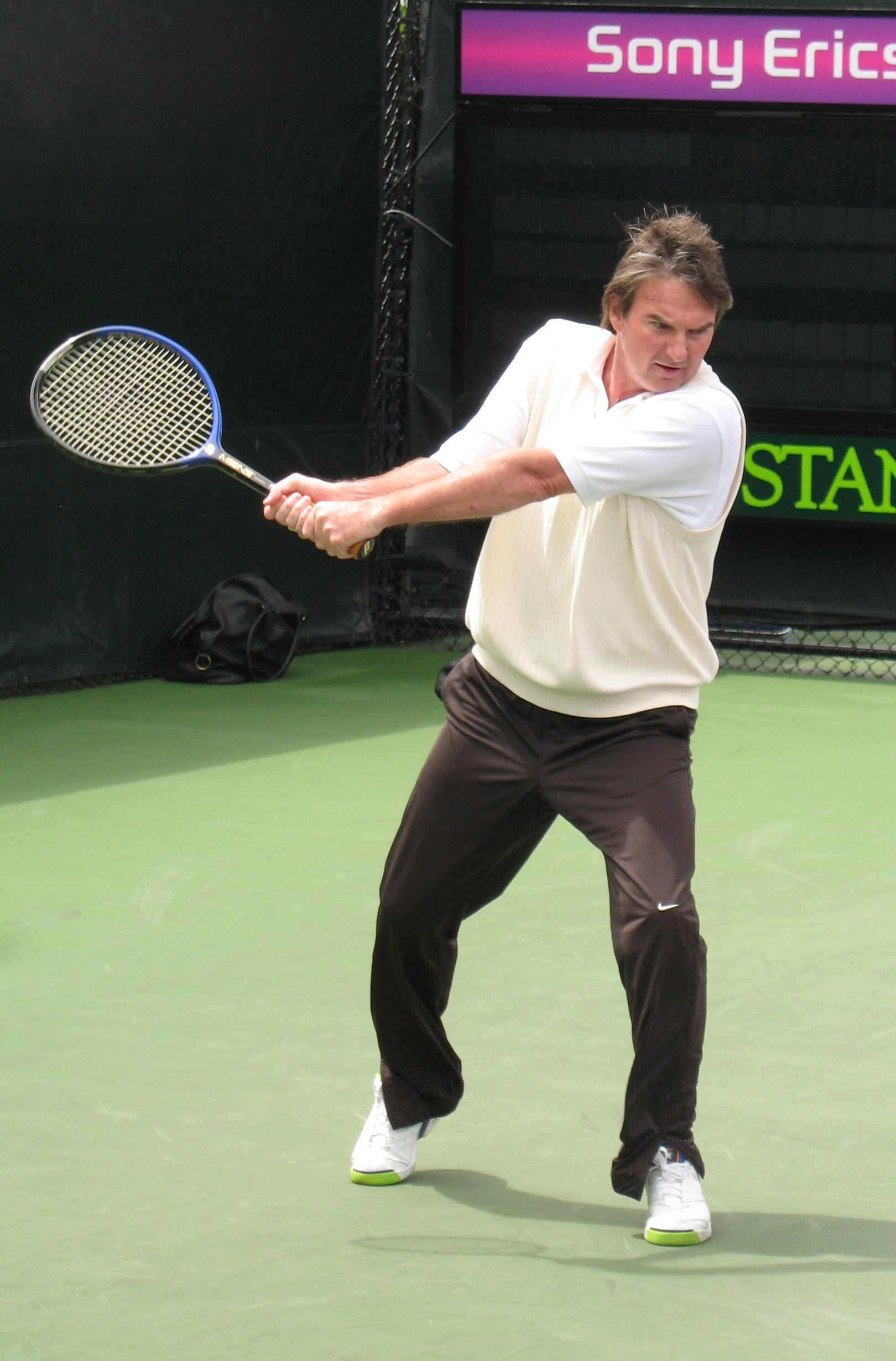
Jimmy Connors (2007)

In the modern era of power tennis, Connors's style of play has often been cited as highly influential, especially in the development of the flat backhand. Larry Schwartz on ESPN.com said about Connors, "His biggest weapons were an indomitable spirit, a two-handed backhand and the best service return in the game. It is difficult to say which was more instrumental in Connors becoming a champion. ... Though smaller than most of his competitors, Connors didn't let it bother him, making up for a lack of size with determination." Of his own competitive nature Connors has said, "[T]here's always somebody out there who's willing to push it that extra inch, or mile, and that was me. I didn't care if it took me 30 minutes or five hours. If you beat me, you had to be the best, or the best you had that day. But that was my passion for the game. If I won, I won, and if I lost, well, I didn't take it so well."

His on-court antics, designed to get the crowd involved, both helped and hurt his play. Schwartz said, "While tennis fans enjoyed Connors's gritty style and his never-say-die attitude, they often were shocked by his antics. His sometimes vulgar on-court behavior—like giving the finger to a linesman after disagreeing with a call or strutting about the court with the tennis racket handle between his legs; sometimes he would yank on the handle in a grotesque manner and his fans would go wild or groan in disapproval—did not help his approval rating. During the early part of his career, Connors frequently argued with umpires, linesmen, the players union, Davis Cup officials and other players. He was even booed at Wimbledon—a rare show of disapproval there—for snubbing the Parade of Champions on the first day of the Centenary in 1977." His brash behavior both on and off the court earned him a reputation as the brat of the tennis world. Tennis commentator Bud Collins nicknamed Connors the "Brash Basher of Belleville" after the St Louis suburb where he grew up. Connors himself thrived on the energy of the crowd, positive or negative, and manipulated and exploited it to his advantage in many of the greatest matches of his career.

Connors was taught to hit the ball on the rise by his teaching-pro mother, Gloria Connors, a technique he used to defeat the opposition in the early years of his career. Gloria sent her son to Southern California to work with Pancho Segura at the age of 16. Segura advanced Connors's game of hitting the ball on the rise which enabled Connors to reflect the power and velocity of his opponents back at them. In the 1975 Wimbledon final, Arthur Ashe countered this strategy by taking the pace off the ball, giving Connors soft-touch shots (dinks, drop shots, and lobs) to hit.

In an era when the serve and volley was the norm, Björn Borg excepted, Connors was one of the few players to hit the ball flat, low, and predominantly from the baseline. Connors hit his forehand with a semi-Western grip and with little net clearance. Contemporaries such as Arthur Ashe characterized his forehand as his greatest weakness, especially on extreme pressure points, as it lacked the safety margin of hard forehands hit with topspin. His serve, while accurate and capable, was never a great weapon for him as it did not reach the velocity and power of his opponents.

His lack of a dominating serve and net game, combined with his individualist style and maverick tendencies, meant that he was not as successful in doubles as he was in singles, although he did win Grand Slam titles with Ilie Năstase, reached a final with Chris Evert, and accumulated 16 doubles titles during his career.

== Racket evolution ==
At a time when most other tennis pros played with wooden rackets, Connors used the "Wilson T2000" steel racket, which utilized a method for stringing that had been devised and patented by Lacoste in 1953. He played with this chrome tubular steel racket until 1984, when most other pros had shifted to new racket technologies, materials, and designs.

At the Tokyo Indoor in October 1983, Connors switched to a new mid-size graphite racket, the Wilson ProStaff, that had been designed especially for him and he used it on the 1984 tour. But 1985 again found Connors playing with the T2000. In 1987, he finally switched to a graphite racket when he signed a contract with Slazenger to play their Panther Pro Ceramic. In 1990, Connors signed with Estusa.

== Other endeavors ==
In 1988, Connors auditioned to host the NBC daytime version of Wheel of Fortune, a show of which he and his wife "never missed an episode". However, the job went to Rolf Benirschke. According to show creator Merv Griffin, many news outlets tried to obtain Connors's audition tape, but Griffin refused to release it because he said "it wouldn't have been fair to Jimmy."

Connors provided commentary with NBC-TV in 1990 and 1991, during its coverage of the French Open and Wimbledon tournaments. During the Wimbledon tournaments of 2005, 2006, and 2007, Connors commentated for the BBC alongside John McEnroe (among others), providing moments of heated discussion between two former archrivals. Connors returned to BBC commentary at Wimbledon in 2014. Connors has also served as a commentator and analyst for the Tennis Channel since the US Open tournament of 2009.

In the 1990s, he joined his brother John as an investor in the Argosy Gaming Company, which owned riverboat casinos on the Mississippi River. The two owned 19 percent of the company which was headquartered in East Alton, Illinois, in the St. Louis metropolitan area. Argosy narrowly averted bankruptcy in the late 1990s and Connors's brother sought Chapter 7 bankruptcy. In the liquidation, Connors, through his company, Smooth Swing, acquired the Alystra Casino in Henderson, Nevada, for $1.9 million from Union Planters Bank, which had foreclosed on John. In 1995, John Connors had opened the casino with announced plans to include a Jimmy Connors theme area. It closed in 1998, and thieves subsequently stripped its copper piping. The casino never reopened under Connors's ownership and it was destroyed in a May 2008 fire.

In July 2006, American tennis player Andy Roddick announced that Connors was his new coach. In September 2006, Roddick reached the final of the U.S. Open, where he lost to Roger Federer. On March 6, 2008, Roddick announced that Connors was no longer his coach.

In July 2013, Maria Sharapova announced on her website that Connors was her new coach. In August 2013, Sharapova confirmed that she had ended the partnership with Connors after just one match.

Also in 2013, Connors published his autobiography The Outsider. It won the British Sports Book Awards in the "Best Autobiography/Biography" category.

On July 24, 2018, LiveWire Ergogenics, Inc. announced that Connors joined the firm as a spokesman and advisor. The company focuses on real estate, and the licensing and management of production facilities for cannabis-based products.

In December 2019, Connors appeared as himself on season 18 episode 9 of Family Guy titled Christmas Is Coming.

== Personal life ==
Connors was engaged to fellow tennis pro Chris Evert from 1974 to 1975, and they each triumphed in the singles events at the 1974 Wimbledon Championships, a feat labelled "The Lovebird Double" by the media. Their engagement was broken off shortly before the 1975 Wimbledon championship. Connors and Evert briefly reconciled in 1976 and 1978, before permanently ending their relationship. In May 2013, Connors wrote his autobiography in which he alleged that Evert was pregnant with their child and that she unilaterally decided to have an abortion.

Former Miss World Marjorie Wallace was engaged to Connors from 1976 to 1977. In 1979, Connors married Playboy model Patti McGuire. They have two children, and live in the Santa Barbara, California, area.

In October 2005, Connors had a hip-replacement surgery at Cedars-Sinai Medical Center in Los Angeles.

On January 8, 2007, Connors's mother Gloria died at age 82.

On November 21, 2008, Connors was arrested outside an NCAA basketball game between the University of North Carolina at Chapel Hill and the University of California at Santa Barbara after refusing to comply with an order to leave an area near the entrance to the stadium. The charges were dismissed by a judge on February 10, 2009.

== Career statistics ==
=== Singles performance timeline ===
Key
W	F	SF	QF	#R	RR	Q#	DNQ	A	NH

(W) winner; (F) finalist; (SF) semifinalist; (QF) quarterfinalist; (#R) rounds 4, 3, 2, 1; (RR) round-robin stage; (Q#) qualification round; (DNQ) did not qualify; (A) absent; (NH) not held; (SR) strike rate (events won / competed); (W–L) win–loss record.

Tournament	1969	1970	1971	1972	1973	1974	1975	1976	1977	1978	1979	1980	1981	1982	1983	1984	1985	1986	1987	1988	1989	1990	1991	1992	SR	W–L	Win %
Grand Slam tournaments
Australian Open	A	A	A	A	A	W	F	A	A	A	A	A	A	A	A	A	A	NH	A	A	A	A	A	A	1 / 2	11–1	91.67
French Open	A	A	A	2R	1R	A	A	A	A	A	SF	SF	QF	QF	QF	SF	SF	A	QF	A	2R	A	3R	1R	0 / 13	40–13	75.47
Wimbledon	A	A	A	QF	QF	W	F	QF	F	F	SF	SF	SF	W	4R	F	SF	1R	SF	4R	2R	A	3R	1R	2 / 20	84–18	82.35
US Open	LQ	1R	2R	1R	QF	W	F	W	F	W	SF	SF	SF	W	W	SF	SF	3R	SF	QF	QF	A	SF	2R	5 / 22	98–17	85.22
W–L	0–0	0–1	1–1	5–3	8–3	20–0	17–3	11–1	12–2	13–1	15–3	15–3	14–3	18–1	14–2	16–3	15–3	2–2	14–3	7–2	6–3	0–0	9–3	1–3	8 / 57	233–49	82.62
Year-end championships
Masters Cup				SF	SF				W	RR	SF	SF	RR	SF	SF	SF			RR						1 / 11	18–17	51.43
WCT Finals									W		SF	W				F	SF								2 / 5	10–3	76.92
W–L				2–2	2–2				7–1	1–1	3–3	6–1	1–2	1–1	1–1	3–2	1–1		0–3						3 / 16	28–20	58.33
Ranking					3	1	1	1	1	1	2	3	3	2	3	2	4	8	4	7	14	936	49	84	$ 8,641,040		

- Australian Open was held twice in 1977, in January and December. Connors did not play these tournaments.

== Records ==
- These records were attained in Open Era of tennis.
- Combined tours included Association of Tennis Professionals, Grand Prix Circuit, World Championship Tennis.
- Records in **bold** indicate peer-less achievements.

Time span	Selected Grand Slam tournament records	Players matched
1974	100% (20–0) match winning percentage in 1 season	Rod Laver
1974–1985	12 consecutive years with match winning percentage of 80%+	**Stands alone**
1974 US Open	Shortest final (by duration and number of games) vs. Ken Rosewall (Note: The final took 1 hour, 18 minutes to complete in 20 games.)	**Stands alone**

Grand Slam tournaments	Time span	Records at each Grand Slam tournament	Players matched	Refs
Australian Open	1974	Won title on the first attempt	Roscoe Tanner; Vitas Gerulaitis; Johan Kriek; Andre Agassi	
US Open	1974–1983	5 titles overall	Pete Sampras; Roger Federer	
US Open	1974 (grass); 1976 (clay); 1978 (hard)	3 titles on 3 different surfaces	**Stands alone**	
US Open	1974–1985	12 consecutive semifinals	**Stands alone**	
US Open	1974–1991	14 semifinals	**Stands alone**	
US Open	1973–1985	13 consecutive quarterfinals	**Stands alone**	
US Open	1973–1991	17 quarterfinals	**Stands alone**	
US Open	1971–1992	98 match wins	**Stands alone**	
US Open	1970–1992	115 matches played	**Stands alone**	
US Open	1970–1992	22 tournaments played	**Stands alone**	

Time span	Other selected records	Players matched
1972–1989	109 career titles	**Stands alone**
1972–1989	48 WCT titles	**Stands alone**
1971–1989	164 career finals	**Stands alone**
1970–1995	1274 career matches won	**Stands alone**
1970–1996	1557 career matches played	**Stands alone**
1973	9 hard court titles in 1 season	Roger Federer
1974	4 grass court titles in 1 season	**Stands alone**
1972–1989	53 career indoor titles	**Stands alone**
1972–1989	79 career indoor finals	**Stands alone**
1972–1984	45 carpet court titles	**Stands alone**
1970–1993	486 indoor match wins	**Stands alone**
1970–1991	392 carpet court match wins	**Stands alone**
1973–1984	12 consecutive years with match winning percentage of 80%+	**Stands alone**
1972–1980	9 consecutive years winning 5+ titles	**Stands alone**
1972–1984	13 consecutive years winning 4+ titles	**Stands alone**
1973–1978	4 years winning 10+ titles	Ivan Lendl
1974–1975	2 winning streaks of 35+ matches	Björn Borg; Roger Federer
1974	44 consecutive sets won	**Stands alone**
1975–1978	3 calendar years as wire-to-wire No. 1	Roger Federer
1973–1984	Ended 12 consecutive years ranked inside the top 3	**Stands alone**
1973–1986	651 consecutive weeks ranked inside the top 4	**Stands alone**
1973–1986	659 consecutive weeks ranked inside the top 5	**Stands alone**
1976–1980	4 U.S. Pro Indoor singles titles	Rod Laver; John McEnroe; Pete Sampras
1973–1984	4 Los Angeles Open singles titles	Andre Agassi; Roy Emerson; Frank Parker

== Professional awards ==
- ITF World Champion: 1982
- ATP Player of the Year: 1974, 1982
- ATP Comeback Player of the Year: 1991

== See also ==
- ATP World Tour records
- Connors–McEnroe rivalry
- List of open era tennis records
- List of Grand Slam related tennis records
- Tennis male players statistics
- Tennis records of All Time – Men's singles
- Tennis records of the Open Era – Men's singles
- World number one male tennis player rankings

== Notes ==
Sporting positions
Preceded by John Newcombe; Björn Borg; Björn Borg; John McEnroe; John McEnroe; John McEnroe; John McEnroe; Ivan Lendl; John McEnroe	World No. 1 July 29, 1974 – August 22, 1977; August 30, 1977 – April 8, 1979; May 21, 1979 – July 8, 1979; September 13, 1982 – October 31, 1982; November 8, 1982 – November 14, 1982; January 31, 1983 – February 6, 1983; February 14, 1983 – February 27, 1983; May 16, 1983 – June 5, 1983; June 13, 1983 – July 3, 1983	Succeeded by Björn Borg; Björn Borg; Björn Borg; John McEnroe; John McEnroe; John McEnroe; Ivan Lendl; John McEnroe; John McEnroe
Awards and achievements
Preceded by John McEnroe	ITF World Champion; 1982	Succeeded by John McEnroe
Preceded by Chris Evert	BBC Overseas Sports Personality of the Year; 1982	Succeeded by Carl Lewis
