= 1980 World Championship Tennis Finals =

- Date: April 28 – May 4
- Edition: 10th
- Draw: 8S
- Prize money: $250,000
- Surface: Carpet / indoor
- Location: Dallas, Texas, US
- Venue: Reunion Arena

Champions

Singles
- (United States) Jimmy Connors
- WCT Finals

The 1980 World Championship Tennis Finals was a men's tennis tournament played on indoor carpet courts. It was the 10th edition of the season-ending WCT Finals and was part of the 1980 Volvo Grand Prix. It was played at the Reunion Arena in Dallas, Texas in the United States and was held from April 28 through May 4, 1980. Second-seeded Jimmy Connors won the title.

== Final ==
=== Singles ===
(United States) Jimmy Connors defeated (United States) John McEnroe 2–6, 7–6, 6–1, 6–2

- It was Connors' 3rd title of the year and the 94th of his career.

== See also ==
- Connors–McEnroe rivalry
- 1980 WCT World Doubles
