= Ivan Lendl career statistics =

This is a list of the main career statistics of professional tennis player Ivan Lendl.

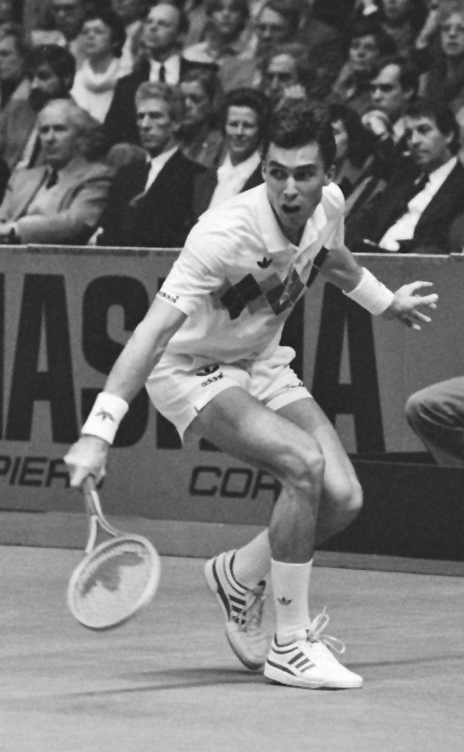
Ivan Lendl in 1984.

== Grand Slam finals ==
=== Singles: 19 finals (8 titles, 11 runner-ups) ===
Result	Year	Championship	Surface	Opponent	Score
Loss	1981	French Open	Clay	(Sweden) Björn Borg	1–6, 6–4, 2–6, 6–3, 1–6
Loss	1982	US Open	Hard	(United States) Jimmy Connors	3–6, 2–6, 6–4, 4–6
Loss	1983	US Open	Hard	(United States) Jimmy Connors	3–6, 7–6^{(7–2)}, 5–7, 0–6
Loss	1983	Australian Open	Grass	(Sweden) Mats Wilander	1–6, 4–6, 4–6
Win	1984	French Open	Clay	(United States) John McEnroe	3–6, 2–6, 6–4, 7–5, 7–5
Loss	1984	US Open	Hard	(United States) John McEnroe	3–6, 4–6, 1–6
Loss	1985	French Open	Clay	(Sweden) Mats Wilander	6–3, 4–6, 2–6, 2–6
Win	1985	US Open	Hard	(United States) John McEnroe	7–6^{(7–1)}, 6–3, 6–4
Win	1986	French Open (2)	Clay	(Sweden) Mikael Pernfors	6–3, 6–2, 6–4
Loss	1986	Wimbledon	Grass	(Germany) Boris Becker	4–6, 3–6, 5–7
Win	1986	US Open (2)	Hard	(Czechoslovakia) Miloslav Mečíř	6–4, 6–2, 6–0
Win	1987	French Open (3)	Clay	(Sweden) Mats Wilander	7–5, 6–2, 3–6, 7–6^{(7–3)}
Loss	1987	Wimbledon	Grass	(Australia) Pat Cash	6–7^{(5–7)}, 4–6, 5–7
Win	1987	US Open (3)	Hard	(Sweden) Mats Wilander	6–7^{(7–9)}, 6–0, 7–6^{(7–4)}, 6–4
Loss	1988	US Open	Hard	(Sweden) Mats Wilander	4–6, 6–4, 3–6, 7–5, 4–6
Win	1989	Australian Open	Hard	(Czechoslovakia) Miloslav Mečíř	6–2, 6–2, 6–2
Loss	1989	US Open	Hard	(Germany) Boris Becker	6–7^{(2–7)}, 6–1, 3–6, 6–7^{(4–7)}
Win	1990	Australian Open (2)	Hard	(Sweden) Stefan Edberg	4–6, 7–6^{(7–3)}, 5–2 retired
Loss	1991	Australian Open	Hard	(Germany) Boris Becker	6–1, 4–6, 4–6, 4–6

== Grand Prix year-end championships finals ==
=== Singles: 9 finals (5 titles, 4 runner-ups) ===
- Note: Lendl formerly held the record for the most final appearances at 9, until Federer broke it with his 10th final appearance in 2015. Roger Federer broke a tie with Lendl and Pete Sampras by claiming his sixth year-ending championship on November 27, 2011.

Result	W–L	Year	Championship	Surface	Opponent	Score
Loss	0–1	1980	Grand Prix Masters	Carpet (i)	(Sweden) Björn Borg	4–6, 2–6, 2–6
Win	1–1	1981	Grand Prix Masters	Carpet (i)	(United States) Vitas Gerulaitis	6–7^{(5–7)}, 2–6, 7–6^{(8–6)}, 6–2, 6–4
Win	2–1	1982	Grand Prix Masters (2)	Carpet (i)	(United States) John McEnroe	6–4, 6–4, 6–2
Loss	2–2	1983	Grand Prix Masters	Carpet (i)	(United States) John McEnroe	3–6, 4–6, 4–6
Loss	2–3	1984	Grand Prix Masters	Carpet (i)	(United States) John McEnroe	5–7, 0–6, 4–6
Win	3–3	1985	Grand Prix Masters (3)	Carpet (i)	(West Germany) Boris Becker	6–2, 7–6^{(7–1)}, 6–3
Win	4–3	1986	Grand Prix Masters (4)	Carpet (i)	(West Germany) Boris Becker	6–4, 6–4, 6–4
Win	5–3	1987	Grand Prix Masters (5)	Carpet (i)	(Sweden) Mats Wilander	6–2, 6–2, 6–3
Loss	5–4	1988	Grand Prix Masters	Carpet (i)	(West Germany) Boris Becker	7–5, 6–7^{(5–7)}, 6–3, 2–6, 6–7^{(5–7)}

== WCT year-end championships finals ==
=== Singles: 3 finals (2 titles, 1 runner-up) ===
Result	Year	Tournament	Surface	Opponent	Score
Win	1982	WCT Finals	Carpet (i)	(United States) John McEnroe	6–2, 3–6, 6–3, 6–3
Loss	1983	WCT Finals	Carpet (i)	(United States) John McEnroe	2–6, 6–4, 3–6, 7–6^{(7-5)}, 6–7^{(0-7)}
Win	1985	WCT Finals (2)	Carpet (i)	(United States) Tim Mayotte	7–6^{(7-4)}, 6–4, 6–1

== Grand Prix Super Series / ATP Super 9 finals ==
=== Singles: 33 (22 titles, 11 runner-ups) ===
Result	Year	Tournament	Surface	Opponent	Score
Win	1980	Toronto	Hard	(Sweden) Björn Borg	4–6, 5–4 ret.
Win	1981	Las Vegas	Hard	(United States) Harold Solomon	6–4, 6–2
Win	1981	Toronto	Hard	(United States) Eliot Teltscher	6–3, 6–2
Loss	1982	Monte Carlo	Clay	(Argentina) Guillermo Vilas	1–6, 6–7, 3–6
Win	1982	Forest Hills	Clay	(United States) Eddie Dibbs	6–1, 6–1
Loss	1982	Toronto	Hard	(United States) Vitas Gerulaitis	6–4, 1–6, 3–6
Win	1982	Cincinnati	Hard	(United States) Steve Denton	6–2, 7–6
Loss	1983	Philadelphia	Carpet (i)	(United States) John McEnroe	6–4, 6–7, 4–6, 3–6
Win	1983	Toronto	Hard	(Sweden) Anders Jarryd	6–2, 6–2
Win	1983	Tokyo	Carpet (i)	(United States) Scott Davis	3–6, 6–3, 6–4
Loss	1984	Philadelphia	Carpet (i)	(United States) John McEnroe	3–6, 6–3, 3–6, 6–7
Loss	1984	Forest Hills	Clay	(United States) John McEnroe	4–6, 2–6
Loss	1984	Tokyo	Carpet (i)	(United States) Jimmy Connors	4–6, 6–3, 0–6
Win	1985	Monte Carlo	Clay	(Sweden) Mats Wilander	6–1, 6–3, 4–6, 6–4
Win	1985	Forest Hills	Clay	(United States) John McEnroe	6–3, 6–3
Loss	1985	Toronto	Hard	(United States) John McEnroe	5–7, 3–6
Win	1985	Tokyo	Carpet (i)	(Sweden) Mats Wilander	6–0, 6–4
Win	1986	Philadelphia	Carpet (i)	(United States) Tim Mayotte	walkover
Win	1986	Miami	Hard	(Sweden) Mats Wilander	4–6, 6–1, 7–6, 6–4
Win	1986	Rome	Clay	(Spain) Emilio Sánchez	7–5, 4–6, 6–1, 6–1
Loss	1987	Miami	Hard	(Czech Republic) Miloslav Mečíř	5–7, 2–6, 5–7
Win	1987	Hamburg	Clay	(Czech Republic) Miloslav Mečíř	6–1, 6–3, 6–3
Win	1987	Toronto	Hard	(Sweden) Stefan Edberg	6–4, 7–6
Loss	1987	Tokyo	Carpet (i)	(Sweden) Stefan Edberg	7–6, 4–6, 4–6
Win	1988	Monte Carlo	Clay	(Argentina) Martín Jaite	5–7, 6–4, 7–5, 6–3
Win	1988	Rome	Clay	(Argentina) Guillermo Pérez Roldán	2–6, 6–4, 6–2, 4–6, 6–4
Win	1988	Toronto	Hard	(United States) Kevin Curren	7–6, 6–2
Win	1989	Miami	Hard	(Austria) Thomas Muster	walkover
Win	1989	Hamburg	Clay	(Austria) Horst Skoff	6–4, 6–1, 6–3
Win	1989	Toronto	Hard	(United States) John McEnroe	6–1, 6–3
Win	1989	Stockholm	Carpet (i)	(Sweden) Magnus Gustafsson	7–5, 6–0, 6–3
Loss	1992	Toronto	Hard	(United States) Andre Agassi	6–3, 2–6, 0–6
Loss	1992	Cincinnati	Hard	(United States) Pete Sampras	3–6, 6–3, 3–6

== Singles performance timeline ==
Key
W	F	SF	QF	#R	RR	Q#	DNQ	A	NH

(W) winner; (F) finalist; (SF) semifinalist; (QF) quarterfinalist; (#R) rounds 4, 3, 2, 1; (RR) round-robin stage; (Q#) qualification round; (DNQ) did not qualify; (A) absent; (NH) not held; (SR) strike rate (events won / competed); (W–L) win–loss record.

	Czechoslovakia														United States				
Name	1978	1979	1980	1981	1982	1983	1984	1985	1986	1987	1988	1989	1990	1991	1992	1993	1994	SR	W–L
Grand Slams
Australian Open	A	A	2R	A	A	F	4R	SF	NH	SF	SF	W	W	F	QF	1R	4R	2 / 12	48–10
French Open	1R	4R	3R	F	4R	QF	W	F	W	W	QF	4R	A	A	2R	1R	1R	3 / 15	53–12
Wimbledon	A	1R	3R	1R	A	SF	SF	4R	F	F	SF	SF	SF	3R	4R	2R	A	0 / 14	48–14
US Open	A	2R	QF	4R	F	F	F	W	W	W	F	F	QF	SF	QF	1R	2R	3 / 16	73–13
Win–loss	0–1	4–3	9–4	9–3	9–2	20–4	20–3	20–3	20–1	24–2	20–4	21–3	16–2	13–3	12–4	1–4	4–3	8 / 57	222–49
Year-end championships
Masters Grand Prix	A	A	F	W	W	F	F	W	W	W	F	SF	SF	SF	A	A	A	5 / 12	39–10
WCT Finals	A	A	SF	A	W	F	A	W	A	A	A	SF	not held					2 / 5	10–3
Grand Slam Cup	not held												QF	SF	A	A	A	0 / 2	3–2
Grand Prix Super Series / Super 9 tournaments
Philadelphia	A	A	A	A	A	F	F	A	W	Not GPSS			Not Super 9					1 / 3	12–2
Key Biscayne	not held							4R	W	F	A	W	4R	A	A	A	2R	2 / 6	24–4
Las Vegas	A	A	SF	W	Not Grand Prix Super Series								Not Super 9					1 / 2	8–1
Forest Hills	Not GPSS				W	3R	F	W	Not GPSS				Not Super 9					2 / 4	17–2
Monte Carlo	A	1R	2R	A	F	1R	QF	W	A	A	W	A	A	A	A	3R	A	2 / 8	18–6
Hamburg	A	A	SF	A	A	3R	A	A	A	W	A	W	A	2R	2R	QF	1R	2 / 8	17–6
Rome	A	3R	QF	SF	A	A	A	A	W	3R	W	A	A	A	2R	1R	A	2 / 8	24–6
Canada	A	SF	W	W	F	W	2R	F	3R	W	W	W	A	SF	F	QF	3R	6 / 15	57–9
Cincinnati	NGPSS			A	W	SF	A	A	A	A	A	A	A	3R	F	2R	2R	1 / 6	14–5
Stockholm	2R	A	A	NGPSS			A	A	A	A	A	W	A	3R	A	A	A	1 / 3	7–2
Tokyo	A	2R	QF	A	A	W	F	W	SF	F	A	NGP	Not Super 9					2 / 7	24–5
Paris	Not Grand Prix Super Series											A	3R	A	A	1R	A	0 / 2	1–2

== Tournaments statistics ==
	Czechoslovakia														United States			
Name	1978	1979	1980	1981	1982	1983	1984	1985	1986	1987	1988	1989	1990	1991	1992	1993	1994	Total
ATP tournaments	7	17	33	21	23	23	16	17	15	16	10	17	16	21	24	25	18	319
Titles	0	0	7	10	15	7	3	11	9	8	3	10	5	3	1	2	0	94
Runner-ups	0	1	3	5	5	6	8	3	3	4	2	2	1	3	3	2	1	52
Semifinal	2	3	8	2	0	3	1	1	2	2	2	4	4	6	2	0	1	43
Quarterfinal	0	4	5	1	2	2	1	0	0	0	1	0	3	0	8	5	4	36
Round of 16	1	5	3	2	1	1	1	2	1	2	1	1	2	5	7	4	7	46
Round of 32	2	2	7	0	0	4	1	0	0	0	1	0	1	4	2	6	1	31
Round of 64	1	1	0	0	0	0	1	0	0	0	0	0	0	0	1	3	3	10
Round of 128	1	1	0	1	0	0	0	0	0	0	0	0	0	0	0	3	1	7
Win–loss	9–9	38–20	110–28	96–14	106–9	75–16	62–16	84–7	74–6	74–7	41–8	79–7	54–12	55–18	50–24	33–23	28–18	1068–242
Win%	50%	66%	80%	87%	92%	82%	79%	92%	93%	91%	84%	92%	82%	75%	68%	59%	61%	82%
	1978	1979	1980	1981	1982	1983	1984	1985	1986	1987	1988	1989	1990	1991	1992	1993	1994	
Year-end ranking	74	20	6	2	3	2	3	1	1	1	2	1	3	5	8	19	54	N/A

ATP win–loss includes WCT tournaments which were run outside Volvo Grand Prix and ATP Computer Ranking system during 1982-1984, also includes team events (Davis Cup, World Team Cup in Düsseldorf).

== ATP career finals ==
=== Singles titles (94) ===
Tournament category	No. of titles
Grand Slam tournaments	(8–11)
Year-end championships – Grand Prix	(5–4)
Year-end championships – WCT	(2–1)
Grand Prix Super Series / ATP Super 9	(22–10)
ATP Championship Series	(6–3)
Grand Prix Regular Series / WCT Regular Series / ATP World Series	(51–23)

Titles by surface
Clay (28–10)
Grass (2–3)
Hard (30–22)
Carpet (34–17)

Titles by setting
Outdoor (52–33)
Indoor (42–19)

Result	No.	Date	Tournament	Surface	Opponent	Score
Win	1.	Apr 1980	Houston, U.S.	Clay	(United States) Eddie Dibbs	6–1, 6–3
Win	2.	Aug 1980	Toronto, Canada	Hard	(Sweden) Björn Borg	4–6, 5–4, ret.
Win	3.	Oct 1980	Barcelona, Spain	Clay	(Argentina) Guillermo Vilas	6–4, 5–7, 6–4, 4–6, 6–1
Win	4.	Oct 1980	Basel, Switzerland	Hard (i)	(Sweden) Björn Borg	6–3, 6–2, 5–7, 0–6, 6–4
Win	5.	Oct 1980	Tokyo Outdoor, Japan	Clay	(United States) Eliot Teltscher	3–6, 6–4, 6–0
Win	6.	Nov 1980	Hong Kong	Hard	(United States) Brian Teacher	5–7, 7–6^{(7–2)}, 6–3
Win	7.	Nov 1980	Taipei, Taiwan	Carpet (i)	(United States) Brian Teacher	6–7, 6–3, 6–3, 7–6^{(7–5)}
Win	8.	Mar 1981	Stuttgart, West Germany	Hard (i)	(New Zealand) Chris Lewis	6–3, 6–0, 6–7, 6–3
Win	9.	Apr 1981	Las Vegas, U.S.	Hard	(United States) Harold Solomon	6–4, 6–2
Win	10.	Aug 1981	Montreal, Canada (2)	Hard	(United States) Eliot Teltscher	6–3, 6–2
Win	11.	Oct 1981	Madrid, Spain	Clay	(Peru) Pablo Arraya	6–3, 6–2, 6–2
Win	12.	Oct 1981	Barcelona, Spain (2)	Clay	(Argentina) Guillermo Vilas	6–0, 6–3, 6–0
Win	13.	Oct 1981	Basel, Switzerland (2)	Hard (i)	(Argentina) José Luis Clerc	6–2, 6–3, 6–0
Win	14.	Oct 1981	Vienna, Austria	Hard (i)	(United States) Brian Gottfried	1–6, 6–0, 6–1, 6–2
Win	15.	Oct 1981	Cologne, West Germany	Carpet (i)	(United States) Sandy Mayer	6–3, 6–3
Win	16.	Nov 1981	Buenos Aires, Argentina	Clay	(Argentina) Guillermo Vilas	6–2, 6–2
Win	17.	Jan 1982	Volvo Masters, New York, U.S.	Carpet (i)	(United States) Vitas Gerulaitis	6–7^{(5–7)}, 2–6, 7–6^{(8–6)}, 6–2, 6–4
Win	18.	Jan 1982	Delray Beach WCT, U.S.	Clay	(Australia) Peter McNamara	6–4, 4–6, 6–4, 7–5
Win	19.	Feb 1982	Genova WCT, Italy	Carpet (i)	(United States) Vitas Gerulaitis	6–7^{(0–7)}, 6–4, 6–4, 6–3
Win	20.	Mar 1982	Munich-2 WCT, West Germany	Carpet (i)	(Czechoslovakia) Tomáš Šmíd	3–6, 6–3, 6–1, 6–2
Win	21.	Mar 1982	Strasbourg WCT, France	Carpet (i)	(United States) Tim Mayotte	6–0, 7–5, 6–1
Win	22.	Mar 1982	Frankfurt, West Germany	Carpet (i)	(Australia) Peter McNamara	6–2, 6–2
Win	23.	Apr 1982	Houston WCT, U.S. (2)	Clay	(Argentina) José Luis Clerc	3–6, 7–6^{(7–5)}, 6–0, 1–4, ret.
Win	24.	Apr 1982	Dallas WCT Finals, U.S.	Carpet (i)	(United States) John McEnroe	6–2, 3–6, 6–3, 6–3
Win	25.	May 1982	Forest Hills WCT, U.S.	Clay	(United States) Eddie Dibbs	6–1, 6–1
Win	26.	Jul 1982	Washington, D.C., U.S.	Clay	(United States) Jimmy Arias	6–3, 6–3
Win	27.	Aug 1982	North Conway, U.S.	Clay	(Spain) José Higueras	6–3, 6–2
Win	28.	Aug 1982	Cincinnati, U.S.	Hard	(United States) Steve Denton	6–2, 7–6
Win	29.	Sep 1982	Los Angeles-2 WCT, U.S.	Carpet (i)	(South Africa) Kevin Curren	7–6, 7–5, 6–1
Win	30.	Oct 1982	Naples WCT Fall Finals, Italy	Carpet (i)	(Poland) Wojciech Fibak	6–4, 6–2, 6–1
Win	31.	Dec 1982	Hartford WCT, U.S.	Carpet (i)	(United States) Bill Scanlon	6–2, 6–4, 7–5
Win	32.	Jan 1983	Volvo Masters, New York, U.S. (2)	Carpet (i)	(United States) John McEnroe	6–4, 6–4, 6–2
Win	33.	Jan 1983	Detroit WCT Winter Finals, U.S.	Carpet (i)	(Argentina) Guillermo Vilas	7–5, 6–2, 2–6, 6–4
Win	34.	Mar 1983	Milan, Italy	Carpet (i)	(South Africa) Kevin Curren	5–7, 6–3, 7–6^{(7–4)}
Win	35.	Apr 1983	Houston WCT, U.S. (3)	Clay	(Australia) Paul McNamee	6–2, 6–0, 6–3
Win	36.	Apr 1983	Hilton Head WCT, U.S.	Clay	(Argentina) Guillermo Vilas	6–2, 6–1, 6–0
Win	37.	Aug 1983	Montreal, Canada (3)	Hard	(Sweden) Anders Järryd	6–2, 6–2
Win	38.	Sep 1983	San Francisco, U.S.	Carpet (i)	(United States) John McEnroe	3–6, 7–6^{(7–4)}, 6–4
Win	39.	Oct 1983	Tokyo Indoor, Japan	Carpet (i)	(United States) Scott Davis	3–6, 6–3, 6–4
Win	40.	Apr 1984	Luxembourg	Carpet (i)	(Czechoslovakia) Tomáš Šmíd	6–4, 6–4
Win	41.	Jun 1984	French Open, Paris	Clay	(United States) John McEnroe	3–6, 2–6, 6–4, 7–5, 7–5
Win	42.	Nov 1984	Wembley, United Kingdom	Carpet (i)	(Ecuador) Andrés Gómez	7–6^{(7–1)}, 6–2, 6–1
Win	43.	Apr 1985	Ft. Myers, U.S.	Hard	(United States) Jimmy Connors	6–3, 6–2
Win	44.	Apr 1985	Monte Carlo, Monaco	Clay	(Sweden) Mats Wilander	6–1, 6–3, 4–6, 6–4
Win	45.	Apr 1985	Dallas WCT Finals, U.S. (2)	Carpet (i)	(United States) Tim Mayotte	7–6^{(7–4)}, 6–4, 6–1
Win	46.	May 1985	Forest Hills, U.S. (2)	Clay	(United States) John McEnroe	6–3, 6–3
Win	47.	Jul 1985	Indianapolis, U.S.	Clay	(Ecuador) Andrés Gómez	6–1, 6–3
Win	48.	Sep 1985	US Open, New York, U.S.	Hard	(United States) John McEnroe	7–6^{(7–1)}, 6–3, 6–4
Win	49.	Sep 1985	Stuttgart Outdoor, West Germany	Clay	(United States) Brad Gilbert	6–4, 6–0
Win	50.	Oct 1985	Sydney Indoor, Australia	Hard (i)	(France) Henri Leconte	6–4, 6–4, 7–6^{(8–6)}
Win	51.	Oct 1985	Tokyo Indoor, Japan (2)	Carpet (i)	(Sweden) Mats Wilander	6–0, 6–4
Win	52.	Nov 1985	Wembley, U.K. (2)	Carpet (i)	(Germany) Boris Becker	6–7^{(6–8)}, 6–3, 4–6, 6–4, 6–4
Win	53.	Jan 1986	Nabisco Masters, New York, U.S. (3)	Carpet (i)	(Germany) Boris Becker	6–2, 7–6^{(7–1)}, 6–3
Win	54.	Feb 1986	Philadelphia, U.S.	Carpet (i)	(United States) Tim Mayotte	Walkover
Win	55.	Feb 1986	Miami, U.S.	Hard	(Sweden) Mats Wilander	3–6, 6–1, 7–6^{(7–5)}, 6–4
Win	56.	Mar 1986	Milan, Italy (2)	Carpet (i)	(Sweden) Joakim Nyström	6–2, 6–2, 6–4
Win	57.	Mar 1986	Ft. Myers, U.S. (2)	Hard	(United States) Jimmy Connors	6–2, 6–0
Win	58.	May 1986	Rome, Italy	Clay	(Spain) Emilio Sánchez	7–5, 4–6, 6–1, 6–1
Win	59.	Jun 1986	French Open, Paris (2)	Clay	(Sweden) Mikael Pernfors	6–3, 6–2, 6–4
Win	60.	Aug 1986	Stratton Mountain, U.S. (2)	Hard	(Germany) Boris Becker	6–4, 7–6^{(7–0)}
Win	61.	Sep 1986	US Open, New York, U.S. (2)	Hard	(Czechoslovakia) Miloslav Mečíř	6–4, 6–2, 6–0
Win	62.	Dec 1986	Nabisco Masters, New York, U.S. (4)	Carpet (i)	(Germany) Boris Becker	6–4, 6–4, 6–4
Win	63.	May 1987	Hamburg, West Germany	Clay	(Czechoslovakia) Miloslav Mečíř	6–1, 6–3, 6–3
Win	64.	Jun 1987	French Open, Paris (3)	Clay	(Sweden) Mats Wilander	7–5, 6–2, 3–6, 7–6^{(7–3)}
Win	65.	Aug 1987	Washington, D.C., U.S. (2)	Hard	(United States) Brad Gilbert	6–1, 6–0
Win	66.	Aug 1987	Montreal, Canada (4)	Hard	(Sweden) Stefan Edberg	6–4, 7–6^{(7–2)}
Win	67.	Sep 1987	US Open, New York, U.S. (3)	Hard	(Sweden) Mats Wilander	6–7^{(7–9)}, 6–0, 7–6^{(7–4)}, 6–4
Win	68.	Oct 1987	Sydney Indoor, Australia (2)	Hard (i)	(Australia) Pat Cash	6–4, 6–2, 6–4
Win	69.	Nov 1987	Wembley, U.K. (3)	Carpet (i)	(Sweden) Anders Järryd	6–3, 6–2, 7–5
Win	70.	Dec 1987	Nabisco Masters, New York, U.S. (5)	Carpet (i)	(Sweden) Mats Wilander	6–2, 6–2, 6–3
Win	71.	Apr 1988	Monte Carlo, Monaco (2)	Clay	(Argentina) Martín Jaite	5–7, 6–4, 7–5, 6–3
Win	72.	May 1988	Rome, Italy (2)	Clay	(Argentina) Guillermo Pérez Roldán	2–6, 6–4, 6–2, 4–6, 6–4
Win	73.	Aug 1988	Toronto, Canada (5)	Hard	(United States) Kevin Curren	7–6^{(12–10)}, 6–2
Win	74.	Jan 1989	Australian Open, Melbourne	Hard	(Czechoslovakia) Miloslav Mečíř	6–2, 6–2, 6–2
Win	75.	Mar 1989	Scottsdale, U.S.	Hard	(Sweden) Stefan Edberg	6–2, 6–3
Win	76.	Apr 1989	Miami, U.S. (2)	Hard	(Austria) Thomas Muster	Walkover
Win	77.	May 1989	Forest Hills, U.S. (3)	Clay	(Peru) Jaime Yzaga	6–2, 6–1
Win	78.	May 1989	Hamburg, West Germany (2)	Clay	(Austria) Horst Skoff	6–4, 6–1, 6–3
Win	79.	Jun 1989	London/Queen's Club, U.K.	Grass	(South Africa) Christo van Rensburg	4–6, 6–3, 6–4
Win	80.	Aug 1989	Montreal, Canada (6)	Hard	(United States) John McEnroe	6–1, 6–3
Win	81.	Sep 1989	Bordeaux, France	Clay	(Spain) Emilio Sánchez	6–2, 6–2
Win	82.	Oct 1989	Sydney Indoor, Australia (3)	Hard (i)	(Sweden) Lars-Anders Wahlgren	6–2, 6–2, 6–1
Win	83.	Nov 1989	Stockholm, Sweden	Carpet (i)	(Sweden) Magnus Gustafsson	7–5, 6–0, 6–3
Win	84.	Jan 1990	Australian Open, Melbourne (2)	Hard	(Sweden) Stefan Edberg	4–6, 7–6^{(7–3)}, 5–2, retired
Win	85.	Feb 1990	Milan, Italy (3)	Carpet (i)	(United States) Tim Mayotte	6–3, 6–2
Win	86.	Feb 1990	Toronto Indoor, Canada	Carpet (i)	(United States) Tim Mayotte	6–3, 6–0
Win	87.	Jun 1990	London/Queen's Club, U.K. (2)	Grass	(Germany) Boris Becker	6–3, 6–2
Win	88.	Oct 1990	Tokyo Indoor, Japan (3)	Carpet (i)	(Germany) Boris Becker	4–6, 6–3, 7–6^{(7–5)}
Win	89.	Feb 1991	Philadelphia, U.S. (2)	Carpet (i)	(United States) Pete Sampras	5–7, 6–4, 6–4, 3–6, 6–3
Win	90.	Feb 1991	Memphis, U.S.	Hard (i)	(Germany) Michael Stich	7–5, 6–3
Win	91.	Aug 1991	Long Island, U.S.	Hard	(Sweden) Stefan Edberg	6–3, 6–2
Win	92.	Oct 1992	Tokyo Indoor, Japan (4)	Carpet (i)	(Sweden) Henrik Holm	7–6^{(9–7)}, 6–4
Win	93.	May 1993	Munich, Germany	Clay	(Germany) Michael Stich	7–6^{(7–2)}, 6–3
Win	94.	Oct 1993	Tokyo Indoor, Japan (5)	Carpet (i)	(United States) Todd Martin	6–4, 6–4

=== Runner-ups (52) ===
Result	No.	Year	Tournament	Surface	Opponent	Score
Loss	1.	1979	Brussels, Belgium	Clay	(Hungary) Balázs Taróczy	1–6, 6–1, 3–6
Loss	2.	1980	Washington-2, U.S.	Carpet (i)	(United States) Victor Amaya	7–6, 4–6, 5–7
Loss	3.	1980	Kitzbühel, Austria	Clay	(Argentina) Guillermo Vilas	3–6, 2–6, 2–6
Loss	4.	1980	Volvo Masters, New York City	Carpet (i)	(Sweden) Björn Borg	4–6, 2–6, 2–6
Loss	5.	1981	Richmond WCT, U.S.	Carpet (i)	(France) Yannick Noah	1–6, 1–3, ret.
Loss	6.	1981	La Quinta, U.S.	Hard	(United States) Jimmy Connors	3–6, 6–7
Loss	7.	1981	French Open, Paris	Clay	(Sweden) Björn Borg	1–6, 6–4, 2–6, 6–3, 1–6
Loss	8.	1981	Stuttgart Outdoor, Germany	Clay	(Sweden) Björn Borg	6–1, 6–7, 2–6, 4–6
Loss	9.	1981	Indianapolis, U.S.	Clay	(Argentina) José Luis Clerc	6–4, 4–6, 2–6
Loss	10.	1982	La Quinta, U.S.	Hard	(France) Yannick Noah	6–3, 2–6, 5–7
Loss	11.	1982	Monte Carlo, Monaco	Clay	(Argentina) Guillermo Vilas	1–6, 6–7, 3–6
Loss	12.	1982	Madrid, Spain	Clay	(Argentina) Guillermo Vilas	7–6, 6–4, 0–6, 3–6, 3–6
Loss	13.	1982	Toronto, Canada	Hard	(United States) Vitas Gerulaitis	6–4, 1–6, 3–6
Loss	14.	1982	US Open, New York City	Hard	(United States) Jimmy Connors	3–6, 2–6, 6–4, 4–6
Loss	15.	1983	Philadelphia, U.S.	Carpet (i)	(United States) John McEnroe	6–4, 6–7, 4–6, 3–6
Loss	16.	1983	Brussels Indoor, Belgium	Carpet (i)	(Australia) Peter McNamara	4–6, 6–4, 6–7
Loss	17.	1983	Dallas WCT Finals, U.S.	Carpet (i)	(United States) John McEnroe	2–6, 6–4, 3–6, 7–6, 6–7
Loss	18.	1983	US Open, New York City	Hard	(United States) Jimmy Connors	3–6, 7–6, 5–7, 0–6
Loss	19.	1983	Australian Open, Melbourne	Grass	(Sweden) Mats Wilander	1–6, 4–6, 4–6
Loss	20.	1983	Volvo Masters, New York City	Carpet (i)	(United States) John McEnroe	3–6, 4–6, 4–6
Loss	21.	1984	Philadelphia, U.S.	Carpet (i)	(United States) John McEnroe	3–6, 6–3, 3–6, 6–7
Loss	22.	1984	Brussels Indoor, Belgium	Carpet (i)	(United States) John McEnroe	1–6, 3–6
Loss	23.	1984	Rotterdam, Netherlands	Carpet (i)	(United States) Jimmy Connors	6–0, 1–0 (abandoned bomb scare)
Loss	24.	1984	Forest Hills WCT, U.S.	Clay	(United States) John McEnroe	4–6, 2–6
Loss	25.	1984	US Open, New York City	Hard	(United States) John McEnroe	3–6, 4–6, 1-6
Loss	26.	1984	Sydney Indoor, Australia	Hard (i)	(Sweden) Anders Järryd	3–6, 2–6, 4–6
Loss	27.	1984	Tokyo Indoor, Japan	Carpet (i)	(United States) Jimmy Connors	4–6, 6–3, 0–6
Loss	28.	1984	Volvo Masters, New York City	Carpet (i)	(United States) John McEnroe	5–7, 0–6, 4–6
Loss	29.	1985	French Open, Paris	Clay	(Sweden) Mats Wilander	6–3, 4–6, 2–6, 2–6
Loss	30.	1985	Stratton Mountain, U.S.	Hard	(United States) John McEnroe	6–7, 2–6
Loss	31.	1985	Montreal, Canada	Hard	(United States) John McEnroe	5–7, 3–6
Loss	32.	1986	Chicago, U.S.	Carpet (i)	(Germany) Boris Becker	6–7, 3–6
Loss	33.	1986	Wimbledon, London	Grass	(Germany) Boris Becker	4–6, 3–6, 5–7
Loss	34.	1986	Sydney Indoor, Australia	Hard (i)	(Germany) Boris Becker	6–3, 6–7, 2–6, 0–6
Loss	35.	1987	Miami, U.S.	Hard	(Czechoslovakia) Miloslav Mečíř	5–7, 2–6, 5–7
Loss	36.	1987	Wimbledon, London	Grass	(Australia) Pat Cash	6–7, 2–6, 5–7
Loss	37.	1987	Stratton Mountain, USA	Hard	(United States) John McEnroe	6–7, 4–1 (abandoned rain)
Loss	38.	1987	Tokyo Indoor, Japan	Carpet (i)	(Sweden) Stefan Edberg	7–6, 4–6, 4–6
Loss	39.	1988	US Open, New York City	Hard	(Sweden) Mats Wilander	4–6, 6–3, 3–6, 7–5, 4–6
Loss	40.	1988	Nabisco Masters, New York City	Carpet (i)	(Germany) Boris Becker	7–5, 6–7, 6–3, 2–6, 6–7
Loss	41.	1989	Tokyo Outdoor, Japan	Hard	(Sweden) Stefan Edberg	3–6, 6–2, 4–6
Loss	42.	1989	US Open, New York City	Hard	(Germany) Boris Becker	6–7, 6–1, 3–6, 6–7
Loss	43.	1990	Stuttgart Indoor, Germany	Carpet (i)	(Germany) Boris Becker	2–6, 2–6
Loss	44.	1991	Australian Open, Melbourne	Hard	(Germany) Boris Becker	6–1, 4–6, 4–6, 4–6
Loss	45.	1991	Rotterdam, Netherlands	Carpet (i)	(Italy) Omar Camporese	6–3, 6–7, 6–7
Loss	46.	1991	Tokyo Outdoor, Japan	Hard	(Sweden) Stefan Edberg	1–6, 5–7, 0–6
Loss	47.	1992	Toronto, Canada	Hard	(United States) Andre Agassi	6–3, 2–6, 0–6
Loss	48.	1992	Cincinnati, U.S.	Hard	(United States) Pete Sampras	3–6, 6–3, 3–6
Loss	49.	1992	Long Island, U.S.	Hard	(Czechoslovakia) Petr Korda	2–6, 2–6
Loss	50.	1993	Philadelphia, U.S.	Carpet (i)	(Australia) Mark Woodforde	4–5, ret.
Loss	51.	1993	Nice, France	Clay	(Germany) Marc-Kevin Goellner	6–1, 4–6, 2–6
Loss	52.	1994	Sydney Outdoor, Australia	Hard	(United States) Pete Sampras	6–7^{(5–7)}, 4–6

=== Other (non-ATP, invitational & special events) singles finals ===
Here are Lendl's tournament finals that are not included in the statistics on the Association of Tennis Professionals website. It includes non-ATP tournaments such as special, invitational and exhibition events.

==== Other singles titles - Draw at least 8 players (38) ====
Year	Date	Tournament	Surface	Opponent	Score	Winners prize
1980	Sept 10–14	São Paulo - Brazil Invitational Cup	Clay	(United States) Gene Mayer	6–3, 7–5	
1981	Feb 25–27	Genoa - Bitti Bergamo Memorial	Carpet	(South Africa) Johan Kriek	6–2, 6–2	
1981	Aug 26–30	White Plains - AMF Head Cup	Hard	(Romania) Ilie Năstase	W/O	$50,000
1981	Nov 23–29	Milan - Master Brooklyn Chewing Gum	Carpet	(United States) John McEnroe	6–4, 2–6, 6–4	$85,000
1982	Feb 4–7	Toronto - Molson Light Challenge	Carpet	(United States) John McEnroe	7–5, 3–6, 7–6, 7–5	$125,000
1982	Oct 19–24	Melbourne - Mazda Super Challenge	Carpet	(United States) Vitas Gerulaitis	6–2, 6–2, 7–5	$100,000
1982	Nov 30 – Dec 5	Antwerp - European Champions' Championship	Carpet	(United States) John McEnroe	3–6, 7–6, 6–3, 6–3	$200,000
1983	Jan 10–16	Rosemont - Lite Challenge of Champions	Carpet	(United States) Jimmy Connors	4–6, 6–4, 7–5, 6–4	$100,000
1984	Jan 30 – Feb 5	Toronto - Molson Light Challenge	Carpet	(France) Yannick Noah	6–0, 6–2, 6–4	$100,000
1984	Aug 20–26	Jericho - Hamlet Challenge Cup	Hard	(Ecuador) Andrés Gómez	6–2, 6–4	$35,000
1984	Nov 12–18	Antwerp - European Champions' Championship	Carpet	(Sweden) Anders Järryd	6–2, 6–1, 6–2	$200,000
1985	Aug 19–25	Jericho - Executone Hamlet Challenge Cup	Hard	(United States) Jimmy Connors	6–1, 6–3	$35,000
1985	Oct 28 – Nov 3	Antwerp - European Champions' Championship	Carpet	(United States) John McEnroe	1–6, 7–6, 6–2, 6–2	$200,000*
1986	Jan 6–12	Atlanta - AT&T Challenge of Champions	Carpet	(United States) Jimmy Connors	6–2, 6–3	$150,000
1986	Apr 28 – May 4	Ede - Audi Championship	Clay	(Sweden) Stefan Edberg	7–6, 6–3	$140,000
1986	Aug 19–24	Jericho - Norstar Bank Hamlet Challenge Cup	Hard	(United States) John McEnroe	6–2, 6–4	$35,000
1987	May 7–10	Ede - Audi Championship	Clay	(Italy) Paolo Canè	7–6, 6–3	
1987	Jul 22–26	Stowe - Head Classic	Hard	(United States) Jimmy Arias	6–3, 6–3	$30,000
1987	Oct 27 – Nov 1	Antwerp - European Community Championship	Carpet	(Czechoslovakia) Miloslav Mečíř	5–7, 6–1, 6–4, 6–3	$250,000
1988	Jan 7–9	Gold Coast - Sanctuary Cove Classic	Hard	(Australia) Wally Masur	6–7, 7–6, 6–4	
1988	April 28 – May 1	Atlanta - AT&T Challenge of Champions	Clay	(Sweden) Stefan Edberg	2–6, 6–1, 6–3	$150,000
1988	May 2–8	Ede - Audi Championship	Clay	(Australia) John Frawley	6–2, 6–3	
1989	Dec 28 – Jan 1	Newcastle - N.S.W. Invitational	Hard	(Germany) Carl-Uwe Steeb	6–3, 7–6	
1989	Feb 6–12	Chicago - Volvo Tennis	Carpet	(United States) Brad Gilbert	6–2, 7–6	$60,000
1989	Aug 21–27	Jericho - Norstar Bank Hamlet Challenge Cup	Hard	(Sweden) Mikael Pernfors	4–6, 6–2, 6–4	$40,000
1989	Oct 2–7	Stuttgart - Eurocard Classic	Carpet	(Czechoslovakia) Miloslav Mečíř	6–3, 4–6, 4–6, 6–1, 6–4	
1989	Oct 19–22	Essen - Germany Invitational	Carpet	(Czechoslovakia) Miloslav Mečíř	6–4, 6–2	
1989	Oct 23–29	Antwerp - European Community Championship	Carpet	(Czechoslovakia) Miloslav Mečíř	6–2, 6–2, 1–6, 6–4	$250,000
1990	Jun 4–10	Beckenham, Kent Grass Court Championships	Grass	(Australia) Darren Cahill	6–3, 7–5	
1990	Aug 20–26	Forest Hills, New York - WCT Tournament of Champions	Hard	(United States) Aaron Krickstein	6–4, 6–7, 6–3	$100,000
1990	Oct 17–21	Hong Kong - Marlboro Championships	Carpet	(United States) Michael Chang	1–6, 6–2, 6–1, 6–2	$200,000
1991	Jan 2–6	Salamander Bay - Roche Racquet Classic	Hard	(Germany) Carl-Uwe Steeb	6–4, 6–2	
1991	Jun 3–9	Beckenham, Kent Grass Court Championships	Grass	(Australia) Pat Cash	3–6, 7–6, 7–6	
1991	Oct 16–20	Hong Kong - Marlboro Championships	Carpet	(United States) David Wheaton	6–3, 7–5, 6–1	$200,000
1992	Jul 27 – Aug 2	Brookline - U.S. Pro Championships	Hard	(United States) Richey Reneberg	6–3, 6–3	$50,000
1992	Oct 19–25	Hong Kong - Marlboro Championships	Carpet	(United States) Michael Chang	6–3, 4–6, 6–4, 6–4	$200,000
1993	Jul 13–18	Brookline - U.S. Pro Championships	Hard	(United States) Todd Martin	5–7, 6–3, 7–6	$50,000
1994	Jul 12–17	Brookline - U.S. Pro Championships	Hard	(United States) MaliVai Washington	7–5, 7–6	$50,000

==== Other singles titles - Draw less than 8 players (19) ====
Below are Lendl's winnings on exhibition tournaments (usually 4-men's draw)

Year	Date	Tournament	Surface	Opponent	Score	Winners prize
1981	Nov 4–5	Calcutta - Indian Classic Cup	Hard	(Australia) John Alexander	6–4, 6–2	
1981	Nov 7–8	Jakarta - Indonesian Grand Prix Tennis	Hard	(Poland) Wojciech Fibak	6–1, 7–6	
1983	Nov 16–17	Luxembourg	Carpet	(United States) John McEnroe	6–4, 6–2	
1984	Jan 20–22	San Juan - Governors Cup	Carpet	(United States) Gene Mayer	6–3, 6–2	$80,000
1984	Apr 7–8	Tokyo - Suntory Cup	Carpet	(United States) John McEnroe	6–4, 3–6, 6–2	$110,000
1985	Apr 20–21	Tokyo - Suntory Cup	Carpet	(United States) John McEnroe	6–4, 6–2	$110,000
1985	Oct 8–9	East Rutherford - Meadowlands Challenge	Hard	(United States) John McEnroe	7–5, 6–4	
1985	Nov 21–23	Canberra - Rio International Challenge	Carpet	(United States) Tim Mayotte	6–4, 6–4	
1986	July 24	Inglewood - The Forum Championships Tennis Challenge Series	Carpet	(United States) John McEnroe	6–4, 3–6, 7-6	$100,000
1987	May 5–6	Barcelona - Royal Polo Club	Clay	(United States) John McEnroe	6–2, 3–6, 6–2	
1987	Nov 25–29	West Palm Beach - The Stakes Matches	Hard	(Australia) Pat Cash	11–21, 21–18, 21–7, 22–20	$583,200
1988	Jul 21–24	Monterey - Hartmarx Racquet Club Apparel Tennis Classic	Hard	(South Africa) Kevin Curren	6–4, 7–6	
1989	May 27–28	Marseille - Charity Matches Invitational	Clay	(United States) Andre Agassi	6–3, 6–3	
1989	Oct 24–25	Bologna - All Stars Tennis Classic	Carpet	(United States) John McEnroe	6–4, 7–5	
1990	Nov 10–11	Rome - Big Four Tennis	Carpet	(Sweden) Stefan Edberg	5–7, 7–6, 7–6	
1990	Nov 12	Milan - Muratti Shoot Out Tie-Break	Carpet	(Sweden) Jonas Svensson	(7–5), (5–7), (7–4)	$200,000
1990	Dec 3–5	Bolzano - Ebel Tennis Trophy	Carpet	(Socialist Federal Republic of Yugoslavia) Goran Ivanišević	6–2, 7–6	
1990	Dec 8–9	Zurich - Swiss Invitational Tennis Cup	Carpet	(United States) Pete Sampras	3–6, 7–6, 6–4	
1991	Nov 29 – Dec 1	São Paulo - Transcontinental Tennis Cup	Hard	(United States) Jimmy Connors	C.retired in 3rd set	

=== Doubles (6 titles, 10 runner-ups) ===
Result	W/L	Date	Tournament	Surface	Partner	Opponents	Score	Ref.
Loss	0–1	May 1979	Florence, Italy	Clay	(Czechoslovakia) Pavel Složil	(Italy) Paolo Bertolucci (Italy) Adriano Panatta	4–6, 3–6	
Win	1–1	Jun 1979	Berlin, West Germany	Clay	(Brazil) Carlos Kirmayr	(Venezuela) Jorge Andrew (Czechoslovakia) Stanislav Birner	6–2, 6–1	
Loss	1–2	Aug 1980	Indianapolis, US	Clay	(Poland) Wojciech Fibak	(South Africa) Kevin Curren (United States) Steve Denton	6–3, 6–7, 4–6	
Loss	1–2	Aug 1980	Cincinnati, US	Hard	(Poland) Wojciech Fibak	(United States) Bruce Manson (United States) Brian Teacher	7–6, 5–7, 4–6	
Win	2–3	Oct 1980	Barcelona, Spain	Clay	(United States) Steve Denton	(Czechoslovakia) Pavel Složil (Hungary) Balázs Taróczy	6–2, 6–7, 6–3	
Loss	2–4	Sep 1983	San Francisco, U.S.	Carpet (i)	(United States) Vincent Van Patten	(United States) Peter Fleming (United States) John McEnroe	1–6, 2–6	
Win	3–4	Nov 1984	Wembley, England	Carpet (i)	(Ecuador) Andrés Gómez	(Czechoslovakia) Pavel Složil (Czechoslovakia) Tomáš Šmíd	6–2, 6–2	
Win	4–4	Sep 1985	Stuttgart, West Germany	Clay	(Czechoslovakia) Tomáš Šmíd	(United States) Andy Kohlberg (Brazil) João Soares	3–6, 6–4, 6–2	
Win	5–4	Mar 1986	Ft. Myers, U.S.	Hard	(Ecuador) Andrés Gómez	(Australia) Peter Doohan (Australia) Paul McNamee	7–5, 6–4	
Loss	5–5	Oct 1986	Tokyo Indoor, Japan	Carpet (i)	(Ecuador) Andrés Gómez	(United States) Mike De Palmer (United States) Gary Donnelly	3–6, 5–7	
Win	6–5	Jan 1987	Adelaide, Australia	Grass	(United States) Bill Scanlon	(Australia) Peter Doohan (Australia) Laurie Warder	6–7, 6–3, 6–4	
Loss	6–6	Apr 1988	Monte-Carlo, Monaco	Clay	(France) Henri Leconte	(Spain) Sergio Casal (Spain) Emilio Sánchez	0–6, 3–6	
Loss	6–7	Jun 1990	Queen's Club, England	Grass	(France) Henri Leconte	(United Kingdom) Jeremy Bates (United States) Kevin Curren	2–6, 6–7	
Loss	6–8	Oct 1990	Sydney Indoor, Australia	Hard (i)	(Sweden) Stefan Edberg	(Australia) Broderick Dyke (Sweden) Peter Lundgren	2–6, 4–6	
Loss	6–9	Apr 1992	Barcelona, Spain	Clay	(Czech Republic) Karel Nováček	(Ecuador) Andrés Gómez (Spain) Javier Sánchez	4–6, 4–6	
Loss	6–10	Feb 1993	Marseille, France	Carpet (i)	(South Africa) Christo van Rensburg	(France) Arnaud Boetsch (France) Olivier Delaître	3–6, 6–7	

== Record against No. 1 players ==
Lendl's match record against players who have been ranked world No. 1.

Player	Years	Matches	Wins	Losses	Win %	Ref.
(United States) Andre Agassi	1987–1993	8	6	2	75%	
(Germany) Boris Becker	1985–1993	21	11	10	52%	
(Sweden) Björn Borg	1979–1981	7	2	5	28%	
(United States) Jimmy Connors	1979–1992	35	22	13	63%	
(United States) Jim Courier	1989–1991	4	4	0	100	
(Sweden) Stefan Edberg	1984–1992	27	13	14	48%	
(United States) John McEnroe	1980–1992	36	21	15	58%	
(United States) Pete Sampras	1990–1994	8	3	5	38%	
(Sweden) Mats Wilander	1982–1994	22	15	7	68%	

== Career prize money statistics ==
Year	Rank	Prize Money	ITD Prize Money
1978	–	$0	$0
1979	47	$77,401	$77,401
1980	3	$583,906	$661,307
1981	2	$846,037	$1,507,344
1982	1	$2,028,850	$3,536,194
1983	1	$1,747,128	$5,283,322
1984	2	$1,060,196	$6,343,518
1985	1	$1,963,074	$8,306,592
1986	1	$1,987,537	$10,294,129
1987	1	$2,003,656	$12,297,785
1988	4	$983,938	$13,281,723
1989	1	$2,344,367	$15,626,090
1990	6	$1,445,742	$17,071,832
1991	4	$1,888,985	$18,960,817
1992	11	$961,566	$19,922,383
1993	11	$1,075,876	$20,998,259
1994	71	$263,914	$21,262,173

== Top 10 wins ==
Season	1978	1979	1980	1981	1982	1983	1984	1985	1986	1987	1988	1989	1990	1991	1992	1993	1994	Total
Wins	0	1	14	18	15	8	12	22	14	16	6	11	8	9	7	3	0	164

#	Player	Rank	Event	Surface	Rd	Score	LR
1979
1.	(United States) Arthur Ashe	10	French Open, Paris, France	Clay	3R	5–7, 7–6, 6–2, 6–3	48
1980
2.	(United States) Roscoe Tanner	6	Washington, D.C., United States	Carpet (i)	QF	6–4, 6–4	22
3.	(United States) Eddie Dibbs	10	Washington, D.C., United States	Carpet (i)	SF	7–5, 6–4	22
4.	(Spain) José Higueras	7	Houston, United States	Clay	QF	6–3, 6–3	18
5.	(United States) Eddie Dibbs	9	Houston, United States	Clay	F	6–1, 6–3	18
6.	(Sweden) Björn Borg	2	Toronto, Canada	Hard	F	4–6, 5–4, ret.	10
7.	(United States) Harold Solomon	6	US Open, New York, United States	Hard	4R	6–1, 6–0, 6–0	9
8.	(Argentina) Guillermo Vilas	4	Davis Cup, Buenos Aires, Argentina	Clay	RR	7–5, 8–6, 9–7	8
9.	(Argentina) José Luis Clerc	10	Davis Cup, Buenos Aires, Argentina	Clay	RR	6–1, 7–5, 6–8, 6–2	8
10.	(Argentina) Guillermo Vilas	5	Barcelona, Spain	Clay	F	6–4, 5–7, 6–4, 4–6, 6–1	7
11.	(Sweden) Björn Borg	1	Basel, Switzerland	Hard (i)	F	6–3, 6–2, 5–7, 0–6, 6–4	7
12.	(United States) Eliot Teltscher	10	Tokyo, Japan	Clay	F	3–6, 6–4, 6–0	7
13.	(Argentina) Guillermo Vilas	5	Masters, New York, United States	Carpet (i)	RR	7–5, 6–4	6
14.	(United States) Harold Solomon	7	Masters, New York, United States	Carpet (i)	RR	6–3, 6–1	6
15.	(United States) Gene Mayer	4	Masters, New York, United States	Carpet (i)	SF	6–3, 6–4	6
1981
16.	(United States) Harold Solomon	7	La Quinta, United States	Hard	SF	6–1, 6–2	6
17.	(United States) Harold Solomon	7	Las Vegas, United States	Hard	F	6–4, 6–2	6
18.	(Argentina) Guillermo Vilas	5	Nations Cup, Düsseldorf, West Germany	Clay	RR	7–5, 6–4	6
19.	(United States) Harold Solomon	7	Nations Cup, Düsseldorf, West Germany	Clay	SF	6–4, 6–2	6
20.	(United States) John McEnroe	3	French Open, Paris, France	Clay	QF	6–4, 6–4, 7–5	5
21.	(Argentina) José Luis Clerc	7	French Open, Paris, France	Clay	SF	3–6, 6–4, 4–6, 7–6, 6–2	5
22.	(United States) John McEnroe	1	Davis Cup, New York, United States	Hard	RR	6–4, 14–12, 7–5	4
23.	(Australia) Peter McNamara	8	Stuttgart, Germany	Clay	SF	6–2, 2–6, 6–4	4
24.	(United States) Harold Solomon	10	North Conway, United States	Clay	QF	6–3, 6–2	4
25.	(Argentina) Guillermo Vilas	6	Indianapolis, United States	Clay	SF	6–3, 7–5	5
26.	(United States) Brian Teacher	9	Montreal, Canada	Hard	QF	6–1, 6–1	4
27.	(Argentina) Guillermo Vilas	6	Barcelona, Spain	Clay	F	6–0, 6–3, 6–0	4
28.	(Argentina) José Luis Clerc	5	Basel, Switzerland	Hard (i)	F	6–2, 6–3, 6–0	4
29.	(Argentina) Guillermo Vilas	6	Buenos Aires, Argentina	Clay	F	6–1, 6–2	4
30.	(Argentina) Guillermo Vilas	6	Masters, New York, United States	Carpet (i)	RR	6–4, 6–1	2
31.	(United States) Vitas Gerulaitis	9	Masters, New York, United States	Carpet (i)	RR	4–6, 7–5, 6–2	2
32.	(United States) John McEnroe	1	Masters, New York, United States	Carpet (i)	SF	6–4, 6–2	2
33.	(United States) Vitas Gerulaitis	9	Masters, New York, United States	Carpet (i)	F	6–7^{(5–7)}, 2–6, 7–6^{(8–6)}, 6–2, 6–4	2
1982
34.	(United States) Eliot Teltscher	8	Delray Beach, United States	Clay	SF	6–2, 3–6, 6–4	2
35.	(Australia) Peter McNamara	10	Delray Beach, United States	Clay	F	6–4, 4–6, 6–4, 7–5	2
36.	(United States) Vitas Gerulaitis	9	Genova, Italy	Carpet (i)	F	6–7, 6–4, 6–4, 6–3	3
37.	(South Africa) Johan Kriek	8	Munich, West Germany	Carpet (i)	SF	6–4, 6–3	3
38.	(United States) Sandy Mayer	10	Strasbourg, France	Carpet (i)	SF	6–4, 6–3	3
39.	(Argentina) José Luis Clerc	5	Houston, United States	Clay	F	3–6, 7–6, 6–0, 1–4, ret.	2
40.	(United States) John McEnroe	1	WCT Finals, Dallas, United States	Carpet (i)	F	6–2, 3–6, 6–3, 6–3	2
41.	(Argentina) José Luis Clerc	5	Forest Hills, United States	Clay	SF	6–2, 7–5	3
42.	(Argentina) José Luis Clerc	5	North Conway, United States	Clay	SF	6–4, 2–6, 6–4	4
43.	(United States) John McEnroe	1	Toronto, Canada	Hard	SF	6–4, 6–4	4
44.	(United States) Jimmy Connors	2	Cincinnati, United States	Hard	SF	6–1, 6–1	4
45.	(United States) John McEnroe	1	US Open, New York, United States	Hard	SF	6–4, 6–4, 7–6	3
46.	(France) Yannick Noah	9	Masters, New York, United States	Carpet (i)	QF	6–4, 7–5	3
47.	(United States) Jimmy Connors	2	Masters, New York, United States	Carpet (i)	SF	6–3, 6–1	3
48.	(United States) John McEnroe	1	Masters, New York, United States	Carpet (i)	F	6–4, 6–4, 6–2	3
1983
49.	(Argentina) Guillermo Vilas	4	Detroit, United States	Carpet (i)	F	7–5, 6–2, 2–6, 6–4	3
50.	(Sweden) Mats Wilander	9	Brussels, Belgium	Carpet (i)	SF	7–6, 7–6	1
51.	(Argentina) Guillermo Vilas	4	Hilton Head, United States	Clay	F	6–2, 6–1, 6–0	1
52.	(United States) Jimmy Connors	3	Montreal, Canada	Hard	SF	6–1, 6–3	2
53.	(Sweden) Mats Wilander	5	US Open, New York, United States	Hard	QF	6–4, 6–4, 7–6	2
54.	(United States) Jimmy Arias	9	US Open, New York, United States	Hard	SF	6–2, 7–6, 6–1	2
55.	(United States) John McEnroe	1	San Francisco, United States	Carpet (i)	F	3–6, 7–6^{(7–4)}, 6–4	2
56.	(United States) Jimmy Connors	3	Masters, New York, United States	Carpet (i)	SF	6–3, 6–4	1
1984
57.	(France) Yannick Noah	5	Philadelphia, United States	Carpet (i)	SF	6–3, 6–4	1
58.	(United States) Jimmy Connors	3	Hilton Head, United States	Clay	SF	6–0, 6–0	2
59.	(Sweden) Mats Wilander	4	World Team Cup, Düsseldorf, West Germany	Clay	RR	7–6, 7–5	2
60.	(Ecuador) Andrés Gómez	7	French Open, Paris, France	Clay	QF	6–3, 6–7, 6–4, 6–3	2
61.	(Sweden) Mats Wilander	4	French Open, Paris, France	Clay	SF	6–3, 6–3, 7–5	2
62.	(United States) John McEnroe	1	French Open, Paris, France	Clay	F	3–6, 2–6, 6–4, 7–5, 7–5	2
63.	(Sweden) Anders Järryd	10	US Open, New York, United States	Hard	4R	6–2, 6–2, 6–4	2
64.	(Ecuador) Andrés Gómez	5	US Open, New York, United States	Hard	QF	6–4, 6–4, 6–1	2
65.	(United States) Eliot Teltscher	8	Sydney, Australia	Hard (i)	SF	6–1, 6–1	3
66.	(United States) Jimmy Connors	2	Wembley, London, United Kingdom	Carpet (i)	SF	6–4, 6–2	3
67.	(Ecuador) Andrés Gómez	5	Wembley, London, United Kingdom	Carpet (i)	F	7–6^{(7–1)}, 6–2, 6–1	3
68.	(United States) Jimmy Connors	2	Masters, New York, United States	Carpet (i)	SF	7–5, 6–7, 7–5	3
1985
69.	(United States) Jimmy Connors	2	Fort Myers, United States	Hard	F	6–3, 6–2	3
70.	(Sweden) Henrik Sundström	7	Monte Carlo, Monaco	Clay	SF	4–6, 7–6, 7–6	3
71.	(Sweden) Mats Wilander	4	Monte Carlo, Monaco	Clay	F	6–1, 6–3, 4–6, 6–4	3
72.	(United States) Jimmy Connors	3	WCT Finals, Dallas, United States	Carpet (i)	SF	6–3, 2–1, ret.	2
73.	(United States) Aaron Krickstein	7	Forest Hills, United States	Clay	SF	6–1, 2–6, 6–1	2
74.	(United States) John McEnroe	1	Forest Hills, United States	Clay	F	6–3, 6–3	2
75.	(Sweden) Mats Wilander	4	World Team Cup, Düsseldorf, West Germany	Clay	RR	6–4, 6–3	2
76.	(United States) John McEnroe	1	World Team Cup, Düsseldorf, West Germany	Clay	F	6–7, 7–6, 6–3	2
77.	(United States) Jimmy Connors	3	French Open, Paris, France	Clay	SF	6–2, 6–3, 6–1	2
78.	(West Germany) Boris Becker	10	Indianapolis, United States	Clay	SF	5–7, 6–2, 6–2	2
79.	(Ecuador) Andrés Gómez	7	Indianapolis, United States	Clay	F	6–1, 6–3	2
80.	(Ecuador) Andrés Gómez	8	Davis Cup, Guayaquil, Ecuador	Clay	RR	5–3, ret.	2
81.	(United States) Jimmy Connors	4	Stratton Mountain, United States	Hard	SF	6–0, 4–6, 6–4	2
82.	(Sweden) Anders Järryd	6	Montreal, Canada	Hard	QF	6–1, 6–0	2
83.	(France) Yannick Noah	6	US Open, New York, United States	Hard	QF	6–2, 6–2, 6–4	2
84.	(United States) Jimmy Connors	4	US Open, New York, United States	Hard	SF	6–2, 6–3, 7–5	2
85.	(United States) John McEnroe	1	US Open, New York, United States	Hard	F	7–6^{(7–1)}, 6–3, 6–4	2
86.	(West Germany) Boris Becker	5	Tokyo, Japan	Carpet (i)	SF	6–3, 7–6^{(7–1)}	1
87.	(Sweden) Mats Wilander	3	Tokyo, Japan	Carpet (i)	F	6–0, 6–4	1
88.	(United States) Johan Kriek	10	Wembley, London, United Kingdom	Carpet (i)	QF	6–2, 6–1	1
89.	(West Germany) Boris Becker	5	Wembley, London, United Kingdom	Carpet (i)	F	6–7^{(6–8)}, 6–3, 4–6, 6–4, 6–4	1
90.	(West Germany) Boris Becker	6	Masters, New York, United States	Carpet (i)	F	6–2, 7–6^{(7–1)}, 6–3	1
1986
91.	(United States) Jimmy Connors	4	Boca West, United States	Hard	SF	1–6, 6–1, 6–2, 2–6, 5–2, def.	1
92.	(Sweden) Mats Wilander	3	Boca West, United States	Hard	F	3–6, 6–1, 7–6^{(7–5)}, 6–4	1
93.	(Sweden) Joakim Nyström	8	Milan, Italy	Carpet (i)	F	6–2, 6–2, 6–4	1
94.	(United States) Jimmy Connors	4	Fort Myers, United States	Hard	F	6–2, 6–0	1
95.	(France) Yannick Noah	4	Rome, Italy	Clay	SF	1–6, 6–2, 7–6	1
96.	(United States) Jimmy Connors	5	Stratton Mountain, United States	Hard	SF	6–4, 3–6, 6–2	1
97.	(West Germany) Boris Becker	3	Stratton Mountain, United States	Hard	F	6–4, 7–6^{(7–0)}	1
98.	(France) Henri Leconte	8	US Open, New York, United States	Hard	QF	7–6, 6–1, 1–6, 6–1	1
99.	(Sweden) Stefan Edberg	4	US Open, New York, United States	Hard	SF	7–6, 6–2, 6–3	1
100.	(France) Yannick Noah	5	Masters, New York, United States	Carpet (i)	RR	6–4, 6–4	1
101.	(Ecuador) Andrés Gómez	10	Masters, New York, United States	Carpet (i)	RR	6–3, 7–5	1
102.	(Sweden) Stefan Edberg	4	Masters, New York, United States	Carpet (i)	RR	6–3, 6–4	1
103.	(Sweden) Mats Wilander	3	Masters, New York, United States	Carpet (i)	SF	6–4, 6–2	1
104.	(West Germany) Boris Becker	2	Masters, New York, United States	Carpet (i)	F	6–4, 6–4, 6–4	1
1987
105.	(United States) Jimmy Connors	8	Miami, United States	Hard	SF	3–6, 7–6, 7–6, 6–3	1
106.	(Czechoslovakia) Miloslav Mečíř	5	Hamburg, West Germany	Clay	F	6–1, 6–3, 6–3	1
107.	(Ecuador) Andrés Gómez	10	French Open, Paris, France	Clay	QF	5–7, 6–4, 6–1, 6–1	1
108.	(Czechoslovakia) Miloslav Mečíř	5	French Open, Paris, France	Clay	SF	6–3, 6–3, 7–6	1
109.	(Sweden) Mats Wilander	4	French Open, Paris, France	Clay	F	7–5, 6–2, 3–6, 7–6^{(7–3)}	1
110.	(Sweden) Stefan Edberg	4	Wimbledon, London, United Kingdom	Grass	SF	3–6, 6–4, 7–6^{(10–8)}, 6–4	1
111.	(United States) Jimmy Connors	6	Washington, D.C., United States	Hard	SF	6–4, 7–6	1
112.	(United States) Jimmy Connors	6	Montreal, Canada	Hard	SF	7–5, 6–4	1
113.	(Sweden) Stefan Edberg	3	Montreal, Canada	Hard	F	6–4, 7–6^{(7–2)}	1
114.	(United States) John McEnroe	9	US Open, New York, United States	Hard	QF	6–3, 6–3, 6–4	1
115.	(United States) Jimmy Connors	6	US Open, New York, United States	Hard	SF	6–4, 6–2, 6–2	1
116.	(Sweden) Mats Wilander	3	US Open, New York, United States	Hard	F	6–7^{(7–9)}, 6–0, 7–6^{(7–4)}, 6–4	1
117.	(Australia) Pat Cash	8	Sydney, Australia	Hard (i)	F	6–4, 6–2, 6–4	1
118.	(United States) Jimmy Connors	4	Masters, New York, United States	Carpet (i)	RR	4–3, ret.	1
119.	(West Germany) Boris Becker	5	Masters, New York, United States	Carpet (i)	RR	6–4, 6–7, 6–3	1
120.	(Sweden) Mats Wilander	3	Masters, New York, United States	Carpet (i)	F	6–2, 6–2, 6–3	1
1988
121.	(France) Yannick Noah	8	Monte Carlo, Monaco	Clay	SF	4–6, 7–6, 6–3	1
122.	(United States) Jimmy Connors	6	Toronto, Canada	Hard	SF	6–4, 6–4	1
123.	(United States) Andre Agassi	4	US Open, New York, United States	Hard	SF	4–6, 6–2, 6–3, 6–4	1
124.	(United States) Tim Mayotte	10	Masters, New York, United States	Carpet (i)	RR	6–2, 3–6, 6–3	2
125.	(United States) Andre Agassi	3	Masters, New York, United States	Carpet (i)	RR	1–6, 7–6, 6–3	2
126.	(Sweden) Stefan Edberg	5	Masters, New York, United States	Carpet (i)	SF	6–3, 7–6	2
1989
127.	(Switzerland) Jakob Hlasek	9	WCT Finals, Dallas, United States	Carpet (i)	QF	7–6, 1–6, 7–6, 6–7, 7–6	1
128.	(Sweden) Stefan Edberg	4	Scottsdale, United States	Hard	F	6–2, 6–3	1
129.	(United States) Andre Agassi	5	Forest Hills, United States	Clay	SF	6–2, 6–3	1
130.	(United States) Andre Agassi	7	Montreal, Canada	Hard	SF	6–2, 3–6, 6–4	1
131.	(United States) John McEnroe	5	Montreal, Canada	Hard	F	6–1, 6–3	1
132.	(United States) Tim Mayotte	10	US Open, New York, United States	Hard	QF	6–4, 6–0, 6–1	1
133.	(United States) Andre Agassi	6	US Open, New York, United States	Hard	SF	7–6, 6–1, 3–6, 6–1	1
134.	(Sweden) Stefan Edberg	3	Stockholm, Sweden	Carpet (i)	SF	6–0, 2–6, 6–3	1
135.	(United States) John McEnroe	4	Masters, New York, United States	Carpet (i)	RR	6–3, 6–3	1
136.	(United States) Aaron Krickstein	8	Masters, New York, United States	Carpet (i)	RR	6–1, 6–3	1
137.	(United States) Michael Chang	5	Masters, New York, United States	Carpet (i)	RR	6–1, 6–3	1
1990
138.	(Sweden) Stefan Edberg	3	Australian Open, Melbourne, Australia	Hard	F	4–6, 7–6^{(7–3)}, 5–2, ret.	1
139.	(United States) John McEnroe	4	Toronto, Canada	Carpet (i)	SF	6–3, 6–2	1
140.	(United States) John McEnroe	10	Queen's Club, London, United Kingdom	Grass	SF	6–2, 6–4	1
141.	(West Germany) Boris Becker	2	Queen's Club, London, United Kingdom	Grass	F	6–3, 6–2	1
142.	(Sweden) Stefan Edberg	1	Tokyo, Japan	Carpet (i)	SF	7–5, 6–3	3
143.	(Germany) Boris Becker	2	Tokyo, Japan	Carpet (i)	F	4–6, 6–3, 7–6^{(7–5)}	3
144.	(Austria) Thomas Muster	7	ATP Tour World Championships, Frankfurt, Germany	Carpet (i)	RR	6–3, 6–3	3
145.	(Ecuador) Andrés Gómez	6	ATP Tour World Championships, Frankfurt, Germany	Carpet (i)	RR	6–4, 6–1	3
1991
146.	(Sweden) Stefan Edberg	1	Australian Open, Melbourne, Australia	Hard	SF	6–4, 5–7, 3–6, 7–6^{(7–3)}, 6–4	3
147.	(United States) Brad Gilbert	7	Philadelphia, United States	Carpet (i)	SF	6–4, 3–6, 6–4	3
148.	(United States) Pete Sampras	5	Philadelphia, United States	Carpet (i)	F	5–7, 6–4, 6–4, 3–6, 6–3	3
149.	(United States) Jim Courier	8	Tokyo, Japan	Hard	SF	6–4, 6–1	3
150.	(Sweden) Stefan Edberg	2	Long Island, United States	Hard	F	6–3, 6–2	5
151.	(Germany) Michael Stich	4	US Open, New York, United States	Hard	QF	6–3, 3–6, 4–6, 7–6^{(7–5)}, 6–1	3
152.	(France) Guy Forget	6	ATP Tour World Championships, Frankfurt, Germany	Carpet (i)	RR	6–2, 6–4	5
153.	(United States) Jim Courier	2	ATP Tour World Championships, Frankfurt, Germany	Carpet (i)	RR	6–2, 6–3	5
154.	(Czechoslovakia) Karel Nováček	9	ATP Tour World Championships, Frankfurt, Germany	Carpet (i)	RR	6–2, 6–2	5
1992
155.	(Croatia) Goran Ivanišević	10	Brussels, Belgium	Carpet (i)	2R	6–7^{(5–7)}, 7–5, 6–4	6
156.	(United States) Michael Chang	5	Cincinnati, United States	Hard	SF	6–3, 6–2	11
157.	(United States) Michael Chang	4	New Haven, United States	Hard	QF	6–3, 7–6^{(9–7)}	7
158.	(United States) Michael Chang	4	Long Island, United States	Hard	SF	6–2, 6–3	9
159.	(Germany) Boris Becker	8	US Open, New York, United States	Hard	4R	6–7^{(4–7)}, 6–2, 6–7^{(4–7)}, 6–3, 6–4	7
160.	(Croatia) Goran Ivanišević	6	Tokyo, Japan	Carpet (i)	QF	6–3, 6–4	9
161.	(United States) Michael Chang	4	Tokyo, Japan	Carpet (i)	SF	6–3, 6–4	9
1993
162.	(United States) Pete Sampras	2	Philadelphia, United States	Carpet (i)	SF	7–6^{(7–4)}, 6–4	9
163.	(Czech Republic) Petr Korda	5	Nice, France	Clay	QF	1–6, 6–2, 6–0	8
164.	(Germany) Boris Becker	3	Tokyo, Japan	Carpet (i)	QF	6–3, 1–6, 7–6^{(7–2)}	18
