= 1982 World Championship Tennis circuit =

Tennis circuit

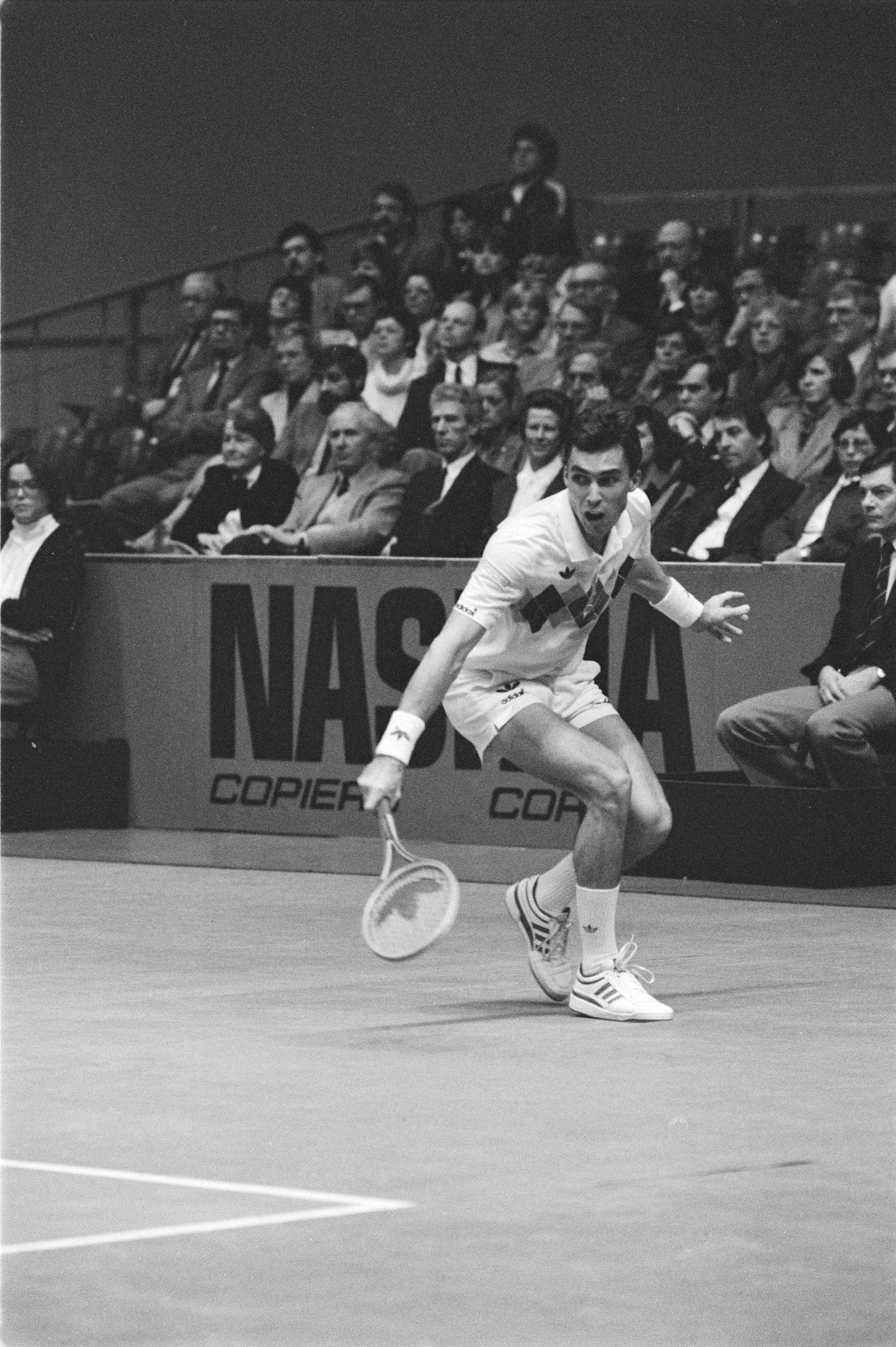
- Lendl won 11 titles

Details
- Duration: 19 January 1982 – 24 January 1983
- Edition: 11th
- Tournaments: 23

Achievements (singles)
- Most titles: (Czechoslovakia) Ivan Lendl (11)
- Most finals: (Czechoslovakia) Ivan Lendl (11)
- Prize money leader: (Czechoslovakia) Ivan Lendl ($1,349,000)
- Points leader: (Czechoslovakia) Ivan Lendl (481) ^{Spring} (Czechoslovakia) Ivan Lendl (920) ^{Summer/Fall} (Poland) Wojciech Fibak (1,420) ^{Winter}

The 1982 World Championship Tennis circuit was one of the two rival professional male tennis circuits of 1982. It was organized by World Championship Tennis (WCT).

On 30 April 1981 WCT announced its withdrawal from the Grand Prix circuit, into which it had been incorporated since the 1978 season, and the re-establishment of its own full calendar season for 1982. According to WCT owner Lamar Hunt the reasons for the withdrawal were the restrictions placed on them by the Men's Professional Council, the administrators of the Grand Prix circuit. The 1982 WCT circuit consisted of a Spring Tour, with nine tournaments, a Summer/Fall Tour, with five tournaments, and a Winter Tour with six tournaments. Each tour segment had its own finals tournament (Dallas, Naples and Detroit respectively). Total prize money, including bonuses, for the circuit was $7,933,000, which represented an increase of approximately $5 million compared to 1981.

== Calendar ==
=== Spring circuit ===
Week	Tournament	Champion	Runner-up	Semifinalists	Quarterfinalists
19 Jan	Mexico City WCT; Mexico City, Mexico; Carpet (i) – $300,000 – 32S/16D	(Czechoslovakia) Tomáš Šmíd; 3–6, 7–6, 4–6, 7–6, 6–2	(United States) John Sadri	(United States) Bruce Manson (Australia) Paul McNamee	(Argentina) José Luis Clerc (Hungary) Balázs Taróczy (United States) Terry Moor (United States) Tony Giammalva
19 Jan	Mexico City WCT; Mexico City, Mexico; Carpet (i) – $300,000 – 32S/16D	(United States) Ferdi Taygan (United States) Sherwood Stewart; 6–4, 7–5	(Czechoslovakia) Tomáš Šmíd (Hungary) Balázs Taróczy	(United States) Bruce Manson (Australia) Paul McNamee	(Argentina) José Luis Clerc (Hungary) Balázs Taróczy (United States) Terry Moor (United States) Tony Giammalva
25 Jan	Delray Beach WCT; Delray Beach, Florida, US; Clay – $300,000 – 32S/16D	(Czechoslovakia) Ivan Lendl; 6–4, 4–6, 6–4, 7–5	(Australia) Peter McNamara	(United States) Eliot Teltscher (Argentina) José Luis Clerc	(Australia) Paul McNamee (Australia) David Carter (Hungary) Balázs Taróczy (Spain) José Higueras
25 Jan	Delray Beach WCT; Delray Beach, Florida, US; Clay – $300,000 – 32S/16D	(United States) Eliot Teltscher (United States) Mel Purcell; 6–4, 7–6	(Czechoslovakia) Tomáš Šmíd (Hungary) Balázs Taróczy	(United States) Eliot Teltscher (Argentina) José Luis Clerc	(Australia) Paul McNamee (Australia) David Carter (Hungary) Balázs Taróczy (Spain) José Higueras
8 Feb	Richmond WCT; Richmond, Virginia, US; Carpet (i) – $300,000 – 16S/8D	(Argentina) José Luis Clerc; 3–6, 6–3, 6–4, 6–3	(United States) Fritz Buehning	(Poland) Wojciech Fibak (Australia) Mark Edmondson	(United States) Tom Cain (United States) John Sadri (Australia) Peter McNamara
8 Feb	Richmond WCT; Richmond, Virginia, US; Carpet (i) – $300,000 – 16S/8D	(Australia) Kim Warwick (Australia) Mark Edmondson; 6–4, 6–2	(Australia) Syd Ball (West Germany) Rolf Gehring	(Poland) Wojciech Fibak (Australia) Mark Edmondson	(United States) Tom Cain (United States) John Sadri (Australia) Peter McNamara
22 Feb	Genova WCT; Genova, Italy; Carpet (i) – $300,000 – 32S/16D	(Czechoslovakia) Ivan Lendl; 6–7, 6–4, 6–4, 6–3	(United States) Vitas Gerulaitis	(India) Vijay Amritraj (United Kingdom) Buster Mottram	(Poland) Wojciech Fibak (United States) Bill Scanlon (Hungary) Balázs Taróczy (Czechoslovakia) Tomáš Šmíd
22 Feb	Genova WCT; Genova, Italy; Carpet (i) – $300,000 – 32S/16D	(Czechoslovakia) Tomáš Šmíd (Czechoslovakia) Pavel Složil; 6–7, 7–5, 7–3	(United States) Mike Cahill (United Kingdom) Buster Mottram	(India) Vijay Amritraj (United Kingdom) Buster Mottram	(Poland) Wojciech Fibak (United States) Bill Scanlon (Hungary) Balázs Taróczy (Czechoslovakia) Tomáš Šmíd
8 Mar	Munich Cup; Munich, West Germany; Carpet (i) – $300,000 – 32S/16D	(Czechoslovakia) Ivan Lendl; 3–6, 6–3, 6–1, 6–2	(Czechoslovakia) Tomáš Šmíd	(South Africa) Johan Kriek (Switzerland) Heinz Günthardt	(United States) Terry Moor (India) Vijay Amritraj (Italy) Corrado Barazzutti (Poland) Wojciech Fibak
8 Mar	Munich Cup; Munich, West Germany; Carpet (i) – $300,000 – 32S/16D	(Czechoslovakia) Tomáš Šmíd (Australia) Mark Edmondson; 4–6, 7–5, 6–2	(South Africa) Kevin Curren (United States) Steve Denton	(South Africa) Johan Kriek (Switzerland) Heinz Günthardt	(United States) Terry Moor (India) Vijay Amritraj (Italy) Corrado Barazzutti (Poland) Wojciech Fibak
15 Mar	Strasbourg WCT; Strasbourg, France; Carpet (i) – $300,000 – 32S/16D	(Czechoslovakia) Ivan Lendl; 6–0, 7–5, 6–1	(United States) Tim Mayotte	(United States) Terry Moor (United States) Sandy Mayer	(Australia) John Fitzgerald (Hungary) Balázs Taróczy (Switzerland) Heinz Günthardt (Poland) Wojciech Fibak
15 Mar	Strasbourg WCT; Strasbourg, France; Carpet (i) – $300,000 – 32S/16D	(Australia) John Fitzgerald (Poland) Wojciech Fibak; 6–4, 6–3	(United States) Sandy Mayer (South Africa) Frew McMillan	(United States) Terry Moor (United States) Sandy Mayer	(Australia) John Fitzgerald (Hungary) Balázs Taróczy (Switzerland) Heinz Günthardt (Poland) Wojciech Fibak
28 Mar	Zurich WCT; Zürich, Switzerland; Carpet (i) – $300,000 – 32S/16D	(United States) Bill Scanlon; 7–5, 7–6, 1–6, 0–6, 6–4	(United States) Vitas Gerulaitis	(France) Pascal Portes (South Africa) Kevin Curren	(Argentina) Guillermo Vilas (Israel) Shlomo Glickstein (Italy) Corrado Barazzutti (Australia) John Fitzgerald
28 Mar	Zurich WCT; Zürich, Switzerland; Carpet (i) – $300,000 – 32S/16D	(United States) Sammy Giammalva (United States) Tom Gullikson; 6–4, 6–2	(Poland) Wojciech Fibak (Australia) John Fitzgerald	(France) Pascal Portes (South Africa) Kevin Curren	(Argentina) Guillermo Vilas (Israel) Shlomo Glickstein (Italy) Corrado Barazzutti (Australia) John Fitzgerald
12 Apr	Houston WCT; Houston, Texas, US; Clay – $300,000 – 32S/16D	(Czechoslovakia) Ivan Lendl; 3–6, 7–6, 6–0, 1–4, ret.	(Argentina) José Luis Clerc	(Ecuador) Andrés Gómez (Australia) Peter McNamara	(United States) Eddie Dibbs (United States) Eliot Teltscher (Bolivia) Mario Martínez (Paraguay) Víctor Pecci
12 Apr	Houston WCT; Houston, Texas, US; Clay – $300,000 – 32S/16D	(United States) Steve Denton (South Africa) Kevin Curren; 7–5, 6–4	(Australia) Mark Edmondson (Australia) Peter McNamara	(Ecuador) Andrés Gómez (Australia) Peter McNamara	(United States) Eddie Dibbs (United States) Eliot Teltscher (Bolivia) Mario Martínez (Paraguay) Víctor Pecci
20 April	Dallas WCT Finals; Dallas, Texas, US; Carpet (i) – $300,000 – 8S	(Czechoslovakia) Ivan Lendl; 6–2, 3–6, 6–3, 6–3	(United States) John McEnroe	(United States) Eddie Dibbs (India) Vijay Amritraj	(United States) Bill Scanlon (Czechoslovakia) Tomáš Šmíd (Argentina) José Luis Clerc (Poland) Wojciech Fibak

=== Summer / Fall circuit ===
Week	Tournament	Champion	Runner-up	Semifinalists	Quarterfinalists
27 Apr	Hilton Head WCT; Hilton Head, South Carolina, US; Clay – $300,000 – 32S/16D	(United States) Van Winitsky; 6–4, 6–4	(New Zealand) Chris Lewis	(Australia) Mark Edmondson (South Africa) Eddie Edwards	(Brazil) Carlos Kirmayr (Nigeria) Nduka Odizor (United States) Tom Cain (Ecuador) Andrés Gómez
27 Apr	Hilton Head WCT; Hilton Head, South Carolina, US; Clay – $300,000 – 32S/16D	(Australia) Mark Edmondson (Australia) Rod Frawley	(United States) Van Winitsky (United States) Alan Waldman	(Australia) Mark Edmondson (South Africa) Eddie Edwards	(Brazil) Carlos Kirmayr (Nigeria) Nduka Odizor (United States) Tom Cain (Ecuador) Andrés Gómez
2 May	WCT Tournament of Champions; Forest Hills, New York, US; Clay – $300,000 – 64S/32D	(Czechoslovakia) Ivan Lendl; 6–1, 6–1	(United States) Eddie Dibbs	(United States) John McEnroe (Argentina) José Luis Clerc	(United States) John Sadri (United States) Brian Teacher (Peru) Pablo Arraya (United States) Mel Purcell
2 May	WCT Tournament of Champions; Forest Hills, New York, US; Clay – $300,000 – 64S/32D	(United States) Johan Kriek (United States) Tracy Delatte; 6–4, 3–6, 6–3	(United States) Dick Stockton (United States) Erik van Dillen	(United States) John McEnroe (Argentina) José Luis Clerc	(United States) John Sadri (United States) Brian Teacher (Peru) Pablo Arraya (United States) Mel Purcell
12 Jul	Zell am See WCT; Zell am See, Austria; Clay – $300,000 – 32S/16D	(Argentina) José Luis Clerc; 6–0, 3–6, 6–2, 6–1	(Switzerland) Heinz Günthardt	(Spain) José Higueras (Czechoslovakia) Tomáš Šmíd	(United States) Bruce Manson (Poland) Wojciech Fibak (Czechoslovakia) Pavel Složil (Brazil) Cássio Motta
12 Jul	Zell am See WCT; Zell am See, Austria; Clay – $300,000 – 32S/16D	(United States) Bruce Manson (Poland) Wojciech Fibak; 6–7, 6–4, 6–4	(United States) Tony Giammalva (United States) Sammy Giammalva	(Spain) José Higueras (Czechoslovakia) Tomáš Šmíd	(United States) Bruce Manson (Poland) Wojciech Fibak (Czechoslovakia) Pavel Složil (Brazil) Cássio Motta
26 Jul	Cap d'Agde WCT; Cap d'Agde, France; Hard – $300,000 – 32S/16D	(Czechoslovakia) Tomáš Šmíd; 6–3, 6–4, 5–7, 6–2	(United States) Lloyd Bourne	(United States) Drew Gitlin (Brazil) Carlos Kirmayr	(Italy) Corrado Barazzutti (West Germany) Peter Elter (Czechoslovakia) Pavel Složil (Poland) Wojciech Fibak
26 Jul	Cap d'Agde WCT; Cap d'Agde, France; Hard – $300,000 – 32S/16D	(United States) Drew Gitlin (United States) Andy Andrews; 6–2, 6–4	(Czechoslovakia) Pavel Složil (Czechoslovakia) Tomáš Šmíd	(United States) Drew Gitlin (Brazil) Carlos Kirmayr	(Italy) Corrado Barazzutti (West Germany) Peter Elter (Czechoslovakia) Pavel Složil (Poland) Wojciech Fibak
10 Aug	La Costa WCT; La Costa, California, US; Hard – $300,000 – 16S/8D	(United States) Johan Kriek; 6–0, 4–6, 6–0, 6–4	(United States) Roscoe Tanner	(Hungary) Balázs Taróczy (United States) John Sadri	(Argentina) Guillermo Vilas (United States) Brian Teacher (Spain) José Higueras (Australia) Kim Warwick
10 Aug	La Costa WCT; La Costa, California, US; Hard – $300,000 – 16S/8D	(United States) Johan Kriek (United States) Fritz Buehning; 3–6, 7–6, 6–3	(United States) Robert Lutz (Mexico) Raúl Ramírez	(Hungary) Balázs Taróczy (United States) John Sadri	(Argentina) Guillermo Vilas (United States) Brian Teacher (Spain) José Higueras (Australia) Kim Warwick
20 Sep	Los Angeles WCT; Los Angeles, US; Carpet (i) – $300,000 – 32S/16D	(Czechoslovakia) Ivan Lendl; 7–6^{(7–5)}, 7–5, 6–1	(South Africa) Kevin Curren	(Poland) Wojciech Fibak (United States) Van Winitsky	(United States) Bill Scanlon (United States) Bruce Manson (United States) Terry Moor (United States) Butch Walts
20 Sep	Los Angeles WCT; Los Angeles, US; Carpet (i) – $300,000 – 32S/16D	(United States) Hank Pfister (South Africa) Kevin Curren; 4–6, 6–2, 7–5	(United States) Andy Andrews (United States) Drew Gitlin	(Poland) Wojciech Fibak (United States) Van Winitsky	(United States) Bill Scanlon (United States) Bruce Manson (United States) Terry Moor (United States) Butch Walts
14 Oct	Naples WCT Fall Finals; Naples, Italy; Carpet (i) – $250,000 – 8S; Singles	(Czechoslovakia) Ivan Lendl; 6–4, 6–2, 6–1	(Poland) Wojciech Fibak	(United States) Johan Kriek (Czechoslovakia) Tomáš Šmíd	(Switzerland) Heinz Günthardt (Spain) José Higueras (Argentina) José Luis Clerc (Argentina) Guillermo Vilas

=== Winter circuit ===
Week	Tournament	Champion	Runner-up	Semifinalists	Quarterfinalists
18 Oct	Amsterdam WCT; Amsterdam, Netherlands; Carpet (i) – $300,000 – 16S/8D	(Poland) Wojciech Fibak; 7–5, 3–6, 6–4, 6–3	(South Africa) Kevin Curren	(Czechoslovakia) Tomáš Šmíd (Hungary) Balázs Taróczy	(Switzerland) Heinz Günthardt (Brazil) Carlos Kirmayr (Spain) José Higueras (Uruguay) José Luis Damiani
18 Oct	Amsterdam WCT; Amsterdam, Netherlands; Carpet (i) – $300,000 – 16S/8D	(Czechoslovakia) Tomáš Šmíd (United States) Fritz Buehning; 4–6, 6–3, 6–0	(South Africa) Kevin Curren (United Kingdom) Buster Mottram	(Czechoslovakia) Tomáš Šmíd (Hungary) Balázs Taróczy	(Switzerland) Heinz Günthardt (Brazil) Carlos Kirmayr (Spain) José Higueras (Uruguay) José Luis Damiani
1 Nov	Baltimore WCT; Baltimore, Maryland, US; Carpet (i) – $300,000 – 16S/D18	(Australia) Paul McNamee; 4–6, 7–5, 7–5, 2–6, 6–3	(Argentina) Guillermo Vilas	(United States) Jimmy Arias (South Africa) Kevin Curren	(United States) Bill Scanlon (India) Vijay Amritraj (Bolivia) Mario Martínez (United States) John Sadri
1 Nov	Baltimore WCT; Baltimore, Maryland, US; Carpet (i) – $300,000 – 16S/D18	(United States) Tony Giammalva (India) Anand Amritraj; 7–5, 6–2	(India) Vijay Amritraj (Australia) Fred Stolle	(United States) Jimmy Arias (South Africa) Kevin Curren	(United States) Bill Scanlon (India) Vijay Amritraj (Bolivia) Mario Martínez (United States) John Sadri
15 Nov	Dortmund WCT; Dortmund, West Germany; Carpet (i) – $300,000 – 32S/16D	(United States) Brian Teacher; 6–7, 6–4, 6–4, 2–6, 6–4	(Poland) Wojciech Fibak	(United States) Tom Gullikson (Czechoslovakia) Tomáš Šmíd	(United States) Mark Dickson (South Africa) Freddie Sauer (United States) Chip Hooper (Paraguay) Francisco González
15 Nov	Dortmund WCT; Dortmund, West Germany; Carpet (i) – $300,000 – 32S/16D	(Czechoslovakia) Tomáš Šmíd (Czechoslovakia) Pavel Složil; 6–2, 6–7, 6–1	(United States) Mike Cahill (Paraguay) Francisco González	(United States) Tom Gullikson (Czechoslovakia) Tomáš Šmíd	(United States) Mark Dickson (South Africa) Freddie Sauer (United States) Chip Hooper (Paraguay) Francisco González
30 Nov	Chicago-2 WCT; Chicago, Illinois, US; Carpet – $300,000 – 16S/D18	(Poland) Wojciech Fibak; 6–2, 2–6, 6–3, 6–4	(United States) Bill Scanlon	(Argentina) Guillermo Vilas (United States) Tom Gullikson	(United States) Terry Moor (United States) Harold Solomon (Hungary) Balázs Taróczy (Argentina) José Luis Clerc
30 Nov	Chicago-2 WCT; Chicago, Illinois, US; Carpet – $300,000 – 16S/D18	(India) Vijay Amritraj (India) Anand Amritraj; 3–6, 6–2, 6–3	(United States) Mike Cahill (United States) Bruce Manson	(Argentina) Guillermo Vilas (United States) Tom Gullikson	(United States) Terry Moor (United States) Harold Solomon (Hungary) Balázs Taróczy (Argentina) José Luis Clerc
14 Dec	Hartford WCT; Hartford, Connecticut, US; Carpet (i)– $300,000 – 16S/8D	(Czechoslovakia) Ivan Lendl; 6–2, 6–4, 7–5	(United States) Bill Scanlon	(Hungary) Balázs Taróczy (United States) Robert Lutz	(Uruguay) José Luis Damiani (United States) Mark Dickson (Chile) Hans Gildemeister (United States) Jay Lapidus
14 Dec	Hartford WCT; Hartford, Connecticut, US; Carpet (i)– $300,000 – 16S/8D	(United States) Dick Stockton (United States) Robert Lutz; 7–6, 6–3	(United States) Mike Cahill (United States) Tracy Delatte	(Hungary) Balázs Taróczy (United States) Robert Lutz	(Uruguay) José Luis Damiani (United States) Mark Dickson (Chile) Hans Gildemeister (United States) Jay Lapidus
24 Jan 1983^{*}	Detroit WCT Winter Finals; Detroit, Michigan, US; Carpet (i) – $250,000 – 8S	(Czechoslovakia) Ivan Lendl; 7–5, 6–2, 2–6, 6–4	(Argentina) Guillermo Vilas	(South Africa) Kevin Curren (United States) Bill Scanlon	(Hungary) Balázs Taróczy (United States) Brian Teacher (Poland) Wojciech Fibak (Australia) Paul McNamee

^{*} The Detroit World Championship Tennis Winter Finals was played in January 1983 but was part of the 1982 WCT season.

== Prize money leaders ==
Prize money earned at WCT events during the calendar year 1982, excluding the Winter Finals played in Detroit in January 1983.

Rk	Name	Prize Money
1	(Czechoslovakia) Ivan Lendl	$1,349,000
2	(Poland) Wojciech Fibak	$487,780
3	(Argentina) José Luis Clerc	$454,750
4	(Czechoslovakia) Tomáš Šmíd	$440,370
5	(United States) Bill Scanlon	$276,600
6	(Hungary) Balázs Taróczy	$171,910
7	(India) Vijay Amritraj	$171,425
8	(South Africa) / (United States) Johan Kriek	$162,000
9	(South Africa) Kevin Curren	$160,610
10	(United States) John McEnroe	$153,750
11	(United States) Eddie Dibbs	$149,750
12	(Australia) Paul McNamee	$145,925
13	(Switzerland) Heinz Günthardt	$136,355
14	(United States) Brian Teacher	$116,750
15	(Australia) Peter McNamara	$105,820
16	(Argentina) Guillermo Vilas	$100,425
17	(United States) John Sadri	$97,500
18	(United States) Fritz Buehning	$83,160
19	(United States) Bruce Manson	$73,220
20	(United States) Vitas Gerulaitis	$72,925

== Standings ==
The 1982 WCT season was divided into three segments, the Spring Tour, the Summer/Fall Tour and the Winter Tour. These are the standings of the top twenty singles players on the WCT circuit for each of these segments.

1982 Spring Tour standings
#	Player	Points
1	(Czechoslovakia) Ivan Lendl	481
2	(Argentina) José Luis Clerc	320
3	(Poland) Wojciech Fibak	281
4	(India) Vijay Amritraj	235
5	(Czechoslovakia) Tomáš Šmíd	226
6	(Australia) Peter McNamara	215
7	(United States) John McEnroe	200
8	(United States) Vitas Gerulaitis	196
9	(Hungary) Balázs Taróczy	190
10	(United States) Eddie Dibbs	170
11	(United States) Bill Scanlon	151
12	(Paraguay) Víctor Pecci	141
13	(United States) Terry Moor	136
14	(United States) Eliot Teltscher	136
15	(United States) John Sadri	121
16	(Brazil) Carlos Kirmayr	120
17	(United States) Fritz Buehning	115
18	(South Africa) Johan Kriek	115
19	(Australia) John Fitzgerald	112
20	(Switzerland) Heinz Günthardt	108

1982 Summer/Fall Tour standings
#	Player	Points
1	(Czechoslovakia) Ivan Lendl	920
2	(Czechoslovakia) Tomáš Šmíd	780
3	(Argentina) José Luis Clerc	750
4	(Argentina) Guillermo Vilas	690
5	(United States) Johan Kriek	640
6	(Spain) José Higueras	500
7	(Switzerland) Heinz Günthardt	480
=	(Poland) Wojciech Fibak	480
9	(United States) Roscoe Tanner	440
10	(United States) Lloyd Bourne	420
11	(United States) Kevin Curren	390
12	(Paraguay) Víctor Pecci	310
13	(Hungary) Balázs Taróczy	290
14	(Brazil) Carlos Kirmayr	250
=	(Czechoslovakia) Pavel Složil	250
16	(United States) Drew Gitlin	240
17	(United States) John Sadri	220
=	(United States) Brian Teacher	220
=	(United States) Van Winitsky	220
20	(United States) Eliot Teltscher	210
=	(United States) Nick Saviano	210
=	(Australia) Kim Warwick	210

1982 Winter Tour standings
#	Player	Points
1	(Poland) Wojciech Fibak	1,420
2	(United States) Bill Scanlon	840
3	(United States) Kevin Curren	620
=	(Argentina) Guillermo Vilas	620
5	(Hungary) Balázs Taróczy	610
6	(Australia) Peter McNamara	570
7	(Czechoslovakia) Ivan Lendl	500
=	(United States) Brian Teacher	500
9	(United States) Tom Gullikson	400
=	(Czechoslovakia) Tomáš Šmíd	400
11	(Uruguay) Jose Luis Damiani	270
=	(United States) Mark Dickson	270
=	(United States) Robert Lutz	270
14	(Argentina) José Luis Clerc	240
=	(Switzerland) Heinz Günthardt	240
16	(India) Vijay Amritraj	210
=	(United States) Harold Solomon	210
18	(United States) Jimmy Arias	200
19	(Chile) Hans Gildemeister	170
20	(United States) Terry Moor	170

== See also ==
- 1982 Grand Prix circuit
