= 1972 World Championship Tennis Winter Finals – Singles =

Singles
- 1972 World Championship Tennis Winter Finals

Final
- Champion: (United States) Arthur Ashe
- Runner-up: (United States) Robert Lutz
- Score: 6–2, 3–6, 6–3, 3–6, 7–6

Events
| Singles | Doubles |
| World Championship Tennis Winter Finals | · 1982 → |

Arthur Ashe won in the final of the 1972 World Championship Tennis Winter Finals 6–2, 3–6, 6–3, 3–6, 7–6 against Robert Lutz.

== Seeds ==
A champion seed is indicated in bold text while text in italics indicates the round in which that seed was eliminated.

1. (United States) **Arthur Ashe (champion)**
2. (Australia) John Newcombe (quarterfinals)
3. (United Kingdom) Mark Cox (quarterfinals)
4. (Netherlands) Tom Okker (semifinals)
5. (United States) Marty Riessen (quarterfinals)
6. (South Africa) Cliff Drysdale (semifinals)
7. (United States) Robert Lutz (final)
8. (Socialist Federal Republic of Yugoslavia) Nikola Pilić (quarterfinals)

== Draw ==
=== Key ===
- Q = Qualifier
- WC = Wild card
- LL = Lucky loser
- Alt = Alternate
- SE = Special exempt
- PR = Protected ranking
- ITF = ITF entry
- JE = Junior exempt
- w/o = Walkover
- r = Retired
- d = Defaulted
- SR = Special ranking

Quarterfinals
1 | (United States) **Arthur Ashe** | **7** | **6**
8 | (Socialist Federal Republic of Yugoslavia) Nikola Pilić | 6 | 1
4 | (Netherlands) **Tom Okker** | **7** | **6**
5 | (United States) Marty Riessen | 6 | 4
6 | (South Africa) **Cliff Drysdale** | **6** | **6**
3 | (United Kingdom) Mark Cox | 4 | 3
7 | (United States) **Robert Lutz** | 6 | **7** | **6**
2 | (Australia) John Newcombe | **7** | 6 | 3

Semifinals
1 | (United States) **Arthur Ashe** | 6 | **6** | **6**
4 | (Netherlands) Tom Okker | **7** | 3 | 3
6 | (South Africa) Cliff Drysdale | 4 | 4
7 | (United States) **Robert Lutz** | **6** | **6**

Final
1 | (United States) **Arthur Ashe** | **6** | 3 | **6** | 3 | **7**
7 | (United States) Robert Lutz | 2 | **6** | 3 | **6** | 6
