= 1982 Munich Cup =

- Date: 8–14 March
- Edition: 4th
- Category: World Championship Tennis (WCT)
- Draw: 32S / 16D
- Prize money: $300,000
- Surface: Carpet / Indoor
- Location: Munich, West Germany

Champions

Singles
- (Czechoslovakia) Ivan Lendl

Doubles
- (Australia) Mark Edmondson / (Czechoslovakia) Tomáš Šmíd
- Munich WCT

The 1982 Munich Cup, also known as Munich WCT, was a men's tennis tournament played on indoor carpet courts in Munich, West Germany. The tournament was part of the 1982 World Championship Tennis circuit. It was the fourth edition of the event and was held from 8 March through 14 March 1982. First-seeded Ivan Lendl won the singles title.

== Finals ==
=== Singles ===
(Czechoslovakia) Ivan Lendl defeated (Czechoslovakia) Tomáš Šmíd 3–6, 6–3, 6–1, 6–2

- It was Lendl's 3rd singles title of the year and the 20th of his career.

=== Doubles ===
(Australia) Mark Edmondson / (Czechoslovakia) Tomáš Šmíd defeated (South Africa) Kevin Curren / (United States) Steve Denton 4–6, 7–5, 6–2
