= 1982 Richmond WCT Classic =

- Date: February 8–14
- Edition: 17th
- Category: WCT
- Draw: 32S / 16D
- Prize money: $300,000
- Surface: Carpet / indoor
- Location: Richmond, Virginia, United States
- Venue: Richmond Coliseum
- Attendance: 23,700

Champions

Singles
- (Argentina) José Luis Clerc

Doubles
- (Australia) Kim Warwick / (Australia) Mark Edmondson
← 1981 ·	Richmond WCT	· 1983 →

The 1982 Richmond WCT Classic was a men's tennis tournament played on indoor carpet courts at the Richmond Coliseum in Richmond, Virginia, United States. The event was part of 1982 World Championship Tennis circuit. It was the 17th edition of the tournament and was held from February 8 through February 14, 1982. First-seeded José Luis Clerc won the singles title and earned $100,000 first-prize money.

== Finals ==
=== Singles ===
(Argentina) José Luis Clerc defeated (United States) Fritz Buehning 3–6, 6–3, 6–4, 6–3

- It was Clerc' 1st singles title of the year and the 17th of his career.

=== Doubles ===
(Australia) Kim Warwick / (Australia) Mark Edmondson defeated (Australia) Syd Ball / (West Germany) Rolf Gehring 6–4, 6–2
