= 1982 Baltimore International =

- Date: November 1–7
- Edition: 10th
- Category: WCT
- Draw: 16S / 8D
- Prize money: $300,000
- Surface: Carpet / indoor
- Location: Baltimore, MD, U.S.
- Venue: Towson State College

Champions

Singles
- (Australia) Paul McNamee

Doubles
- (India) Anand Amritraj / (United States) Tony Giammalva
- Baltimore International

The 1982 Baltimore International, also known by its sponsored name First National Classic, was a men's tennis tournament played on indoor carpet courts at the Towson State College in Baltimore, Maryland in the United States that was part of the 1982 World Championship Tennis circuit. It was the tenth, and last, edition of the event and was held from November 1 through November 7, 1982. Second-seeded Paul McNamee won the singles title.

== Finals ==
=== Singles ===
(Australia) Paul McNamee defeated (Argentina) Guillermo Vilas 4–6, 7–5, 7–5, 2–6, 6–3

- It was McNamee's 1st singles title of the year and the 2nd of his career.

=== Doubles ===
(India) Anand Amritraj / (United States) Tony Giammalva defeated (India) Vijay Amritraj / (Australia) Fred Stolle 7–5, 6–2
