= 1982 Mexico City WCT =

- Date: 19–24 January
- Edition: 4th
- Category: World Championship Tennis
- Draw: 16S / 8D
- Prize money: $300,000
- Surface: Carpet (indoors)
- Location: Mexico City, Mexico

Champions

Singles
- (Czechoslovakia) Tomáš Šmíd

Doubles
- (United States) Ferdi Taygan / (United States) Sherwood Stewart
- Mexico City WCT

The 1982 Mexico City WCT was a men's tennis tournament played on indoor carpet courts in Mexico City, Mexico. The event was part of the 1982 World Championship Tennis circuit. It was the fourth and last edition of the tournament and was held from 19 January until 24 January 1982. Unseeded Tomáš Šmíd won the singles title.

== Finals ==
=== Singles ===
(Czechoslovakia) Tomáš Šmíd defeated (United States) John Sadri, 3–6, 7–6, 4–6, 7–6, 6–2

- It was Šmíd's 1st singles title of the year and the 5th of his career.

=== Doubles ===
(United States) Ferdi Taygan / (United States) Sherwood Stewart defeated (Czechoslovakia) Tomáš Šmíd / (Hungary) Balázs Taróczy, 6–4, 7–5

== See also ==
- 1982 Monterrey Cup
