= 1972 World Championship Tennis Winter Finals =

- Date: 22–26 November
- Edition: 1st
- Category: World Championship Tennis
- Draw: 8S
- Surface: Carpet / indoor
- Location: Rome, Italy
- Venue: Palazzo dello Sport

Champions

Singles
- (United States) Arthur Ashe
World Championship Tennis Winter Finals	· 1982 →

The 1972 World Championship Tennis Winter Finals was a tennis tournament played on indoor carpet court. It was the inaugural edition of the WCT Winter Finals and was part of the 1972 World Championship Tennis circuit. It was played at the Palazzo dello Sport in the EUR district of Rome in Italy from 22 November until 26 November 1972.

== Finals ==
=== Singles ===
(United States) Arthur Ashe defeated (United States) Robert Lutz 6–2, 3–6, 6–3, 3–6, 7–6

- It was Ashe's 5th title of the year and the 15th of his professional career.

== See also ==
- 1972 World Championship Tennis Finals
