= 1982 World Championship Tennis Fall Finals =

- Date: October 14–17
- Edition: 1st
- Category: WCT Tour
- Draw: 8S
- Surface: Carpet / indoor
- Location: Naples, Italy

Champions

Singles
- (Czechoslovakia) Ivan Lendl
- World Championship Tennis Fall Finals

The 1982 World Championship Tennis Fall Finals was a men's tennis tournament played on indoor carpet courts. It was the only edition of the World Championship Tennis Fall Finals and was part of the 1982 World Championship Tennis circuit. It was played in Naples in Italy and was held from October 14 through October 17, 1982. First-seeded Ivan Lendl won the title.

== Final ==
=== Singles ===
(Czechoslovakia) Ivan Lendl defeated (Poland) Wojciech Fibak 6–4, 6–2, 6–1

- It was Lendl's 14th singles title of the year and the 30th of his career.
