= 1980 Torneo Godó =

- Date: 6–12 October
- Edition: 28th
- Category: Grand Prix circuit
- Draw: 64S / 32D
- Prize money: $175,000
- Surface: Clay / outdoor
- Location: Barcelona, Catalonia, Spain
- Venue: Real Club de Tenis Barcelona

Champions

Singles
- (Czechoslovakia) Ivan Lendl

Doubles
- (United States) Steve Denton / (Czechoslovakia) Ivan Lendl
- Torneo Godó

The 1980 Torneo Godó or Trofeo Conde de Godó was a men's tennis tournament that took place on outdoor clay courts at the Real Club de Tenis Barcelona in Barcelona, Catalonia, Spain. It was the 28th edition of the tournament and was part of the 1980 Grand Prix circuit. It was held from 6 October through 12 October 1980. Second-seeded Ivan Lendl won the singles title. Björn Borg, winner in 1975 and 1977, withdrew two days before the start of the event due to a knee injury.

This event also carried the joint denominations of the Campeonatos Internacionales de España or Spanish International Championships that was hosted at this venue and location, and was 13th edition to be held in Barcelona, and the 3rd edition of the Open Marlborough (for sponsorship reasons).

== Finals ==
=== Singles ===
(Czechoslovakia) Ivan Lendl defeated (Argentina) Guillermo Vilas 6–4, 5–7, 6–4, 4–6, 6–1

- It was Lendl's 3rd singles title of the year and of his career.

=== Doubles ===
(United States) Steve Denton / (Czechoslovakia) Ivan Lendl defeated (Czechoslovakia) Pavel Složil / (Hungary) Balázs Taróczy 6–2, 6–7, 6–3
