= 1982 World Championship Tennis Winter Finals =

- Date: January 24–31, 1983
- Edition: 2nd
- Category: World Championship Tennis
- Surface: Carpet / indoor
- Location: Detroit, Michigan, US
- Venue: Cobo Arena

Champions

Singles
- (Czechoslovakia) Ivan Lendl
← 1972 ·	World Championship Tennis Winter Finals

The 1982 World Championship Tennis Winter Finals was a men's tennis tournament played on indoor carpet courts. It was the 2nd edition of the World Championship Tennis Winter Finals and was part of the 1982 World Championship Tennis circuit. It was played in the Cobo Arena in Detroit, Michigan in the United States from January 24 to January 31, 1983.

== Final ==
=== Singles ===
(Czechoslovakia) Ivan Lendl defeated (Argentina) Guillermo Vilas 7–5, 6–2, 2–6, 6–4

- It was Lendl's 1st title of the year and the 35th of his career.
