= 1982 World Championship Tennis Fall Finals – Singles =

Singles
- 1982 World Championship Tennis Fall Finals

Final
- Champion: (Czechoslovakia) Ivan Lendl
- Runner-up: (Poland) Wojciech Fibak
- Score: 6–4, 6–2, 6–1

Details
- Draw: 8
- Seeds: 2

Events
Singles	Doubles
- World Championship Tennis Fall Finals

First-seeded Ivan Lendl won in the final 6–4, 6–2, 6–1 of the 1982 World Championship Tennis Fall Finals against Wojciech Fibak.

== Seeds ==
A champion seed is indicated in bold text while text in italics indicates the round in which that seed was eliminated.

1. (Czechoslovakia) **Ivan Lendl (champion)**
2. (Argentina) Guillermo Vilas (quarterfinals)

== Draw ==
Key

- Q = Qualifier
- WC = Wild card
- LL = Lucky loser
- Alt = Alternate
- ITF = ITF entry
- PR = Protected ranking
- SR = Special ranking
- SE = Special exempt
- JE = Junior exempt
- JR = Junior Accelerator Programme entrant
- CO = College Accelerator Programme entrant
- NG = Next Gen Accelerator Program entrant
- w/o = Walkover
- r = Retired
- d = Defaulted

Quarterfinals
1	(Czechoslovakia) **Ivan Lendl**	**6**	**6**	**6**
(Switzerland) Heinz Günthardt	4	2	2
(South Africa) **Johan Kriek**	**6**	1
(Spain) José Higueras	3	4^{r}
(Argentina) José Luis Clerc	3	2	4
(Czechoslovakia) **Tomáš Šmíd**	**6**	**6**	**6**
(Poland) **Wojciech Fibak**	**6**	**6**	**7**
2	(Argentina) Guillermo Vilas	3	3	6

Semifinals
1	(Czechoslovakia) **Ivan Lendl**	**6**	**6**	**7**
(South Africa) Johan Kriek	4	4	5
(Czechoslovakia) Tomáš Šmíd	1	3	**7**	1
(Poland) **Wojciech Fibak**	**6**	**6**	5	**6**

Final
1	(Czechoslovakia) **Ivan Lendl**	**6**	**6**	**6**
(Poland) Wojciech Fibak	4	2	1
