= 1982 World Championship Tennis Winter Finals – Singles =

Singles
- 1982 World Championship Tennis Winter Finals

Final
- Champion: (Czechoslovakia) Ivan Lendl
- Runner-up: (Argentina) Guillermo Vilas
- Score: 7–5, 6–2, 2–6, 6–4

Details
- Draw: 8

Events
Singles	Doubles
- World Championship Tennis Winter Finals

Ivan Lendl won in the final 7–5, 6–2, 2–6, 6–4 against Guillermo Vilas.

== Seeds ==
A champion seed is indicated in bold text while text in italics indicates the round in which that seed was eliminated.

1. (Czechoslovakia) **Ivan Lendl (champion)**
2. (Argentina) Guillermo Vilas (final)

== Draw ==
Key

- Q = Qualifier
- WC = Wild card
- LL = Lucky loser
- Alt = Alternate
- ITF = ITF entry
- PR = Protected ranking
- SR = Special ranking
- SE = Special exempt
- JE = Junior exempt
- JR = Junior Accelerator Programme entrant
- CO = College Accelerator Programme entrant
- NG = Next Gen Accelerator Program entrant
- w/o = Walkover
- r = Retired
- d = Defaulted

Quarterfinals
1	(Czechoslovakia) **Ivan Lendl**	**6**	**6**	**6**
(Hungary) Balázs Taróczy	2	2	2
(United States) Brian Teacher	2	3	**7**	6
(South Africa) **Kevin Curren**	**6**	**6**	6	**7**
(Poland) Wojciech Fibak	5	3	6
(United States) **Bill Scanlon**	**7**	**6**	**7**
(Australia) Paul McNamee	1	4	1
2	(Argentina) **Guillermo Vilas**	**6**	**6**	**6**

Semifinals
1	(Czechoslovakia) **Ivan Lendl**	**7**	**6**	3	**6**
(South Africa) Kevin Curren	5	4	**6**	1
(United States) Bill Scanlon	3	6	4
2	(Argentina) **Guillermo Vilas**	**6**	**7**	**6**

Final
1	(Czechoslovakia) **Ivan Lendl**	**7**	**6**	2	**6**
2	(Argentina) Guillermo Vilas	5	2	**6**	4
