= WCT Gold Coast Cup =

Defunct tennis tournament
- Tour: WCT Tour
- Founded: 1982
- Abolished: 1983
- Editions: 2
- Location: Delray Beach, USA
- Surface: Clay / outdoor

The WCT Gold Coast Cup was a men's tennis tournament played in Delray Beach, Florida in the United States from 1982 to 1983. The event was part of the WCT Tour and was held on outdoor clay courts. This tournament was succeeded by the International Players Championships in 1985.

== Finals ==
=== Singles ===
Year	Champions	Runners-up	Score
1982	(Czech Republic) Ivan Lendl	(Australia) Peter McNamara	6–4, 4–6, 6–4, 7–5
1983	(Argentina) Guillermo Vilas	(Czech Republic) Pavel Složil	6–1, 6–4, 6–0

=== Doubles ===
Year	Champions	Runners-up	Score
1982	(United States) Mel Purcell (United States) Eliot Teltscher	(Czech Republic) Tomáš Šmíd (Hungary) Balázs Taróczy	6–4, 7–6
1983	(Czech Republic) Pavel Složil (Czech Republic) Tomáš Šmíd	(India) Anand Amritraj (United States) Johan Kriek	7–6, 6–4
