= 1993 Paris Open – Singles =

Singles
- 1993 Paris Open

Final
- Champion: (Croatia) Goran Ivanišević
- Runner-up: (Ukraine) Andriy Medvedev
- Score: 6–4, 6–2, 7–6^{(7–2)}

Details
- Draw: 48 (4WC/6Q)
- Seeds: 16

Events
Singles	Doubles
← 1992 ·	Paris Masters	· 1994 →

Goran Ivanišević defeated Andriy Medvedev in the final, 6–4, 6–2, 7–6^{(7–2)} to win the singles tennis title at the 1993 Paris Open.

Boris Becker was the defending champion, but lost in the quarterfinals to Arnaud Boetsch.

== Seeds ==
A champion seed is indicated in bold text while text in italics indicates the round in which that seed was eliminated.

1. (United States) Pete Sampras (quarterfinals)
2. (United States) Jim Courier (second round)
3. (Germany) Boris Becker (quarterfinals)
4. (Germany) Michael Stich (quarterfinals)
5. (Spain) Sergi Bruguera (second round)
6. (Sweden) Stefan Edberg (semifinals)
7. (United States) Michael Chang (third round)
8. (Ukraine) Andriy Medvedev (final)
9. (Croatia) **Goran Ivanišević (champion)**
10. (France) Cédric Pioline (second round)
11. (Netherlands) Richard Krajicek (second round)
12. (Czech Republic) Petr Korda (third round)
13. (United States) Todd Martin (third round)
14. (Czech Republic) Karel Nováček (third round)
15. (Russia) Alexander Volkov (second round)
16. (Australia) Wally Masur (second round)

== Draw ==
=== Key ===
- Q = Qualifier
- WC = Wild card
- LL = Lucky loser
- Alt = Alternate
- SE = Special exempt
- PR = Protected ranking
- ITF = ITF entry
- JE = Junior exempt
- w/o = Walkover
- r = Retired
- d = Defaulted
- SR = Special ranking
- NB: The Final was the best of 5 sets.

=== Finals ===
Quarterfinals
1	(United States) Pete Sampras	6^{3}	5
9	**(Croatia) Goran Ivanišević**	**7^{7}**	**7**
4	(Germany) Michael Stich	2	**7**	2
6	**(Sweden) Stefan Edberg**	**6**	5	**6**
**(France) Arnaud Boetsch**	3	**6**	**7^{7}**
4	(Germany) Boris Becker	**6**	3	6^{4}
8	**(Ukraine) Andriy Medvedev**	4	**7**	**6**
(Australia) Mark Woodforde	**6**	5	4

Semifinals
9	(Croatia) **Goran Ivanišević**	4	**7^{7}**	**7^{7}**
6	(Sweden) Stefan Edberg	**6**	6^{4}	6^{3}
(France) Arnaud Boetsch	**6**	6^{3}	5
8	(Ukraine) **Andriy Medvedev**	2	**7^{7}**	**7**

Final
9	(Croatia) **Goran Ivanišević**	**6**	**6**	**7^{7}**
8	(Ukraine) Andriy Medvedev	4	2	6^{2}

=== Top half ===
==== Section 1 ====
First round
Q	(United States) **D Wheaton**	**6**	**7**
(United States) I Lendl	3	5
(United States) B Gilbert	3	3
(Switzerland) **M Rosset**	**6**	**6**
(Sweden) **J Svensson**	**7^{7}**	**6**
(Germany) M-K Goellner	6^{1}	4
(United States) **M Washington**	**7**	**6**
(New Zealand) B Steven	5	3

Second round
1	(United States) **P Sampras**	**6**	**6**
Q	(United States) D Wheaton	4	2
(Switzerland) **M Rosset**	6^{6}	**6**	**6**
15	(Russia) A Volkov	**7^{8}**	3	4
9	(Croatia) **G Ivanišević**	3	**6**	**7^{7}**
(Sweden) J Svensson	**6**	3	6^{3}
(United States) M Washington	**7^{7}**	2	3
7	(United States) **M Chang**	6^{1}	**6**	**6**

Third round
1	(United States) **P Sampras**	**7**	**6**
(Switzerland) M Rosset	5	3
9	(Croatia) **G Ivanišević**	**7^{7}**	**7**
7	(United States) M Chang	6^{5}	5

Quarterfinals
1	(United States) P Sampras	6^{3}	5
9	(Croatia) **G Ivanišević**	**7^{7}**	**7**

==== Section 2 ====
First round
(Sweden) **M Larsson**	**7^{7}**	4	**6**
(Spain) C Costa	6^{4}	**6**	2
Q	(France) L Roux	2	0
WC	(France) **G Raoux**	**6**	**6**
(Switzerland) J Hlasek	6^{4}	3
(Russia) **A Chesnokov**	**7^{7}**	**6**
WC	(France) **O Delaître**	**6**	**6**
(United States) R Reneberg	4	4

Second round
4	(Germany) **M Stich**	**7^{7}**	**6**
(Sweden) M Larsson	6^{4}	2
WC	(France) G Raoux	3	2
13	(United States) **T Martin**	**6**	**6**
12	(Czech Republic) **P Korda**	**6**	6^{3}	**7^{7}**
(Russia) A Chesnokov	3	**7^{7}**	6^{2}
WC	(France) O Delaître	2	3
6	(Sweden) **S Edberg**	**6**	**6**

Third round
4	(Germany) **M Stich**	**7^{7}**	**6**
13	(United States) T Martin	6^{3}	1
12	(Czech Republic) P Korda	**6**	4	5
6	(Sweden) **S Edberg**	4	**6**	**7**

Quarterfinals
4	(Germany) M Stich	2	**7**	2
6	(Sweden) **S Edberg**	**6**	5	**6**

=== Bottom half ===
==== Section 3 ====
First round
(Spain) J Sánchez	4	0
(France) **A Boetsch**	**6**	**6**
Q	(United States) **J Palmer**	**6**	**6**
(Australia) J Stoltenberg	3	2
(Sweden) H Holm	3	3
(Russia) **A Cherkasov**	**6**	**6**
Q	(Russia) **A Olhovskiy**	**7^{9}**	6^{3}	**6**
WC	(France) R Gilbert	6^{7}	**7^{7}**	0

Second round
5	(Spain) S Bruguera	4	4
(France) **A Boetsch**	**6**	**6**
Q	(United States) **J Palmer**	**7**	**7^{7}**
11	(Netherlands) R Krajicek	5	6^{3}
14	(Czech Republic) **K Nováček**	**7^{7}**	**7^{7}**
(Russia) A Cherkasov	6^{2}	6^{5}
Q	(Russia) A Olhovskiy	**7^{8}**	2	6^{5}
3	(Germany) **B Becker**	6^{6}	**6**	**7^{7}**

Third round
(France) **A Boetsch**	6^{5}	**6**	**6**
Q	(United States) J Palmer	**7^{7}**	3	4
14	(Czech Republic) K Nováček	6^{9}	2
3	(Germany) **B Becker**	**7^{11}**	**6**

Quarterfinals
(France) **A Boetsch**	3	**6**	**7^{7}**
3	(Germany) B Becker	**6**	3	6^{4}

==== Section 4 ====
First round
(Israel) **A Mansdorf**	4	**6**	**6**
(South Africa) M Ondruska	**6**	4	1
Q	(France) T Champion	**7^{9}**	5	1
WC	(France) **H Leconte**	6^{7}	**7**	**6**
(Australia) **M Woodforde**	**7^{7}**	**6**
Q	(Zimbabwe) B Black	6^{2}	2
(South Africa) W Ferreira	6^{1}	1
(Sweden) **M Gustafsson**	**7^{7}**	**6**

Second round
8	(Ukraine) **A Medvedev**	6^{2}	**6**	**7^{7}**
(Israel) A Mansdorf	**7^{7}**	3	6^{4}
WC	(France) **H Leconte**	2	**6**	**6**
10	(France) C Pioline	**6**	4	3
16	(Australia) W Masur	4	**6**	3
(Australia) **M Woodforde**	**6**	1	**6**
(Sweden) **M Gustafsson**	**6**	**6**
2	(United States) J Courier	4	3

Third round
8	(Ukraine) **A Medvedev**	**7**	6^{3}	**6**
WC	(France) H Leconte	5	**7^{7}**	3
(Australia) **M Woodforde**	**6**	4	**6**
(Sweden) M Gustafsson	3	**6**	3

Quarterfinals
8	(Ukraine) **A Medvedev**	4	**7**	**6**
(Australia) M Woodforde	**6**	5	4

== Qualifying ==
=== Qualifying seeds ===
1. (United States) **David Wheaton (qualified)**
2. (United States) Aaron Krickstein (second round)
3. (Sweden) Nicklas Kulti (first round)
4. (United States) Patrick McEnroe (qualifying competition)
5. (Russia) **Andrei Olhovskiy (qualified)**
6. (Zimbabwe) **Byron Black (qualified)**
7. (United States) Jeff Tarango (qualifying competition)
8. (Russia) Yevgeny Kafelnikov (second round)
9. (Italy) Diego Nargiso (second round, retired)
10. (United States) **Jared Palmer (qualified)**
11. (Venezuela) Nicolás Pereira (second round)
12. (Belgium) Xavier Daufresne (first round)

=== Qualifiers ===
1. (United States) **David Wheaton**
2. (France) **Thierry Champion**
3. (France) **Lionel Roux**
4. (United States) **Jared Palmer**
5. (Russia) **Andrei Olhovskiy**
6. (Zimbabwe) **Byron Black**

=== Qualifying draw ===
==== First qualifier ====
First round
1	**(United States) David Wheaton**	**6**	**6**
(France) Guillaume Marx	3	2
(Belgium) Christophe Van Garsse	**6**	5	4
**(Belgium) Johan Van Herck**	4	**7**	**6**
(Romania) Dinu Pescariu	1	**6**	2
**(Canada) Daniel Nestor**	**6**	3	**6**
(United States) Jonathan Canter	**6**	3	4
11	**(Venezuela) Nicolás Pereira**	4	**6**	**6**

Second round
1	**(United States) David Wheaton**	**6**	**6**
(Belgium) Johan Van Herck	4	1
**(Canada) Daniel Nestor**	**7**	**7**
11	(Venezuela) Nicolás Pereira	6	6

Qualifying competition
1	**(United States) David Wheaton**	**7**	5	**6**
(Canada) Daniel Nestor	5	**7**	3

==== Second qualifier ====
First round
2	**(United States) Aaron Krickstein**	**6**	**6**
(Germany) Patrick Baur	1	2
(Slovakia) Karol Kučera	2	3
**(France) Thierry Champion**	**6**	**6**
**(Hungary) Sándor Noszály**	6	**6**	**6**
(France) Stéphane Sansoni	**7**	2	4
**(The Bahamas) Mark Knowles**	6	**6**	**6**
12	(Belgium) Xavier Daufresne	**7**	2	2

Second round
2	(United States) Aaron Krickstein	4	3
**(France) Thierry Champion**	**6**	**6**
(Hungary) Sándor Noszály	2	4
**(The Bahamas) Mark Knowles**	**6**	**6**

Qualifying competition
**(France) Thierry Champion**	4	**6**	**6**
(The Bahamas) Mark Knowles	**6**	1	4

==== Third qualifier ====
First round
3	(Sweden) Nicklas Kulti	3	5
WC	**(France) Philippe Pech**	**6**	**7**
WC	(France) Pierre Bouteyre	3	**7**	2
WC	**(France) Stéphane Andriolo**	**6**	5	**6**
(Spain) Marcos Górriz	2	4
**(France) Lionel Roux**	**6**	**6**
(Sweden) David Engel	6	2
9	**(Italy) Diego Nargiso**	**7**	**6**

Second round
WC	**(France) Philippe Pech**	**6**	4	**6**
WC	(France) Stéphane Andriolo	0	**6**	4
**(France) Lionel Roux**	**7**	1
9	(Italy) Diego Nargiso	6	0^{r}

Qualifying competition
(France) Philippe Pech	6	3
**(France) Lionel Roux**	**7**	**6**

==== Fourth qualifier ====
First round
4	**(United States) Patrick McEnroe**	**6**	6	**6**
(Sweden) Ulf Stenlund	4	**7**	3
(Spain) Juan Gisbert Schultze	5	**6**	3
**(Netherlands) Tom Nijssen**	**7**	4	**6**
**(United States) Alex Reichel**	5	**7**	**6**
(India) Leander Paes	**7**	6	1
WC	(France) Gilles Bastié	1	1
10	**(United States) Jared Palmer**	**6**	**6**

Second round
4	**(United States) Patrick McEnroe**	**6**	**6**
(Netherlands) Tom Nijssen	3	4
(United States) Alex Reichel	5	4
10	**(United States) Jared Palmer**	**7**	**6**

Qualifying competition
4	(United States) Patrick McEnroe	3	**6**	1
10	**(United States) Jared Palmer**	**6**	3	**6**

==== Fifth qualifier ====
First round
5	**(Russia) Andrei Olhovskiy**	**7**	**6**
(France) Gérard Solvès	6	4
(South Africa) David Nainkin	3	3
**(Australia) John Fitzgerald**	**6**	**6**
**(South Africa) David Adams**	**6**	**6**
(Israel) Eyal Ran	3	2
(United States) Richard Matuszewski	4	4
8	**(Russia) Yevgeny Kafelnikov**	**6**	**6**

Second round
5	**(Russia) Andrei Olhovskiy**	**6**	**6**
(Australia) John Fitzgerald	4	1
**(South Africa) David Adams**	**6**	**6**
8	(Russia) Yevgeny Kafelnikov	3	2

Qualifying competition
5	**(Russia) Andrei Olhovskiy**	6	**6**	**6**
(South Africa) David Adams	**7**	4	1

==== Sixth qualifier ====
First round
6	**(Zimbabwe) Byron Black**	**6**	**6**
(United States) Keith Evans	4	2
WC	**(France) Sébastien Hette**	3	**7**	**7**
(Austria) Thomas Gollwitzer	**6**	6	5
(France) Lionel Barthez	**7**	5	3
**(Germany) Michael Geserer**	6	**7**	**6**
(France) Stéphane Huet	4	5
7	**(United States) Jeff Tarango**	**6**	**7**

Second round
6	**(Zimbabwe) Byron Black**	**6**	**6**
WC	(France) Sébastien Hette	2	0
(Germany) Michael Geserer	5	6
7	**(United States) Jeff Tarango**	**7**	**7**

Qualifying competition
6	**(Zimbabwe) Byron Black**	**6**	**6**
7	(United States) Jeff Tarango	1	2
