= 1994 Paris Open – Doubles =

Doubles
- 1994 Paris Open

Final
- Champions: (Netherlands) Jacco Eltingh; (Netherlands) Paul Haarhuis
- Runners-up: (Zimbabwe) Byron Black; (United States) Jonathan Stark
- Score: 3–6, 7–6, 7–5

Details
- Draw: 24
- Seeds: 8

Events
Singles	Doubles
← 1993 ·	Paris Open	· 1995 →

Byron Black and Jonathan Stark were the defending champions, but lost in the final this year.

Jacco Eltingh and Paul Haarhuis won in the final 3–6, 7–6, 7–5, against Black and Stark.

== Seeds ==
All seeds receive a bye into the second round.

1. (Netherlands) Jacco Eltingh / (Netherlands) Paul Haarhuis (champions)
2. (Zimbabwe) Byron Black / (United States) Jonathan Stark (final)
3. (Canada) Grant Connell / (United States) Patrick Galbraith (semifinals)
4. (Australia) Todd Woodbridge / (Australia) Mark Woodforde (semifinals)
5. (South Africa) David Adams / (Russia) Andrei Olhovskiy (quarterfinals)
6. (United States) Patrick McEnroe / (United States) Jared Palmer (quarterfinals)
7. (Netherlands) Tom Nijssen / (Czech Republic) Cyril Suk (second round)
8. (United States) Alex O'Brien / (Australia) Sandon Stolle (quarterfinals)

== Draw ==
=== Key ===
- Q = Qualifier
- WC = Wild card
- LL = Lucky loser
- Alt = Alternate
- SE = Special exempt
- PR = Protected ranking
- ITF = ITF entry
- JE = Junior exempt
- w/o = Walkover
- r = Retired
- d = Defaulted
- SR = Special ranking

=== Finals ===
Semifinals

Final

1
- (Netherlands) Jacco Eltingh
- (Netherlands) Paul Haarhuis
6
6

4
- (Australia) Todd Woodbridge
- (Australia) Mark Woodforde
3
4

1
- (Netherlands) Jacco Eltingh
- (Netherlands) Paul Haarhuis
3
7
7

2
- (Zimbabwe) Byron Black
- (United States) Jonathan Stark
6
6
5

3
- (Canada) Grant Connell
- (United States) Patrick Galbraith
7
3
2

2
- (Zimbabwe) Byron Black
- (United States) Jonathan Stark
6
6
6

=== Top half ===
First round

Second round

Quarterfinals

Semifinals

1
- (Netherlands) J Eltingh
- (Netherlands) P Haarhuis
7
7

- (The Bahamas) M Knowles
- (United States) R Reneberg
7
6

- (The Bahamas) M Knowles
- (United States) R Reneberg
5
5

- (Australia) M Kratzmann
- (Spain) J Sánchez
6
3

1
- (Netherlands) J Eltingh
- (Netherlands) P Haarhuis
6
6
6

- (Italy) D Nargiso
- (South Africa) D Visser
6
6
4

- (Netherlands) M Oosting
- (Czech Republic) D Vacek
3
7
4

- (Netherlands) M Oosting
- (Czech Republic) D Vacek
3
7
6

- (Netherlands) M Oosting
- (Czech Republic) D Vacek
7
6

7
- (Netherlands) T Nijssen
- (Czech Republic) C Suk
6
1

1
- (Netherlands) J Eltingh
- (Netherlands) P Haarhuis
6
6

4
- (Australia) T Woodbridge
- (Australia) M Woodforde
3
4

4
- (Australia) T Woodbridge
- (Australia) M Woodforde
6
6

- (United States) J Grabb
- (United States) S Melville
3
6

- (South Africa) G Muller
- (South Africa) P Norval
4
4

- (South Africa) G Muller
- (South Africa) P Norval
6
7

4
- (Australia) T Woodbridge
- (Australia) M Woodforde
6
6

WC
- (France) O Delaître
- (Sweden) S Edberg
6
7

6
- (United States) P McEnroe
- (United States) J Palmer
2
3

- (South Africa) J-L de Jager
- (Australia) J Fitzgerald
4
6

WC
- (France) O Delaître
- (Sweden) S Edberg
6
5
3

6
- (United States) P McEnroe
- (United States) J Palmer
3
7
6

=== Bottom half ===
First round

Second round

Quarterfinals

Semifinals

5
- (South Africa) D Adams
- (Russia) A Olhovskiy
6
6
6

WC
- (France) C Pioline
- (Switzerland) M Rosset
6
2

WC
- (Spain) S Bruguera
- (United States) J Courier
7
4
4

WC
- (Spain) S Bruguera
- (United States) J Courier
7
6

5
- (South Africa) D Adams
- (Russia) A Olhovskiy
4
4

- (Sweden) N Kulti
- (Sweden) M Larsson
6
4
7

3
- (Canada) G Connell
- (United States) P Galbraith
6
6

- (United States) M Bauer
- (United States) S Davis
3
6
6

- (Sweden) N Kulti
- (Sweden) M Larsson
3
6

3
- (Canada) G Connell
- (United States) P Galbraith
6
7

3
- (Canada) G Connell
- (United States) P Galbraith
7
3
2

2
- (Zimbabwe) B Black
- (United States) J Stark
6
6
6

8
- (United States) A O'Brien
- (Australia) S Stolle
6
6

- (Netherlands) H Jan Davids
- (Russia) Y Kafelnikov
4
4

WC
- (Germany) B Becker
- (United States) L Jensen
4
3

WC
- (Germany) B Becker
- (United States) L Jensen
6
6

8
- (United States) A O'Brien
- (Australia) S Stolle
6
6
3

- (United States) F Montana
- (United States) J Pugh
6
6

2
- (Zimbabwe) B Black
- (United States) J Stark
7
2
6

Q
- (United States) K Kinnear
- (United States) D Wheaton
4
4

- (United States) F Montana
- (United States) J Pugh
3
2

2
- (Zimbabwe) B Black
- (United States) J Stark
6
6
