= 1993 Paris Open =

- Date: 1–8 November
- Edition: 21st
- Category: ATP Championship Series, Single-Week
- Draw: 48S / 24D
- Prize money: $1,915,000
- Surface: Carpet / indoor
- Location: Paris, France
- Venue: Palais omnisports de Paris-Bercy

Champions

Singles
- (Croatia) Goran Ivanišević

Doubles
- (Zimbabwe) Byron Black / (United States) Jonathan Stark
← 1992 ·	Paris Masters	· 1994 →

The 1993 Paris Open was a men's tennis tournament played on indoor carpet courts. It was the 21st edition of the Paris Masters, and was part of the ATP Championship Series, Single-Week of the 1993 ATP Tour. It took place at the Palais omnisports de Paris-Bercy in Paris, France, from 1 November through 8 November 1993. Ninth-seeded Goran Ivanišević won the singles title.

The draw was headlined by world No. 1 Pete Sampras, Jim Courier, and Boris Becker. Other top seeds were Michael Stich, Sergi Bruguera, Stefan Edberg, Michael Chang, and Goran Ivanišević.

== Finals ==
=== Singles ===
(Croatia) Goran Ivanišević defeated (Ukraine) Andriy Medvedev, 6–4, 6–2, 7–6^{(7–2)}

- It was Goran Ivanišević's 3rd title of the year and 9th of his career. It was his 1st Masters title of the year, and his 2nd overall.

=== Doubles ===
(Zimbabwe) Byron Black / (United States) Jonathan Stark defeated (Netherlands) Tom Nijssen / (Czech Republic) Cyril Suk, 4–6, 7–5, 6–2
