= 1995 Paris Open =

- Date: 30 October – 6 November
- Edition: 23rd
- Category: ATP Championship Series, Single Week
- Draw: 64S / 32D
- Prize money: $2,000,000
- Surface: Carpet / indoor
- Location: Paris, France
- Venue: Palais omnisports de Paris-Bercy

Champions

Singles
- (United States) Pete Sampras

Doubles
- (Canada) Grant Connell / (United States) Patrick Galbraith
← 1994 ·	Paris Masters	· 1996 →

The 1995 Paris Open was a men's tennis tournament played on indoor carpet courts that was part of the ATP Championship Series, Single Week of the 1995 ATP Tour. It was the 23rd edition of the tournament and took place at the Palais omnisports de Paris-Bercy in Paris, France, from 30 October through 6 November 1995. First-seeded Pete Sampras won the singles title and as a result regained his ATP world No. 1 ranking.

== Finals ==
=== Singles ===
(United States) Pete Sampras defeated (Germany) Boris Becker, 7–6^{(7–5)}, 6–4, 6–4

- It was Sampras' 5th singles title of the year and 36th of his career.

=== Doubles ===
(Canada) Grant Connell / (United States) Patrick Galbraith defeated (United States) Jim Grabb / (United States) Todd Martin, 6–2, 6–2
