= 1994 Paris Open – Singles =

Singles
- 1994 Paris Open

Final
- Champion: (United States) Andre Agassi
- Runner-up: (Switzerland) Marc Rosset
- Score: 6–3, 6–3, 4–6, 7–5

Details
- Draw: 48 (6 Q / 4 WC)
- Seeds: 16

Events
Singles	Doubles
← 1993 ·	Paris Open	· 1995 →

Andre Agassi defeated Marc Rosset in the final, 6–3, 6–3, 4–6, 7–5 to win the singles tennis title at the 1994 Paris Open.

Goran Ivanišević was the defending champion, but lost in the quarterfinals to Michael Chang.

== Seeds ==
A champion seed is indicated in bold text while text in italics indicates the round in which that seed was eliminated.

1. (United States) Pete Sampras (quarterfinals)
2. (Croatia) Goran Ivanišević (quarterfinals)
3. (Germany) Michael Stich (second round)
4. (Spain) Sergi Bruguera (semifinals)
5. (Sweden) Stefan Edberg (second round)
6. (Germany) Boris Becker (quarterfinals)
7. (United States) Michael Chang (semifinals)
8. (United States) **Andre Agassi (champion)**
9. (United States) Todd Martin (third round)
10. (South Africa) Wayne Ferreira (second round)
11. (Ukraine) Andriy Medvedev (second round)
12. (Russia) Yevgeny Kafelnikov (third round)
13. (United States) Jim Courier (second round)
14. (Switzerland) Marc Rosset (final)
15. (Austria) Thomas Muster (second round)
16. (Netherlands) Richard Krajicek (third round)

== Draw ==
=== Key ===
- Q = Qualifier
- WC = Wild card
- LL = Lucky loser
- Alt = Alternate
- ITF = ITF entry
- PR = Protected ranking
- SR = Special ranking
- SE = Special exempt
- JE = Junior exempt
- JR = Junior Accelerator Programme entrant
- CO = College Accelerator Programme entrant
- NG = Next Gen Accelerator Program entrant
- w/o = Walkover
- r = Retired
- d = Defaulted
- NB: The Final was the best of 5 sets.

=== Finals ===
Quarterfinals
1	(United States) Pete Sampras	6^{6}	5
8	**(United States) Andre Agassi**	**7^{8}**	**7**
4	**(Spain) Sergi Bruguera**	**6**	**7^{7}**
(Czech Republic) Petr Korda	3	6^{4}
6	(Germany) Boris Becker	6^{3}	6^{7}
14	**(Switzerland) Marc Rosset**	**7^{7}**	**7^{9}**
7	**(United States) Michael Chang**	3	**6**	**7^{7}**
2	(Croatia) Goran Ivanišević	**6**	4	6^{4}

Semifinals
8	**(United States) Andre Agassi**	**6**	**6**
4	(Spain) Sergi Bruguera	4	4
14	**(Switzerland) Marc Rosset**	6^{4}	**6**	**6**
7	(United States) Michael Chang	**7^{7}**	3	4

Final
8	**(United States) Andre Agassi**	**6**	**6**	4	**7**
14	(Switzerland) Marc Rosset	3	3	**6**	5

=== Top half ===
==== Section 1 ====
First round
Q	(France) T Guardiola	6^{4}	**6**	1
(Netherlands) **J Eltingh**	**7^{7}**	3	**6**
(Italy) **R Furlan**	6^{5}	**7^{7}**	**6**
Q	(United States) C Adams	**7^{7}**	6^{4}	4
(Spain) C Costa	4	3
Q	(Germany) **C-U Steeb**	**6**	**6**
(Australia) **J Stoltenberg**	5	**6**	**7^{10}**
(Russia) A Volkov	**7**	4	6^{8}

Second round
1	(United States) **P Sampras**	4	**6**	**6**
(Netherlands) J Eltingh	**6**	2	4
(Italy) R Furlan	3	3
16	(Netherlands) **R Krajicek**	**6**	**6**
9	(United States) **T Martin**	**6**	**6**
Q	(Germany) C-U Steeb	3	4
(Australia) J Stoltenberg	4	**6**	2
8	(United States) **A Agassi**	**6**	3	**6**

Third round
1	(United States) **P Sampras**	**6**	**7^{7}**
16	(Netherlands) R Krajicek	4	6^{3}
9	(United States) T Martin	2	5
8	(United States) **A Agassi**	**6**	**7**

Quarterfinals
1	(United States) P Sampras	6^{6}	5
8	(United States) **A Agassi**	**7^{8}**	**7**

==== Section 2 ====
First round
WC	(France) O Delaître	**6**	3	0
(Germany) **B Karbacher**	2	**6**	**6**
WC	(France) J-P Fleurian	6^{7}	6^{3}
(Australia) **M Woodforde**	**7^{9}**	**7^{7}**
Q	(Switzerland) **J Hlasek**	**7**	**6**
(Spain) J Sánchez	5	4
(Czech Republic) **P Korda**	**6**	**6**
Q	(United States) A Krickstein	3	1

Second round
4	(Spain) **S Bruguera**	**6**	**6**
(Germany) B Karbacher	4	3
(Australia) **M Woodforde**	**7^{7}**	**6**
13	(United States) J Courier	6^{3}	3
12	(Russia) **Y Kafelnikov**	**6**	**6**
Q	(Switzerland) J Hlasek	3	4
(Czech Republic) **P Korda**	4	**6**	**6**
5	(Sweden) S Edberg	**6**	1	4

Third round
4	(Spain) **S Bruguera**	**6**	**6**
(Australia) M Woodforde	4	4
12	(Russia) Y Kafelnikov	4	2
(Czech Republic) **P Korda**	**6**	**6**

Quarterfinals
4	(Spain) **S Bruguera**	**6**	**7^{7}**
(Czech Republic) P Korda	3	6^{4}

=== Bottom half ===
==== Section 3 ====
First round
(Netherlands) **P Haarhuis**	**7^{7}**	**6**
LL	(Czech Republic) D Vacek	6^{4}	2
WC	(France) G Raoux	4	4
(France) **G Forget**	**6**	**6**
(Peru) J Yzaga	**6**	3	1
(France) **A Boetsch**	4	**6**	**6**
(Germany) K Braasch	2	5
WC	(France) **L Roux**	**6**	**7**

Second round
6	(Germany) **B Becker**	4	**6**	**6**
(Netherlands) P Haarhuis	**6**	3	4
(France) **G Forget**	**6**	**2**
11	(Ukraine) A Medvedev	4	1	r
14	(Switzerland) **M Rosset**	**6**	**7^{7}**
(France) A Boetsch	4	6^{4}
WC	(France) **L Roux**	**6**	**6**
3	(Germany) M Stich	3	4

Third round
6	(Germany) **B Becker**	**7**	**7^{7}**
(France) G Forget	5	6^{3}
14	(Switzerland) **M Rosset**	**6**	3
WC	(France) L Roux	1	0^{r}

Quarterfinals
6	(Germany) B Becker	6^{3}	6^{7}
14	(Switzerland) **M Rosset**	**7^{7}**	**7^{9}**

==== Section 4 ====
First round
(United States) **D Wheaton**	**6**	**6**
(Italy) A Gaudenzi	2	3
(France) **C Pioline**	**6**	**6**
(Australia) P Rafter	4	2
(United States) R Reneberg	5	4
(Sweden) **M Larsson**	**7**	**6**
Q	(Zimbabwe) **B Black**	**6**	**6**
(Russia) A Chesnokov	1	4

Second round
7	(United States) **M Chang**	**7**	**6**
(United States) D Wheaton	5	4
(France) **C Pioline**	**6**	**6**
10	(South Africa) W Ferreira	4	4
15	(Austria) T Muster	**7^{7}**	6^{3}	5
(Sweden) **M Larsson**	6^{5}	**7^{7}**	**7**
Q	(Zimbabwe) B Black	4	4
2	(Croatia) **G Ivanišević**	**6**	**6**

Third round
7	(United States) **M Chang**	**6**	**7**
(France) C Pioline	4	5
(Sweden) M Larsson	4	6^{3}
2	(Croatia) **G Ivanišević**	**6**	**7^{7}**

Quarterfinals
7	(United States) **M Chang**	3	**6**	**7^{7}**
2	(Croatia) G Ivanišević	**6**	4	6^{4}
