= 1996 Paris Open – Doubles =

Doubles
- 1996 Paris Open
- 1995 Champions: (Canada) Grant Connell (United States) Patrick Galbraith

Final
- Champions: (Netherlands) Jacco Eltingh (Netherlands) Paul Haarhuis
- Runners-up: (Russia) Yevgeny Kafelnikov (Czech Republic) Daniel Vacek
- Score: 6–4, 4–6, 7–6

Details
- Draw: 24
- Seeds: 8

Events
| Singles | Doubles |
| ← 1995 · | Paris Open | · 1997 → |

Grant Connell and Patrick Galbraith were the defending champions but they competed with different partners that year, Connell with Byron Black and Galbraith with Jonathan Stark.

Galbraith and Stark lost in the first round to David Adams and Menno Oosting.

Black and Connell lost in the semifinals to Yevgeny Kafelnikov and Daniel Vacek.

Jacco Eltingh and Paul Haarhuis won in the final 6–4, 4–6, 7–6 against Kafelnikov and Vacek.

== Seeds ==
Champion seeds are indicated in bold text while text in italics indicates the round in which those seeds were eliminated. All eight seeded teams received byes into the second round.

1. (Australia) Todd Woodbridge / (Australia) Mark Woodforde (semifinals)
2. (Zimbabwe) Byron Black / (Canada) Grant Connell (semifinals)
3. (The Bahamas) Mark Knowles / (Canada) Daniel Nestor (quarterfinals)
4. (Russia) Yevgeny Kafelnikov / (Czech Republic) Daniel Vacek (final)
5. (France) Guy Forget / (Switzerland) Jakob Hlasek (second round)
6. (Netherlands) **Jacco Eltingh** / (Netherlands) **Paul Haarhuis (champions)**
7. (South Africa) Ellis Ferreira / (Netherlands) Jan Siemerink (second round)
8. (Canada) Sébastien Lareau / (United States) Alex O'Brien (second round)

== Draw ==
=== Key ===
- Q = Qualifier
- WC = Wild card
- LL = Lucky loser
- Alt = Alternate
- ITF = ITF entry
- PR = Protected ranking
- SR = Special ranking
- SE = Special exempt
- JE = Junior exempt
- JR = Junior Accelerator Programme entrant
- CO = College Accelerator Programme entrant
- NG = Next Gen Accelerator Program entrant
- w/o = Walkover
- r = Retired
- d = Defaulted

=== Final ===
Final

6
- (Netherlands) **Jacco Eltingh**
- (Netherlands) **Paul Haarhuis**
**6**
4
**7**

4
- (Russia) Yevgeny Kafelnikov
- (Czech Republic) Daniel Vacek
4
**6**
6

=== Top half ===
First round

Second round

Quarterfinals

Semifinals

1
- (Australia) **T Woodbridge**
- (Australia) **M Woodforde**
**6**
**6**

Q
- (Spain) **T Carbonell**
- (Spain) **F Roig**
6
**6**
**6**

Q
- (Spain) T Carbonell
- (Spain) F Roig
4
3

- (Australia) S Stolle
- (Australia) M Tebbutt
**7**
4
4

1
- (Australia) **T Woodbridge**
- (Australia) **M Woodforde**
**6**
**7**

- (Czech Republic) **P Korda**
- (Czech Republic) **C Suk**
**6**
**6**

- (Czech Republic) P Korda
- (Czech Republic) C Suk
1
6

- (Argentina) L Lobo
- (Spain) J Sánchez
3
4

- (Czech Republic) **P Korda**
- (Czech Republic) **C Suk**
**6**
**6**

8
- (Canada) S Lareau
- (United States) A O'Brien
3
3

1
- (Australia) T Woodbridge
- (Australia) M Woodforde
**6**
6
6

6
- (Netherlands) **J Eltingh**
- (Netherlands) **P Haarhuis**
4
**7**
**7**

3
- (The Bahamas) **M Knowles**
- (Canada) **D Nestor**
**7**
**6**

WC
- (United States) **J Courier**
- (France) **F Santoro**
**6**
**6**

WC
- (United States) J Courier
- (France) F Santoro
6
3

WC
- (France) A Boetsch
- (France) O Delaître
3
4

3
- (The Bahamas) M Knowles
- (Canada) D Nestor
3
2
r

WC
- (France) **J-P Fleurian**
- (France) **G Raoux**
**6**
**6**

6
- (Netherlands) **J Eltingh**
- (Netherlands) **P Haarhuis**
**6**
**5**

WC
- (United States) A Agassi
- (United States) L Jensen
3
3

WC
- (France) J-P Fleurian
- (France) G Raoux
5
6

6
- (Netherlands) **J Eltingh**
- (Netherlands) **P Haarhuis**
**7**
**7**

=== Bottom half ===
First round

Second round

Quarterfinals

Semifinals

5
- (France) G Forget
- (Switzerland) J Hlasek
**6**
6
6

- (South Africa) **D Adams**
- (Netherlands) **M Oosting**
**6**
6
**6**

- (South Africa) **D Adams**
- (Netherlands) **M Oosting**
4
**7**
**7**

- (United States) P Galbraith
- (United States) J Stark
4
**7**
2

- (South Africa) D Adams
- (Netherlands) M Oosting
**6**
2
4

- (United States) R Leach
- (Russia) A Olhovskiy
4
**6**
6

4
- (Russia) **Y Kafelnikov**
- (Czech Republic) **D Vacek**
4
**6**
**6**

- (United States) **J Grabb**
- (United States) **R Reneberg**
**6**
4
**7**

- (United States) J Grabb
- (United States) R Reneberg
3
5

4
- (Russia) **Y Kafelnikov**
- (Czech Republic) **D Vacek**
**6**
**7**

4
- (Russia) **Y Kafelnikov**
- (Czech Republic) **D Vacek**
5
**6**
**7**

2
- (Zimbabwe) B Black
- (Canada) G Connell
**7**
1
6

7
- (South Africa) E Ferreira
- (Netherlands) J Siemerink
2
4

- (Sweden) N Kulti
- (Australia) M Philippoussis
**6**
4
6

- (Czech Republic) **M Damm**
- (Czech Republic) **P Vízner**
**6**
**6**

- (Czech Republic) **M Damm**
- (Czech Republic) **P Vízner**
4
**6**
**7**

- (Czech Republic) M Damm
- (Czech Republic) P Vízner
**7**
3
5

- (United States) **T Kronemann**
- (Australia) **D Macpherson**
5
**7**
**6**

2
- (Zimbabwe) **B Black**
- (Canada) **G Connell**
6
**6**
**7**

- (Belgium) L Pimek
- (South Africa) B Talbot
**7**
6
4

- (United States) T Kronemann
- (Australia) D Macpherson
6
5

2
- (Zimbabwe) **B Black**
- (Canada) **G Connell**
**7**
**7**
