= 1994 Paris Open =

- Date: 31 October – 7 November
- Edition: 22nd
- Category: ATP Championship Series, Single-Wee
- Draw: 48S / 24D
- Prize money: $2,000,000
- Surface: Carpet / indoor
- Location: Paris, France
- Venue: Palais omnisports de Paris-Bercy

Champions

Singles
- (United States) Andre Agassi

Doubles
- (Netherlands) Jacco Eltingh / (Netherlands) Paul Haarhuis
← 1993 ·	Paris Masters	· 1995 →

The 1994 Paris Open was a men's tennis tournament played on indoor carpet courts. It was the 22nd edition of the Paris Masters, and is part of the ATP Championship Series, Single-Wee of the 1995 ATP Tour. It took place at the Palais omnisports de Paris-Bercy in Paris, France, from 31 October to 7 November 1994. Eighth-seeded Andre Agassi won the singles title.

The singles draw was headlined by ATP No. 1, Indian Wells, Key Biscayne, Rome, Wimbledon, U.S. Open titlist, Queen's finalist, Australian Open semi-finalist Pete Sampras, Kitzubhel, Tokyo (1994 ATP Tokyo Indoor winner), Stockholm, Bucharest, Wimbledon runner-up, Paris defending champion Goran Ivanišević and Rotterdam (1994 ABN Amro World Tennis Tournament), Munich, Halle champion, 1993 Tennis Masters Cup winner Michael Stich. Other top seeds were French Open titlist and Monte Carlo finalist Sergi Bruguera, Doha winner, 1990 Paris champion Stefan Edberg, Boris Becker, Michael Chang and Andre Agassi.

== Finals ==
=== Singles ===
(United States) Andre Agassi defeated (Switzerland) Marc Rosset, 6–3, 6–3, 4–6, 7–5

- It was Andre Agassi's 5th title of the year, and 24th of his career. It was his 2nd Masters title of the year and his 4th overall.

=== Doubles ===
(Netherlands) Jacco Eltingh / (Netherlands) Paul Haarhuis defeated (Zimbabwe) Byron Black / (United States) Jonathan Stark, 3–6, 7–6, 7–5
