= 1993 Paris Open – Doubles =

Doubles
- 1993 Paris Open

Final
- Champions: (Zimbabwe) Byron Black; (United States) Jonathan Stark
- Runners-up: (Netherlands) Tom Nijssen; (Czech Republic) Cyril Suk
- Score: 4–6, 7–5, 6–2

Details
- Draw: 24 (3WC/1Q)
- Seeds: 8

Events
Singles	Doubles
← 1992 ·	Paris Masters	· 1994 →

John McEnroe and Patrick McEnroe were the defending champions. John McEnroe did not participate this year. Patrick McEnroe partnered Richey Reneberg, losing in the second round.

Byron Black and Jonathan Stark won in the final 4–6, 7–5, 6–2, against Tom Nijssen and Cyril Suk.

== Seeds ==
All seeds receive a bye into the second round.

1. (Canada) Grant Connell / (United States) Patrick Galbraith (quarterfinals)
2. (Australia) Todd Woodbridge / (Australia) Mark Woodforde (quarterfinals)
3. (Australia) John Fitzgerald / (Sweden) Anders Järryd (second round)
4. (United States) Patrick McEnroe / (United States) Richey Reneberg (second round)
5. (Netherlands) Jacco Eltingh / (Netherlands) Paul Haarhuis (semifinals)
6. (United States) Luke Jensen / (United States) Murphy Jensen (second round)
7. (United States) Ken Flach / (United States) Rick Leach (second round)
8. (Australia) Mark Kratzmann / (Australia) Wally Masur (second round)

== Draw ==
=== Key ===
- Q = Qualifier
- WC = Wild card
- LL = Lucky loser
- Alt = Alternate
- SE = Special exempt
- PR = Protected ranking
- ITF = ITF entry
- JE = Junior exempt
- w/o = Walkover
- r = Retired
- d = Defaulted
- SR = Special ranking

=== Finals ===
Semifinals

Final

- (Netherlands) Tom Nijssen
- (Czech Republic) Cyril Suk
7
6

5
- (Netherlands) Jacco Eltingh
- (Netherlands) Paul Haarhuis
5
3

- (Netherlands) Tom Nijssen
- (Czech Republic) Cyril Suk
6
5
2

- (Zimbabwe) Byron Black
- (United States) Jonathan Stark
4
7
6

- (Zimbabwe) Byron Black
- (United States) Jonathan Stark
6
6

- (Sweden) Henrik Holm
- (Australia) Laurie Warder
4
4

=== Top half ===
First round

Second round

Quarterfinals

Semifinals

1
- (Canada) G Connell
- (United States) P Galbraith
7
6

- (Germany) M-C Goellner
- (South Africa) M Ondruska
7
6

- (Germany) M-C Goellner
- (South Africa) M Ondruska
6
2

- (United States) S DeVries
- (Australia) D Macpherson
5
3

1
- (Canada) G Connell
- (United States) P Galbraith
4
5

- (Netherlands) T Nijssen
- (Czech Republic) C Suk
6
6
7

- (Netherlands) T Nijssen
- (Czech Republic) C Suk
6
7

Q
- (United States) M Keil
- (Belgium) L Pimek
7
3
5

- (Netherlands) T Nijssen
- (Czech Republic) C Suk
1
6
7

7
- (United States) K Flach
- (United States) R Leach
6
3
6

- (Netherlands) T Nijssen
- (Czech Republic) C Suk
7
6

5
- (Netherlands) J Eltingh
- (Netherlands) P Haarhuis
5
3

4
- (United States) P McEnroe
- (United States) R Reneberg
2
6
3

- (Canada) G Michibata
- (United States) D Pate
5
0

- (Netherlands) M Oosting
- (United States) B Pearce
6
1
6

- (Netherlands) M Oosting
- (United States) B Pearce
7
6

- (Netherlands) M Oosting
- (United States) B Pearce
3
6

- (Sweden) S Edberg
- (Czech Republic) P Korda
4
7
6

5
- (Netherlands) J Eltingh
- (Netherlands) P Haarhuis
6
7

WC
- (France) R Gilbert
- (France) G Raoux
6
6
1

- (Sweden) S Edberg
- (Czech Republic) P Korda
5
5

5
- (Netherlands) J Eltingh
- (Netherlands) P Haarhuis
7
7

=== Bottom half ===
First round

Second round

Quarterfinals

Semifinals

6
- (United States) L Jensen
- (United States) M Jensen
6
5

- (South Africa) G Muller
- (South Africa) D Visser
6
3

- (South Africa) D Adams
- (Russia) A Olhovskiy
7
7

- (South Africa) D Adams
- (Russia) A Olhovskiy
7
6

- (South Africa) D Adams
- (Russia) A Olhovskiy
3
4

- (Zimbabwe) B Black
- (United States) J Stark
3
6
7

- (Zimbabwe) B Black
- (United States) J Stark
6
6

- (Netherlands) H Jan Davids
- (South Africa) P Norval
6
4
6

- (Zimbabwe) B Black
- (United States) J Stark
6
4
6

3
- (Australia) J Fitzgerald
- (Sweden) A Järryd
2
6
4

- (Zimbabwe) B Black
- (United States) J Stark
6
6

- (Sweden) H Holm
- (Australia) L Warder
4
4

8
- (Australia) M Kratzmann
- (Australia) W Masur
6
4

- (Sweden) H Holm
- (Australia) L Warder
6
6
6

- (Sweden) H Holm
- (Australia) L Warder
7
6

- (United States) S Cannon
- (United States) S Melville
7
4
2

- (Sweden) H Holm
- (Australia) L Warder
0
7
6

WC
- (France) A Boetsch
- (France) O Delaître
6
1
r

2
- (Australia) T Woodbridge
- (Australia) M Woodforde
6
6
4

WC
- (Switzerland) J Hlasek
- (France) H Leconte
4
6

WC
- (Switzerland) J Hlasek
- (France) H Leconte
1
6
6

2
- (Australia) T Woodbridge
- (Australia) M Woodforde
6
3
7

== Qualifying ==
=== Qualifying seeds ===
1. (South Africa) Wayne Ferreira / (United States) Jared Palmer (first round)
2. (United States) Mark Keil / (Belgium) Libor Pimek (qualified)

=== Qualifiers ===
1. (United States) Mark Keil / (Belgium) Libor Pimek

=== Qualifying draw ===
First round
1	(South Africa) Wayne Ferreira (United States) Jared Palmer	4	4
(South Africa) John-Laffnie de Jager (The Bahamas) Mark Knowles	6	6
WC	(France) Stéphane Huet (France) Lionel Roux	1	3
2	(United States) Mark Keil (Belgium) Libor Pimek	6	6

Qualifying competition
(South Africa) John-Laffnie de Jager (The Bahamas) Mark Knowles	6	5
2	(United States) Mark Keil (Belgium) Libor Pimek	7	7
