= 1996 Paris Open – Singles =

Singles
- 1996 Paris Open

Final
- Champion: (Sweden) Thomas Enqvist
- Runner-up: (Russia) Yevgeny Kafelnikov
- Score: 6–2, 6–4, 7–5

Details
- Draw: 48 (6 Q / 4 WC)
- Seeds: 16

Events
Singles	Doubles
← 1995 ·	Paris Open	· 1997 →

Thomas Enqvist defeated Yevgeny Kafelnikov in the final, 6–2, 6–4, 7–5 to win the singles tennis title at the 1996 Paris Open.

Pete Sampras was the defending champion, but lost in the second round to Marc Rosset.

== Seeds ==
A champion seed is indicated in bold text while text in italics indicates the round in which that seed was eliminated. All sixteen seeds received a bye into the second round.

1. (United States) Pete Sampras (second round)
2. (United States) Michael Chang (third round)
3. (Austria) Thomas Muster (second round)
4. (Russia) Yevgeny Kafelnikov (final)
5. (Croatia) Goran Ivanišević (second round)
6. (Germany) Boris Becker (second round)
7. (Netherlands) Richard Krajicek (second round)
8. (South Africa) Wayne Ferreira (third round)
9. (United States) Andre Agassi (second round)
10. (Chile) Marcelo Ríos (second round)
11. (United States) Todd Martin (third round)
12. (Sweden) **Thomas Enqvist (champion)**
13. (United States) MaliVai Washington (third round)
14. (Spain) Albert Costa (second round)
15. (United States) Jim Courier (second round)
16. (Spain) Félix Mantilla (third round)

== Draw ==
=== Key ===
- Q = Qualifier
- WC = Wild card
- LL = Lucky loser
- Alt = Alternate
- SE = Special exempt
- PR = Protected ranking
- ITF = ITF entry
- JE = Junior exempt
- w/o = Walkover
- r = Retired
- d = Defaulted
- SR = Special ranking

=== Finals ===
Quarterfinals
(Switzerland) Marc Rosset	2	**6**	2
**(Sweden) Magnus Gustafsson**	**6**	3	**6**
(Sweden) Stefan Edberg	4	6^{6}
12	**(Sweden) Thomas Enqvist**	**6**	**7^{8}**
(Netherlands) Paul Haarhuis	6^{7}	1
4	**(Russia) Yevgeny Kafelnikov**	**7^{9}**	**6**
Q	**(Czech Republic) Petr Korda**	**7^{7}**	**7^{8}**
(France) Arnaud Boetsch	6^{2}	6^{6}

Semifinals
(Sweden) Magnus Gustafsson	3	2
12	(Sweden) **Thomas Enqvist**	**6**	**6**
4	(Russia) **Yevgeny Kafelnikov**	3	**6**	**6**
Q	(Czech Republic) Petr Korda	**6**	4	2

Final
12	(Sweden) **Thomas Enqvist**	**6**	**6**	**7**
4	(Russia) Yevgeny Kafelnikov	2	4	5

=== Top half ===
==== Section 1 ====
First round
(Switzerland) **M Rosset**	**6**	**6**
(Spain) À Corretja	2	4
Q	(Zimbabwe) **B Black**	**7^{7}**	4	**6**
(Australia) J Stoltenberg	6^{3}	**6**	1
(Sweden) **M Gustafsson**	**6**	4	**6**
Q	(Italy) C Caratti	3	**6**	0
(Spain) J Sánchez	3	6^{3}
(Czech Republic) **D Vacek**	**6**	**7^{7}**

Second round
1	(United States) P Sampras	4	4
(Switzerland) **M Rosset**	**6**	**6**
Q	(Zimbabwe) B Black	1	**7**	2
16	(Spain) **F Mantilla**	**6**	5	**6**
9	(United States) A Agassi	4	**6**	3
(Sweden) **M Gustafsson**	**6**	3	**6**
(Czech Republic) D Vacek	6^{4}	4
8	(South Africa) **W Ferreira**	**7^{7}**	**6**

Third round
(Switzerland) **M Rosset**	**7**	3	**7^{7}**
16	(Spain) F Mantilla	5	**6**	6^{2}
(Sweden) **M Gustafsson**	**6**	**6**
8	(South Africa) W Ferreira	2	4

Quarterfinals
(Switzerland) M Rosset	2	**6**	2
(Sweden) **M Gustafsson**	**6**	3	**6**

==== Section 2 ====
First round
(Sweden) **S Edberg**	**6**	**6**
(Germany) M Stich	2	4
(Spain) F Clavet	**7^{7}**	4	3
Q	(Netherlands) **F Wibier**	6^{3}	**6**	**6**
(United States) **R Reneberg**	3	**6**	**7**
WC	(France) G Forget	**6**	4	5
(United Kingdom) T Henman	**6**	3	4
(Spain) **C Moyá**	4	**6**	**6**

Second round
3	(Austria) T Muster	2	r
(Sweden) **S Edberg**	**6**
Q	(Netherlands) **F Wibier**	3	**6**	**6**
14	(Spain) A Costa	**6**	4	4
12	(Sweden) **T Enqvist**	**6**	**7**
(United States) R Reneberg	4	5
(Spain) **C Moyá**	**6**	5	**6**
6	(Germany) B Becker	3	**7**	4

Third round
(Sweden) **S Edberg**	4	**6**	**6**
Q	(Netherlands) F Wibier	**6**	4	2
12	(Sweden) **T Enqvist**	**6**	**7^{7}**
(Spain) C Moyá	2	6^{4}

Quarterfinals
(Sweden) S Edberg	4	6^{6}
12	(Sweden) **T Enqvist**	**6**	**7^{8}**

=== Bottom half ===
==== Section 3 ====
First round
(Netherlands) J Siemerink	**6**	6^{6}	4
(Netherlands) **P Haarhuis**	3	**7^{8}**	**6**
Q	(Sweden) **M Larsson**	**6**	**6**
(Czech Republic) B Ulihrach	4	1
Q	(Czech Republic) **M Damm**	**7^{9}**	**6**
WC	(France) G Raoux	6^{7}	2
WC	(Spain) S Bruguera	4	3
(France) **C Pioline**	**6**	**6**

Second round
5	(Croatia) G Ivanišević	3	2
(Netherlands) **P Haarhuis**	**6**	**6**
Q	(Sweden) M Larsson	3	**6**	3
11	(United States) **T Martin**	**6**	3	**6**
13	(United States) **M Washington**	**6**	**6**
Q	(Czech Republic) M Damm	4	2
(France) C Pioline	4	**6**	4
4	(Russia) **Y Kafelnikov**	**6**	3	**6**

Third round
(Netherlands) **P Haarhuis**	**6**	3	**7^{7}**
11	(United States) T Martin	4	**6**	6^{4}
13	(United States) M Washington	4	3
4	(Russia) **Y Kafelnikov**	**6**	**6**

Quarterfinals
(Netherlands) P Haarhuis	6^{7}	1
4	(Russia) **Y Kafelnikov**	**7^{9}**	**6**

==== Section 4 ====
First round
(Spain) **A Berasategui**	**6**	**6**
(Italy) R Furlan	2	2
Q	(Czech Republic) **P Korda**	**6**	5	**6**
(Australia) M Woodforde	4	**7**	2
(France) **A Boetsch**	**7**	**7^{7}**
(Australia) T Woodbridge	5	6^{3}
(Australia) **M Philippoussis**	**6**	**6**
WC	(France) L Roux	4	4

Second round
7	(Netherlands) R Krajicek	**6**	1	5
(Spain) **A Berasategui**	3	**6**	**7**
Q	(Czech Republic) **P Korda**	**6**	**6**
10	(Chile) M Ríos	3	4
15	(United States) J Courier	4	5
(France) **A Boetsch**	**6**	**7**
(Australia) M Philippoussis	5	**6**	6^{7}
2	(United States) **M Chang**	**7**	3	**7^{9}**

Third round
(Spain) A Berasategui	1	4
Q	(Czech Republic) **P Korda**	**6**	**6**
(France) **A Boetsch**	**6**	**6**
2	(United States) M Chang	1	3

Quarterfinals
Q	(Czech Republic) **P Korda**	**7^{7}**	**7^{8}**
(France) A Boetsch	6^{2}	6^{6}
