= 1996 Paris Open =

- Date: 28 October – 3 November
- Edition: 24th
- Category: Super 9
- Draw: 48S / 24D
- Prize money: $2,550,000
- Surface: Carpet / indoor
- Location: Paris, France
- Venue: Palais omnisports de Paris-Bercy

Champions

Singles
- (Sweden) Thomas Enqvist

Doubles
- (Netherlands) Jacco Eltingh / (Netherlands) Paul Haarhuis
| ← 1995 · | Paris Masters | · 1997 → |

The 1996 Paris Open was a men's tennis tournament played on indoor carpet courts. It was the 24th edition of the Paris Masters and was part of the Mercedes Super 9 of the 1996 ATP Tour. It took place at the Palais Omnisports de Paris-Bercy in Paris in France from 28 October through 4 November 1996. Thomas Enqvist won the singles.

== Finals ==
=== Singles ===
(Sweden) Thomas Enqvist defeated (Russia) Yevgeny Kafelnikov 6–2, 6–4, 7–5

- It was Enqvist's 2nd title of the year and the 7th of his career. It was his 1st Masters title of the year and his 1st overall.

=== Doubles ===
(Netherlands) Jacco Eltingh / (Netherlands) Paul Haarhuis defeated (Russia) Yevgeny Kafelnikov / (Czech Republic) Daniel Vacek 6–4, 4–6, 7–6

- It was Eltingh's 2nd title of the year and the 32nd of his career. It was Haarhuis' 3rd title of the year and the 31st of his career.
