= Jonathan Stark (tennis) =

American tennis player (born 1971)

- Country (sports): United States
- Residence: Portland, Oregon, U.S.
- Born: April 3, 1971 (age 55) Medford, Oregon, U.S.
- Height: 1.88 m (6 ft 2 in)
- Turned pro: 1991
- Retired: 2001
- Plays: Right-handed (two-handed backhand)
- Prize money: $3,220,867

Singles
- Career record: 136–151
- Career titles: 2
- Highest ranking: No. 36 (28 February 1994)

Grand Slam singles results
- Australian Open: 2R (1994, 1998)
- French Open: 3R (1993)
- Wimbledon: 3R (1996)
- US Open: 2R (1992, 1998)

Doubles
- Career record: 303–186
- Career titles: 19
- Highest ranking: No. 1 (1 August 1994)

Grand Slam doubles results
- Australian Open: F (1994)
- French Open: W (1994)
- Wimbledon: QF (1992, 1993)
- US Open: QF (1995)

Grand Slam mixed doubles results
- French Open: 2R (1995)
- Wimbledon: W (1995)
- US Open: QF (1995)
- Last updated on: 18 December 2021.

Jonathan Stark (born April 3, 1971) is a former professional tennis player from the United States. During his career he won two Grand Slam doubles titles (the 1994 French Open Men's Doubles and the 1995 Wimbledon Championships Mixed Doubles). Stark reached the world No. 1 doubles ranking in 1994.

== Early life ==
Stark was born in Medford, Oregon. He reached the finals of the 1989 Boys' Junior National Tennis Championship Boys' 18 singles, losing to Chuck Adams. In college, he played for Stanford University, where he was a singles and doubles All-American in 1990 and 1991. He reached the NCAA doubles final in 1991, partnering Jared Palmer. On July 17, 1997, he married Dana, and they have two sons and a daughter. He was coached by Donald Bozarth and became one of the top juniors.

== Professional tennis ==
Stark turned professional in 1991 and joined the ATP Tour. In 1992, he won his first tour doubles title at Wellington. His first top-level singles title came in 1993 at Bolzano (beating Cédric Pioline in the final).

In 1994, Stark captured the men's doubles title at the French Open, partnering Byron Black (the pair were also runners-up at the Australian Open that year). He reached his career-high singles ranking of World No. 36 in February. The following year, Stark won the Wimbledon mixed doubles title, partnering Martina Navratilova.

Stark won his second top-level singles title in 1996 at Singapore (beating Michael Chang in the final). He was a member of the 1997 U.S. Davis Cup team. In 1997, Stark won the doubles title at the ATP Tour World Championships, partnering Rick Leach. The final doubles title of Stark's career came in 2001 at Long Island.

Over the course of his career, Stark won two top-level singles titles and 19 tour doubles titles. His career prize-money totaled US$3,220,867. Stark retired from the professional tour in 2001, lives in Portland, Oregon, and coaches with Portland-based Oregon Elite Tennis. He was inducted into the Oregon Sports Hall of Fame in 2009.

== Junior Grand Slam finals ==
=== Singles: 1 (1 title) ===
Result	Year	Championship	Surface	Opponent	Score
Win	1989	US Open	Hard	(Sweden) Nicklas Kulti	6–4, 6–1

=== Doubles: 3 (3 titles) ===
Result	Year	Championship	Surface	Partner	Opponents	Score
Win	1987	French Open	Clay	(United States) Jim Courier	(Argentina) Franco Davín (Argentina) Guillermo Perez-Roldan	6–7, 6–4, 6–3
Win	1988	US Open	Hard	(United States) John Yancey	(Italy) Massimo Boscatto (Italy) Stefano Pescosolido	7–6, 7–5
Win	1989	Wimbledon	Grass	(United States) Jared Palmer	(South Africa) John-Laffnie De Jager (South Africa) Wayne Ferreira	7–6^{(7–4)}, 7–6^{(7–2)}

== ATP career finals ==
=== Singles: 3 (2 titles / 1 runner-up) ===
Legend Grand Slam Tournaments (0–0) ATP World Tour Finals (0–0) ATP World Tour Masters Series (0–0) ATP Championship Series (0–0) ATP World Series (2–1)	Finals by surface Hard (0–0) Clay (0–0) Grass (0–1) Carpet (2–0)	Finals by setting Outdoors (0–1) Indoors (2–0)

Result	W–L	Date	Tournament	Tier	Surface	Opponent	Score
Loss	0–1	Jun 1992	Rosmalen, Netherlands	World Series	Grass	(Germany) Michael Stich	4–6, 5–7
Win	1–1	Oct 1993	Bolzano, Italy	World Series	Carpet	(France) Cédric Pioline	6–3, 6–2
Win	2–1	Oct 1996	Singapore, Singapore	World Series	Carpet	(United States) Michael Chang	6–4, 6–4

=== Doubles: 40 (19 titles / 21 runners-up) ===
Legend Grand Slam (1) Tennis Masters Cup (1) ATP Masters Series (2) ATP Championship Series (4) ATP Tour (11)	Titles by surface Hard (11) Clay (3) Grass (1) Carpet (4)

Result	W-L	Date	Tournament	Surface	Partner	Opponent	Score
Win	1–0	Jan 1992	Wellington, New Zealand	Hard	(United States) Jared Palmer	(Netherlands) Michiel Schapers (Czech Republic) Daniel Vacek	6–3, 6–3
Loss	1–1	Aug 1992	Cincinnati, U.S.	Hard	(United States) Patrick McEnroe	(Australia) Mark Woodforde (Australia) Todd Woodbridge	3–6, 6–1, 3–6
Loss	1–2	Oct 1992	Brisbane, Australia	Hard (i)	(United States) Patrick McEnroe	(United States) Steve DeVries (Australia) David Macpherson	4–6, 4–6
Win	2–2	Oct 1992	Sydney Indoor, Australia	Hard (i)	(United States) Patrick McEnroe	(United States) Jim Grabb (United States) Richey Reneberg	6–2, 6–3
Loss	2–3	Feb 1993	San Francisco, U.S.	Hard (i)	(United States) Patrick McEnroe	(United States) Scott Davis (Netherlands) Jacco Eltingh	1–6, 6–4, 5–7
Loss	2–4	Mar 1993	Miami, U.S.	Hard	(United States) Patrick McEnroe	(Netherlands) Richard Krajicek (Netherlands) Jan Siemerink	7–6, 4–6, 6–7
Win	3–4	May 1993	Coral Springs, U.S.	Clay	(United States) Patrick McEnroe	(United States) Paul Annacone (United States) Doug Flach	6–4, 6–3
Win	4–4	Jun 1993	Rosmalen, Netherlands	Grass	(United States) Patrick McEnroe	(South Africa) David Adams (Russia) Andrei Olhovskiy	7–6, 1–6, 6–4
Win	5–4	Oct 1993	Basel, Switzerland	Hard (i)	(Zimbabwe) Byron Black	(United States) Brad Pearce (United States) David Randall	3–6, 7–5, 6–3
Win	6–4	Oct 1993	Toulouse, France	Hard (i)	(Zimbabwe) Byron Black	(Germany) David Prinosil (Germany) Udo Riglewski	7–5, 7–6
Win	7–4	Oct 1993	Vienna, Austria	Carpet	(Zimbabwe) Byron Black	(United States) Mike Bauer (Germany) David Prinosil	6–3, 7–6
Win	8–4	Nov 1993	Paris, France	Carpet	(Zimbabwe) Byron Black	(Netherlands) Tom Nijssen (Czech Republic) Cyril Suk	4–6, 7–5, 6–2
Loss	8–5	Jan 1994	Oahu, U.S.	Hard	(United States) Alex O'Brien	(Netherlands) Tom Nijssen (Czech Republic) Cyril Suk	4–6, 4–6
Loss	8–6	Jan 1994	Australian Open, Melbourne	Hard	(Zimbabwe) Byron Black	(Netherlands) Jacco Eltingh (Netherlands) Paul Haarhuis	7–6, 3–6, 4–6, 3–6
Loss	8–7	Feb 1994	San Jose, U.S.	Hard (i)	(Zimbabwe) Byron Black	(United States) Rick Leach (United States) Jared Palmer	6–4, 4–6, 4–6
Win	9–7	Feb 1994	Memphis, U.S.	Hard (i)	(Zimbabwe) Byron Black	(United States) Jim Grabb (United States) Jared Palmer	7–6, 6–4
Loss	9–8	Feb 1994	Indian Wells, U.S.	Hard	(Zimbabwe) Byron Black	(Canada) Grant Connell (United States) Patrick Galbraith	5–7, 3–6
Win	10–8	Jun 1994	French Open, Paris	Clay	(Zimbabwe) Byron Black	(Sweden) Jan Apell (Sweden) Jonas Björkman	6–4, 7–6
Win	11–8	Aug 1994	Montreal, Canada	Hard	(Zimbabwe) Byron Black	(United States) Patrick McEnroe (United States) Jared Palmer	6–6, 6–4
Loss	11–9	Oct 1994	Sydney Indoor, Australia	Hard (i)	(Zimbabwe) Byron Black	(Netherlands) Jacco Eltingh (Netherlands) Paul Haarhuis	4–6, 6–7
Loss	11–10	Oct 1994	Tokyo Indoor, Japan	Hard	(Zimbabwe) Byron Black	(Canada) Grant Connell (United States) Patrick Galbraith	3–6, 6–3, 4–6
Loss	11–11	Nov 1994	Paris, France	Carpet	(Zimbabwe) Byron Black	(Netherlands) Jacco Eltingh (Netherlands) Paul Haarhuis	6–3, 6–7, 5–7
Win	12–11	Feb 1995	Philadelphia, U.S.	Carpet	(United States) Jim Grabb	(Netherlands) Jacco Eltingh (Netherlands) Paul Haarhuis	7–6, 6–7, 6–3
Win	13–11	Apr 1995	Tokyo Outdoor, Japan	Hard	(The Bahamas) Mark Knowles	(Australia) John Fitzgerald (Sweden) Anders Järryd	6–3, 3–6, 7–6
Win	14–11	May 1995	Bologna, Italy	Clay	(Zimbabwe) Byron Black	(Belgium) Libor Pimek (United States) Vince Spadea	7–5, 6–3
Loss	14–12	Feb 1996	San Jose, U.S.	Hard (i)	(United States) Richey Reneberg	(United States) Trevor Kronemann (Australia) David Macpherson	4–6, 6–3, 3–6
Win	15–12	Apr 1996	Seoul, South Korea	Hard	(United States) Rick Leach	(United States) Kent Kinnear (Zimbabwe) Kevin Ullyett	6–4, 6–4
Win	16–12	Nov 1996	Stockholm, Sweden	Hard (i)	(United States) Patrick Galbraith	(United States) Todd Martin (United States) Chris Woodruff	7–6, 6–4
Loss	16–13	Jan 1997	Auckland, New Zealand	Hard	(United States) Rick Leach	(South Africa) Ellis Ferreira (United States) Patrick Galbraith	4–6, 6–4, 6–7
Loss	16–14	Feb 1997	Memphis, U.S.	Hard (i)	(United States) Rick Leach	(South Africa) Ellis Ferreira (United States) Patrick Galbraith	2–6, 3–6
Loss	16–15	Oct 1997	Singapore	Carpet	(United States) Rick Leach	(India) Mahesh Bhupathi (India) Leander Paes	4–6, 4–6
Loss	16–16	Oct 1997	Stuttgart Indoor, Germany	Carpet	(United States) Rick Leach	(Australia) Todd Woodbridge (Australia) Mark Woodforde	3–6, 3–6
Loss	16–17	Nov 1997	Paris, France	Carpet	(United States) Rick Leach	(Netherlands) Jacco Eltingh (Netherlands) Paul Haarhuis	2–6, 6–7
Win	17–17	Nov 1997	Doubles Championships, Hartford	Carpet	(United States) Rick Leach	(India) Mahesh Bhupathi (India) Leander Paes	6–3, 6–4, 7–6^{(3)}
Loss	17–18	Mar 1998	Miami, U.S.	Hard	(United States) Alex O’Brien	(South Africa) Ellis Ferreira (United States) Rick Leach	2–6, 4–6
Loss	17–19	Jun 2000	London/Queen's Club, England	Grass	(Philippines) Eric Taino	(Australia) Mark Woodforde (Australia) Todd Woodbridge	7–6^{(5)}, 3–6, 6–7^{(1)}
Win	18–19	Aug 2000	Long Island, U.S.	Hard	(Zimbabwe) Kevin Ullyett	(United States) Jan-Michael Gambill (United States) Scott Humphries	6–4, 6–4
Loss	18–20	Feb 2001	Memphis, U.S.	Hard (i)	(United States) Alex O’Brien	(United States) Bob Bryan (United States) Mike Bryan	3–6, 6–7^{(3)}
Loss	18–21	Mar 2001	San Jose, U.S.	Hard (i)	(United States) Jan-Michael Gambill	(The Bahamas) Mark Knowles (United States) Brian MacPhie	3–6, 6–7
Win	19–21	Aug 2001	Long Island, U.S.	Hard	(Zimbabwe) Kevin Ullyett	(Czech Republic) Leoš Friedl (Czech Republic) Radek Štěpánek	6–1, 6–4

==== Mixed doubles: 1 (1-0) ====
Result	Year	Championship	Partner	Opponents	Score
Win	1995	Wimbledon	(United States) Martina Navratilova	(United States) Gigi Fernández (Czech Republic) Cyril Suk	6–4, 6–4

== ATP Challenger and ITF Futures finals ==
=== Singles: 2 (2–0) ===
Legend ATP Challenger (2–0) ITF Futures (0–0)	Finals by surface Hard (2–0) Clay (0–0) Grass (0–0) Carpet (0–0)

Result	W–L	Date	Tournament	Tier	Surface	Opponent	Score
Win	1–0	Oct 1991	Ponte Vedra, United States	Challenger	Hard	(New Zealand) Kelly Evernden	6–3, 6–1
Win	2–0	Oct 1993	Brest, France	Challenger	Hard	(France) Guillaume Raoux	7–6, 6–3

=== Doubles: 3 (2–1) ===
Legend ATP Challenger (2–1) ITF Futures (0–0)	Finals by surface Hard (2–0) Clay (0–0) Grass (0–1) Carpet (0–0)

Result	W–L	Date	Tournament	Tier	Surface	Partner	Opponents	Score
Win	1–0	Sep 1998	Urbana, United States	Challenger	Hard	(United States) Jared Palmer	(United States) Doug Flach (United States) Mark Merklein	6–4, 7–6
Win	2–0	Oct 1998	Dallas, United States	Challenger	Hard	(United States) Jared Palmer	(Australia) Michael Hill (United States) Scott Humphries	6–3, 6–4
Loss	2–1	Jun 2000	Surbiton, United Kingdom	Challenger	Grass	(United States) Jared Palmer	(South Africa) Jeff Coetzee (South Africa) Marcos Ondruska	6–7^{(3–7)}, 6–7^{(6–8)}

== Performance timelines ==
Key
W	F	SF	QF	#R	RR	Q#	DNQ	A	NH

(W) winner; (F) finalist; (SF) semifinalist; (QF) quarterfinalist; (#R) rounds 4, 3, 2, 1; (RR) round-robin stage; (Q#) qualification round; (DNQ) did not qualify; (A) absent; (NH) not held; (SR) strike rate (events won / competed); (W–L) win–loss record.

=== Singles ===
Tournament	1989	1990	1991	1992	1993	1994	1995	1996	1997	1998	1999	SR	W–L	Win %
Grand Slam tournaments
Australian Open	A	A	A	Q2	3R	2R	1R	1R	1R	2R	Q2	0 / 6	4–6	40%
French Open	A	A	A	A	3R	2R	1R	A	2R	Q2	A	0 / 4	4–4	50%
Wimbledon	Q3	A	A	1R	1R	1R	2R	3R	2R	A	Q3	0 / 6	4–6	40%
US Open	A	A	A	2R	1R	1R	1R	1R	1R	2R	Q2	0 / 7	2–7	22%
Win–loss	0–0	0–0	0–0	1–2	4–4	2–4	1–4	2–3	2–4	2–2	0–0	0 / 23	14–23	38%
ATP Masters Series
Indian Wells	A	A	A	1R	2R	3R	Q3	2R	3R	Q2	Q1	0 / 5	6–5	55%
Miami	A	A	A	4R	1R	3R	2R	2R	1R	2R	Q1	0 / 7	7–7	50%
Rome	A	A	A	A	A	A	A	A	1R	A	A	0 / 1	0–1	0%
Canada	A	A	A	3R	A	1R	2R	A	2R	A	A	0 / 4	4–4	50%
Cincinnati	A	A	A	1R	1R	2R	1R	Q3	2R	A	Q1	0 / 5	2–5	29%
Stuttgart	A	A	A	A	A	A	A	A	A	1R	A	0 / 1	0–1	0%
Paris	A	A	A	A	A	Q2	Q1	Q3	A	A	A	0 / 0	0–0	–
Win–loss	0–0	0–0	0–0	5–4	1–3	4–4	2–3	2–2	4–5	1–2	0–0	0 / 23	19–23	45%

=== Doubles ===
Tournament	1988	1989	1990	1991	1992	1993	1994	1995	1996	1997	1998	1999	2000	2001	2002	SR	W–L	Win %
Grand Slam tournaments
Australian Open	A	A	A	A	QF	3R	F	1R	A	SF	3R	QF	A	2R	1R	0 / 9	20–9	69%
French Open	A	A	A	A	A	1R	W	2R	SF	QF	1R	3R	1R	A	A	1 / 8	16–7	70%
Wimbledon	A	A	A	A	QF	QF	3R	3R	2R	3R	A	3R	1R	2R	A	0 / 9	16–9	64%
US Open	1R	1R	A	3R	3R	1R	3R	QF	2R	1R	2R	2R	1R	2R	A	0 / 13	13–13	50%
Win–loss	0–1	0–1	0–0	2–1	8–3	5–4	15–3	6–4	6–3	9–4	3–3	8–4	0–3	3–3	0–1	1 / 39	65–38	63%
Year-end Championships
ATP Finals	Did not qualify						RR	DNQ		W	Did not qualify					1 / 2	5–3	63%
ATP Masters Series
Indian Wells	A	A	A	A	1R	2R	F	2R	2R	QF	SF	1R	2R	1R	A	0 / 10	11–10	52%
Miami	A	A	A	A	1R	F	SF	SF	2R	QF	F	3R	1R	1R	A	0 / 10	18–10	64%
Monte Carlo	A	A	A	A	A	A	A	A	A	A	A	A	A	1R	A	0 / 1	0–1	0%
Hamburg	A	A	A	A	A	A	A	A	A	A	A	1R	A	A	A	0 / 1	0–1	0%
Rome	A	A	A	A	A	A	A	A	A	SF	A	2R	A	A	A	0 / 2	4–2	67%
Canada	A	A	A	A	2R	A	W	2R	A	2R	A	A	2R	A	A	1 / 5	7–4	64%
Cincinnati	A	A	A	A	F	QF	QF	SF	2R	1R	A	1R	A	A	A	0 / 7	10–7	59%
Stuttgart	A	A	A	A	A	A	A	A	A	F	1R	1R	A	A	A	0 / 3	3–3	50%
Paris	A	A	A	A	A	W	F	2R	1R	F	SF	2R	A	A	A	1 / 7	15–6	71%
Win–loss	0–0	0–0	0–0	0–0	5–4	12–3	14–4	5–5	2–4	14–7	10–4	4–7	2–3	0–3	0–0	2 / 46	68–44	61%

=== Mixed doubles ===
Tournament	1992	1993	1994	1995	1996	1997	1998	1999	2000	SR	W–L	Win %
Grand Slam tournaments
Australian Open	A	A	A	A	A	A	A	A	A	0 / 0	0–0	–
French Open	A	A	A	2R	A	A	A	A	A	0 / 1	0–1	0%
Wimbledon	QF	A	2R	W	QF	A	A	A	1R	1 / 5	13–4	76%
US Open	A	A	A	QF	A	A	A	A	2R	0 / 2	3–2	60%
Win–loss	3–1	0–0	1–1	8–2	3–1	0–0	0–0	0–0	1–2	1 / 8	16–7	70%
