= Guillaume Raoux =

French tennis player

- Country (sports): France
- Residence: Boca Raton, Florida, United States
- Born: 14 February 1970 (age 56) Bagnols-sur-Cèze, France
- Height: 1.80 m (5 ft 11 in)
- Turned pro: 1989
- Retired: 2000
- Plays: Right-handed (one-handed backhand)
- Prize money: $2,446,506

Singles
- Career record: 179–225
- Career titles: 1; 6 Challenger, 0 Futures
- Highest ranking: No. 35 (8 June 1998)

Grand Slam singles results
- Australian Open: 4R (1998)
- French Open: 2R (1995, 1997, 1998)
- Wimbledon: 3R (1997)
- US Open: 2R (1991, 1996, 1997, 1998)

Other tournaments
- Olympic Games: 1R (1996)

Doubles
- Career record: 102–105
- Career titles: 4; 4 Challenger, 0 Futures
- Highest ranking: No. 35 (5 August 1996)

Grand Slam doubles results
- Australian Open: 2R (1995, 1996)
- French Open: QF (1989)
- Wimbledon: QF (1996)
- US Open: 3R (1995, 1997)

Grand Slam mixed doubles results
- Australian Open: 1R (1996)
- French Open: 3R (1999)
- Wimbledon: 2R (1997)
- Last updated on: 10 December 2021.

Guillaume Raoux (French pronunciation: [ɡijom ʁa.u]; born 14 February 1970) is a French former tennis player.

== Career ==
Raoux reached the Wimbledon junior singles final in 1988. He turned professional in 1989.

=== Pro tour ===
The right-hander won one singles career title (Queensland Open, 1992), and achieved a career-high singles ranking of world No. 35 in June 1998. Raoux reached the fourth round of the 1998 Australian Open and the quarterfinals of the Paris Masters in 1990 and 1997.

He was the first man to be beaten by Roger Federer on the ATP Tour.

Raoux represented his native country at the 1996 Summer Olympics in Atlanta where he was defeated in the first round by Zimbabwe's Byron Black.

== Junior Grand Slam finals ==
=== Singles: 1 (1 runner-up) ===
Result	Year	Tournament	Surface	Opponent	Score
Loss	1988	Wimbledon	Grass	(Venezuela) Nicolás Pereira	6–7, 2–6

== ATP career finals ==
=== Singles: 5 (1 title, 4 runner-ups) ===
Legend Grand Slam Tournaments (0–0) ATP World Tour Finals (0–0) ATP Masters Series (0–0) ATP Championship Series (0–0) ATP World Series (1–4)	Finals by surface Hard (1–1) Clay (0–0) Grass (0–1) Carpet (0–2)	Finals by setting Outdoors (0–2) Indoors (1–2)

Result	W–L	Date	Tournament	Tier	Surface	Opponent	Score
Loss	0–1	Nov 1991	Birmingham, United Kingdom	World Series	Carpet	(United States) Michael Chang	3–6, 2–6
Win	1–1	Sep 1992	Brisbane, Australia	World Series	Hard	(Denmark) Kenneth Carlsen	6–4, 7–6^{(12–10)}
Loss	1–2	Mar 1995	St. Petersburg, Russia	World Series	Carpet	(Russia) Yevgeny Kafelnikov	2–6, 2–6
Loss	1–3	Apr 1995	Johannesburg, South Africa	World Series	Hard	(Germany) Martin Sinner	1–6, 4–6
Loss	1–4	Jun 1997	Rosmalen, Netherlands	World Series	Grass	(Netherlands) Richard Krajicek	4–6, 6–7^{(7–9)}

=== Doubles: 7 (4 titles, 3 runner-ups) ===
Legend Grand Slam Tournaments (0–0) ATP World Tour Finals (0–0) ATP Masters Series (0–0) ATP Championship Series (0–0) ATP World Series (4–3)	Finals by surface Hard (3–2) Clay (0–0) Grass (1–0) Carpet (0–1)	Finals by setting Outdoors (3–1) Indoors (1–2)

Result	W–L	Date	Tournament	Tier	Surface	Partner	Opponents	Score
Win	1–0	Jan 1993	Jakarta, Indonesia	World Series	Hard	(Italy) Diego Nargiso	(Netherlands) Jacco Eltingh (Netherlands) Paul Haarhuis	7–6, 6–7, 6–3
Loss	1–1	Sep 1994	Bordeaux, France	World Series	Hard	(Italy) Diego Nargiso	(France) Olivier Delaître (France) Guy Forget	2–6, 6–2, 5–7
Loss	1–2	Mar 1995	Copenhagen, Denmark	World Series	Carpet	(Canada) Greg Rusedski	(United States) Mark Keil (Sweden) Peter Nyborg	7–6, 4–6, 6–7
Win	2–2	Apr 1995	Johannesburg, South Africa	World Series	Hard	(France) Rodolphe Gilbert	(Germany) Martin Sinner (Netherlands) Joost Winnink	6–4, 3–6, 6–3
Win	3–2	Feb 1996	Marseille, France	World Series	Hard	(France) Jean-Philippe Fleurian	(South Africa) Marius Barnard (Sweden) Peter Nyborg	6–3, 6–2
Loss	3–3	Oct 1996	Toulouse, France	World Series	Hard	(France) Olivier Delaître	(Netherlands) Jacco Eltingh (Netherlands) Paul Haarhuis	3–6, 5–7
Win	4–3	Jun 1998	's-Hertogenbosch, Netherlands	World Series	Grass	(Netherlands) Jan Siemerink	(Australia) Joshua Eagle (Australia) Andrew Florent	6–3, 3–6, 6–1

== ATP Challenger and ITF Futures Finals ==
=== Singles: 8 (6–2) ===
Legend ATP Challenger (6–2) ITF Futures (0–0)	Finals by surface Hard (5–2) Clay (0–0) Grass (0–0) Carpet (1–0)

Result	W–L	Date	Tournament	Tier	Surface	Opponent	Score
Win	1–0	Apr 1989	Le Gosier, Guadeloupe	Challenger	Hard	(Senegal) Yahiya Doumbia	7–6, 4–6, 7–6
Win	2–0	Mar 1990	Martinique, Martinique	Challenger	Hard	(United States) Robbie Weiss	3–6, 6–3, 6–3
Win	3–0	Sep 1990	Gevrey-Chambertin, France	Challenger	Carpet	(Sweden) Henrik Holm	2–6, 6–4, 6–4
Win	4–0	Aug 1992	Segovia, Spain	Challenger	Hard	(Germany) Joern Renzenbrink	7–6, 7–6
Loss	4–1	Oct 1993	Brest, France	Challenger	Hard	(United States) Jonathan Stark	6–7, 3–6
Loss	4–2	Aug 1994	Istanbul, Turkey	Challenger	Hard	(Germany) Markus Zoecke	7–6, 4–6, 2–6
Win	5–2	Nov 1995	Nantes, France	Challenger	Hard	(United States) Jeff Tarango	6–2, 7–5
Win	6–2	Oct 1996	Brest, France	Challenger	Hard	(Slovakia) Karol Kučera	6–4, 4–6, 6–1

=== Doubles: 4 (4–0) ===
Legend ATP Challenger (4–0) ITF Futures (0–0)	Finals by surface Hard (4–0) Clay (0–0) Grass (0–0) Carpet (0–0)

Result	W–L	Date	Tournament	Tier	Surface	Partner	Opponents	Score
Win	1–0	Mar 1990	Martinique, Martinique	Challenger	Hard	(France) Olivier Delaître	(United States) Todd Nelson (The Bahamas) Roger Smith	6–3, 7–5
Win	2–0	Nov 1994	Nantes, France	Challenger	Hard	(France) Olivier Delaître	(Belgium) Dick Norman (Canada) Greg Rusedski	6–4, 7–6
Win	3–0	Aug 1995	Segovia, Spain	Challenger	Hard	(France) Rodolphe Gilbert	(Spain) Sergio Casal (Spain) Emilio Sánchez	6–4, 6–3
Win	4–0	Oct 1995	Brest, France	Challenger	Hard	(France) Olivier Delaître	(United States) Kent Kinnear (United States) Dave Randall	7–5, 6–7, 6–4

== Performance timelines ==
Key
W	F	SF	QF	#R	RR	Q#	DNQ	A	NH

(W) winner; (F) finalist; (SF) semifinalist; (QF) quarterfinalist; (#R) rounds 4, 3, 2, 1; (RR) round-robin stage; (Q#) qualification round; (DNQ) did not qualify; (A) absent; (NH) not held; (SR) strike rate (events won / competed); (W–L) win–loss record.

=== Singles ===
Tournament	1988	1989	1990	1991	1992	1993	1994	1995	1996	1997	1998	1999	2000	SR	W–L	Win %
Grand Slam tournaments
Australian Open	A	1R	A	1R	1R	3R	3R	1R	3R	2R	4R	2R	A	0 / 10	11–10	52%
French Open	1R	1R	1R	1R	1R	1R	1R	2R	1R	2R	2R	1R	1R	0 / 13	3–13	19%
Wimbledon	A	Q1	2R	1R	1R	1R	1R	1R	2R	3R	1R	1R	Q2	0 / 10	4–10	29%
US Open	A	A	A	2R	1R	1R	1R	1R	2R	2R	2R	1R	A	0 / 9	4–9	31%
Win–loss	0–1	0–2	1–2	1–4	0–4	2–4	2–4	1–4	4–4	5–4	5–4	1–4	0–1	0 / 42	22–42	34%
ATP Masters Series
Indian Wells	A	A	A	1R	A	A	A	A	A	A	1R	A	A	0 / 2	0–2	0%
Miami	A	A	2R	1R	A	4R	A	A	2R	1R	2R	1R	A	0 / 7	6–7	46%
Monte Carlo	A	A	A	A	A	A	A	1R	A	A	A	A	A	0 / 1	0–1	0%
Hamburg	A	A	A	A	A	2R	A	A	A	A	1R	A	A	0 / 2	1–2	33%
Rome	A	A	A	A	A	2R	A	A	A	A	1R	A	A	0 / 2	1–2	33%
Canada	A	A	A	3R	1R	A	A	A	A	3R	2R	2R	A	0 / 5	6–5	55%
Cincinnati	A	A	A	A	A	1R	A	A	1R	1R	2R	A	A	0 / 4	1–4	20%
Stuttgart^{1}	A	A	A	A	A	A	A	A	A	A	2R	A	A	0 / 1	1–1	50%
Paris	A	A	QF	A	1R	2R	1R	2R	1R	QF	1R	1R	A	0 / 9	8–9	47%
Win–loss	0–0	0–0	4–2	2–3	0–2	6–5	0–1	1–2	1–3	5–4	4–8	1–3	0–0	0 / 33	24–33	42%

=== Doubles ===
Tournament	1989	1990	1991	1992	1993	1994	1995	1996	1997	1998	1999	2000	SR	W–L	Win %
Grand Slam tournaments
Australian Open	A	A	A	A	A	A	2R	2R	A	A	A	A	0 / 2	2–2	50%
French Open	QF	2R	1R	1R	1R	3R	1R	2R	1R	1R	1R	2R	0 / 12	8–12	40%
Wimbledon	3R	1R	Q3	2R	A	A	2R	QF	1R	A	A	A	0 / 6	7–6	54%
US Open	A	A	A	A	A	A	3R	2R	3R	A	A	A	0 / 3	5–3	63%
Win–loss	5–2	1–2	0–1	1–2	0–1	2–1	4–4	6–4	2–3	0–1	0–1	1–1	0 / 23	22–23	49%
ATP Masters Series
Miami	A	A	A	A	A	A	A	3R	3R	A	A	A	0 / 2	4–2	67%
Monte Carlo	A	A	A	A	A	A	1R	A	A	A	A	A	0 / 1	0–1	0%
Rome	A	A	A	A	Q1	A	A	A	A	A	A	A	0 / 0	0–0	–
Canada	A	A	A	A	A	A	A	A	A	A	1R	A	0 / 1	0–1	0%
Cincinnati	A	A	A	A	A	A	A	1R	A	A	A	A	0 / 1	0–1	0%
Paris	A	A	A	2R	1R	A	SF	2R	1R	2R	2R	A	0 / 7	7–7	50%
Win–loss	0–0	0–0	0–0	1–1	0–1	0–0	3–2	3–3	2–2	1–1	1–2	0–0	0 / 12	11–12	48%
