= Arnaud Boetsch =

French tennis player (born 1969)

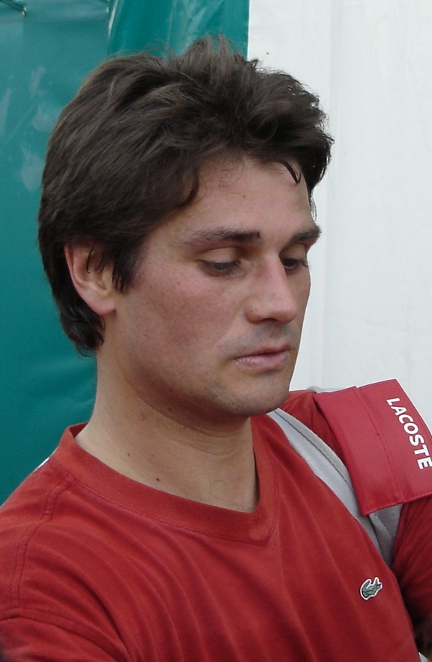
- Boetsch in 2005
- Full name: Arnaud Benjamin Boetsch
- Country (sports): France
- Residence: Geneva, Switzerland
- Born: 1 April 1969 (age 57) Meulan, France
- Height: 1.83 m (6 ft 0 in)
- Turned pro: 1987
- Retired: 1999
- Plays: Right-handed (one-handed backhand)
- Prize money: $3,031,247

Singles
- Career record: 231–202
- Career titles: 3
- Highest ranking: No. 12 (22 April 1996)

Grand Slam singles results
- Australian Open: 4R (1993)
- French Open: 4R (1991)
- Wimbledon: 4R (1992)
- US Open: 4R (1996)

Other tournaments
- Olympic Games: 2R (1996)

Doubles
- Career record: 67–75
- Career titles: 2
- Highest ranking: No. 97 (18 October 1993)

Grand Slam doubles results
- Australian Open: 1R (1995)
- French Open: QF (1995)
- Wimbledon: 3R (1993)

Other doubles tournaments
- Olympic Games: 1R (1996)

Grand Slam mixed doubles results
- French Open: 2R (1987, 1989)

Team competitions
- Davis Cup: W (1991, 1996)
- Last updated on: 6 May 2022.

Arnaud Benjamin Boetsch (French: [aʁno bœtʃ]; born 1 April 1969) is a French former tennis player who turned professional in 1987. Known for his stylish single-handed backhand, he won three career titles, reaching his highest ATP singles ranking of world No. 12 in April 1996.

== Tennis career ==
Boetsch reached the fourth round once in each of the four grand slams between 1991 and 1996, notably beating Richard Krajicek in five sets in his 1992 Wimbledon run (Krajicek would go on to win the title four years later).

Boetsch represented France at the 1996 Summer Olympics in Atlanta, where he was defeated in the second round by Spain's eventual Silver medal winner Sergi Bruguera.

He currently works as a tennis commentator for France Télévisions with Lionel Chamoulaud or François Brabant.

== ATP career finals ==
=== Singles: 10 (3 titles, 7 runner-ups) ===
Legend Grand Slam Tournaments (0–0) ATP World Tour Finals (0–0) ATP Masters 1000 Series (0–0) ATP 500 Series (0–0) ATP 250 Series (3–7)	Finals by surface Hard (2–1) Clay (0–0) Grass (1–0) Carpet (0–6)	Finals by setting Outdoors (3–1) Indoors (0–6)

Result	W–L	Date	Tournament	Tier	Surface	Opponent	Score
Loss	0–1	Oct 1991	Berlin, Germany	Grand Prix	Carpet	(Czech Republic) Petr Korda	3–6, 4–6
Loss	0–2	Oct 1992	Bolzano, Italy	World Series	Carpet	(Sweden) Thomas Enqvist	2–6, 6–1, 6–7^{(7–9)}
Win	1–2	Jan 1993	Rosmalen, Netherlands	World Series	Grass	(Australia) Wally Masur	3–6, 6–3, 6–3
Win	2–2	Oct 1993	Toulouse, France	World Series	Hard (i)	(France) Cédric Pioline	7–6^{(7–5)}, 3–6, 6–3
Loss	2–3	Feb 1994	Marseille, France	World Series	Carpet	(Switzerland) Marc Rosset	6–7^{(6–8)}, 6–7^{(4–7)}
Loss	2–4	Oct 1994	Ostrava, Czech Republic	World Series	Carpet	(United States) MaliVai Washington	6–4, 3–6, 3–6
Loss	2–5	Jan 1995	Adelaide, Australia	World Series	Hard	(United States) Jim Courier	2–6, 5–7
Win	3–5	Oct 1995	Toulouse, France	World Series	Hard (i)	(United States) Jim Courier	6–4, 6–7^{(5–7)}, 6–0
Loss	3–6	Nov 1995	Stockholm, Sweden	International Series	Carpet	(Sweden) Thomas Enqvist	5–7, 4–6
Loss	3–7	Oct 1996	Lyon, France	World Series	Carpet	(Russia) Yevgeny Kafelnikov	5–7, 3–6

=== Doubles: 5 (2 titles, 3 runners-up) ===
Legend Grand Slam Tournaments (0–0) ATP World Tour Finals (0–0) ATP Masters Series (0–0) ATP Championship Series (0–0) ATP World Series (2–3)	Finals by surface Hard (1–1) Clay (0–2) Grass (0–0) Carpet (1–0)	Finals by setting Outdoors (0–3) Indoors (2–0)

Result	W–L	Date	Tournament	Tier	Surface	Partner	Opponents	Score
Win	1–0	Sep 1991	Bordeaux, France	World Series	Hard	(France) Guy Forget	(Germany) Patrik Kühnen (Germany) Alexander Mronz	6–2, 6–2
Loss	1–1	Sep 1992	Bordeaux, France	World Series	Clay	(France) Guy Forget	(Spain) Sergio Casal (Spain) Emilio Sánchez	1–6, 4–6
Win	2–1	Feb 1993	Marseille, France	World Series	Carpet	(France) Olivier Delaître	(United States) Ivan Lendl (South Africa) Christo van Rensburg	6–3, 7–6
Loss	2–2	Aug 1993	Long Island, United States	World Series	Hard	(France) Olivier Delaître	(Germany) Marc-Kevin Goellner (Germany) David Prinosil	7–6, 5–7, 2–6
Loss	2–3	Jul 1995	Gstaad, Switzerland	World Series	Clay	(Switzerland) Marc Rosset	(Argentina) Luis Lobo (Spain) Javier Sánchez	7–6, 6–7, 6–7

== ATP Challenger and ITF Futures finals ==
=== Singles: 2 (0–2) ===
Legend ATP Challenger (0–2) ITF Futures (0–0)	Finals by surface Hard (0–0) Clay (0–1) Grass (0–1) Carpet (0–0)

Result	W–L	Date	Tournament	Tier	Surface	Opponent	Score
Loss	0-1	Aug 1989	Geneva, Switzerland	Challenger	Clay	(Israel) Gilad Bloom	4–6, 1–6
Loss	0-2	Jul 1990	Bristol, United Kingdom	Challenger	Grass	(Germany) Christian Saceanu	3–6, 7–6, 1–6

=== Doubles: 2 (0–2) ===
Legend ATP Challenger (0–2) ITF Futures (0–0)	Finals by surface Hard (0–0) Clay (0–1) Grass (0–1) Carpet (0–0)

Result	W–L	Date	Tournament	Tier	Surface	Partner	Opponents	Score
Loss	0–1	Aug 1989	Geneva, Switzerland	Challenger	Clay	(Czech Republic) Slava Doseděl	(Germany) Peter Ballauff (Italy) Ugo Pigato	4–6, 3–6
Loss	0–2	Jul 1990	Bristol, United Kingdom	Challenger	Grass	(Sweden) Peter Nyborg	(Russia) Andrei Olhovskiy (Finland) Olli Rahnasto	5–7, 4–6

== Performance timelines ==
Key
W	F	SF	QF	#R	RR	Q#	DNQ	A	NH

(W) winner; (F) finalist; (SF) semifinalist; (QF) quarterfinalist; (#R) rounds 4, 3, 2, 1; (RR) round-robin stage; (Q#) qualification round; (DNQ) did not qualify; (A) absent; (NH) not held; (SR) strike rate (events won / competed); (W–L) win–loss record.

=== Singles ===
Tournament	1985	1986	1987	1988	1989	1990	1991	1992	1993	1994	1995	1996	1997	1998	1999	SR	W–L	Win %
Grand Slam tournaments
Australian Open	A	A	A	A	A	A	Q1	2R	4R	2R	1R	2R	3R	1R	A	0 / 7	8–7	53%
French Open	A	A	1R	2R	2R	3R	4R	1R	1R	3R	3R	2R	3R	A	2R	0 / 12	15–12	56%
Wimbledon	Q1	A	Q2	A	Q2	Q3	3R	4R	3R	1R	3R	1R	1R	A	A	0 / 7	9–7	56%
US Open	A	A	A	A	A	A	3R	3R	3R	1R	1R	4R	2R	Q1	A	0 / 7	10–7	59%
Win–loss	0–0	0–0	0–1	1–1	1–1	2–1	7–3	6–4	7–4	3–4	4–4	5–4	5–4	0–1	1–1	0- / 33	42–33	56%
Olympic Games
Summer Olympics	Not Held			A	Not Held			A	Not Held			2R	Not Held			0- / 1	1–1	50%
ATP Masters Series
Indian Wells	A	A	A	A	A	A	A	2R	2R	1R	2R	3R	A	A	A	0 / 5	5–5	50%
Miami	A	A	A	A	2R	A	2R	2R	3R	2R	1R	SF	3R	A	A	0 / 8	9–8	53%
Monte Carlo	A	A	A	A	A	A	A	SF	1R	1R	1R	2R	3R	A	A	0 / 6	7–6	54%
Hamburg	A	A	A	A	A	A	2R	A	A	A	1R	3R	1R	Q1	A	0 / 4	2–4	33%
Rome	A	A	A	A	A	1R	A	1R	2R	1R	1R	1R	2R	A	A	0 / 7	2–7	22%
Canada	A	A	A	A	A	A	1R	A	A	A	2R	1R	1R	A	A	0 / 4	1–4	20%
Cincinnati	A	A	A	A	A	A	A	A	A	A	1R	A	1R	A	A	0 / 2	0–2	0%
Stuttgart	A	A	A	A	A	A	A	A	A	A	A	2R	A	A	A	0 / 1	1–1	50%
Paris	A	A	A	A	A	A	3R	3R	SF	2R	2R	QF	A	A	A	0 / 6	13–6	68%
Win–loss	0–0	0–0	0–0	0–0	1–1	0–1	4–4	8–5	7–5	1–5	3–8	12–8	4–6	0–0	0–0	0- / 43	40–43	48%

=== Doubles ===
Tournament	1987	1988	1989	1990	1991	1992	1993	1994	1995	1996	1997	1998	1999	SR	W–L	Win %
Grand Slam tournaments
Australian Open	A	A	A	A	A	A	A	A	1R	A	A	A	A	0 / 1	0–1	0%
French Open	2R	2R	2R	1R	2R	1R	1R	1R	QF	1R	1R	A	1R	0 / 12	7–12	37%
Wimbledon	Q1	A	Q2	1R	Q3	2R	3R	A	A	A	A	A	A	0 / 3	3–3	50%
US Open	A	A	A	A	A	A	A	A	A	A	A	A	A	0 / 0	0–0	–
Win–loss	1–1	1–1	1–1	0–2	1–1	1–2	2–2	0–1	3–2	0–1	0–1	0–0	0–1	0 / 16	10–16	38%
Olympic Games
Summer Olympics	NH	A	Not Held			A	Not Held			1R	Not Held			0 / 1	0–1	0%
ATP Masters Series
Indian Wells	A	A	A	A	A	A	A	A	A	1R	A	A	A	0 / 1	0–1	0%
Miami	A	A	3R	A	A	A	1R	2R	1R	1R	A	A	A	0 / 5	3–5	38%
Monte Carlo	A	A	A	A	A	1R	A	QF	Q1	1R	2R	A	A	0 / 4	3–4	43%
Hamburg	A	A	A	A	2R	A	A	A	A	A	A	A	A	0 / 1	1–1	50%
Rome	A	A	A	A	A	A	Q1	A	A	1R	Q1	A	A	0 / 1	0–1	0%
Cincinnati	A	A	A	A	A	A	A	A	1R	A	A	A	A	0 / 1	0–1	0%
Paris	A	A	A	A	1R	QF	1R	A	A	1R	A	A	A	0 / 4	3–4	43%
Win–loss	0–0	0–0	2–1	0–0	1–2	3–2	0–2	3–2	0–2	0–5	1–1	0–0	0–0	0 / 17	10–17	37%
