= Todd Martin =

American tennis player

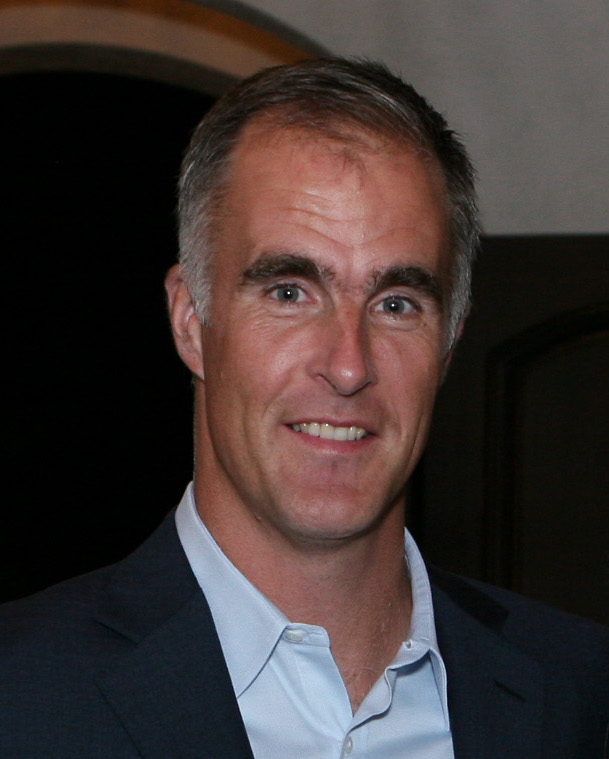
- Country (sports): United States
- Residence: Newport, Rhode Island, United States
- Born: July 8, 1970 (age 56) Hinsdale, Illinois, US
- Height: 6 ft 6 in (1.98 m)
- Turned pro: 1990
- Retired: 2004
- Plays: Right-handed (two-handed backhand)
- Prize money: $8,232,355

Singles
- Career record: 411–234 (63.7%)
- Career titles: 8
- Highest ranking: No. 4 (13 September 1999)

Grand Slam singles results
- Australian Open: F (1994)
- French Open: 4R (1991)
- Wimbledon: SF (1994, 1996)
- US Open: F (1999)

Other tournaments
- Tour Finals: RR (1999)
- Grand Slam Cup: F (1995)
- Olympic Games: 1R (2000)

Doubles
- Career record: 100–85 (54.1%)
- Career titles: 5
- Highest ranking: No. 30 (29 April 1996)

Grand Slam doubles results
- Australian Open: 2R (1994)
- French Open: 3R (1993)
- Wimbledon: 3R (1994)
- US Open: 2R (1990, 1991, 1992)

Grand Slam mixed doubles results
- French Open: 3R (1998)
- Last updated on: 3 November 2021.

Todd Martin (born July 8, 1970) is an American retired tennis player. He reached the men's singles final at the 1994 Australian Open and the 1999 US Open and achieved a career-high singles ranking of world No. 4.

== Playing career ==
Martin was born in Hinsdale, Illinois, and played tennis for two years at Northwestern University before turning professional in 1990. His parents lived in Lansing, Michigan, where Martin went to nearby East Lansing High School. At Northwestern, he was a member of the Delta Tau Delta fraternity. He won his first top-level singles title in 1993 at Coral Springs, Florida. Martin traveled with good friend David Helfer for much of the '92 season. Helfer went on to play at Kalamazoo College.

1994 proved to be a breakout year for Martin. Coached by Robert Van't Hof, at the year's first Grand Slam tournament, he reached the men's singles final at the Australian Open, where he lost in straight sets to No. 1 Pete Sampras. At Wimbledon, he made it to the semifinals, before falling to the eventual champion Sampras; the set that Martin took from Sampras in the match was the only set that Sampras lost during the entire tournament. Martin's third Grand Slam semifinal of 1994 came at the US Open, where he again fell to the eventual champion, this time Andre Agassi. He also captured singles titles at Queen's Club and the Regions Morgan Keegan Championships in Memphis, the latter of which was the first back-to-back titles.

Martin was a member of the US team Davis Cup for nine consecutive years and part of the championship squad in 1995 (beating Russia 3–2 in the final). He also reached the final of the 1995 Grand Slam Cup, where he lost in straight sets to Goran Ivanišević. He reached the Wimbledon semifinals again in 1996, but eventually lost 10-8 in the fifth set against MaliVai Washington, after holding a 5–1 lead in the final set and serving for the match twice. Martin would later reflect on the outcome and admit that he choked during the crucial moments of the match. He missed most of the 1997 season due to injury, but came back to win two singles titles in Barcelona and Stockholm in 1998.

In 1999, Martin had a solid year, reaching the quarterfinals of both the Australian Open and Wimbledon, and reached his second Grand Slam final at the US Open. Along the way, Martin had a memorable battle with Greg Rusedski in the fourth round, in which Rusedski held numerous advantages, including a two sets to love lead, serving for the match in the third set, and a 4–1 advantage in the fifth. Yet, Martin was able to prevail in five sets. Martin won 20 of the final 21 points of the match, despite playing with a heavily bandaged leg and dealing with dehydration. In the final, he faced Andre Agassi in a five-set contest, which Agassi eventually won. Martin won another singles title in Sydney that year, and reached his career-high singles ranking of No. 4.

In 2000, Martin again turned in a strong performance at the US Open, reaching the semifinals before falling to the eventual champion, Marat Safin, in straight sets. As with the previous year's tournament, Martin made another grueling comeback from a two-set deficit in the fourth round, this time against Carlos Moyà.

Martin was named the ATP's Most Improved Player in 1993, and won its Sportsmanship Award in 1993 and 1994. He was president of ATP Players Council for 1995–97 and 1998–99.

From 1994 to 1996, Martin was coached by Robert Van't Hof; from 1997 to 2002, he was coached by Dean Goldfine.

In his career, Martin won eight singles and five doubles titles. He retired from the professional tour in 2004. He was the CEO of the International Tennis Hall of Fame until the end of 2022. He is currently the Tournament Director for the Western & Southern Open and is also the Head of Tennis for Beemok Sports and Entertainment.

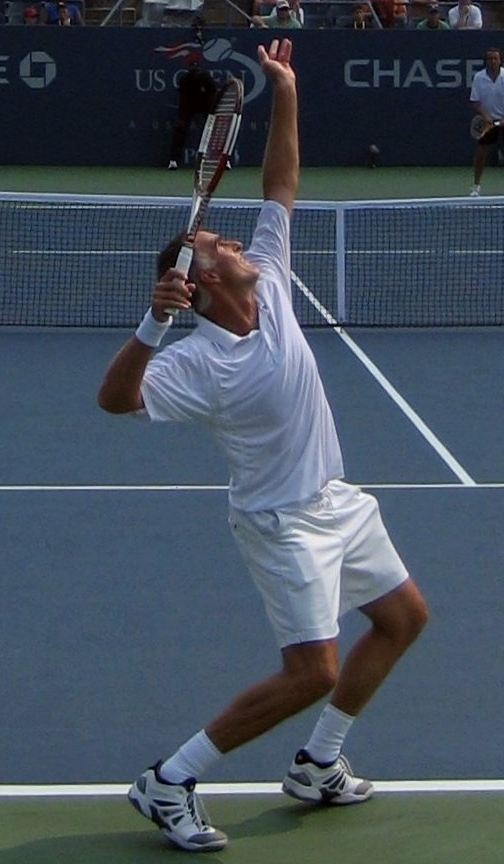
Martin serving at the 2006 U.S. Open.

== Grand Slam finals ==
=== Singles: 2 (0–2) ===
Result	Date	Championship	Surface	Opponent	Score
Loss	1994	Australian Open	Hard	(United States) Pete Sampras	6–7^{(4–7)}, 4–6, 4–6
Loss	1999	US Open	Hard	(United States) Andre Agassi	4–6, 7–6^{(7–5)}, 7–6^{(7–2)}, 3–6, 2–6

== Other significant finals ==
=== Grand Slam Cup finals ===
==== Singles: 1 (0–1) ====
Result	Year	Tournament	Surface	Opponent	Score
Loss	1995	Grand Slam Cup	Carpet (i)	(Croatia) Goran Ivanišević	6–7^{(4–7)}, 3–6, 4–6

=== Masters Series finals ===
==== Singles: 1 (0–1) ====
Result	Year	Tournament	Surface	Opponent	Score
Loss	1993	Canada Masters	Hard	(Sweden) Mikael Pernfors	6–2, 2–6, 5–7

== ATP career finals ==
=== Singles: 20 (8 titles, 12 runner-ups) ===
Legend Grand Slam tournaments (0–2) ATP World Tour Finals (0–1) ATP Masters Series (0–1) ATP Championship Series (3–4) ATP World Series (5–4)	Titles by surface Hard (5–7) Clay (2–3) Grass (1–0) Carpet (0–2)	Titles by setting Outdoor (0–0) Indoor (0–0)

Result	W–L	Date	Tournament	Tier	Surface	Opponent	Score
Loss	0–1	Feb 1993	Memphis, United States	Championship Series	Hard	(United States) Jim Courier	7–5, 6–7^{(4–7)}, 6–7^{(4–7)}
Win	1–1	May 1993	Coral Springs, United States	World Series	Clay	(United States) David Wheaton	6–3, 6–4
Loss	1–2	Jul 1993	Washington, United States	Championship Series	Hard	(Israel) Amos Mansdorf	6–7^{(3–7)}, 5–7
Loss	1–3	Aug 1993	Montreal, Canada	Masters Series	Hard	(Sweden) Mikael Pernfors	6–2, 2–6, 5–7
Loss	1–4	Oct 1993	Tokyo, Japan	Championship Series	Carpet	(United States) Ivan Lendl	4–6, 4–6
Loss	1–5	Jan 1994	Melbourne, Australia	Grand Slam	Hard	(United States) Pete Sampras	6–7^{(4–7)}, 4–6, 4–6
Win	2–5	Feb 1994	Memphis, United States	Championship Series	Hard	(United States) Brad Gilbert	6–4, 7–5
Loss	2–6	May 1994	Atlanta, United States	World Series	Clay	(United States) Michael Chang	7–6^{(7–4)}, 6–7^{(4–7)}, 0–6
Loss	2–7	May 1994	Pinehurst, United States	World Series	Clay	(United States) Jared Palmer	4–6, 6–7^{(5–7)}
Win	3–7	Jun 1994	Queen's, United Kingdom	World Series	Grass	(United States) Pete Sampras	7–6^{(7–4)}, 7–6^{(7–4)}
Win	4–7	Feb 1995	Memphis, United States	Championship Series	Hard	(Netherlands) Paul Haarhuis	7–6^{(7–2)}, 6–4
Loss	4–8	Dec 1995	Grand Slam Cup, Germany	ATP Finals	Carpet	(Croatia) Goran Ivanišević	6–7^{(4–7)}, 3–6, 4–6
Win	5–8	Jan 1996	Sydney, Australia	World Series	Hard	(Croatia) Goran Ivanišević	5–7, 6–3, 6–4
Loss	5–9	Feb 1996	Memphis, United States	Championship Series	Hard	(United States) Pete Sampras	4–6, 6–7^{(2–7)}
Loss	5–10	Nov 1996	Stockholm, Sweden	World Series	Hard	(Sweden) Thomas Enqvist	5–7, 4–6, 6–7^{(0–7)}
Win	6–10	Apr 1998	Barcelona, Spain	Championship Series	Clay	(Spain) Alberto Berasategui	6–2, 1–6, 6–3, 6–2
Win	7–10	Nov 1998	Stockholm, Sweden	World Series	Hard	(Sweden) Thomas Johansson	6–3, 6–4, 6–4
Win	8–10	Jan 1999	Sydney, Australia	World Series	Hard	(Spain) Alex Corretja	6–3, 7–6^{(7–5)}
Loss	8–11	Apr 1999	Estoril, Portugal	World Series	Clay	(Spain) Albert Costa	6–7^{(4–7)}, 6–2, 3–6
Loss	8–12	Sep 1999	New York, United States	Grand Slam	Hard	(United States) Andre Agassi	4–6, 7–6^{(7–5)}, 7–6^{(7–2)}, 3–6, 2–6

=== Doubles: 10 (5 titles, 5 runner-ups) ===
Legend Grand Slam tournaments (0–0) ATP World Tour Finals (0–0) ATP Masters Series (1–2) ATP Championship Series Gold (1–1) ATP World Series (3–2)	Finals by surface Hard (2–3) Clay (2–1) Grass (1–0) Carpet (0–1)	Finals by setting Outdoor (5–3) Indoor (0–2)

Result	W–L	Date	Tournament	Tier	Surface	Partner	Opponents	Score
Loss	0–1	May 1993	Atlanta, United States	World Series	Clay	(United States) Jared Palmer	(United States) Paul Annacone (United States) Richey Reneberg	4–6, 6–7
Win	1–1	May 1993	Tampa, United States	World Series	Clay	(United States) Derrick Rostagno	(United States) Kelly Jones (United States) Jared Palmer	6–3, 6–4
Win	2–1	Aug 1993	Indianapolis, United States	Championship Series	Hard	(United States) Scott Davis	(United States) Ken Flach (United States) Rick Leach	6–4, 6–4
Win	3–1	Apr 1995	Paget, Bermuda	World Series	Clay	(Canada) Grant Connell	(New Zealand) Brett Steven (Australia) Jason Stoltenberg	7–6, 2–6, 7–5
Win	4–1	Jun 1995	Queen's, United Kingdom	World Series	Grass	(United States) Pete Sampras	(Sweden) Jan Apell (Sweden) Jonas Björkman	7–6, 6–4
Loss	4–2	Aug 1995	Indianapolis, United States	Championship Series	Hard	(United States) Scott Davis	(Canada) Daniel Nestor (The Bahamas) Mark Knowles	4–6, 4–6
Loss	4–3	Nov 1995	Paris, France	Masters Series	Carpet	(United States) Jim Grabb	(Canada) Grant Connell (United States) Patrick Galbraith	2–6, 2–6
Loss	4–4	Nov 1996	Stockholm, Sweden	World Series	Hard	(United States) Chris Woodruff	(United States) Jonathan Stark (United States) Patrick Galbraith	6–7, 4–6
Loss	4–5	Mar 1998	Indian Wells, United States	Masters Series	Hard	(United States) Richey Reneberg	(Sweden) Jonas Björkman (Australia) Patrick Rafter	4–6, 6–7
Win	5–5	Aug 2002	Cincinnati, United States	Masters Series	Hard	(United States) James Blake	(India) Mahesh Bhupathi (Belarus) Max Mirnyi	7–5, 6–3

== ATP Challenger and ITF Futures finals ==
=== Singles: 4 (2–2) ===
Legend ATP Challenger (2–2) ITF Futures (0–0)	Finals by surface Hard (2–2) Clay (0–0) Grass (0–0) Carpet (0–0)

Result	W–L	Date	Tournament	Tier	Surface	Opponent	Score
Win	1–0	Aug 1989	New Haven, United States	Challenger	Hard	(United States) Buff Farrow	6–3, 6–4
Loss	1–1	Aug 1989	Winnetka, United States	Challenger	Hard	(United States) Brian Garrow	4–6, 2–6
Loss	1–2	Aug 1991	Winnetka, United States	Challenger	Hard	(Zimbabwe) Byron Black	4–6, 6–4, 2–6
Win	2–2	Sep 1997	Delray Beach, United States	Challenger	Hard	(Israel) Eyal Ran	6–2, 6–0

== Performance timelines ==
Key
W	F	SF	QF	#R	RR	Q#	DNQ	A	NH

(W) winner; (F) finalist; (SF) semifinalist; (QF) quarterfinalist; (#R) rounds 4, 3, 2, 1; (RR) round-robin stage; (Q#) qualification round; (DNQ) did not qualify; (A) absent; (NH) not held; (SR) strike rate (events won / competed); (W–L) win–loss record.

=== Singles ===
Tournament	1990	1991	1992	1993	1994	1995	1996	1997	1998	1999	2000	2001	2002	2003	2004	SR	W–L	Win %
Grand Slam tournaments
Australian Open	A	A	A	1R	F	4R	3R	A	2R	QF	2R	QF	3R	A	3R	0 / 10	25–10	71%
French Open	A	4R	A	1R	3R	3R	3R	A	1R	A	1R	1R	2R	2R	1R	0 / 11	11–11	50%
Wimbledon	A	Q1	2R	QF	SF	4R	SF	A	4R	QF	2R	4R	2R	3R	2R	0 / 12	33–12	73%
US Open	1R	3R	3R	3R	SF	4R	3R	2R	2R	F	SF	2R	1R	4R	1R	0 / 15	33–15	69%
Win–loss	0–1	5–2	3–2	6–4	18–4	11–4	11–4	1–1	5–4	14–3	7–4	8–4	4–4	6–3	3–4	0 / 48	102–48	68%
Year-end championships
Tennis Masters Cup	Did not qualify									RR	Did not qualify					0 / 1	1–2	33%
Grand Slam Cup	Did not qualify			1R	SF	F	Did not qualify				Not Held					0 / 3	5–3	63%
ATP Tour Masters 1000
Indian Wells Masters	A	A	A	3R	3R	QF	3R	A	2R	QF	A	A	SF	1R	1R	0 / 9	15–9	63%
Miami Open	A	A	A	2R	2R	2R	4R	A	3R	A	A	1R	2R	QF	4R	0 / 9	13–9	59%
Monte Carlo	A	A	A	A	A	A	1R	A	1R	A	A	A	A	A	A	0 / 2	0–2	0%
Rome	A	A	A	A	A	2R	3R	A	2R	A	1R	1R	A	A	1R	0 / 6	4–6	40%
Hamburg	A	A	A	A	A	A	A	A	A	A	2R	2R	1R	A	A	0 / 3	2–3	40%
Canada Masters	A	A	2R	F	2R	3R	SF	A	2R	QF	1R	3R	3R	Q1	A	0 / 10	18–10	64%
Cincinnati Masters	A	A	2R	1R	A	3R	2R	A	3R	2R	QF	2R	1R	3R	A	0 / 10	13–10	57%
Stockholm / Stuttgart	A	A	A	3R	3R	2R	3R	QF	3R	QF	A	A	A	A	A	0 / 7	11–7	61%
Paris Masters	A	A	A	3R	3R	3R	3R	1R	SF	2R	A	A	Q2	A	A	0 / 7	8–7	53%
Win–loss	0–0	0–0	2–2	10–6	3–5	9–7	12–8	3–2	13–8	8–5	4–4	4–5	7–5	6–3	3–3	0 / 63	84–63	57%
Year-end ranking	269	134	87	13	10	18	12	81	16	7	55	57	47	68	145	Career Earnings: $8,232,355		

=== Doubles ===
Tournament	1990	1991	1992	1993	1994	1995	1996	1997	1998	1999	2000	2001	2002	2003	2004	SR	W–L	Win %
Grand Slam tournaments
Australian Open	A	A	A	A	2R	A	A	A	A	A	A	A	A	A	A	0 / 1	1–1	50%
French Open	A	A	A	3R	A	A	A	A	A	A	A	A	A	A	1R	0 / 2	2–2	50%
Wimbledon	A	Q1	A	A	3R	A	A	A	2R	A	A	A	A	A	A	0 / 2	3–2	60%
US Open	2R	2R	2R	1R	A	1R	A	A	1R	A	A	A	A	A	A	0 / 6	3–6	33%
Win–loss	1–1	1–1	1–1	2–2	3–2	0–1	0–0	0–0	1–2	0–0	0–0	0–0	0–0	0–0	0–1	0 / 11	9–11	45%
ATP Tour Masters 1000
Indian Wells Masters	A	A	A	A	QF	A	2R	A	F	A	A	A	A	A	A	0 / 3	7–3	70%
Miami Open	A	A	A	2R	A	2R	2R	A	A	A	A	A	A	A	1R	0 / 4	2–4	33%
Monte Carlo	A	A	A	A	A	A	SF	A	A	A	A	A	A	A	A	0 / 1	2–1	67%
Rome	A	A	A	A	A	QF	2R	A	A	A	A	A	A	A	A	0 / 2	3–2	60%
Hamburg	A	A	A	A	A	A	A	A	A	A	A	1R	A	A	A	0 / 1	0–1	0%
Canada Masters	A	A	A	1R	1R	1R	A	A	2R	A	QF	A	1R	A	A	0 / 6	3–6	33%
Cincinnati Masters	A	A	A	A	A	2R	A	A	QF	A	Q1	2R	W	2R	A	1 / 5	10–4	71%
Stockholm / Stuttgart	A	A	A	A	A	A	A	1R	A	A	A	A	A	A	A	0 / 1	0–1	0%
Paris Masters	A	A	A	A	A	F	A	A	A	A	A	A	A	A	A	0 / 1	4–1	80%
Win–loss	0–0	0–0	0–0	1–2	2–2	8–5	4–4	0–1	7–3	0–0	2–1	1–2	5–1	1–1	0–1	1 / 24	31–23	57%

== Top 10 wins ==
Season	1990	1991	1992	1993	1994	1995	1996	1997	1998	1999	2000	2001	2002	2003	2004	Total
Wins	0	0	0	5	5	3	3	1	5	4	1	2	4	1	0	34

#	Player	Rank	Event	Surface	Rd	Score	MR
1993
1.	(United States) Andre Agassi	8	Memphis, United States	Hard (i)	QF	6–1, 7–6^{(7–4)}	96
2.	(United States) Michael Chang	7	Memphis, United States	Hard (i)	SF	7–6^{(7–4)}, 6–4	96
3.	(Croatia) Goran Ivanišević	6	Wimbledon, United Kingdom	Grass	3R	2–6, 7–6^{(7–3)}, 6–7^{(4–7)}, 7–5, 6–0	30
4.	(Germany) Boris Becker	4	Montreal, Canada	Hard	3R	7–5, 7–6^{(7–3)}	20
5.	(Sweden) Stefan Edberg	6	Tokyo, Japan	Carpet (i)	QF	6–4, 6–4	16
1994
6.	(Sweden) Stefan Edberg	4	Australian Open, Melbourne	Hard	SF	3–6, 7–6^{(9–7)}, 7–6^{(9–7)}, 7–6^{(7–4)}	12
7.	(Sweden) Stefan Edberg	3	Queen's Club, United Kingdom	Grass	QF	6–3, 6–4	9
8.	(United States) Pete Sampras	1	Queen's Club, United Kingdom	Grass	F	7–6^{(7–4)}, 7–6^{(7–4)}	9
9.	(Sweden) Stefan Edberg	5	Davis Cup, Gothenburg, Sweden	Carpet (i)	RR	6–2, 2–6, 6–4, 6–3	6
10.	(Spain) Sergi Bruguera	4	Grand Slam Cup, Munich	Carpet (i)	QF	6–4, 7–6^{(7–5)}	10
1995
11.	(United States) Pete Sampras	1	Memphis, United States	Hard (i)	SF	4–6, 7–6^{(8–6)}, 6–4	16
12.	(Sweden) Thomas Enqvist	8	Davis Cup, Las Vegas	Hard	RR	7–5, 7–5, 7–6^{(7–2)}	19
13.	(Germany) Boris Becker	4	Grand Slam Cup, Munich	Carpet (i)	SF	5–7, 6–3, 6–4, 7–6^{(7–4)}	18
1996
14.	(Croatia) Goran Ivanišević	10	Sydney, Australia	Hard	F	5–7, 6–3, 6–4	17
15.	(Sweden) Thomas Enqvist	6	Memphis, United States	Hard (i)	QF	6–4, 6–4	22
16.	(Croatia) Goran Ivanišević	5	Vienna, Austria	Carpet (i)	QF	4–6, 6–3, 6–3	13
1997
17.	(Spain) Carlos Moyá	7	Stuttgart, Germany	Carpet (i)	2R	6–3, 7–6^{(7–2)}	64
1998
18.	(Czech Republic) Petr Korda	5	Vienna, Austria	Carpet (i)	2R	6–3, 7–6^{(7–2)}	29
19.	(Slovakia) Karol Kučera	7	Stuttgart, Germany	Hard (i)	2R	6–2, 6–4	28
20.	(Australia) Patrick Rafter	3	Paris, France	Carpet (i)	3R	5–7, 7–6^{(7–5)}, 7–6^{(8–6)}	26
21.	(United States) Andre Agassi	5	Paris, France	Carpet (i)	QF	4–6, 6–4, 6–4	26
22.	(United Kingdom) Tim Henman	10	Stockholm, Sweden	Hard (i)	SF	4–6, 6–1, 6–2	21
1999
23.	(Spain) Àlex Corretja	3	Sydney, Australia	Hard	F	6–3, 7–6^{(7–5)}	16
24.	(Chile) Marcelo Ríos	6	Indian Wells, United States	Hard	3R	4–6, 6–2, 6–2	11
25.	(United Kingdom) Greg Rusedski	8	US Open, New York	Hard	4R	5–7, 0–6, 7–6^{(7–3)}, 6–4, 6–4	7
26.	(Sweden) Thomas Enqvist	4	ATP Tour World Championships, Hanover	Hard (i)	RR	6–4, 6–1	7
2000
27.	(France) Cédric Pioline	10	US Open, New York	Hard	3R	7–6^{(7–5)}, 6–3, 6–2	32
2001
28.	(United States) Pete Sampras	3	Australian Open, Melbourne	Hard	4R	6–7^{(2–7)}, 6–3, 6–4, 6–4	54
29.	(Russia) Yevgeny Kafelnikov	6	Montreal, Canada	Hard	1R	3–6, 7–6^{(7–3)}, 6–4	33
2002
30.	(United States) Pete Sampras	10	Adelaide, Australia	Hard	1R	3–6, 6–3, 6–4	57
31.	(Germany) Tommy Haas	6	Indian Wells, United States	Hard	2R	6–4, 6–2	64
32.	(Russia) Yevgeny Kafelnikov	3	Indian Wells, United States	Hard	QF	7–6^{(7–5)}, 6–3	64
33.	(Sweden) Thomas Johansson	9	Toronto, Canada	Hard	2R	7–6^{(7–5)}, 6–3	47
2003
34.	(United States) Andy Roddick	6	Miami, United States	Hard	3R	7–6^{(7–3)}, 6–4	114

== Post-playing ==
Martin participates on the Outback Champions Series tennis event for the former members of the ATP tour.^{[1]} Martin finished 2006 ranked third and 2007 ranked first in the Outback Series.

=== Senior tour titles ===
- 2006: Champions Cup Boston – defeated John McEnroe 6–3, 4–6, [10–8]
- 2007: Gibson Guitars Champions Cup – defeated McEnroe 7–5, 7–5
- 2008: The Oliver Group Champions Cup – defeated McEnroe 6–3, 6–1

=== Coaching ===
After his playing career, Martin coached Mardy Fish, World #18 from 2004-2007 then Novak Djokovic from 2009-2010. Martin credits his own development to coaches Rick Ferman, youth coach and mentor; Jose Higueras, coach and teacher throughout professional career; and Dean Goldfine who coached Martin for seven years.

In 1993, he founded Todd Martin Youth Leadership, in his hometown of Lansing, Michigan that serves at risk youth and provides tennis, education and leadership programming to over 10,000 children to date. He continues to volunteer his time and visits when able.

=== CEO, International Tennis Hall of Fame ===
The ITHF stewards the history of tennis, honors the players and contributors to the sport of tennis. As CEO, Martin drives globalization, leading all elements of the 501c3 nonprofit business, strategic planning, revenue generation, and ambassadorial duties. He is responsible for the day-to-day operations of the seven-acre national historic landmark including an American Alliance of Museums accredited museum, a 20 court public tennis facility, an ATP Tour professional tournament, and enshrinement process.

=== Volunteer service ===
Martin's foray into leadership came as president of the ATP Player's Council. Elected by the players, Martin served as the primary player advisor to ATP player relations, executive leadership and board of directors. He was the media spokesperson for all ATP Tour players' affairs and led meetings of the player council and general player body. Martin volunteered his time for the board of directors of the USTA (post-playing career) for more than a decade.

Martin serves on the board of directors for the Tennis Industry Association, and he is on the Oracle US Tennis Awards advisory council.

After his playing career, he did public speaking for corporations and organizations such as Mayo Clinic - Jacksonville, USTA and ITA. He was a booth and studio analyst for various television, radio and web broadcasters to include CBS Sports Net, ESPN.com, and Tennis Channel. Martin wrote several publications for USA Today and Tennis Magazine. He participated and consulted for a variety of events for charities, schools and corporations to include Goldman Sachs, Wells Fargo, and Fidelity Investments.

He remains as board director of the Tennis Industry Association and is a member of advisory staff for RacquetFit.

=== Honors and awards ===
Martin has been inducted into several Halls of Fame including those of Northwestern University (2001), Greater Lansing Sports (2002), Intercollegiate Tennis Association (2007), and the USTA Midwest (2008).

Martin was the recipient of the ATP's Most Improved Player Award (1993), ATP Sportsmanship Award (1993, 1994) and the International Club’s prestigious Jean Borotra Sportsmanship Award (2002) and the ATP World Team Cup Fair Play Award (2003).

=== Family ===
Martin married his wife in December 2000. Together, the pair have three children, Jack, Cash & Gwen.

Awards
Preceded by Henrik Holm	ATP Most Improved Player; 1993	Succeeded by Yevgeny Kafelnikov
