= 1995 Paris Open – Singles =

Singles
- 1995 Paris Open

Final
- Champion: (United States) Pete Sampras
- Runner-up: (Germany) Boris Becker
- Score: 7–6^{(7–5)}, 6–4, 6–4

Details
- Draw: 48 (6 Q / 4 WC)
- Seeds: 16

Events
Singles	Doubles
- Paris Masters

Pete Sampras defeated Boris Becker in the final, 7–6^{(7–5)}, 6–4, 6–4 to win the singles tennis title at the 1995 Paris Open.

Andre Agassi was the reigning champion, but did not participate this year.

== Seeds ==
All sixteen seeds receive a bye into the second round.

1. (United States) Pete Sampras (champion)
2. (Austria) Thomas Muster (second round)
3. (Germany) Boris Becker (finalist)
4. (United States) Michael Chang (quarterfinals)
5. (Croatia) Goran Ivanišević (second round)
6. (United States) Jim Courier (semifinals)
7. (Sweden) Thomas Enqvist (second round)
8. (Spain) Sergi Bruguera (third round)
9. (South Africa) Wayne Ferreira (semifinals)
10. (Switzerland) Marc Rosset (third round)
11. (Sweden) Magnus Larsson (third round)
12. (Netherlands) Richard Krajicek (quarterfinals)
13. (Ukraine) Andrei Medvedev (third round)
14. (United States) Todd Martin (third round)
15. (Italy) Andrea Gaudenzi (second round)
16. (Netherlands) Jan Siemerink (third round)

== Draw ==
Key

- Q = Qualifier
- WC = Wild card
- LL = Lucky loser
- Alt = Alternate
- ITF = ITF entry
- PR = Protected ranking
- SR = Special ranking
- SE = Special exempt
- JE = Junior exempt
- JR = Junior Accelerator Programme entrant
- CO = College Accelerator Programme entrant
- NG = Next Gen Accelerator Program entrant
- w/o = Walkover
- r = Retired
- d = Defaulted

=== Finals ===
Quarterfinals
1	(United States) Pete Sampras	6	6
(Switzerland) Jakob Hlasek	2	3
4	(United States) Michael Chang	2	6^{5}
6	(United States) Jim Courier	6	7^{7}
12	(Netherlands) Richard Krajicek	6	6^{5}	4
3	(Germany) Boris Becker	4	7^{7}	6
9	(South Africa) Wayne Ferreira	6	6
(Czech Republic) Daniel Vacek	2	4

Semifinals
1	(United States) Pete Sampras	6	3	6
6	(United States) Jim Courier	4	6	3
3	(Germany) Boris Becker	6	6
9	(South Africa) Wayne Ferreira	2	1

Final
1	(United States) Pete Sampras	7^{7}	6	6
3	(Germany) Boris Becker	6^{5}	4	4

=== Section 1 ===
First round
(Sweden) J Björkman	2	6^{3}
(France) A Boetsch	6	7^{7}
(United States) D Wheaton	6	6
(Italy) R Furlan	2	3
Q	(Uzbekistan) O Ogorodov	4	3
WC	(France) G Raoux	6	6
(Switzerland) J Hlasek	6	6
(Germany) B Karbacher	1	3

Second round
1	(United States) P Sampras	6	6
(France) A Boetsch	3	4
(United States) D Wheaton	6^{6}	6^{4}
16	(Netherlands) J Siemerink	7^{8}	7^{7}
10	(Switzerland) M Rosset	6	6
WC	(France) G Raoux	4	2
(Switzerland) J Hlasek	7^{7}	6
7	(Sweden) T Enqvist	6^{3}	3

Third round
1	(United States) P Sampras	6	6
16	(Netherlands) J Siemerink	3	4
10	(Switzerland) M Rosset	6	6^{1}	6^{3}
(Switzerland) J Hlasek	2	7^{7}	7^{7}

Quarterfinals
1	(United States) P Sampras	6	6
(Switzerland) J Hlasek	2	3

=== Section 2 ===
First round
(Zimbabwe) B Black	7^{7}	6
Q	(Romania) A Pavel	6^{4}	3
(Australia) T Woodbridge	6	4	2
(United States) M Washington	4	6	6
(Australia) M Woodforde	6	6
Q	(United States) J Grabb	1	3
(New Zealand) B Steven	4	6	6^{2}
(Netherlands) J Eltingh	6	3	7^{7}

Second round
4	(United States) M Chang	4	6	6
(Zimbabwe) B Black	6	3	3
(United States) M Washington	4	4
13	(Ukraine) A Medvedev	6	6
11	(Sweden) M Larsson	4	7^{10}	6
(Australia) M Woodforde	6	6^{8}	0
(Netherlands) J Eltingh	1	7^{7}	2
6	(United States) J Courier	6	6^{2}	6

Third round
4	(United States) M Chang	2	6	7
13	(Ukraine) A Medvedev	6	3	5
11	(Sweden) M Larsson	3	4
6	(United States) J Courier	6	6

Quarterfinals
4	(United States) M Chang	2	6^{5}
6	(United States) J Courier	6	7^{7}

=== Section 3 ===
First round
(Netherlands) P Haarhuis	6	2	6
(Romania) A Voinea	3	6	3
(France) C Pioline	6	6
(Sweden) M Gustafsson	2	4
WC	(France) L Roux	2	6	3
Q	(Netherlands) HJ Davids	6	3	6
Q	(France) D Courcol	6	3	3
(Russia) A Volkov	4	6	6

Second round
5	(Croatia) G Ivanišević	3	6	4
(Netherlands) P Haarhuis	6	4	6
(France) C Pioline	6	4	5
12	(Netherlands) R Krajicek	4	6	7
14	(United States) T Martin	6	6
Q	(Netherlands) HJ Davids	3	4
(Russia) A Volkov	6	3	4
3	(Germany) B Becker	3	6	6

Third round
(Netherlands) P Haarhuis	4	2
12	(Netherlands) R Krajicek	6	6
14	(United States) T Martin	4	6	5
3	(Germany) B Becker	6	4	7

Quarterfinals
12	(Netherlands) R Krajicek	6	6^{5}	4
3	(Germany) B Becker	4	7^{7}	6

=== Section 4 ===
First round
WC	(France) H Leconte	7	6
(United States) A Krickstein	5	3
(Germany) M Sinner	2	5
Q	(United States) R Reneberg	6	7
(Czech Republic) D Vacek	6^{3}	6	6
(United States) P McEnroe	7^{7}	4	1
WC	(France) J Golmard	7^{7}	4	1
(France) G Forget	6^{5}	6	6

Second round
8	(Spain) S Bruguera	6	4	6
WC	(France) H Leconte	4	6	2
Q	(United States) R Reneberg	2	7	4
9	(South Africa) W Ferreira	6	5	6
15	(Czech Republic) A Gaudenzi	4	3
(Czech Republic) D Vacek	6	6
(France) G Forget	6	7^{7}
2	(Austria) T Muster	3	6^{4}

Third round
8	(Spain) S Bruguera	2	6	6^{3}
9	(South Africa) W Ferreira	6	3	7^{7}
(Czech Republic) D Vacek	5
(France) G Forget	2	r

Quarterfinals
9	(South Africa) W Ferreira	6	6
(Czech Republic) D Vacek	2	4

== Qualifying ==
=== Qualifying seeds ===
1. (Japan) Shuzo Matsuoka (first round)
2. (Australia) Jason Stoltenberg (qualifying competition)
3. (United States) Richey Reneberg (qualified)
4. (Australia) Richard Fromberg (second round, retired)
5. (United States) Jared Palmer (first round)
6. (United States) Jeff Tarango (second round)
7. (Australia) Michael Tebbutt (first round)
8. (United States) Jonathan Stark (first round)
9. (Belgium) Kris Goossens (first round)
10. (Morocco) Younes El Aynaoui (first round)
11. (Uzbekistan) Oleg Ogorodov (qualified)
12. (Italy) Gianluca Pozzi (first round)

=== Qualifiers ===
1. (United States) Jim Grabb
2. (Uzbekistan) Oleg Ogorodov
3. (United States) Richey Reneberg
4. (Netherlands) Hendrik Jan Davids
5. (Romania) Andrei Pavel
6. (France) Daniel Courcol

=== Qualifying draw ===
==== First qualifier ====
First round
1	(Japan) Shuzo Matsuoka	3	4
(United States) Jim Grabb	6	6
(France) Thierry Guardiola	7	5	3
(Australia) Sandon Stolle	6	7	6
(United States) Alex O'Brien	7	1	6
(France) Régis Lavergne	6	6	1
(United States) Luke Jensen	7	6
11	(Italy) Gianluca Pozzi	6	2

Second round
(United States) Jim Grabb	7	4	7
(Australia) Sandon Stolle	6	6	5
(United States) Alex O'Brien	6	6
(United States) Luke Jensen	3	3

Qualifying competition
(United States) Jim Grabb	6	6
(United States) Alex O'Brien	4	0

==== Second qualifier ====
First round
2	(Australia) Jason Stoltenberg	6	4	7
(South Africa) Neville Godwin	3	6	5
(France) Pier Gauthier	4	6	2
(France) Philippe Pech	6	3	6
(South Africa) David Adams	6	6
(North Macedonia) Aleksandar Kitinov	4	4
(Soviet Union) Ģirts Dzelde
12	(Uzbekistan) Oleg Ogorodov	w/o

Second round
2	(Australia) Jason Stoltenberg	3	6	6
(France) Philippe Pech	6	1	4
(South Africa) David Adams	1	4
12	(Uzbekistan) Oleg Ogorodov	6	6

Qualifying competition
2	(Australia) Jason Stoltenberg	3	6
12	(Uzbekistan) Oleg Ogorodov	6	7

==== Third qualifier ====
First round
3	(United States) Richey Reneberg	3	5
(United States) Richard Matuszewski	6	1^{r}
(France) Gérard Solvès	7	6
(France) Thierry Champion	5	2
(Zimbabwe) Wayne Black	6	6
(France) Olivier Morel	4	2
(United States) Tommy Ho	6	6
10	(Morocco) Younes El Aynaoui	3	4

Second round
3	(United States) Richey Reneberg	6	7
(France) Gérard Solvès	2	5
(Zimbabwe) Wayne Black	4	5
(United States) Tommy Ho	6	7

Qualifying competition
3	(United States) Richey Reneberg	6	6
(United States) Tommy Ho	1	0

==== Fourth qualifier ====
First round
4	(Australia) Richard Fromberg	4	6	7
(Canada) Daniel Nestor	6	3	6
(France) Jérôme Hanquez	4	6	3
(Netherlands) Hendrik Jan Davids	6	1	6
(Sweden) Mikael Stadling	6	2	6
(France) Olivier Soules	2	6	3
(France) Rodolphe Gilbert	5	6	6
9	(Belgium) Kris Goossens	7	3	3

Second round
4	(Australia) Richard Fromberg	3	0^{r}
(Netherlands) Hendrik Jan Davids	6	3
(Sweden) Mikael Stadling	7	7
(France) Rodolphe Gilbert	6	6

Qualifying competition
(Netherlands) Hendrik Jan Davids	7	6
(Sweden) Mikael Stadling	6	1

==== Fifth qualifier ====
First round
5	(United States) Jared Palmer	7	5	4
(France) Maxime Huard	6	7	6
(Russia) Andrei Cherkasov	3	6	7
(Morocco) Hicham Arazi	6	2	5
(France) Jérôme Loustalot	7	5	1
(Romania) Andrei Pavel	6	7	6
(United States) Steve Bryan	7	6
8	(United States) Jonathan Stark	5	2

Second round
(France) Maxime Huard	2	6	3
(Russia) Andrei Cherkasov	6	3	6
(Romania) Andrei Pavel	7	6
(United States) Steve Bryan	6	1

Qualifying competition
(Russia) Andrei Cherkasov	5	1
(Romania) Andrei Pavel	7	6

==== Sixth qualifier ====
First round
6	(United States) Jeff Tarango	6	6
(Spain) Álex Calatrava	3	2
(Venezuela) Maurice Ruah	6	6
(France) Gilles Bastié	4	4
(The Bahamas) Mark Knowles	6	6
(France) Frédéric Fontang	3	1
(France) Daniel Courcol	7	7
7	(Australia) Michael Tebbutt	6	5

Second round
6	(United States) Jeff Tarango	6	5	1
(Venezuela) Maurice Ruah	4	7	6
(The Bahamas) Mark Knowles	3	7	3
(France) Daniel Courcol	6	5	6

Qualifying competition
(Venezuela) Maurice Ruah	2	4
(France) Daniel Courcol	6	6
