= Stéphane Andriolo =

French tennis player

- Country (sports): France
- Born: 6 November 1971 (age 53)

Singles
- Career record: 0–1
- Highest ranking: No. 341 (25 Apr 1994)

Grand Slam singles results
- Australian Open: Q1 (1994)

Stéphane Andriolo (born 6 November 1971) is a French former professional tennis player.

Active on tour in the 1990s, Andriolo reached a best singles world ranking of 341. In 1994 he made his only career ATP Tour main draw appearance at the Indonesian Open in Jakarta and featured in the Australian Open qualifiers.
