= 1995 Paris Open – Doubles =

Doubles
- 1995 Paris Open

Final
- Champions: (Canada) Grant Connell; (United States) Patrick Galbraith
- Runners-up: (United States) Jim Grabb; (United States) Todd Martin
- Score: 6–2, 6–2

Details
- Draw: 24
- Seeds: 8

Events
Singles	Doubles
- Paris Open

Jacco Eltingh and Paul Haarhuis were the defending champions, but lost in the quarterfinals this year.

Grant Connell and Patrick Galbraith won in the final 6–2, 6–2, against Jim Grabb and Todd Martin.

== Seeds ==
All seeds receive a bye into the second round.

1. (Australia) Todd Woodbridge / (Australia) Mark Woodforde (semifinals)
2. (Netherlands) Jacco Eltingh / (Netherlands) Paul Haarhuis (quarterfinals)
3. (Canada) Grant Connell / (United States) Patrick Galbraith (champions)
4. (The Bahamas) Mark Knowles / (Canada) Daniel Nestor (quarterfinals)
5. (Czech Republic) Cyril Suk / (Czech Republic) Daniel Vacek (second round)
6. (Zimbabwe) Byron Black / (United States) Jonathan Stark (second round)
7. (United States) Rick Leach / (United States) Scott Melville (second round)
8. (Switzerland) Jakob Hlasek / (United States) Patrick McEnroe (quarterfinals)

== Draw ==
Key

- Q = Qualifier
- WC = Wild card
- LL = Lucky loser
- Alt = Alternate
- ITF = ITF entry
- PR = Protected ranking
- SR = Special ranking
- SE = Special exempt
- JE = Junior exempt
- JR = Junior Accelerator Programme entrant
- CO = College Accelerator Programme entrant
- NG = Next Gen Accelerator Program entrant
- w/o = Walkover
- r = Retired
- d = Defaulted

=== Finals ===
Semifinals

Final

1
- (Australia) Todd Woodbridge
- (Australia) Mark Woodforde
2
3

3
- (Canada) Grant Connell
- (United States) Patrick Galbraith
6
6

3
- (Canada) Grant Connell
- (United States) Patrick Galbraith
6
6

- (United States) Jim Grabb
- (United States) Todd Martin
2
2

- (United States) Jim Grabb
- (United States) Todd Martin
6
6
7

WC
- (France) Rodolphe Gilbert
- (France) Guillaume Raoux
3
7
6

=== Top half ===
First round

Second round

Quarterfinals

Semifinals

1
- (Australia) T Woodbridge
- (Australia) M Woodforde
6
3
6

Q
- (Uzbekistan) O Ogorodov
- (Venezuela) M Ruah
4
4

- (United States) L Jensen
- (United States) J Tarango
3
6
2

- (United States) L Jensen
- (United States) J Tarango
6
6

1
- (Australia) T Woodbridge
- (Australia) M Woodforde
4
6
7

LL
- (Zimbabwe) W Black
- (Australia) M Tebbutt
4
6
2

8
- (Switzerland) J Hlasek
- (United States) P McEnroe
6
4
5

- (Japan) T Ho
- (New Zealand) B Steven
6
3
6

- (Japan) T Ho
- (New Zealand) B Steven
4
4

8
- (Switzerland) J Hlasek
- (United States) P McEnroe
6
6

1
- (Australia) T Woodbridge
- (Australia) M Woodforde
2
3

3
- (Canada) G Connell
- (United States) P Galbraith
6
6

3
- (Canada) G Connell
- (United States) P Galbraith
w/o

WC
- (France) G Forget
- (France) H Leconte
6
7

WC
- (France) G Forget
- (France) H Leconte

- (United States) J Palmer
- (United States) R Reneberg
2
5

3
- (Canada) G Connell
- (United States) P Galbraith
6
6

- (South Africa) D Adams
- (Belgium) L Pimek
4
7
6

- (South Africa) D Adams
- (Belgium) L Pimek
2
4

WC
- (Italy) A Gaudenzi
- (Croatia) G Ivanišević
6
6
2

- (South Africa) D Adams
- (Belgium) L Pimek
5
7
6

5
- (Czech Republic) C Suk
- (Czech Republic) D Vacek
7
6
3

=== Bottom half ===
First round

Second round

Quarterfinals

Semifinals

6
- (Zimbabwe) B Black
- (United States) J Stark
4
6
3

- (Netherlands) H Jan Davids
- (South Africa) P Norval
3
6
4

- (United States) J Grabb
- (United States) T Martin
6
3
6

- (United States) J Grabb
- (United States) T Martin
6
2
6

- (United States) J Grabb
- (United States) T Martin
6
6
6

- (United States) M Keil
- (Sweden) P Nyborg
3
1

4
- (The Bahamas) M Knowles
- (Canada) D Nestor
4
7
3

- (Sweden) J Björkman
- (South Africa) J-L de Jager
6
6

- (Sweden) J Björkman
- (South Africa) J-L de Jager
7
4
5

4
- (The Bahamas) M Knowles
- (Canada) D Nestor
6
6
7

- (United States) J Grabb
- (United States) T Martin
6
6
7

WC
- (France) R Gilbert
- (France) G Raoux
3
7
6

7
- (United States) R Leach
- (United States) S Melville
3
6

- (United States) A O'Brien
- (Australia) S Stolle
6
4
6

WC
- (France) R Gilbert
- (France) G Raoux
6
7

WC
- (France) R Gilbert
- (France) G Raoux
0
6
7

WC
- (France) R Gilbert
- (France) G Raoux
2
6
6

- (United States) T Kronemann
- (Australia) D Macpherson
6
3
6

2
- (Netherlands) J Eltingh
- (Netherlands) P Haarhuis
6
3
3

- (Netherlands) M Oosting
- (Netherlands) J Siemerink
3
6
3

- (United States) T Kronemann
- (Australia) D Macpherson
7
6
5

2
- (Netherlands) J Eltingh
- (Netherlands) P Haarhuis
6
7
7
