= Lionel Roux =

French tennis player (born 1973)

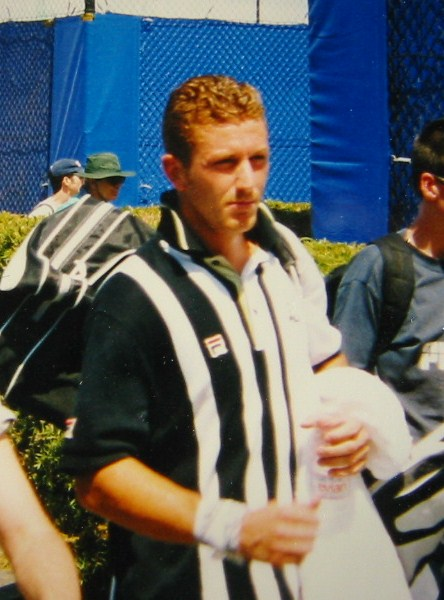
- Country (sports): France
- Residence: Jupiter, Florida, USA
- Born: 12 April 1973 (age 51); Lyon, France
- Height: 1.85 m (6 ft 1 in)
- Turned pro: 1991
- Retired: 2003
- Plays: Right-handed (two-handed backhand)
- Prize money: $1,255,648

Singles
- Career record: 76–117
- Career titles: 0
- Highest ranking: No. 48 (13 March 1995)

Grand Slam singles results
- Australian Open: 4R (1998)
- French Open: 3R (1999)
- Wimbledon: 1R (1995, 1997)
- US Open: 3R (1997)

Doubles
- Career record: 5–20
- Career titles: 0
- Highest ranking: No. 246 (10 June 1996)

Grand Slam doubles results
- French Open: 1R (1993, 1994, 1995, 1996)

Lionel Roux (French: [ljɔnɛl ʁu]; born 12 April 1973) is a former tennis player from France, who turned professional in 1991. He was French National Junior champion in 1991, but didn't win a tour-level title (singles or doubles) during his pro career. The right-hander reached his career-high singles ranking on the ATP Tour on 13 March 1995, when he became world No. 48. His best slam performance was reaching the 4th round of the 1998 Australian Open. He played two ATP finals, both in Asia.

Roux has also made an appearance in the 2001 French comedy La Tour Montparnasse Infernale.
