= 1997 MFS Pro Tennis Championships – Doubles =

Doubles
- 1997 MFS Pro Tennis Championships

Final
- Champions: (Netherlands) Jacco Eltingh (Netherlands) Paul Haarhuis
- Runners-up: (United States) Dave Randall (United States) Jack Waite
- Score: 6–4, 6–2

Details
- Draw: 16 (2WC/1Q/1LL)
- Seeds: 4

Events
Singles	Doubles
← 1989 ·	U.S. Pro Tennis Championships	· 1998 →

As the U.S. Pro Tennis Championships was an exhibition tournament during the early 1990s, no doubles tournaments were played at that time. The last edition was played in 1989, and was won by Andrés Gómez and Alberto Mancini. Both players retired from professional tennis in 1993 and 1994, respectively.

Jacco Eltingh and Paul Haarhuis won the title by defeating Dave Randall and Jack Waite 6–4, 6–2 in the final.

== Seeds ==
1. (Netherlands) Jacco Eltingh / (Netherlands) Paul Haarhuis (champions)
2. (Argentina) Pablo Albano / (Spain) Àlex Corretja (first round)
3. (South Africa) David Adams / (South Africa) Marius Barnard (first round)
4. (United States) Dave Randall / (United States) Jack Waite (final)

== Draw ==
=== Key ===
- Q = Qualifier
- WC = Wild card
- LL = Lucky loser
- Alt = Alternate
- SE = Special exempt
- PR = Protected ranking
- ITF = ITF entry
- JE = Junior exempt
- w/o = Walkover
- r = Retired
- d = Defaulted
- SR = Special ranking

=== Draw ===
First round
1	(Netherlands) J Eltingh (Netherlands) P Haarhuis	6	6
WC	(Denmark) K Carlsen (United States) P McEnroe	4	1
(Spain) A Berasategui (United States) D Bowen	6	6
(United States) B Coupe (Mexico) D Roditi	2	1
3	(South Africa) D Adams (South Africa) M Barnard	4	7	1
(Hungary) G Köves (Czech Republic) J Novák	6	5	6
Q	(Belgium) F Dewulf (Belgium) J Van Herck	3	2
(United States) D DiLucia (Federal Republic of Yugoslavia) N Đorđević	6	6
(Brazil) F Meligeni (Netherlands) S Schalken	4	5
(United States) K Jones (Sweden) M Tillström	6	7
LL	(Argentina) D Furmanski (Puerto Rico) J Frontera	1	3
4	(United States) D Randall (United States) J Waite	6	6
WC	(Sweden) M Norman (Netherlands) D van Scheppingen	6	3	6
(France) G Raoux (United States) J Tarango	4	6	4
(Czech Republic) S Doseděl (Slovakia) D Hrbatý	6	7
2	(Argentina) P Albano (Spain) À Corretja	3	6

Quarterfinals
1	(Netherlands) J Eltingh (Netherlands) P Haarhuis	6	6
(Spain) A Berasategui (United States) D Bowen	3	3
(Hungary) G Köves (Czech Republic) J Novák	7	6
(United States) D DiLucia (Federal Republic of Yugoslavia) N Đorđević	6	2
(United States) K Jones (Sweden) M Tillström	3	6
4	(United States) D Randall (United States) J Waite	6	7
WC	(Sweden) M Norman (Netherlands) D van Scheppingen	6	2
(Czech Republic) S Doseděl (Slovakia) D Hrbatý	7	6

Semifinals
1	(Netherlands) J Eltingh (Netherlands) P Haarhuis	7	3	6
(Hungary) G Köves (Czech Republic) J Novák	6	6	3
4	(United States) D Randall (United States) J Waite	6	6
(Czech Republic) S Doseděl (Slovakia) D Hrbatý	4	2

Final
1	(Netherlands) J Eltingh (Netherlands) P Haarhuis	6	6
4	(United States) D Randall (United States) J Waite	4	2
