= 1997 MFS Pro Tennis Championships =

- Date: August 18–24
- Edition: 69th
- Category: World Series
- Draw: 32S / 16D
- Prize money: $303,000
- Surface: Hard / outdoor
- Location: Boston, U.S.
- Venue: Longwood Cricket Club

Champions

Singles
- (Netherlands) Sjeng Schalken

Doubles
- (Netherlands) Jacco Eltingh / (Netherlands) Paul Haarhuis
← 1995 ·	U.S. Pro Tennis Championships	· 1998 →

The 1997 MFS Pro Tennis Championships, also known as the U.S. Pro Tennis Championships was a men's tennis tournament played on outdoor hard courts at the Longwood Cricket Club in Boston, Massachusetts, United States. The event was part of the World Series of the 1997 ATP Tour. It was the 69th edition of the tournament and was held from August 18 through August 24, 1997. Unseeded Sjeng Schalken won the singles title.

== Finals ==
=== Singles ===
(Netherlands) Sjeng Schalken defeated (Chile) Marcelo Ríos 7–5, 6–3

- It was Schalken's 1st singles title of the year and the 3rd of his career.

=== Doubles ===
(Netherlands) Jacco Eltingh / (Netherlands) Paul Haarhuis defeated (United States) Dave Randall / (United States) Jack Waite 6–4, 6–2
