= 1999 MFS Pro Tennis Championships – Doubles =

Doubles
- 1999 MFS Pro Tennis Championships

Final
- Champions: (Argentina) Guillermo Cañas (Argentina) Martín García
- Runners-up: (South Africa) Marius Barnard (United States) T. J. Middleton
- Score: 5–7, 7–6^{(7–2)}, 6–3

Details
- Draw: 16 (3WC/1Q)
- Seeds: 4

Events
| Singles | Doubles |
| ← 1998 · | U.S. Pro Tennis Championships |

Jacco Eltingh and Paul Haarhuis were the defending champions, but Eltingh did not compete this year. Haarhuis teamed up with Sjeng Schalken and lost in the quarterfinals to Guillermo Cañas and Martín García.

Cañas and García won the title by defeating Marius Barnard and T. J. Middleton 5–7, 7–6^{(7–2)}, 6–3 in the final.

== Seeds ==
1. (Argentina) Pablo Albano / (South Africa) Lan Bale (first round)
2. (Netherlands) Paul Haarhuis / (Netherlands) Sjeng Schalken (quarterfinals)
3. (South Africa) Marius Barnard / (United States) T. J. Middleton (final)
4. (United States) Devin Bowen / (United States) Adam Peterson (semifinals)

== Draw ==
=== Key ===
- Q = Qualifier
- WC = Wild card
- LL = Lucky loser
- Alt = Alternate
- SE = Special exempt
- PR = Protected ranking
- ITF = ITF entry
- JE = Junior exempt
- w/o = Walkover
- r = Retired
- d = Defaulted
- SR = Special ranking

=== Draw ===
First round
1 | (Argentina) P Albano (South Africa) L Bale | 6 | 0 | 5
WC | (United States) J Blake (Philippines) C Mamiit | 4 | 6 | 7
Q | (Lebanon) A Hamadeh (Armenia) S Sargsian | 4 | 6 | 6^{4}
(Romania) A Pavel (Belgium) T Vanhoudt | 6 | 4 | 7^{7}
3 | (South Africa) M Barnard (United States) TJ Middleton | 6 | 6
(United States) M Sprengelmeyer (South Africa) J Weir-Smith | 4 | 3
WC | (Australia) P Kilderry (France) G Raoux | 6 | 3 | 6
(United States) D DiLucia (United States) M Keil | 4 | 6 | 2
(United States) D Flach (Canada) B Kokavec | 5 | 7^{9} | 6
(Japan) T Shimada (South Africa) M Wakefield | 7 | 6^{7} | 3
WC | (Slovakia) J Krošlák (Russia) M Safin | 3 | 4
4 | (United States) D Bowen (United States) A Peterson | 6 | 6
(Argentina) M Rodríguez (Spain) A Martín | 2 | 2
(Argentina) G Cañas (Argentina) M García | 6 | 6
(Czech Republic) T Cibulec (Netherlands) S Groen | 3 | 4
2 | (Netherlands) P Haarhuis (Netherlands) S Schalken | 6 | 6

Quarterfinals
WC | (United States) J Blake (Philippines) C Mamiit | 2 | 4
(Romania) A Pavel (Belgium) T Vanhoudt | 6 | 6
3 | (South Africa) M Barnard (United States) TJ Middleton | 6^{3} | 6 | 7^{9}
WC | (Australia) P Kilderry (France) G Raoux | 7^{7} | 2 | 6^{7}
(United States) D Flach (Canada) B Kokavec | 3 | 2
4 | (United States) D Bowen (United States) A Peterson | 6 | 6
(Argentina) G Cañas (Argentina) M García | 7^{8} | 7^{10}
2 | (Netherlands) P Haarhuis (Netherlands) S Schalken | 6^{6} | 6^{8}

Semifinals
(Romania) A Pavel (Belgium) T Vanhoudt | 3 | 5
3 | (South Africa) M Barnard (United States) TJ Middleton | 6 | 7
4 | (United States) D Bowen (United States) A Peterson | 4 | 6^{4}
(Argentina) G Cañas (Argentina) M García | 6 | 7^{7}

Final
3 | (South Africa) M Barnard (United States) TJ Middleton | 7 | 6^{2} | 3
(Argentina) G Cañas (Argentina) M García | 5 | 7^{7} | 6
