= 1997 Paris Open =

- Date: 27 October – 2 November
- Edition: 25th
- Category: ATP Super 9
- Draw: 48S / 24D
- Prize money: $2,300,000
- Surface: Carpet / indoors
- Location: Paris, France
- Venue: Palais omnisports de Paris-Bercy

Champions

Singles
- (United States) Pete Sampras

Doubles
- (Netherlands) Jacco Eltingh / (Netherlands) Paul Haarhuis
← 1996 ·	Paris Masters	· 1998 →

The 1997 Paris Open was a men's tennis tournament played on indoor carpet courts. It was the 25th edition of the Paris Masters, and was part of the ATP Super 9 of the 1997 ATP Tour. It took place at the Palais omnisports de Paris-Bercy in Paris, France, from 27 October through 3 November 1997. First-seeded Pete Sampras won the singles title.

== Finals ==
=== Singles ===
(United States) Pete Sampras defeated (Sweden) Jonas Björkman 6–3, 4–6, 6–3, 6–1

- It was Sampras' 7th singles title of the year and the 51st of his career. It was his 2nd Masters title of the year, and 9th overall.

=== Doubles ===
(Netherlands) Jacco Eltingh / (Netherlands) Paul Haarhuis defeated (United States) Rick Leach / (United States) Jonathan Stark 6–2, 7–6
