= 1998 Paris Open =

- Date: 2–9 November
- Edition: 26th
- Category: ATP Super 9
- Draw: 48S / 24D
- Prize money: $2,300,000
- Surface: Carpet / indoor
- Location: Paris, France
- Venue: Palais omnisports de Paris-Bercy

Champions

Singles
- (United Kingdom) Greg Rusedski

Doubles
- (India) Mahesh Bhupathi / (India) Leander Paes
← 1997 ·	Paris Masters	· 1999 →

The 1998 Paris Open was a men's tennis tournament played on indoor carpet courts. It was the 26th edition of the Paris Masters, and is part of the ATP Super 9 of the 1998 ATP Tour. It took place at the Palais omnisports de Paris-Bercy in Paris, France, from 2 November through 9 November 1998. Thirteenth-seeded Greg Rusedski won the singles title.

== Finals ==
=== Singles ===
(United Kingdom) Greg Rusedski defeated (United States) Pete Sampras 6–4, 7–6^{(7–4)}, 6–3

- It was Greg Rusedski's 2nd singles title of the year and his 7th overall. It was his 1st Masters title of the year, and overall.

=== Doubles ===
(India) Mahesh Bhupathi / (India) Leander Paes defeated (Netherlands) Jacco Eltingh / (Netherlands) Paul Haarhuis 6–4, 6–2
