= 1998 MFS Pro Tennis Championships =

- Date: August 24–30
- Edition: 70th
- Category: World Series
- Draw: 32S / 16D
- Prize money: $315,000
- Surface: Hard / outdoor
- Location: Boston, United States
- Venue: Longwood Cricket Club

Champions

Singles
- (United States) Michael Chang

Doubles
- (Netherlands) Jacco Eltingh / (Netherlands) Paul Haarhuis
← 1997 ·	U.S. Pro Tennis Championships	· 1999 →

The 1998 MFS Pro Tennis Championships, also known as the U.S. Pro Tennis Championships, was a men's tennis tournament played on outdoor hard courts at the Longwood Cricket Club in Boston, United States that was part of the World Series of the 1998 ATP Tour. It was the 70th edition of the tournament and was held from August 24 through August 30, 1998. Michael Chang won the singles title.

== Finals ==
=== Singles ===
(United States) Michael Chang defeated (Netherlands) Paul Haarhuis, 6–3, 6–4

- It was Chang's 1st singles title of the year and the 32nd of his career.

=== Doubles ===
(Netherlands) Jacco Eltingh / (Netherlands) Paul Haarhuis defeated (South Africa) Chris Haggard / (United States) Jack Waite, 6–3, 6–2
