= 1998 U.S. Pro Tennis Championships – Doubles =

Doubles
- 1998 U.S. Pro Tennis Championships

Final
- Champions: (Netherlands) Jacco Eltingh (Netherlands) Paul Haarhuis
- Runners-up: (South Africa) Chris Haggard (United States) Jack Waite
- Score: 6–3, 6–2

Events
Singles	men	women
Doubles	men	women
← 1997 ·	U.S. Pro Tennis Championships	· 1999 →

The 1998 U.S. Pro Tennis Championships was a men's tennis tournament played on Hard courts in Boston, United States that was part of the International Series of the 1998 ATP Tour. It was the seventieth edition of the tournament and was held from 24 to 30 August 1998.

== Seeds ==
Champion seeds are indicated in bold text while text in italics indicates the round in which those seeds were eliminated.

1. (Netherlands) **Jacco Eltingh** / (Netherlands) **Paul Haarhuis (champion)**
2. (Czech Republic) Jiří Novák / (Czech Republic) David Rikl (semifinals)
3. (Argentina) Mariano Hood / (Argentina) Daniel Orsanic (quarterfinals)
4. (Argentina) Pablo Albano / (Ecuador) Nicolás Lapentti (semifinals)

== Draw ==
=== Key ===
- Q = Qualifier
- WC = Wild card
- LL = Lucky loser
- Alt = Alternate
- ITF = ITF entry
- PR = Protected ranking
- SR = Special ranking
- SE = Special exempt
- JE = Junior exempt
- JR = Junior Accelerator Programme entrant
- CO = College Accelerator Programme entrant
- NG = Next Gen Accelerator Program entrant
- w/o = Walkover
- r = Retired
- d = Defaulted

=== Finals ===
First round
1	(Netherlands) **J Eltingh** **(Netherlands) P Haarhuis**	**7**	**7**
(United States) G Grant (United States) A Reichel	5	6
(Hungary) **G Köves** **(United States) J Tarango**	**6**	**6**
(South Africa) M Barnard (Sweden) P Nyborg	4	4
4	(Argentina) **P Albano** **(Ecuador) N Lapentti**	**6**	3	**6**
(Argentina) G Cañas (Canada) B Kokavec	3	**6**	2
(United States) **M Keil** **(United States) TJ Middleton**	**6**	3	**6**
(France) J Golmard (France) F Santoro	3	**6**	3
(South Africa) **C Haggard** **(United States) J Waite**	5^{r}
(Netherlands) S Schalken (Netherlands) J van Lottum	6
3	(Argentina) **M Hood** **(Argentina) D Orsanic**	4	**6**	**6**
(South Africa) B Haygarth (United States) K Kinnear	**6**	0	3
(Belgium) **T Vanhoudt** **(Czech Republic) P Vízner**	**6**	**6**
(United States) S Campbell (Paraguay) R Delgado	3	2
2	(Czech Republic) **J Novák** **(Czech Republic) D Rikl**	**6**	**7**
(Argentina) L Arnold (Argentina) L Lobo	1	6

Quarterfinals
1	(Netherlands) **J Eltingh** **(Netherlands) P Haarhuis**	4	**7**	**7**
(Hungary) G Köves (United States) J Tarango	**6**	5	6
4	(Argentina) **P Albano** **(Ecuador) N Lapentti**	4	**7**	**6**
(United States) M Keil (United States) TJ Middleton	**6**	6	3
(South Africa) **C Haggard** **(United States) J Waite**	**6**	**6**
3	(Argentina) M Hood (Argentina) D Orsanic	3	1
(Belgium) T Vanhoudt (Czech Republic) P Vízner	6	4
2	(Czech Republic) **J Novák** **(Czech Republic) D Rikl**	**7**	**6**

Semifinals
1	(Netherlands) **J Eltingh** **(Netherlands) P Haarhuis**	**7**	**6**
4	(Argentina) P Albano (Ecuador) N Lapentti	5	3
(South Africa) **C Haggard** **(United States) J Waite**	3	**6**	**6**
2	(Czech Republic) J Novák (Czech Republic) D Rikl	**6**	2	1

Final
1	(Netherlands) **J Eltingh** **(Netherlands) P Haarhuis**	**6**	**6**
(South Africa) C Haggard (United States) J Waite	3	2
