= 1999 MFS Pro Tennis Championships – Singles =

Singles
- 1999 MFS Pro Tennis Championships

Final
- Champion: (Russia) Marat Safin
- Runner-up: (United Kingdom) Greg Rusedski
- Score: 6–4, 7–6^{(13–11)}

Details
- Draw: 32 (3WC/4Q)
- Seeds: 8

Events
| Singles | Doubles |
| ← 1998 · | U.S. Pro Tennis Championships |

Michael Chang was the defending champion, but did not compete this year.

Marat Safin won the title by defeating Greg Rusedski 6–4, 7–6^{(13–11)} in the final.

== Seeds ==
1. (United Kingdom) Greg Rusedski (final)
2. (Chile) Marcelo Ríos (quarterfinals)
3. (Spain) Félix Mantilla (second round)
4. (France) Cédric Pioline (second round)
5. (France) Sébastien Grosjean (quarterfinals)
6. (Russia) Marat Safin (champion)
7. (United States) Jim Courier (first round)
8. (Sweden) Jonas Björkman (quarterfinals)

== Draw ==
=== Key ===
- Q = Qualifier
- WC = Wild card
- LL = Lucky loser
- Alt = Alternate
- SE = Special exempt
- PR = Protected ranking
- ITF = ITF entry
- JE = Junior exempt
- w/o = Walkover
- r = Retired
- d = Defaulted
- SR = Special ranking

=== Finals ===
Semifinals
1/WC | (United Kingdom) Greg Rusedski | 6 | 5 | 6
(France) Arnaud Clément | 4 | 7 | 2
6 | (Russia) Marat Safin | 5 | 6 | 6
(Netherlands) Sjeng Schalken | 7 | 3 | 1

Final
1/WC | (United Kingdom) Greg Rusedski | 4 | 6^{11}
6 | (Russia) Marat Safin | 6 | 7^{13}

=== Top half ===
First round
1/WC | (United Kingdom) G Rusedski | 6^{3} | 6 | 7
Q | (Denmark) K Carlsen | 7^{7} | 2 | 5
(Spain) A Martín | 7 | 3 | 4
Q | (Greece) S Peppas | 5 | 6 | 6
(Costa Rica) JA Marín | 6^{1} | 4
(Philippines) C Mamiit | 7^{7} | 6
(Slovakia) J Krošlák | 2 | 6^{4}
8 | (Sweden) J Björkman | 6 | 7^{7}
3 | (Spain) F Mantilla | 7^{11} | 6
(Argentina) G Cañas | 6^{9} | 3
(France) A Clément | 3 | 7^{7} | 6
(Czech Republic) S Doseděl | 6 | 6^{1} | 2
(Romania) A Pavel | 3 | 0^{r}
(Australia) A Ilie | 6 | 1
(France) G Raoux | 4 | 6 | 3
5 | (France) S Grosjean | 6 | 3 | 6

Second round
1/WC | (United Kingdom) G Rusedski | 6 | 6
Q | (Greece) S Peppas | 3 | 3
(Philippines) C Mamiit | 0 | 7^{7} | 6^{6}
8 | (Sweden) J Björkman | 6 | 6^{3} | 7^{8}
3 | (Spain) F Mantilla | 2 | 1
(France) A Clément | 6 | 6
(Australia) A Ilie
5 | (France) S Grosjean | w/o

Quarterfinals
1/WC | (United Kingdom) G Rusedski | 7 | 6
8 | (Sweden) J Björkman | 5 | 3
(France) A Clément | 1 | 6 | 6
5 | (France) S Grosjean | 6 | 4 | 3

Semifinals
1/WC | (United Kingdom) G Rusedski | 6 | 5 | 6
(France) A Clément | 4 | 7 | 2

=== Bottom half ===
First round
6 | (Russia) M Safin | 7 | 7
(Italy) G Pozzi | 5 | 5
Q | (United States) B Bryan | 6 | 6
(Austria) M Hipfl | 3 | 2
Q | (United States) J Thomas | 2 | 1
(Germany) D Prinosil | 6 | 6
(Argentina) G Gaudio | 4 | 0
4 | (France) C Pioline | 6 | 6
7 | (United States) J Courier | 4 | 4
(Armenia) S Sargsian | 6 | 6
(Netherlands) P Haarhuis | 6 | 3 | 0
(Netherlands) S Schalken | 4 | 6 | 6
(Canada) D Nestor | 6 | 6
(Argentina) M Rodríguez | 2 | 2
WC | (United States) J Blake | 3 | 6^{4}
2/WC | (Chile) M Ríos | 6 | 7^{7}

Second round
6 | (Russia) M Safin | 6 | 7^{7}
Q | (United States) B Bryan | 4 | 6^{3}
(Germany) D Prinosil | 7^{7} | 6
4 | (France) C Pioline | 6^{1} | 3
(Armenia) S Sargsian | 2 | 3
(Netherlands) S Schalken | 6 | 6
(Canada) D Nestor | 7^{8} | 2 | 4
2/WC | (Chile) M Ríos | 6^{6} | 6 | 6

Quarterfinals
6 | (Russia) M Safin | 6 | 6
(Germany) D Prinosil | 4 | 2
(Netherlands) S Schalken | 7 | 6
2/WC | (Chile) M Ríos | 5 | 0

Semifinals
6 | (Russia) M Safin | 5 | 6 | 6
(Netherlands) S Schalken | 7 | 3 | 1
