= 1998 U.S. Pro Tennis Championships – Singles =

Singles
- 1998 U.S. Pro Tennis Championships

Final
- Champions: (United States) Michael Chang
- Runners-up: (Netherlands) Paul Haarhuis
- Score: 6–3, 6–4

Details
- Draw: 32
- Seeds: 8

Events
Singles	Doubles
← 1997 ·	U.S. Pro Tennis Championships	· 1999 →

The 1998 U.S. Pro Tennis Championships was a men's tennis tournament played on Hard courts in Boston, United States that was part of the International Series of the 1998 ATP Tour. It was the seventieth edition of the tournament and was held from 24 to 30 August 1998.

== Seeds ==
Champion seeds are indicated in bold text while text in italics indicates the round in which those seeds were eliminated.

1. (Sweden) Jonas Björkman (quarterfinals)
2. (Slovakia) Karol Kučera (first round)
3. (France) Cédric Pioline (semifinals)
4. (United States) **Michael Chang (champion)**
5. (Austria) Thomas Muster (first round)
6. (France) Fabrice Santoro (first round)
7. (Italy) Andrea Gaudenzi (first round)
8. Unknown (withdrew)

== Draw ==
=== Key ===
- Q = Qualifier
- WC = Wild card
- LL = Lucky loser
- Alt = Alternate
- SE = Special exempt
- PR = Protected ranking
- ITF = ITF entry
- JE = Junior exempt
- w/o = Walkover
- r = Retired
- d = Defaulted
- SR = Special ranking

=== Finals ===
Semifinals
(France) Sébastien Grosjean	5	**6**	**6**
4	**(United States) Michael Chang**	**7**	4	3
3	(France) Cédric Pioline	5	**6**	3
**(Netherlands) Paul Haarhuis**	**7**	4	**6**

Final
4	**(United States) Michael Chang**	**6**	**6**
(Netherlands) Paul Haarhuis	3	4

=== Top half ===
First round
1	**(Sweden) J Björkman**	**6**	**6**
(France) A Clément	2	3
**(Spain) G Blanco**	3	**6**	**6**
(Argentina) H Gumy	**6**	1	4
**(France) S Grosjean**	**6**	**6**
(Netherlands) J van Lottum	2	0
**(Belgium) X Malisse**	**6**	**6**
(United States) S Campbell	3	1
4	**(United States) M Chang**	**7**	**6**
(Romania) A Pavel	5	2
**(Denmark) K Carlsen**	3	**6**	**6**
(France) J Golmard	**6**	3	4
**(France) L Roux**	**6**	**6**
(Paraguay) R Delgado	4	2
**(Italy) G Pozzi**	**6**	**6**
6	(France) F Santoro	2	2

Second round
1	**(Sweden) J Björkman**	**6**	**7**
(Spain) G Blanco	2	6^{5}
**(France) S Grosjean**	**6**	**7**
(Belgium) X Malisse	4	5
4	**(United States) M Chang**	4	**6**	**6**
(Denmark) K Carlsen	**6**	3	4
(France) L Roux	**7**	2	6^{3}
**(Italy) G Pozzi**	5	**6**	**7**

Quarterfinals
1	(Sweden) J Björkman	6^{7}	1
**(France) S Grosjean**	**7**	**6**
4	**(United States) M Chang**	**6**	2	**6**
(Italy) G Pozzi	4	**6**	1

Semifinals
(France) S Grosjean	5	**6**	**6**
4	**(United States) M Chang**	**7**	4	3

=== Bottom half ===
First round
5	**(Austria) T Muster**	**6**	**6**
(Uruguay) M Filippini	0	2
**(Ecuador) N Lapentti**	6^{8}	**6**	**7**
(Spain) C Costa	**7**	4	5
**(Australia) A Ilie**	**6**	**6**
(Argentina) F Squillari	4	2
3	**(France) C Pioline**	**6**	**6**
(Romania) A Voinea	4	0
**(Czech Republic) J Novák**	4	**6**	**6**
7	(Italy) A Gaudenzi	**6**	1	1
**(Netherlands) P Haarhuis**	**6**	**6**
(Argentina) L Arnold	1	3
**(Netherlands) S Schalken**	**7**	**7**
(Italy) D Sanguinetti	6^{3}	6^{3}
**(United States) J Tarango**	**6**	**6**
2	(Slovakia) K Kučera	2	3

Second round
5	**(Austria) T Muster**	**6**	**6**
(Ecuador) N Lapentti	2	4
(Australia) A Ilie	4	2
3	**(France) C Pioline**	**6**	**6**
(Czech Republic) J Novák	1	**6**	5
**(Netherlands) P Haarhuis**	**6**	4	**7**
**(Netherlands) S Schalken**	**6**	**6**
(United States) J Tarango	1	1

Quarterfinals
5	(Austria) T Muster	5	3
3	**(France) C Pioline**	**7**	**6**
**(Netherlands) P Haarhuis**	0	**6**	**6**
(Netherlands) S Schalken	**6**	4	3

Semifinals
3	(France) C Pioline	5	**6**	3
**(Netherlands) P Haarhuis**	**7**	4	**6**
