= 1997 MFS Pro Tennis Championships – Singles =

Singles
- 1997 MFS Pro Tennis Championships

Final
- Champion: (Netherlands) Sjeng Schalken
- Runner-up: (Chile) Marcelo Ríos
- Score: 7–5, 6–3

Details
- Draw: 32 (3WC/4Q/1LL)
- Seeds: 8

Events
Singles	Doubles
- U.S. Pro Tennis Championships

Ivan Lendl was the last champion of the tournament in 1994, but retired from professional tennis at the same year. The 1995 final was suspended due to rain.

Sjeng Schalken won the title by defeating Marcelo Ríos 7–5, 6–3 in the final.

== Seeds ==
1. (Spain) Àlex Corretja (quarterfinals)
2. (Chile) Marcelo Ríos (final)
3. (Spain) Félix Mantilla (second round)
4. (n/a)
5. (Spain) Albert Costa (semifinals)
6. (United Kingdom) Greg Rusedski (quarterfinals)
7. (Sweden) Magnus Norman (first round)
8. (Spain) Alberto Berasategui (first round)

== Draw ==
Key

- Q = Qualifier
- WC = Wild card
- LL = Lucky loser
- Alt = Alternate
- ITF = ITF entry
- PR = Protected ranking
- SR = Special ranking
- SE = Special exempt
- JE = Junior exempt
- JR = Junior Accelerator Programme entrant
- CO = College Accelerator Programme entrant
- NG = Next Gen Accelerator Program entrant
- w/o = Walkover
- r = Retired
- d = Defaulted

=== Finals ===
Semifinals
(Netherlands) Sjeng Schalken	6	5	6
5	(Spain) Albert Costa	4	7	3
(United States) Jeff Tarango	4	3
2	(Chile) Marcelo Ríos	6	6

Final
(Netherlands) Sjeng Schalken	7	6
2	(Chile) Marcelo Ríos	5	3

=== Top half ===
First round
1	(Spain) À Corretja	6	6
(Spain) F Clavet	3	4
WC	(United States) P McEnroe	2	2
Q	(Argentina) G Cañas	6	6
(Netherlands) S Schalken	6^{2}	6	6
(France) L Roux	7^{7}	4	4
(Czech Republic) S Doseděl	6	6^{5}	7^{7}
7	(Sweden) M Norman	3	7^{7}	6^{3}
LL	(Netherlands) D van Scheppingen	6	6
(Brazil) F Meligeni	4	4
(France) G Raoux	4	4
(Belgium) J Van Herck	6	6
Q	(Canada) A Chang	3	2
Q	(Denmark) K Carlsen	6	6
WC	(Slovakia) D Hrbatý	2	2
5	(Spain) A Costa	6	6

Second round
1	(Spain) À Corretja	6	6
Q	(Argentina) G Cañas	3	4
(Netherlands) S Schalken	2	6	7
(Czech Republic) S Doseděl	6	1	5
LL	(Netherlands) D van Scheppingen	5	3
(Belgium) J Van Herck	7	6
Q	(Denmark) K Carlsen	3	4
5	(Spain) A Costa	6	6

Quarterfinals
1	(Spain) À Corretja	3	6	3
(Netherlands) S Schalken	6	3	6
(Belgium) J Van Herck	7^{7}	2	1
5	(Spain) A Costa	6^{3}	6	6

Semifinals
(Netherlands) S Schalken	6	5	6
5	(Spain) A Costa	4	7	3

=== Bottom half ===
First round
6	(United Kingdom) G Rusedski	6	3	6
(Sweden) M Tillström	1	6	3
(Belgium) F Dewulf	6	1	6
(Czech Republic) J Novák	1	6	2
(United States) J Tarango	6	6^{3}	6
WC	(United States) A O'Brien	2	7^{7}	3
(Spain) JA Viloca	3	0
3	(Spain) F Mantilla	6	6
8	(Spain) A Berasategui	6^{3}	6	3
(Spain) G Blanco	7^{7}	3	6
(Argentina) H Gumy	7^{7}	2	6
Q	(France) J Golmard	6^{2}	6	4
(Italy) R Furlan	4	6	6
(Netherlands) P Haarhuis	6	4	1
(United States) J Stark	7^{7}	2	6^{1}
2	(Chile) M Ríos	6^{1}	6	7^{7}

Second round
6	(United Kingdom) G Rusedski	6	6
(Belgium) F Dewulf	3	1
(United States) J Tarango	6	6
3	(Spain) F Mantilla	0	4
(Spain) G Blanco	4	2
(Argentina) H Gumy	6	6
(Italy) R Furlan	4	4
2	(Chile) M Ríos	6	6

Quarterfinals
6	(United Kingdom) G Rusedski	6^{10}	6^{2}
(United States) J Tarango	7^{12}	7^{7}
(Argentina) H Gumy	4	3
2	(Chile) M Ríos	6	6

Semifinals
(United States) J Tarango	4	3
2	(Chile) M Ríos	6	6
