= 1999 Paris Open – Singles =

Singles
- 1999 Paris Open

Final
- Champion: (United States) Andre Agassi
- Runner-up: (Russia) Marat Safin
- Score: 7–6^{(7–1)}, 6–2, 4–6, 6–4

Details
- Draw: 48 (4WC/6Q/2LL)
- Seeds: 16

Events
| Singles | Doubles |
| ← 1998 · | Paris Open | · 2000 → |

Andre Agassi defeated Marat Safin in the final, 7–6^{(7–1)}, 6–2, 4–6, 6–4 to win the singles tennis title at the 1999 Paris Open.

Greg Rusedski was the defending champion, but lost in the second round to Albert Costa.

== Seeds ==
A champion seed is indicated in bold text while text in italics indicates the round in which that seed was eliminated. All sixteen seeds received a bye into the second round.

1. (United States) **Andre Agassi (champion)**
2. (Russia) Yevgeny Kafelnikov (second round)
3. (United States) Pete Sampras (third round)
4. (United States) Todd Martin (second round)
5. (Brazil) Gustavo Kuerten (second round)
6. (United Kingdom) Greg Rusedski (second round)
7. (Germany) ~~Nicolas Kiefer~~ (withdrew)
8. (Netherlands) Richard Krajicek (second round)
9. (Chile) Marcelo Ríos (second round)
10. (United Kingdom) Tim Henman (third round)
11. (Ecuador) Nicolás Lapentti (semifinals)
12. (Spain) Álex Corretja (second round)
13. (Germany) Tommy Haas (quarterfinals)
14. (Spain) Carlos Moyà (second round)
15. (France) Cédric Pioline (quarterfinals)
16. (Slovakia) Karol Kučera (second round)

== Draw ==
=== Key ===
- Q = Qualifier
- WC = Wild card
- LL = Lucky loser
- Alt = Alternate
- SE = Special exempt
- PR = Protected ranking
- ITF = ITF entry
- JE = Junior exempt
- w/o = Walkover
- r = Retired
- d = Defaulted
- SR = Special ranking

=== Finals ===
Quarterfinals
1 | **(United States) Andre Agassi** | **6** | **6**
(Australia) Mark Philippoussis | 4 | 1
13 | (Germany) Tommy Haas | 4 | **6** | 3
11 | **(Ecuador) Nicolás Lapentti** | **6** | 3 | **6**
**(Russia) Marat Safin** | **6** | **6**
(United States) Jim Courier | 2 | 4
Q | **(United States) Michael Chang** | 5 | **7^{8}** | **6**
15 | (France) Cédric Pioline | **7** | 6^{6} | 4

Semifinals
1 | (United States) **Andre Agassi** | 3 | **6** | **6**
11 | (Ecuador) Nicolás Lapentti | **6** | 3 | 2
(Russia) **Marat Safin** | 6^{5} | **7^{7}** | **6**
Q | (United States) Michael Chang | **7^{7}** | 6^{5} | 3

Final
1 | (United States) **Andre Agassi** | **7^{7}** | **6** | 4 | **6**
(Russia) Marat Safin | 6^{1} | 2 | **6** | 4

=== Top half ===
==== Section 1 ====
First round
(Morocco) **Y El Aynaoui** | **6** | **6**
(United States) V Spadea | 2 | 4
WC | (France) A Clément | 6^{4} | **6** | 6^{2}
Q | (Netherlands) **S Schalken** | **7^{7}** | 4 | **7^{7}**
(South Africa) W Ferreira | **6** | 2 | 2
LL | (Spain) **J C Ferrero** | 4 | **6** | **6**
(Australia) **M Philippoussis** | **6** | **7^{7}**
WC | (France) N Escudé | 4 | 6^{4}

Second round
1 | (United States) **A Agassi** | **6** | **6**
(Morocco) Y El Aynaoui | 4 | 3
Q | (Netherlands) **S Schalken** | **6** | **6**
16 | (Slovakia) K Kučera | 3 | 4
10 | (United Kingdom) **T Henman** | 4 | **7^{9}** | **6**
LL | (Spain) J C Ferrero | **6** | 6^{7} | 4
(Australia) **M Philippoussis** | **7** | **6**
8 | (Netherlands) R Krajicek | 5 | 3

Third round
1 | (United States) **A Agassi** | **6** | 3 | **6**
Q | (Netherlands) S Schalken | 4 | **6** | 2
10 | (United Kingdom) T Henman | 1 | **6** | 3
(Australia) **M Philippoussis** | **6** | 3 | **6**

Quarterfinals
1 | (United States) **A Agassi** | **6** | **6**
(Australia) M Philippoussis | 4 | 1

==== Section 2 ====
First round
(Spain) **F Clavet** | **6** | **6**
(Czech Republic) J Novák | 4 | 1
Q | (Austria) **S Koubek** | **7** | **6**
(Slovakia) D Hrbatý | 5 | 4
Q | (Germany) R Schüttler | 2 | 3
(France) **F Santoro** | **6** | **6**
(Sweden) M Norman | **6** | 3 | 2
(Spain) **Á Costa** | 4 | **6** | **6**

Second round
3 | (United States) **P Sampras** | 4 | **6** | **7^{7}**
(Spain) F Clavet | **6** | 3 | 6^{4}
Q | (Austria) S Koubek | 3 | 2
13 | (Germany) **T Haas** | **6** | **6**
11 | (Ecuador) **N Lapentti** | **6** | **7^{7}**
(France) F Santoro | 3 | 6^{5}
(Spain) **Á Costa** | **7^{9}**
6 | (United Kingdom) G Rusedski | 6^{7} | r

Third round
3 | (United States) P Sampras
13 | (Germany) **T Haas** | w/o
11 | (Ecuador) **N Lapentti** | **6** | **7**
(Spain) Á Costa | 2 | 5

Quarterfinals
13 | (Germany) T Haas | 4 | **6** | 3
11 | (Ecuador) **N Lapentti** | **6** | 3 | **6**

=== Bottom half ===
==== Section 3 ====
First round
(Russia) **M Safin** | 6^{5} | **7** | **6**
(Argentina) M Zabaleta | **7^{7}** | 5 | 3
Q | (Switzerland) G Bastl | 6^{7} | 2
(Switzerland) **M Rosset** | **7^{9}** | **6**
WC | (France) A Di Pasquale | 6^{5} | **6** | 6^{6}
(United States) **J Courier** | **7^{7}** | 3 | **7^{8}**
(Sweden) **T Enqvist** | 3 | **6** | **7^{7}**
(France) S Grosjean | **6** | 4 | 6^{5}

Second round
5 | (Brazil) G Kuerten | 6^{4} | **6** | 6^{4}
(Russia) **M Safin** | **7^{7}** | 3 | **7^{7}**
(Switzerland) **M Rosset** | **7** | **6**
12 | (Spain) Á Corretja | 5 | 3
14 | (Spain) C Moyà | 2 | 1
(United States) **J Courier** | **6** | **6**
(Sweden) **T Enqvist** | 4 | **7^{7}** | **7^{8}**
4 | (United States) T Martin | **6** | 6^{5} | 6^{6}

Third round
(Russia) **M Safin** | **6** | **6**
(Switzerland) M Rosset | 4 | 4
(United States) **J Courier** | 6^{3} | **7^{7}** | **7**
(Sweden) T Enqvist | **7^{7}** | 6^{4} | 5

Quarterfinals
(Russia) **M Safin** | **6** | **6**
(United States) J Courier | 2 | 4

==== Section 4 ====
First round
Q | (Netherlands) **J van Lottum** | **6** | **6**
(Spain) F Mantilla | 3 | 2
Q | (United States) **M Chang** | 6^{7} | **7** | **6**
(Sweden) T Johansson | **7^{9}** | 5 | 4
(Ukraine) **A Medvedev** | **6** | **6**
WC | (France) G Raoux | 3 | 4
(Brazil) F Meligeni | 3 | 2
(Australia) **L Hewitt** | **6** | **6**

Second round
LL | (Armenia) S Sargsian | 3 | 6^{7}
Q | (Netherlands) **J van Lottum** | **6** | **7^{9}**
Q | (United States) **M Chang** | **7** | **6**
9 | (Chile) M Ríos | 5 | 2
15 | (France) **C Pioline** | **6** | **6**
(Ukraine) A Medvedev | 1 | 4
(Australia) **L Hewitt** | **6** | 2 | **6**
2 | (Russia) Y Kafelnikov | 4 | **6** | 4

Third round
Q | (Netherlands) J van Lottum | 1 | 2
Q | (United States) **M Chang** | **6** | **6**
15 | (France) **C Pioline** | **7^{7}** | 3 | **7^{8}**
(Australia) L Hewitt | 6^{4} | **6** | 6^{6}

Quarterfinals
Q | (United States) **M Chang** | 5 | **7^{8}** | **6**
15 | (France) C Pioline | **7** | 6^{6} | 4

== Qualifying ==
=== Qualifying seeds ===
1. (Morocco) Hicham Arazi (first round)
2. (Croatia) Goran Ivanišević (first round)
3. (Austria) **Stefan Koubek (qualified)**
4. (Germany) **Rainer Schüttler (qualified)**
5. (Spain) Juan Carlos Ferrero (qualifying competition, **lucky loser**)
6. (Armenia) Sargis Sargsian (qualifying competition, **lucky loser**)
7. (Czech Republic) Daniel Vacek (first round)
8. (Netherlands) **Sjeng Schalken (qualified)**
9. (n/a)
10. (Argentina) Guillermo Cañas (qualifying competition)
11. (United States) Jeff Tarango (first round)
12. (United States) **Michael Chang (qualified)**

=== Qualifiers ===
1. (United States) **Michael Chang**
2. (Switzerland) **George Bastl**
3. (Austria) **Stefan Koubek**
4. (Germany) **Rainer Schüttler**
5. (Netherlands) **John van Lottum**
6. (Netherlands) **Sjeng Schalken**

=== Lucky losers ===
1. (Spain) **Juan Carlos Ferrero**
2. (Armenia) **Sargis Sargsian**

=== Qualifying draw ===
==== First qualifier ====
First round
1 | (Morocco) Hicham Arazi | 3 | 3
**(Croatia) Ivan Ljubičić** | **6** | **6**
(France) Jean-René Lisnard | 5 | 1
12 | **(United States) Michael Chang** | **7** | **6**

Qualifying competition
(Croatia) Ivan Ljubičić | **6** | 6 | 5
12 | **(United States) Michael Chang** | 4 | **7** | **7**

==== Second qualifier ====
First round
2 | (Croatia) Goran Ivanišević | 6 | 6
WC | **(France) Julien Boutter** | **7** | **7**
**(Switzerland) George Bastl** | **6** | **6**
11 | (United States) Jeff Tarango | 2 | 3

Qualifying competition
WC | (France) Julien Boutter | 4 | 6
**(Switzerland) George Bastl** | **6** | **7**

==== Third qualifier ====
First round
3 | **(Austria) Stefan Koubek** | 4 | **6** | **6**
WC | (France) Michaël Llodra | **6** | 2 | 3
(United States) Justin Gimelstob | 4 | **6** | 2
10 | **(Argentina) Guillermo Cañas** | **6** | 0 | **6**

Qualifying competition
3 | **(Austria) Stefan Koubek** | **6** | **6**
10 | (Argentina) Guillermo Cañas | 3 | 2

==== Fourth qualifier ====
First round
4 | **(Germany) Rainer Schüttler** | **6** | **7**
(Canada) Daniel Nestor | 1 | 5
(France) Antony Dupuis | 4 | **6** | 4
**(Zimbabwe) Wayne Black** | **6** | 3 | **6**

Qualifying competition
4 | **(Germany) Rainer Schüttler** | 4 | **6** | **7**
(Zimbabwe) Wayne Black | **6** | 2 | 5

==== Fifth qualifier ====
First round
5 | **(Spain) Juan Carlos Ferrero** | **6** | 5 | **6**
(Australia) Wayne Arthurs | 4 | **7** | 2
**(Netherlands) John van Lottum** | **6** | 4 | **6**
7 | (Czech Republic) Daniel Vacek | 4 | **6** | 1

Qualifying competition
5 | (Spain) Juan Carlos Ferrero | 4 | **6** | 3
**(Netherlands) John van Lottum** | **6** | 4 | **6**

==== Sixth qualifier ====
First round
6 | **(Armenia) Sargis Sargsian** | **6** | **6**
(Slovakia) Ján Krošlák | 4 | 2
WC | (France) Stéphane Huet | 3 | 4
8 | **(Netherlands) Sjeng Schalken** | **6** | **6**

Qualifying competition
6 | (Armenia) Sargis Sargsian | 6 | 3
8 | **(Netherlands) Sjeng Schalken** | **7** | **6**
