= 1999 Paris Open – Doubles =

Doubles
- 1999 Paris Open

Final
- Champions: (Canada) Sébastien Lareau; (United States) Alex O'Brien
- Runners-up: (Netherlands) Paul Haarhuis; (United States) Jared Palmer
- Score: 7–6^{(9–7)}, 7–5

Details
- Draw: 24
- Seeds: 8

Events
Singles	Doubles
← 1998 ·	Paris Open	· 2000 →

Mahesh Bhupathi and Leander Paes were the defending champions. Bhupathi partnered Andrew Florent this year, losing in the second round. Paes did not participate this year.

Sébastien Lareau and Alex O'Brien won in the final 7–6^{(9–7)}, 7–5, against Paul Haarhuis and Jared Palmer.

== Seeds ==
All seeds receive a bye into the second round.

1. (Canada) Sébastien Lareau / (United States) Alex O'Brien (champions)
2. (Netherlands) Paul Haarhuis / (United States) Jared Palmer (final)
3. (Sweden) Jonas Björkman / (Zimbabwe) Byron Black (second round)
4. (Australia) Todd Woodbridge / (Australia) Mark Woodforde (quarterfinals)
5. (Zimbabwe) Wayne Black / (Australia) Sandon Stolle (second round)
6. (South Africa) Ellis Ferreira / (United States) Rick Leach (semifinals)
7. (France) Olivier Delaître / (France) Fabrice Santoro (second round)
8. (India) Mahesh Bhupathi / (Australia) Andrew Florent (second round)

== Draw ==
=== Key ===
- Q = Qualifier
- WC = Wild card
- LL = Lucky loser
- Alt = Alternate
- SE = Special exempt
- PR = Protected ranking
- ITF = ITF entry
- JE = Junior exempt
- w/o = Walkover
- r = Retired
- d = Defaulted
- SR = Special ranking

=== Finals ===
Semifinals

Final

1
- (Canada) Sébastien Lareau
- (United States) Alex O'Brien
6
6

- (The Bahamas) Mark Knowles
- (Canada) Daniel Nestor
2
4

1
- (Canada) Sébastien Lareau
- (United States) Alex O'Brien
7^{9}
7

2
- (Netherlands) Paul Haarhuis
- (United States) Jared Palmer
6^{7}
5

6
- (South Africa) Ellis Ferreira
- (United States) Rick Leach
4
6
2

2
- (Netherlands) Paul Haarhuis
- (United States) Jared Palmer
6
2
6

=== Top half ===
First round

Second round

Quarterfinals

Semifinals

1
- (Canada) S Lareau
- (United States) A O'Brien
6
6

- (United States) J Tarango
- (Australia) P Tramacchi
2
6
3

- (United States) R Reneberg
- (United States) J Stark
2
4

- (United States) R Reneberg
- (United States) J Stark
6
4
6

1
- (Canada) S Lareau
- (United States) A O'Brien
7^{7}
6

- (Czech Republic) J Novák
- (Czech Republic) D Rikl
4
6^{1}

- (South Africa) W Ferreira
- (Russia) Y Kafelnikov
6^{2}
4

- (South Africa) W Ferreira
- (Russia) Y Kafelnikov
6
7^{7}

- (South Africa) W Ferreira
- (Russia) Y Kafelnikov
6
6

7
- (France) O Delaître
- (France) F Santoro
4
3

1
- (Canada) S Lareau
- (United States) A O'Brien
6
6

- (The Bahamas) M Knowles
- (Canada) D Nestor
2
4

3
- (Sweden) J Björkman
- (Zimbabwe) B Black
3
6
4

- (Australia) W Arthurs
- (Australia) A Kratzmann
6
6

- (Australia) W Arthurs
- (Australia) A Kratzmann
6
4
6

WC
- (France) A Di Pasquale
- (Monaco) J-R Lisnard
4
3

- (Australia) W Arthurs
- (Australia) A Kratzmann
1
6
4

- (South Africa) P Norval
- (Zimbabwe) K Ullyett
6
2
5

- (The Bahamas) M Knowles
- (Canada) D Nestor
6
1
6

- (The Bahamas) M Knowles
- (Canada) D Nestor
2
6
7

- (The Bahamas) M Knowles
- (Canada) D Nestor
4
7^{7}
6

5
- (Zimbabwe) W Black
- (Australia) S Stolle
6
6^{3}
3

=== Bottom half ===
First round

Second round

Quarterfinals

Semifinals

6
- (South Africa) E Ferreira
- (United States) R Leach
4
7^{8}
6

WC
- (France) A Clément
- (France) S Grosjean
3
4

- (South Africa) D Adams
- (South Africa) J-L de Jager
6
6^{6}
4

- (South Africa) D Adams
- (South Africa) J-L de Jager
6
6

6
- (South Africa) E Ferreira
- (United States) R Leach
6^{6}
6
7^{7}

WC
- (Brazil) G Kuerten
- (Ecuador) N Lapentti
1
1^{r}

4
- (Australia) T Woodbridge
- (Australia) M Woodforde
7^{8}
4
6^{3}

WC
- (France) N Escudé
- (France) G Raoux
6
0

WC
- (France) N Escudé
- (France) G Raoux
2
1

4
- (Australia) T Woodbridge
- (Australia) M Woodforde
6
6

6
- (South Africa) E Ferreira
- (United States) R Leach
4
6
2

2
- (Netherlands) P Haarhuis
- (United States) J Palmer
6
2
6

8
- (India) M Bhupathi
- (Australia) A Florent
1
3

- (United States) J Gimelstob
- (Czech Republic) D Vacek
7^{7}
6

- (United States) J Gimelstob
- (Czech Republic) D Vacek
6
6

Q
- (South Africa) C Haggard
- (Sweden) P Nyborg
6^{3}
3

- (United States) J Gimelstob
- (Czech Republic) D Vacek
6
2
5

- (South Africa) B Haygarth
- (Czech Republic) C Suk
4
2

2
- (Netherlands) P Haarhuis
- (United States) J Palmer
2
6
7

- (North Macedonia) A Kitinov
- (Russia) A Olhovskiy
6
6

- (North Macedonia) A Kitinov
- (Russia) A Olhovskiy
6^{2}
6^{4}

2
- (Netherlands) P Haarhuis
- (United States) J Palmer
7^{7}
7^{7}
