= 1999 MFS Pro Tennis Championships =

- Date: August 23–29
- Edition: 71st
- Category: World Series
- Draw: 32S / 16D
- Prize money: $325,000
- Surface: Hard / outdoor
- Location: Boston, United States
- Venue: Longwood Cricket Club

Champions

Singles
- (Russia) Marat Safin

Doubles
- (Argentina) Guillermo Cañas / (Argentina) Martín García
← 1998 ·	U.S. Pro Tennis Championships

The 1999 MFS Pro Tennis Championships, also known as the U.S. Pro Tennis Championships, was a men's tennis tournament played on outdoor hard courts at the Longwood Cricket Club in Boston, United States that was part of the World Series of the 1999 ATP Tour. It was the 71st and last edition of the tournament and was held from August 23 through August 29, 1999. Sixth-seeded Marat Safin won the singles title.

== Finals ==
=== Singles ===
(Russia) Marat Safin defeated (United Kingdom) Greg Rusedski 6–4, 7–6^{(13–11)}

- It was Safin's 1st singles title of his career.

=== Doubles ===
(Argentina) Guillermo Cañas / (Argentina) Martín García defeated (South Africa) Marius Barnard / (United States) T. J. Middleton 5–7, 7–6^{(7–2)}, 6–3
