= 1997 Paris Open – Singles =

Singles
- 1997 Paris Open

Final
- Champion: (United States) Pete Sampras
- Runner-up: (Sweden) Jonas Björkman
- Score: 6–3, 4–6, 6–3, 6–1

Details
- Draw: 48 (6 Q / 4 WC)
- Seeds: 16

Events
Singles	Doubles
← 1996 ·	Paris Open	· 1998 →

Pete Sampras defeated Jonas Björkman in the final, 6–3, 4–6, 6–3, 6–1 to win the singles tennis title at the 1997 Paris Open.

Thomas Enqvist was the defending champion, but lost in the semifinals to Björkman.

== Seeds ==
A champion seed is indicated in bold text while text in italics indicates the round in which that seed was eliminated. All sixteen seeds received a bye into the second round.

1. (United States) **Pete Sampras (champion)**
2. (United States) Michael Chang (second round)
3. (Australia) Patrick Rafter (third round)
4. (United Kingdom) Greg Rusedski (quarterfinals)
5. (Russia) Yevgeny Kafelnikov (semifinals)
6. (Spain) Carlos Moyà (second round)
7. (Spain) Sergi Bruguera (third round)
8. (Austria) Thomas Muster (quarterfinals)
9. (Chile) Marcelo Ríos (second round)
10. (Spain) Álex Corretja (third round)
11. (Brazil) Gustavo Kuerten (second round)
12. (Sweden) Jonas Björkman (final)
13. (Spain) Félix Mantilla (second round)
14. (Netherlands) Richard Krajicek (quarterfinals)
15. (Sweden) Thomas Enqvist (semifinals)
16. (Czech Republic) Petr Korda (third round)

== Draw ==
=== Key ===
- Q = Qualifier
- WC = Wild card
- LL = Lucky loser
- Alt = Alternate
- SE = Special exempt
- PR = Protected ranking
- ITF = ITF entry
- JE = Junior exempt
- w/o = Walkover
- r = Retired
- d = Defaulted
- SR = Special ranking

=== Finals ===
Quarterfinals
1	**(United States) Pete Sampras**	**6**	4	**6**
8	(Austria) Thomas Muster	1	**6**	2
4	(United Kingdom) Greg Rusedski	4	**6**	3
5	**(Russia) Yevgeny Kafelnikov**	**6**	3	**6**
12	**(Sweden) Jonas Björkman**	**6**	0
14	(Netherlands) Richard Krajicek	4	1^{r}
WC	(France) Guillaume Raoux	5	2
15	**(Sweden) Thomas Enqvist**	**7**	**6**

Semifinals
1	(United States) **Pete Sampras**	**7^{7}**	**6**
5	(Russia) Yevgeny Kafelnikov	6^{2}	3
12	(Sweden) **Jonas Björkman**	**7^{7}**	**7**
15	(Sweden) Thomas Enqvist	6^{5}	5

Final
1	(United States) **Pete Sampras**	**6**	4	**6**	**6**
12	(Sweden) Jonas Björkman	3	**6**	3	1

=== Top half ===
==== Section 1 ====
First round
(Germany) **B Becker**	**6**	**6**
(Australia) M Woodforde	2	4
(Switzerland) M Rosset	**7**	2	4
WC	(France) **A Clément**	5	**6**	**6**
(United Kingdom) **T Henman**	**6**	**6**
(Morocco) H Arazi	1	0
(United States) C Woodruff	4	6^{3}
(Sweden) **M Norman**	**6**	**7^{7}**

Second round
1	(United States) **P Sampras**	**7^{7}**	3	**6**
(Germany) B Becker	6^{4}	**6**	3
WC	(France) A Clément	4	4
16	(Czech Republic) **P Korda**	**6**	**6**
10	(Spain) **Á Corretja**	**6**	**7**
(United Kingdom) T Henman	3	5
(Sweden) M Norman	3	6^{6}
8	(Austria) **T Muster**	**6**	**7^{8}**

Third round
1	(United States) **P Sampras**	4	**7^{7}**	**6**
16	(Czech Republic) P Korda	**6**	6^{2}	4
10	(Spain) Á Corretja	5	4
8	(Austria) **T Muster**	**7**	**6**

Quarterfinals
1	(United States) **P Sampras**	**6**	4	**6**
8	(Austria) T Muster	1	**6**	2

==== Section 2 ====
First round
(Netherlands) **J Siemerink**	4	**7^{8}**	**6**
(United States) T Martin	**6**	6^{6}	2
(United States) J Courier	6^{5}	1
(Czech Republic) **B Ulihrach**	**7^{7}**	**6**
WC	(France) **N Escudé**	**6**	**6**
(Spain) A Berasategui	4	1
Q	(Czech Republic) **D Vacek**	4	**7^{7}**	**6**
Q	(United States) J Tarango	**6**	6^{5}	1

Second round
4	(United Kingdom) **G Rusedski**	**6**	**6**
(Netherlands) J Siemerink	4	3
(Czech Republic) **B Ulihrach**	**7^{11}**	5	**7^{7}**
13	(Spain) F Mantilla	6^{9}	**7**	6^{3}
11	(Brazil) G Kuerten	6^{8}	3
WC	(France) **N Escudé**	**7^{10}**	**6**
Q	(Czech Republic) D Vacek	1	2
5	(Russia) **Y Kafelnikov**	**6**	**6**

Third round
4	(United Kingdom) **G Rusedski**	**7**	**6**
(Czech Republic) B Ulihrach	5	3
WC	(France) N Escudé	3	4
5	(Russia) **Y Kafelnikov**	**6**	**6**

Quarterfinals
4	(United Kingdom) G Rusedski	4	**6**	3
5	(Russia) **Y Kafelnikov**	**6**	3	**6**

=== Bottom half ===
==== Section 3 ====
First round
(Australia) **T Woodbridge**	**6**	**6**
Q	(Sweden) M Tillström	3	3
(Sweden) **T Johansson**	**6**	6^{2}	**6**
Q	(Netherlands) S Schalken	4	**7^{7}**	3
(Sweden) M Larsson	**6**	4	6^{6}
(France) **F Santoro**	0	**6**	**7^{8}**
(France) **C Pioline**	**6**	**6**
WC	(France) L Roux	2	4

Second round
6	(Spain) C Moyà	6^{1}	2
(Australia) **T Woodbridge**	**7^{7}**	**6**
(Sweden) T Johansson	3	**7^{8}**	6^{3}
12	(Sweden) **J Björkman**	**6**	6^{6}	**7^{7}**
14	(Netherlands) **R Krajicek**	**6**	**6**
(France) F Santoro	3	4
(France) C Pioline	**7^{7}**	6^{3}	1
3	(Australia) **P Rafter**	6^{2}	**7^{7}**	**6**

Third round
(Australia) T Woodbridge	6^{4}	5
12	(Sweden) **J Björkman**	**7^{7}**	**7**
14	(Netherlands) **R Krajicek**	**7**	**6**
3	(Australia) P Rafter	5	2

Quarterfinals
12	(Sweden) **J Björkman**	**6**	**0**
14	(Netherlands) R Krajicek	4	1	r

==== Section 4 ====
First round
(Germany) **M-K Goellner**	**6**	5	**6**
(Spain) A Portas	3	**7**	3
(Belgium) F Dewulf	5	3
WC	(France) **G Raoux**	**7**	**6**
Q	(Armenia) S Sargsian	**6**	3	6^{4}
Q	(Germany) **D Prinosil**	4	**6**	**7^{7}**
(Czech Republic) M Damm	6^{5}	**7**	4
(Sweden) **M Gustafsson**	**7^{7}**	5	**6**

Second round
7	(Spain) **S Bruguera**	**6**	**7^{7}**
(Germany) M-K Goellner	3	6^{3}
WC	(France) **G Raoux**	**7^{7}**	3	**7**
9	(Chile) M Ríos	6^{4}	**6**	5
15	(Sweden) **T Enqvist**	**7**	**6**
Q	(Germany) D Prinosil	5	1
(Sweden) **M Gustafsson**	**6**	**6**
2	(United States) M Chang	3	2

Third round
7	(Spain) S Bruguera	4	**6**	5
WC	(France) **G Raoux**	**6**	3	**7**
15	(Sweden) **T Enqvist**	**6**	**6**
(Sweden) M Gustafsson	1	4

Quarterfinals
WC	(France) G Raoux	5	2
15	(Sweden) **T Enqvist**	**7**	**6**
