= 1998 Paris Open – Doubles =

Doubles
- 1998 Paris Open

Final
- Champions: (India) Mahesh Bhupathi; (India) Leander Paes
- Runners-up: (Netherlands) Jacco Eltingh; (Netherlands) Paul Haarhuis
- Score: 6–4, 6–2

Details
- Draw: 24 (4WC/1Q)
- Seeds: 8

Events
Singles	Doubles
← 1997 ·	Paris Masters	· 1999 →

Jacco Eltingh and Paul Haarhuis were the defending champions. Mahesh Bhupathi and Leander Paes won in the final 6–4, 6–2, against Eltingh and Haarhuis.

== Seeds ==
All seeds receive a bye into the second round.

1. (Netherlands) Jacco Eltingh / (Netherlands) Paul Haarhuis (final)
2. (Australia) Todd Woodbridge / (Australia) Mark Woodforde (quarterfinals)
3. (India) Mahesh Bhupathi / (India) Leander Paes (champions)
4. (The Bahamas) Mark Knowles / (Canada) Daniel Nestor (semifinals)
5. (South Africa) Ellis Ferreira / (United States) Rick Leach (second round)
6. (Czech Republic) Cyril Suk / (Australia) Sandon Stolle (quarterfinals)
7. (Czech Republic) Martin Damm / (United States) Jim Grabb (second round)
8. (France) Olivier Delaître / (France) Fabrice Santoro (second round)

== Draw ==
Key

- Q = Qualifier
- WC = Wild card
- LL = Lucky loser
- Alt = Alternate
- ITF = ITF entry
- PR = Protected ranking
- SR = Special ranking
- SE = Special exempt
- JE = Junior exempt
- JR = Junior Accelerator Programme entrant
- CO = College Accelerator Programme entrant
- NG = Next Gen Accelerator Program entrant
- w/o = Walkover
- r = Retired
- d = Defaulted

=== Finals ===
Semifinals

Final

1
- (Netherlands) Jacco Eltingh
- (Netherlands) Paul Haarhuis
6
4
6

4
- (The Bahamas) Mark Knowles
- (Canada) Daniel Nestor
3
6
4

1
- (Netherlands) Jacco Eltingh
- (Netherlands) Paul Haarhuis
4
2

3
- (India) Mahesh Bhupathi
- (India) Leander Paes
6
6

3
- (India) Mahesh Bhupathi
- (India) Leander Paes
6
6

- (United States) Richey Reneberg
- (United States) Jonathan Stark
2
3

=== Top half ===
First round

Second round

Quarterfinals

Semifinals

1
- (Netherlands) J Eltingh
- (Netherlands) P Haarhuis
6
6

WC
- (France) A Di Pasquale
- (Switzerland) M Rosset
4
0

- (Zimbabwe) B Black
- (Sweden) J Björkman
3
1

- (Zimbabwe) B Black
- (Sweden) J Björkman
6
6

1
- (Netherlands) J Eltingh
- (Netherlands) P Haarhuis
7
6

- (South Africa) P Norval
- (Zimbabwe) K Ullyett
7
7

- (South Africa) P Norval
- (Zimbabwe) K Ullyett
6
3

- (United Kingdom) N Broad
- (South Africa) R Koenig
6
6

- (South Africa) P Norval
- (Zimbabwe) K Ullyett
6
7

8
- (France) O Delaître
- (France) F Santoro
4
6

1
- (Netherlands) J Eltingh
- (Netherlands) P Haarhuis
6
4
6

4
- (The Bahamas) M Knowles
- (Canada) D Nestor
3
6
4

4
- (The Bahamas) M Knowles
- (Canada) D Nestor
6
6

WC
- (France) A Clément
- (France) S Grosjean
4
5

- (Russia) Y Kafelnikov
- (Czech Republic) D Vacek
3
1

- (Russia) Y Kafelnikov
- (Czech Republic) D Vacek
6
7

4
- (The Bahamas) M Knowles
- (Canada) D Nestor
6
6
6

- (Australia) J Eagle
- (Australia) A Florent
6
7
4

- (Sweden) N Kulti
- (Australia) D Macpherson
7
4
4

- (Sweden) N Kulti
- (Australia) D Macpherson
7
6
6

- (Sweden) N Kulti
- (Australia) D Macpherson
6
6

5
- (South Africa) E Ferreira
- (United States) R Leach
4
4

=== Bottom half ===
First round

Second round

Quarterfinals

Semifinals

6
- (Czech Republic) C Suk
- (Australia) S Stolle
7
3
7

Q
- (Germany) N Kiefer
- (Germany) D Prinosil
0
4

WC
- (France) J Golmard
- (France) G Raoux
6
6
5

WC
- (France) J Golmard
- (France) G Raoux
6
6

6
- (Czech Republic) C Suk
- (Australia) S Stolle
4
3

WC
- (France) A Dupuis
- (France) S Huet
1
2

3
- (India) M Bhupathi
- (India) L Paes
6
6

- (Canada) S Lareau
- (United States) A O'Brien
6
6

- (Canada) S Lareau
- (United States) A O'Brien
6
2

3
- (India) M Bhupathi
- (India) L Paes
7
6

3
- (India) M Bhupathi
- (India) L Paes
6
6

- (United States) R Reneberg
- (United States) J Stark
2
3

7
- (Czech Republic) M Damm
- (United States) J Grabb
6
6

- (South Africa) D Adams
- (South Africa) J-L de Jager
3
4

- (United States) R Reneberg
- (United States) J Stark
7
7

- (United States) R Reneberg
- (United States) J Stark
6
6

- (United States) R Reneberg
- (United States) J Stark
6
7

- (Zimbabwe) W Black
- (United States) D Johnson
5
6^{r}

2
- (Australia) T Woodbridge
- (Australia) M Woodforde
4
6

- (Argentina) L Lobo
- (Spain) J Sánchez
7
6

- (Argentina) L Lobo
- (Spain) J Sánchez
2
3

2
- (Australia) T Woodbridge
- (Australia) M Woodforde
6
6

== Qualifying ==
=== Qualifying seeds ===
1. (South Africa) Wayne Ferreira / (Australia) Andrew Kratzmann (first round)
2. (South Africa) Chris Haggard / (Sweden) Peter Nyborg (qualifying competition)

=== Qualifiers ===
1. (Germany) Nicolas Kiefer / (Germany) David Prinosil

=== Qualifying draw ===
First round
1	(South Africa) Wayne Ferreira (Australia) Andrew Kratzmann	1	3
(Germany) Nicolas Kiefer (Germany) David Prinosil	6	6
(United States) Mark Keil (United States) Jeff Tarango	4	4
2	(South Africa) Chris Haggard (Sweden) Peter Nyborg	6	6

Qualifying competition
(Germany) Nicolas Kiefer (Germany) David Prinosil	6	7
2	(South Africa) Chris Haggard (Sweden) Peter Nyborg	1	6
