= 1997 Paris Open – Doubles =

Doubles
- 1997 Paris Open

Final
- Champions: (Netherlands) Jacco Eltingh; (Netherlands) Paul Haarhuis
- Runners-up: (United States) Rick Leach; (United States) Jonathan Stark
- Score: 6–2, 7–6

Details
- Draw: 24
- Seeds: 8

Events
Singles	Doubles
← 1996 ·	Paris Open	· 1998 →

Jacco Eltingh and Paul Haarhuis were the defending champions and successfully defended their title, winning in the final 6–2, 7–6, against Rick Leach and Jonathan Stark.

== Seeds ==
All seeds receive a bye into the second round.

1. (Australia) Todd Woodbridge / (Australia) Mark Woodforde (second round)
2. (Netherlands) Jacco Eltingh / (Netherlands) Paul Haarhuis (champions)
3. (Russia) Yevgeny Kafelnikov / (Czech Republic) Daniel Vacek (second round)
4. (India) Mahesh Bhupathi / (India) Leander Paes (second round)
5. (South Africa) Ellis Ferreira / (United States) Patrick Galbraith (semifinals)
6. (United States) Rick Leach / (United States) Jonathan Stark (final)
7. (Sweden) Jonas Björkman / (Sweden) Nicklas Kulti (second round)
8. (The Bahamas) Mark Knowles / (Canada) Daniel Nestor (quarterfinals)

== Draw ==
=== Key ===
- Q = Qualifier
- WC = Wild card
- LL = Lucky loser
- Alt = Alternate
- ITF = ITF entry
- PR = Protected ranking
- SR = Special ranking
- SE = Special exempt
- JE = Junior exempt
- JR = Junior Accelerator Programme entrant
- CO = College Accelerator Programme entrant
- NG = Next Gen Accelerator Program entrant
- w/o = Walkover
- r = Retired
- d = Defaulted

=== Finals ===
Semifinals

Final

- (United Kingdom) Neil Broad
- (South Africa) Piet Norval
3
2

6
- (United States) Rick Leach
- (United States) Jonathan Stark
6
6

6
- (United States) Rick Leach
- (United States) Jonathan Stark
2
6

2
- (Netherlands) Jacco Eltingh
- (Netherlands) Paul Haarhuis
6
7

5
- (South Africa) Ellis Ferreira
- (United States) Patrick Galbraith
6
7
3

2
- (Netherlands) Jacco Eltingh
- (Netherlands) Paul Haarhuis
7
6
6

=== Top half ===
First round

Second round

Quarterfinals

Semifinals

1
- (Australia) T Woodbridge
- (Australia) M Woodforde
4
4

WC
- (France) J-P Fleurian
- (France) S Simian
6
4
3

- (United States) T Kronemann
- (Australia) D Macpherson
6
6

- (United States) T Kronemann
- (Australia) D Macpherson
4
6
6

- (United States) T Kronemann
- (Australia) D Macpherson
3
4

- (France) O Delaître
- (France) F Santoro
6
6
4

- (United Kingdom) N Broad
- (South Africa) P Norval
6
6

- (United Kingdom) N Broad
- (South Africa) P Norval
2
7
6

- (United Kingdom) N Broad
- (South Africa) P Norval
6
3
6

7
- (Sweden) J Björkman
- (Sweden) N Kulti
3
6
3

- (United Kingdom) N Broad
- (South Africa) P Norval
3
2

6
- (United States) R Leach
- (United States) J Stark
6
6

4
- (India) M Bhupathi
- (India) L Paes
3
4

- (Zimbabwe) B Black
- (United States) A O'Brien
4
6
3

- (Australia) J Eagle
- (Australia) P Rafter
6
6

- (Australia) J Eagle
- (Australia) P Rafter
6
3
6

- (Australia) J Eagle
- (Australia) P Rafter
4
5

- (Argentina) P Albano
- (Brazil) G Kuerten
6
2
2

6
- (United States) R Leach
- (United States) J Stark
6
7

- (United States) D Johnson
- (United States) F Montana
3
6
6

- (United States) D Johnson
- (United States) F Montana
7
3
5

6
- (United States) R Leach
- (United States) J Stark
6
6
7

=== Bottom half ===
First round

Second round

Quarterfinals

Semifinals

5
- (South Africa) E Ferreira
- (United States) P Galbraith
7
6

- (South Africa) D Adams
- (Czech Republic) C Suk
4
6
6

- (South Africa) D Adams
- (Czech Republic) C Suk
6
3

WC
- (France) R Gilbert
- (France) S Huet
6
3
4

5
- (South Africa) E Ferreira
- (United States) P Galbraith
2
6
6

- (Zimbabwe) W Black
- (United States) J Grabb
7
2
3

WC
- (France) A Clément
- (France) N Escudé
6
1
2

WC
- (France) A Clément
- (France) N Escudé
5
6
6

WC
- (France) A Clément
- (France) N Escudé
4
6
6

3
- (Russia) Y Kafelnikov
- (Czech Republic) D Vacek
6
1
1

5
- (South Africa) E Ferreira
- (United States) P Galbraith
6
7
3

2
- (Netherlands) J Eltingh
- (Netherlands) P Haarhuis
7
6
6

8
- (The Bahamas) M Knowles
- (Canada) D Nestor
6
6

Q
- (United States) J Tarango
- (Netherlands) F Wibier
6
3

- (Czech Republic) M Damm
- (Czech Republic) P Vízner
2
4

- (Czech Republic) M Damm
- (Czech Republic) P Vízner
7
6

8
- (The Bahamas) M Knowles
- (Canada) D Nestor
3
6

- (Spain) T Carbonell
- (Spain) F Roig
3
6
6

2
- (Netherlands) J Eltingh
- (Netherlands) P Haarhuis
6
7

WC
- (France) G Raoux
- (France) L Roux
6
4
3

- (Spain) T Carbonell
- (Spain) F Roig
6
3
2

2
- (Netherlands) J Eltingh
- (Netherlands) P Haarhuis
4
6
6
