= 1999 Paris Open =

- Date: 1–8 November
- Edition: 27th
- Category: ATP Super 9
- Draw: 48S / 24D
- Prize money: $2,300,000
- Surface: Carpet / indoor
- Location: Paris, France
- Venue: Palais omnisports de Paris-Bercy

Champions

Singles
- (United States) Andre Agassi

Doubles
- (Canada) Sébastien Lareau / (United States) Alex O'Brien
← 1998 ·	Paris Masters	· 2000 →

The 1999 Paris Open was a men's tennis tournament played on indoor carpet courts. It was the 27th edition of the Paris Masters, and is part of the ATP Super 9 of the 1999 ATP Tour. It took place at the Palais omnisports de Paris-Bercy in Paris, France, from 1 November through 8 November 1999. First-seeded Andre Agassi won the singles title.

== Finals ==
=== Singles ===
(United States) Andre Agassi defeated (Russia) Marat Safin 7–6^{(7–1)}, 6–2, 4–6, 6–4

- It was Andre Agassi's 5th title of the year and his 44th overall. It was his 1st Masters Series title of the year, and his 10th overall.

=== Doubles ===
(Canada) Sébastien Lareau / (United States) Alex O'Brien defeated (Netherlands) Paul Haarhuis / (United States) Jared Palmer 7–6^{(9–7)}, 7–5
