= 1998 Paris Open – Singles =

Singles
- 1998 Paris Open

Final
- Champion: (United Kingdom) Greg Rusedski
- Runner-up: (United States) Pete Sampras
- Score: 6–4, 7–6^{(7–4)}, 6–3

Details
- Draw: 48 (6 Q / 4 WC)
- Seeds: 16

Events
Singles	Doubles
← 1997 ·	Paris Open	· 1999 →

Greg Rusedski defeated the defending champion Pete Sampras in the final, 6–4, 7–6^{(7–4)}, 6–3 to win the singles tennis title at the 1998 Paris Open.

== Seeds ==
A champion seed is indicated in bold text while text in italics indicates the round in which that seed was eliminated. All sixteen seeds received a bye into the second round.

1. (United States) Pete Sampras (final)
2. (Chile) Marcelo Ríos (quarterfinals)
3. (Australia) Patrick Rafter (third round)
4. (Spain) Carlos Moyà (second round)
5. (United States) Andre Agassi (quarterfinals)
6. (Spain) Álex Corretja (second round)
7. (Slovakia) Karol Kučera (third round)
8. (Russia) Yevgeny Kafelnikov (semifinals)
9. (United Kingdom) Tim Henman (third round)
10. (Czech Republic) Petr Korda (second round)
11. (Netherlands) Richard Krajicek (second round)
12. (Sweden) Jonas Björkman (second round)
13. (United Kingdom) **Greg Rusedski (champion)**
14. (Croatia) Goran Ivanišević (second round)
15. (Netherlands) Jan Siemerink (second round)
16. (Spain) Álbert Costa (second round)

== Draw ==
=== Key ===
- Q = Qualifier
- WC = Wild card
- LL = Lucky loser
- Alt = Alternate
- SE = Special exempt
- PR = Protected ranking
- ITF = ITF entry
- JE = Junior exempt
- w/o = Walkover
- r = Retired
- d = Defaulted
- SR = Special ranking

=== Finals ===
Quarterfinals
1	**(United States) Pete Sampras**	**6**	**6**
(Australia) Mark Philippoussis	3	3
**(United States) Todd Martin**	4	**6**	**6**
5	(United States) Andre Agassi	**6**	4	4
(Sweden) Magnus Gustafsson	3	2
13	**(United Kingdom) Greg Rusedski**	**6**	**6**
8	**(Russia) Yevgeny Kafelnikov**	**6**	**6**
2	(Chile) Marcelo Ríos	3	2

Semifinals
1	(United States) **Pete Sampras**	**6**	**7^{7}**
(United States) Todd Martin	4	6^{5}
13	(United Kingdom) **Greg Rusedski**	**6**	4	**6**
8	(Russia) Yevgeny Kafelnikov	4	**6**	3

Final
1	(United States) Pete Sampras	4	6^{4}	3
13	(United Kingdom) **Greg Rusedski**	**6**	**7^{7}**	**6**

=== Top half ===
==== Section 1 ====
First round
WC	(France) S Grosjean	6^{4}	**7^{7}**	4
(Sweden) **T Johansson**	**7^{7}**	6^{3}	**6**
WC	(France) **J Golmard**	**7^{7}**	**6**
(Zimbabwe) B Black	6^{2}	4
(Czech Republic) D Vacek	6^{5}	6^{6}
(Australia) **M Philippoussis**	**7^{7}**	**7^{8}**
(France) **F Santoro**	4	**6**	**6**
(Morocco) H Arazi	**6**	4	1

Second round
1	(United States) **P Sampras**	**7^{9}**	**6**
(Sweden) T Johansson	6^{7}	1
WC	(France) **J Golmard**	3	**7**	**7**
16	(Spain) Á Costa	**6**	5	5
10	(Czech Republic) P Korda	**6**	4	4
(Australia) **M Philippoussis**	2	**6**	**6**
(France) F Santoro	2	**6**	0
7	(Slovakia) **K Kučera**	**6**	3	**6**

Third round
1	(United States) **P Sampras**	6^{4}	**6**	**6**
WC	(France) J Golmard	**7^{7}**	4	4
(Australia) **M Philippoussis**	**6**	4	**7**
7	(Slovakia) K Kučera	4	**6**	5

Quarterfinals
1	(United States) **P Sampras**	**6**	**6**
(Australia) M Philippoussis	3	3

==== Section 2 ====
First round
WC	(Germany) B Becker	**7^{7}**	5	4
(France) **N Escudé**	6^{2}	**7**	**6**
Q	(Netherlands) P Haarhuis	**7^{7}**	4	4
(United States) **T Martin**	6^{4}	**6**	**6**
Q	(Switzerland) **M Rosset**	**6**	**6**
(South Africa) W Ferreira	3	4
Q	(Italy) **G Pozzi**	**6**	**6**
(Sweden) T Enqvist	3	3

Second round
3	(Australia) **P Rafter**	**6**	**6**
(France) N Escudé	3	1
(United States) **T Martin**	4	**6**	**7^{7}**
14	(Croatia) G Ivanišević	**6**	1	6^{4}
11	(Netherlands) R Krajicek	4	**7**	5/r
Q	(Switzerland) **M Rosset**	**6**	5	**2**
Q	(Italy) G Pozzi	4	2
5	(United States) **A Agassi**	**6**	**6**

Third round
3	(Australia) P Rafter	**7**	6^{5}	6^{6}
(United States) **T Martin**	5	**7^{7}**	**7^{8}**
Q	(Switzerland) M Rosset	4	4
5	(United States) **A Agassi**	**6**	**6**

Quarterfinals
(United States) **T Martin**	4	**6**	**6**
5	(United States) A Agassi	**6**	4	4

=== Bottom half ===
==== Section 3 ====
First round
(Spain) C Costa	5	1
(Germany) **T Haas**	**7**	**6**
(United States) M Chang	4	**6**	3
(Sweden) **M Gustafsson**	**6**	3	**6**
(Germany) **N Kiefer**	**7**	**6**
Q	(Slovakia) J Krošlák	5	1
(France) G Raoux	**6**	6^{1}	4
(Australia) **J Stoltenberg**	2	**7^{7}**	**6**

Second round
6	(Spain) Á Corretja	6^{2}	**6**	3
(Germany) **T Haas**	**7^{7}**	2	**6**
(Sweden) **M Gustafsson**	**6**	**6**
12	(Sweden) J Björkman	3	2
13	(United Kingdom) **G Rusedski**	**6**	**6**
(Germany) N Kiefer	3	4
(Australia) **J Stoltenberg**	2	**6**	**6**
4	(Spain) C Moyà	**6**	2	3

Third round
(Germany) T Haas	4	2
(Sweden) **M Gustafsson**	**6**	**6**
13	(United Kingdom) **G Rusedski**	**7^{8}**	**6**
(Australia) J Stoltenberg	6^{6}	4

Quarterfinals
(Sweden) M Gustafsson	3	2
13	(United Kingdom) **G Rusedski**	**6**	**6**

==== Section 4 ====
First round
(Sweden) **M Norman**	**7^{7}**	**6**
Q	(France) A Clément	6^{5}	3
(Australia) R Fromberg	3	4
WC	(France) **A Di Pasquale**	**6**	**6**
(France) C Pioline	4	4
(United States) **V Spadea**	**6**	**6**
Q	(Australia) **T Woodbridge**	**6**	2	**7^{7}**
(Czech Republic) B Ulihrach	3	**6**	6^{3}

Second round
8	(Russia) **Y Kafelnikov**	3	**6**	**6**
(Sweden) M Norman	**6**	3	4
WC	(France) A Di Pasquale	3	3
9	(United Kingdom) **T Henman**	**6**	**6**
15	(Netherlands) J Siemerink	6^{3}	**6**	6^{4}
(United States) **V Spadea**	**7^{7}**	3	**7^{7}**
Q	(Australia) T Woodbridge	0	4
2	(Chile) **M Ríos**	**6**	**6**

Third round
8	(Russia) **Y Kafelnikov**	**6**	6^{5}	**7^{7}**
9	(United Kingdom) T Henman	3	**7^{7}**	6^{2}
(United States) V Spadea	5	4
2	(Chile) **M Ríos**	**7**	**6**

Quarterfinals
8	(Russia) **Y Kafelnikov**	**6**	**6**
2	(Chile) M Ríos	3	2
