= Chris Haggard =

South African tennis player (born 1971)

- Country (sports): South Africa
- Residence: Austin, Texas, United States
- Born: 28 April 1971 (age 55) Pretoria, South Africa
- Height: 1.78 m (5 ft 10 in)
- Turned pro: 1993
- Plays: Left-handed
- College: Auburn University-Montgomery
- Prize money: $1,196,035

Singles
- Career record: 1–2
- Career titles: 0; 0 Challenger, 0 Futures
- Highest ranking: No. 223 (17 June 1996)

Grand Slam singles results
- Australian Open: Q3 (1994)
- French Open: Q1 (1996, 1997)
- Wimbledon: Q3 (1996)
- US Open: Q2 (1996, 1997)

Doubles
- Career record: 239–304
- Career titles: 6; 7 Challenger, 2 Futures
- Highest ranking: No. 19 (8 September 2003)

Grand Slam doubles results
- Australian Open: SF (2003)
- French Open: 2R (2000, 2003, 2007)
- Wimbledon: QF (2001)
- US Open: 3R (1999, 2003, 2006)

Other doubles tournaments
- Tour Finals: RR (2001)

Team competitions
- Davis Cup: 3–2
- Last updated on: 21 May 2023.

Chris Haggard (born 28 April 1971) is a former professional tennis player from South Africa.

After finishing runner-up in the NAIA national men's tennis championship singles draw in 1991 while playing for Auburn University-Montgomery, Haggard turned pro in 1993. He won six ATP Tour doubles titles and finished runner-up a further 12 times. He reached his career-high doubles ranking of world No. 19 in September 2003.

Haggard played Team Tennis for the Delaware Smash until January 2009.

== Performance Timelines ==
Key
W	F	SF	QF	#R	RR	Q#	P#	DNQ	A	Z#	PO	G	S	B	NMS	NTI	P	NH

(W) winner; (F) finalist; (SF) semifinalist; (QF) quarterfinalist; (#R) rounds 4, 3, 2, 1; (RR) round-robin stage; (Q#) qualification round; (P#) preliminary round; (DNQ) did not qualify; (A) absent; (Z#) Davis/Fed Cup Zonal Group (with number indication) or (PO) play-off; (G) gold, (S) silver or (B) bronze Olympic/Paralympic medal; (NMS) not a Masters tournament; (NTI) not a Tier I tournament; (P) postponed; (NH) not held; (SR) strike rate (events won / competed); (W–L) win–loss record.

=== Doubles ===
Tournament	1995	1996	1997	1998	1999	2000	2001	2002	2003	2004	2005	2006	2007	2008	2009	SR	W–L	Win %
Grand Slam tournaments
Australian Open	A	A	A	2R	2R	QF	3R	1R	SF	2R	2R	2R	2R	2R	1R	0 / 12	16–12	57%
French Open	A	A	A	1R	1R	2R	1R	1R	2R	1R	1R	1R	2R	1R	A	0 / 11	3–11	21%
Wimbledon	Q1	Q2	3R	3R	2R	1R	QF	2R	1R	1R	2R	1R	1R	1R	A	0 / 12	10–12	45%
US Open	A	Q1	Q2	2R	3R	2R	1R	1R	3R	1R	A	3R	2R	1R	A	0 / 10	9–10	47%
Win–loss	0–0	0–0	2–1	4–4	4–4	5–4	5–4	1–4	7–4	1–4	2–3	3–4	3–4	1–4	0–1	0 / 45	38–45	46%
Year-End Championships
ATP Finals	Did Not Qualify						RR	Did Not Qualify								0 / 1	0–3	0%
ATP Masters 1000 Series
Indian Wells	A	A	A	A	2R	1R	1R	1R	A	1R	A	1R	2R	A	A	0 / 7	2–7	22%
Miami	A	A	A	2R	2R	1R	3R	QF	1R	1R	A	QF	1R	A	A	0 / 9	9–9	50%
Monte Carlo	A	A	A	A	2R	1R	A	A	2R	1R	A	2R	A	A	A	0 / 5	3–5	38%
Hamburg	A	A	A	A	1R	1R	1R	A	1R	2R	A	2R	A	A	NMS	0 / 6	2–6	25%
Rome	A	A	A	A	2R	A	1R	1R	2R	A	A	A	A	A	A	0 / 4	2–4	33%
Canada	A	A	A	A	A	1R	1R	1R	1R	QF	A	1R	A	A	A	0 / 6	2–6	25%
Cincinnati	A	A	A	A	1R	2R	1R	A	2R	1R	A	1R	A	A	A	0 / 6	2–6	25%
Stuttgart	A	A	A	1R	Q1	A	A	Not Masters Series								0 / 1	0–1	0%
Madrid	Not Masters Series							A	1R	A	A	A	A	A	A	0 / 1	0–1	0%
Paris	A	A	A	Q2	1R	2R	A	1R	QF	A	A	A	A	A	A	0 / 4	2–4	33%
Win–loss	0–0	0–0	0–0	1–2	4–7	2–7	2–6	3–5	4–8	3–6	0–0	4–6	1–2	0–0	0–0	0 / 49	24–49	33%

=== Doubles: 18 (6 titles, 12 runner-ups) ===
Legend Grand Slam Tournaments (0–0) ATP World Tour Finals (0–0) ATP Masters Series (0–0) ATP Championship Series (3–2) ATP World Series (3–10)	Finals by surface Hard (4–9) Clay (2–2) Grass (0–1) Carpet (0–0)	Finals by setting Outdoors (5–10) Indoors (1–2)

Result	W–L	Date	Tournament	Tier	Surface	Partner	Opponents	Score
Loss	0–1	Aug 1998	Boston, United States	World Series	Hard	(United States) Jack Waite	(Netherlands) Jacco Eltingh (Netherlands) Paul Haarhuis	3–6, 2–6
Loss	0–2	Nov 1998	Stockholm, Sweden	International Series	Hard	(Sweden) Peter Nyborg	(Sweden) Nicklas Kulti (Sweden) Mikael Tillström	5–7, 6–3, 5–7
Win	1–2	Aug 1999	Kitzbühel, Austria	Championship Series	Clay	(Sweden) Peter Nyborg	(Spain) Álex Calatrava (Serbia and Montenegro) Dušan Vemić	6–3, 6–7^{(4–7)}, 7–6^{(7–4)}
Win	2–2	Jul 2002	Amersfoort, Netherlands	International Series	Clay	(South Africa) Jeff Coetzee	(Brazil) André Sá (Brazil) Alexandre Simoni	7–6^{(7–1)}, 6–3
Win	3–2	Oct 2002	Tokyo, Japan	Championship Series	Hard	(South Africa) Jeff Coetzee	(United States) Jan-Michael Gambill (United States) Graydon Oliver	7–6^{(7–4)}, 6–4
Win	4–2	Jan 2003	Adelaide, Australia	International Series	Hard	(South Africa) Jeff Coetzee	(Belarus) Max Mirnyi (United States) Jeff Morrison	2–6, 6–4, 7–6^{(9–7)}
Loss	4–3	Apr 2003	Barcelona, Spain	Championship Series	Clay	(South Africa) Robbie Koenig	(United States) Bob Bryan (United States) Mike Bryan	4–6, 3–6
Loss	4–4	Jul 2003	Amersfoort, Netherlands	International Series	Clay	(Brazil) André Sá	(United States) Devin Bowen (Australia) Ashley Fisher	0–6, 4–6
Loss	4–5	Aug 2003	Washington, United States	International Series	Hard	(Australia) Paul Hanley	(Russia) Yevgeny Kafelnikov (Armenia) Sargis Sargsian	5–7, 6–4, 2–6
Loss	4–6	Feb 2004	Memphis, United States	Championship Series	Hard	(South Africa) Jeff Coetzee	(United States) Bob Bryan (United States) Mike Bryan	3–6, 4–6
Loss	4–7	Mar 2004	Scottsdale, United States	International Series	Hard	(South Africa) Jeff Coetzee	(United States) Rick Leach (United States) Brian MacPhie	3–6, 1–6
Win	5–7	Aug 2004	Washington, United States	International Series	Hard	(South Africa) Robbie Koenig	(United States) Travis Parrott (Russia) Dmitry Tursunov	7–6^{(7–3)}, 6–1
Loss	5–8	Feb 2006	Delray Beach, United States	International Series	Hard	(South Africa) Wesley Moodie	(The Bahamas) Mark Knowles (Canada) Daniel Nestor	2–6, 3–6
Win	6–8	Feb 2006	Memphis, United States	Championship Series	Hard	(Croatia) Ivo Karlović	(United States) James Blake (United States) Mardy Fish	0–6, 7–5, [10–5]
Loss	6–9	Jun 2006	Rosmalen, Netherlands	International Series	Grass	(France) Arnaud Clément	(Czech Republic) Martin Damm (India) Leander Paes	1–6, 6–7^{(3–7)}
Loss	6–10	Jan 2007	Auckland, New Zealand	International Series	Hard	(Sweden) Simon Aspelin	(South Africa) Jeff Coetzee (Netherlands) Rogier Wassen	7–6^{(13–11)}, 3–6, [2–10]
Loss	6–11	Feb 2007	San Jose, United States	International Series	Hard	(Germany) Rainer Schüttler	(United States) Eric Butorac (United Kingdom) Jamie Murray	5–7, 6–7^{(6–8)}
Loss	6–12	Sep 2007	Beijing, China	International Series	Hard	(Chinese Taipei) Lu Yen-hsun	(South Africa) Rik de Voest (Australia) Ashley Fisher	7–6^{(7–3)}, 0–6, [6–10]

== ATP Challenger and ITF Futures finals ==
=== Singles: 2 (0–2) ===
Legend ATP Challenger (0–1) ITF Futures (0–1)	Finals by surface Hard (0–1) Clay (0–0) Grass (0–0) Carpet (0–1)

Result	W–L	Date	Tournament	Tier	Surface	Opponent	Score
Loss	0–1	May 1996	Jerusalem, Israel	Challenger	Hard	(South Africa) Grant Stafford	4–6, 3–6
Loss	0–2	Feb 1998	Great Britain F3, Eastbourne	Futures	Carpet	(Sweden) Kalle Flygt	3–6, 2–6

=== Doubles: 19 (9–10) ===
Legend ATP Challenger (7–8) ITF Futures (2–2)	Finals by surface Hard (6–6) Clay (2–4) Grass (0–0) Carpet (1–0)

Result	W–L	Date	Tournament	Tier	Surface	Partner	Opponents	Score
Loss	0–1	Aug 1996	Bronx, United States	Challenger	Hard	(United Kingdom) Chris Wilkinson	(United States) David DiLucia (United States) Scott Humphries	4–6, 1–6
Win	1–1	Aug 1997	Istanbul, Turkey	Challenger	Hard	(United Kingdom) Mark Petchey	(Portugal) João Cunha-Silva (France) Jean-Philippe Fleurian	walkover
Loss	1–2	Sep 1997	Edinburgh, United Kingdom	Challenger	Clay	(Australia) James Holmes	(Australia) Wayne Arthurs (Australia) Grant Doyle	6–4, 2–6, 2–6
Win	2–2	Nov 1997	Aachen, Germany	Challenger	Hard	(South Africa) John-Laffnie de Jager	(United States) Dave Randall (United States) Jack Waite	3–6, 6–1, 7–6
Win	3–2	Nov 1997	Neumünster, Germany	Challenger	Carpet	(South Africa) John-Laffnie de Jager	(Germany) Lars Burgsmüller (Germany) Markus Hantschk	6–3, 6–1
Win	4–2	Nov 1997	Ixtapa, Mexico	Challenger	Hard	(Venezuela) Maurice Ruah	(Mexico) Bernardo Martínez (Netherlands) Rogier Wassen	6–4, 7–6
Win	5–2	May 1998	Budspest, Hungary	Challenger	Clay	(South Africa) Paul Rosner	(Argentina) Diego del Río (Australia) Grant Silcock	6–4, 6–2
Loss	5–3	Aug 2005	San Marino, San Marino	Challenger	Clay	(South Africa) Jeff Coetzee	(Czech Republic) Lukáš Dlouhý (Czech Republic) David Škoch	6–3, 4–6, 3–6
Win	6–3	Nov 2005	Bratislava, Slovakia	Challenger	Hard	(Switzerland) Jean-Claude Scherrer	(Slovakia) Dominik Hrbatý (Slovakia) Michal Mertiňák	6–3, 2–6, 7–6^{(8–6)}
Loss	6–4	Nov 2007	Bratislava, Slovakia	Challenger	Hard	(Germany) Mischa Zverev	(Czech Republic) Tomáš Cibulec (Czech Republic) Jaroslav Levinský	4–6, 6–2, [8–10]
Loss	6–5	Nov 2007	Dnipropetrovsk, Ukraine	Challenger	Hard	(India) Rohan Bopanna	(Germany) Christopher Kas (Croatia) Lovro Zovko	6–7^{(5–7)}, 2–6
Loss	6–6	Apr 2008	Paget, Bernuda	Challenger	Clay	(Australia) Peter Luczak	(Israel) Harel Levy (United States) Jim Thomas	7–6^{(7–4)}, 4–6, [9–11]
Loss	6–7	Jun 2008	Prostějov, Czech Repubkic	Challenger	Clay	(France) Nicolas Tourte	(South Africa) Rik de Voest (Poland) Łukasz Kubot	2–6, 2–6
Win	7–7	Nov 2008	Kolding, Denmark	Challenger	Hard	(United States) Brendan Evans	(United Kingdom) James Auckland (Australia) Todd Perry	6–3, 7–5
Loss	7–8	Mar 2009	Bergamo, Italy	Challenger	Hard	(Czech Republic) Pavel Vízner	(Slovakia) Karol Beck (Czech Republic) Jaroslav Levinský	6–7^{(6–8)}, 4–6
Win	8–8	Oct 2010	USA F26, Austin	Futures	Hard	(United States) Conor Pollock	(South Africa) Jean Andersen (United States) Joshua Zavala	6–3, 6–2
Win	9–8	May 2011	USA F12, Tampa	Futures	Clay	(Australia) Ashley Fisher	(Brazil) Clayton Almeida (United States) Joshua Zavala	7–6^{(7–1)}, 6–4
Loss	9–9	Nov 2015	South Africa F1, Stellenbosch	Futures	Hard	(United States) Tyler Hochwalt	(Austria) Pascal Brunner (Austria) Lucas Miedler	3–6, 2–6
Loss	9–10	Nov 2016	South Africa F1, Stellenbosch	Futures	Hard	(South Africa) Nicolaas Scholtz	(Italy) Alessandro Bega (Switzerland) Luca Margaroli	5–7, 2–6
