= Jeff Tarango =

American tennis player (born 1968)

- Full name: Jeffrey Gail Tarango
- Country (sports): United States
- Residence: Manhattan Beach, California, United States
- Born: November 20, 1968 (age 57) Manhattan Beach, California, United States
- Height: 5 ft 11 in (1.80 m)
- Turned pro: 1989
- Retired: 2010
- Plays: Left-handed (two-handed backhand)
- Prize money: $3,730,289

Singles
- Career record: 239–294
- Career titles: 2
- Highest ranking: No. 42 (2 November 1992)

Grand Slam singles results
- Australian Open: 3R (1997, 1999)
- French Open: 3R (1993, 1996)
- Wimbledon: 3R (1995)
- US Open: 3R (1989, 1996, 1997)

Other tournaments
- Olympic Games: 2R (2000)

Doubles
- Career record: 253–247
- Career titles: 14
- Highest ranking: No. 10 (18 October 1999)

Grand Slam doubles results
- Australian Open: 3R (1996, 2001, 2002)
- French Open: F (1999)
- Wimbledon: 3R (1997, 2001)
- US Open: 3R (1996, 1997, 2000)

Grand Slam mixed doubles results
- Australian Open: QF (2000, 2002)
- French Open: QF (2000)
- Wimbledon: QF (1998)
- US Open: QF (1997)
- Last updated on: 12 October 2021.

Jeffrey Gail Tarango (born November 20, 1968) is a retired American tennis player. He was a top-ten doubles player and a runner-up at the 1999 French Open men's doubles tournament. He is now the Director of Tennis at the Jack Kramer Club, which is just south of Los Angeles. In 2018, he was the tournament director of a $30,000 men's California championships.

Tarango now resides in Manhattan Beach, California with his wife and children. He is married to Jessica Balgrosky, and they have five children (Nina Rose, Katherine, Jackson, Ace, and Jesse).

== Career ==
=== Pro tour ===
Tarango turned professional in 1989 after completing his junior year at Stanford University, where he won two NCAA team titles. During his career, he won two top-level singles titles and 14 doubles titles. Tarango reached two Super 9 quarterfinals, Rome in 1995 and Miami in 1998. His career-high world rankings were No. 42 in singles and No. 10 in doubles. He was runner-up in the men's doubles at the 1999 French Open, partnering with Goran Ivanišević.

=== Wimbledon 1995 default ===
In the third round of the 1995 Wimbledon Championships, trailing 6–7, 1–3 to Alexander Mronz, Tarango became infuriated with French umpire Bruno Rebeuh, who had ruled against Tarango several times. During the match, when preparing to serve, the crowd heckled Tarango and he responded "Oh, shut up!" Rebeuh immediately issued a code violation to Tarango on the grounds of audible obscenity. Tarango protested this violation, called for the tournament referee, and asked for Rebeuh to be removed. Tarango was instructed to continue to play. He then accused Rebeuh of being "one of the most corrupt officials in the game" – to this Rebeuh gave Tarango another code violation, this time for verbal abuse. Tarango took umbrage, packed his rackets and stormed off the court. To add to the controversy, Tarango's wife at the time then slapped Rebeuh in the face.

Tarango was fined US$65,500, suspended for three weeks, and banned from two Grand Slam tournaments by the ATP and ITF, though the fine was later reduced to US$28,256 after he apologized to Rebeuh.

Tarango was also the beneficiary of a default in the men's doubles tournament earlier at the same championship. He and partner Henrik Holm were at two sets to one down against the team of Jeremy Bates and Tim Henman when Henman angrily smashed a ball that inadvertently hit ball girl Caroline Hall, resulting in their disqualification. Coincidentally, Hall was also a ball girl in Tarango's match against Mronz.

=== After retirement ===
Tarango retired from the main tour in 2003 and now devotes his time to coaching as well as broadcasting for BBC, ESPN, Tennis Channel, Fox Sports and DirecTV. He has been a member of the Davis Cup Committee for six years within the USTA. He still makes occasional appearances at professional events, including the 2008 USA F21 Futures event in Milwaukee.

In his 2009 autobiography Open, Andre Agassi claimed that Tarango cheated in a juniors tournament in 1977 to hand Agassi his first competitive loss. During the final set tiebreaker, Tarango purposely mis-called a ball that had landed several feet in: "Players act as their own linesman… Tarango has decided he'd rather do this than lose and he knows there's nothing anyone can do about it. He raises his hand in victory. Now I start to cry." In an earlier interview, Tarango instead claimed that Agassi had been overruled by an umpire on match point.

Tarango coached several players after retirement, including Younes El Aynaoui, Andrei Medvedev, Maria Sharapova, and Vince Spadea.

== ATP career finals ==
=== Singles: 6 (2 titles, 4 runner-ups) ===
Legend Grand Slam Tournaments (0–0) ATP World Tour Finals (0–0) ATP World Tour Masters 1000 (0–0) ATP World Tour 500 Series (0–0) ATP World Tour 250 Series (2–4)	Finals by surface Hard (2–3) Clay (0–1) Grass (0–0) Carpet (0–0)	Finals by setting Outdoors (2–3) Indoors (0–1)

Result	W–L	Date	Tournament	Tier	Surface	Opponent	Score
Loss	0–1	Aug 1988	Livingston, United States	Grand Prix	Hard	(United States) Andre Agassi	2–6, 4–6
Loss	0–2	Apr 1991	Seoul, South Korea	World Series	Hard	(Germany) Patrick Baur	4–6, 6–1, 6–7
Win	1–2	Jan 1992	Wellington, New Zealand	World Series	Hard	(Soviet Union) Alexander Volkov	6–1, 6–0, 6–3
Win	2–2	Oct 1992	Tel Aviv, Israel	World Series	Hard	(France) Stéphane Simian	4–6, 6–3, 6–4
Loss	2–3	Sep 1994	Bordeaux, France	World Series	Hard	(South Africa) Wayne Ferreira	0–6, 5–7
Loss	2–4	Aug 1999	Umag, Croatia	World Series	Clay	(Sweden) Magnus Norman	2–6, 4–6

=== Doubles: 25 (14 titles, 11 runners-up) ===
Legend Grand Slam tournaments (0–1) ATP World Tour Finals (0–0) ATP Masters Series (0–1) ATP Championship Series (2–2) ATP World Series (12–7)	Finals by surface Hard (6–6) Clay (6–4) Grass (0–0) Carpet (2–1)	Finals by setting Outdoor (10–9) Indoor (4–2)

Result	W–L	Date	Tournament	Tier	Surface	Partner	Opponents	Score
Loss	0–1	Jun 1994	St. Polten, Austria	World Series	Clay	(Malaysia) Adam Malik	(Czech Republic) Vojtěch Flégl (Australia) Andrew Florent	6–3, 1–6, 4–6
Win	1–1	Apr 1995	Seoul, South Korea	World Series	Hard	(Canada) Sébastien Lareau	(Australia) Andrew Florent (Australia) Joshua Eagle	6–3, 6–2
Win	2–1	Jul 1995	Washington, United States	Championship Series	Hard	(France) Olivier Delaître	(Czech Republic) Petr Korda (Czech Republic) Cyril Suk	4–6, 6–3, 6–2
Win	3–1	Sep 1995	Bucharest, Romania	World Series	Clay	(United States) Mark Keil	(Czech Republic) Daniel Vacek (Czech Republic) Cyril Suk	6–4, 7–6
Win	4–1	Jul 1996	Båstad, Sweden	World Series	Clay	(Sweden) David Ekerot	(Australia) Joshua Eagle (Sweden) Peter Nyborg	6–4, 3–6, 6–4
Win	5–1	Sep 1996	Bucharest, Romania	World Series	Clay	(Sweden) David Ekerot	(South Africa) David Adams (Netherlands) Menno Oosting	7–6, 7–6
Loss	5–2	Jan 1998	Auckland, New Zealand	World Series	Hard	(Netherlands) Tom Nijssen	(United States) Patrick Galbraith (New Zealand) Brett Steven	4–6, 2–6
Loss	5–3	Aug 1998	Los Angeles, United States	World Series	Hard	(Czech Republic) Daniel Vacek	(Australia) Patrick Rafter (Australia) Sandon Stolle	4–6, 4–6
Win	6–3	Nov 1998	Moscow, Russia	World Series	Carpet	(United States) Jared Palmer	(Czech Republic) Daniel Vacek (Russia) Yevgeny Kafelnikov	6–4, 6–7, 6–3
Win	7–3	Jan 1999	Auckland, New Zealand	World Series	Hard	(Czech Republic) Daniel Vacek	(Czech Republic) Jiří Novák (Czech Republic) David Rikl	7–5, 7–5
Win	8–3	Feb 1999	St. Petersburg, Russia	World Series	Carpet	(Czech Republic) Daniel Vacek	(Romania) Andrei Pavel (Netherlands) Menno Oosting	3–6, 6–3, 7–5
Win	9–3	Apr 1999	Tokyo, Japan	Championship Series	Hard	(Czech Republic) Daniel Vacek	(United States) Brian Macphie (Zimbabwe) Wayne Black	4–3 ret.
Loss	9–4	Jun 1999	French Open, France	Grand Slam	Clay	(Croatia) Goran Ivanišević	(India) Mahesh Bhupathi (India) Leander Paes	2–6, 5–7
Win	10–4	Jul 1999	Båstad, Sweden	World Series	Clay	(South Africa) David Adams	(Sweden) Mikael Tillström (Sweden) Nicklas Kulti	7–6, 6–4
Win	11–4	Sep 1999	Bournemouth, United Kingdom	World Series	Clay	(South Africa) David Adams	(Germany) Michael Kohlmann (Sweden) Nicklas Kulti	6–3, 6–7, 7–6
Win	12–4	Oct 1999	Toulouse, France	World Series	Hard	(France) Olivier Delaître	(South Africa) David Adams (South Africa) John-Laffnie de Jager	3–6, 7–6, 6–4
Loss	12–5	Jan 2000	Auckland, New Zealand	World Series	Hard	(France) Olivier Delaître	(South Africa) Ellis Ferreira (United States) Rick Leach	5–7, 4–6
Loss	12–6	Oct 2000	Tokyo, Japan	Championship Series	Hard	(Australia) Michael Hill	(India) Mahesh Bhupathi (India) Leander Paes	4–6, 7–6^{(7–1)}, 3–6
Win	13–6	Nov 2000	Brighton, United Kingdom	World Series	Hard	(Australia) Michael Hill	(United States) Paul Goldstein (United States) Jim Thomas	6–3, 7–5
Loss	13–7	Feb 2001	Marseilles, France	World Series	Hard	(Australia) Michael Hill	(France) Julien Boutter (France) Fabrice Santoro	6–7^{(7–9)}, 5–7
Win	14–7	Apr 2001	Casablanca, Morocco	World Series	Clay	(Australia) Michael Hill	(Argentina) Pablo Albano (Australia) David Macpherson	7–6^{(7–2)}, 6–3
Loss	14–8	Jul 2001	Gstaad, Switzerland	World Series	Clay	(Australia) Michael Hill	(Switzerland) Roger Federer (Russia) Marat Safin	1–0 ret.
Loss	14–9	Jul 2001	Stuttgart, Germany	Championship Series	Clay	(Australia) Michael Hill	(Argentina) Guillermo Cañas (Germany) Rainer Schüttler	6–4, 6–7^{(1–7)}, 4–6
Loss	14–10	Oct 2001	Moscow, Russia	International Series	Carpet	(India) Mahesh Bhupathi	(Belarus) Max Mirnyi (Australia) Sandon Stolle	3–6, 0–6
Loss	14–11	Oct 2001	Stuttgart, Germany	Masters Series	Hard	(South Africa) Ellis Ferreira	(Belarus) Max Mirnyi (Australia) Sandon Stolle	6–7^{(1–7)}, 6–7^{(4–7)}

== ATP Challenger and ITF Futures finals ==
=== Singles: 6 (3–3) ===
Legend ATP Challenger (3–3) ITF Futures (0–0)	Finals by surface Hard (0–3) Clay (3–0) Grass (0–0) Carpet (0–0)

Result	W–L	Date	Tournament	Tier	Surface	Opponent	Score
Win	1–0	Jun 1990	Furth, Germany	Challenger	Clay	(Chile) Felipe Rivera	6–0, 6–0
Loss	1–1	Sep 1993	Azores, Portugal	Challenger	Hard	(France) Rodolphe Gilbert	1–6, 7–5, 4–6
Loss	1–2	Oct 1993	Reunion, Reunion Island	Challenger	Hard	(Haiti) Ronald Agénor	3–6, 4–6
Loss	1–3	Nov 1995	Nantes, France	Challenger	Hard	(France) Guillaume Raoux	2–6, 5–7
Win	2–3	Aug 1997	Poznań, Poland	Challenger	Clay	(Czech Republic) David Rikl	7–5, 6–3
Win	3–3	Jul 1999	Newcastle, United Kingdom	Challenger	Clay	(Haiti) Ronald Agénor	3–6, 6–0, 7–6

=== Doubles: 7 (4–3) ===
Legend ATP Challenger (3–3) ITF Futures (1–0)	Finals by surface Hard (2–2) Clay (2–1) Grass (0–0) Carpet (0–0)

Result	W–L	Date	Tournament	Tier	Surface	Partner	Opponents	Score
Loss	0–1	Sep 1993	Azores, Portugal	Challenger	Hard	(United Kingdom) Chris Bailey	(United States) Bryan Shelton (The Bahamas) Roger Smith	4–6, 4–6
Win	1–1	Oct 1993	Réunion, Réunion Island	Challenger	Hard	(United States) Jonathan Canter	(South Africa) Mark Kaplan (South Africa) Lan Bale	6–4, 3–6, 7–5
Loss	1–2	Jun 1995	Košice, Slovakia	Challenger	Clay	(Romania) Adrian Voinea	(Czech Republic) Jiří Novák (Czech Republic) David Rikl	6–7, 2–6
Win	2–2	Jun 1996	Košice, Slovakia	Challenger	Clay	(France) Olivier Delaître	(Czech Republic) Jan Kodeš Jr. (Czech Republic) Petr Pála	7–6, 6–3
Win	3–2	Jun 2000	Braunschweig, Germany	Challenger	Clay	(Germany) Jens Knippschild	(Spain) Álex López Morón (Spain) Albert Portas	6–2, 6–2
Loss	3–3	Feb 2003	Andrezieux, France	Challenger	Hard	(Australia) Stephen Huss	(Czech Republic) David Škoch (Croatia) Lovro Zovko	6–7^{(4–7)}, 6–0, 3–6
Win	4–3	Aug 2008	USA F21, Milwaukee	Futures	Hard	(United States) Edward Kelly	(South Africa) Raven Klaasen (United States) Ryan Young	6–3, 3–6. [11–9]

== Performance timelines ==
Key
W	F	SF	QF	#R	RR	Q#	DNQ	A	NH

(W) winner; (F) finalist; (SF) semifinalist; (QF) quarterfinalist; (#R) rounds 4, 3, 2, 1; (RR) round-robin stage; (Q#) qualification round; (DNQ) did not qualify; (A) absent; (NH) not held; (SR) strike rate (events won / competed); (W–L) win–loss record.

=== Singles ===
Tournament	1987	1988	1989	1990	1991	1992	1993	1994	1995	1996	1997	1998	1999	2000	2001	SR	W–L	Win %
Grand Slam tournaments
Australian Open	A	A	2R	Q3	1R	2R	1R	1R	1R	2R	3R	1R	3R	1R	1R	0 / 12	7–12	37%
French Open	A	A	A	A	1R	2R	3R	2R	1R	3R	2R	2R	1R	1R	Q1	0 / 10	8–10	44%
Wimbledon	A	A	1R	1R	1R	1R	1R	1R	3R	A	1R	2R	2R	2R	A	0 / 11	5–11	31%
US Open	1R	1R	3R	1R	2R	2R	1R	2R	1R	3R	3R	1R	1R	1R	A	0 / 14	9–14	39%
Win–loss	0–1	0–1	3–3	0–2	1–4	3–4	2–4	2–4	2–4	5–3	5–4	2–4	3–4	1–4	0–1	0 / 47	29–47	38%
Olympic Games
Summer Olympics	NH	A	Not Held			A	Not Held			A	Not Held			2R	NH	0 / 1	1–1	50%
ATP Tour Masters 1000
Indian Wells Masters	A	A	A	A	A	A	1R	Q3	A	A	2R	A	A	A	1R	0 / 3	1–3	25%
Miami Open	A	A	A	3R	2R	1R	3R	2R	1R	A	2R	QF	1R	1R	Q2	0 / 10	11–10	52%
Stuttgart	NH	A	A	A	A	A	A	A	A	A	1R	Q1	A	A	A	0 / 1	0–1	0%
Monte Carlo	A	A	A	A	A	A	A	A	A	A	A	1R	A	A	A	0 / 1	0–1	0%
Rome	A	A	A	A	A	1R	A	A	QF	A	1R	1R	Q1	1R	Q1	0 / 5	3–5	38%
Hamburg	A	A	A	A	A	A	A	A	A	A	2R	A	A	1R	A	0 / 2	1–2	33%
Canada Masters	A	A	2R	1R	2R	2R	2R	1R	2R	A	A	1R	A	1R	A	0 / 9	5–9	36%
Cincinnati Masters	A	A	A	A	A	1R	2R	A	A	A	A	2R	A	1R	Q2	0 / 4	2–4	33%
Paris Masters	A	A	A	A	A	1R	Q3	Q3	Q2	Q1	1R	Q1	Q1	A	A	0 / 2	0–2	0%
Win–loss	0–0	0–0	1–1	2–2	2–2	1–5	4–4	1–2	4–3	0–0	3–6	5–5	0–1	0–5	0–1	0 / 37	23–37	38%

=== Doubles ===
Tournament	1987	1988	1989	1990	1991	1992	1993	1994	1995	1996	1997	1998	1999	2000	2001	2002	2003	SR	W–L	Win %
Grand Slam tournaments
Australian Open	A	A	A	A	A	A	A	A	1R	3R	1R	1R	2R	1R	3R	3R	1R	0 / 9	7–9	44%
French Open	A	A	A	A	A	A	A	A	2R	2R	1R	2R	F	1R	SF	1R	1R	0 / 9	11–9	55%
Wimbledon	A	A	A	A	A	A	A	A	2R	A	3R	2R	2R	2R	3R	2R	2R	0 / 8	10–8	56%
US Open	1R	A	A	A	A	A	A	2R	1R	3R	3R	1R	1R	3R	1R	2R	1R	0 / 11	8–11	42%
Win–loss	0–1	0–0	0–0	0–0	0–0	0–0	0–0	1–1	2–4	5–3	4–4	2–4	7–4	3–4	7–4	4–4	1–4	0 / 37	36–37	49%
ATP Tour Masters 1000
Indian Wells Masters	A	A	A	A	A	A	A	A	A	A	1R	1R	A	1R	QF	1R	A	0 / 5	2–5	29%
Miami Open	A	A	A	A	A	A	A	A	A	A	1R	1R	3R	2R	3R	2R	A	0 / 6	3–6	33%
Stuttgart	NH	A	A	A	A	A	A	A	A	A	Q1	A	1R	A	F	A	A	0 / 2	4–2	67%
Monte Carlo	A	A	A	A	A	A	A	A	A	A	A	1R	QF	1R	2R	1R	A	0 / 5	2–5	29%
Rome	A	A	A	A	A	A	A	A	QF	A	QF	1R	QF	1R	1R	1R	A	0 / 7	6–7	46%
Hamburg	A	A	A	A	A	A	A	A	A	A	1R	A	A	1R	1R	1R	A	0 / 4	0–4	0%
Canada Masters	A	A	1R	A	A	A	A	QF	QF	A	A	1R	A	1R	QF	QF	A	0 / 7	8–7	53%
Cincinnati Masters	A	A	A	A	A	A	A	A	A	A	A	1R	A	2R	SF	1R	A	0 / 4	4–4	50%
Paris Masters	A	A	A	A	A	A	A	A	2R	A	Q2	Q1	1R	QF	2R	A	A	0 / 4	4–4	50%
Win–loss	0–0	0–0	0–1	0–0	0–0	0–0	0–0	2–1	5–3	0–0	2–4	0–6	5–5	3–8	14–9	2–7	0–0	0 / 44	33–44	43%

=== Mixed doubles ===
Tournament	1995	1996	1997	1998	1999	2000	2001	2002	2003	SR	W–L	Win %
Grand Slam tournaments
Australian Open	A	1R	A	A	2R	QF	1R	QF	A	0 / 5	5–5	50%
French Open	A	A	2R	A	A	QF	1R	2R	A	0 / 4	3–4	43%
Wimbledon	A	A	A	QF	A	A	3R	1R	2R	0 / 4	6–4	60%
US Open	2R	A	QF	A	A	A	2R	2R	1R	0 / 5	5–5	50%
Win–loss	1–1	0–1	2–2	3–1	1–1	4–2	3–4	4–4	1–2	0 / 18	19–18	51%

== Junior Grand Slam finals ==
=== Doubles: 1 (1 runner-up) ===
Result	Year	Tournament	Surface	Partner	Opponents	Score
Loss	1986	US Open	Hard	(United States) David Wheaton	(Spain) Tomás Carbonell (Spain) Javier Sánchez	4–6, 6–1, 1–6
