= Jack Waite =

American tennis player

- Country (sports): United States
- Residence: Waukesha, Wisconsin, U.S.
- Born: May 1, 1969 (age 56) Madison, Wisconsin, U.S.
- Height: 6 ft 1 in (1.85 m)
- Turned pro: 1993
- Retired: 2003
- Plays: Right-handed
- Prize money: $597,013

Singles
- Career record: 41–30
- Career titles: 0
- Highest ranking: No. 410 (June 21, 1993)

Doubles
- Career record: 323–309
- Career titles: 3
- Highest ranking: No. 44 (September 8, 1997)

Grand Slam doubles results
- Australian Open: R2 (1997, 1998, 1999, 2000, 2001)
- French Open: R2 (2001)
- Wimbledon: R2 (1997, 2000)
- US Open: R3 (1997)

Jack Waite (born May 1, 1969) is an American former tennis player.

Waite won 3 doubles titles during his professional career. The right-hander reached his highest doubles ATP ranking in September 1997, when he became no. 44 in the world.

== Career finals ==
=== Doubles (3 wins, 8 losses) ===
Result	W/L	Date	Tournament	Surface	Partner	Opponents	Score
Win	1–0	Oct 1994	Palermo, Italy	Clay	(Netherlands) Tom Kempers	(United Kingdom) Neil Broad (United States) Greg Van Emburgh	7–6, 6–4
Loss	1–1	Oct 1995	Valencia, Spain	Clay	(Netherlands) Tom Kempers	(Spain) Tomás Carbonell (Spain) Francisco Roig	5–7, 3–6
Win	2–1	Jan 1996	Auckland, New Zealand	Hard	(South Africa) Marcos Ondruska	(Sweden) Jonas Björkman (New Zealand) Brett Steven	W/O
Loss	2–2	Aug 1996	Amsterdam, Netherlands	Clay	(Sweden) Rikard Bergh	(United States) Donald Johnson (United States) Francisco Montana	4–6, 6–3, 2–6
Win	3–2	Oct 1996	Marbella, Spain	Clay	(Australia) Andrew Kratzmann	(Argentina) Pablo Albano (Argentina) Lucas Arnold Ker	6–7, 6–3, 6–4
Loss	3–3	Jun 1997	Bologna, Italy	Clay	(United States) Dave Randall	(Brazil) Gustavo Kuerten (Brazil) Fernando Meligeni	2–6, 5–7
Loss	3–4	Aug 1997	Boston, U.S.	Hard	(United States) Dave Randall	(Netherlands) Jacco Eltingh (Netherlands) Paul Haarhuis	4–6, 2–6
Loss	3–5	Aug 1998	Boston, U.S.	Hard	(South Africa) Chris Haggard	(Netherlands) Jacco Eltingh (Netherlands) Paul Haarhuis	3–6, 2–6
Loss	3–6	Jul 1999	Stuttgart Outdoor, Germany	Clay	(North Macedonia) Aleksandar Kitinov	(Brazil) Jaime Oncins (Argentina) Daniel Orsanic	2–6, 1–6
Loss	3–7	Jul 2000	San Marino	Clay	(Argentina) Gastón Etlis	(Czech Republic) Tomáš Cibulec (Czech Republic) Leoš Friedl	6–7, 5–7
Loss	3–8	Nov 2000	Lyon, France	Carpet	(Croatia) Ivan Ljubičić	(Netherlands) Paul Haarhuis (Australia) Sandon Stolle	1–6, 7–6, 6–7
