= Jacco Eltingh =

Dutch tennis player

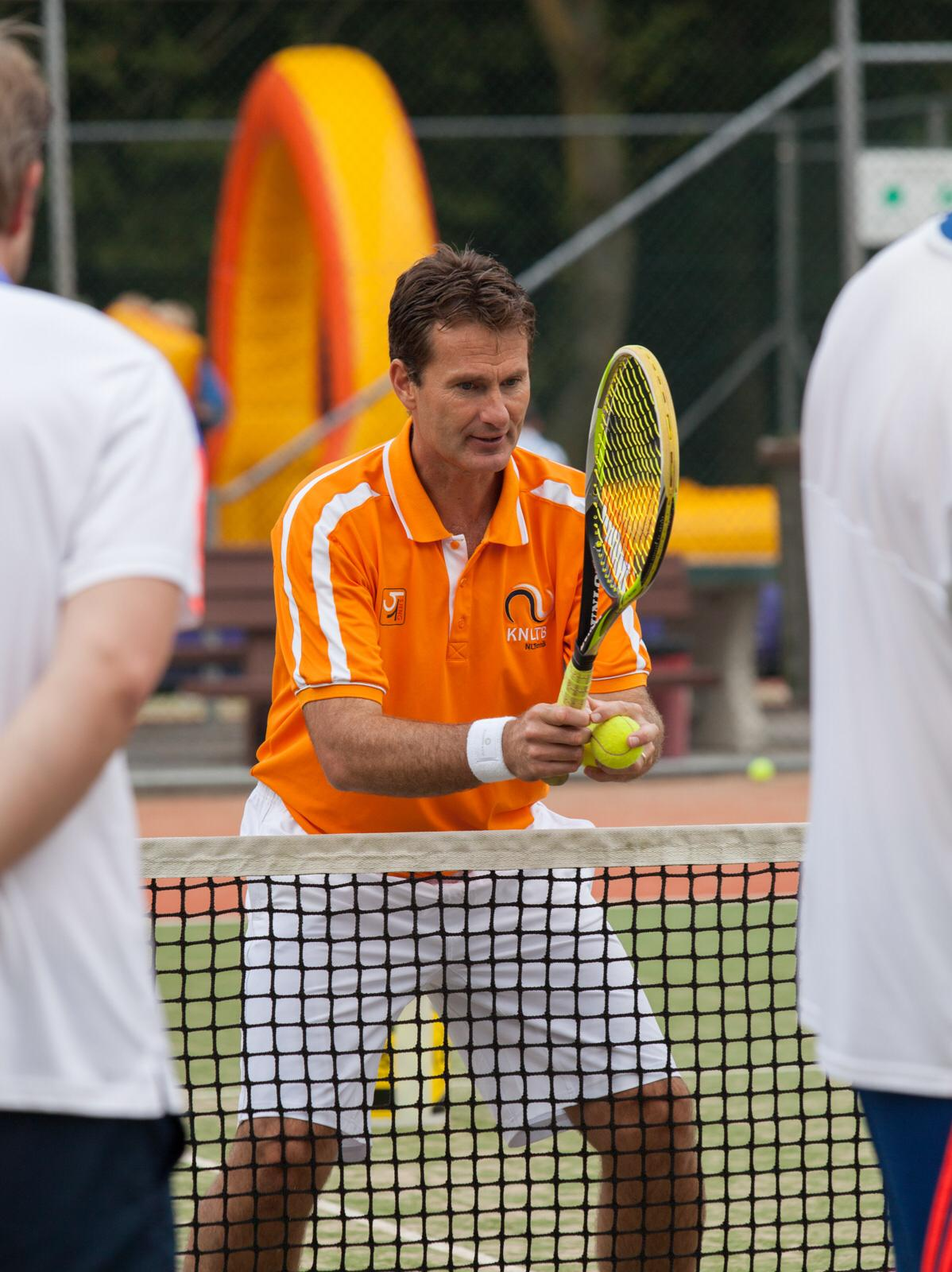
- Country (sports): Netherlands
- Residence: Monte Carlo, Monaco
- Born: 29 August 1970 (age 55) Heerde, Netherlands
- Height: 1.88 m (6 ft 2 in)
- Turned pro: 1988
- Retired: 1998 (last match in 2011)
- Plays: Right-handed (one-handed backhand)
- Coach: Alex Reynders
- Prize money: $4,920,410

Singles
- Career record: 127–147
- Career titles: 4
- Highest ranking: No. 19 (6 February 1995)

Grand Slam singles results
- Australian Open: QF (1995)
- French Open: 4R (1994)
- Wimbledon: QF (1995)
- US Open: 2R (1993, 1995)

Other tournaments
- Grand Slam Cup: QF (1995)
- Olympic Games: 1R (1996)

Doubles
- Career record: 391–145
- Career titles: 44
- Highest ranking: No. 1 (16 January 1995)

Grand Slam doubles results
- Australian Open: W (1994, 1998)
- French Open: W (1995, 1998)
- Wimbledon: W (1998)
- US Open: W (1994)

Other doubles tournaments
- Tour Finals: W (1993, 1998)
- Olympic Games: SF – 4th (1996)

Grand Slam mixed doubles results
- Australian Open: QF (1997)
- French Open: 2R (1992)
- Wimbledon: F (1992)
- US Open: 1R (1992)

Jacco Folkert Eltingh (Dutch pronunciation: [ˈjɑkoː ˈɛltɪŋ]; born 29 August 1970) is a former professional male tennis player and former world No. 1 doubles player from the Netherlands.

He is best known for his success in doubles with fellow countryman Paul Haarhuis. Together they won all four Grand Slam doubles titles at least once. Eltingh is the youngest player in the Open Era to achieve the career Grand Slam in men's doubles.

Eltingh reached his career-high singles ranking in February 1995, when he climbed to world No. 19, notably reaching the quarterfinals of both the Australian Open and Wimbledon in 1995. In his professional career he has won four singles and 44 doubles titles.

In November 2005, Eltingh was elected to the ATP Board as the player representative for Europe.

== Major finals ==
=== Grand Slam finals ===
==== Doubles: 8 (6–2) ====
Result	Year	Championship	Partner	Opponents	Score
Win	1994	Australian Open	(Netherlands) Paul Haarhuis	(Zimbabwe) Byron Black (United States) Jonathan Stark	6–7^{(3–7)}, 6–3, 6–4, 6–3
Win	1994	US Open	(Netherlands) Paul Haarhuis	(Australia) Todd Woodbridge (Australia) Mark Woodforde	6–3, 7–6^{(7–1)}
Win	1995	French Open	(Netherlands) Paul Haarhuis	(Sweden) Nicklas Kulti (Sweden) Magnus Larsson	6–7^{(3–7)}, 6–4, 6–1
Loss	1996	US Open	(Netherlands) Paul Haarhuis	(Australia) Todd Woodbridge (Australia) Mark Woodforde	6–4, 6–7^{(5–7)}, 6–7^{(5–7)}
Loss	1997	Wimbledon	(Netherlands) Paul Haarhuis	(Australia) Todd Woodbridge (Australia) Mark Woodforde	6–7^{(4–7)}, 6–7^{(7–9)}, 7–5, 3–6
Win	1998	Australian Open (2)	(Sweden) Jonas Björkman	(Australia) Todd Woodbridge (Australia) Mark Woodforde	6–2, 5–7, 2–6, 6–4, 6–3
Win	1998	French Open (2)	(Netherlands) Paul Haarhuis	(The Bahamas) Mark Knowles (Canada) Daniel Nestor	6–3, 3–6, 6–3
Win	1998	Wimbledon	(Netherlands) Paul Haarhuis	(Australia) Todd Woodbridge (Australia) Mark Woodforde	2–6, 6–4, 7–6^{(7–3)}, 5–7, 10–8

==== Mixed doubles: 1 (0–1) ====
Result	Year	Championship	Partner	Opponents	Score
Loss	1992	Wimbledon	(Netherlands) Miriam Oremans	(Czech Republic) Cyril Suk (Latvia) Larisa Neiland	6–7^{(2–7)}, 2–6

=== Olympic finals ===
==== Doubles: 1 (0–1) ====
Outcome	Year	Championship	Surface	Partner	Opponents	Score
4th place	1996	Atlanta	Hard	(Netherlands) Paul Haarhuis	(Germany) Marc-Kevin Goellner (Germany) David Prinosil	2–6, 5–7

== ATP career finals ==
=== Singles: 4 (4 titles) ===
Legend Grand Slam Tournaments (0–0) ATP World Tour Finals (0–0) ATP Masters Series (0–0) ATP Championship Series (0–0) ATP World Series (4–0)	Finals by surface Hard (1–0) Clay (1–0) Grass (1–0) Carpet (1–0)	Finals by setting Outdoors (3–0) Indoors (1–0)

Result	W–L	Date	Tournament	Tier	Surface	Opponent	Score
Win	1–0	Jun 1992	Manchester, United Kingdom	World Series	Grass	(United States) MaliVai Washington	6–3, 6–4
Win	2–0	May 1993	Atlanta, United States	World Series	Clay	(United States) Bryan Shelton	7–6^{(7–1)}, 6–2
Win	3–0	Aug 1994	Schenectady, United States	World Series	Hard	(United States) Chuck Adams	6–3, 6–4
Win	4–0	Oct 1994	Kuala Lumpur, Malaysia	World Series	Carpet	(Russia) Andrei Olhovskiy	7–6^{(7–1)}, 2–6, 6–4

=== Doubles: 60 (44 titles, 16 runner-ups) ===
Legend Grand Slam Tournaments (6–2) ATP World Tour Finals (2–1) ATP Masters Series (8–3) ATP Championship Series (5–4) ATP World Series (23–6)	Finals by surface Hard (18–8) Clay (10–2) Grass (3–1) Carpet (13–6)	Finals by setting Outdoors (23–9) Indoors (21–7)

Result	W–L	Date	Tournament	Tier	Surface	Partner	Opponents	Score
Win	1–0	Sep 1991	Palermo, Italy	World Series	Clay	(Netherlands) Tom Kempers	(Spain) Emilio Sánchez (Spain) Javier Sánchez	3–6, 6–3, 6–3
Win	2–0	Oct 1991	Athens, Greece	World Series	Clay	(Netherlands) Mark Koevermans	(Netherlands) Menno Oosting (Finland) Olli Rahnasto	5–7, 7–6, 7–5
Win	3–0	Oct 1991	Guarujá, Brazil	World Series	Hard	(Netherlands) Paul Haarhuis	(United States) Bret Garnett (United States) Todd Nelson	6–3, 7–5
Win	4–0	Nov 1991	Birmingham, United Kingdom	World Series	Carpet	(Kenya) Paul Wekesa	(Sweden) Ronnie Båthman (Sweden) Rikard Bergh	7–5, 7–5
Win	5–0	Aug 1992	Schenectady, United States	World Series	Hard	(Netherlands) Paul Haarhuis	(Spain) Sergio Casal (Spain) Emilio Sánchez	6–3, 6–4
Win	6–0	Jan 1993	Kuala Lumpur, Malaysia	World Series	Hard	(Netherlands) Paul Haarhuis	(Sweden) Henrik Holm (Norway) Bent-Ove Pedersen	7–5, 6–3
Loss	6–1	Jan 1993	Jakarta, Indonesia	World Series	Hard	(Netherlands) Paul Haarhuis	(Italy) Diego Nargiso (France) Guillaume Raoux	6–7, 7–6, 3–6
Win	7–1	Feb 1993	San Francisco, United States	World Series	Hard	(United States) Scott Davis	(United States) Patrick McEnroe (United States) Jonathan Stark	6–1, 4–6, 7–5
Loss	7–2	Feb 1993	Memphis, United States	Championship Series	Hard	(Netherlands) Paul Haarhuis	(Australia) Todd Woodbridge (Australia) Mark Woodforde	5–7, 2–6
Win	8–2	May 1993	Rome, United States	Masters Series	Clay	(Netherlands) Paul Haarhuis	(South Africa) Wayne Ferreira (Australia) Mark Kratzmann	6–4, 7–6
Win	9–2	Aug 1993	Hilversum, Netherlands	World Series	Clay	(Netherlands) Paul Haarhuis	(Netherlands) Hendrik Jan Davids (Belgium) Libor Pimek	4–6, 6–2, 7–5
Win	10–2	Oct 1993	Kuala Lumpur, Malaysia	World Series	Hard	(Netherlands) Paul Haarhuis	(Sweden) Jonas Björkman (Sweden) Lars-Anders Wahlgren	7–5, 4–6, 7–6
Loss	10–3	Oct 1993	Beijing, China	World Series	Carpet	(Netherlands) Paul Haarhuis	(United States) Paul Annacone (United States) Doug Flach	6–7, 3–6
Win	11–3	Nov 1993	Moscow, Russia	World Series	Carpet	(Netherlands) Paul Haarhuis	(Sweden) Jonas Björkman (Sweden) Jan Apell	6–1, ret.
Win	12–3	Nov 1993	Johannesburg, South Africa	ATP Finals	Hard	(Netherlands) Paul Haarhuis	(Australia) Todd Woodbridge (Australia) Mark Woodforde	7–6^{(7–4)}, 7–6^{(7–5)}, 6–4
Win	13–3	Jan 1994	Melbourne, Australia	Grand Slam	Hard	(Netherlands) Paul Haarhuis	(Zimbabwe) Byron Black (United States) Jonathan Stark	6–7^{(3–7)}, 6–3, 6–4, 6–3
Win	14–3	Feb 1994	Philadelphia, United States	Championship Series	Carpet	(Netherlands) Paul Haarhuis	(United States) Jim Grabb (United States) Jared Palmer	6–3, 6–4
Loss	14–4	Feb 1994	Rotterdam, Netherlands	World Series	Carpet	(Netherlands) Paul Haarhuis	(United Kingdom) Jeremy Bates (Sweden) Jonas Björkman	4–6, 1–6
Win	15–4	Mar 1994	Miami, United States	Masters Series	Hard	(Netherlands) Paul Haarhuis	(The Bahamas) Mark Knowles (United States) Jared Palmer	7–6, 7–6
Loss	15–5	Jul 1994	Stuttgart, Germany	Championship Series	Clay	(Netherlands) Paul Haarhuis	(United States) Scott Melville (South Africa) Piet Norval	6–7, 5–7
Loss	15–6	Aug 1994	New Haven, United States	Championship Series	Hard	(Netherlands) Paul Haarhuis	(Canada) Grant Connell (United States) Patrick Galbraith	4–6, 6–7
Loss	15–7	Aug 1994	Schenectady, United States	World Series	Hard	(Netherlands) Paul Haarhuis	(Sweden) Jan Apell (Sweden) Jonas Björkman	4–6, 6–7
Win	16–7	Sep 1994	New York, United States	Grand Slam	Hard	(Netherlands) Paul Haarhuis	(Australia) Todd Woodbridge (Australia) Mark Woodforde	6–3, 7–6
Win	17–7	Oct 1994	Kuala Lumpur, Malaysia	World Series	Carpet	(Netherlands) Paul Haarhuis	(Sweden) Nicklas Kulti (Sweden) Lars-Anders Wahlgren	6–0, 7–5
Win	18–7	Oct 1994	Sydney, Australia	Championship Series	Hard	(Netherlands) Paul Haarhuis	(Zimbabwe) Byron Black (United States) Jonathan Stark	6–4, 7–6
Win	19–7	Nov 1994	Paris, France	Masters Series	Carpet	(Netherlands) Paul Haarhuis	(Zimbabwe) Byron Black (United States) Jonathan Stark	3–6, 7–6, 7–5
Win	20–7	Nov 1994	Moscow, Russia	World Series	Carpet	(Netherlands) Paul Haarhuis	(South Africa) David Adams (Russia) Andrei Olhovskiy	walkover
Loss	20–8	Feb 1995	Philadelphia, United States	Championship Series	Carpet	(Netherlands) Paul Haarhuis	(United States) Jim Grabb (United States) Jonathan Stark	6–7, 7–6, 3–6
Win	21–8	May 1995	Monte Carlo, Monaco	Masters Series	Clay	(Netherlands) Paul Haarhuis	(Argentina) Luis Lobo (Spain) Javier Sánchez	6–3, 6–4
Win	22–8	Jun 1995	Paris, France	Grand Slam	Clay	(Netherlands) Paul Haarhuis	(Sweden) Nicklas Kulti (Sweden) Magnus Larsson	6–7, 6–4, 6–1
Win	23–8	Jun 1995	Halle, Germany	World Series	Grass	(Netherlands) Paul Haarhuis	(Russia) Yevgeny Kafelnikov (Russia) Andrei Olhovskiy	6–2, 3–6, 6–3
Win	24–8	Oct 1995	Tokyo, Japan	Championship Series	Carpet	(Netherlands) Paul Haarhuis	(Switzerland) Jakob Hlasek (United States) Patrick McEnroe	7–6, 6–4
Win	25–8	Oct 1995	Essen, Germany	Masters Series	Carpet	(Netherlands) Paul Haarhuis	(Argentina) Cyril Suk (Czech Republic) Daniel Vacek	7–5, 6–4
Win	26–8	Nov 1995	Stockholm, Sweden	International Series	Hard	(Netherlands) Paul Haarhuis	(Canada) Grant Connell (United States) Patrick Galbraith	3–6, 6–2, 7–6
Loss	26–9	Nov 1995	Eindhoven, Netherlands	ATP Finals	Carpet	(Netherlands) Paul Haarhuis	(Canada) Grant Connell (United States) Patrick Galbraith	6–7^{(6–8)}, 6–7^{(6–8)}, 6–3, 6–7^{(2–7)}
Loss	26–10	Jan 1996	Doha, Qatar	International Series	Hard	(Netherlands) Paul Haarhuis	(The Bahamas) Mark Knowles (Canada) Daniel Nestor	6–7, 3–6
Loss	26–11	Sep 1996	New York, United States	Grand Slam	Hard	(Netherlands) Paul Haarhuis	(United States) Todd Woodbridge (United States) Mark Woodforde	6–4, 6–7, 6–7
Win	27–11	Oct 1996	Toulouse, France	International Series	Hard	(Netherlands) Paul Haarhuis	(France) Olivier Delaître (France) Guillaume Raoux	6–3, 7–5
Loss	27–12	Oct 1996	Stuttgart, Germany	Masters Series	Hard	(Netherlands) Paul Haarhuis	(Canada) Sébastien Lareau (United States) Alex O'Brien	6–3, 4–6, 3–6
Win	28–12	Nov 1996	Paris, France	Masters Series	Carpet	(Netherlands) Paul Haarhuis	(Russia) Yevgeny Kafelnikov (Czech Republic) Daniel Vacek	6–4, 4–6, 7–6
Win	29–12	Jan 1997	Doha, Qatar	International Series	Hard	(Netherlands) Paul Haarhuis	(Sweden) Patrik Fredriksson (Sweden) Magnus Norman	6–3, 6–2
Win	30–12	Mar 1997	Rotterdam, Netherlands	World Series	Carpet	(Netherlands) Paul Haarhuis	(Belgium) Libor Pimek (South Africa) Byron Talbot	7–6, 6–4
Loss	30–13	Apr 1997	Monte Carlo, Monaco	Masters Series	Clay	(Netherlands) Paul Haarhuis	(United States) Donald Johnson (United States) Francisco Montana	6–7, 6–2, 6–7
Win	31–13	Jun 1997	Rosmalen, Netherlands	World Series	Grass	(Netherlands) Paul Haarhuis	(United States) Trevor Kronemann (Australia) David Macpherson	6–4, 7–5
Loss	31–14	Jul 1997	Wimbledon, United Kingdom	Grand Slam	Grass	(Netherlands) Paul Haarhuis	(United States) Todd Woodbridge (United States) Mark Woodforde	6–7, 6–7, 7–5, 3–6
Win	32–14	Aug 1997	Boston, United States	World Series	Hard	(Netherlands) Paul Haarhuis	(United States) Dave Randall (United States) Jack Waite	6–4, 6–2
Win	33–14	Oct 1997	Toulouse, France	World Series	Hard	(Netherlands) Paul Haarhuis	(France) Jean-Philippe Fleurian (Belarus) Max Mirnyi	6–3, 7–6
Win	34–14	Nov 1997	Paris, France	Masters Series	Carpet	(Netherlands) Paul Haarhuis	(United States) Rick Leach (United States) Jonathan Stark	6–2, 7–6
Loss	34–15	Jan 1998	Sydney, Australia	International Series	Hard	(Canada) Daniel Nestor	(Australia) Todd Woodbridge (Australia) Mark Woodforde	3–6, 5–7
Win	35–15	Feb 1998	Melbourne, Australia	Grand Slam	Hard	(Sweden) Jonas Björkman	(Australia) Todd Woodbridge (Australia) Mark Woodforde	6–2, 5–7, 2–6, 6–4, 6–3
Win	36–15	Mar 1998	Philadelphia, United States	Championship Series	Hard	(Netherlands) Paul Haarhuis	(United States) Richey Reneberg (Australia) David Macpherson	7–6, 6–7, 6–2
Win	37–15	Mar 1998	Rotterdam, Netherlands	World Series	Carpet	(Netherlands) Paul Haarhuis	(United Kingdom) Neil Broad (South Africa) Piet Norval	7–6, 6–3
Win	38–15	Apr 1998	Barcelona, Spain	Championship Series	Clay	(Netherlands) Paul Haarhuis	(South Africa) Ellis Ferreira (United States) Rick Leach	7–5, 6–0
Win	39–15	Apr 1998	Monte Carlo, Monaco	Masters Series	Clay	(Netherlands) Paul Haarhuis	(Australia) Todd Woodbridge (Australia) Mark Woodforde	6–4, 6–2
Win	40–15	Jun 1998	Paris, France	Grand Slam	Clay	(Netherlands) Paul Haarhuis	(The Bahamas) Mark Knowles (Canada) Daniel Nestor	6–3, 3–6, 6–3
Win	41–15	Jul 1998	Wimbledon, United Kingdom	Grand Slam	Grass	(Netherlands) Paul Haarhuis	(United States) Todd Woodbridge (United States) Mark Woodforde	2–6, 6–4, 7–6, 5–7, 10–8
Win	42–15	Aug 1998	Amsterdam, Netherlands	International Series	Clay	(Netherlands) Paul Haarhuis	(Slovakia) Dominik Hrbatý (Slovakia) Karol Kučera	6–3, 6–2
Win	43–15	Aug 1998	Boston, United States	World Series	Hard	(Netherlands) Paul Haarhuis	(South Africa) Chris Haggard (United States) Jack Waite	6–3, 6–3
Loss	43–16	Nov 1998	Paris, France	Masters Series	Carpet	(Netherlands) Paul Haarhuis	(India) Mahesh Bhupathi (India) Leander Paes	4–6, 2–6
Win	44–16	Nov 1998	Hartford, United States	ATP Finals	Carpet	(Netherlands) Paul Haarhuis	(The Bahamas) Mark Knowles (Canada) Daniel Nestor	6–4, 6–2, 7–5

== ATP Challenger and ITF Futures finals ==
=== Singles: 2 (0–2) ===
Legend ATP Challenger (0–2) ITF Futures (0–0)	Finals by surface Hard (0–1) Clay (0–1) Grass (0–0) Carpet (0–0)

Result	W–L	Date	Tournament	Tier	Surface	Opponent	Score
Loss	0–1	Sep 1990	Verona, Italy	Challenger	Clay	(Netherlands) Richard Krajicek	4–6, 4–6
Loss	0–2	Oct 1991	Cairo, Egypt	Challenger	Hard	(United States) Bryan Shelton	6–7, 6–7

=== Doubles: 6 (3–3) ===
Legend ATP Challenger (3–3) ITF Futures (0–0)	Finals by surface Hard (2–1) Clay (1–2) Grass (0–0) Carpet (0–0)

Result	W–L	Date	Tournament	Tier	Surface	Partner	Opponents	Score
Loss	0–1	Feb 1989	Lagos, Nigeria	Challenger	Hard	(Netherlands) Paul Haarhuis	(Venezuela) Alfonso Gonzalez-Mora (United States) James Schor	6–4, 6–7, 2–6
Loss	0–2	Sep 1990	Verona, Italy	Challenger	Clay	(Netherlands) Menno Oosting	(Czech Republic) Slava Doseděl (Ukraine) Dimitri Poliakov	0–6, 7–6, 4–6
Win	1–2	Oct 1990	Curitiba, Brazil	Challenger	Hard	(Netherlands) Hendrik-Jan Davids	(Brazil) Cesar Kist (Brazil) Danilo Marcelino	6–4, 3–6, 6–3
Win	2–2	Oct 1990	Ilheus, Brazil	Challenger	Hard	(Netherlands) Hendrik-Jan Davids	(The Bahamas) Roger Smith (Sweden) Tobias Svantesson	4–6, 6–3, 6–4
Win	3–2	Feb 1992	Jakarta, Indonesia	Challenger	Clay	(Netherlands) Tom Kempers	(Netherlands) Mark Koevermans (Mexico) Leonardo Lavalle	walkover
Loss	3–3	Jul 1993	Scheveningen, Netherlands	Challenger	Clay	(Netherlands) Paul Haarhuis	(Sweden) Nils Holm (Sweden) Lars-Anders Wahlgren	1–6, 2–6

== Performance timelines ==
Key
W	F	SF	QF	#R	RR	Q#	DNQ	A	NH

(W) winner; (F) finalist; (SF) semifinalist; (QF) quarterfinalist; (#R) rounds 4, 3, 2, 1; (RR) round-robin stage; (Q#) qualification round; (DNQ) did not qualify; (A) absent; (NH) not held; (SR) strike rate (events won / competed); (W–L) win–loss record.

=== Singles ===
Tournament	1990	1991	1992	1993	1994	1995	1996	1997	SR	W–L	Win %
Grand Slam tournaments
Australian Open	A	3R	2R	2R	2R	QF	1R	1R	0 / 7	9–7	56%
French Open	A	1R	1R	1R	4R	3R	A	A	0 / 5	5–5	50%
Wimbledon	Q1	4R	1R	2R	2R	QF	1R	A	0 / 6	9–6	60%
US Open	A	1R	1R	2R	1R	2R	Q3	A	0 / 5	2–5	29%
Win–loss	0–0	5–4	1–4	3–4	5–4	11–4	0–2	0–1	0 / 23	25–23	52%
Year End Championships
Grand Slam Cup	Did not qualify					QF	DNQ		0 / 1	1–1	50%
National Representation
Summer Olympics	NH		A	Not Held			1R	NH	0 / 1	0–1	0%
ATP Masters Series
Miami	A	A	A	1R	2R	2R	1R	A	0 / 4	1–4	20%
Monte Carlo	A	A	A	A	A	1R	A	A	0 / 1	0–1	0%
Rome	A	A	A	1R	QF	2R	A	A	0 / 3	4–3	57%
Hamburg	A	A	A	A	QF	3R	A	A	0 / 2	5–2	71%
Cincinnati	A	A	A	1R	A	A	1R	A	0 / 2	0–2	0%
Paris	A	A	A	A	2R	2R	A	A	0 / 2	2–2	50%
Win–loss	0–0	0–0	0–0	0–3	8–4	4–5	0–2	0–0	0 / 14	12–14	46%

=== Doubles ===
Tournament	1990	1991	1992	1993	1994	1995	1996	1997	1998	SR	W–L	Win %
Grand Slam tournaments
Australian Open	A	1R	2R	3R	W	SF	3R	SF	W	2 / 8	25–6	81%
French Open	A	3R	2R	3R	QF	W	A	SF	W	2 / 7	24–5	83%
Wimbledon	Q1	A	3R	1R	QF	QF	1R	F	W	1 / 7	19–6	76%
US Open	A	3R	QF	2R	W	3R	F	2R	A	1 / 7	20–6	77%
Win–loss	0–0	4–3	7–4	5–4	18–2	15–3	7–3	14–4	18–0	6 / 29	88–23	79%
Year-end Championships
ATP Finals	Did not qualify			W	SF	F	RR	SF	W	2 / 6	20–6	77%
National Representation
Summer Olympics	NH		A	Not Held			SF	NH		0 / 2	3–2	60%
ATP Masters Series
Indian Wells	A	A	A	A	A	A	QF	2R	A	0 / 2	1–2	33%
Miami	A	A	A	QF	W	QF	A	3R	A	1 / 4	10–3	77%
Monte Carlo	A	A	A	A	A	W	A	F	W	2 / 3	11–1	92%
Hamburg	A	A	A	A	SF	SF	A	QF	A	0 / 3	5–3	63%
Rome	A	A	A	W	2R	1R	A	2R	A	1 / 4	7–3	70%
Canada	A	A	A	A	A	A	A	1R	A	0 / 1	0–1	0%
Cincinnati	A	A	A	1R	A	A	1R	2R	A	0 / 3	1–3	25%
Paris	A	A	1R	SF	W	QF	W	W	F	3 / 7	18–4	82%
Win–loss	0–0	0–0	0–1	9–3	12–2	9–4	5–2	11–7	7–1	7 / 27	53–20	73%
