= 1994 French Open – Men's singles qualifying =

Men's singles qualifying
- 1994 French Open

Events
Singles	men	women		boys	girls
Doubles	men	women	mixed	boys	girls
WC Singles	men	women	quad
WC Doubles	men	women	quad
Legends	−45	45+	women

Qualification
Singles	men	women
- French Open

Players who neither had high enough rankings nor received wild cards to enter the main draw of the annual French Open Tennis Championships participated in a qualifying tournament held in the week before the event.

== Seeds ==
1. (Argentina) Gabriel Markus (qualified)
2. (Austria) Horst Skoff (first round)
3. (Germany) Jörn Renzenbrink (qualified)
4. (Morocco) Karim Alami (second round)
5. (United Kingdom) Jeremy Bates (second round)
6. (South Africa) Marcos Ondruska (qualified)
7. (Sweden) Lars Jonsson (qualified)
8. (United Kingdom) Mark Petchey (second round)
9. (United States) Robbie Weiss (first round)
10. (Spain) Albert Costa (qualified)
11. (Italy) Diego Nargiso (first round)
12. (Sweden) Christian Bergström (second round)
13. (Germany) David Prinosil (qualifying competition, lucky loser)
14. (Ukraine) Dimitri Poliakov (qualified)
15. (Sweden) Tomas Nydahl (first round)
16. (United States) Doug Flach (first round)
17. (Italy) Cristiano Caratti (qualified)
18. (Argentina) Patricio Arnold (qualifying competition, lucky loser)
19. (Norway) Christian Ruud (qualified)
20. (Australia) Brent Larkham (qualifying competition, lucky loser)
21. (Spain) Federico Sánchez (second round)
22. (Australia) Michael Tebbutt (second round)
23. (Australia) Sandon Stolle (second round)
24. (Brazil) Roberto Jabali (first round)
25. (Argentina) Daniel Orsanic (second round)
26. (Australia) Todd Woodbridge (first round)
27. (Brazil) Jaime Oncins (qualifying competition)
28. (Australia) Neil Borwick (first round)
29. (Australia) Simon Youl (qualifying competition)
30. (United States) Michael Joyce (first round)
31. (South Africa) Mark Kaplan (first round)
32. (United Kingdom) Tim Henman (first round)

== Qualifiers ==
1. (Argentina) Gabriel Markus
2. (Czech Republic) Radomír Vašek
3. (Germany) Jörn Renzenbrink
4. (Romania) Adrian Voinea
5. (Australia) Joshua Eagle
6. (South Africa) Marcos Ondruska
7. (Sweden) Lars Jonsson
8. (United States) Martin Blackman
9. (Argentina) Agustín Garizzio
10. (Spain) Albert Costa
11. (Sweden) Mikael Tillström
12. (Sweden) Lars-Anders Wahlgren
13. (Norway) Christian Ruud
14. (Ukraine) Dimitri Poliakov
15. (Italy) Cristiano Caratti
16. (Chile) Marcelo Ríos

== Lucky losers ==
1. (Australia) Brent Larkham
2. (Argentina) Patricio Arnold
3. (Germany) David Prinosil

== Qualifying draw ==
Key

- Q = Qualifier
- WC = Wild card
- LL = Lucky loser
- Alt = Alternate
- ITF = ITF entry
- PR = Protected ranking
- SR = Special ranking
- SE = Special exempt
- JE = Junior exempt
- JR = Junior Accelerator Programme entrant
- CO = College Accelerator Programme entrant
- NG = Next Gen Accelerator Program entrant
- w/o = Walkover
- r = Retired
- d = Defaulted

=== First qualifier ===
First round
1	(Argentina) Gabriel Markus	7	6
(Finland) Tuomas Ketola	6	1
(Italy) Claudio Pistolesi	6	6
(Spain) Francisco Roig	3	3
(France) Frederic Vitoux	7	6
(Australia) Paul Kilderry	6	2
(United Kingdom) Andrew Foster	6	7
31	(South Africa) Mark Kaplan	4	6

Second round
1	(Argentina) Gabriel Markus	6	6
(Italy) Claudio Pistolesi	0	2
(France) Frederic Vitoux	7	4	6
(United Kingdom) Andrew Foster	6	6	3

Qualifying competition
1	(Argentina) Gabriel Markus	6	6
(France) Frederic Vitoux	0	1

=== Second qualifier ===
First round
2	(Austria) Horst Skoff	4	2
(Argentina) Martin Stringari	6	6
(Spain) Óscar Martínez	6	3	0
(Czech Republic) Radomír Vašek	3	6	6
(United States) David Witt	6	7
(South Africa) David Nainkin	0	6
(Australia) Wayne Arthurs	6	7
32	(United Kingdom) Tim Henman	4	6

Second round
(Argentina) Martin Stringari	1	1
(Czech Republic) Radomír Vašek	6	6
(United States) David Witt	6	6
(Australia) Wayne Arthurs	3	4

Qualifying competition
(Czech Republic) Radomír Vašek	6	6
(United States) David Witt	3	4

=== Third qualifier ===
First round
3	(Germany) Jörn Renzenbrink	6	7
(Czech Republic) Jaroslav Bulant	3	5
(Italy) Filippo Messori	4	3
(United States) Chris Garner	6	6
(United Kingdom) Miles Maclagan	1	4
(South Africa) Marius Barnard	6	6
(Spain) Roberto Carretero	4	3
29	(Australia) Simon Youl	6	6

Second round
3	(Germany) Jörn Renzenbrink	7	7
(United States) Chris Garner	5	5
(South Africa) Marius Barnard	0	2
29	(Australia) Simon Youl	6	6

Qualifying competition
3	(Germany) Jörn Renzenbrink	7	6
29	(Australia) Simon Youl	6	0

=== Fourth qualifier ===
First round
4	(Morocco) Karim Alami	6	6
(Morocco) Hicham Arazi	3	2
(United States) Tommy Ho	5	5
(Spain) Alex Lopez-Moron	7	7
(United States) Brian Devening	2	1
(Romania) Adrian Voinea	6	6
WC	(France) Bertrand Lemercier	6	0	6
30	(United States) Michael Joyce	4	6	1

Second round
4	(Morocco) Karim Alami	1	6	2
(Spain) Alex Lopez-Moron	6	2	6
(Romania) Adrian Voinea	7	6
WC	(France) Bertrand Lemercier	5	2

Qualifying competition
(Spain) Alex Lopez-Moron	1	0
(Romania) Adrian Voinea	6	6

=== Fifth qualifier ===
First round
5	(United Kingdom) Jeremy Bates	6	6
(United States) Bill Barber	2	2
(Colombia) Miguel Tobón	1	6
(Australia) Joshua Eagle	6	7
(Israel) Eyal Ran	2	0
(Croatia) Saša Hiršzon	6	6
(Netherlands) Fernon Wibier	1	4
27	(Brazil) Jaime Oncins	6	6

Second round
5	(United Kingdom) Jeremy Bates	3	3
(Australia) Joshua Eagle	6	6
(Croatia) Saša Hiršzon	5	5
27	(Brazil) Jaime Oncins	7	7

Qualifying competition
(Australia) Joshua Eagle	4	7	6
27	(Brazil) Jaime Oncins	6	6	2

=== Sixth qualifier ===
First round
6	(South Africa) Marcos Ondruska	6	6
(United States) Todd Nelson	4	3
(Kenya) Paul Wekesa	6	3	1
(Germany) Markus Naewie	4	6	6
(Netherlands) Tom Kempers	6	4	6
(Russia) Igor Kornienko	1	6	4
(Argentina) Alberto Mancini	4	6	6
28	(Australia) Neil Borwick	6	3	1

Second round
6	(South Africa) Marcos Ondruska	7	2	6
(Germany) Markus Naewie	6	6	2
(Netherlands) Tom Kempers	6	2	2
(Argentina) Alberto Mancini	4	6	6

Qualifying competition
6	(South Africa) Marcos Ondruska	6	6	6
(Argentina) Alberto Mancini	4	7	3

=== Seventh qualifier ===
First round
7	(Sweden) Lars Jonsson	6	7
(Belgium) Fabien Cousin	4	5
WC	(France) Nicolas Escudé	1	6
(Italy) Mario Visconti	6	7
(Italy) Massimo Valeri	5	3
(Argentina) Gastón Etlis	7	6
(Nigeria) Sulieman Ladipo	1	1
25	(Argentina) Daniel Orsanic	6	6

Second round
7	(Sweden) Lars Jonsson	5	6	6
(Italy) Mario Visconti	7	2	3
(Argentina) Gastón Etlis	4	7	6
25	(Argentina) Daniel Orsanic	6	5	2

Qualifying competition
7	(Sweden) Lars Jonsson	6	7
(Argentina) Gastón Etlis	2	6

=== Eighth qualifier ===
First round
8	(United Kingdom) Mark Petchey	7	7
(Ivory Coast) Clément N’Goran	5	6
(Netherlands) Sjeng Schalken	6	6
(Colombia) Jaime Cortés	4	1
(United States) Martin Blackman	6	6
(France) Guillaume Marx	4	0
(Australia) Grant Doyle	7	6
26	(Australia) Todd Woodbridge	6	3

Second round
8	(United Kingdom) Mark Petchey	2	6	3
(Netherlands) Sjeng Schalken	6	3	6
(United States) Martin Blackman	6	7
(Australia) Grant Doyle	0	6

Qualifying competition
(Netherlands) Sjeng Schalken	2	6	0
(United States) Martin Blackman	6	1	6

=== Ninth qualifier ===
First round
9	(United States) Robbie Weiss	3	3
(Germany) Peter Moraing	6	6
(Argentina) Agustín Garizzio	7	6
(Spain) Germán Puentes	6	0
WC	(France) Stéphane Sansoni	6	2	2
(Argentina) Pablo Escribano	4	6	6
(Peru) Alejandro Aramburu Acuna	4	6
23	(Australia) Sandon Stolle	6	7

Second round
(Germany) Peter Moraing	6	6
(Argentina) Agustín Garizzio	7	7
(Argentina) Pablo Escribano
23	(Australia) Sandon Stolle	w/o

Qualifying competition
(Argentina) Agustín Garizzio	6	5	6
(Argentina) Pablo Escribano	2	7	0

=== Tenth qualifier ===
First round
10	(Spain) Albert Costa	6	6
(Argentina) Marcelo Ingaramo	2	1
(United Kingdom) Barry Cowan	6	6
WC	(France) Aloïs Beust	7	7
(United States) Kent Kinnear	4	1
(France) Stéphane Huet	6	6
(Germany) Dirk Dier	7	2	6
24	(Brazil) Roberto Jabali	5	6	1

Second round
10	(Spain) Albert Costa	6	6
WC	(France) Aloïs Beust	1	1
(France) Stéphane Huet	2	5
(Germany) Dirk Dier	6	7

Qualifying competition
10	(Spain) Albert Costa	3	6	6
(Germany) Dirk Dier	6	3	4

=== Eleventh qualifier ===
First round
11	(Italy) Diego Nargiso	4	1
(Sweden) Mikael Tillström	6	6
(Australia) Peter Tramacchi	6	3	1
(Egypt) Tamer El-Sawy	2	6	6
(France) Jérôme Golmard	6	6
(Sweden) Thomas Johansson	3	4
WC	(France) Maxime Boyé	1	4
21	(Spain) Federico Sánchez	6	6

Second round
(Sweden) Mikael Tillström	6	6
(Egypt) Tamer El-Sawy	4	2
(France) Jérôme Golmard	4	7	6
21	(Spain) Federico Sánchez	6	6	3

Qualifying competition
(Sweden) Mikael Tillström	6	6
(France) Jérôme Golmard	4	3

=== Twelfth qualifier ===
First round
12	(Sweden) Christian Bergström	6	6
(Argentina) Diego del Río	2	1
(United States) Brian MacPhie	4	4
(Switzerland) Patrick Mohr	6	6
(Netherlands) Tom Nijssen	4	3
(Sweden) Lars-Anders Wahlgren	6	6
(Uruguay) Diego Perez	3	2
22	(Australia) Michael Tebbutt	6	6

Second round
12	(Sweden) Christian Bergström	3	7	4
(Switzerland) Patrick Mohr	6	5	6
(Sweden) Lars-Anders Wahlgren	6	6
22	(Australia) Michael Tebbutt	4	2

Qualifying competition
(Switzerland) Patrick Mohr	3	6	3
(Sweden) Lars-Anders Wahlgren	6	2	6

=== Thirteenth qualifier ===
First round
13	(Germany) David Prinosil	7	6
(Sweden) Nicklas Utgren	5	3
(Spain) Jose-Francisco Altur	3	4
WC	(France) Olivier Soules	6	6
(France) Pier Gauthier	1	2
(Spain) Juan Gisbert Schultze	6	6
(United States) Ivan Baron	1	4
19	(Norway) Christian Ruud	6	6

Second round
13	(Germany) David Prinosil	7	4	6
WC	(France) Olivier Soules	5	6	3
(Spain) Juan Gisbert Schultze	4	4
19	(Norway) Christian Ruud	6	6

Qualifying competition
13	(Germany) David Prinosil	1	5
19	(Norway) Christian Ruud	6	7

=== Fourteenth qualifier ===
First round
14	(Ukraine) Dimitri Poliakov	2	7	6
(Italy) Laurence Tieleman	6	6	1
(The Bahamas) Mark Knowles	4	2
(Spain) Emilio Benfele Álvarez	6	6
(Senegal) Yahiya Doumbia	4	5
(Spain) Juan-Albert Viloca-Puig	6	7
(The Bahamas) Roger Smith	2	4
20	(Australia) Brent Larkham	6	6

Second round
14	(Ukraine) Dimitri Poliakov	6	1	6
(Spain) Emilio Benfele Álvarez	2	6	2
(Spain) Juan-Albert Viloca-Puig	6	3
20	(Australia) Brent Larkham	7	6

Qualifying competition
14	(Ukraine) Dimitri Poliakov	6	6
20	(Australia) Brent Larkham	4	2

=== Fifteenth qualifier ===
First round
15	(Sweden) Tomas Nydahl	6	4
WC	(France) Tarik Benhabiles	7	6
(Argentina) Martin Rodriguez	6	6	6
(Croatia) Igor Šarić	7	2	8
(Czech Republic) Tomáš Anzari	7	6	6
(Argentina) Christian Miniussi	5	7	2
(South Africa) Lan Bale	6	3
17	(Italy) Cristiano Caratti	7	6

Second round
WC	(France) Tarik Benhabiles	6	6	10
(Croatia) Igor Šarić	4	7	8
(Czech Republic) Tomáš Anzari	5	4
17	(Italy) Cristiano Caratti	7	6

Qualifying competition
WC	(France) Tarik Benhabiles	6	3
17	(Italy) Cristiano Caratti	7	6

=== Sixteenth qualifier ===
First round
16	(United States) Doug Flach	3	1
WC	(Chile) Marcelo Ríos	6	6
(Argentina) Sebastián Pacheco	6	6
(Germany) Lars Rehmann	3	4
WC	(France) Grégory Carraz	2	4
(United Kingdom) Nick Gould	6	6
(Netherlands) Hendrik Jan Davids	1	6	4
18	(Argentina) Patricio Arnold	6	0	6

Second round
WC	(Chile) Marcelo Ríos	7	6
(Argentina) Sebastián Pacheco	5	3
(United Kingdom) Nick Gould	7	1	1
18	(Argentina) Patricio Arnold	5	6	6

Qualifying competition
WC	(Chile) Marcelo Ríos	6	3	6
18	(Argentina) Patricio Arnold	2	6	1
