= 1994 French Open – Women's singles qualifying =

Women's singles qualifying
- 1994 French Open

Events
Singles	men	women		boys	girls
Doubles	men	women	mixed	boys	girls
WC Singles	men	women	quad
WC Doubles	men	women	quad
Legends	−45	45+	women

Qualification
Singles	men	women
- French Open

Players who neither had high enough rankings nor received wild cards to enter the main draw of the annual French Open Tennis Championships participated in a qualifying tournament held in the week before the event.

== Seeds ==
1. -
2. (Germany) Petra Begerow (qualified)
3. (Argentina) Paola Suárez (qualified)
4. (Italy) Adriana Serra Zanetti (second round)
5. (Argentina) Bettina Fulco (qualified)
6. (Germany) Silke Meier (qualified)
7. (Australia) Jenny Byrne (second round)
8. (United States) Jolene Watanabe (first round)
9. (Czech Republic) Eva Švíglerová (first round)
10. (United States) Audra Keller (second round)
11. (Belgium) Sandra Wasserman (first round)
12. (Romania) Cătălina Cristea (qualifying competition, lucky loser)
13. (Germany) Maja Živec-Škulj (first round)
14. (Italy) Nathalie Baudone (second round)
15. (Spain) Ángeles Montolio (qualifying competition, lucky loser)
16. (Spain) Neus Ávila (first round)
17. (Slovakia) Radka Zrubáková (qualified)

== Qualifiers ==
1. (Slovakia) Radka Zrubáková
2. (Germany) Karin Kschwendt
3. (Italy) Laura Garrone
4. (Germany) Silke Meier
5. (Australia) Michelle Jaggard-Lai
6. (Argentina) Paola Suárez
7. (Argentina) Bettina Fulco
8. (Germany) Petra Begerow

== Lucky losers ==
1. (Spain) Ángeles Montolio
2. (Netherlands) Petra Kamstra
3. (Poland) Katarzyna Nowak
4. (Romania) Cătălina Cristea

== Qualifying draw ==
Key

- Q = Qualifier
- WC = Wild card
- LL = Lucky loser
- Alt = Alternate
- ITF = ITF entry
- PR = Protected ranking
- SR = Special ranking
- SE = Special exempt
- JE = Junior exempt
- JR = Junior Accelerator Programme entrant
- CO = College Accelerator Programme entrant
- NG = Next Gen Accelerator Program entrant
- w/o = Walkover
- r = Retired
- d = Defaulted

=== First qualifier ===
First round
17	(Slovakia) Radka Zrubáková	7^{7}	6
(Bulgaria) Elena Pampoulova	6^{2}	4
(Japan) Rika Hiraki	5	2
(Spain) Virginia Ruano Pascual	7	6
(United States) Katrina Adams	6	6
(United States) Erika deLone	0	4
(Netherlands) Linda Niemantsverdriet	6	1	1
14	(Italy) Nathalie Baudone	2	6	6

Second round
17	(Slovakia) Radka Zrubáková	6	4	6
(Spain) Virginia Ruano Pascual	3	6	1
(United States) Katrina Adams	6	4	6
14	(Italy) Nathalie Baudone	3	6	3

Qualifying competition
17	(Slovakia) Radka Zrubáková	6	6
(United States) Katrina Adams	3	2

=== Second qualifier ===
First round
11	(Belgium) Sandra Wasserman	6^{5}	4
(Germany) Karin Kschwendt	7^{7}	6
(Netherlands) Claire Wegink	6	7
(Australia) Jo-Anne Faull	2	5
WC	(France) Virginie Buisson	6	5	6
(Poland) Magdalena Feistel	4	7	4
(Croatia) Nadin Ercegović	6	6
8	(United States) Jolene Watanabe	0	4

Second round
(Germany) Karin Kschwendt	4	7	7
(Netherlands) Claire Wegink	6	5	5
WC	(France) Virginie Buisson	7	6
(Croatia) Nadin Ercegović	5	1

Qualifying competition
(Germany) Karin Kschwendt	6	1	6
WC	(France) Virginie Buisson	2	6	0

=== Third qualifier ===
First round
4	(Italy) Adriana Serra Zanetti	6	6
(Austria) Marion Maruska	2	3
(Italy) Laura Garrone	6	0	6
(South Korea) Park Sung-hee	3	6	2
(Netherlands) Petra Kamstra	6	3	6
WC	(France) Sylvie Sabas	1	6	2
(Australia) Kristin Godridge	2	6	6
16	(Spain) Neus Ávila	6	2	4

Second round
4	(Italy) Adriana Serra Zanetti	6	4	1
(Italy) Laura Garrone	3	6	6
(Netherlands) Petra Kamstra	6	6
(Australia) Kristin Godridge	3	3

Qualifying competition
(Italy) Laura Garrone	6	1	6
(Netherlands) Petra Kamstra	4	6	4

=== Fourth qualifier ===
First round
10	(United States) Audra Keller	6	6
(Venezuela) María Vento	3	4
(Poland) Katarzyna Nowak	6	4	7
(Canada) Sonya Jeyaseelan	1	6	5
(United States) Elly Hakami	2	3
(United States) Anne Mall	6	6
WC	(France) Caroline Dhenin	4	2
6	(Germany) Silke Meier	6	6

Second round
10	(United States) Audra Keller	5	3
(Poland) Katarzyna Nowak	7	6
(United States) Anne Mall	6	0	2
6	(Germany) Silke Meier	2	6	6

Qualifying competition
(Poland) Katarzyna Nowak	4	4
6	(Germany) Silke Meier	6	6

=== Fifth qualifier ===
First round
7	(Australia) Jenny Byrne	6	4	10
(Austria) Sylvia Plischke	4	6	8
(Venezuela) Melissa Mazzotta	7^{7}	5	2
(Brazil) Andrea Vieira	6^{3}	7	6
(Finland) Nanne Dahlman	6	3	8
(Australia) Michelle Jaggard-Lai	4	6	10
(Japan) Naoko Kijimuta	6	6
13	(Germany) Maja Živec-Škulj	3	0

Second round
7	(Australia) Jenny Byrne	6	5	3
(Brazil) Andrea Vieira	3	7	6
(Australia) Michelle Jaggard-Lai	6^{9}	6	7
(Japan) Naoko Kijimuta	7^{11}	2	5

Qualifying competition
(Brazil) Andrea Vieira	6^{3}	0
(Australia) Michelle Jaggard-Lai	7^{7}	6

=== Sixth qualifier ===
First round
15	(Spain) Ángeles Montolio	7^{8}	6
(Croatia) Maja Palaveršić	6^{6}	2
WC	(France) Olivia De Camaret	3	1
(Germany) Heike Rusch	6	6
WC	(France) Laurence Bois	1	1
(Austria) Barbara Paulus	6	6
(Italy) Rita Grande	3	5
3	(Argentina) Paola Suárez	6	7

Second round
15	(Spain) Ángeles Montolio	6	7^{7}
(Germany) Heike Rusch	2	6^{4}
(Austria) Barbara Paulus	3	5
3	(Argentina) Paola Suárez	6	7

Qualifying competition
15	(Spain) Ángeles Montolio	6	4	3
3	(Argentina) Paola Suárez	3	6	6

=== Seventh qualifier ===
First round
5	(Argentina) Bettina Fulco	6	6
WC	(France) Sophie Amiach	1	2
(Slovenia) Tina Križan	6	6
(Portugal) Sofia Prazeres	2	0
(Argentina) Mercedes Paz	6	6^{5}	6
(Greece) Christína Papadáki	4	7^{7}	1
(Australia) Nicole Pratt	6^{7}	6	1
9	(Czech Republic) Eva Švíglerová	7^{9}	1	0^{r}

Second round
5	(Argentina) Bettina Fulco	6	6
(Slovenia) Tina Križan	4	4
(Argentina) Mercedes Paz	6	6
(Australia) Nicole Pratt	3	1

Qualifying competition
5	(Argentina) Bettina Fulco	7^{7}	6
(Argentina) Mercedes Paz	6^{4}	2

=== Eighth qualifier ===
First round
12	(Romania) Cătălina Cristea	6	5	6
(Belgium) Els Callens	2	7	4
(United States) Ann Henricksson	1	0
(Italy) Federica Bonsignori	6	6
(Canada) Jana Nejedly	4	6^{5}
WC	(France) Nathalie Guerrée-Spitzer	6	7^{7}
WC	(France) Sybille Niox-Château	2	2
2	(Germany) Petra Begerow	6	6

Second round
12	(Romania) Cătălina Cristea	4	7^{7}	6
(Italy) Federica Bonsignori	6	6^{4}	4
WC	(France) Nathalie Guerrée-Spitzer	2	1
2	(Germany) Petra Begerow	6	6

Qualifying competition
12	(Romania) Cătălina Cristea	6	0	7
2	(Germany) Petra Begerow	3	6	9
