= Aloïs Beust =

French tennis player

- Country (sports): France
- Born: 8 February 1970 (age 55); Deauville, Normandy, France
- Plays: Right-handed
- Prize money: $25,969

Singles
- Career record: 0–1
- Highest ranking: No. 348 (4 October 1993)

Grand Slam singles results
- French Open: Q2 (1993, 1994)
- Wimbledon: Q1 (1994)

Doubles
- Career record: 1–1
- Highest ranking: No. 257 (30 August 1993)

Grand Slam doubles results
- French Open: 2R (1994)

Grand Slam mixed doubles results
- French Open: 1R (1995)

Aloïs Beust (born 8 February 1970) is a French former professional tennis player.

== Biography ==
Born in Deauville, Beust is the son of French Davis Cup doubles player Patrice Beust.

Beust, a right-handed player, competed on the professional tour in the early 1990s, reaching a best singles ranking of 348 in the world. He played in the qualifiers of both the French Open and Wimbledon during his career. At the French Open, he made the second qualifying round on two occasions, including in 1993 when he was narrowly beaten by Pat Rafter, 7–9 in the final set.

He was in the French National Team Under 12, 14, 16 (European Champion), 18 and 21 years Old

His only ATP Tour main draw appearance came at the 1994 Italian Open, where he came through the qualifiers, beating Darren Cahill en route. He was beaten in the first round by local wildcard Diego Nargiso, in three sets.

As a doubles player, Beust twice featured in the main draw of the French Open. He made the second round of the men's doubles at the 1994 French Open (with Stéphane Huet) and appeared in the mixed doubles the following year (with Caroline Dhenin).

He was the Captain of the World Champion French team Under 16 in 1995 after winning both Winter and Summer European Cup with the same team.

He has been working for the French Tennis Federation since 1999 as National Coach and is, now, in charge of the 15 to 21 Years Old Boys program
