= 1995 French Open – Mixed doubles =

Mixed doubles
- 1995 French Open

Final
- Champion: (Latvia) Larisa Savchenko-Neiland (Australia) Mark Woodforde
- Runner-up: (Canada) Jill Hetherington (South Africa) John-Laffnie de Jager
- Score: 7–6^{(10–8)}, 7–6^{(7–4)}

Details
- Draw: 48
- Seeds: 16

Events
| Singles | men | women | | boys | girls |
| Doubles | men | women | mixed | boys | girls |
| WC Singles | men | women | quad |
| WC Doubles | men | women | quad |
| Legends | −45 | 45+ | women |
- French Open

The 1995 French Open was a tennis tournament that took place on the outdoor clay courts at the Stade Roland Garros in Paris, France. The tournament was held from 29 May until 11 June. It was the 94th staging of the French Open, and the second Grand Slam tennis event of 1995.

== Seeds ==
Champion seeds are indicated in bold text while text in italics indicates the round in which those seeds were eliminated.

1. (Australia) **Mark Woodforde** / (Latvia) **Larisa Savchenko-Neiland (champions)**
2. (United States) Jonathan Stark / (United States) Meredith McGrath (second round)
3. (Czech Republic) Cyril Suk / (United States) Gigi Fernández (semifinals)
4. (Zimbabwe) Byron Black / (Australia) Rennae Stubbs (third round)
5. (Russia) Andrei Olhovskiy / (Russia) Eugenia Maniokova (quarterfinals)
6. (Netherlands) Paul Haarhuis / (Ukraine) Natalia Medvedeva (quarterfinals)
7. (United States) Patrick Galbraith / (South Africa) Elna Reinach (third round)
8. (South Africa) Lan Bale / (South Africa) Amanda Coetzer (second round)
9. (Australia) John Fitzgerald / (Netherlands) Manon Bollegraf (second round)
10. (France) Olivier Delaître / (France) Julie Halard-Decugis (semifinals)
11. (United States) Trevor Kronemann / (United States) Zina Garrison (third round)
12. (United States) Rick Leach / (Belarus) Natasha Zvereva (second round)
13. (United States) Greg Van Emburgh / (United States) Nicole Arendt (third round)
14. (United States) Luke Jensen / (Netherlands) Brenda Schultz (quarterfinals)
15. (South Africa) Gary Muller / (United States) Linda Wild (second round)
16. (Netherlands) Menno Oosting / (Netherlands) Kristie Boogert (second round)

== Draw ==
Key

- Q = Qualifier
- WC = Wild card
- LL = Lucky loser
- Alt = Alternate
- ITF = ITF entry
- PR = Protected ranking
- SR = Special ranking
- SE = Special exempt
- JE = Junior exempt
- JR = Junior Accelerator Programme entrant
- CO = College Accelerator Programme entrant
- NG = Next Gen Accelerator Program entrant
- w/o = Walkover
- r = Retired
- d = Defaulted

=== Finals ===
Quarterfinals
1 | (Australia) Mark Woodforde (Latvia) Larisa Savchenko-Neiland | 7 | 6
5 | (Russia) Andrei Olhovskiy (Russia) Eugenia Maniokova | 5 | 4
3 | (Czech Republic) Cyril Suk (United States) Gigi Fernández | 7 | 6
(United States) Kenny Thorne (Indonesia) Yayuk Basuki | 5 | 3
6 | (Netherlands) Paul Haarhuis (Ukraine) Natalia Medvedeva | 6 | 5 | 4
(Australia) David Macpherson (Australia) Rachel McQuillan | 3 | 7 | 6
14 | (United States) Luke Jensen (Netherlands) Brenda Schultz | 4 | 1
(South Africa) John-Laffnie de Jager (Canada) Jill Hetherington | 6 | 6

Semifinals
1 | (Australia) Mark Woodforde (Latvia) Larisa Savchenko-Neiland | 6 | 4 | 12
3 | (Czech Republic) Cyril Suk (United States) Gigi Fernández | 4 | 6 | 10
(Australia) David Macpherson (Australia) Rachel McQuillan | 4 | 1
(South Africa) John-Laffnie de Jager (Canada) Jill Hetherington | 6 | 6

Finals
1 | (Australia) Mark Woodforde (Latvia) Larisa Savchenko-Neiland | 7 | 7
(South Africa) John-Laffnie de Jager (Canada) Jill Hetherington | 6^{8} | 6^{4}

=== Top half ===
==== Section 1 ====
First round
(France) L Barthez (France) I Demongeot | 3 | 6 | 6
(United Kingdom) N Broad (Canada) R Simpson | 6 | 1 | 2
(The Bahamas) M Knowles (United States) A Grossman | 6 | 6
(France) A Beust (France) C Dhenin | 2 | 3
(South Africa) D Visser (Romania) I Spîrlea | 6 | 6
(France) G Solvès (France) N Herreman | 2 | 3
(Mexico) J Lozano (United States) L McNeil | 1 | 7 | 6
(France) G Raoux (France) A Fusai | 6 | 5 | 3

Second round
1 | (Australia) M Woodforde (Latvia) L Savchenko-Neiland | 6 | 3 | 11
(France) L Barthez (France) I Demongeot | 2 | 6 | 9
(The Bahamas) M Knowles (United States) A Grossman | 6 | 6^{4} | 6
16 | (Netherlands) M Oosting (Netherlands) K Boogert | 2 | 7 | 4
13 | (United States) G Van Emburgh (United States) N Arendt | 7 | 6
(South Africa) D Visser (Romania) I Spîrlea | 5 | 1
(Mexico) J Lozano (United States) L McNeil | 1 | 2
5 | (Russia) A Olhovskiy (Russia) E Maniokova | 6 | 6

Third round
1 | (Australia) M Woodforde (Latvia) L Savchenko-Neiland | 6 | 6
(The Bahamas) M Knowles (United States) A Grossman | 0 | 2
13 | (United States) G Van Emburgh (United States) N Arendt | 6 | 5 | 0
5 | (Russia) A Olhovskiy (Russia) E Maniokova | 3 | 7 | 6

Quarterfinals
1 | (Australia) M Woodforde (Latvia) L Savchenko-Neiland | 7 | 6
5 | (Russia) A Olhovskiy (Russia) E Maniokova | 5 | 4

==== Section 2 ====
First round
(Australia) J Eagle (Australia) K-A Guse | 5 | 6 | 6
(Australia) W Arthurs (Australia) K Radford | 7 | 3 | 4
(Sweden) P Nyborg (Sweden) M Strandlund | 6 | 6
(South Africa) P Norval (Hong Kong) K Godridge | 4 | 4
(United States) K Jones (United States) K Adams | 3 | 6 | 6
(United States) D Randall (Germany) W Probst | 6 | 4 | 3
(United States) K Thorne (Indonesia) Y Basuki | 7 | 7
(Netherlands) T Kempers (Netherlands) C Vis | 6^{6} | 6^{3}

Second round
3 | (Czech Republic) C Suk (United States) G Fernández | 6 | 6
(Australia) J Eagle (Australia) K-A Guse | 2 | 3
(Sweden) P Nyborg (Sweden) M Strandlund | 1 | 2
10 | (France) O Delaître (France) J Halard-Decugis | 6 | 6
11 | (United States) T Kronemann (United States) Z Garrison | 6 | 3 | 7
(United States) K Jones (United States) K Adams | 1 | 6 | 5
(United States) K Thorne (Indonesia) Y Basuki | 6 | 4 | 8
8 | (South Africa) L Bale (South Africa) A Coetzer | 2 | 6 | 6

Third round
3 | (Czech Republic) C Suk (United States) G Fernández | 6 | 6
10 | (France) O Delaître (France) J Halard-Decugis | 3 | 2
11 | (United States) T Kronemann (United States) Z Garrison | 4 | 7 | 4
(United States) K Thorne (Indonesia) Y Basuki | 6 | 5 | 6

Quarterfinals
3 | (Czech Republic) C Suk (United States) G Fernández | 7 | 6
(United States) K Thorne (Indonesia) Y Basuki | 5 | 3

=== Bottom half ===
==== Section 3 ====
First round
(Netherlands) HJ Davids (Netherlands) M Oremans | 6^{8} | 7 | 6
(South Africa) E Ferreira (Italy) L Golarsa | 7 | 5 | 3
(Belgium) L Pimek (United Kingdom) C Wood | 5 | 6 | 9
(Sweden) L-A Wahlgren (Sweden) M Lindström | 7 | 2 | 7
(Australia) D Macpherson (Australia) R McQuillan | 7 | 6
(France) S Huet (France) L Ghirardi | 5 | 2
(United States) J Waite (United States) S Stafford | 6 | 6
(United States) M Jensen (France) M Pierce | 4 | 4

Second round
6 | (Netherlands) P Haarhuis (Ukraine) N Medvedeva | 6 | 6
(Netherlands) HJ Davids (Netherlands) M Oremans | 3 | 2
(Belgium) L Pimek (United Kingdom) C Wood | 6 | 6
12 | (United States) R Leach (Belarus) N Zvereva | 4 | 4
15 | (South Africa) G Muller (United States) L Wild | 4 | 6 | 0
(Australia) D Macpherson (Australia) R McQuillan | 6 | 2 | 6
(United States) J Waite (United States) S Stafford | 6^{5} | 4
4 | (Zimbabwe) B Black (Australia) R Stubbs | 7 | 6

Third round
6 | (Netherlands) P Haarhuis (Ukraine) N Medvedeva | 1 | 6 | 6
(Belgium) L Pimek (United Kingdom) C Wood | 6 | 2 | 0
(Australia) D Macpherson (Australia) R McQuillan | 6 | 7
4 | (Zimbabwe) B Black (Australia) R Stubbs | 2 | 6^{5}

Quarterfinals
6 | (Netherlands) P Haarhuis (Ukraine) N Medvedeva | 6 | 5 | 4
(Australia) D Macpherson (Australia) R McQuillan | 3 | 7 | 6

==== Section 4 ====
First round
(Iran) M Bahrami (Spain) A Sánchez Vicario | 6 | 4 | 6
(Australia) A Florent (Australia) C Barclay | 4 | 6 | 2
(Netherlands) T Nijssen (Czech Republic) H Suková | 6 | 6
(United States) M Bauer (United States) P Fendick | 2 | 3
(South Africa) J-L de Jager (Canada) J Hetherington | 6 | 4 | 6
(United States) M Keil (United States) T Whitlinger-Jones | 1 | 6 | 3
(Argentina) D Orsanic (Argentina) P Tarabini | 4 | 6 | 6
(Netherlands) S Noteboom (Netherlands) N Muns-Jagerman | 6 | 3 | 3

Second round
7 | (United States) P Galbraith (South Africa) E Reinach | w/o
(Iran) M Bahrami (Spain) A Sánchez Vicario
(Netherlands) T Nijssen (Czech Republic) H Suková | 4 | 2
14 | (United States) L Jensen (Netherlands) B Schultz | 6 | 6
9 | (Australia) J Fitzgerald (Netherlands) Manon Bollegraf | 6^{3} | 5
(South Africa) J-L de Jager (Canada) J Hetherington | 7 | 7
(Argentina) D Orsanic (Argentina) P Tarabini | 6 | 3 | 6
2 | (United States) J Stark (United States) M McGrath | 4 | 6 | 3

Third round
7 | (United States) P Galbraith (South Africa) E Reinach | 6^{5} | 5
14 | (United States) L Jensen (Netherlands) B Schultz | 7 | 7
(South Africa) J-L de Jager (Canada) J Hetherington | 0 | 6 | 6
(Argentina) D Orsanic (Argentina) P Tarabini | 6 | 2 | 1

Quarterfinals
14 | (United States) L Jensen (Netherlands) B Schultz | 4 | 1
(South Africa) J-L de Jager (Canada) J Hetherington | 6 | 6
