= John-Laffnie de Jager =

South African tennis player

- Country (sports): South Africa
- Residence: Ermelo, Transvaal, South Africa
- Born: 17 March 1973 (age 53) Johannesburg, South Africa
- Height: 1.93 m (6 ft 4 in)
- Turned pro: 1992
- Retired: 2003
- Plays: Right-handed
- Prize money: $1,357,700

Singles
- Career record: 0–3
- Career titles: 0; 0 Challenger, 0 Futures
- Highest ranking: No. 313 (12 October 1992)

Grand Slam singles results
- Australian Open: Q1 (1993)
- Wimbledon: 1R (1992)
- US Open: Q2 (1992)

Doubles
- Career record: 246–258
- Career titles: 7; 7 Challenger, 0 Futures
- Highest ranking: No. 11 (31 July 2000)

Grand Slam doubles results
- Australian Open: SF (1993)
- French Open: 2R (1993, 1998)
- Wimbledon: SF (2000)
- US Open: SF (1998, 2001)

Other doubles tournaments
- Tour Finals: RR (1999)
- Olympic Games: SF – 4th (2000)

Grand Slam mixed doubles results
- Australian Open: F (1997)
- French Open: F (1995)
- Wimbledon: QF (1997, 2000)
- US Open: SF (1994)
- Last updated on: 24 November 2021.

John-Laffnie de Jager (born 17 March 1973) is a South African former tour professional tennis player. A doubles specialist, de Jager reached the semi-finals of three different grand slam tournaments in three different years partnering three different fellow South African players. De Jager is a former non-playing captain of the South Africa Davis Cup team.

== Career ==
A native of Ermelo, de Jager turned professional in 1992 during which year he played his only tour singles. He won two of five matches he played on the challenger circuit and reached through qualifying the main draw at Wimbledon, where he lost in the first round to future champion Richard Krajicek, 7–5 6–1 6–2. He played but one other event in singles, a challenger in Dublin in October, before focusing his tennis exclusively on doubles. His career high singles ranking stood at World No. 313, reached in October.

De Jager won back-to-back challenger events in doubles in September 1991, partnering compatriots, in Madeira partnering Byron Talbot and in Jerusalem with Christo van Rensburg. He played some half dozen times with Van Rensburg in 1991-2 and some dozen times, but with limited success, with Johan de Beer. He won two more challenger events the following year, in June partnering Zimbabwean Byron Black and in November with Capetonian Marius Barnard. 1993 saw de Jager reach his first of three grand slam semis, in partnership with yet another South African, Marcos Ondruska. Together they reached the second round at the Roland Garros and the third round at Wimbledon. In October, de Jager reached his first Grand Prix event final, in Lyon partnering still another South African and Capetonian, Stefan Kruger.

1994 saw de Jager reach four grand prix semi-finals, with three different partners (all southern Africans), another final and capture his first grand prix win, in Tel Aviv partnering still another compatriot, Pietermaritzburg native Lan Bale. Aside from a few occasions, most notable of which was a four tournament stint where he partnered Aussie doubles master John Fitzgerald, de Jager and Bale remained a team into 1995. Together they reached the Stuttgart Indoor, Munich, and Italian Open grand prix, but faltered at the French where they went out in the first round. After a third round exit at Wimbledon, and first round exit at Flushing Meadows, the partnership was dissolved in September. The change worked immediately for de Jager as he won his very next tournament, the Toulouse Grand Prix, partnering Swede Jonas Björkman. He again had success in Lyon, reaching the final with star compatriot Wayne Ferreira. Beginning 1996 playing mostly with Gary Muller, de Jager played the late spring and summer with some 10 different partners and without reaching a single event final. His misfortune got worse in the first of half of 1997, where a string of first round loses saw his doubles ranking fall from No. 53 in September 1996 to No. 164 by August 1997. A new partnership with yet another compatriot, this time Robbie Koenig saw de Jager recover his form, with a quarterfinal result at the U.S. Open followed by winning a challenger event and reaching the finals of another. Then with Pretoria's Chris Haggard, he won the following two challengers as well.

De Jager began 1998 partnering Koenig, reaching the semis of the Sydney Outdoor, the third round of the Australian Open, and the second round or better of every tournament but one through Roland Garros, where they reached the third round. Their success continued throughout the summer, culminating in but only de Jager's second grand slam semis appearance, at the 1998 U.S. Open. During the autumn de Jager partnership altered between the one of him and Koenig and a newer one, with yet another South African, David Adams. De Jager played exclusively with Adams for 1999 and the tandem met with success in reaching the finals or better six times in International Series events. This led to their competing in the ATP Doubles Championship, where they lost in the round robin however. The duo had an even year 2000 nevertheless winning back-to-back in February, in Rotterdam and London, in Munich in May, and reaching the semi-finals of Wimbledon. At the Sydney Olympics, they again finished as semi-finalists, for de Jager, for the third and final time. He achieved his career high ranking in doubles at the end of July, at World No. 11.

He reached two Grand Slam finals in mixed doubles. In 1995 he reached the final of the French Open with Jill Hetherington but they lost 6–7 6–7 to Larisa Neiland and Todd Woodbridge. In 1997 he partnered Larisa Neiland to reach the final of the Australian Open, but they lost 3–6, 7–6, 5–7 to Manon Bollegraf and Rick Leach.

== Junior Grand Slam finals ==
=== Doubles: 3 (1 title, 2 runner-ups) ===
| Result | Year | Championship | Surface | Partner | Opponents | Score |
|---|---|---|---|---|---|---|
| Loss | 1989 | Wimbledon | Grass | (South Africa) Wayne Ferreira | (United States) Jared Palmer (United States) Jonathan Stark | 6–7^{(4–7)}, 6–7^{(2–7)} |
| Loss | 1991 | Wimbledon | Grass | (Ukraine) Andrei Medvedev | (Morocco) Karim Alami (United Kingdom) Greg Rusedski | 6–1, 6–7^{(4–7)}, 4–6 |
| Win | 1991 | US Open | Hard | (Morocco) Karim Alami | (United States) Michael Joyce (United States) Vince Spadea | 6–4, 6–7, 6–1 |

== Major finals ==
=== Grand Slam finals ===
==== Mixed doubles: 2 (2 runners-up) ====
| Result | Year | Championship | Surface | Partner | Opponents | Score |
|---|---|---|---|---|---|---|
| Loss | 1995 | French Open | Clay | (Canada) Jill Hetherington | (Latvia) Larisa Savchenko Neiland (Australia) Todd Woodbridge | 6–7^{(8–10)}, 6–7^{(4–7)} |
| Loss | 1997 | Australian Open | Hard | (Latvia) Larisa Savchenko Neiland | (Netherlands) Manon Bollegraf (United States) Rick Leach | 3–6, 7–6^{(7–5)}, 5–7 |

=== Olympic finals ===
==== Doubles: 1 ====
| Result | Year | Location | Surface | Partner | Opponents | Score |
|---|---|---|---|---|---|---|
| 4th place | 2000 | Sydney | Hard | (South Africa) David Adams | (Spain) Àlex Corretja (Spain) Albert Costa | 6–2, 4–6, 3–6 |

== ATP career finals ==
=== Doubles: 19 (7 titles, 12 runner-ups) ===
| Legend Grand Slam Tournaments (0–0) ATP World Tour Finals (0–0) ATP Masters Series (0–2) ATP Championship Series (3–2) ATP World Series (4–8) | Finals by surface Hard (4–6) Clay (1–1) Grass (0–1) Carpet (2–4) | Finals by setting Outdoors (2–6) Indoors (5–6) |

| Result | W–L | Date | Tournament | Tier | Surface | Partner | Opponents | Score |
|---|---|---|---|---|---|---|---|---|
| Win | 1–0 | Nov 1992 | Moscow, Russia | World Series | Carpet | (South Africa) Marius Barnard | (South Africa) David Adams (Russia) Andrei Olhovskiy | 6–4, 3–6, 7–6 |
| Loss | 1–1 | Oct 1993 | Lyon, France | World Series | Carpet | (South Africa) Stefan Kruger | (South Africa) Gary Muller (South Africa) Danie Visser | 3–6, 6–7 |
| Loss | 1–2 | Oct 1994 | Basel, Switzerland | World Series | Hard | (South Africa) Lan Bale | (United States) Jared Palmer (United States) Patrick McEnroe | 3–6, 6–7 |
| Win | 2–2 | Oct 1994 | Tel Aviv, Israel | World Series | Hard | (South Africa) Lan Bale | (Sweden) Jan Apell (Sweden) Jonas Björkman | 6–7, 6–2, 7–6 |
| Win | 3–2 | Oct 1995 | Toulouse, France | World Series | Hard | (Sweden) Jonas Björkman | (United States) Dave Randall (United States) Greg Van Emburgh | 7–6, 7–6 |
| Loss | 3–3 | Oct 1995 | Lyon, France | World Series | Carpet | (South Africa) Wayne Ferreira | (Switzerland) Jakob Hlasek (Russia) Yevgeny Kafelnikov | 3–6, 3–6 |
| Loss | 3–4 | Jun 1998 | Halle, Germany | World Series | Grass | (Germany) Marc-Kevin Goellner | (South Africa) Ellis Ferreira (United States) Rick Leach | 6–4, 4–6, 6–7 |
| Loss | 3–5 | Oct 1998 | Vienna, Austria | Championship Series | Carpet | (South Africa) David Adams | (Russia) Yevgeny Kafelnikov (Czech Republic) Daniel Vacek | 5–7, 3–6 |
| Loss | 3–6 | Feb 1999 | Dubai, United Arab Emirates | World Series | Hard | (South Africa) David Adams | (Zimbabwe) Wayne Black (Australia) Sandon Stolle | 6–4, 1–6, 4–6 |
| Win | 4–6 | Feb 1999 | Rotterdam, Netherlands | Championship Series | Carpet | (South Africa) David Adams | (United Kingdom) Neil Broad (Australia) Peter Tramacchi | 6–7, 6–3, 6–4 |
| Loss | 4–7 | May 1999 | Rome, Italy | Masters Series | Clay | (South Africa) David Adams | (South Africa) Ellis Ferreira (United States) Rick Leach | 7–6, 1–6, 2–6 |
| Loss | 4–8 | Aug 1999 | Washington, United States | Championship Series | Hard | (South Africa) David Adams | (United States) Justin Gimelstob (Canada) Sébastien Lareau | 5–7, 7–6, 3–6 |
| Loss | 4–9 | Oct 1999 | Toulouse, France | World Series | Carpet | (South Africa) David Adams | (France) Olivier Delaître (United States) Jeff Tarango | 6–3, 6–7, 4–6 |
| Loss | 4–10 | Oct 1999 | Stuttgart, Germany | Masters Series | Hard | (South Africa) David Adams | (Zimbabwe) Byron Black (Sweden) Jonas Björkman | 7–6, 6–7, 0–6 |
| Win | 5–10 | Feb 2000 | Rotterdam, Netherlands | Championship Series | Hard | (South Africa) David Adams | (United Kingdom) Tim Henman (Russia) Yevgeny Kafelnikov | 5–7, 6–2, 6–3 |
| Win | 6–10 | Feb 2000 | London, United Kingdom | Championship Series | Hard | (South Africa) David Adams | (United States) Jan-Michael Gambill (United States) Scott Humphries | 6–3, 6–7^{(7–9)}, 7–6^{(13–11)} |
| Win | 7–10 | May 2000 | Munich, Germany | International Series | Clay | (South Africa) David Adams | (Belarus) Max Mirnyi (Socialist Federal Republic of Yugoslavia) Nenad Zimonjić | 6–4, 6–4 |
| Loss | 7–11 | Sep 2001 | Shanghai, China | International Series | Hard | (South Africa) Robbie Koenig | (Zimbabwe) Byron Black (Japan) Thomas Shimada | 2–6, 6–3, 5–7 |
| Loss | 7–12 | Mar 2002 | San Jose, United States | International Series | Hard | (South Africa) Robbie Koenig | (Zimbabwe) Wayne Black (Zimbabwe) Kevin Ullyett | 3–6, 6–4, [5–10] |

== ATP Challenger and ITF Futures finals ==
=== Doubles: 9 (7–2) ===
| Legend ATP Challenger (7–2) ITF Futures (0–0) | Finals by surface Hard (5–1) Clay (1–0) Grass (0–1) Carpet (1–0) |

| Result | W–L | Date | Tournament | Tier | Surface | Partner | Opponents | Score |
|---|---|---|---|---|---|---|---|---|
| Loss | 0–1 | Jul 1991 | Newcastle, United Kingdom | Challenger | Grass | (South Africa) Christo van Rensburg | (United Kingdom) Nicholas Fulwood (Sweden) Peter Nyborg | 6–7, 1–6 |
| Win | 1–1 | Sep 1991 | Madeira, Portugal | Challenger | Hard | (South Africa) Byron Talbot | (Zimbabwe) Byron Black (United States) T. J. Middleton | 2–6, 7–6, 6–4 |
| Win | 2–1 | Oct 1991 | Jerusalem, Israel | Challenger | Hard | (South Africa) Christo van Rensburg | (Nigeria) Nduka Odizor (United States) Bryan Shelton | 6–2, 6–4 |
| Win | 3–1 | Jun 1992 | Turin, Italy | Challenger | Clay | (Zimbabwe) Byron Black | (United States) T. J. Middleton (United States) Ted Scherman | 6–4, 6–2 |
| Win | 4–1 | Oct 1997 | Sedona, United States | Challenger | Hard | (South Africa) Robbie Koenig | (United States) Adam Peterson (United States) Eric Taino | 6–2, 6–2 |
| Loss | 4–2 | Oct 1997 | Brest, France | Challenger | Hard | (South Africa) Robbie Koenig | (United States) Dave Randall (United States) Jack Waite | 6–3, 6–7, 4–6 |
| Win | 5–2 | Nov 1997 | Aachen, Germany | Challenger | Hard | (South Africa) Chris Haggard | (United States) Dave Randall (United States) Jack Waite | 3–6, 6–1, 7–6 |
| Win | 6–2 | Nov 1997 | Neumünster, Germany | Challenger | Carpet | (South Africa) Chris Haggard | (Germany) Lars Burgsmüller (Germany) Markus Hantschk | 6–3, 6–1 |
| Win | 7–2 | Aug 2001 | Lexington, United States | Challenger | Hard | (South Africa) Robbie Koenig | (Australia) Paul Kilderry (United States) Jack Waite | 7–6^{(7–1)}, 7–5 |

== Performance timelines ==
Key
| W | F | SF | QF | #R | RR | Q# | DNQ | A | NH |

(W) winner; (F) finalist; (SF) semifinalist; (QF) quarterfinalist; (#R) rounds 4, 3, 2, 1; (RR) round-robin stage; (Q#) qualification round; (DNQ) did not qualify; (A) absent; (NH) not held; (SR) strike rate (events won / competed); (W–L) win–loss record.

=== Doubles ===
| Tournament | 1992 | 1993 | 1994 | 1995 | 1996 | 1997 | 1998 | 1999 | 2000 | 2001 | 2002 | 2003 | SR | W–L | Win % |
|---|---|---|---|---|---|---|---|---|---|---|---|---|---|---|---|
Grand Slam tournaments
| Australian Open | A | SF | 2R | 1R | 2R | 1R | 3R | 3R | 2R | A | 1R | 2R | 0 / 10 | 12–10 | 55% |
| French Open | A | 2R | 1R | 1R | 1R | 1R | 2R | 1R | 1R | A | 1R | A | 0 / 9 | 2–9 | 18% |
| Wimbledon | 2R | 3R | 1R | 3R | 1R | 2R | 3R | 3R | SF | 2R | 2R | 1R | 0 / 12 | 16–12 | 57% |
| US Open | 1R | 1R | 3R | 1R | 2R | QF | SF | 2R | 1R | QF | A | 1R | 0 / 11 | 14–11 | 56% |
| Win–loss | 1–2 | 7–4 | 3–4 | 2–4 | 2–4 | 4–4 | 9–4 | 5–4 | 5–4 | 4–2 | 1–3 | 1–3 | 0 / 42 | 44–42 | 51% |
National Representation
| Summer Olympic Games | A | Not Held | | | A | Not Held | | | 4th | Not Held | | | 0 / 1 | 3–2 | 60% |
Year-end Championships
| ATP World Tour Finals | Did not qualify | | | | | | | RR | DNQ | | | | 0 / 1 | 0–3 | 0% |
ATP Masters Series
| Indian Wells | A | A | SF | 2R | QF | A | 1R | 1R | QF | 1R | 1R | A | 0 / 8 | 8–8 | 50% |
| Miami | A | A | 2R | 3R | 1R | 2R | 1R | 2R | 3R | QF | 2R | A | 0 / 9 | 7–9 | 44% |
| Monte Carlo | A | A | SF | QF | 1R | A | A | 1R | 2R | 1R | 1R | A | 0 / 7 | 6–7 | 46% |
| Rome | A | 1R | SF | SF | 1R | Q1 | 1R | F | 1R | A | 1R | A | 0 / 8 | 10–8 | 56% |
| Hamburg | A | A | 2R | 1R | QF | A | 2R | 2R | 1R | A | A | A | 0 / 6 | 5–6 | 45% |
| Canada | A | 1R | A | A | A | A | 1R | SF | QF | A | A | A | 0 / 4 | 5–4 | 56% |
| Cincinnati | A | 2R | 1R | 2R | A | A | 2R | QF | 1R | A | A | A | 0 / 6 | 5–6 | 45% |
| Stuttgart | A | A | A | A | QF | A | 1R | F | 2R | A | A | A | 0 / 4 | 5–4 | 56% |
| Paris | A | Q3 | 1R | 2R | A | A | 1R | 2R | QF | A | A | A | 0 / 5 | 3–5 | 38% |
| Win–loss | 0–0 | 1–3 | 11–7 | 9–7 | 6–6 | 1–1 | 2–8 | 14–9 | 7–9 | 2–3 | 1–4 | 0–0 | 0 / 57 | 54–57 | 49% |

=== Mixed doubles ===
| Tournament | 1993 | 1994 | 1995 | 1996 | 1997 | 1998 | 1999 | 2000 | 2001 | 2002 | 2003 | SR | W–L | Win % |
|---|---|---|---|---|---|---|---|---|---|---|---|---|---|---|
Grand Slam tournaments
| Australian Open | A | 1R | 2R | SF | F | A | 1R | 2R | A | A | A | 0 / 6 | 9–6 | 60% |
| French Open | 1R | 1R | F | 3R | A | QF | 3R | SF | A | A | A | 0 / 7 | 12–7 | 63% |
| Wimbledon | 2R | 1R | 2R | 1R | QF | 1R | 2R | QF | 2R | 1R | 2R | 0 / 11 | 11–11 | 50% |
| US Open | A | SF | 1R | 2R | A | 2R | QF | A | A | A | A | 0 / 5 | 7–5 | 58% |
| Win–loss | 1–2 | 3–4 | 7–4 | 5–4 | 7–2 | 3–3 | 4–4 | 7–3 | 1–1 | 0–1 | 1–1 | 0 / 29 | 39–29 | 57% |
