= 1994 French Open – Men's doubles =

Men's doubles
- 1994 French Open

Final
- Champions: (Zimbabwe) Byron Black (United States) Jonathan Stark
- Runners-up: (Sweden) Jan Apell (Sweden) Jonas Björkman
- Score: 6–4, 7–6

Details
- Draw: 64
- Seeds: 16

Events
Singles	men	women		boys	girls
Doubles	men	women	mixed	boys	girls
WC Singles	men	women	quad
WC Doubles	men	women	quad
Legends	−45	45+	women
← 1993 ·	French Open	· 1995 →

Luke and Murphy Jensen were the defending champions, but they were defeated in the third round by The Woodies.

Byron Black and Jonathan Stark won the championship, defeating the Swedes Jan Apell and Jonas Björkman in the final. It was the first Grand Slam title for the pair, despite Black reaching the World No. 1 ranking earlier this year.

== Seeds ==
1. (Canada) Grant Connell / (United States) Patrick Galbraith (semifinals)
2. (Zimbabwe) Byron Black / (United States) Jonathan Stark (champions)
3. (Netherlands) Jacco Eltingh / (Netherlands) Paul Haarhuis (quarterfinals)
4. (Australia) Todd Woodbridge / (Australia) Mark Woodforde (quarterfinals)
5. (Netherlands) Tom Nijssen / (Czech Republic) Cyril Suk (third round)
6. (South Africa) David Adams / (Russia) Andrei Olhovskiy (semifinals)
7. (Sweden) Henrik Holm / (Sweden) Anders Järryd (second round)
8. (United States) Patrick McEnroe / (United States) Richey Reneberg (third round)
9. (Netherlands) Hendrik Jan Davids / (South Africa) Pieter Norval (first round)
10. (Germany) Marc-Kevin Goellner / (Spain) Javier Sánchez (second round)
11. (Russia) Yevgeny Kafelnikov / (Czech Republic) David Rikl (second round)
12. (Sweden) Jan Apell / (Sweden) Jonas Björkman (final)
13. (United States) Luke Jensen / (United States) Murphy Jensen (third round)
14. n/a
15. n/a
16. (United States) Ken Flach / (United States) Scott Melville (first round)

== Draw ==
=== Key ===
- Q = Qualifier
- WC = Wild card
- LL = Lucky loser
- Alt = Alternate
- ITF = ITF entry
- PR = Protected ranking
- SR = Special ranking
- SE = Special exempt
- JE = Junior exempt
- JR = Junior Accelerator Programme entrant
- CO = College Accelerator Programme entrant
- NG = Next Gen Accelerator Program entrant
- w/o = Walkover
- r = Retired
- d = Defaulted

=== Finals ===
Quarterfinals
1	(Canada) Grant Connell (United States) Patrick Galbraith	7	5	6
(Spain) Sergio Casal (Spain) Emilio Sánchez	6	7	3
4	(Australia) Todd Woodbridge (Australia) Mark Woodforde	6	3	8
12	(Sweden) Jan Apell (Sweden) Jonas Björkman	3	6	10
6	(South Africa) David Adams (Russia) Andrei Olhovskiy	6	6
3	(Netherlands) Jacco Eltingh (Netherlands) Paul Haarhuis	4	4
(Australia) Wally Masur (United States) David Pate	4	3
2	(Zimbabwe) Byron Black (United States) Jonathan Stark	6	6

Semifinals
1	(Canada) Grant Connell (United States) Patrick Galbraith	7	3	5
12	(Sweden) Jan Apell (Sweden) Jonas Björkman	6	6	7
6	(South Africa) David Adams (Russia) Andrei Olhovskiy	3	3
2	(Zimbabwe) Byron Black (United States) Jonathan Stark	6	6

Final
12	(Sweden) Jan Apell (Sweden) Jonas Björkman	4	6
2	(Zimbabwe) Byron Black (United States) Jonathan Stark	6	7

=== Top half ===
==== Section 1 ====
First round
1	(Canada) G Connell (United States) P Galbraith	6	6
(South Africa) S Kruger (South Africa) M Ondruska	3	2
WC	(France) G Forget (Switzerland) J Hlasek	7	6
(United States) J Sullivan (United States) K Thorne	6	3
(South Africa) M Barnard (South Africa) B Haygarth	6	6
(Germany) D Prinosil (Germany) U Riglewski	2	3
WC	(France) L Barthez (France) S Sansoni	3	4
(Australia) J Eagle (Australia) P Kilderry	6	6
9	(Netherlands) H J Davids (South Africa) P Norval	4	4
(Spain) S Casal (Spain) E Sánchez	6	6
WC	(France) F Santoro (France) G Solvès	4	2
WC	(France) A Beust (France) S Huet	6	6
(South Africa) R Deppe (Australia) L Warder	0	0
(United States) B Pearce (United States) D Randall	6	6
(United States) T Kronemann (United States) R Leach	6	3	9
8	(United States) P McEnroe (United States) R Reneberg	4	6	11

Second round
1	(Canada) G Connell (United States) P Galbraith	6	6
WC	(France) G Forget (Switzerland) J Hlasek	2	3
(South Africa) M Barnard (South Africa) B Haygarth	6	6	4
(Australia) J Eagle (Australia) P Kilderry	3	7	6
(Spain) S Casal (Spain) E Sánchez	6	6
WC	(France) A Beust (France) S Huet	1	2
(United States) B Pearce (United States) D Randall	3	7	4
8	(United States) P McEnroe (United States) R Reneberg	6	6	6

Third round
1	(Canada) G Connell (United States) P Galbraith	6	6
(Australia) J Eagle (Australia) P Kilderry	1	4
(Spain) S Casal (Spain) E Sánchez	6	7
8	(United States) P McEnroe (United States) R Reneberg	3	6

Quarterfinals
1	(Canada) G Connell (United States) P Galbraith	7	5	6
(Spain) S Casal (Spain) E Sánchez	6	7	3

==== Section 2 ====
First round
4	(Australia) T Woodbridge (Australia) M Woodforde	6	6
(United States) A O'Brien (United States) D Witt	2	2
WC	(France) H Leconte (Switzerland) M Rosset	6	4
(Argentina) J I Garat (Venezuela) M Ruah	7	6
(Italy) D Nargiso (Sweden) P Nyborg	6	6
(United States) K Jones (United States) J Waite	2	4
(Latvia) Ģ Dzelde (Sweden) L-A Wahlgren	3	6
13	(United States) L Jensen (United States) M Jensen	6	7
12	(Sweden) J Apell (Sweden) J Björkman	6	7	6
(South Africa) C van Rensburg (South Africa) D Visser	7	6	4
(South Africa) G Muller (Australia) P Rafter	3	4
(Australia) D Cahill (Australia) J Fitzgerald	6	6
(Sweden) R Bergh (Netherlands) M Oosting	6	6
WC	(France) J Golmard (France) L Roux	3	4
(Sweden) M Tillström (Sweden) N Utgren	3	4
5	(Netherlands) T Nijssen (Czech Republic) C Suk	6	6

Second round
4	(Australia) T Woodbridge (Australia) M Woodforde	6	6	6
(Argentina) J I Garat (Venezuela) M Ruah	7	1	2
(Italy) D Nargiso (Sweden) P Nyborg	6	4	3
13	(United States) L Jensen (United States) M Jensen	3	6	6
12	(Sweden) J Apell (Sweden) J Björkman	7	6
(Australia) D Cahill (Australia) J Fitzgerald	6	1
(Sweden) R Bergh (Netherlands) M Oosting	3	4
5	(Netherlands) T Nijssen (Czech Republic) C Suk	6	6

Third round
4	(Australia) T Woodbridge (Australia) M Woodforde	6	6
13	(United States) L Jensen (United States) M Jensen	1	2
12	(Sweden) J Apell (Sweden) J Björkman	6	6
5	(Netherlands) T Nijssen (Czech Republic) C Suk	3	1

Quarterfinals
4	(Australia) T Woodbridge (Australia) M Woodforde	6	3	8
12	(Sweden) J Apell (Sweden) J Björkman	3	6	10

=== Bottom half ===
==== Section 3 ====
First round
6	(South Africa) D Adams (Russia) A Olhovskiy	6	6
(France) A Boetsch (France) O Delaître	3	3
(Argentina) H de la Peña (Mexico) J Lozano	1	2
(Australia) A Kratzmann (Australia) M Kratzmann	6	6
(Brazil) J Oncins (Spain) F Roig	6	1	4
WC	(France) R Gilbert (France) G Raoux	3	6	6
(Spain) T Carbonell (Belgium) L Pimek	2	2
11	(Russia) Y Kafelnikov (Czech Republic) D Rikl	6	6
(Czech Republic) M Damm (Czech Republic) K Nováček	1	7	6
(United States) D Johnson (United States) K Kinnear	6	6	3
(United States) F Montana (United States) J Pugh	6	4	3
(United States) P Annacone (United States) D Flach	4	6	6
(United States) S Cannon (Australia) D Macpherson	6	4
(Argentina) P Albano (The Bahamas) R Smith	7	6
(United States) B Devening (United States) G Van Emburgh	1	1
3	(Netherlands) J Eltingh (Netherlands) P Haarhuis	6	6

Second round
6	(South Africa) D Adams (Russia) A Olhovskiy	6	6
(Australia) A Kratzmann (Australia) M Kratzmann	2	3
WC	(France) R Gilbert (France) G Raoux	6	6
11	(Russia) Y Kafelnikov (Czech Republic) D Rikl	4	4
(Czech Republic) M Damm (Czech Republic) K Nováček	6	3	4
(United States) P Annacone (United States) D Flach	4	6	6
(Argentina) P Albano (The Bahamas) R Smith	6	3
3	(Netherlands) J Eltingh (Netherlands) P Haarhuis	7	6

Third round
6	(South Africa) D Adams (Russia) A Olhovskiy	6	6
WC	(France) R Gilbert (France) G Raoux	3	3
(United States) P Annacone (United States) D Flach	6	6	11
3	(Netherlands) J Eltingh (Netherlands) P Haarhuis	7	2	9

Quarterfinals
6	(South Africa) D Adams (Russia) A Olhovskiy	6	6
3	(Netherlands) J Eltingh (Netherlands) P Haarhuis	4	4

==== Section 4 ====
First round
7	(Sweden) H Holm (Sweden) A Järryd	3	6	6
(United States) M Bauer (South Africa) B Talbot	6	3	4
(Australia) W Masur (United States) D Pate	7	7
(Italy) C Brandi (Italy) F Mordegan	6	6
(United States) J Grabb (United States) J Palmer	1	3
(France) J-P Fleurian (France) S Simian	6	6
(South Africa) J-L de Jager (Zimbabwe) K Ullyett	6	3
10	(Germany) M-K Goellner (Spain) J Sánchez	7	6
16	(United States) K Flach (United States) S Melville	4	4
(Sweden) N Kulti (Sweden) M Larsson	6	6
(South Africa) L Bale (New Zealand) B Steven	7	6
(United States) B Garnett (United States) TJ Middleton	6	3
(South Africa) E Ferreira (United States) M Keil	6	6	6
(United States) B MacPhie (United States) B Shelton	7	4	4
(Argentina) J Frana (Mexico) L Lavalle	2	6
2	(Zimbabwe) B Black (United States) J Stark	6	7

Second round
7	(Sweden) H Holm (Sweden) A Järryd	7	6	5
(Australia) W Masur (United States) D Pate	6	7	7
(France) J-P Fleurian (France) S Simian	6	3	6
10	(Germany) M-K Goellner (Spain) J Sánchez	4	6	3
(Sweden) N Kulti (Sweden) M Larsson	3	6	5
(South Africa) L Bale (New Zealand) B Steven	6	3	7
(South Africa) E Ferreira (United States) M Keil	4	3
2	(Zimbabwe) B Black (United States) J Stark	6	6

Third round
(Australia) W Masur (United States) D Pate	6	1	6
(France) J-P Fleurian (France) S Simian	1	6	4
(South Africa) L Bale (New Zealand) B Steven	7	5	5
2	(Zimbabwe) B Black (United States) J Stark	6	7	7

Quarterfinals
(Australia) W Masur (United States) D Pate	4	3
2	(Zimbabwe) B Black (United States) J Stark	6	6
