= Radomír Vašek =

Czech tennis player (born 1972)

- Country (sports): Czechoslovakia (1990–1992); Czech Republic (1993-)
- Residence: Prostějov, Czech Republic
- Born: 23 September 1972 (age 53) Valašské Meziříčí, Czech Republic
- Height: 1.88 m (6 ft 2 in)
- Turned pro: 1990
- Plays: Right-handed (two-handed backhand)
- Prize money: $418,622

Singles
- Career record: 20–40
- Career titles: 0; 4 Challenger, 1 Futures
- Highest ranking: No. 91 (13 February 1995)

Grand Slam singles results
- Australian Open: 2R (1995)
- French Open: 3R (1994)
- Wimbledon: 2R (1998)
- US Open: 1R (1995)

Doubles
- Career record: 2-6
- Career titles: 0; 8 Challenger, 2 Futures
- Highest ranking: No. 168 (23 August 1999)

Grand Slam doubles results
- US Open: Q1 (1999)
- Last updated on: 7 November 2022.

Radomír Vašek (born 23 September 1972) is a former professional tennis player from the Czech Republic.

== Career ==
Vašek was the Czechoslovak national Under-18s tennis champion in 1990, the same year he turned professional.

At the 1994 French Open he came into the draw as a qualifier but won his first two matches, against Younes El Aynaoui in straight sets and Dimitri Poliakov, from two sets down.

Vašek reached his first and only ATP Tour final in 1995, at the Jakarta Open. Also that year, Vašek made the quarterfinals of the Tel Aviv Open in Israel.

He was a quarterfinalist at Santiago's Movistar Open in 1997.

== ATP career finals ==
=== Singles: 1 (1 runner-up) ===
Legend Grand Slam Tournaments (0–0) ATP World Tour Finals (0–0) ATP Masters Series (0–0) ATP Championship Series (0–0) ATP World Series (0–1)	Finals by surface Hard (0–1) Clay (0–0) Grass (0–0) Carpet (0–0)	Finals by setting Outdoors (0–1) Indoors (0–0)

Result	W–L	Date	Tournament	Tier	Surface	Opponent	Score
Loss	0–1	Jan 1995	Jakarta, Indonesia	World Series	Hard	(Netherlands) Paul Haarhuis	5–7, 5–7

== ATP Challenger and ITF Futures finals ==
=== Singles: 9 (5–4) ===
Legend ATP Challenger (4–4) ITF Futures (1–0)	Finals by surface Hard (0–0) Clay (4–2) Grass (0–0) Carpet (1–2)

Result	W–L	Date	Tournament	Tier	Surface	Opponent	Score
Win	1–0	Aug 1994	Plzeň, Czech Republic	Challenger	Clay	(Czech Republic) Bohdan Ulihrach	2–6, 6–2, 6–2
Loss	1–1	Oct 1994	Dublin, Ireland	Challenger	Carpet	(Germany) David Prinosil	3–6, 3–6
Loss	1–2	Nov 1994	Rogaška, Slovenia	Challenger	Carpet	(Denmark) Frederik Fetterlein	3–6, 4–6
Loss	1–3	May 1997	Bratislava, Slovakia	Challenger	Clay	(France) Sébastien Grosjean	4–6, 1–6
Win	2–3	Aug 1997	Graz, Austria	Challenger	Clay	(Spain) Albert Portas	6–1, 6–3
Win	3–3	Aug 1997	Nettingsdorf, Austria	Challenger	Clay	(Germany) Christian Vinck	6–3, 6–3
Win	4–3	Mar 1999	France F2, Poitiers	Futures	Carpet	(France) Rodolphe Gilbert	6–1, 3–6, 6–3
Win	5–3	Jul 1999	Tampere, Finland	Challenger	Clay	(Austria) Martin Spottl	7–5, 2–6, 6–0
Loss	5–4	Jul 2000	Oberstaufen, Germany	Challenger	Clay	(Austria) Clemens Trimmel	4–6, 1–6

=== Doubles: 12 (10–2) ===
Legend ATP Challenger (8–2) ITF Futures (2–0)	Finals by surface Hard (2–0) Clay (7–2) Grass (0–0) Carpet (1–0)

Result	W–L	Date	Tournament	Tier	Surface	Partner	Opponents	Score
Win	1–0	Jul 1993	Oberstaufen, Germany	Challenger	Clay	(Czech Republic) Ctislav Doseděl	(Germany) Christian Geyer (Germany) Mathias Huning	6–2, 6–2
Win	2–0	May 1994	Sliema, Malta	Challenger	Hard	(France) Lionel Barthez	(South Africa) Clinton Ferreira (United States) Ellis Ferreira	6–2, 3–6, 6–2
Win	3–0	Dec 1994	Prostějov, Czech Republic	Challenger	Carpet	(Czech Republic) Jiří Novák	(Netherlands) Sjeng Schalken (Netherlands) Joost Winnink	6–7, 6–3, 6–4
Loss	3–1	Aug 1997	Plzeň, Czech Republic	Challenger	Clay	(Czech Republic) Radek Štěpánek	(Czech Republic) Petr Pála (Slovenia) Borut Urh	4–2 ret.
Loss	3–2	Aug 1998	Geneva, Switzerland	Challenger	Clay	(Czech Republic) Michal Tabara	(Sweden) Rikard Bergh (Germany) Jens Knippschild	2–6, 6–3, 4–6
Win	4–2	Sep 1998	Szczecin, Poland	Challenger	Clay	(Bulgaria) Orlin Stanoytchev	(Italy) Massimo Ardinghi (Spain) Álex López Morón	7–6, 3–6, 6–4
Win	5–2	Jun 1999	Prague, Czech Republic	Challenger	Clay	(Czech Republic) Michal Tabara	(Czech Republic) Tomáš Cibulec (Czech Republic) Petr Pála	6–2, 6–0
Win	6–2	Jul 1999	Lugano, Switzerland	Challenger	Clay	(Czech Republic) Michal Tabara	(Brazil) Daniel Melo (Brazil) Antonio Prieto	6–2, 3–6, 6–3
Win	7–2	Jul 1999	Tampere, Finland	Challenger	Clay	(Czech Republic) Petr Dezort	(Finland) Jarkko Nieminen (Finland) Timo Nieminen	6–1, 6–1
Win	8–2	Apr 2000	Germany F1, Berlin	Futures	Hard	(Czech Republic) Radek Štěpánek	(Germany) Franz Stauder (Germany) Markus Menzler	5–7, 7–6^{(7–2)}, 6–3
Win	9–2	May 2001	Slovakia F1, Levice	Futures	Clay	(Czech Republic) Petr Dezort	(Slovakia) Tomas Janci (Slovakia) Michal Mertiňák	walkover
Win	10–2	Jul 2001	Budaörs, Hungary	Challenger	Clay	(Czech Republic) Petr Dezort	(Argentina) Sergio Roitman (Argentina) Andrés Schneiter	6–3, 5–7, 7–6^{(8–6)}

== Performance timeline ==
Key
W	F	SF	QF	#R	RR	Q#	DNQ	A	NH

(W) winner; (F) finalist; (SF) semifinalist; (QF) quarterfinalist; (#R) rounds 4, 3, 2, 1; (RR) round-robin stage; (Q#) qualification round; (DNQ) did not qualify; (A) absent; (NH) not held; (SR) strike rate (events won / competed); (W–L) win–loss record.

=== Singles ===
Tournament	1994	1995	1996	1997	1998	1999	2000	SR	W–L	Win %
Grand Slam tournaments
Australian Open	A	2R	A	A	1R	A	A	0 / 2	1–2	33%
French Open	3R	1R	Q1	A	A	Q2	Q1	0 / 2	2–2	50%
Wimbledon	A	1R	A	A	2R	A	Q1	0 / 2	1–2	33%
US Open	A	1R	A	A	A	Q1	A	0 / 1	0–1	0%
Win–loss	2–1	1–4	0–0	0–0	1–2	0–0	0–0	0 / 7	4–7	36%
ATP World Tour Masters 1000
Indian Wells	A	Q1	A	A	A	A	A	0 / 0	0–0	–
Miami	A	2R	A	A	1R	A	A	0 / 2	1–2	33%
Rome	A	A	Q2	A	A	A	A	0 / 0	0–0	–
Win–loss	0–0	1–1	0–0	0–0	0–1	0–0	0–0	0 / 2	1–2	33%
