= Agustín Garizzio =

Argentine tennis player

Agustin Garizzio
- Country (sports): Argentina
- Born: 19 March 1970 (age 55)
- Height: 1.85 m (6 ft 1 in)
- Turned pro: 1989
- Plays: Right-handed
- Prize money: $56,611

Singles
- Career record: 1-2
- Career titles: 0
- Highest ranking: No. 171 (25 May 1998)

Grand Slam singles results
- French Open: 2R (1994)

Agustín Garizzio (born 19 March 1970) is a former professional tennis player from Argentina.

Garizzio made his first appearance on the Grand Prix tennis circuit as an 18-year-old in 1988, at the Buenos Aires event. He lost in the first round to countryman Roberto Azar.

In the 1994 French Open, the only Grand Slam he would participate in, Garizzio beat Gérard Solvès in the opening round, then lost to Olivier Delaître.
