= 1994 French Open – Men's singles =

Men's singles
- 1994 French Open

Final
- Champion: (Spain) Sergi Bruguera
- Runner-up: (Spain) Alberto Berasategui
- Score: 6–3, 7–5, 2–6, 6–1

Details
- Draw: 128
- Seeds: 16

Events
Singles	men	women		boys	girls
Doubles	men	women	mixed	boys	girls
WC Singles	men	women	quad
WC Doubles	men	women	quad
Legends	−45	45+	women
- French Open

Defending champion Sergi Bruguera defeated Alberto Berasategui in the final, 6–3, 7–5, 2–6, 6–1 to win the men's singles tennis title at the 1994 French Open. It was his second and last major singles title. It was the first all-Spanish men's singles final at the event.

Pete Sampras was attempting to complete a non-calendar-year Grand Slam and to become the first man since Rod Laver in 1969 to hold all four major titles at once, having won the preceding Wimbledon Championships, US Open, and Australian Open. However, he lost to Jim Courier in the quarterfinals.

This tournament marked the first professional appearance of future world No. 1 Marcelo Ríos, as well as the first major appearance of future champion Albert Costa. Both players were defeated by Sampras, in the second and first rounds, respectively.

== Seeds ==
1. (United States) Pete Sampras (quarterfinals)
2. (Germany) Michael Stich (second round)
3. (Sweden) Stefan Edberg (first round)
4. (Ukraine) Andrei Medvedev (quarterfinals)
5. (Croatia) Goran Ivanišević (quarterfinals)
6. (Spain) Sergi Bruguera (champion)
7. (United States) Jim Courier (semifinals)
8. (United States) Michael Chang (third round)
9. (United States) Todd Martin (third round)
10. (Germany) ~~Boris Becker~~ (withdrew)
11. (Austria) Thomas Muster (third round)
12. (Czech Republic) Petr Korda (first round)
13. (Sweden) Magnus Gustafsson (second round)
14. (France) Cédric Pioline (second round)
15. (Spain) Carlos Costa (second round)
16. (Netherlands) Richard Krajicek (third round)

== Draw ==
Key

- Q = Qualifier
- WC = Wild card
- LL = Lucky loser
- Alt = Alternate
- ITF = ITF entry
- PR = Protected ranking
- SR = Special ranking
- SE = Special exempt
- JE = Junior exempt
- JR = Junior Accelerator Programme entrant
- CO = College Accelerator Programme entrant
- NG = Next Gen Accelerator Program entrant
- w/o = Walkover
- r = Retired
- d = Defaulted

=== Finals ===
Quarterfinals
1	(United States) Pete Sampras	4	7	4	4
7	(United States) Jim Courier	6	5	6	6
4	(Ukraine) Andrei Medvedev	3	2	5
6	(Spain) Sergi Bruguera	6	6	7
5	(Croatia) Goran Ivanišević	4	3	3
(Spain) Alberto Berasategui	6	6	6
(Sweden) Magnus Larsson	3	6^{1}	7^{7}	6	6
(Germany) Hendrik Dreekmann	6	7^{7}	6^{3}	0	1

Semifinals
7	(United States) Jim Courier	3	7	3	3
6	(Spain) Sergi Bruguera	6	5	6	6
(Spain) Alberto Berasategui	6	6	6
(Sweden) Magnus Larsson	3	4	1

Final
6	(Spain) Sergi Bruguera	6	7	2	6
(Spain) Alberto Berasategui	3	5	6	1

=== Top half ===
==== Section 1 ====
First round
1	(United States) P Sampras	6	6	6
Q	(Spain) A Costa	3	4	4
Q	(Australia) J Eagle	2	3	2
Q	(Chile) M Ríos	6	6	6
(Sweden) M Pernfors	5	2	0^{r}
Q	(Sweden) L Jönsson	7	6	1
(France) H Leconte	4	4	2
(Netherlands) P Haarhuis	6	6	6
Q	(Sweden) M Tillström	6	3	6	6
(Germany) M Zoecke	4	6	3	4
(Russia) A Olhovskiy	6	6	6
(United States) S Bryan	3	3	3
WC	(France) T Champion	4	7	3	7^{7}	9
(Australia) J Morgan	6	5	6	6^{5}	7
(Czech Republic) K Nováček	1	5	5
16	(Netherlands) R Krajicek	6	7	7

Second round
1	(United States) P Sampras	7^{7}	7^{7}	6
Q	(Chile) M Ríos	6^{5}	6^{4}	4
Q	(Sweden) L Jönsson	3	6	6	5	3
(Netherlands) P Haarhuis	6	2	1	7	6
Q	(Sweden) M Tillström	6	7^{7}	6
(Russia) A Olhovskiy	3	6^{2}	4
WC	(France) T Champion	3	3	6	2
16	(Netherlands) R Krajicek	6	6	4	6

Third round
1	(United States) P Sampras	6	6	6
(Netherlands) P Haarhuis	1	4	1
Q	(Sweden) M Tillström	7^{7}	6	6
16	(Netherlands) R Krajicek	6^{4}	2	3

Fourth round
1	(United States) P Sampras	6	6	1	6
Q	(Sweden) M Tillström	4	4	6	4

==== Section 2 ====
First round
LL	(Australia) B Larkham	2	3	7^{7}	3
(United States) J Stark	6	6	6^{4}	6
(Denmark) K Carlsen	6^{3}	3	4
WC	(France) F Santoro	7^{7}	6	6
WC	(France) G Solvès	6	1	2	4
Q	(Argentina) A Garizzio	3	6	6	6
(France) O Delaître	7^{8}	7^{8}	0
(Brazil) L Mattar	6^{6}	6^{6}	0^{r}
(Austria) A Antonitsch	3	4	4
(Czech Republic) S Doseděl	6	6	6
(Sweden) J Björkman	6^{5}	7^{7}	6	3	9
LL	(Argentina) P Arnold	7^{7}	6^{4}	1	6	7
(Italy) S Pescosolido	4	7^{7}	7	6
(Germany) K Braasch	6	6^{4}	5	3
(France) J-P Fleurian	1	4	4
7	(United States) J Courier	6	6	6

Second round
(United States) J Stark	2	2	2
WC	(France) F Santoro	6	6	6
Q	(Argentina) A Garizzio	4	0	6^{4}
(France) O Delaître	6	6	7^{7}
(Czech Republic) S Doseděl	0	5	3
(Sweden) J Björkman	6	7	6
(Italy) S Pescosolido	5	0	7^{9}	4
7	(United States) J Courier	7	6	6^{7}	6

Third round
WC	(France) F Santoro	6	6	6^{8}	4	2
(France) O Delaître	1	3	7^{10}	6	6
(Sweden) J Björkman	3	1	1
7	(United States) J Courier	6	6	6

Fourth round
(France) O Delaître	1	7^{9}	1	6^{6}
7	(United States) J Courier	6	6^{7}	6	7^{8}

==== Section 3 ====
First round
4	(Ukraine) A Medvedev	6	6	6
(Australia) W Masur	2	4	2
(Sweden) N Kulti	6	6	6^{6}	3	6
WC	(France) F Fontang	3	4	7^{8}	6	1
(Germany) M-K Goellner	6^{6}	3	6^{3}
(Canada) G Rusedski	7^{8}	6	7^{7}
Q	(South Africa) M Ondruska	7^{7}	3	2	3
(Russia) A Volkov	6^{3}	6	6	6
(Germany) C-U Steeb	6^{3}	2	3
(Netherlands) J Eltingh	7^{7}	6	6
(United States) D Wheaton	7^{7}	6	6
(Sweden) T Enqvist	6^{5}	0	3
(Czech Republic) D Vacek	7^{7}	0	6	6
(Spain) J Sánchez	6^{3}	6	2	4
(Spain) J Burillo	5	6	5	2
13	(Sweden) M Gustafsson	7	3	7	6

Second round
4	(Ukraine) A Medvedev	6	7^{7}	4	7
(Sweden) N Kulti	4	6^{4}	6	5
(Canada) G Rusedski	7	6	2	6
(Russia) A Volkov	5	3	6	3
(Netherlands) J Eltingh	6	4	7^{7}	6^{4}	6
(United States) D Wheaton	3	6	6^{4}	7^{7}	4
(Czech Republic) D Vacek	0	6	7^{7}	6
13	(Sweden) M Gustafsson	6	4	6^{4}	4

Third round
4	(Ukraine) A Medvedev	2	6	6	3	6
(Canada) G Rusedski	6	3	4	6	2
(Netherlands) J Eltingh	7^{8}	7^{7}	2	6
(Czech Republic) D Vacek	6^{6}	6^{4}	6	3

Fourth round
4	(Ukraine) A Medvedev	6	3	6	6
(Netherlands) J Eltingh	4	6	4	1

==== Section 4 ====
First round
11	(Austria) T Muster	6	7	6
(Russia) A Cherkasov	0	5	1
(United States) A Agassi	6	7	6
WC	(Sweden) M Wilander	2	5	1
(Argentina) F Davín	7^{7}	4	6	4	5
(Australia) P Rafter	6^{5}	6	2	6	7
WC	(France) L Roux	7	6	7^{7}
Q	(Argentina) G Markus	5	1	6^{3}
(Spain) E Sánchez	6	6^{5}	3	6^{4}
LL	(Germany) D Prinosil	2	7^{7}	6	7^{7}
WC	(France) L Barthez	6	6	2	4	2
(Haiti) R Agénor	2	1	6	6	6
(Austria) G Schaller	4	4	2
Q	(Norway) C Ruud	6	6	6
(Czech Republic) M Damm	1	1	6^{3}
6	(Spain) S Bruguera	6	6	7^{7}

Second round
11	(Austria) T Muster	6	6^{5}	7	2	7
(United States) A Agassi	3	7^{7}	5	6	5
(Australia) P Rafter	6	6	6
WC	(France) L Roux	2	4	4
LL	(Germany) D Prinosil	7^{7}	7^{7}	3	4	12
(Haiti) R Agénor	6^{4}	6^{2}	6	6	14
Q	(Norway) C Ruud	2	2	6^{2}
6	(Spain) S Bruguera	6	6	7^{7}

Third round
11	(Austria) T Muster	4	7	3	3
(Australia) P Rafter	6	5	6	6
(Haiti) R Agénor	3	3	3
6	(Spain) S Bruguera	6	6	6

Fourth round
(Australia) P Rafter	4	3	1
6	(Spain) S Bruguera	6	6	6

=== Bottom half ===
==== Section 5 ====
First round
5	(Croatia) G Ivanišević	7^{7}	7^{7}	6
Q	(Germany) J Renzenbrink	6^{5}	6^{5}	2
Q	(United States) M Blackman	6	3	6^{3}	3
(United States) B Shelton	4	6	7^{7}	6
(United States) A O'Brien	6	6^{2}	6^{5}	6	8
(Switzerland) M Rosset	2	7^{7}	7^{7}	3	6
(Spain) A Corretja	6	6	1	5	6
(Brazil) F Meligeni	3	1	6	7	3
(Venezuela) M Ruah	2	3	1
(Slovakia) K Kučera	6	6	6
(France) A Boetsch	6	6	6
(United States) I Lendl	4	3	4
Q	(Italy) C Caratti	2	2	3
(United States) B Gilbert	6	6	6
(Italy) A Gaudenzi	6	5	6^{4}	6	6
12	(Czech Republic) P Korda	2	7	7^{7}	2	2

Second round
5	(Croatia) G Ivanišević	1	6	6	6
(United States) B Shelton	6	1	2	4
(United States) A O'Brien	2	6	2	4
(Spain) A Corretja	6	4	6	6
(Slovakia) K Kučera	2	2	3
(France) A Boetsch	6	6	6
(United States) B Gilbert	5	3	3
(Italy) A Gaudenzi	7	6	6

Third round
5	(Croatia) G Ivanišević	6^{3}	3	6	6	6
(Spain) A Corretja	7^{7}	6	1	2	3
(France) A Boetsch	1	1^{r}
(Italy) A Gaudenzi	6	2

Fourth round
5	(Croatia) G Ivanišević	6	5	6	6
(Italy) A Gaudenzi	2	7	4	3

==== Section 6 ====
First round
14	(France) C Pioline	6	3	6	6
(Switzerland) J Hlasek	4	6	4	3
(South Africa) W Ferreira	3	0^{r}
(Spain) A Berasategui	6	0
(Germany) B Karbacher	7	6	3	4	6
(Spain) T Carbonell	5	2	6	6	0
WC	(France) T Guardiola	6	5	4	6	4
(Russia) Y Kafelnikov	4	7	6	4	6
(Australia) R Fromberg	7^{7}	5	7^{7}	6
(Zimbabwe) B Black	6^{1}	7	6^{5}	1
(Australia) M Woodforde	4	6	6	7^{7}
Q	(Sweden) L-A Wahlgren	6	2	1	6^{2}
(United States) M Washington	5	1	3
(Argentina) J Frana	7	6	6
(Sweden) H Holm	7	7^{7}	6^{2}	6^{8}	6
3	(Sweden) S Edberg	5	6^{1}	7^{7}	7^{10}	4

Second round
14	(France) C Pioline	4	5	3
(Spain) A Berasategui	6	7	6
(Germany) B Karbacher	2	6	2	2
(Russia) Y Kafelnikov	6	1	6	6
(Australia) R Fromberg	2	5	6^{1}
(Australia) M Woodforde	6	7	7^{7}
(Argentina) J Frana	6	6	6
(Sweden) H Holm	4	4	4

Third round
(Spain) A Berasategui	6	6	6
(Russia) Y Kafelnikov	3	2	2
(Australia) M Woodforde	4	6	0	6	8
(Argentina) J Frana	6	3	6	4	10

Fourth round
(Spain) A Berasategui	6	6	0
(Argentina) J Frana	2	0	0^{r}

==== Section 7 ====
First round
8	(United States) M Chang	6	7^{7}	6
(United States) J Grabb	3	6^{1}	1
(Spain) J Arrese	4	6	6	6
(France) R Gilbert	6	3	2	3
(United States) P McEnroe	2	3	2
(Peru) J Yzaga	6	6	6
(Israel) A Mansdorf	4	0	2
(United States) J Palmer	6	6	6
(United States) C Adams	4	6	2	1
(United States) J Tarango	6	3	6	6
(New Zealand) B Steven	2	2	2
(Sweden) M Larsson	6	6	6
(Australia) D Cahill	6	6	4	4	1
(Spain) F Clavet	4	4	6	6	6
(France) S Simian	2	6^{3}	6	1
9	(United States) T Martin	6	7^{7}	3	6

Second round
8	(United States) M Chang	4	6	6	6
(Spain) J Arrese	6	0	4	2
(Peru) J Yzaga	7^{7}	6	4	6
(United States) J Palmer	6^{3}	4	6	1
(United States) J Tarango	2	4	3
(Sweden) M Larsson	6	6	6
(Spain) F Clavet	0	0	2
9	(United States) T Martin	6	6	6

Third round
8	(United States) M Chang	2	3	7	6	5
(Peru) J Yzaga	6	6	5	1	7
(Sweden) M Larsson	6^{6}	6	6	1	6
9	(United States) T Martin	7^{8}	3	0	6	3

Fourth round
(Peru) J Yzaga	3	2	2
(Sweden) M Larsson	6	6	6

==== Section 8 ====
First round
15	(Spain) C Costa	6	7^{7}	6
(France) G Raoux	1	6^{5}	1
Q	(Romania) A Voinea	2	6	5	4
(Germany) H Dreekmann	6	4	7	6
(Czech Republic) D Rikl	6	2
(Russia) A Chesnokov	1	1^{r}
(Australia) J Stoltenberg	6	6	3	3	5
(United States) R Reneberg	1	3	6	6	7
(South Africa) G Stafford	2	6^{4}	4
Q	(Ukraine) D Poliakov	6	7^{7}	6
(Morocco) Y El Aynaoui	3	4	6^{6}
Q	(Czech Republic) R Vašek	6	6	7^{8}
(Argentina) H de la Peña	3	4	1
(United States) A Krickstein	6	6	6
(Italy) R Furlan	1	5	4
2	(Germany) M Stich	6	7	6

Second round
15	(Spain) C Costa	6^{6}	4	4
(Germany) H Dreekmann	7^{8}	6	6
(Czech Republic) D Rikl	6^{7}	1	7	3
(United States) R Reneberg	7^{9}	6	5	6
Q	(Ukraine) D Poliakov	6	6	5	3	1
Q	(Czech Republic) R Vašek	4	2	7	6	6
(United States) A Krickstein	6	6	6
2	(Germany) M Stich	3	3	4

Third round
(Germany) H Dreekmann	4	3	6	6	6
(United States) R Reneberg	6	6	4	4	4
Q	(Czech Republic) R Vašek	3	6	3	3
(United States) A Krickstein	6	1	6	6

Fourth round
(Germany) H Dreekmann	6	6	6
(United States) A Krickstein	4	4	4

Preceded by 1994 Australian Open – Men's singles	Grand Slam men's singles	Succeeded by 1994 Wimbledon Championships – Men's singles
