= 1994 French Open – Women's singles =

Women's singles
- 1994 French Open

Final
- Champion: (Spain) Arantxa Sánchez Vicario
- Runner-up: (France) Mary Pierce
- Score: 6–4, 6–4

Details
- Draw: 128
- Seeds: 16

Events
Singles	men	women		boys	girls
Doubles	men	women	mixed	boys	girls
WC Singles	men	women	quad
WC Doubles	men	women	quad
Legends	−45	45+	women
← 1993 ·	French Open	· 1995 →

Arantxa Sánchez Vicario defeated Mary Pierce in the final, 6–4, 6–4 to win the women's singles tennis title at the 1994 French Open. It was her second French Open title and second major singles title overall. Sánchez Vicario did not lose a set during the tournament. Pierce reached the final with the loss of only 10 games.

Steffi Graf was the defending champion, but lost in the semifinals to Pierce. This ended her winning streak at the majors, having won the last four.

Gabriela Sabatini, a 5-time semifinalist at the French Open, lost in the first round. This would be the first, and only, time she lost before the fourth round of the French Open during her career.

This marked the last major appearance of former world No. 1 and two-time major singles champion Tracy Austin. This also marked the first time that former world No. 1 Martina Navratilova lost in the opening round of a major since 1976.

== Seeds ==
1. (Germany) Steffi Graf (semifinals)
2. (Spain) Arantxa Sánchez Vicario (champion)
3. (Spain) Conchita Martínez (semifinals)
4. (United States) Martina Navratilova (first round)
5. (Czech Republic) Jana Novotná (first round)
6. (Japan) Kimiko Date (first round)
7. (Belarus) Natasha Zvereva (fourth round)
8. (Argentina) Gabriela Sabatini (first round)
9. (United States) Lindsay Davenport (third round)
10. (United States) Mary Joe Fernández (third round)
11. (Germany) Anke Huber (fourth round)
12. (France) Mary Pierce (final)
13. (Bulgaria) Magdalena Maleeva (first round)
14. (United States) Zina Garrison-Jackson (first round)
15. (Czech Republic) Helena Suková (third round)
16. (Germany) Sabine Hack (quarterfinals)

== Draw ==
=== Key ===
- Q = Qualifier
- WC = Wild card
- LL = Lucky loser
- Alt = Alternate
- ITF = ITF entry
- PR = Protected ranking
- SR = Special ranking
- SE = Special exempt
- JE = Junior exempt
- JR = Junior Accelerator Programme entrant
- CO = College Accelerator Programme entrant
- NG = Next Gen Accelerator Program entrant
- w/o = Walkover
- r = Retired
- d = Defaulted

=== Finals ===
Quarterfinals
1	(Germany) Steffi Graf	6	6
(Argentina) Inés Gorrochategui	4	1
(Austria) Petra Ritter	0	2
12	(France) Mary Pierce	6	6
16	(Germany) Sabine Hack	6	0	2
3	(Spain) Conchita Martínez	2	6	6
(France) Julie Halard	1	6^{6}
2	(Spain) Arantxa Sánchez Vicario	6	7^{8}

Semifinals
1	(Germany) Steffi Graf	2	2
12	(France) Mary Pierce	6	6
3	(Spain) Conchita Martínez	3	1
2	(Spain) Arantxa Sánchez Vicario	6	6

Final
12	(France) Mary Pierce	4	4
2	(Spain) Arantxa Sánchez Vicario	6	6

=== Top half ===
==== Section 1 ====
First round
1	(Germany) S Graf	6	6
(Slovakia) K Studeníková	2	2
(Netherlands) S Rottier	6	3	6
(Ukraine) N Medvedeva	2	6	3
Q	(Slovakia) R Zrubáková	6	6
WC	(France) N Herreman	0	1
(Russia) E Maniokova	6	0	3
(South Africa) J Kruger	4	6	6
(France) K Quentrec	6	3	6
(Czech Republic) E Martincová	2	6	4
(Romania) I Spîrlea	6	6
(Czech Republic) K Kroupova	3	1
(Mexico) A Gavaldón	7	6
(Germany) C Singer	5	0
(Slovakia) K Habšudová	4	6	1
10	(United States) MJ Fernandez	6	3	6

Second round
1	(Germany) S Graf	7	6
(Netherlands) S Rottier	5	3
Q	(Slovakia) R Zrubáková	6	5	3
(South Africa) J Kruger	4	7	6
(France) K Quentrec	5	0
(Romania) I Spîrlea	7	6
(Mexico) A Gavaldón	0	1
10	(United States) MJ Fernandez	6	6

Third round
1	(Germany) S Graf	6	4	6
(South Africa) J Kruger	0	6	2
(Romania) I Spîrlea	6	6
10	(United States) MJ Fernandez	4	1

Fourth round
1	(Germany) S Graf	6	6
(Romania) I Spîrlea	0	1

==== Section 2 ====
First round
15	(Czech Republic) H Suková	6	7
(Belgium) L Courtois	3	5
(United Kingdom) C Wood	6	2	6
(United States) G Fernández	3	6	2
(Japan) N Sawamatsu	4	6	6
Q	(Italy) L Garrone	6	4	0
Q	(Australia) M Jaggard-Lai	3	2
(Argentina) I Gorrochategui	6	6
WC	(France) A Olivier	7	4	7
Q	(Germany) K Kschwendt	5	6	9
(United States) K Po	6	6
(France) C Mothes-Jobkel	1	1
(Belgium) D Monami	1	5
(Croatia) I Majoli	6	7
(Italy) S Farina	2	6	6
8	(Argentina) G Sabatini	6	2	4

Second round
15	(Czech Republic) H Suková	2	6	6
(United Kingdom) C Wood	6	3	2
(Japan) N Sawamatsu	5	4
(Argentina) I Gorrochategui	7	6
Q	(Germany) K Kschwendt	2	6	7
(United States) K Po	6	1	5
(Croatia) I Majoli	6	6
(Italy) S Farina	4	1

Third round
15	(Czech Republic) H Suková	6^{8}	6^{1}
(Argentina) I Gorrochategui	7^{10}	7^{7}
Q	(Germany) K Kschwendt	6	3	2
(Croatia) I Majoli	3	6	6

Fourth round
(Argentina) I Gorrochategui	7	6
(Croatia) I Majoli	5	4

==== Section 3 ====
First round
4	(United States) M Navratilova	4	4
(Netherlands) M Oremans	6	6
(Belgium) S Appelmans	6	6
WC	(France) A Castéra	4	1
(Austria) B Reinstadler	5	2
(France) N Tauziat	7	6
(Austria) P Ritter	3	6	11
(United States) L Raymond	6	2	9
(Czech Republic) L Richterová	6	7^{7}
(Austria) B Schett	1	6^{3}
(Japan) K Nagatsuka	4	6	3
(United States) T Whitlinger-Jones	6	2	6
(United States) A Frazier	6	1	5
(Italy) A-M Cecchini	3	6	7
(Romania) R Dragomir	6	7
13	(Bulgaria) M Maleeva	3	5

Second round
(Netherlands) M Oremans	6	1	6
(Belgium) S Appelmans	3	6	4
(France) N Tauziat	3	1
(Austria) P Ritter	6	6
(Czech Republic) L Richterová	6	6
(United States) T Whitlinger-Jones	4	2
(Italy) A-M Cecchini	2	6	1
(Romania) R Dragomir	6	4	6

Third round
(Netherlands) M Oremans	6	2	1
(Austria) P Ritter	4	6	6
(Czech Republic) L Richterová	3	4
(Romania) R Dragomir	6	6

Fourth round
(Austria) P Ritter	7^{7}	4	6
(Romania) R Dragomir	6^{2}	6	0

==== Section 4 ====
First round
12	(France) M Pierce	6	6
(Australia) N Provis	1	0
(Italy) M-F Bentivoglio	4	4
(Canada) P Hy	6	2	r
WC	(France) I Demongeot	2	2
(Netherlands) K Boogert	6	6
(United States) L McNeil	6	6
(Netherlands) C Vis	0	2
(United States) T Austin	0	1
(Germany) M Kochta	6	6
(Bulgaria) K Maleeva	6	6
(United States) L Harvey-Wild	1	4
(Czech Republic) R Bobková	6	5	7
(Australia) R McQuillan	3	7	5
(South Africa) A Coetzer	6	6
6	(Japan) K Date	2	1

Second round
12	(France) M Pierce	6	6
(Italy) M-F Bentivoglio	0	1
(Netherlands) K Boogert	6	1	2
(United States) L McNeil	4	6	6
(Germany) M Kochta	0	6	6
(Bulgaria) K Maleeva	6	3	2
(Czech Republic) R Bobková	4	4
(South Africa) A Coetzer	6	6

Third round
12	(France) M Pierce	6	6
(United States) L McNeil	0	0
(Germany) M Kochta	0	3
(South Africa) A Coetzer	6	6

Fourth round
12	(France) M Pierce	6	6
(South Africa) A Coetzer	1	1

=== Bottom half ===
==== Section 5 ====
First round
5	(Czech Republic) J Novotná	4	2
(Israel) A Smashnova	6	6
(United States) S Stafford	6	6
(Russia) E Makarova	2	1
(United States) A Grossman	6	6
LL	(Spain) Á Montolio	2	1
Q	(Argentina) B Fulco-Villella	5	6	3
(Czech Republic) P Langrová	7	2	6
(China) Li F	6^{6}	6	6
(Canada) H Kelesi	7^{8}	1	3
(Netherlands) N Krijger-Jagerman	3	5
(France) A Fusai	6	7
(Ukraine) E Brioukhovets	6	6
(Netherlands) M Bollegraf	4	3
(Argentina) MJ Gaidano	2	1
16	(Germany) S Hack	6	6

Second round
(Israel) A Smashnova	4	1
(United States) S Stafford	6	6
(United States) A Grossman	3	6	6
(Czech Republic) P Langrová	6	4	3
(China) Li F	0	2
(France) A Fusai	6	6
(Ukraine) E Brioukhovets	2	6	1
16	(Germany) S Hack	6	3	6

Third round
(United States) S Stafford	6^{4}	6	6
(United States) A Grossman	7^{7}	3	3
(France) A Fusai	0	7^{7}	1
16	(Germany) S Hack	6	6^{3}	6

Fourth round
(United States) S Stafford	4	2
16	(Germany) S Hack	6	6

==== Section 6 ====
First round
14	(United States) Z Garrison-Jackson	3	6	2
(Germany) S Frankl	6	4	6
(Italy) M Grossi	6	6
(United States) C Kuhlman	4	4
WC	(France) A Dechaume-Balleret	6	6
(Switzerland) E Zardo	3	1
(Germany) W Probst	6	6
WC	(France) C Lucarelli	4	1
(United States) P Shriver	3	2
(United States) M Werdel	6	6
Q	(Argentina) P Suárez	1	1
(Netherlands) B Schultz	6	6
(South Africa) E Reinach	6	4	3
(United States) G Helgeson	4	6	6
(Latvia) L Neiland	2	3
3	(Spain) C Martínez	6	6

Second round
(Germany) S Frankl	3	1
(Italy) M Grossi	6	6
WC	(France) A Dechaume-Balleret	7^{7}	6
(Germany) W Probst	6^{2}	2
(United States) M Werdel	4	6^{9}
(Netherlands) B Schultz	6	7^{11}
(United States) G Helgeson	2	3
3	(Spain) C Martínez	6	6

Third round
(Italy) M Grossi	3	2
WC	(France) A Dechaume-Balleret	6	6
(Netherlands) B Schultz	5	3
3	(Spain) C Martínez	7	6

Fourth round
WC	(France) A Dechaume-Balleret	1	2
3	(Spain) C Martínez	6	6

==== Section 7 ====
First round
7	(Belarus) N Zvereva	6	6
(Indonesia) R Tedjakusuma	0	1
(Austria) J Wiesner	7	6
LL	(Netherlands) P Kamstra	5	1
(Japan) Y Kamio	1	3
Q	(Germany) S Meier	6	6
(Sweden) Å Carlsson	5	6^{2}
(Chinese Taipei) Wang S-t	7	7^{7}
Q	(Germany) P Begerow	6	4	9
(United States) M McGrath	2	6	7
(Argentina) P Tarabini	3	2
(France) J Halard	6	6
LL	(Poland) K Nowak	6	6
WC	(France) L Ghirardi	4	2
(United States) C Rubin	7^{7}	4	3
9	(United States) L Davenport	6^{2}	6	6

Second round
7	(Belarus) N Zvereva	7	7
(Austria) J Wiesner	5	5
Q	(Germany) S Meier	4	2
(Chinese Taipei) Wang S-t	6	6
Q	(Germany) P Begerow	5	6	4
(France) J Halard	7	4	6
LL	(Poland) K Nowak	4	2
9	(United States) L Davenport	6	6

Third round
7	(Belarus) N Zvereva	6	6
(Chinese Taipei) Wang S-t	2	1
(France) J Halard	6	6
9	(United States) L Davenport	4	2

Fourth round
7	(Belarus) N Zvereva	6^{2}	5
(France) J Halard	7^{7}	7

==== Section 8 ====
First round
11	(Germany) A Huber	7^{7}	6
(France) S Testud	6^{2}	3
(Germany) M Babel	6	6
(United States) P Fendick	3	4
LL	(Romania) C Cristea	2	6	4
(Georgia (country)) L Meskhi	6	4	6
(United States) S Cacic	6	6
(Japan) M Endo	3	4
(Australia) K Radford	1	2
(Germany) B Rittner	6	6
(Italy) L Golarsa	3	6	1
(Austria) S Dopfer	6	3	6
(France) N van Lottum	6	6
(Italy) L Ferrando	2	2
(Argentina) F Labat	4	1
2	(Spain) A Sánchez Vicario	6	6

Second round
11	(Germany) A Huber	7^{7}	6
(Germany) M Babel	6^{5}	2
(Georgia (country)) L Meskhi	7^{7}	4	7
(United States) S Cacic	6^{3}	6	5
(Germany) B Rittner	6	6
(Austria) S Dopfer	2	3
(France) N van Lottum	1	0
2	(Spain) A Sánchez Vicario	6	6

Third round
11	(Germany) A Huber	6	6
(Georgia (country)) L Meskhi	1	4
(Germany) B Rittner	4	2
2	(Spain) A Sánchez Vicario	6	6

Fourth round
11	(Germany) A Huber	3	2
2	(Spain) A Sánchez Vicario	6	6

Preceded by 1994 Australian Open – Women's singles	Grand Slam women's singles	Succeeded by 1994 Wimbledon Championships – Women's singles
