= 1994 French Open – Mixed doubles =

Mixed doubles
- 1994 French Open

Final
- Champions: (Netherlands) Kristie Boogert (Netherlands) Menno Oosting
- Runners-up: (Latvia) Larisa Neiland (Russia) Andrei Olhovskiy
- Score: 7–5, 3–6, 7–5

Details
- Draw: 48
- Seeds: 16

Events
Singles	men	women		boys	girls
Doubles	men	women	mixed	boys	girls
WC Singles	men	women	quad
WC Doubles	men	women	quad
Legends	−45	45+	women
- French Open

The 1994 French Open was a tennis tournament that took place on the outdoor clay courts at the Stade Roland Garros in Paris, France. The tournament was held from 23 May until 5 June. It was the 93rd staging of the French Open, and the second Grand Slam tennis event of 1994.

== Seeds ==
Champion seeds are indicated in bold text while text in italics indicates the round in which those seeds were eliminated.

1. (Canada) Grant Connell / (Belarus) Natasha Zvereva (second round)
2. (Czech Republic) Cyril Suk / (United States) Gigi Fernández (quarterfinals)
3. (Australia) Todd Woodbridge / (Czech Republic) Helena Suková (semifinals)
4. (Zimbabwe) Byron Black / (United States) Pam Shriver (second round)
5. (Australia) Mark Woodforde / (United States) Martina Navratilova (third round)
6. (Netherlands) Tom Nijssen / (Netherlands) Manon Bollegraf (second round)
7. (Russia) Andrei Olhovskiy / (Latvia) Larisa Neiland (final)
8. (United States) Patrick Galbraith / (Canada) Jill Hetherington (quarterfinals)
9. (South Africa) David Adams / (United States) Katrina Adams (second round)
10. (United States) Rick Leach / (United States) Lisa Raymond (third round)
11. (Netherlands) Paul Haarhuis / (Ukraine) Natalia Medvedeva (quarterfinals)
12. (Spain) Javier Sánchez / (Argentina) Inés Gorrochategui (third round)
13. (Spain) Sergio Casal / (Spain) Arantxa Sánchez Vicario (third round)
14. (United States) Scott Melville / (United States) Meredith McGrath (semifinals)
15. (Spain) Emilio Sánchez / (Australia) Rennae Stubbs (second round)
16. (United States) Ken Flach / (New Zealand) Julie Richardson (second round)

== Draw ==
Key

- Q = Qualifier
- WC = Wild card
- LL = Lucky loser
- Alt = Alternate
- ITF = ITF entry
- PR = Protected ranking
- SR = Special ranking
- SE = Special exempt
- JE = Junior exempt
- JR = Junior Accelerator Programme entrant
- CO = College Accelerator Programme entrant
- NG = Next Gen Accelerator Program entrant
- w/o = Walkover
- r = Retired
- d = Defaulted

=== Finals ===
Quarterfinals
(Netherlands) Menno Oosting (Netherlands) Kristie Boogert	3	7	6
8	(United States) Patrick Galbraith (Canada) Jill Hetherington	6	5	2
(South Africa) Lan Bale (South Africa) Amanda Coetzer	4	4
14	(United States) Scott Melville (United States) Meredith McGrath	6	6
11	(Netherlands) Paul Haarhuis (Ukraine) Natalia Medvedeva	5	7	2
3	(Australia) Todd Woodbridge (Czech Republic) Helena Suková	7	5	6
7	(Russia) Andrei Olhovskiy (Latvia) Larisa Neiland	7	6
2	(Czech Republic) Cyril Suk (United States) Gigi Fernández	5	3

Semifinals
(Netherlands) Menno Oosting (Netherlands) Kristie Boogert	0	6	6
14	(United States) Scott Melville (United States) Meredith McGrath	6	2	3
3	(Australia) Todd Woodbridge (Czech Republic) Helena Suková	6^{5}	2
7	(Russia) Andrei Olhovskiy (Latvia) Larisa Neiland	7	6

Finals
(Netherlands) Menno Oosting (Netherlands) Kristie Boogert	7	3	7
7	(Russia) Andrei Olhovskiy (Latvia) Larisa Neiland	5	6	5

=== Top half ===
==== Section 1 ====
First round
(Netherlands) M Oosting (Netherlands) K Boogert	6	3	8
(South Africa) J-L de Jager (South Africa) M de Swardt	4	6	6
(Australia) L Warder (Australia) K-A Guse	7	6
(United States) B Pearce (United States) L Wild	5	1
(Australia) J Eagle (United States) E deLone	6	6
(United States) K Kinnear (Japan) N Miyagi	1	3
(United States) S Cannon (United States) S Stafford	7	7
(United States) M Keil (Germany) C Schneider	6^{3}	5

Second round
1	(Canada) G Connell (Belarus) N Zvereva	2	6^{5}
(Netherlands) M Oosting (Netherlands) K Boogert	6	7
(Australia) L Warder (Australia) K-A Guse	6	3	5
10	(United States) R Leach (United States) L Raymond	2	6	7
16	(United States) K Flach (New Zealand) J Richardson	6^{3}	4
(Australia) J Eagle (United States) E deLone	7	6
(United States) S Cannon (United States) S Stafford	6	4	3
8	(United States) P Galbraith (Canada) J Hetherington	4	6	6

Third round
(Netherlands) M Oosting (Netherlands) K Boogert	6	6
10	(United States) R Leach (United States) L Raymond	4	4
(Australia) J Eagle (United States) E deLone	4	6	2
8	(United States) P Galbraith (Canada) J Hetherington	6	3	6

Quarterfinals
(Netherlands) M Oosting (Netherlands) K Boogert	3	7	6
8	(United States) P Galbraith (Canada) J Hetherington	6	5	2

==== Section 2 ====
First round
(South Africa) l Bale (South Africa) A Coetzer	6	6
WC	(France) G Solvès (France) N van Lottum	2	3
(South Africa) P Norval (Netherlands) C Vis	6	4	6
(United States) M Bauer (United States) S V	3	6	2
WC	(France) H Leconte (Germany) S Graf	7	6
WC	(France) J-P Fleurian (France) S Niox-Château	6^{6}	1
(Mexico) J Lozano (United States) L McNeil	7	6
(South Africa) E Ferreira (Belgium) S Appelmans	5	3

Second round
4	(Zimbabwe) B Black (United States) P Shriver	3	6	2
(South Africa) l Bale (South Africa) A Coetzer	6	2	6
(South Africa) P Norval (Netherlands) C Vis	4	6^{4}
12	(Spain) Javier Sánchez (Argentina) I Gorrochategui	6	7
14	(United States) S Melville (United States) M McGrath	6	1	10
WC	(France) H Leconte (Germany) S Graf	2	6	8
(Mexico) J Lozano (United States) L McNeil	6	6
6	(Netherlands) T Nijssen (Netherlands) M Bollegraf	2	4

Third round
(South Africa) l Bale (South Africa) A Coetzer	1	6	6
12	(Spain) J Sánchez (Argentina) I Gorrochategui	6	2	4
14	(United States) S Melville (United States) M McGrath	6^{5}	7	13
(Mexico) J Lozano (United States) L McNeil	7	6^{4}	11

Quarterfinals
(South Africa) l Bale (South Africa) A Coetzer	4	4
14	(United States) S Melville (United States) M McGrath	6	6

=== Bottom half ===
==== Section 3 ====
First round
(United States) T Kronemann (United States) P Fendick	6	2	6
(Sweden) L-A Wahlgren (Croatia) M Murić	2	6	3
(United States) F Montana (United States) Z Garrison	6	6
(Belgium) L Pimek (Australia) J Byrne	1	3
(United States) J Pugh (Australia) K Kunce	4	6	8
(United States) M Jensen (Netherlands) B Schultz	6	2	6
(Australia) A Kratzmann (Australia) J-A Faull	2	7	6
(South Africa) B Talbot (Argentina) M Paz	6	5	1

Second round
5	(Australia) M Woodforde (United States) M Navratilova	6	6^{5}	7
(United States) T Kronemann (United States) P Fendick	2	7	5
(United States) F Montana (United States) Z Garrison	6^{8}	4
11	(Netherlands) P Haarhuis (Ukraine) N Medvedeva	7	6
9	(South Africa) D Adams (United States) K Adams	1	5
(United States) J Pugh (Australia) K Kunce	6	7
(Australia) A Kratzmann (Australia) J-A Faull	2	6^{2}
3	(Australia) T Woodbridge (Czech Republic) H Suková	6	7

Third round
5	(Australia) M Woodforde (United States) M Navratilova	7	4	5
11	(Netherlands) P Haarhuis (Ukraine) N Medvedeva	6^{2}	6	7
(United States) J Pugh (Australia) K Kunce	0	5
3	(Australia) T Woodbridge (Czech Republic) H Suková	6	7

Quarterfinals
11	(Netherlands) P Haarhuis (Ukraine) N Medvedeva	5	7	2
3	(Australia) T Woodbridge (Czech Republic) H Suková	7	5	6

==== Section 4 ====
First round
(United States) L Jensen (France) M Pierce	6	7
WC	(Iran) M Bahrami (France) K Quentrec	4	5
(United States) K Jones (Australia) M Jaggard-Lai	7	6
(Australia) M Kratzmann (Australia) R McQuillan	6^{3}	4
(Australia) J Fitzgerald (Australia) L Smylie	6	4	6
(South Africa) R Deppe (France) I Demongeot	1	6	1
(United States) D Randall (Australia) C Barclay	7	6
(South Africa) D Visser (South Africa) E Reinach	5	2

Second round
7	(Russia) A Olhovskiy (Latvia) L Neiland	6	6
(United States) L Jensen (France) M Pierce	3	3
(United States) K Jones (Australia) M Jaggard-Lai	7	6
15	(Spain) E Sánchez (Australia) R Stubbs	6^{1}	4
13	(Spain) S Casal (Spain) A Sánchez Vicario	6	4	6
(Australia) J Fitzgerald (Australia) L Smylie	3	6	2
(United States) D Randall (Australia) C Barclay	3	4
2	(Czech Republic) C Suk (United States) G Fernández	6	6

Third round
7	(Russia) A Olhovskiy (Latvia) L Neiland	w/o
(United States) K Jones (Australia) M Jaggard-Lai
13	(Spain) S Casal (Spain) A Sánchez Vicario	6^{5}	6^{6}
2	(Czech Republic) C Suk (United States) G Fernández	7	7

Quarterfinals
7	(Russia) A Olhovskiy (Latvia) L Neiland	7	6
2	(Czech Republic) C Suk (United States) G Fernández	5	3
