= 1994 French Open – Women's doubles =

Tennis tournament

Women's doubles
- 1994 French Open

Final
- Champion: (United States) Gigi Fernández (Belarus) Natasha Zvereva
- Runner-up: (United States) Lindsay Davenport (United States) Lisa Raymond
- Score: 6–2, 6–2

Details
- Draw: 64 (4 WC )
- Seeds: 16

Events
Singles	men	women		boys	girls
Doubles	men	women	mixed	boys	girls
WC Singles	men	women	quad
WC Doubles	men	women	quad
Legends	−45	45+	women
← 1993 ·	French Open	· 1995 →

Gigi Fernández and Natasha Zvereva were the two-time defending champions, and successfully defended their title, defeating Lindsay Davenport and Lisa Raymond in the final 6–2, 6–2.

== Seeds ==
Champion seeds are indicated in bold text while text in italics indicates the round in which those seeds were eliminated.

1. (United States) **Gigi Fernández** / (Belarus) **Natasha Zvereva (champions)**
2. (Czech Republic) Jana Novotná / (Spain) Arantxa Sánchez Vicario (withdrew)
3. (United States) Patty Fendick / (United States) Meredith McGrath (third round)
4. (Netherlands) Manon Bollegraf / (United States) Martina Navratilova (third round)
5. (United States) Pam Shriver / (Australia) Liz Smylie (second round)
6. (United States) Katrina Adams / (Czech Republic) Helena Suková (first round)
7. (United States) Lori McNeil / (Australia) Rennae Stubbs (first round)
8. (United States) Mary Joe Fernández / (United States) Zina Garrison (third round)
9. (South Africa) Amanda Coetzer / (Argentina) Inés Gorrochategui (semifinals)
10. (Ukraine) Natalia Medvedeva / (Latvia) Larisa Neiland (quarterfinals)
11. (United States) Lindsay Davenport / (United States) Lisa Raymond (final)
12. (Italy) Sandra Cecchini / (Argentina) Patricia Tarabini (third round)
13. (Canada) Jill Hetherington / (United States) Shaun Stafford (first round)
14. (Italy) Laura Golarsa / (Argentina) Mercedes Paz (second round)
15. (France) Julie Halard / (France) Nathalie Tauziat (semifinals)
16. (Australia) Jenny Byrne / (Australia) Rachel McQuillan (third round)

== Draw ==
=== Key ===
- Q = Qualifier
- WC = Wild card
- LL = Lucky loser
- Alt = Alternate
- SE = Special exempt
- PR = Protected ranking
- ITF = ITF entry
- JE = Junior exempt
- w/o = Walkover
- r = Retired
- d = Defaulted
- SR = Special ranking

=== Finals ===
Quarterfinals
1	(United States) Gigi Fernández (Belarus) Natasha Zvereva	6	6
(Italy) Silvia Farina (United States) Ginger Helgeson	3	2
15	(France) Julie Halard (France) Nathalie Tauziat	6	4	6
10	(Ukraine) Natalia Medvedeva (Latvia) Larisa Neiland	2	6	4
(Russia) Eugenia Maniokova (Georgia (country)) Leila Meskhi	5	3
9	(South Africa) Amanda Coetzer (Argentina) Inés Gorrochategui	7	6
11	(United States) Lindsay Davenport (United States) Lisa Raymond	6	6
(Australia) Nicole Bradtke (South Africa) Elna Reinach	1	0

Semifinals
1	(United States) Gigi Fernández (Belarus) Natasha Zvereva	4	6	6
15	(France) Julie Halard (France) Nathalie Tauziat	6	2	4
11	(United States) Lindsay Davenport (United States) Lisa Raymond	7	6^{6}	6
9	(South Africa) Amanda Coetzer (Argentina) Inés Gorrochategui	6^{2}	7	4

Final
1	(United States) Gigi Fernández (Belarus) Natasha Zvereva	6	6
11	(United States) Lindsay Davenport (United States) Lisa Raymond	2	2

=== Top half ===
==== Section 1 ====
First round
1	(United States) G Fernández (Belarus) N Zvereva	6	7
(United States) C Benjamin (Romania) R Dragomir	1	5
(United States) A Grossman (Netherlands) C Vis	7	3	7
WC	(France) K Quentrec (France) S Testud	6^{4}	6	5
(Australia) C Barclay (Australia) K-A Guse	6	4	10
(Australia) J-A Faull (South Africa) T Price	4	6	8
12	(Italy) S Cecchini (Argentina) P Tarabini	7	6
(Germany) M Babel (Germany) K Kschwendt	6^{6}	3
14	(Italy) L Golarsa (Argentina) M Paz	6	6
(Australia) T Morton (Poland) K Teodorowicz	1	2
(Germany) W Probst (Germany) C Singer	6	6
WC	(Spain) C Martínez (Austria) J Wiesner	4	1
(France) A Dechaume-Balleret (Argentina) F Labat	6	6
(United Kingdom) V Lake (United Kingdom) C Wood	2	1
(Italy) S Farina (United States) G Helgeson	6	0	6
6	(United States) K Adams (Czech Republic) H Suková	4	6	3

Second round
1	(United States) G Fernández (Belarus) N Zvereva	6	6
(United States) A Grossman (Netherlands) C Vis	3	4
(Australia) C Barclay (Australia) K-A Guse	0	4
12	(Italy) S Cecchini (Argentina) P Tarabini	6	6
14	(Italy) L Golarsa (Argentina) M Paz	2	5
(Germany) W Probst (Germany) C Singer	6	7
(France) A Dechaume-Balleret (Argentina) F Labat	3	6	3
(Italy) S Farina (United States) G Helgeson	6	4	6

Third round
1	(United States) G Fernández (Belarus) N Zvereva	6	6
12	(Italy) S Cecchini (Argentina) P Tarabini	3	1
(Germany) W Probst (Germany) C Singer	6^{4}	2
(Italy) S Farina (United States) G Helgeson	7	6

Quarterfinals
1	(United States) G Fernández (Belarus) N Zvereva	6	6
(Italy) S Farina (United States) G Helgeson	3	2

==== Section 2 ====
First round
4	(Netherlands) M Bollegraf (United States) M Navratilova	6	6
(Netherlands) I Driehuis (Mexico) L Novelo	1	4
(Australia) K Radford (New Zealand) J Richardson	6	7
(Australia) M Jaggard-Lai (United States) M Werdel	3	5
(Germany) A Huber (Netherlands) M Oremans	6	7
(United States) L Harvey-Wild (United States) C Rubin	3	5
15	(France) J Halard (France) N Tauziat	6	6
(Croatia) I Majoli (Germany) B Rittner	2	1
10	(Ukraine) N Medvedeva (Latvia) L Neiland	6	6
(Argentina) B Fulco-Villella (Japan) R Hiraki	2	4
(Czech Republic) K Hrdličková (Czech Republic) E Melicharová	7	6
(Romania) C Cristea (United States) S Reece	6^{1}	3
(United States) S Collins (South Africa) M de Swardt	7	6
(Slovakia) K Habšudová (Slovakia) R Zrubáková	5	3
8	(United States) MJ Fernández (United States) Z Garrison	6	6
(Austria) S Dopfer (Germany) M Zivec-Skulj	1	1

Second round
4	(Netherlands) M Bollegraf (United States) M Navratilova	6	3	6
(Australia) K Radford (New Zealand) J Richardson	1	6	0
(Germany) A Huber (Netherlands) M Oremans	3	3
15	(France) J Halard (France) N Tauziat	6	6
10	(Ukraine) N Medvedeva (Latvia) L Neiland	6	6
(Czech Republic) K Hrdličková (Czech Republic) E Melicharová	4	2
(United States) S Collins (South Africa) M de Swardt	3	1
8	(United States) MJ Fernández (United States) Z Garrison	6	6

Third round
4	(Netherlands) M Bollegraf (United States) M Navratilova	6	6^{3}	3
15	(France) J Halard (France) N Tauziat	2	7	6
10	(Ukraine) N Medvedeva (Latvia) L Neiland	6	6
8	(United States) MJ Fernández (United States) Z Garrison	4	3

Quarterfinals
15	(France) J Halard (France) N Tauziat	6	4	6
10	(Ukraine) N Medvedeva (Latvia) L Neiland	2	6	4

=== Bottom half ===
==== Section 3 ====
First round
5	(United States) P Shriver (Australia) L Smylie	6	3	8
(Ukraine) E Brioukhovets (Russia) E Makarova	4	6	6
(Russia) E Maniokova (Georgia (country)) L Meskhi	2	6	6
WC	(France) S Amiach (France) C Suire	6	1	3
(Sweden) M Strandlund (Slovakia) D Szabová	6	3	7
(Austria) P Ritter (France) N van Lottum	3	6	5
16	(Australia) J Byrne (Australia) R McQuillan	6	6
(Sweden) Å Carlsson (Finland) N Dahlman	1	1
9	(South Africa) A Coetzer (Argentina) I Gorrochategui	3	6	6
(Japan) E Iida (Japan) N Miyagi	6	3	3
(United States) A Frazier (United States) K Po	6	6
(Hong Kong) K Godridge (China) F Li	1	2
(Spain) V Ruano Pascual (Romania) I Spîrlea	6	6
WC	(France) A Olivier (France) S Sabas	0	3
3	(United States) P Fendick (United States) M McGrath	6	6
(Bulgaria) K Maleeva (Bulgaria) M Maleeva	1	2

Second round
5	(United States) P Shriver (Australia) L Smylie	4	3
5	(Russia) E Maniokova (Georgia (country)) L Meskhi	6	6
(Sweden) M Strandlund (Slovakia) D Szabová	3	5
16	(Australia) J Byrne (Australia) R McQuillan	6	7
9	(South Africa) A Coetzer (Argentina) I Gorrochategui	7	6
(United States) A Frazier (United States) K Po-Messerli	6^{2}	3
(Spain) V Ruano Pascual (Romania) I Spîrlea	1	2
3	(United States) P Fendick (United States) M McGrath	6	6

Third round
(Russia) E Maniokova (Georgia (country)) L Meskhi	7	6
16	(Australia) J Byrne (Australia) R McQuillan	5	3
9	(South Africa) A Coetzer (Argentina) I Gorrochategui	6	6
3	(United States) P Fendick (United States) M McGrath	1	3

Quarterfinals
(Russia) E Maniokova (Georgia (country)) L Meskhi	5	3
9	(South Africa) A Coetzer (Argentina) I Gorrochategui	7	6

==== Section 4 ====
First round
7	(United States) L McNeil (Australia) R Stubbs	6	6
(France) I Demongeot (Belgium) D Monami	3	2
(France) A Fusai (Poland) M Mróz	6	6
(Croatia) M Murić (United States) B Nagelsen	2	4
(Australia) D Jones (Japan) Y Kamio	7	6
(Japan) A Kijimuta (Japan) N Kijimuta	5	2
11	(United States) L Davenport (United States) L Raymond	2	6	6
(Belgium) S Appelmans (Belgium) L Courtois	6	2	1
(Netherlands) K Boogert (Netherlands) N Muns-Jagerman	3	7	6
13	(Canada) J Hetherington (United States) S Stafford	6	5	3
(Argentina) G Sabatini (Netherlands) B Schultz-McCarthy	6	6
(Czech Republic) R Bobková (Czech Republic) P Langrová	3	3
(Australia) N Provis (South Africa) E Reinach	6	6
(Germany) S Hack (Germany) C Schneider	0	2
(Ukraine) O Lugina (Bulgaria) E Wagner	6	7
Alt	(United States) S Gilchrist (United States) V Paynter	2	6^{4}

Second round
7	(United States) L McNeil (Australia) R Stubbs	6	6
(France) A Fusai (Poland) M Mróz	0	2
(Australia) D Jones (Japan) Y Kamio	6^{1}	5
11	(United States) L Davenport (United States) L Raymond	7	7
(Netherlands) K Boogert (Netherlands) N Muns-Jagerman	6	5	2
(Argentina) G Sabatini (Netherlands) B Schultz-McCarthy	3	7	6
(Australia) N Provis (South Africa) E Reinach	6	6
(Ukraine) O Lugina (Bulgaria) E Wagner	4	3

Third round
7	(United States) L McNeil (Australia) R Stubbs	1	3
11	(United States) L Davenport (United States) L Raymond	6	6
(Argentina) G Sabatini (Netherlands) B Schultz-McCarthy	4	5
(Australia) N Provis (South Africa) E Reinach	6	7

Quarterfinals
11	(United States) L Davenport (United States) L Raymond	6	6
(Australia) N Provis (South Africa) E Reinach	1	0
