= Lars-Anders Wahlgren =

Swedish tennis player

- Country (sports): Sweden
- Residence: Angelholm, Sweden
- Born: 24 August 1966 (age 59) Lund, Sweden
- Height: 1.93 m (6 ft 4 in)
- Turned pro: 1985
- Plays: Right-handed
- Prize money: $464,310

Singles
- Career record: 23–50
- Career titles: 0
- Highest ranking: No. 66 (29 January 1990)

Grand Slam singles results
- Australian Open: 3R (1990, 1992)
- French Open: 2R (1987)
- Wimbledon: 1R (1990)
- US Open: 1R (1994)

Doubles
- Career record: 41–69
- Career titles: 0
- Highest ranking: No. 86 (31 July 1995)

Grand Slam doubles results
- Australian Open: 3R (1995)
- French Open: 1R (1987, 1989, 1994, 1995)
- Wimbledon: 1R (1995)
- US Open: 2R (1994)

Grand Slam mixed doubles results
- French Open: 1R (1994, 1995)
- Wimbledon: 1R (1995)

Lars-Anders Wahlgren (born 24 August 1966) is a former professional tennis player from Sweden.

== Career ==
Wahlgren was a top 100 player in both the singles and doubles.

He won his first Grand Slam match at the 1987 French Open, beating Guy Forget.

In 1989 he had his best singles performance in an ATP Tour event, reaching the final of the Australian Indoor Championships. He defeated defending champion Slobodan Živojinović en route to the final, where he lost to Ivan Lendl.

He reached the quarter-finals of Wellington's BP National Championship – Singles in 1990 and also made the third round of the Men's Singles at the Australian Open that year.

Wahlgren upset 15th Marc Rosset in the opening round of the 1991 Australian Open but didn't progress any further. He won the match 9–7 in the fifth set.

The following year he equaled his effort from 1990, again reaching third round in Australia. On this occasion he beat world number 20 Brad Gilbert and 12th seed Derrick Rostagno.

Wahlgren was a quarter-finalist at the 1992 Brisbane Indoor Championships. Over the next two years, he twice finished runner-up in doubles at the Kuala Lumpur Open.

The further he got in the Men's Doubles at a Grand Slam was at the 1995 Australian Open, when he and partner Ola Kristiansson made it into the third round, defeating sixth seeds David Adams and Andrei Olhovskiy along the way.

== Grand Prix/ATP career finals ==
=== Singles: 1 (0–1) ===
Result	No.	Year	Tournament	Surface	Opponent	Score
Loss	1.	1989	Sydney, Australia	Hard	(Czechoslovakia) Ivan Lendl	2–6, 2–6, 1–6

=== Doubles: 2 (0–2) ===
Result	No.	Year	Tournament	Surface	Partner	Opponents	Score
Loss	1.	1993	Kuala Lumpur, Malaysia	Hard	(Sweden) Jonas Björkman	(Netherlands) Jacco Eltingh (Netherlands) Paul Haarhuis	5–7, 6–4, 6–7
Loss	2.	1994	Kuala Lumpur, Malaysia	Carpet	(Sweden) Nicklas Kulti	(Netherlands) Jacco Eltingh (Netherlands) Paul Haarhuis	0–6, 5–7

== Challenger titles ==
=== Singles: (1) ===
No.	Year	Tournament	Surface	Opponent	Score
1.	1986	Athens, Greece	Hard	(West Germany) Hans-Dieter Beutel	6–4, 6–3

=== Doubles: (12) ===
No.	Year	Tournament	Surface	Partner	Opponents	Score
1.	1987	Martinique, French West Indies	Hard	(Denmark) Morten Christensen	(United Kingdom) Jeremy Bates (United Kingdom) Nick Fulwood	7–6, 6–3
2.	1988	Crans-Montana, Switzerland	Clay	(Sweden) Peter Svensson	(Sweden) Conny Falk (Sweden) Stefan Svensson	6–4, 6–4
3.	1988	Genova, Italy	Clay	(Sweden) Peter Svensson	(Sweden) Per Henricsson (Sweden) Nicklas Utgren	7–5, 2–6, 6–1
4.	1989	Clermont-Ferrand, France	Clay	(Sweden) Peter Svensson	(Argentina) Marcelo Ingaramo (Argentina) Gustavo Luza	7–5, 6–3
5.	1989	Tampere, Finland	Clay	(Sweden) Peter Svensson	(Sweden) Christer Allgårdh (Sweden) Tobias Svantesson	7–5, 6–7, 6–3
6.	1990	Hanko, Finland	Clay	(Australia) Johan Anderson	(Sweden) Tomas Nydahl (Sweden) Peter Svensson	6–3, 7–6
7.	1992	Oberstaufen, Germany	Clay	(Australia) Johan Anderson	(Belgium) Filip Dewulf (Belgium) Tom Vanhoudt	2–6, 7–6, 6–4
8.	1993	Bruck, Austria	Clay	(Sweden) Nils Holm	(South Africa) Ellis Ferreira (United States) Alexis Hombrecher	0–6, 6–4, 6–4
9.	1993	Fürth, Germany	Clay	(Sweden) Nils Holm	(Latvia) Ģirts Dzelde (Georgia (country)) Vladimir Gabrichidze	W/O
10.	1993	Scheveningen, Netherlands	Clay	(Sweden) Nils Holm	(Netherlands) Jacco Eltingh (Netherlands) Paul Haarhuis	6–1, 6–2
11.	1994	Bronx, United States	Hard	(United Kingdom) Chris Bailey	(China) Pan Bing (China) Xia Jiaping	6–3, 7–5
12.	1995	Lillehammer, Norway	Clay	(Sweden) Thomas Johansson	(Australia) Andrew Ilie (Australia) Todd Larkham	2–6, 6–3, 6–3
