= Lan Bale =

South African tennis player

- Country (sports): South Africa
- Residence: Queenstown, New Zealand
- Born: 7 September 1969 (age 57) Pietermaritzburg, South Africa
- Height: 1.70 m (5 ft 7 in)
- Turned pro: 1991
- Plays: Right-handed
- Prize money: $514,265

Singles
- Career record: 2–3
- Career titles: 0
- Highest ranking: No. 177 (8 November 1993)

Grand Slam singles results
- US Open: 2R (1993)

Doubles
- Career record: 104–111
- Career titles: 4
- Highest ranking: No. 27 (9 May 1995)

Grand Slam doubles results
- Australian Open: 2R (1999, 2000)
- French Open: 3R (1996)
- Wimbledon: QF (1994)
- US Open: 3R (1994, 1998)

Grand Slam mixed doubles results
- Australian Open: 2R (1995)
- French Open: QF (1994)
- Wimbledon: 3R (1994)
- US Open: 1R (1994)

Lan Bale (born 7 September 1969) is a former professional tennis player from South Africa. He enjoyed most of his tennis success while playing doubles. During his career, he won four doubles titles and finished runner-up an additional four times. He achieved a career-high doubles ranking of world No. 27 in 1995.

== ATP career finals ==
=== Doubles: 8 (4–4) ===
Result	W/L	Date	Tournament	Surface	Partner	Opponent	Score
Win	1–0	Apr 1993	Durban, South Africa	Hard	(Zimbabwe) Byron Black	(South Africa) Johan de Beer (South Africa) Marcos Ondruska	7–6, 6–2
Win	2–0	May 1994	Coral Springs, United States	Clay	(New Zealand) Brett Steven	(United States) Ken Flach (France) Stephane Simian	6–3, 7–5
Loss	2–1	Oct 1994	Basel, Switzerland	Hard (i)	(South Africa) John-Laffnie de Jager	(United States) Patrick McEnroe (United States) Jared Palmer	3–6, 6–7
Win	3–1	Oct 1994	Tel Aviv, Israel	Hard	(South Africa) John-Laffnie de Jager	(Sweden) Jan Apell (Sweden) Jonas Björkman	6–7, 6–2, 7–6
Win	4–1	May 1996	Munich, Germany	Clay	(Netherlands) Stephen Noteboom	(France) Olivier Delaître (Italy) Diego Nargiso	4–6, 7–6, 6–4
Loss	4–2	Jul 1998	Båstad, Sweden	Clay	(South Africa) Piet Norval	(Sweden) Magnus Gustafsson (Sweden) Magnus Larsson	4–6, 2–6
Loss	4–3	Oct 1999	Palermo, Italy	Clay	(Spain) Alberto Martín	(Argentina) Mariano Hood (Argentina) Sebastián Prieto	3–6, 1–6
Loss	4–4	Mar 2000	Santiago, Chile	Clay	(South Africa) Piet Norval	(Brazil) Gustavo Kuerten (Brazil) Antonio Prieto	2–6, 4–6
