= 1994 French Open =

- Date: 23 May – 5 June 1994
- Edition: 93
- Category: 64th Grand Slam (ITF)
- Surface: Clay
- Location: Paris (XVI^{e}), France
- Venue: Stade Roland Garros

Champions

Men's singles
- (Spain) Sergi Bruguera

Women's singles
- (Spain) Arantxa Sánchez Vicario

Men's doubles
- (Zimbabwe) Byron Black / (United States) Jonathan Stark

Women's doubles
- (United States) Gigi Fernández / (Belarus) Natalia Zvereva

Mixed doubles
- (Netherlands) Kristie Boogert / (Netherlands) Menno Oosting
← 1993 ·	French Open	· 1995 →

The 1994 French Open was a tennis tournament that took place on the outdoor clay courts at the Stade Roland Garros in Paris, France. The tournament was held from 23 May until 5 June. It was the 93rd staging of the French Open, and the second Grand Slam tennis event of 1994.

== Seniors ==
=== Men's singles ===
(Spain) Sergi Bruguera defeated (Spain) Alberto Berasategui, 6–3, 7–5, 2–6, 6–1 (Note: This was the first ever all-Spanish Men's Singles final.)

- It was Bruguera's 1st title of the year, and his 12th overall. It was his 2nd (and last) career Grand Slam title, and his 2nd French Open title.

=== Women's singles ===
(Spain) Arantxa Sánchez Vicario defeated (France) Mary Pierce, (Note: Pierce was the first Frenchwoman to reach the Women's singles final since Françoise Dürr won the title in 1967.) 6–4, 6–4

- It was Sanchez's 4th title of the year, and her 16th overall. It was her 2nd career Grand Slam title, and her 2nd French Open title.

=== Men's doubles ===
(Zimbabwe) Byron Black / (United States) Jonathan Stark defeated (Sweden) Jan Apell / (Sweden) Jonas Björkman, 6–4, 7–6

=== Women's doubles ===
(United States) Gigi Fernández / (Belarus) Natalia Zvereva defeated (United States) Lindsay Davenport / (United States) Lisa Raymond, 6–2, 6–2

=== Mixed doubles ===
(Netherlands) Kristie Boogert / (Netherlands) Menno Oosting defeated (Latvia) Larisa Savchenko-Neiland / (Russia) Andrei Olhovskiy, 7–5, 3–6, 7–5

- This was Boogert's 1st career Grand Slam title.

== Juniors ==
=== Boys' singles ===
(Spain) Jacobo Díaz defeated (Italy) Giorgio Galimberti, 6–3, 7–6

=== Girls' singles ===
(Switzerland) Martina Hingis (Note: Hingis reached the 1997 and 1999 Women's singles finals, but lost on both occasions.) defeated (Canada) Sonya Jeyaseelan, 6–3, 6–1

=== Boys' doubles ===
(Brazil) Gustavo Kuerten (Note: Kuerten reached the Men's singles finals in 1997, 2000 and 2001, and won on all occasions.) / (Ecuador) Nicolás Lapentti defeated (France) Maxime Boyé / (France) Nicolas Escudé, 6–2, 6–4

=== Girls' doubles ===
(Switzerland) Martina Hingis / (Slovakia) Henrieta Nagyová defeated (Czech Republic) Lenka Cenková / (Czech Republic) Ludmila Richterová, 6–3, 6–2

== Notes ==
Preceded by 1994 Australian Open	Grand Slams	Succeeded by 1994 Wimbledon Championships
