= List of ATP Big Titles doubles champions =

In tennis, the Grand Slam tournaments, the Masters Series tournaments and the Year-end Championship are considered the top-tier events of the men's professional tour annual calendar, in addition to the Olympics. They are collectively known as the 'Big Titles'. The ATP defined the mandatory events (Slams, Masters and YEC) as follows

They are the biggest tournaments in our sport, where participation is mandatory, entry is reserved for the world’s best and success is rewarded with fame and a rich haul of points and prize money.

This article lists the respective doubles champions of those events since the inception of the ATP Tour in 1990.

Note: By setting 1990 as the cut-off point, this list excludes many notable champions in top level tournaments from previous years. The Grand Slam tournaments and the Year-end Championship have been held since 1877 and 1970 respectively. The Olympics was first played in 1896 until 1924. High category tournaments equivalent to the Masters Series like the Grand Prix Super Series existed before the ATP Tour was introduced. There were also the professional Majors, the World Championship Series and the amateur Majors (WHCC, WCCC) before the Open Era.

== Champions list ==
| Year | Grand Slam tournaments | | | | Masters Series (Note: The Masters tournaments are listed in chronological order with two exceptions: 1. Cincinnati was held before Canada in 1996.; 2. Rome was held before Madrid/Hamburg from 2000 to 2010 and after Cincinnati in 2020.) | | | | | | | | | ATP Finals | Olympics |
| Year | Australian Open | French Open | Wimbledon | US Open | Indian Wells | Miami | Monte Carlo | Madrid (Note: The 4th Masters event has been held in: Madrid (2009–present). Hamburg (1990–2008).) | Rome | Canada | Cincinnati | Shanghai (Note: The 8th Masters event has had a very turbulent history. It has been held in: Shanghai (2009–present). Madrid (2002–2008). Stuttgart (1996–2001). Essen (1995). Stockholm (1990–1994).) | Paris | ATP Finals | Olympics |
|---|---|---|---|---|---|---|---|---|---|---|---|---|---|---|---|
| 1990 | (South Africa) Aldrich (1/2) (South Africa) Visser (1/4) | (Spain) Casal (2/4) (Spain) E. Sánchez (2/4) | (United States) Leach (2/9) (United States) Pugh (2/2) | (South Africa) Aldrich (2/2) (South Africa) Visser (2/4) | (West Germany) Becker (1/3) (France) Forget (1/4) | (United States) Leach (1/9) (United States) Pugh (1/2) | (Czechoslovakia) P. Korda (1/4) (Czechoslovakia) Šmíd (1/1) | (Spain) Bruguera (1/1) (United States) Courier (1/3) | (Spain) Casal (1/4) (Spain) E. Sánchez (1/4) | (United States) Annacone (1/1) (United States) Wheaton (1/1) | (Australia) Cahill (1/1) (Australia) M. Kratzmann (1/1) | (France) Forget (2/4) (Switzerland) Hlasek (1/4) | (United States) Davis (1/2) (United States) Pate (1/2) | (France) Forget (3/4) (Switzerland) Hlasek (2/4) | not held |
| 1991 | (United States) Davis (2/2) (United States) Pate (2/2) | (Australia) Fitzgerald (1/6) (Sweden) Järryd (1/6) | (Australia) Fitzgerald (2/6) (Sweden) Järryd (2/6) | (Australia) Fitzgerald (3/6) (Sweden) Järryd (3/6) | (United States) Courier (2/3) (Spain) J. Sánchez (1/2) | (South Africa) W. Ferreira (1/6) (South Africa) Norval (1/3) | (United States) L. Jensen (1/2) (Australia) Warder (1/2) | (Spain) Casal (3/4) (Spain) E. Sánchez (3/4) | (Italy) Camporese (1/1) (Socialist Federal Republic of Yugoslavia) Ivanišević (1/1) | (United States) Galbraith (1/6) (United States) Witsken (1/2) | (United States) Flach (1/3) (United States) Seguso (1/1) | (Australia) Fitzgerald (4/6) (Sweden) Järryd (4/6) | (Australia) Fitzgerald (5/6) (Sweden) Järryd (5/6) | (Australia) Fitzgerald (6/6) (Sweden) Järryd (6/6) | not held |
| 1992 | (Australia) Woodbridge (1/37) (Australia) Woodforde (1/28) | (Switzerland) Hlasek (4/4) (Switzerland) Rosset (2/2) | (United States) J. McEnroe (1/2) (Germany) Stich (2/3) | (United States) Grabb (1/2) (United States) Reneberg (1/2) | (United States) DeVries (1/1) (Australia) Macpherson (1/1) | (United States) Flach (2/3) (United States) Witsken (2/2) | (Germany) Becker (2/3) (Germany) Stich (1/3) | (Spain) Casal (4/4) (Spain) E. Sánchez (4/4) | (Switzerland) Hlasek (3/4) (Switzerland) Rosset (1/2) | (United States) Galbraith (2/6) (South Africa) Visser (3/4) | (Australia) Woodbridge (2/37) (Australia) Woodforde (2/28) | (Australia) Woodbridge (3/37) (Australia) Woodforde (3/28) | (United States) J. McEnroe (2/2) (United States) P. McEnroe (1/1) | (Australia) Woodbridge (4/37) (Australia) Woodforde (4/28) | (Germany) Becker (3/3) (Germany) Stich (3/3) |
| 1993 | (South Africa) Visser (4/4) (Australia) Warder (2/2) | (United States) L. Jensen (2/2) (United States) M. Jensen (1/1) | (Australia) Woodbridge (5/37) (Australia) Woodforde (5/28) | (United States) Flach (3/3) (United States) Leach (3/9) | (France) Forget (4/4) (France) Leconte (1/1) | (Netherlands) R. Krajicek (1/1) (Netherlands) Siemerink (1/2) | (Sweden) Edberg (1/2) (Czech Republic) P. Korda (2/4) | (Netherlands) Haarhuis (1/18) (Netherlands) Koevermans (1/1) | (Netherlands) Eltingh (1/16) (Netherlands) Haarhuis (2/18) | (United States) Courier (3/3) (The Bahamas) Knowles (1/21) | (United States) Agassi (1/1) (Czech Republic) P. Korda (3/4) | (Australia) Woodbridge (6/37) (Australia) Woodforde (6/28) | (Zimbabwe) B. Black (1/6) (United States) Stark (1/4) | (Netherlands) Eltingh (2/16) (Netherlands) Haarhuis (3/18) | not held |
| 1994 | (Netherlands) Eltingh (3/16) (Netherlands) Haarhuis (4/18) | (Zimbabwe) B. Black (2/6) (United States) Stark (2/4) | (Australia) Woodbridge (7/37) (Australia) Woodforde (7/28) | (Netherlands) Eltingh (5/16) (Netherlands) Haarhuis (6/18) | (Canada) Connell (1/4) (United States) Galbraith (3/6) | (Netherlands) Eltingh (4/16) (Netherlands) Haarhuis (5/18) | (Sweden) Kulti (1/2) (Sweden) Larsson (1/1) | (United States) Melville (1/1) (South Africa) Norval (2/3) | (Russia) Kafelnikov (1/11) (Czech Republic) Rikl (1/4) | (Zimbabwe) B. Black (3/6) (United States) Stark (3/4) | (United States) O'Brien (1/7) (Australia) Stolle (1/5) | (Australia) Woodbridge (8/37) (Australia) Woodforde (8/28) | (Netherlands) Eltingh (6/16) (Netherlands) Haarhuis (7/18) | (Sweden) Apell (1/1) (Sweden) Björkman (1/26) | not held |
| 1995 | (United States) Palmer (1/3) (United States) Reneberg (2/2) | (Netherlands) Eltingh (8/16) (Netherlands) Haarhuis (9/18) | (Australia) Woodbridge (10/37) (Australia) Woodforde (10/28) | (Australia) Woodbridge (12/37) (Australia) Woodforde (12/28) | (United States) Ho (1/1) (New Zealand) Steven (1/1) | (Australia) Woodbridge (9/37) (Australia) Woodforde (9/28) | (Netherlands) Eltingh (7/16) (Netherlands) Haarhuis (8/18) | (South Africa) W. Ferreira (2/6) (Russia) Kafelnikov (2/11) | (Czech Republic) Suk (1/3) (Czech Republic) Vacek (1/4) | (Russia) Kafelnikov (3/11) (Russia) Olhovskiy (1/1) | (Australia) Woodbridge (11/37) (Australia) Woodforde (11/28) | (Netherlands) Eltingh (9/16) (Netherlands) Haarhuis (10/18) | (Canada) Connell (2/4) (United States) Galbraith (4/6) | (Canada) Connell (3/4) (United States) Galbraith (5/6) | not held |
| 1996 | (Sweden) Edberg (2/2) (Czech Republic) P. Korda (4/4) | (Russia) Kafelnikov (4/11) (Czech Republic) Vacek (2/4) | (Australia) Woodbridge (15/37) (Australia) Woodforde (15/28) | (Australia) Woodbridge (17/37) (Australia) Woodforde (17/28) | (Australia) Woodbridge (13/37) (Australia) Woodforde (13/28) | (Australia) Woodbridge (14/37) (Australia) Woodforde (14/28) | (South Africa) E. Ferreira (1/6) (Netherlands) Siemerink (2/2) | (The Bahamas) Knowles (2/21) (Canada) Nestor (1/41) | (Zimbabwe) B. Black (4/6) (Canada) Connell (4/4) | (The Bahamas) Knowles (3/21) (Canada) Nestor (2/41) | (United States) Galbraith (6/6) (Netherlands) Haarhuis (11/18) | (Canada) Lareau (1/7) (United States) O'Brien (2/7) | (Netherlands) Eltingh (10/16) (Netherlands) Haarhuis (12/18) | (Australia) Woodbridge (18/37) (Australia) Woodforde (18/28) | (Australia) Woodbridge (16/37) (Australia) Woodforde (16/28) |
| 1997 | (Australia) Woodbridge (19/37) (Australia) Woodforde (19/28) | (Russia) Kafelnikov (5/11) (Czech Republic) Vacek (3/4) | (Australia) Woodbridge (21/37) (Australia) Woodforde (21/28) | (Russia) Kafelnikov (6/11) (Czech Republic) Vacek (4/4) | (The Bahamas) Knowles (4/21) (Canada) Nestor (3/41) | (Australia) Woodbridge (20/37) (Australia) Woodforde (20/28) | (United States) Johnson (1/4) (United States) Montana (1/2) | (Argentina) Lobo (1/1) (Spain) J. Sánchez (2/2) | (The Bahamas) Knowles (5/21) (Canada) Nestor (4/41) | (India) Bhupathi (1/20) (India) Paes (1/21) | (Australia) Woodbridge (22/37) (Australia) Woodforde (22/28) | (Australia) Woodbridge (23/37) (Australia) Woodforde (23/28) | (Netherlands) Eltingh (11/16) (Netherlands) Haarhuis (13/18) | (United States) Leach (4/9) (United States) Stark (4/4) | not held |
| 1998 | (Sweden) Björkman (2/26) (Netherlands) Eltingh (12/16) | (Netherlands) Eltingh (14/16) (Netherlands) Haarhuis (15/18) | (Netherlands) Eltingh (15/16) (Netherlands) Haarhuis (16/18) | (Australia) Stolle (2/5) (Czech Republic) Suk (2/3) | (Sweden) Björkman (3/26) (Australia) Rafter (1/3) | (South Africa) E. Ferreira (2/6) (United States) Leach (5/9) | (Netherlands) Eltingh (13/16) (Netherlands) Haarhuis (14/18) | (United States) Johnson (2/4) (United States) Montana (2/2) | (India) Bhupathi (2/20) (India) Paes (2/21) | (Czech Republic) Damm (1/5) (United States) Grabb (2/2) | (The Bahamas) Knowles (6/21) (Canada) Nestor (5/41) | (Canada) Lareau (2/7) (United States) O'Brien (3/7) | (India) Bhupathi (3/20) (India) Paes (3/21) | (Netherlands) Eltingh (16/16) (Netherlands) Haarhuis (17/18) | not held |
| 1999 | (Sweden) Björkman (4/26) (Australia) Rafter (2/3) | (India) Bhupathi (4/20) (India) Paes (4/21) | (India) Bhupathi (5/20) (India) Paes (5/21) | (Canada) Lareau (3/7) (United States) O'Brien (4/7) | (Zimbabwe) W. Black (1/7) (Australia) Stolle (3/5) | (Zimbabwe) W. Black (2/7) (Australia) Stolle (4/5) | (France) Delaître (1/1) (United Kingdom) Henman (1/2) | (Australia) Arthurs (1/3) (Australia) A. Kratzmann (1/1) | (South Africa) E. Ferreira (3/6) (United States) Leach (6/9) | (Sweden) Björkman (5/26) (Australia) Rafter (3/3) | (Sweden) Björkman (6/26) (Zimbabwe) B. Black (5/6) | (Sweden) Björkman (7/26) (Zimbabwe) B. Black (6/6) | (Canada) Lareau (4/7) (United States) O'Brien (5/7) | (Canada) Lareau (5/7) (United States) O'Brien (6/7) | not held |
| 2000 | (South Africa) E. Ferreira (4/6) (United States) Leach (7/9) | (Australia) Woodbridge (26/37) (Australia) Woodforde (26/28) | (Australia) Woodbridge (27/37) (Australia) Woodforde (27/28) | (Australia) Hewitt (1/1) (Belarus) Mirnyi (1/24) | (United States) O'Brien (7/7) (United States) Palmer (2/3) | (Australia) Woodbridge (24/37) (Australia) Woodforde (24/28) | (South Africa) W. Ferreira (3/6) (Russia) Kafelnikov (7/11) | (Australia) Woodbridge (25/37) (Australia) Woodforde (25/28) | (Czech Republic) Damm (2/5) (Slovakia) Hrbatý (1/1) | (Canada) Lareau (6/7) (Canada) Nestor (6/41) | (Australia) Woodbridge (28/37) (Australia) Woodforde (28/28) | (Czech Republic) Novák (1/3) (Czech Republic) Rikl (2/4) | (Sweden) Kulti (2/2) (Belarus) Mirnyi (2/24) | (United States) Johnson (3/4) (South Africa) Norval (3/3) | (Canada) Lareau (7/7) (Canada) Nestor (7/41) |
| 2001 | (Sweden) Björkman (8/26) (Australia) Woodbridge (29/37) | (India) Bhupathi (6/20) (India) Paes (6/21) | (United States) Johnson (4/4) (United States) Palmer (3/3) | (Zimbabwe) W. Black (3/7) (Zimbabwe) Ullyett (1/7) | (South Africa) W. Ferreira (4/6) (Russia) Kafelnikov (8/11) | (Czech Republic) Novák (2/3) (Czech Republic) Rikl (3/4) | (Sweden) Björkman (9/26) (Australia) Woodbridge (30/37) | (Sweden) Björkman (10/26) (Australia) Woodbridge (31/37) | (South Africa) W. Ferreira (5/6) (Russia) Kafelnikov (9/11) | (Czech Republic) Novák (3/3) (Czech Republic) Rikl (4/4) | (India) Bhupathi (7/20) (India) Paes (7/21) | (Belarus) Mirnyi (3/24) (Australia) Stolle (5/5) | (South Africa) E. Ferreira (5/6) (United States) Leach (8/9) | (South Africa) E. Ferreira (6/6) (United States) Leach (9/9) | not held |
| 2002 | (The Bahamas) Knowles (7/21) (Canada) Nestor (8/41) | (Netherlands) Haarhuis (18/18) (Russia) Kafelnikov (10/11) | (Sweden) Björkman (12/26) (Australia) Woodbridge (33/37) | (India) Bhupathi (9/20) (Belarus) Mirnyi (4/24) | (The Bahamas) Knowles (8/21) (Canada) Nestor (9/41) | (The Bahamas) Knowles (9/21) (Canada) Nestor (10/41) | (Sweden) Björkman (11/26) (Australia) Woodbridge (32/37) | (India) Bhupathi (8/20) (United States) Gambill (1/1) | (Czech Republic) Damm (3/5) (Czech Republic) Suk (3/3) | (United States) B. Bryan (1/60) (United States) M. Bryan (1/63) | (United States) Blake (1/1) (United States) Martin (1/1) | (The Bahamas) Knowles (10/21) (Canada) Nestor (11/41) | (France) Escudé (1/1) (France) Santoro (1/6) | not held | not held |
| 2003 | (France) Llodra (1/7) (France) Santoro (2/6) | (United States) B. Bryan (2/60) (United States) M. Bryan (2/63) | (Sweden) Björkman (13/26) (Australia) Woodbridge (34/37) | (Sweden) Björkman (14/26) (Australia) Woodbridge (35/37) | (South Africa) W. Ferreira (6/6) (Russia) Kafelnikov (11/11) | (Switzerland) Federer (1/2) (Belarus) Mirnyi (5/24) | (India) Bhupathi (10/20) (Belarus) Mirnyi (6/24) | (The Bahamas) Knowles (11/21) (Canada) Nestor (12/41) | (Australia) Arthurs (2/3) (Australia) Hanley (1/3) | (India) Bhupathi (11/20) (Belarus) Mirnyi (7/24) | (United States) B. Bryan (3/60) (United States) M. Bryan (3/63) | (India) Bhupathi (12/20) (Belarus) Mirnyi (8/24) | (Australia) Arthurs (3/3) (Australia) Hanley (2/3) | (United States) B. Bryan (4/60) (United States) M. Bryan (4/63) | not held |
| 2004 | (France) Llodra (2/7) (France) Santoro (3/6) | (Belgium) Malisse (1/2) (Belgium) Rochus (1/1) | (Sweden) Björkman (15/26) (Australia) Woodbridge (36/37) | (The Bahamas) Knowles (13/21) (Canada) Nestor (14/41) | (France) Clément (1/3) (France) Grosjean (1/1) | (Zimbabwe) W. Black (4/7) (Zimbabwe) Ullyett (2/7) | (United Kingdom) Henman (2/2) (Serbia and Montenegro) Zimonjić (1/20) | (Zimbabwe) W. Black (5/7) (Zimbabwe) Ullyett (3/7) | (India) Bhupathi (13/20) (Belarus) Mirnyi (9/24) | (India) Bhupathi (14/20) (India) Paes (8/21) | (The Bahamas) Knowles (12/21) (Canada) Nestor (13/41) | (The Bahamas) Knowles (14/21) (Canada) Nestor (15/41) | (Sweden) Björkman (16/26) (Australia) Woodbridge (37/37) | (United States) B. Bryan (5/60) (United States) M. Bryan (5/63) | (Chile) F. González (1/1) (Chile) Massú (1/1) |
| 2005 | (Zimbabwe) W. Black (6/7) (Zimbabwe) Ullyett (4/7) | (Sweden) Björkman (19/26) (Belarus) Mirnyi (12/24) | (Australia) Huss (1/1) (South Africa) Moodie (1/1) | (United States) B. Bryan (6/60) (United States) M. Bryan (6/63) | (The Bahamas) Knowles (15/21) (Canada) Nestor (16/41) | (Sweden) Björkman (17/26) (Belarus) Mirnyi (10/24) | (India) Paes (9/21) (Serbia and Montenegro) Zimonjić (2/20) | (Sweden) Björkman (18/26) (Belarus) Mirnyi (11/24) | (France) Llodra (3/7) (France) Santoro (4/6) | (Zimbabwe) W. Black (7/7) (Zimbabwe) Ullyett (5/7) | (Sweden) Björkman (20/26) (Belarus) Mirnyi (13/24) | (The Bahamas) Knowles (16/21) (Canada) Nestor (17/41) | (United States) B. Bryan (7/60) (United States) M. Bryan (7/63) | (France) Llodra (4/7) (France) Santoro (5/6) | not held |
| 2006 | (United States) B. Bryan (8/60) (United States) M. Bryan (8/63) | (Sweden) Björkman (23/26) (Belarus) Mirnyi (16/24) | (United States) B. Bryan (9/60) (United States) M. Bryan (9/63) | (Czech Republic) Damm (4/5) (India) Paes (10/21) | (The Bahamas) Knowles (17/21) (Canada) Nestor (18/41) | (Sweden) Björkman (21/26) (Belarus) Mirnyi (14/24) | (Sweden) Björkman (22/26) (Belarus) Mirnyi (15/24) | (Australia) Hanley (3/3) (Zimbabwe) Ullyett (6/7) | (The Bahamas) Knowles (18/21) (Canada) Nestor (19/41) | (United States) B. Bryan (10/60) (United States) M. Bryan (10/63) | (Sweden) Björkman (24/26) (Belarus) Mirnyi (17/24) | (United States) B. Bryan (11/60) (United States) M. Bryan (11/63) | (France) Clément (2/3) (France) Llodra (5/7) | (Sweden) Björkman (25/26) (Belarus) Mirnyi (18/24) | not held |
| 2007 | (United States) B. Bryan (12/60) (United States) M. Bryan (12/63) | (The Bahamas) Knowles (19/21) (Canada) Nestor (20/41) | (France) Clément (3/3) (France) Llodra (6/7) | (Sweden) Aspelin (1/1) (Austria) Knowle (1/1) | (Czech Republic) Damm (5/5) (India) Paes (11/21) | (United States) B. Bryan (13/60) (United States) M. Bryan (13/63) | (United States) B. Bryan (14/60) (United States) M. Bryan (14/63) | (United States) B. Bryan (15/60) (United States) M. Bryan (15/63) | (France) Santoro (6/6) (Serbia) Zimonjić (3/20) | (India) Bhupathi (15/20) (Czech Republic) Vízner (1/1) | (Israel) Erlich (1/3) (Israel) A. Ram (1/4) | (United States) B. Bryan (16/60) (United States) M. Bryan (16/63) | (United States) B. Bryan (17/60) (United States) M. Bryan (17/63) | (The Bahamas) Knowles (20/21) (Canada) Nestor (21/41) | not held |
| 2008 | (Israel) Erlich (2/3) (Israel) A. Ram (2/4) | (Uruguay) Cuevas (1/3) (Peru) Horna (1/1) | (Canada) Nestor (23/41) (Serbia) Zimonjić (5/20) | (United States) B. Bryan (21/60) (United States) M. Bryan (21/63) | (Israel) Erlich (3/3) (Israel) A. Ram (3/4) | (United States) B. Bryan (18/60) (United States) M. Bryan (18/63) | (Spain) Nadal (1/4) (Spain) Robredo (1/1) | (Canada) Nestor (22/41) (Serbia) Zimonjić (4/20) | (United States) B. Bryan (19/60) (United States) M. Bryan (19/63) | (Canada) Nestor (24/41) (Serbia) Zimonjić (6/20) | (United States) B. Bryan (20/60) (United States) M. Bryan (20/63) | (Poland) Fyrstenberg (1/2) (Poland) Matkowski (1/2) | (Sweden) Björkman (26/26) (Zimbabwe) Ullyett (7/7) | (Canada) Nestor (25/41) (Serbia) Zimonjić (7/20) | (Switzerland) Federer (2/2) (Switzerland) Wawrinka (1/1) |
| 2009 | (United States) B. Bryan (22/60) (United States) M. Bryan (22/63) | (Czech Republic) Dlouhý (1/3) (India) Paes (12/21) | (Canada) Nestor (29/41) (Serbia) Zimonjić (11/20) | (Czech Republic) Dlouhý (2/3) (India) Paes (13/21) | (United States) Fish (1/1) (United States) Roddick (1/1) | (Belarus) Mirnyi (19/24) (Israel) A. Ram (4/4) | (Canada) Nestor (26/41) (Serbia) Zimonjić (8/20) | (Canada) Nestor (27/41) (Serbia) Zimonjić (9/20) | (Canada) Nestor (28/41) (Serbia) Zimonjić (10/20) | (India) Bhupathi (16/20) (The Bahamas) Knowles (21/21) | (Canada) Nestor (30/41) (Serbia) Zimonjić (12/20) | (France) Benneteau (1/3) (France) Tsonga (1/1) | (Canada) Nestor (31/41) (Serbia) Zimonjić (13/20) | (United States) B. Bryan (23/60) (United States) M. Bryan (23/63) | not held |
| 2010 | (United States) B. Bryan (24/60) (United States) M. Bryan (24/63) | (Canada) Nestor (33/41) (Serbia) Zimonjić (15/20) | (Austria) Melzer (1/3) (Germany) Petzschner (1/2) | (United States) B. Bryan (29/60) (United States) M. Bryan (29/63) | (Spain) M. López (1/6) (Spain) Nadal (2/4) | (Czech Republic) Dlouhý (3/3) (India) Paes (14/21) | (Canada) Nestor (32/41) (Serbia) Zimonjić (14/20) | (United States) B. Bryan (26/60) (United States) M. Bryan (26/63) | (United States) B. Bryan (25/60) (United States) M. Bryan (25/63) | (United States) B. Bryan (27/60) (United States) M. Bryan (27/63) | (United States) B. Bryan (28/60) (United States) M. Bryan (28/63) | (Austria) Melzer (2/3) (India) Paes (15/21) | (India) Bhupathi (17/20) (Belarus) Mirnyi (20/24) | (Canada) Nestor (34/41) (Serbia) Zimonjić (16/20) | not held |
| 2011 | (United States) B. Bryan (30/60) (United States) M. Bryan (30/63) | (Belarus) Mirnyi (21/24) (Canada) Nestor (35/41) | (United States) B. Bryan (33/60) (United States) M. Bryan (33/63) | (Austria) Melzer (3/3) (Germany) Petzschner (2/2) | (Ukraine) Dolgopolov (1/1) (Belgium) Malisse (2/2) | (India) Bhupathi (18/20) (India) Paes (16/21) | (United States) B. Bryan (31/60) (United States) M. Bryan (31/63) | (United States) B. Bryan (32/60) (United States) M. Bryan (32/63) | (United States) Isner (1/5) (United States) Querrey (1/1) | (France) Llodra (7/7) (Serbia) Zimonjić (17/20) | (India) Bhupathi (19/20) (India) Paes (17/21) | (Belarus) Mirnyi (22/24) (Canada) Nestor (36/41) | (India) Bopanna (1/7) (Pakistan) Qureshi (1/2) | (Belarus) Mirnyi (23/24) (Canada) Nestor (37/41) | not held |
| 2012 | (India) Paes (18/21) (Czech Republic) Štěpánek (1/4) | (Belarus) Mirnyi (24/24) (Canada) Nestor (38/41) | (United Kingdom) Marray (1/1) (Denmark) Nielsen (1/1) | (United States) B. Bryan (37/60) (United States) M. Bryan (37/63) | (Spain) M. López (2/6) (Spain) Nadal (3/4) | (India) Paes (19/21) (Czech Republic) Štěpánek (2/4) | (United States) B. Bryan (34/60) (United States) M. Bryan (34/63) | (Poland) Fyrstenberg (2/2) (Poland) Matkowski (2/2) | (Spain) Granollers (1/14) (Spain) M. López (3/6) | (United States) B. Bryan (36/60) (United States) M. Bryan (36/63) | (Sweden) Lindstedt (1/2) (Romania) Tecău (1/6) | (India) Paes (20/21) (Czech Republic) Štěpánek (3/4) | (India) Bhupathi (20/20) (India) Bopanna (2/7) | (Spain) Granollers (2/14) (Spain) M. López (4/6) | (United States) B. Bryan (35/60) (United States) M. Bryan (35/63) |
| 2013 | (United States) B. Bryan (38/60) (United States) M. Bryan (38/63) | (United States) B. Bryan (42/60) (United States) M. Bryan (42/63) | (United States) B. Bryan (43/60) (United States) M. Bryan (43/63) | (India) Paes (21/21) (Czech Republic) Štěpánek (4/4) | (United States) B. Bryan (39/60) (United States) M. Bryan (39/63) | (Pakistan) Qureshi (2/2) (Netherlands) Rojer (1/8) | (France) Benneteau (2/3) (Serbia) Zimonjić (18/20) | (United States) B. Bryan (40/60) (United States) M. Bryan (40/63) | (United States) B. Bryan (41/60) (United States) M. Bryan (41/60) | (Austria) Peya (1/3) (Brazil) Soares (1/7) | (United States) B. Bryan (44/60) (United States) M. Bryan (44/63) | (Croatia) Dodig (1/9) (Brazil) Melo (1/11) | (United States) B. Bryan (45/60) (United States) M. Bryan (45/63) | (Spain) Marrero (1/2) (Spain) Verdasco (1/1) | not held |
| 2014 | (Poland) Kubot (1/6) (Sweden) Lindstedt (2/2) | (France) Benneteau (3/3) (France) Roger-Vasselin (1/4) | (Canada) Pospisil (1/2) (United States) Sock (1/8) | (United States) B. Bryan (50/60) (United States) M. Bryan (50/63) | (United States) B. Bryan (46/60) (United States) M. Bryan (46/63) | (United States) B. Bryan (47/60) (United States) M. Bryan (47/63) | (United States) B. Bryan (48/60) (United States) M. Bryan (48/63) | (Canada) Nestor (39/41) (Serbia) Zimonjić (19/20) | (Canada) Nestor (40/41) (Serbia) Zimonjić (20/20) | (Austria) Peya (2/3) (Brazil) Soares (2/7) | (United States) B. Bryan (49/60) (United States) M. Bryan (49/63) | (United States) B. Bryan (51/60) (United States) M. Bryan (51/63) | (United States) B. Bryan (52/60) (United States) M. Bryan (52/63) | (United States) B. Bryan (53/60) (United States) M. Bryan (53/63) | not held |
| 2015 | (Italy) Bolelli (1/3) (Italy) Fognini (1/1) | (Croatia) Dodig (2/9) (Brazil) Melo (2/11) | (Netherlands) Rojer (2/8) (Romania) Tecău (2/6) | (France) Herbert (1/15) (France) Mahut (1/14) | (Canada) Pospisil (2/2) (United States) Sock (2/8) | (United States) B. Bryan (54/60) (United States) M. Bryan (54/63) | (United States) B. Bryan (55/60) (United States) M. Bryan (55/63) | (India) Bopanna (3/7) (Romania) Mergea (1/1) | (Uruguay) Cuevas (2/3) (Spain) Marrero (2/2) | (United States) B. Bryan (56/60) (United States) M. Bryan (56/63) | (Canada) Nestor (41/41) (France) Roger-Vasselin (2/4) | (South Africa) Klaasen (1/2) (Brazil) Melo (3/11) | (Croatia) Dodig (3/9) (Brazil) Melo (4/11) | (Netherlands) Rojer (3/8) (Romania) Tecău (3/6) | not held |
| 2016 | (United Kingdom) Murray (1/3) (Brazil) Soares (3/7) | (Spain) F. López (1/1) (Spain) M. López (5/6) | (France) Herbert (5/15) (France) Mahut (5/14) | (United Kingdom) Murray (2/3) (Brazil) Soares (4/7) | (France) Herbert (2/15) (France) Mahut (2/14) | (France) Herbert (3/15) (France) Mahut (3/14) | (France) Herbert (4/15) (France) Mahut (4/14) | (Netherlands) Rojer (4/8) (Romania) Tecău (4/6) | (United States) B. Bryan (57/60) (United States) M. Bryan (57/63) | (Croatia) Dodig (4/9) (Brazil) Melo (5/11) | (Croatia) Dodig (5/9) (Brazil) Melo (6/11) | (United States) Isner (2/5) (United States) Sock (3/8) | (Finland) Kontinen (1/6) (Australia) Peers (1/8) | (Finland) Kontinen (2/6) (Australia) Peers (2/8) | (Spain) M. López (6/6) (Spain) Nadal (4/4) |
| 2017 | (Finland) Kontinen (3/6) (Australia) Peers (3/8) | (United States) R. Harrison (1/1) (New Zealand) Venus (1/2) | (Poland) Kubot (4/6) (Brazil) Melo (9/11) | (Netherlands) Rojer (5/8) (Romania) Tecău (5/6) | (South Africa) Klaasen (2/2) (United States) R. Ram (1/12) | (Poland) Kubot (2/6) (Brazil) Melo (7/11) | (India) Bopanna (4/7) (Uruguay) Cuevas (3/3) | (Poland) Kubot (3/6) (Brazil) Melo (8/11) | (France) Herbert (6/15) (France) Mahut (6/14) | (France) Herbert (7/15) (France) Mahut (7/14) | (France) Herbert (8/15) (France) Mahut (8/14) | (Finland) Kontinen (4/6) (Australia) Peers (4/8) | (Poland) Kubot (5/6) (Brazil) Melo (10/11) | (Finland) Kontinen (5/6) (Australia) Peers (5/8) | not held |
| 2018 | (Austria) Marach (1/1) (Croatia) Pavić (1/14) | (France) Herbert (9/15) (France) Mahut (9/14) | (United States) M. Bryan (60/63) (United States) Sock (5/8) | (United States) M. Bryan (61/63) (United States) Sock (6/8) | (United States) Isner (3/5) (United States) Sock (4/8) | (United States) B. Bryan (58/60) (United States) M. Bryan (58/63) | (United States) B. Bryan (59/60) (United States) M. Bryan (59/63) | (Croatia) Mektić (1/14) (Austria) Peya (3/3) | (Colombia) Cabal (1/4) (Colombia) Farah (1/4) | (Finland) Kontinen (6/6) (Australia) Peers (6/8) | (United Kingdom) Murray (3/3) (Brazil) Soares (5/7) | (Poland) Kubot (6/6) (Brazil) Melo (11/11) | (Spain) Granollers (3/14) (United States) R. Ram (2/12) | (United States) Sock (7/8) (United States) M. Bryan (62/63) | not held |
| 2019 | (France) Herbert (10/15) (France) Mahut (10/14) | (Germany) Krawietz (1/5) (Germany) Mies (1/2) | (Colombia) Cabal (3/4) (Colombia) Farah (3/4) | (Colombia) Cabal (4/4) (Colombia) Farah (4/4) | (Croatia) Mektić (2/14) (Argentina) Zeballos (1/12) | (United States) B. Bryan (60/60) (United States) M. Bryan (63/63) | (Croatia) Mektić (3/14) (Croatia) Škugor (1/1) | (Netherlands) Rojer (6/8) (Romania) Tecău (6/6) | (Colombia) Cabal (2/4) (Colombia) Farah (2/4) | (Spain) Granollers (4/14) (Argentina) Zeballos (2/12) | (Croatia) Dodig (6/9) (Slovakia) Polášek (1/3) | (Croatia) Pavić (2/14) (Brazil) Soares (6/7) | (France) Herbert (11/15) (France) Mahut (11/14) | (France) Herbert (12/15) (France) Mahut (12/14) | not held |
| 2020 | (United States) R. Ram (3/12) (United Kingdom) Salisbury (1/9) | (Germany) Krawietz (2/5) (Germany) Mies (2/2) | not held (Note: not held due to the COVID-19 pandemic.) | (Croatia) Pavić (3/14) (Brazil) Soares (7/7) | not held due to the COVID-19 pandemic | | | | (Spain) Granollers (5/14) (Argentina) Zeballos (3/12) | not held | (Spain) Carreño Busta (1/1) (Australia) de Minaur (1/1) | not held | (Canada) Auger-Aliassime (1/1) (Poland) Hurkacz (1/2) | (Netherlands) Koolhof (1/8) (Croatia) Mektić (4/14) | not held |
| 2021 | (Croatia) Dodig (7/9) (Slovakia) Polášek (2/3) | (France) Herbert (13/15) (France) Mahut (13/14) | (Croatia) Mektić (5/14) (Croatia) Pavić (7/14) | (United States) R. Ram (5/12) (United Kingdom) Salisbury (3/9) | (Australia) Peers (7/8) (Slovakia) Polášek (3/3) | (Croatia) Mektić (6/14) (Croatia) Pavić (4/14) | (Croatia) Mektić (7/14) (Croatia) Pavić (5/14) | (Spain) Granollers (6/14) (Argentina) Zeballos (4/12) | (Croatia) Mektić (8/14) (Croatia) Pavić (6/11) | (United States) R. Ram (4/12) (United Kingdom) Salisbury (2/9) | (Spain) Granollers (7/14) (Argentina) Zeballos (5/12) | not held | (Germany) Pütz (1/4) (New Zealand) Venus (2/2) | (France) Herbert (14/15) (France) Mahut (14/14) | (Croatia) Mektić (9/14) (Croatia) Pavić (8/14) |
| 2022 | (Australia) Kokkinakis (1/1) (Australia) Kyrgios (1/1) | (El Salvador) Arévalo (1/7) (Netherlands) Rojer (7/8) | (Australia) Ebden (1/5) (Australia) Purcell (1/2) | (United States) R. Ram (8/12) (United Kingdom) Salisbury (6/9) | (United States) Isner (4/5) (United States) Sock (8/8) | (Poland) Hurkacz (2/2) (United States) Isner (5/5) | (United States) R. Ram (6/12) (United Kingdom) Salisbury (4/9) | (Netherlands) Koolhof (2/8) (United Kingdom) Skupski (1/6) | (Croatia) Mektić (10/14) (Croatia) Pavić (9/14) | (Netherlands) Koolhof (3/8) (United Kingdom) Skupski (2/6) | (United States) R. Ram (7/12) (United Kingdom) Salisbury (5/9) | not held | (Netherlands) Koolhof (4/8) (United Kingdom) Skupski (3/6) | (United States) R. Ram (9/12) (United Kingdom) Salisbury (7/9) | not held |
| 2023 | (Australia) Hijikata (1/1) (Australia) Kubler (1/1) | (Croatia) Dodig (9/9) (United States) A. Krajicek (2/2) | (Netherlands) Koolhof (5/8) (United Kingdom) Skupski (4/6) | (United States) R. Ram (10/12) (United Kingdom) Salisbury (8/9) | (India) Bopanna (5/7) (Australia) Ebden (2/5) | (Mexico) S. González (1/2) (France) Roger-Vasselin (3/4) | (Croatia) Dodig (8/9) (United States) A. Krajicek (1/2) | (Note: Competed under no nationality due to the Russian invasion of Ukraine.) Khachanov (1/1); Rublev (1/1) | (Monaco) Nys (1/1) (Poland) Zieliński (1/1) | (El Salvador) Arévalo (2/7) (Netherlands) Rojer (8/8) | (Argentina) M. González (1/1) (Argentina) Molteni (1/1) | (Spain) Granollers (8/14) (Argentina) Zeballos (6/12) | (Mexico) S. González (2/2) (France) Roger-Vasselin (4/4) | (United States) R. Ram (11/12) (United Kingdom) Salisbury (9/9) | not held |
| 2024 | (India) Bopanna (6/7) (Australia) Ebden (3/5) | (El Salvador) Arévalo (3/7) (Croatia) Pavić (10/14) | (Finland) Heliövaara (1/6) (United Kingdom) Patten (1/6) | (Australia) Purcell (2/2) (Australia) Thompson (2/2) | (Netherlands) Koolhof (6/8) (Croatia) Mektić (11/14) | (India) Bopanna (7/7) (Australia) Ebden (4/5) | (Belgium) Gillé (1/1) (Belgium) Vliegen (1/1) | (United States) S. Korda (1/1) (Australia) Thompson (1/2) | (Spain) Granollers (9/14) (Argentina) Zeballos (7/12) | (Spain) Granollers (10/14) (Argentina) Zeballos (8/12) | (El Salvador) Arévalo (4/7) (Croatia) Pavić (11/14) | (Netherlands) Koolhof (7/8) (Croatia) Mektić (12/14) | (Netherlands) Koolhof (8/8) (Croatia) Mektić (13/14) | (Germany) Krawietz (3/5) (Germany) Pütz (2/4) | (Australia) Ebden (5/5) (Australia) Peers (8/8) |
| 2025 | (Finland) Heliövaara (2/6) (United Kingdom) Patten (2/6) | (Spain) Granollers (12/14) (Argentina) Zeballos (10/12) | (United Kingdom) Cash (1/2) (United Kingdom) Glasspool (1/2) | (Spain) Granollers (13/14) (Argentina) Zeballos (11/12) | (El Salvador) Arévalo (5/7) (Croatia) Pavić (12/14) | (El Salvador) Arévalo (6/7) (Croatia) Pavić (13/14) | (Monaco) Arneodo (1/1) (France) Guinard (1/2) | (Spain) Granollers (11/14) (Argentina) Zeballos (9/12) | (El Salvador) Arévalo (7/7) (Croatia) Pavić (14/14) | (United Kingdom) Cash (2/2) (United Kingdom) Glasspool (2/2) | (Croatia) Mektić (14/14) (United States) R. Ram (12/12) | (Germany) Krawietz (4/5) (Germany) Pütz (3/4) | (Finland) Heliövaara (3/6) (United Kingdom) Patten (3/6) | (Finland) Heliövaara (4/6) (United Kingdom) Patten (4/6) | not held |
| 2026 | (United States) C. Harrison (1/2) (United Kingdom) Skupski (5/6) | (Spain) Granollers (14/14) (Argentina) Zeballos (12/12) | (Finland) Heliövaara (6/6) (United Kingdom) Patten (6/6) | (United States) C. Harrison (2/2) (United Kingdom) Skupski (6/6) | (Argentina) Andreozzi (1/1) (France) Guinard (2/2) | (Italy) Bolelli (2/3) (Italy) Vavassori (1/2) | (Germany) Krawietz (5/5) (Germany) Pütz (4/4) | (Finland) Heliövaara (5/6) (United Kingdom) Patten (5/6) | (Italy) Bolelli (3/3) (Italy) Vavassori (2/2) | (Brazil) Luz (1/2) (Brazil) Matos (1/2) | (Brazil) Luz (2/2) (Brazil) Matos (2/2) | (Austria) Miedler (1/1) (Austria) Oberleitner (1/1) | (France) Halys (1/1) (France) Herbert (15/15) | | not held |
| Year | Australian Open | French Open | Wimbledon | US Open | Indian Wells | Miami | Monte Carlo | Madrid | Rome | Canada | Cincinnati | Shanghai | Paris | ATP Finals | Olympics |

== Big Titles leaders ==
- Top leaders with 10+ titles (active players and records in bold).

| Titles | Player | Majors | Masters | Year-end | Olympics |
|---|---|---|---|---|---|
| 63 | (United States) Mike Bryan | **18** | **39** | 5 | 1 |
| 60 | (United States) Bob Bryan | 16 | **39** | 4 | 1 |
| 41 | (Canada) Daniel Nestor | 8 | 28 | 4 | 1 |
| 37 | (Australia) Todd Woodbridge | 16 | 18 | 2 | 1 |
| 28 | (Australia) Mark Woodforde | 12 | 14 | 2 | 1 |
| 26 | (Sweden) Jonas Björkman | 9 | 15 | 2 | — |
| 24 | (Belarus) Max Mirnyi | 6 | 16 | 2 | — |
| 21 | (India) Leander Paes | 8 | 13 | — | — |
| 21 | (The Bahamas) Mark Knowles | 3 | 17 | 1 | — |
| 20 | (Serbia) Nenad Zimonjić | 3 | 15 | 2 | — |
| 20 | (India) Mahesh Bhupathi | 4 | 16 | — | — |
| 18 | (Netherlands) Paul Haarhuis | 6 | 10 | 2 | — |
| 16 | (Netherlands) Jacco Eltingh | 6 | 8 | 2 | — |
| 15 | (France) **Pierre-Hugues Herbert** | 5 | 8 | 2 | — |
| 14 | (France) Nicolas Mahut | 5 | 7 | 2 | — |
| 14 | (Croatia) **Mate Pavić** | 4 | 9 | — | 1 |
| 14 | (Croatia) **Nikola Mektić** | 1 | 11 | 1 | 1 |
| 14 | (Spain) **Marcel Granollers** | 3 | 10 | 1 | — |
| 12 | (United States) Rajeev Ram | 4 | 6 | 2 | — |
| 12 | (Argentina) **Horacio Zeballos** | 3 | 9 | — | — |
| 11 | (Russia) Yevgeny Kafelnikov | 4 | 7 | — | — |
| 11 | (Brazil) **Marcelo Melo** | 2 | 9 | — | — |

== Big Titles sweep ==
Winning all of the annual Big Titles (Grand Slams, ATP Masters, and the Year-end Championship), in addition to the Olympics over the course of a player's career. (Note: The Olympics was recognized by ATP as a (non-annual) Big Title in 2020.) The feats of the Career Grand Slam, the Career Golden Slam, the Career Super Slam and the Career Golden Masters are all achieved for the player who has completed the sweep. The feat of completing the Big Titles sweep has been described as completing the game of tennis.

- The event at which the sweep was completed indicated in **bold.**

| Player | AU | FR | WB | US | YEC | OG | IW | MIA | MON | HAM | ROM | CAN | CIN | MAD | PAR |
|---|---|---|---|---|---|---|---|---|---|---|---|---|---|---|---|
| (Canada) Daniel Nestor (Note: They additionally won the Madrid Open on clay and the Shanghai Masters.) | 2002 | 2007 | **2011** | 2004 | 2007 | 2000 | 1997 | 2002 | 2009 | 1996 | 1997 | 2000 | 1996 | 2002 | 2009 |
| (United States) Bob Bryan | 2006 | 2003 | 2006 | 2005 | 2003 | **2012** | 2013 | 2007 | 2007 | 2007 | 2008 | 2002 | 2003 | 2006 | 2005 |
| (United States) Mike Bryan | 2006 | 2003 | 2006 | 2005 | 2003 | **2012** | 2013 | 2007 | 2007 | 2007 | 2008 | 2002 | 2003 | 2006 | 2005 |

=== Calendar sweeps ===
A calendar sweep is defined as the achievement of winning all titles within a specific quarter of a single calendar year.

| Combination | Winner | Year |
|---|---|---|
| Australian Open—Indian Wells—Miami "Sunshine Slam" | (The Bahamas) Mark Knowles (Canada) Daniel Nestor | 2002 |
| Madrid—Rome—French Open "Short Clay Slam" (Note: The complete Clay Slam, that also includes the Monte Carlo title, has never been achieved in doubles.) | (United States) Mike Bryan (United States) Bob Bryan | 2013 |
| Canada—Cincinnati—US Open "Summer Slam" | (United States) Mike Bryan (United States) Bob Bryan | 2010 |
| Shanghai—Paris—Year-end Championship "Autumn Sweep" | (Australia) John Fitzgerald (Sweden) Anders Järryd | 1991 |
| Shanghai—Paris—Year-end Championship "Autumn Sweep" | (United States) Mike Bryan (United States) Bob Bryan | 2014 |

== See also ==
- List of ATP Big Titles singles champions
- List of Grand Slam men's doubles champions
- List of Tennis Masters Series doubles champions
- List of Olympic medalists in tennis
- List of WTA Tour top-level tournament singles champions
- List of WTA Tour top-level tournament doubles champions
