= 1997 in tennis =

This page covers all the important events in the sport of tennis in 1997. Primarily, it provides the results of notable tournaments throughout the year on both the ATP and WTA Tours, the Davis Cup, and the Fed Cup.

== ITF ==
=== Grand Slam events ===
==== Singles ====
	Category	Champions	Finalists	Score in the final
Men	Australian Open	(United States) Pete Sampras	(Spain) Carlos Moyá	6–2, 6–3, 6–3
Men	French Open	(Brazil) Gustavo Kuerten	(Spain) Sergi Bruguera	6–3, 6–4, 6–2
Men	Wimbledon	(United States) Pete Sampras	(France) Cédric Pioline	6–4, 6–2, 6–4
Men	US Open	(Australia) Patrick Rafter	(United Kingdom) Greg Rusedski	6–3, 6–2, 4–6, 7–5
Women	Australian Open	(Switzerland) Martina Hingis	(France) Mary Pierce	6–2, 6–2
Women	French Open	(Croatia) Iva Majoli	(Switzerland) Martina Hingis	6–4, 6–2
Women	Wimbledon	(Switzerland) Martina Hingis	(Czech Republic) Jana Novotná	2–6, 6–3, 6–3
Women	US Open	(Switzerland) Martina Hingis	(United States) Venus Williams	6–0, 6–4

==== Doubles ====
	Category	Men's champions	Finalists	Score in the final
Men	Australian Open	(Australia) Todd Woodbridge (Australia) Mark Woodforde	(Canada) Sébastien Lareau (United States) Alex O'Brien	4–6, 7–5, 7–5, 6–3
Men	French Open	(Russia) Yevgeny Kafelnikov (Czech Republic) Daniel Vacek	(Australia) Todd Woodbridge (Australia) Mark Woodforde	7–6^{(14–12)}, 4–6, 6–3
Men	Wimbledon	(Australia) Todd Woodbridge (Australia) Mark Woodforde	(Netherlands) Jacco Eltingh (Netherlands) Paul Haarhuis	7–6^{(7–4)}, 7–6^{(9–7)}, 5–7, 6–3
Men	US Open	(Russia) Yevgeny Kafelnikov (Czech Republic) Daniel Vacek	(Sweden) Jonas Björkman (Sweden) Nicklas Kulti	7–6^{(10–8)}, 6–3
Women	Australian Open	(Switzerland) Martina Hingis (Belarus) Natasha Zvereva	(United States) Lindsay Davenport (United States) Lisa Raymond	6–2, 6–2
Women	French Open	(United States) Gigi Fernández (Belarus) Natalia Zvereva	(United States) Mary Joe Fernández (United States) Lisa Raymond	6–2, 6–3
Women	Wimbledon	(United States) Gigi Fernández (Belarus) Natasha Zvereva	(United States) Nicole Arendt (Netherlands) Manon Bollegraf	7–6^{(7–4)}, 6–4
Women	US Open	(United States) Lindsay Davenport (Czech Republic) Jana Novotná	(United States) Gigi Fernández (Belarus) Natasha Zvereva	6–3, 6–4
Mixed	Australian Open	(Netherlands) Manon Bollegraf (United States) Rick Leach	(South Africa) John-Laffnie de Jager (Latvia) Larisa Neiland	6–3, 6–7^{(5–7)}, 7–5
Mixed	French Open	(India) Mahesh Bhupathi (Japan) Rika Hiraki	(United States) Patrick Galbraith (United States) Lisa Raymond	6–4, 6–1
Mixed	Wimbledon	(Czech Republic) Cyril Suk (Czech Republic) Helena Suková	(Latvia) Larisa Neiland (Russia) Andrei Olhovskiy	4–6, 6–3, 6–4
Mixed	US Open	(Netherlands) Manon Bollegraf (United States) Rick Leach	(Argentina) Pablo Albano (Argentina) Mercedes Paz	3–6, 7–5, 7–6^{(7–3)}

=== Davis Cup ===
1997 champions
(Sweden)
Sweden
6th title

Sweden
5
Scandinavium, Gothenburg, Sweden
28–30 November
Carpet (indoors)

United States
0

			1	2	3	4	5
1	(Sweden) (United States)	Jonas Björkman; Michael Chang	7; 5	1; 6	6; 3	6; 3
2	(Sweden) (United States)	Magnus Larsson; Pete Sampras	3; 6	7^{7} 6^{1}	2; 1			retired
3	(Sweden) (United States)	Jonas Björkman / Nicklas Kulti; Todd Martin / Jonathan Stark	6; 4	6; 4	6; 4
4	(Sweden) (United States)	Jonas Björkman; Jonathan Stark	6; 1	6; 1
5	(Sweden) (United States)	Magnus Larsson; Michael Chang	7^{7} 6^{4}	6^{6} 7^{8}	6; 4

=== Fed Cup ===
1997 champions
(France)
France
1st title

Netherlands
1
Brabant Hall, 's-Hertogenbosch, Netherlands
4–5 October
Supreme Carpet (indoors)

France
4

			1	2	3
1	(Netherlands) (France)	Brenda Schultz-McCarthy; Sandrine Testud	4; 6	6; 4	3; 6
2	(Netherlands) (France)	Miriam Oremans; Mary Pierce	4; 6	1; 6
3	(Netherlands) (France)	Brenda Schultz-McCarthy; Mary Pierce	4; 6	6; 3	6; 4
4	(Netherlands) (France)	Miriam Oremans; Sandrine Testud	6; 0	3; 6	3; 6
5	(Netherlands) (France)	Manon Bollegraf / Caroline Vis; Alexandra Fusai / Nathalie Tauziat	3; 6	4; 6

=== Hopman Cup ===
1997 champions
(United States)
United States
1st title

United States
2
Burswood Entertainment Complex, Perth, Australia
29 December 1996 – 4 January 1997
Hard (indoors)

South Africa
1

			1	2	3
1	(United States) (South Africa)	Chanda Rubin; Amanda Coetzer	7; 5	6; 2
2	(United States) (South Africa)	Justin Gimelstob; Wayne Ferreira	4; 6	6; 7
3	(United States) (South Africa)	Justin Gimelstob / Chanda Rubin; Wayne Ferreira / Amanda Coetzer	3; 6	6; 2	7; 5

== ATP Tour/WTA Tour ==
=== Year-end Championships ===
==== Singles ====
	Category	Champions	Finalists	Score in the final
Men	Hanover	(United States) Pete Sampras	(Russia) Yevgeny Kafelnikov	6–3, 6–2, 6–2
Women	New York	(Czech Republic) Jana Novotná	(France) Mary Pierce	7–6^{(7–4)}, 6–2, 6–3

==== Doubles ====
	Category	Champions	Finalists	Score in the final
Men	Hartford	(United States) Rick Leach (United States) Jonathan Stark	(India) Mahesh Bhupathi (India) Leander Paes	6–3, 6–4, 7–6^{(7–3)}
Women	New York	(United States) Lindsay Davenport (Czech Republic) Jana Novotná	(France) Alexandra Fusai (France) Nathalie Tauziat	6–7^{(5–7)}, 6–3, 6–2

== Tennis Hall of Fame ==
Class	Inductees	Category
Class of 1997	(United Kingdom) Bunny Austin	Master Player
Class of 1997	(Australia) Lesley Turner Bowrey	Master Player
Class of 1997	(United Kingdom) Walter Clopton Wingfield	Contributor

== Births ==
- 3 February – Paige Mary Hourigan, New Zealand tennis player
- 7 February – Anhelina Kalinina, Ukrainian tennis player
- 10 March – Belinda Bencic, Swiss tennis player
- 20 April – Alexander Zverev, Russian tennis player
- 26 April – Pedro Martínez, Spanish tennis player
- 7 May – Daria Kasatkina, Russian tennis player
- 8 June – Jeļena Ostapenko, Latvian tennis player
- 16 October – Naomi Osaka, Japanese tennis player
- 27 December – Ana Konjuh, Croatian tennis player

== Deaths ==
- 4 February – Jimmy Tattersall, former Wimbledon Boys' Champion, 56
- 8 May – Pat Hughes, UK tennis (doubles) player, 94
- 2 June – Helen Jacobs, multi-Grand Slam-winning US tennis player, 88
- 24 July – Frank Parker, US tennis player, oldest player ever to compete in the US Open men's singles, 81
- 7 October – Felicisimo Ampon, Filipino tennis player, 76
