= 1995 in tennis =

This page covers all the important events in the sport of tennis in 1995. Primarily, it provides the results of notable tournaments throughout the year on both the ATP and WTA Tours, the Davis Cup, and the Fed Cup.

== ITF ==
=== Grand Slam events ===
==== Singles ====
	Championship	Champions	Finalists	Score in the final
Men	Australian Open	(United States) Andre Agassi	(United States) Pete Sampras	4–6, 6–1, 7–6^{(8–6)}, 6–4
Men	French Open	(Austria) Thomas Muster	(United States) Michael Chang	7–5, 6–2, 6–4
Men	Wimbledon	(United States) Pete Sampras	(Germany) Boris Becker	6–7^{(5–7)}, 6–2, 6–4, 6–2
Men	US Open	(United States) Pete Sampras	(United States) Andre Agassi	6–4, 6–3, 4–6, 7–5
Women	Australian Open	(France) Mary Pierce	(Spain) Arantxa Sánchez	6–3, 6–2
Women	French Open	(Germany) Steffi Graf	(Spain) Arantxa Sánchez	7–5, 4–6, 6–0
Women	Wimbledon	(Germany) Steffi Graf	(Spain) Arantxa Sánchez	4–6, 6–1, 7–5
Women	US Open	(Germany) Steffi Graf	(United States) Monica Seles	7–6^{(8–6)}, 0–6, 6–3

==== Doubles ====
	Championship	Champions	Finalists	Score in the final
Men	Australian Open	(United States) Jared Palmer (United States) Richey Reneberg	(The Bahamas) Mark Knowles (Canada) Daniel Nestor	6–3, 3–6, 6–3, 6–2
Men	French Open	(Netherlands) Jacco Eltingh (Netherlands) Paul Haarhuis	(Sweden) Nicklas Kulti (Sweden) Magnus Larsson	6–7^{(3–7)}, 6–4, 6–1
Men	Wimbledon	(Australia) Todd Woodbridge (Australia) Mark Woodforde	(United States) Rick Leach (United States) Scott Melville	7–5, 7-6^{(10–8)}, 7-6^{(7–5)}
Men	US Open	(Australia) Todd Woodbridge (Australia) Mark Woodforde	(United States) Alex O'Brien (Australia) Sandon Stolle	6–3, 6–3
Women	Australian Open	(Czech Republic) Jana Novotná (Spain) Arantxa Sánchez	(United States) Gigi Fernández (Belarus) Natalia Zvereva	6–3, 6-7^{(3–7)}, 6–4
Women	French Open	(United States) Gigi Fernández (Belarus) Natalia Zvereva	(Czech Republic) Jana Novotná (Spain) Arantxa Sánchez	6-7^{(6–8)}, 6–4, 7–5
Women	Wimbledon	(Czech Republic) Jana Novotná (Spain) Arantxa Sánchez	(United States) Gigi Fernández (Belarus) Natalia Zvereva	5–7, 7–5, 6–4
Women	US Open	(United States) Gigi Fernández (Belarus) Natalia Zvereva	(Netherlands) Brenda Schultz-McCarthy (Australia) Rennae Stubbs	7–5, 6–3
Mixed	Australian Open	(United States) Rick Leach (Belarus) Natalia Zvereva	(United States) Gigi Fernández (Czech Republic) Cyril Suk	7-6^{(7–4)}, 6-7^{(3–7)}, 6–4
Mixed	French Open	(Latvia) Larisa Neiland (Australia) Todd Woodbridge	(South Africa) John-Laffnie de Jager (Canada) Jill Hetherington	7-6^{(10–8)}, 7-6^{(7–4)}
Mixed	Wimbledon	(United States) Martina Navratilova (United States) Jonathan Stark	(United States) Gigi Fernández (Czech Republic) Cyril Suk	6–4, 6–4
Mixed	US Open	(United States) Matt Lucena (United States) Meredith McGrath	(United States) Gigi Fernández (Czech Republic) Cyril Suk	6–4, 6–4

=== Davis Cup ===
1995 champions
(United States)
United States
31st title

Russia
2
Olympic Stadium, Moscow, Russia
1–3 December
Clay (indoors)

United States
3

			1	2	3	4	5
1	(Russia) (United States)	Andrei Chesnokov; Pete Sampras	6; 3	4; 6	3; 6	7^{7} 6^{5}	4; 6
2	(Russia) (United States)	Yevgeny Kafelnikov; Jim Courier	7^{7} 6^{1}	7; 5	6; 3
3	(Russia) (United States)	Yevgeny Kafelnikov / Andrei Olhovskiy; Todd Martin / Pete Sampras	5; 7	4; 6	3; 6
4	(Russia) (United States)	Yevgeny Kafelnikov; Pete Sampras	2; 6	4; 6	6^{4} 7^{7}
5	(Russia) (United States)	Andrei Chesnokov; Jim Courier	6^{1} 7^{7}	7; 5	6; 0

=== Fed Cup ===
1995 champions
(Spain)
Spain
4th title

Spain
3
Valencia Tennis Club, Valencia, Spain
25–26 November
Clay (outdoors)

United States
2

			1	2	3
1	(Spain) (United States)	Conchita Martínez; Chanda Rubin	7; 5	7^{7} 6^{3}
2	(Spain) (United States)	Arantxa Sánchez; Mary Joe Fernández	6; 3	6; 2
3	(Spain) (United States)	Conchita Martínez; Mary Joe Fernández	6; 3	6; 4
4	(Spain) (United States)	Arantxa Sánchez; Chanda Rubin	6; 1	4; 6	4; 6
5	(Spain) (United States)	Virginia Ruano / María Sánchez; Lindsay Davenport / Gigi Fernández	3; 6	6^{3} 7^{7}

=== Hopman Cup ===
1995 champions
(Germany)
Germany
2nd title

Ukraine
0
Burswood Entertainment Complex, Perth, Australia
1995
Hard (indoors)

Germany
3

			1	2	3
1	(Ukraine) (Germany)	Natalia Medvedeva; Anke Huber	4; 6	6; 3	4; 6
2	(Ukraine) (Germany)	Andrei Medvedev; Boris Becker	3; 6	7; 6	3; 6
3	(Ukraine) (Germany)	Andrei Medvedev / Natalia Medvedeva; Boris Becker / Anke Huber				w/o

=== ITF Tour ===
- Men's circuit
- Women's circuit

== ATP / WTA ==
=== Year-end Championships ===
==== Singles ====
	Championship	Champions	Finalists	Score in the final
Men	Frankfurt	(Germany) Boris Becker	(United States) Michael Chang	7–6^{(7–3)}, 6–0, 7–6^{(7–5)}
Women	New York	(Germany) Steffi Graf	(Germany) Anke Huber	6–1, 2–6, 6–1, 4–6, 6–3

==== Doubles ====
	Championship	Champions	Finalists	Score in the final
Men	Eindhoven	(Canada) Grant Connell (United States) Patrick Galbraith	(Netherlands) Jacco Eltingh (Netherlands) Paul Haarhuis	7–6^{(8–6)}, 7–6^{(8–6)}, 3–6, 7–6^{(7–2)}
Women	New York	(Czech Republic) Jana Novotná (Spain) Arantxa Sánchez	(United States) Gigi Fernández (Belarus) Natasha Zvereva	6–2, 6–1

=== ATP Super 9 ===
	Championship	Champions	Finalists	Score in the final
Men	Indian Wells	(United States) Pete Sampras	(United States) Andre Agassi	7–5, 6–3, 7–5
Men	Miami	(United States) Andre Agassi	(United States) Pete Sampras	3–6, 6–2, 7–6.
Men	Monte Carlo	(Austria) Thomas Muster	(Germany) Boris Becker	4–6, 5–7, 6–1, 7-6^{(8–6)}, 6–0
Men	Hamburg	(Ukraine) Andrei Medvedev	(Croatia) Goran Ivanišević	6–3, 6–2, 6–1
Men	Rome	(Austria) Thomas Muster	(Spain) Sergi Bruguera	3–6, 7–6^{(7–5)}, 6–2, 6–3
Men	Canada	(United States) Andre Agassi	(United States) Pete Sampras	3–6, 6–2, 6–3
Men	Cincinnati	(United States) Andre Agassi	(United States) Michael Chang	7–5, 6–2
Men	Essen	(Austria) Thomas Muster	(United States) MaliVai Washington	7–6^{(8–6)}, 2–6, 6–3, 6–4
Men	Paris	(United States) Pete Sampras	(Germany) Boris Becker	7–6^{(7–5)}, 6–4, 6–4

== Year-end singles rankings ==
ATP
N°	Player
1	(United States) Pete Sampras
2	(United States) Andre Agassi
3	(Austria) Thomas Muster
4	(Germany) Boris Becker
5	(United States) Michael Chang
6	(Russia) Yevgeny Kafelnikov
7	(Sweden) Thomas Enqvist
8	(United States) Jim Courier
9	(South Africa) Wayne Ferreira
10	(Croatia) Goran Ivanisevic

WTA
N°	Player
1	(Germany) Steffi Graf
1	(United States) Monica Seles
2	(Spain) Conchita Martínez
3	(Spain) Arantxa Sánchez
4	(Japan) Kimiko Date
5	(France) Mary Pierce
6	(Bulgaria) Magdalena Maleeva
7	(Argentina) Gabriela Sabatini
8	(United States) Mary Joe Fernández
9	(Croatia) Iva Majoli
10	(Germany) Anke Huber

== Tennis Hall of Fame ==
Class	Inductees	Category
Class of 1995	(United States) Chris Evert	Player
