= 1997 ATP Tour World Championships =

- Date: 11–16 November (singles); 17–23 November (doubles)
- Edition: 28th (singles) / 24th (doubles)
- Category: Tour Championships
- Prize money: $3,300,000
- Surface: Hard / indoor
- Location: Hanover, Germany (singles); Hartford, US (doubles)
- Venue: EXPO 2000 Tennis Dome (singles); Hartford Civic Center (doubles)

Champions

Singles
- (United States) Pete Sampras

Doubles
- (United States) Rick Leach / (United States) Jonathan Stark
- ATP Finals

The 1997 ATP Tour World Championships (also known for the doubles event as the Phoenix ATP Tour World Doubles Championship for sponsorship reasons) were men's tennis tournaments played on indoor hard courts for the singles event, and indoor carpet courts for the doubles event. It was the 28th edition of the year-end singles championships, the 24th edition of the year-end doubles championships, and both were part of the 1997 ATP Tour. The singles event took place at the EXPO 2000 Tennis Dome in Hanover, Germany, from November 11 through November 16, 1997, and the doubles event at the Hartford Civic Center in Hartford, Connecticut, United States, from November 17 through November 23, 1997. Pete Sampras won the singles title.

== Champions ==
=== Singles ===
(United States) Pete Sampras defeated (Russia) Yevgeny Kafelnikov, 6–3, 6–2, 6–2

- It was Pete Sampras' 8th title of the year, and his 51st overall. It was his 4th year-end championships title, and his 2nd consecutive one.

=== Doubles ===
(United States) Rick Leach / (United States) Jonathan Stark defeated (India) Mahesh Bhupathi / (India) Leander Paes, 6–3, 6–4, 7–6^{(7–3)}
