= 1994 ATP Tour World Championships – Singles =

Singles
- 1994 ATP Tour World Championships

Final
- Champion: (United States) Pete Sampras
- Runner-up: (Germany) Boris Becker
- Score: 4–6, 6–3, 7–5, 6–4

Details
- Draw: 8

Events
Singles	Doubles
← 1993 ·	ATP Finals	· 1995 →

Pete Sampras defeated Boris Becker in the final, 4–6, 6–3, 7–5, 6–4 to win the singles tennis title at the 1994 ATP Tour World Championships. It was his second Tour Finals title.

Michael Stich was the reigning champion, but failed to qualify that year.

== Seeds ==
1. (United States) Pete Sampras (champion)
2. (United States) Andre Agassi (semifinals)
3. (Spain) Sergi Bruguera (semifinals)
4. (Croatia) Goran Ivanišević (round robin)
5. (Germany) Boris Becker (final)
6. (United States) Michael Chang (round robin)
7. (Spain) Alberto Berasategui (round robin)
8. (Sweden) Stefan Edberg (round robin)

== Draw ==
Key

- Q = Qualifier
- WC = Wild card
- LL = Lucky loser
- Alt = Alternate
- ITF = ITF entry
- PR = Protected ranking
- SR = Special ranking
- SE = Special exempt
- JE = Junior exempt
- JR = Junior Accelerator Programme entrant
- CO = College Accelerator Programme entrant
- NG = Next Gen Accelerator Program entrant
- w/o = Walkover
- r = Retired
- d = Defaulted

=== Finals ===
Semifinals
5	(Germany) Boris Becker	6^{5}	6	6
3	(Spain) Sergi Bruguera	7^{7}	4	1
2	(United States) Andre Agassi	6	6^{5}	3
1	(United States) Pete Sampras	4	7^{7}	6

Final
5	(Germany) Boris Becker	6	3	5	4
1	(United States) Pete Sampras	4	6	7	6

=== White group ===
		(United States) Sampras	(Croatia) Ivanišević	(Germany) Becker	(Sweden) Edberg	RR; W–L	Set; W–L	Game; W–L	Standings
1	(United States) Pete Sampras		6–3, 6–4	5–7, 5–7	4–6, 6–3, 7–6^{(7–3)}	2–1	4–3	39–36	2
4	(Croatia) Goran Ivanišević	3–6, 4–6		3–6, 6–3, 6–7^{(5–7)}	3–6, 4–6	0–3	1–6	29–40	4
5	(Germany) Boris Becker	7–5, 7–5	6–3, 3–6, 7–6^{(7–5)}		6–7^{(3–7)}, 6–4, 7–5	3–0	6–2	49–41	1
8	(Sweden) Stefan Edberg	6–4, 3–6, 6–7^{(3–7)}	6–3, 6–4	7–6^{(7–3)}, 4–6, 5–7		1–2	4–4	43–43	3

Standings are determined by: 1. number of wins; 2. number of matches; 3. in two-players-ties, head-to-head records; 4. in three-players-ties, percentage of sets won, or of games won; 5. steering-committee decision.

=== Red group ===
		(United States) Agassi	(Spain) Bruguera	(United States) Chang	(Spain) Berasategui	RR; W–L	Set; W–L	Game; W–L	Standings
2	(United States) Andre Agassi		6–4, 1–6, 6–3	6–4, 6–4	6–2, 6–0	3–0	6–1	37–23	1
3	(Spain) Sergi Bruguera	4–6, 6–1, 3–6		7–6^{(7–1)}, 7–5	6–3, 6–2	2–1	5–2	39–29	2
6	(United States) Michael Chang	4–6, 4–6	6–7^{(1–7)}, 5–7		6–1, 6–0	1–2	2–4	31–27	3
7	(Spain) Alberto Berasategui	2–6, 0–6	3–6, 2–6	1–6, 0–6		0–3	0–6	8–36	4

Standings are determined by: 1. number of wins; 2. number of matches; 3. in two-players-ties, head-to-head records; 4. in three-players-ties, percentage of sets won, or of games won; 5. steering-committee decision.

== See also ==
- ATP World Tour Finals appearances
