= 1996 ATP Tour World Championships – Doubles =

Doubles
- 1996 ATP Tour World Championships

Final
- Champions: (Australia) Todd Woodbridge (Australia) Mark Woodforde
- Runners-up: (Canada) Sébastien Lareau (United States) Alex O'Brien
- Score: 6–4, 5–7, 6–2, 7–6^{(7–3)}

Details
- Draw: 8

Events
Singles	Doubles
← 1995 ·	ATP Tour World Championships	· 1997 →

Todd Woodbridge and Mark Woodforde defeated Sébastien Lareau and Alex O'Brien in the final, 6–4, 5–7, 6–2, 7–6^{(7–3)} to win the doubles tennis title at the 1996 ATP Tour World Championships. It was the Woodies' second Tour Finals title.

Grant Connell and Patrick Galbraith were the reigning champions, but only Connell competed that year partnering Byron Black; they were defeated in the semifinals by Woodbridge and Woodforde.

== Seeds ==
Champion seeds are indicated in bold text while text in italics indicates the round in which those seeds were eliminated.

1. (Australia) **Todd Woodbridge** / (Australia) **Mark Woodforde (champions)**
2. (Zimbabwe) Byron Black / (Canada) Grant Connell (semifinals)
3. (The Bahamas) Mark Knowles / (Canada) Daniel Nestor (round robin)
4. (Netherlands) Jacco Eltingh / (Netherlands) Paul Haarhuis (round robin)
5. (Canada) Sébastien Lareau / (United States) Alex O'Brien (final)
6. (Sweden) Jonas Björkman / (Sweden) Nicklas Kulti (round robin)
7. (Belgium) Libor Pimek / (South Africa) Byron Talbot (round robin)
8. (United States) Trevor Kronemann / (Australia) David Macpherson (semifinals)

== Draw ==
Key

- Q = Qualifier
- WC = Wild card
- LL = Lucky loser
- Alt = Alternate
- ITF = ITF entry
- PR = Protected ranking
- SR = Special ranking
- SE = Special exempt
- JE = Junior exempt
- JR = Junior Accelerator Programme entrant
- CO = College Accelerator Programme entrant
- NG = Next Gen Accelerator Program entrant
- w/o = Walkover
- r = Retired
- d = Defaulted

=== Finals ===
Semifinals
1	(Australia) **Todd Woodbridge** (Australia) **Mark Woodforde**	**6**	**6**
2	(Zimbabwe) Byron Black (Canada) Grant Connell	3	3
5	(Canada) **Sébastien Lareau** (United States) **Alex O'Brien**	**7^{10}**	**7^{7}**
8	(United States) Trevor Kronemann (Australia) David Macpherson	6^{8}	6^{4}

Final
1	(Australia) **Todd Woodbridge** (Australia) **Mark Woodforde**	**6**	5	**6**	**7^{7}**
5	(Canada) Sébastien Lareau (United States) Alex O'Brien	4	**7**	2	6^{3}

=== Green group ===
		(Australia) **Woodbridge** (Australia) **Woodforde**	(Netherlands) Eltingh (Netherlands) Haarhuis	(Canada) **Lareau** (United States) **O'Brien**	(Belgium) Pimek (South Africa) Talbot	RR; W–L	Set; W–L	Game; W–L	Standings
1	(Australia) **Todd Woodbridge** (Australia) **Mark Woodforde**		**4–6, 7–6^{(7–5)}, 7–6^{(7–5)}**	6–4, 3–6, 5–7	**6–2, 6–3**	**2–1**	**5–3**	**44–40**	**2**
4	(Netherlands) Jacco Eltingh (Netherlands) Paul Haarhuis	6–4, 6–7^{(5–7)}, 6–7^{(5–7)}		**7–6^{(7–2)}, 6–4**	7–6^{(7–5)}, 5–7, 4–6	1–2	4–4	47–47	4
5	(Canada) **Sébastien Lareau** (United States) **Alex O'Brien**	**4–6, 6–3, 7–5**	6–7^{(2–7)}, 4–6		**6–1, 6–3**	**2–1**	**4–3**	**39–31**	**1**
7	(Belgium) Libor Pimek (South Africa) Byron Talbot	2–6, 3–6	**6–7^{(5–7)}, 7–5, 6–4**	1–6, 3–6		1–2	2–5	28–40	3

Standings are determined by: 1. number of wins; 2. number of matches; 3. in two-players-ties, head-to-head records; 4. in three-players-ties, percentage of sets won, or of games won; 5. steering-committee decision.

=== Yellow group ===
		(Zimbabwe) **Black** (Canada) **Connell**	(The Bahamas) Knowles (Canada) Nestor (United Kingdom) Broad (South Africa) Norval	(Sweden) Björkman (Sweden) Kulti	(United States) **Kronemann** (Australia) **Macpherson**	RR; W–L	Set; W–L	Game; W–L	Standings
2	(Zimbabwe) **Byron Black** (Canada) **Grant Connell**		**7–5, 3–6, 6–4** (w/ Broad / Norval)	**6–3, 1–6, 6–4**	**3–6, 6–2, 6–3**	**3–0**	**6–3**	**44–39**	**1**
3 9	(The Bahamas) Mark Knowles (Canada) Daniel Nestor (United Kingdom) Neil Broad (South Africa) Piet Norval	5–7, 6–3, 4–6 (w/ Broad / Norval)		6–4, 4–6, 4–6 (w/ Knowles / Nestor)	**6–3, 4–6, 6–3** (w/ Knowles / Nestor)	1–1 0–1	3–3 1–2	30–28 15–16	4 5
6	(Sweden) Jonas Björkman (Sweden) Nicklas Kulti	3–6, 6–1, 4–6	**4–6, 6–4, 6–4** (w/ Knowles / Nestor)		6–4, 5–7, 6–7^{(2–7)}	1–2	4–5	46–45	3
8	(United States) **Trevor Kronemann** (Australia) **David Macpherson**	6–3, 2–6, 3–6	3–6, 6–4, 3–6 (w/ Knowles / Nestor)	**4–6, 7–5, 7–6^{(7–2)}**		**1–2**	**4–5**	**41–48**	**2**

Standings are determined by: 1. number of wins; 2. number of matches; 3. in two-players-ties, head-to-head records; 4. in three-players-ties, percentage of sets won, or of games won; 5. steering-committee decision.
