= The Woodies =

Australian tennis doubles team

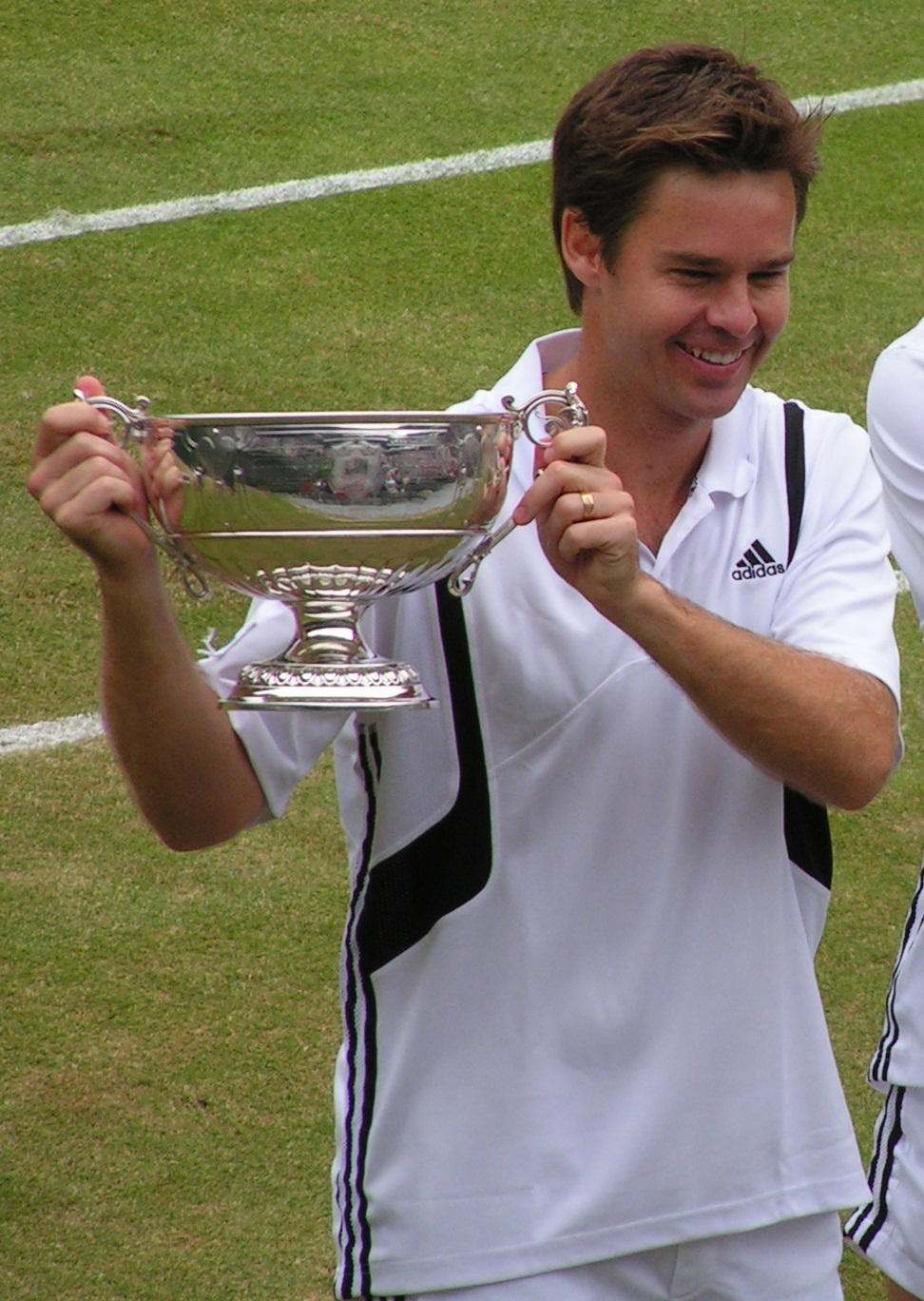
Todd Woodbridge

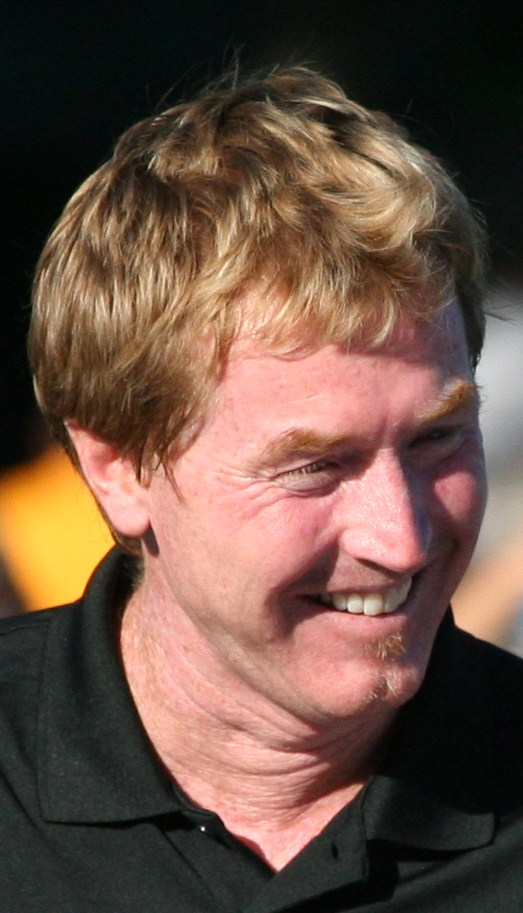
Mark Woodforde

The Woodies was the nickname given to the tennis doubles pairing of Australians Todd Woodbridge and Mark Woodforde, one of the most successful doubles pairings in tennis history.

The Woodies combined Woodforde's left-handed baseline play with Woodbridge's right-handed net skills. They were the ATP Doubles Team of the Year five times, and won 61 ATP doubles titles together. The pair won eleven major titles: one French Open, two Australian Opens, two US Opens, and a record six Wimbledons. They also won two Tour Finals titles in 1992 and 1996.

Representing Australia, the Woodies won an Olympic gold medal for Australia at the 1996 Atlanta Olympics, and a silver medal at the 2000 Sydney Olympics. They often played for Australia in the Davis Cup, including in three finals. In 1999, they helped Australia to its first Davis Cup victory in 13 years.

The pairing ended in 2000, when Woodforde retired from professional tennis. Woodbridge continued his doubles success with Swede Jonas Björkman, until Björkman ended the partnership in 2004; Woodbridge then partnered with Mahesh Bhupathi of India before retiring himself in 2005.

The Woodies were inducted into the Australian Tennis Hall of Fame on Australia Day in January 2010. Their bronzed statues were placed with those of other Australian tennis greats at Melbourne Park, site of the Australian Open. Later that summer, they were honored with induction into the International Tennis Hall of Fame, in Newport, Rhode Island.

== Doubles titles (61) ==
Legend Grand Slam (11) Tennis Masters Cup (2) ATP Masters Series (14) Olympic Gold (1) ATP International Series Gold (11) ATP Tour (22)	Titles by surface Hard (32) Clay (7) Grass (10) Carpet (12)

No.	Date	Tournaments	Surface	Opponents	Score
1.	18 February 1991	Brussels, Belgium	Carpet	(Czech Republic) Libor Pimek (Netherlands) Michiel Schapers	6–3, 6–0
2.	11 March 1991	Copenhagen, Denmark	Carpet	(Iran) Mansour Bahrami (Soviet Union) Andrei Olhovskiy	6–3, 6–1
3.	17 June 1991	London/Queen's Club, England	Grass	(Canada) Grant Connell (Canada) Glenn Michibata	6–4, 7–6
4.	30 September 1991	Brisbane, Australia	Hard	(Australia) John Fitzgerald (Canada) Glenn Michibata	7–6, 6–3
5.	27 January 1992	Australian Open, Melbourne	Hard	(United States) Kelly Jones (United States) Rick Leach	6–4, 6–3, 6–4
6.	17 February 1992	Memphis, US	Hard (i)	(United States) Kevin Curren (South Africa) Gary Muller	7–5, 4–6, 7–6
7.	24 February 1992	Philadelphia, US	Carpet	(United States) Jim Grabb (United States) Richey Reneberg	6–4, 7–6
8.	6 April 1992	Singapore	Hard	(Canada) Grant Connell (Canada) Glenn Michibata	6–7, 6–2, 6–4
9.	17 August 1992	Cincinnati, US	Hard	(United States) Patrick McEnroe (United States) Jonathan Stark	6–3, 1–6, 6–3
10.	19 October 1992	Tokyo Indoor, Japan	Carpet	(United States) Jim Grabb (United States) Richey Reneberg	7–6, 6–4
11.	2 November 1992	Stockholm, Sweden	Carpet	(United States) Steve DeVries (Australia) David Macpherson	6–3, 6–4
12.	29 November 1992	Doubles Championship, Johannesburg	Hard	(Australia) John Fitzgerald (Sweden) Anders Järryd	6–2, 7–6^{(7–4)}, 5–7, 3–6, 6–3
13.	11 January 1993	Adelaide, Australia	Hard	(Australia) John Fitzgerald (Australia) Laurie Warder	6–4, 7–5
14.	15 February 1993	Memphis, US	Hard (i)	(Netherlands) Jacco Eltingh (Netherlands) Paul Haarhuis	7–5, 6–2
15.	14 June 1993	London/Queen's Club, England	Grass	(United Kingdom) Neil Broad (South Africa) Gary Muller	6–7, 6–3, 6–4
16.	5 July 1993	Wimbledon, London	Grass	(Canada) Grant Connell (United States) Patrick Galbraith	7–5, 6–3, 7–6^{(7–4)}
17.	1 November 1993	Stockholm, Sweden	Carpet	(South Africa) Gary Muller (South Africa) Danie Visser	6–1, 3–6, 6–2
18.	7 February 1994	Dubai, UAE	Hard	(Australia) John Fitzgerald (Australia) Darren Cahill	6–7, 6–4, 6–2
19.	9 May 1994	Pinehurst, US	Clay	(United States) Jared Palmer (United States) Richey Reneberg	6–2, 3–6, 6–3
20.	4 July 1994	Wimbledon, London	Grass	(Canada) Grant Connell (United States) Patrick Galbraith	7–6^{(7–3)}, 6–3, 6–1
21.	22 August 1994	Indianapolis, US	Hard	(United States) Jim Grabb (United States) Richey Reneberg	6–3, 6–4
22.	31 October 1994	Stockholm, Sweden	Carpet	(Sweden) Jan Apell (Sweden) Jonas Björkman	6–3, 6–4
23.	16 January 1995	Sydney Outdoor, Australia	Hard	(United States) Trevor Kronemann (Australia) David Macpherson	7–6, 6–4
24.	27 March 1995	Key Biscayne, US	Hard	(United States) Jim Grabb (United States) Patrick McEnroe	6–3, 7–6
25.	15 May 1995	Pinehurst, US	Clay	(United States) Alex O'Brien (Australia) Sandon Stolle	6–2, 6–4
26.	22 May 1995	Coral Springs, US	Clay	(Spain) Sergio Casal (Spain) Emilio Sánchez	6–3, 6–1
27.	10 July 1995	Wimbledon, London	Grass	(United States) Rick Leach (United States) Scott Melville	7–5, 7–6^{(10–8)}, 7–6^{(7–5)}
28.	14 August 1995	Cincinnati, US	Hard	(The Bahamas) Mark Knowles (Canada) Daniel Nestor	6–2, 3–0, ret.
29.	11 September 1995	US Open, US	Hard	(United States) Alex O'Brien (Australia) Sandon Stolle	6–3, 6–3
30.	8 January 1996	Adelaide, Australia	Hard	(Sweden) Jonas Björkman (United States) Tommy Ho	7–5, 7–6
31.	4 March 1996	Philadelphia, US	Carpet	(Zimbabwe) Byron Black (Canada) Grant Connell	7–6, 6–2
32.	18 March 1996	Indian Wells, US	Hard	(United States) Brian MacPhie (Australia) Michael Tebbutt	1–6, 6–2, 6–2
33.	1 April 1996	Key Biscayne, US	Hard	(South Africa) Ellis Ferreira (United States) Patrick Galbraith	6–1, 6–3
34.	22 April 1996	Tokyo, Japan	Hard	(The Bahamas) Mark Knowles (United States) Rick Leach	6–2, 6–3
35.	20 May 1996	Coral Springs, US	Clay	(United States) Ivan Baron (United States) Brett Hansen-Dent	6–3, 6–3
36.	17 June 1996	London/Queen's Club, England	Grass	(Canada) Sébastien Lareau (United States) Alex O'Brien	6–3, 7–6
37.	8 July 1996	Wimbledon, London	Grass	(Zimbabwe) Byron Black (Canada) Grant Connell	4–6, 6–1, 6–3, 6–2
38.	29 July 1996	Atlanta Olympics, US	Hard	(United Kingdom) Neil Broad (United Kingdom) Tim Henman	6–4, 6–4, 6–2
39.	9 September 1996	US Open, New York	Hard	(Netherlands) Jacco Eltingh (Netherlands) Paul Haarhuis	4–6, 7–6, 7–6
40.	7 October 1996	Singapore	Carpet	(Czech Republic) Martin Damm (Russia) Andrei Olhovskiy	7–6, 7–6
41.	17 November 1996	Doubles Championship, Hartford	Carpet	(Canada) Sébastien Lareau (United States) Alex O'Brien	6–4, 5–7, 6–2, 7–6^{(7–3)}
42.	27 January 1997	Australian Open, Melbourne	Hard	(Canada) Sébastien Lareau (United States) Alex O'Brien	4–6, 7–5, 7–5, 6–3
43.	31 March 1997	Key Biscayne, US	Hard	(The Bahamas) Mark Knowles (Canada) Daniel Nestor	7–6, 7–6
44.	7 July 1997	Wimbledon, London	Grass	(Netherlands) Jacco Eltingh (Netherlands) Paul Haarhuis	7–6^{(7–4)}, 7–6^{(9–7)}, 5–7, 6–3
45.	11 August 1997	Cincinnati, US	Hard	(Australia) Mark Philippoussis (Australia) Patrick Rafter	7–6, 4–6, 6–4
46.	27 October 1997	Stuttgart Indoor, Germany	Carpet	(United States) Rick Leach (United States) Jonathan Stark	6–3, 6–3
47.	19 January 1998	Sydney Outdoor, Australia	Hard	(Netherlands) Jacco Eltingh (Canada) Daniel Nestor	6–3, 7–5
48.	16 February 1998	San Jose, US	Hard (i)	(Brazil) Nelson Aerts (Brazil) André Sá	6–1, 7–5
49.	23 February 1998	Memphis, US	Hard (i)	(South Africa) Ellis Ferreira (Mexico) David Roditi	6–3, 6–4
50.	4 May 1998	Munich, Germany	Clay	(Australia) Joshua Eagle (Australia) Andrew Florent	6–0, 6–3
51.	19 October 1998	Singapore	Carpet	(India) Mahesh Bhupathi (India) Leander Paes	6–2, 6–3
52.	15 February 1999	San Jose, US	Hard (i)	(North Macedonia) Aleksandar Kitinov (Federal Republic of Yugoslavia) Nenad Zimonjić	7–5, 6–7^{(3–7)}, 6–4
53.	22 February 1999	Memphis, US	Hard (i)	(Canada) Sébastien Lareau (United States) Alex O'Brien	6–3, 6–4
54.	10 January 2000	Adelaide, Australia	Hard	(Australia) Lleyton Hewitt (Australia) Sandon Stolle	6–4, 6–2
55.	17 January 2000	Sydney, Australia	Hard	(Australia) Lleyton Hewitt (Australia) Sandon Stolle	7–5, 6–4
56.	3 April 2000	Miami, US	Hard	(Czech Republic) Martin Damm (Slovakia) Dominik Hrbatý	6–3, 6–4
57.	22 May 2000	Hamburg, Germany	Clay	(Australia) Wayne Arthurs (Australia) Sandon Stolle	6–7^{(4–7)}, 6–4, 6–3
58.	12 June 2000	French Open, Paris	Clay	(Netherlands) Paul Haarhuis (Australia) Sandon Stolle	7–6^{(9–7)}, 6–4
59.	19 June 2000	London/Queen's Club, England	Grass	(United States) Jonathan Stark (United States) Eric Taino	6–7^{(5–7)}, 6–3, 7–6^{(7–1)}
60.	10 July 2000	Wimbledon, London	Grass	(Netherlands) Paul Haarhuis (Australia) Sandon Stolle	6–3, 6–4, 6–1
61.	14 August 2000	Cincinnati, US	Hard	(South Africa) Ellis Ferreira (United States) Rick Leach	7–6^{(8–6)}, 6–4

=== Runners-up (18) ===
No.	Date	Tournaments	Surface	Opponents	Score
1.	28 November 1993	Doubles Championship, Johannesburg	Hard (i)	(Netherlands) Jacco Eltingh (Netherlands) Paul Haarhuis	6–7^{(4–7)}, 6–7^{(5–7)}, 4–6
2.	13 June 1994	London/Queen's Club, England	Grass	(Sweden) Jan Apell (Sweden) Jonas Björkman	6–3, 6–7, 4–6
3.	12 September 1994	US Open, New York	Hard	(Netherlands) Jacco Eltingh (Netherlands) Paul Haarhuis	3–6, 6–7^{(1–7)}
4.	28 November 1994	Doubles Championship, Jakarta	Hard (i)	(Sweden) Jan Apell (Sweden) Jonas Björkman	4–6, 6–4, 6–4, 6–7^{(5–7)}, 6–7^{(6–8)}
5.	23 October 1995	Vienna, Austria	Carpet	(South Africa) Ellis Ferreira (Netherlands) Jan Siemerink	4–6, 5–7
6.	26 February 1996	Memphis, US	Hard (i)	(The Bahamas) Mark Knowles (Canada) Daniel Nestor	4–6, 5–7
7.	6 January 1997	Adelaide, Australia	Hard	(Australia) Patrick Rafter (United States) Bryan Shelton	4–6, 6–1, 3–6
8.	9 June 1997	French Open, Paris	Clay	(Russia) Yevgeny Kafelnikov (Czech Republic) Daniel Vacek	6–7^{(12–14)}, 6–4, 3–6
9.	2 February 1998	Australian Open, Melbourne	Hard	(Sweden) Jonas Björkman (Netherlands) Jacco Eltingh	2–6, 7–5, 6–2, 4–6, 3–6
10.	27 April 1998	Monte Carlo, Monaco	Clay	(Netherlands) Jacco Eltingh (Netherlands) Paul Haarhuis	4–6, 2–6
11.	6 July 1998	Wimbledon, London	Grass	(Netherlands) Jacco Eltingh (Netherlands) Paul Haarhuis	6–2, 4–6, 6–7^{(3–7)}, 7–5, 8–10
12.	12 October 1998	Shanghai, China	Carpet	(India) Mahesh Bhupathi (India) Leander Paes	4–6, 7–6^{(7–2)}, 6–7^{(4–7)}
13.	3 May 1999	Atlanta, US	Clay	(United States) Patrick Galbraith (United States) Justin Gimelstob	7–5, 6–7, 3–6
14.	14 June 1999	London/Queen's Club, England	Grass	(Canada) Sébastien Lareau (United States) Alex O'Brien	3–6, 6–7^{(3–7)}
15.	16 August 1999	Cincinnati, US	Hard	(Zimbabwe) Byron Black (Sweden) Jonas Björkman	3–6, 6–7^{(6–8)}
16.	11 October 1999	Shanghai, China	Hard	(Canada) Sébastien Lareau (Canada) Daniel Nestor	5–7, 3–6
17.	18 October 1999	Singapore	Hard (i)	(Belarus) Max Mirnyi (United States) Eric Taino	3–6, 4–6
18.	2 October 2000	Sydney Olympics, Australia	Hard	(Canada) Sébastien Lareau (Canada) Daniel Nestor	7–5, 3–6, 4–6, 6–7^{(2–7)}

== Team competition titles (1) ==
No.	Date	Tournament	Surface	Partner	Opponents	Score
1.	3–5 December 1999	Davis Cup, Nice, France	Clay (i)	(Australia) Lleyton Hewitt / (Australia) Mark Philippoussis	(France) Sébastien Grosjean / (France) Fabrice Santoro / (France) Cédric Pioline / (France) Olivier Delaître	3–2

=== Runners-up (1) ===
No.	Date	Tournament	Surface	Partner	Opponents	Score
1.	3–5 December 1993	Davis Cup, Düsseldorf, Germany	Clay (i)	(Australia) Richard Fromberg / (Australia) Jason Stoltenberg	(Germany) Michael Stich / (Germany) Patrik Kühnen / (Germany) Marc-Kevin Goellner / (Germany) Carl-Uwe Steeb	1–4

== Doubles performance timeline ==
Key
W	F	SF	QF	#R	RR	Q#	DNQ	A	NH

(W) winner; (F) finalist; (SF) semifinalist; (QF) quarterfinalist; (#R) rounds 4, 3, 2, 1; (RR) round-robin stage; (Q#) qualification round; (DNQ) did not qualify; (A) absent; (NH) not held; (SR) strike rate (events won / competed); (W–L) win–loss record.

Tournament	1991	1992	1993	1994	1995	1996	1997	1998	1999	2000	Career SR
Grand Slam tournaments
Australian Open	SF	W	1R	QF	3R	1R	W	F	SF	SF	2 / 10
French Open	3R	3R	SF	QF	1R	SF	F	3R	1R	W	1 / 10
Wimbledon	QF	SF	W	W	W	W	W	F	QF	W	6 / 10
US Open	SF	SF	3R	F	W	W	1R	3R	QF	2R	2 / 10
Grand Slam SR	0 / 4	1 / 4	1 / 4	1 / 4	2 / 4	2 / 4	2 / 4	0 / 4	0 / 4	2 / 4	11 / 40
Year-end championship
Tennis Masters Cup	SF	W	F	F	SF	W	RR	RR	SF	-	2 / 9
Olympic Games
Summer Olympic Games	NH	-	Not Held			W	Not Held			F	1 / 2
ATP Masters Series
Indian Wells Masters	-	QF	-	QF	SF	W	SF	1R	2R	QF	1 / 8
Miami Masters	-	-	-	2R	W	W	W	1R	3R	W	4 / 7
Monte-Carlo Masters	-	-	-	-	-	-	-	F	-	-	0 / 1
Rome Masters	1R	1R	-	-	-	-	1R	1R	-	-	0 / 4
Hamburg Masters	-	-	-	-	-	-	-	-	-	W	1 / 1
Canada Masters	-	-	-	-	-	QF	-	-	1R	-	0 / 2
Cincinnati Masters	1R	W	-	SF	W	QF	W	QF	F	W	4 / 9
Stuttgart Masters ²	-	W	W	W	SF	QF	W	QF	SF	1R	4 / 9
Paris Masters	QF	1R	QF	SF	SF	SF	1R	QF	QF	-	0 / 9
Masters Series SR	0 / 3	2 / 5	1 / 2	1 / 5	2 / 5	2 / 6	3 / 6	0 / 7	0 / 6	3 / 5	14 / 50
Doubles team ranking	5	1	3	2	1	1	1	3	3	1	

- ² held in Stockholm 1990–94, Essen in 1995
