= 1996 ATP Tour World Championships – Singles =

Singles
- 1996 ATP Tour World Championships

Final
- Champion: (United States) Pete Sampras
- Runner-up: (Germany) Boris Becker
- Score: 3–6, 7–6^{(7–5)}, 7–6^{(7–4)}, 6–7^{(11–13)}, 6–4

Details
- Draw: 8

Events
Singles	Doubles
← 1995 ·	ATP Finals	· 1997 →

Pete Sampras defeated the defending champion Boris Becker in the final, 3–6, 7–6^{(7–5)}, 7–6^{(7–4)}, 6–7^{(11–13)}, 6–4 to win the singles tennis title at the 1996 ATP Tour World Championships. It was his third Tour Finals title. Andre Agassi withdrew after the first round robin match to be replaced by Thomas Enqvist because of health issues.

== Seeds ==
A champion seed is indicated in bold text while text in italics indicates the round in which that seed was eliminated.

1. (United States) **Pete Sampras (champion)**
2. (United States) Michael Chang (round robin)
3. (Russia) Yevgeny Kafelnikov (round robin)
4. (Croatia) Goran Ivanišević (semifinals)
5. (Austria) Thomas Muster (round robin)
6. (Germany) Boris Becker (final)
7. (United States) Andre Agassi (round robin)
8. (Netherlands) Richard Krajicek (semifinals)
9. (Sweden) Thomas Enqvist (round robin)

== Draw ==
Key

- Q = Qualifier
- WC = Wild card
- LL = Lucky loser
- Alt = Alternate
- ITF = ITF entry
- PR = Protected ranking
- SR = Special ranking
- SE = Special exempt
- JE = Junior exempt
- JR = Junior Accelerator Programme entrant
- CO = College Accelerator Programme entrant
- NG = Next Gen Accelerator Program entrant
- w/o = Walkover
- r = Retired
- d = Defaulted

=== Finals ===
Semifinals
6	(Germany) **Boris Becker**	6^{4}	**7^{7}**	**6**
8	(Netherlands) Richard Krajicek	**7^{7}**	6^{3}	3
4	(Croatia) Goran Ivanišević	**7^{8}**	6^{4}	5
1	(United States) **Pete Sampras**	6^{6}	**7^{7}**	**7**

Final
6	(Germany) Boris Becker	**6**	6^{5}	6^{4}	**7^{13}**	4
1	(United States) **Pete Sampras**	3	**7^{7}**	**7^{7}**	6^{11}	**6**

=== Red group ===
		(United States) **Sampras**	(Russia) Kafelnikov	(Germany) **Becker**	(United States) Agassi (Sweden) Enqvist	RR; W–L	Set; W–L	Game; W–L	Standings
1	(United States) **Pete Sampras**		**6–4, 6–4**	6–7^{(10–12)}, 6–7^{(4–7)}	**6–2, 6–1** (w/ Agassi)	**2–1**	**4–2**	**36–25**	**2**
3	(Russia) Yevgeny Kafelnikov	4–6, 4–6		4–6, 5–7	**6–3, 7–6^{(7–5)}** (w/ Enqvist)	1–2	2–4	30–34	3
6	(Germany) **Boris Becker**	**7–6^{(12–10)}, 7–6^{(7–4)}**	**6–4, 7–5**		3–6, 6–7^{(1–7)} (w/ Enqvist)	**2–1**	**4–2**	**36–34**	**1**
7; 9	(United States) Andre Agassi (Sweden) Thomas Enqvist	2–6, 1–6 (w/ Agassi)	3–6, 6–7^{(5–7)} (w/ Enqvist)	**6–3, 7–6^{(7–1)}** (w/ Enqvist)		0–1; 1–1	0–2; 2–2	3–12; 22–22	5; 4

Standings are determined by: 1. number of wins; 2. number of matches; 3. in two-players-ties, head-to-head records; 4. in three-players-ties, percentage of sets won, or of games won; 5. steering-committee decision.

=== White group ===
		(United States) Chang	(Croatia) **Ivanišević**	(Austria) Muster	(Netherlands) **Krajicek**	RR; W–L	Set; W–L	Game; W–L	Standings
2	(United States) Michael Chang		**6–7^{(8–10)}, 7–6^{(7–5)}, 6–1**	4–6, 3–6	4–6, 4–6	1–2	2–5	34–38	4
4	(Croatia) **Goran Ivanišević**	7–6^{(10–8)}, 6–7^{(5–7)}, 1–6		**6–4, 6–4**	**6–4, 6–7^{(4–7)}, 7–6^{(7–1)}**	**2–1**	**5–3**	**45–44**	**1**
5	(Austria) Thomas Muster	**6–4, 6–3**	4–6, 4–6		6–7^{(4–7)}, 7–6^{(7–5)}, 3–6	1–2	3–4	36–38	3
8	(Netherlands) **Richard Krajicek**	**6–4, 6–4**	4–6, 7–6^{(7–4)}, 6–7^{(1–7)}	**7–6^{(7–4)}, 6–7^{(5–7)}, 6–3**		**2–1**	**5–3**	**48–43**	**2**

Standings are determined by: 1. number of wins; 2. number of matches; 3. in two-players-ties, head-to-head records; 4. in three-players-ties, percentage of sets won, or of games won; 5. steering-committee decision.

== See also ==
- ATP World Tour Finals appearances
