= 1997 ATP Tour World Championships – Singles =

Singles
- 1997 ATP Tour World Championships

Final
- Champion: (United States) Pete Sampras
- Runner-up: (Russia) Yevgeny Kafelnikov
- Score: 6–3, 6–2, 6–2

Details
- Draw: 8

Events
Singles	Doubles
← 1996 ·	ATP Finals	· 1998 →

Defending champion Pete Sampras defeated Yevgeny Kafelnikov in the final, 6–3, 6–2, 6–2 to win the singles tennis title at the 1997 ATP Tour World Championships. It was his fourth Tour Finals title.

== Seeds ==
1. (United States) Pete Sampras (champion)
2. (United States) Michael Chang (round robin)
3. (Australia) Patrick Rafter (round robin)
4. (Sweden) Jonas Björkman (semifinals)
5. (United Kingdom) Greg Rusedski (round robin, withdrew due to a right hamstring injury)
6. (Spain) Carlos Moyá (semifinals)
7. (Russia) Yevgeny Kafelnikov (final)
8. (Spain) Sergi Bruguera (round robin, withdrew due to a lower back injury)
9. (Austria) Thomas Muster (round robin)
10. (United Kingdom) Tim Henman (round robin)

== Draw ==
Key

- Q = Qualifier
- WC = Wild card
- LL = Lucky loser
- Alt = Alternate
- ITF = ITF entry
- PR = Protected ranking
- SR = Special ranking
- SE = Special exempt
- JE = Junior exempt
- JR = Junior Accelerator Programme entrant
- CO = College Accelerator Programme entrant
- NG = Next Gen Accelerator Program entrant
- w/o = Walkover
- r = Retired
- d = Defaulted

=== Finals ===
Semifinals
1	(United States) Pete Sampras	6	6
4	(Sweden) Jonas Björkman	3	4
6	(Russia) Yevgeny Kafelnikov	7^{7}	7^{7}
7	(Spain) Carlos Moyá	6^{2}	6^{3}

Final
1	(United States) Pete Sampras	6	6	6
6	(Russia) Yevgeny Kafelnikov	3	2	2

=== Red group ===
		(United States) Sampras	(Australia) Rafter	(United Kingdom) Rusedski (Austria) Muster	(Spain) Moyá	RR; W–L	Set; W–L	Game; W–L	Standings
1	(United States) Pete Sampras		6–4, 6–1	6–4, 7–5 (w/ Rusedski)	3–6, 7–6^{(7–4)}, 2–6	2–1	5–2	37–32	1
3	(Australia) Patrick Rafter	4–6, 1–6		4–6, 6–3, 6–4 (w/ Rusedski)	6–4, 6–2	2–1	4–3	33–31	3
5; 9	(United Kingdom) Greg Rusedski (Austria) Thomas Muster	4–6, 5–7 (w/ Rusedski)	6–4, 3–6, 4–6 (w/ Rusedski)		2–6, 3–6 (w/ Muster)	0–2; 0–1	1–4; 0–2	22–29; 5–12	4; 5
7	(Spain) Carlos Moyá	6–3, 6–7^{(4–7)}, 6–2	4–6, 2–6	6–2, 6–3 (w/ Muster)		2–1	4–3	36–29	2

Standings are determined by: 1. number of wins; 2. number of matches; 3. in two-players-ties, head-to-head records; 4. in three-players-ties, percentage of sets won, or of games won; 5. steering-committee decision.

=== White group ===
		(United States) Chang	(Sweden) Björkman	(Russia) Kafelnikov	(Spain) Bruguera (United Kingdom) Henman	RR; W–L	Set; W–L	Game; W–L	Standings
2	(United States) Michael Chang		4–6, 5–7	3–6, 0–6	7–6^{(10–8)}, 6–2 (w/ Bruguera)	1–2	2–4	25–33	3
4	(Sweden) Jonas Björkman	6–4, 7–5		3–6, 6–7^{(6–8)}	6–3, 6–1 (w/ Bruguera)	2–1	4–2	34–26	2
6	(Russia) Yevgeny Kafelnikov	6–3, 6–0	6–3, 7–6^{(8–6)}		4–6, 4–6 (w/ Henman)	2–1	4–2	33–24	1
8; 10	(Spain) Sergi Bruguera (United Kingdom) Tim Henman	6–7^{(8–10)}, 2–6 (w/ Bruguera)	3–6, 1–6 (w/ Bruguera)	6–4, 6–4 (w/ Henman)		0–2; 1–0	0–4; 2–0	12–25; 12–8	5; 4

Standings are determined by: 1. number of wins; 2. number of matches; 3. in two-players-ties, head-to-head records; 4. in three-players-ties, percentage of sets won, or of games won; 5. steering-committee decision.

== See also ==
- ATP World Tour Finals appearances
