= 1995 ATP Tour World Championships – Singles =

Singles
- 1995 ATP Tour World Championships

Final
- Champion: (Germany) Boris Becker
- Runner-up: (United States) Michael Chang
- Score: 7–6^{(7–3)}, 6–0, 7–6^{(7–5)}

Details
- Draw: 8

Events
Singles	Doubles
← 1994 ·	ATP Finals	· 1996 →

Boris Becker defeated Michael Chang in the final, 7–6^{(7–3)}, 6–0, 7–6^{(7–5)} to win the singles tennis title at the 1995 ATP Tour World Championships.

Pete Sampras was the defending champion, but was defeated in the semifinals by Chang.

== Seeds ==
1. (United States) Pete Sampras (semifinals)
2. (Austria) Thomas Muster (round robin)
3. (United States) Michael Chang (final)
4. (Germany) Boris Becker (champion)
5. (Russia) Yevgeny Kafelnikov (round robin)
6. (United States) Jim Courier (round robin)
7. (Sweden) Thomas Enqvist (semifinals)
8. (South Africa) Wayne Ferreira (round robin)

== Draw ==
Key

- Q = Qualifier
- WC = Wild card
- LL = Lucky loser
- Alt = Alternate
- ITF = ITF entry
- PR = Protected ranking
- SR = Special ranking
- SE = Special exempt
- JE = Junior exempt
- JR = Junior Accelerator Programme entrant
- CO = College Accelerator Programme entrant
- NG = Next Gen Accelerator Program entrant
- w/o = Walkover
- r = Retired
- d = Defaulted

=== Finals ===
Semifinals
1	(United States) Pete Sampras	4	4
3	(United States) Michael Chang	6	6
7	(Sweden) Thomas Enqvist	4	7^{7}	5
4	(Germany) Boris Becker	6	6^{5}	7

Final
3	(United States) Michael Chang	6^{3}	0	6^{5}
4	(Germany) Boris Becker	7^{7}	6	7^{7}

=== White group ===
		(United States) Sampras	(Germany) Becker	(Russia) Kafelnikov	(South Africa) Ferreira	RR; W–L	Set; W–L	Game; W–L	Standings
1	(United States) Pete Sampras		6–2, 7–6^{(7–3)}	6–3, 6–3	6–7^{(1–7)}, 6–4, 3–6	2–1	5–2	40–31	1
4	(Germany) Boris Becker	2–6, 6–7^{(3–7)}		6–4, 7–5	4–6, 6–2, 7–6^{(7–5)}	2–1	4–3	38–36	2
5	(Russia) Yevgeny Kafelnikov	3–6, 3–6	4–6, 5–7		6–3, 6–7^{(5–7)}, 1–6	0–3	1–6	28–41	4
8	(South Africa) Wayne Ferreira	7–6^{(7–1)}, 4–6, 6–3	6–4, 2–6, 6–7^{(5–7)}	3–6, 7–6^{(7–5)}, 6–1		2–1	5–4	47–45	3

Standings are determined by: 1. number of wins; 2. number of matches; 3. in two-players-ties, head-to-head records; 4. in three-players-ties, percentage of sets won, or of games won; 5. steering-committee decision.

=== Red group ===
		(Austria) Muster	(United States) Chang	(United States) Courier	(Sweden) Enqvist	RR; W–L	Set; W–L	Game; W–L	Standings
2	(Austria) Thomas Muster		6–4, 2–6, 3–6	4–6, 6–4, 4–6	4–6, 7–6^{(7–3)}, 4–6	0–3	3–6	40–50	4
3	(United States) Michael Chang	4–6, 6–2, 6–3		6–2, 7–5	1–6, 4–6	2–1	4–3	34–30	2
6	(United States) Jim Courier	6–4, 4–6, 6–4	2–6, 5–7		3–6, 2–6	1–2	2–5	28–39	3
7	(Sweden) Thomas Enqvist	6–4, 6–7^{(3–7)}, 6–4	6–1, 6–4	6–3, 6–2		3–0	6–1	42–25	1

Standings are determined by: 1. number of wins; 2. number of matches; 3. in two-players-ties, head-to-head records; 4. in three-players-ties, percentage of sets won, or of games won; 5. steering-committee decision.

== See also ==
- ATP World Tour Finals appearances
