= 1992 ATP Tour World Championships – Doubles =

Doubles
- 1992 ATP Tour World Championships

Final
- Champion: (Australia) Todd Woodbridge (Australia) Mark Woodforde
- Runner-up: (Australia) John Fitzgerald (Sweden) Anders Järryd
- Score: 6–2, 7–6^{(7–4)}, 5–7, 3–6, 6–3

Details
- Draw: 8

Events
| Singles | Doubles |
- ATP Tour World Championships

Todd Woodbridge and Mark Woodforde defeated the defending champions John Fitzgerald and Anders Järryd in the final, 6–2, 7–6^{(7–4)}, 5–7, 3–6, 6–3 to win the doubles tennis title at the 1992 ATP Tour World Championships. It was the Woodies' first Tour Finals title.

== Draw ==
Key

- Q = Qualifier
- WC = Wild card
- LL = Lucky loser
- Alt = Alternate
- ITF = ITF entry
- PR = Protected ranking
- SR = Special ranking
- SE = Special exempt
- JE = Junior exempt
- JR = Junior Accelerator Programme entrant
- CO = College Accelerator Programme entrant
- NG = Next Gen Accelerator Program entrant
- w/o = Walkover
- r = Retired
- d = Defaulted

=== Finals ===
Semifinals
(Australia) John Fitzgerald (Sweden) Anders Järryd | 7 | 6
(Australia) Mark Kratzmann (Australia) Wally Masur | 6 | 3
(Spain) Sergio Casal (Spain) Emilio Sánchez | 6 | 1 | 4
(Australia) Todd Woodbridge (Australia) Mark Woodforde | 4 | 6 | 6

Final
(Australia) John Fitzgerald (Sweden) Anders Järryd | 2 | 6^{4} | 7 | 6 | 3
(Australia) Todd Woodbridge (Australia) Mark Woodforde | 6 | 7 | 5 | 3 | 6

=== Group A ===
| | (Australia) Woodbridge (Australia) Woodforde | (United States) DeVries (Australia) Macpherson | (Australia) Fitzgerald (Sweden) Järryd | (Netherlands) Nijssen (Czechoslovakia) Suk | RR; W?L | Set; W?L | Game; W?L | Standings |
| (Australia) Todd Woodbridge (Australia) Mark Woodforde | | 6–3, 6–3 | 5–7, 6–7 | 6–4, 3–6, 6–1 | 2–1 | 4–3 | 38–31 | 2 |
| (United States) Steve DeVries (Australia) David Macpherson | 3–6, 3–6 | | 2–6, 3–6 | 7–6, 3–6, 7–6 | 1–2 | 2–5 | 28–42 | 3 |
| (Australia) John Fitzgerald (Sweden) Anders Järryd | 7–5, 7–6 | 6–2, 6–3 | | 7–6, 6–4 | 3–0 | 6–0 | 39–26 | 1 |
| (Netherlands) Tom Nijssen (Czechoslovakia) Cyril Suk | 4–6, 6–3, 1–6 | 6–7, 6–3, 6–7 | 6–7, 4–6 | | 0–3 | 2–6 | 39–45 | 4 |

Standings are determined by: 1. number of wins; 2. number of matches; 3. in two-players-ties, head-to-head records; 4. in three-players-ties, percentage of sets won, or of games won; 5. steering-committee decision.

=== Group B ===
| | (Spain) Casal (Spain) Sánchez | (United States) Grabb (United States) Reneberg | (Australia) Kratzmann (Australia) Masur | (United States) Jones (United States) Leach | RR; W?L | Set; W?L | Game; W?L | Standings |
| (Spain) Sergio Casal (Spain) Emilio Sánchez | | 6–4, 3–6, 7–6 | 6–4, 7–6 | 3–6, 6–7 | 2–1 | 4–3 | 38–39 | 1 |
| (United States) Jim Grabb (United States) Richey Reneberg | 4–6, 6–3, 6–7 | | 6–4, 6–7, 4–6 | 7–6, 7–6 | 1–2 | 4–4 | 46–45 | 3 |
| (Australia) Mark Kratzmann (Australia) Wally Masur | 4–6, 6–7 | 4–6, 7–6, 6–4 | | 7–5, 4–6, 6–1 | 2–1 | 4–4 | 44–41 | 2 |
| (United States) Kelly Jones (United States) Rick Leach | 6–3, 7–6 | 6–7, 6–7 | 5–7, 6–4, 1–6 | | 1–2 | 3–4 | 37–40 | 4 |

Standings are determined by: 1. number of wins; 2. number of matches; 3. in two-players-ties, head-to-head records; 4. in three-players-ties, percentage of sets won, or of games won; 5. steering-committee decision.
