= 1997 French Open – Men's doubles =

Men's doubles
- 1997 French Open

Final
- Champion: (Russia) Yevgeny Kafelnikov (Czech Republic) Daniel Vacek
- Runner-up: (Australia) Todd Woodbridge (Australia) Mark Woodforde
- Score: 7–6^{(14–12)}, 4–6, 6–3

Details
- Draw: 64
- Seeds: 16

Events
Singles	men	women		boys	girls
Doubles	men	women	mixed	boys	girls
WC Singles	men	women	quad
WC Doubles	men	women	quad
Legends	−45	45+	women
← 1996 ·	French Open	· 1998 →

Yevgeny Kafelnikov and Daniel Vacek successfully defended their title defeated Todd Woodbridge and Mark Woodforde in the final, 7–6^{(14–12)}, 4–6, 6–3 to win the men's doubles title at the French Open.

Woobridge and Woodforde (collectively known as The Woodies) attempted their chance to make history to complete all four Grand Slams at once, having won the previous year's Wimbledon, US Open and Australian Open earlier that year. But they lost to Kafelnikov and Vacek, ending their 23-winning match streak. This feat would later achieve by Bob and Mike Bryan in the 2013 Wimbledon Championships.

== Seeds ==
Champion seeds are indicated in bold text while text in italics indicates the round in which those seeds were eliminated.

1. (Australia) Todd Woodbridge / (Australia) Mark Woodforde (final)
2. (Netherlands) Jacco Eltingh / (Netherlands) Paul Haarhuis (semifinals)
3. (The Bahamas) Mark Knowles / (Canada) Daniel Nestor (second round)
4. (Russia) Yevgeny Kafelnikov / (Czech Republic) Daniel Vacek (champions)
5. (Canada) Sébastien Lareau / (United States) Alex O'Brien (second round)
6. (South Africa) Ellis Ferreira / (United States) Patrick Galbraith (second round)
7. (United States) Rick Leach / (United States) Jonathan Stark (quarterfinals)
8. (Argentina) Luis Lobo / (Spain) Javier Sánchez (second round)

9. (Sweden) Jonas Björkman / (Sweden) Nicklas Kulti (second round)
10. (Australia) Mark Philippoussis / (Australia) Patrick Rafter (third round)
11. (Czech Republic) Martin Damm / (Russia) Andrei Olhovskiy (second round)
12. (Australia) Sandon Stolle / (Czech Republic) Cyril Suk (first round)
13. (United Kingdom) Neil Broad / (South Africa) Piet Norval (second round)
14. (United States) Donald Johnson / (United States) Francisco Montana (first round)
15. (Belgium) Libor Pimek / (South Africa) Byron Talbot (first round)
16. (United States) Trevor Kronemann / (Australia) David Macpherson (second round)

Click on the seed number of a player to go to their draw section.

== Draw ==
=== Key ===
- Q = Qualifier
- WC = Wild card
- LL = Lucky loser
- Alt = Alternate
- ITF = ITF entry
- PR = Protected ranking
- SR = Special ranking
- SE = Special exempt
- JE = Junior exempt
- JR = Junior Accelerator Programme entrant
- CO = College Accelerator Programme entrant
- NG = Next Gen Accelerator Program entrant
- w/o = Walkover
- r = Retired
- d = Defaulted

=== Finals ===
Quarterfinals
1	(Australia) Todd Woodbridge (Australia) Mark Woodforde	6	7^{7}
7	(United States) Rick Leach (United States) Jonathan Stark	2	6^{5}
(Spain) Tomás Carbonell (Spain) Francisco Roig	6	4	4
(Argentina) Lucas Arnold Ker (Argentina) Daniel Orsanic	4	6	6
(Germany) Karsten Braasch (Germany) Jens Knippschild	6	6^{2}	3
4	(Russia) Yevgeny Kafelnikov (Czech Republic) Daniel Vacek	4	7^{7}	6
(Australia) Joshua Eagle (Australia) Andrew Florent	7^{8}	4	2
2	(Netherlands) Jacco Eltingh (Netherlands) Paul Haarhuis	6^{6}	6	6

Semifinals
1	(Australia) Todd Woodbridge (Australia) Mark Woodforde	4	6	6
(Argentina) Lucas Arnold Ker (Argentina) Daniel Orsanic	6	4	3
4	(Russia) Yevgeny Kafelnikov (Czech Republic) Daniel Vacek	7^{7}	7^{7}
2	(Netherlands) Jacco Eltingh (Netherlands) Paul Haarhuis	6^{4}	6^{3}

Final
1	(Australia) Todd Woodbridge (Australia) Mark Woodforde	6^{12}	6	3
4	(Russia) Yevgeny Kafelnikov (Czech Republic) Daniel Vacek	7^{14}	4	6

=== Top half ===
==== Section 1 ====
First round
1	(Australia) T Woodbridge (Australia) M Woodforde	6	6
WC	(France) J-F Bachelot (France) J-B Perlant	2	1
(Australia) W Arthurs (Australia) A Kratzmann	6	7^{7}
(Belarus) M Mirnyi (Zimbabwe) K Ullyett	3	6^{0}
(South Africa) B Haygarth (United States) TJ Middleton	1	6^{5}
(United States) S Davis (South Africa) C van Rensburg	6	7^{7}
(Czech Republic) P Korda (United States) J Salzenstein	7	6
15	(Belgium) L Pimek (South Africa) B Talbot	5	0
9	(Sweden) J Björkman (Sweden) N Kulti	6	6
WC	(France) S Grosjean (France) O Mutis	1	4
(Portugal) N Marques (Belgium) T Vanhoudt	4	2
(Netherlands) T Kempers (Netherlands) M Oosting	6	6
(Brazil) G Kuerten (Brazil) F Meligeni	6	4	8
(Venezuela) N Pereira (United States) J Tarango	1	6	6
WC	(France) G Marx (France) O Morel	5	3
7	(United States) R Leach (United States) J Stark	7	6

Second round
1	(Australia) T Woodbridge (Australia) M Woodforde	7^{7}	6
(Australia) W Arthurs (Australia) A Kratzmann	6^{4}	3
(United States) S Davis (South Africa) C van Rensburg	4	6^{2}
(Czech Republic) P Korda (United States) J Salzenstein	6	7^{7}
9	(Sweden) J Björkman (Sweden) N Kulti	3	6	3
(Netherlands) T Kempers (Netherlands) M Oosting	6	1	6
(Brazil) G Kuerten (Brazil) F Meligeni	3	3
7	(United States) R Leach (United States) J Stark	6	6

Third round
1	(Australia) T Woodbridge (Australia) M Woodforde	2	6	9
(Czech Republic) P Korda (United States) J Salzenstein	6	3	7
(Netherlands) T Kempers (Netherlands) M Oosting	3	7^{7}	2
7	(United States) R Leach (United States) J Stark	6	6^{5}	6

Quarterfinals
1	(Australia) T Woodbridge (Australia) M Woodforde	6	7^{7}
7	(United States) R Leach (United States) J Stark	2	6^{5}

==== Section 2 ====
First round
3	(The Bahamas) M Knowles (Canada) D Nestor	6	7^{8}
(South Africa) M Barnard (South Africa) J-L de Jager	3	6^{6}
(Spain) T Carbonell (Spain) F Roig	6	6
(Spain) E Sánchez (Netherlands) F Wibier	3	4
(India) M Bhupathi (India) L Paes	6	6
(United States) D Randall (United States) J Waite	2	2
(Netherlands) S Groen (Netherlands) J Siemerink	2	7^{8}	6
14	(United States) D Johnson (United States) F Montana	6	6^{6}	4
11	(Czech Republic) M Damm (Russia) A Olhovskiy	6	4	6
(Croatia) S Hiršzon (Croatia) G Ivanišević	4	6	1
(France) O Delaître (France) F Santoro	3	7^{7}	6
(Argentina) P Albano (Sweden) P Nyborg	6	6^{4}	4
(Argentina) L Arnold Ker (Argentina) D Orsanic	6	6
(Serbia and Montenegro) N Djordjevic (United States) D Flach	2	1
(United Kingdom) M Petchey (Czech Republic) D Rikl	4	6^{11}
5	(Canada) S Lareau (United States) A O'Brien	6	7^{13}

Second round
3	(The Bahamas) M Knowles (Canada) D Nestor	6^{9}	1
(Spain) T Carbonell (Spain) F Roig	7^{11}	6
(India) M Bhupathi (India) L Paes	7^{7}	6^{5}	3
(Netherlands) S Groen (Netherlands) J Siemerink	6^{5}	7^{7}	6
11	(Czech Republic) M Damm (Russia) A Olhovskiy	1	6	3
(France) O Delaître (France) F Santoro	6	3	6
(Argentina) L Arnold Ker (Argentina) D Orsanic	7^{8}	4	6
5	(Canada) S Lareau (United States) A O'Brien	6^{6}	6	1

Third round
(Spain) T Carbonell (Spain) F Roig	3	6	6
(Netherlands) S Groen (Netherlands) J Siemerink	6	3	2
(France) O Delaître (France) F Santoro	6^{1}	1
(Argentina) L Arnold Ker (Argentina) D Orsanic	7^{7}	6

Quarterfinals
(Spain) T Carbonell (Spain) F Roig	6	4	4
(Argentina) L Arnold Ker (Argentina) D Orsanic	4	6	6

=== Bottom half ===
==== Section 3 ====
First round
6	(South Africa) E Ferreira (United States) P Galbraith	6	6
(North Macedonia) A Kitinov (United States) G Van Emburgh	3	2
(Germany) K Braasch (Germany) J Knippschild	5	6	9
(Netherlands) HJ Davids (Netherlands) S Schalken	7	4	7
(United States) L Jensen (United States) M Jensen	6	6
(United States) M Keil (United States) C Woodruff	3	4
(Portugal) E Couto (Portugal) B Mota	6	6^{10}	6
12	(Australia) S Stolle (Czech Republic) C Suk	2	7^{12}	2
13	(United Kingdom) N Broad (South Africa) P Norval	6	6
(Zimbabwe) B Black (United States) J Gimelstob	3	2
(Zimbabwe) W Black (United States) J Grabb	6	7^{7}
(United States) K Kinnear (Czech Republic) P Vízner	3	6^{3}
(Netherlands) T Nijssen (Netherlands) S Noteboom	6	6
WC	(France) A Boetsch (Switzerland) M Rosset	4	2
(Sweden) R Bergh (Sweden) D Ekerot	1	7	3
4	(Russia) Y Kafelnikov (Czech Republic) D Vacek	6	5	6

Second round
6	(South Africa) E Ferreira (United States) P Galbraith	4	6	8
6	(Germany) K Braasch (Germany) J Knippschild	6	3	10
(United States) L Jensen (United States) M Jensen	4	6	11
(Portugal) E Couto (Portugal) B Mota	6	4	9
13	(United Kingdom) N Broad (South Africa) P Norval	6^{5}	6	8
(Zimbabwe) W Black (United States) J Grabb	7^{7}	2	10
(Netherlands) T Nijssen (Netherlands) S Noteboom	1	4
4	(Russia) Y Kafelnikov (Czech Republic) D Vacek	6	6

Third round
(Germany) K Braasch (Germany) J Knippschild	6	7^{7}
(United States) L Jensen (United States) M Jensen	4	6^{2}
(Zimbabwe) W Black (United States) J Grabb	4	6^{4}
4	(Russia) Y Kafelnikov (Czech Republic) D Vacek	6	7^{7}

Quarterfinals
(Germany) K Braasch (Germany) J Knippschild	6	6^{2}	3
4	(Russia) Y Kafelnikov (Czech Republic) D Vacek	4	7^{7}	6

==== Section 4 ====
First round
8	(Argentina) L Lobo (Spain) J Sánchez	6	4	6
(South Africa) M Ondruska (South Africa) G Stafford	3	6	3
WC	(France) A Clément (France) N Escudé	6	4	2
(Australia) J Eagle (Australia) A Florent	4	6	6
WC	(France) J-P Fleurian (France) S Simian	5	6	6
WC	(France) R Gilbert (France) G Raoux	7	4	1
(United States) B MacPhie (South Africa) G Muller	7^{7}	6^{6}	6
10	(Australia) M Philippoussis (Australia) P Rafter	6^{5}	7^{8}	8
16	(United States) T Kronemann (Australia) D Macpherson	4	7^{14}	6
(Argentina) J Frana (Ecuador) N Lapentti	6	6^{12}	3
(Italy) C Brandi (Italy) F Messori	6	7
(United States) K Jones (United States) S Melville	4	5
(Australia) P Cash (United States) R Reneberg	5	7	6
(Australia) P Kilderry (Australia) M Tebbutt	7	5	3
(South Africa) D Adams (South Africa) W Ferreira	4	6	1
2	(Netherlands) J Eltingh (Netherlands) P Haarhuis	6	4	6

Second round
8	(Argentina) L Lobo (Spain) J Sánchez	2	6^{1}
(Australia) J Eagle (Australia) A Florent	6	7^{7}
WC	(France) J-P Fleurian (France) S Simian	7	3	4
10	(Australia) M Philippoussis (Australia) P Rafter	5	6	6
16	(United States) T Kronemann (Australia) D Macpherson	5	4
(Italy) C Brandi (Italy) F Messori	7	6
(Australia) P Cash (United States) R Reneberg	6	1	4
2	(Netherlands) J Eltingh (Netherlands) P Haarhuis	3	6	6

Third round
(Australia) J Eagle (Australia) A Florent	6	6^{8}	6
10	(Australia) M Philippoussis (Australia) P Rafter	2	7^{10}	3
(Italy) C Brandi (Italy) F Messori	3	3
2	(Netherlands) J Eltingh (Netherlands) P Haarhuis	6	6

Quarterfinals
(Australia) J Eagle (Australia) A Florent	7^{8}	4	2
2	(Netherlands) J Eltingh (Netherlands) P Haarhuis	6^{6}	6	6
