= 1997 ATP Tour World Championships – Doubles =

Doubles
- 1997 ATP Tour World Championships

Final
- Champions: (United States) Rick Leach (United States) Jonathan Stark
- Runners-up: (India) Mahesh Bhupathi (India) Leander Paes
- Score: 6–3, 6–4, 7–6^{(7–3)}

Details
- Draw: 8

Events
Singles	Doubles
← 1996 ·	ATP Tour World Championships	· 1998 →

Rick Leach and Jonathan Stark defeated Mahesh Bhupathi and Leander Paes in the final, 6–3, 6–4, 7–6^{(7–3)} to win the doubles tennis title at the 1997 ATP Tour World Championships.

Mark Woodforde and Todd Woodbridge were the defending champions, but were eliminated in the round-robin stage.

== Seeds ==
1. (Australia) Todd Woodbridge / (Australia) Mark Woodforde (round robin)
2. (Netherlands) Jacco Eltingh / (Netherlands) Paul Haarhuis (semifinals)
3. (South Africa) Ellis Ferreira / (United States) Patrick Galbraith (round robin)
4. (United States) Rick Leach / (United States) Jonathan Stark (champions)
5. (India) Mahesh Bhupathi / (India) Leander Paes (final)
6. (Canada) Sébastien Lareau / (United States) Alex O'Brien (semifinals)
7. (The Bahamas) Mark Knowles / (Canada) Daniel Nestor (round robin, withdrew due to a rib injury of Knowles)
8. (United States) Donald Johnson / (United States) Francisco Montana (round robin)
9. (United States) Trevor Kronemann / (Australia) David Macpherson (round robin)

== Draw ==
Key

- Q = Qualifier
- WC = Wild card
- LL = Lucky loser
- Alt = Alternate
- ITF = ITF entry
- PR = Protected ranking
- SR = Special ranking
- SE = Special exempt
- JE = Junior exempt
- JR = Junior Accelerator Programme entrant
- CO = College Accelerator Programme entrant
- NG = Next Gen Accelerator Program entrant
- w/o = Walkover
- r = Retired
- d = Defaulted

=== Finals ===
Semifinals
5	(India) Mahesh Bhupathi (India) Leander Paes	6	6
6	(Canada) Sébastien Lareau (United States) Alex O'Brien	4	4
4	(United States) Rick Leach (United States) Jonathan Stark	6	6
2	(Netherlands) Jacco Eltingh (Netherlands) Paul Haarhuis	3	4

Final
5	(India) Mahesh Bhupathi (India) Leander Paes	3	4	6^{3}
4	(United States) Rick Leach (United States) Jonathan Stark	6	6	7^{7}

=== Green group ===
		(Australia) Woodbridge (Australia) Woodforde	(United States) Leach (United States) Stark	(Canada) Lareau (United States) O'Brien	(United States) Johnson (United States) Montana	RR; W–L	Set; W–L	Game; W–L	Standings
1	(Australia) Todd Woodbridge (Australia) Mark Woodforde		6–3, 6–7^{(4–7)}, 7–6^{(7–5)}	6–7^{(4–7)}, 5–7	6–4, 6–1	2–1	4–3	42–35	3
4	(United States) Rick Leach (United States) Jonathan Stark	3–6, 7–6^{(7–4)}, 6–7^{(5–7)}		6–4, 3–6, 6–3	6–3, 6–4	2–1	5–3	43–39	1
6	(Canada) Sébastien Lareau (United States) Alex O'Brien	7–6^{(7–4)}, 7–5	4–6, 6–3, 3–6		6–3, 3–6, 6–3	2–1	5–3	42–38	2
8	(United States) Donald Johnson (United States) Francisco Montana	4–6, 1–6	3–6, 4–6	3–6, 6–3, 3–6		0–3	1–6	24–39	4

Standings are determined by: 1. number of wins; 2. number of matches; 3. in two-players-ties, head-to-head records; 4. in three-players-ties, percentage of sets won, or of games won; 5. steering-committee decision.

=== Yellow group ===
		(Netherlands) Eltingh (Netherlands) Haarhuis	(South Africa) Ferreira (United States) Galbraith	(India) Bhupathi (India) Paes	(The Bahamas) Knowles (Canada) Nestor (United States) Kronemann (Australia) Macpherson	RR; W–L	Set; W–L	Game; W–L	Standings
2	(Netherlands) Jacco Eltingh (Netherlands) Paul Haarhuis		7–6^{(7–1)}, 6–7^{(5–7)}, 6–2	6–3, 6–2	6–4, 7–6^{(7–4)} (w/ Knowles / Nestor)	3–0	6–1	44–30	1
3	(South Africa) Ellis Ferreira (United States) Patrick Galbraith	6–7^{(1–7)}, 7–6^{(7–5)}, 2–6		5–7, 4–6	6–2, 6–7^{(6–8)}, 7–5 (w/ Knowles / Nestor)	1–2	3–5	43–46	3
5	(India) Mahesh Bhupathi (India) Leander Paes	3–6, 2–6	7–5, 6–4		6–4, 7–6^{(7–5)} (w/ Kronemann / Macpherson)	2–1	4–2	31–31	2
7 9	(The Bahamas) Mark Knowles (Canada) Daniel Nestor (United States) Trevor Kronemann (Australia) David Macpherson	4–6, 6–7^{(4–7)} (w/ Knowles / Nestor)	2–6, 7–6^{(8–6)}, 5–7 (w/ Knowles / Nestor)	4–6, 6–7^{(5–7)} (w/ Kronemann / Macpherson)		0–2 0–1	1–4 0–2	24–32 10–13	4 5

Standings are determined by: 1. number of wins; 2. number of matches; 3. in two-players-ties, head-to-head records; 4. in three-players-ties, percentage of sets won, or of games won; 5. steering-committee decision.
