= 1995 ATP Tour World Championships – Doubles =

Doubles
- 1995 ATP Tour World Championships

Final
- Champions: (Canada) Grant Connell (United States) Patrick Galbraith
- Runners-up: (Netherlands) Jacco Eltingh (Netherlands) Paul Haarhuis
- Score: 7–6^{(8–6)}, 7–6^{(8–6)}, 3–6, 7–6^{(7–2)}

Details
- Draw: 8
- Seeds: 8

Events
Singles	Doubles
- ATP Tour World Championships

Grant Connell and Patrick Galbraith defeated Jacco Eltingh and Paul Haarhuis in the final, 7–6^{(8–6)}, 7–6^{(8–6)}, 3–6, 7–6^{(7–2)} to win the doubles tennis title at the 1995 ATP Tour World Championships.

Jan Apell and Jonas Björkman were the reigning champions, but failed to qualify that year.

== Seeds ==
1. (Australia) Todd Woodbridge / (Australia) Mark Woodforde (semifinals)
2. (Netherlands) Jacco Eltingh / (Netherlands) Paul Haarhuis (final)
3. (Canada) Grant Connell / (United States) Patrick Galbraith (champions)
4. (Czech Republic) Cyril Suk / (Czech Republic) Daniel Vacek (semifinals)
5. (The Bahamas) Mark Knowles / (Canada) Daniel Nestor (round robin)
6. (United States) Rick Leach / (United States) Scott Melville (round robin)
7. (United States) Tommy Ho / (New Zealand) Brett Steven (round robin)
8. (Argentina) Luis Lobo / (Spain) Javier Sánchez (round robin)

== Draw ==
Key

- Q = Qualifier
- WC = Wild card
- LL = Lucky loser
- Alt = Alternate
- ITF = ITF entry
- PR = Protected ranking
- SR = Special ranking
- SE = Special exempt
- JE = Junior exempt
- JR = Junior Accelerator Programme entrant
- CO = College Accelerator Programme entrant
- NG = Next Gen Accelerator Program entrant
- w/o = Walkover
- r = Retired
- d = Defaulted

=== Finals ===
Semifinals
3	(Canada) Grant Connell (United States) Patrick Galbraith	7	6
1	(Australia) Todd Woodbridge (Australia) Mark Woodforde	6	3
2	(Netherlands) Jacco Eltingh (Netherlands) Paul Haarhuis	6	6
4	(Czech Republic) Cyril Suk (Czech Republic) Daniel Vacek	3	2

Final
3	(Canada) Grant Connell (United States) Patrick Galbraith	7^{8}	7^{8}	3	7^{7}
2	(Netherlands) Jacco Eltingh (Netherlands) Paul Haarhuis	6^{6}	6^{6}	6	6^{2}

=== Group A ===
		(Australia) Woodbridge (Australia) Woodforge	(Czech Republic) Suk (Czech Republic) Vacek	(The Bahamas) Knowles (Canada) Nestor	(United States) Ho (New Zealand) Steven	RR; W–L	Set; W–L	Game; W–L	Standings
1	(Australia) Todd Woodbridge (Australia) Mark Woodforde		7–6, 2–6, 6–4	6–7, 6–4, 7–6	6–7, 6–3, 6–2	3–0	6–3	52–45	1
4	(Czech Republic) Cyril Suk (Czech Republic) Daniel Vacek	6–7, 6–2, 4–6		6–3, 7–5	6–3, 7–6	2–1	5–2	42–32	2
5	(The Bahamas) Mark Knowles (Canada) Daniel Nestor	7–6, 4–6, 6–7	3–6, 5–7		4–6, 4–6	0–3	1–6	33–44	4
7	(United States) Tommy Ho (New Zealand) Brett Steven	7–6, 3–6, 2–6	3–6, 6–7	6–4, 6–4		1–2	3–4	33–39	3

Standings are determined by: 1. number of wins; 2. number of matches; 3. in two-players-ties, head-to-head records; 4. in three-players-ties, percentage of sets won, or of games won; 5. steering-committee decision.

=== Group B ===
		(Netherlands) Eltingh (Netherlands) Haarhuis	(Canada) Connell (United States) Galbraith	(United States) Leach (United States) Melville	(Argentina) Lobo (Spain) Sánchez	RR; W–L	Set; W–L	Game; W–L	Standings
2	(Netherlands) Jacco Eltingh (Netherlands) Paul Haarhuis		7–6, 6–2	7–5, 6–3	7–5, 6–1	3–0	6–0	39–22	1
3	(Canada) Grant Connell (United States) Patrick Galbraith	6–7, 2–6		6–3, 6–2	7–5, 6–7, 3–6	1–2	3–4	36–36	2
6	(United States) Rick Leach (United States) Scott Melville	5–7, 3–6	3–6, 2–6		7–5, 6–2	1–2	2–4	26–32	4
8	(Argentina) Luis Lobo (Spain) Javier Sánchez	5–7, 1–6	5–7, 7–6, 6–3	5–7, 2–6		1–2	2–5	31–42	3

Standings are determined by: 1. number of wins; 2. number of matches; 3. in two-players-ties, head-to-head records; 4. in three-players-ties, percentage of sets won, or of games won; 5. steering-committee decision.
