= ATP Masters 1000 tournaments =

Tennis tournaments

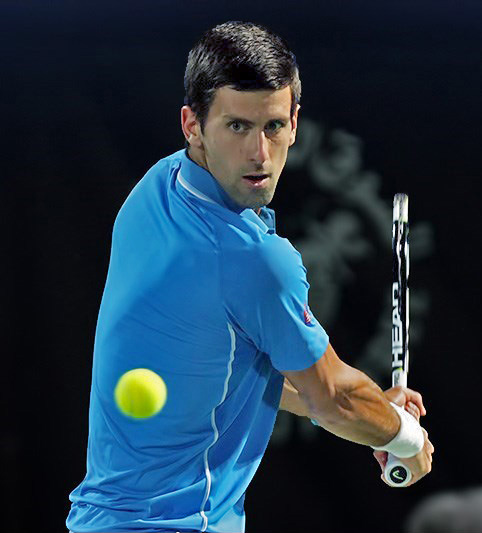
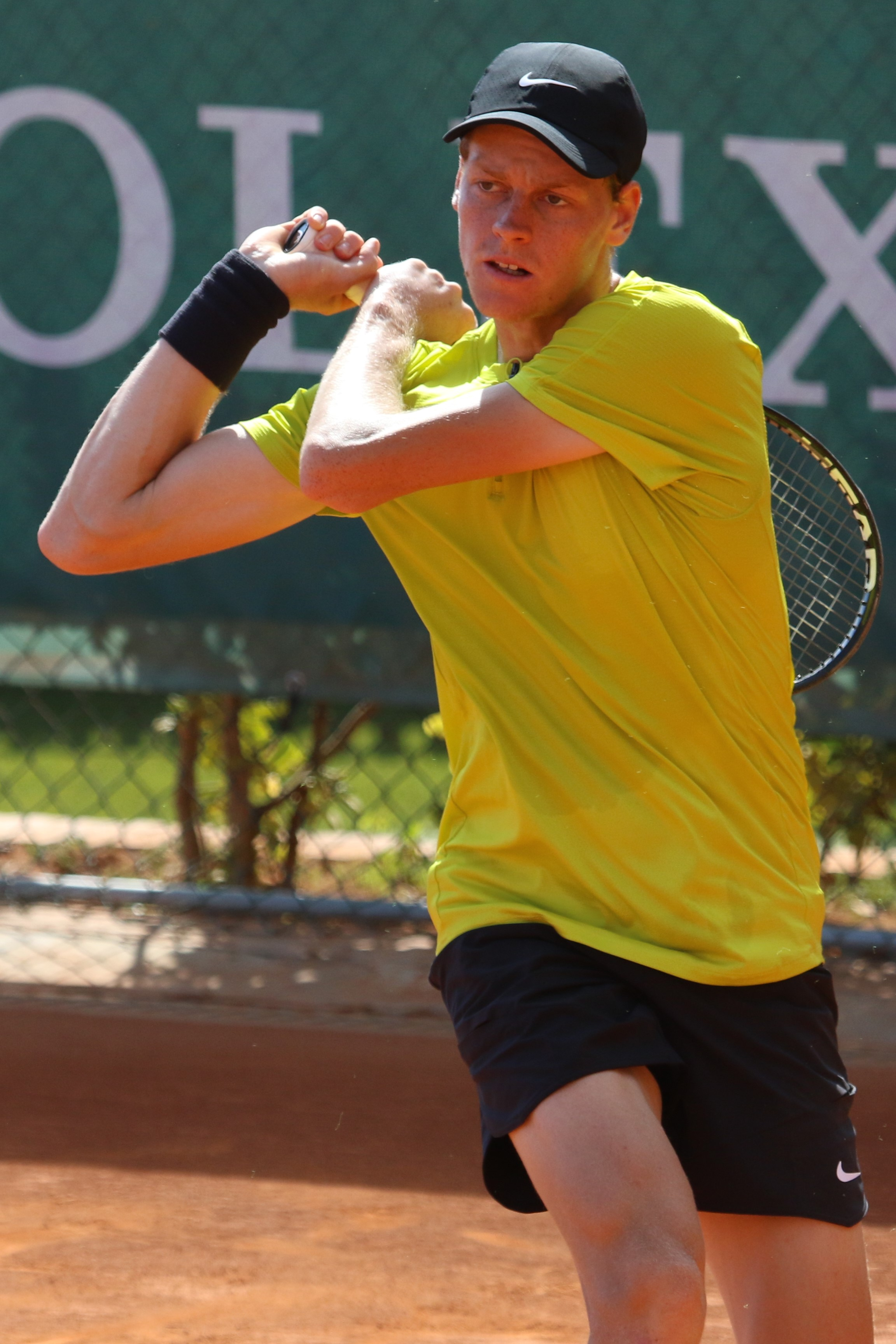
Novak Djokovic (left) and Jannik Sinner (right) are the only singles players to complete the Career Golden Masters, with Djokovic doing so twice. Djokovic also won a record 40 ATP Masters 1000 titles in singles. Sinner is the youngest and fastest player to complete the Golden Masters among all players.
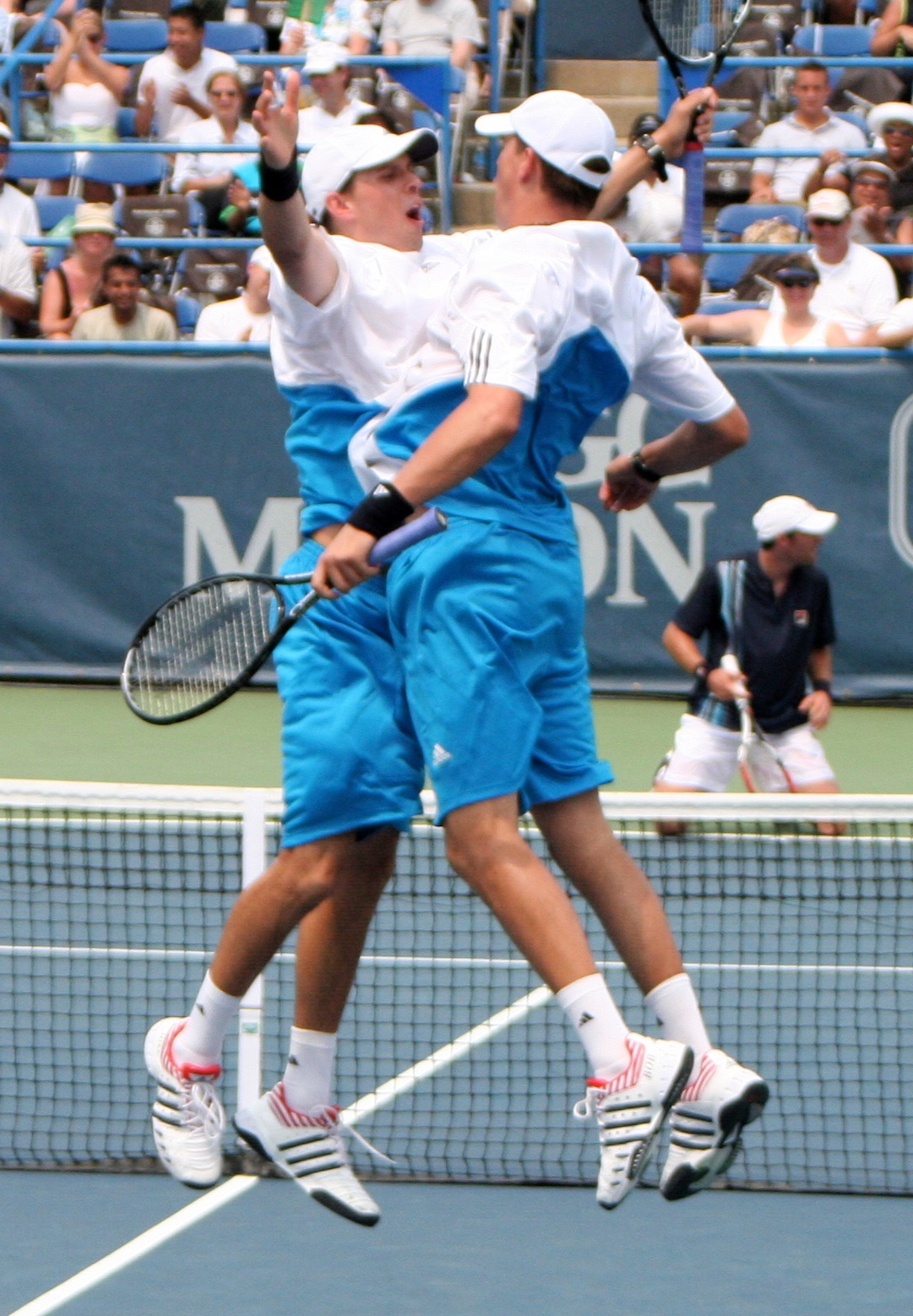
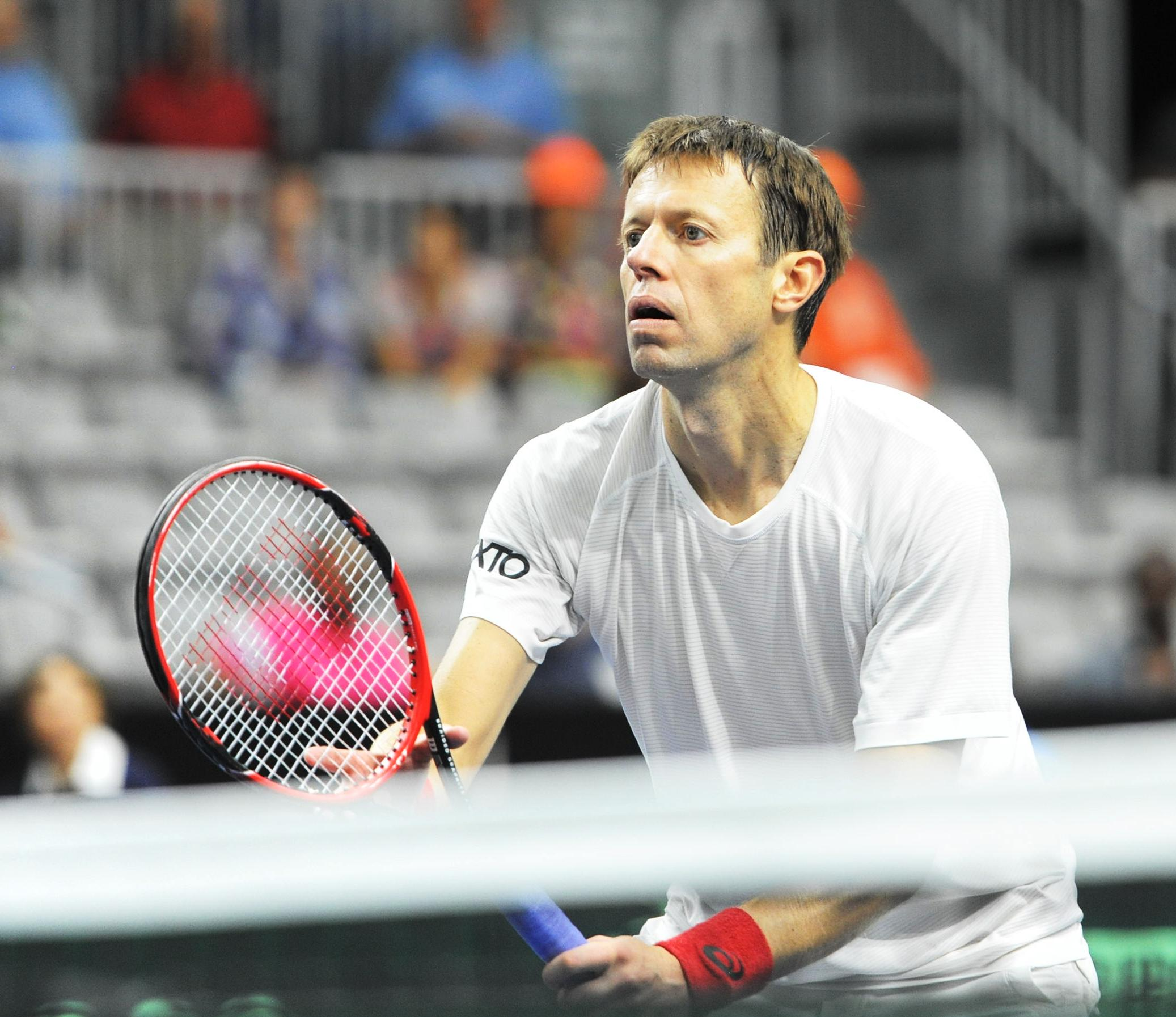
The Bryan brothers (left) and Daniel Nestor (right) are the only doubles players to complete the Career Golden Masters. The Bryan brothers also won a record 39 ATP Masters 1000 titles in doubles. Nestor is the first player to complete the Golden Masters among all players.

The ATP Masters 1000 tournaments, also known as Masters 1000 or ATP 1000 events, are an annual series of nine tennis tournaments featuring the top-ranked players on the ATP Tour since its inception in 1990. The ATP 1000 events sit below the Grand Slam tournaments and the year-end championships in prestige on the annual ATP Tour calendar; these tournaments plus the quadrennial Summer Olympics are collectively known as the 'Big Titles'.

In singles, Novak Djokovic holds the record for the most ATP 1000 singles titles with 40. By completing the career set of all nine current ATP 1000 series singles titles in 2018, Djokovic became the first player to achieve the Career Golden Masters in singles. In 2026, Jannik Sinner became the second, and youngest, player to complete the Career Golden Masters at the age of 24.

In doubles, the Bryan brothers (Bob and Mike) won a record 39 doubles titles as a team. Daniel Nestor and the Bryan brothers are the only doubles players to achieve the Career Golden Masters. All three doubles players also won titles at 10 different tournaments.

Out of the five male players who achieved the Career Golden Masters, Daniel Nestor is the first player to achieve the feat in 2011 and Sinner is the fastest player to complete the same feat in a record span of 33 months. In 2020, Djokovic has become the only player to complete the same feat twice.

== History ==
The ATP Championship Series (Single Week) was introduced in 1990 with the inception of the ATP Tour by bringing together the nine most prestigious tournaments of the Grand Prix Super Series of the preceding ITF Grand Prix Circuit. Results in ATP 1000 events earn players more ranking points than regular tournaments but less than Grand Slam events or the year-end ATP Finals.

Up until 2007, most ATP Masters 1000 finals were contested as best-of-five-set matches, but from 2008 all events were decided in best-of-three-set matches. As part of a shake-up of the tennis circuit in 2009, the Masters Series became the ATP Masters 1000, with the addition of the number 1000 referring to the number of ranking points earned by the winner of each tournament. Contrary to earlier plans, the number of tournaments was not reduced from nine to eight and the Monte-Carlo Masters remained part of the series although, unlike the other events, it does not have a mandatory player commitment. The Hamburg Masters event was downgraded to an ATP Tour 500 event. The Madrid Open moved to May and onto clay courts. A new tournament in Shanghai replaced the Hamburg Masters and took over Madrid's former October indoor slot.

In 2011, six of the nine 1000 level tournaments were combined ATP and WTA events. In 2025, all tournaments introduced the Video Review system, starting with the Indian Wells Open.

=== Series name ===
- 1990–1995: ATP Championship Series, Single Week
- 1996–1999: ATP Super 9
- 2000–2003: Tennis Masters Series
- 2004–2008: ATP Masters Series
- 2009–2018: ATP World Tour Masters 1000
- 2019–present: ATP Masters 1000

== Points distribution ==
The following ranking points are as of 2025.

Event (Note: As the ATP Masters Series (2004–2008), winners were awarded 500 points and finalists were awarded 350 points.)	W	F	SF	QF	R16	R32	R64	R128	Q	Q2	Q1
Singles (96 draws)	1000	650	400	200	100	50	30	10 (Note: Players with byes losing their first match receive first round points.)	20	10	N/A
Singles (56 draws)	1000	650	400	200	100	50	10	N/A	30	16	N/A
Doubles	1000	600	360	180	90	N/A					

== Tournaments ==
Currently, the following nine tournaments are part of the ATP Masters 1000: Canadian Open (alternating yearly between Montreal and Toronto), Italian Open (held in Rome), Indian Wells Open, Miami Open, Monte-Carlo Masters, Madrid Open, Cincinnati Open, Shanghai Masters and Paris Masters. Since 2009, five of the tournaments have been held on outdoor hard courts, three on clay and one on indoor hard court, whereas from 1990 until 2008 there were two indoor tournaments at the top-9 level. In 2009, the Shanghai Masters replaced the Madrid Open, which was until then held as an indoor event, in the eighth slot of the year with the Madrid Open switched to clay courts, replacing the Hamburg Open in the spring clay court season. The Shanghai Masters was designated as an outdoor event despite the facility having a retractable roof and having been used as the indoor venue for the ATP Finals from 2005 until 2008. Other than Hamburg, the tournaments defunct between 1990 and 2009 were Stockholm (1990–1994) and Stuttgart (1995–2001), which were held as indoor events in the eighth slot.

On October 23, 2025, the ATP announced that a new Masters 1000 tournament (the tenth on the calendar) will be held in Saudi Arabia, likely beginning in 2028, although the specific date remains to be determined. The placement of the event on the ATP calendar has also not been announced. The field will be 56 players and the event will be non-mandatory. This will be the first time the ATP Masters 1000 events number ten in one calendar year.

=== Current ===
Tournament	Founded	Location	Venue	Surface	Draw	Date
Indian Wells Open	1974	Indian Wells, United States	Indian Wells Tennis Garden	Hard	96	March 5–16
Miami Open	1985	Miami, United States	Hard Rock Stadium	Hard	96	March 19–30
Monte-Carlo Masters (Note: The Monte-Carlo Masters, despite its name, is held in Roquebrune-Cap-Martin, France, not in Monaco.)	1896	Roquebrune-Cap-Martin, France	Monte Carlo Country Club	Clay	56	April 6–13
Madrid Open	2002	Madrid, Spain	La Caja Mágica (Note: Madrid Masters was played in the Madrid Arena on an indoor hardcourt from 2002 to 2008.)	Clay	96	April 22 – May 4
Italian Open	1930	Rome, Italy	Foro Italico	Clay	96	May 7–18
Canadian Open	1881	Montreal / Toronto, Canada (Note: The men's Canadian Open is held in Montreal in even-numbered years and Toronto in odd-numbered years, alternating with the women's event.)	IGA Stadium / Sobeys Stadium	Hard	96	July 27 – August 7
Cincinnati Open	1899	Mason, United States	Lindner Family Tennis Center	Hard	96	August 11–23
Shanghai Masters	2009	Shanghai, China	Qizhong Forest Sports City Arena	Hard	96	October 1–12
Paris Masters	1969	Nanterre, France	Paris La Défense Arena	Hard (i)	56	October 27 – November 2

=== Past ===
Tournament	Location	Venue	Surface	Status
Hamburg Masters (1990–2008)	Hamburg, Germany	Am Rothenbaum	Clay	ATP 500
Stuttgart Masters (1995–2001)	Stuttgart, Germany	Hanns-Martin-Schleyer-Halle	Carpet (95–1997)/ Hard (i (Note: I indicates indoors.)) (98–2001)	N/A (Defunct)
Stockholm Open (1990–1994)	Stockholm, Sweden	Stockholm Globe Arena	Hard/Carpet (i)	ATP 250

=== Future ===
Tournament	Location	Venue	Surface	Draw	Date
Saudi Arabia Open	Saudi Arabia	TBD	Hard	56	TBD

Location map of current ATP 1000 events

== 2026 finals ==
* First-time champion
§ Career Golden Masters

ATP Masters 1000	Singles champions	Runners-up	Score	Doubles champions	Runners-up	Score
Indian Wells Open Singles – Doubles	(Italy) Jannik Sinner	Daniil Medvedev	7–6^{(8–6)}, 7–6^{(7–4)}	(Argentina) Guido Andreozzi* (France) Manuel Guinard	(France) Arthur Rinderknech (Monaco) Valentin Vacherot	7–6^{(7–3)}, 6–3
Miami Open Singles – Doubles	(Italy) Jannik Sinner	(Czech Republic) Jiří Lehečka	6–4, 6–4	(Italy) Simone Bolelli* (Italy) Andrea Vavassori*	(Finland) Harri Heliövaara (United Kingdom) Henry Patten	6–4, 6–2
Monte-Carlo Masters Singles – Doubles	(Italy) Jannik Sinner	(Spain) Carlos Alcaraz	7–6^{(7–5)}, 6–3	(Germany) Kevin Krawietz (Germany) Tim Pütz	(El Salvador) Marcelo Arévalo (Croatia) Mate Pavić	4–6, 6–2, [10–8]
Madrid Open Singles – Doubles	(Italy) Jannik Sinner	(Germany) Alexander Zverev	6–1, 6–2	(Finland) Harri Heliövaara (United Kingdom) Henry Patten	(Argentina) Guido Andreozzi (France) Manuel Guinard	6–3, 3–6, [10–7]
Italian Open Singles – Doubles	(Italy) Jannik Sinner^{§}	(Norway) Casper Ruud	6–4, 6–4	(Italy) Simone Bolelli (Italy) Andrea Vavassori	(Spain) Marcel Granollers (Argentina) Horacio Zeballos	7–6^{(10–8)}, 6–7^{(3–7)}, [10–3]
Canadian Open Singles – Doubles	(United States) Ben Shelton	(United States) Brandon Nakashima	6–3, 7–6^{(7–4)}	(Brazil) Orlando Luz* (Brazil) Rafael Matos*	(Croatia) Mate Pavić (El Salvador) Marcelo Arévalo	5–7, 6–4, [10–6]
Cincinnati Open Singles – Doubles	(France) Arthur Fils*	(United States) Frances Tiafoe	6–3, 1–6, 6–0	(Brazil) Orlando Luz (Brazil) Rafael Matos	(Germany) Constantin Frantzen (Netherlands) Robin Haase	6–4, 3–6, [10–7]
Shanghai Masters Singles – Doubles	(Spain) Alejandro Davidovich Fokina*	(Spain) Rafael Jodar	1–6, 7–6^{(7–5)}, 6–4	(Austria) Lucas Miedler* (Austria) Neil Oberleitner*	(Portugal) Francisco Cabral (United States) James Tracy	6–3, 6-4
Paris Masters Singles – Doubles	(Spain) Carlos Alcaraz	(United States) Ben Shelton	7–6^{(7–5)}, 7–5	(France) Quentin Halys (France) Pierre-Hugues Herbert	(United States) Christian Harrison (United Kingdom) Neal Skupski	7–6^{(7–3)}, 6–7^{(4–7)}, [10–8]

== Past finals ==
* First-time champion
§ Career Golden Masters

=== 1990 ===
Masters	Singles champions	Runners-up	Score	Doubles champions	Runners-up	Score
Indian Wells Singles – Doubles	(Sweden) Stefan Edberg*	(United States) Andre Agassi	6–4, 5–7, 7–6^{(7–1)}, 7–6^{(8–6)}	(Germany) Boris Becker* (France) Guy Forget*	(United States) Jim Grabb (United States) Patrick McEnroe	6–4, 6–3
Miami Singles – Doubles	(United States) Andre Agassi*	(Sweden) Stefan Edberg	6–1, 6–4, 0–6, 6–2	(United States) Rick Leach* (United States) Jim Pugh*	(Germany) Boris Becker (Brazil) Cássio Motta	6–3, 6–4
Monte Carlo Singles – Doubles	(Soviet Union) Andrei Chesnokov*	(Austria) Thomas Muster	7–5, 6–3, 6–3	(Czechoslovakia) Petr Korda* (Czechoslovakia) Tomáš Šmíd*	(Ecuador) Andrés Gómez (Spain) Javier Sánchez	6–2, 6–1
Hamburg Singles – Doubles	(Spain) Juan Aguilera*	(Germany) Boris Becker	6–1, 6–0, 7–6^{(9–7)}	(Spain) Sergi Bruguera* (United States) Jim Courier*	(Germany) Udo Riglewski (Germany) Michael Stich	4–6, 6–1, 7–6
Rome Singles – Doubles	(Austria) Thomas Muster*	(Soviet Union) Andrei Chesnokov	6–1, 6–3, 6–1	(Spain) Sergio Casal* (Spain) Emilio Sánchez*	(United States) Jim Courier (United States) Martin Davis	7–6, 7–5
Toronto Singles – Doubles	(United States) Michael Chang*	(United States) Jay Berger	4–6, 6–3, 7–6^{(7–2)}	(United States) Paul Annacone* (United States) David Wheaton*	(Australia) Broderick Dyke (Sweden) Peter Lundgren	7–6, 6–1
Cincinnati Singles – Doubles	(Sweden) Stefan Edberg	(United States) Brad Gilbert	6–1, 6–1	(Australia) Darren Cahill* (Australia) Mark Kratzmann*	(United Kingdom) Neil Broad (South Africa) Gary Muller	7–6, 6–4
Stockholm Singles – Doubles	(Germany) Boris Becker*	(Sweden) Stefan Edberg	6–4, 6–0, 6–3	(France) Guy Forget	(Australia) John Fitzgerald (Sweden) Anders Järryd	6–2, 6–3
Stockholm Singles – Doubles	(Germany) Boris Becker*	(Sweden) Stefan Edberg	6–4, 6–0, 6–3	(Switzerland) Jakob Hlasek*	(Australia) John Fitzgerald (Sweden) Anders Järryd	6–2, 6–3
Paris Singles – Doubles	(Sweden) Stefan Edberg	(Germany) Boris Becker	3–3 ret.	(United States) Scott Davis* (United States) David Pate*	(Australia) Darren Cahill (Australia) Mark Kratzmann	7–6, 7–6

=== 1991 ===
Masters	Singles champions	Runners-up	Score	Doubles champions	Runners-up	Score
Indian Wells Singles – Doubles	(United States) Jim Courier*	(France) Guy Forget	4–6, 6–3, 4–6, 6–3, 7–6^{(7–4)}	(United States) Jim Courier	(France) Guy Forget (France) Henri Leconte	7–6, 6–1
Indian Wells Singles – Doubles	(United States) Jim Courier*	(France) Guy Forget	4–6, 6–3, 4–6, 6–3, 7–6^{(7–4)}	(Spain) Javier Sánchez*	(France) Guy Forget (France) Henri Leconte	7–6, 6–1
Miami Singles – Doubles	(United States) Jim Courier	(United States) David Wheaton	4–6, 6–3, 6–4	(South Africa) Wayne Ferreira* (South Africa) Piet Norval*	(United States) Ken Flach (United States) Robert Seguso	5–7, 7–6, 6–2
Monte Carlo Singles – Doubles	(Spain) Sergi Bruguera*	(Germany) Boris Becker	5–7, 6–4, 7–6^{(8–6)}, 7–6^{(7–4)}	(United States) Luke Jensen* (Australia) Laurie Warder*	(Netherlands) Paul Haarhuis (Netherlands) Mark Koevermans	6–4, 6–3
Hamburg Singles – Doubles	(Czechoslovakia) Karel Nováček*	(Sweden) Magnus Gustafsson	6–3, 6–3, 5–7, 0–6, 6–1	(Spain) Sergio Casal (Spain) Emilio Sánchez	(Brazil) Cássio Motta (South Africa) Danie Visser	7–6, 7–6
Rome Singles – Doubles	(Spain) Emilio Sánchez*	(Argentina) Alberto Mancini	6–3, 6–1, 3–0 ret.	(Italy) Omar Camporese* (Croatia) Goran Ivanišević*	(United States) Luke Jensen (Australia) Laurie Warder	6–2, 6–3
Montreal Singles – Doubles	(Soviet Union) Andrei Chesnokov	(Czechoslovakia) Petr Korda	3–6, 6–4, 6–3	(United States) Patrick Galbraith* (United States) Todd Witsken*	(Canada) Grant Connell (Canada) Glenn Michibata	6–4, 3–6, 6–1
Cincinnati Singles – Doubles	(France) Guy Forget*	(United States) Pete Sampras	2–6, 7–6^{(7–4)}, 6–4	(United States) Ken Flach* (United States) Robert Seguso*	(Canada) Grant Connell (Canada) Glenn Michibata	6–3, 6–4
Stockholm Singles – Doubles	(Germany) Boris Becker	(Sweden) Stefan Edberg	3–6, 6–4, 1–6, 6–2, 6–2	(Australia) John Fitzgerald* (Sweden) Anders Järryd*	(Netherlands) Tom Nijssen (Czechoslovakia) Cyril Suk	7–5, 6–3
Paris Singles – Doubles	(France) Guy Forget	(United States) Pete Sampras	7–6^{(11–9)}, 4–6, 5–7, 6–4, 6–4	(Australia) John Fitzgerald (Sweden) Anders Järryd	(United States) Kelly Jones (United States) Rick Leach	7–6, 6–4

=== 1992 ===
Masters	Singles champions	Runners-up	Score	Doubles champions	Runners-up	Score
Indian Wells Singles – Doubles	(United States) Michael Chang	(Commonwealth of Independent States) Andrei Chesnokov	6–3, 6–4, 7–5	(United States) Steve DeVries* (Australia) David Macpherson*	(United States) Kent Kinnear (United States) Sven Salumaa	6–3, 2–6, 6–4
Miami Singles – Doubles	(United States) Michael Chang	(Argentina) Alberto Mancini	7–5, 7–5	(United States) Ken Flach (United States) Todd Witsken	(United States) Kent Kinnear (United States) Sven Salumaa	6–4, 6–3
Monte Carlo Singles – Doubles	(Austria) Thomas Muster	(United States) Aaron Krickstein	6–3, 6–1, 6–3	(Germany) Boris Becker	(Czechoslovakia) Petr Korda (Czechoslovakia) Karel Nováček	3–6, 6–1, 6–4
Monte Carlo Singles – Doubles	(Austria) Thomas Muster	(United States) Aaron Krickstein	6–3, 6–1, 6–3	(Germany) Michael Stich*	(Czechoslovakia) Petr Korda (Czechoslovakia) Karel Nováček	3–6, 6–1, 6–4
Hamburg Singles – Doubles	(Sweden) Stefan Edberg	(Germany) Michael Stich	5–7, 6–4, 6–1	(Spain) Sergio Casal (Spain) Emilio Sánchez	(Germany) Carl-Uwe Steeb (Germany) Michael Stich	6–3, 3–6, 6–4
Rome Singles – Doubles	(United States) Jim Courier	(Spain) Carlos Costa	7–6^{(7–3)}, 6–0, 6–4	(Switzerland) Jakob Hlasek	(South Africa) Wayne Ferreira (Australia) Mark Kratzmann	6–4, 3–6, 6–1
Rome Singles – Doubles	(United States) Jim Courier	(Spain) Carlos Costa	7–6^{(7–3)}, 6–0, 6–4	(Switzerland) Marc Rosset*	(South Africa) Wayne Ferreira (Australia) Mark Kratzmann	6–4, 3–6, 6–1
Toronto Singles – Doubles	(United States) Andre Agassi	(United States) Ivan Lendl	3–6, 6–2, 6–0	(South Africa) Danie Visser*	(United States) Andre Agassi (United States) John McEnroe	6–4, 6–4
Toronto Singles – Doubles	(United States) Andre Agassi	(United States) Ivan Lendl	3–6, 6–2, 6–0	(United States) Patrick Galbraith	(United States) Andre Agassi (United States) John McEnroe	6–4, 6–4
Cincinnati Singles – Doubles	(United States) Pete Sampras*	(United States) Ivan Lendl	6–3, 3–6, 6–3	(Australia) Todd Woodbridge* (Australia) Mark Woodforde*	(United States) Patrick McEnroe (United States) Jonathan Stark	7–6, 6–4
Stockholm Singles – Doubles	(Croatia) Goran Ivanišević*	(France) Guy Forget	7–6^{(7–2)}, 4–6, 7–6^{(7–5)}, 6–2	(Australia) Mark Woodforde (Australia) Todd Woodbridge	(United States) Steve DeVries (Australia) David Macpherson	6–4, 6–4
Paris Singles – Doubles	(Germany) Boris Becker	(France) Guy Forget	7–6^{(7–3)}, 6–3, 3–6, 6–3	(United States) John McEnroe* (United States) Patrick McEnroe*	(United States) Patrick Galbraith (South Africa) Danie Visser	7–6, 6–3

=== 1993 ===
Masters	Singles champions	Runners-up	Score	Doubles champions	Runners-up	Score
Indian Wells Singles – Doubles	(United States) Jim Courier	(South Africa) Wayne Ferreira	6–3, 6–3, 6–1	(France) Guy Forget	(United States) Luke Jensen (United States) Scott Melville	4–6, 6–2, 7–6
Indian Wells Singles – Doubles	(United States) Jim Courier	(South Africa) Wayne Ferreira	6–3, 6–3, 6–1	(France) Henri Leconte*	(United States) Luke Jensen (United States) Scott Melville	4–6, 6–2, 7–6
Miami Singles – Doubles	(United States) Pete Sampras	(United States) MaliVai Washington	6–3, 6–2	(Netherlands) Richard Krajicek* (Netherlands) Jan Siemerink*	(United States) Patrick McEnroe (United States) Jonathan Stark	6–7, 6–4, 7–6
Monte Carlo Singles – Doubles	(Spain) Sergi Bruguera	(France) Cédric Pioline	7–6^{(7–2)}, 6–0	(Sweden) Stefan Edberg*	(Netherlands) Paul Haarhuis (Netherlands) Mark Koevermans	6–2, 2–6, 7–5
Monte Carlo Singles – Doubles	(Spain) Sergi Bruguera	(France) Cédric Pioline	7–6^{(7–2)}, 6–0	(Czech Republic) Petr Korda	(Netherlands) Paul Haarhuis (Netherlands) Mark Koevermans	6–2, 2–6, 7–5
Hamburg Singles – Doubles	(Germany) Michael Stich*	(Russia) Andrei Chesnokov	6–3, 6–7^{(1–7)}, 7–6^{(9–7)}, 6–4	(Netherlands) Paul Haarhuis* (Netherlands) Mark Koevermans*	(Canada) Grant Connell (United States) Patrick Galbraith	7–6, 6–4
Rome Singles – Doubles	(United States) Jim Courier	(Croatia) Goran Ivanišević	6–1, 6–2, 6–2	(Netherlands) Jacco Eltingh*	(South Africa) Wayne Ferreira (Australia) Mark Kratzmann	6–4, 7–6
Rome Singles – Doubles	(United States) Jim Courier	(Croatia) Goran Ivanišević	6–1, 6–2, 6–2	(Netherlands) Paul Haarhuis	(South Africa) Wayne Ferreira (Australia) Mark Kratzmann	6–4, 7–6
Montreal Singles – Doubles	(Sweden) Mikael Pernfors*	(United States) Todd Martin	2–6, 6–2, 7–5	(United States) Jim Courier	(Canada) Glenn Michibata (United States) David Pate	6–1 1–6 7–6
Montreal Singles – Doubles	(Sweden) Mikael Pernfors*	(United States) Todd Martin	2–6, 6–2, 7–5	(The Bahamas) Mark Knowles*	(Canada) Glenn Michibata (United States) David Pate	6–1 1–6 7–6
Cincinnati Singles – Doubles	(United States) Michael Chang	(Sweden) Stefan Edberg	7–5, 0–6, 6–4	(United States) Andre Agassi*	(Sweden) Stefan Edberg (Sweden) Henrik Holm	6–4, 7–6
Cincinnati Singles – Doubles	(United States) Michael Chang	(Sweden) Stefan Edberg	7–5, 0–6, 6–4	(Czech Republic) Petr Korda	(Sweden) Stefan Edberg (Sweden) Henrik Holm	6–4, 7–6
Stockholm Singles – Doubles	(Germany) Michael Stich	(Croatia) Goran Ivanišević	4–6, 7–6^{(8–6)}, 7–6^{(7–3)}, 6–2	(Australia) Mark Woodforde (Australia) Todd Woodbridge	(South Africa) Gary Muller (South Africa) Danie Visser	7–6, 5–7, 7–6
Paris Singles – Doubles	(Croatia) Goran Ivanišević	(Ukraine) Andriy Medvedev	6–4, 6–2, 7–6^{(7–2)}	(Zimbabwe) Byron Black* (United States) Jonathan Stark*	(Netherlands) Tom Nijssen (Czech Republic) Cyril Suk	7–6, 6–4

=== 1994 ===
Masters	Singles champions	Runners-up	Score	Doubles champions	Runners-up	Score
Indian Wells Singles – Doubles	(United States) Pete Sampras	(Czech Republic) Petr Korda	4–6, 6–3, 3–6, 6–3, 6–2	(Canada) Grant Connell*	(Zimbabwe) Byron Black (United States) Jonathan Stark	3–6, 6–1, 7–6
Indian Wells Singles – Doubles	(United States) Pete Sampras	(Czech Republic) Petr Korda	4–6, 6–3, 3–6, 6–3, 6–2	(United States) Patrick Galbraith	(Zimbabwe) Byron Black (United States) Jonathan Stark	3–6, 6–1, 7–6
Miami Singles – Doubles	(United States) Pete Sampras	(United States) Andre Agassi	5–7, 6–3, 6–3	(Netherlands) Jacco Eltingh (Netherlands) Paul Haarhuis	(The Bahamas) Mark Knowles (United States) Jared Palmer	7–6, 7–6
Monte Carlo Singles – Doubles	(Ukraine) Andriy Medvedev*	(Spain) Sergi Bruguera	7–5, 6–1, 6–3	(Sweden) Nicklas Kulti* (Sweden) Magnus Larsson*	(Russia) Yevgeny Kafelnikov (Czech Republic) Daniel Vacek	3–6, 7–6, 6–4
Hamburg Singles – Doubles	(Ukraine) Andriy Medvedev	(Russia) Yevgeny Kafelnikov	6–4, 6–4, 3–6, 6–3	(United States) Scott Melville*	(Sweden) Henrik Holm (Sweden) Anders Järryd	7–6, 6–3
Hamburg Singles – Doubles	(Ukraine) Andriy Medvedev	(Russia) Yevgeny Kafelnikov	6–4, 6–4, 3–6, 6–3	(South Africa) Piet Norval	(Sweden) Henrik Holm (Sweden) Anders Järryd	7–6, 6–3
Rome Singles – Doubles	(United States) Pete Sampras	(Germany) Boris Becker	6–1, 6–2, 6–2	(Russia) Yevgeny Kafelnikov* (Czech Republic) David Rikl*	(South Africa) Wayne Ferreira (Spain) Javier Sánchez	6–1, 7–5
Toronto Singles – Doubles	(United States) Andre Agassi	(Australia) Jason Stoltenberg	6–4, 6–4	(Zimbabwe) Byron Black (United States) Jonathan Stark	(United States) Jared Palmer (United States) Patrick McEnroe	6–4, 6–4
Cincinnati Singles – Doubles	(United States) Michael Chang	(Sweden) Stefan Edberg	6–2, 7–5	(United States) Alex O'Brien* (Australia) Sandon Stolle*	(South Africa) Wayne Ferreira (Australia) Mark Kratzmann	7–6, 3–6, 6–3
Stockholm Singles – Doubles	(Germany) Boris Becker	(Croatia) Goran Ivanišević	4–6, 6–4, 6–3, 7–6^{(7–4)}	(Australia) Mark Woodforde (Australia) Todd Woodbridge	(Sweden) Jan Apell (Sweden) Jonas Björkman	6–4, 4–6, 6–3
Paris Singles – Doubles	(United States) Andre Agassi	(Switzerland) Marc Rosset	6–3, 6–3, 4–6, 7–5	(Netherlands) Jacco Eltingh (Netherlands) Paul Haarhuis	(Zimbabwe) Byron Black (United States) Jonathan Stark	6–4, 6–3

=== 1995 ===
Masters	Singles champions	Runners-up	Score	Doubles champions	Runners-up	Score
Indian Wells Singles – Doubles	(United States) Pete Sampras	(United States) Andre Agassi	7–5, 6–3, 7–5	(United States) Tommy Ho* (New Zealand) Brett Steven*	(South Africa) Gary Muller (South Africa) Piet Norval	7–6, 6–7, 6–4
Miami Singles – Doubles	(United States) Andre Agassi	(United States) Pete Sampras	3–6, 6–2, 7–6^{(7–4)}	(Australia) Todd Woodbridge (Australia) Mark Woodforde	(United States) Jim Grabb (United States) Patrick McEnroe	6–3, 7–6
Monte Carlo Singles – Doubles	(Austria) Thomas Muster	(Germany) Boris Becker	4–6, 5–7, 6–1, 7–6^{(8–6)}, 6–0	(Netherlands) Jacco Eltingh (Netherlands) Paul Haarhuis	(Argentina) Luis Lobo (Spain) Javier Sánchez	6–1, 6–2
Hamburg Singles – Doubles	(Ukraine) Andriy Medvedev	(Croatia) Goran Ivanišević	6–3, 6–2, 6–1	(South Africa) Wayne Ferreira (Russia) Yevgeny Kafelnikov	(Zimbabwe) Byron Black (Russia) Andrei Olhovskiy	7–6, 6–0
Rome Singles – Doubles	(Austria) Thomas Muster	(Spain) Sergi Bruguera	3–6, 7–6^{(7–5)}, 6–2, 6–3	(Czech Republic) Cyril Suk* (Czech Republic) Daniel Vacek*	(Sweden) Jan Apell (Sweden) Jonas Björkman	6–3, 6–4
Montreal Singles – Doubles	(United States) Andre Agassi	(United States) Pete Sampras	3–6, 6–2, 6–3	(Russia) Yevgeny Kafelnikov	(United States) Brian MacPhie (Australia) Sandon Stolle	6–4, 6–4
Montreal Singles – Doubles	(United States) Andre Agassi	(United States) Pete Sampras	3–6, 6–2, 6–3	(Russia) Andrei Olhovskiy*	(United States) Brian MacPhie (Australia) Sandon Stolle	6–4, 6–4
Cincinnati Singles – Doubles	(United States) Andre Agassi	(United States) Michael Chang	7–5, 6–2	(Australia) Todd Woodbridge (Australia) Mark Woodforde	(The Bahamas) Mark Knowles (Canada) Daniel Nestor	6–4, 6–4
Essen Singles – Doubles	(Austria) Thomas Muster	(United States) MaliVai Washington	7–6^{(8–6)}, 2–6, 6–3, 6–4	(Netherlands) Jacco Eltingh (Netherlands) Paul Haarhuis	(Czech Republic) Cyril Suk (Czech Republic) Daniel Vacek	7–5, 6–7, 6–4
Paris Singles – Doubles	(United States) Pete Sampras	(Germany) Boris Becker	7–6^{(7–5)}, 6–4, 6–4	(Canada) Grant Connell (United States) Patrick Galbraith	(United States) Jim Grabb (United States) Todd Martin	6–3, 7–6

=== 1996 ===
Masters	Singles champions	Runners-up	Score	Doubles champions	Runners-up	Score
Indian Wells Singles – Doubles	(United States) Michael Chang	(Netherlands) Paul Haarhuis	7–5, 6–1, 6–1	(Australia) Todd Woodbridge (Australia) Mark Woodforde	(United States) Brian MacPhie (Australia) Michael Tebbutt	6–3, 6–4
Miami Singles – Doubles	(United States) Andre Agassi	(Croatia) Goran Ivanišević	3–0 ret.	(Australia) Todd Woodbridge (Australia) Mark Woodforde	(South Africa) Ellis Ferreira (United States) Patrick Galbraith	6–1, 6–3
Monte Carlo Singles – Doubles	(Austria) Thomas Muster	(Spain) Albert Costa	6–3, 5–7, 4–6, 6–3, 6–2	(South Africa) Ellis Ferreira*	(Sweden) Jonas Björkman (Sweden) Nicklas Kulti	6–2, 6–7, 6–2
Monte Carlo Singles – Doubles	(Austria) Thomas Muster	(Spain) Albert Costa	6–3, 5–7, 4–6, 6–3, 6–2	(Netherlands) Jan Siemerink	(Sweden) Jonas Björkman (Sweden) Nicklas Kulti	6–2, 6–7, 6–2
Hamburg Singles – Doubles	(Spain) Roberto Carretero*	(Spain) Àlex Corretja	2–6, 6–4, 6–4, 6–4	(The Bahamas) Mark Knowles	(France) Guy Forget (Switzerland) Jakob Hlasek	6–4, 7–6
Hamburg Singles – Doubles	(Spain) Roberto Carretero*	(Spain) Àlex Corretja	2–6, 6–4, 6–4, 6–4	(Canada) Daniel Nestor*	(France) Guy Forget (Switzerland) Jakob Hlasek	6–4, 7–6
Rome Singles – Doubles	(Austria) Thomas Muster	(Netherlands) Richard Krajicek	6–2, 6–4, 3–6, 6–3	(Zimbabwe) Byron Black (Canada) Grant Connell	(Czech Republic) Libor Pimek (South Africa) Byron Talbot	6–2, 6–3
Cincinnati Singles – Doubles	(United States) Andre Agassi	(United States) Michael Chang	7–6^{(7–4)}, 6–4	(The Bahamas) Mark Knowles (Canada) Daniel Nestor	(Australia) Sandon Stolle (Czech Republic) Cyril Suk	6–2, 7–5
Toronto Singles – Doubles	(South Africa) Wayne Ferreira*	(Australia) Todd Woodbridge	6–2, 6–4	(United States) Patrick Galbraith (Netherlands) Paul Haarhuis	(The Bahamas) Mark Knowles (Canada) Daniel Nestor	7–6, 6–3
Stuttgart Singles – Doubles	(Germany) Boris Becker	(United States) Pete Sampras	3–6, 6–3, 3–6, 6–3, 6–4	(Canada) Sébastien Lareau*	(Netherlands) Jacco Eltingh (Netherlands) Paul Haarhuis	6–4, 6–4
Stuttgart Singles – Doubles	(Germany) Boris Becker	(United States) Pete Sampras	3–6, 6–3, 3–6, 6–3, 6–4	(United States) Alex O'Brien	(Netherlands) Jacco Eltingh (Netherlands) Paul Haarhuis	6–4, 6–4
Paris Singles – Doubles	(Sweden) Thomas Enqvist*	(Russia) Yevgeny Kafelnikov	6–2, 6–4, 7–5	(Netherlands) Jacco Eltingh (Netherlands) Paul Haarhuis	(Russia) Yevgeny Kafelnikov (Czech Republic) Daniel Vacek	6–2, 6–4

=== 1997 ===
Masters	Singles champions	Runners-up	Score	Doubles champions	Runners-up	Score
Indian Wells Singles – Doubles	(United States) Michael Chang	(Czech Republic) Bohdan Ulihrach	4–6, 6–3, 6–4, 6–3	(The Bahamas) Mark Knowles (Canada) Daniel Nestor	(Australia) Mark Philippoussis (Australia) Patrick Rafter	7–5, 6–4
Miami Singles – Doubles	(Austria) Thomas Muster	(Spain) Sergi Bruguera	7–6^{(8–6)}, 6–3, 6–1	(Australia) Todd Woodbridge (Australia) Mark Woodforde	(The Bahamas) Mark Knowles (Canada) Daniel Nestor	7–6, 7–6
Monte Carlo Singles – Doubles	(Chile) Marcelo Ríos*	(Spain) Àlex Corretja	6–4, 6–3, 6–3	(United States) Donald Johnson* (United States) Francisco Montana*	(Netherlands) Jacco Eltingh (Netherlands) Paul Haarhuis	6–4, 6–4
Hamburg Singles – Doubles	(Ukraine) Andriy Medvedev	(Spain) Félix Mantilla	6–0, 6–4, 6–2	(Argentina) Luis Lobo*	(United Kingdom) Neil Broad (South Africa) Piet Norval	6–2, 3–6, 6–4
Hamburg Singles – Doubles	(Ukraine) Andriy Medvedev	(Spain) Félix Mantilla	6–0, 6–4, 6–2	(Spain) Javier Sánchez	(United Kingdom) Neil Broad (South Africa) Piet Norval	6–2, 3–6, 6–4
Rome Singles – Doubles	(Spain) Àlex Corretja*	(Chile) Marcelo Ríos	7–5, 7–5, 6–3	(The Bahamas) Mark Knowles (Canada) Daniel Nestor	(Zimbabwe) Byron Black (United States) Alex O'Brien	6–3, 4–6, 7–5
Montreal Singles – Doubles	(United States) Chris Woodruff*	(Brazil) Gustavo Kuerten	7–5, 4–6, 6–3	(India) Mahesh Bhupathi* (India) Leander Paes*	(Canada) Sébastien Lareau (United States) Alex O'Brien	4–6, 6–3, 6–4
Cincinnati Singles – Doubles	(United States) Pete Sampras	(Austria) Thomas Muster	6–3, 6–4	(Australia) Todd Woodbridge (Australia) Mark Woodforde	(Australia) Mark Philippoussis (Australia) Patrick Rafter	6–4, 6–2
Stuttgart Singles – Doubles	(Czech Republic) Petr Korda*	(Netherlands) Richard Krajicek	7–6^{(8–6)}, 6–2, 6–4	(Australia) Todd Woodbridge (Australia) Mark Woodforde	(United States) Rick Leach (United States) Jonathan Stark	7–6, 7–6
Paris Singles – Doubles	(United States) Pete Sampras	(Sweden) Jonas Björkman	6–3, 4–6, 6–3, 6–1	(Netherlands) Jacco Eltingh (Netherlands) Paul Haarhuis	(United States) Rick Leach (United States) Jonathan Stark	6–2, 6–4

=== 1998 ===
Masters	Singles champions	Runners-up	Score	Doubles champions	Runners-up	Score
Indian Wells Singles – Doubles	(Chile) Marcelo Ríos	(United Kingdom) Greg Rusedski	6–3, 6–7^{(15–17)}, 7–6^{(7–4)}, 6–4	(Sweden) Jonas Björkman*	(United States) Todd Martin (United States) Richey Reneberg	6–0, 6–3
Indian Wells Singles – Doubles	(Chile) Marcelo Ríos	(United Kingdom) Greg Rusedski	6–3, 6–7^{(15–17)}, 7–6^{(7–4)}, 6–4	(Australia) Patrick Rafter	(United States) Todd Martin (United States) Richey Reneberg	6–0, 6–3
Miami Singles – Doubles	(Chile) Marcelo Ríos	(United States) Andre Agassi	7–5, 6–3, 6–4	(South Africa) Ellis Ferreira (United States) Rick Leach	(United States) Alex O'Brien (United States) Jonathan Stark	6–2, 6–4
Monte Carlo Singles – Doubles	(Spain) Carlos Moyà*	(France) Cédric Pioline	6–3, 6–0, 7–5	(Netherlands) Jacco Eltingh (Netherlands) Paul Haarhuis	(Australia) Todd Woodbridge (Australia) Mark Woodforde	6–4, 6–2
Hamburg Singles – Doubles	(Spain) Albert Costa*	(Spain) Àlex Corretja	6–2, 6–0, 1–0 ret.	(United States) Donald Johnson (United States) Francisco Montana	(South Africa) David Adams (New Zealand) Brett Steven	6–4, 6–4
Rome Singles – Doubles	(Chile) Marcelo Ríos	(Spain) Albert Costa	W/O	(India) Mahesh Bhupathi (India) Leander Paes	(South Africa) Ellis Ferreira (United States) Rick Leach	6–4, 4–6, 7–6
Toronto Singles – Doubles	(Australia) Patrick Rafter*	(Netherlands) Richard Krajicek	7–6^{(7–3)}, 6–4	(Czech Republic) Martin Damm*	(South Africa) Ellis Ferreira (United States) Rick Leach	6–7, 6–2 7–6
Toronto Singles – Doubles	(Australia) Patrick Rafter*	(Netherlands) Richard Krajicek	7–6^{(7–3)}, 6–4	(United States) Jim Grabb	(South Africa) Ellis Ferreira (United States) Rick Leach	6–7, 6–2 7–6
Cincinnati Singles – Doubles	(Australia) Patrick Rafter	(United States) Pete Sampras	1–6, 7–6^{(7–2)}, 6–4	(The Bahamas) Mark Knowles (Canada) Daniel Nestor	(France) Olivier Delaître (France) Fabrice Santoro	6–7, 6–4, 6–4
Stuttgart Singles – Doubles	(Netherlands) Richard Krajicek*	(Russia) Yevgeny Kafelnikov	6–4, 6–3, 6–3	(Canada) Sébastien Lareau (United States) Alex O'Brien	(India) Mahesh Bhupathi (India) Leander Paes	4–6, 6–3, 7–5
Paris Singles – Doubles	(United Kingdom) Greg Rusedski*	(United States) Pete Sampras	6–4, 7–6^{(7–4)}, 6–3	(India) Mahesh Bhupathi (India) Leander Paes	(Netherlands) Jacco Eltingh (Netherlands) Paul Haarhuis	7–6, 7–6

=== 1999 ===
Masters	Singles champions	Runners-up	Score	Doubles champions	Runners-up	Score
Indian Wells Singles – Doubles	(Australia) Mark Philippoussis*	(Spain) Carlos Moyà	5–7, 6–4, 6–4, 4–6, 6–2	(Zimbabwe) Wayne Black*	(South Africa) Ellis Ferreira (United States) Rick Leach	6–3, 6–4
Indian Wells Singles – Doubles	(Australia) Mark Philippoussis*	(Spain) Carlos Moyà	5–7, 6–4, 6–4, 4–6, 6–2	(Australia) Sandon Stolle	(South Africa) Ellis Ferreira (United States) Rick Leach	6–3, 6–4
Miami Singles – Doubles	(Netherlands) Richard Krajicek	(France) Sébastien Grosjean	4–6, 6–1, 6–2, 7–5	(Zimbabwe) Wayne Black (Australia) Sandon Stolle	(Germany) Boris Becker (United States) Jan-Michael Gambill	6–1, 6–1
Monte Carlo Singles – Doubles	(Brazil) Gustavo Kuerten*	(Chile) Marcelo Ríos	6–4, 2–1 ret.	(France) Olivier Delaître* (United Kingdom) Tim Henman*	(Czech Republic) Jiří Novák (Czech Republic) David Rikl	3–6, 6–4, 6–2
Hamburg Singles – Doubles	(Chile) Marcelo Ríos	(Argentina) Mariano Zabaleta	6–7^{(5–7)}, 7–5, 5–7, 7–6^{(7–5)}, 6–2	(Australia) Wayne Arthurs* (Australia) Andrew Kratzmann*	(Netherlands) Paul Haarhuis (United States) Jared Palmer	4–6, 7–6, 6–4
Rome Singles – Doubles	(Brazil) Gustavo Kuerten	(Australia) Patrick Rafter	6–4, 7–5, 7–6^{(8–6)}	(South Africa) Ellis Ferreira (United States) Rick Leach	(South Africa) David Adams (South Africa) John–Laffnie de Jager	6–7, 6–1, 6–2
Montreal Singles – Doubles	(Sweden) Thomas Johansson*	(Russia) Yevgeny Kafelnikov	1–6, 6–3, 6–3	(Sweden) Jonas Björkman (Australia) Patrick Rafter	(Zimbabwe) Byron Black (South Africa) Wayne Ferreira	7–6, 6–4
Cincinnati Singles – Doubles	(United States) Pete Sampras	(Australia) Patrick Rafter	7–6^{(9–7)}, 6–3	(Sweden) Jonas Björkman (Zimbabwe) Byron Black	(Australia) Todd Woodbridge (Australia) Mark Woodforde	6–1, 2–6, 7–6
Stuttgart Singles – Doubles	(Sweden) Thomas Enqvist	(Netherlands) Richard Krajicek	6–1, 6–4, 5–7, 7–5	(Sweden) Jonas Björkman (Zimbabwe) Byron Black	(South Africa) David Adams (South Africa) John–Laffnie de Jager	6–3, 6–4
Paris Singles – Doubles	(United States) Andre Agassi	(Russia) Marat Safin	7–6^{(7–1)}, 6–2, 4–6, 6–4	(Canada) Sébastien Lareau (United States) Alex O'Brien	(Netherlands) Paul Haarhuis (United States) Jared Palmer	6–1, 6–3

=== 2000 ===
Masters	Singles champions	Runners-up	Score	Doubles champions	Runners-up	Score
Indian Wells Singles – Doubles	(Spain) Àlex Corretja	(Sweden) Thomas Enqvist	6–4, 6–4, 6–3	(United States) Alex O'Brien	(Netherlands) Paul Haarhuis (Australia) Sandon Stolle	6–4, 7–6
Indian Wells Singles – Doubles	(Spain) Àlex Corretja	(Sweden) Thomas Enqvist	6–4, 6–4, 6–3	(United States) Jared Palmer*	(Netherlands) Paul Haarhuis (Australia) Sandon Stolle	6–4, 7–6
Miami Singles – Doubles	(United States) Pete Sampras	(Brazil) Gustavo Kuerten	6–1, 6–7^{(2–7)}, 7–6^{(7–5)}, 7–6^{(10–8)}	(Australia) Todd Woodbridge (Australia) Mark Woodforde	(Czech Republic) Martin Damm (Slovakia) Dominik Hrbatý	6–3, 6–4
Monte Carlo Singles – Doubles	(France) Cédric Pioline*	(Slovakia) Dominik Hrbatý	6–3, 7–6^{(7–3)}, 7–6^{(8–6)}	(South Africa) Wayne Ferreira (Russia) Yevgeny Kafelnikov	(Netherlands) Paul Haarhuis (Australia) Sandon Stolle	6–3, 2–6, 6–1
Rome Singles – Doubles	(Sweden) Magnus Norman*	(Brazil) Gustavo Kuerten	6–3, 4–6, 6–4, 6–4	(Czech Republic) Martin Damm	(South Africa) Wayne Ferreira (Russia) Yevgeny Kafelnikov	6–4, 4–6, 6–3
Rome Singles – Doubles	(Sweden) Magnus Norman*	(Brazil) Gustavo Kuerten	6–3, 4–6, 6–4, 6–4	(Slovakia) Dominik Hrbatý*	(South Africa) Wayne Ferreira (Russia) Yevgeny Kafelnikov	6–4, 4–6, 6–3
Hamburg Singles – Doubles	(Brazil) Gustavo Kuerten	(Russia) Marat Safin	6–4, 5–7, 6–4, 5–7, 7–6^{(7–3)}	(Australia) Todd Woodbridge (Australia) Mark Woodforde	(Australia) Wayne Arthurs (Australia) Sandon Stolle	6–7, 6–4, 6–3
Toronto Singles – Doubles	(Russia) Marat Safin*	(Israel) Harel Levy	6–2, 6–3	(Canada) Sébastien Lareau (Canada) Daniel Nestor	(Australia) Joshua Eagle (Australia) Andrew Florent	6–3, 7–6
Cincinnati Singles – Doubles	(Sweden) Thomas Enqvist	(United Kingdom) Tim Henman	7–6^{(7–5)}, 6–4	(Australia) Todd Woodbridge (Australia) Mark Woodforde	(South Africa) Ellis Ferreira (United States) Rick Leach	7–6, 6–4
Stuttgart Singles – Doubles	(South Africa) Wayne Ferreira	(Australia) Lleyton Hewitt	7–6^{(8–6)},3–6, 6–7^{(5–7)}, 7–6^{(7–2)}, 6–2	(Czech Republic) Jiří Novák*	(United States) Donald Johnson (South Africa) Piet Norval	6–2, 6–2
Stuttgart Singles – Doubles	(South Africa) Wayne Ferreira	(Australia) Lleyton Hewitt	7–6^{(8–6)},3–6, 6–7^{(5–7)}, 7–6^{(7–2)}, 6–2	(Czech Republic) David Rikl	(United States) Donald Johnson (South Africa) Piet Norval	6–2, 6–2
Paris Singles – Doubles	(Russia) Marat Safin	(Australia) Mark Philippoussis	3–6, 7–6^{(9–7)}, 6–4, 3–6, 7–6^{(10–8)}	(Sweden) Nicklas Kulti	(Netherlands) Paul Haarhuis (Canada) Daniel Nestor	7–6^{(8–6)}, 7–5
Paris Singles – Doubles	(Russia) Marat Safin	(Australia) Mark Philippoussis	3–6, 7–6^{(9–7)}, 6–4, 3–6, 7–6^{(10–8)}	(Belarus) Max Mirnyi*	(Netherlands) Paul Haarhuis (Canada) Daniel Nestor	7–6^{(8–6)}, 7–5

=== 2001 ===
Masters	Singles champions	Runners-up	Score	Doubles champions	Runners-up	Score
Indian Wells Singles – Doubles	(United States) Andre Agassi	(United States) Pete Sampras	7–6^{(7–5)}, 7–5, 6–1	(South Africa) Wayne Ferreira (Russia) Yevgeny Kafelnikov	(Sweden) Jonas Björkman (Australia) Todd Woodbridge	6–2, 7–5
Miami Singles – Doubles	(United States) Andre Agassi	(United States) Jan-Michael Gambill	7–6^{(7–4)}, 6–1, 6–0	(Czech Republic) Jiří Novák (Czech Republic) David Rikl	(Sweden) Jonas Björkman (Australia) Todd Woodbridge	7–5, 7–6
Monte Carlo Singles – Doubles	(Brazil) Gustavo Kuerten	(Morocco) Hicham Arazi	6–3, 6–2, 6–4	(Sweden) Jonas Björkman (Australia) Todd Woodbridge	(Australia) Joshua Eagle (Australia) Andrew Florent	3–6, 6–4, 6–2
Rome Singles – Doubles	(Spain) Juan Carlos Ferrero*	(Brazil) Gustavo Kuerten	3–6, 6–1, 2–6, 6–4, 6–2	(South Africa) Wayne Ferreira (Russia) Yevgeny Kafelnikov	(Canada) Daniel Nestor (Australia) Sandon Stolle	6–4, 7–6
Hamburg Singles – Doubles	(Spain) Albert Portas*	(Spain) Juan Carlos Ferrero	4–6, 6–2, 0–6, 7–6^{(7–5)}, 7–5	(Sweden) Jonas Björkman (Australia) Todd Woodbridge	(Canada) Daniel Nestor (Australia) Sandon Stolle	7–6, 3–6, 6–3
Montreal Singles – Doubles	(Romania) Andrei Pavel*	(Australia) Patrick Rafter	7–6^{(7–3)}, 2–6, 6–3	(Czech Republic) Jiří Novák (Czech Republic) David Rikl	(United States) Donald Johnson (United States) Jared Palmer	6–4, 3–6, 6–3
Cincinnati Singles – Doubles	(Brazil) Gustavo Kuerten	(Australia) Patrick Rafter	6–1, 6–3	(India) Mahesh Bhupathi (India) Leander Paes	(Czech Republic) Martin Damm (Germany) David Prinosil	7–6, 6–3
Stuttgart Singles – Doubles	(Germany) Tommy Haas*	(Belarus) Max Mirnyi	6–2, 6–2, 6–2	(Belarus) Max Mirnyi (Australia) Sandon Stolle	(South Africa) Ellis Ferreira (United States) Jeff Tarango	7–6, 6–3
Paris Singles – Doubles	(France) Sébastien Grosjean*	(Russia) Yevgeny Kafelnikov	7–6^{(7–3)}, 6–1, 6–7^{(5–7)}, 6–4	(South Africa) Ellis Ferreira (United States) Rick Leach	(India) Mahesh Bhupathi (India) Leander Paes	5–7, 7–6^{(7–2)}, 6–4

=== 2002 ===
Masters	Singles champions	Runners-up	Score	Doubles champions	Runners-up	Score
Indian Wells Singles – Doubles	(Australia) Lleyton Hewitt*	(United Kingdom) Tim Henman	6–1, 6–2	(The Bahamas) Mark Knowles (Canada) Daniel Nestor	(Switzerland) Roger Federer (Belarus) Max Mirnyi	6–4, 6–4
Miami Singles – Doubles	(United States) Andre Agassi	(Switzerland) Roger Federer	6–3, 6–3, 3–6, 6–4	(The Bahamas) Mark Knowles (Canada) Daniel Nestor	(United States) Donald Johnson (United States) Jared Palmer	6–3, 3–6, 6–1
Monte Carlo Singles – Doubles	(Spain) Juan Carlos Ferrero	(Spain) Carlos Moyà	7–5, 6–3, 6–4	(Sweden) Jonas Björkman (Australia) Todd Woodbridge	(Netherlands) Paul Haarhuis (Russia) Yevgeny Kafelnikov	6–3, 3–6, [10–7]
Rome Singles – Doubles	(United States) Andre Agassi	(Germany) Tommy Haas	6–3, 6–3, 6–0	(Czech Republic) Martin Damm (Czech Republic) Cyril Suk	(Zimbabwe) Wayne Black (Zimbabwe) Kevin Ullyett	7–5, 7–5
Hamburg Singles – Doubles	(Switzerland) Roger Federer*	(Russia) Marat Safin	6–1, 6–3, 6–4	(India) Mahesh Bhupathi	(Sweden) Jonas Björkman (Australia) Todd Woodbridge	6–2, 6–4
Hamburg Singles – Doubles	(Switzerland) Roger Federer*	(Russia) Marat Safin	6–1, 6–3, 6–4	(United States) Jan-Michael Gambill*	(Sweden) Jonas Björkman (Australia) Todd Woodbridge	6–2, 6–4
Toronto Singles – Doubles	(Argentina) Guillermo Cañas*	(United States) Andy Roddick	6–4, 7–5	(United States) Bob Bryan* (United States) Mike Bryan*	(The Bahamas) Mark Knowles (Canada) Daniel Nestor	4–6, 7–6^{(7–1)}, 6–3
Cincinnati Singles – Doubles	(Spain) Carlos Moyà	(Australia) Lleyton Hewitt	7–5, 7–6^{(7–5)}	(United States) James Blake* (United States) Todd Martin*	(India) Mahesh Bhupathi (Belarus) Max Mirnyi	7–5, 6–3
Madrid Singles – Doubles	(United States) Andre Agassi	(Czech Republic) Jiří Novák	W/O	(The Bahamas) Mark Knowles (Canada) Daniel Nestor	(India) Mahesh Bhupathi (Belarus) Max Mirnyi	6–3, 5–7, 6–0
Paris Singles – Doubles	(Russia) Marat Safin	(Australia) Lleyton Hewitt	7–6^{(7–4)}, 6–0, 6–4	(France) Nicolas Escudé* (France) Fabrice Santoro*	(Brazil) Gustavo Kuerten (France) Cédric Pioline	6–3, 6–3

=== 2003 ===
Masters	Singles champions	Runners-up	Score	Doubles champions	Runners-up	Score
Indian Wells Singles – Doubles	(Australia) Lleyton Hewitt	(Brazil) Gustavo Kuerten	6–1, 6–1	(South Africa) Wayne Ferreira (Russia) Yevgeny Kafelnikov	(United States) Bob Bryan (United States) Mike Bryan	6–1, 6–4
Miami Singles – Doubles	(United States) Andre Agassi	(Spain) Carlos Moyà	6–3, 6–3	(Switzerland) Roger Federer*	(India) Leander Paes (Czech Republic) David Rikl	7–5, 6–3
Miami Singles – Doubles	(United States) Andre Agassi	(Spain) Carlos Moyà	6–3, 6–3	(Belarus) Max Mirnyi	(India) Leander Paes (Czech Republic) David Rikl	7–5, 6–3
Monte Carlo Singles – Doubles	(Spain) Juan Carlos Ferrero	(Argentina) Guillermo Coria	6–2, 6–2	(India) Mahesh Bhupathi (Belarus) Max Mirnyi	(France) Michaël Llodra (France) Fabrice Santoro	4–6, 7–5, 6–2
Rome Singles – Doubles	(Spain) Félix Mantilla*	(Switzerland) Roger Federer	7–5, 6–2, 7–6^{(10–8)}	(Australia) Wayne Arthurs	(France) Michaël Llodra (France) Fabrice Santoro	7–5, 7–6
Rome Singles – Doubles	(Spain) Félix Mantilla*	(Switzerland) Roger Federer	7–5, 6–2, 7–6^{(10–8)}	(Australia) Paul Hanley*	(France) Michaël Llodra (France) Fabrice Santoro	7–5, 7–6
Hamburg Singles – Doubles	(Argentina) Guillermo Coria*	(Argentina) Agustín Calleri	6–3, 6–4, 6–4	(The Bahamas) Mark Knowles (Canada) Daniel Nestor	(India) Mahesh Bhupathi (Belarus) Max Mirnyi	6–4, 6–4
Montreal Singles – Doubles	(United States) Andy Roddick*	(Argentina) David Nalbandian	6–1, 6–3	(India) Mahesh Bhupathi (Belarus) Max Mirnyi	(Sweden) Jonas Björkman (Australia) Todd Woodbridge	6–3, 7–6^{(7–4)}
Cincinnati Singles – Doubles	(United States) Andy Roddick	(United States) Mardy Fish	4–6, 7–6^{(7–3)}, 7–6^{(7–4)}	(United States) Bob Bryan (United States) Mike Bryan	(Australia) Wayne Arthurs (Australia) Paul Hanley	7–6, 6–4
Madrid Singles – Doubles	(Spain) Juan Carlos Ferrero	(Chile) Nicolás Massú	6–3, 6–4, 6–3	(India) Mahesh Bhupathi (Belarus) Max Mirnyi	(Zimbabwe) Wayne Black (Zimbabwe) Kevin Ullyett	6–2, 2–6, 6–3
Paris Singles – Doubles	(United Kingdom) Tim Henman*	(Romania) Andrei Pavel	6–2, 7–6^{(8–6)}, 7–6^{(7–2)}	(Australia) Wayne Arthurs (Australia) Paul Hanley	(France) Michaël Llodra (France) Fabrice Santoro	6–3, 1–6, 6–3

=== 2004 ===
Masters	Singles champions	Runners-up	Score	Doubles champions	Runners-up	Score
Indian Wells Singles – Doubles	(Switzerland) Roger Federer	(United Kingdom) Tim Henman	6–3, 6–3	(France) Arnaud Clément* (France) Sébastien Grosjean*	(Zimbabwe) Wayne Black (Zimbabwe) Kevin Ullyett	6–3, 4–6, 7–5
Miami Singles – Doubles	(United States) Andy Roddick	(Argentina) Guillermo Coria	6–7^{(2–7)}, 6–3, 6–1 ret.	(Zimbabwe) Wayne Black	(Sweden) Jonas Björkman (Australia) Todd Woodbridge	6–2, 7–6
Miami Singles – Doubles	(United States) Andy Roddick	(Argentina) Guillermo Coria	6–7^{(2–7)}, 6–3, 6–1 ret.	(Zimbabwe) Kevin Ullyett*	(Sweden) Jonas Björkman (Australia) Todd Woodbridge	6–2, 7–6
Monte Carlo Singles – Doubles	(Argentina) Guillermo Coria	(Germany) Rainer Schüttler	6–2, 6–1, 6–3	(United Kingdom) Tim Henman	(Argentina) Gastón Etlis (Argentina) Martín Rodríguez	7–5, 6–4
Monte Carlo Singles – Doubles	(Argentina) Guillermo Coria	(Germany) Rainer Schüttler	6–2, 6–1, 6–3	(Serbia and Montenegro) Nenad Zimonjić*	(Argentina) Gastón Etlis (Argentina) Martín Rodríguez	7–5, 6–4
Rome Singles – Doubles	(Spain) Carlos Moyà	(Argentina) David Nalbandian	6–3, 6–3, 6–1	(India) Mahesh Bhupathi (Belarus) Max Mirnyi	(Australia) Wayne Arthurs (Australia) Paul Hanley	1–6, 6–4, 7–6
Hamburg Singles – Doubles	(Switzerland) Roger Federer	(Argentina) Guillermo Coria	4–6, 6–4, 6–2, 6–3	(Zimbabwe) Wayne Black (Zimbabwe) Kevin Ullyett	(United States) Bob Bryan (United States) Mike Bryan	6–1, 6–2
Toronto Singles – Doubles	(Switzerland) Roger Federer	(United States) Andy Roddick	7–5, 6–3	(India) Mahesh Bhupathi (India) Leander Paes	(Sweden) Jonas Björkman (Belarus) Max Mirnyi	6–4, 6–2
Cincinnati Singles – Doubles	(United States) Andre Agassi	(Australia) Lleyton Hewitt	6–3, 3–6, 6–2	(The Bahamas) Mark Knowles (Canada) Daniel Nestor	(Sweden) Jonas Björkman (Australia) Todd Woodbridge	7–6, 6–3
Madrid Singles – Doubles	(Russia) Marat Safin	(Argentina) David Nalbandian	6–2, 6–4, 6–3	(The Bahamas) Mark Knowles (Canada) Daniel Nestor	(United States) Bob Bryan (United States) Mike Bryan	6–3, 6–4
Paris Singles – Doubles	(Russia) Marat Safin	(Czech Republic) Radek Štěpánek	6–3, 7–6^{(7–5)}, 6–3	(Sweden) Jonas Björkman (Australia) Todd Woodbridge	(Zimbabwe) Wayne Black (Zimbabwe) Kevin Ullyett	6–3, 6–4

=== 2005 ===
Masters	Singles champions	Runners-up	Score	Doubles champions	Runners-up	Score
Indian Wells Singles – Doubles	(Switzerland) Roger Federer	(Australia) Lleyton Hewitt	6–2, 6–4, 6–4	(The Bahamas) Mark Knowles (Canada) Daniel Nestor	(Australia) Wayne Arthurs (Australia) Paul Hanley	7–6, 7–6
Miami Singles – Doubles	(Switzerland) Roger Federer	(Spain) Rafael Nadal	2–6, 6–7^{(4–7)}, 7–6^{(7–5)}, 6–3, 6–1	(Sweden) Jonas Björkman (Belarus) Max Mirnyi	(Zimbabwe) Wayne Black (Zimbabwe) Kevin Ullyett	6–1, 6–2
Monte Carlo Singles – Doubles	(Spain) Rafael Nadal*	(Argentina) Guillermo Coria	6–3, 6–1, 0–6, 7–5	(India) Leander Paes (Serbia and Montenegro) Nenad Zimonjić	(United States) Bob Bryan (United States) Mike Bryan	W/O
Rome Singles – Doubles	(Spain) Rafael Nadal	(Argentina) Guillermo Coria	6–4, 3–6, 6–3, 4–6, 7–6^{(8–6)}	(France) Michaël Llodra*	(United States) Bob Bryan (United States) Mike Bryan	7–5, 6–4
Rome Singles – Doubles	(Spain) Rafael Nadal	(Argentina) Guillermo Coria	6–4, 3–6, 6–3, 4–6, 7–6^{(8–6)}	(France) Fabrice Santoro	(United States) Bob Bryan (United States) Mike Bryan	7–5, 6–4
Hamburg Singles – Doubles	(Switzerland) Roger Federer	(France) Richard Gasquet	6–3, 7–5, 7–6^{(7–4)}	(Sweden) Jonas Björkman (Belarus) Max Mirnyi	(France) Michaël Llodra (France) Fabrice Santoro	6–2, 6–3
Montreal Singles – Doubles	(Spain) Rafael Nadal	(United States) Andre Agassi	6–3, 4–6, 6–2	(Zimbabwe) Wayne Black (Zimbabwe) Kevin Ullyett	(Israel) Jonathan Erlich (Israel) Andy Ram	6–7^{(5–7)}, 6–3, 6–0
Cincinnati Singles – Doubles	(Switzerland) Roger Federer	(United States) Andy Roddick	6–3, 7–5	(Sweden) Jonas Björkman (Belarus) Max Mirnyi	(Zimbabwe) Wayne Black (Zimbabwe) Kevin Ullyett	6–4, 5–7, 6–2
Madrid Singles – Doubles	(Spain) Rafael Nadal	(Croatia) Ivan Ljubičić	3–6, 2–6, 6–3, 6–4, 7–6^{(7–3)}	(The Bahamas) Mark Knowles (Canada) Daniel Nestor	(India) Leander Paes (Serbia and Montenegro) Nenad Zimonjić	3–6, 6–3, 6–2
Paris Singles – Doubles	(Czech Republic) Tomáš Berdych*	(Croatia) Ivan Ljubičić	6–3, 6–4, 3–6, 4–6, 6–4	(United States) Bob Bryan (United States) Mike Bryan	(The Bahamas) Mark Knowles (Canada) Daniel Nestor	6–4, 6–7^{(3–7)}, 6–4

=== 2006 ===
Masters	Singles champions	Runners-up	Score	Doubles champions	Runners-up	Score
Indian Wells Singles – Doubles	(Switzerland) Roger Federer	(United States) James Blake	7–5, 6–3, 6–0	(The Bahamas) Mark Knowles (Canada) Daniel Nestor	(United States) Bob Bryan (United States) Mike Bryan	6–4, 6–4
Miami Singles – Doubles	(Switzerland) Roger Federer	(Croatia) Ivan Ljubičić	7–6^{(7–5)}, 7–6^{(7–4)}, 7–6^{(8–6)}	(Sweden) Jonas Björkman (Belarus) Max Mirnyi	(United States) Bob Bryan (United States) Mike Bryan	6–4, 6–4
Monte Carlo Singles – Doubles	(Spain) Rafael Nadal	(Switzerland) Roger Federer	6–2, 6–7^{(2–7)}, 6–3, 7–6^{(7–5)}	(Sweden) Jonas Björkman (Belarus) Max Mirnyi	(France) Fabrice Santoro (Serbia and Montenegro) Nenad Zimonjić	6–2, 7–6^{(7–2)}
Rome Singles – Doubles	(Spain) Rafael Nadal	(Switzerland) Roger Federer	6–7^{(0–7)}, 7–6^{(7–5)}, 6–4, 2–6, 7–6^{(7–5)}	(The Bahamas) Mark Knowles (Canada) Daniel Nestor	(Israel) Jonathan Erlich (Israel) Andy Ram	6–4, 5–7, [13–11]
Hamburg Singles – Doubles	(Spain) Tommy Robredo*	(Czech Republic) Radek Štěpánek	6–1, 6–3, 6–3	(Australia) Paul Hanley (Zimbabwe) Kevin Ullyett	(The Bahamas) Mark Knowles (Canada) Daniel Nestor	6–2, 7–6^{(10–8)}
Toronto Singles – Doubles	(Switzerland) Roger Federer	(France) Richard Gasquet	2–6, 6–3, 6–2	(United States) Bob Bryan (United States) Mike Bryan	(Australia) Paul Hanley (Zimbabwe) Kevin Ullyett	6–3, 7–5
Cincinnati Singles – Doubles	(United States) Andy Roddick	(Spain) Juan Carlos Ferrero	6–3, 6–4	(Sweden) Jonas Björkman (Belarus) Max Mirnyi	(United States) Bob Bryan (United States) Mike Bryan	7–6, 6–4
Madrid Singles – Doubles	(Switzerland) Roger Federer	(Chile) Fernando González	7–5, 6–1, 6–0	(United States) Bob Bryan (United States) Mike Bryan	(The Bahamas) Mark Knowles (Canada) Daniel Nestor	7–5, 6–4
Paris Singles – Doubles	(Russia) Nikolay Davydenko*	(Slovakia) Dominik Hrbatý	6–1, 6–2, 6–2	(France) Arnaud Clément (France) Michaël Llodra	(France) Fabrice Santoro (Serbia) Nenad Zimonjić	7–6^{(7–4)}, 6–2

=== 2007 ===
Masters	Singles champions	Runners-up	Score	Doubles champions	Runners-up	Score
Indian Wells Singles – Doubles	(Spain) Rafael Nadal	(Serbia) Novak Djokovic	6–2, 7–5	(Czech Republic) Martin Damm (India) Leander Paes	(Israel) Jonathan Erlich (Israel) Andy Ram	6–4, 6–4
Miami Singles – Doubles	(Serbia) Novak Djokovic*	(Argentina) Guillermo Cañas	6–3, 6–2, 6–4	(United States) Bob Bryan (United States) Mike Bryan	(Czech Republic) Martin Damm (India) Leander Paes	7–6^{(9–7)}, 3–6, [10–7]
Monte Carlo Singles – Doubles	(Spain) Rafael Nadal	(Switzerland) Roger Federer	6–4, 6–4	(United States) Bob Bryan (United States) Mike Bryan	(France) Julien Benneteau (France) Richard Gasquet	6–2, 6–1
Rome Singles – Doubles	(Spain) Rafael Nadal	(Chile) Fernando González	6–2, 6–2	(France) Fabrice Santoro (Serbia) Nenad Zimonjić	(United States) Bob Bryan (United States) Mike Bryan	6–4, 6–7^{(4–7)}, [10–7]
Hamburg Singles – Doubles	(Switzerland) Roger Federer	(Spain) Rafael Nadal	2–6, 6–2, 6–0	(United States) Bob Bryan (United States) Mike Bryan	(Australia) Paul Hanley (Zimbabwe) Kevin Ullyett	6–3, 6–4
Montreal Singles – Doubles	(Serbia) Novak Djokovic	(Switzerland) Roger Federer	7–6^{(7–2)}, 2–6, 7–6^{(7–2)}	(India) Mahesh Bhupathi	(Australia) Paul Hanley (Zimbabwe) Kevin Ullyett	6–4, 6–4
Montreal Singles – Doubles	(Serbia) Novak Djokovic	(Switzerland) Roger Federer	7–6^{(7–2)}, 2–6, 7–6^{(7–2)}	(Czech Republic) Pavel Vízner*	(Australia) Paul Hanley (Zimbabwe) Kevin Ullyett	6–4, 6–4
Cincinnati Singles – Doubles	(Switzerland) Roger Federer	(United States) James Blake	6–1, 6–4	(Israel) Jonathan Erlich* (Israel) Andy Ram*	(United States) Bob Bryan (United States) Mike Bryan	6–4, 3–6, [13–11]
Madrid Singles – Doubles	(Argentina) David Nalbandian*	(Switzerland) Roger Federer	1–6, 6–3, 6–3	(United States) Bob Bryan (United States) Mike Bryan	(Poland) Mariusz Fyrstenberg (Poland) Marcin Matkowski	6–3, 7–6^{(7–4)}
Paris Singles – Doubles	(Argentina) David Nalbandian	(Spain) Rafael Nadal	6–4, 6–0	(United States) Bob Bryan (United States) Mike Bryan	(Canada) Daniel Nestor (Serbia) Nenad Zimonjić	6–3, 7–6^{(7–4)}

=== 2008 ===
Masters	Singles champions	Runners-up	Score	Doubles champions	Runners-up	Score
Indian Wells Singles – Doubles	(Serbia) Novak Djokovic	(United States) Mardy Fish	6–2, 5–7, 6–3	(Israel) Jonathan Erlich (Israel) Andy Ram	(Canada) Daniel Nestor (Serbia) Nenad Zimonjić	6–4, 6–4
Miami Singles – Doubles	(Russia) Nikolay Davydenko	(Spain) Rafael Nadal	6–4, 6–2	(United States) Bob Bryan (United States) Mike Bryan	(India) Mahesh Bhupathi (The Bahamas) Mark Knowles	6–2, 6–2
Monte Carlo Singles – Doubles	(Spain) Rafael Nadal	(Switzerland) Roger Federer	7–5, 7–5	(Spain) Rafael Nadal* (Spain) Tommy Robredo*	(India) Mahesh Bhupathi (The Bahamas) Mark Knowles	6–3, 6–3
Rome Singles – Doubles	(Serbia) Novak Djokovic	(Switzerland) Stan Wawrinka	4–6, 6–3, 6–3	(United States) Bob Bryan (United States) Mike Bryan	(Canada) Daniel Nestor (Serbia) Nenad Zimonjić	3–6, 6–4, [10–8]
Hamburg Singles – Doubles	(Spain) Rafael Nadal	(Switzerland) Roger Federer	7–5, 6–7^{(3–7)}, 6–3	(Canada) Daniel Nestor (Serbia) Nenad Zimonjić	(United States) Bob Bryan (United States) Mike Bryan	4–6, 7–5, [10–8]
Toronto Singles – Doubles	(Spain) Rafael Nadal	(Germany) Nicolas Kiefer	6–3, 6–2	(Canada) Daniel Nestor (Serbia) Nenad Zimonjić	(United States) Bob Bryan (United States) Mike Bryan	6–2, 4–6, [10–8]
Cincinnati Singles – Doubles	(United Kingdom) Andy Murray*	(Serbia) Novak Djokovic	7–6^{(7–4)}, 7–6^{(7–5)}	(United States) Bob Bryan (United States) Mike Bryan	(Israel) Jonathan Erlich (Israel) Andy Ram	4–6, 7–6^{(7–2)}, [10–7]
Madrid Singles – Doubles	(United Kingdom) Andy Murray	(France) Gilles Simon	6–4, 7–6^{(8–6)}	(Poland) Mariusz Fyrstenberg* (Poland) Marcin Matkowski*	(India) Mahesh Bhupathi (The Bahamas) Mark Knowles	6–4, 6–2
Paris Singles – Doubles	(France) Jo-Wilfried Tsonga*	(Argentina) David Nalbandian	6–3, 4–6, 6–4	(Sweden) Jonas Björkman (Zimbabwe) Kevin Ullyett	(South Africa) Jeff Coetzee (South Africa) Wesley Moodie	6–2, 6–2

=== 2009 ===
Masters	Singles champions	Runners-up	Score	Doubles champions	Runners-up	Score
Indian Wells Singles – Doubles	(Spain) Rafael Nadal	(United Kingdom) Andy Murray	6–1, 6–2	(United States) Mardy Fish* (United States) Andy Roddick*	(Belarus) Max Mirnyi (Israel) Andy Ram	3–6, 6–1, [14–12]
Miami Singles – Doubles	(United Kingdom) Andy Murray	(Serbia) Novak Djokovic	6–2, 7–5	(Belarus) Max Mirnyi (Israel) Andy Ram	(Australia) Ashley Fisher (Australia) Stephen Huss	6–7^{(4–7)}, 6–2, [10–7]
Monte Carlo Singles – Doubles	(Spain) Rafael Nadal	(Serbia) Novak Djokovic	6–3, 2–6, 6–1	(Canada) Daniel Nestor (Serbia) Nenad Zimonjić	(United States) Bob Bryan (United States) Mike Bryan	6–4, 6–1
Rome Singles – Doubles	(Spain) Rafael Nadal	(Serbia) Novak Djokovic	7–6^{(7–2)}, 6–2	(Canada) Daniel Nestor (Serbia) Nenad Zimonjić	(United States) Bob Bryan (United States) Mike Bryan	7–6^{(7–5)}, 6–3
Madrid Singles – Doubles	(Switzerland) Roger Federer	(Spain) Rafael Nadal	6–4, 6–4	(Canada) Daniel Nestor (Serbia) Nenad Zimonjić	(Sweden) Simon Aspelin (South Africa) Wesley Moodie	6–4, 6–4
Montreal Singles – Doubles	(United Kingdom) Andy Murray	(Argentina) Juan Martín del Potro	6–7^{(4–7)}, 7–6^{(7–3)}, 6–1	(India) Mahesh Bhupathi (The Bahamas) Mark Knowles	(Belarus) Max Mirnyi (Israel) Andy Ram	6–4, 6–3
Cincinnati Singles – Doubles	(Switzerland) Roger Federer	(Serbia) Novak Djokovic	6–1, 7–5	(Canada) Daniel Nestor (Serbia) Nenad Zimonjić	(United States) Bob Bryan (United States) Mike Bryan	3–6, 7–6^{(7–2)}, [15–13]
Shanghai Singles – Doubles	(Russia) Nikolay Davydenko	(Spain) Rafael Nadal	7–6^{(7–3)}, 6–3	(France) Jo-Wilfried Tsonga* (France) Julien Benneteau*	(Poland) Mariusz Fyrstenberg (Poland) Marcin Matkowski	6–2, 6–4
Paris Singles – Doubles	(Serbia) Novak Djokovic	(France) Gaël Monfils	6–2, 5–7, 7–6^{(7–3)}	(Canada) Daniel Nestor (Serbia) Nenad Zimonjić	(Spain) Marcel Granollers (Spain) Tommy Robredo	6–3, 6–4

=== 2010 ===
Masters	Singles champions	Runners-up	Score	Doubles champions	Runners-up	Score
Indian Wells Singles – Doubles	(Croatia) Ivan Ljubičić*	(United States) Andy Roddick	7–6^{(7–3)}, 7–6^{(7–5)}	(Spain) Marc López*	(Canada) Daniel Nestor (Serbia) Nenad Zimonjić	7–6^{(10–8)}, 6–3
Indian Wells Singles – Doubles	(Croatia) Ivan Ljubičić*	(United States) Andy Roddick	7–6^{(7–3)}, 7–6^{(7–5)}	(Spain) Rafael Nadal	(Canada) Daniel Nestor (Serbia) Nenad Zimonjić	7–6^{(10–8)}, 6–3
Miami Singles – Doubles	(United States) Andy Roddick	(Czech Republic) Tomáš Berdych	7–5, 6–4	(Czech Republic) Lukáš Dlouhý*	(India) Mahesh Bhupathi (Belarus) Max Mirnyi	6–2, 7–5
Miami Singles – Doubles	(United States) Andy Roddick	(Czech Republic) Tomáš Berdych	7–5, 6–4	(India) Leander Paes	(India) Mahesh Bhupathi (Belarus) Max Mirnyi	6–2, 7–5
Monte Carlo Singles – Doubles	(Spain) Rafael Nadal	(Spain) Fernando Verdasco	6–0, 6–1	(Canada) Daniel Nestor (Serbia) Nenad Zimonjić	(India) Mahesh Bhupathi (Belarus) Max Mirnyi	6–3, 2–0 ret.
Rome Singles – Doubles	(Spain) Rafael Nadal	(Spain) David Ferrer	7–5, 6–2	(United States) Bob Bryan (United States) Mike Bryan	(United States) John Isner (United States) Sam Querrey	6–2, 6–3
Madrid Singles – Doubles	(Spain) Rafael Nadal	(Switzerland) Roger Federer	6–4, 7–6^{(7–5)}	(United States) Bob Bryan (United States) Mike Bryan	(Canada) Daniel Nestor (Serbia) Nenad Zimonjić	6–3, 6–4
Toronto Singles – Doubles	(United Kingdom) Andy Murray	(Switzerland) Roger Federer	7–5, 7–5	(United States) Bob Bryan (United States) Mike Bryan	(France) Julien Benneteau (France) Michaël Llodra	7–5, 6–3
Cincinnati Singles – Doubles	(Switzerland) Roger Federer	(United States) Mardy Fish	6–7^{(5–7)}, 7–6^{(7–1)}, 6–4	(United States) Bob Bryan (United States) Mike Bryan	(India) Mahesh Bhupathi (Belarus) Max Mirnyi	6–3, 6–4.
Shanghai Singles – Doubles	(United Kingdom) Andy Murray	(Switzerland) Roger Federer	6–3, 6–2	(Austria) Jürgen Melzer*	(Poland) Mariusz Fyrstenberg (Poland) Marcin Matkowski	7–5, 4–6, [10–5]
Shanghai Singles – Doubles	(United Kingdom) Andy Murray	(Switzerland) Roger Federer	6–3, 6–2	(India) Leander Paes	(Poland) Mariusz Fyrstenberg (Poland) Marcin Matkowski	7–5, 4–6, [10–5]
Paris Singles – Doubles	(Sweden) Robin Söderling*	(France) Gaël Monfils	6–1, 7–6^{(7–1)}	(India) Mahesh Bhupathi (Belarus) Max Mirnyi	(The Bahamas) Mark Knowles (Israel) Andy Ram	7–5, 7–5

=== 2011 ===
Masters	Singles champions	Runners-up	Score	Doubles champions	Runners-up	Score
Indian Wells Singles – Doubles	(Serbia) Novak Djokovic	(Spain) Rafael Nadal	4–6, 6–3, 6–2	(Ukraine) Alexandr Dolgopolov* (Belgium) Xavier Malisse*	(Switzerland) Roger Federer (Switzerland) Stan Wawrinka	6–4, 6–7^{(5–7)}, [10–7]
Miami Singles – Doubles	(Serbia) Novak Djokovic	(Spain) Rafael Nadal	4–6, 6–3, 7–6^{(7–4)}	(India) Mahesh Bhupathi (India) Leander Paes	(Belarus) Max Mirnyi (Canada) Daniel Nestor	6–7^{(5–7)}, 6–2, [10–5]
Monte Carlo Singles – Doubles	(Spain) Rafael Nadal	(Spain) David Ferrer	6–4, 7–5	(United States) Bob Bryan (United States) Mike Bryan	(Argentina) Juan Ignacio Chela (Brazil) Bruno Soares	6–3, 6–2
Madrid Singles – Doubles	(Serbia) Novak Djokovic	(Spain) Rafael Nadal	7–5, 6–4	(United States) Bob Bryan (United States) Mike Bryan	(France) Michaël Llodra (Serbia) Nenad Zimonjić	6–3, 6–3
Rome Singles – Doubles	(Serbia) Novak Djokovic	(Spain) Rafael Nadal	6–4, 6–4	(United States) John Isner* (United States) Sam Querrey*	(United States) Mardy Fish (United States) Andy Roddick	W/O
Montreal Singles – Doubles	(Serbia) Novak Djokovic	(United States) Mardy Fish	6–2, 3–6, 6–4	(France) Michaël Llodra (Serbia) Nenad Zimonjić	(United States) Bob Bryan (United States) Mike Bryan	6–4, 6–7^{(5–7)}, [10–5]
Cincinnati Singles – Doubles	(United Kingdom) Andy Murray	(Serbia) Novak Djokovic	6–4, 3–0 ret.	(India) Mahesh Bhupathi (India) Leander Paes	(France) Michaël Llodra (Serbia) Nenad Zimonjić	7–6^{(7–4)}, 7–6^{(7–2)}
Shanghai Singles – Doubles	(United Kingdom) Andy Murray	(Spain) David Ferrer	7–5, 6–4	(Belarus) Max Mirnyi	(France) Michaël Llodra (Serbia) Nenad Zimonjić	3–6, 6–1, [12–10]
Shanghai Singles – Doubles	(United Kingdom) Andy Murray	(Spain) David Ferrer	7–5, 6–4	(Canada) Daniel Nestor^{§}	(France) Michaël Llodra (Serbia) Nenad Zimonjić	3–6, 6–1, [12–10]
Paris Singles – Doubles	(Switzerland) Roger Federer	(France) Jo-Wilfried Tsonga	6–1, 7–6^{(7–3)}	(India) Rohan Bopanna* (Pakistan) Aisam-ul-Haq Qureshi*	(France) Julien Benneteau (France) Nicolas Mahut	6–2, 6–4

=== 2012 ===
Masters	Singles champions	Runners-up	Score	Doubles champions	Runners-up	Score
Indian Wells Singles – Doubles	(Switzerland) Roger Federer	(United States) John Isner	7–6^{(9–7)}, 6–3	(Spain) Marc López (Spain) Rafael Nadal	(United States) John Isner (United States) Sam Querrey	6–2, 7–6^{(7–3)}
Miami Singles – Doubles	(Serbia) Novak Djokovic	(United Kingdom) Andy Murray	6–1, 7–6^{(7–4)}	(India) Leander Paes	(Belarus) Max Mirnyi (Canada) Daniel Nestor	3–6, 6–1, [10–8]
Miami Singles – Doubles	(Serbia) Novak Djokovic	(United Kingdom) Andy Murray	6–1, 7–6^{(7–4)}	(Czech Republic) Radek Štěpánek*	(Belarus) Max Mirnyi (Canada) Daniel Nestor	3–6, 6–1, [10–8]
Monte Carlo Singles – Doubles	(Spain) Rafael Nadal	(Serbia) Novak Djokovic	6–3, 6–1	(United States) Bob Bryan (United States) Mike Bryan	(Belarus) Max Mirnyi (Canada) Daniel Nestor	6–2, 6–3
Madrid Singles – Doubles	(Switzerland) Roger Federer	(Czech Republic) Tomáš Berdych	3–6, 7–5, 7–5	(Poland) Mariusz Fyrstenberg (Poland) Marcin Matkowski	(Sweden) Robert Lindstedt (Romania) Horia Tecău	6–3, 6–4
Rome Singles – Doubles	(Spain) Rafael Nadal	(Serbia) Novak Djokovic	7–5, 6–3	(Spain) Marcel Granollers*	(Poland) Łukasz Kubot (Serbia) Janko Tipsarević	6–3, 6–2
Rome Singles – Doubles	(Spain) Rafael Nadal	(Serbia) Novak Djokovic	7–5, 6–3	(Spain) Marc López	(Poland) Łukasz Kubot (Serbia) Janko Tipsarević	6–3, 6–2
Toronto Singles – Doubles	(Serbia) Novak Djokovic	(France) Richard Gasquet	6–3, 6–2	(United States) Bob Bryan (United States) Mike Bryan	(Spain) Marcel Granollers (Spain) Marc López	6–1, 4–6, [12–10]
Cincinnati Singles – Doubles	(Switzerland) Roger Federer	(Serbia) Novak Djokovic	6–0, 7–6^{(9–7)}	(Sweden) Robert Lindstedt* (Romania) Horia Tecău*	(India) Mahesh Bhupathi (India) Rohan Bopanna	6–4, 6–4
Shanghai Singles – Doubles	(Serbia) Novak Djokovic	(United Kingdom) Andy Murray	5–7, 7–6^{(13–11)}, 6–3	(India) Leander Paes (Czech Republic) Radek Štěpánek	(India) Mahesh Bhupathi (India) Rohan Bopanna	6–7^{(7–9)}, 6–3, [10–5]
Paris Singles – Doubles	(Spain) David Ferrer*	(Poland) Jerzy Janowicz	6–4, 6–3	(India) Mahesh Bhupathi (India) Rohan Bopanna	(Pakistan) Aisam-ul-Haq Qureshi (Netherlands) Jean-Julien Rojer	7–6^{(8–6)}, 6–3

=== 2013 ===
Masters	Singles champions	Runners-up	Score	Doubles champions	Runners-up	Score
Indian Wells Singles – Doubles	(Spain) Rafael Nadal	(Argentina) Juan Martín del Potro	4–6, 6–3, 6–4	(United States) Bob Bryan (United States) Mike Bryan	(Philippines) Treat Huey (Poland) Jerzy Janowicz	6–3, 3–6, [10–6]
Miami Singles – Doubles	(United Kingdom) Andy Murray	(Spain) David Ferrer	2–6, 6–4, 7–6^{(7–1)}	(Pakistan) Aisam-ul-Haq Qureshi	(Poland) Mariusz Fyrstenberg (Poland) Marcin Matkowski	6–4, 6–1
Miami Singles – Doubles	(United Kingdom) Andy Murray	(Spain) David Ferrer	2–6, 6–4, 7–6^{(7–1)}	(Netherlands) Jean-Julien Rojer*	(Poland) Mariusz Fyrstenberg (Poland) Marcin Matkowski	6–4, 6–1
Monte Carlo Singles – Doubles	(Serbia) Novak Djokovic	(Spain) Rafael Nadal	6–2, 7–6^{(7–1)}	(France) Julien Benneteau (Serbia) Nenad Zimonjić	(United States) Bob Bryan (United States) Mike Bryan	4–6, 7–6^{(7–4)}, [14–12]
Madrid Singles – Doubles	(Spain) Rafael Nadal	(Switzerland) Stan Wawrinka	6–2, 6–4	(United States) Bob Bryan (United States) Mike Bryan	(Austria) Alexander Peya (Brazil) Bruno Soares	6–2, 6–3
Rome Singles – Doubles	(Spain) Rafael Nadal	(Switzerland) Roger Federer	6–1, 6–3	(United States) Bob Bryan (United States) Mike Bryan	(India) Mahesh Bhupathi (India) Rohan Bopanna	6–2, 6–3
Montreal Singles – Doubles	(Spain) Rafael Nadal	(Canada) Milos Raonic	6–2, 6–2	(Austria) Alexander Peya* (Brazil) Bruno Soares*	(United Kingdom) Colin Fleming (United Kingdom) Andy Murray	6–4, 7–6^{(7–4)}
Cincinnati Singles – Doubles	(Spain) Rafael Nadal	(United States) John Isner	7–6^{(10–8)}, 7–6^{(7–3)}	(United States) Bob Bryan (United States) Mike Bryan	(Spain) Marcel Granollers (Spain) Marc López	6–4, 4–6, [10–4]
Shanghai Singles – Doubles	(Serbia) Novak Djokovic	(Argentina) Juan Martín del Potro	6–1, 3–6, 7–6^{(7–3)}	(Croatia) Ivan Dodig* (Brazil) Marcelo Melo*	(Spain) David Marrero (Spain) Fernando Verdasco	7–6^{(7–2)}, 6–7^{(6–8)}, [10–2]
Paris Singles – Doubles	(Serbia) Novak Djokovic	(Spain) David Ferrer	7–5, 7–5	(United States) Bob Bryan (United States) Mike Bryan	(Austria) Alexander Peya (Brazil) Bruno Soares	6–3, 6–3

=== 2014 ===
Masters	Singles champions	Runners-up	Score	Doubles champions	Runners-up	Score
Indian Wells Singles – Doubles	(Serbia) Novak Djokovic	(Switzerland) Roger Federer	3–6, 6–3, 7–6^{(7–3)}	(United States) Bob Bryan (United States) Mike Bryan	(Austria) Alexander Peya (Brazil) Bruno Soares	6–4, 6–3
Miami Singles – Doubles	(Serbia) Novak Djokovic	(Spain) Rafael Nadal	6–3, 6–3	(United States) Bob Bryan (United States) Mike Bryan	(Colombia) Juan Sebastián Cabal (Colombia) Robert Farah	7–6^{(10–8)}, 6–4
Monte Carlo Singles – Doubles	(Switzerland) Stan Wawrinka*	(Switzerland) Roger Federer	4–6, 7–6^{(7–5)}, 6–2	(United States) Bob Bryan (United States) Mike Bryan	(Croatia) Ivan Dodig (Brazil) Marcelo Melo	6–3, 3–6, [10–8]
Madrid Singles – Doubles	(Spain) Rafael Nadal	(Japan) Kei Nishikori	2–6, 6–4, 3–0 ret.	(Canada) Daniel Nestor (Serbia) Nenad Zimonjić	(United States) Bob Bryan (United States) Mike Bryan	6–4, 6–2
Rome Singles – Doubles	(Serbia) Novak Djokovic	(Spain) Rafael Nadal	4–6, 6–3, 6–3	(Canada) Daniel Nestor (Serbia) Nenad Zimonjić	(Netherlands) Robin Haase (Spain) Feliciano López	6–4, 7–6^{(7–2)}
Toronto Singles – Doubles	(France) Jo-Wilfried Tsonga	(Switzerland) Roger Federer	7–5, 7–6^{(7–3)}	(Austria) Alexander Peya (Brazil) Bruno Soares	(Croatia) Ivan Dodig (Brazil) Marcelo Melo	6–4, 6–3
Cincinnati Singles – Doubles	(Switzerland) Roger Federer	(Spain) David Ferrer	6–3, 1–6, 6–2	(United States) Bob Bryan (United States) Mike Bryan	(Canada) Vasek Pospisil (United States) Jack Sock	6–3, 6–2
Shanghai Singles – Doubles	(Switzerland) Roger Federer	(France) Gilles Simon	7–6^{(8–6)}, 7–6^{(7–2)}	(United States) Bob Bryan^{§} (United States) Mike Bryan^{§}	(France) Julien Benneteau (France) Edouard Roger-Vasselin	6–3, 7–6^{(7–3)}
Paris Singles – Doubles	(Serbia) Novak Djokovic	(Canada) Milos Raonic	6–2, 6–3	(United States) Bob Bryan (United States) Mike Bryan	(Poland) Marcin Matkowski (Austria) Jürgen Melzer	7–6^{(7–5)}, 5–7, [10–6]

=== 2015 ===
Masters	Singles champions	Runners-up	Score	Doubles champions	Runners-up	Score
Indian Wells Singles – Doubles	(Serbia) Novak Djokovic	(Switzerland) Roger Federer	6–3, 6–7^{(5–7)}, 6–2	(Canada) Vasek Pospisil* (United States) Jack Sock*	(Italy) Simone Bolelli (Italy) Fabio Fognini	6–4, 6–7^{(3–7)}, [10–7]
Miami Singles – Doubles	(Serbia) Novak Djokovic	(United Kingdom) Andy Murray	7–6^{(7–3)}, 4–6, 6–0	(United States) Bob Bryan (United States) Mike Bryan	(Canada) Vasek Pospisil (United States) Jack Sock	6–3, 1–6, [10–8]
Monte Carlo Singles – Doubles	(Serbia) Novak Djokovic	(Czech Republic) Tomáš Berdych	7–5, 4–6, 6–3	(United States) Bob Bryan (United States) Mike Bryan	(Italy) Simone Bolelli (Italy) Fabio Fognini	7–6^{(7–3)}, 6–1
Madrid Singles – Doubles	(United Kingdom) Andy Murray	(Spain) Rafael Nadal	6–3, 6–2	(India) Rohan Bopanna	(Poland) Marcin Matkowski (Serbia) Nenad Zimonjić	6–2, 6–7^{(5–7)}, [11–9]
Madrid Singles – Doubles	(United Kingdom) Andy Murray	(Spain) Rafael Nadal	6–3, 6–2	(Romania) Florin Mergea*	(Poland) Marcin Matkowski (Serbia) Nenad Zimonjić	6–2, 6–7^{(5–7)}, [11–9]
Rome Singles – Doubles	(Serbia) Novak Djokovic	(Switzerland) Roger Federer	6–4, 6–3	(Uruguay) Pablo Cuevas* (Spain) David Marrero*	(Spain) Marcel Granollers (Spain) Marc López	6–4, 7–5
Montreal Singles – Doubles	(United Kingdom) Andy Murray	(Serbia) Novak Djokovic	6–4, 4–6, 6–3	(United States) Bob Bryan (United States) Mike Bryan	(Canada) Daniel Nestor (France) Edouard Roger-Vasselin	7–6^{(7–5)}, 3–6, [10–6]
Cincinnati Singles – Doubles	(Switzerland) Roger Federer	(Serbia) Novak Djokovic	7–6^{(7–1)}, 6–3	(Canada) Daniel Nestor	(Poland) Marcin Matkowski (Serbia) Nenad Zimonjić	6–2, 6–2
Cincinnati Singles – Doubles	(Switzerland) Roger Federer	(Serbia) Novak Djokovic	7–6^{(7–1)}, 6–3	(France) Edouard Roger-Vasselin*	(Poland) Marcin Matkowski (Serbia) Nenad Zimonjić	6–2, 6–2
Shanghai Singles – Doubles	(Serbia) Novak Djokovic	(France) Jo-Wilfried Tsonga	6–2, 6–4	(South Africa) Raven Klaasen*	(Italy) Simone Bolelli (Italy) Fabio Fognini	6–3, 6–3
Shanghai Singles – Doubles	(Serbia) Novak Djokovic	(France) Jo-Wilfried Tsonga	6–2, 6–4	(Brazil) Marcelo Melo	(Italy) Simone Bolelli (Italy) Fabio Fognini	6–3, 6–3
Paris Singles – Doubles	(Serbia) Novak Djokovic	(United Kingdom) Andy Murray	6–2, 6–4	(Croatia) Ivan Dodig (Brazil) Marcelo Melo	(Canada) Vasek Pospisil (United States) Jack Sock	2–6, 6–3, [10–5]

=== 2016 ===
Masters	Singles champions	Runners-up	Score	Doubles champions	Runners-up	Score
Indian Wells Singles – Doubles	(Serbia) Novak Djokovic	(Canada) Milos Raonic	6–2, 6–0	(France) Pierre-Hugues Herbert* (France) Nicolas Mahut*	(Canada) Vasek Pospisil (United States) Jack Sock	6–3, 7–6^{(7–5)}
Miami Singles – Doubles	(Serbia) Novak Djokovic	(Japan) Kei Nishikori	6–3, 6–3	(France) Pierre-Hugues Herbert (France) Nicolas Mahut	(South Africa) Raven Klaasen (United States) Rajeev Ram	5–7, 6–1, [10–7]
Monte Carlo Singles – Doubles	(Spain) Rafael Nadal	(France) Gaël Monfils	7–5, 5–7, 6–0	(France) Pierre-Hugues Herbert (France) Nicolas Mahut	(United Kingdom) Jamie Murray (Brazil) Bruno Soares	4–6, 6–0, [10–6]
Madrid Singles – Doubles	(Serbia) Novak Djokovic	(United Kingdom) Andy Murray	6–2, 3–6, 6–3	(Netherlands) Jean-Julien Rojer (Romania) Horia Tecău	(India) Rohan Bopanna (Romania) Florin Mergea	6–4, 7–6^{(7–5)}
Rome Singles – Doubles	(United Kingdom) Andy Murray	(Serbia) Novak Djokovic	6–3, 6–3	(United States) Bob Bryan (United States) Mike Bryan	(Canada) Vasek Pospisil (United States) Jack Sock	2–6, 6–3, [10–7]
Toronto Singles – Doubles	(Serbia) Novak Djokovic	(Japan) Kei Nishikori	6–3, 7–5	(Croatia) Ivan Dodig (Brazil) Marcelo Melo	(United Kingdom) Jamie Murray (Brazil) Bruno Soares	6–4, 6–4
Cincinnati Singles – Doubles	(Croatia) Marin Čilić*	(United Kingdom) Andy Murray	6–4, 7–5	(Croatia) Ivan Dodig (Brazil) Marcelo Melo	(Netherlands) Jean-Julien Rojer (Romania) Horia Tecau	7–6^{(7–5)}, 6–7^{(5–7)}, [10–6]
Shanghai Singles – Doubles	(United Kingdom) Andy Murray	(Spain) Roberto Bautista Agut	7–6^{(7–1)}, 6–1	(United States) John Isner (United States) Jack Sock	(Finland) Henri Kontinen (Australia) John Peers	6–4, 6–4
Paris Singles – Doubles	(United Kingdom) Andy Murray	(United States) John Isner	6–3, 6–7^{(4–7)}, 6–4	(Finland) Henri Kontinen* (Australia) John Peers*	(France) Pierre-Hugues Herbert (France) Nicolas Mahut	6–4, 3–6, [10–6]

=== 2017 ===
Masters	Singles champions	Runners-up	Score	Doubles champions	Runners-up	Score
Indian Wells Singles – Doubles	(Switzerland) Roger Federer	(Switzerland) Stan Wawrinka	6–4, 7–5	(South Africa) Raven Klaasen	(Poland) Łukasz Kubot (Brazil) Marcelo Melo	6–7^{(1–7)}, 6–4, [10–8]
Indian Wells Singles – Doubles	(Switzerland) Roger Federer	(Switzerland) Stan Wawrinka	6–4, 7–5	(United States) Rajeev Ram*	(Poland) Łukasz Kubot (Brazil) Marcelo Melo	6–7^{(1–7)}, 6–4, [10–8]
Miami Singles – Doubles	(Switzerland) Roger Federer	(Spain) Rafael Nadal	6–3, 6–4	(Poland) Łukasz Kubot*	(United States) Nicholas Monroe (United States) Jack Sock	7–5, 6–3
Miami Singles – Doubles	(Switzerland) Roger Federer	(Spain) Rafael Nadal	6–3, 6–4	(Brazil) Marcelo Melo	(United States) Nicholas Monroe (United States) Jack Sock	7–5, 6–3
Monte Carlo Singles – Doubles	(Spain) Rafael Nadal	(Spain) Albert Ramos Viñolas	6–1, 6–3	(India) Rohan Bopanna (Uruguay) Pablo Cuevas	(Spain) Feliciano López (Spain) Marc López	6–3, 3–6, [10–4]
Madrid Singles – Doubles	(Spain) Rafael Nadal	(Austria) Dominic Thiem	7–6^{(10–8)}, 6–4	(Poland) Łukasz Kubot (Brazil) Marcelo Melo	(France) Nicolas Mahut (France) Édouard Roger-Vasselin	7–5, 6–3
Rome Singles – Doubles	(Germany) Alexander Zverev*	(Serbia) Novak Djokovic	6–4, 6–3	(France) Pierre-Hugues Herbert (France) Nicolas Mahut	(Croatia) Ivan Dodig (Spain) Marcel Granollers	4–6, 6–4, [10–3]
Montreal Singles – Doubles	(Germany) Alexander Zverev	(Switzerland) Roger Federer	6–3, 6–4	(France) Pierre-Hugues Herbert (France) Nicolas Mahut	(Croatia) Ivan Dodig (India) Rohan Bopanna	6–4, 3–6, [10–6]
Cincinnati Singles – Doubles	(Bulgaria) Grigor Dimitrov*	(Australia) Nick Kyrgios	6–3, 7–5	(France) Pierre-Hugues Herbert (France) Nicolas Mahut	(United Kingdom) Jamie Murray (Brazil) Bruno Soares	7–6^{(8–6)}, 6–4
Shanghai Singles – Doubles	(Switzerland) Roger Federer	(Spain) Rafael Nadal	6–4, 6–3	(Finland) Henri Kontinen (Australia) John Peers	(Poland) Łukasz Kubot (Brazil) Marcelo Melo	6–4, 6–2
Paris Singles – Doubles	(United States) Jack Sock*	(Serbia) Filip Krajinović	5–7, 6–4, 6–1	(Poland) Łukasz Kubot (Brazil) Marcelo Melo	(Croatia) Ivan Dodig (Spain) Marcel Granollers	7–6^{(7–3)}, 3–6, [10–6]

=== 2018 ===
Masters	Singles champions	Runners-up	Score	Doubles champions	Runners-up	Score
Indian Wells Singles – Doubles	(Argentina) Juan Martin del Potro*	(Switzerland) Roger Federer	6–4, 6–7^{(8–10)}, 7–6^{(7–2)}	(United States) John Isner (United States) Jack Sock	(United States) Bob Bryan (United States) Mike Bryan	7–6^{(7–4)}, 7–6^{(7–2)}
Miami Singles – Doubles	(United States) John Isner*	(Germany) Alexander Zverev	6–7^{(4–7)}, 6–4, 6–4	(United States) Bob Bryan (United States) Mike Bryan	(Russia) Karen Khachanov (Russia) Andrey Rublev	4–6, 7–6 ^{(7–5)}, [10–4]
Monte Carlo Singles – Doubles	(Spain) Rafael Nadal	(Japan) Kei Nishikori	6–3, 6–2	(United States) Bob Bryan (United States) Mike Bryan	(Austria) Oliver Marach (Croatia) Mate Pavić	7–6 ^{(7–5)}, 6–3
Madrid Singles – Doubles	(Germany) Alexander Zverev	(Austria) Dominic Thiem	6–4, 6–4	(Austria) Alexander Peya	(United States) Bob Bryan (United States) Mike Bryan	5–3 ret.
Madrid Singles – Doubles	(Germany) Alexander Zverev	(Austria) Dominic Thiem	6–4, 6–4	(Croatia) Nikola Mektić*	(United States) Bob Bryan (United States) Mike Bryan	5–3 ret.
Rome Singles – Doubles	(Spain) Rafael Nadal	(Germany) Alexander Zverev	6–1, 1–6, 6–3	(Colombia) Juan Sebastián Cabal* (Colombia) Robert Farah*	(Spain) Pablo Carreño Busta (Portugal) João Sousa	3–6, 6–4, [10–4]
Toronto Singles – Doubles	(Spain) Rafael Nadal	(Greece) Stefanos Tsitsipas	6–2, 7–6^{(7–4)}	(Finland) Henri Kontinen (Australia) John Peers	(South Africa) Raven Klaasen (New Zealand) Michael Venus	6–2, 6–7 ^{(7–9)}, [10–6]
Cincinnati Singles – Doubles	(Serbia) Novak Djokovic^{§}	(Switzerland) Roger Federer	6–4, 6–4	(United Kingdom) Jamie Murray	(Colombia) Juan Sebastián Cabal (Colombia) Robert Farah	4–6, 6–3, [10–6]
Cincinnati Singles – Doubles	(Serbia) Novak Djokovic^{§}	(Switzerland) Roger Federer	6–4, 6–4	(Brazil) Bruno Soares	(Colombia) Juan Sebastián Cabal (Colombia) Robert Farah	4–6, 6–3, [10–6]
Shanghai Singles – Doubles	(Serbia) Novak Djokovic	(Croatia) Borna Ćorić	6–3, 6–4	(Poland) Łukasz Kubot (Brazil) Marcelo Melo	(United Kingdom) Jamie Murray (Brazil) Bruno Soares	6–4, 6–2
Paris Singles – Doubles	(Russia) Karen Khachanov*	(Serbia) Novak Djokovic	7–5, 6–4	(Spain) Marcel Granollers (United States) Rajeev Ram	(Netherlands) Jean-Julien Rojer (Romania) Horia Tecau	6–4, 6–4

=== 2019 ===
Masters	Singles champions	Runners-up	Score	Doubles champions	Runners-up	Score
Indian Wells Singles – Doubles	(Austria) Dominic Thiem*	(Switzerland) Roger Federer	3–6, 6–3, 7–5	(Croatia) Nikola Mektić	(Poland) Łukasz Kubot (Brazil) Marcelo Melo	4–6, 6–4, [10–3]
Indian Wells Singles – Doubles	(Austria) Dominic Thiem*	(Switzerland) Roger Federer	3–6, 6–3, 7–5	(Argentina) Horacio Zeballos*	(Poland) Łukasz Kubot (Brazil) Marcelo Melo	4–6, 6–4, [10–3]
Miami Singles – Doubles	(Switzerland) Roger Federer	(United States) John Isner	6–1, 6–4	(United States) Bob Bryan (United States) Mike Bryan	(Netherlands) Wesley Koolhof (Greece) Stefanos Tsitsipas	7–5, 7–6^{(10–8)}
Monte Carlo Singles – Doubles	(Italy) Fabio Fognini*	(Serbia) Dušan Lajović	6–3, 6–4	(Croatia) Nikola Mektić	(Netherlands) Robin Haase (Netherlands) Wesley Koolhof	6–7^{(3–7)}, 7–6^{(7–3)}, [11–9]
Monte Carlo Singles – Doubles	(Italy) Fabio Fognini*	(Serbia) Dušan Lajović	6–3, 6–4	(Croatia) Franko Škugor*	(Netherlands) Robin Haase (Netherlands) Wesley Koolhof	6–7^{(3–7)}, 7–6^{(7–3)}, [11–9]
Madrid Singles – Doubles	(Serbia) Novak Djokovic	(Greece) Stefanos Tsitsipas	6–3, 6–4	(Netherlands) Jean-Julien Rojer (Romania) Horia Tecău	(Argentina) Diego Schwartzman (Austria) Dominic Thiem	6–2, 6–3
Rome Singles – Doubles	(Spain) Rafael Nadal	(Serbia) Novak Djokovic	6–0, 4–6, 6–1	(Colombia) Juan Sebastián Cabal (Colombia) Robert Farah	(South Africa) Raven Klaasen (New Zealand) Michael Venus	6–1, 6–3
Montreal Singles – Doubles	(Spain) Rafael Nadal	(Russia) Daniil Medvedev	6–3, 6–0	(Spain) Marcel Granollers (Argentina) Horacio Zeballos	(Netherlands) Robin Haase (Netherlands) Wesley Koolhof	7–5, 7–5
Cincinnati Singles – Doubles	(Russia) Daniil Medvedev*	(Belgium) David Goffin	7–6^{(7–3)}, 6–4	(Croatia) Ivan Dodig	(Colombia) Juan Sebastián Cabal (Colombia) Robert Farah	4–6, 6–4, [10–6]
Cincinnati Singles – Doubles	(Russia) Daniil Medvedev*	(Belgium) David Goffin	7–6^{(7–3)}, 6–4	(Slovakia) Filip Polášek*	(Colombia) Juan Sebastián Cabal (Colombia) Robert Farah	4–6, 6–4, [10–6]
Shanghai Singles – Doubles	(Russia) Daniil Medvedev	(Germany) Alexander Zverev	6–4, 6–1	(Croatia) Mate Pavić*	(Poland) Łukasz Kubot (Brazil) Marcelo Melo	6–4, 6–2
Shanghai Singles – Doubles	(Russia) Daniil Medvedev	(Germany) Alexander Zverev	6–4, 6–1	(Brazil) Bruno Soares	(Poland) Łukasz Kubot (Brazil) Marcelo Melo	6–4, 6–2
Paris Singles – Doubles	(Serbia) Novak Djokovic	(Canada) Denis Shapovalov	6–3, 6–4	(France) Nicolas Mahut (France) Pierre-Hugues Herbert	(Russia) Karen Khachanov (Russia) Andrey Rublev	6–4, 6–1

=== 2020 ===
Masters	Singles champions	Runners-up	Score	Doubles champions	Runners-up	Score
Indian Wells	Not held due to the COVID-19 pandemic.					
Miami	Not held due to the COVID-19 pandemic.					
Monte Carlo	Not held due to the COVID-19 pandemic.					
Madrid	Not held due to the COVID-19 pandemic.					
Canada	Not held due to the COVID-19 pandemic.					
Shanghai	Not held due to the COVID-19 pandemic.					
Cincinnati Singles – Doubles	(Serbia) Novak Djokovic^{§}	(Canada) Milos Raonic	1–6, 6–3, 6–4	(Spain) Pablo Carreño Busta* (Australia) Alex de Minaur*	(United Kingdom) Jamie Murray (United Kingdom) Neal Skupski	6–2, 7–5
Rome Singles – Doubles	(Serbia) Novak Djokovic	(Argentina) Diego Schwartzman	7–5, 6–3	(Spain) Marcel Granollers (Argentina) Horacio Zeballos	(France) Jérémy Chardy (France) Fabrice Martin	6–4, 5–7, [10–8]
Paris Singles – Doubles	(Russia) Daniil Medvedev	(Germany) Alexander Zverev	5–7, 6–4, 6–1	(Canada) Félix Auger-Aliassime* (Poland) Hubert Hurkacz*	(Croatia) Mate Pavić (Brazil) Bruno Soares	6–7^{(3–7)}, 7–6^{(9–7)}, [10–2]

=== 2021 ===
Masters	Singles champions	Runners-up	Score	Doubles champions	Runners-up	Score
Miami Open Singles – Doubles	(Poland) Hubert Hurkacz*	(Italy) Jannik Sinner	7–6^{(7–4)}, 6–4	(Croatia) Nikola Mektić (Croatia) Mate Pavić	(United Kingdom) Dan Evans (United Kingdom) Neal Skupski	6–4, 6–4
Monte-Carlo Masters Singles – Doubles	(Greece) Stefanos Tsitsipas*	(Russia) Andrey Rublev	6–3, 6–3	(Croatia) Nikola Mektić (Croatia) Mate Pavić	(United Kingdom) Dan Evans (United Kingdom) Neal Skupski	6–3, 4–6, [10–7]
Madrid Open Singles – Doubles	(Germany) Alexander Zverev	(Italy) Matteo Berrettini	6–7^{(8–10)}, 6–4, 6–3	(Spain) Marcel Granollers (Argentina) Horacio Zeballos	(Croatia) Nikola Mektić (Croatia) Mate Pavić	1–6, 6–3, [10–8]
Italian Open Singles – Doubles	(Spain) Rafael Nadal	(Serbia) Novak Djokovic	7–5, 1–6, 6–3	(Croatia) Nikola Mektić (Croatia) Mate Pavić	(United States) Rajeev Ram (United Kingdom) Joe Salisbury	6–4, 7–6^{(7–4)}
Canadian Open Singles – Doubles	(Russia) Daniil Medvedev	(United States) Reilly Opelka	6–4, 6–3	(United States) Rajeev Ram	(Croatia) Nikola Mektić (Croatia) Mate Pavić	6–3, 4–6, [10–3]
Canadian Open Singles – Doubles	(Russia) Daniil Medvedev	(United States) Reilly Opelka	6–4, 6–3	(United Kingdom) Joe Salisbury*	(Croatia) Nikola Mektić (Croatia) Mate Pavić	6–3, 4–6, [10–3]
Cincinnati Open Singles – Doubles	(Germany) Alexander Zverev	(Russia) Andrey Rublev	6–2, 6–3	(Spain) Marcel Granollers (Argentina) Horacio Zeballos	(United States) Steve Johnson (United States) Austin Krajicek	7–6^{(7–5)}, 7–6^{(7–5)}
Shanghai Masters	Not held due to the COVID-19 pandemic.					
Indian Wells Open Singles – Doubles	(United Kingdom) Cameron Norrie*	(Georgia (country)) Nikoloz Basilashvili	3–6, 6–4, 6–1	(Australia) John Peers (Slovakia) Filip Polášek	(Russia) Aslan Karatsev (Russia) Andrey Rublev	6–3, 7–6^{(7–5)}
Paris Masters Singles – Doubles	(Serbia) Novak Djokovic	(Russia) Daniil Medvedev	4–6, 6–3, 6–3	(Germany) Tim Pütz* (New Zealand) Michael Venus*	(France) Pierre-Hugues Herbert (France) Nicolas Mahut	6–3, 6–7^{(4–7)}, [11–9]

=== 2022 ===
Masters	Singles champions	Runners-up	Score	Doubles champions	Runners-up	Score
Indian Wells Open Singles – Doubles	(United States) Taylor Fritz*	(Spain) Rafael Nadal	6–3, 7–6^{(7–5)}	(United States) John Isner (United States) Jack Sock	(Mexico) Santiago González (France) Édouard Roger-Vasselin	7–6^{(7–4)}, 6–3
Miami Open Singles – Doubles	(Spain) Carlos Alcaraz*	(Norway) Casper Ruud	7–5, 6–4	(Poland) Hubert Hurkacz (United States) John Isner	(Netherlands) Wesley Koolhof (United Kingdom) Neal Skupski	7–6^{(7–5)}, 6–4
Monte-Carlo Masters Singles – Doubles	(Greece) Stefanos Tsitsipas	(Spain) Alejandro Davidovich Fokina	6–3, 7–6^{(7–3)}	(United States) Rajeev Ram (United Kingdom) Joe Salisbury	(Colombia) Juan Sebastián Cabal (Colombia) Robert Farah	6–4, 3–6, [10–7]
Madrid Open Singles – Doubles	(Spain) Carlos Alcaraz	(Germany) Alexander Zverev	6–3, 6–1	(Netherlands) Wesley Koolhof* (United Kingdom) Neal Skupski*	(Colombia) Juan Sebastián Cabal (Colombia) Robert Farah	7–6^{(7–4)}, 4–6, [10–5]
Italian Open Singles – Doubles	(Serbia) Novak Djokovic	(Greece) Stefanos Tsitsipas	6–0, 7–6^{(7–5)}	(Croatia) Nikola Mektić (Croatia) Mate Pavić	(United States) John Isner (Argentina) Diego Schwartzman	6–2, 6–7^{(6–8)}, [12–10]
Canadian Open Singles – Doubles	(Spain) Pablo Carreño Busta*	(Poland) Hubert Hurkacz	3–6, 6–3, 6–3	(Netherlands) Wesley Koolhof (United Kingdom) Neal Skupski	(United Kingdom) Dan Evans (Australia) John Peers	6–2, 4–6, [10–6]
Cincinnati Open Singles – Doubles	(Croatia) Borna Ćorić*	(Greece) Stefanos Tsitsipas	7–6^{(7–0)}, 6–2	(United States) Rajeev Ram (United Kingdom) Joe Salisbury	(Germany) Tim Pütz (New Zealand) Michael Venus	7–6^{(7–4)}, 7–6^{(7–5)}
Shanghai Masters	Not held due to the COVID-19 pandemic.					
Paris Masters Singles – Doubles	(Denmark) Holger Rune*	(Serbia) Novak Djokovic	3–6, 6–3, 7–5	(Netherlands) Wesley Koolhof (United Kingdom) Neal Skupski	(Croatia) Ivan Dodig (United States) Austin Krajicek	7–6^{(7–5)}, 6–4

=== 2023 ===
Masters	Singles champions	Runners-up	Score	Doubles champions	Runners-up	Score
Indian Wells Open Singles – Doubles	(Spain) Carlos Alcaraz	Daniil Medvedev	6–3, 6–2	(India) Rohan Bopanna	(Netherlands) Wesley Koolhof (United Kingdom) Neal Skupski	6–3, 2–6, [10–8]
Indian Wells Open Singles – Doubles	(Spain) Carlos Alcaraz	Daniil Medvedev	6–3, 6–2	(Australia) Matthew Ebden*	(Netherlands) Wesley Koolhof (United Kingdom) Neal Skupski	6–3, 2–6, [10–8]
Miami Open Singles – Doubles	Daniil Medvedev	(Italy) Jannik Sinner	7–5, 6–3	(Mexico) Santiago González*	(United States) Austin Krajicek (France) Nicolas Mahut	7–6^{(7–4)}, 7–5
Miami Open Singles – Doubles	Daniil Medvedev	(Italy) Jannik Sinner	7–5, 6–3	(France) Édouard Roger-Vasselin	(United States) Austin Krajicek (France) Nicolas Mahut	7–6^{(7–4)}, 7–5
Monte-Carlo Masters Singles – Doubles	Andrey Rublev*	(Denmark) Holger Rune	5–7, 6–2, 7–5	(Croatia) Ivan Dodig	(Monaco) Romain Arneodo (Austria) Sam Weissborn	6–0, 4–6, [14–12]
Monte-Carlo Masters Singles – Doubles	Andrey Rublev*	(Denmark) Holger Rune	5–7, 6–2, 7–5	(United States) Austin Krajicek*	(Monaco) Romain Arneodo (Austria) Sam Weissborn	6–0, 4–6, [14–12]
Madrid Open Singles – Doubles	(Spain) Carlos Alcaraz	(Germany) Jan-Lennard Struff	6–4, 3–6, 6–3	Karen Khachanov*; Andrey Rublev*	(India) Rohan Bopanna (Australia) Matthew Ebden	6–3, 3–6, [10–3]
Italian Open Singles – Doubles	Daniil Medvedev	(Denmark) Holger Rune	7–5, 7–5	(Monaco) Hugo Nys* (Poland) Jan Zieliński*	(Netherlands) Robin Haase (Netherlands) Botic van de Zandschulp	7–5, 6–1
Canadian Open Singles – Doubles	(Italy) Jannik Sinner*	(Australia) Alex de Minaur	6–4, 6–1	(El Salvador) Marcelo Arévalo*	(United States) Rajeev Ram (United Kingdom) Joe Salisbury	6–3, 6–1
Canadian Open Singles – Doubles	(Italy) Jannik Sinner*	(Australia) Alex de Minaur	6–4, 6–1	(Netherlands) Jean-Julien Rojer	(United States) Rajeev Ram (United Kingdom) Joe Salisbury	6–3, 6–1
Cincinnati Open Singles – Doubles	(Serbia) Novak Djokovic	(Spain) Carlos Alcaraz	5–7, 7–6^{(9–7)}, 7–6^{(7–4)}	(Argentina) Máximo González* (Argentina) Andrés Molteni*	(United Kingdom) Jamie Murray (New Zealand) Michael Venus	3–6, 6–1, [11–9]
Shanghai Masters Singles – Doubles	(Poland) Hubert Hurkacz	Andrey Rublev	6–3, 3–6, 7–6^{(10–8)}	(Spain) Marcel Granollers (Argentina) Horacio Zeballos	(India) Rohan Bopanna (Australia) Matthew Ebden	5–7, 6–2, [10–7]
Paris Masters Singles – Doubles	(Serbia) Novak Djokovic	(Bulgaria) Grigor Dimitrov	6–4, 6–3	(Mexico) Santiago González (France) Édouard Roger-Vasselin	(India) Rohan Bopanna (Australia) Matthew Ebden	6–2, 5–7, [10–7]

=== 2024 ===
ATP 1000	Singles champions	Runners-up	Score	Doubles champions	Runners-up	Score
Indian Wells Open Singles – Doubles	(Spain) Carlos Alcaraz	Daniil Medvedev	7–6^{(7–5)}, 6–1	(Netherlands) Wesley Koolhof (Croatia) Nikola Mektić	(Spain) Marcel Granollers (Argentina) Horacio Zeballos	7–6^{(7–2)}, 7–6^{(7–4)}
Miami Open Singles – Doubles	(Italy) Jannik Sinner	(Bulgaria) Grigor Dimitrov	6–3, 6–1	(India) Rohan Bopanna (Australia) Matthew Ebden	(Croatia) Ivan Dodig (United States) Austin Krajicek	6–7^{(3–7)}, 6–3, [10–6]
Monte-Carlo Masters Singles – Doubles	(Greece) Stefanos Tsitsipas	(Norway) Casper Ruud	6–1, 6–4	(Belgium) Sander Gillé* (Belgium) Joran Vliegen*	(Brazil) Marcelo Melo (Germany) Alexander Zverev	5–7, 6–3, [10–5]
Madrid Open Singles – Doubles	Andrey Rublev	(Canada) Félix Auger-Aliassime	4–6, 7–5, 7–5	(United States) Sebastian Korda* (Australia) Jordan Thompson*	(Uruguay) Ariel Behar (Czech Republic) Adam Pavlásek	6–3, 7–6^{(9–7)}
Italian Open Singles – Doubles	(Germany) Alexander Zverev	(Chile) Nicolás Jarry	6–4, 7–5	(Spain) Marcel Granollers (Argentina) Horacio Zeballos	(El Salvador) Marcelo Arévalo (Croatia) Mate Pavić	6–2, 6–2
Canadian Open Singles – Doubles	(Australia) Alexei Popyrin*	Andrey Rublev	6–2, 6–4	(Spain) Marcel Granollers (Argentina) Horacio Zeballos	(United States) Rajeev Ram (United Kingdom) Joe Salisbury	6–2, 7–6^{(7–4)}
Cincinnati Open Singles – Doubles	(Italy) Jannik Sinner	(United States) Frances Tiafoe	7–6^{(7–4)}, 6–2	(El Salvador) Marcelo Arévalo (Croatia) Mate Pavić	(United States) Mackenzie McDonald (United States) Alex Michelsen	6–2, 6–4
Shanghai Masters Singles – Doubles	(Italy) Jannik Sinner	(Serbia) Novak Djokovic	7–6^{(7–4)}, 6–3	(Netherlands) Wesley Koolhof (Croatia) Nikola Mektić	(Argentina) Máximo González (Argentina) Andrés Molteni	6–4, 6–4
Paris Masters Singles – Doubles	(Germany) Alexander Zverev	(France) Ugo Humbert	6–2, 6–2	(Netherlands) Wesley Koolhof (Croatia) Nikola Mektić	(United Kingdom) Lloyd Glasspool (Czech Republic) Adam Pavlásek	3–6, 6–3, [10–5]

=== 2025 ===
ATP Masters 1000	Singles champions	Runners-up	Score	Doubles champions	Runners-up	Score
Indian Wells Open Singles – Doubles	(United Kingdom) Jack Draper*	(Denmark) Holger Rune	6–2, 6–2	(El Salvador) Marcelo Arévalo (Croatia) Mate Pavić	(United States) Sebastian Korda (Australia) Jordan Thompson	6–3, 6–4
Miami Open Singles – Doubles	(Czech Republic) Jakub Menšík*	(Serbia) Novak Djokovic	7–6^{(7–4)}, 7–6^{(7–4)}	(El Salvador) Marcelo Arévalo (Croatia) Mate Pavić	(United Kingdom) Julian Cash (United Kingdom) Lloyd Glasspool	7–6^{(7–3)}, 6–3
Monte-Carlo Masters Singles – Doubles	(Spain) Carlos Alcaraz	(Italy) Lorenzo Musetti	3–6, 6–1, 6–0	(Monaco) Romain Arneodo* (France) Manuel Guinard*	(United Kingdom) Julian Cash (United Kingdom) Lloyd Glasspool	1–6, 7–6^{(10–8)}, [10–8]
Madrid Open Singles – Doubles	(Norway) Casper Ruud*	(United Kingdom) Jack Draper	7–5, 3–6, 6–4	(Spain) Marcel Granollers (Argentina) Horacio Zeballos	(El Salvador) Marcelo Arévalo (Croatia) Mate Pavić	6–4, 6–4
Italian Open Singles – Doubles	(Spain) Carlos Alcaraz	(Italy) Jannik Sinner	7–6^{(7–5)}, 6–1	(El Salvador) Marcelo Arévalo (Croatia) Mate Pavić	(France) Sadio Doumbia (France) Fabien Reboul	6–4, 6–7^{(6–8)}, [13–11]
Canadian Open Singles – Doubles	(United States) Ben Shelton*	Karen Khachanov	6–7^{(5–7)}, 6–4, 7–6^{(7–3)}	(United Kingdom) Julian Cash* (United Kingdom) Lloyd Glasspool*	(United Kingdom) Joe Salisbury (United Kingdom) Neal Skupski	6–3, 6–7^{(5–7)}, [13–11]
Cincinnati Open Singles – Doubles	(Spain) Carlos Alcaraz	(Italy) Jannik Sinner	5–0 (ret.)	(Croatia) Nikola Mektić (United States) Rajeev Ram	(Italy) Lorenzo Musetti (Italy) Lorenzo Sonego	4–6, 6–3, [10–5]
Shanghai Masters Singles – Doubles	(Monaco) Valentin Vacherot*	(France) Arthur Rinderknech	4–6, 6–3, 6–3	(Germany) Kevin Krawietz*	(Sweden) André Göransson (United States) Alex Michelsen	6–4, 6–4
Shanghai Masters Singles – Doubles	(Monaco) Valentin Vacherot*	(France) Arthur Rinderknech	4–6, 6–3, 6–3	(Germany) Tim Pütz	(Sweden) André Göransson (United States) Alex Michelsen	6–4, 6–4
Paris Masters Singles – Doubles	(Italy) Jannik Sinner	(Canada) Félix Auger-Aliassime	6–4, 7–6^{(7–4)}	(Finland) Harri Heliövaara* (United Kingdom) Henry Patten*	(United Kingdom) Julian Cash (United Kingdom) Lloyd Glasspool	6–3, 6–4

== Records and statistics ==
- Active players in **bold**.

=== Title leaders ===
Singles
No.	Titles
40	(Serbia) **Novak Djokovic**
36	(Spain) Rafael Nadal
28	(Switzerland) Roger Federer
17	(United States) Andre Agassi
14	(United Kingdom) Andy Murray
11	(United States) Pete Sampras
10	(Italy) **Jannik Sinner**
9	(Spain) **Carlos Alcaraz**
8	(Austria) Thomas Muster
7	(United States) Michael Chang
7	(Germany) **Alexander Zverev**

Doubles
No.	Titles
39	(United States) Bob Bryan
39	(United States) Mike Bryan
28	(Canada) Daniel Nestor
18	(Australia) Todd Woodbridge
17	(The Bahamas) Mark Knowles
16	(Belarus) Max Mirnyi
16	(India) Mahesh Bhupathi
15	(Sweden) Jonas Björkman
15	(Serbia) Nenad Zimonjić
14	(Australia) Mark Woodforde

=== Titles on different surfaces ===
Singles
No.	Player
9	Roger Federer
9	Novak Djokovic
9	Jannik Sinner
8	Rafael Nadal
8	Andy Murray

Doubles
No.	Player
12	Bob Bryan
12	Mike Bryan
11	Daniel Nestor
11	(Belarus) Max Mirnyi

=== Career Golden Masters ===
The achievement of winning all of the active nine ATP 1000 Masters tournaments over the course of a player's career.

- The event at which the Career Golden Masters was accomplished indicated in **bold**.

Singles

Player	Indian Wells (hard)	Miami (hard)	Monte Carlo (clay)	Madrid (clay)	Italy (clay)	Canada (hard)	Cincinnati (hard)	Shanghai (hard)	Paris (hard indoor)
Novak Djokovic	2008	2007	2013	2011	2008	2007	**2018**	2012	2009
Novak Djokovic	2011	2011	2015	2016	2011	2011	**2020**	2013	2013
Jannik Sinner	2026	2024	2026	2026	**2026**	2023	2024	2024	2025

Doubles

Player	Indian Wells (hard)	Miami (hard)	Monte Carlo (clay)	Madrid (clay)	Italy (clay)	Canada (hard)	Cincinnati (hard)	Shanghai (hard)	Paris (hard indoor)
Daniel Nestor (Note: They additionally won the previously held Madrid Masters on indoors and the Hamburg Masters on clay.)	1997	2002	2009	2009	1997	2000	1996	**2011***	2009
Bob Bryan	2013	2007	2007	2010	2008	2002	2003	**2014***	2005
Mike Bryan	2013	2007	2007	2010	2008	2002	2003	**2014***	2005

=== Double crown ===
- Winning the same ATP Masters 1000 tournament in both singles and doubles in the same year.

Player	Tournament
(United States) Jim Courier	1991 Indian Wells
(Spain) Rafael Nadal	2008 Monte Carlo

== Broadcasting rights ==
Africa

- Africa: Canal+ Afrique, SuperSport
- Middle East & North Africa: beIN Sports

America

- Latin America: ESPN
- Caribbean: ESPN
- Canada: TSN, Sportsnet
- United States: Tennis Channel
- Puerto Rico: ESPN Deportes

Asia & Oceania

- Australia: beIN Sports
- India: SonyLIV

Europe

- Continental Europe: Eurosport
- Germany: Sky Deutschland
- Italy: Sky Italia, SuperTennis
- France: Eurosport
- Poland: Polsat Sport
- Spain: Telecinco
- United Kingdom: Prime Video

== See also ==
Overall statistics

- Grand Slam tennis tournaments
- List of ATP Big Titles singles champions
- List of ATP Big Titles doubles champions
- Grand Prix Super Series

WTA Tour records

- WTA 1000 tournaments
- WTA 1000 Series singles records and statistics
- WTA 1000 Series doubles records and statistics
- List of WTA Tour top-level tournament singles champions
- List of WTA Tour top-level tournament doubles champions
- WTA Premier Mandatory and Premier 5
- WTA Tier I tournaments
