= 1995 Eurocard Open (October) =

- Date: 23–30 October
- Edition: 7th (1st in Essen)
- Category: Championship Series, Single Week
- Draw: 48S / 24D
- Prize money: $1,844,000
- Surface: Carpet / indoors
- Location: Essen, Germany

Champions

Singles
- (Austria) Thomas Muster

Doubles
- (Netherlands) Jacco Eltingh / (Netherlands) Paul Haarhuis
- Eurocard Open

The 1995 Eurocard Open was a men's tennis tournament played on indoor carpet courts, was the only edition of the Essen Masters held in Essen, Germany. Although it was the 1st and only edition of the Essen tournament, the tournament had been held in Stuttgart on six previous occasions. It was part of the Championship Series of the 1995 ATP Tour and was held from 23 October until 30 October 1995. Third-seeded Thomas Muster won the singles title.

== Finals ==
=== Singles ===
(Austria) Thomas Muster defeated (United States) MaliVai Washington, 7–6^{(8–6)}, 2–6, 6–3, 6–4

- It was Muster's 12th title of the year and 35th of his career.

=== Doubles ===
(Netherlands) Jacco Eltingh / (Netherlands) Paul Haarhuis defeated (Czech Republic) Cyril Suk / (Czech Republic) Daniel Vacek, 7–5, 6–7, 6–4
