= 1995 Eurocard Open (October) – Singles =

Singles
- 1995 Eurocard Open (October)

Final
- Champion: (Austria) Thomas Muster
- Runner-up: (United States) MaliVai Washington
- Score: 7–6^{(8–6)}, 2–6, 6–3, 6–4

Details
- Draw: 48
- Seeds: 16

Events
Singles	Doubles
← 1995 ·	Eurocard Open	· 1996 →

Thomas Muster defeated MaliVai Washington in the final, 7–6^{(8–6)}, 2–6, 6–3, 6–4 to win the singles tennis title at the October edition of the 1995 Eurocard Open.

== Seeds ==
All sixteen seeds receive a bye into the second round.

1. (United States) Andre Agassi (third round)
2. (United States) Pete Sampras (semifinals)
3. (Austria) Thomas Muster (champion)
4. (Germany) Boris Becker (third round)
5. (United States) Michael Chang (second round)
6. (Russia) Yevgeny Kafelnikov (third round)
7. (United States) Jim Courier (quarterfinals)
8. (Croatia) Goran Ivanišević (second round)
9. (Sweden) Thomas Enqvist (quarterfinals)
10. (Switzerland) Marc Rosset (third round)
11. (Spain) Sergi Bruguera (quarterfinals)
12. (South Africa) Wayne Ferreira (second round)
13. (Netherlands) Richard Krajicek (quarterfinals)
14. (Ukraine) Andrei Medvedev (third round)
15. (Netherlands) Jan Siemerink (second round)
16. (Italy) Andrea Gaudenzi (second round)

== Draw ==
=== Key ===
- Q = Qualifier
- WC = Wild card
- LL = Lucky loser
- Alt = Alternate
- SE = Special exempt
- PR = Protected ranking
- ITF = ITF entry
- JE = Junior exempt
- w/o = Walkover
- r = Retired
- d = Defaulted
- SR = Special ranking

=== Finals ===
Quarterfinals
(United States) MaliVai Washington	7	6
9	(Sweden) Thomas Enqvist	5	4
13	(Netherlands) Richard Krajicek	4	2
(France) Arnaud Boetsch	6	6
11	(Spain) Sergi Bruguera	4	6^{3}
3	(Austria) Thomas Muster	6	7^{7}
7	(United States) Jim Courier	2	6^{6}
2	(United States) Pete Sampras	6	7^{8}

Semifinals
(United States) MaliVai Washington	7	6
(France) Arnaud Boetsch	5	2
3	(Austria) Thomas Muster	7^{8}	6
2	(United States) Pete Sampras	6^{6}	2

Final
(United States) MaliVai Washington	6^{6}	6	3	4
3	(Austria) Thomas Muster	7^{8}	2	6	6

=== Section 1 ===
First round
(Germany) B Karbacher	2	4
(Netherlands) J Eltingh	6	6
WC	(Germany) N Kiefer	6	0	4
(United States) M Washington	3	6	6
(United States) D Wheaton	6^{7}	4
(United States) T Martin	7	6
WC	(Germany) M Sinner	3	6	6
WC	(Australia) M Philippoussis	6	4	3

Second round
1	(United States) A Agassi	6	6
(Netherlands) J Eltingh	2	4
(United States) M Washington	7	4	6
16	(Italy) A Gaudenzi	5	6	3
9	(Sweden) T Enqvist	6	6
(United States) T Martin	3	4
WC	(Germany) M Sinner	4	7	6
8	(Croatia) G Ivanišević	6	6^{5}	4

Third round
1	(United States) A Agassi	6	1	1
(United States) M Washington	4	6	6
9	(Sweden) T Enqvist	6	6
WC	(Germany) M Sinner	4	3

Quarterfinals
(United States) M Washington	7	6
9	(Sweden) T Enqvist	5	4

=== Section 2 ===
First round
(Sweden) M Gustafsson	6	6
(United States) A Krickstein	4	2
(New Zealand) B Steven	7	6
Q	(United States) A O'Brien	6^{4}	3
(Australia) T Woodbridge	3	4
(France) A Boetsch	6	6
(Spain) A Berasategui	6^{5}	2
(Russia) A Volkov	7	6

Second round
4	(Germany) B Becker	7	6
(Sweden) M Gustafsson	6^{2}	4
(New Zealand) B Steven	3	4
13	(Netherlands) R Krajicek	6	6
12	(South Africa) W Ferreira	3	2
(France) A Boetsch	6	6
(Russia) A Volkov	4	6	1
6	(Russia) Y Kafelnikov	6	2	6

Third round
4	(Germany) B Becker	4	7	3
13	(Netherlands) R Krajicek	6	6^{4}	6
(France) A Boetsch	2	6	6
6	(Russia) Y Kafelnikov	6	3	1

Quarterfinals
13	(Netherlands) R Krajicek	4	2
(France) A Boetsch	6	6

=== Section 3 ===
First round
(France) G Forget	3	6	1
Q	(Czech Republic) D Vacek	6	1	6
(Netherlands) P Haarhuis	1	1
Q	(Netherlands) J Winnink	6	6
(Argentina) J Frana	6	6
Q	(Uzbekistan) O Ogorodov	2	2
Q	(Germany) P Kühnen	3	1
(Zimbabwe) B Black	6	6

Second round
5	(United States) M Chang	2	6^{5}
Q	(Czech Republic) D Vacek	6	7
Q	(Netherlands) J Winnink	3	2
11	(Spain) S Bruguera	6	6
14	(Ukraine) A Medvedev	6	6
(Argentina) J Frana	2	4
(Zimbabwe) B Black	2	3
3	(Austria) T Muster	6	6

Third round
Q	(Czech Republic) D Vacek	6^{6}	6^{1}
11	(Spain) S Bruguera	7	7
14	(Ukraine) A Medvedev	4	3
3	(Austria) T Muster	6	6

Quarterfinals
11	(Spain) S Bruguera	4	6^{3}
3	(Austria) T Muster	6	7

=== Section 4 ===
First round
WC	(Germany) C-U Steeb	0	7	5
Q	(Germany) A Rădulescu	6	6^{2}	7
(United Kingdom) G Rusedski	3	7	6
(Sweden) J Björkman	6	6^{7}	4
(United States) P McEnroe	3	2
(Australia) M Woodforde	6	6
(Italy) R Furlan	3	1
Q	(Sweden) S Edberg	6	6

Second round
7	(United States) J Courier	6	7
Q	(Germany) A Rădulescu	0	6^{3}
(United Kingdom) G Rusedski	4	4
10	(Switzerland) M Rosset	6	6
15	(Netherlands) J Siemerink	3	4
(Australia) M Woodforde	6	6
(Sweden) S Edberg	3	2
2	(United States) P Sampras	6	6

Third round
7	(United States) J Courier	7	3	6
10	(Switzerland) M Rosset	6^{4}	6	3
(Australia) M Woodforde	2	4
2	(United States) P Sampras	6	6

Quarterfinals
7	(United States) J Courier	2	6^{6}
2	(United States) P Sampras	6	7
