= 1995 Eurocard Open (October) – Doubles =

Doubles
- 1995 Eurocard Open (October)

Final
- Champions: (Netherlands) Jacco Eltingh (Netherlands) Paul Haarhuis
- Runners-up: (Czech Republic) Cyril Suk (Czech Republic) Daniel Vacek
- Score: 7–5, 6–4

Events
Singles	Doubles
← 1995 ·	Eurocard Open (October)	· 1996 →

Grant Connell and Patrick Galbraith were the defending champions but lost in the semifinals 3–6, 4–6 against Jacco Eltingh and Paul Haarhuis the eventual champions.

== Draw ==
Key

- Q = Qualifier
- WC = Wild card
- LL = Lucky loser
- Alt = Alternate
- ITF = ITF entry
- PR = Protected ranking
- SR = Special ranking
- SE = Special exempt
- JE = Junior exempt
- JR = Junior Accelerator Programme entrant
- CO = College Accelerator Programme entrant
- NG = Next Gen Accelerator Program entrant
- w/o = Walkover
- r = Retired
- d = Defaulted

=== Final ===
Semifinals
1	(Australia) Todd Woodbridge (Australia) Mark Woodforde	2	1
5	(Czech Republic) Cyril Suk (Czech Republic) Daniel Vacek	6	6
3	(Canada) Grant Connell (United States) Patrick Galbraith	3	4
2	(Netherlands) Jacco Eltingh (Netherlands) Paul Haarhuis	6	6

Finals
5	(Czech Republic) Cyril Suk (Czech Republic) Daniel Vacek	5	4
2	(Netherlands) Jacco Eltingh (Netherlands) Paul Haarhuis	7	6

=== Top half ===
First round
WC	(United States) A Agassi (Switzerland) M Rosset	6	6
(United States) T Ho (New Zealand) B Steven	4	0
(United States) J Palmer (United States) R Reneberg	6	2	6
(South Africa) W Ferreira (Russia) Y Kafelnikov	3	6	7
WC	(Germany) B Becker (Germany) P Kühnen	6	2	7
(Netherlands) H-J Davids (South Africa) P Norval	4	6	6
(South Africa) J-L De Jager (United States) J Tarango	7	6
(United States) M Keil (Sweden) P Nyborg	6	3

Second round
1	(Australia) T Woodbridge (Australia) M Woodforde	w/o
WC	(United States) A Agassi (Switzerland) M Rosset
(South Africa) W Ferreira (Russia) Y Kafelnikov	5	6	6
8	(United States) R Leach (United States) S Melville	7	4	4
4	(The Bahamas) M Knowles (Canada) D Nestor	6	3	2
WC	(Germany) B Becker (Germany) P Kühnen	3	6	6
(South Africa) J-L De Jager (United States) J Tarango	3	4
5	(Czech Republic) C Suk (Czech Republic) D Vacek	6	6

Quarterfinals
1	(Australia) T Woodbridge (Australia) M Woodforde	w/o
(South Africa) W Ferreira (Russia) Y Kafelnikov
WC	(Germany) B Becker (Germany) P Kühnen
5	(Czech Republic) C Suk (Czech Republic) D Vacek	w/o

Semifinals
1	(Australia) T Woodbridge (Australia) M Woodforde	2	1
5	(Czech Republic) C Suk (Czech Republic) D Vacek	6	6

=== Bottom half ===
First round
(United States) A O'Brien (Australia) S Stolle	3	6	6
(Sweden) J Björkman (France) G Forget	6	3	7
(United States) T Kronemann (Australia) D Macpherson	6	6	7
(United States) M Bauer (Netherlands) M Oosting	4	7	6
WC	(Germany) M-K Goellner (Germany) D Prinosil	7	6	7
WC	(Italy) A Gaudenzi (Croatia) G Ivanišević	6	7	6
(United States) L Jensen (United States) D Wheaton	2	0
Q	(Germany) M Sinner (Netherlands) J Winnink	6	6

Second round
6	(Zimbabwe) B Black (United States) J Stark	4	6	6
(Sweden) J Björkman (France) G Forget	6	3	2
(United States) T Kronemann (Australia) D Macpherson	2	7	4
3	(Canada) G Connell (United States) P Galbraith	6	6	6
7	(United States) J Grabb (United States) P McEnroe	5	7	4
WC	(Germany) M-K Goellner (Germany) D Prinosil	7	6	6
Q	(Germany) M Sinner (Netherlands) J Winnink	5	3
2	(Netherlands) J Eltingh (Netherlands) P Haarhuis	7	6

Quarterfinals
6	(Zimbabwe) B Black (United States) J Stark	2	2
3	(Canada) G Connell (United States) P Galbraith	6	6
WC	(Germany) M-K Goellner (Germany) D Prinosil	3	6
2	(Netherlands) J Eltingh (Netherlands) P Haarhuis	6	7

Semifinals
3	(Canada) G Connell (United States) P Galbraith	3	4
2	(Netherlands) J Eltingh (Netherlands) P Haarhuis	6	6
