= ATP Masters 1000 doubles records and statistics =

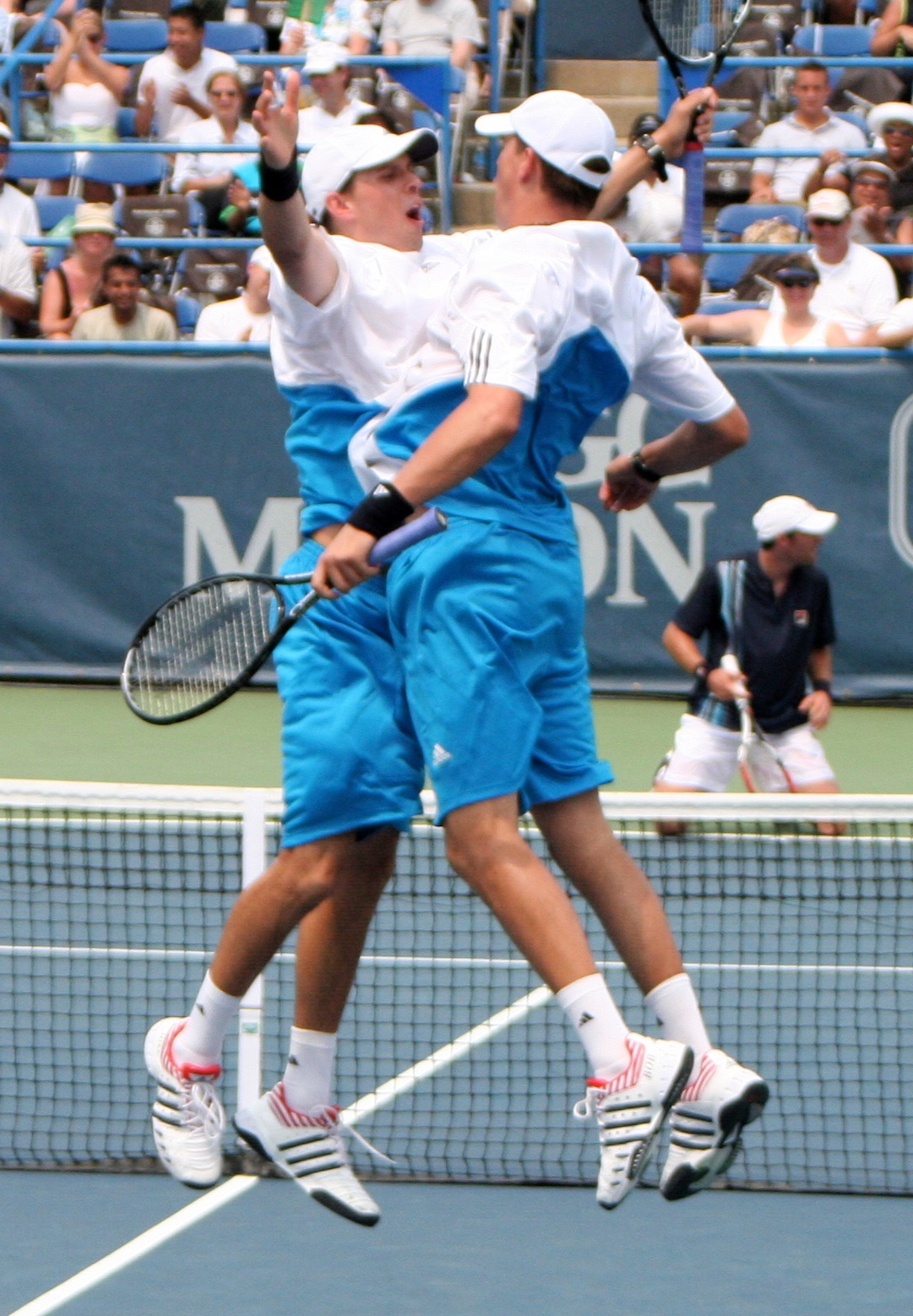
The Bryan brothers have won a record 39 ATP Masters titles.

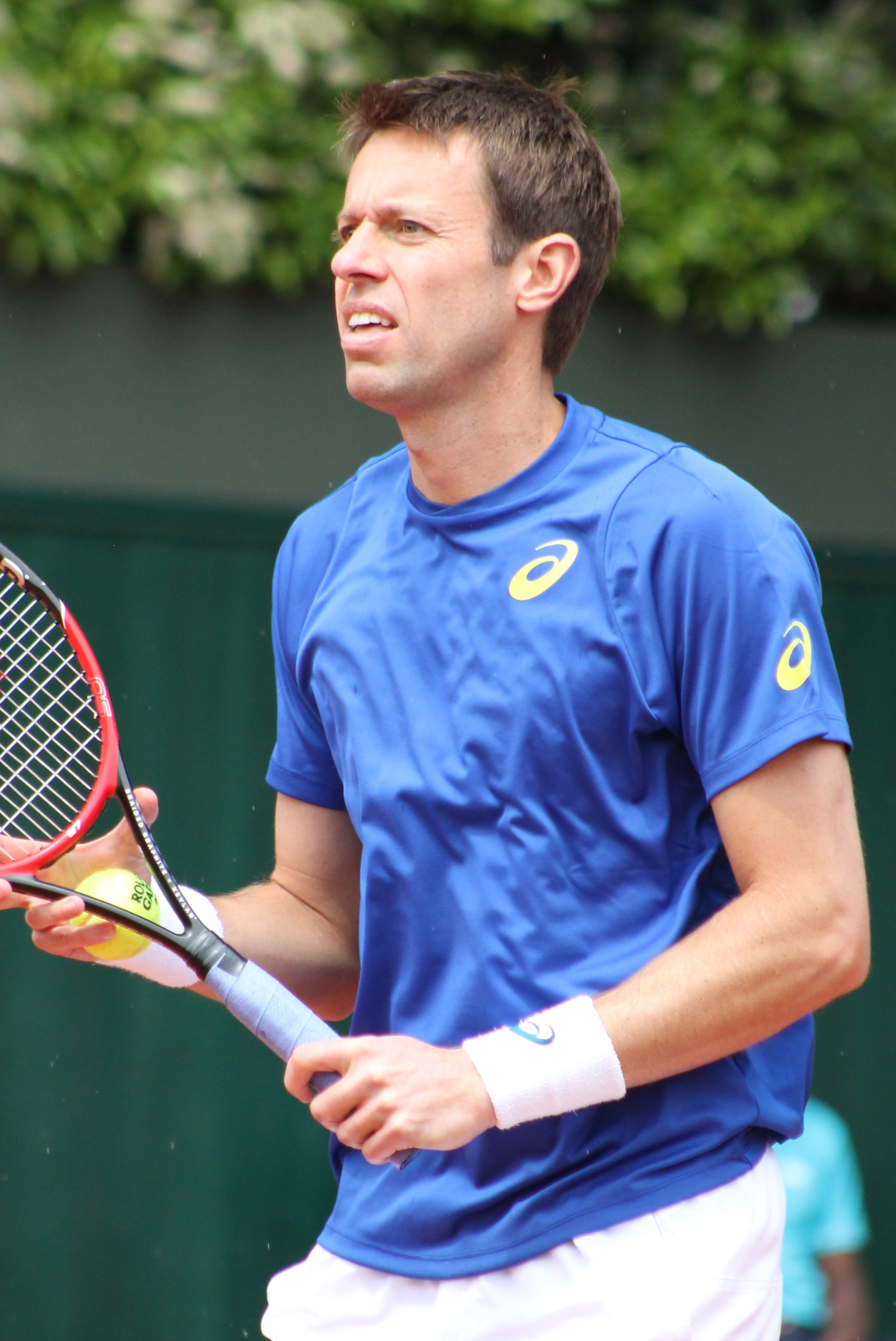
Daniel Nestor is the first player to complete the Golden Masters.

In tennis, the ATP Masters is an annual series of nine top-level tennis tournaments featuring the elite men's tennis players on the ATP Tour. The tournaments are important for the top players on the professional circuit as the series constituted the most prestigious tournaments in men's tennis after the four Grand Slam events. The Masters series along with the Grand Slam tournaments, the ATP Finals championship and the Olympic Games are considered the top-tier events of men's tennis, referred to by the ATP as the "Big Titles".

== Champions by year ==
Active tournaments	Defunct tournaments

Year	Indian Wells	Miami	Monte Carlo	Hamburg	Rome	Canada	Cincinnati	Stockholm	Paris
1990	Becker (1/2); Forget (1/3)	Leach (1/4); Pugh (1/1)	P. Korda (1/3); Šmíd (1/1)	Bruguera (1/1); Courier (1/3)	Casal (1/3); E. Sánchez (1/3)	Annacone (1/1); Wheaton (1/1)	Cahill (1/1); M. Kratzmann (1/1)	Forget (2/3); Hlasek (1/2)	Davis (1/1); Pate (1/1)
1991	Courier (2/3); J. Sánchez (1/2)	W. Ferreira (1/6); Norval (1/2)	Jensen (1/1); Warder (1/1)	Casal (2/3); E. Sánchez (2/3)	Camporese (1/1); Ivanišević (1/1)	Galbraith (1/5); Witsken (1/2)	Flach (1/2); Seguso (1/1)	Fitzgerald (1/2); Järryd (1/2)	Fitzgerald (2/2); Järryd (2/2)
1992	DeVries (1/1); Macpherson (1/1)	Flach (2/2); Witsken (2/2)	Becker (2/2); Stich (1/1)	Casal (3/3); E. Sánchez (3/3)	Hlasek (2/2); Rosset (1/1)	Galbraith (2/5); Visser (1/1)	Woodbridge (1/18); Woodforde (1/14)	Woodbridge (2/18); Woodforde (2/14)	J. McEnroe (1/1); P. McEnroe (1/1)
1993	Forget (3/3); Leconte (1/1)	R. Krajicek (1/1); Siemerink (1/2)	Edberg (1/1); P. Korda (2/3)	Haarhuis (1/10); Koevermans (1/1)	Eltingh (1/8); Haarhuis (2/10)	Courier (3/3); Knowles (1/17)	Agassi (1/1); P. Korda (3/3)	Woodbridge (3/18); Woodforde (3/14)	B. Black (1/5); Stark (1/2)
1994	Connell (1/3); Galbraith (3/5)	Eltingh (2/8); Haarhuis (3/10)	Kulti (1/2); Larsson (1/1)	Melville (1/1); Norval (2/2)	Kafelnikov (1/7); Rikl (1/4)	B. Black (2/5); Stark (2/2)	O'Brien (1/5); Stolle (1/4)	Woodbridge (4/18); Woodforde (4/14)	Eltingh (3/8); Haarhuis (4/10)
								↓ Stuttgart ↓	
1995	Ho (1/1); Steven (1/1)	Woodbridge (5/18); Woodforde (5/14)	Eltingh (4/8); Haarhuis (5/10)	W. Ferreira (2/6); Kafelnikov (2/7)	Suk (1/2); Vacek (1/1)	Kafelnikov (3/7); Olhovskiy (1/1)	Woodbridge (6/18); Woodforde (6/14)	Eltingh (5/8); Haarhuis (6/10)	Connell (2/3); Galbraith (4/5)
1996	Woodbridge (7/18); Woodforde (7/14)	Woodbridge (8/18); Woodforde (8/14)	E. Ferreira (1/4); Siemerink (2/2)	Knowles (2/17); Nestor (1/28)	B. Black (3/5); Connell (3/3)	Knowles (3/17); Nestor (2/28)	Galbraith (5/5); Haarhuis (7/10)	Lareau (1/4); O'Brien (2/5)	Eltingh (6/8); Haarhuis (8/10)
1997	Knowles (4/17); Nestor (3/28)	Woodbridge (9/18); Woodforde (9/14)	Johnson (1/2); Montana (1/2)	Lobo (1/1); J. Sánchez (3/3)	Knowles (5/17); Nestor (4/28)	Bhupathi (1/16); Paes (1/13)	Woodbridge (10/18); Woodforde (10/14)	Woodbridge (11/18); Woodforde (11/14)	Eltingh (7/8); Haarhuis (9/10)
1998	Björkman (1/15); Rafter (1/2)	E. Ferreira (2/4); Leach (2/4)	Eltingh (8/8); Haarhuis (10/10)	Johnson (2/2); Montana (2/2)	Bhupathi (2/16); Paes (2/13)	Damm (1/4); Grabb (1/1)	Knowles (6/17); Nestor (5/28)	Lareau (2/4); O'Brien (3/5)	Bhupathi (3/16); Paes (3/13)
1999	W. Black (1/5); Stolle (2/4)	W. Black (2/5); Stolle (3/4)	Delaître (1/1); Henman (1/2)	Arthurs (1/3); A. Kratzmann (1/1)	E. Ferreira (3/4); Leach (3/4)	Björkman (2/15); Rafter (2/2)	Björkman (3/15); B. Black (4/5)	Björkman (4/15); B. Black (5/5)	Lareau (3/4); O'Brien (4/5)
2000	O'Brien (5/5); Palmer (1/1)	Woodbridge (12/18); Woodforde (12/14)	W. Ferreira (3/6); Kafelnikov (4/7)	Woodbridge (13/18); Woodforde (13/14)	Damm (2/4); Hrbatý (1/1)	Lareau (4/4); Nestor (6/28)	Woodbridge (14/18); Woodforde (14/14)	Novák (1/3); Rikl (2/4)	Kulti (2/2); Mirnyi (1/16)
2001	W. Ferreira (4/6); Kafelnikov (5/7)	Novák (2/3); Rikl (3/4)	Björkman (5/15); Woodbridge (15/18)	Björkman (6/15); Woodbridge (16/18)	W. Ferreira (5/6); Kafelnikov (6/7)	Novák (3/3); Rikl (4/4)	Bhupathi (4/16); Paes (4/13)	Mirnyi (2/16); Stolle (4/4)	E. Ferreira (4/4); Leach (4/4)
								↓ Madrid ↓	
2002	Knowles (7/17); Nestor (7/28)	Knowles (8/17); Nestor (8/28)	Björkman (7/15); Woodbridge (17/18)	Bhupathi (5/16); Gambill (1/1)	Damm (3/4); Suk (2/2)	B. Bryan (1/39); M. Bryan (1/39)	Blake (1/1); Martin (1/1)	Knowles (9/17); Nestor (9/28)	Escudé (1/1); Santoro (1/3)
2003	W. Ferreira (6/6); Kafelnikov (7/7)	Federer (1/1); Mirnyi (3/16)	Bhupathi (6/16); Mirnyi (4/16)	Knowles (10/17); Nestor (10/28)	Arthurs (2/3); Hanley (1/3)	Bhupathi (7/16); Mirnyi (5/16)	B. Bryan (2/39); M. Bryan (2/39)	Bhupathi (8/16); Mirnyi (6/16)	Arthurs (3/3); Hanley (2/3)
2004	Clément (1/2); Grosjean (1/1)	W. Black (3/5); Ullyett (1/5)	Henman (2/2); Zimonjić (1/15)	W. Black (4/5); Ullyett (2/5)	Bhupathi (9/16); Mirnyi (7/16)	Bhupathi (10/16); Paes (5/13)	Knowles (11/17); Nestor (11/28)	Knowles (12/17); Nestor (12/28)	Björkman (8/15); Woodbridge (18/18)
2005	Knowles (13/17); Nestor (13/28)	Björkman (9/15); Mirnyi (8/16)	Paes (6/13); Zimonjić (2/15)	Björkman (10/15); Mirnyi (9/16)	Llodra (1/3); Santoro (2/3)	W. Black (5/5); Ullyett (3/5)	Björkman (11/15); Mirnyi (10/16)	Knowles (14/17); Nestor (14/28)	B. Bryan (3/39); M. Bryan (3/39)
2006	Knowles (15/17); Nestor (15/28)	Björkman (12/15); Mirnyi (11/16)	Björkman (13/15); Mirnyi (12/16)	Hanley (3/3); Ullyett (4/5)	Knowles (16/17); Nestor (16/28)	B. Bryan (4/39); M. Bryan (4/39)	Björkman (14/15); Mirnyi (13/16)	B. Bryan (5/39); M. Bryan (5/39)	Clément (2/2); Llodra (2/3)
2007	Damm (4/4); Paes (7/13)	B. Bryan (6/39); M. Bryan (6/39)	B. Bryan (7/39); M. Bryan (7/39)	B. Bryan (8/39); M. Bryan (8/39)	Santoro (3/3); Zimonjić (3/15)	Bhupathi (11/16); Vízner (1/1)	Erlich (1/2); A. Ram (1/3)	B. Bryan (9/39); M. Bryan (9/39)	B. Bryan (10/39); M. Bryan (10/39)
2008	Erlich (2/2); A. Ram (2/3)	B. Bryan (11/39); M. Bryan (11/39)	Nadal (1/3); Robredo (1/1)	Nestor (17/28); Zimonjić (4/15)	B. Bryan (12/39); M. Bryan (12/39)	Nestor (18/28); Zimonjić (5/15)	B. Bryan (13/39); M. Bryan (13/39)	Fyrstenberg (1/2); Matkowski (1/2)	Björkman (15/15); Ullyett (5/5)
				↓ Madrid ↓				↓ Shanghai ↓	
2009	Fish (1/1); Roddick (1/1)	Mirnyi (14/16); A. Ram (3/3)	Nestor (19/28); Zimonjić (6/15)	Nestor (21/28); Zimonjić (8/15)	Nestor (20/28); Zimonjić (7/15)	Bhupathi (12/16); Knowles (17/17)	Nestor (22/28); Zimonjić (9/15)	Benneteau (1/2); Tsonga (1/1)	Nestor (23/28); Zimonjić (10/15)
2010	M. López (1/3); Nadal (2/3)	Dlouhý (1/1); Paes (8/13)	Nestor (24/28); Zimonjić (11/15)	B. Bryan (15/39); M. Bryan (15/39)	B. Bryan (14/39); M. Bryan (14/39)	B. Bryan (16/39); M. Bryan (16/39)	B. Bryan (17/39); M. Bryan (17/39)	Melzer (1/1); Paes (9/13)	Bhupathi (13/16); Mirnyi (15/16)
2011	Dolgopolov (1/1); Malisse (1/1)	Bhupathi (14/16); Paes (10/13)	B. Bryan (18/39); M. Bryan (18/39)	B. Bryan (19/39); M. Bryan (19/39)	Isner (1/5); Querrey (1/1)	Llodra (3/3); Zimonjić (12/15)	Bhupathi (15/16); Paes (11/13)	Mirnyi (16/16); Nestor (25/28)	Bopanna (1/6); Qureshi (1/2)
2012	M. López (2/3); Nadal (3/3)	Paes (12/13); Štěpánek (1/2)	B. Bryan (20/39); M. Bryan (20/39)	Fyrstenberg (2/2); Matkowski (2/2)	Granollers (1/10); M. López (3/3)	B. Bryan (21/39); M. Bryan (21/39)	Lindstedt (1/1); Tecău (1/3)	Paes (13/13); Štěpánek (2/2)	Bhupathi (16/16); Bopanna (2/6)
2013	B. Bryan (22/39); M. Bryan (22/39)	Qureshi (2/2); Rojer (1/4)	Benneteau (2/2); Zimonjić (13/15)	B. Bryan (23/39); M. Bryan (23/39)	B. Bryan (24/39); M. Bryan (24/39)	Peya (1/3); Soares (1/4)	B. Bryan (25/39); M. Bryan (25/39)	Dodig (1/6); Melo (1/9)	B. Bryan (26/39); M. Bryan (26/39)
2014	B. Bryan (27/39); M. Bryan (27/39)	B. Bryan (28/39); M. Bryan (28/39)	B. Bryan (29/39); M. Bryan (29/39)	Nestor (26/28); Zimonjić (14/15)	Nestor (27/28); Zimonjić (15/15)	Peya (2/3); Soares (2/4)	B. Bryan (30/39); M. Bryan (30/39)	B. Bryan (31/39); M. Bryan (31/39)	B. Bryan (32/39); M. Bryan (32/39)
2015	Pospisil (1/1); Sock (1/4)	B. Bryan (33/39); M. Bryan (33/39)	B. Bryan (34/39); M. Bryan (34/39)	Bopanna (3/6); Mergea (1/1)	Cuevas (1/2); Marrero (1/1)	B. Bryan (35/39); M. Bryan (35/39)	Nestor (28/28); Roger-Vasselin (1/3)	Klaasen (1/2); Melo (2/9)	Dodig (2/6); Melo (3/9)
2016	Herbert (1/8); Mahut (1/7)	Herbert (2/8); Mahut (2/7)	Herbert (3/8); Mahut (3/7)	Rojer (2/4); Tecău (2/3)	B. Bryan (36/39); M. Bryan (36/39)	Dodig (3/6); Melo (4/9)	Dodig (4/6); Melo (5/9)	Isner (2/5); Sock (2/4)	Kontinen (1/3); Peers (1/4)
2017	Klaasen (2/2); R. Ram (1/6)	Kubot (1/4); Melo (6/9)	Bopanna (4/6); Cuevas (2/2)	Kubot (2/4); Melo (7/9)	Herbert (4/8); Mahut (4/7)	Herbert (5/7); Mahut (5/8)	Herbert (6/7); Mahut (6/8)	Kontinen (2/3); Peers (2/4)	Kubot (3/4); Melo (8/9)
2018	Isner (3/5); Sock (3/4)	B. Bryan (37/39); M. Bryan (37/39)	B. Bryan (38/39); M. Bryan (38/39)	Mektić (1/11); Peya (3/3)	Cabal (1/2); Farah (1/2)	Kontinen (3/3); Peers (3/4)	J. Murray (1/1); Soares (3/4)	Kubot (4/4); Melo (9/9)	Granollers (2/10); R. Ram (2/6)
2019	Mektić (2/11); Zeballos (1/9)	B. Bryan (39/39); M. Bryan (39/39)	Mektić (3/11); Škugor (1/1)	Rojer (3/4); Tecău (3/3)	Cabal (2/2); Farah (2/2)	Granollers (3/10); Zeballos (2/9)	Dodig (5/6); Polášek (1/2)	Pavić (1/9); Soares (4/4)	Herbert (7/8); Mahut (7/7)
2020	not held due to the COVID-19 pandemic				Granollers (4/10); Zeballos (3/9)	not held	Carreño Busta (1/1) de Minaur (1/1)	not held	Auger-Aliassime (1/1); Hurkacz (1/2)
2021	Peers (4/4); Polášek (2/2)	Mektić (4/11); Pavić (2/9)	Mektić (5/11); Pavić (3/9)	Granollers (5/10); Zeballos (4/9)	Mektić (6/11); Pavić (4/9)	R. Ram (3/6); Salisbury (1/3)	Granollers (6/10); Zeballos (5/9)	not held	Pütz (1/3); Venus (1/1)
2022	Isner (4/5); Sock (4/4)	Hurkacz (2/2); Isner (5/5)	R. Ram (4/6); Salisbury (2/3)	Koolhof (1/6); Skupski (1/3)	Mektić (7/11); Pavić (5/9)	Koolhof (2/6); Skupski (2/3)	R. Ram (5/6); Salisbury (3/3)	not held	Koolhof (3/6); Skupski (3/3)
2023	Bopanna (5/6); Ebden (1/2)	S. González (1/2); Roger-Vasselin (2/3)	Dodig (6/6); A. Krajicek (1/1)	(Note: Competed under no nationality due to the Russian invasion of Ukraine.) Khachanov (1/1); Rublev (1/1)	Nys (1/1); Zieliński (1/1)	Arévalo (1/5); Rojer (4/4)	M. González (1/1); Molteni (1/1)	Granollers (7/10); Zeballos (6/9)	S. González (2/2); Roger-Vasselin (3/3)
2024	Koolhof (4/6); Mektić (8/11)	Bopanna (6/6); Ebden (2/2)	Gillé (1/1); Vliegen (1/1)	S. Korda (1/1); Thompson (1/1)	Granollers (8/10); Zeballos (7/9)	Granollers (9/10); Zeballos (8/9)	Arévalo (2/5); Pavić (6/9)	Koolhof (5/6); Mektić (9/11)	Koolhof (6/6); Mektić (10/11)
2025	Arévalo (3/5); Pavić (7/9)	Arévalo (4/5); Pavić (8/9)	Arneodo (1/1); Guinard (1/2)	Granollers (10/10); Zeballos (9/9)	Arévalo (5/5); Pavić (9/9)	Cash (1/1); Glasspool (1/1)	Mektić (11/11); R. Ram (6/6)	Krawietz (1/2); Pütz (2/3)	Heliövaara (1/2); Patten (1/2)
2026	Andreozzi (1/1); Guinard (2/2)	Bolelli (1/2); Vavassori (1/2)	Krawietz (2/2); Pütz (3/3)	Heliövaara (2/2); Patten (2/2)	Bolelli (2/2); Vavassori (2/2)	Luz (1/1); Matos (1/1)	Luz (2/2); Matos (2/2)	Miedler (1/1); Oberleitner (1/1)	Halys (1/1); Herbert (8/8)
Year	Indian Wells	Miami	Monte Carlo	Madrid	Rome	Canada	Cincinnati	Shanghai	Paris

Seasons' tournaments are listed in chronological order with a few exceptions:
a) Cincinnati and Canada were switched in 1996.
b) Rome was held before Madrid/Hamburg from 2000 to 2010 and after Cincinnati in 2020.
c) Indian Wells was held after Cincinnati in 2021.

== Title leaders ==
- **CA** (Canadian Open)
- **CI** (Cincinnati Open)
- **HA** (Hamburg Open)
- **IT** (Italian Open)
- **IW** (Indian Wells Open)
- **MA** (Madrid Open)
- **MC** (Monte-Carlo Masters)
- **MI** (Miami Open)
- **PA** (Paris Masters)
- **SH** (Shanghai Masters)
- **SM** (Stuttgart Masters)
- **ST** (Stockholm Open)

Active events	Defunct events

* Active players and most titles won per tournament are denoted in bold.

Titles	Player	IW	MI	MC	MA	IT	CA	CI	SH	PA	ST	EU	HA	Years
39	Bob Bryan	2	**6***	**6***	**5***	**4***	**5***	**5***	1	**4***	-	-	1	2002–2019
39	Mike Bryan	2	**6***	**6***	**5***	**4***	**5***	**5***	1	**4***	-	-	1	2002–2019
28	Daniel Nestor	**4***	1	2	**5***	**4***	2	**5***	1	1	-	-	**3***	1996–2015
18	Todd Woodbridge	1	4	2	-	-	-	4	-	1	**3***	1	2	1992–2003
17	Mark Knowles	**4***	1	-	3	2	2	3	-	-	-	-	2	1993–2009
16	Max Mirnyi	-	4	2	1	1	1	2	1	2	-	1	1	2000–2011
16	Mahesh Bhupathi	-	1	1	1	2	**5***	2	-	3	-	-	1	1997–2012
15	Jonas Björkman	1	2	3	-	-	1	3	-	2	-	1	2	1998–2008
15	Nenad Zimonjić	-	-	5	2	3	2	1	-	1	-	-	1	2004–2014
14	Mark Woodforde	1	4	-	-	-	-	4	-	-	**3***	1	1	1989–2000
13	Leander Paes	1	3	1	-	1	2	2	2	1	-	-	-	1997–2012
11	**Nikola Mektić**^{*}	2	1	2	1	2	-	1	1	1	-	-	-	2018–2025
10	Paul Haarhuis	-	1	2	-	1	1	-	-	3	-	1	1	1993–1998
10	**Marcel Granollers**^{*}	-	-	-	2	3	2	1	1	1	-	-	-	2012–2025
9	**Marcelo Melo**^{*}	-	1	-	1	-	1	1	**3***	2	-	-	-	2013–2018
9	**Horacio Zeballos**^{*}	1	-	-	2	2	2	1	1	-	-	-	-	2019–2025
9	**Mate Pavić**^{*}	1	2	1	-	3	-	1	1	-	-	-	-	2019–2025
8	Jacco Eltingh	-	1	2	-	1	-	-	-	3	-	1	-	1993–1998
8	**Pierre-Hugues Herbert**^{*}	1	1	1	-	1	1	1	-	2	-	-	-	2016–2026
7	Yevgeny Kafelnikov	2	-	1	-	2	1	-	-	-	-	-	1	1994–2003
7	Nicolas Mahut	1	1	1	-	1	1	1	-	1	-	-	-	2016–2019
6	Wayne Ferreira	2	1	1	-	1	-	-	-	-	-	-	1	1991–2003
6	Ivan Dodig	-	-	1	-	-	1	2	1	1	-	-	-	2013–2023
6	Rohan Bopanna	1	1	1	1	-	-	-	-	2	-	-	-	2011–2024
6	Wesley Koolhof	1	-	-	1	-	1	-	1	2	-	-	-	2022–2024
6	**Rajeev Ram**^{*}	1	-	1	-	-	1	2	-	1	-	-	-	2017–2025
**Titles**	**Player**	**IW**	**MI**	**MC**	**MA**	**IT**	**CA**	**CI**	**SH**	**PA**	**ST**	**EU**	**HA**	**Years**

- Players with 6+ titles. Active players and tournament records indicated in **bold**.
- 186 champions in 325 events as of **2026 Paris**.

== Career Golden Masters ==
The achievement of winning all of the nine active ATP Masters 1000 tournaments over the course of a player's career.

- The event at which the Career Golden Masters was accomplished indicated in **bold**.

Player	Indian Wells (hard)	Miami (hard)	Monte Carlo (clay)	Madrid (clay)	Italy (clay)	Canada (hard)	Cincinnati (hard)	Shanghai (hard)	Paris (hard indoor)
Daniel Nestor (Note: They additionally won the previously held Madrid Masters on indoors and the Hamburg Masters on clay.)	1997	2002	2009	2009	1997	2000	1996	**2011***	2009
Bob Bryan	2013	2007	2007	2010	2008	2002	2003	**2014***	2005
Mike Bryan	2013	2007	2007	2010	2008	2002	2003	**2014***	2005

== Career totals ==
- Active players denoted in **bold**.

Doubles
No.	Titles
39	(United States) Bob Bryan
39	(United States) Mike Bryan
28	(Canada) Daniel Nestor
18	(Australia) Todd Woodbridge
17	(The Bahamas) Mark Knowles
16	(Belarus) Max Mirnyi
16	(India) Mahesh Bhupathi
15	(Sweden) Jonas Björkman
15	(Serbia) Nenad Zimonjić
14	(Australia) Mark Woodforde

No.	Finals
59	Bob Bryan
59	Mike Bryan
47	Daniel Nestor
30	Mahesh Bhupathi
29	Mark Knowles
29	Max Mirnyi
28	Nenad Zimonjić
26	Todd Woodbridge
25	Jonas Björkman
21	Paul Haarhuis

No.	Semifinals
86	Mike Bryan
85	Bob Bryan
79	Daniel Nestor
58	Max Mirnyi
54	Jonas Björkman
51	Mark Knowles
50	Mahesh Bhupathi
43	Todd Woodbridge
41	Nenad Zimonjić
36	Leander Paes

No.	Quarterfinals
127	Daniel Nestor
121	Mike Bryan
120	Bob Bryan
89	Mark Knowles
85	Max Mirnyi
79	Jonas Björkman
71	Nenad Zimonjić
70	Mahesh Bhupathi
65	Todd Woodbridge
62	Leander Paes

No.	Match wins
341	Mike Bryan
338	Bob Bryan
329	Daniel Nestor
238	Max Mirnyi
234	Mark Knowles
209	Jonas Björkman
190	Mahesh Bhupathi
190	Nenad Zimonjić
174	**Marcel Granollers**
169	Todd Woodbridge

%	W–L	Match record
73.2	338–124	Bob Bryan
72.7	341–128	Mike Bryan
71.3	169–68	Todd Woodbridge
69.7	124–54	Paul Haarhuis
68.5	209–96	Jonas Björkman
67.9	142–67	**Mate Pavić**
66.3	108–55	**Horacio Zeballos**
65.0	329–177	Daniel Nestor
63.2	110–64	**Nikola Mektić**
63.0	238–140	Max Mirnyi
minimum 100 wins

Statistics correct as of 2026 Paris. To avoid double counting, they should be updated at the conclusion of a tournament or when the player's participation has ended.

== Season records ==
No.	Titles in a season	Year	
6	Bob Bryan; Mike Bryan	2014	
5	Bob Bryan; Mike Bryan	2	2007, 13
5	Daniel Nestor; Nenad Zimonjić	2009	
4	Max Mirnyi	2003	
4	Bob Bryan; Mike Bryan	2010	
minimum 4 titles

No.	Finals	Year(s)	
7	Bob Bryan; Mike Bryan	2	2007, 14
6	Bob Bryan; Mike Bryan	2013	
5	Bob Bryan; Mike Bryan	2	2006, 08
5	Max Mirnyi	2003	
5	Daniel Nestor; Nenad Zimonjić	2009	
5	Łukasz Kubot; Marcelo Melo	2017	
5	Nikola Mektić; Mate Pavić	2021	
minimum 5 finals

No.	Match wins	Year	
30	Bob Bryan; Mike Bryan	2014	
29	Bob Bryan; Mike Bryan	2007	
28	Marcelo Arévalo; Mate Pavić	2025	
26	Mark Knowles; Daniel Nestor	2002	
26	Bob Bryan; Mike Bryan	2013	
24	Max Mirnyi	2	2003, 06
24	Jonas Björkman	2006	
minimum 24 wins

%	W–L	Match record	Year
90.9	30–3	Bob Bryan; Mike Bryan	2014
87.9	29–4	Bob Bryan; Mike Bryan	2007
86.7	26–4	Bob Bryan; Mike Bryan	2013
84.8	28–5	Marcelo Arévalo; Mate Pavić	2025
84.0	21–4	Daniel Nestor; Nenad Zimonjić	2009
82.8	24–5	Max Mirnyi	2003

== Consecutive records ==
No.	Consecutive titles	Years	
4	Bob Bryan; Mike Bryan	3	2010, 13–14
3	Bob Bryan; Mike Bryan	2	2007, 14
3	Pierre-Hugues Herbert; Nicolas Mahut	2	2016–17
3	Jonas Björkman	1999	
3	Daniel Nestor; Nenad Zimonjić	2009	

No.	Consecutive finals	Years	
5	Bob Bryan; Mike Bryan	2013–14	
5	Nikola Mektić; Mate Pavić	2021	
4	Bob Bryan; Mike Bryan	4	2007–08, 10, 18
4	Nicolas Mahut	2017	

No.	Match win streak	Years
21	Bob Bryan; Mike Bryan	2013–14
18	Bob Bryan; Mike Bryan	2010
15	Pierre-Hugues Herbert; Nicolas Mahut	2016 (Note: Streak includes a walkover.)
14	Jonas Björkman	1999
14	Bob Bryan; Mike Bryan	2014
14	Marcel Granollers; Horacio Zeballos	2024
13	Daniel Nestor; Nenad Zimonjić	2009
13	Pierre-Hugues Herbert; Nicolas Mahut	2017 (Note: Streak spans across non-consecutive events.)
13	John Isner	2022

== Tournament records ==
=== Most titles per tournament ===
Active
Masters	No.	Player	Years
Indian Wells	4	Daniel Nestor	1997–2006
Miami	6	Bob Bryan; Mike Bryan	2007–19
Monte Carlo	6	Bob Bryan; Mike Bryan	2007–18
Madrid	5	Daniel Nestor	2002–14
Madrid	5	Bob Bryan; Mike Bryan	2006–13
Rome	4	Daniel Nestor	2001–14
Rome	4	Bob Bryan; Mike Bryan	2008–16
Canada	5	Mahesh Bhupathi	1997–2009
Canada	5	Bob Bryan; Mike Bryan	2002–15
Cincinnati	5	Daniel Nestor	1996–2015
Cincinnati	5	Bob Bryan; Mike Bryan	2003–14
Shanghai	3	Marcelo Melo	2013–18
Paris	4	Bob Bryan; Mike Bryan	2005–14

Discontinued
Masters	No.	Player	Years
Hamburg	3	Daniel Nestor	1996–2008
Stuttgart	2	Sébastien Lareau	1996–98
Stockholm	3	Todd Woodbridge; Mark Woodforde	1992–94

=== Tournaments won with no sets dropped ===
No.	Player	Events
5	Bob Bryan; Mike Bryan	Cincinnati (2003), Miami (2014), Monte Carlo (2007, 2011, 2012)
5	Marcel Granollers	Rome (2012, 2024), Paris (2018); Cincinnati (2021), Madrid (2025)
4	Jonas Björkman	Canada (1999), Cincinnati (1999), Miami (2006), Monte Carlo (2006)
4	Max Mirnyi	Stuttgart (2001), Canada (2003), Miami (2006), Monte Carlo (2006)
4	Mate Pavić	Shanghai (2019), Miami (2021), Rome (2021), Indian Wells (2025)
3	Todd Woodbridge; Mark Woodforde	Miami (1995, 1996, 1997)
3	Horacio Zeballos	Cincinnati (2021), Rome (2024), Madrid (2025)
2	Grant Connell; Patrick Galbraith	Indian Wells (1994), Paris (1995)
2	Yevgeny Kafelnikov	Hamburg (1995), Canada (1995)
2	Mahesh Bhupathi	Paris (1998), Canada (2003)
2	Leander Paes	Paris (1998), Monte Carlo (2005)
2	Nenad Zimonjić	Monte Carlo (2005), Madrid (2014)
2	Marc López	Indian Wells (2012), Rome (2012)
2	Bruno Soares	Canada (2014), Shanghai (2019)
2	Nikola Mektić	Miami (2021), Rome (2021)
1	Wayne Ferreira	Hamburg (1995)
1	Andrei Olhovskiy	Canada (1995)
1	Jacco Eltingh; Paul Haarhuis	Stuttgart (1995 (Note: The first edition of Stuttgart was played in Essen.))
1	Olivier Delaître; Tim Henman	Monte Carlo (1999)
1	Patrick Rafter	Canada (1999)
1	Byron Black	Cincinnati (1999)
1	Sébastien Lareau; Alex O'Brien	Paris (1999)

No.	Player	Events
1
1	Sandon Stolle	Stuttgart (2001)
1	Martin Damm; Cyril Suk	Rome (2002)
1	Nicolas Escudé; Fabrice Santoro	Paris (2002)
1	Wayne Arthurs; Paul Hanley	Rome (2003)
1	Jonathan Erlich; Andy Ram	Indian Wells (2008)
1	Rafael Nadal	Indian Wells (2012)
1	Daniel Nestor	Madrid (2014)
1	Alexander Peya	Canada (2014)
1	Jean-Julien Rojer; Horia Tecău	Madrid (2016)
1	Łukasz Kubot; Marcelo Melo	Madrid (2017)
1	John Isner; Jack Sock	Indian Wells (2018)
1	Rajeev Ram	Paris (2018)
1	Pierre-Hugues Herbert; Nicolas Mahut	Paris (2019)
1	Hugo Nys; Jan Zieliński	Rome (2023)
1	Marcelo Arévalo	Indian Wells (2025)
1	Lucas Miedler; Neil Oberleitner	Shanghai (2026)

=== Tournaments won on different surfaces ===
Doubles
No.	Player	Events
12	Bob Bryan	Indian Wells (hard), Miami (hard), Monte Carlo (clay), Hamburg (clay), Madrid (clay), Rome (clay), Cincinnati (hard), Canada (hard), Madrid (hard), Shanghai (hard), Paris (carpet), Paris (hard)
12	Mike Bryan	Indian Wells (hard), Miami (hard), Monte Carlo (clay), Hamburg (clay), Madrid (clay), Rome (clay), Cincinnati (hard), Canada (hard), Madrid (hard), Shanghai (hard), Paris (carpet), Paris (hard)
11	Daniel Nestor	Indian Wells (hard), Miami (hard), Monte Carlo (clay), Hamburg (clay), Madrid (clay), Rome (clay), Cincinnati (hard), Canada (hard), Madrid (hard), Shanghai (hard), Paris (hard)
11	(Belarus) Max Mirnyi	Miami (hard), Monte Carlo (clay), Hamburg (clay), Rome (clay), Cincinnati (hard), Canada (hard), Madrid (hard), Shanghai (hard), Stuttgart (hard), Paris (carpet), Paris (hard)

== Calendar title combinations ==
- **Back-to-back** tournament titles.
- Currently active combinations in **bold.**

=== Four consecutive ===
Combination	Winner	Year
Madrid—Rome—Canada—Cincinnati	Mike Bryan; Bob Bryan	2010

=== Three consecutive ===
Combination	Winners	Year
Indian Wells—Miami—Monte Carlo	Mike Bryan; Bob Bryan	2014
Indian Wells—Miami—Monte Carlo	Pierre-Hugues Herbert; Nicolas Mahut	2016
Monte Carlo—Madrid—Rome	Daniel Nestor; Nenad Zimonjić	2009

=== Two consecutive ===
Combination	Winners	Year(s)	
Indian Wells—Miami "Sunshine double"	Mark Woodforde; Todd Woodbridge	1996	
Indian Wells—Miami "Sunshine double"	Wayne Black; Sandon Stolle	1999	
Indian Wells—Miami "Sunshine double"	Mark Knowles; Daniel Nestor	2002	
Indian Wells—Miami "Sunshine double"	Mike Bryan; Bob Bryan	2014	
Indian Wells—Miami "Sunshine double"	Pierre-Hugues Herbert; Nicolas Mahut	2016	
Indian Wells—Miami "Sunshine double"	John Isner	2022	
Indian Wells—Miami "Sunshine double"	Marcelo Arévalo; Mate Pavić	2025	
Madrid—Rome	Daniel Nestor; Nenad Zimonjić	2	2009, 14
Madrid—Rome	Mike Bryan; Bob Bryan	2	2010, 13
Canada—Cincinnati	Jonas Björkman	1999	
Canada—Cincinnati	Mike Bryan; Bob Bryan	2010	
Canada—Cincinnati	Ivan Dodig; Marcelo Melo	2016	
Canada—Cincinnati	Pierre-Hugues Herbert; Nicolas Mahut	2017	
Canada—Cincinnati	Orlando Luz; Rafael Matos	2026	
Shanghai—Paris (Note: Stockholm (1990–1994) and Madrid (2002–2008) preceded Shanghai as the 8th Masters event until 2008. In 2009, Madrid was moved to the clay season.) (Stockholm/Madrid)	Mike Bryan; Bob Bryan	2	2007, 14
Shanghai—Paris (Stockholm/Madrid)	John Fitzgerald; Anders Järryd	1991	
Shanghai—Paris (Stockholm/Madrid)	Marcelo Melo	2015	
Shanghai—Paris (Stockholm/Madrid)	Wesley Koolhof; Nikola Mektić	2024	

== Title defence ==
- Note: Currently active tournaments in **bold.**

**Hardcourt**

Tournament	Player(s)	Consecutive titles	
Indian Wells	Mark Knowles; Daniel Nestor	2	2005–06
Indian Wells	Bob Bryan; Mike Bryan	2	2013–14
Miami	Todd Woodbridge; Mark Woodforde	3	1995–97
Miami	Leander Paes	3	2010–12
Miami	Jonas Björkman; Max Mirnyi	2	2005–06
Miami	Bob Bryan; Mike Bryan	2	2007–08
Miami	Bob Bryan; Mike Bryan	2	2014–15
Miami	Bob Bryan; Mike Bryan	2	2018–19
Canada	Patrick Galbraith	2	1991–92
Canada	Mahesh Bhupathi	2	2003–04
Canada	Alexander Peya; Bruno Soares	2	2013–14
Cincinnati	Jonas Björkman; Max Mirnyi	2	2005–06
Cincinnati	Bob Bryan; Mike Bryan	2	2013–14
Paris	Jacco Eltingh; Paul Haarhuis	2	1996–97
Paris	Rohan Bopanna	2	2011–12
Paris	Bob Bryan; Mike Bryan	2	2013–14
Stockholm	Todd Woodbridge; Mark Woodforde	3	1992–94
Madrid (Note: Madrid (2002–2008) was played on hardcourt.)	Mark Knowles; Daniel Nestor	2	2004–05
Madrid	Bob Bryan; Mike Bryan	2	2006–07

**Clay**

Tournament	Player(s)	Consecutive titles	
Monte Carlo	Jonas Björkman; Todd Woodbridge	2	2001–02
Monte Carlo	Nenad Zimonjić	2	2004–05
Monte Carlo	Nenad Zimonjić	2	2009–10
Monte Carlo	Daniel Nestor	2	2009–10
Monte Carlo	Bob Bryan; Mike Bryan	2	2011–12
Monte Carlo	Bob Bryan; Mike Bryan	2	2014–15
Monte Carlo	Nikola Mektić	2	2019–21 (Note: Monte Carlo was not held in 2020 due to the Covid-19 pandemic.)
Madrid	Bob Bryan; Mike Bryan	2	2010–11
Rome	Juan Sebastián Cabal; Robert Farah	2	2018–19
Rome	Nikola Mektić; Mate Pavić	2	2021–22
Hamburg (Note: Hamburg (1990–2008) was held on clay.)	Sergio Casal; Emilio Sánchez	2	1991–92
Hamburg	Todd Woodbridge	2	2000–01

- The Bryans have retained a record seven different tournaments, except Rome and Canada, on a record ten occasions.

== Statistics ==
=== Seeds statistics ===
==== No. 1 vs. No. 2 seeds in final ====
W The top seeds won the final.
L The second seeds won the final.

Year	Event	Top seeds	W/L	Second seeds
1994	Indian Wells	Byron Black; Jonathan Stark	L	Grant Connell; Patrick Galbraith
1994	Paris	Jacco Eltingh; Paul Haarhuis	W	Byron Black; Jonathan Stark
1999	Paris	Sébastien Lareau; Alex O'Brien	W	Paul Haarhuis; Jared Palmer
2001	Hamburg	Jonas Björkman; Todd Woodbridge	W	Daniel Nestor; Sandon Stolle
2002	Miami	Donald Johnson; Jared Palmer	L	Mark Knowles; Daniel Nestor
2002	Madrid	Mark Knowles; Daniel Nestor	W	Mahesh Bhupathi; Max Mirnyi
2003	Hamburg	Mark Knowles; Daniel Nestor	W	Mahesh Bhupathi; Max Mirnyi
2004	Madrid	Mark Knowles; Daniel Nestor	W	Bob Bryan; Mike Bryan
2006	Miami	Bob Bryan; Mike Bryan	L	Jonas Björkman; Max Mirnyi
2006	Cincinnati	Bob Bryan; Mike Bryan	L	Jonas Björkman; Max Mirnyi
2007	Paris	Bob Bryan; Mike Bryan	W	Daniel Nestor; Nenad Zimonjić
2008	Rome	Bob Bryan; Mike Bryan	W	Daniel Nestor; Nenad Zimonjić
2008	Hamburg	Bob Bryan; Mike Bryan	L	Daniel Nestor; Nenad Zimonjić
2008	Canada	Bob Bryan; Mike Bryan	L	Daniel Nestor; Nenad Zimonjić

Year	Event	Top seeds	W/L	Second seeds
2009	Monte Carlo	Bob Bryan; Mike Bryan	L	Daniel Nestor; Nenad Zimonjić
2009	Rome	Bob Bryan; Mike Bryan	W	Daniel Nestor; Nenad Zimonjić
2009	Cincinnati	Bob Bryan; Mike Bryan	L	Daniel Nestor; Nenad Zimonjić
2010	Madrid	Daniel Nestor; Nenad Zimonjić	L	Bob Bryan; Mike Bryan
2012	Monte Carlo	Bob Bryan; Mike Bryan	W	Max Mirnyi; Daniel Nestor
2013	Cincinnati	Bob Bryan; Mike Bryan	W	Marcel Granollers; Marc López
2013	Paris	Bob Bryan; Mike Bryan	W	Alexander Peya; Bruno Soares
2014	Indian Wells	Bob Bryan; Mike Bryan	W	Alexander Peya; Bruno Soares
2015	Miami	Bob Bryan; Mike Bryan	W	Vasek Pospisil; Jack Sock
2017	Shanghai	Henri Kontinen; John Peers	W	Łukasz Kubot; Marcelo Melo
2024	Miami	Rohan Bopanna; Matthew Ebden	W	Ivan Dodig; Austin Krajicek

==== Top 4 seeds in semifinals ====
- Tournament winners in **bold.**

Year	Event	Seeds			
1994	Paris	1. **Jacco Eltingh**; 1. **Paul Haarhuis**	2. Byron Black; 2. Jonathan Stark	3. Grant Connell; 3. Patrick Galbraith	4. Mark Woodforde; 4. Todd Woodbridge
2002	Madrid	1. **Mark Knowles**; 1. **Daniel Nestor**	2. Mahesh Bhupathi; 2. Max Mirnyi	3. Jonas Björkman; 3. Todd Woodbridge	4. Bob Bryan; 4. Mike Bryan
2006	Madrid	1. **Bob Bryan**; 1. **Mike Bryan**	2. Jonas Björkman; 2. Max Mirnyi	3. Mark Knowles; 3. Daniel Nestor	4. Paul Hanley; 4. Kevin Ullyett
2008	Cincinnati	1. **Bob Bryan**; 1. **Mike Bryan**	2. Daniel Nestor; 2. Nenad Zimonjić	3. Jonathan Erlich; 3. Andy Ram	4. Mahesh Bhupathi; 4. Mark Knowles
2017	Shanghai	1. **Henri Kontinen**; 1. **John Peers**	2. Łukasz Kubot; 2. Marcelo Melo	3. Jean-Julien Rojer; 3. Horia Tecău	4. Jamie Murray; 4. Bruno Soares

==== Top 8 seeds in quarterfinals ====
- Tournament winners in **bold.**

Year	Event	Seeds			
2006	Hamburg	1. Bob Bryan; 1. Mike Bryan	2. Jonas Björkman; 2. Max Mirnyi	3. Mark Knowles; 3. Daniel Nestor	4. **Paul Hanley**; 4. **Kevin Ullyett**
2006	Hamburg	5. Fabrice Santoro; 5. Nenad Zimonjić	6. Jonathan Erlich; 6. Andy Ram	7. Simon Aspelin; 7. Todd Perry	8. Leoš Friedl; 8. Pavel Vízner
2009	Rome	1. Bob Bryan; 1. Mike Bryan	2. **Daniel Nestor**; 2. **Nenad Zimonjić**	3. Lukáš Dlouhý; 3. Leander Paes	4. Mahesh Bhupathi; 4. Mark Knowles
2009	Rome	5. Bruno Soares; 5. Kevin Ullyett	6. Mariusz Fyrstenberg; 6. Marcin Matkowski	7. Max Mirnyi; 7. Andy Ram	8. Jeff Coetzee; 8. Jordan Kerr

==== Qualifiers in final ====
W Qualifiers won the final.
L Qualifiers lost the final.

Year	Event	Qualifiers	W/L	Opponents
1994	Monte Carlo	Nicklas Kulti; Magnus Larsson	W	Yevgeny Kafelnikov; Daniel Vacek

=== Age statistics ===
**Youngest winners**
Age	Winner	First title
19 years, 191 days	Wayne Ferreira	1991 Miami
19 years, 249 days	Goran Ivanišević	1991 Rome
19 years, 270 days	Jim Courier	1990 Hamburg
20 years, 87 days	Yevgeny Kafelnikov	1994 Rome
20 years, 92 days	Félix Auger-Aliassime	2020 Paris

**Oldest winners**
Age	Winner	Last title
44 years, 26 days	Rohan Bopanna	2024 Miami
42 years, 353 days	Daniel Nestor	2015 Cincinnati
41 years, 353 days	Jean-Julien Rojer	2023 Canada
41 years, 152 days	Rajeev Ram	2025 Cincinnati
40 years, 336 days	Bob Bryan	2019 Miami
40 years, 336 days	Mike Bryan	2019 Miami

=== All countrymen in final ===
Year	Event	Winner	Runner-up
1992	Miami	Ken Flach; Todd Witsken	Kent Kinnear; Sven Salumaa
1997	Cincinnati	Mark Woodforde; Todd Woodbridge	Mark Philippoussis; Patrick Rafter
2000	Hamburg	Mark Woodforde; Todd Woodbridge	Wayne Arthurs; Sandon Stolle
2010	Rome	Bob Bryan; Mike Bryan	John Isner; Sam Querrey
2011	Rome	John Isner; Sam Querrey	Mardy Fish; Andy Roddick
2018	Indian Wells	John Isner; Jack Sock	Bob Bryan; Mike Bryan
2025	Canada	(United Kingdom) Julian Cash (United Kingdom) Lloyd Glasspool	(United Kingdom) Joe Salisbury (United Kingdom) Neal Skupski

== Titles won by decade ==
as of 2026 Paris.

=== 1990s ===
11	**Woodbridge, Woodforde**

10	Haarhuis

8	Eltingh

6	Knowles

5	B. Black, Galbraith, Nestor

4	Björkman, O'Brien

3	Bhupathi, Casal, Connell, Courier, E. Ferreira, Forget, Kafelnikov, P. Korda, Lareau, Leach, Paes, E. Sánchez, Stolle

2	Becker, W. Black, W. Ferreira, Fitzgerald, Flach, Hlasek, Järryd, Johnson, Montana, Norval, Rafter, J. Sánchez, Siemerink, Stark, Witsken

1	Agassi, Annacone, Arthurs, Bruguera, Cahill, Camporese, Damm, Davis, Delaître, DeVries, Edberg, Grabb, Henman, Ho, Ivanišević, Jensen, Koevermans, R. Krajicek, A. Kratzmann, M. Kratzmann, Kulti, Larsson, Leconte, Lobo, Macpherson, J. McEnroe, P. McEnroe, Melville, Olhovskiy, Pate, Pugh, Rikl, Rosset, Seguso, Šmíd, Steven, Stich, Suk, Vacek, Visser, Warder, Wheaton

=== 2000s ===
18	**Nestor**

14	Mirnyi

13	B. Bryan, M. Bryan

11	Björkman, Knowles

10	Zimonjić

9	Bhupathi

7	Woodbridge

5	Ullyett

4	W. Ferreira, Kafelnikov, Paes

3	W. Black, Damm, Hanley, Novák, A. Ram, Rikl, Santoro, Woodforde

2	Arthurs, Clément, Erlich, Llodra

1	Benneteau, Blake, E. Ferreira, Escudé, Federer, Fish, Fyrstenberg, Gambill, Grosjean, Henman, Hrbatý, Kulti, Lareau, Leach, Martin, Matkowski, Nadal, O'Brien, Palmer, Robredo, Roddick, Stolle, Suk, Tsonga, Vízner

=== 2010s ===
26	**B. Bryan, M. Bryan**

9	Melo

7	Herbert, Mahut

6	Paes

5	Dodig, Nestor, Zimonjić

4	Bhupathi, Bopanna, Kubot, Soares

3	Granollers, Isner, Kontinen, López, Mektić, Peers, Peya, Rojer, Sock, Tecău

2	Cabal, Cuevas, Farah, Klaasen, Mirnyi, Nadal, Qureshi, R. Ram, Štěpánek, Zeballos

1	Benneteau, Dlouhý, Dolgopolov, Fyrstenberg, Lindstedt, Llodra, Malisse, Marrero, Matkowski, Melzer, Mergea, Murray, Pavić, Polášek, Pospisil, Querrey, Roger-Vasselin, Škugor

=== 2020s ===
8	**Mektić, Pavić**

7	Granollers, Zeballos

6	Koolhof

5	Arévalo

4	R. Ram

3	Pütz, Salisbury, Skupski

2	Bolelli, Bopanna, Ebden, S. González, Guinard, Heliövaara, Hurkacz, Isner, Krawietz, Luz, Matos, Patten, Roger-Vasselin, Vavassori

1	Andreozzi, Arneodo, Auger-Aliassime, Carreño Busta, Cash, de Minaur, Dodig, Gillé, Glasspool, M. González, Halys, Herbert, Khachanov, S. Korda, A. Krajicek, Miedler, Molteni, Nys, Oberleitner, Peers, Polášek, Rojer, Rublev, Sock, Thompson, Venus, Vliegen, Zieliński

== Titles won by country ==
Note: Titles, won by a team of players from same country, count as one title, not two.

as of 2026 Paris.

90	United States (36 players)

41	Australia (16 players)

33	Canada (5 players)

32	Netherlands (7 players)

27	Croatia (4 players), India (3 players)

24	France (15 players)

20	Spain (10 players), Sweden (6 players)

17	Bahamas (1 player)

16	Belarus (1 player), Czech Republic (10 players)

15	Brazil (4 players), Serbia (1 player)

14	South Africa (5 players)

12	Argentina (5 players), Great Britain (7 players), Zimbabwe (3 players)

10	Poland (6 players)

8	Russia (2 players) (Note: Not including Karen Khachanov and Andrey Rublev's title win at Madrid in 2023.)

6	Germany (4 players)

5	Austria (4 players), El Salvador (1 player), Finland (2 players), Israel (2 players)

4	Romania (2 players), Switzerland (3 players)

3	Italy (3 players), Slovakia (2 players)

2	Belgium (3 players), Colombia (2 players), Mexico (1 player), Monaco (2 players), Pakistan (1 player). Uruguay (1 player)

1	Ukraine

== See also ==
**ATP Tour**

- ATP Tour Masters 1000
- Tennis Masters Series singles records and statistics
- Grand Prix Super Series

**WTA Tour**

- WTA 1000
- WTA 1000 Series singles records and statistics
- WTA 1000 Series doubles records and statistics
- WTA Premier Mandatory and Premier 5
- WTA Tier I tournaments
