= 2008 ATP Masters Series =

Men's professional tennis tour

2008 ATP Masters 1000
Details
- Duration: March 10 – November 2
- Edition: 19th
- Tournaments: 9

Achievements (singles)
- Most titles: (Spain) Rafael Nadal (3)
- Most finals: (Spain) Rafael Nadal (3)

The ATP Masters Series are part of the elite tour for professional men's tennis organized by the Association of Tennis Professionals called the ATP Tour.

== Tournaments ==
Tournament	Country	Location	Current Venue	Began	Court surface
Indian Wells Masters	United States	Indian Wells	Indian Wells Tennis Garden	1974	Hard
Miami Masters	United States	Miami	Tennis Center at Crandon Park	1985	Hard
Monte Carlo Masters	Monaco	Roquebrune-Cap-Martin, France	Monte Carlo Country Club	1897	Clay
Rome Masters	Italy	Rome	Foro Italico	1930	Clay
Hamburg Masters	Germany	Hamburg	Am Rothenbaum	1892	Clay
Canada Masters	Canada	Toronto	Rexall Centre	1881	Hard
Cincinnati Masters	United States	Mason, Ohio	Lindner Family Tennis Center	1899	Hard
Madrid Masters	Spain	Madrid	Madrid Arena	2002	Hard (i)
Paris Masters	France	Paris	Palais Omnisports de Paris-Bercy	1968	Hard (i)

Note: Although the Monte Carlo Masters is billed as taking place in Monte Carlo, it is actually held in Roquebrune-Cap-Martin, a commune of France adjacent to Monaco.

== Results ==
* First-time champion

Masters	Singles champions	Runners-up	Score	Doubles champions	Runners-up	Score
Indian Wells Singles – Doubles	(Serbia) Novak Djokovic	(United States) Mardy Fish	6–2, 5–7, 6–3	(Israel) Jonathan Erlich (Israel) Andy Ram	(Canada) Daniel Nestor (Serbia) Nenad Zimonjić	6–4, 6–4
Miami Singles – Doubles	(Russia) Nikolay Davydenko	(Spain) Rafael Nadal	6–4, 6–2	(United States) Bob Bryan (United States) Mike Bryan	(India) Mahesh Bhupathi (The Bahamas) Mark Knowles	6–2, 6–2
Monte Carlo Singles – Doubles	(Spain) Rafael Nadal	(Switzerland) Roger Federer	7–5, 7–5	(Spain) Rafael Nadal* (Spain) Tommy Robredo*	(India) Mahesh Bhupathi (The Bahamas) Mark Knowles	6–3, 6–3
Rome Singles – Doubles	(Serbia) Novak Djokovic	(Switzerland) Stan Wawrinka	4–6, 6–3, 6–3	(United States) Bob Bryan (United States) Mike Bryan	(Canada) Daniel Nestor (Serbia) Nenad Zimonjić	3–6, 6–4, [10–8]
Hamburg Singles – Doubles	(Spain) Rafael Nadal	(Switzerland) Roger Federer	7–5, 6–7^{(3–7)}, 6–3	(Canada) Daniel Nestor (Serbia) Nenad Zimonjić	(United States) Bob Bryan (United States) Mike Bryan	4–6, 7–5, [10–8]
Toronto Singles – Doubles	(Spain) Rafael Nadal	(Germany) Nicolas Kiefer	6–3, 6–2	(Canada) Daniel Nestor (Serbia) Nenad Zimonjić	(United States) Bob Bryan (United States) Mike Bryan	6–2, 4–6, [10–8]
Cincinnati Singles – Doubles	(United Kingdom) Andy Murray*	(Serbia) Novak Djokovic	7–6^{(7–4)}, 7–6^{(7–5)}	(United States) Bob Bryan (United States) Mike Bryan	(Israel) Jonathan Erlich (Israel) Andy Ram	4–6, 7–6^{(7–2)}, [10–7]
Madrid Singles – Doubles	(United Kingdom) Andy Murray	(France) Gilles Simon	6–4, 7–6^{(8–6)}	(Poland) Mariusz Fyrstenberg* (Poland) Marcin Matkowski*	(India) Mahesh Bhupathi (The Bahamas) Mark Knowles	6–4, 6–2
Paris Singles – Doubles	(France) Jo-Wilfried Tsonga*	(Argentina) David Nalbandian	6–3, 4–6, 6–4	(Sweden) Jonas Björkman (Zimbabwe) Kevin Ullyett	(South Africa) Jeff Coetzee (South Africa) Wesley Moodie	6–2, 6–2

== Schedule ==
Week of	Tournament	Winner	Runner-up	Singles Semi finalists	Singles Quarter finalists
10 March (2 weeks)	Indian Wells Masters (United States) Indian Wells, USA	(Serbia) Novak Djokovic; 6-2, 5-7, 6-3	(United States) Mardy Fish	(Switzerland) Roger Federer (Spain) Rafael Nadal	(Germany) Tommy Haas (Argentina) David Nalbandian (Switzerland) Stanislas Wawrinka (United States) James Blake
10 March (2 weeks)	Indian Wells Masters (United States) Indian Wells, USA	(Israel) Erlich / (Israel) Ram; 6-4, 6-4	(Canada) Nestor / (Serbia) Zimonjić	(Switzerland) Roger Federer (Spain) Rafael Nadal	(Germany) Tommy Haas (Argentina) David Nalbandian (Switzerland) Stanislas Wawrinka (United States) James Blake
24 March (2 weeks)	Miami Masters (United States) Key Biscaine, USA	(Russia) Nikolay Davydenko; 6-4, 6-2	(Spain) Rafael Nadal	(United States) Andy Roddick (Czech Republic) Tomáš Berdych	(Switzerland) Roger Federer (Serbia) Janko Tipsarević (Russia) Igor Andreev (United States) James Blake
24 March (2 weeks)	Miami Masters (United States) Key Biscaine, USA	(United States) B. Bryan / (United States) M. Bryan; 6-2, 6-2	(India) Bhupathi / (The Bahamas) Knowles	(United States) Andy Roddick (Czech Republic) Tomáš Berdych	(Switzerland) Roger Federer (Serbia) Janko Tipsarević (Russia) Igor Andreev (United States) James Blake
21 April	Monte Carlo Masters (Monaco) Roquebrune-Cap-Martin, France	(Spain) Rafael Nadal; 7-5, 7-5	(Switzerland) Roger Federer	(Serbia) Novak Djokovic (Russia) Nikolay Davydenko	(Argentina) David Nalbandian (United States) Sam Querrey (Russia) Igor Andreev (Spain) David Ferrer
21 April	Monte Carlo Masters (Monaco) Roquebrune-Cap-Martin, France	(Spain) Nadal / (Spain) Robredo; 6-3, 6-3	(India) Bhupathi / (The Bahamas) Knowles	(Serbia) Novak Djokovic (Russia) Nikolay Davydenko	(Argentina) David Nalbandian (United States) Sam Querrey (Russia) Igor Andreev (Spain) David Ferrer
5 May	Rome Masters; Rome, Italy	(Serbia) Novak Djokovic; 4-6, 6-3, 6-3	(Switzerland) Stanislas Wawrinka	(Czech Republic) Radek Štěpánek (United States) Andy Roddick	(Switzerland) Roger Federer (Spain) Nicolás Almagro (Spain) Tommy Robredo (United States) James Blake
5 May	Rome Masters; Rome, Italy	(United States) B. Bryan / (United States) M. Bryan; 3-6, 6-4, 10-8	(Canada) Nestor / (Serbia) Zimonjić	(Czech Republic) Radek Štěpánek (United States) Andy Roddick	(Switzerland) Roger Federer (Spain) Nicolás Almagro (Spain) Tommy Robredo (United States) James Blake
12 May	Hamburg Masters; Hamburg, Germany	(Spain) Rafael Nadal; 7-5, 6^{4}-7, 6-3	(Switzerland) Roger Federer	(Italy) Andreas Seppi (Serbia) Novak Djokovic	(Spain) Fernando Verdasco (Germany) Nicolas Kiefer (Spain) Albert Montañés (Spain) Carlos Moyà
12 May	Hamburg Masters; Hamburg, Germany	(Canada) Nestor / (Serbia) Zimonjić; 6-4, 5-7, 10-8	(United States) B. Bryan / (United States) M. Bryan	(Italy) Andreas Seppi (Serbia) Novak Djokovic	(Spain) Fernando Verdasco (Germany) Nicolas Kiefer (Spain) Albert Montañés (Spain) Carlos Moyà
21 July	Canada Masters; Toronto, Canada	(Spain) Rafael Nadal; 6-3, 6-2	(Germany) Nicolas Kiefer	(France) Gilles Simon (United Kingdom) Andy Murray	(Croatia) Marin Čilić (United States) James Blake (Serbia) Novak Djokovic (France) Richard Gasquet
21 July	Canada Masters; Toronto, Canada	(Canada) Nestor / (Serbia) Zimonjić; 6-2, 4-6, 10-6	(United States) B. Bryan / (United States) M. Bryan	(France) Gilles Simon (United Kingdom) Andy Murray	(Croatia) Marin Čilić (United States) James Blake (Serbia) Novak Djokovic (France) Richard Gasquet
28 July	Cincinnati Masters (United States) Mason, USA	(United Kingdom) Andy Murray; 7-6(4), 7-6(5)	(Serbia) Novak Djokovic	(Croatia) Ivo Karlović (Spain) Rafael Nadal	(Spain) Carlos Moyà (Latvia) Ernests Gulbis (Germany) Philipp Kohlschreiber (Ecuador) Nicolás Lapentti
28 July	Cincinnati Masters (United States) Mason, USA	(United States) B. Bryan / (United States) M. Bryan; 4-6, 7-6(2), 10-7	(Israel) Erlich / (Israel) Ram	(Croatia) Ivo Karlović (Spain) Rafael Nadal	(Spain) Carlos Moyà (Latvia) Ernests Gulbis (Germany) Philipp Kohlschreiber (Ecuador) Nicolás Lapentti
13 October	Madrid Masters; Madrid, Spain	(United Kingdom) Andy Murray; 6-4, 7-6(6)	(France) Gilles Simon	(Switzerland) Roger Federer (Spain) Rafael Nadal	(France) Gaël Monfils (Argentina) Juan Martín del Potro (Spain) Feliciano López (Croatia) Ivo Karlović
13 October	Madrid Masters; Madrid, Spain	(Poland) Mariusz Fyrstenberg/ (Poland) Marcin Matkowski; 6–4, 6–2	(India) Bhupathi / (The Bahamas) Knowles	(Switzerland) Roger Federer (Spain) Rafael Nadal	(France) Gaël Monfils (Argentina) Juan Martín del Potro (Spain) Feliciano López (Croatia) Ivo Karlović
27 October	Paris Masters; Paris, France	(France) Jo-Wilfried Tsonga; 6-3,4-6,6-4	(Argentina) David Nalbandian	(United States) James Blake (Russia) Nikolay Davydenko	(United States) Andy Roddick (Switzerland) Roger Federer (United Kingdom) Andy Murray (Spain) Rafa Nadal
27 October	Paris Masters; Paris, France	(Sweden) Jonas Björkman / (Zambia) Kevin Ullyett; 6-2,6-2	(South Africa) Jeff Coetzee / (South Africa) Wesley Moodie	(United States) James Blake (Russia) Nikolay Davydenko	(United States) Andy Roddick (Switzerland) Roger Federer (United Kingdom) Andy Murray (Spain) Rafa Nadal

== Tournament details ==
=== Indian Wells ===
Tournament name	Pacific Life Open
Dates	14 March – 23 March
Surface	Hard/Outdoors
Location	Indian Wells, California, United States
Prize money	$3,589,000
Singles	Novak Djokovic d. Mardy Fish 6–2, 5-7, 6-3 (96 players)
Doubles	J Erlich / A Ram d. D Nestor / N Zimonjić 6–4, 6–4 (32 pairs)

==== Singles ====
Fourth Round
1	(Switzerland) R Federer	6	6
23	(Croatia) I Ljubičić	3	4
11	(United Kingdom) A Murray	6	5	3
(Germany) T Haas	2	7	6
(United States) M Fish	7	3	7^{7}
24	(Australia) L Hewitt	5	6	6^{4}
22	(Spain) JC Ferrero	2	2
7	(Argentina) D Nalbandian	6	6
(South Korea) H-T Lee	1	7	4
(Switzerland) S Wawrinka	6	5	6
16	(Argentina) G Cañas	2	3
3	(Serbia) N Djokovic	6	6
8	(France) R Gasquet	4	2
9	(United States) J Blake	6	6
17	(France) J-W Tsonga	7^{7}	6^{3}	5
2	(Spain) R Nadal	6^{4}	7^{7}	7

Quarter-finals
1	(Switzerland) R Federer
(Germany) T Haas	w	/	o
(United States) M Fish	6	6^{5}	7^{7}
7	(Argentina) D Nalbandian	3	7^{7}	6^{4}
(Switzerland) S Wawrinka	6^{5}	2
3	(Serbia) N Djokovic	7^{7}	6
9	(United States) J Blake	5	6	3
2	(Spain) R Nadal	7	3	6

Semi-finals
1	(Switzerland) R Federer	3	2
(United States) M Fish	6	6
3	(Serbia) N Djokovic	6	6
2	(Spain) R Nadal	3	2

Final
(United States) M Fish	2	7	3
3	(Serbia) N Djokovic	6	5	6

==== Doubles ====
Quarterfinals
1	(United States) B Bryan / (United States) M Bryan	7	4	6
(Belarus) M Mirnyi / (United Kingdom) J Murray	5	6	10
4	(Israel) J Erlich / (Israel) A Ram	6	6
6	(India) M Bhupathi / (The Bahamas) M Knowles	3	4
8	(Australia) P Hanley / (India) L Paes	2	1
3	(Canada) D Nestor / (Serbia) N Zimonjić	6	6
(France) R Gasquet / (Sweden) R Lindstedt	6	4	13
(Sweden) J Björkman / (Zimbabwe) K Ullyett	3	6	11

Semi-finals
(Belarus) M Mirnyi / (United Kingdom) J Murray	3	4
4	(Israel) J Erlich / (Israel) A Ram	6	6
3	(Canada) D Nestor / (Serbia) N Zimonjić	7	6
(France) R Gasquet / (Sweden) R Lindstedt	5	2

Final
4	(Israel) J Erlich / (Israel) A Ram	6	6
3	(Canada) D Nestor / (Serbia) N Zimonjić	4	4

=== Miami ===
Tournament name	Sony Ericsson Open
Dates	28 March – 6 April
Surface	Hard/Outdoors
Location	Key Biscayne, Florida, United States
Prize money	$3,770,000
Singles	Nikolay Davydenko d. Rafael Nadal 6-4, 6-2 (96 players)
Doubles	B Bryan / M Bryan d. M Bhupathi / M Knowles 6-2, 6-2 (32 pairs)

==== Singles ====
Fourth Round
1	(Switzerland) R Federer	7^{7}	6
(Argentina) J Acasuso	6^{5}	2
(France) J Benneteau	6	3	2
6	(United States) A Roddick	4	6	6
4	(Russia) N Davydenko	4	6	7
WC	(Croatia) M Ančić	6	3	5
11	(Russia) M Youzhny	6	0	3
(Serbia) J Tipsarević	3	6	6
(Russia) D Tursunov	2	2
10	(Czech Republic) T Berdych	6	6
15	(Argentina) G Cañas	4	6^{6}
31	(Russia) I Andreev	6	7^{8}
27	(Czech Republic) R Štěpánek	3	4
9	(United States) J Blake	6	6
16	(France) P-H Mathieu	4	4
2	(Spain) R Nadal	6	6

Quarter-finals
1	(Switzerland) R Federer	6	6	3
6	(United States) A Roddick	7	4	6
4	(Russia) N Davydenko	6	6
(Serbia) J Tipsarević	2	1
10	(Czech Republic) T Berdych	6	6
31	(Russia) I Andreev	4	4
9	(United States) J Blake	6	3	1
2	(Spain) R Nadal	3	6	6

Semi-finals
6	(United States) A Roddick	6^{5}	2
4	(Russia) N Davydenko	7^{7}	6
10	(Czech Republic) T Berdych	6^{6}	2
2	(Spain) R Nadal	7^{8}	6

Final
4	(Russia) N Davydenko	6	6
2	(Spain) R Nadal	4	2

==== Doubles ====
Quarterfinals
1	(United States) B Bryan / (United States) M Bryan	6	6
5	(Sweden) S Aspelin / (Austria) J Knowle	4	3
(South Africa) J Coetzee / (South Africa) W Moodie	4	6	10
7	(France) A Clément / (France) M Llodra	6	3	5
8	(Australia) P Hanley / (India) L Paes	2	7^{10}	6
4	(India) M Bhupathi / (The Bahamas) M Knowles	6	6^{8}	10
6	(Czech Republic) M Damm / (Czech Republic) P Vízner	4	6	14
(France) R Gasquet / (France) J-W Tsonga	6	4	12

Semi-finals
1	(United States) B Bryan / (United States) M Bryan	6	6
(South Africa) J Coetzee / (South Africa) W Moodie	1	4
4	(India) M Bhupathi / (The Bahamas) M Knowles	7^{7}	4	11
6	(Czech Republic) M Damm / (Czech Republic) P Vízner	6^{5}	6	9

Final
1	(United States) B Bryan / (United States) M Bryan	6	6
4	(India) M Bhupathi / (The Bahamas) M Knowles	2	2

=== Monte Carlo ===
Tournament name	Masters Series Monte Carlo
Dates	20 April – 27 April
Surface	Clay
Location	Roquebrune-Cap-Martin, France
Prize money	€2,270,000
Singles	Rafael Nadal d. Roger Federer 7-5, 7-5 (56 players)
Doubles	R Nadal / T Robredo d. M Bhupathi / M Knowles 6-3, 6-3 (24 pairs)

==== Singles ====
Third Round
1	(Switzerland) R Federer	6	6
(France) G Monfils	3	4
12	(Spain) T Robredo	1	0
6	(Argentina) D Nalbandian	6	6
3	(Serbia) N Djokovic	6	6
14	(United Kingdom) A Murray	0	4
(United States) S Querrey	2	6	6
7	(France) R Gasquet	6	4	3
(Russia) I Andreev	7	4	6
(Spain) N Almagro	5	6	4
16	(Germany) P Kohlschreiber	6	5	2
4	(Russia) N Davydenko	3	7	6
5	(Spain) D Ferrer	6	6
(Serbia) J Tipsarević	4	0
13	(Spain) JC Ferrero	4	1
2	(Spain) R Nadal	6	6

Quarter-finals
1	(Switzerland) R Federer	5	6	6
6	(Argentina) D Nalbandian	7	2	2
3	(Serbia) N Djokovic	6	6
(United States) S Querrey	4	0
(Russia) I Andreev	3	6	5
4	(Russia) N Davydenko	6	4	7
5	(Spain) D Ferrer	1	5
2	(Spain) R Nadal	6	7

Semi-finals
1	(Switzerland) R Federer	6	3
3	(Serbia) N Djokovic	3	2	r
4	(Russia) N Davydenko	3	2
2	(Spain) R Nadal	6	6

Final
1	(Switzerland) R Federer	5	5
2	(Spain) R Nadal	7	7

==== Doubles ====
Quarterfinals
1	(United States) B Bryan / (United States) M Bryan	6	4	8
(South Africa) J Coetzee / (South Africa) W Moodie	4	6	10
4	(India) M Bhupathi / (The Bahamas) M Knowles	6	6
5	(Sweden) S Aspelin / (Austria) J Knowle	2	3
(Czech Republic) F Čermák / (Germany) P Kohlschreiber	7^{7}	1	3
(Spain) R Nadal / (Spain) T Robredo	6^{5}	6	10
8	(Sweden) J Björkman / (Zimbabwe) K Ullyett	6	6
2	(Israel) J Erlich / (Israel) A Ram	4	4

Semi-finals
(South Africa) J Coetzee / (South Africa) W Moodie	0	5
4	(India) M Bhupathi / (The Bahamas) M Knowles	6	7
(Spain) R Nadal / (Spain) T Robredo	5	7^{8}	10
8	(Sweden) J Björkman / (Zimbabwe) K Ullyett	7	6^{6}	7

Final
4	(India) M Bhupathi / (The Bahamas) M Knowles	3	3
(Spain) R Nadal / (Spain) T Robredo	6	6

=== Rome ===
Tournament name	Rome Masters
Dates	5 May – 11 May
Surface	Clay
Location	Rome, Italy
Prize money	€2,270,000
Singles	Novak Djokovic d. Stanislas Wawrinka 4-6, 6-3, 6-3 (56 players)
Doubles	B Bryan / M Bryan d. D Nestor / N Zimonjić 3-6, 6-4, 10-8 (24 pairs)

==== Singles ====
Third Round
1	(Switzerland) R Federer	7^{7}	6
(Croatia) I Karlović	6^{4}	3
Q	(Peru) L Horna	4	6	3
(Czech Republic) R Štěpánek	6	1	6
3	(Serbia) N Djokovic	6	3	6
(Russia) I Andreev	3	6	3
12	(Chile) F González
(Spain) N Almagro	w	/	o
6	(United States) A Roddick	7^{7}	6
(Italy) S Bolelli	6^{5}	3
14	(Spain) T Robredo	4	6	7^{7}
4	(Russia) N Davydenko	6	2	6^{4}
8	(United States) J Blake	5	7	6
(Spain) F Verdasco	7	5	2
(Switzerland) S Wawrinka	6	6
(Spain) JC Ferrero	4	3

Quarter-finals
1	(Switzerland) R Federer	6^{4}	6^{7}
(Czech Republic) R Štěpánek	7^{7}	7^{9}
3	(Serbia) N Djokovic	6	1
(Spain) N Almagro	1	0	r
6	(United States) A Roddick	6	4	7^{7}
14	(Spain) T Robredo	3	6	6^{4}
8	(United States) J Blake	7^{7}	6^{5}	1
(Switzerland) S Wawrinka	6^{5}	7^{7}	6

Semi-finals
(Czech Republic) R Štěpánek	0	0	r
3	(Serbia) N Djokovic	6	1
6	(United States) A Roddick	0	r
(Switzerland) S Wawrinka	3

Final
3	(Serbia) N Djokovic	4	6	6
(Switzerland) S Wawrinka	6	3	3

==== Doubles ====
Quarterfinals
1	(United States) B Bryan / (United States) M Bryan	6	6
WC	(Italy) F Cipolla / (Italy) P Starace	1	4
(Australia) J Kerr / (Finland) J Nieminen	4	6	6
7	(Sweden) J Björkman / (Zimbabwe) K Ullyett	6	4	10
(France) R Gasquet / (France) F Santoro	6	6
(Spain) F López / (Spain) F Verdasco	3	4
(Poland) M Fyrstenberg / (Poland) M Matkowski	4	1
2	(Canada) D Nestor / (Serbia) N Zimonjić	6	6

Semifinals
1	(United States) B Bryan / (United States) M Bryan	6	6
7	(Sweden) J Björkman / (Zimbabwe) K Ullyett	2	1
(France) R Gasquet / (France) F Santoro	3	6	8
2	(Canada) D Nestor / (Serbia) N Zimonjić	6	3	10

Final
1	(United States) B Bryan / (United States) M Bryan	3	6	10
2	(Canada) D Nestor / (Serbia) N Zimonjić	6	4	8

=== Hamburg ===
Tournament name	Hamburg Masters
Dates	10 May – 18 May
Surface	Clay
Location	Hamburg, Germany
Prize money	€2,270,000
Singles	Rafael Nadal d. Roger Federer 7-5, 6-7(3), 6-3 (56 players)
Doubles	B Bryan / M Bryan d. D Nestor / N Zimonjić 6-4, 5-7, 10-8 (24 pairs)

==== Singles ====
Third Round
1	(Switzerland) R Federer	6	6
(Sweden) R Söderling	3	2
(Spain) F Verdasco	7^{7}	6
5	(Spain) D Ferrer	6^{4}	2
4	(Russia) N Davydenko	5	3
(Germany) N Kiefer	7	6
12	(Argentina) J Mónaco	0	3
(Italy) A Seppi	6	6
(Serbia) J Tipsarević	2	1
(Spain) A Montañés	6	6
(Croatia) I Karlović	6^{3}	3
3	(Serbia) N Djokovic	7^{7}	6
Q	(Russia) M Safin	2	7^{7}	1
11	(Spain) C Moyà	6	6^{3}	6
15	(United Kingdom) A Murray	3	2
2	(Spain) R Nadal	6	6

Quarter-finals
1	(Switzerland) R Federer	6	6
(Spain) F Verdasco	3	3
(Germany) N Kiefer	3	7	5
(Italy) A Seppi	6	5	7
(Spain) A Montañés	2	3
3	(Serbia) N Djokovic	6	6
11	(Spain) C Moyà	1	3
2	(Spain) R Nadal	6	6

Semi-finals
1	(Switzerland) R Federer	6	6
(Italy) A Seppi	3	1
3	(Serbia) N Djokovic	5	6	2
2	(Spain) R Nadal	7	2	6

Final
1	(Switzerland) R Federer	5	7	3
2	(Spain) R Nadal	7	6^{3}	6

==== Doubles ====
Quarterfinals
1	(United States) B Bryan / (United States) M Bryan	7	6
6	(Czech Republic) M Damm / (Czech Republic) P Vízner	5	4
(United States) J Blake / (United States) M Fish	7^{7}	7^{7}
(France) J Benneteau / (France) M Llodra	6^{6}	6^{5}
Alt	(Croatia) I Ljubičić / (Sweden) R Söderling	2	6^{3}
(India) L Paes / (Spain) T Robredo	6	7^{7}
5	(Sweden) S Aspelin / (Austria) J Knowle	2	7	8
2	(Canada) D Nestor / (Serbia) N Zimonjić	6	5	10

Semifinals
1	(United States) B Bryan / (United States) M Bryan	6	4	10
(United States) J Blake / (United States) M Fish	2	6	7
(India) L Paes / (Spain) T Robredo	3	6	2
2	(Canada) D Nestor / (Serbia) N Zimonjić	6	3	10

Final
1	(United States) B Bryan / (United States) M Bryan	4	7	8
2	(Canada) D Nestor / (Serbia) N Zimonjić	6	5	10

=== Toronto ===
Tournament name	Toronto Masters
Dates	21 July – 27 July
Surface	Hard
Location	Toronto, Canada
Prize money	$2,615,000
Singles	Rafael Nadal d. Nicolas Kiefer 6-3, 6-2 (56 players)
Doubles	D Nestor / N Zimonjić d. B Bryan / M Bryan 6-2, 4-6, 10-6 (24 pairs)

==== Singles ====
Third Round
(France) G Simon	6	6
(Argentina) J Acasuso	3	4
(Croatia) M Čilić	6	4	6
6	(United States) A Roddick	4	6	4
4	(Russia) N Davydenko	6	4	4
(Germany) N Kiefer	4	6	6
(Russia) D Tursunov	6	1	4
7	(United States) J Blake	4	6	6
8	(United Kingdom) A Murray	6	0	6
9	(Switzerland) S Wawrinka	2	6	4
(Sweden) R Söderling	4	4
3	(Serbia) N Djokovic	6	6
5	(Spain) D Ferrer	3	3
10	(France) R Gasquet	6	6
(Russia) I Andreev	2	6^{1}
2	(Spain) R Nadal	6	7^{7}

Quarter-finals
(France) G Simon	3	6	6
(Croatia) M Čilić	6	2	3
(Germany) N Kiefer	6	6
7	(United States) J Blake	1	2
8	(United Kingdom) A Murray	6	7^{7}
3	(Serbia) N Djokovic	3	6^{3}
10	(France) R Gasquet	7^{14}	2	1
2	(Spain) R Nadal	6^{12}	6	6

Semi-finals
(France) G Simon	7^{7}	3	6^{5}
(Germany) N Kiefer	6^{4}	6	7^{7}
8	(United Kingdom) A Murray	6^{2}	3
2	(Spain) R Nadal	7^{7}	6

Final
(Germany) N Kiefer	3	2
2	(Spain) R Nadal	6	6

==== Doubles ====
Semifinals
1	(United States) Bob Bryan (United States) Mike Bryan	6	6
(Australia) Paul Hanley (Australia) Jordan Kerr	3	4
7	(Czech Republic) Lukáš Dlouhý (India) Leander Paes	3	6^{5}
2	(Canada) Daniel Nestor (Serbia) Nenad Zimonjić	6	7

Final
1	(United States) Bob Bryan (United States) Mike Bryan	2	6	[6]
2	(Canada) Daniel Nestor (Serbia) Nenad Zimonjić	6	4	[10]

=== Cincinnati ===
Tournament name	Cincinnati Masters
Dates	28 July – 3 August
Surface	Hard
Location	Cincinnati, USA
Prize money	€2,270,000
Singles	Andy Murray d. Novak Djokovic 7-6(4), 7-6(5) (56 players)
Doubles	B Bryan / M Bryan d. A Ram / J Erlich 4-6, 7-6(2), 10-7 (24 pairs)

==== Singles ====
Third Round
1	(Switzerland) R Federer	6^{6}	6	6^{5}
16	(Croatia) I Karlović	7	4	7
(Sweden) R Söderling	6^{4}	7	6^{8}
(Germany) P Kohlschreiber	7	5	7
(Spain) C Moyà	6	7
(Russia) I Andreev	4	6^{2}
(Russia) D Tursunov	3	3
8	(United Kingdom) A Murray	6	6
7	(United States) J Blake	4	6	3
(Latvia) E Gulbis	6	1	6
(Italy) A Seppi	1	2
3	(Serbia) N Djokovic	6	6
(Ecuador) N Lapentti	6	7
10	(Spain) F Verdasco	3	5
(Germany) T Haas	4	6^{0}
2	(Spain) R Nadal	6	7

Quarter-finals
16	(Croatia) I Karlović	7	7
(Germany) P Kohlschreiber	6^{3}	6^{3}
(Spain) C Moyà	6	3	1
8	(United Kingdom) A Murray	2	6	6
(Latvia) E Gulbis	3	4
3	(Serbia) N Djokovic	6	6
(Ecuador) N Lapentti	6^{3}	1
2	(Spain) R Nadal	7	6

Semi-finals
16	(Croatia) I Karlović	4	4
8	(United Kingdom) A Murray	6	6
3	(Serbia) N Djokovic	6	7
2	(Spain) R Nadal	1	5

Final
8	(United Kingdom) A Murray	7	7
3	(Serbia) N Djokovic	6^{4}	6^{5}

==== Doubles ====
Quarterfinals
1	(United States) B Bryan (United States) M Bryan	6	7
8	(Poland) M Fyrstenberg (Poland) M Matkowski	4	6^{0}
4	(India) M Bhupathi (The Bahamas) M Knowles	7	6^{5}	[12]
WC	(United States) M Fish (United States) J Isner	5	7	[10]
(Sweden) S Aspelin (United Kingdom) J Murray	3	3
3	(Israel) J Erlich (Israel) A Ram	6	6
6	(Czech Republic) L Dlouhý (India) L Paes	6^{6}	6^{5}
2	(Canada) D Nestor (Serbia) N Zimonjić	7	7

Semifinals
1	(United States) B Bryan (United States) M Bryan	4	7	[10]
4	(India) M Bhupathi (The Bahamas) M Knowles	6	6^{7}	[8]
3	(Israel) J Erlich (Israel) A Ram	6	5	[10]
2	(Canada) D Nestor (Serbia) N Zimonjić	4	7	[7]

Final
1	(United States) Bob Bryan (United States) Mike Bryan	4	7	[10]
3	(Israel) Jonathan Erlich (Israel) Andy Ram	6	6^{2}	[7]

=== Madrid ===
Tournament name	Madrid Masters
Dates	13 October – 19 October
Surface	Hard/Indoors
Location	Madrid, Spain
Prize money	€2,270,000
Singles	A Murray d. G Simon 6-4, 7-6 (6) (48 players)
Doubles	M Fyrstenberg / M Matkowski d. M Bhupathi/M Knowles 6-4, 6-2 (24 pairs)

==== Singles ====
Third Round
1	(Spain) R Nadal	6	6
15	(France) R Gasquet	4	4
10	(Switzerland) S Wawrinka	4	4
(Spain) F López	6	6
3	(Serbia) N Djokovic	6^{4}	6^{5}
14	(Croatia) I Karlović	7	7
(France) G Simon	6^{6}	6	7
Q	(United States) R Ginepri	7	4	6^{6}
8	(United States) A Roddick	4	6	3
(France) G Monfils	6	3	6
(Croatia) M Čilić	5	6^{2}
4	(United Kingdom) A Murray	7	7
7	(Argentina) D Nalbandian	4	2
9	(Argentina) JM del Potro	6	6
16	(France) J-W Tsonga	4	1
2	(Switzerland) R Federer	6	6

Quarter-finals
1	(Spain) R Nadal	6	6
(Spain) F López	4	4
14	(Croatia) I Karlović	6^{1}	6	6^{2}
(France) G Simon	7	4	7
(France) G Monfils	2	2
4	(United Kingdom) A Murray	6	6
9	(Argentina) JM del Potro	3	3
2	(Switzerland) R Federer	6	6

Semi-finals
1	(Spain) R Nadal	6	5	6^{6}
(France) G Simon	3	7	7
4	(United Kingdom) A Murray	3	6	7
2	(Switzerland) R Federer	6	3	5

Final
(France) G Simon	4	6^{6}
4	(United Kingdom) A Murray	6	7

==== Doubles ====
Quarterfinals
1	(United States) B Bryan (United States) M Bryan	4	4
5	(Sweden) J Björkman (Zimbabwe) K Ullyett	6	6
4	(India) M Bhupathi (The Bahamas) M Knowles	7	6
6	(Sweden) S Aspelin (Austria) J Knowle	3	5
8	(South Africa) J Coetzee (South Africa) W Moodie	7	6
WC	(Spain) P Andújar (Spain) M Granollers	6^{5}	3
7	(Poland) M Fyrstenberg (Poland) M Matkowski	6	3	[11]
2	(Canada) D Nestor (Serbia) N Zimonjić	3	6	[9]

Semifinals
5	(Sweden) J Björkman (Zimbabwe) K Ullyett	2	4
4	(India) M Bhupathi (The Bahamas) M Knowles	6	6
8	(South Africa) J Coetzee (South Africa) W Moodie	7	6^{4}	[10]
7	(Poland) M Fyrstenberg (Poland) M Matkowski	6^{5}	7	[12]

Final
4	(India) M Bhupathi (The Bahamas) M Knowles	4	2
7	(Poland) M Fyrstenberg (Poland) M Matkowski	6	6

=== Paris ===
Tournament name	Paris Masters
Dates	27 October – 2 November
Surface	Carpet
Location	Paris, France
Prize money	€2,270,000
Singles	J-W Tsonga d. D. Nalbandian 6-3, 4-6, 6-4 (48 players)
Doubles	J Björkman / K Ullyett d. J Coetzee/W Moodie 6-2, 6-2 (24 pairs)

==== Singles ====
Third Round
1	(Spain) R Nadal	6	6
16	(France) G Monfils	3	2
(Czech Republic) T Berdych	1	1
6	(Russia) N Davydenko	6	6
4	(United Kingdom) A Murray	6	7
15	(Spain) F Verdasco	3	6^{6}
8	(Argentina) JM del Potro	4	0
9	(Argentina) D Nalbandian	6	6
7	(United States) A Roddick	6	7
10	(France) G Simon	3	5
13	(France) J-W Tsonga	6	1	6
3	(Serbia) N Djokovic	4	6	3
(Germany) P Kohlschreiber	4	4
11	(United States) J Blake	6	6
(Croatia) M Čilić	3	4
2	(Switzerland) R Federer	6	6

Quarter-finals
1	(Spain) R Nadal	1	r
6	(Russia) N Davydenko	6
4	(United Kingdom) A Murray	6^{3}	3
8	(Argentina) D Nalbandian	7	6
7	(United States) A Roddick	7	4	6^{5}
13	(France) J-W Tsonga	5	6	7
11	(United States) J Blake	w/o
2	(Switzerland) R Federer

Semi-finals
6	(Russia) N Davydenko	1	7	4
8	(Argentina) D Nalbandian	6	5	6
13	(France) J-W Tsonga	6	6
11	(United States) J Blake	4	3

Final
8	(Argentina) D Nalbandian	3	6	4
13	(France) J-W Tsonga	6	4	6

==== Doubles ====
Semifinals
(Poland) Mariusz Fyrstenberg (Poland) Marcin Matkowski	4	3
6	(South Africa) Jeff Coetzee (South Africa) Wesley Moodie	6	6
5	(Sweden) Jonas Björkman (Zimbabwe) Kevin Ullyett	6	6
(France) Arnaud Clément (France) Michaël Llodra	3	2

Final
6	(South Africa) Jeff Coetzee (South Africa) Wesley Moodie	2	2
5	(Sweden) Jonas Björkman (Zimbabwe) Kevin Ullyett	6	6

== See also ==
- ATP Tour Masters 1000
- 2008 ATP Tour
- 2008 WTA Tier I Series
- 2008 WTA Tour
