= 2007 Monte Carlo Masters – Doubles =

Doubles
- 2007 Monte Carlo Masters

Final
- Champions: (United States) Bob Bryan (United States) Mike Bryan
- Runners-up: (France) Julien Benneteau (France) Richard Gasquet
- Score: 6–2, 6–1

Events
| Singles | Doubles |
| ← 2006 · | Monte Carlo Masters | · 2008 → |

Jonas Björkman and Max Mirnyi were the defending champions, but lost in quarterfinals to Julien Benneteau and Richard Gasquet.

Bob Bryan and Mike Bryan won in the final 6–2, 6–1, against Julien Benneteau and Richard Gasquet.

== Seeds ==
All seeds receive a bye into the second round.

1. (United States) Bob Bryan / (United States) Mike Bryan (champions)
2. (Sweden) Jonas Björkman / (Belarus) Max Mirnyi (quarterfinals)
3. (The Bahamas) Mark Knowles / (Canada) Daniel Nestor (second round)
4. (France) Fabrice Santoro / (Serbia) Nenad Zimonjić (second round)
5. (Australia) Paul Hanley / (Zimbabwe) Kevin Ullyett (semifinals)
6. (Israel) Jonathan Erlich / (Israel) Andy Ram (second round)
7. (Sweden) Simon Aspelin / (Austria) Julian Knowle (semifinals)
8. (Czech Republic) František Čermák / (Czech Republic) Pavel Vízner (second round)

== Draw ==
=== Key ===
- Q = Qualifier
- WC = Wild card
- LL = Lucky loser
- Alt = Alternate
- SE = Special exempt
- PR = Protected ranking
- ITF = ITF entry
- JE = Junior exempt
- w/o = Walkover
- r = Retired
- d = Defaulted
- SR = Special ranking

=== Finals ===
Semifinals

Final

1
- (United States) Bob Bryan
- (United States) Mike Bryan
7^{7}
6

5
- (Australia) Paul Hanley
- (Zimbabwe) Kevin Ullyett
6^{2}
2

1
- (United States) Bob Bryan
- (United States) Mike Bryan
6
6

- (France) Julien Benneteau
- (France) Richard Gasquet
2
1

7
- (Sweden) Simon Aspelin
- (Austria) Julian Knowle
1
4

- (France) Julien Benneteau
- (France) Richard Gasquet
6
6

=== Top half ===
First round

Second round

Quarterfinals

Semifinals

1
- (United States) B Bryan
- (United States) M Bryan
6
6

- (Serbia) N Djokovic
- (Spain) F Verdasco
6^{4}
1

- (Argentina) J Acasuso
- (Argentina) JI Chela
2
1

- (Argentina) J Acasuso
- (Argentina) JI Chela
7^{7}
6

1
- (United States) B Bryan
- (United States) M Bryan
6
6

WC
- (Spain) R Nadal
- (Spain) B Salvá Vidal
6^{7}
6^{5}

- (Australia) A Fisher
- (United States) J Thomas
0
2

- (Australia) A Fisher
- (United States) J Thomas
7^{9}
7^{7}

- (Australia) A Fisher
- (United States) J Thomas
7
6

8
- (Czech Republic) F Čermák
- (Czech Republic) P Vízner
5
3

1
- (United States) B Bryan
- (United States) M Bryan
7^{7}
6

5
- (Australia) P Hanley
- (Zimbabwe) K Ullyett
6^{2}
2

3
- (The Bahamas) M Knowles
- (Canada) D Nestor
6
4
[4]

- (Chile) F González
- (Croatia) I Ljubičić
6^{5}
6
[10]

- (Chile) F González
- (Croatia) I Ljubičić
3
6
[10]

- (Czech Republic) T Berdych
- (Slovakia) D Hrbatý
7^{7}
4
[6]

- (Chile) F González
- (Croatia) I Ljubičić
4
6
[10]

- (Poland) M Fyrstenberg
- (Poland) M Matkowski
7^{7}

5
- (Australia) P Hanley
- (Zimbabwe) K Ullyett
6
4
[12]

- (United Kingdom) A Murray
- (United Kingdom) J Murray
6^{1}
r

- (Poland) M Fyrstenberg
- (Poland) M Matkowski
4
3

5
- (Australia) P Hanley
- (Zimbabwe) K Ullyett
6
6

=== Bottom half ===
First round

Second round

Quarterfinals

Semifinals

7
- (Sweden) S Aspelin
- (Austria) J Knowle
5
6
[10]

WC
- (Switzerland) Y Allegro
- (France) G Simon
6
2
[8]

- (Russia) I Andreev
- (Russia) D Tursunov
7
1
[6]

- (Russia) I Andreev
- (Russia) D Tursunov
3
6
[10]

7
- (Sweden) S Aspelin
- (Austria) J Knowle
6
6

- (Finland) J Nieminen
- (Romania) A Pavel
7^{7}
6

- (Finland) J Nieminen
- (Romania) A Pavel
3
4

Alt
- (Germany) B Becker
- (United States) E Butorac
6^{4}
2

- (Finland) J Nieminen
- (Romania) A Pavel
3
6
[10]

4
- (France) F Santoro
- (Serbia) N Zimonjić
6
0
[8]

7
- (Sweden) S Aspelin
- (Austria) J Knowle
1
4

- (France) J Benneteau
- (France) R Gasquet
6
6

6
- (Israel) J Erlich
- (Israel) A Ram
6
3
[13]

- (France) J Benneteau
- (France) R Gasquet
7
6

- (France) J Benneteau
- (France) R Gasquet
4
6
[15]

- (Germany) M Kohlmann
- (Czech Republic) J Levinský
5
3

- (France) J Benneteau
- (France) R Gasquet
1
6
[10]

- (India) M Bhupathi
- (Czech Republic) R Štěpánek
6
6

2
- (Sweden) J Björkman
- (Belarus) M Mirnyi
6
3
[5]

- (France) A Clément
- (France) M Llodra
4
4

- (India) M Bhupathi
- (Czech Republic) R Štěpánek
3
4

2
- (Sweden) J Björkman
- (Belarus) M Mirnyi
6
6
