= 2008 Rogers Masters – Singles =

Singles
- 2008 Rogers Masters

Final
- Champion: (Spain) Rafael Nadal
- Runner-up: (Germany) Nicolas Kiefer
- Score: 6–3, 6–2

Details
- Draw: 56 (7Q / 4WC)
- Seeds: 16

Events
Singles	Doubles
- Rogers Masters

Rafael Nadal defeated Nicolas Kiefer in the final, 6–3, 6–2 to win the men's singles tennis title at the 2008 Canadian Open.

Novak Djokovic was the defending champion, but lost in the quarterfinals to Andy Murray.

== Seeds ==
The top eight seeds receive a bye into the second round.

1. (Switzerland) Roger Federer (second round)
2. (Spain) Rafael Nadal (champion)
3. (Serbia) Novak Djokovic (quarterfinals)
4. (Russia) Nikolay Davydenko (third round)
5. (Spain) David Ferrer (third round)
6. (United States) Andy Roddick (third round)
7. (United States) James Blake (quarterfinals)
8. (United Kingdom) Andy Murray (semifinals)
9. (Switzerland) Stanislas Wawrinka (third round)
10. (France) Richard Gasquet (quarterfinals)
11. (Czech Republic) Radek Štěpánek (first round)
12. (Spain) Tommy Robredo (second round)
13. (Spain) Fernando Verdasco (second round)
14. (Chile) Fernando González (second round)
15. (Russia) Mikhail Youzhny (second round)
16. (Czech Republic) Tomáš Berdych (second round)

== Draw ==
Key

- Q = Qualifier
- WC = Wild card
- LL = Lucky loser
- Alt = Alternate
- ITF = ITF entry
- PR = Protected ranking
- SR = Special ranking
- SE = Special exempt
- JE = Junior exempt
- JR = Junior Accelerator Programme entrant
- CO = College Accelerator Programme entrant
- NG = Next Gen Accelerator Program entrant
- w/o = Walkover
- r = Retired
- d = Defaulted

=== Finals ===
Quarterfinals
(France) Gilles Simon	3	6	6
(Croatia) Marin Čilić	6	2	3
(Germany) Nicolas Kiefer	6	6
7	(United States) James Blake	1	2
8	(United Kingdom) Andy Murray	6	7^{7}
3	(Serbia) Novak Djokovic	3	6^{3}
10	(France) Richard Gasquet	7^{14}	2	1
2	(Spain) Rafael Nadal	6^{12}	6	6

Semifinals
(France) Gilles Simon	7^{7}	3	6^{5}
(Germany) Nicolas Kiefer	6^{4}	6	7^{7}
8	(United Kingdom) Andy Murray	6^{2}	3
2	(Spain) Rafael Nadal	7^{7}	6

Final
(Germany) Nicolas Kiefer	3	2
2	(Spain) Rafael Nadal	6	6

=== Top half ===
==== Section 1 ====
First round
Q	(United States) D Young	1	3
(France) G Simon	6	6
(Argentina) J Acasuso	6^{1}	6	7
(Latvia) E Gulbis	7^{7}	3	5
(France) J Benneteau	2	1
14	(Chile) F González	6	6
12	(Spain) T Robredo	7^{7}	6
WC	(Canada) F Niemeyer	6^{4}	1
(Croatia) M Čilić	6	4	6
Q	(Czech Republic) L Dlouhý	3	6	3
(Serbia) J Tipsarević	3	7^{7}	2
(France) N Mahut	6	6^{5}	6

Second round
1	(Switzerland) R Federer	6	5	4
(France) G Simon	2	7	6
(Argentina) J Acasuso	6	3	6
14	(Chile) F González	3	6	3
12	(Spain) T Robredo	3	4
(Croatia) M Čilić	6	6
(France) N Mahut	1	7^{8}	3
6	(United States) A Roddick	6	6^{6}	6

Third round
(France) G Simon	6	6
(Argentina) J Acasuso	3	4
(Croatia) M Čilić	6	4	6
6	(United States) A Roddick	4	6	4

Quarterfinals
(France) G Simon	3	6	6
(Croatia) M Čilić	6	2	3

==== Section 2 ====
First round
(Spain) C Moyá	3	2
(Germany) T Haas	6	6
(United States) M Fish	5	6^{4}
(Germany) N Kiefer	7	7^{7}
(Italy) A Seppi	6^{1}	2
15	(Russia) M Youzhny	7^{7}	6
11	(Czech Republic) R Štěpánek	6	3	4
(Spain) F López	4	6	6
(Russia) D Tursunov	6	6
(Ecuador) N Lapentti	3	4
Q	(Sweden) J Björkman	6	3	6
Q	(France) A Clément	3	6	0

Second round
4	(Russia) N Davydenko	6	7^{8}
(Germany) T Haas	3	6^{6}
(Germany) N Kiefer	7^{7}	7
15	(Russia) M Youzhny	6^{4}	5
(Spain) F López	3	6^{6}
(Russia) D Tursunov	6	7^{8}
Q	(Sweden) J Björkman	6	1	2
7	(United States) J Blake	1	6	6

Third round
4	(Russia) N Davydenko	6	4	4
(Germany) N Kiefer	4	6	6
(Russia) D Tursunov	6	1	4
7	(United States) J Blake	4	6	6

Quarterfinals
(Germany) N Kiefer	6	6
7	(United States) J Blake	1	2

=== Bottom half ===
==== Section 3 ====
First round
Q	(Kazakhstan) A Golubev	6^{4}	1
LL	(Sweden) T Johansson	7^{7}	6
WC	(Russia) M Safin	6	6
(United States) S Querrey	3	3
(Italy) S Bolelli	4	6^{4}
9	(Switzerland) S Wawrinka	6	7^{7}
13	(Spain) F Verdasco	1	6	6
(Brazil) T Bellucci	6	3	2
(Argentina) G Cañas	5	1
(Sweden) R Söderling	7	6
WC	(Canada) F Dancevic	6	6
(Croatia) M Ančić	3	4

Second round
8	(United Kingdom) A Murray	6	6
LL	(Sweden) T Johansson	4	4
WC	(Russia) M Safin	3	4
9	(Switzerland) S Wawrinka	6	6
13	(Spain) F Verdasco	4	7^{7}	4
(Sweden) R Söderling	6	6^{4}	6
WC	(Canada) F Dancevic	4	4
3	(Serbia) N Djokovic	6	6

Third round
8	(United Kingdom) A Murray	6	0	6
9	(Switzerland) S Wawrinka	2	6	4
(Sweden) R Söderling	4	4
3	(Serbia) N Djokovic	6	6

Quarterfinals
8	(United Kingdom) A Murray	6	7^{7}
3	(Serbia) N Djokovic	3	6^{3}

==== Section 4 ====
First round
(United States) R Ginepri	6	4	6
(France) P-H Mathieu	3	6	4
Q	(Russia) A Kudryavtsev	6	7^{9}
(Germany) P Kohlschreiber	2	6^{7}
(France) M Llodra	2	6	3
10	(France) R Gasquet	6	4	6
16	(Czech Republic) T Berdych	6	6
(Finland) J Nieminen	3	1
(France) G Monfils	6^{5}	6^{3}
(Russia) I Andreev	7^{7}	7^{7}
WC	(Canada) P Polansky	2	4
Q	(United States) J Levine	6	6

Second round
5	(Spain) D Ferrer	6	6
(United States) R Ginepri	4	4
Q	(Russia) A Kudryavtsev	5	3
10	(France) R Gasquet	7	6
16	(Czech Republic) T Berdych	4	6	4
(Russia) I Andreev	6	3	6
Q	(United States) J Levine	4	2
2	(Spain) R Nadal	6	6

Third round
5	(Spain) D Ferrer	3	3
10	(France) R Gasquet	6	6
(Russia) I Andreev	2	6^{1}
2	(Spain) R Nadal	6	7^{7}

Quarterfinals
10	(France) R Gasquet	7^{14}	2	1
2	(Spain) R Nadal	6^{12}	6	6
