= 2009 Monte-Carlo Rolex Masters – Doubles =

Doubles
- 2009 Monte-Carlo Rolex Masters

Final
- Champions: (Canada) Daniel Nestor (Serbia) Nenad Zimonjić
- Runners-up: (United States) Bob Bryan (United States) Mike Bryan
- Score: 6–4, 6–1

Events
Singles	Doubles
← 2008 ·	Monte-Carlo Rolex Masters	· 2010 →

Daniel Nestor and Nenad Zimonjić defeated Bob Bryan and Mike Bryan in the final, 6–4, 6–1, to win the doubles tennis title at the 2009 Monte-Carlo Masters. Nestor completed the career Golden Masters in doubles with the win.

Rafael Nadal and Tommy Robredo were the defending champions, but Nadal chose not to participate. Robredo partnered with Albert Montañés, but they lost in the second round to Lukáš Dlouhý and Leander Paes.

== Seeds ==
All seeds receive a bye into the second round.

1. (United States) Bob Bryan / (United States) Mike Bryan (final)
2. (Canada) Daniel Nestor / (Serbia) Nenad Zimonjić (champions)
3. (Czech Republic) Lukáš Dlouhý / (India) Leander Paes (semifinals)
4. (India) Mahesh Bhupathi / (The Bahamas) Mark Knowles (quarterfinals)
5. (Brazil) Bruno Soares / (Zimbabwe) Kevin Ullyett (second round)
6. (Poland) Mariusz Fyrstenberg / (Poland) Marcin Matkowski (quarterfinals)
7. (Austria) Julian Knowle / (Israel) Andy Ram (quarterfinals)
8. (South Africa) Jeff Coetzee / (Australia) Jordan Kerr (second round)

== Draw ==
=== Key ===
- Q = Qualifier
- WC = Wild card
- LL = Lucky loser
- Alt = Alternate
- SE = Special exempt
- PR = Protected ranking
- ITF = ITF entry
- JE = Junior exempt
- w/o = Walkover
- r = Retired
- d = Defaulted
- SR = Special ranking

=== Finals ===
Semifinals
1	(United States) Bob Bryan (United States) Mike Bryan	6^{3}	6	[14]
3	(Czech Republic) Lukáš Dlouhý (India) Leander Paes	7^{7}	3	[12]
(Serbia) Novak Djokovic (Serbia) Viktor Troicki	6	1	[5]
2	(Canada) Daniel Nestor (Serbia) Nenad Zimonjić	3	6	[10]

Final
1	(United States) Bob Bryan (United States) Mike Bryan	4	1
2	(Canada) Daniel Nestor (Serbia) Nenad Zimonjić	6	6

=== Top half ===
First round
WC	(Monaco) G Couillard (Monaco) J-R Lisnard	5	3
(Switzerland) R Federer (Switzerland) S Wawrinka	7	6
(France) J Chardy (France) G Simon	4	1
(Russia) N Davydenko (Austria) O Marach	6	6
(Czech Republic) T Berdych (Czech Republic) F Čermák	4	5
(Spain) A Montañés (Spain) T Robredo	6	7
(Sweden) R Lindstedt (Sweden) R Söderling	2	4
(Sweden) S Aspelin (South Africa) W Moodie	6	6

Second round
1	(United States) B Bryan (United States) M Bryan	w/o
(Switzerland) R Federer (Switzerland) S Wawrinka
(Russia) N Davydenko (Austria) O Marach	3	4
6	(Poland) M Fyrstenberg (Poland) M Matkowski	6	6
3	(Czech Republic) L Dlouhý (India) L Paes	2	7^{7}	[10]
(Spain) A Montañés (Spain) T Robredo	6	6^{5}	[8]
(Sweden) S Aspelin (South Africa) W Moodie	6^{3}	2
7	(Austria) J Knowle (Israel) A Ram	7^{7}	6

Quarterfinals
1	(United States) B Bryan (United States) M Bryan	4	6	[10]
6	(Poland) M Fyrstenberg (Poland) M Matkowski	6	2	4
3	(Czech Republic) L Dlouhý (India) L Paes	7^{7}	6
7	(Austria) J Knowle (Israel) A Ram	6^{3}	3

Semifinals
1	(United States) B Bryan (United States) M Bryan	6^{3}	6	[14]
3	(Czech Republic) L Dlouhý (India) L Paes	7^{7}	3	[12]

=== Bottom half ===
First round
(Brazil) M Melo (Brazil) A Sá	1	4
(Serbia) N Djokovic (Serbia) V Troicki	6	6
(Spain) F López (Spain) F Verdasco	7^{7}	6
(Russia) I Andreev (Russia) M Safin	6^{3}	4
(Spain) N Almagro (Spain) D Ferrer	6	6^{3}	[8]
(Croatia) M Čilić (Germany) N Kiefer	4	7^{7}	[10]
WC	(France) M Gicquel (France) P-H Mathieu	7^{7}	6
(Argentina) L Arnold Ker (Uruguay) P Cuevas	6^{5}	3

Second round
8	(South Africa) J Coetzee (Australia) J Kerr	4	4
(Serbia) N Djokovic (Serbia) V Troicki	6	6
(Spain) F López (Spain) F Verdasco	4	4
4	(India) M Bhupathi (The Bahamas) M Knowles	6	6
5	(Brazil) B Soares (Zimbabwe) K Ullyett	4	6	[7]
(Croatia) M Čilić (Germany) N Kiefer	6	1	[10]
WC	(France) M Gicquel (France) P-H Mathieu	3	7^{7}	[4]
2	(Canada) D Nestor (Serbia) N Zimonjić	6	6^{5}	[10]

Quarterfinals
(Serbia) N Djokovic (Serbia) V Troicki	6	4	[12]
4	(India) M Bhupathi (The Bahamas) M Knowles	4	6	[10]
(Croatia) M Čilić (Germany) N Kiefer	7^{7}	4	[8]
2	(Canada) D Nestor (Serbia) N Zimonjić	6^{3}	6	[10]

Semifinals
(Serbia) N Djokovic (Serbia) V Troicki	6	1	[5]
2	(Canada) D Nestor (Serbia) N Zimonjić	3	6	[10]
