= 2005 Monte Carlo Masters – Doubles =

Doubles
- 2005 Monte Carlo Masters

Final
- Champion: (India) Leander Paes (Serbia and Montenegro) Nenad Zimonjić
- Runner-up: (United States) Bob Bryan (United States) Mike Bryan
- Score: w/o

Events
Singles	Doubles
← 2004 ·	Monte Carlo Masters	· 2006 →

Tim Henman and Nenad Zimonjić were the defending champions. They were both present but did not compete together.
Henman partnered with Yves Allegro and Zimonjić with Leander Paes.

Leander Paes and Nenad Zimonjić won in the finals by a walkover against Bob Bryan and Mike Bryan

== Seeds ==
All seeds receive a bye into the second round.

1. (The Bahamas) Mark Knowles / (Canada) Daniel Nestor (quarterfinals)
2. (Sweden) Jonas Björkman / (Belarus) Max Mirnyi (second round)
3. (United States) Bob Bryan / (United States) Mike Bryan (finals, withdrew)
4. (Australia) Wayne Arthurs / (Australia) Paul Hanley (semifinals)
5. (India) Leander Paes / (Serbia and Montenegro) Nenad Zimonjić (champions)
6. (France) Michaël Llodra / (France) Fabrice Santoro (semifinals)
7. (Czech Republic) Cyril Suk / (Czech Republic) Pavel Vízner (second round)
8. (Sweden) Simon Aspelin / (Australia) Todd Perry (second round)

== Draw ==
=== Key ===
- Q = Qualifier
- WC = Wild card
- LL = Lucky loser
- Alt = Alternate
- SE = Special exempt
- PR = Protected ranking
- ITF = ITF entry
- JE = Junior exempt
- w/o = Walkover
- r = Retired
- d = Defaulted
- SR = Special ranking

=== Finals ===
Semifinals
6	(France) Michaël Llodra (France) Fabrice Santoro	0	4
3	(United States) Bob Bryan (United States) Mike Bryan	6	6
4	(Australia) Wayne Arthurs (Australia) Paul Hanley	3	4
5	(India) Leander Paes (Serbia and Montenegro) Nenad Zimonjić	6	6

Final
3	(United States) Bob Bryan (United States) Mike Bryan
5	(India) Leander Paes (Serbia and Montenegro) Nenad Zimonjić	w/o

=== Top half ===
First round
WC	(Italy) D Bracciali (Italy) G Galimberti	6	7^{7}
(Austria) J Knowle (Spain) F López	1	6^{2}
(Argentina) L Arnold (United States) J Palmer	4	1
(Belgium) X Malisse (Belgium) O Rochus	6	6
(Argentina) G Cañas (Argentina) JI Chela	4	6	3
(Russia) N Davydenko (Czech Republic) J Novák	6	3	6
(Croatia) M Ančić (Croatia) I Ljubičić	6	4	6
(Czech Republic) F Čermák (Czech Republic) L Friedl	3	6	4

Second round
1	(The Bahamas) M Knowles (Canada) D Nestor	6	6
WC	(Italy) D Bracciali (Italy) G Galimberti	1	4
(Belgium) X Malisse (Belgium) O Rochus	4	4
6	(France) M Llodra (France) F Santoro	6	6
3	(United States) B Bryan (United States) M Bryan	6	6
(Russia) N Davydenko (Czech Republic) J Novák	0	1
(Croatia) M Ančić (Croatia) I Ljubičić	6	6
7	(Czech Republic) C Suk (Czech Republic) P Vízner	4	1

Quarterfinals
1	(The Bahamas) M Knowles (Canada) D Nestor	6^{4}	6	4
6	(France) M Llodra (France) F Santoro	7^{7}	1	6
3	(United States) B Bryan (United States) M Bryan	6	6
(Croatia) M Ančić (Croatia) I Ljubičić	2	1

Semifinals
6	(France) M Llodra (France) F Santoro	0	4
3	(United States) B Bryan (United States) M Bryan	6	6

=== Bottom half ===
First round
(India) M Bhupathi (Chile) F González	6	6
(Slovakia) D Hrbatý (Russia) M Safin	3	3
(Switzerland) Y Allegro (United Kingdom) T Henman	3	1
(Argentina) M Hood (Germany) M Kohlmann	6	6
WC	(France) R Gasquet (France) G Monfils	5	5
(Argentina) G Etlis (Argentina) M Rodríguez	7	7
(Czech Republic) M Damm (Czech Republic) R Štěpánek	6	6
(France) J Benneteau (France) N Mahut	4	0

Second round
8	(Sweden) S Aspelin (Australia) T Perry	6^{3}	3
(India) M Bhupathi (Chile) F González	7^{7}	6
(Argentina) M Hood (Germany) M Kohlmann	6^{2}	4
4	(Australia) W Arthurs (Australia) P Hanley	7^{7}	6
5	(India) L Paes (Serbia and Montenegro) N Zimonjić	6	6
(Argentina) G Etlis (Argentina) M Rodríguez	1	1
(Czech Republic) M Damm (Czech Republic) R Štěpánek	7	6
2	(Sweden) J Björkman (Belarus) M Mirnyi	5	3

Quarterfinals
(India) M Bhupathi (Chile) F González	7	3	3
4	(Australia) W Arthurs (Australia) P Hanley	5	6	6
5	(India) L Paes (Serbia and Montenegro) N Zimonjić	6	6
(Czech Republic) M Damm (Czech Republic) R Štěpánek	3	3

Semifinals
4	(Australia) W Arthurs (Australia) P Hanley	3	4
5	(India) L Paes (Serbia and Montenegro) N Zimonjić	6	6
