= 2009 Italian Open – Men's doubles =

Men's doubles
- 2009 Italian Open

Final
- Champions: (Canada) Daniel Nestor (Serbia) Nenad Zimonjić
- Runners-up: (United States) Bob Bryan (United States) Mike Bryan
- Score: 7–6(5), 6–3

Events
Singles	men	women
Doubles	men	women
← 2008 ·	Italian Open	· 2010 →

The 2009 Italian Open – Men's doubles was a tennis tournament played on outdoor clay courts.

Bob Bryan and Mike Bryan were the defending champions, and Daniel Nestor and Nenad Zimonjić defeated them in the final, 7-6 (9–7), 6-7 (3–7), 7-6 (7–3), 6–3.

== Seeds ==
All seeds receive a bye into the second round.

1. (United States) Bob Bryan / (United States) Mike Bryan (final)
2. (Canada) Daniel Nestor / (Serbia) Nenad Zimonjić (champions)
3. (Czech Republic) Lukáš Dlouhý / (India) Leander Paes (quarterfinals)
4. (India) Mahesh Bhupathi / (The Bahamas) Mark Knowles (semifinals)
5. (Brazil) Bruno Soares / (Zimbabwe) Kevin Ullyett (semifinals)
6. (Poland) Mariusz Fyrstenberg / (Poland) Marcin Matkowski (quarterfinals)
7. (Belarus) Max Mirnyi / (Israel) Andy Ram (quarterfinals)
8. (South Africa) Jeff Coetzee / (Australia) Jordan Kerr (quarterfinals)

== Draw ==
=== Key ===
- Q = Qualifier
- WC = Wild card
- LL = Lucky loser
- Alt = Alternate
- SE = Special exempt
- PR = Protected ranking
- ITF = ITF entry
- JE = Junior exempt
- w/o = Walkover
- r = Retired
- d = Defaulted
- SR = Special ranking

=== Finals ===
Semifinals
1	(United States) Bob Bryan (United States) Mike Bryan	6	3	[10]
5	(Brazil) Bruno Soares (Zimbabwe) Kevin Ullyett	1	6	[7]
4	(India) Mahesh Bhupathi (The Bahamas) Mark Knowles	4	7	[8]
2	(Canada) Daniel Nestor (Serbia) Nenad Zimonjić	6	6^{6}	[10]

Final
1	(United States) Bob Bryan (United States) Mike Bryan	6^{5}	3
2	(Canada) Daniel Nestor (Serbia) Nenad Zimonjić	7	6

=== Top half ===
First round
(Serbia) N Djokovic (Austria) J Melzer	6	6
(France) J Chardy (France) G Simon	2	1
(Spain) A Montañés (Spain) T Robredo	2	6^{8}
WC	(Italy) D Bracciali (Italy) P Starace	6	7
(Croatia) I Karlović (Serbia) D Vemić	7	5	[10]
(Czech Republic) F Čermák (Australia) S Huss	6^{6}	7	[8]
(Sweden) R Lindstedt (Sweden) R Söderling	5	2
(Brazil) M Melo (Brazil) A Sá	7	6

Second round
1	(United States) B Bryan (United States) M Bryan	6	6
(Serbia) N Djokovic (Austria) J Melzer	4	3
WC	(Italy) D Bracciali (Italy) P Starace	5	3
7	(Belarus) M Mirnyi (Israel) A Ram	7	6
3	(Czech Republic) L Dlouhý (India) L Paes	6	6
(Croatia) I Karlović (Serbia) D Vemić	1	1
(Brazil) M Melo (Brazil) A Sá	2	4
5	(Brazil) B Soares (Zimbabwe) K Ullyett	6	6

Quarterfinals
1	(United States) B Bryan (United States) M Bryan	4	6	[11]
7	(Belarus) M Mirnyi (Israel) A Ram	6	4	[9]
3	(Czech Republic) L Dlouhý (India) L Paes	5	3
5	(Brazil) B Soares (Zimbabwe) K Ullyett	7	6

Semifinals
1	(United States) B Bryan (United States) M Bryan	6	3	[10]
5	(Brazil) B Soares (Zimbabwe) K Ullyett	1	6	[7]

=== Bottom half ===
First round
(United Kingdom) R Hutchins (United Kingdom) A Murray	4	4
(France) J Benneteau (France) J-W Tsonga	6	6
(Italy) S Bolelli (Italy) A Seppi	w/o
(Spain) F López (Spain) F Verdasco
WC	(Italy) F Cipolla (Italy) F Fognini	7	6
(Czech Republic) T Berdych (Germany) N Kiefer	6^{2}	4
(United States) J Blake (United States) M Fish	7	6
(Sweden) S Aspelin (South Africa) W Moodie	6^{4}	1

Second round
6	(Poland) M Fyrstenberg (Poland) M Matkowski	7	6
(France) J Benneteau (France) J-W Tsonga	5	3
(Italy) S Bolelli (Italy) A Seppi	6^{5}	6	[3]
4	(India) M Bhupathi (The Bahamas) M Knowles	7	2	[10]
8	(South Africa) J Coetzee (Australia) J Kerr	6	7
WC	(Italy) F Cipolla (Italy) F Fognini	1	5
(United States) J Blake (United States) M Fish	3	6	[6]
2	(Canada) D Nestor (Serbia) N Zimonjić	6	4	[10]

Quarterfinals
6	(Poland) M Fyrstenberg (Poland) M Matkowski	3	4
4	(India) M Bhupathi (The Bahamas) M Knowles	6	6
8	(South Africa) J Coetzee (Australia) J Kerr	4	4
2	(Canada) D Nestor (Serbia) N Zimonjić	6	6

Semifinals
4	(India) M Bhupathi (The Bahamas) M Knowles	4	7	[8]
2	(Canada) D Nestor (Serbia) N Zimonjić	6	6^{6}	[10]
