= 2006 Monte Carlo Masters – Doubles =

Doubles
- 2006 Monte Carlo Masters

Final
- Champions: (Sweden) Jonas Björkman (Belarus) Max Mirnyi
- Runners-up: (France) Fabrice Santoro (Serbia and Montenegro) Nenad Zimonjić
- Score: 6–2, 7–6^{(7–2)}

Events
Singles	Doubles
← 2005 ·	Monte Carlo Masters	· 2007 →

Leander Paes and Nenad Zimonjić were the defending champions, but they chose not to participate together.
Paes partnered up with Martin Damm, but they were eliminated by Mahesh Bhupathi and Radek Štěpánek in the second round.
Zimonjić played alongside Fabrice Santoro and reached the final, where they lost to Jonas Björkman and Max Mirnyi.

== Seeds ==
All seeds received a bye into the second round.

1. (Sweden) Jonas Björkman / (Belarus) Max Mirnyi (champions)
2. (The Bahamas) Mark Knowles / (Canada) Daniel Nestor (second round)
3. (France) Fabrice Santoro / (Serbia and Montenegro) Nenad Zimonjić (final)
4. (Czech Republic) Martin Damm / (India) Leander Paes (second round)
5. (Israel) Jonathan Erlich / (Israel) Andy Ram (second round)
6. (Sweden) Simon Aspelin / (Australia) Todd Perry (quarterfinals)
7. (Czech Republic) Leoš Friedl / (Austria) Julian Knowle (second round)
8. (Australia) Stephen Huss / (Czech Republic) Pavel Vízner (second round)

== Draw ==
=== Key ===
- Q = Qualifier
- WC = Wild card
- LL = Lucky loser
- Alt = Alternate
- SE = Special exempt
- PR = Protected ranking
- ITF = ITF entry
- JE = Junior exempt
- w/o = Walkover
- r = Retired
- d = Defaulted
- SR = Special ranking

=== Finals ===
Semifinals
1	(Sweden) Jonas Björkman (Belarus) Max Mirnyi	6	7
(India) Mahesh Bhupathi (Czech Republic) Radek Štěpánek	3	5
3	(France) Fabrice Santoro (Serbia and Montenegro) Nenad Zimonjić	6	6
(Argentina) José Acasuso (Argentina) Sebastián Prieto	3	1

Final
1	(Sweden) Jonas Björkman (Belarus) Max Mirnyi	6	7^{7}
3	(France) Fabrice Santoro (Serbia and Montenegro) Nenad Zimonjić	3	6^{2}

=== Top half ===
First round
(Argentina) G Coria (Argentina) M García	3	4
(South Africa) C Haggard (Russia) D Tursunov	6	6
(Belgium) X Malisse (Belgium) O Rochus	6	3	[8]
(Poland) M Fyrstenberg (Poland) M Matkowski	3	6	[10]
(Chile) F González (Chile) N Massú	6	4	[2]
(India) M Bhupathi (Czech Republic) R Štěpánek	3	6	[10]
(Czech Republic) J Levinský (Russia) Marat Safin	3	6	[6]
(Switzerland) Y Allegro (Switzerland) R Federer	6	3	[10]

Second round
1	(Sweden) J Björkman (Belarus) M Mirnyi	6	6
(South Africa) C Haggard (Russia) D Tursunov	3	1
(Poland) M Fyrstenberg (Poland) M Matkowski	7	4	[10]
5	(Israel) J Erlich (Israel) A Ram	6^{1}	6	[4]
4	(Czech Republic) M Damm (India) L Paes	1	4
(India) M Bhupathi (Czech Republic) R Štěpánek	6	6
(Switzerland) Y Allegro (Switzerland) R Federer	6	6
8	(Australia) S Huss (Czech Republic) P Vízner	1	2

Quarterfinals
1	(Sweden) J Björkman (Belarus) M Mirnyi	6	6
(Poland) M Fyrstenberg (Poland) M Matkowski	3	4
(India) M Bhupathi (Czech Republic) R Štěpánek	6	7
(Switzerland) Y Allegro (Switzerland) R Federer	4	5

Semifinals
1	(Sweden) J Björkman (Belarus) M Mirnyi	6	7
(India) M Bhupathi (Czech Republic) R Štěpánek	3	5

=== Bottom half ===
First round
Alt	(Italy) S Bolelli (Italy) A Seppi	7	0	[10]
(Russia) I Andreev (Russia) N Davydenko	5	6	[6]
(Czech Republic) T Berdych (Finland) J Nieminen	2^{r}
WC	(United Kingdom) T Henman (United Kingdom) A Murray	3
WC	(France) A Clément (France) M Llodra	6	6
(Spain) D Ferrer (Spain) T Robredo	3	4
(Slovakia) D Hrbatý (Czech Republic) C Suk	6^{3}	3
(Argentina) J Acasuso (Argentina) S Prieto	7^{7}	6

Second round
7	(Czech Republic) L Friedl (Austria) J Knowle	4	7	[8]
Alt	(Italy) S Bolelli (Italy) A Seppi	6	5	[10]
WC	(United Kingdom) T Henman (United Kingdom) A Murray	6	3	[8]
3	(France) F Santoro (Serbia and Montenegro) N Zimonjić	3	6	[10]
6	(Sweden) S Aspelin (Australia) T Perry	3	6	[10]
WC	(France) A Clément (France) M Llodra	6	3	[7]
(Argentina) J Acasuso (Argentina) S Prieto	6	6
2	(The Bahamas) M Knowles (Canada) D Nestor	4	4

Quarterfinals
Alt	(Italy) S Bolelli (Italy) A Seppi	3	4
3	(France) F Santoro (Serbia and Montenegro) N Zimonjić	6	6
6	(Sweden) S Aspelin (Australia) T Perry	5	4
(Argentina) J Acasuso (Argentina) S Prieto	7	6

Semifinals
3	(France) F Santoro (Serbia and Montenegro) N Zimonjić	6	6
(Argentina) J Acasuso (Argentina) S Prieto	3	1
