= 2008 Mutua Madrileña Masters Madrid – Doubles =

Doubles
- 2008 Mutua Madrileña Masters Madrid

Final
- Champions: (Poland) Mariusz Fyrstenberg (Poland) Marcin Matkowski
- Runners-up: (India) Mahesh Bhupathi (The Bahamas) Mark Knowles
- Score: 6–4, 6–2

Events
Singles	Doubles
- Mutua Madrileña Masters Madrid

Bob Bryan and Mike Bryan were the defending champions, but lost in the quarterfinals to Jonas Björkman and Kevin Ullyett.

Mariusz Fyrstenberg and Marcin Matkowski won in the final 6–4, 6–2, against Mahesh Bhupathi and Mark Knowles.

== Seeds ==
All seeds receive a bye into the second round.

1. (United States) Bob Bryan / (United States) Mike Bryan (quarterfinals)
2. (Canada) Daniel Nestor / (Serbia) Nenad Zimonjić (quarterfinals)
3. (Czech Republic) Lukáš Dlouhý / (India) Leander Paes (second round)
4. (India) Mahesh Bhupathi / (The Bahamas) Mark Knowles (final)
5. (Sweden) Jonas Björkman / (Zimbabwe) Kevin Ullyett (semifinals)
6. (Sweden) Simon Aspelin / (Austria) Julian Knowle (quarterfinals)
7. (Poland) Mariusz Fyrstenberg / (Poland) Marcin Matkowski (champions)
8. (South Africa) Jeff Coetzee / (South Africa) Wesley Moodie (semifinals)

== Draw ==
Key

- Q = Qualifier
- WC = Wild card
- LL = Lucky loser
- Alt = Alternate
- ITF = ITF entry
- PR = Protected ranking
- SR = Special ranking
- SE = Special exempt
- JE = Junior exempt
- JR = Junior Accelerator Programme entrant
- CO = College Accelerator Programme entrant
- NG = Next Gen Accelerator Program entrant
- w/o = Walkover
- r = Retired
- d = Defaulted

=== Finals ===
Semifinals
5	(Sweden) Jonas Björkman (Zimbabwe) Kevin Ullyett	2	4
4	(India) Mahesh Bhupathi (The Bahamas) Mark Knowles	6	6
8	(South Africa) Jeff Coetzee (South Africa) Wesley Moodie	7	6^{5}	[10]
7	(Poland) Mariusz Fyrstenberg (Poland) Marcin Matkowski	6^{4}	7	[12]

Final
4	(India) Mahesh Bhupathi (The Bahamas) Mark Knowles	4	2
7	(Poland) Mariusz Fyrstenberg (Poland) Marcin Matkowski	6	6

=== Top half ===
First round
WC	(Italy) S Bolelli (Italy) A Seppi	6	3	[2]
(Brazil) M Melo (Brazil) A Sá	4	6	[10]
(France) G Monfils (France) G Simon	3	2
(Czech Republic) T Berdych (Germany) N Kiefer	6	6
(Spain) C Moyá (Spain) R Nadal	4	7	[10]
(United States) J Blake (United States) M Fish	6	6^{5}	[5]
(Argentina) L Arnold Ker (Argentina) D Nalbandian	6	6
(Czech Republic) M Damm (Czech Republic) P Vízner	4	4

Second round
1	(United States) B Bryan (United States) M Bryan	6	6
(Brazil) M Melo (Brazil) A Sá	1	4
(Czech Republic) T Berdych (Germany) N Kiefer	3	6	[7]
5	(Sweden) J Björkman (Zimbabwe) K Ullyett	6	3	[10]
4	(India) M Bhupathi (The Bahamas) M Knowles	w/o
(Spain) C Moyá (Spain) R Nadal
(Argentina) L Arnold Ker (Argentina) D Nalbandian	6^{7}	6^{9}
6	(Sweden) S Aspelin (Austria) J Knowle	7	7

Quarterfinals
1	(United States) B Bryan (United States) M Bryan	4	4
5	(Sweden) J Björkman (Zimbabwe) K Ullyett	6	6
4	(India) M Bhupathi (The Bahamas) M Knowles	6	7
6	(Sweden) S Aspelin (Austria) J Knowle	3	5

Semifinals
5	(Sweden) J Björkman (Zimbabwe) K Ullyett	2	4
4	(India) M Bhupathi (The Bahamas) M Knowles	6	6

=== Bottom half ===
First round
(Argentina) A Calleri (Spain) D Ferrer	3	4
(Belarus) M Mirnyi (Spain) T Robredo	6	6
(Israel) A Ram (Russia) M Youzhny	2	2
WC	(Spain) P Andújar (Spain) M Granollers	6	6
(France) A Clément (France) M Llodra	6	6
(United Kingdom) A Murray (United Kingdom) J Murray	4	3
(Spain) F López (Spain) F Verdasco	6	6
(Chile) F González (Germany) C Kas	4	3

Second round
8	(South Africa) J Coetzee (South Africa) W Moodie	6^{5}	7	[10]
(Belarus) M Mirnyi (Spain) T Robredo	7	6^{4}	[8]
WC	(Spain) P Andújar (Spain) M Granollers	6	3	[10]
3	(Czech Republic) L Dlouhý (India) L Paes	1	6	7
7	(Poland) M Fyrstenberg (Poland) M Matkowski	7	7
(France) A Clément (France) M Llodra	5	6^{14}
(Spain) F López (Spain) F Verdasco	6^{3}	4
2	(Canada) D Nestor (Serbia) N Zimonjić	7	6

Quarterfinals
8	(South Africa) J Coetzee (South Africa) W Moodie	7	6
WC	(Spain) P Andújar (Spain) M Granollers	6^{5}	3
7	(Poland) M Fyrstenberg (Poland) M Matkowski	6	3	[11]
2	(Canada) D Nestor (Serbia) N Zimonjić	3	6	[9]

Semifinals
8	(South Africa) J Coetzee (South Africa) W Moodie	7	6^{5}	[10]
7	(Poland) M Fyrstenberg (Poland) M Matkowski	6^{4}	7	[12]
