= 2008 Italian Open – Men's doubles =

Men's doubles
- 2008 Italian Open

Final
- Champions: (United States) Bob Bryan (United States) Mike Bryan
- Runners-up: (Canada) Daniel Nestor (Serbia) Nenad Zimonjić
- Score: 3–6, 6–4, [10–8]

Events
Singles	men	women
Doubles	men	women
← 2007 ·	Italian Open	· 2009 →

Fabrice Santoro and Nenad Zimonjić were the defending champions. They were both present but did not compete together.
Santoro partnered with Richard Gasquet, but lost in the semifinals to Zimonjic and partner Daniel Nestor, who lost in the final.

Bob Bryan and Mike Bryan won in the final 3–6, 6–4, [10–8], against Daniel Nestor and Nenad Zimonjić.

== Seeds ==
All seeds receive a bye into the second round.

1. (United States) Bob Bryan / (United States) Mike Bryan (champions)
2. (Canada) Daniel Nestor / (Serbia) Nenad Zimonjić (final)
3. (Israel) Jonathan Erlich / (Israel) Andy Ram (second round)
4. (India) Mahesh Bhupathi / (The Bahamas) Mark Knowles (second round)
5. (Sweden) Simon Aspelin / (Austria) Julian Knowle (second round)
6. (France) Arnaud Clément / (France) Michaël Llodra (second round)
7. (Sweden) Jonas Björkman / (Zimbabwe) Kevin Ullyett (semifinals)
8. (Australia) Paul Hanley / (India) Leander Paes (second round)

== Draw ==
=== Key ===
- Q = Qualifier
- WC = Wild card
- LL = Lucky loser
- Alt = Alternate
- SE = Special exempt
- PR = Protected ranking
- ITF = ITF entry
- JE = Junior exempt
- w/o = Walkover
- r = Retired
- d = Defaulted
- SR = Special ranking

=== Finals ===
Semifinals
1	(United States) Bob Bryan (United States) Mike Bryan	6	6
7	(Sweden) Jonas Björkman (Zimbabwe) Kevin Ullyett	2	1
(France) Richard Gasquet (France) Fabrice Santoro	3	6	[8]
2	(Canada) Daniel Nestor (Serbia) Nenad Zimonjić	6	3	[10]

Final
1	(United States) Bob Bryan (United States) Mike Bryan	3	6	[10]
2	(Canada) Daniel Nestor (Serbia) Nenad Zimonjić	6	4	[8]

=== Top half ===
First round
(Russia) D Tursunov (Switzerland) S Wawrinka	5	4
(Belarus) M Mirnyi (United Kingdom) J Murray	7	6
(Croatia) I Karlović (Netherlands) R Wassen	2	5
WC	(Italy) F Cipolla (Italy) P Starace	6	7
(Australia) J Kerr (Finland) J Nieminen	4	6	[10]
(France) N Mahut (France) P-H Mathieu	6	4	[8]
(South Africa) J Coetzee (South Africa) W Moodie	w/o
(Argentina) J Acasuso (Chile) F González

Second round
1	(United States) B Bryan (United States) M Bryan	6	6
(Belarus) M Mirnyi (United Kingdom) J Murray	4	4
WC	(Italy) F Cipolla (Italy) P Starace	6	6^{4}	[10]
6	(France) A Clément (France) M Llodra	3	7	[8]
3	(Israel) J Erlich (Israel) A Ram	6^{6}	3
(Australia) J Kerr (Finland) J Nieminen	7	6
(South Africa) J Coetzee (South Africa) W Moodie	4	2
7	(Sweden) J Björkman (Zimbabwe) K Ullyett	6	6

Quarterfinals
1	(United States) B Bryan (United States) M Bryan	6	6
WC	(Italy) F Cipolla (Italy) P Starace	1	4
(Australia) J Kerr (Finland) J Nieminen	4	6	[6]
7	(Sweden) J Björkman (Zimbabwe) K Ullyett	6	4	[10]

Semifinals
1	(United States) B Bryan (United States) M Bryan	6	6
7	(Sweden) J Björkman (Zimbabwe) K Ullyett	2	1

=== Bottom half ===
First round
(France) R Gasquet (France) F Santoro	6	7
WC	(Italy) S Bolelli (Italy) A Seppi	3	5
(Spain) F López (Spain) F Verdasco	6	7
(Russia) I Andreev (Croatia) I Ljubičić	4	6^{3}
(Peru) L Horna (Argentina) J Mónaco	6^{2}	7	[8]
(Poland) M Fyrstenberg (Poland) M Matkowski	7	6^{4}	[10]
(Brazil) M Melo (Brazil) A Sá	6^{3}	6	[7]
(United States) J Blake (United States) M Fish	7	2	[10]

Second round
5	(Sweden) S Aspelin (Austria) J Knowle	3	0
(France) R Gasquet (France) F Santoro	6	6
(Spain) F López (Spain) F Verdasco	6^{4}	6	[10]
4	(India) M Bhupathi (The Bahamas) M Knowles	7	4	[7]
8	(Australia) P Hanley (India) L Paes	6	3	[6]
(Poland) M Fyrstenberg (Poland) M Matkowski	4	6	[10]
(United States) J Blake (United States) M Fish	6	5	[9]
2	(Canada) D Nestor (Serbia) N Zimonjić	2	7	[11]

Quarterfinals
(France) R Gasquet (France) F Santoro	6	6
(Spain) F López (Spain) F Verdasco	3	4
(Poland) M Fyrstenberg (Poland) M Matkowski	4	1
2	(Canada) D Nestor (Serbia) N Zimonjić	6	6

Semifinals
(France) R Gasquet (France) F Santoro	3	6	[8]
2	(Canada) D Nestor (Serbia) N Zimonjić	6	3	[10]
