= 2008 Rogers Masters – Doubles =

Doubles
- 2008 Rogers Masters

Final
- Champions: (Canada) Daniel Nestor (Serbia) Nenad Zimonjić
- Runners-up: (United States) Bob Bryan (United States) Mike Bryan
- Score: 6–2, 4–6, [10–6]

Details
- Draw: 28
- Seeds: 8

Events
Singles	Doubles
- Rogers Masters

Mahesh Bhupathi and Pavel Vízner were the defending champions. They were both present but did not compete together.
Bhupathi partnered with Mark Knowles, but lost in the quarterfinals to Lukáš Dlouhý and Leander Paes
Vízner partnered with Martin Damm, but lost in the second round to Mario Ančić and Jeff Coetzee.

Daniel Nestor and Nenad Zimonjić won in the final 6–2, 4–6, [10–6], against Bob Bryan and Mike Bryan.

== Seeds ==
All seeds receive a bye into the second round.

1. (United States) Bob Bryan / (United States) Mike Bryan (final)
2. (Canada) Daniel Nestor / (Serbia) Nenad Zimonjić (champions)
3. (Israel) Jonathan Erlich / (Israel) Andy Ram (second round)
4. (India) Mahesh Bhupathi / (The Bahamas) Mark Knowles (quarterfinals)
5. (Sweden) Jonas Björkman / (Zimbabwe) Kevin Ullyett (quarterfinals)
6. (Sweden) Simon Aspelin / (Austria) Julian Knowle (second round)
7. (Czech Republic) Lukáš Dlouhý / (India) Leander Paes (semifinals)
8. (Czech Republic) Martin Damm / (Czech Republic) Pavel Vízner (second round)

== Draw ==
Key

- Q = Qualifier
- WC = Wild card
- LL = Lucky loser
- Alt = Alternate
- ITF = ITF entry
- PR = Protected ranking
- SR = Special ranking
- SE = Special exempt
- JE = Junior exempt
- JR = Junior Accelerator Programme entrant
- CO = College Accelerator Programme entrant
- NG = Next Gen Accelerator Program entrant
- w/o = Walkover
- r = Retired
- d = Defaulted

=== Finals ===
Semifinals
1	(United States) Bob Bryan (United States) Mike Bryan	6	6
(Australia) Paul Hanley (Australia) Jordan Kerr	3	4
7	(Czech Republic) Lukáš Dlouhý (India) Leander Paes	3	6^{5}
2	(Canada) Daniel Nestor (Serbia) Nenad Zimonjić	6	7^{7}

Final
1	(United States) Bob Bryan (United States) Mike Bryan	2	6	[6]
2	(Canada) Daniel Nestor (Serbia) Nenad Zimonjić	6	4	[10]

=== Top half ===
First round
(Poland) M Fyrstenberg (Poland) M Matkowski	2	6^{7}
(Spain) F López (Spain) F Verdasco	6	7^{9}
(Croatia) M Ančić (South Africa) J Coetzee	6	6
(Chile) F González (Brazil) A Sá	3	2
(Australia) P Hanley (Australia) J Kerr	6	7
WC	(Canada) F Dancevic (United States) J Levine	3	5
(Russia) I Andreev (Russia) N Davydenko	3	6	[10]
(Spain) R Nadal (Spain) T Robredo	6	3	[7]

Second round
1	(United States) B Bryan (United States) M Bryan	7	6
(Spain) F López (Spain) F Verdasco	5	2
(Croatia) M Ančić (South Africa) J Coetzee	6	6
8	(Czech Republic) M Damm (Czech Republic) P Vízner	4	3
3	(Israel) J Erlich (Israel) A Ram	3	2
(Australia) P Hanley (Australia) J Kerr	6	6
(Russia) I Andreev (Russia) N Davydenko
5	(Sweden) J Björkman (Zimbabwe) K Ullyett	w/o

Quarterfinals
1	(United States) B Bryan (United States) M Bryan	6	7
(Croatia) M Ančić (South Africa) J Coetzee	3	5
(Australia) P Hanley (Australia) J Kerr	6	3	[10]
5	(Sweden) J Björkman (Zimbabwe) K Ullyett	4	6	[5]

Semifinals
1	(United States) B Bryan (United States) M Bryan	6	6
(Australia) P Hanley (Australia) J Kerr	3	4

=== Bottom half ===
First round
WC	(France) J Benneteau (Canada) F Niemeyer	4	4
(Switzerland) R Federer (Switzerland) S Wawrinka	6	6
(France) A Clément (France) M Llodra	6^{6}	2
(United States) M Fish (United States) A Roddick	7^{8}	6
(France) P-H Mathieu (Russia) M Youzhny	6	6
(Spain) D Ferrer (Finland) J Nieminen	2	2
(United Kingdom) A Murray (United Kingdom) J Murray	7^{7}	6
(France) R Gasquet (France) N Mahut	6^{4}	2

Second round
7	(Czech Republic) L Dlouhý (India) L Paes	6	6
(Switzerland) R Federer (Switzerland) S Wawrinka	4	4
(United States) M Fish (United States) A Roddick
4	(India) M Bhupathi (The Bahamas) M Knowles	w/o
6	(Sweden) S Aspelin (Austria) J Knowle	4	r
(France) P-H Mathieu (Russia) M Youzhny	6
(United Kingdom) A Murray (United Kingdom) J Murray	6^{3}	4
2	(Canada) D Nestor (Serbia) N Zimonjić	7^{7}	6

Quarterfinals
7	(Czech Republic) L Dlouhý (India) L Paes	6	3	[10]
4	(India) M Bhupathi (The Bahamas) M Knowles	4	6	[5]
(France) P-H Mathieu (Russia) M Youzhny	6^{4}	4
2	(Canada) D Nestor (Serbia) N Zimonjić	7^{7}	6

Semifinals
7	(Czech Republic) L Dlouhý (India) L Paes	3	6^{5}
2	(Canada) D Nestor (Serbia) N Zimonjić	6	7^{7}
