= 2008 Masters Series Monte-Carlo – Doubles =

Doubles
- 2008 Masters Series Monte-Carlo

Final
- Champions: (Spain) Rafael Nadal (Spain) Tommy Robredo
- Runners-up: (India) Mahesh Bhupathi (The Bahamas) Mark Knowles
- Score: 6–3, 6–3

Events
Singles	Doubles
← 2007 ·	Masters Series Monte-Carlo	· 2009 →

Bob Bryan and Mike Bryan were the defending champions, but lost in the quarterfinals to Jeff Coetzee and Wesley Moodie.

Rafael Nadal and Tommy Robredo won in the final 6–3, 6–3, against Mahesh Bhupathi and Mark Knowles.

== Seeds ==
All seeds receive a bye into the second round.

1. (United States) Bob Bryan / (United States) Mike Bryan (quarterfinals)
2. (Israel) Jonathan Erlich / (Israel) Andy Ram (quarterfinals)
3. (Canada) Daniel Nestor / (Serbia) Nenad Zimonjić (second round)
4. (India) Mahesh Bhupathi / (The Bahamas) Mark Knowles (final)
5. (Sweden) Simon Aspelin / (Austria) Julian Knowle (quarterfinals)
6. (Czech Republic) Lukáš Dlouhý / (Czech Republic) Pavel Vízner (second round)
7. (France) Arnaud Clément / (France) Michaël Llodra (second round)
8. (Sweden) Jonas Björkman / (Zimbabwe) Kevin Ullyett (semifinals)

== Draw ==
=== Key ===
- Q = Qualifier
- WC = Wild card
- LL = Lucky loser
- Alt = Alternate
- SE = Special exempt
- PR = Protected ranking
- ITF = ITF entry
- JE = Junior exempt
- w/o = Walkover
- r = Retired
- d = Defaulted
- SR = Special ranking

=== Finals ===
Semifinals
(South Africa) Jeff Coetzee (South Africa) Wesley Moodie	0	5
4	(India) Mahesh Bhupathi (The Bahamas) Mark Knowles	6	7
(Spain) Rafael Nadal (Spain) Tommy Robredo	5	7^{8}	[10]
8	(Sweden) Jonas Björkman (Zimbabwe) Kevin Ullyett	7	6^{6}	7

Final
4	(India) Mahesh Bhupathi (The Bahamas) Mark Knowles	3	3
(Spain) Rafael Nadal (Spain) Tommy Robredo	6	6

=== Top half ===
First round
(France) P-H Mathieu (France) F Santoro	6	6^{3}	[9]
WC	(France) J Benneteau (France) N Mahut	2	7^{7}	[11]
(South Africa) J Coetzee (South Africa) W Moodie	6	6
(Argentina) J Acasuso (Spain) D Ferrer	3	4
(Brazil) M Melo (Brazil) A Sá	6	6
(Germany) C Kas (Finland) J Nieminen	2	3
(Serbia) N Djokovic (Czech Republic) R Štěpánek	6	6
(Australia) J Kerr (Netherlands) R Wassen	4	3

Second round
1	(United States) B Bryan (United States) M Bryan	6	2	[10]
WC	(France) J Benneteau (France) N Mahut	2	6	[8]
(South Africa) J Coetzee (South Africa) W Moodie	7^{7}	6
7	(France) A Clément (France) M Llodra	6^{5}	3
4	(India) M Bhupathi (The Bahamas) M Knowles	6	6
(Brazil) M Melo (Brazil) A Sá	4	3
(Serbia) N Djokovic (Czech Republic) R Štěpánek	2	6^{3}
5	(Sweden) S Aspelin (Austria) J Knowle	6	7^{7}

Quarterfinals
1	(United States) B Bryan (United States) M Bryan	6	4	[8]
(South Africa) J Coetzee (South Africa) W Moodie	4	6	[10]
4	(India) M Bhupathi (The Bahamas) M Knowles	6	6
5	(Sweden) S Aspelin (Austria) J Knowle	2	3

Semifinals
(South Africa) J Coetzee (South Africa) W Moodie	0	5
4	(India) M Bhupathi (The Bahamas) M Knowles	6	7

=== Bottom half ===
First round
(Russia) I Andreev (Croatia) I Ljubičić	6	3	[5]
(Czech Republic) F Čermák (Germany) P Kohlschreiber	3	6	[10]
WC	(Monaco) G Couillard (Monaco) J-R Lisnard	2	1
(Spain) R Nadal (Spain) T Robredo	6	6
(Belarus) M Mirnyi (United Kingdom) J Murray	3	3
(Poland) M Fyrstenberg (Poland) M Matkowski	6	6
(Australia) P Hanley (India) L Paes	6	6
(Argentina) D Nalbandian (Argentina) S Prieto	4	3

Second round
6	(Czech Republic) L Dlouhý (Czech Republic) P Vízner	7	4	[5]
(Czech Republic) F Čermák (Germany) P Kohlschreiber	5	6	[10]
(Spain) R Nadal (Spain) T Robredo	5	6	[10]
3	(Canada) D Nestor (Serbia) N Zimonjić	7	3	[3]
8	(Sweden) J Björkman (Zimbabwe) K Ullyett	6^{7}	7	[10]
(Poland) M Fyrstenberg (Poland) M Matkowski	7^{9}	5	[7]
(Australia) P Hanley (India) L Paes	6	3	[3]
2	(Israel) J Erlich (Israel) A Ram	4	6	[10]

Quarterfinals
(Czech Republic) F Čermák (Germany) P Kohlschreiber	7^{7}	1	[3]
(Spain) R Nadal (Spain) T Robredo	6^{5}	6	[10]
8	(Sweden) J Björkman (Zimbabwe) K Ullyett	6	6
2	(Israel) J Erlich (Israel) A Ram	4	4

Semifinals
(Spain) R Nadal (Spain) T Robredo	5	7^{8}	[10]
8	(Sweden) J Björkman (Zimbabwe) K Ullyett	7	6^{6}	[7]
