= 1994 ATP Championship Series, Single Week =

Men's professional tennis tour

Details
- Duration: February 28 – November 6
- Edition: 5th
- Tournaments: 9

Achievements (singles)
- Most titles: (United States) Pete Sampras (3)
- Most finals: (United States) Andre Agassi (United States) Pete Sampras (3)

The 1994 ATP Championship Series, Single Week was a series of tennis tournaments that was part of the 1994 ATP Tour, the elite tour for professional men's tennis organised by the Association of Tennis Professionals. It formed the tier below the Grand Slam tournaments.

== Results ==
* First-time champion

Masters	Singles champions	Runners-up	Score	Doubles champions	Runners-up	Score
Indian Wells Singles – Doubles	(United States) Pete Sampras	(Czech Republic) Petr Korda	4–6, 6–3, 3–6, 6–3, 6–2	(Canada) Grant Connell*	(Zimbabwe) Byron Black (United States) Jonathan Stark	3–6, 6–1, 7–6
Indian Wells Singles – Doubles	(United States) Pete Sampras	(Czech Republic) Petr Korda	4–6, 6–3, 3–6, 6–3, 6–2	(United States) Patrick Galbraith	(Zimbabwe) Byron Black (United States) Jonathan Stark	3–6, 6–1, 7–6
Miami Singles – Doubles	(United States) Pete Sampras	(United States) Andre Agassi	5–7, 6–3, 6–3	(Netherlands) Jacco Eltingh (Netherlands) Paul Haarhuis	(The Bahamas) Mark Knowles (United States) Jared Palmer	7–6, 7–6
Monte Carlo Singles – Doubles	(Ukraine) Andriy Medvedev*	(Spain) Sergi Bruguera	7–5, 6–1, 6–3	(Sweden) Nicklas Kulti* (Sweden) Magnus Larsson*	(Russia) Yevgeny Kafelnikov (Czech Republic) Daniel Vacek	3–6, 7–6, 6–4
Hamburg Singles – Doubles	(Ukraine) Andriy Medvedev	(Russia) Yevgeny Kafelnikov	6–4, 6–4, 3–6, 6–3	(United States) Scott Melville*	(Sweden) Henrik Holm (Sweden) Anders Järryd	7–6, 6–3
Hamburg Singles – Doubles	(Ukraine) Andriy Medvedev	(Russia) Yevgeny Kafelnikov	6–4, 6–4, 3–6, 6–3	(South Africa) Piet Norval	(Sweden) Henrik Holm (Sweden) Anders Järryd	7–6, 6–3
Rome Singles – Doubles	(United States) Pete Sampras	(Germany) Boris Becker	6–1, 6–2, 6–2	(Russia) Yevgeny Kafelnikov* (Czech Republic) David Rikl*	(South Africa) Wayne Ferreira (Spain) Javier Sánchez	6–1, 7–5
Toronto Singles – Doubles	(United States) Andre Agassi	(Australia) Jason Stoltenberg	6–4, 6–4	(Zimbabwe) Byron Black (United States) Jonathan Stark	(United States) Jared Palmer (United States) Patrick McEnroe	6–4, 6–4
Cincinnati Singles – Doubles	(United States) Michael Chang	(Sweden) Stefan Edberg	6–2, 7–5	(United States) Alex O'Brien* (Australia) Sandon Stolle*	(South Africa) Wayne Ferreira (Australia) Mark Kratzmann	7–6, 3–6, 6–3
Stockholm Singles – Doubles	(Germany) Boris Becker	(Croatia) Goran Ivanišević	4–6, 6–4, 6–3, 7–6^{(7–4)}	(Australia) Mark Woodforde (Australia) Todd Woodbridge	(Sweden) Jan Apell (Sweden) Jonas Björkman	6–4, 4–6, 6–3
Paris Singles – Doubles	(United States) Andre Agassi	(Switzerland) Marc Rosset	6–3, 6–3, 4–6, 7–5	(Netherlands) Jacco Eltingh (Netherlands) Paul Haarhuis	(Zimbabwe) Byron Black (United States) Jonathan Stark	6–4, 6–3

== Tournament details ==
Key

- Q = Qualifier
- WC = Wild card
- LL = Lucky loser
- Alt = Alternate
- ITF = ITF entry
- PR = Protected ranking
- SR = Special ranking
- SE = Special exempt
- JE = Junior exempt
- JR = Junior Accelerator Programme entrant
- CO = College Accelerator Programme entrant
- NG = Next Gen Accelerator Program entrant
- w/o = Walkover
- r = Retired
- d = Defaulted

=== Indian Wells ===
Tournament name	Newsweek Champions Cup
Dates	February 28 – March 6
Surface	Hard (outdoors)
Location	Indian Wells, California, United States

==== Singles ====
Quarter-finals
1	(United States) Pete Sampras	6	6
8	(Austria) Thomas Muster	3	2
3	(Sweden) Stefan Edberg	6	6
(Australia) Darren Cahill	4	3
12	(Russia) Alexander Volkov	3	4
(United States) Aaron Krickstein	6	6
10	(Czech Republic) Petr Korda	6	3	6
16	(Spain) Carlos Costa	3	6	3

Semi-finals
1	(United States) Pete Sampras	6	3	6
3	(Sweden) Stefan Edberg	3	6	4
(United States) Aaron Krickstein	4	4
10	(Czech Republic) Petr Korda	6	6

Final
1	(United States) Pete Sampras	4	6	3	6	6
10	(Czech Republic) Petr Korda	6	3	6	3	2

==== Doubles ====
Semifinals
1	(Zimbabwe) Byron Black (United States) Jonathan Stark	6	5	6
Q	(South Africa) John-Laffnie de Jager (Zimbabwe) Kevin Ullyett	2	7	4
WC	(Australia) Darren Cahill (Australia) John Fitzgerald	6	6
2	(Canada) Grant Connell (United States) Patrick Galbraith	7	7

Final
1	(Zimbabwe) Byron Black (United States) Jonathan Stark	5	3
2	(Canada) Grant Connell (United States) Patrick Galbraith	7	6

=== Key Biscayne ===
Tournament name	Lipton Championships
Dates	March 7 – 20
Surface	Hard (outdoors)
Location	Key Biscayne, Florida, United States

==== Singles ====
Quarterfinals
1	(United States) Pete Sampras	6	3	6
9	(Czech Republic) Petr Korda	2	6	1
4	(United States) Jim Courier	6	7
5	(Croatia) Goran Ivanišević	3	5
(Australia) Pat Rafter	1	6	6
(United States) Jim Grabb	6	4	1
24	(United States) Andre Agassi	7^{9}	6
WC/2	(Sweden) Stefan Edberg	6^{7}	2

Semifinals
1	(United States) Pete Sampras	6	7^{12}
4	(United States) Jim Courier	4	6^{10}
(Australia) Pat Rafter	2	4
24	(United States) Andre Agassi	6	6

Final
1	(United States) Pete Sampras	5	6	6
24	(United States) Andre Agassi	7	3	3

==== Doubles ====
Semifinals
15	(Netherlands) Jan Siemerink (Czech Republic) Daniel Vacek	2	6	5
3	(Netherlands) Jacco Eltingh (Netherlands) Paul Haarhuis	6	3	7
12	(The Bahamas) Mark Knowles (United States) Jared Palmer	7	3	7
2	(Zimbabwe) Byron Black (United States) Jonathan Stark	5	6	5

Final
3	(Netherlands) Jacco Eltingh (Netherlands) Paul Haarhuis	7^{7}	7^{7}
12	(The Bahamas) Mark Knowles (United States) Jared Palmer	6^{5}	6^{4}

=== Monte Carlo ===
Tournament name	Monte Carlo Open
Dates	April 18 – 24
Surface	Clay (outdoors)
Location	Roquebrune-Cap-Martin, France

==== Singles ====
Quarterfinals
(Russia) Yevgeny Kafelnikov	7^{7}	6
(Czech Republic) David Rikl	6^{1}	3
3	(United States) Jim Courier	7^{7}	5	6^{3}
6	(Ukraine) Andriy Medvedev	6^{5}	7	7^{7}
5	(Spain) Sergi Bruguera	6	6
4	(Croatia) Goran Ivanišević	0	3
9	(Austria) Thomas Muster	7^{10}	6^{2}	4
2	(Sweden) Stefan Edberg	6^{8}	7^{7}	6

Semifinals
(Russia) Yevgeny Kafelnikov	6^{6}	3
6	(Ukraine) Andriy Medvedev	7^{8}	6
5	(Spain) Sergi Bruguera	6	7^{7}
2	(Sweden) Stefan Edberg	2	6^{3}

Final
6	(Ukraine) Andriy Medvedev	7	6	6
5	(Spain) Sergi Bruguera	5	1	3

==== Doubles ====
Semifinals
8	(Spain) Sergio Casal (Spain) Emilio Sánchez	6	3
(Russia) Yevgeny Kafelnikov (Czech Republic) Daniel Vacek	7	6
(South Africa) John-Laffnie de Jager (South Africa) Marcos Ondruska	0	2
(Sweden) Nicklas Kulti (Sweden) Magnus Larsson	6	6

Final
(Russia) Yevgeny Kafelnikov (Czech Republic) Daniel Vacek	6	6^{1}	4
12	(Sweden) Nicklas Kulti (Sweden) Magnus Larsson	3	7^{7}	6

=== Hamburg ===
Tournament name	Panasonic German Open
Dates	May 2 – 8
Surface	Clay (outdoors)
Location	Hamburg, Germany

==== Singles ====
Quarterfinals
1	(Germany) Michael Stich	6	6^{3}	6
9	(Spain) Carlos Costa	4	7^{7}	4
(Russia) Yevgeny Kafelnikov	6	6
11	(Netherlands) Richard Krajicek	3	2
5	(Sweden) Magnus Gustafsson	4	6	1
4	(Ukraine) Andriy Medvedev	6	4	6
(Spain) Javier Sánchez	6	6
(Netherlands) Jacco Eltingh	4	2

Semifinals
1	(Germany) Michael Stich	3	4
(Russia) Yevgeny Kafelnikov	6	6
4	(Ukraine) Andriy Medvedev	6	6
(Spain) Javier Sánchez	4	1

Final
(Russia) Yevgeny Kafelnikov	4	4	6	3
4	(Ukraine) Andriy Medvedev	6	6	3	6

==== Doubles ====
Semifinals
(Germany) Marc-Kevin Goellner (Italy) Diego Nargiso	6	2	3
(United States) Scott Melville (South Africa) Piet Norval	2	6	6
5	(Sweden) Henrik Holm (Sweden) Anders Järryd	6	7
2	(Netherlands) Jacco Eltingh (Netherlands) Paul Haarhuis	4	6

Final
(United States) Scott Melville (South Africa) Piet Norval	6	6
5	(Sweden) Henrik Holm (Sweden) Anders Järryd	3	4

=== Rome ===
Tournament name	Italian Open
Dates	May 9 – 15
Surface	Clay (outdoors)
Location	Rome, Italy

==== Singles ====
Quarter-finals
1	(United States) Pete Sampras	6	7
(Italy) Andrea Gaudenzi	3	5
3	(United States) Jim Courier	6	3	4
(Czech Republic) Sláva Doseděl	1	6	6
(Netherlands) Jacco Eltingh	6^{5}	3
4	(Croatia) Goran Ivanišević	7^{7}	6
8	(Germany) Boris Becker	w/o
WC/2	(Germany) Michael Stich

Semi-finals
1	(United States) Pete Sampras	6	6
(Czech Republic) Sláva Doseděl	1	2
4	(Croatia) Goran Ivanišević	2	6^{5}
8	(Germany) Boris Becker	6	7^{7}

Final
1	(United States) Pete Sampras	6	6	6
8	(Germany) Boris Becker	1	2	2

==== Doubles ====
Semifinals
(South Africa) John-Laffnie de Jager (South Africa) Byron Talbot	3	7	4
(South Africa) Wayne Ferreira (Spain) Javier Sánchez	6	6	6
(Russia) Yevgeny Kafelnikov (Czech Republic) David Rikl	6	6
(Germany) Marc-Kevin Goellner (Italy) Diego Nargiso	4	3

Final
(South Africa) Wayne Ferreira (Spain) Javier Sánchez	1	5
(Russia) Yevgeny Kafelnikov (Czech Republic) David Rikl	6	7

=== Toronto ===
Tournament name	Canadian Open
Dates	July 25 – 31
Surface	Hard (outdoors)
Location	Toronto, Ontario, Canada

==== Singles ====
Quarterfinals
1	(Spain) Sergi Bruguera	6	6^{2}	1
8	(United States) Andre Agassi	4	7^{7}	6
14	(United States) MaliVai Washington	6	5	5
6	(South Africa) Wayne Ferreira	4	7	7
(Sweden) Thomas Enqvist	2	2
4	(United States) Jim Courier	6	6
(Australia) Jason Stoltenberg	6	6
15	(United States) Richey Reneberg	4	2

Semifinals
8	(United States) Andre Agassi	6	7
6	(South Africa) Wayne Ferreira	4	5
4	(United States) Jim Courier	6	0	1
(Australia) Jason Stoltenberg	3	6	6

Final
8	(United States) Andre Agassi	6	6
(Australia) Jason Stoltenberg	4	4

==== Doubles ====
Semifinals
1	(Zimbabwe) Byron Black (United States) Jonathan Stark	5	7	6
(United States) Jim Courier (The Bahamas) Mark Knowles	7	5	2
3	(United States) Patrick McEnroe (United States) Jared Palmer	6	6
(Canada) Daniel Nestor (United States) Alex O'Brien	3	2

Final
1	(Zimbabwe) Byron Black (United States) Jonathan Stark	6	6
3	(United States) Patrick McEnroe (United States) Jared Palmer	4	4

=== Cincinnati ===
Tournament name	Thriftway ATP Championships
Dates	August 8 – 14
Surface	Hard (outdoors)
Location	Mason, Ohio, United States

==== Singles ====
Quarter-finals
Q	(United States) David Wheaton	7^{7}	2	6
7	(United States) Jim Courier	6^{3}	6	3
4	(United States) Michael Chang	6	3	7
(Australia) Jason Stoltenberg	1	6	5
LL	(United States) Alex O'Brien	2	4
3	(Germany) Michael Stich	6	6
(Israel) Amos Mansdorf	7	4	0^{r}
2	(Sweden) Stefan Edberg	5	6	0

Semi-finals
Q	(United States) David Wheaton	3	4
4	(United States) Michael Chang	6	6
3	(Germany) Michael Stich	2	6^{6}
2	(Sweden) Stefan Edberg	6	7^{8}

Final
4	(United States) Michael Chang	6	7
2	(Sweden) Stefan Edberg	2	5

==== Doubles ====
Semifinals
(United States) Alex O'Brien (Australia) Sandon Stolle	3	6	7
3	(Australia) Todd Woodbridge (Australia) Mark Woodforde	7	3	6
4	(United States) Patrick McEnroe (United States) Jared Palmer	6	7	3
(South Africa) Wayne Ferreira (Australia) Mark Kratzmann	7	6	6

Final
(United States) Alex O'Brien (Australia) Sandon Stolle	6^{4}	6	6
(South Africa) Wayne Ferreira (Australia) Mark Kratzmann	7^{7}	3	2

=== Stockholm ===
Tournament name	Stockholm Open
Dates	October 24 – 30
Surface	Carpet (indoors)
Location	Stockholm, Sweden

==== Singles ====
Quarter-finals
1	(United States) Pete Sampras	6	6
(Sweden) Magnus Larsson	1	4
3	(Germany) Michael Stich	6^{3}	3
6	(Germany) Boris Becker	7^{7}	6
11	(Russia) Yevgeny Kafelnikov	6^{4}	6	6
4	(Spain) Sergi Bruguera	7^{7}	4	2
9	(United States) Andre Agassi	1	6	6^{8}
2	(Croatia) Goran Ivanišević	6	3	7^{10}

Semi-finals
(United States) Pete Sampras	4	4
6	(Germany) Boris Becker	6	6
11	(Russia) Yevgeny Kafelnikov	5	4
2	(Croatia) Goran Ivanišević	7	6

Final
6	(Germany) Boris Becker	4	6	6	7^{7}
2	(Croatia) Goran Ivanišević	6	4	3	6^{4}

==== Doubles ====
Semifinals
Q	(United States) Mark Keil (Sweden) Peter Nyborg	5	5
3	(Sweden) Jan Apell (Sweden) Jonas Björkman	7	7
4	(United States) Patrick McEnroe (United States) Jared Palmer	4	6	6^{1}
2	(Australia) Todd Woodbridge (Australia) Mark Woodforde	6	4	7^{7}

Final
3	(Sweden) Jan Apell (Sweden) Jonas Björkman	3	4
2	(Australia) Todd Woodbridge (Australia) Mark Woodforde	6	6

=== Paris ===
Tournament name	Paris Open
Dates	October 31 – November 6
Surface	Carpet (indoors)
Location	Paris, France

==== Singles ====
Quarter-finals
1	(United States) Pete Sampras	6^{5}	5
8	(United States) Andre Agassi	7^{7}	7
4	(Spain) Sergi Bruguera	6	7^{7}
(Czech Republic) Petr Korda	3	6^{4}
6	(Germany) Boris Becker	6^{3}	6^{7}
14	(Switzerland) Marc Rosset	7^{7}	7^{9}
7	(United States) Michael Chang	3	6	7^{7}
2	(Croatia) Goran Ivanišević	6	4	6^{4}

Semi-finals
(United States) Andre Agassi	6	6
4	(Spain) Sergi Bruguera	4	4
14	(Switzerland) Marc Rosset	6^{4}	6	6
7	(United States) Michael Chang	7^{7}	3	4

Final
8	(United States) Andre Agassi	6	6	4	7
14	(Switzerland) Marc Rosset	3	3	6	5

==== Doubles ====
Semifinals
1	(Netherlands) Jacco Eltingh (Netherlands) Paul Haarhuis	6	6
4	(Australia) Todd Woodbridge (Australia) Mark Woodforde	3	4
3	(Canada) Grant Connell (United States) Patrick Galbraith	7	3	2
2	(Zimbabwe) Byron Black (United States) Jonathan Stark	6	6	6

Final
1	(Netherlands) Jacco Eltingh (Netherlands) Paul Haarhuis	3	7^{7}	7
2	(Zimbabwe) Byron Black (United States) Jonathan Stark	6	6^{2}	5

== Titles won by player ==
=== Singles ===
#	Player	IN	MI	MO	HA	RO	CA	CI	ST	PA	#	Winning span
	(United States) Jim Courier	2	1	-	-	2	-	-	-	-	5	1991–1993 (3)
	(United States) Pete Sampras	1	2	-	-	1	-	1	-	-	5	1992–1994 (3)
	(United States) Michael Chang	1	1	-	-	-	1	2	-	-	5	1990–1994 (5)
	(United States) Andre Agassi	-	1	-	-	-	2	-	-	1	4	1990–1994 (5)
	(Germany) Boris Becker	-	-	-	-	-	-	-	3	1	4	1990–1994 (5)
	(Sweden) Stefan Edberg	1	-	-	1	-	-	1	-	1	4	1990–1992 (3)
	(Spain) Sergi Bruguera	-	-	2	-	-	-	-	-	-	2	1991–1993 (3)
	(Russia) Andrei Chesnokov	-	-	1	-	-	1	-	-	-	2	1990–1991 (2)
	(France) Guy Forget	-	-	-	-	-	-	1	-	1	2	1991
	(Croatia) Goran Ivanišević	-	-	-	-	-	-	-	1	1	2	1992–1993 (2)
	(Ukraine) Andrei Medvedev	-	-	1	1	-	-	-	-	-	2	1994
	(Austria) Thomas Muster	-	-	1	-	1	-	-	-	-	2	1990–1992 (3)
	(Germany) Michael Stich	-	-	-	1	-	-	-	1	-	2	1993
	(Spain) Juan Aguilera	-	-	-	1	-	-	-	-	-	1	1990
	(Czech Republic) Karel Nováček	-	-	-	1	-	-	-	-	-	1	1991
	(Spain) Emilio Sánchez	-	-	-	-	1	-	-	-	-	1	1991
	(Sweden) Mikael Pernfors	-	-	-	-	-	1	-	-	-	1	1993
#	Player	IN	MI	MO	HA	RO	CA	CI	ST	PA	#	Winning span

== See also ==
- ATP Tour Masters 1000
- 1994 ATP Tour
- 1994 WTA Tier I Series
- 1994 WTA Tour
