= 1994 in tennis =

This page covers all the important events in the sport of tennis in 1994. Primarily, it provides the results of notable tournaments throughout the year on both the ATP and WTA Tours, the Davis Cup, and the Fed Cup.

== ITF ==
=== Grand Slam events ===
==== Australian Open ====
The 1994 Australian Open was the first major tournament of the year. It took place at Flinders Park in Melbourne, Australia, from 17 to 30 January.

Category	Champion(s)	Finalist(s)	Score in the final
Men's singles	(United States) Pete Sampras	(United States) Todd Martin	7–6^{(7–4)}, 6–4, 6–4
Women's singles	(Germany) Steffi Graf	(Spain) Arantxa Sánchez Vicario	6–0, 6–2
Men's doubles	(Netherlands) Jacco Eltingh (Netherlands) Paul Haarhuis	(Zimbabwe) Byron Black (United States) Jonathan Stark	6–7^{(3–7)}, 6–3, 6–4, 6–3
Women's doubles	(United States) Gigi Fernández (Belarus) Natasha Zvereva	(United States) Patty Fendick (United States) Meredith McGrath	6–3, 4–6, 6–4
Mixed doubles	(Latvia) Larisa Neiland (Russia) Andrei Olhovskiy	(Czech Republic) Helena Suková (Australia) Todd Woodbridge	7–5, 6–7^{(0–7)}, 6–2

==== French Open ====
The 1994 French Open played on clay courts took place at the clay courts of the Stade Roland Garros in Paris, France from 23 May until 5 June.

Category	Champion(s)	Finalist(s)	Score in the final
Men's singles	(Spain) Sergi Bruguera	(Spain) Alberto Berasategui	6–3, 7–5, 2–6, 6–1
Women's singles	(Spain) Arantxa Sánchez Vicario	(France) Mary Pierce	6–4, 6–4
Men's doubles	(Zimbabwe) Byron Black (United States) Jonathan Stark	(Sweden) Jan Apell (Sweden) Jonas Björkman	6–4, 7–6
Women's doubles	(United States) Gigi Fernández (Belarus) Natalia Zvereva	(United States) Lindsay Davenport (United States) Lisa Raymond	6–2, 6–2
Mixed doubles	(Netherlands) Kristie Boogert (Netherlands) Menno Oosting	(Latvia) Larisa Savchenko-Neiland (Russia) Andrei Olhovskiy	7–5, 3–6, 7–5

==== Wimbledon ====
The 1994 Wimbledon Championships, played on grass courts, took place at the All England Lawn Tennis and Croquet Club in Wimbledon, London, England, and were held from 20 June to 3 July.

Category	Champion(s)	Finalist(s)	Score in the final
Men's singles	(United States) Pete Sampras	(Croatia) Goran Ivanišević	7–6 ^{(7–2)}, 7–6 ^{(7–5)}, 6–0
Women's singles	(Spain) Conchita Martínez	(United States) Martina Navratilova	6–4, 3–6, 6–3
Men's doubles	(Australia) Todd Woodbridge (Australia) Mark Woodforde	(Canada) Grant Connell (United States) Patrick Galbraith	7–6^{(7–3)}, 6–3, 6–1
Women's doubles	(United States) Gigi Fernández (Belarus) Natasha Zvereva	(Czech Republic) Jana Novotná (Spain) Arantxa Sánchez Vicario	6–4, 6–1
Mixed doubles	(Czech Republic) Helena Suková (Australia) Todd Woodbridge	(United States) Lori McNeil (United States) T. J. Middleton	3–6, 7–5, 6–3

==== US Open ====
The 1994 US Open was the last major of the year, played on outdoor hard courts at the USTA National Tennis Center in New York City, United States. It was held from 29 August to 11 September.

Category	Champion(s)	Finalist(s)	Score in the final
Men's singles	(United States) Andre Agassi	(Germany) Michael Stich	6–1, 7–6^{(7–5)}, 7–5
Women's singles	(Spain) Arantxa Sánchez Vicario	(Germany) Steffi Graf	1–6, 7–6^{(7–3)}, 6–4
Men's doubles	(Netherlands) Jacco Eltingh (Netherlands) Paul Haarhuis	(Australia) Todd Woodbridge (Australia) Mark Woodforde	6–3, 7–6^{(7–1)}
Women's doubles	(Czech Republic) Jana Novotná (Spain) Arantxa Sánchez Vicario	(Bulgaria) Katerina Maleeva (United States) Robin White	6–3, 6–3
Mixed doubles	(South Africa) Elna Reinach (United States) Patrick Galbraith	(Czech Republic) Jana Novotná (Australia) Todd Woodbridge	6–2, 6–4

=== Davis Cup ===
The 1994 Davis Cup was the 83rd edition of the year-long tournament between national teams in men's tennis.

==== Draw ====
1994 Davis Cup World Group draw

First round 25-27 March
New Delhi, India (grass)
United States	5
India	0
Eindhoven, Netherlands (indoor carpet)
Netherlands	5
Belgium	0
Lund, Sweden (indoor carpet)
Sweden	5
Denmark	0
Besançon, France (indoor hard)
France	4
Hungary	1
Ramat HaSharon, Israel (hard)
Israel	1
Czech Republic	4
Saint Petersburg, Russia (indoor carpet)
Russia	4
Australia	1
Madrid, Spain (clay)
Italy	1
Spain	4
Graz, Austria (indoor clay)
Austria	2
Germany	3

Quarterfinals; 15-17 July
Rotterdam, Netherlands (hard)
United States	3
Netherlands	2
Cannes, France (hard)
Sweden	3
France	2
Saint Petersburg, Russia (indoor carpet)
Czech Republic	2
Russia	3
Halle, Germany (grass)
Spain	2
Germany	3

Semifinals; 23-25 September
Gothenburg, Sweden (indoor carpet)
United States	2
Sweden	3
Hamburg, Germany (hard)
Russia	4
Germany	1

Final; 2-4 December
Moscow, Russia (indoor carpet)
Sweden	4
Russia	1

==== Finals ====
Russia
1
Olympic Stadium, Moscow, Russia
2–4 December 1994
Carpet (indoors)

Sweden
4

			1	2	3	4	5
1	(Russia) (Sweden)	Alexander Volkov; Stefan Edberg	4; 6	2; 6	7^{7} 6^{2}	6; 0	6; 8
2	(Russia) (Sweden)	Yevgeny Kafelnikov; Magnus Larsson	0; 6	2; 6	6; 3	6; 2	3; 6
3	(Russia) (Sweden)	Yevgeny Kafelnikov / Andrei Olhovskiy; Jan Apell / Jonas Björkman	7^{7} 6^{5}	2; 6	3; 6	6; 1	6; 8
4	(Russia) (Sweden)	Yevgeny Kafelnikov; Stefan Edberg	4; 6	6; 4	6; 0
5	(Russia) (Sweden)	Alexander Volkov; Magnus Larsson	6^{5} 7^{7}	4; 6

=== Federation Cup ===
The 1994 Federation Cup was the 32nd edition of the most relevant competition between national teams in women's tennis.

==== Draw ====
1994 Federation Cup World Group draw

First Round; 18–19 July
Spain	3
Q	Chile	0
Q	Cuba	0
Argentina	3
Q	Belgium	1
Sweden	2
China	1
Japan	2
Finland	1
Q	Slovakia	2
Germany	3
Colombia	0
South Africa	3
Q	Paraguay	0
Q	Belarus	1
Netherlands	2
France	3
South Korea	0
Italy	2
Denmark	1
Q	Chinese Taipei	1
Indonesia	2
Croatia	1
Bulgaria	2
United States	3
Czech Republic	0
Canada	3
Switzerland	0
Q	Austria	2
Poland	1
Latvia	1
Australia	2

Second Round; 20–21 July
Spain	3
Argentina	0
Sweden	0
Japan	3
Q	Slovakia	1
Germany	2
South Africa	2
Netherlands	1
France	3
Italy	0
Indonesia	0
Bulgaria	3
United States	3
Canada	0
Q	Austria	2
Australia	1

Quarterfinals; 22 July
Spain	3
Japan	0
Germany	3
South Africa	0
France	2
Bulgaria	1
United States	3
Q	Austria	0

Semifinals; 23 July
Spain	2
Germany	1
France	0
United States	3

Final; 24 July
Spain	3
United States	0

==== Finals ====
Spain
3
Waldstadion T.C., Frankfurt, Germany
24 July 1994
Clay (outdoors)

United States
0

			1	2	3
1	(Spain) (United States)	Conchita Martínez; Mary Joe Fernández	6; 2	6; 2
2	(Spain) (United States)	Arantxa Sánchez Vicario; Lindsay Davenport	6; 2	6; 1
3	(Spain) (United States)	Conchita Martínez / Arantxa Sánchez Vicario; Gigi Fernández / Mary Joe Fernández	6; 3	6; 4

== ATP Tour ==
=== ATP Tour World Championships ===
The 1994 ATP Tour World Championships was the year-end tournament, where the best eight players of the year competed in a round robin format. The singles championship took place at the Frankfurt Festhalle in Frankfurt, Germany, and the doubles tournament was played in Jakarta, Indonesia.

==== Singles ====
	Championship	Champions	Finalists	Score in the final
Men	Frankfurt	(United States) Pete Sampras	(Germany) Boris Becker	4–6, 6–3, 7–5, 6–4

==== Doubles ====
	Championship	Champions	Finalists	Score in the final
Men	Jakarta	(Sweden) Jan Apell (Sweden) Jonas Björkman	(Australia) Todd Woodbridge (Australia) Mark Woodforde	6–4, 4–6, 4–6, 7–6^{(7–5)}, 7–6^{(8–6)}

=== Championship Series, Single Week events ===
The ATP Championship Series, Single Week events, precursors of the ATP Masters 1000, were the second in relevance after the Grand Slam tournaments.

==== Singles ====
	Championship	Champions	Finalists	Score in the final
Men	Indian Wells	(United States) Pete Sampras	(Czech Republic) Petr Korda	4–6, 6–3, 3–6, 6–3, 6–2
Men	Miami	(United States) Pete Sampras	(United States) Andre Agassi	5–7, 6–3, 6–3
Men	Monte Carlo	(Ukraine) Andriy Medvedev	(Spain) Sergi Bruguera	7–5, 6–1, 6–3
Men	Hamburg	(Ukraine) Andriy Medvedev	(Russia) Yevgeny Kafelnikov	6–4, 6–4, 3–6, 6–3
Men	Rome	(United States) Pete Sampras	(Germany) Boris Becker	6–1, 6–2, 6–2
Men	Toronto	(United States) Andre Agassi	(Australia) Jason Stoltenberg	6–4, 6–4
Men	Cincinnati	(United States) Michael Chang	(Sweden) Stefan Edberg	6–2, 7–5
Men	Stockholm	(Germany) Boris Becker	(Croatia) Goran Ivanišević	4–6, 6–4, 6–3, 7–6^{(7–4)}
Men	Paris	(United States) Andre Agassi	(Switzerland) Marc Rosset	6–3, 6–3, 4–6, 7–5

==== Doubles ====
	Championship	Champions	Finalists	Score in the final
Men	Indian Wells	(Canada) Grant Connell (United States) Patrick Galbraith	(Zimbabwe) Byron Black (United States) Jonathan Stark	7–5, 6–3
Men	Miami	(Netherlands) Jacco Eltingh (Netherlands) Paul Haarhuis	(The Bahamas) Mark Knowles (United States) Jared Palmer	7–6, 7–6
Men	Monte Carlo	(Sweden) Nicklas Kulti (Sweden) Magnus Larsson	(Russia) Yevgeny Kafelnikov (Czech Republic) Daniel Vacek	3–6, 7–6, 6–4
Men	Hamburg	(United States) Scott Melville (South Africa) Piet Norval	(Sweden) Henrik Holm (Sweden) Anders Järryd	7–6, 6–3
Men	Rome	(Russia) Yevgeny Kafelnikov (Czech Republic) David Rikl	(South Africa) Wayne Ferreira (Spain) Javier Sánchez	6–1, 7–5
Men	Toronto	(Zimbabwe) Byron Black (United States) Jonathan Stark	(United States) Patrick McEnroe (United States) Jared Palmer	6–4, 6–4
Men	Cincinnati	(United States) Alex O'Brien (Australia) Sandon Stolle	(South Africa) Wayne Ferreira (Australia) Mark Kratzmann	6–7, 6–3, 6–2
Men	Stockholm	(Australia) Todd Woodbridge (Australia) Mark Woodforde	(Sweden) Jan Apell (Sweden) Jonas Björkman	6–3, 6–4
Men	Paris	(Netherlands) Jacco Eltingh (Netherlands) Paul Haarhuis	(Zimbabwe) Byron Black (United States) Jonathan Stark	3–6, 7–6, 7–5

== WTA Tour ==
=== WTA Tour Championships ===
The 1994 WTA Tour Championships were held in New York, United States between November 14 and November 20. This was the year-end tournament, which was played by the top-eight women players.

==== Singles final ====
- (Argentina) Gabriela Sabatini def. (United States) Lindsay Davenport, 6–3, 6–2, 6–4

==== Doubles final ====
- (United States) Gigi Fernández / (Belarus) Natalia Zvereva def. (Czech Republic) Jana Novotná / (Spain) Arantxa Sánchez Vicario, 6–3, 6–7, 6–3.

=== WTA Tier I Tournaments ===
The WTA Tier I Tournaments were next in importance to Grand Slam events.

Tournament	Singles winner	Singles runner-up	Score	Doubles winners	Doubles runners-up	Score
Tokyo	(Germany) Steffi Graf	(United States) Martina Navratilova	6–2, 6–4	(United States) Pam Shriver (Australia) Elizabeth Smylie	(Netherlands) Manon Bollegraf (United States) Martina Navratilova	6–3, 3–6, 7–6
Miami	(Germany) Steffi Graf	(Belarus) Natasha Zvereva	4–6, 6–1, 6–2	(United States) Gigi Fernández (Belarus) Natalia Zvereva	(United States) Patty Fendick (United States) Meredith McGrath	6–3, 6–1
Hilton Head	(Spain) Conchita Martínez	(Belarus) Natasha Zvereva	6–4, 6–0	(United States) Lori McNeil (Spain) Arantxa Sánchez Vicario	(United States) Gigi Fernández (Belarus) Natalia Zvereva	6–4, 4–1, ret.
Rome	(Spain) Conchita Martínez	(United States) Martina Navratilova	7–6^{(7–5)}, 6–4	(United States) Gigi Fernández (Belarus) Natalia Zvereva	(Argentina) Gabriela Sabatini (Netherlands) Brenda Schultz	6–1, 6–3
Berlin	(Germany) Steffi Graf	(Netherlands) Brenda Schultz	7–6^{(8–6)}, 6–4	(United States) Gigi Fernández (Belarus) Natalia Zvereva	(Czech Republic) Jana Novotná (Spain) Arantxa Sánchez Vicario	6–3, 7–6
Montreal	(Spain) Arantxa Sánchez Vicario	(Germany) Steffi Graf	7–5, 1–6, 7–6^{(7–4)}	(United States) Meredith McGrath (Spain) Arantxa Sánchez Vicario	(United States) Pam Shriver (Australia) Elizabeth Smylie	7–5, 1–6, 7–6
Zurich	(Bulgaria) Magdalena Maleeva	(Belarus) Natasha Zvereva	7–5, 3–6, 6–4	(Netherlands) Manon Bollegraf (United States) Martina Navratilova	(United States) Patty Fendick (United States) Meredith McGrath	7–6, 6–1
Philadelphia	(Germany) Anke Huber	(France) Mary Pierce	6–0, 6–7^{(4–7)}, 7–5	(United States) Gigi Fernández (Belarus) Natalia Zvereva	(Argentina) Gabriela Sabatini (Netherlands) Brenda Schultz	4–6, 6–4, 6–2

== Year-end singles rankings ==
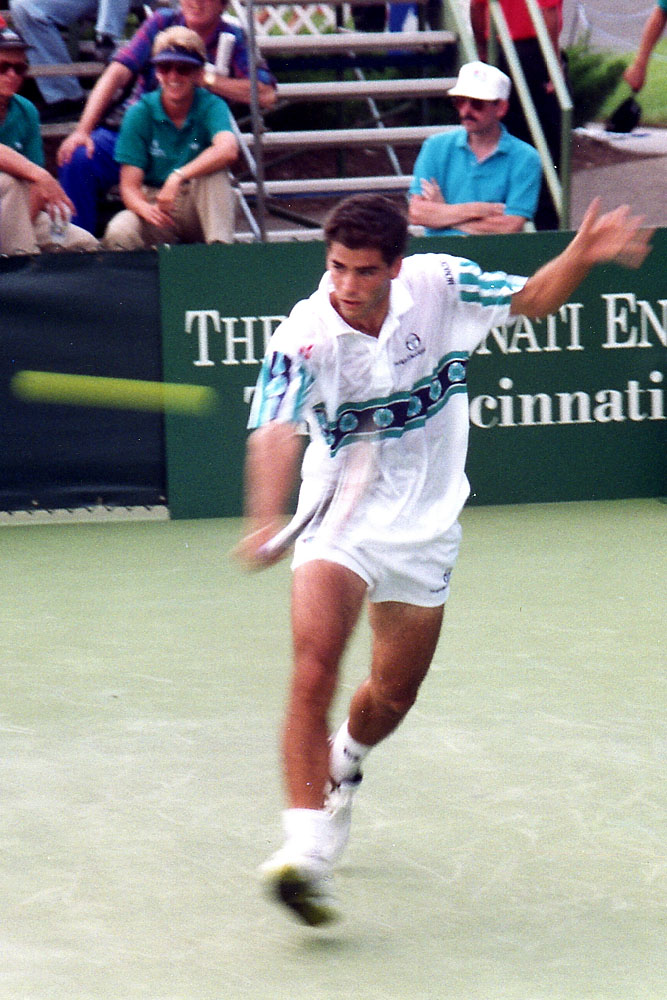
Sampras ended the season as World No.1 for the second consecutive time.

Top 10 ATP Year-end rankings
N°	Name	Nation
1	Pete Sampras	USA
2	Andre Agassi	USA
3	Boris Becker	GER
4	Sergi Bruguera	ESP
5	Goran Ivanišević	CRO
6	Michael Chang	USA
7	Stefan Edberg	SWE
8	Alberto Berasategui	ESP
9	Michael Stich	GER
10	Todd Martin	USA

Top 10 WTA Year-end rankings
N°	Name	Nation
1	Steffi Graf	GER
2	Arantxa Sánchez Vicario	ESP
3	Conchita Martínez	ESP
4	Jana Novotná	CZE
5	Mary Pierce	FRA
6	Lindsay Davenport	USA
7	Gabriela Sabatini	ARG
8	Martina Navratilova	USA
9	Kimiko Date-Krumm	JPN
10	Natasha Zvereva	BLR

== International Tennis Hall of Fame ==
- Class of 1994:
  - Hana Mandlíková, player
  - Bud Collins, contributor

== See also ==
- 1994 ATP Tour
- 1994 WTA Tour
