= 1994 Canadian Open – Doubles =

1994 Canadian Open – Doubles may refer to:

- 1994 Canadian Open – Men's doubles, the doubles draw for the men's tennis tournament
- 1994 Canadian Open – Women's doubles, the doubles draw for the women's tennis tournament

== See also ==
- 1994 Canadian Open
