= 1994 Canadian Open – Singles =

1994 Canadian Open – Singles may refer to:

- 1994 Canadian Open – Men's singles, the singles draw for the men's tennis tournament
- 1994 Canadian Open – Women's singles, the singles draw for the women's tennis tournament

== See also ==
- 1994 Canadian Open
