= 1993 Stockholm Open – Singles =

Singles
- 1993 Stockholm Open

Final
- Champion: (Germany) Michael Stich
- Runner-up: (Croatia) Goran Ivanišević
- Score: 4–6, 7–6^{(8–6)}, 7–6^{(7–3)}, 6–2

Details
- Draw: 48
- Seeds: 16

Events
Singles	Doubles
← 1992 ·	Stockholm Open	· 1994 →

Michael Stich defeated the defending champion Goran Ivanišević in the final, 4–6, 7–6^{(8–6)}, 7–6^{(7–3)}, 6–2 to win the singles tennis title at the 1993 Stockholm Open.

== Seeds ==
1. (United States) Pete Sampras (second round)
2. (United States) Jim Courier (third round)
3. (Germany) Boris Becker (third round)
4. (Germany) Michael Stich (champion)
5. (Spain) Sergi Bruguera (third round)
6. (Sweden) Stefan Edberg (quarterfinals)
7. (Ukraine) Andrei Medvedev (second round)
8. (Croatia) Goran Ivanišević (final)
9. (Czech Republic) Petr Korda (quarterfinals)
10. (United States) Todd Martin (third round)
11. (Czech Republic) ~~Karel Nováček~~ (withdrew)
12. (Russia) Alexander Volkov (second round)
13. (Sweden) Magnus Gustafsson (third round)
14. (South Africa) Wayne Ferreira (second round)
15. (Switzerland) Marc Rosset (semifinals)
16. (France) Arnaud Boetsch (quarterfinals)

== Draw ==
=== Key ===
- Q = Qualifier
- WC = Wild card
- LL = Lucky loser
- Alt = Alternate
- SE = Special exempt
- PR = Protected ranking
- ITF = ITF entry
- JE = Junior exempt
- w/o = Walkover
- r = Retired
- d = Defaulted
- SR = Special ranking

=== Finals ===
Quarterfinals
16	(France) Arnaud Boetsch	1	3
8	(Croatia) Goran Ivanišević	6	6
(United States) MaliVai Washington	4	6	6
(Sweden) Jonas Svensson	6	4	3
6	(Sweden) Stefan Edberg	6	2	4
4	(Germany) Michael Stich	1	6	6
9	(Czech Republic) Petr Korda	4	6^{5}
15	(Switzerland) Marc Rosset	6	7^{7}

Semifinals
8	(Croatia) Goran Ivanišević	6	6
(United States) MaliVai Washington	2	1
4	(Germany) Michael Stich	6	7^{7}
15	(Switzerland) Marc Rosset	4	6^{1}

Final
8	(Croatia) Goran Ivanišević	6	6^{6}	6^{3}	2
4	(Germany) Michael Stich	4	7^{8}	7^{7}	6

=== Top half ===
==== Section 1 ====
First round
(Spain) C Costa	6	6
(Russia) A Chesnokov	3	3
(New Zealand) B Steven	6^{2}	6	7^{7}
(Germany) M-K Goellner	7^{7}	3	6^{5}
(United States) R Reneberg	6	6
Q	(Sweden) D Engel	2	4
WC	(Sweden) C Bergström	6	7^{10}
WC	(Sweden) T Enqvist	3	6^{8}

Second round
1	(United States) P Sampras	6^{1}	6	1
(Spain) C Costa	7^{7}	2	6
(New Zealand) B Steven	5	1
16	(France) A Boetsch	7	6
10	(United States) T Martin	6	6
(United States) R Reneberg	2	4
WC	(Sweden) C Bergström	6	5	2
8	(Croatia) G Ivanišević	4	7	6

Third round
(Spain) C Costa	3	7^{7}	1
16	(France) A Boetsch	6	6^{5}	6
10	(United States) T Martin	2	4
8	(Croatia) G Ivanišević	6	6

Quarterfinals
16	(France) A Boetsch	3	1
8	(Croatia) G Ivanišević	6	6

==== Section 2 ====
First round
WC	(Sweden) N Kulti	3	6^{8}
(United States) A Krickstein	6	7^{10}
(United States) M Washington	6	6
(Israel) A Mansdorf	4	4
(Sweden) J Svensson	6	4	7
(Spain) J Sánchez	3	6	5
(United States) B Gilbert	6^{3}	6	3
(Switzerland) J Hlasek	7^{7}	2	6

Second round
3	(Germany) B Becker	7	6
(United States) A Krickstein	5	4
(United States) M Washington	6	6
14	(South Africa) W Ferreira	1	3
LL	(Spain) E Benfele Álvarez	3	1
(Sweden) J Svensson	6	6
(Switzerland) J Hlasek	6	2	6^{2}
5	(Spain) S Bruguera	1	6	7^{7}

Third round
3	(Germany) B Becker	1	3
(United States) M Washington	6	6
(Sweden) J Svensson	3	6	6
5	(Spain) S Bruguera	6	3	2

Quarterfinals
(United States) M Washington	4	6	6
(Sweden) J Svensson	6	4	3

=== Bottom half ===
==== Section 3 ====
First round
(Sweden) H Holm	7	6
Q	(Sweden) J Apell	5	3
(Russia) A Cherkasov	6	6^{7}	6
(Australia) M Woodforde	4	7^{9}	3
(Sweden) M Larsson	6	3	6
(Australia) J Stoltenberg	4	6	3
(Sweden) M Pernfors	6	6
LL	(United States) K Jones	4	1

Second round
6	(Sweden) S Edberg	7	6
(Sweden) H Holm	5	1
(Russia) A Cherkasov	3	6	7
12	(Russia) A Volkov	6	4	5
13	(Sweden) M Gustafsson	6	7^{7}
(Sweden) M Larsson	4	6^{3}
(Sweden) M Pernfors	7^{7}	5	2
4	(Germany) M Stich	6^{3}	7	6

Third round
6	(Sweden) S Edberg	4	6	6
(Russia) A Cherkasov	6	1	2
13	(Sweden) M Gustafsson	6^{2}	4
4	(Germany) M Stich	7^{7}	6

Quarterfinals
6	(Sweden) S Edberg	6	2	4
4	(Germany) M Stich	1	6	6

==== Section 4 ====
First round
WC	(Sweden) A Järryd	6	7^{11}
Q	(Sweden) T Nydahl	3	6^{9}
Q	(Russia) Y Kafelnikov	6	6
(South Africa) M Ondruska	2	3
Q	(United States) J Palmer	6	6
(Germany) B Karbacher	4	3
(United States) D Wheaton	7^{7}	6^{5}	7
Q	(Canada) D Nestor	6^{4}	7^{7}	5

Second round
7	(Ukraine) A Medvedev	1	6	0
WC	(Sweden) A Järryd	6	4	6
Q	(Russia) Y Kafelnikov	6^{5}	6^{4}
9	(Czech Republic) P Korda	7^{7}	7^{7}
15	(Switzerland) M Rosset	6	6
Q	(United States) J Palmer	4	2
(United States) D Wheaton	5	7	3
2	(United States) J Courier	7	5	6

Third round
WC	(Sweden) A Järryd	6	2	6^{8}
9	(Czech Republic) P Korda	3	6	7^{10}
15	(Switzerland) M Rosset	6^{5}	6	7^{7}
2	(United States) J Courier	7^{7}	3	6^{3}

Quarterfinals
9	(Czech Republic) P Korda	4	6^{5}
15	(Switzerland) M Rosset	6	7^{7}
