= 1993 Stockholm Open – Doubles =

Doubles
- 1993 Stockholm Open

Final
- Champions: (Australia) Todd Woodbridge (Australia) Mark Woodforde
- Runners-up: (South Africa) Gary Muller (South Africa) Danie Visser
- Score: 6–1, 3–6, 6–2

Events
Singles	Doubles
← 1992 ·	Stockholm Open	· 1994 →

Todd Woodbridge and Mark Woodforde were the defending champions.

Woodbridge and Woodforde successfully defended their title, defeating Gary Muller and Danie Visser 6–1, 3–6, 6–2 in the final.

== Seeds ==
All seeds receive a bye into the second round.

1. (Canada) Grant Connell / (United States) Patrick Galbraith (final)
2. (Australia) Todd Woodbridge / (Australia) Mark Woodforde (champions)
3. (Australia) John Fitzgerald / (Sweden) Anders Järryd (second round)
4. (United States) Luke Jensen / (United States) Murphy Jensen (second round)
5. (United States) Ken Flach / (United States) Rick Leach (second round)
6. (South Africa) David Adams / (Russia) Andrei Olhovskiy (second round)
7. (Netherlands) Tom Nijssen / (Czech Republic) Cyril Suk (quarterfinals)
8. (Australia) Mark Kratzmann / (Australia) Laurie Warder (second round)

== Draw ==
=== Key ===
- Q = Qualifier
- WC = Wild card
- LL = Lucky loser
- Alt = Alternate
- SE = Special exempt
- PR = Protected ranking
- ITF = ITF entry
- JE = Junior exempt
- w/o = Walkover
- r = Retired
- d = Defaulted
- SR = Special ranking

=== Finals ===
Semifinals
1	(Canada) Grant Connell (United States) Patrick Galbraith	4	4
(South Africa) Gary Muller (South Africa) Danie Visser	6	6
(United States) Scott Davis (United States) Richey Reneberg	3	6	1
2	(Australia) Todd Woodbridge (Australia) Mark Woodforde	6	4	6

Final
(South Africa) Gary Muller (South Africa) Danie Visser	1	6	2
2	(Australia) Todd Woodbridge (Australia) Mark Woodforde	6	3	6

=== Top half ===
First round
(United States) M Keil (South Africa) C van Rensburg	4	6	1
LL	(Germany) M-K Goellner (Germany) C Saceanu	6	3	6
(United States) B Pearce (United States) D Randall	6	7
(Canada) G Michibata (United States) D Pate	4	6
(South Africa) G Muller (South Africa) D Visser	7	6
(Netherlands) M Oosting (Germany) U Riglewski	6	4
(United States) S Cannon (United States) S Melville	6	6	6
WC	(Sweden) T Enqvist (Sweden) N Kulti	7	3	4

Second round
1	(Canada) G Connell (United States) P Galbraith	4	6	6
LL	(Germany) M-K Goellner (Germany) C Saceanu	6	3	2
(United States) B Pearce (United States) D Randall	2	6
7	(Netherlands) T Nijssen (Czech Republic) C Suk	6	7
3	(Australia) J Fitzgerald (Sweden) A Järryd	6	4
(South Africa) G Muller (South Africa) D Visser	7	6
(United States) S Cannon (United States) S Melville	6	6	7
5	(United States) K Flach (United States) R Leach	4	7	6

Quarterfinals
1	(Canada) G Connell (United States) P Galbraith	7	4	6
7	(Netherlands) T Nijssen (Czech Republic) C Suk	5	6	3
(South Africa) G Muller (South Africa) D Visser	6	7
(United States) S Cannon (United States) S Melville	4	6

Semifinals
1	(Canada) G Connell (United States) P Galbraith	4	4
(South Africa) G Muller (South Africa) D Visser	6	6

=== Bottom half ===
First round
WC	(Germany) B Becker (Sweden) H Holm	3	3
(South Africa) J-L de Jager (South Africa) M Ondruska	6	6
(United States) S Davis (United States) R Reneberg	6	6
(South Africa) W Ferreira (United States) J Palmer	4	3
(Netherlands) HJ Davids (South Africa) P Norval	6	7	6
Q	(Sweden) M Renström (Sweden) M Tillström	7	6	3
WC	(Sweden) M Pernfors (Sweden) J Svensson	7	0	6
(United States) S DeVries (Australia) D Macpherson	6	6	3

Second round
6	(South Africa) D Adams (Russia) A Olhovskiy	4	7	3
(South Africa) J-L de Jager (South Africa) M Ondruska	6	6	6
(United States) S Davis (United States) R Reneberg	7	6
4	(United States) L Jensen (United States) M Jensen	6	4
8	(Australia) M Kratzmann (Australia) L Warder	6	7	6
(Netherlands) HJ Davids (South Africa) P Norval	7	5	7
WC	(Sweden) M Pernfors (Sweden) J Svensson	3	4
2	(Australia) T Woodbridge (Australia) M Woodforde	6	6

Quarterfinals
(South Africa) J-L de Jager (South Africa) M Ondruska	1	2
(United States) S Davis (United States) R Reneberg	6	6
(Netherlands) HJ Davids (South Africa) P Norval	2	6
2	(Australia) T Woodbridge (Australia) M Woodforde	6	7

Semifinals
(United States) S Davis (United States) R Reneberg	3	6	1
2	(Australia) T Woodbridge (Australia) M Woodforde	6	4	6
