= 1993 Stockholm Open =

- Date: 25 October – 1 November
- Edition: 25th
- Category: ATP Super 9
- Draw: 48S / 24D
- Prize money: $1,400,000
- Surface: Carpet (i)
- Location: Stockholm, Sweden
- Venue: Stockholm Globe Arena

Champions

Singles
- (Germany) Michael Stich

Doubles
- (Australia) Todd Woodbridge / (Australia) Mark Woodforde
- Stockholm Open

The 1993 Stockholm Open was a men's tennis tournament played on indoor carpet courts. It was the 25th edition of the Stockholm Open and was part of the ATP Super 9 of the 1993 ATP Tour. It took place at the Stockholm Globe Arena in Stockholm, Sweden, from 25 October through 1 November 1993.

The singles draw was headlined by Pete Sampras. Fourth-seeded Michael Stich won the singles title.

== Finals ==
=== Singles ===
(Germany) Michael Stich defeated (Croatia) Goran Ivanišević, 4–6, 7–6, 7–6, 6–2

- It was Stich's 5th title of the year, and his 12th overall. It was his 2nd Masters title of the year, and overall.

=== Doubles ===
(Australia) Todd Woodbridge / (Australia) Mark Woodforde defeated (South Africa) Gary Muller / (South Africa) Danie Visser, 6–1, 3–6, 6–2
