= 1992 Stockholm Open – Singles =

Singles
- 1992 Stockholm Open

Final
- Champion: (Croatia) Goran Ivanišević
- Runner-up: (France) Guy Forget
- Score: 7–6^{(7–2)}, 4–6, 7–6^{(7–5)}, 6–2

Details
- Draw: 48 (4WC/6Q)
- Seeds: 16

Events
Singles	Doubles
- Stockholm Open

Goran Ivanišević defeated Guy Forget in the final, 7–6^{(7–2)}, 4–6, 7–6^{(7–5)}, 6–2 to win the singles tennis title at the 1992 Stockholm Open.

Boris Becker was the two-time defending champion, but lost in the quarter-finals to Ivanišević.

== Seeds ==
1. (United States) Jim Courier (third round)
2. (Sweden) Stefan Edberg (semifinals)
3. (United States) Pete Sampras (semifinals)
4. (Croatia) Goran Ivanišević (champion)
5. (Czechoslovakia) Petr Korda (quarterfinals)
6. (Germany) Boris Becker (quarterfinals)
7. (South Africa) Wayne Ferreira (second round)
8. (France) Guy Forget (final)
9. (Spain) Carlos Costa (second round)
10. (United States) MaliVai Washington (second round)
11. (Commonwealth of Independent States) Alexander Volkov (second round)
12. (Germany) Michael Stich (third round)
13. (Austria) Thomas Muster (third round)
14. (Spain) Francisco Clavet (second round)
15. (Czechoslovakia) Karel Nováček (third round)
16. (Sweden) Henrik Holm (quarterfinals)

== Draw ==
Key

- Q = Qualifier
- WC = Wild card
- LL = Lucky loser
- Alt = Alternate
- ITF = ITF entry
- PR = Protected ranking
- SR = Special ranking
- SE = Special exempt
- JE = Junior exempt
- JR = Junior Accelerator Programme entrant
- CO = College Accelerator Programme entrant
- NG = Next Gen Accelerator Program entrant
- w/o = Walkover
- r = Retired
- d = Defaulted

=== Finals ===
Quarterfinals
16	(Sweden) Henrik Holm	5	7^{8}	6^{2}
8	(France) Guy Forget	7	6^{6}	7^{7}
3	(United States) Pete Sampras	7^{7}	5	6
5	(Czechoslovakia) Petr Korda	6^{4}	7	3
6	(Germany) Boris Becker	5	4
4	(Croatia) Goran Ivanišević	7	6
(France) Arnaud Boetsch	5	6^{5}
2	(Sweden) Stefan Edberg	7	7^{7}

Semifinals
8	(France) Guy Forget	7^{13}	7^{7}
3	(United States) Pete Sampras	6^{11}	6^{4}
4	(Croatia) Goran Ivanišević	6	7^{10}
2	(Sweden) Stefan Edberg	4	6^{8}

Final
8	(France) Guy Forget	6^{2}	6	6^{5}	2
4	(Croatia) Goran Ivanišević	7^{7}	4	7^{7}	6

=== Top half ===
==== Section 1 ====
First round
(United States) D Rostagno	6	6
Q	(Sweden) M Norman	1	2
(Switzerland) J Hlasek	6	6
Q	(Sweden) J Carlsson	2	4
(Italy) O Camporese	6^{6}	6	6^{4}
WC	(Sweden) T Enqvist	7^{8}	2	7^{7}
(Sweden) M Larsson	3	6	6
(Netherlands) J Siemerink	6	4	1

Second round
1	(United States) J Courier	6	7^{7}
(United States) D Rostagno	1	6^{2}
(Switzerland) J Hlasek	2	0^{r}
16	(Sweden) H Holm	6	1
10	(United States) M Washington	2	1
WC	(Sweden) T Enqvist	6	6
(Sweden) M Larsson	6^{8}	4
8	(France) G Forget	7^{10}	6

Third round
1	(United States) J Courier	4	3
16	(Sweden) H Holm	6	6
WC	(Sweden) T Enqvist	6^{4}	3
8	(France) G Forget	7^{7}	6

Quarterfinals
16	(Sweden) H Holm	5	7^{8}	6^{2}
8	(France) G Forget	7	6^{6}	7^{7}

==== Section 2 ====
First round
(Australia) T Woodbridge	7	6
Q	(Sweden) T Högstedt	5	2
Q	(Sweden) L-A Wahlgren	7^{7}	3	6
WC	(Sweden) N Kulti	6^{5}	6	3
(Italy) S Pescosolido	6	3	1
(United States) J Tarango	2	6	6
(Australia) W Masur	6	6
(Commonwealth of Independent States) A Cherkasov	4	4

Second round
3	(United States) P Sampras	6	7^{8}
(Australia) T Woodbridge	2	6^{6}
Q	(Sweden) L-A Wahlgren	4	6	4
13	(Austria) T Muster	6	4	6
12	(Germany) M Stich	6	7^{7}
(United States) J Tarango	3	6^{5}
(Australia) W Masur	3	1
5	(Czechoslovakia) P Korda	6	6

Third round
3	(United States) P Sampras	6	6
13	(Austria) T Muster	2	4
12	(Germany) M Stich	3	4
5	(Czechoslovakia) P Korda	6	6

Quarterfinals
3	(United States) P Sampras	7^{7}	5	6
5	(Czechoslovakia) P Korda	6^{4}	7	3

=== Bottom half ===
==== Section 3 ====
First round
(United States) B Gilbert	4	3
WC	(Sweden) J Svensson	6	6
Q	(Sweden) J Björkman	2	1
(Israel) A Mansdorf	6	6
WC	(Sweden) M Gustafsson	6	3	6
(Germany) C-U Steeb	3	6	1
(Australia) M Woodforde	7^{11}	6^{5}	4
(United States) D Wheaton	6^{9}	7^{7}	6

Second round
6	(Germany) B Becker	7	7
WC	(Sweden) J Svensson	5	5
(Israel) A Mansdorf	7^{7}	6
11	(Commonwealth of Independent States) A Volkov	6^{5}	1
14	(Spain) F Clavet	2	2
WC	(Sweden) M Gustafsson	6	6
(United States) D Wheaton	4	4
4	(Croatia) G Ivanišević	6	6

Third round
6	(Germany) B Becker	7^{9}	7
(Israel) A Mansdorf	6^{7}	5
WC	(Sweden) M Gustafsson	6^{2}	3
4	(Croatia) G Ivanišević	7^{7}	6

Quarterfinals
6	(Germany) B Becker	5	4
4	(Croatia) G Ivanišević	7	6

==== Section 4 ====
First round
(Spain) J Sánchez	2	6	3
(France) A Boetsch	6	4	6
(Netherlands) P Haarhuis	2	1
(Sweden) C Bergström	6	6
Q	(Sweden) U Stenlund	5	5
(Commonwealth of Independent States) A Chesnokov	7	7
(Commonwealth of Independent States) A Medvedev	6	6
(France) O Delaître	3	2

Second round
7	(South Africa) W Ferreira	1	3
(France) A Boetsch	6	6
(Sweden) C Bergström	3	6	6
9	(Spain) C Costa	6	4	3
15	(Czechoslovakia) K Nováček	6	3	6
(Commonwealth of Independent States) A Chesnokov	1	6	4
(Commonwealth of Independent States) A Medvedev	1	6^{1}
2	(Sweden) S Edberg	6	7^{7}

Third round
(France) A Boetsch	5	6	6
(Sweden) C Bergström	7	3	4
15	(Czechoslovakia) K Nováček	3	4
2	(Sweden) S Edberg	6	6

Quarterfinals
(France) A Boetsch	5	6^{5}
2	(Sweden) S Edberg	7	7^{7}

== Qualifying ==
=== Qualifying seeds ===
1. (Sweden) Lars Jönsson (second round)
2. (Sweden) Mikael Tillström (second round)
3. (Germany) Christian Saceanu (second round)
4. (Sweden) Thomas Högstedt (qualified)
5. (Sweden) Jan Apell (qualifying competition)
6. (Sweden) David Engel (qualifying competition)
7. (Sweden) Lars-Anders Wahlgren (qualified)
8. (Canada) Grant Connell (first round)
9. (Germany) Jörn Renzenbrink (first round)
10. (Sweden) Peter Lundgren (qualifying competition)
11. (Sweden) Niclas Kroon (first round)
12. (Sweden) Tomas Nydahl (second round)

=== Qualifiers ===
1. (Sweden) Ulf Stenlund
2. (Sweden) Jonas Björkman
3. (Sweden) Magnus Norman
4. (Sweden) Thomas Högstedt
5. (Sweden) Lars-Anders Wahlgren
6. (Sweden) Johan Carlsson

=== Qualifying draw ===
==== First qualifier ====
First round
1	(Sweden) Lars Jönsson	4	7	6
(Sweden) Jörgen Nilsson	6	5	4
(South Africa) Piet Norval	6	6
WC	(Sweden) Rickard Dellenborg	3	4
(United States) Luke Jensen	2	4
(Sweden) Ulf Stenlund	6	6
(Czechoslovakia) Libor Pimek	6	3	6
12	(Sweden) Tomas Nydahl	3	6	7

Second round
1	(Sweden) Lars Jönsson	7	2	2
(South Africa) Piet Norval	6	6	6
(Sweden) Ulf Stenlund	7	7
12	(Sweden) Tomas Nydahl	6	5

Qualifying competition
(South Africa) Piet Norval	5	4
(Sweden) Ulf Stenlund	7	6

==== Second qualifier ====
First round
2	(Sweden) Mikael Tillström	6	6
(Denmark) Patrik Langvardt	1	4
(Czechoslovakia) Pavel Vízner	3	3
(Sweden) Jonas Björkman	6	6
(Sweden) Mikael Stadling	6	6
(Netherlands) Sander Groen	3	0
(Netherlands) Hendrik Jan Davids	6	6
11	(Sweden) Niclas Kroon	2	4

Second round
2	(Sweden) Mikael Tillström	4	3
(Sweden) Jonas Björkman	6	6
(Sweden) Mikael Stadling	3	1
(Netherlands) Hendrik Jan Davids	6	6

Qualifying competition
(Sweden) Jonas Björkman	5	6	7
(Netherlands) Hendrik Jan Davids	7	4	5

==== Third qualifier ====
First round
3	(Germany) Christian Saceanu	6	6
(Hungary) Sándor Noszály	4	1
(United States) Dave Randall	2	6	3
WC	(Sweden) Magnus Norman	6	1	6
(Denmark) Frederik Fetterlein	3	2
(Sweden) Conny Falk	6	6
(United States) David Pate	4	6	2
10	(Sweden) Peter Lundgren	6	4	6

Second round
3	(Germany) Christian Saceanu	4	6
WC	(Sweden) Magnus Norman	6	7
(Sweden) Conny Falk	5	0
10	(Sweden) Peter Lundgren	7	6

Qualifying competition
WC	(Sweden) Magnus Norman	6	6
10	(Sweden) Peter Lundgren	3	2

==== Fourth qualifier ====
First round
4	(Sweden) Thomas Högstedt	6	6	6
(Commonwealth of Independent States) Yevgeny Kafelnikov	2	7	2
(Sweden) Johan Alvén	6	6	2
(Finland) Veli Paloheimo	7	3	6
(North Macedonia) Aleksandar Kitinov	2	7	7
(Sweden) Patrik Albertsson	6	6	5
(Sweden) Rikard Bergh	7	6
9	(Germany) Jörn Renzenbrink	5	4

Second round
4	(Sweden) Thomas Högstedt	0	7	6
(Finland) Veli Paloheimo	6	5	4
(North Macedonia) Aleksandar Kitinov	4	0
(Sweden) Rikard Bergh	6	6

Qualifying competition
4	(Sweden) Thomas Högstedt	7	6
(Sweden) Rikard Bergh	5	4

==== Fifth qualifier ====
First round
5	(Sweden) Jan Apell	4	7	6
(Sweden) Ola Kristiansson	6	6	0
WC	(Sweden) Per Henricsson	6	6
(Sweden) Jörgen Windahl	4	4
(Sweden) Jan Gunnarsson	7	6
WC	(Sweden) Nils Holm	6	4
(Sweden) Krister Wedenby	2	3
7	(Sweden) Lars-Anders Wahlgren	6	6

Second round
5	(Sweden) Jan Apell	6	6
WC	(Sweden) Per Henricsson	3	4
(Sweden) Jan Gunnarsson	6	6	1
7	(Sweden) Lars-Anders Wahlgren	7	4	6

Qualifying competition
5	(Sweden) Jan Apell	6	6	5
7	(Sweden) Lars-Anders Wahlgren	7	2	7

==== Sixth qualifier ====
First round
6	(Sweden) David Engel	6	6
(Sweden) Douglas Geiwald	2	3
(United States) Steve DeVries	3	6	6
(Spain) Juan Carlos Báguena	6	4	2
WC	(Sweden) Ola Jonsson	2	0
(Sweden) Johan Carlsson	6	6
(Sweden) Johan Donar	0	6	6
8	(Canada) Grant Connell	6	4	4

Second round
6	(Sweden) David Engel	6	6
(United States) Steve DeVries	4	1
(Sweden) Johan Carlsson	7	6
(Sweden) Johan Donar	6	4

Qualifying competition
6	(Sweden) David Engel	6	6	1
(Sweden) Johan Carlsson	3	7	6
