= 1994 Thriftway ATP Championships – Singles =

Singles
- 1994 Thriftway ATP Championships

Final
- Champion: (United States) Michael Chang
- Runner-up: (Sweden) Stefan Edberg
- Score: 6–2, 7–5

Details
- Draw: 56
- Seeds: 16

Events
Singles	Doubles
← 1993 ·	Thriftway ATP Championships	· 1995 →

Defending champion Michael Chang defeated Stefan Edberg in a rematch of the previous year's final, 6–2, 7–5 to win the singles tennis title at the 1994 Cincinnati Masters.

== Seeds ==
1. (Spain) Sergi Bruguera (third round)
2. (Sweden) Stefan Edberg (final)
3. (Germany) Michael Stich (semifinals)
4. (United States) Michael Chang (champion)
5. (Ukraine) Andrei Medvedev (second round)
6. (United States) ~~Todd Martin~~ (withdrew)
7. (United States) Jim Courier (quarterfinals)
8. (Germany) Boris Becker (third round)
9. (Austria) Thomas Muster (first round)
10. (Czech Republic) Petr Korda (second round)
11. (Russia) Yevgeny Kafelnikov (second round)
12. (South Africa) Wayne Ferreira (third round)
13. (France) Cédric Pioline (third round)
14. (Australia) Patrick Rafter (first round)
15. (Italy) Andrea Gaudenzi (first round)
16. (Peru) Jaime Yzaga (first round)

== Draw ==
=== Key ===
- Q = Qualifier
- WC = Wild card
- LL = Lucky loser
- Alt = Alternate
- SE = Special exempt
- PR = Protected ranking
- ITF = ITF entry
- JE = Junior exempt
- w/o = Walkover
- r = Retired
- d = Defaulted
- SR = Special ranking

=== Finals ===
Semifinals
Q	(United States) David Wheaton	3	4
4	(United States) Michael Chang	6	6
3	(Germany) Michael Stich	2	6^{6}
2	(Sweden) Stefan Edberg	6	7^{8}

Final
4	(United States) Michael Chang	6	7
2	(Sweden) Stefan Edberg	2	5

=== Top half ===
==== Section 1 ====
First round
(Russia) A Cherkasov	7^{7}	6
Q	(France) L Roux	6^{3}	3
Q	(United States) D Wheaton	7^{7}	6
(United States) J Palmer	6^{2}	3
(United States) I Lendl	6	6
16	(Peru) J Yzaga	1	3
9	(Austria) T Muster	5	3
(Australia) M Woodforde	7	6
(New Zealand) B Steven	4	4
Q	(Australia) S Stolle	6	6
Q	(United States) K Flach	2	7^{7}	6
WC	(Sweden) N Kulti	6	6^{2}	2

Second round
1	(Spain) S Bruguera	6	2	6
(Russia) A Cherkasov	1	6	1
Q	(United States) D Wheaton	7^{7}	2
(United States) I Lendl	6^{5}	0	r
(Australia) M Woodforde	2	6	3
Q	(Australia) S Stolle	6	3	6
Q	(United States) K Flach	4	2
7	(United States) J Courier	6	6

Third round
1	(Spain) S Bruguera	2	3
Q	(United States) D Wheaton	6	6
Q	(Australia) S Stolle	3	4
7	(United States) J Courier	6	6

Quarterfinals
Q	(United States) D Wheaton	7^{7}	2	6
7	(United States) J Courier	6^{3}	6	3

==== Section 2 ====
First round
(Czech Republic) D Vacek	4	6	4
(Canada) G Rusedski	6	2	6
(France) J-P Fleurian	0	6^{9}
(United States) J Stark	6	7^{11}
(Australia) W Masur	6	4	2
13	(France) C Pioline	3	6	6
12	(South Africa) W Ferreira	7	6
(Germany) M-K Goellner	5	4
(United States) R Reneberg	7^{7}	5	5
Q	(Australia) T Woodbridge	6^{2}	7	7
(Australia) J Stoltenberg	6	6
(France) O Delaître	3	2

Second round
4	(United States) M Chang	6	6
(Canada) G Rusedski	3	3
(United States) J Stark	4	6	3
13	(France) C Pioline	6	1	6
12	(South Africa) W Ferreira	6	7
Q	(Australia) T Woodbridge	2	5
(Australia) J Stoltenberg	7^{7}	6
5	(Ukraine) A Medvedev	6^{5}	2

Third round
4	(United States) M Chang	6	3	6
13	(France) C Pioline	2	6	3
12	(South Africa) W Ferreira	0	1
(Australia) J Stoltenberg	6	6

Quarterfinals
4	(United States) M Chang	6	3	7
(Australia) J Stoltenberg	1	6	5

=== Bottom half ===
==== Section 3 ====
First round
WC	(Zimbabwe) B Black	2	6	3
(United States) B Gilbert	6	4	6
(Germany) K Braasch	4	5
(Sweden) T Enqvist	6	7
Q	(Canada) S Lareau	4	3
11	(Russia) Y Kafelnikov	6	6
14	(Australia) P Rafter	3	6	6^{3}
(Czech Republic) M Damm	6	3	7^{7}
WC	(United States) J Grabb	6	6
WC	(Sweden) M Wilander	4	4
(United States) A Krickstein	6	6
(Italy) S Pescosolido	3	0

Second round
LL	(United States) A O'Brien	6	6
(United States) B Gilbert	4	1
(Sweden) T Enqvist	3	7	6
11	(Russia) Y Kafelnikov	6	5	3
(Czech Republic) M Damm	4	2
WC	(United States) J Grabb	6	6
(United States) A Krickstein	2	4
3	(Germany) M Stich	6	6

Third round
LL	(United States) A O'Brien	6	6
(Sweden) T Enqvist	4	3
WC	(United States) J Grabb	2	7^{7}	6^{4}
3	(Germany) M Stich	6	6^{4}	7^{7}

Quarterfinals
LL	(United States) A O'Brien	2	4
3	(Germany) M Stich	6	6

==== Section 4 ====
First round
(Russia) A Volkov	2	6^{5}
Q	(Italy) C Caratti	6	7^{7}
(Czech Republic) D Rikl	6	0	5
(Israel) A Mansdorf	1	6	7
(Netherlands) R Krajicek	3	6	2
10	(Czech Republic) P Korda	6	4	6
15	(Italy) A Gaudenzi	3	7^{7}	6^{5}
(United States) M Washington	6	6^{4}	7^{7}
(United States) P McEnroe	5	7^{7}	6^{4}
WC	(United States) S Bryan	7	6^{3}	7^{7}
(Czech Republic) K Nováček	6^{3}	6^{4}
(Sweden) H Holm	7^{7}	7^{7}

Second round
8	(Germany) B Becker	7^{10}	6
Q	(Italy) C Caratti	6^{8}	3
(Israel) A Mansdorf	6	6
10	(Czech Republic) P Korda	3	3
(United States) M Washington	6	1	6
WC	(United States) S Bryan	4	6	4
(Sweden) H Holm	3	2
2	(Sweden) S Edberg	6	6

Third round
8	(Germany) B Becker	6^{1}	4
(Israel) A Mansdorf	7^{7}	6
(United States) M Washington	3	4
2	(Sweden) S Edberg	6	6

Quarterfinals
(Israel) A Mansdorf	7	4	r
2	(Sweden) S Edberg	5	6
