= 1994 Stockholm Open =

- Date: 24–31 October
- Edition: 26th
- Category: ATP Super 9
- Draw: 48S / 24D
- Prize money: $1,470,000
- Surface: Carpet (i)
- Location: Stockholm, Sweden
- Venue: Stockholm Globe Arena

Champions

Singles
- (Germany) Boris Becker

Doubles
- (Australia) Todd Woodbridge / (Australia) Mark Woodforde
- Stockholm Open

The 1994 Stockholm Open was a men's tennis tournament played on indoor carpet courts. It was the 26th edition of the Stockholm Open and was part of the ATP Super 9 of the 1994 ATP Tour. It took place at the Stockholm Globe Arena in Stockholm, Sweden, from 24 October until 31 October 1994. Sixth-seeded Boris Becker won the singles title.

The singles draw was headlined by world No. 1 Pete Sampras, Goran Ivanišević, and Michael Stich. Other top seeds were Sergi Bruguera, Stefan Edberg, Boris Becker, Michael Chang, and Andre Agassi.

== Finals ==
=== Singles ===
(Germany) Boris Becker defeated (Croatia) Goran Ivanišević, 4–6, 6–4, 6–3, 7–6^{(7–4)}

- It was Becker's 4th title of the year, and his 42nd overall. It was his 1st Masters title of the year and his 4th overall. It was his 4th win at Stockholm, also winning in 1992, 1991, and 1988.

=== Doubles ===
(Australia) Todd Woodbridge / (Australia) Mark Woodforde defeated (Sweden) Jan Apell / (Sweden) Jonas Björkman, 6–3, 6–4
