= 1992 Stockholm Open – Doubles =

Doubles
- 1992 Stockholm Open

Final
- Champions: (Australia) Todd Woodbridge (Australia) Mark Woodforde
- Runners-up: (United States) Steve DeVries (Australia) David Macpherson
- Score: 6–3, 6–4

Details
- Draw: 24
- Seeds: 8

Events
Singles	Doubles
- Stockholm Open

John Fitzgerald and Anders Järryd were the defending champions, but lost in the semifinals this year.

Todd Woodbridge and Mark Woodforde successfully defended their title, defeating Steve DeVries and David Macpherson 6–3, 6–4 in the final.

== Seeds ==
All seeds receive a bye into the second round.

1. (Australia) Todd Woodbridge / (Australia) Mark Woodforde (champions)
2. (United States) Kelly Jones / (United States) Rick Leach (quarterfinals)
3. (Australia) John Fitzgerald / (Sweden) Anders Järryd (semifinals)
4. (Netherlands) Tom Nijssen / (Czechoslovakia) Cyril Suk (quarterfinals)
5. (Australia) Mark Kratzmann / (Australia) Wally Masur (quarterfinals)
6. (United States) Patrick Galbraith / (South Africa) Danie Visser (second round)
7. (United States) Steve DeVries / (Australia) David Macpherson (final)
8. (United States) Luke Jensen / (Australia) Laurie Warder (second round)

== Draw ==
Key

- Q = Qualifier
- WC = Wild card
- LL = Lucky loser
- Alt = Alternate
- ITF = ITF entry
- PR = Protected ranking
- SR = Special ranking
- SE = Special exempt
- JE = Junior exempt
- JR = Junior Accelerator Programme entrant
- CO = College Accelerator Programme entrant
- NG = Next Gen Accelerator Program entrant
- w/o = Walkover
- r = Retired
- d = Defaulted

=== Finals ===
Semifinals
1	(Australia) Todd Woodbridge (Australia) Mark Woodforde	6	6	6
3	(Australia) John Fitzgerald (Sweden) Anders Järryd	7	2	4
(Canada) Grant Connell (Canada) Glenn Michibata	6	3	4
7	(United States) Steve DeVries (Australia) David Macpherson	4	6	6

Final
1	(Australia) Todd Woodbridge (Australia) Mark Woodforde	6	6
7	(United States) Steve DeVries (Australia) David Macpherson	3	4

=== Top half ===
First round
(Netherlands) HJ Davids (Belgium) L Pimek	7	7
WC	(Sweden) S Edberg (Sweden) H Holm	5	6
(United States) S Cannon (United States) G Van Emburgh	6	6
Q	(Sweden) J Apell (Sweden) M Tillström	3	4
(Sweden) J Donar (Netherlands) P Haarhuis	4	6	6
(United States) D Pate (United States) R Reneberg	6	4	4
(United States) M Briggs (United States) T Kronemann	3	4
(South Africa) W Ferreira (South Africa) P Norval	6	6

Second round
1	(Australia) T Woodbridge (Australia) M Woodforde	6	6	6
(Netherlands) HJ Davids (Belgium) L Pimek	3	7	1
(United States) S Cannon (United States) G Van Emburgh	6	7
8	(United States) L Jensen (Australia) L Warder	4	6
3	(Australia) J Fitzgerald (Sweden) A Järryd	7	7
(Sweden) J Donar (Netherlands) P Haarhuis	6	6
(South Africa) W Ferreira (South Africa) P Norval	4	3
5	(Australia) M Kratzmann (Australia) W Masur	6	6

Quarterfinals
1	(Australia) T Woodbridge (Australia) M Woodforde	6	7
(United States) S Cannon (United States) G Van Emburgh	3	5
3	(Australia) J Fitzgerald (Sweden) A Järryd	7	7
5	(Australia) M Kratzmann (Australia) W Masur	6	6

Semifinals
1	(Australia) T Woodbridge (Australia) M Woodforde	6	6	6
3	(Australia) J Fitzgerald (Sweden) A Järryd	7	2	4

=== Bottom half ===
First round
(Canada) G Connell (Canada) G Michibata	6	6
WC	(Sweden) N Kulti (Sweden) M Larsson	3	4
(United States) D Randall (South Africa) B Talbot	3	6
(Czechoslovakia) K Nováček (Spain) J Sánchez	6	7
WC	(United States) J Courier (Croatia) G Ivanišević	6	6
(South Africa) D Adams (Commonwealth of Independent States) A Olhovskiy	4	3
(United States) K Kinnear (United States) S Salumaa	6	7
(Sweden) R Båthman (Sweden) R Bergh	4	5

Second round
6	(United States) P Galbraith (South Africa) D Visser	6	0	6
(Canada) G Connell (Canada) G Michibata	2	6	7
(Czechoslovakia) K Nováček (Spain) J Sánchez	2	6
4	(Netherlands) T Nijssen (Czechoslovakia) C Suk	6	7
7	(United States) S DeVries (Australia) D Macpherson	6	6
(United States) J Courier (Croatia) G Ivanišević	4	4
(United States) K Kinnear (United States) S Salumaa	1	4
2	(United States) K Jones (United States) R Leach	6	6

Quarterfinals
(Canada) G Connell (Canada) G Michibata	3	7	6
4	(Netherlands) T Nijssen (Czechoslovakia) C Suk	6	5	4
7	(United States) S DeVries (Australia) D Macpherson	6	7
2	(United States) K Jones (United States) R Leach	2	6

Semifinals
(Canada) G Connell (Canada) G Michibata	6	3	4
7	(United States) S DeVries (Australia) D Macpherson	4	6	6
