= 1994 Canadian Open – Women's doubles =

Women's doubles
- 1994 Canadian Open

Final
- Champions: (United States) Meredith McGrath (Spain) Arantxa Sánchez Vicario
- Runners-up: (United States) Pam Shriver (Australia) Elizabeth Smylie
- Score: 2–6, 6–2, 6–4

Details
- Draw: 28 (2WC/1Q)
- Seeds: 8

Events
Singles	men	women
Doubles	men	women
- Canadian Open

Larisa Neiland and Jana Novotná were the defending champions, but Novotná opted to rest after competing consecutively in the previous two weeks, winning the title at San Diego and finishing as runner-up at Manhattan Beach. Neiland teamed up with Gabriela Sabatini and lost in the semifinals to Pam Shriver and Elizabeth Smylie.

Meredith McGrath and Arantxa Sánchez Vicario won the title by defeating Shriver and Smylie 2–6, 6–2, 6–4 in the final.

== Seeds ==
The first four seeds received a bye into the second round.

1. (United States) Meredith McGrath / (Spain) Arantxa Sánchez Vicario (champions)
2. (United States) Pam Shriver / (Australia) Elizabeth Smylie (final)
3. (United States) Lori McNeil / (Australia) Rennae Stubbs (quarterfinals)
4. (Indonesia) Yayuk Basuki / (Japan) Nana Miyagi (second round)
5. (South Africa) Amanda Coetzer / (Argentina) Patricia Tarabini (first round)
6. (Latvia) Larisa Neiland / (Argentina) Gabriela Sabatini (semifinals)
7. (Italy) Laura Golarsa / (France) Nathalie Tauziat (quarterfinals)
8. (United States) Debbie Graham / (Ukraine) Natalia Medvedeva (quarterfinals)

== Draw ==
Key

- Q = Qualifier
- WC = Wild card
- LL = Lucky loser
- Alt = Alternate
- ITF = ITF entry
- PR = Protected ranking
- SR = Special ranking
- SE = Special exempt
- JE = Junior exempt
- JR = Junior Accelerator Programme entrant
- CO = College Accelerator Programme entrant
- NG = Next Gen Accelerator Program entrant
- w/o = Walkover
- r = Retired
- d = Defaulted

=== Finals ===
Semifinals
1	(United States) Meredith McGrath (Spain) Arantxa Sánchez Vicario	6	6
(United States) Nicole Arendt (Australia) Kristine Radford	1	3
6	(Latvia) Larisa Neiland (Argentina) Gabriela Sabatini	1	6^{6}
2	(United States) Pam Shriver (Australia) Elizabeth Smylie	6	7^{8}

Final
1	(United States) Meredith McGrath (Spain) Arantxa Sánchez Vicario	2	6	6
2	(United States) Pam Shriver (Australia) Elizabeth Smylie	6	2	4

=== Top half ===
First round
(Australia) M Jaggard-Lai (Canada) R Simpson-Alter	5	6	2
(Canada) J Hetherington (United States) S Stafford	7	4	6
(Russia) E Maniokova (Georgia (country)) L Meskhi	7	3	6
(Canada) P Hy (United States) M Werdel	5	6	0
(France) A Dechaume-Balleret (Argentina) F Labat	1	1
8	(United States) D Graham (Ukraine) N Medvedeva	6	6
Q	(Italy) R Grande (South Africa) J Kruger	6	6
(Bulgaria) K Maleeva (Germany) B Rittner	3	2
WC	(Canada) S Jeyaseelan (Canada) V Webb	3	3
(Australia) R McQuillan (Netherlands) M Oremans	6	6
(United States) N Arendt (Australia) K Radford	6	7^{7}
5	(South Africa) A Coetzer (Argentina) P Tarabini	2	6^{1}

Second round
1	(United States) M McGrath (Spain) A Sánchez Vicario	2	6	6
(Canada) J Hetherington (United States) S Stafford	6	3	0
(Russia) E Maniokova (Georgia (country)) L Meskhi	3	4
8	(United States) D Graham (Ukraine) N Medvedeva	6	6
4	(Indonesia) Y Basuki (Japan) N Miyagi	3	6	4
Q	(Italy) R Grande (South Africa) J Kruger	6	2	6
(Australia) R McQuillan (Netherlands) M Oremans	4	2
(United States) N Arendt (Australia) K Radford	6	6

Quarterfinals
1	(United States) M McGrath (Spain) A Sánchez Vicario	6	6
8	(United States) D Graham (Ukraine) N Medvedeva	0	3
Q	(Italy) R Grande (South Africa) J Kruger	1	2
(United States) N Arendt (Australia) K Radford	6	6

Semifinals
1	(United States) M McGrath (Spain) A Sánchez Vicario	6	6
(United States) N Arendt (Australia) K Radford	1	3

=== Bottom half ===
First round
6	(Latvia) L Neiland (Argentina) G Sabatini	6	7
(United States) C Rubin (United States) J Steven	3	5
(Netherlands) K Boogert (Argentina) M Paz	5	0
(Australia) N Bradtke (South Africa) E Reinach	7	6
(France) I Demongeot (Austria) P Ritter	6	3	0
WC	(Canada) M Bernard (Canada) C Delisle	2	6	6
7	(Italy) L Golarsa (France) N Tauziat	5	7	6
(United States) S Collins (Italy) L Ferrando	7	5	0
(Italy) S Farina (United States) G Helgeson	7^{7}	7
(Japan) R Hiraki (South Africa) T Price	6^{1}	5
(Kazakhstan) E Likhovtseva (Croatia) I Majoli	6^{5}	6	3
(France) M Pierce (Hungary) A Temesvári	7^{7}	2	6

Second round
6	(Latvia) L Neiland (Argentina) G Sabatini	6	4	7^{7}
(Australia) N Bradtke (South Africa) E Reinach	2	6	6^{4}
WC	(Canada) M Bernard (Canada) C Delisle	2	3
3	(United States) L McNeil (Australia) R Stubbs	6	6
7	(Italy) L Golarsa (France) N Tauziat	6	6
(Italy) S Farina (United States) G Helgeson	4	0
(France) M Pierce (Hungary) A Temesvári	6	4	4
2	(United States) P Shriver (Australia) E Smylie	4	6	6

Quarterfinals
6	(Latvia) L Neiland (Argentina) G Sabatini	6	7^{7}
3	(United States) L McNeil (Australia) R Stubbs	3	6^{3}
7	(Italy) L Golarsa (France) N Tauziat	6^{0}	4
2	(United States) P Shriver (Australia) E Smylie	7^{7}	6

Semifinals
6	(Latvia) L Neiland (Argentina) G Sabatini	1	6^{6}
2	(United States) P Shriver (Australia) E Smylie	6	7^{8}
