= 1994 Canadian Open – Women's singles =

Women's singles
- 1994 Canadian Open

Final
- Champion: (Spain) Arantxa Sánchez Vicario
- Runner-up: (Germany) Steffi Graf
- Score: 7–5, 1–6, 7–6^{(7–4)}

Details
- Draw: 56 (3WC/8Q/1LL)
- Seeds: 18

Events
Singles	men	women
Doubles	men	women
- Canadian Open

Arantxa Sánchez Vicario defeated the defending champion Steffi Graf in the final, 7–5, 1–6, 7–6^{(7–4)} to win the women's singles tennis title at the 1994 Canadian Open.

== Seeds ==
The first nine seeds received a bye into the second round.

1. (Germany) Steffi Graf (final)
2. (Spain) Arantxa Sánchez Vicario (champion)
3. (Japan) Kimiko Date (semifinals)
4. (France) Mary Pierce (semifinals)
5. (Argentina) Gabriela Sabatini (quarterfinals)
6. (United States) ~~Mary Joe Fernández~~ (withdrew)
7. (South Africa) Amanda Coetzer (third round)
8. (Germany) Anke Huber (second round)
9. (United States) Lori McNeil (third round)
10. (Bulgaria) Magdalena Maleeva (second round)
11. (France) ~~Julie Halard~~ (withdrew)
12. (Croatia) Iva Majoli (second round)
13. (France) Nathalie Tauziat (second round)
14. (Japan) Naoko Sawamatsu (third round)
15. (United States) Meredith McGrath (first round)
16. (Argentina) Florencia Labat (first round)
17. (United States) Chanda Rubin (second round)
18. (Chinese Taipei) Wang Shi-ting (first round)

== Draw ==
Key

- Q = Qualifier
- WC = Wild card
- LL = Lucky loser
- Alt = Alternate
- ITF = ITF entry
- PR = Protected ranking
- SR = Special ranking
- SE = Special exempt
- JE = Junior exempt
- JR = Junior Accelerator Programme entrant
- CO = College Accelerator Programme entrant
- NG = Next Gen Accelerator Program entrant
- w/o = Walkover
- r = Retired
- d = Defaulted

=== Finals ===
Quarterfinals
1	(Germany) Steffi Graf	7	6
5	(Argentina) Gabriela Sabatini	5	0
4	(France) Mary Pierce	6	6
(Austria) Judith Wiesner	1	1
Q	(Italy) Nathalie Baudone	6	2	1
3	(Japan) Kimiko Date	4	6	6
(Bulgaria) Katerina Maleeva	2	1
2	(Spain) Arantxa Sánchez Vicario	6	6

Semifinals
1	(Germany) Steffi Graf	6	6
4	(France) Mary Pierce	3	4
3	(Japan) Kimiko Date	6	1	2
2	(Spain) Arantxa Sánchez Vicario	2	6	6

Final
1	(Germany) Steffi Graf	5	6	6^{4}
2	(Spain) Arantxa Sánchez Vicario	7	1	7^{7}

=== Top half ===
==== Section 1 ====
First round
Q	(France) I Demongeot	6^{3}	6^{6}
(United States) S Cacic	7^{7}	7^{8}
(United States) S Stafford	6	4	6
(Romania) I Spîrlea	1	6	4
Q	(France) N Herreman	5	1
14	(Japan) N Sawamatsu	7	6
10	(Bulgaria) M Maleeva	6	6
(South Africa) J Kruger	4	1
(Canada) P Hy	5	4
(Indonesia) Y Basuki	7	6
(United States) M Werdel	4	0
Q	(France) S Testud	6	6

Second round
1	(Germany) S Graf	6	6
(United States) S Cacic	2	2
(United States) S Stafford	2	7	3
14	(Japan) N Sawamatsu	6	5	6
10	(Bulgaria) M Maleeva	4	6	3
(Indonesia) Y Basuki	6	2	6
Q	(France) S Testud	1	3
5	(Argentina) G Sabatini	6	6

Third round
1	(Germany) S Graf	6	2	6
14	(Japan) N Sawamatsu	1	6	2
(Indonesia) Y Basuki	1	4
5	(Argentina) G Sabatini	6	6

Quarterfinals
1	(Germany) S Graf	7	6
5	(Argentina) G Sabatini	5	0

==== Section 2 ====
First round
(Russia) E Makarova	2	6^{1}
(Australia) R McQuillan	6	7^{7}
(Australia) K Radford	5	4
(South Africa) E Reinach	7	6
(United States) D Graham	6	3	6
18	(Chinese Taipei) S-t Wang	4	6	4
15	(United States) M McGrath	2	2
(Austria) J Wiesner	6	6
Q	(United States) A Keller	3	1
(Netherlands) K Boogert	6	6
Q	(Australia) E Smylie	2	1
(Netherlands) M Oremans	6	6

Second round
4	(France) M Pierce	6	6
(Australia) R McQuillan	3	3
(South Africa) E Reinach	3	6	6
(United States) D Graham	6	2	4
(Austria) J Wiesner	7	6
(Netherlands) K Boogert	5	3
(Netherlands) M Oremans	6	6
8	(Germany) A Huber	3	1

Third round
4	(France) M Pierce	6	6
(South Africa) E Reinach	2	1
(Austria) J Wiesner	2	7	6
(Netherlands) M Oremans	6	5	1

Quarterfinals
4	(France) M Pierce	6	6
(Austria) J Wiesner	1	1

=== Bottom half ===
==== Section 3 ====
First round
(Ukraine) N Medvedeva	0	6	4
Q	(France) A Dechaume-Balleret	6	3	6
WC	(Canada) S Jeyaseelan	6^{2}	0
Q	(Italy) N Baudone	7^{7}	6
(Italy) L Ferrando	3	1
13	(France) N Tauziat	6	6
17	(United States) C Rubin	7^{11}	6
(Latvia) L Neiland	6^{9}	3
(Israel) A Smashnova	6	6
Q	(United States) J Steven	3	3
WC	(Canada) J Nejedly	2	4
(Georgia (country)) L Meskhi	6	6

Second round
9	(United States) L McNeil	2	6	1
Q	(France) A Dechaume-Balleret	6	3	0^{r}
Q	(Italy) N Baudone	6	6
13	(France) N Tauziat	4	3
17	(United States) C Rubin	1	3
(Israel) A Smashnova	6	6
(Georgia (country)) L Meskhi	6^{7}	5
3	(Japan) K Date	7^{9}	7

Third round
9	(United States) L McNeil	7^{7}	2	4
Q	(Italy) N Baudone	6^{1}	6	6
(Israel) A Smashnova	6	2	1
3	(Japan) K Date	4	6	6

Quarterfinals
Q	(Italy) N Baudone	6	2	1
3	(Japan) K Date	4	6	6

==== Section 4 ====
First round
LL	(Hungary) A Temesvári	1	3
(Germany) B Rittner	6	6
WC	(Canada) R Simpson-Alter	6	3	2
(Austria) P Ritter	0	6	6
(Bulgaria) K Maleeva	6	6
16	(Argentina) F Labat	2	1
12	(Croatia) I Majoli	7^{7}	6
(Germany) S Frankl	6^{1}	0
(Kazakhstan) E Likhovtseva	3	6	6
(United States) G Helgeson	6	1	2
(Sweden) Å Carlsson	6	6
(Italy) S Farina	3	2

Second round
7	(South Africa) A Coetzer	5	6	6
(Germany) B Rittner	7	4	2
(Austria) P Ritter	3	2
(Bulgaria) K Maleeva	6	6
12	(Croatia) I Majoli	4	4
(Kazakhstan) E Likhovtseva	6	6
(Sweden) Å Carlsson	4	2
2	(Spain) A Sánchez Vicario	6	6

Third round
7	(South Africa) A Coetzer	5	3
(Bulgaria) K Maleeva	7	6
(Kazakhstan) E Likhovtseva	0	4
2	(Spain) A Sánchez Vicario	6	6

Quarterfinals
(Bulgaria) K Maleeva	0	1
2	(Spain) A Sánchez Vicario	6	6
