= 1992 Stockholm Open =

- Date: 26 October – 2 November
- Edition: 24th
- Category: ATP Super 9
- Draw: 64S / 32D
- Prize money: $1,040,000
- Surface: Carpet / indoor
- Location: Stockholm, Sweden
- Venue: Stockholm Globe Arena

Champions

Singles
- (Croatia) Goran Ivanišević

Doubles
- (Australia) Todd Woodbridge / (Australia) Mark Woodforde
- Stockholm Open

The 1992 Stockholm Open was a men's tennis tournament played on indoor carpet courts. It was the 24th edition of the Stockholm Open and was part of the ATP Super 9 of the 1992 ATP Tour. It took place at the Stockholm Globe Arena in Stockholm, Sweden, from 26 October through 2 November 1992. Fourth-seeded Goran Ivanišević won the singles title.

== Finals ==
=== Singles ===
(Croatia) Goran Ivanišević defeated (France) Guy Forget, 7–6^{(7–2)}, 4–6, 7–6^{(7–5)}, 6–2

- It was Goran Ivanišević's 4th title of the year, and his 6th overall. It was his 1st Masters title.

=== Doubles ===
(Australia) Todd Woodbridge / (Australia) Mark Woodforde defeated (United States) Steve DeVries / (Australia) David Macpherson, 6–3, 6–4
