= 1994 Stockholm Open – Singles =

Singles
- 1994 Stockholm Open

Final
- Champion: (Germany) Boris Becker
- Runner-up: (Croatia) Goran Ivanišević
- Score: 4–6, 6–4, 6–3, 7–6^{(7–4)}

Details
- Draw: 48
- Seeds: 16

Events
Singles	Doubles
- Stockholm Open

Boris Becker defeated Goran Ivanišević in the final, 4–6, 6–4, 6–3, 7–6^{(7–4)} to win the singles tennis title at the 1994 Stockholm Open. Becker became the first man in the Open Era to defeat the world’s top-3 players at the same tournament. He defeated No. 1, Pete Sampras in the semifinals, No. 2, Ivanišević in the final, and No. 3, Michael Stich in quarterfinals.

Michael Stich was the defending champion, but lost in the quarterfinals to Becker.

== Seeds ==
1. (United States) Pete Sampras (semifinals)
2. (Croatia) Goran Ivanišević (final)
3. (Germany) Michael Stich (quarterfinals)
4. (Spain) Sergi Bruguera (quarterfinals)
5. (Sweden) Stefan Edberg (third round)
6. (Germany) Boris Becker (champion)
7. (United States) Michael Chang (second round)
8. (United States) Todd Martin (third round)
9. (United States) Andre Agassi (quarterfinals)
10. (South Africa) Wayne Ferreira (third round)
11. (Russia) Yevgeny Kafelnikov (semifinals)
12. (Ukraine) Andriy Medvedev (second round)
13. (United States) Jim Courier (third round)
14. (Austria) Thomas Muster (second round)
15. (Switzerland) Marc Rosset (third round)
16. (Netherlands) Richard Krajicek (second round)

== Draw ==
Key

- Q = Qualifier
- WC = Wild card
- LL = Lucky loser
- Alt = Alternate
- ITF = ITF entry
- PR = Protected ranking
- SR = Special ranking
- SE = Special exempt
- JE = Junior exempt
- JR = Junior Accelerator Programme entrant
- CO = College Accelerator Programme entrant
- NG = Next Gen Accelerator Program entrant
- w/o = Walkover
- r = Retired
- d = Defaulted

=== Finals ===
Quarterfinals
1	(United States) Pete Sampras	6	6
(Sweden) Magnus Larsson	1	4
3	(Germany) Michael Stich	6^{3}	3
6	(Germany) Boris Becker	7^{7}	6
11	(Russia) Yevgeny Kafelnikov	6^{4}	6	6
4	(Spain) Sergi Bruguera	7^{7}	2	2
9	(United States) Andre Agassi	1	6	6^{8}
2	(Croatia) Goran Ivanišević	6	3	7^{10}

Semifinals
1	(United States) Pete Sampras	4	4
6	(Germany) Boris Becker	6	6
11	(Russia) Yevgeny Kafelnikov	5	4
2	(Croatia) Goran Ivanišević	7	6

Final
6	(Germany) Boris Becker	4	6	6	7^{7}
2	(Croatia) Goran Ivanišević	6	4	3	6^{4}

=== Top half ===
==== Section 1 ====
First round
Q	(Czech Republic) D Vacek	6	6^{7}	6
(Spain) C Costa	3	7^{9}	1
Q	(Australia) T Woodbridge	6^{2}	1
Q	(Sweden) C Bergström	7^{7}	6
(Australia) J Stoltenberg	6^{3}	4
(Australia) P Rafter	7^{7}	6
Q	(Australia) R Fromberg	1	6^{7}
(Sweden) M Larsson	6	7^{9}

Second round
1	(United States) P Sampras	7^{8}	6
Q	(Czech Republic) D Vacek	6^{6}	1
Q	(Sweden) C Bergström	4	4
15	(Switzerland) M Rosset	6	6
10	(South Africa) W Ferreira	3	6	6
(Australia) P Rafter	6	2	1
(Sweden) M Larsson	6	6
7	(United States) M Chang	4	3

Third round
1	(United States) P Sampras	w/o
15	(Switzerland) M Rosset
10	(South Africa) W Ferreira	1	2
(Sweden) M Larsson	6	6

Quarterfinals
1	(United States) P Sampras	6	6
(Sweden) M Larsson	1	4

==== Section 2 ====
First round
(Sweden) T Enqvist	4	6	6
(Czech Republic) P Korda	6	3	4
(Russia) A Volkov	6	6
(Austria) H Skoff	4	1
(Germany) B Karbacher	6^{6}	3
(Russia) A Chesnokov	7^{8}	6
(United States) M Washington	4	6	3
(United States) R Reneberg	6	3	6

Second round
3	(Germany) M Stich	6^{6}	6	6
(Sweden) T Enqvist	7^{8}	4	4
(Russia) A Volkov	1	4
13	(United States) J Courier	6	6
12	(Ukraine) A Medvedev	2	6	5
(Russia) A Chesnokov	6	2	7
(United States) R Reneberg	6^{3}	1
6	(Germany) B Becker	7^{7}	6

Third round
3	(Germany) M Stich	7	6
13	(United States) J Courier	5	3
(Russia) A Chesnokov	4	3
6	(Germany) B Becker	6	6

Quarterfinals
3	(Germany) M Stich	6^{3}	3
6	(Germany) B Becker	7^{7}	6

=== Bottom half ===
==== Section 3 ====
First round
Q	(Germany) L Rehmann	4	6	6
WC	(Sweden) J Björkman	6	3	4
(France) G Forget	6^{5}	6	6
(United States) A Krickstein	7^{7}	4	2
(Germany) K Braasch	6	3	2
(France) A Boetsch	4	6	6
(Australia) M Woodforde	6	6
(Spain) J Sánchez	2	2

Second round
5	(Sweden) S Edberg	6	7
Q	(Germany) L Rehmann	4	5
(France) G Forget	6^{4}	4
11	(Russia) Y Kafelnikov	7^{7}	6
14	(Austria) T Muster	6^{1}	1
(France) A Boetsch	7^{7}	6
(Australia) M Woodforde	3	6^{4}
4	(Spain) S Bruguera	6	7^{7}

Third round
5	(Sweden) S Edberg	6^{4}	2
11	(Russia) Y Kafelnikov	7^{7}	6
(France) A Boetsch	4	2
4	(Spain) S Bruguera	6	6

Quarterfinals
11	(Russia) Y Kafelnikov	6^{4}	6	6
4	(Spain) S Bruguera	7^{7}	2	2

==== Section 4 ====
First round
Q	(Sweden) J Svensson	6^{8}	2
(United States) D Wheaton	7^{10}	6
WC	(Sweden) N Kulti	6	2	7
(France) C Pioline	2	6	5
(Peru) J Yzaga	3	1
(Italy) A Gaudenzi	6	6
WC	(Sweden) J Apell	6	6
WC	(Sweden) H Holm	2	4

Second round
8	(United States) T Martin	3	6	6
(United States) D Wheaton	6	3	3
WC	(Sweden) N Kulti	6	5	3
9	(United States) A Agassi	0	7	6
16	(Netherlands) R Krajicek	4	6	3
(Italy) A Gaudenzi	6	1	6
WC	(Sweden) J Apell	7^{10}	5	4
2	(Croatia) G Ivanišević	6^{8}	7	6

Third round
8	(United States) T Martin	7^{7}	4	1
9	(United States) A Agassi	6^{4}	6	6
(Italy) A Gaudenzi	5	3
2	(Croatia) G Ivanišević	7	6

Quarterfinals
9	(United States) A Agassi	1	6	6^{8}
2	(Croatia) G Ivanišević	6	3	7^{10}
