= 1994 Thriftway ATP Championships =

- Date: August 8–15
- Edition: 93rd
- Category: ATP Super 9
- Draw: 56S / 28D
- Prize money: $1,720,000
- Surface: Hard / outdoor
- Location: Mason, Ohio, U.S.
- Venue: Lindner Family Tennis Center

Champions

Singles
- (United States) Michael Chang

Doubles
- (United States) Alex O'Brien / (Australia) Sandon Stolle
- Cincinnati Masters

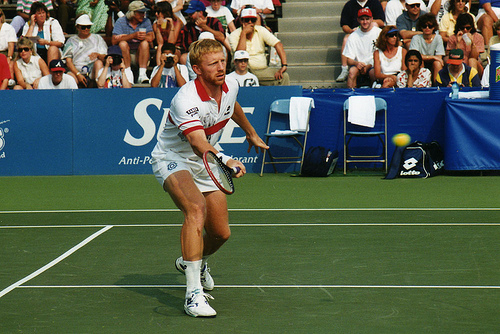
Boris Becker hitting a volley

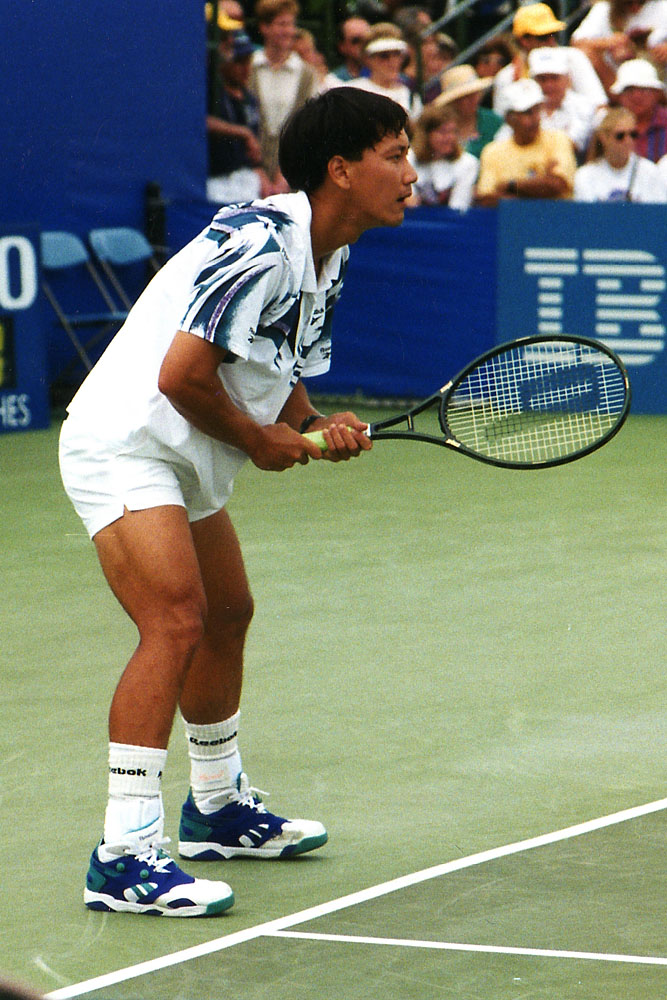
Champion Michael Chang preparing for a serve

The 1994 Cincinnati Open, known by the corporate title of the Thriftway ATP Championships was a tennis tournament played on outdoor hard courts. It was the 93rd edition of the tournament and was part of the ATP Super 9 of the 1994 ATP Tour It took place in Mason, Ohio, United States, from August 8 through August 15, 1994.

The tournament had previously appeared on the Tier III of the WTA Tour but no event was held from 1989 to 2003.

== Finals ==
=== Singles ===
(United States) Michael Chang defeated (Sweden) Stefan Edberg 6–2, 7–5

- It was Michael Chang's 5th title of the year and his 18th overall. It was his 1st Masters title of the year and his 5th overall. It was also his second title at the event after winning in 1993.

=== Doubles ===
(United States) Alex O'Brien / (Australia) Sandon Stolle defeated (South Africa) Wayne Ferreira / (Australia) Mark Kratzmann 6–7, 6–3, 6–2
