= 1994 Canadian Open – Men's singles =

Men's singles
- 1994 Canadian Open
- 1993 Champions: (Sweden) Mikael Pernfors

Final
- Champions: (United States) Andre Agassi
- Runners-up: (Australia) Jason Stoltenberg
- Score: 6–4, 6–4

Details
- Draw: 56
- Seeds: 16

Events
Singles	men	women
Doubles	men	women
- Canadian Open

Andre Agassi defeated Jason Stoltenberg in the final, 6–4, 6–4 to win the men's singles tennis title at the 1994 Canadian Open.

Mikael Pernfors was the reigning champion, but did not compete that year.

== Seeds ==
A champion seed is indicated in bold text while text in italics indicates the round in which that seed was eliminated. The top eight seeds receive a bye into the second round.

1. (Spain) Sergi Bruguera (quarterfinals)
2. (United States) Todd Martin (second round)
3. (United States) Michael Chang (third round)
4. (United States) Jim Courier (semifinals)
5. (Czech Republic) Petr Korda (second round)
6. (South Africa) Wayne Ferreira (semifinals)
7. (Switzerland) Marc Rosset (third round)
8. (United States) **Andre Agassi (champion)**
9. (Australia) Patrick Rafter (first round)
10. (Russia) Alexander Volkov (first round)
11. (Peru) Jaime Yzaga (third round)
12. (United States) Ivan Lendl (third round)
13. (United States) Aaron Krickstein (second round)
14. (United States) MaliVai Washington (quarterfinals)
15. (United States) Richey Reneberg (quarterfinals)
16. (Germany) Karsten Braasch (third round)

== Draw ==
Key

- Q = Qualifier
- WC = Wild card
- LL = Lucky loser
- Alt = Alternate
- ITF = ITF entry
- PR = Protected ranking
- SR = Special ranking
- SE = Special exempt
- JE = Junior exempt
- JR = Junior Accelerator Programme entrant
- CO = College Accelerator Programme entrant
- NG = Next Gen Accelerator Program entrant
- w/o = Walkover
- r = Retired
- d = Defaulted

=== Finals ===
Semifinals
8	(United States) **Andre Agassi**	**6**	**7**
6	(South Africa) Wayne Ferreira	4	5
4	(United States) Jim Courier	**6**	0	1
(Australia) **Jason Stoltenberg**	3	**6**	**6**

Final
8	(United States) **Andre Agassi**	**6**	**6**
(Australia) Jason Stoltenberg	4	4

=== Top half ===
==== Section 1 ====
First round
WC	(Canada) S Lareau	4	2
(United States) **J Grabb**	**6**	**6**
WC	(Canada) A Chang	**6**	2	6^{1}
Q	(United States) **A O'Brien**	3	**6**	**7^{7}**
WC	(Canada) B Kokavec	0	4
16	(Germany) **K Braasch**	**6**	**6**
9	(Australia) P Rafter	**7**	3	3
(France) **O Delaître**	5	**6**	**6**
(Sweden) H Holm	4	**6**	1
(United States) **D Wheaton**	**6**	4	**6**
(Canada) G Rusedski	4	**6**	6^{9}
(Switzerland) **J Hlasek**	**6**	3	**7^{11}**

Second round
1	(Spain) **S Bruguera**	**6**	**6**
(United States) J Grabb	1	4
Q	(United States) A O'Brien	**6**	6^{4}	6^{3}
16	(Germany) **K Braasch**	1	**7^{7}**	**7^{7}**
(France) O Delaître	**7^{7}**	6^{4}	3
(United States) **D Wheaton**	6^{4}	**7^{7}**	**6**
(Switzerland) J Hlasek	1	1
8	(United States) **A Agassi**	**6**	**6**

Third round
1	(Spain) **S Bruguera**	**6**	**6**
16	(Germany) K Braasch	3	3
(United States) D Wheaton	**6**	1	6^{7}
8	(United States) **A Agassi**	3	**6**	**7^{9}**

Quarterfinals
1	(Spain) S Bruguera	**6**	6^{2}	1
8	(United States) **A Agassi**	4	**7^{7}**	**6**

==== Section 2 ====
First round
(Czech Republic) D Rikl	3	**6**	1
(United Kingdom) **J Bates**	**6**	3	**6**
Q	(The Bahamas) **R Smith**	**7^{8}**	**7**
(Colombia) M Hadad	6^{6}	5
Q	(The Bahamas) M Knowles	**6**	3	4
14	(United States) **M Washington**	4	**6**	**6**
12	(United States) **I Lendl**	**6**	**6**
(Brazil) L Mattar	4	1
(Australia) **W Masur**	**6**	**6**
WC	(Canada) G Connell	4	2
(Sweden) J Björkman	4	1
(United States) **S Bryan**	**6**	**6**

Second round
3	(United States) **M Chang**	**6**	**6**
(United Kingdom) J Bates	1	3
Q	(The Bahamas) R Smith	**6**	2	1
14	(United States) **M Washington**	3	**6**	**6**
12	(United States) **I Lendl**	**6**	**6**
(Australia) W Masur	0	0
(United States) S Bryan	**6**	1	4
6	(South Africa) **W Ferreira**	3	**6**	**6**

Third round
3	(United States) M Chang	4	4
14	(United States) **M Washington**	**6**	**6**
12	(United States) I Lendl	3	2
6	(South Africa) **W Ferreira**	**6**	**6**

Quarterfinals
14	(United States) M Washington	**6**	5	5
6	(South Africa) **W Ferreira**	4	**7**	**7**

=== Bottom half ===
==== Section 3 ====
First round
(Austria) A Antonitsch	1	**6**	5
(Sweden) **T Enqvist**	**6**	4	**7**
(Haiti) R Agénor	0	1
(New Zealand) **B Steven**	**6**	**6**
(United States) J Palmer	4	**7^{7}**	3
11	(Peru) **J Yzaga**	**6**	6^{5}	**6**
13	(United States) **A Krickstein**	**6**	**6**
(United States) J Tarango	2	2
(Czech Republic) M Damm	**6**	2	3
(United States) **C Adams**	3	**6**	**6**
Q	(United States) R Weiss	4	**6**	6^{4}
Q	(Venezuela) **N Pereira**	**6**	3	**7^{7}**

Second round
5	(Czech Republic) P Korda	4	3
(Sweden) **T Enqvist**	**6**	**6**
(New Zealand) B Steven	5	4
11	(Peru) **J Yzaga**	**7**	**6**
13	(United States) A Krickstein	4	4
(United States) **C Adams**	**6**	**6**
Q	(Venezuela) N Pereira	6^{3}	4
4	(United States) **J Courier**	**7^{7}**	**6**

Third round
(Sweden) **T Enqvist**	2	**6**	**6**
11	(Peru) J Yzaga	**6**	3	4
(United States) C Adams	6^{1}	6^{4}
4	(United States) **J Courier**	**7^{7}**	**7^{7}**

Quarterfinals
(Sweden) T Enqvist	2	2
4	(United States) **J Courier**	**6**	**6**

==== Section 4 ====
First round
Q	(Nigeria) **S Ladipo**	**7^{7}**	**6**
(United States) J Stark	6^{3}	4
(Zimbabwe) B Black	4	4
(Australia) **J Stoltenberg**	**6**	**6**
WC	(Canada) **D Nestor**	**6**	**6**
10	(Russia) A Volkov	4	3
15	(United States) **R Reneberg**	**6**	**6**
(United States) P McEnroe	3	1
(Italy) **S Pescosolido**	**6**	3	**7^{7}**
Q	(France) L Roux	3	**6**	6^{3}
(South Africa) G Stafford	2	4
(Israel) **A Mansdorf**	**6**	**6**

Second round
7	(Switzerland) **M Rosset**	**6**	**6**
Q	(Nigeria) S Ladipo	4	4
(Australia) **J Stoltenberg**	**6**	**7**
WC	(Canada) D Nestor	4	5
15	(United States) **R Reneberg**	**6**	**6**
(Italy) S Pescosolido	4	4
(Israel) **A Mansdorf**	6^{4}	**6**
2	(United States) T Martin	**7^{7}**	3	r

Third round
7	(Switzerland) M Rosset	6^{5}	**7**	2
(Australia) **J Stoltenberg**	**7^{7}**	5	**6**
15	(United States) **R Reneberg**	2	**6**	**6**
(Israel) A Mansdorf	**6**	0	4

Quarterfinals
(Australia) **J Stoltenberg**	**6**	**6**
15	(United States) R Reneberg	2	4
