= 1994 Stockholm Open – Doubles =

Doubles
- 1994 Stockholm Open

Final
- Champions: (Australia) Todd Woodbridge (Australia) Mark Woodforde
- Runners-up: (Sweden) Jan Apell (Sweden) Jonas Björkman
- Score: 6–3, 6–4

Events
Singles	Doubles
← 1993 ·	Stockholm Open	· 1995 →

Todd Woodbridge and Mark Woodforde were the defending champions.

Woodbridge and Woodforde successfully defended their title, defeating Jan Apell and Jonas Björkman 6–3, 6–4 in the final.

== Seeds ==
All seeds receive a bye into the second round.

1. (Canada) Grant Connell / (United States) Patrick Galbraith (second round)
2. (Australia) Todd Woodbridge / (Australia) Mark Woodforde (champions)
3. (Sweden) Jan Apell / (Sweden) Jonas Björkman (final)
4. (United States) Patrick McEnroe / (United States) Jared Palmer (semifinals)
5. (South Africa) David Adams / (Russia) Andrei Olhovskiy (second round)
6. (Netherlands) Tom Nijssen / (Czech Republic) Cyril Suk (second round)
7. (Netherlands) Menno Oosting / (Czech Republic) Daniel Vacek (second round)
8. (United States) Scott Melville / (South Africa) Piet Norval (second round)

== Draw ==
=== Key ===
- Q = Qualifier
- WC = Wild card
- LL = Lucky loser
- Alt = Alternate
- SE = Special exempt
- PR = Protected ranking
- ITF = ITF entry
- JE = Junior exempt
- w/o = Walkover
- r = Retired
- d = Defaulted
- SR = Special ranking

=== Finals ===
Semifinals
Q	(United States) Mark Keil (Sweden) Peter Nyborg	5	5
3	(Sweden) Jan Apell (Sweden) Jonas Björkman	7	7
4	(United States) Patrick McEnroe (United States) Jared Palmer	4	6	6
2	(Australia) Todd Woodbridge (Australia) Mark Woodforde	6	4	7

Final
3	(Sweden) Jan Apell (Sweden) Jonas Björkman	3	4
2	(Australia) Todd Woodbridge (Australia) Mark Woodforde	6	6

=== Top half ===
First round
(Sweden) H Holm (Sweden) A Järryd	3	5^{r}
Q	(United States) M Keil (Sweden) P Nyborg	6	3
(United States) M Bauer (United States) S Cannon	1	4
(Australia) M Kratzmann (Spain) J Sánchez	6	6
(United States) S Davis (United States) R Reneberg	6	6	3
(South Africa) J-L de Jager (Australia) J Fitzgerald	7	3	6
WC	(Germany) B Becker (United States) L Jensen	6	5
WC	(Sweden) T Enqvist (Sweden) N Kulti	7	7

Second round
1	(Canada) G Connell (United States) P Galbraith	2	6	6
Q	(United States) M Keil (Sweden) P Nyborg	6	3	7
(Australia) M Kratzmann (Spain) J Sánchez	6	3	7
8	(United States) S Melville (South Africa) P Norval	3	6	5
3	(Sweden) J Apell (Sweden) J Björkman	7	6	6
(South Africa) J-L de Jager (Australia) J Fitzgerald	6	7	4
WC	(Sweden) T Enqvist (Sweden) N Kulti	6	7
5	(South Africa) D Adams (Russia) A Olhovskiy	4	6

Quarterfinals
Q	(United States) M Keil (Sweden) P Nyborg	6	3	7
(Australia) M Kratzmann (Spain) J Sánchez	4	6	6
3	(Sweden) J Apell (Sweden) J Björkman	5	6	7
WC	(Sweden) T Enqvist (Sweden) N Kulti	7	4	6

Semifinals
Q	(United States) M Keil (Sweden) P Nyborg	5	5
3	(Sweden) J Apell (Sweden) J Björkman	7	7

=== Bottom half ===
First round
(United States) A O'Brien (Australia) S Stolle	6	6
(United States) B Pearce (United States) D Randall	0	4
(United States) F Montana (United States) J Pugh	0	4
(South Africa) G Muller (South Africa) D Visser	6	6
(The Bahamas) M Knowles (Canada) S Lareau	4	5
(Netherlands) HJ Davids (Russia) Y Kafelnikov	6	7
WC	(United States) A Agassi (United States) B Gilbert	4	6
WC	(Sweden) C Bergström (Sweden) J Svensson	6	7

Second round
6	(Netherlands) T Nijssen (Czech Republic) C Suk	6	4
(United States) A O'Brien (Australia) S Stolle	7	6
(South Africa) G Muller (South Africa) D Visser	7	6	4
4	(United States) P McEnroe (United States) J Palmer	6	7	6
7	(Netherlands) M Oosting (Czech Republic) D Vacek	4	6	3
(Netherlands) HJ Davids (Russia) Y Kafelnikov	6	4	6
WC	(Sweden) C Bergström (Sweden) J Svensson	1	2
2	(Australia) T Woodbridge (Australia) M Woodforde	6	6

Quarterfinals
(United States) A O'Brien (Australia) S Stolle	4	4
4	(United States) P McEnroe (United States) J Palmer	6	6
(Netherlands) HJ Davids (Russia) Y Kafelnikov	4	4
2	(Australia) T Woodbridge (Australia) M Woodforde	6	6

Semifinals
4	(United States) P McEnroe (United States) J Palmer	4	6	6
2	(Australia) T Woodbridge (Australia) M Woodforde	6	4	7
