= 1994 Thriftway ATP Championships – Doubles =

Doubles
- 1994 Thriftway ATP Championships

Final
- Champions: (United States) Alex O'Brien (Australia) Sandon Stolle
- Runners-up: (South Africa) Wayne Ferreira (Australia) Mark Kratzmann
- Score: 6–7, 6–3, 6–2

Details
- Draw: 28 (3WC/2Q)
- Seeds: 8

Events
Singles	Doubles
← 1993 ·	Cincinnati Masters	· 1995 →

Andre Agassi and Petr Korda were the defending champions, but Agassi did not compete this year. Korda teamed up with Stefan Edberg and lost in second round to Cyril Suk and Daniel Vacek.

Alex O'Brien and Sandon Stolle won the title by defeating Wayne Ferreira and Mark Kratzmann 6–7, 6–3, 6–2 in the final.

== Seeds ==
The top four seeds received a bye to the second round.

1. (Zimbabwe) Byron Black / (United States) Jonathan Stark (quarterfinals)
2. (Canada) Grant Connell / (United States) Patrick Galbraith (quarterfinals)
3. (Australia) Todd Woodbridge / (Australia) Mark Woodforde (semifinals)
4. (United States) Patrick McEnroe / (United States) Jared Palmer (semifinals)
5. (Czech Republic) Cyril Suk / (Czech Republic) Daniel Vacek (quarterfinals)
6. (Russia) Yevgeny Kafelnikov / (Czech Republic) David Rikl (first round)
7. (United States) Scott Melville / (South Africa) Piet Norval (first round)
8. (Czech Republic) Martin Damm / (Czech Republic) Karel Nováček (first round)

== Draw ==
=== Key ===
- Q = Qualifier
- WC = Wild card
- LL = Lucky loser
- Alt = Alternate
- SE = Special exempt
- PR = Protected ranking
- ITF = ITF entry
- JE = Junior exempt
- w/o = Walkover
- r = Retired
- d = Defaulted
- SR = Special ranking

=== Finals ===
Semifinals
(United States) Alex O'Brien (Australia) Sandon Stolle	3	6	7
3	(Australia) Todd Woodbridge (Australia) Mark Woodforde	6	3	6
4	(United States) Patrick McEnroe (United States) Jared Palmer	6	7	3
(South Africa) Wayne Ferreira (Australia) Mark Kratzmann	7	6	6

Final
(United States) Alex O'Brien (Australia) Sandon Stolle	6	6	6
(South Africa) Wayne Ferreira (Australia) Mark Kratzmann	7	3	2

=== Top half ===
First round
(Sweden) H Holm (New Zealand) B Steven	7	6
(Germany) MK Goellner (Australia) P Rafter	5	4
(United States) S Davis (Mexico) J Lozano	4	4
(United States) J Grabb (United States) R Reneberg	6	6
(United States) A O'Brien (Australia) S Stolle	2	6	6
7	(United States) S Melville (South Africa) P Norval	6	2	3
WC	(Germany) K Braasch (Germany) M Stich	4	4
(United States) M Bauer (Canada) S Lareau	6	6
Q	(South Africa) L Bale (South Africa) E Ferreira	7	7
(France) O Delaître (Netherlands) J Siemerink	6	6
WC	(Australia) D Cahill (Australia) J Fitzgerald	6	6	6
6	(Russia) Y Kafelnikov (Czech Republic) D Rikl	3	7	3

Second round
1	(Zimbabwe) B Black (United States) J Stark	4	6	6
(Sweden) H Holm (New Zealand) B Steven	6	4	1
(United States) J Grabb (United States) R Reneberg	3	3
(United States) A O'Brien (Australia) S Stolle	6	6
3	(Australia) T Woodbridge (Australia) M Woodforde	2	7	6
(United States) M Bauer (Canada) S Lareau	6	6	4
Q	(South Africa) L Bale (South Africa) E Ferreira	4	7	6
WC	(Australia) D Cahill (Australia) J Fitzgerald	6	6	3

Quarterfinals
1	(Zimbabwe) B Black (United States) J Stark	6	6	3
(United States) A O'Brien (Australia) S Stolle	7	3	6
3	(Australia) T Woodbridge (Australia) M Woodforde	6	6
Q	(South Africa) L Bale (South Africa) E Ferreira	4	3

Semifinals
(United States) A O'Brien (Australia) S Stolle	3	6	7
3	(Australia) T Woodbridge (Australia) M Woodforde	6	3	6

=== Bottom half ===
First round
5	(Czech Republic) C Suk (Czech Republic) D Vacek	6	6
Q	(Australia) G Doyle (Venezuela) N Pereira	4	4
(United States) R Leach (South Africa) D Visser	4	4
WC	(Sweden) S Edberg (Czech Republic) P Korda	6	6
(Sweden) J Apell (Sweden) N Kulti	3	4
(United States) D Flach (United States) K Flach	6	6
8	(Czech Republic) M Damm (Czech Republic) K Nováček	4	4
WC	(United States) L Jensen (United States) M Jensen	6	6
(South Africa) W Ferreira (Australia) M Kratzmann	4	7	6
(United States) B Pearce (South Africa) B Talbot	6	5	2
(South Africa) JL de Jager (United States) J Pugh	6	3
(United States) S Cannon (United States) D Randall	7	6

Second round
5	(Czech Republic) C Suk (Czech Republic) D Vacek	6	6
WC	(Sweden) S Edberg (Czech Republic) P Korda	4	4
(United States) D Flach (United States) K Flach	1	4
4	(United States) P McEnroe (United States) J Palmer	6	6
WC	(United States) L Jensen (United States) M Jensen	4	6	4
(South Africa) W Ferreira (Australia) M Kratzmann	6	1	6
(United States) S Cannon (United States) D Randall	5	3
2	(Canada) G Connell (United States) P Galbraith	7	6

Quarterfinals
5	(Czech Republic) C Suk (Czech Republic) D Vacek	6	6	3
4	(United States) P McEnroe (United States) J Palmer	7	3	6
(South Africa) W Ferreira (Australia) M Kratzmann	6	7
2	(Canada) G Connell (United States) P Galbraith	4	6

Semifinals
4	(United States) P McEnroe (United States) J Palmer	6	7	3
(South Africa) W Ferreira (Australia) M Kratzmann	7	6	6

== Qualifying ==
=== Qualifying seeds ===
1. (South Africa) Lan Bale / (South Africa) Ellis Ferreira (qualified)
2. (United States) Kent Kinnear / (United States) David Wheaton (first round)
3. (Australia) Andrew Kratzmann / (Zimbabwe) Kevin Ullyett (qualifying competition)
4. (France) Jean-Philippe Fleurian / (South Africa) Stefan Kruger (qualifying competition)

=== Qualifiers ===
1. (South Africa) Lan Bale / (South Africa) Ellis Ferreira
2. (Australia) Grant Doyle / (Venezuela) Nicolás Pereira

==== First qualifier ====
First round					Qualifying competition
1	(South Africa) Lan Bale (South Africa) Ellis Ferreira	7	6
WC	(United States) Jeff Wolf (United States) Jason Yeager	6	4		1	(South Africa) Lan Bale (South Africa) Ellis Ferreira	3	6	6
WC	(Italy) Stefano Pescosolido (Russia) Alexander Volkov	6	3	5	3	(Australia) Andrew Kratzmann (Zimbabwe) Kevin Ullyett	6	4	2
3	(Australia) Andrew Kratzmann (Zimbabwe) Kevin Ullyett	3	6	7

==== Second qualifier ====
First round					Qualifying competition
2	(United States) Kent Kinnear (United States) David Wheaton	3	6	6
WC	(Australia) Grant Doyle (Venezuela) Nicolás Pereira	6	3	7	WC	(Australia) Grant Doyle (Venezuela) Nicolás Pereira	6	6
WC	(United States) Bret Garnett (United States) Kenny Thorne	6	3	4	4	(France) Jean-Philippe Fleurian (South Africa) Stefan Kruger	3	3
4	(France) Jean-Philippe Fleurian (South Africa) Stefan Kruger	3	6	6
