= 1994 Canadian Open – Men's doubles =

Men's doubles
- 1994 Canadian Open

Final
- Champions: (Zimbabwe) Byron Black (United States) Jonathan Stark
- Runners-up: (United States) Patrick McEnroe (United States) Jared Palmer
- Score: 6–4, 6–4

Details
- Draw: 28
- Seeds: 8

Events
Singles	men	women
Doubles	men	women
- Canadian Open

Jim Courier and Mark Knowles were the defending champions, but lost in semifinals to Byron Black and Jonathan Stark.

Byron Black and Jonathan Stark won the title by defeating Patrick McEnroe and Jared Palmer 6–4, 6–4 in the final.

== Seeds ==
The first four seeds received a bye into the second round.

1. (Zimbabwe) Byron Black / (United States) Jonathan Stark (champions)
2. (Canada) Grant Connell / (United States) Patrick Galbraith (second round)
3. (United States) Patrick McEnroe / (United States) Jared Palmer (final)
4. (Sweden) Henrik Holm / (Sweden) Anders Järryd (second round)
5. (Czech Republic) Petr Korda / (Australia) Todd Woodbridge (first round)
6. (Czech Republic) Martin Damm / (New Zealand) Brett Steven (quarterfinals)
7. (Czech Republic) David Rikl / (United States) Bryan Shelton (first round)
8. (United States) Mike Bauer / (United States) Scott Melville (first round)

== Draw ==
Key

- Q = Qualifier
- WC = Wild card
- LL = Lucky loser
- Alt = Alternate
- ITF = ITF entry
- PR = Protected ranking
- SR = Special ranking
- SE = Special exempt
- JE = Junior exempt
- JR = Junior Accelerator Programme entrant
- CO = College Accelerator Programme entrant
- NG = Next Gen Accelerator Program entrant
- w/o = Walkover
- r = Retired
- d = Defaulted

=== Finals ===
Semifinals
1	(Zimbabwe) Byron Black (United States) Jonathan Stark	6	7	6
(United States) Jim Courier (The Bahamas) Mark Knowles	7	5	2
3	(United States) Patrick McEnroe (United States) Jared Palmer	6	6
(Canada) Daniel Nestor (United States) Alex O'Brien	3	2

Finals
1	(Zimbabwe) Byron Black (United States) Jonathan Stark	6	6
3	(United States) Patrick McEnroe (United States) Jared Palmer	4	4

=== Top half ===
First round
WC	(Canada) B Kokavec (Canada) J Robichaud	4	7	7
(South Africa) L Bale (South Africa) W Ferreira	6	5	6
(Switzerland) J Hlasek (Australia) P Rafter	6	6
(United States) B Pearce (South Africa) G Stafford	3	3
WC	(Canada) A Chang (Canada) B Gyetko	7	3	6
7	(Czech Republic) D Rikl (United States) B Shelton	6	6	3
(United States) J Courier (The Bahamas) M Knowles	6	6	7
(South Africa) M Barnard (Sweden) P Nyborg	7	3	6
Q	(United States) T Nelson (The Bahamas) R Smith	5	4
(Mexico) J Lozano (Venezuela) N Pereira	7	6
(France) O Delaître (United States) J Tarango	6	7
5	(Czech Republic) P Korda (Australia) T Woodbridge	3	6

Second round
1	(Zimbabwe) B Black (United States) J Stark	6	6
WC	(Canada) B Kokavec (Canada) J Robichaud	3	3
(Switzerland) J Hlasek (Australia) P Rafter	5	6
WC	(Canada) A Chang (Canada) B Gyetko	7	7
4	(Sweden) H Holm (Sweden) A Järryd	1	6	3
(United States) J Courier (The Bahamas) M Knowles	6	3	6
(Mexico) J Lozano (Venezuela) N Pereira	3	4
(France) O Delaître (United States) J Tarango	6	6

Quarterfinals
1	(Zimbabwe) B Black (United States) J Stark	6	7
WC	(Canada) A Chang (Canada) B Gyetko	4	5
(United States) J Courier (The Bahamas) M Knowles	2	6	6
(France) O Delaître (United States) J Tarango	6	1	2

Semifinals
1	(Zimbabwe) B Black (United States) J Stark	5	7	6
(United States) J Courier (The Bahamas) M Knowles	7	5	2

=== Bottom half ===
First round
6	(Czech Republic) M Damm (New Zealand) B Steven	6	1	6
(Australia) W Masur (United States) D Pate	4	6	3
(United States) P Annacone (United States) J Pugh	2	6	6
WC	(Canada) S Lareau (Canada) S Leblanc	6	3	2
Q	(Brazil) D Marcelino (Italy) S Pescosolido	4	3
(United States) B Garnett (United States) K Kinnear	6	6
8	(United States) M Bauer (United States) S Melville	6	3
(Canada) D Nestor (United States) A O'Brien	7	6
WC	(United States) A Agassi (United States) J Grabb	6	7	7
(United States) S Davis (United States) T Martin	7	6	6
(South Africa) E Ferreira (United States) D Randall	7	7
(Sweden) R Bergh (United States) D Johnson	6	5

Second round
6	(Czech Republic) M Damm (New Zealand) B Steven	6	6
(United States) P Annacone (United States) J Pugh	3	4
(United States) B Garnett (United States) K Kinnear	6	4
3	(United States) P McEnroe (United States) J Palmer	7	6
(Canada) D Nestor (United States) A O'Brien	6	6
WC	(United States) A Agassi (United States) J Grabb	3	4
(South Africa) E Ferreira (United States) D Randall	6	6	7
2	(Canada) G Connell (United States) P Galbraith	4	7	5

Quarterfinals
6	(Czech Republic) M Damm (New Zealand) B Steven	6	6
3	(United States) P McEnroe (United States) J Palmer	7	7
(Canada) D Nestor (United States) A O'Brien	6	6
(South Africa) E Ferreira (United States) D Randall	3	4

Semifinals
3	(United States) P McEnroe (United States) J Palmer	6	6
(Canada) D Nestor (United States) A O'Brien	3	2
