= 1994 Canadian Open (tennis) =

Tennis tournament

- Date: July 25–31 (men); August 15–21 (women)
- Edition: 105th
- Surface: Hard / outdoor

Champions

Men's singles
- (United States) Andre Agassi

Women's singles
- (Spain) Arantxa Sánchez Vicario

Men's doubles
- (Zimbabwe) Byron Black / (United States) Jonathan Stark

Women's doubles
- (United States) Meredith McGrath / (Spain) Arantxa Sánchez Vicario
- Canadian Open

The 1994 Canadian Open and the 1994 Matinée Ltd. - Canadian Open were tennis tournaments played on outdoor hard courts. It was the 105th edition of the Canada Masters, and was part of the ATP Super 9 of the 1994 ATP Tour, and of the Tier I Series of the 1994 WTA Tour. The men's event took place at the National Tennis Centre in Toronto, Ontario, Canada, from July 25 through July 31, 1994, and the women's event at the Uniprix Stadium in Montreal, Quebec, Canada, from August 15 through August 21, 1994.

== Finals ==
=== Men's singles ===
(United States) Andre Agassi defeated (Australia) Jason Stoltenberg 6–4, 6–4

- It was Agassi's 2nd title of the year, and his 21st overall. It was his 1st Masters title of the year and his 3rd overall. It was also his 2nd win in Canada after winning in 1992.

=== Women's singles ===
(Spain) Arantxa Sánchez Vicario defeated (Germany) Steffi Graf 7–5, 1–6, 7–6^{(7–4)}

- It was Sánchez Vicario's 5th title of the year, and her 17th overall. It was her 1st Tier I title of the year and her 4th overall. It was also her 2nd win in Canada after winning in 1992.

=== Men's doubles ===
(Zimbabwe) Byron Black / (United States) Jonathan Stark defeated (United States) Patrick McEnroe / (United States) Jared Palmer 6–4, 6–4

=== Women's doubles ===
(United States) Meredith McGrath / (Spain) Arantxa Sánchez Vicario defeated (United States) Pam Shriver / (Australia) Elizabeth Smylie 2–6, 6–2, 6–4
