= 1993 Monte Carlo Open – Doubles =

Doubles
- 1993 Monte Carlo Open

Final
- Champions: (Sweden) Stefan Edberg (Czech Republic) Petr Korda
- Runners-up: (Netherlands) Paul Haarhuis (Netherlands) Mark Koevermans
- Score: 3–6, 6–2, 7–6

Details
- Seeds: 8

Events
Singles	Doubles
← 1992 ·	Monte Carlo Open	· 1994 →

Boris Becker and Michael Stich were the defending champions, but Becker did not compete this year. Stich teamed up with Udo Riglewski and lost in quarterfinals to Sergio Casal and Emilio Sánchez.

Stefan Edberg and Petr Korda won the title by defeating Paul Haarhuis and Mark Koevermans 3–6, 6–2, 7–6 in the final.

== Seeds ==
The top four seeds received a bye to the second round.

1. (Switzerland) Jakob Hlasek / (Switzerland) Marc Rosset (second round)
2. (Australia) David Macpherson / (Australia) Laurie Warder (second round)
3. (South Africa) David Adams / (Russia) Andrei Olhovskiy (semifinals)
4. (Canada) Grant Connell / (United States) Patrick Galbraith (second round)
5. (Netherlands) Tom Nijssen / (Czech Republic) Cyril Suk (first round)
6. (Spain) Sergio Casal / (Spain) Emilio Sánchez (semifinals)
7. (n/a)
8. (Netherlands) Paul Haarhuis / (Netherlands) Mark Koevermans (final)

== Draw ==
=== Key ===
- Q = Qualifier
- WC = Wild card
- LL = Lucky loser
- Alt = Alternate
- SE = Special exempt
- PR = Protected ranking
- ITF = ITF entry
- JE = Junior exempt
- w/o = Walkover
- r = Retired
- d = Defaulted
- SR = Special ranking

=== Finals ===
Semifinals
8	(Netherlands) Paul Haarhuis (Netherlands) Mark Koevermans	6	6
3	(South Africa) David Adams (Russia) Andrei Olhovskiy	4	2
6	(Spain) Sergio Casal (Spain) Emilio Sánchez	3	4
(Sweden) Stefan Edberg (Czech Republic) Petr Korda	6	6

Final
8	(Netherlands) Paul Haarhuis (Netherlands) Mark Koevermans	6	2	6
(Sweden) Stefan Edberg (Czech Republic) Petr Korda	3	6	7

=== Top half ===
First round
(Netherlands) R Krajicek (Netherlands) J Siemerink	7	7
WC	(Croatia) G Ivanišević (Croatia) G Prpić	6	6
(Italy) O Camporese (Italy) D Nargiso	6	3
(Sweden) R Båthman (Brazil) C Motta	7	6
(South Africa) M Ondruska (Spain) J Sánchez	4	2
8	(Netherlands) P Haarhuis (Netherlands) M Koevermans	6	6
(Sweden) R Bergh (South Africa) B Talbot	4	3
(United States) L Jensen (United States) M Jensen	6	6
(South Africa) S Kruger (South Africa) P Norval	2	4
WC	(France) O Delaître (Germany) MK Goellner	6	6
Q	(Czech Republic) V Flégl (Denmark) M Mortensen	6	2	6
5	(Netherlands) T Nijssen (Czech Republic) C Suk	2	6	4

Second round
1	(Switzerland) J Hlasek (Switzerland) M Rosset	4	2
(Netherlands) R Krajicek (Netherlands) J Siemerink	6	6
(Sweden) R Båthman (Brazil) C Motta	7	4	2
8	(Netherlands) P Haarhuis (Netherlands) M Koevermans	6	6	6
3	(South Africa) D Adams (Russia) A Olhovskiy	6	6
(United States) L Jensen (United States) M Jensen	3	4
WC	(France) O Delaître (Germany) MK Goellner	2	3
Q	(Czech Republic) V Flégl (Denmark) M Mortensen	6	6

Quarterfinals
(Netherlands) R Krajicek (Netherlands) J Siemerink	2	2
8	(Netherlands) P Haarhuis (Netherlands) M Koevermans	6	6
3	(South Africa) D Adams (Russia) A Olhovskiy	6	6
Q	(Czech Republic) V Flégl (Denmark) M Mortensen	2	3

Semifinals
8	(Netherlands) P Haarhuis (Netherlands) M Koevermans	6	6
3	(South Africa) D Adams (Russia) A Olhovskiy	4	2

=== Bottom half ===
First round
6	(Spain) S Casal (Spain) E Sánchez	7	7
(United States) J Pugh (United States) G Van Emburgh	5	6
(United States) P Annacone (Australia) J Fitzgerald	2	4
(Netherlands) M Oosting (Norway) BO Pedersen	6	6
(France) G Forget (France) H Leconte	7	6	4
(Germany) U Riglewski (Germany) M Stich	5	7	6
Q	(Ukraine) O Dolgopolov Sr. (Ukraine) A Medvedev	1	4
LL	(Mexico) J Lozano (United States) F Montana	6	6
(United States) M Bauer (United States) B Garnett	0	4
WC	(Sweden) S Edberg (Czech Republic) P Korda	6	6
WC	(Czech Republic) K Nováček (Germany) CU Steeb	6	6
(Sweden) J Donar (Czech Republic) L Pimek	3	4

Second round
6	(Spain) S Casal (Spain) E Sánchez	6	4	6
(Netherlands) M Oosting (Norway) BO Pedersen	4	6	3
(Germany) U Riglewski (Germany) M Stich	7	6
4	(Canada) G Connell (United States) P Galbraith	5	3
LL	(Mexico) J Lozano (United States) F Montana	7	3	1
WC	(Sweden) S Edberg (Czech Republic) P Korda	5	6	6
WC	(Czech Republic) K Nováček (Germany) CU Steeb	6	6
2	(Australia) D Macpherson (Australia) L Warder	4	2

Quarterfinals
6	(Spain) S Casal (Spain) E Sánchez	6	2	7
(Germany) U Riglewski (Germany) M Stich	2	6	5
WC	(Sweden) S Edberg (Czech Republic) P Korda	6	6
WC	(Czech Republic) K Nováček (Germany) CU Steeb	1	0

Semifinals
6	(Spain) S Casal (Spain) E Sánchez	3	4
WC	(Sweden) S Edberg (Czech Republic) P Korda	6	6
