= 1996 Monte Carlo Open =

- Date: 22–28 April
- Edition: 90th
- Category: ATP Super 9
- Draw: 56S / 28D
- Prize money: $1,950,000
- Surface: Clay / outdoor
- Location: Roquebrune-Cap-Martin, France
- Venue: Monte Carlo Country Club

Champions

Singles
- (Austria) Thomas Muster

Doubles
- (South Africa) Ellis Ferreira / (Netherlands) Jan Siemerink
← 1995 ·	Monte Carlo Open	· 1997 →

The 1996 Monte Carlo Open was a men's tennis tournament played on outdoor clay courts. It was the 90th edition of the Monte Carlo Masters and was part of the Mercedes Super 9 of the 1996 ATP Tour. It took place at the Monte Carlo Country Club in Roquebrune-Cap-Martin in France from 22 April until 28 April 1996. First-seeded Thomas Muster won the singles title, his third at the event after 1992 and 1995. It was also his 4th final after previously losing in 1990.

== Finals ==
=== Singles ===
(Austria) Thomas Muster defeated (Spain) Albert Costa 6–3, 5–7, 4–6, 6–3, 6–2

- It was Muster's 4th singles title of the year and the 39th of his career.

=== Doubles ===
(South Africa) Ellis Ferreira / (Netherlands) Jan Siemerink defeated (Sweden) Jonas Björkman / (Sweden) Nicklas Kulti 2–6, 6–3, 6–2

- It was Ferreira's 2nd title of the year and the 3rd of his career. It was Siemerink's 2nd title of the year and the 9th of his career.
