= 1995 Monte Carlo Open – Doubles =

Doubles
- 1995 Monte Carlo Open

Final
- Champions: (Netherlands) Jacco Eltingh (Netherlands) Paul Haarhuis
- Runners-up: (Argentina) Luis Lobo (Spain) Javier Sánchez
- Score: 6–3, 6–4

Details
- Draw: 28 (4WC/2Q/1LL)
- Seeds: 8

Events
| Singles | Doubles |
| ← 1994 · | Monte-Carlo Masters | · 1996 → |

Nicklas Kulti and Magnus Larsson were the defending champions, but lost in second round to Lan Bale and John-Laffnie de Jager.

Jacco Eltingh and Paul Haarhuis won the title by defeating Luis Lobo and Javier Sánchez 6–3, 6–4 in the final.

== Seeds ==
The top four seeds received a bye into the second round.

1. (Netherlands) Jacco Eltingh / (Netherlands) Paul Haarhuis (champions)
2. (Zimbabwe) Byron Black / (Australia) Mark Woodforde (second round)
3. (Canada) Grant Connell / (United States) Patrick Galbraith (second round)
4. (Sweden) Nicklas Kulti / (Sweden) Magnus Larsson (second round)
5. (Russia) Yevgeny Kafelnikov / (Czech Republic) David Rikl (quarterfinals)
6. (Spain) Sergio Casal / (Spain) Emilio Sánchez (second round)
7. (United States) Trevor Kronemann / (Australia) David Macpherson (second round)
8. (Czech Republic) Cyril Suk / (Czech Republic) Daniel Vacek (first round)

== Draw ==
=== Key ===
- Q = Qualifier
- WC = Wild card
- LL = Lucky loser
- Alt = Alternate
- ITF = ITF entry
- PR = Protected ranking
- SR = Special ranking
- SE = Special exempt
- JE = Junior exempt
- JR = Junior Accelerator Programme entrant
- CO = College Accelerator Programme entrant
- NG = Next Gen Accelerator Program entrant
- w/o = Walkover
- r = Retired
- d = Defaulted

=== Finals ===
Semifinals
1 | (Netherlands) Jacco Eltingh (Netherlands) Paul Haarhuis | 6 | 6
(Netherlands) Tom Nijssen (Netherlands) Menno Oosting | 3 | 4
WC | (Germany) Boris Becker (France) Guy Forget | 2 | 2
(Argentina) Luis Lobo (Spain) Javier Sánchez | 6 | 6

Final
1 | (Netherlands) Jacco Eltingh (Netherlands) Paul Haarhuis | 6 | 6
(Argentina) Luis Lobo (Spain) Javier Sánchez | 3 | 4

=== Top half ===
First round
Q | (Czech Republic) V Flégl (Netherlands) T Kempers | 7 | 2 | 1
(Sweden) J Björkman (Sweden) M Tillström | 6 | 6 | 6
(United States) D Randall (United States) G Van Emburgh | 6 | 6
(United States) R Leach (United States) S Melville | 1 | 3
(South Africa) G Muller (South Africa) P Norval | 6 | 6
8 | (Czech Republic) C Suk (Czech Republic) D Vacek | 3 | 4
(Netherlands) T Nijssen (Netherlands) M Oosting | 3 | 7 | 7
(France) O Delaître (France) G Raoux | 6 | 6 | 6
(United States) L Jensen (United States) M Jensen | 1 | 4
(Spain) T Carbonell (Netherlands) J Siemerink | 6 | 6
(Czech Republic) P Korda (Czech Republic) K Nováček | 2 | 4
5 | (Russia) Y Kafelnikov (Czech Republic) D Rikl | 6 | 6

Second round
1 | (Netherlands) J Eltingh (Netherlands) P Haarhuis | 6 | 3 | 6
(Sweden) J Björkman (Sweden) M Tillström | 1 | 6 | 3
(United States) D Randall (United States) G Van Emburgh | 7 | 7
(South Africa) G Muller (South Africa) P Norval | 5 | 6
3 | (Canada) G Connell (United States) P Galbraith | 4 | 6 | 2
(Netherlands) T Nijssen (Netherlands) M Oosting | 6 | 1 | 6
(Spain) T Carbonell (Netherlands) J Siemerink | 6 | 6 | 4
5 | (Russia) Y Kafelnikov (Czech Republic) D Rikl | 3 | 7 | 6

Quarterfinals
1 | (Netherlands) J Eltingh (Netherlands) P Haarhuis | 6 | 4 | 7
(United States) D Randall (United States) G Van Emburgh | 2 | 6 | 6
(Netherlands) T Nijssen (Netherlands) M Oosting | 6 | 6
5 | (Russia) Y Kafelnikov (Czech Republic) D Rikl | 4 | 4

Semifinals
1 | (Netherlands) J Eltingh (Netherlands) P Haarhuis | 6 | 6
(Netherlands) T Nijssen (Netherlands) M Oosting | 3 | 4

=== Bottom half ===
First round
6 | (Spain) S Casal (Spain) E Sánchez | 7 | 6
WC | (Germany) U Riglewski (Germany) M Stich | 5 | 4
WC | (Germany) B Becker (France) G Forget | 2 | 6 | 6
WC | (Iran) M Bahrami (France) H Leconte | 6 | 3 | 1
(South Africa) L Bale (South Africa) JL de Jager | 6 | 4 | 6
(Russia) A Olhovskiy (Australia) P Rafter | 4 | 6 | 3
7 | (United States) T Kronemann (Australia) D Macpherson | 6 | 6
(United States) M Bauer (Sweden) H Holm | 4 | 4
WC | (Italy) A Gaudenzi (Croatia) G Ivanišević | 6 | 6
Q | (France) JP Fleurian (France) R Gilbert | 2 | 4
(Argentina) L Lobo (Spain) J Sánchez | 6 | 7
LL | (Australia) J Ireland (Belgium) L Pimek | 3 | 5

Second round
6 | (Spain) S Casal (Spain) E Sánchez | 5 | 5
WC | (Germany) B Becker (France) G Forget | 7 | 7
(South Africa) L Bale (South Africa) JL de Jager | 4 | 7 | 6
4 | (Sweden) N Kulti (Sweden) M Larsson | 6 | 6 | 1
7 | (United States) T Kronemann (Australia) D Macpherson | 2 | 4
WC | (Italy) A Gaudenzi (Croatia) G Ivanišević | 6 | 6
(Argentina) L Lobo (Spain) J Sánchez | 6 | 3 | 6
2 | (Zimbabwe) B Black (Australia) M Woodforde | 4 | 6 | 3

Quarterfinals
WC | (Germany) B Becker (France) G Forget | 6 | 6
(South Africa) L Bale (South Africa) JL de Jager | 1 | 2
WC | (Italy) A Gaudenzi (Croatia) G Ivanišević | 6 | 2 | 2
(Argentina) L Lobo (Spain) J Sánchez | 4 | 6 | 6

Semifinals
WC | (Germany) B Becker (France) G Forget | 2 | 2
(Argentina) L Lobo (Spain) J Sánchez | 6 | 6

== Qualifying ==
=== Qualifying seeds ===
1. (France) Jean-Philippe Fleurian / (France) Rodolphe Gilbert (qualified)
2. (Czech Republic) Vojtěch Flégl / (Netherlands) Tom Kempers (qualified)
3. (Australia) Jon Ireland / (Belgium) Libor Pimek (qualifying competition, lucky losers)

=== Qualifiers ===
1. (France) Jean-Philippe Fleurian / (France) Rodolphe Gilbert
2. (Czech Republic) Vojtěch Flégl / (Netherlands) Tom Kempers

=== Lucky losers ===
1. (Australia) Jon Ireland / (Belgium) Libor Pimek

=== Qualifying draw ===
==== First qualifier ====
First round
1 | (France) Jean-Philippe Fleurian (France) Rodolphe Gilbert | 6 | 7 | 6
WC | (France) Lionel Roux (France) Fabrice Santoro | 7 | 6 | 2
(South Africa) Clinton Ferreira (North Macedonia) Aleksandar Kitinov | 3 | 4
(Australia) Wayne Arthurs (South Africa) Marius Barnard | 6 | 6

Qualifying competition
1 | (France) Jean-Philippe Fleurian (France) Rodolphe Gilbert | 6 | 6
(Australia) Wayne Arthurs (South Africa) Marius Barnard | 2 | 3

==== Second qualifier ====
First round
2 | (Czech Republic) Vojtěch Flégl (Netherlands) Tom Kempers | 7 | 4 | 7
WC | (Italy) Cristian Brandi (Italy) Renzo Furlan | 6 | 6 | 6
WC | (France) Arnaud Boetsch (Italy) Cristiano Caratti | 6 | 6
3 | (Australia) Jon Ireland (Belgium) Libor Pimek | 7 | 7

Qualifying competition
2 | (Czech Republic) Vojtěch Flégl (Netherlands) Tom Kempers | 6 | 7
3 | (Australia) Jon Ireland (Belgium) Libor Pimek | 3 | 5
