= 1995 Monte Carlo Open =

- Date: 24–30 April
- Edition: 89th
- Category: ATP Championship Series, Single-Week
- Draw: 64S / 32D
- Prize money: $1,545,000
- Surface: Clay / outdoor
- Location: Roquebrune-Cap-Martin, France
- Venue: Monte Carlo Country Club

Champions

Singles
- (Austria) Thomas Muster

Doubles
- (Netherlands) Jacco Eltingh / (Netherlands) Paul Haarhuis
← 1994 ·	Monte Carlo Open	· 1996 →

The 1995 Monte Carlo Open was a men's tennis tournament played on outdoor clay courts and took place at the Monte Carlo Country Club in Roquebrune-Cap-Martin, France, near Monte Carlo, Monaco. The event was part of the ATP Championship Series, Single-Week of the 1995 ATP Tour. It was the 89th edition of the tournament and was held from 24 April through 30 April 1995. Ninth-seeded Thomas Muster won the singles title, his second title at the event after 1992. It was the closest Becker ever got to winning a clay court tournament, as he missed a match point on his own serve with a double-fault in the fourth-set tiebreaker.

== Finals ==
=== Singles ===
(Austria) Thomas Muster defeated (Germany) Boris Becker, 4–6, 5–7, 6–1, 7–6^{(8–6)}, 6–0

- It was Muster's 4th singles title of the year, and 27th of his career.

=== Doubles ===
(Netherlands) Jacco Eltingh / (Netherlands) Paul Haarhuis defeated (Argentina) Luis Lobo / (Spain) Javier Sánchez, 6–3, 6–4
