= 1991 Monte Carlo Open =

- Date: 22–28 April
- Edition: 85th
- Category: ATP Championship Series, Single-Week
- Draw: 56S / 28D
- Prize money: $750,000
- Surface: Clay / outdoor
- Location: Roquebrune-Cap-Martin, France
- Venue: Monte Carlo Country Club

Champions

Singles
- (Spain) Sergi Bruguera

Doubles
- (Spain) Sergio Casal / (Spain) Emilio Sánchez
← 1990 ·	Monte Carlo Open	· 1992 →

The 1991 Monte Carlo Open was a men's tennis tournament played on outdoor clay courts. It was the 85th edition of the Monte Carlo Open, and was part of the ATP Championship Series, Single-Week of the 1991 ATP Tour. It took place at the Monte Carlo Country Club in Roquebrune-Cap-Martin, France, near Monte Carlo, Monaco, from 22 April through 28 April 1991.

The men's singles field was headlined by Stefan Edberg and Boris Becker. Other top seeds in the field were Guy Forget, Andre Agassi, and Goran Ivanišević. Ninth-seeded Sergi Bruguera won the singles title.

== Finals ==
=== Singles ===
(Spain) Sergi Bruguera defeated (Germany) Boris Becker, 5–7, 6–4, 7–6^{(8–6)}, 7–6^{(7–4)}

- It was Bruguera's 2nd singles title of the year and of his career.

=== Doubles ===
(United States) Luke Jensen / (Australia) Laurie Warder defeated (Netherlands) Paul Haarhuis / (Netherlands) Mark Koevermans, 5–7, 7–6, 6–4
