= 1994 Monte Carlo Open =

- Date: 18–24 April
- Edition: 88th
- Category: ATP Championship Series, Single-Week
- Draw: 64S / 32D
- Prize money: $1,470,000
- Surface: Clay / outdoor
- Location: Roquebrune-Cap-Martin, France
- Venue: Monte Carlo Country Club

Champions

Singles
- (Ukraine) Andrei Medvedev

Doubles
- (Sweden) Nicklas Kulti / (Sweden) Magnus Larsson
← 1993 ·	Monte Carlo Open	· 1995 →

The 1994 Monte Carlo Open was a men's tennis tournament played on outdoor clay courts. It was the 88th edition of the Monte Carlo Masters, and was part of the ATP Championship Series, Single-Week of the 1994 ATP Tour. It took place at the Monte Carlo Country Club in Roquebrune-Cap-Martin, France, near Monte Carlo, Monaco, from 18 April through 24 April 1994.

Sixth-seeded Andrei Medvedev won the singles title.

== Finals ==
=== Singles ===
(Ukraine) Andrei Medvedev defeated (Spain) Sergi Bruguera, 7–5, 6–1, 6–3

- It was Medvedev's 1st singles title of the year, and his 7th overall. It was his 1st Masters title.

=== Doubles ===
(Sweden) Nicklas Kulti / (Sweden) Magnus Larsson defeated (Russia) Yevgeny Kafelnikov / (Czech Republic) Daniel Vacek, 3–6, 7–6, 6–4
