= 1995 Monte Carlo Open – Singles =

Singles
- 1995 Monte Carlo Open

Final
- Champion: (Austria) Thomas Muster
- Runner-up: (Germany) Boris Becker
- Score: 4–6, 5–7, 6–1, 7–6^{(8–6)}, 6–0

Details
- Draw: 56 (7Q / 5WC)
- Seeds: 16

Events
Singles	Doubles
← 1994 ·	Monte Carlo Open	· 1996 →

Thomas Muster defeated Boris Becker in the final, 4–6, 5–7, 6–1, 7–6^{(8–6)}, 6–0 to win the singles tennis title at the 1995 Monte-Carlo Masters. Muster saved two championship points and came back from two sets down in the final to win what is regarded as one of the best Monte-Carlo Masters matches in history. Becker was attempting to win his first clay court title, but would never win one.

Andriy Medvedev was the defending champion, but lost in the first round to Richard Fromberg.

== Seeds ==
1. (United States) Pete Sampras (second round, retired)
2. (Germany) Boris Becker (final)
3. (Russia) Yevgeny Kafelnikov (third round)
4. (Croatia) Goran Ivanišević (semifinals)
5. (Spain) Sergi Bruguera (quarterfinals)
6. (Germany) Michael Stich (second round)
7. (Spain) Alberto Berasategui (third round)
8. (Sweden) Magnus Larsson (second round)
9. (Austria) Thomas Muster (champion)
10. (Netherlands) Richard Krajicek (quarterfinals)
11. (Ukraine) Andriy Medvedev (first round)
12. (Sweden) Stefan Edberg (first round)
13. (Switzerland) Marc Rosset (third round)
14. (Italy) Andrea Gaudenzi (semifinals)
15. (Sweden) Thomas Enqvist (second round)
16. (Netherlands) Jacco Eltingh (first round)

== Draw ==
=== Key ===
- Q = Qualifier
- WC = Wild card
- LL = Lucky loser
- Alt = Alternate
- ITF = ITF entry
- PR = Protected ranking
- SR = Special ranking
- SE = Special exempt
- JE = Junior exempt
- JR = Junior Accelerator Programme entrant
- CO = College Accelerator Programme entrant
- NG = Next Gen Accelerator Program entrant
- w/o = Walkover
- r = Retired
- d = Defaulted

=== Finals ===
Semifinals
9	(Austria) Thomas Muster	6	7^{7}
14	(Italy) Andrea Gaudenzi	3	6^{5}
4	(Croatia) Goran Ivanišević	6^{9}	6	1
2	(Germany) Boris Becker	7^{11}	3	6

Final
9	(Austria) Thomas Muster	4	5	6	7^{8}	6
2	(Germany) Boris Becker	6	7	1	6^{6}	0

=== Top half ===
==== Section 1 ====
First round
(Peru) J Yzaga	2	4
(Netherlands) P Haarhuis	6	6
(United States) D Wheaton	6	6
Q	(Ukraine) D Poliakov	4	2
(Czech Republic) K Nováček	1	6	6
16	(Netherlands) J Eltingh	6	4	3
9	(Austria) T Muster	6	6
(France) G Forget	2	2
(Germany) B Karbacher	2	6	6
(Czech Republic) S Doseděl	6	3	0
(France) C Pioline	6	7
(Austria) H Skoff	2	5

Second round
1	(United States) P Sampras	6	1^{r}
(Netherlands) P Haarhuis	4	1
(United States) D Wheaton	6	6
(Czech Republic) K Nováček	3	3
9	(Austria) T Muster	6	6
(Germany) B Karbacher	2	2
(France) C Pioline	2	2
7	(Spain) A Berasategui	6	6

Third round
(Netherlands) P Haarhuis	2	7^{7}	4
(United States) D Wheaton	6	6^{4}	6
9	(Austria) T Muster	7^{8}	6
7	(Spain) A Berasategui	6^{6}	2

Quarterfinals
(United States) D Wheaton	4	4
9	(Austria) T Muster	6	6

==== Section 2 ====
First round
Q	(Romania) A Voinea	5	3
(Australia) M Woodforde	7	6
WC	(France) H Leconte	2	4
Q	(Czech Republic) D Rikl	6	6
(Czech Republic) P Korda	2	2
14	(Italy) A Gaudenzi	6	6
11	(Ukraine) A Medvedev	2	6	4
(Australia) R Fromberg	6	3	6
(Spain) C Costa	6	7
Q	(Czech Republic) D Vacek	1	5
(Australia) P Rafter	1	3
(Spain) J Sánchez	6	6

Second round
3	(Russia) Y Kafelnikov	6	6
(Australia) M Woodforde	2	2
Q	(Czech Republic) D Rikl	2	4
14	(Italy) A Gaudenzi	6	6
(Australia) R Fromberg	6	6
(Spain) C Costa	3	4
(Spain) J Sánchez	6^{7}	6	2
5	(Spain) S Bruguera	7^{9}	0	6

Third round
3	(Russia) Y Kafelnikov	6	5	5
14	(Italy) A Gaudenzi	1	7	7
(Australia) R Fromberg	2	4
5	(Spain) S Bruguera	6	6

Quarterfinals
14	(Italy) A Gaudenzi	7^{7}	6
5	(Spain) S Bruguera	6^{4}	2

=== Bottom half ===
==== Section 3 ====
First round
WC	(Spain) E Sánchez	6	1	3
(Austria) G Schaller	4	6	6
Q	(Spain) J Burillo	4	6	7
(Spain) Á Costa	6	3	5
(France) F Santoro	6	6
12	(Sweden) S Edberg	3	1
13	(Switzerland) M Rosset	4	6	6
WC	(France) G Raoux	6	2	3
(Russia) A Chesnokov	3	1
Q	(Spain) A Portas	6	6
(Spain) F Clavet	6	6
(United States) A Krickstein	2	0

Second round
6	(Germany) M Stich	6^{5}	1
(Austria) G Schaller	7^{7}	6
Q	(Spain) J Burillo	6	3	6^{1}
(France) F Santoro	3	6	7^{7}
13	(Switzerland) M Rosset	6	6
Q	(Spain) A Portas	0	3
(Spain) F Clavet	6	3	4
4	(Croatia) G Ivanišević	3	6	6

Third round
(Austria) G Schaller	6	6
(France) F Santoro	3	1
13	(Switzerland) M Rosset	4	3
4	(Croatia) G Ivanišević	6	6

Quarterfinals
(Austria) G Schaller	6	6^{4}	5
4	(Croatia) G Ivanišević	4	7^{7}	7

==== Section 4 ====
First round
Q	(Spain) Á López Morón	7^{7}	6^{2}	7^{7}
(France) A Boetsch	6^{3}	7^{7}	6^{1}
(Italy) R Furlan	3	6	2
(Netherlands) J Siemerink	6	3	6
WC	(Italy) D Nargiso	3	1
10	(Netherlands) R Krajicek	6	6
15	(Sweden) T Enqvist	2	7	6
WC	(France) T Champion	6	5	4
(Spain) Á Corretja	6	6
(France) O Delaître	1	2
(France) L Roux	3	5
(Sweden) J Björkman	6	7

Second round
8	(Sweden) M Larsson	3	6^{3}
Q	(Spain) Á López Morón	6	7^{7}
(Netherlands) J Siemerink	6	3	4
10	(Netherlands) R Krajicek	3	6	6
15	(Sweden) T Enqvist	4	4
(Spain) Á Corretja	6	6
(Sweden) J Björkman	3	1
2	(Germany) B Becker	6	6

Third round
Q	(Spain) Á López Morón	4	4
10	(Netherlands) R Krajicek	6	6
(Spain) Á Corretja	2	2
2	(Germany) B Becker	6	6

Quarterfinals
10	(Netherlands) R Krajicek	2	5
2	(Germany) B Becker	6	7

== Qualifying ==
=== Qualifying seeds ===
1. (Czech Republic) Daniel Vacek (qualified)
2. (Russia) Andrei Olhovskiy (second round)
3. (Chile) Marcelo Ríos (second round)
4. (Uruguay) Marcelo Filippini (first round)
5. (Spain) Óscar Martínez (first round, retired)
6. (Spain) Tomás Carbonell (first round)
7. (Zimbabwe) Byron Black (first round)
8. (Germany) Marc-Kevin Goellner (qualifying competition)
9. (n/a)
10. (Italy) Cristiano Caratti (first round)
11. (Portugal) Nuno Marques (first round)
12. (Czech Republic) David Rikl (qualified)
13. (Netherlands) Sjeng Schalken (second round)
14. (Hungary) Sándor Noszály (first round)

=== Qualifiers ===
1. (Czech Republic) Daniel Vacek
2. (Czech Republic) David Rikl
3. (Romania) Adrian Voinea
4. (Spain) Álex López Morón
5. (Ukraine) Dimitri Poliakov
6. (Spain) Jordi Burillo
7. (Spain) Albert Portas

=== Qualifying draw ===
==== First qualifier ====
First round
1	(Czech Republic) Daniel Vacek	4	6	6
(Germany) Thomas Gollwitzer	6	3	1
(Belgium) Kris Goossens	5	3
(Spain) Roberto Carretero	7	6
(Sweden) Jonas Svensson	1	2
(Haiti) Ronald Agénor	6	6
(France) Stéphane Simian	1	2
13	(Netherlands) Sjeng Schalken	6	6

Second round
1	(Czech Republic) Daniel Vacek	6	6
(Spain) Roberto Carretero	2	1
(Haiti) Ronald Agénor	6	7	6
13	(Netherlands) Sjeng Schalken	7	6	4

Qualifying competition
1	(Czech Republic) Daniel Vacek	6	6	6
(Haiti) Ronald Agénor	4	7	3

==== Second qualifier ====
First round
2	(Russia) Andrei Olhovskiy	1	7	7
(France) Jean-Philippe Fleurian	6	5	6
(Spain) Emilio Benfele Álvarez	6	6
(France) Frédéric Vitoux	3	4
WC	(Monaco) Sébastien Graeff	0	7	4
WC	(Iran) Mansour Bahrami	6	5	6
(Sweden) Henrik Holm	2	1
12	(Czech Republic) David Rikl	6	6

Second round
2	(Russia) Andrei Olhovskiy	4	4
(Spain) Emilio Benfele Álvarez	6	6
WC	(Iran) Mansour Bahrami	2	4
12	(Czech Republic) David Rikl	6	6

Qualifying competition
(Spain) Emilio Benfele Álvarez	6	7	1
12	(Czech Republic) David Rikl	7	6	6

==== Third qualifier ====
First round
3	(Chile) Marcelo Ríos	6	6	6
(France) Thierry Guardiola	3	7	4
(Italy) Davide Sanguinetti	2	2
(Morocco) Younes El Aynaoui	6	6
(Czech Republic) Václav Roubíček	4	6	6
(Romania) Adrian Voinea	6	4	7
(Argentina) Martín Rodríguez	6	3	6
14	(Hungary) Sandor Noszaly	4	6	3

Second round
3	(Chile) Marcelo Ríos	5	2
(Morocco) Younes El Aynaoui	7	6
(Romania) Adrian Voinea	6	6
(Argentina) Martín Rodríguez	0	0

Qualifying competition
(Morocco) Younes El Aynaoui	1	2
(Romania) Adrian Voinea	6	6

==== Fourth qualifier ====
First round
4	(Uruguay) Marcelo Filippini	3	7	3
(Sweden) Nicklas Kulti	6	5	6
WC	(Monaco) Christophe Bosio	1	2
(Spain) Álex López Morón	6	6
(France) Frédéric Fontang	7	6
(Italy) Pietro Pennisi	6	3
(France) Gérard Solvès	7	6
10	(Italy) Cristiano Caratti	6	1

Second round
(Sweden) Nicklas Kulti	7	3	6
(Spain) Álex López Morón	5	6	7
(France) Frédéric Fontang	6	6
(France) Gérard Solvès	1	1

Qualifying competition
(Spain) Álex López Morón	6	6
(France) Frédéric Fontang	2	2

==== Fifth qualifier ====
First round
5	(Spain) Óscar Martínez	1^{r}
(Spain) Juan Gisbert Schultze	5
(France) Rodolphe Gilbert	6	6
WC	(Monaco) Nicolas Klingelschmitt	2	3
WC	(Monaco) Christophe Boggetti	0	0
WC	(Russia) Andrei Cherkasov	6	6
(Ukraine) Dimitri Poliakov	7	6
11	(Portugal) Nuno Marques	5	2

Second round
(Spain) Juan Gisbert Schultze	3	3
(France) Rodolphe Gilbert	6	6
WC	(Russia) Andrei Cherkasov	4	5
(Ukraine) Dimitri Poliakov	6	7

Qualifying competition
(France) Rodolphe Gilbert	1	2
(Ukraine) Dimitri Poliakov	6	6

==== Sixth qualifier ====
First round
6	(Spain) Tomás Carbonell	0	4
(Spain) Jordi Burillo	6	6
(Czech Republic) David Škoch	3	5
(South Africa) David Nainkin	6	7
(Germany) Arne Thoms	3	6	6
(Germany) Lars Burgsmüller	6	3	4
(Spain) Juan Albert Viloca	3	2
Alt	(Ecuador) Luis Morejón	6	6

Second round
(Spain) Jordi Burillo	6	6
(South Africa) David Nainkin	0	0
(Germany) Arne Thoms	1	5
Alt	(Ecuador) Luis Morejón	6	7

Qualifying competition
(Spain) Jordi Burillo	7	6
Alt	(Ecuador) Luis Morejón	5	4

==== Seventh qualifier ====
First round
7	(Zimbabwe) Byron Black	2	2
(Spain) Albert Portas	6	6
(France) Jérôme Golmard	2	4
(Germany) Dirk Dier	6	6
(Sweden) Mikael Tillström	6	6
(Spain) Félix Mantilla	3	4
(Morocco) Hicham Arazi	6	6	5
8	(Germany) Marc-Kevin Goellner	7	3	7

Second round
(Spain) Albert Portas	5	6	6
(Germany) Dirk Dier	7	1	4
(Sweden) Mikael Tillström	6	1	6
8	(Germany) Marc-Kevin Goellner	1	6	7

Qualifying competition
(Spain) Albert Portas	6	5	6
8	(Germany) Marc-Kevin Goellner	2	7	1
