= 1994 Monte Carlo Open – Singles =

Singles
- 1994 Monte Carlo Open

Final
- Champions: (Ukraine) Andriy Medvedev
- Runners-up: (Spain) Sergi Bruguera
- Score: 7–5, 6–1, 6–3

Details
- Draw: 64 (8Q / 3WC)
- Seeds: 16

Events
Singles	Doubles
← 1993 ·	Monte Carlo Open	· 1995 →

Andriy Medvedev defeated the defending champion Sergi Bruguera in the final, 7–5, 6–1, 6–3 to win the singles tennis title at the 1994 Monte Carlo Open.

== Seeds ==
1. (Germany) Michael Stich (third round)
2. (Sweden) Stefan Edberg (semifinals)
3. (United States) Jim Courier (quarterfinals)
4. (Croatia) Goran Ivanišević (quarterfinals)
5. (Spain) Sergi Bruguera (final)
6. (Ukraine) Andriy Medvedev (champion)
7. (France) Cédric Pioline (first round)
8. (Sweden) Magnus Gustafsson (third round)
9. (Austria) Thomas Muster (quarterfinals)
10. (Czech Republic) Petr Korda (first round)
11. (Spain) Carlos Costa (second round)
12. (Switzerland) Marc Rosset (first round)
13. (France) Arnaud Boetsch (first round)
14. (Netherlands) Richard Krajicek (second round)
15. (United States) Andre Agassi (first round)
16. (South Africa) Wayne Ferreira (second round)

== Draw ==
=== Key ===
- Q = Qualifier
- WC = Wild card
- LL = Lucky loser
- Alt = Alternate
- SE = Special exempt
- PR = Protected ranking
- ITF = ITF entry
- JE = Junior exempt
- w/o = Walkover
- r = Retired
- d = Defaulted
- SR = Special ranking
- NB: The Final was the best of 5 sets.

=== Finals ===
Semifinals
(Russia) Yevgeny Kafelnikov	6^{6}	3
6	(Ukraine) Andriy Medvedev	7^{8}	6
5	(Spain) Sergi Bruguera	6	7^{7}
2	(Sweden) Stefan Edberg	2	6^{3}

Final
6	(Ukraine) Andriy Medvedev	7	6	6
5	(Spain) Sergi Bruguera	5	1	3

=== Top half ===
==== Section 1 ====
First round
1	(Germany) M Stich	6	7
WC	(France) G Forget	2	5
(Spain) J Burillo	6	6
(Australia) R Fromberg	1	1
WC	(Germany) C-U Steeb	6	3	3
(Austria) G Schaller	2	6	6
(Russia) Y Kafelnikov	1	6	6
15	(United States) A Agassi	6	3	4
10	(Czech Republic) P Korda	6	7
(Czech Republic) K Nováček	4	5
(Austria) H Skoff	4	6	6
Q	(United States) F Montana	6	3	4
(Russia) A Chesnokov	6	6
Q	(Morocco) K Alami	3	2
(Czech Republic) D Rikl	6	1	6
7	(France) C Pioline	4	6	3

Second round
1	(Germany) M Stich	6	6
(Australia) J Burillo	3	3
(Austria) G Schaller	3	3
(Russia) Y Kafelnikov	6	6
10	(Czech Republic) P Korda	3	1
(Austria) H Skoff	6	6
(Russia) A Chesnokov	6^{2}	4
(Czech Republic) D Rikl	7^{7}	6

Third round
1	(Germany) M Stich	6^{3}	4
(Russia) Y Kafelnikov	7^{7}	6
(Austria) H Skoff	6	2	3
(Czech Republic) D Rikl	3	6	6

Quarterfinals
(Russia) Y Kafelnikov	7^{7}	6
(Czech Republic) D Rikl	6^{1}	3

==== Section 2 ====
First round
3	(United States) J Courier	6	6
(Morocco) Y El Aynaoui	0	3
(Spain) J Arrese	6	6
Q	(Spain) R Carretero	4	0
(Italy) A Gaudenzi	6	6
Q	(France) O Delaître	4	1
(Sweden) H Holm	1	4
14	(Netherlands) R Krajicek	6	6
12	(Switzerland) M Rosset	2	3
(Czech Republic) S Doseděl	6	6
(Italy) R Furlan	1	2
(Netherlands) P Haarhuis	6	6
(Germany) B Karbacher	6	4	6
Q	(Germany) O Gross	3	6	4
(Sweden) M Larsson	2	5
6	(Ukraine) A Medvedev	6	7

Second round
3	(United States) J Courier	6	6
(Spain) J Arrese	0	4
(Italy) A Gaudenzi	6^{3}	7^{7}	6
14	(Netherlands) R Krajicek	7^{7}	6^{3}	3
(Czech Republic) S Doseděl	6	6
(Netherlands) P Haarhuis	2	0
(Germany) B Karbacher	2	6	5
6	(Ukraine) A Medvedev	6	4	7

Third round
3	(United States) J Courier	6	6
(Italy) A Gaudenzi	3	4
(Czech Republic) S Doseděl	4	3
6	(Ukraine) A Medvedev	6	6

Quarterfinals
3	(United States) J Courier	7^{7}	5	6^{3}
6	(Ukraine) A Medvedev	6^{5}	7	7^{7}

=== Bottom half ===
==== Section 3 ====
First round
5	(Spain) S Bruguera	6	6
LL	(Sweden) L Jonsson	0	1
(Spain) J Sánchez	7	6
(Czech Republic) D Vacek	5	2
(Spain) A Berasategui	6	6
(France) R Gilbert	2	0
(Sweden) N Kulti	3	6	3
11	(Spain) C Costa	6	4	6
13	(France) A Boetsch	3	7^{7}	2
(Peru) J Yzaga	6	6^{3}	6
(Sweden) J Svensson	4	6^{3}
(Australia) M Woodforde	6	7^{7}
(South Africa) M Ondruska	5	7	4
(Czech Republic) M Damm	7	5	6
(Haiti) R Agénor	4	7^{7}	5
4	(Croatia) G Ivanišević	6	6^{0}	7

Second round
5	(Spain) S Bruguera	6	6
(Spain) J Sánchez	1	3
(Spain) A Berasategui	7^{7}	6
11	(Spain) C Costa	6^{5}	4
(Peru) J Yzaga	6	4	6
(Australia) M Woodforde	3	6	3
(Czech Republic) M Damm	2	2
4	(Croatia) G Ivanišević	6	6

Third round
5	(Spain) S Bruguera	6^{8}	6	6
(Spain) A Berasategui	7^{10}	0	0
(Peru) J Yzaga	1	3
4	(Croatia) G Ivanišević	6	6

Quarterfinals
5	(Spain) S Bruguera	6	6
4	(Croatia) G Ivanišević	0	3

==== Section 4 ====
First round
8	(Sweden) M Gustafsson	6	6
(France) H Leconte	3	1
(Italy) S Pescosolido	6	6
(Austria) A Antonitsch	3	2
(Germany) K Braasch	6^{1}	3
WC	(France) G Solvès	7^{7}	6
Q	(Sweden) J Apell	6^{7}	2
9	(Austria) T Muster	7^{9}	6
16	(South Africa) W Ferreira	3	6	6
(Spain) E Sánchez	6	3	3
(Spain) Á Corretja	6	7
(Argentina) A Mancini	4	5
(Russia) A Cherkasov	0	6	5
Q	(Spain) Á Costa	6	4	7
Q	(Germany) T Gollwitzer	4	4
2	(Sweden) S Edberg	6	6

Second round
8	(Sweden) M Gustafsson	7	6
(Italy) S Pescosolido	5	1
WC	(France) G Solvès	4	0
9	(Austria) T Muster	6	6
16	(South Africa) W Ferreira	3	4
(Spain) Á Corretja	6	6
Q	(Spain) Á Costa	1	2
2	(Sweden) S Edberg	6	6

Third round
8	(Sweden) M Gustafsson	2	4
9	(Austria) T Muster	6	6
(Spain) Á Corretja	1	5
2	(Sweden) S Edberg	6	7

Quarterfinals
9	(Austria) T Muster	7^{10}	6^{2}	4
2	(Sweden) S Edberg	6^{8}	7^{7}	6
