= 1996 Monte Carlo Open – Singles =

Singles
- 1996 Monte Carlo Open

Final
- Champion: (Austria) Thomas Muster
- Runner-up: (Spain) Albert Costa
- Score: 6–3, 5–7, 4–6, 6–3, 6–2

Details
- Draw: 56 (7Q / 5WC)
- Seeds: 16

Events
Singles	Doubles
← 1995 ·	Monte Carlo Open	· 1997 →

Defending champion Thomas Muster defeated Albert Costa in the final, 6–3, 5–7, 4–6, 6–3, 6–2 to win the singles tennis title at the 1996 Monte Carlo Open.

== Seeds ==
The top eight seeds received a bye to the second round.

1. (Austria) Thomas Muster (champion)
2. (United States) Andre Agassi (third round)
3. (United States) Michael Chang (second round)
4. (Germany) Boris Becker (third round)
5. (Croatia) Goran Ivanišević (second round)
6. (Russia) Yevgeny Kafelnikov (second round)
7. (Sweden) Thomas Enqvist (second round)
8. (United States) Jim Courier (second round)
9. (Spain) Sergi Bruguera (second round)
10. (Switzerland) Marc Rosset (first round)
11. (France) Arnaud Boetsch (second round)
12. (Ukraine) Andriy Medvedev (third round)
13. (Chile) Marcelo Ríos (semifinals)
14. (United States) Todd Martin (first round)
15. (Italy) Renzo Furlan (second round, withdrew)
16. (Spain) Albert Costa (finalist)

== Draw ==
=== Key ===
- Q = Qualifier
- WC = Wild card
- LL = Lucky loser
- Alt = Alternate
- ITF = ITF entry
- PR = Protected ranking
- SR = Special ranking
- SE = Special exempt
- JE = Junior exempt
- JR = Junior Accelerator Programme entrant
- CO = College Accelerator Programme entrant
- NG = Next Gen Accelerator Program entrant
- w/o = Walkover
- r = Retired
- d = Defaulted

=== Finals ===
Semifinals
1	(Austria) Thomas Muster	6	6
(France) Cédric Pioline	3	3
13	(Chile) Marcelo Ríos	3	6	3
16	(Spain) Albert Costa	6	4	6

Final
1	(Austria) Thomas Muster	6	5	4	6	6
16	(Spain) Albert Costa	3	7	6	3	2

=== Top half ===
==== Section 1 ====
First round
(Spain) T Carbonell	6	3	6
(Belgium) F Dewulf	0	6	1
Q	(Italy) O Camporese	6	3	2
(Spain) C Moyá	2	6	6
(Czech Republic) D Vacek	4	6^{3}
15	(Italy) R Furlan	6	7^{7}
10	(Switzerland) M Rosset	5	2
(Netherlands) R Krajicek	7	6
(Sweden) S Edberg	7^{8}	6
(Spain) À Corretja	6^{6}	3
Q	(Sweden) P Fredriksson	3	5
(Netherlands) S Schalken	6	7

Second round
1	(Austria) T Muster	7	6
(Spain) T Carbonell	5	4
(Spain) C Moyá	w/o
15	(Italy) R Furlan
(Netherlands) R Krajicek	0	6	6
(Sweden) S Edberg	6	4	2
(Netherlands) S Schalken	3	6	6
7	(Sweden) T Enqvist	6	3	3

Third round
1	(Austria) T Muster	6	7^{7}
(Spain) C Moyá	2	6^{3}
(Netherlands) R Krajicek	5	7^{7}	4
(Netherlands) S Schalken	7	6^{5}	6

Quarterfinals
1	(Austria) T Muster	5	6	6
(Netherlands) S Schalken	7	1	4

==== Section 2 ====
First round
Q	(Russia) A Cherkasov	2	1
(Spain) C Costa	6	6
(Sweden) M Larsson	4	2
(Czech Republic) B Ulihrach	6	6
(Czech Republic) P Korda	6	6
14	(United States) T Martin	4	3
12	(Ukraine) A Medvedev	6	6
(Spain) A Berasategui	4	4
(Australia) M Philippoussis	2	7^{7}	7^{7}
(Austria) G Schaller	6	6^{5}	6^{2}
(Germany) H Dreekmann	3	3
(France) C Pioline	6	6

Second round
3	(United States) M Chang	7^{10}	2	4
(Spain) C Costa	6^{8}	6	6
(Czech Republic) B Ulihrach	1	2
(Czech Republic) P Korda	6	6
12	(Ukraine) A Medvedev	6	6
(Australia) M Philippoussis	0	2
(France) C Pioline	6	6
6	(Russia) Y Kafelnikov	4	3

Third round
(Spain) C Costa	6	6
(Czech Republic) P Korda	4	1
12	(Ukraine) A Medvedev	6	0	2
(France) C Pioline	4	6	6

Quarterfinals
(Spain) C Costa	2	3
(France) C Pioline	6	6

=== Bottom half ===
==== Section 3 ====
First round
Q	(Spain) O Martinez	4	2
WC	(Sweden) M Gustafsson	6	6
WC	(Spain) E Sánchez	6^{2}	3
WC	(France) F Santoro	7^{7}	6
Q	(Germany) M-K Goellner	2	4
11	(France) A Boetsch	6	6
13	(Chile) M Ríos	6	5	6
(Spain) F Clavet	4	7	4
(Sweden) J Björkman	6	5	3
(Czech Republic) J Novák	2	7	6
Q	(Czech Republic) D Rikl	6	6^{6}	6
WC	(France) H Leconte	2	7^{8}	1

Second round
5	(Croatia) G Ivanišević	2	2
WC	(Sweden) M Gustafsson	6	6
WC	(France) F Santoro	7	1	7^{7}
11	(France) A Boetsch	5	6	6^{3}
13	(Chile) M Ríos	6	2	6
(Czech Republic) J Novák	3	6	2
Q	(Czech Republic) D Rikl	4	6	3
4	(Germany) B Becker	6	4	6

Third round
WC	(Sweden) M Gustafsson	7^{7}	6
WC	(France) F Santoro	6^{3}	1
13	(Chile) M Ríos	6	6
4	(Germany) B Becker	4	3

Quarterfinals
WC	(Sweden) M Gustafsson	3	4
13	(Chile) M Ríos	6	6

==== Section 4 ====
First round
(Spain) J Sánchez	6	6
(Netherlands) P Haarhuis	2	3
WC	(Italy) D Nargiso	6	0	2
Q	(Spain) F Mantilla	3	6	6
(Italy) A Gaudenzi	2	6^{3}
9	(Spain) S Bruguera	6	7^{7}
16	(Spain) A Costa	6	6
(Spain) J Arrese	2	0
(Argentina) H Gumy	6	6
(Spain) J Burillo	3	3
(Germany) B Karbacher	3	2
(Netherlands) J Siemerink	6	6

Second round
8	(United States) J Courier	3	3
(Spain) J Sánchez	6	6
Q	(Spain) F Mantilla	7	6
9	(Spain) S Bruguera	5	2
16	(Spain) A Costa	6^{3}	6	6
(Argentina) H Gumy	7^{7}	1	4
(Netherlands) J Siemerink	2	3
2	(United States) A Agassi	6	6

Third round
(Spain) J Sánchez	6	6^{8}	4
Q	(Spain) F Mantilla	3	7^{10}	6
16	(Spain) A Costa	6	6
2	(United States) A Agassi	2	1

Quarterfinals
Q	(Spain) F Mantilla	3	3
16	(Spain) A Costa	6	6
