= 1991 Monte Carlo Open – Doubles =

Doubles
- 1991 Monte Carlo Open

Final
- Champions: (United States) Luke Jensen; (Australia) Laurie Warder
- Runners-up: (Netherlands) Paul Haarhuis; (Netherlands) Mark Koevermans
- Score: 5–7, 7–6^{(7–3)}, 6–4

Details
- Draw: 28 (2Q)
- Seeds: 8

Events
| Singles | Doubles |
- Monte Carlo Open

Tomáš Šmíd and Petr Korda were the defending champions, but Korda chose not to participate. Šmid partnered Karel Nováček, but lost in the first round to Ronnie Båthman and Rikard Bergh.

Luke Jensen and Laurie Warder won the title, defeating Paul Haarhuis and Mark Koevermans in the final, 5–7, 7–6^{(7–3)}, 6–4.

== Seeds ==
The top four seeded teams received byes into the second round.

1. (Spain) Sergio Casal / (Spain) Emilio Sánchez (semifinals)
2. (South Africa) Pieter Aldrich / (South Africa) Danie Visser (second round)
3. (United States) Patrick Galbraith / (United States) Todd Witsken (semifinals)
4. (Netherlands) Paul Haarhuis / (Netherlands) Mark Koevermans (finals)
5. (Italy) Omar Camporese / (Croatia) Goran Ivanišević (first round)
6. (Australia) Broderick Dyke / (Sweden) Peter Lundgren (second round)
7. (United Kingdom) Jeremy Bates / (United Kingdom) Nick Brown (quarterfinals)
8. (Ecuador) Andrés Gómez / (Spain) Javier Sánchez (quarterfinals)

== Draw ==
Key

- Q = Qualifier
- WC = Wild card
- LL = Lucky loser
- Alt = Alternate
- ITF = ITF entry
- PR = Protected ranking
- SR = Special ranking
- SE = Special exempt
- JE = Junior exempt
- JR = Junior Accelerator Programme entrant
- CO = College Accelerator Programme entrant
- NG = Next Gen Accelerator Program entrant
- w/o = Walkover
- r = Retired
- d = Defaulted

=== Finals ===
Semifinals

Final

1
- (Spain) Sergio Casal
- (Spain) Emilio Sánchez
6
1
6

4
- (Netherlands) Paul Haarhuis
- (Netherlands) Mark Koevermans
1
6
7

4
- (Netherlands) Paul Haarhuis
- (Netherlands) Mark Koevermans
7
6^{3}
4

- (United States) Luke Jensen
- (Australia) Laurie Warder
5
7^{7}
6

3
- (United States) Patrick Galbraith
- (United States) Todd Witsken
4
1

- (United States) Luke Jensen
- (Australia) Laurie Warder
6
6

=== Top half ===
First round

Second round

Quarterfinals

Semifinals

1
- (Spain) S Casal
- (Spain) E Sánchez
6
6

- (Iran) M Bahrami
- (Australia) M Woodforde
7
3
7

- (Iran) M Bahrami
- (Australia) M Woodforde
3
3

- (Belgium) L Pimek
- (Netherlands) M Schapers
5
6
6

1
- (Spain) S Casal
- (Spain) E Sánchez
6
6

- (Sweden) P Henricsson
- (Sweden) N Utgren
6
3
6

7
- (United Kingdom) J Bates
- (United Kingdom) N Brown
1
3

- (Sweden) M Gustafsson
- (Sweden) J Svensson
3
6
7

- (Sweden) M Gustafsson
- (Sweden) J Svensson
2
4

- (Netherlands) T Nijssen
- (Czechoslovakia) C Suk
5
4

7
- (United Kingdom) J Bates
- (United Kingdom) N Brown
6
6

7
- (United Kingdom) J Bates
- (United Kingdom) N Brown
7
6

1
- (Spain) S Casal
- (Spain) E Sánchez
6
4
6

4
- (Netherlands) P Haarhuis
- (Netherlands) M Koevermans
1
6
7

4
- (Netherlands) P Haarhuis
- (Netherlands) M Koevermans
4
7
7

- (Argentina) G Luza
- (Brazil) L Mattar
3
3

- (Germany) B Becker
- (Brazil) C Motta
6
6
5

- (Germany) B Becker
- (Brazil) C Motta
6
6

4
- (Netherlands) P Haarhuis
- (Netherlands) M Koevermans
6
6

- (Germany) E Jelen
- (Germany) U Riglewski
6
5
6

6
- (Sweden) J Gunnarsson
- (Sweden) M Wilander
4
3

- (Sweden) J Gunnarsson
- (Sweden) M Wilander
4
7
7

- (Sweden) J Gunnarsson
- (Sweden) M Wilander
6
6

- (United States) S DeVries
- (Australia) D Macpherson
5
6
2

6
- (Australia) B Dyke
- (Sweden) P Lundgren
2
2

6
- (Australia) B Dyke
- (Sweden) P Lundgren
7
3
6

=== Bottom half ===
First round

Second round

Quarterfinals

Semifinals

5
- (Italy) O Camporese
- (Croatia) G Ivanišević
2
7
5

Q
- (Czechoslovakia) V Flegl
- (Croatia) G Prpić
6
6
7

Q
- (Czechoslovakia) V Flegl
- (Croatia) G Prpić
7
6

Q
- (Slovakia) B Stankovič
- (Czechoslovakia) R Vogel
4
6
2

- (Mexico) L Lavalle
- (Mexico) J Lozano
6
4

- (Mexico) L Lavalle
- (Mexico) J Lozano
6
3
6

Q
- (Czechoslovakia) V Flegl
- (Croatia) G Prpić
4
3

- (Sweden) R Båthman
- (Sweden) R Bergh
4
6
6

3
- (United States) P Galbraith
- (United States) T Witsken
6
6

- (Czechoslovakia) K Nováček
- (Czechoslovakia) T Šmíd
6
4
3

- (Sweden) R Båthman
- (Sweden) R Bergh
4
2

3
- (United States) P Galbraith
- (United States) T Witsken
6
6

3
- (United States) P Galbraith
- (United States) T Witsken
4
1

8
- (Ecuador) Gómez
- (Spain) J Sánchez
7
3
6

- (United States) L Jensen
- (Australia) L Warder
6
6

- (United States) C Beckman
- (United States) S Cannon
5
6
2

8
- (Ecuador) Gómez
- (Spain) J Sánchez
6
6

- (United States) J Brown
- (Sweden) T Svantesson
2
6
3

- (United States) A Agassi
- (Austria) T Muster
4
3

- (United States) A Agassi
- (Austria) T Muster
6
4
6

8
- (Ecuador) Gómez
- (Spain) J Sánchez
6
6
0

- (United States) L Jensen
- (Australia) L Warder
6
6

- (United States) L Jensen
- (Australia) L Warder
1
7
6

- (Argentina) H de la Peña
- (Italy) D Nargiso
3
2

- (United States) L Jensen
- (Australia) L Warder
5
6
6

2
- (South Africa) P Aldrich
- (South Africa) D Visser
7
3
3
