= 1996 Monte Carlo Open – Doubles =

Doubles
- 1996 Monte Carlo Open

Final
- Champions: (South Africa) Ellis Ferreira (Netherlands) Jan Siemerink
- Runners-up: (Sweden) Jonas Björkman (Sweden) Nicklas Kulti
- Score: 2–6, 6–3, 6–2

Details
- Draw: 28
- Seeds: 8

Events
Singles	Doubles
← 1995 ·	Monte Carlo Open	· 1997 →

Jacco Eltingh and Paul Haarhuis were the defending champions but only Haarhuis competed that year with Sjeng Schalken.

Haarhuis and Schalken lost in the quarterfinals to Grant Connell and Todd Martin.

Ellis Ferreira and Jan Siemerink won in the final 2–6, 6–3, 6–2 against Jonas Björkman and Nicklas Kulti.

== Seeds ==
The top four seeded teams received byes into the second round.

1. (Russia) Yevgeny Kafelnikov / (Russia) Andrei Olhovskiy (quarterfinals)
2. (Sweden) Jonas Björkman / (Sweden) Nicklas Kulti (final)
3. (Canada) Grant Connell / (United States) Todd Martin (semifinals)
4. (South Africa) Ellis Ferreira / (Netherlands) Jan Siemerink (champions)
5. (Netherlands) Menno Oosting / (Czech Republic) Cyril Suk (first round)
6. (Sweden) Stefan Edberg / (Czech Republic) Petr Korda (first round)
7. (Argentina) Luis Lobo / (Spain) Javier Sánchez (semifinals)
8. (Czech Republic) Jiří Novák / (Czech Republic) David Rikl (second round)

== Draw ==
=== Key ===
- Q = Qualifier
- WC = Wild card
- LL = Lucky loser
- Alt = Alternate
- SE = Special exempt
- PR = Protected ranking
- ITF = ITF entry
- JE = Junior exempt
- w/o = Walkover
- r = Retired
- d = Defaulted
- SR = Special ranking

=== Finals ===
Semifinals

Final

7
- (Argentina) Luis Lobo
- (Spain) Javier Sánchez
3
2

4
- (South Africa) Ellis Ferreira
- (Netherlands) Jan Siemerink
6
6

4
- (South Africa) Ellis Ferreira
- (Netherlands) Jan Siemerink
2
6
6

2
- (Sweden) Jonas Björkman
- (Sweden) Nicklas Kulti
6
3
2

3
- (Canada) Grant Connell
- (United States) Todd Martin
4
6
3

2
- (Sweden) Jonas Björkman
- (Sweden) Nicklas Kulti
6
1
6

=== Top half ===
First round

Second round

Quarterfinals

Semifinals

1
- (Russia) Y Kafelnikov
- (Russia) A Olhovskiy
7
7

- (United Kingdom) N Broad
- (South Africa) P Norval
6
1
7

- (United Kingdom) N Broad
- (South Africa) P Norval
5
6

- (South Africa) J-L de Jager
- (France) O Delaître
3
6
6

1
- (Russia) Y Kafelnikov
- (Russia) A Olhovskiy
4
5

- (Italy) A Gaudenzi
- (Croatia) G Ivanišević
3
6
6

7
- (Argentina) L Lobo
- (Spain) J Sánchez
6
7

WC
- (France) H Leconte
- (Ukraine) A Medvedev
6
3
2

- (Italy) A Gaudenzi
- (Croatia) G Ivanišević
6
3
6

- (Netherlands) T Nijssen
- (United States) G Van Emburgh
3
0

7
- (Argentina) L Lobo
- (Spain) J Sánchez
4
6
7

7
- (Argentina) L Lobo
- (Spain) J Sánchez
6
6

7
- (Argentina) L Lobo
- (Spain) J Sánchez
3
2

4
- (South Africa) E Ferreira
- (Netherlands) J Siemerink
6
6

4
- (South Africa) E Ferreira
- (Netherlands) J Siemerink
6
6

WC
- (Italy) O Camporese
- (Italy) D Nargiso
5
6

- (Netherlands) H J Davids
- (Germany) M-K Goellner
1
3

- (Netherlands) H J Davids
- (Germany) M-K Goellner
7
7

4
- (South Africa) E Ferreira
- (Netherlands) J Siemerink
7
7

WC
- (Italy) R Furlan
- (Spain) E Sánchez

- (Belgium) L Pimek
- (South Africa) B Talbot
6
5

Q
- (Spain) F Clavet
- (Italy) F Maggi
w/o

Q
- (Spain) F Clavet
- (Italy) F Maggi
4
1

- (Belgium) L Pimek
- (South Africa) B Talbot
6
2
6

- (Belgium) L Pimek
- (South Africa) B Talbot
6
6

5
- (Netherlands) M Oosting
- (Czech Republic) C Suk
2
6
2

=== Bottom half ===
First round

Second round

Quarterfinals

Semifinals

6
- (Sweden) S Edberg
- (Czech Republic) P Korda
4
2

- (Netherlands) P Haarhuis
- (Netherlands) S Schalken
6
6

- (Netherlands) P Haarhuis
- (Netherlands) S Schalken
6
7

- (Germany) B Becker
- (Australia) M Philippoussis
3
6
7

- (Germany) B Becker
- (Australia) M Philippoussis
4
6

- (Australia) J Eagle
- (Australia) A Florent
6
3
6

- (Netherlands) P Haarhuis
- (Netherlands) S Schalken
2
7
2

- (United States) M Keil
- (Sweden) P Nyborg
3
4

3
- (Canada) G Connell
- (United States) T Martin
6
6
6

Q
- (Czech Republic) V Flégl
- (Slovakia) K Kučera
6
6

Q
- (Czech Republic) V Flégl
- (Slovakia) K Kučera
1
2

3
- (Canada) G Connell
- (United States) T Martin
6
6

3
- (Canada) G Connell
- (United States) T Martin
4
6
3

8
- (Czech Republic) J Novák
- (Czech Republic) D Rikl
6
6

2
- (Sweden) J Björkman
- (Sweden) N Kulti
6
1
6

- (Netherlands) R Krajicek
- (Czech Republic) D Vacek
2
3

8
- (Czech Republic) J Novák
- (Czech Republic) D Rikl
3
6

- (United States) T Kronemann
- (Australia) D Macpherson
6
6
6

- (United States) T Kronemann
- (Australia) D Macpherson
6
7

WC
- (France) A Boetsch
- (Switzerland) M Rosset
1
7
1

- (United States) T Kronemann
- (Australia) D Macpherson
1
7
5

- (South Africa) D Adams
- (South Africa) M Barnard
6
3
2

2
- (Sweden) J Björkman
- (Sweden) N Kulti
6
5
7

- (Spain) J A Conde
- (Spain) À Corretja
0
6
6

- (Spain) J A Conde
- (Spain) À Corretja
6
1

2
- (Sweden) J Björkman
- (Sweden) N Kulti
7
6
