= Oleksandr Dolgopolov Sr. =

Soviet-Ukrainian tennis player

Oleksandr Dolhopolov Sr.
- Country (sports): Soviet Union; Ukraine
- Born: 10 July 1964 (age 62)
- Plays: Right-handed
- Prize money: $5,732

Singles
- Career record: 1–1
- Career titles: 0
- Highest ranking: No. 504 (28 July 1986)

Doubles
- Career record: 0–4
- Career titles: 0
- Highest ranking: No. 463 (18 March 1985)

Oleksandr Dolhopolov Sr. (born 10 July 1964) is a former professional tennis player from Ukraine who competed for the Soviet Union.

He is the father of Alexandr Dolgopolov (born Oleksandr Dolhopolov Jr.), who was a quarter-finalist at the 2011 Australian Open.

== Career ==
Dolhopolov was runner-up to Andrei Chesnokov at the 1986 Soviet Championships.

In 1987 he played two singles rubbers for the Soviet Union Davis Cup team, against Turkey. He lost his first match, to Necvet Demir in five sets, but defeated Kaya Saydas in his other rubber.

Dolhopolov also played Davis Cup tennis for his native Ukraine, in a 1993 tie against Djibouti, which took place in Malta. He appeared in the doubles rubber, with Andrei Medvedev.

He would be the coach of Medvedev from the mid-1980s and into the 1990s. During this time he also partnered Medvedev in four ATP Tour doubles tournaments, including the 1993 Monte Carlo Open.
