= Alexandr Dolgopolov =

Ukrainian tennis player (born 1988)

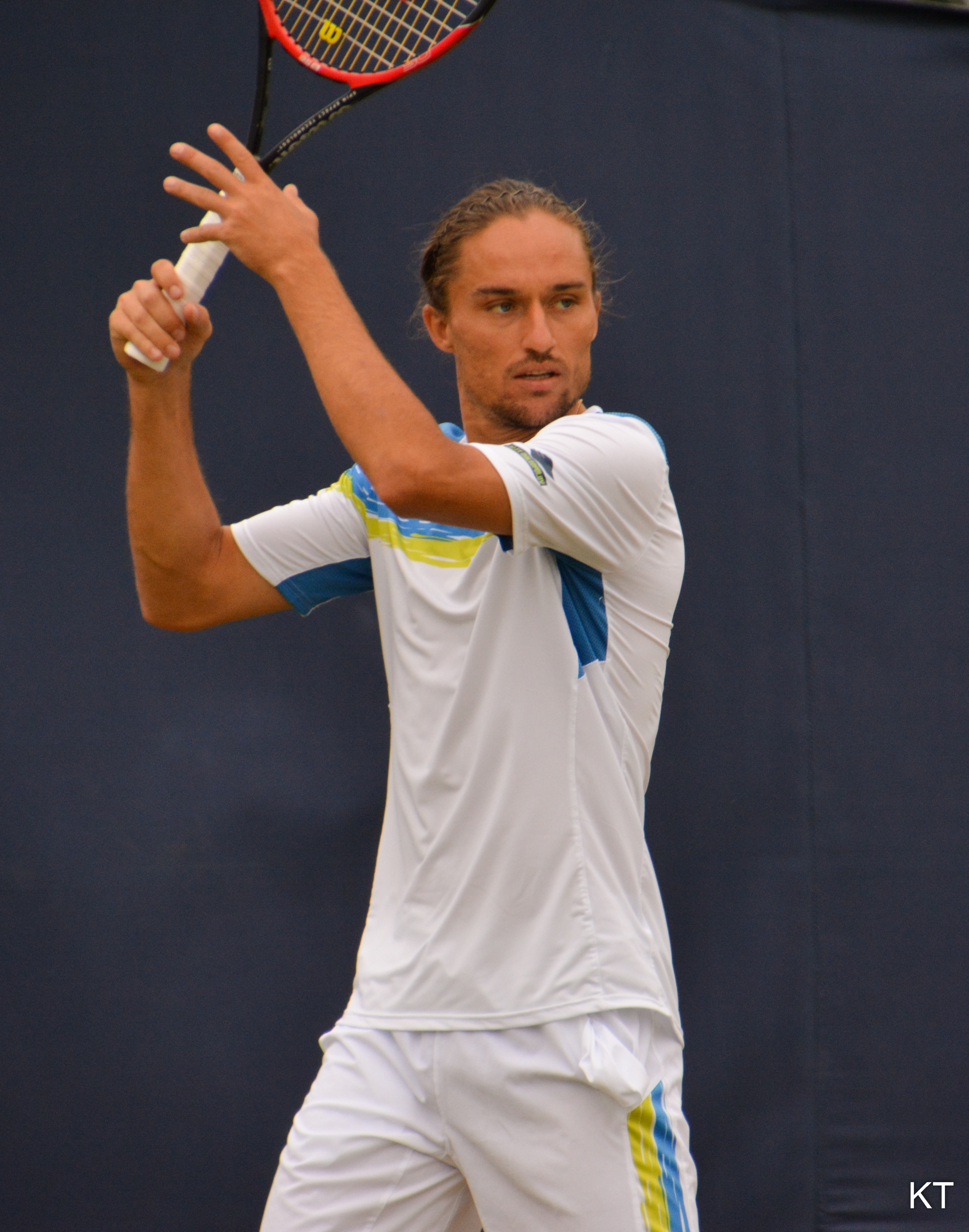
- Dolgopolov at the 2015 Aegon Championships
- Native name: Олександр Долгополов
- Country (sports): Ukraine
- Born: 7 November 1988 (age 37) Kyiv, Ukrainian SSR, Soviet Union
- Height: 1.80 m (5 ft 11 in)
- Turned pro: 2006
- Retired: 2021 (last match 2018)
- Plays: Right-handed (two-handed backhand)
- Coach: Oleksandr Dolgopolov Sr. (1988–2009); Jack Reader (2009–2012); Oleksandr Dolgopolov Sr. (2013–2021); Félix Mantilla (2015–2016); Stas Khmarskiy (2017–2021)
- Prize money: US$ 7,125,771

Singles
- Career record: 221–201
- Career titles: 3
- Highest ranking: No. 13 (16 January 2012)

Grand Slam singles results
- Australian Open: QF (2011)
- French Open: 3R (2010, 2011)
- Wimbledon: 3R (2013, 2014)
- US Open: 4R (2011, 2017)

Doubles
- Career record: 27–57
- Career titles: 1
- Highest ranking: No. 42 (9 January 2012)

Grand Slam doubles results
- Australian Open: 2R (2011, 2014)
- French Open: 2R (2010, 2011, 2012)
- Wimbledon: 1R (2010, 2016)
- US Open: 1R (2010, 2011, 2012, 2013, 2016)

Team competitions
- Davis Cup: 5–5
- Hopman Cup: F (2016)

Alexandr Dolgopolov (born 7 November 1988), formerly known as Oleksandr Dolgopolov Jr. (Ukrainian: Олександр Олександрович Долгополов, romanized: Oleksandr Oleksandrovych Dolhopolov), is a Ukrainian retired professional tennis player. He changed his forename spelling to the current form in May 2010. Dolgopolov reached the quarterfinals of the 2011 Australian Open and achieved a career-high singles ranking of World No. 13 in January 2012.

== Early life ==
Alexandr's father, Oleksandr Sr., was a professional tennis player for the Soviet team, and his mother was a gymnast. He started playing tennis at age 3, coached by his father. The senior Dolgopolov was also the coach of Andrei Medvedev, Ukraine's most successful tennis player to date. At a young age, Dolgopolov lived on the tour with his parents, traveling frequently and playing players such as Medvedev, Andre Agassi, and Boris Becker. Players such as Jim Courier remembered hitting balls with Dolgopolov when he was a toddler.

== Tennis career ==
=== Juniors ===
As a junior, Dolgopolov reached as high as No. 21 in the combined world rankings in January 2005. His best showing at a junior major was a quarterfinal at the 2005 French Open Boys' Singles, where he lost to Antal van der Duim.

=== 2006–2009 ===
Dolgopolov made his ATP Tour debut in September 2006 at the BCR Open Romania as a qualifier, losing in the first round to Christophe Rochus. He was also part of the Ukrainian Davis Cup team in the tie against Great Britain, where he was defeated by Andy Murray.

Eventually, the younger Dolgopolov decided that he wanted less of his father's influence and develop himself in his own way. In 2009, at age 20, he parted ways with his father and enlisted the help of Australian Jack Reader as his coach. He also changed his name from Oleksandr Dolgopolov Jr. to Alexandr Dolgopolov. Dolgopolov and his father didn't speak for six months but have since reconciled with Dolgopolov Sr. stating that he is very proud of his son.

=== 2010: French Open third round ===
Dolgopolov started the year at the 2010 Brisbane International, where he qualified for the tournament by beating Joseph Sirianni and Kaden Hensel. In the main draw, he defeated Bernard Tomic, before losing in the second round to Radek Štěpánek in three sets. At the 2010 Australian Open, he lost in the first round of qualifying to Simon Stadler in three sets.

Dolgopolov qualified for the 2010 Monte-Carlo Rolex Masters with wins over Santiago Ventura and Mischa Zverev, but lost to Julien Benneteau in the first round. Dolgopolov continued to the 2010 Mutua Madrileña Madrid Open, where he qualified to get into the tournament. In the first round, he beat Andreas Seppi, but in the second round lost to eventual champion Rafael Nadal in straight sets.

At the 2010 French Open, he beat Arnaud Clément in a long five-setter. Dolgopolov upset 12th seed Fernando González in straight sets. This was the biggest win in his career and best showing at a Grand Slam up to that point. In the third round, he lost to Nicolás Almagro.

Dolgopolov started off his grass-court season seeded seventh at the Aegon International, with wins over Jamie Baker, Lu Yen-hsun, and James Ward, before falling to Michaël Llodra in the semifinals, despite being 4–1 up in the second set. Dolgopolov defeated Marco Chiudinelli in the first round of the 2010 Wimbledon Championships. He put on a solid performance against Jo-Wilfried Tsonga in the second round, but ultimately succumbed to the Frenchman in five sets.

=== 2011: Australian Open quarterfinal, first ATP title, US Open fourth round, top 15 year-end ranking ===
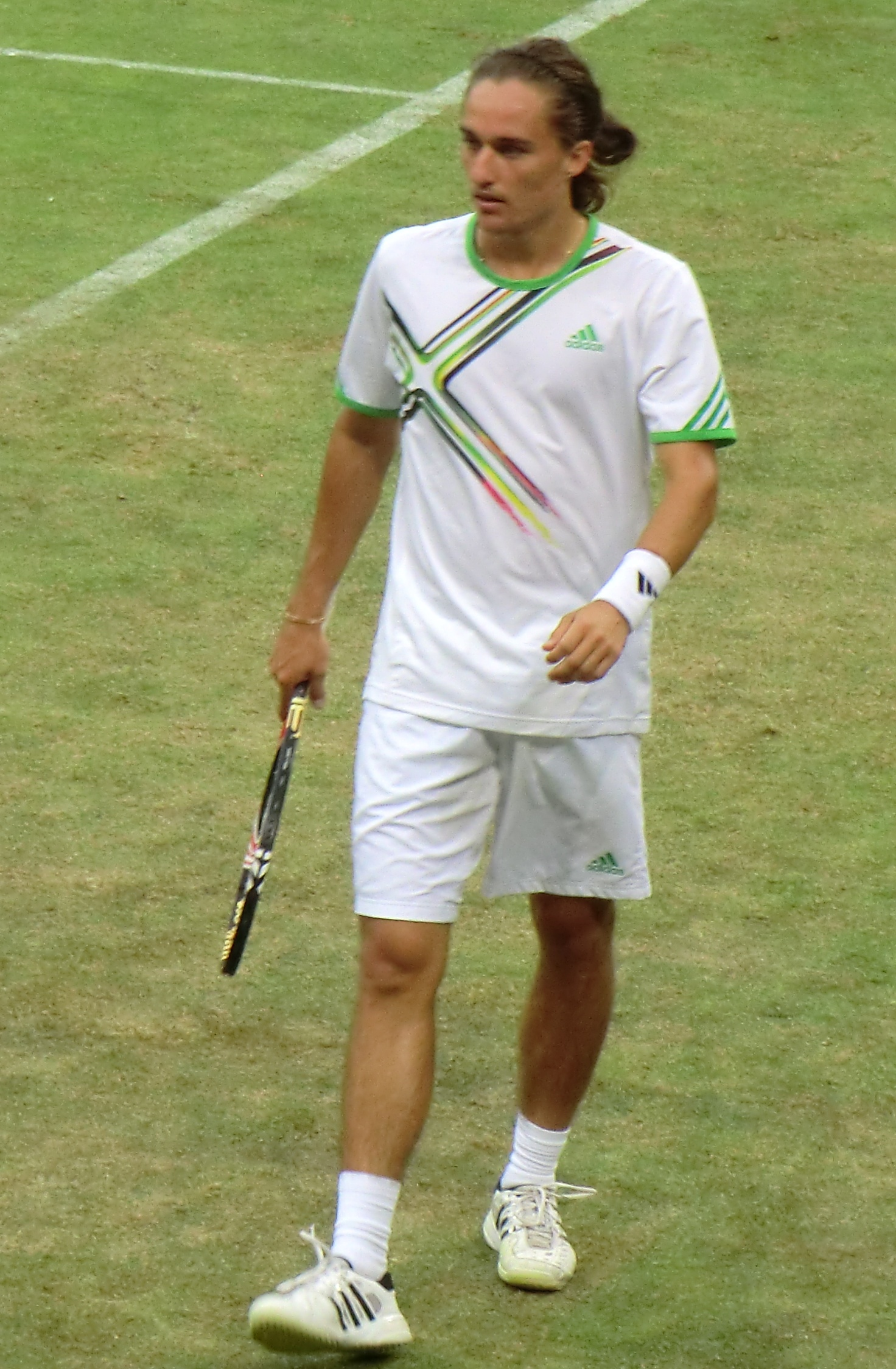
Dolgopolov playing at the 2011 Halle Open

Dolgopolov began 2011 at the Medibank International in Sydney, where he won the first two rounds over Bernard Tomic and top-seeded Sam Querrey, and later lost to the eventual champion, Gilles Simon, in the quarterfinals.

At the 2011 Australian Open, Dolgopolov had his best showing at a Grand Slam thus far, reaching the quarterfinals. He beat Mikhail Kukushkin and Benjamin Becker in the first two rounds, then avenged his defeat to Jo-Wilfried Tsonga at The Championships, Wimbledon in 2010, in five sets. He went on to beat world no. 4 Robin Söderling in the fourth round, reaching his first Major quarterfinal. In the quarterfinals, he lost to Andy Murray, the fifth seed, in four sets.

Dolgopolov next hit the clay courts of Latin America. He entered the 2011 Brasil Open in Costa do Sauípe as the fourth seed, receiving a first-round bye. He defeated Rubén Ramírez Hidalgo in the second round. He then beat Potito Starace in the quarterfinals and crushed home-town favourite Ricardo Mello to enter his first ATP tour final. He was defeated by the top seed, world no. 13 Nicolás Almagro in two sets. Dolgopolov then headed to Buenos Aires to play in the 2011 Copa Claro as the seventh seed. He suffered a surprising first-round defeat to Argentinian wildcard José Acasuso in straight sets. However, partnering Igor Andreev, Dolgopolov reached his first ATP tour doubles semifinal, but lost to eventual champions Oliver Marach and Leonardo Mayer. Dolgopolov then participated in the final leg of the Golden Triangle swing in the 2011 Abierto Mexicano Telcel tournament in Acapulco, as the sixth seed. He defeated Chilean Paul Capdeville in the first round, and then beat doubles partner Carlos Berlocq in the second round. He reached the semifinals after beating fourth seed Stanislas Wawrinka but lost to top seed and world no. 6 David Ferrer in three sets.

Dolgopolov next entered the first Masters 1000 series of the year at Indian Wells, his debut in the tournament. As the 20th seed, he received a first-round bye, and then beat Romanian Victor Hănescu to reach the third round, where he faced Grand Slam champion Juan Martín del Potro. He lost the match in straight sets. Dolgopolov was also entered in the doubles tournament. Partnering Xavier Malisse, they defeated Tomáš Berdych and Janko Tipsarević and then shocked top seeds and world no. 1 Mike Bryan and Bob Bryan. They played Jamie Murray and Andy Murray next and defeated the British brothers after being a set down, a break down, and 1–6 down in the super tiebreak. Dolgopolov and Malisse then beat Rohan Bopanna and Aisam-ul-Haq Qureshi in the semifinals to enter Dolgopolov's first ATP tour doubles final. They played 2008 Beijing gold medalists Roger Federer and Stanislas Wawrinka, and they prevailed in a super tiebreak.

Dolgopolov continued his form at the next Masters event, the 2011 Sony Ericsson Open in Miami, reaching the fourth round with wins against Italian Andreas Seppi and Jo-Wilfried Tsonga. He then lost to world no. 1 Rafael Nadal in straight sets.

Dolgopolov then suffered a disappointing start to the clay season, suffering four consecutive first-round defeats. He was defeated in the first round of the 2011 Monte-Carlo Rolex Masters by Ernests Gulbis and then lost to Nikolay Davydenko in the 2011 Barcelona Open Banco Sabadell. He was then beaten by Santiago Giraldo in the 2011 Mutua Madrid Open and finally by Potito Starace at the 2011 Internazionali BNL d'Italia. It was later disclosed that he was suffering from pancreatitis since the North American swing, which led him to play sparingly during the early clay season.

Dolgopolov managed to regain some of his earlier form in his last clay tournament, 2011 Open de Nice Côte d'Azur, before the 2011 French Open. He beat Filippo Volandri and Pere Riba to reach the quarterfinals. There, Dolgopolov pulled off an upset win over top seed David Ferrer. He lost to Victor Hănescu in straight sets in the semifinals.

Dolgopolov entered the 2011 French Open as the 21st seed. In his first-round match, he played the oldest player in the ATP top 100, Rainer Schüttler at age 35, and won the match easily. He then beat Andreas Haider-Maurer comfortably to move into the third round but was beaten by Serbian 15th seed Viktor Troicki in four sets.

Moving to the grass courts of Europe, Dolgopolov's first tournament was the 2011 Gerry Weber Open, seeded seventh, he faced Robin Haase in the first round and defeated him in three sets before succumbing to Philipp Kohlschreiber in two sets. Dolgopolov's next tournament was the 2011 Aegon International, where he was seeded second. He lost to Carlos Berlocq in straight sets. His dismal grass-court season continued into Wimbledon 2011, where he was seeded 22nd, with a first-round loss to Fernando González (who had not played in almost a year prior to a few small tournaments before Wimbledon).

Before heading into the US Open series of hard-court tournaments, Dolgopolov returned to his beloved clay to play 2011 International German Open in Hamburg. Seeded tenth, he received a first-round bye, and then lost to Finnish player Jarkko Nieminen, despite being up two breaks in the third set. Dolgopolov then travelled to Croatia, where he took part in the 2011 ATP Studena Croatia Open, where he was seeded second. Receiving a first-round bye, he beat Filippo Volandri in the second round, finally winning an opening-round match after suffering four consecutive opening-round exits. In the quarterfinals, he beat Albert Ramos to set up a semifinal meeting with defending champion and former world no. 1 Juan Carlos Ferrero. There, Dolgopolov pulled off an impressive display to defeat the Grand Slam champion in straight sets. Entering his second final of the year, Dolgopolov played Croatian home-town favourite, former top-10 player and fourth seed Marin Čilić. Faced with a determined opponent, Dolgopolov needed three sets to beat Čilić and win his first ATP singles title.

Dolgopolov entered the 2011 Rogers Cup unseeded, missing out on a seeding as world no. 21 (only the top 16 were seeded). He played Canadian wildcard and world no. 290 Érik Chvojka and was stretched to three sets. He was defeated by seventh seed Tomáš Berdych in the second round.

On 18 April 2011, Dolgopolov reached a career-high ranking of no. 20.

Seeded 22nd for the 2011 US Open, Dolgopolov defeated Frederico Gil, Flavio Cipolla, and Ivo Karlović to reach the fourth round, where he faced world no. 1 Novak Djokovic. Dolgopolov took Djokovic to a 28 and a half-minute first-set tiebreak, with Djokovic finally prevailing 16–14. Dolgopolov went on to a three set defeat, ending his US Open campaign.

=== 2012: Highest career ranking, ATP 500 title ===
Seeded 4th for the 2012 Brisbane International tournament, Dolgopolov defeated Alejandro Falla, Igor Andreev, Radek Štěpánek, and Gilles Simon to make it to the final, where he lost to Andy Murray. This loss was attributed to fatigue over a previous groin injury in the semifinal victory over Gilles Simon. As a result, he reached a career-high ranking of No. 13 on 16 January 2012.

At the 2012 Australian Open he lost in the third round to local hope Bernard Tomic.

At the Croatia Open Dolgopolov defeated Italian Fabio Fognini in the second round.

Alexandr Dolgopolov won his first ATP 500 at the Citi Open in Washington, D.C. He defeated Tommy Haas in the final.

=== 2013: Wimbledon third round ===
Dolgopolov reached three quarterfinals during the spring, in Brisbane, Memphis and Munich. However he failed to make impact in Masters 1000 and Grand Slam tournaments, which caused him to steadily fall in rankings. He gave a stern challenge to World No.7 at the time Juan Martín del Potro. After a quiet first half of the year Dolgopolov reached the third round of Wimbledon where he played David Ferrer, leading by two sets to one before eventually being overcome in five sets. In the tournaments after Wimbledon Dolgopolov continued to struggle in finding form from the two previous seasons. Some of the more notable results were beating world No.21 Kevin Anderson in 2013 Rogers Cup and former top 10 player Janko Tipsarević in Japan Open (tennis) where he has reached quarterfinals. Best result of the year for Dolgopolov was a semifinal in 2013 Winston-Salem Open, where he lost to Gaël Monfils.

=== 2014: First Masters 1000 semifinal, return to top 30 ===
Dolgopolov began the year at the Apia International in Sydney, losing in the quarterfinals to eventual runner-up Bernard Tomic. That was followed by a second round loss to Jérémy Chardy at the Australian Open. After losing in the first round of the Chile Open in Viña del Mar, Dolgopolov reached the finals at the inaugural Rio Open in Brazil. He defeated David Ferrer en route to his first final since 2012, however ultimately lost to world no. 1 Rafael Nadal in straight sets.

He continued his good run of form at the BNP Paribas Open in Indian Wells. He beat Nadal in the third round, Fabio Fognini in round of 16 and Milos Raonic in quarter-finals, then lost to Roger Federer in semifinals. It was the first time he has made it beyond the third round of a Masters 1000 tournament since 2012. At the Miami Open, the Ukrainian defeated Stan Wawrinka in round of 16 and lost to Tomáš Berdych in quarter-finals. As a result of his good run of form, Dolgopolov returned to the world's top 30.

During the spring clay season, the player won over Ernest Gulbis in first round of the Monte Carlo Masters, then lost to Guillermo García López. At the Madrid Masters he defeated Fabio Fognini, then lost in second round to Gulbis. At the Rome Masters he lost to Jo-Wilfried Tsonga in first round. At Roland Garros he lost in second round to Marcel Granollers.

Dolgopolov lost to Grigor Dimitrov in Queen's quarter-finals and Wimbledon round of 32.

=== 2015: Second Masters 1000 semifinal ===
In 2015, Dolgopolov lost in first round of the Australian Open to Paolo Lorenzi. At the Mexican Open he lost to Kei Nishikori in quarter-finals. At the Indian Wells Ukrainian he defeated Santiago Giraldo to reach third round, where he lost to Milos Raonic. At the Miami Masters the Ukrainian reached round of 16 after winning over Tommy Robredo, then fell to Novak Djokovic.

In the spring clay season, Dolgopolov lost to Monfils in second round of the Monte-Carlo Masters. At the Rome Masters, he won over Martin Kližan to reach round of 32, where he was defeated by Guillermo García López. At Roland Garros he lost in first round to Nicolás Almagro.

In the grass season, the Ukrainian lost to Kohlschreiber in first round of Stuttgart. At Queen's he defeated Rafael Nadal in first round, then lost to García López in second round. At Nottingham he claimed wins over Donald Young, Pablo Andújar, Dominic Thiem and Yen-Hsun Lu, then lost in semifinals to Sam Querrey. At the Wimbledon Championships, the player fell in second round to Ivo Karlović.

In the North American summer tour, Dolgopolov defeated Karlovich to reach round of 16 at Washington, after which he lost to Alexander Zverev. At the Canada Masters he lost in first round to Grigor Dimitrov.

In Cincinnati he qualified for the main draw by defeating James Ward and Santiago Giraldo, then earned a first round bye due to Kei Nishikori's withdrawal and won over Bernard Tomic, Jerzy Janowicz and Tomáš Berdych to reach the semi-finals, where he lost to world nº 1 Novak Djokovic in three sets, having won the first.

=== 2016–2017: Hopman Cup finalist, third ATP title, US Open fourth round ===
Dolgopolov represented Ukraine alongside Elina Svitolina at the 2016 Hopman Cup. He won his singles matches against Jack Sock, Jiří Veselý and Lleyton Hewitt. He and Svitolina were the winners of their group in the round robin phase, and went into the final against the Australia Green team. Dolgopolov lost to Nick Kyrgios 3–6, 4–6. The Ukrainian team were the runners-up of the tournament.

Dolgopolov then entered 2016 Wimbledon Championships where he beat Russian Evgeny Donskoy in 4 tight sets to set up a second round match against Daniel Evans which he lost in 3 sets. He then entered the 2016 Citi Open and was seed 11, which meant he received a bye for the first round, in the second round match he faced Australian youngster Jordan Thompson, in the third round he lost in straight sets to Sam Querrey. Dolgopolov then proceeded to enter the 2016 Rogers Cup, where he lost to Donald Young in straight sets in the first round.

Dolgopolov won his third ATP title at the 2017 Argentina Open defeating top seeded Japanese player Kei Nishikori. He reached the fourth round of the 2017 US Open (tennis) where he was defeated by top seed World No. 1 and eventual champion Rafael Nadal.

=== 2018: Australian Open third round ===
Having gotten to the third round of the 2018 Australian Open for the third time in his career, Dolgopolov was defeated by Diego Schwartzman.

=== 2021: Retirement ===
Dolgopolov announced his retirement on 1 May 2021, having played Novak Djokovic in his final match on 14 May 2018 at the Internazionali BNL d'Italia in Rome.

== Military service ==
In March 2022, he returned to Ukraine as a volunteer to fight against the Russian invasion of Ukraine. He is serving as a drone operator. In April 2022 following Wimbledon's ban on Belarusian and Russian tennis players, he praised the decision while stating "It doesn't matter if they're a world tennis player or just a regular person in Russia", adding "If people are able to keep on living their regular lives, it's going to be tough to change the plans of Putin. Everyone has to feel [the sacrifice] because everyone in Ukraine is feeling it. Our people, our children, are dying and you cannot just close your eyes and be silent and pretend nothing is happening. Everyone has to try and play their role to help and the ATP should have a stronger stance like many others sports. The magnitude of what is happening here is not [reflected] by their actions. Their actions are weaker"

== Davis Cup ==
In his early career, Alex has played two games for his country: in 2006 he lost to Andy Murray in Odesa, in a match against Great Britain. In 2007, he lost to Alexandros Jakupovic from Greece. Later, he was struggling with the Ukrainian tennis federation to get significant bonuses to play in the Davis Cup. On 13 March 2011 Dolgopolov stated he wants to represent Ukraine as a player, but only after the leadership of the Ukrainian Tennis Federation changes. Dolgopolov has hinted in late January 2011 that he might change his citizenship. According to him "Tennis is not a political sport as such as football. In tennis you choose what is best for you, where there are more prospects". At the time, Dolgopolov stated this would mean "of course" he would switch to another Davis Cup team. The President of the Ukrainian Tennis Federation Vadym Shulman stated in late February 2011 that he thought Dolgopolov was bluffing and blackmailing his federation.

== Playing style ==
Dolgopolov had an unorthodox but all-court playing style; he counter-punched when needed, but could also be very offensive. Win or loss, he generally finished his matches with a high number of winners, but also many unforced errors.

His serve has a very quick cadence to it, the motion having little to no pauses within it. This allows him to generate fast first serves and great second serves, which catches most of his opponents off guard. In terms of timing, his service motion is similar to his ground strokes. Dolgopolov is able to quickly and suddenly hit the ball at the last moment, making him one of the most deceptive players on tour, as it is hard to anticipate where he is going to hit the ball. On his service return, he often chips back the first serve. He uses a unique jumping topspin forehand, which can be used to pull his opponents wide off the court.

His backhand is usually hit two-handed with topspin, but he often uses a one-handed slice. He can also flatten his backhand for winners and is capable of generating extremely high pace on that shot. He is not afraid to come to the net to finish off points, and he volleys quite well. With his speed, he is very efficient around the court.

Some have compared his style to Roger Federer's, but the Ukrainian's unusual style of varied pace and spins is more like Andy Murray's among the leading players. He has also been compared to French showman Fabrice Santoro for his unique use of shots and strokes. Unlike Santoro, however, he can flatten his groundstrokes very efficiently in big matches, as seen in the 2011 Australian Open.

His slice is one of the best in the ATP. Following his four-set win over Dolgopolov in 2011 Roland Garros third round, Troicki said that he was not far from going crazy with Dolgopolov's dropshots.

== Health issues ==
Dolgopolov suffers from a hereditary disorder known as Gilbert's syndrome, which affects his liver, blood and often causes fatigue. His condition worsens when he has to cross continents in extensive travel, requiring intravenous drug treatments and monitored diets to get himself back on track.

== Career statistics ==
Key
W	F	SF	QF	#R	RR	Q#	P#	DNQ	A	Z#	PO	G	S	B	NMS	NTI	P	NH

(W) winner; (F) finalist; (SF) semifinalist; (QF) quarterfinalist; (#R) rounds 4, 3, 2, 1; (RR) round-robin stage; (Q#) qualification round; (P#) preliminary round; (DNQ) did not qualify; (A) absent; (Z#) Davis/Fed Cup Zonal Group (with number indication) or (PO) play-off; (G) gold, (S) silver or (B) bronze Olympic/Paralympic medal; (NMS) not a Masters tournament; (NTI) not a Tier I tournament; (P) postponed; (NH) not held; (SR) strike rate (events won / competed); (W–L) win–loss record.

Tournament	2006	2007	2008	2009	2010	2011	2012	2013	2014	2015	2016	2017	2018	SR	W–L	Win %
Grand Slam tournaments
Australian Open	A	Q1	Q3	Q2	Q1	QF	3R	1R	2R	1R	2R	2R	3R	0 / 8	11–8	58%
French Open	A	Q2	Q1	A	3R	3R	1R	1R	2R	1R	A	2R	A	0 / 7	6–7	46%
Wimbledon	A	A	A	A	2R	1R	2R	3R	3R	2R	2R	1R	A	0 / 8	8–8	50%
US Open	A	A	A	A	1R	4R	3R	2R	A	1R	1R	4R	A	0 / 7	9–7	56%
Win–loss	0–0	0–0	0–0	0–0	3–3	9–4	5–4	3–4	4–3	1–4	2–3	5–4	2–1	0 / 30	34–30	53%

=== Significant finals ===
==== Doubles: 1 (1 title) ====
Result	Date	Tournament	Surface	Partner	Opponents	Score
Win	Mar 2011	Indian Wells Open, United States	Hard	(Belgium) Xavier Malisse	(Switzerland) Roger Federer (Switzerland) Stanislas Wawrinka	6–4, 6–7^{(5–7)}, [10–7]
