= 1993 Monte Carlo Open – Singles =

Singles
- 1993 Monte Carlo Open

Final
- Champion: (Spain) Sergi Bruguera
- Runner-up: (France) Cédric Pioline
- Score: 7–6^{(7–2)}, 6–0

Details
- Draw: 56 (7Q / 4WC)
- Seeds: 16

Events
Singles	Doubles
← 1992 ·	Monte Carlo Open	· 1994 →

Sergi Bruguera defeated Cédric Pioline in the final, 7–6^{(7–2)}, 6–0 to win the singles tennis title at the 1993 Monte Carlo Open.

Thomas Muster was the defending champion, but lost in the semifinals to Bruguera.

== Seeds ==
1. (Sweden) Stefan Edberg (semifinals)
2. (Germany) Boris Becker (second round)
3. (Czech Republic) Petr Korda (third round)
4. (Croatia) Goran Ivanišević (second round)
5. (United States) Ivan Lendl (third round)
6. (Germany) Michael Stich (second round)
7. (Ukraine) Andrei Medvedev (quarterfinals)
8. (Austria) Thomas Muster (semifinals)
9. (Netherlands) Richard Krajicek (third round)
10. (Czech Republic) Karel Nováček (first round)
11. (Spain) Sergi Bruguera (champion)
12. (France) Guy Forget (second round)
13. (Sweden) Henrik Holm (first round)
14. (Spain) Carlos Costa (quarterfinals)
15. (France) Arnaud Boetsch (first round)
16. (France) Fabrice Santoro (first round)

== Draw ==
=== Key ===
- Q = Qualifier
- WC = Wild card
- LL = Lucky loser
- Alt = Alternate
- SE = Special exempt
- PR = Protected ranking
- ITF = ITF entry
- JE = Junior exempt
- w/o = Walkover
- r = Retired
- d = Defaulted
- SR = Special ranking

=== Finals ===
Semifinals
1	(Sweden) Stefan Edberg	4	4
(France) Cédric Pioline	6	6
11	(Spain) Sergi Bruguera	6	1	7^{9}
8	(Austria) Thomas Muster	4	6	6^{7}

Final
(France) Cédric Pioline	6^{2}	0
11	(Spain) Sergi Bruguera	7^{7}	6

=== Section 1 ===
First round
(Switzerland) J Hlasek	3	6^{6}
(France) H Leconte	6	7^{8}
(Sweden) M Gustafsson	6	6
(Netherlands) J Siemerink	4	0
(Spain) J Sánchez	6	3	7
16	(France) F Santoro	4	6	5
9	(Netherlands) R Krajicek	6	6
(Germany) B Karbacher	4	2
(Argentina) G Pérez Roldán	4	6^{8}
(Germany) CU Steeb	6	7^{10}
Q	(France) O Delaître	6	4	1
Q	(Netherlands) T Nijssen	4	6	6

Second round
1	(Sweden) S Edberg	3	7	6
(France) H Leconte	6	5	1
(Sweden) M Gustafsson	2	3
(Spain) J Sánchez	6	6
9	(Netherlands) R Krajicek	7	6
(Germany) CU Steeb	5	1
Q	(Netherlands) T Nijssen	4	0
7	(Ukraine) A Medvedev	6	6

Third round
1	(Sweden) S Edberg	2	7^{7}	6
(Spain) J Sánchez	6	6^{3}	2
9	(Netherlands) R Krajicek	3	4
7	(Ukraine) A Medvedev	6	6

Quarterfinals
1	(Sweden) S Edberg	6	6
7	(Ukraine) A Medvedev	4	3

=== Section 2 ===
First round
(Argentina) G Markus	6^{5}	4
(South Africa) M Ondruska	7^{7}	6
Q	(Czech Republic) T Anzari	6	4	1
(France) C Pioline	1	6	6
(United States) A Krickstein	6	6
13	(Sweden) H Holm	1	2
12	(France) G Forget	6	6
Q	(Croatia) G Prpić	4	4
Q	(Sweden) U Stenlund	6	6
WC	(Italy) D Nargiso	1	1
(Spain) J Arrese	5	4
WC	(Sweden) J Svensson	7	6

Second round
3	(Czech Republic) P Korda	6	6
(South Africa) M Ondruska	3	2
(France) C Pioline	6	2	6
(United States) A Krickstein	2	6	4
12	(France) G Forget	1	1
Q	(Sweden) U Stenlund	6	6
WC	(Sweden) J Svensson	6^{0}	6	6
6	(Germany) M Stich	7^{7}	4	0

Third round
3	(Czech Republic) P Korda	3	0
(France) C Pioline	6	6
Q	(Sweden) U Stenlund	0	1
WC	(Sweden) J Svensson	6	6

Quarterfinals
(France) C Pioline	5	7	6
WC	(Sweden) J Svensson	7	5	2

=== Section 3 ===
First round
(Spain) E Sánchez	6	6
(Italy) O Camporese	3	2
(Russia) A Olhovskiy	4	6	6
(Argentina) F Davín	6	4	4
(Italy) R Furlan	4	4
11	(Spain) S Bruguera	6	6
14	(Spain) C Costa	6	6
Q	(Denmark) F Fetterlein	3	1
(Spain) F Clavet	7	6
(Brazil) J Oncins	5	2
WC	(France) R Gilbert	6	3	2
(Russia) A Cherkasov	3	6	6

Second round
5	(United States) I Lendl	7	6
(Spain) E Sánchez	5	3
(Russia) A Olhovskiy	0	1
11	(Spain) S Bruguera	6	6
14	(Spain) C Costa	6	6
(Spain) F Clavet	1	1
(Russia) A Cherkasov	6	6
4	(Croatia) G Ivanišević	4	3

Third round
5	(United States) I Lendl	1	2
11	(Spain) S Bruguera	6	6
14	(Spain) C Costa	6	6
(Russia) A Cherkasov	1	0

Quarterfinals
11	(Spain) S Bruguera	7^{10}	6
14	(Spain) C Costa	6^{8}	2

=== Section 4 ===
First round
(Brazil) L Mattar	0	4
(Russia) A Chesnokov	6	6
WC	(Sweden) T Enqvist	5	1
(Netherlands) P Haarhuis	7	6
(Sweden) M Larsson	4	6	6
10	(Czech Republic) K Nováček	6	3	4
15	(France) A Boetsch	6	4	1
(Uruguay) M Filippini	3	6	6
Q	(Spain) À Corretja	6	6
(Sweden) C Bergström	1	3
(Switzerland) M Rosset	7^{8}	6
(Sweden) N Kulti	6^{6}	2

Second round
8	(Austria) T Muster	6	6
(Russia) A Chesnokov	2	2
(Netherlands) P Haarhuis	6	2	6^{3}
(Sweden) M Larsson	3	6	7^{7}
(Uruguay) M Filippini	4	4
Q	(Spain) À Corretja	6	6
(Switzerland) M Rosset	7^{7}	6
2	(Germany) B Becker	6^{3}	3

Third round
8	(Austria) T Muster	6	3	6
(Sweden) M Larsson	2	6	0
Q	(Spain) À Corretja	4	6	7^{7}
(Switzerland) M Rosset	6	3	6^{5}

Quarterfinals
8	(Austria) T Muster	6	6
Q	(Spain) À Corretja	2	2
