= 1991 Monte Carlo Open – Singles =

Singles
- 1991 Monte Carlo Open

Final
- Champion: (Spain) Sergi Bruguera
- Runner-up: (West Germany) Boris Becker
- Score: 5–7, 6–4, 7–6^{(8–6)}, 7–6^{(7–4)}

Details
- Draw: 56 (7Q / 5WC)
- Seeds: 16

Events
Singles	Doubles
← 1990 ·	Monte Carlo Open	· 1992 →

Sergi Bruguera defeated Boris Becker in the final, 5–7, 6–4, 7–6^{(8–6)}, 7–6^{(7–4)} to win the singles tennis title at the 1991 Monte Carlo Open.

Andrei Chesnokov was the defending champion, but lost to Boris Becker in the quarterfinals.

== Seeds ==
The top eight seeds received a bye to the second round.

1. (Sweden) Stefan Edberg (second round)
2. (West Germany) Boris Becker (final)
3. (France) Guy Forget (third round)
4. (United States) Andre Agassi (second round)
5. (Socialist Federal Republic of Yugoslavia) Goran Ivanišević (third round)
6. (Sweden) Jonas Svensson (quarterfinals)
7. (Spain) Emilio Sánchez (second round)
8. (Soviet Union) Andrei Chesnokov (quarterfinals)
9. (Spain) Sergi Bruguera (champion)
10. (Soviet Union) Andrei Cherkasov (third round)
11. (Austria) Thomas Muster (first round)
12. (Ecuador) Andrés Gómez (first round)
13. (Switzerland) Marc Rosset (first round)
14. (Czechoslovakia) Karel Nováček (first round)
15. (Argentina) Guillermo Pérez Roldán (second round)
16. (Soviet Union) Alexander Volkov (third round)

== Draw ==
=== Key ===
- Q = Qualifier
- WC = Wild card
- LL = Lucky loser
- Alt = Alternate
- SE = Special exempt
- PR = Protected ranking
- ITF = ITF entry
- JE = Junior exempt
- w/o = Walkover
- r = Retired
- d = Defaulted
- SR = Special ranking

=== Finals ===
Quarterfinals
(Sweden) Magnus Gustafsson	5	5
9	(Spain) Sergi Bruguera	7	7
(Austria) Horst Skoff	6	6
6	(Sweden) Jonas Svensson	3	3
WC	(Germany) Carl-Uwe Steeb	4	2
(Socialist Federal Republic of Yugoslavia) Goran Prpić	6	6
8	(Soviet Union) Andrei Chesnokov	1	3
2	(Germany) Boris Becker	6	6

Semifinals
9	(Spain) Sergi Bruguera	6	6
(Austria) Horst Skoff	1	4
(Socialist Federal Republic of Yugoslavia) Goran Prpić	3	3
2	(Germany) Boris Becker	6	6

Final
9	(Spain) Sergi Bruguera	5	6	7^{8}	7^{7}
2	(Germany) Boris Becker	7	4	6^{6}	6^{4}

=== Top half ===
==== Section 1 ====
First round
(Sweden) M Larsson	6	6
Q	(Czechoslovakia) D Rikl	3	1
(Sweden) M Gustafsson	4	6	6
Q	(Germany) U Riglewski	6	2	4
Q	(France) T Tulasne	0	4
15	(Argentina) G Pérez Roldán	6	6
9	(Spain) S Bruguera	6	6^{5}	6
(Italy) R Furlan	3	7^{7}	3
(France) H Leconte	5	6	1
(Italy) C Caratti	7	2	6
(United States) J Arias	2	6^{6}
WC	(Argentina) A Mancini	6	7^{8}

Second round
1	(Sweden) S Edberg	7	3	6^{3}
(Sweden) M Larsson	5	6	7^{7}
(Sweden) M Gustafsson	6	6
15	(Argentina) G Pérez Roldán	4	3
9	(Spain) S Bruguera	6	7
(Italy) C Caratti	1	5
WC	(Argentina) A Mancini	6	6
7	(Spain) E Sánchez	3	3

Third round
(Sweden) M Larsson	6^{2}	4
(Sweden) M Gustafsson	7^{7}	6
9	(Spain) S Bruguera	6	6
WC	(Argentina) A Mancini	1	4

Quarterfinals
(Sweden) M Gustafsson	5	5
9	(Spain) S Bruguera	7	7

==== Section 2 ====
First round
(France) JP Fleurian	6	4	2
(Austria) H Skoff	4	6	6
(Sweden) P Lundgren	1	4
(Spain) J Aguilera	6	6
Q	(Italy) C Pistolesi	7^{9}	5	6
13	(Switzerland) M Rosset	6^{7}	7	3
11	(Austria) T Muster	7^{9}	2	1
Q	(Finland) V Paloheimo	6^{7}	6	6
(Netherlands) M Koevermans	6	6
(Brazil) L Mattar	3	2
(Argentina) F Davín	4	0^{r}
Q	(Romania) D Pescariu	6	1

Second round
4	(United States) A Agassi	0	7^{7}	3
(Austria) H Skoff	6	6^{3}	6
(Spain) J Aguilera	3	6	5
Q	(Italy) C Pistolesi	6	1	7
Q	(Finland) V Paloheimo	7	6
(Netherlands) M Koevermans	5	4
Q	(Romania) D Pescariu	3	6	4
6	(Sweden) J Svensson	6	4	6

Third round
(Austria) H Skoff	6	7
Q	(Italy) C Pistolesi	2	5
Q	(Finland) V Paloheimo	1	6	3
6	(Sweden) J Svensson	6	4	6

Quarterfinals
(Austria) H Skoff	6	6
6	(Sweden) J Svensson	3	3

=== Bottom half ===
==== Section 3 ====
First round
(Spain) J Arrese	6	6
WC	(Sweden) B Borg	2	3
WC	(France) T Champion	6	4	3
WC	(Germany) C-U Steeb	2	6	6
(Italy) O Camporese	6	3	6
12	(Ecuador) A Gómez	3	6	1
14	(Czechoslovakia) K Nováček	2	4
(Socialist Federal Republic of Yugoslavia) G Prpić	6	6
(Argentina) M Jaite	3	2
(Australia) R Fromberg	6	6
(Sweden) C Bergström	0	2
(Netherlands) P Haarhuis	6	6

Second round
5	(Socialist Federal Republic of Yugoslavia) G Ivanišević	7^{7}	7^{7}
(Spain) J Arrese	6^{4}	6^{5}
WC	(Germany) C-U Steeb	6	6
(Italy) O Camporese	4	3
(Socialist Federal Republic of Yugoslavia) G Prpić	6	6
(Australia) R Fromberg	1	4
(Netherlands) P Haarhuis	5	4
3	(France) G Forget	7	6

Third round
5	(Socialist Federal Republic of Yugoslavia) G Ivanišević	6	0	2
WC	(Germany) C-U Steeb	2	6	6
(Socialist Federal Republic of Yugoslavia) G Prpić	6	6
3	(France) G Forget	2	0

Quarterfinals
WC	(Germany) C-U Steeb	4	2
(Socialist Federal Republic of Yugoslavia) G Prpić	6	6

==== Section 4 ====
First round
(Sweden) M Wilander	6	6
WC	(Australia) M Woodforde	0	3
(Sweden) N Kulti	6	6^{3}	6^{2}
(Haiti) R Agénor	2	7^{7}	7^{7}
(Germany) E Jelen	0	2
10	(Soviet Union) A Cherkasov	6	6
16	(Soviet Union) A Volkov	5	6	7
(Argentina) H de la Peña	7	3	5
Q	(France) T Guardiola	3	1
(France) F Santoro	6	6
(Uruguay) M Filippini	1	1
(Spain) J Sánchez	6	6

Second round
8	(Soviet Union) A Chesnokov	7^{7}	6
(Sweden) M Wilander	6^{3}	2
(Haiti) R Agénor	6^{4}	3
10	(Soviet Union) A Cherkasov	7^{7}	6
16	(Soviet Union) A Volkov	2	6	6
(France) F Santoro	6	1	4
(Spain) J Sánchez	7^{7}	3	3
2	(West Germany) B Becker	6^{3}	6	6

Third round
8	(Soviet Union) A Chesnokov	6	6
10	(Soviet Union) A Cherkasov	1	0
16	(Soviet Union) A Volkov	6	1	1
2	(West Germany) B Becker	3	6	6

Quarterfinals
8	(Soviet Union) A Chesnokov	1	3
2	(West Germany) B Becker	6	6
