= 1992 Monte Carlo Open – Singles =

Singles
- 1992 Monte Carlo Open

Final
- Champion: (Austria) Thomas Muster
- Runner-up: (United States) Aaron Krickstein
- Score: 6–3, 6–1, 6–3

Details
- Draw: 56 (6Q / 3WC)
- Seeds: 16

Events
Singles	Doubles
← 1991 ·	Monte Carlo Open	· 1993 →

Thomas Muster defeated Aaron Krickstein in the final, 6–3, 6–1, 6–3 to win the singles tennis title at the 1992 Monte Carlo Open.

Sergi Bruguera was the defending champion, but lost in the second round to Goran Prpić.

== Seeds ==
1. (Germany) Boris Becker (third round)
2. (United States) Pete Sampras (second round)
3. (Germany) Michael Stich (quarterfinals)
4. (France) Guy Forget (third round)
5. (Croatia) ~~Goran Ivanišević~~ (withdrew)
6. (Czechoslovakia) Petr Korda (second round)
7. (Argentina) Alberto Mancini (second round)
8. (Sweden) Magnus Gustafsson (second round)
9. (Czechoslovakia) Karel Nováček (third round)
10. (Spain) Emilio Sánchez (third round)
11. (Spain) Sergi Bruguera (second round)
12. (Netherlands) Richard Krajicek (first round)
13. (Commonwealth of Independent States) Alexander Volkov (second round)
14. (Switzerland) Jakob Hlasek (first round)
15. (South Africa) Wayne Ferreira (third round)
16. (United States) Aaron Krickstein (final)

== Draw ==
=== Key ===
- Q = Qualifier
- WC = Wild card
- LL = Lucky loser
- Alt = Alternate
- ITF = ITF entry
- PR = Protected ranking
- SR = Special ranking
- SE = Special exempt
- JE = Junior exempt
- JR = Junior Accelerator Programme entrant
- CO = College Accelerator Programme entrant
- NG = Next Gen Accelerator Program entrant
- w/o = Walkover
- r = Retired
- d = Defaulted

=== Finals ===
Semifinals
16	(United States) Aaron Krickstein	6	6
(Croatia) Goran Prpić	1	1
(Austria) Thomas Muster	7	6
(France) Arnaud Boetsch	5	4

Final
16	(United States) Aaron Krickstein	3	1	3
(Austria) Thomas Muster	6	6	6

=== Top half ===
==== Section 1 ====
First round
Q	(Netherlands) T Nijssen	6	6
(Netherlands) P Haarhuis	3	4
LL	(Sweden) L-A Wahlgren	6	6
Q	(Sweden) J Carlsson	3	1
(Netherlands) J Siemerink	3	5
16	(United States) A Krickstein	6	7
9	(Czechoslovakia) K Nováček	6	6
(Commonwealth of Independent States) A Cherkasov	1	4
(Spain) T Carbonell	4	6	6
(France) C Pioline	6	2	2
(Commonwealth of Independent States) A Chesnokov	6	6
Q	(Argentina) J Frana	4	2

Second round
1	(Germany) B Becker	6	3	6
Q	(Netherlands) T Nijssen	2	6	2
LL	(Sweden) L-A Wahlgren	1	1
16	(United States) A Krickstein	6	6
9	(Czechoslovakia) K Nováček	6	4	6
(Spain) T Carbonell	1	6	3
(Commonwealth of Independent States) A Chesnokov	7^{7}	6
8	(Sweden) M Gustafsson	6^{5}	4

Third round
1	(Germany) B Becker	1	4
16	(United States) A Krickstein	6	6
9	(Czechoslovakia) K Nováček	2	5
(Commonwealth of Independent States) A Chesnokov	6	7

Quarterfinals
16	(United States) A Krickstein	6	7^{7}
(Commonwealth of Independent States) A Chesnokov	1	6^{1}

==== Section 2 ====
First round
Q	(Netherlands) M Koevermans	3	4
(Italy) R Furlan	6	6
(Spain) J Sánchez	7^{7}	6
(Spain) J Arrese	6^{2}	2
(Sweden) C Bergström	6	6^{5}	6
14	(Switzerland) J Hlasek	1	7^{7}	3
11	(Spain) S Bruguera	6	2	7
(Spain) F Clavet	4	6	5
(Croatia) G Prpić	4	6	6
(Italy) O Camporese	6	4	3
(Sweden) J Svensson	4	6^{4}
(Sweden) M Larsson	6	7^{7}

Second round
3/WC	(Germany) M Stich	7	6
(Italy) R Furlan	5	4
(Spain) J Sánchez	6	7^{7}
(Sweden) C Bergström	3	6^{3}
11	(Spain) S Bruguera	6	4	0
(Croatia) G Prpić	4	6	6
(Sweden) M Larsson	6	6
6	(Czechoslovakia) P Korda	3	3

Third round
3/WC	(Germany) M Stich	6	7^{7}
(Spain) J Sánchez	4	6^{5}
(Croatia) G Prpić	7	3	6
(Sweden) M Larsson	5	6	3

Quarterfinals
3/WC	(Germany) M Stich	6^{5}	6	5
(Croatia) G Prpić	7^{7}	4	7

=== Bottom half ===
==== Section 3 ====
First round
(France) F Santoro	7^{8}	5
(France) F Fontang	6^{6}	2^{r}
(France) T Champion	7^{8}	6
(Austria) H Skoff	6^{6}	2
(Switzerland) M Rosset	6	6
12	(Netherlands) R Krajicek	2	4
13	(Commonwealth of Independent States) A Volkov	5	7	6
Q	(Latvia) G Dzelde	7	5	2
(Austria) T Muster	3	6	6
WC	(France) H Leconte	6	4	3
(Peru) J Yzaga	6^{4}	2
Q	(Spain) F Roig	7^{7}	6

Second round
Q	(Sweden) M Tillström	6	6
(France) F Santoro	0	4
(France) T Champion	5	2
(Switzerland) M Rosset	7	6
13	(Commonwealth of Independent States) A Volkov	2	6	1
(Austria) T Muster	6	4	6
Q	(Spain) F Roig	1	6	4
4	(France) G Forget	6	3	6

Third round
Q	(Sweden) M Tillström	6^{2}	6	6
(Switzerland) M Rosset	7^{7}	4	2
(Austria) T Muster	7^{7}	4	6
4	(France) G Forget	6^{3}	6	3

Quarterfinals
Q	(Sweden) M Tillström	3	6	3
(Austria) T Muster	6	4	6

==== Section 4 ====
First round
(Argentina) C Miniussi	3	2
(France) A Boetsch	6	6
(Italy) S Pescosolido	1	7^{7}	7
WC	(Italy) C Caratti	6	6^{5}	5
(France) O Delaître	1	0
10	(Spain) E Sánchez	6	6
15	(South Africa) W Ferreira	7^{7}	6
WC	(Sweden) B Borg	6^{5}	2
(Argentina) G Pérez Roldán	1^{r}
(Spain) C Costa	3
(Argentina) M Jaite	2	6	6^{5}
(Germany) C-U Steeb	6	4	7^{7}

Second round
7	(Argentina) A Mancini	5	6^{3}
(France) A Boetsch	7	7^{7}
(Italy) S Pescosolido	6	6^{4}	6^{4}
10	(Spain) E Sánchez	3	7^{7}	7^{7}
15	(South Africa) W Ferreira	4	6	6
(Spain) C Costa	6	3	4
(Germany) C-U Steeb	6	6
2	(United States) P Sampras	3	4

Third round
(France) A Boetsch	4	6	6
10	(Spain) E Sánchez	6	1	2
15	(South Africa) W Ferreira	2	1
(Germany) C-U Steeb	6	6

Quarterfinals
(France) A Boetsch	1	6	6
(Germany) C-U Steeb	6	2	0
