= 1992 Monte Carlo Open – Doubles =

Doubles
- 1992 Monte Carlo Open

Final
- Champions: (Germany) Boris Becker (Germany) Michael Stich
- Runners-up: (Czechoslovakia) Petr Korda (Czechoslovakia) Karel Nováček
- Score: 6–4, 6–4

Details
- Draw: 28 (4WC/2Q)
- Seeds: 8

Events
Singles	Doubles
- Monte-Carlo Masters

Luke Jensen and Laurie Warder were the defending champions, but lost in semifinals to Petr Korda and Karel Nováček.

Boris Becker and Michael Stich won the title by defeating Petr Korda and Karel Nováček 6–4, 6–4 in the final.

== Seeds ==
The top four seeds received a bye to the second round.

1. (United States) Luke Jensen / (Australia) Laurie Warder (semifinals)
2. (Netherlands) Tom Nijssen / (Czechoslovakia) Cyril Suk (semifinals)
3. (Spain) Sergio Casal / (Spain) Emilio Sánchez (second round)
4. (South Africa) Wayne Ferreira / (Argentina) Javier Frana (quarterfinals)
5. (Netherlands) Paul Haarhuis / (Netherlands) Mark Koevermans (second round)
6. (Ecuador) Andrés Gómez / (Spain) Javier Sánchez (first round)
7. (Sweden) Ronnie Båthman / (Sweden) Rikard Bergh (quarterfinals)
8. (Netherlands) Hendrik Jan Davids / (Czechoslovakia) Libor Pimek (first round)

== Draw ==
Key

- Q = Qualifier
- WC = Wild card
- LL = Lucky loser
- Alt = Alternate
- ITF = ITF entry
- PR = Protected ranking
- SR = Special ranking
- SE = Special exempt
- JE = Junior exempt
- JR = Junior Accelerator Programme entrant
- CO = College Accelerator Programme entrant
- NG = Next Gen Accelerator Program entrant
- w/o = Walkover
- r = Retired
- d = Defaulted

=== Finals ===
Semifinals
1	(United States) Luke Jensen (Australia) Laurie Warder	2	3
(Czechoslovakia) Petr Korda (Czechoslovakia) Karel Nováček	6	6
WC	(Germany) Boris Becker (Germany) Michael Stich	6	7
2	(Netherlands) Tom Nijssen (Czechoslovakia) Cyril Suk	3	6

Final
(Czechoslovakia) Petr Korda (Czechoslovakia) Karel Nováček	4	4
WC	(Germany) Boris Becker (Germany) Michael Stich	6	6

=== Top half ===
First round
(Czechoslovakia) V Flégl (South Africa) C van Rensburg	1	7	6
(South Africa) P Aldrich (South Africa) D Visser	6	6	7
(United States) M Keil (United States) D Randall	2	3
(Latvia) Ģ Dzelde (Uruguay) D Pérez	6	6
(Switzerland) J Hlasek (Switzerland) M Rosset	6	7
8	(Netherlands) HJ Davids (Czechoslovakia) L Pimek	2	5
(France) G Forget (France) H Leconte	4	6	7
(Italy) D Nargiso (Germany) U Riglewski	6	3	6
(Czechoslovakia) P Korda (Czechoslovakia) K Nováček	6	6
WC	(Germany) E Jelen (Germany) CU Steeb	1	1
(Argentina) G Luza (Argentina) C Miniussi	3	6
5	(Netherlands) P Haarhuis (Netherlands) M Koevermans	6	7

Second round
1	(United States) L Jensen (Australia) L Warder	6	7	7
(South Africa) P Aldrich (South Africa) D Visser	7	6	6
(Latvia) Ģ Dzelde (Uruguay) D Pérez	3	4
(Switzerland) J Hlasek (Switzerland) M Rosset	6	6
3	(Spain) S Casal (Spain) E Sánchez	4	4
(France) G Forget (France) H Leconte	6	6
(Czechoslovakia) P Korda (Czechoslovakia) K Nováček	5	6	6
5	(Netherlands) P Haarhuis (Netherlands) M Koevermans	7	4	4

Quarterfinals
1	(United States) L Jensen (Australia) L Warder	6	6
(Switzerland) J Hlasek (Switzerland) M Rosset	3	2
(France) G Forget (France) H Leconte	6	5	1
(Czechoslovakia) P Korda (Czechoslovakia) K Nováček	1	7	6

Semifinals
1	(United States) L Jensen (Australia) L Warder	2	3
(Czechoslovakia) P Korda (Czechoslovakia) K Nováček	6	6

=== Bottom half ===
First round
6	(Ecuador) A Gómez (Spain) J Sánchez	4	7	5
(Spain) T Carbonell (Spain) C Costa	6	5	7
WC	(Germany) B Becker (Germany) M Stich	6	7
Q	(Spain) J Arrese (Spain) F Roig	3	6
(Italy) O Camporese (Croatia) G Prpić	6	6
Q	(Sweden) J Carlsson (Sweden) LA Wahlgren	4	3
7	(Sweden) R Båthman (Sweden) R Bergh	7	6
WC	(Iran) M Bahrami (France) A Boetsch	5	4
(Mexico) J Lozano (Brazil) C Motta	7	4	4
(United States) P Galbraith (United States) S Melville	6	6	6
(Netherlands) R Krajicek (Netherlands) J Siemerink	6	6
WC	(Sweden) B Borg (Sweden) N Kroon	1	4

Second round
(Spain) T Carbonell (Spain) C Costa	6	3
WC	(Germany) B Becker (Germany) M Stich	7	6
(Italy) O Camporese (Croatia) G Prpić	4	6	4
4	(South Africa) W Ferreira (Argentina) J Frana	6	2	6
7	(Sweden) R Båthman (Sweden) R Bergh	6	6
(United States) P Galbraith (United States) S Melville	4	4
(Netherlands) R Krajicek (Netherlands) J Siemerink	7	4	6
2	(Netherlands) T Nijssen (Czechoslovakia) C Suk	6	6	7

Quarterfinals
WC	(Germany) B Becker (Germany) M Stich	3	6	6
4	(South Africa) W Ferreira (Argentina) J Frana	6	1	4
7	(Sweden) R Båthman (Sweden) R Bergh	5	4
2	(Netherlands) T Nijssen (Czechoslovakia) C Suk	7	6

Semifinals
WC	(Germany) B Becker (Germany) M Stich	6	7
2	(Netherlands) T Nijssen (Czechoslovakia) C Suk	3	6
