= 1994 Monte Carlo Open – Doubles =

Doubles
- 1994 Monte Carlo Open

Final
- Champions: (Sweden) Nicklas Kulti (Sweden) Magnus Larsson
- Runners-up: (Russia) Yevgeny Kafelnikov (Czech Republic) Daniel Vacek
- Score: 3–6, 7–6, 6–4

Details
- Draw: 32
- Seeds: 8

Events
Singles	Doubles
- Monte-Carlo Masters

Stefan Edberg and Petr Korda were the defending champions, but lost in the first round to Gary Muller and Danie Visser.

Nicklas Kulti and Magnus Larsson won the title by defeating Yevgeny Kafelnikov and Daniel Vacek 3–6, 7–6, 6–4 in the final.

== Seeds ==
1. (Canada) Grant Connell / (United States) Patrick Galbraith (quarterfinals)
2. (Netherlands) Paul Haarhuis / (Australia) Mark Woodforde (second round)
3. (Netherlands) Tom Nijssen / (Czech Republic) Cyril Suk (first round)
4. (United States) Luke Jensen / (United States) Murphy Jensen (first round)
5. (Sweden) Stefan Edberg / (Czech Republic) Petr Korda (first round)
6. (Czech Republic) Martin Damm / (Czech Republic) Karel Nováček (second round)
7. (Sweden) Jan Apell / (Sweden) Henrik Holm (second round)
8. (Spain) Sergio Casal / (Spain) Emilio Sánchez (semifinals)

== Draw ==
Key

- Q = Qualifier
- WC = Wild card
- LL = Lucky loser
- Alt = Alternate
- ITF = ITF entry
- PR = Protected ranking
- SR = Special ranking
- SE = Special exempt
- JE = Junior exempt
- JR = Junior Accelerator Programme entrant
- CO = College Accelerator Programme entrant
- NG = Next Gen Accelerator Program entrant
- w/o = Walkover
- r = Retired
- d = Defaulted

=== Finals ===
Semifinals
8	(Spain) Sergio Casal (Spain) Emilio Sánchez	6	3
(Russia) Yevgeny Kafelnikov (Czech Republic) Daniel Vacek	7	6
(South Africa) John-Laffnie de Jager (South Africa) Marcos Ondruska	0	2
Q	(Sweden) Nicklas Kulti (Sweden) Magnus Larsson	6	6

Final
(Russia) Yevgeny Kafelnikov (Czech Republic) Daniel Vacek	6	6	4
Q	(Sweden) Nicklas Kulti (Sweden) Magnus Larsson	3	7	6

=== Top half ===
First round
1	(Canada) G Connell (United States) P Galbraith	2	6	6
(South Africa) W Ferreira (Spain) J Sánchez	6	3	3
(Australia) M Kratzmann (The Bahamas) M Knowles	6	6	5
WC	(Sweden) M Gustafsson (Sweden) J Svensson	3	7	7
Q	(Latvia) Ģ Dzelde (Denmark) M Mortensen	6	6	5
(Germany) U Riglewski (Germany) M Stich	4	7	7
(United States) S DeVries (Australia) D Macpherson	2	4
8	(Spain) S Casal (Spain) E Sánchez	6	6
3	(Netherlands) T Nijssen (Czech Republic) C Suk	2	3
(United States) M Bauer (South Africa) B Talbot	6	6
(Netherlands) HJ Davids (South Africa) P Norval	6	4	6
(Italy) C Brandi (Italy) F Mordegan	2	6	4
(Russia) Y Kafelnikov (Czech Republic) D Vacek	4	7	6
(Germany) P Kühnen (Italy) D Nargiso	6	5	1
WC	(Croatia) G Ivanišević (Switzerland) M Rosset	3	2
6	(Czech Republic) M Damm (Czech Republic) K Nováček	6	6

Second round
1	(Canada) G Connell (United States) P Galbraith	6	5	7
WC	(Sweden) M Gustafsson (Sweden) J Svensson	2	7	5
(Germany) U Riglewski (Germany) M Stich	7	3	4
8	(Spain) S Casal (Spain) E Sánchez	6	6	6
(United States) M Bauer (South Africa) B Talbot	6	6
(Netherlands) HJ Davids (South Africa) P Norval	3	1
(Russia) Y Kafelnikov (Czech Republic) D Vacek	6	6
6	(Czech Republic) M Damm (Czech Republic) K Nováček	3	2

Quarterfinals
1	(Canada) G Connell (United States) P Galbraith	3	2
8	(Spain) S Casal (Spain) E Sánchez	6	6
(United States) M Bauer (South Africa) B Talbot	6	2
(Russia) Y Kafelnikov (Czech Republic) D Vacek	7	6

Semifinals
8	(Spain) S Casal (Spain) E Sánchez	6	3
(Russia) Y Kafelnikov (Czech Republic) D Vacek	7	6

=== Bottom half ===
First round
5	(Sweden) S Edberg (Czech Republic) P Korda	3	6
(South Africa) G Muller (South Africa) D Visser	6	7
(United States) D Johnson (United States) F Montana	1	2
(Netherlands) R Krajicek (Netherlands) M Oosting	6	6
(South Africa) JL de Jager (South Africa) M Ondruska	6	6
(Spain) T Carbonell (Germany) CU Steeb	2	4
(Sweden) R Bergh (United States) G Van Emburgh	7	6
4	(United States) L Jensen (United States) M Jensen	5	1
7	(Sweden) J Apell (Sweden) H Holm	3	6	6
(Netherlands) M Koevermans (Czech Republic) D Rikl	6	3	1
WC	(France) G Forget (France) H Leconte	3	r
WC	(France) A Boetsch (France) O Delaître	6
(United States) S Melville (Australia) L Warder	3	6	5
Q	(Sweden) N Kulti (Sweden) M Larsson	6	3	7
(Sweden) P Nyborg (Belgium) L Pimek	6	6	6
2	(Netherlands) P Haarhuis (Australia) M Woodforde	4	7	7

Second round
(South Africa) G Muller (South Africa) D Visser	7	6
(Netherlands) R Krajicek (Netherlands) M Oosting	6	4
(South Africa) JL de Jager (South Africa) M Ondruska	7	6
(Sweden) R Bergh (United States) G Van Emburgh	6	4
7	(Sweden) J Apell (Sweden) H Holm	1	7	3
WC	(France) A Boetsch (France) O Delaître	6	6	6
Q	(Sweden) N Kulti (Sweden) M Larsson	3	7	6
2	(Netherlands) P Haarhuis (Australia) M Woodforde	6	6	2

Quarterfinals
(South Africa) G Muller (South Africa) D Visser	6	7	5
(South Africa) JL de Jager (South Africa) M Ondruska	7	6	7
WC	(France) A Boetsch (France) O Delaître	4	5
Q	(Sweden) N Kulti (Sweden) M Larsson	6	7

Semifinals
(South Africa) JL de Jager (South Africa) M Ondruska	0	2
Q	(Sweden) N Kulti (Sweden) M Larsson	6	6
