= 1993 Monte Carlo Open =

- Date: 19–25 April
- Edition: 87th
- Category: ATP Championship Series, Single-Week
- Draw: 64S / 32D
- Prize money: $1,400,000
- Surface: Clay / outdoor
- Location: Roquebrune-Cap-Martin, France
- Venue: Monte Carlo Country Club

Champions

Singles
- (Spain) Sergi Bruguera

Doubles
- (Sweden) Stefan Edberg / (Czech Republic) Petr Korda
- Monte Carlo Open

The 1993 Monte Carlo Open was a men's tennis tournament played on outdoor clay courts. It was the 87th edition of the Monte Carlo Open, and was part of the ATP Championship Series, Single-Week of the 1993 ATP Tour. It took place at the Monte Carlo Country Club in Roquebrune-Cap-Martin, France, near Monte Carlo, Monaco, from 19 April through 25 April 1993.

== Review ==
Sergi Bruguera won his first title of the year. The Spaniard, 11th seed, defeated French rising star Cédric Pioline in straight sets in 97 minutes.

The top 2 players in the world, Jim Courier and Pete Sampras, were absent from the tournament. Only four seeds failed to win their first round matches: Fabrice Santoro, Henrik Holm, Karel Nováček, and Arnaud Boetsch. The top eight players all received byes into round two. The highest seeded player not to make it into the third round was second seed Boris Becker. He was defeated by Swiss player Marc Rosset. Other casualties in the second round were Guy Forget, Michael Stich, and Goran Ivanišević

In the third round, only one seed, Petr Korda, lost to an unseeded player; however, seeded players Richard Krajicek and Ivan Lendl lost to fellow seeds Andrei Medvedev and Sergi Bruguera respectively. A qualifier managed to advance to the final eight. The quarter final draw was:

- Stefan Edberg [1] vs Andrei Medvedev [7]
- Cédric Pioline vs Jonas Svensson [WC]
- Sergi Bruguera v vs Carlos Costa [14]
- Thomas Muster [8] vs Àlex Corretja [Q]

Stefan Edberg, Cédric Pioline, and Thomas Muster all eased through into the semifinals. However, the other match lasted a little longer, as Sergi Bruguera defeated Carlos Costa.

In the semifinals, Pioline defeated Edberg in straight sets, while Bruguera saved matchpoints to defeat Muster. After over an hour and a half of tennis however, Bruguera was victorious defeating the Frenchman in straights.

Bruguera won his second title at Monte Carlo in three years, and was his final win in a Masters final.

== Finals ==
=== Singles ===
(Spain) Sergi Bruguera defeated (France) Cédric Pioline, 7–6^{(7–2)}, 6–0

- It was Bruguera's 1st singles title of the year and the 7th of his career.

=== Doubles ===
(Sweden) Stefan Edberg / (Czech Republic) Petr Korda defeated (Netherlands) Paul Haarhuis / (Netherlands) Mark Koevermans, 3–6, 6–2, 7–6
