= 1992 Monte Carlo Open =

Tennis tournament

- Date: 20–26 April
- Edition: 86th
- Category: ATP Championship Series, Single-Week
- Draw: 64S / 32D
- Prize money: $1,020,000
- Surface: Clay / outdoor
- Location: Roquebrune-Cap-Martin, France
- Venue: Monte Carlo Country Club

Champions

Singles
- (Austria) Thomas Muster

Doubles
- (Germany) Boris Becker / (Germany) Michael Stich
- Monte Carlo Open

The 1992 Monte Carlo Open was a men's tennis tournament played on outdoor clay courts. It was the 86th edition of the Monte Carlo Open, and was part of the ATP Championship Series, Single-Week of the 1992 ATP Tour. It took place at the Monte Carlo Country Club in Roquebrune-Cap-Martin, France, near Monte Carlo, Monaco, from 20 April through 26 April 1992. Unseeded Thomas Muster won the singles title.

== Finals ==
=== Singles ===
(Austria) Thomas Muster defeated (United States) Aaron Krickstein, 6–3, 6–1, 6–3

- It was Muster's 1st singles title of the year, and his 11th overall. It was his 1st Masters title of the year, and his 2nd overall.

=== Doubles ===
(Germany) 'Boris Becker / (Germany) Michael Stich defeated (Czechoslovakia) Petr Korda / (Czechoslovakia) Karel Nováček, 6–4, 6–4
