= 1993 Newsweek Champions Cup – Singles =

Singles
- 1993 Newsweek Champions Cup and the Matrix Essentials Evert Cup

Final
- Champion: (United States) Jim Courier
- Runner-up: (South Africa) Wayne Ferreira
- Score: 6–3, 6–3, 6–1

Details
- Draw: 56 (3WC/7Q/1LL)
- Seeds: 16

Events
Singles	men	women
Doubles	men	women
← 1992 ·	Newsweek Champions Cup	· 1994 →
← 1992 ·	Matrix Essentials Evert Cup	· 1994 →

Jim Courier defeated Wayne Ferreira in the final, 6–3, 6–3, 6–1 to win the men's singles tennis title at the 1993 Indian Wells Masters.

Michael Chang was the defending champion, but lost to Courier in the semifinals.

== Seeds ==
The top eight seeds receive a bye into the second round.

1. (United States) Jim Courier (champion)
2. (United States) Pete Sampras (third round)
3. (Sweden) Stefan Edberg (second round)
4. (United States) Michael Chang (semifinals)
5. (Czech Republic) Petr Korda (quarterfinals)
6. (Croatia) Goran Ivanišević (second round)
7. (United States) Andre Agassi (second round)
8. (Germany) Michael Stich (second round)
9. (Spain) Sergi Bruguera (first round)
10. (Spain) Carlos Costa (first round)
11. (France) Guy Forget (first round)
12. (Austria) Thomas Muster (third round)
13. (United States) MaliVai Washington (third round)
14. (South Africa) Wayne Ferreira (finalist)
15. (Russia) Alexander Volkov (semifinals)
16. (France) Arnaud Boetsch (second round)

== Draw ==
=== Key ===
- Q = Qualifier
- WC = Wild card
- LL = Lucky loser
- Alt = Alternate
- ITF = ITF entry
- PR = Protected ranking
- SR = Special ranking
- SE = Special exempt
- JE = Junior exempt
- JR = Junior Accelerator Programme entrant
- CO = College Accelerator Programme entrant
- NG = Next Gen Accelerator Program entrant
- w/o = Walkover
- r = Retired
- d = Defaulted

=== Finals ===
Quarterfinals
1	(United States) Jim Courier	6	6^{3}	6
(Switzerland) Marc Rosset	3	7^{7}	3
4	(United States) Michael Chang	6	6
5	(Czech Republic) Petr Korda	1	3
(Argentina) Alberto Mancini	4	6^{2}
14	(South Africa) Wayne Ferreira	6	7^{7}
(France) Fabrice Santoro	4	1
15	(Russia) Alexander Volkov	6	6

Semifinals
1	(United States) Jim Courier	6	6
4	(United States) Michael Chang	4	4
14	(South Africa) Wayne Ferreira	7^{7}	6
15	(Russia) Alexander Volkov	6^{3}	3

Final
1	(United States) Jim Courier	6	6	6
14	(South Africa) Wayne Ferreira	3	3	1

=== Section 1 ===
First round
Q	(United States) A O'Brien	1	5
(United States) D Wheaton	6	7
WC	(United States) T Martin	7^{7}	6
WC	(Zimbabwe) B Black	6^{3}	0
(Uruguay) M Filippini	2	6	3
16	(France) A Boetsch	6	3	6
9	(Spain) S Bruguera	7^{7}	2	6^{4}
(United States) B Gilbert	6^{3}	6	7^{7}
(Italy) R Furlan	3	4
WC	(United States) J Palmer	6	6
LL	(Uruguay) D Perez	6	2	0
(Switzerland) M Rosset	3	6	6

Second round
1	(United States) J Courier	6	7^{7}
(United States) D Wheaton	3	6^{5}
WC	(United States) T Martin	6	5	7^{10}
16	(France) A Boetsch	4	7	6^{8}
(United States) B Gilbert	6^{3}	6	7^{9}
WC	(United States) J Palmer	7^{7}	4	6^{7}
(Switzerland) M Rosset	3	7^{7}	6
7	(United States) A Agassi	6	6^{5}	4

Third round
1	(United States) J Courier	7	6
WC	(United States) T Martin	5	2
(United States) B Gilbert	4	2
(Switzerland) M Rosset	6	6

Quarterfinals
1	(United States) J Courier	6	6^{3}	6
(Switzerland) M Rosset	3	7^{7}	3

=== Section 2 ===
First round
Q	(United States) J Stark	6	5	6
(Russia) A Chesnokov	0	7	3
(France) C Pioline	7^{7}	6^{3}	5
(Switzerland) J Hlasek	6^{2}	7^{7}	7
Q	(Australia) P Rafter	5	5
13	(United States) M Washington	7	7
12	(Austria) T Muster	6	6
(Brazil) J Oncins	4	0
(Mexico) L Herrera	0	5
Q	(South Africa) G Stafford	6	7
(Argentina) G Markus	3	2
(Spain) F Clavet	6	6

Second round
4	(United States) M Chang	6	6
Q	(United States) J Stark	4	4
(Switzerland) J Hlasek	2	2
13	(United States) M Washington	6	6
12	(Austria) T Muster	6	6
Q	(South Africa) G Stafford	4	4
(Spain) F Clavet	3	6^{3}
5	(Czech Republic) P Korda	6	7^{7}

Third round
4	(United States) M Chang	6^{4}	6	6
13	(United States) M Washington	7^{7}	3	1
12	(Austria) T Muster	6^{3}	4
5	(Czech Republic) P Korda	7^{7}	6

Quarterfinals
4	(United States) M Chang	6	6
5	(Czech Republic) P Korda	1	3

=== Section 3 ===
First round
(Spain) J Sánchez	2	6	6^{5}
(Argentina) A Mancini	6	2	7^{7}
(France) H Leconte	6	5	2
WC	(Australia) J Stoltenberg	1	7	6
(United States) J Grabb	7^{7}	6
11	(France) G Forget	6^{5}	3
14	(South Africa) W Ferreira	6	6
(Russia) A Cherkasov	1	1
(Spain) E Sánchez	6	6
Q	(Canada) G Rusedski	4	4
(Spain) J Arrese	5	5
WC	(United States) R Reneberg	7	7

Second round
6	(Croatia) G Ivanišević	3	2
(Argentina) A Mancini	6	6
WC	(Australia) J Stoltenberg	3	2
(United States) J Grabb	6	6
14	(South Africa) W Ferreira	6^{2}	7^{7}	7
(Spain) E Sánchez	7^{7}	6^{1}	5
WC	(United States) R Reneberg	6	4	6
3	(Sweden) S Edberg	3	6	4

Third round
(Argentina) A Mancini	6	3	7
(United States) J Grabb	4	6	5
14	(South Africa) W Ferreira	6	7
WC	(United States) R Reneberg	3	5

Quarterfinals
(Argentina) A Mancini	4	6^{2}
14	(South Africa) W Ferreira	6	7^{7}

=== Section 4 ===
First round
(United States) J Tarango	2	6	3
(France) F Santoro	6	0	6
(Italy) S Pescosolido	7	3	1
(Peru) J Yzaga	5	6	6
(Germany) B Karbacher	4	7^{7}	6
10	(Spain) C Costa	6	6^{3}	2
15	(Russia) A Volkov	1	6	7
(Australia) W Masur	6	2	5
(Germany) CU Steeb	6	3	7^{7}
Q	(Spain) T Carbonell	0	6	6^{5}
Q	(United States) R Weiss	3	4
(Brazil) L Mattar	6	6

Second round
8	(Germany) M Stich	6	6^{7}	6^{5}
(France) F Santoro	3	7^{9}	7^{7}
(Peru) J Yzaga	6	2	6
(Germany) B Karbacher	2	6	3
15	(Russia) A Volkov	2	7	6
(Germany) CU Steeb	6	5	3
(Brazil) L Mattar	4	4
2	(United States) P Sampras	6	6

Third round
(France) F Santoro	6	6
(Peru) J Yzaga	2	3
15	(Russia) A Volkov	7	6
2	(United States) P Sampras	5	4

Quarterfinals
(France) F Santoro	4	1
15	(Russia) A Volkov	6	6

== Qualifying ==
=== Qualifying seeds ===
1. (United States) Derrick Rostagno (first round)
2. (Sweden) Thomas Enqvist (First round, retired)
3. (United States) Jonathan Stark (qualified)
4. (France) Rodolphe Gilbert (first round)
5. (Spain) [Tomás Carbonell (qualified)
6. (United States) Chuck Adams (first round)
7. (United States) Todd Witsken (first round)
8. (United States) Robbie Weiss (qualified)
9. (United States) Alex O'Brien (qualified)
10. (Germany) Markus Naewie (second round)
11. (Australia) Simon Youl (second round)
12. (South Africa) Christo van Rensburg (first round)
13. (Uruguay) Diego Pérez (Qualifying competition, Lucky Loser)
14. (Canada) Andrew Sznajder (first round)

=== Qualifiers ===
1. (Canada) Greg Rusedski
2. (Australia) Patrick Rafter
3. (United States) Jonathan Stark
4. (South Africa) Grant Stafford
5. (Spain) Tomás Carbonell
6. (United States) Alex O'Brien
7. (United States) Robbie Weiss

=== Lucky loser ===
1. (Uruguay) Diego Pérez

=== Qualifying draw ===
==== First qualifier ====
First round
1	(United States) Derrick Rostagno	2	2
(United States) Patrick McEnroe	6	6
(France) Frédéric Fontang	3	0
(Canada) Greg Rusedski	6	6
(Brazil) Danilo Marcelino	4	1
(United States) Kent Kinnear	6	6
(Italy) Cristiano Caratti	5	3
13	(Uruguay) Diego Pérez	7	6

Second round
(United States) Patrick McEnroe	6	3	4
(Canada) Greg Rusedski	3	6	6
(United States) Kent Kinnear	1	5
13	(Uruguay) Diego Pérez	6	7

Qualifying competition
(Canada) Greg Rusedski	6	2	6
13	(Uruguay) Diego Pérez	2	6	3

==== Second qualifier ====
First round
2	(Sweden) Thomas Enqvist	0^{r}
(Australia) Patrick Rafter	5
(United States) Paul Annacone	7	4	2
WC	(United States) Brian Dunn	6	6	6
(Ukraine) Dimitri Poliakov	3	6	6
(Italy) Mario Visconti	6	1	7
(Russia) Yevgeny Kafelnikov	5	6	6
14	(Canada) Andrew Sznajder	7	2	3

Second round
(Australia) Patrick Rafter	6	6
WC	(United States) Brian Dunn	2	0
(Italy) Mario Visconti	6	2	4
(Russia) Yevgeny Kafelnikov	4	6	6

Qualifying competition
(Australia) Patrick Rafter	6	6
(Russia) Yevgeny Kafelnikov	2	1

==== Third qualifier ====
First round
3	(United States) Jonathan Stark	7	6
WC	(United States) Scott Davis	5	1
(United States) Kenny Thorne	6	3	6
(United States) Jimmy Arias	3	6	3
(United States) Steve Bryan	6	6
(South Africa) David Nainkin	4	2
(Australia) Neil Borwick	4	6	7
12	(South Africa) Christo van Rensburg	6	2	5

Second round
3	(United States) Jonathan Stark	6	6
(United States) Kenny Thorne	3	4
(United States) Steve Bryan	7	6
(Australia) Neil Borwick	6	3

Qualifying competition
3	(United States) Jonathan Stark	3	7	6
(United States) Steve Bryan	6	6	1

==== Fourth qualifier ====
First round
4	(France) Rodolphe Gilbert	6	3	5
(France) Thierry Guardiola	3	6	7
(Canada) Grant Connell	4	3
(Brazil) Fernando Roese	6	6
(South Africa) Grant Stafford	6	6
(Spain) Alejo Mancisidor	3	3
(Germany) Markus Zillner	3	2
11	(Australia) Simon Youl	6	6

Second round
(France) Thierry Guardiola	6	1	6
(Brazil) Fernando Roese	3	6	3
(South Africa) Grant Stafford	6	7
11	(Australia) Simon Youl	4	6

Qualifying competition
(France) Thierry Guardiola	4	3
(South Africa) Grant Stafford	6	6

==== Fifth qualifier ====
First round
5	(Spain) Tomás Carbonell	6	6
WC	(Sweden) Jan Gunnarsson	0	2
(Spain) Jordi Burillo	6	3	6
(Sweden) Mikael Pernfors	3	6	1
WC	(United States) Louis Gloria	6	7
(Brazil) Cássio Motta	2	6
(The Bahamas) Mark Knowles	3	2
10	(Germany) Markus Naewie	6	6

Second round
5	(Spain) Tomás Carbonell	6	6
(Spain) Jordi Burillo	1	1
WC	(United States) Louis Gloria	6	6
10	(Germany) Markus Naewie	1	2

Qualifying competition
5	(Spain) Tomás Carbonell	6	6
WC	(United States) Louis Gloria	1	2

==== Sixth qualifier ====
First round
6	(United States) Chuck Adams	4	6	4
(Italy) Francesco Michelotti	6	3	6
(Brazil) Fernando Meligeni	6	1	6
WC	(United States) Brian MacPhie	3	6	3
WC	(United States) Rick Leach	7	6
(France) Lionel Roux	6	2
(Canada) Daniel Nestor	6	2	1
8	(United States) Alex O'Brien	4	6	6

Second round
(Italy) Francesco Michelotti	4	4
(Brazil) Fernando Meligeni	6	6
WC	(United States) Rick Leach	7	3	4
8	(United States) Alex O'Brien	5	6	6

Qualifying competition
(Brazil) Fernando Meligeni	4	6
8	(United States) Alex O'Brien	6	7

==== Seventh qualifier ====
First round
7	(United States) Todd Witsken	3	4
(Venezuela) Maurice Ruah	6	6
(United States) David Witt	0	2
(The Bahamas) Roger Smith	6	6
(Germany) Michael Geserer	3	5
(Spain) Juan Gisbert Schultze	6	7
(Sweden) David Engel	2	6
9	(United States) Robbie Weiss	6	7

Second round
(Venezuela) Maurice Ruah	4	3
(The Bahamas) Roger Smith	6	6
(Spain) Juan Gisbert Schultze	4	6	4
9	(United States) Robbie Weiss	6	3	6

Qualifying competition
(The Bahamas) Roger Smith	3	0
9	(United States) Robbie Weiss	6	6
