= 1985 Player's Canadian Open – Women's singles =

Women's singles
- 1985 Player's Canadian Open

Final
- Champion: (United States) Chris Evert Lloyd
- Runner-up: (West Germany) Claudia Kohde-Kilsch
- Score: 6–2, 6–4

Details
- Draw: 56 (5Q/3LL)
- Seeds: 16

Events
Singles	men	women
Doubles	men	women
← 1984 ·	Canadian Open	· 1986 →

Chris Evert Lloyd successfully defended her title, by defeating Claudia Kohde-Kilsch 6–2, 6–4 in the final.

== Seeds ==
The first eight seeds received a bye into the second round.

1. (United States) Chris Evert Lloyd (champion)
2. (United States) Martina Navratilova (quarterfinals)
3. (Czechoslovakia) Hana Mandlíková (semifinals)
4. (Czechoslovakia) Helena Suková (semifinals)
5. (West Germany) Claudia Kohde-Kilsch (final)
6. (Australia) Wendy Turnbull (second round)
7. (Argentina) Gabriela Sabatini (quarterfinals)
8. (Canada) Carling Bassett (quarterfinals)
9. (n/a)
10. (West Germany) Bettina Bunge (second round)
11. (West Germany) Sylvia Hanika (third round)
12. (Hungary) Andrea Temesvári (third round)
13. (United States) Gigi Fernández (first round)
14. (United States) Michelle Torres (first round, retired)
15. (n/a)
16. (n/a)

== Draw ==
=== Key ===
- Q = Qualifier
- WC = Wild card
- LL = Lucky loser
- Alt = Alternate
- SE = Special exempt
- PR = Protected ranking
- ITF = ITF entry
- JE = Junior exempt
- w/o = Walkover
- r = Retired
- d = Defaulted
- SR = Special ranking

=== Finals ===
Quarterfinals
1	(United States) Chris Evert Lloyd	6	6
(United States) Molly Van Nostrand	2	1
3	(Czechoslovakia) Hana Mandlíková	6	6
7	(Argentina) Gabriela Sabatini	3	0
8	(Canada) Carling Bassett	1	1
4	(Czechoslovakia) Helena Suková	6	6
5	(West Germany) Claudia Kohde-Kilsch	3	6	6
2	(United States) Martina Navratilova	6	4	3

Semifinals
1	(United States) Chris Evert Lloyd	3	6	6
3	(Czechoslovakia) Hana Mandlíková	6	2	4
4	(Czechoslovakia) Helena Suková	4	4
5	(West Germany) Claudia Kohde-Kilsch	6	6

Final
1	(United States) Chris Evert Lloyd	6	6
5	(West Germany) Claudia Kohde-Kilsch	2	4

=== Top half ===
==== Section 1 ====
First round
Q	(United States) T Mochizuki	6	6
LL	(Czechoslovakia) M Skuherská	3	1
(Australia) E Smylie	6	4	6
(Canada) H Kelesi	3	6	3
(Argentina) A Villagrán	1	3
(France) P Paradis	6	6
(United States) E Burgin	6	6
(Japan) M Yanagi	1	2
(United States) G Kim	5	5
Q	(United States) K Kinney McDonald	7	7
(United Kingdom) J Durie	4	2
(United States) M Van Nostrand	6	6

Second round
1	(United States) C Evert Lloyd	6	6
Q	(United States) T Mochizuki	2	0
(Australia) E Smylie	6	6
(France) P Paradis	3	4
(United States) E Burgin	2	2
Q	(United States) K Kinney McDonald	6	6
(United States) M Van Nostrand	6	2	7
6	(Australia) W Turnbull	4	6	5

Third round
1	(United States) C Evert Lloyd	6	6
(Australia) E Smylie	1	1
Q	(United States) K Kinney McDonald	1	5
(United States) M Van Nostrand	6	7

Quarterfinals
1	(United States) C Evert Lloyd	6	6
(United States) M Van Nostrand	2	1

==== Section 2 ====
First round
(Czechoslovakia) R Maršíková	4	4
(South Africa) R Fairbank	6	6
(Italy) R Reggi	7	6
(United States) B Herr	5	4
(West Germany) E Pfaff	6	6
13	(United States) G Fernández	4	1
12	(Hungary) A Temesvári	7	6
(South Africa) R Uys	6	1
(United States) R Blount	4	6	6
LL	(West Germany) I Cueto	6	4	4
(United States) C Benjamin	4	4
(United States) LA Thompson	6	6

Second round
3	(Czechoslovakia) H Mandlíková	6	6
(South Africa) R Fairbank	3	3
(Italy) R Reggi	6	6
(West Germany) E Pfaff	3	1
12	(Hungary) A Temesvári	6	6
(United States) R Blount	2	2
(United States) LA Thompson	5	0
7	(Argentina) G Sabatini	7	6

Third round
3	(Czechoslovakia) H Mandlíková	6	6
(Italy) R Reggi	2	2
12	(Hungary) A Temesvári	6	4	1
7	(Argentina) G Sabatini	4	6	6

Quarterfinals
3	(Czechoslovakia) H Mandlíková	6	6
7	(Argentina) G Sabatini	3	0

=== Bottom half ===
==== Section 3 ====
First round
(United States) T Phelps	6	6
(United Kingdom) S Gomer	4	3
Q	(Argentina) M Paz	5	6	1
(Netherlands) M Mesker	7	2	6
(Canada) J Hetherington	6	4
10	(West Germany) B Bunge	7	6
14	(United States) M Torres	5	6	3^{r}
(United States) J Klitch	7	1	5
(Romania) V Ruzici	6	6
(United States) W White	1	3
(Soviet Union) L Savchenko	2	6	5
(Czechoslovakia) I Budařová	6	1	7

Second round
8	(Canada) C Bassett	6	2	6
(United States) T Phelps	0	6	3
(Netherlands) M Mesker	6	5	6
10	(West Germany) B Bunge	2	7	4
(United States) J Klitch	2	0
(Romania) V Ruzici	6	6
(Czechoslovakia) I Budařová	1	3
4	(Czechoslovakia) H Suková	6	6

Third round
8	(Canada) C Bassett	6	5	6
(Netherlands) M Mesker	3	7	4
(Romania) V Ruzici	1	5
4	(Czechoslovakia) H Suková	6	7

Quarterfinals
8	(Canada) C Bassett	1	1
4	(Czechoslovakia) H Suková	6	6

==== Section 4 ====
First round
(Australia) A Minter	2	3
(Socialist Federal Republic of Yugoslavia) S Goleš	6	6
Q	(Canada) M Blackwood	4	2
(Canada) J Young	6	6
LL	(United States) A Holton	3	1
11	(West Germany) S Hanika	6	6
(West Germany) M Schropp	7	6
(United States) P Barg	5	2
Q	(Hungary) C Bartos	1	0
(United States) V Nelson	6	6
(Denmark) T Scheuer-Larsen	4	5
(Japan) E Inoue	6	7

Second round
5	(West Germany) C Kohde-Kilsch	6	6
(Socialist Federal Republic of Yugoslavia) S Goleš	2	1
(Canada) J Young	3	3
11	(West Germany) S Hanika	6	6
(West Germany) M Schropp	0	0
(United States) V Nelson	6	6
(Japan) E Inoue	1	4
2	(United States) M Navratilova	6	6

Third round
5	(West Germany) C Kohde-Kilsch	6	6
11	(West Germany) S Hanika	1	1
(United States) V Nelson	1	0
2	(United States) M Navratilova	6	6

Quarterfinals
5	(West Germany) C Kohde-Kilsch	3	6	6
2	(United States) M Navratilova	6	4	3
