= 1985 Player's Canadian Open – Women's doubles =

Women's doubles
- 1985 Player's Canadian Open

Final
- Champions: (United States) Gigi Fernández (United States) Martina Navratilova
- Runners-up: (Netherlands) Marcella Mesker (France) Pascale Paradis
- Score: 6–4, 6–0

Details
- Draw: 32
- Seeds: 8

Events
Singles	men	women
Doubles	men	women
← 1984 ·	Canadian Open	· 1986 →

Kathy Jordan and Elizabeth Smylie were the defending champions, but none competed this year. Smylie opted to focus on the singles tournament.

Gigi Fernández and Martina Navratilova won the title by defeating Marcella Mesker and Pascale Paradis 6–4, 6–0 in the final.

== Seeds ==
1. (West Germany) Claudia Kohde-Kilsch / (Czechoslovakia) Helena Suková (quarterfinals)
2. (Czechoslovakia) Hana Mandlíková / (Australia) Wendy Turnbull (semifinals)
3. (United States) Gigi Fernández / (United States) Martina Navratilova (champions)
4. (West Germany) Bettina Bunge / (West Germany) Eva Pfaff (second round)
5. (n/a)
6. (Canada) Carling Bassett / (United States) Chris Evert Lloyd (first round)
7. (Romania) Virginia Ruzici / (Hungary) Andrea Temesvári (first round)
8. (United States) Elise Burgin / (United Kingdom) Jo Durie (second round)

== Draw ==
=== Key ===
- Q = Qualifier
- WC = Wild card
- LL = Lucky loser
- Alt = Alternate
- SE = Special exempt
- PR = Protected ranking
- ITF = ITF entry
- JE = Junior exempt
- w/o = Walkover
- r = Retired
- d = Defaulted
- SR = Special ranking

=== Finals ===
Semifinals
(United Kingdom) Annabel Croft (South Africa) Rene Uys	3	2
(Netherlands) Marcella Mesker (France) Pascale Paradis	6	6
3	(United States) Gigi Fernández (United States) Martina Navratilova	6	6
2	(Czechoslovakia) Hana Mandlíková (Australia) Wendy Turnbull	4	3

Final
(Netherlands) Marcella Mesker (France) Pascale Paradis	4	0
3	(United States) Gigi Fernández (United States) Martina Navratilova	6	6

=== Top half ===
First round
1	(West Germany) C Kohde-Kilsch (Czechoslovakia) H Suková	6	6
(Denmark) T Scheuer-Larsen (France) C Vanier	3	3
(United States) C Copeland (Japan) M Yanagi	6	7
(Hungary) C Bartos (France) MC Calleja	4	5
(Canada) K Dewis (Canada) W Pattenden	6	6
(United States) J Klitch (Czechoslovakia) R Maršíková	3	1
(United Kingdom) A Croft (South Africa) R Uys	6	6
(Argentina) B Fulco (Canada) H Kelesi	4	3
4	(West Germany) B Bunge (West Germany) E Pfaff	6	6
(Canada) M Blackwood (Australia) P Whytcross	1	1
(Canada) Sue Hatch (United States) Lynn Henderson	2	4
(South Africa) J Mundel (United States) M Van Nostrand	6	6
(United Kingdom) A Brown (United Kingdom) S Gomer	1	2
(Netherlands) M Mesker (France) P Paradis	6	6
(United States) R Blount (United States) G Purdy	4	4
8	(United States) E Burgin (United Kingdom) J Durie	6	6

Second round
1	(West Germany) C Kohde-Kilsch (Czechoslovakia) H Suková	6	6
(United States) C Copeland (Japan) M Yanagi	0	2
(Canada) K Dewis (Canada) W Pattenden	1	3
(United Kingdom) A Croft (South Africa) R Uys	6	6
4	(West Germany) B Bunge (West Germany) E Pfaff	4	6	1
(South Africa) J Mundel (United States) M Van Nostrand	6	4	6
(Netherlands) M Mesker (France) P Paradis	2	7	6
8	(United States) E Burgin (United Kingdom) J Durie	6	6	4

Quarterfinals
1	(West Germany) C Kohde-Kilsch (Czechoslovakia) H Suková	4	2
(United Kingdom) A Croft (South Africa) R Uys	6	6
(South Africa) J Mundel (United States) M Van Nostrand	6	7	0
(Netherlands) M Mesker (France) P Paradis	7	6	6

Semifinals
(United Kingdom) A Croft (South Africa) R Uys	3	2
(Netherlands) M Mesker (France) P Paradis	6	6

=== Bottom half ===
First round
7	(Romania) V Ruzici (Hungary) A Temesvári	4	3
(United States) P Barg (United States) L Howell	6	6
(Socialist Federal Republic of Yugoslavia) S Goleš (West Germany) M Schropp	6	7
(Japan) E Inoue (Japan) K Okagawa	2	6
(Czechoslovakia) I Budařová (Soviet Union) L Savchenko	2	6	7
(Canada) J Hetherington (Canada) H Pelletier	6	3	5
(United States) A Holton (Italy) R Reggi	3	3
3	(United States) G Fernández (United States) M Navratilova	6	6
6	(Canada) C Bassett (United States) C Evert Lloyd	6	4	5
(Argentina) M Paz (Argentina) A Villagrán	3	6	7
(United States) B Herr (United States) T Phelps	6	6
(United States) T Mochizuki (United States) M Torres	1	0
(United States) V Nelson (Peru) P Vásquez	2	1
(Australia) A Minter (Australia) E Minter	6	6
(United States) K McDaniel (United States) W White	?	?
2	(Czechoslovakia) H Mandlíková (Australia) W Turnbull	?	?

Second round
(United States) P Barg (United States) L Howell	7	6
(Socialist Federal Republic of Yugoslavia) S Goleš (West Germany) M Schropp	5	2
(Czechoslovakia) I Budařová (Soviet Union) L Savchenko	4	3
3	(United States) G Fernández (United States) M Navratilova	6	6
(Argentina) M Paz (Argentina) A Villagrán	6	6
(United States) B Herr (United States) T Phelps	4	3
(Australia) A Minter (Australia) E Minter	4	0
2	(Czechoslovakia) H Mandlíková (Australia) W Turnbull	6	6

Quarterfinals
(United States) P Barg (United States) L Howell	2	4
3	(United States) G Fernández (United States) M Navratilova	6	6
(Argentina) M Paz (Argentina) A Villagrán	4	2
2	(Czechoslovakia) H Mandlíková (Australia) W Turnbull	6	6

Semifinals
3	(United States) G Fernández (United States) M Navratilova	6	6
2	(Czechoslovakia) H Mandlíková (Australia) W Turnbull	4	3
