= 1993 Newsweek Champions Cup – Doubles =

Doubles
- 1993 Newsweek Champions Cup and the Matrix Essentials Evert Cup

Final
- Champions: (France) Guy Forget (France) Henri Leconte
- Runners-up: (United States) Luke Jensen (United States) Scott Melville
- Score: 6–4, 7–5

Details
- Draw: 28 (4WC/2Q/1LL)
- Seeds: 8

Events
| Singles | men | women |
| Doubles | men | women |
- Indian Wells Open Indian Wells Open

Steve DeVries and David Macpherson were the defending champions, but lost in the first round to Shelby Cannon and Dave Randall.

Guy Forget and Henri Leconte won the title, defeating Luke Jensen and Scott Melville 6–4, 7–5 in the final.

== Seeds ==
The first four seeds received a bye to the second round.

1. (United States) Jim Grabb / (United States) Richey Reneberg (quarterfinals)
2. (Australia) Mark Kratzmann / (Australia) Wally Masur (semifinals)
3. (Australia) John Fitzgerald / (Germany) Michael Stich (second round)
4. (Switzerland) Jakob Hlasek / (Switzerland) Marc Rosset (second round)
5. (Canada) Grant Connell / (United States) Patrick Galbraith (second round)
6. (United States) Steve DeVries / (Australia) David Macpherson (first round)
7. (United States) Patrick McEnroe / (United States) Jonathan Stark (second round)
8. (United States) Kelly Jones / (United States) Rick Leach (first round)

== Draw ==
Key

- Q = Qualifier
- WC = Wild card
- LL = Lucky loser
- Alt = Alternate
- ITF = ITF entry
- PR = Protected ranking
- SR = Special ranking
- SE = Special exempt
- JE = Junior exempt
- JR = Junior Accelerator Programme entrant
- CO = College Accelerator Programme entrant
- NG = Next Gen Accelerator Program entrant
- w/o = Walkover
- r = Retired
- d = Defaulted

=== Finals ===
Semifinals
(United States) Mark Keil (South Africa) Stefan Kruger | 6 | 6 | 3
(United States) Luke Jensen (United States) Scott Melville | 4 | 7 | 6
WC | (France) Guy Forget (France) Henri Leconte | 6 | 6
2 | (Australia) Mark Kratzmann (Australia) Wally Masur | 4 | 4

Final
(United States) Luke Jensen (United States) Scott Melville | 4 | 5
WC | (France) Guy Forget (France) Henri Leconte | 6 | 7

=== Top half ===
First round
(Spain) S Casal (Spain) E Sánchez | 6 | 7 | 6
(South Africa) G Muller (Spain) J Sánchez | 7 | 6 | 4
(South Africa) W Ferreira (United States) T Witsken | 7 | 5 | 6
(Argentina) H de la Peña (Brazil) C Motta | 6 | 7 | 3
(United States) M Keil (South Africa) S Kruger | 6 | 7
8 | (United States) K Jones (United States) R Leach | 4 | 6
(United States) B Pearce (South Africa) B Talbot | 6 | 6
WC | (Australia) P Rafter (Australia) J Stoltenberg | 7 | 7
(United Kingdom) N Broad (South Africa) D Visser | 4 | 4
(United States) L Jensen (United States) S Melville | 6 | 6
(United States) S Cannon (United States) D Randall | 7 | 4 | 6
6 | (United States) S DeVries (Australia) D Macpherson | 6 | 6 | 1

Second round
1 | (United States) J Grabb (United States) R Reneberg | 7 | 6 | 6
(Spain) S Casal (Spain) E Sánchez | 6 | 7 | 4
(South Africa) W Ferreira (United States) T Witsken | 3 | 6
(United States) M Keil (South Africa) S Kruger | 6 | 7
4 | (Switzerland) J Hlasek (Switzerland) M Rosset | 1 | 6 | 2
WC | (Australia) P Rafter (Australia) J Stoltenberg | 6 | 1 | 6
(United States) L Jensen (United States) S Melville | 7 | 6
(United States) S Cannon (United States) D Randall | 6 | 3

Quarterfinals
1 | (United States) J Grabb (United States) R Reneberg | 7 | 5 | 4
(United States) M Keil (South Africa) S Kruger | 6 | 7 | 6
WC | (Australia) P Rafter (Australia) J Stoltenberg | 6 | 4
(United States) L Jensen (United States) S Melville | 7 | 6

Semifinals
(United States) M Keil (South Africa) S Kruger | 6 | 6 | 3
(United States) L Jensen (United States) S Melville | 4 | 7 | 6

=== Bottom half ===
First round
5 | (Canada) G Connell (United States) P Galbraith | 6 | 3 | 6
(Canada) G Michibata (United States) D Pate | 4 | 6 | 3
WC | (Sweden) Anders Eriksson (United States) T Phillips | 3 | 4
WC | (France) G Forget (France) H Leconte | 6 | 6
(United States) B Garnett (United States) J Palmer | 7 | 7
(United States) K Kinnear (United States) S Salumaa | 6 | 5
7 | (United States) P McEnroe (United States) J Stark | 7 | 6
Q | (United States) TJ Middleton (United States) K Thorne | 5 | 3
(United States) K Flach (United States) G Van Emburgh | 7 | 5 | 6
WC | (United States) S Davis (United States) D Rostagno | 6 | 7 | 3
LL | (South Africa) B Haygarth (United States) J Pugh | 6 | 6
Q | (Czech Republic) P Korda (Spain) T Carbonell | 4 | 1

Second round
5 | (Canada) G Connell (United States) P Galbraith | 6 | 3 | 4
WC | (France) G Forget (France) H Leconte | 3 | 6 | 6
(United States) B Garnett (United States) J Palmer | 6 | 3 | 7
3 | (Australia) J Fitzgerald (Germany) M Stich | 3 | 6 | 6
7 | (United States) P McEnroe (United States) J Stark | 3 | 3
(United States) K Flach (United States) G Van Emburgh | 6 | 6
LL | (South Africa) B Haygarth (United States) J Pugh | 6 | 6
2 | (Australia) M Kratzmann (Australia) W Masur | 7 | 7

Quarterfinals
WC | (France) G Forget (France) H Leconte | 4 | 6 | 7
(United States) B Garnett (United States) J Palmer | 6 | 2 | 6
(United States) K Flach (United States) G Van Emburgh | 6 | 4
2 | (Australia) M Kratzmann (Australia) W Masur | 7 | 6

Semifinals
WC | (France) G Forget (France) H Leconte | 6 | 6
2 | (Australia) M Kratzmann (Australia) W Masur | 4 | 4

== Qualifying ==
=== Qualifying seeds ===
1. (Australia) Neil Borwick / (Australia) Simon Youl (first round)
2. (South Africa) Brent Haygarth / (United States) Jim Pugh (qualifying competition, lucky losers)
3. (Spain) Tomás Carbonell / (Czech Republic) Petr Korda (qualified)
4. (United States) T. J. Middleton / (United States) Kenny Thorne (qualified)

=== Qualifiers ===
1. (United States) T. J. Middleton / (United States) Kenny Thorne
2. (Spain) Tomás Carbonell / (Czech Republic) Petr Korda

=== Lucky losers ===
1. (South Africa) Brent Haygarth / (United States) Jim Pugh

=== Qualifying draw ===
==== First qualifier ====
First round
1 | (Australia) Neil Borwick (Australia) Simon Youl | 5 | 6 | 4
(United States) Doug Eisenman (United States) Murphy Jensen | 7 | 3 | 6
WC | (United States) Paul Annacone (Ukraine) Dimitri Poliakov | 2 | 5
4 | (United States) T. J. Middleton (United States) Kenny Thorne | 6 | 7

Qualifying competition
(United States) Doug Eisenman (United States) Murphy Jensen | 4 | 4
4 | (United States) T. J. Middleton (United States) Kenny Thorne | 6 | 6

==== Second qualifier ====
First round
2 | (South Africa) Brent Haygarth (United States) Jim Pugh | 6 | 6
WC | (The Bahamas) Mark Knowles (United States) Alex O'Brien | 4 | 4
WC | (Uruguay) Diego Pérez (Venezuela) Maurice Ruah | 1 | 4
3 | (Spain) Tomás Carbonell (Czechoslovakia) Petr Korda | 6 | 6

Qualifying competition
2 | (South Africa) Brent Haygarth (United States) Jim Pugh | 3 | 2
3 | (Spain) Tomás Carbonell (Czechoslovakia) Petr Korda | 6 | 6
