= 1990 Virginia Slims of California – Doubles =

Doubles
- 1990 Virginia Slims of California

Final
- Champions: (United States) Meredith McGrath (United States) Anne Smith
- Runners-up: (South Africa) Rosalyn Fairbank-Nideffer (United States) Robin White
- Score: 2–6, 6–0, 6–4

Details
- Draw: 16
- Seeds: 4

Events
Singles	Doubles
← 1989 ·	Silicon Valley Classic	· 1991 →

Patty Fendick and Jill Hetherington were the defending champions, but Hetherington chose to compete at Nashville during the same week, losing in the quarterfinals. Fendick teamed up with Judith Wiesner and lost in the quarterfinals to Meredith McGrath and Anne Smith.

McGrath and Smith won the title by defeating Rosalyn Fairbank-Nideffer and Robin White 2–6, 6–0, 6–4 in the final.

== Seeds ==
1. (United States) Meredith McGrath / (United States) Anne Smith (champions)
2. (South Africa) Rosalyn Fairbank-Nideffer / (United States) Robin White (final)
3. (United States) Mary-Lou Daniels / (United States) Wendy White-Prausa (quarterfinals)
4. (Argentina) Mercedes Paz / (Hungary) Andrea Temesvári (quarterfinals)

== Draw ==
=== Key ===
- Q = Qualifier
- WC = Wild card
- LL = Lucky loser
- Alt = Alternate
- SE = Special exempt
- PR = Protected ranking
- ITF = ITF entry
- JE = Junior exempt
- w/o = Walkover
- r = Retired
- d = Defaulted
- SR = Special ranking

=== Draw ===
First round
1	(United States) M McGrath (United States) A Smith	6	6
(Argentina) F Labat (Argentina) P Tarabini	2	2
(United States) A Henricksson (United States) H Na	1	7^{7}	0
(United States) P Fendick (Austria) J Wiesner	6	6^{3}	6
4	(Argentina) M Paz (Hungary) A Temesvári	6	6
(United States) P Louie Harper (United States) P Barg-Mager	3	4
(United States) R Casals (United States) M Navratilova	6	6
(Peru) L Gildemeister (United States) J Smoller	4	1
(Sweden) M Lindström (United States) H Ludloff	3	2
(France) M Pierce (Czechoslovakia) R Zrubáková	6	6
(United States) A May (United States) M Werdel	2	1
3	(United States) ML Daniels (United States) W White-Prausa	6	6
(United States) Ca MacGregor (United States) Cy MacGregor	6	3	7^{7}
(Philippines) JM Lozano (United States) K May-Paben	3	6	6^{3}
(United States) A Frazier (Socialist Federal Republic of Yugoslavia) M Seles	6^{5}	2
2	(South Africa) R Fairbank-Nideffer (United States) R White	7^{7}	6

Quarterfinals
1	(United States) M McGrath (United States) A Smith	6	7^{7}
(United States) P Fendick (Austria) J Wiesner	2	6^{2}
4	(Argentina) M Paz (Hungary) A Temesvári	6	4	1
(United States) R Casals (United States) M Navratilova	4	6	6
(France) M Pierce (Czechoslovakia) R Zrubáková	6	6
3	(United States) ML Daniels (United States) W White-Prausa	4	3
(United States) Ca MacGregor (United States) Cy MacGregor	4	2
2	(South Africa) R Fairbank-Nideffer (United States) R White	6	6

Semifinals
1	(United States) M McGrath (United States) A Smith	6	6
(United States) R Casals (United States) M Navratilova	2	3
(France) M Pierce (Czechoslovakia) R Zrubáková	2	1
2	(South Africa) R Fairbank-Nideffer (United States) R White	6	6

Final
1	(United States) M McGrath (United States) A Smith	2	6	6
2	(South Africa) R Fairbank-Nideffer (United States) R White	6	0	4
