= 1992 Matrix Essentials Evert Cup – Doubles =

Doubles
- 1992 Matrix Essentials Evert Cup

Final
- Champions: (Germany) Claudia Kohde-Kilsch (United States) Stephanie Rehe
- Runners-up: (Canada) Jill Hetherington (United States) Kathy Rinaldi
- Score: 6–3, 6–3

Events
Singles	Doubles
← 1991 ·	Matrix Essentials Evert Cup	· 1993 →

The women's doubles Tournament at the 1992 Matrix Essentials Evert Cup took place between February 24 and March 1 on the outdoor hard courts of the Indian Wells Tennis Garden in Indian Wells, United States. Claudia Kohde-Kilsch and Stephanie Rehe won the title, defeating Jill Hetherington and Kathy Rinaldi in the final.

== Seeds ==
1. (United States) Gigi Fernández / (United States) Robin White (second round)
2. (United States) Sandy Collins / (South Africa) Elna Reinach (semifinals)
3. (Canada) Jill Hetherington / (United States) Kathy Rinaldi (final)
4. (Germany) Claudia Kohde-Kilsch / (United States) Stephanie Rehe (champions)
5. (South Africa) Lise Gregory / (United States) Gretchen Magers (first round)
6. (France) Isabelle Demongeot / (Japan) Maya Kidowaki (quarterfinals)
7. (France) Nathalie Tauziat / (Austria) Judith Wiesner (first round)
8. (Netherlands) Manon Bollegraf / (Netherlands) Caroline Vis (second round)

== Draw ==
=== Key ===
- Q = Qualifier
- WC = Wild card
- LL = Lucky loser
- Alt = Alternate
- SE = Special exempt
- PR = Protected ranking
- ITF = ITF entry
- JE = Junior exempt
- w/o = Walkover
- r = Retired
- d = Defaulted
- SR = Special ranking

=== Finals ===
Semifinals				Final
	(United Kingdom) Jo Durie (Australia) Nicole Provis	2	4
3	(Canada) Jill Hetherington (United States) Kathy Rinaldi	6	6	3	(Canada) Jill Hetherington (United States) Kathy Rinaldi	3	3
4	(Germany) Claudia Kohde-Kilsch (United States) Stephanie Rehe	6	6	4	(Germany) Claudia Kohde-Kilsch (United States) Stephanie Rehe	6	6
2	(United States) Sandy Collins (South Africa) Elna Reinach	4	4

=== Top half ===
First round
(United Kingdom) J Durie (Australia) N Provis	7	6
(United States) A Frazier (Japan) R Hiraki	6^{8}	4
(France) A Dechaume (France) N van Lottum	6	5	6
(United States) D Graham (United States) G Helgeson	1	7	2
(Australia) KA Guse (Japan) A Kijimuta	2	2
8	(Netherlands) M Bollegraf (Netherlands) C Vis	6	6
(United States) ML Daniels (South Africa) R Fairbank-Nideffer	3	6	6
(Indonesia) Y Basuki (Japan) N Miyagi	6	3	0
(Sweden) C Lindqvist (Sweden) M Lindström	6	2	6
(United States) A Keller (United States) K Po	0	6	3
Q	(United States) J Emmons (United States) A Henricksson	4	3
6	(France) I Demongeot (Japan) M Kidowaki	6	6

Quarterfinals
1	(United States) G Fernández (United States) R White	5	0
(United Kingdom) J Durie (Australia) N Provis	7	6
(France) A Dechaume (France) N van Lottum	6	4	7
8	(Netherlands) M Bollegraf (Netherlands) C Vis	4	6	6^{2}
3	(Canada) J Hetherington (United States) K Rinaldi	6	6
(United States) ML Daniels (South Africa) R Fairbank-Nideffer	1	4
(Sweden) C Lindqvist (Sweden) M Lindström	1	6	3
6	(France) I Demongeot (Japan) M Kidowaki	6	2	6

Semifinals
(United Kingdom) J Durie (Australia) N Provis	6	6
(France) A Dechaume (France) N van Lottum	4	2
3	(Canada) J Hetherington (United States) K Rinaldi	6	6
6	(France) I Demongeot (Japan) M Kidowaki	2	4

Final
(United Kingdom) J Durie (Australia) N Provis	5	1
3	(Canada) J Hetherington (United States) K Rinaldi	7	6

=== Bottom half ===
First round
7	(France) N Tauziat (Austria) J Wiesner	5	6	4
Q	(United States) E Burgin (South Africa) M de Swardt	7	3	6
(United States) L Harvey-Wild (United States) M Werdel	4	6^{6}
(United States) M Harper (United States) Ca MacGregor	6	7
(United States) H Ludloff (United States) T Whitlinger	6	7
WC	(United States) S Sloane-Lundy (United States) J Smoller	2	5
5	(South Africa) L Gregory (United States) G Magers	4	6	1
(Australia) K Godridge (United States) A Grossman	6	4	6
(Bulgaria) K Maleeva (Australia) R Stubbs	4	6	6
WC	(United States) N London (United States) P Nelson	6	2	4
(Canada) R Simpson-Alter (Canada) H Kelesi	1	3
(United States) C Benjamin (United Kingdom) C Wood	6	6

Quarterfinals
Q	(United States) E Burgin (South Africa) M de Swardt	7	5	6
(United States) M Harper (United States) Ca MacGregor	5	7	3
(United States) H Ludloff (United States) T Whitlinger	1	1
4	(Germany) C Kohde-Kilsch (United States) S Rehe	6	6
(Australia) K Godridge (United States) A Grossman	6	5	1
(Bulgaria) K Maleeva (Australia) R Stubbs	4	7	6
(United States) C Benjamin (United Kingdom) C Wood	6	4	2
2	(United States) S Collins (South Africa) E Reinach	3	6	6

Semifinals
Q	(United States) E Burgin (South Africa) M de Swardt	3	0
4	(Germany) C Kohde-Kilsch (United States) S Rehe	6	6
(Bulgaria) K Maleeva (Australia) R Stubbs	1	6	1
2	(United States) S Collins (South Africa) E Reinach	6	4	6

Final
4	(Germany) C Kohde-Kilsch (United States) S Rehe	6	6
2	(United States) S Collins (South Africa) E Reinach	4	4
