= 1989 Virginia Slims of California =

- Date: February 20 – 26
- Edition: 18th
- Category: Category 4
- Draw: 32S / 16D
- Prize money: $250,000
- Surface: Hard / indoor
- Location: Oakland, California, U.S.
- Venue: Oakland-Alameda County Coliseum Arena

Champions

Singles
- (United States) Zina Garrison

Doubles
- (United States) Patty Fendick / (Canada) Jill Hetherington
- Stanford Classic

The 1989 Virginia Slims of California was a women's tennis tournament played on indoor hard courts at the Oakland-Alameda County Coliseum Arena in Oakland, California in the United States and was part of Category 4 tier of the 1989 WTA Tour. The tournament ran from February 20 through February 26, 1989. Third-seeded Zina Garrison won the singles title.

== Finals ==
=== Singles ===
(United States) Zina Garrison defeated (Soviet Union) Larisa Savchenko 6–1, 6–1

- It was Garrison's 1st singles title of the year and the 7th of her career.

=== Doubles ===
(United States) Patty Fendick / (Canada) Jill Hetherington defeated (Soviet Union) Larisa Savchenko / (Soviet Union) Natasha Zvereva 7–5, 3–6, 6–2

- It was Fendick's 3rd title of the year and the 11th of her career. It was Hetherington's 2nd title of the year and the 9th of her career.
