= 1992 Matrix Essentials Evert Cup – Singles =

Singles
- 1992 Matrix Essentials Evert Cup

Final
- Champion: (Socialist Federal Republic of Yugoslavia) Monica Seles
- Runner-up: (Spain) Conchita Martínez
- Score: 6–3, 6–1

Details
- Draw: 56
- Seeds: 16

Events
Singles	Doubles
← 1991 ·	Matrix Essentials Evert Cup	· 1993 →

The singles Tournament at the Matrix Essentials Evert Cup took place between February 24 and March 1 on the outdoor hard courts of the Indian Wells Tennis Garden in Indian Wells, United States. Monica Seles won the title, defeating Conchita Martínez in the final.

== Seeds ==
1. (Socialist Federal Republic of Yugoslavia) Monica Seles (champion)
2. (United States) Martina Navratilova (withdrew before the tournament)
3. (Spain) Conchita Martínez (final)
4. (Bulgaria) Katerina Maleeva (semifinals)
5. (France) Nathalie Tauziat (quarterfinals)
6. (Austria) Judith Wiesner (quarterfinals)
7. (United States) Gigi Fernández (quarterfinals)
8. (United States) Amy Frazier (quarterfinals)
9. (Japan) Naoko Sawamatsu (withdrew before the tournament)
10. (United States) Pam Shriver (third round)
11. (Indonesia) Yayuk Basuki (first round)
12. (Australia) Nicole Provis (third round)
13. (United States) Debbie Graham (second round)
14. (Canada) Helen Kelesi (third round)
15. (Sweden) Catarina Lindqvist (second round)
16. (United States) Robin White (first round)

== Draw ==
=== Key ===
- Q = Qualifier
- WC = Wild card
- LL = Lucky loser
- Alt = Alternate
- ITF = ITF entry
- PR = Protected ranking
- SR = Special ranking
- SE = Special exempt
- JE = Junior exempt
- JR = Junior Accelerator Programme entrant
- CO = College Accelerator Programme entrant
- NG = Next Gen Accelerator Program entrant
- w/o = Walkover
- r = Retired
- d = Defaulted

=== Finals ===
Quarterfinals
1	(Socialist Federal Republic of Yugoslavia) Monica Seles	6	6
7	(United States) Gigi Fernández	0	0
4	(Bulgaria) Katerina Maleeva	4	6	7
5	(France) Nathalie Tauziat	6	4	5
6	(Austria) Judith Wiesner	3	1
3	(Spain) Conchita Martínez	6	6
8	(United States) Amy Frazier	4	7	4
(United States) Ann Grossman	6	5	6

Semifinals
1	(Socialist Federal Republic of Yugoslavia) Monica Seles	6	6
4	(Bulgaria) Katerina Maleeva	1	0
4	(Spain) Conchita Martínez	6	6
(United States) Ann Grossman	3	1

Finals
1	(Socialist Federal Republic of Yugoslavia) Monica Seles	6	6
4	(Spain) Conchita Martínez	3	1

=== Top half ===
==== Section 1 ====
First round
(South Africa) E Reinach	7	5	6
(United States) K Po	5	7	0
Q	(New Zealand) C Toleafoa	1	3
Q	(United States) J Watanabe	6	6
(United States) G Magers	3	1
(United States) T Whitlinger	6	6
16	(United States) R White	1	6	3
(United States) G Helgeson	6	1	6
WC	(United States) P Nelson	7	6
(Australia) K Godridge	6^{1}	1
Q	(United States) K Dreyer	6	1	7
(South Africa) M de Swardt	6	6^{8}

Second round
1	(Socialist Federal Republic of Yugoslavia) M Seles	6	6
(South Africa) E Reinach	1	1
Q	(United States) J Watanabe	6	1	5
9	(United States) T Whitlinger	2	6	7
(United States) G Helgeson	6	6
WC	(United States) P Nelson	1	3
Q	(United States) K Dreyer	3	0
7	(United States) G Fernández	6	6

Third Round
1	(Socialist Federal Republic of Yugoslavia) M Seles	6	6
9	(United States) T Whitlinger	2	3
(United States) G Helgeson	4	3
7	(United States) G Fernández	6	6

Quarterfinals
1	(Socialist Federal Republic of Yugoslavia) M Seles	6	6
7	(United States) G Fernández	0	0

==== Section 2 ====
First round
(Netherlands) P Kamstra	3	0
Q	(United States) J Emmons	6	6
(United States) A Henricksson	4	1
(South Africa) A Coetzer	6	6
Q	(Australia) R Stubbs	6	4	1
13	(United States) D Graham	3	6	6
11	(Indonesia) Y Basuki	6	6
(Japan) M Kidowaki	4	1
(France) A Dechaume	6	6
WC	(United States) N Hummel	3	1
(Canada) R Simpson-Alter	6	6
(Japan) R Hiraki	3	1

Second round
4	(Bulgaria) K Maleeva	6	6
Q	(United States) J Emmons	2	0
(South Africa) A Coetzer	4	6	6
13	(United States) D Graham	6	0	0
11	(Indonesia) Y Basuki	5	6	2
(France) A Dechaume	7	4	6
(Canada) R Simpson-Alter	1	2
5	(France) N Tauziat	6	6

Third Round
4	(Bulgaria) K Maleeva	6	6
(South Africa) A Coetzer	2	2
(France) A Dechaume	7	3	3
5	(France) N Tauziat	6^{6}	6	6

Quarterfinals
4	(Bulgaria) K Maleeva	4	6	7
5	(France) N Tauziat	6	4	5

=== Bottom half ===
==== Section 3 ====
First round
(France) N van Lottum	3	3
(South Africa) R Fairbank-Nideffer	6	6
(United Kingdom) J Durie	2	7	5
Q	(Mexico) A Gavaldón	6	6^{5}	7
(United States) A Keller	0	7	2
14	(Canada) H Kelesi	6	6^{4}	6
12	(Australia) N Provis	6	6
(France) I Demongeot	3	3
LL	(United States) Ca MacGregor	6	2	2
(United States) L Harvey-Wild	4	6	6
(United States) S Rehe	6	6
(United States) S Sloane-Lundy	1	1

Second round
6	(Austria) J Wiesner	6	6
(South Africa) R Fairbank-Nideffer	2	2
(Mexico) A Gavaldón	2	4
14	(Canada) H Kelesi	6	6
12	(Australia) N Provis	6^{8}	6	6
(United States) L Harvey-Wild	7	3	3
(United States) S Rehe	4	6^{3}
3	(Spain) C Martínez	6	7

Third Round
6	(Austria) J Wiesner	6	2	6^{3}
11	(Canada) H Kelesi	2	6	7
12	(Australia) N Provis	2	2
3	(Spain) C Martínez	6	6

Quarterfinals
6	(Austria) J Wiesner	3	1
3	(Spain) C Martínez	6	6

==== Section 4 ====
First round
Q	(United States) J Santrock	4	6	7
(United States) ML Daniels	6	2	6^{5}
LL	(United States) H Ludloff	6	3	5
(Germany) C Kohde-Kilsch	4	6	7
(United States) M Harper	4	1
10	(United States) P Shriver	6	6
15	(Sweden) C Lindqvist	6	2	6
(United Kingdom) M Javer	2	6	3
(Japan) A Kijimuta	6^{8}	0
(United States) A Grossman	6	6
(United States) K Rinaldi	6	0	6
Q	(United Kingdom) C Wood	4	6	1

Second round
8	(United States) A Frazier	2	7	6
Q	(United States) J Santrock	6	5	2
(Germany) C Kohde-Kilsch	3	7	3
10	(United States) P Shriver	6	5	6
15	(Sweden) C Lindqvist	2	4
(United States) A Grossman	6	6
(United States) K Rinaldi	6	7
LL	(Commonwealth of Independent States) V Milvidskaia	4	5

Third Round
8	(United States) A Frazier	6	6
10	(United States) P Shriver	2	3
(United States) A Grossman	6	7
(United States) K Rinaldi	1	5

Quarterfinals
8	(United States) A Frazier	4	7	4
(United States) A Grossman	6	5	6
