= 1989 Virginia Slims of California – Singles =

Singles
- 1989 Virginia Slims of California
- 1988 Champion: (United States) Martina Navratilova

Final
- Champion: (United States) Zina Garrison
- Runner-up: (Soviet Union) Larisa Savchenko
- Score: 6–1, 6–1

Details
- Draw: 32
- Seeds: 8

Events
Singles	Doubles
← 1988 ·	Virginia Slims of California	· 1990 →

Martina Navratilova was the defending champion of the singles event but lost in the semifinals of the 1989 Virginia Slims of California tennis tournament to Larisa Savchenko.

Zina Garrison won in the final 6–1, 6–1 against Savchenko.

== Seeds ==
A champion seed is indicated in bold text while text in italics indicates the round in which that seed was eliminated.

1. (United States) Martina Navratilova (semifinals)
2. (Soviet Union) Natasha Zvereva (semifinals)
3. (United States) **Zina Garrison (champion)**
4. (Soviet Union) Larisa Savchenko (final)
5. (United States) Patty Fendick (quarterfinals)
6. (South Africa) Elna Reinach (first round)
7. (France) Nathalie Tauziat (quarterfinals)
8. (South Africa) Rosalyn Fairbank (first round)

== Draw ==
=== Key ===
- Q = Qualifier
- WC = Wild card
- LL = Lucky loser
- Alt = Alternate
- SE = Special exempt
- PR = Protected ranking
- ITF = ITF entry
- JE = Junior exempt
- w/o = Walkover
- r = Retired
- d = Defaulted
- SR = Special ranking

First round
1	(United States) **M Navratilova**	**6**	**6**
(United States) K Rinaldi	1	2
(United States) R White	**6**	3	6
(France) **I Demongeot**	3	**6**	**7**
(United Kingdom) **M Javer**	1	**6**	**7**
(South Africa) D van Rensburg	**6**	4	6
(Australia) **J Byrne**	**6**	**7**
8	(South Africa) R Fairbank	4	6
4	(Soviet Union) **L Savchenko**	**7**	**6**
(United States) P Louie-Harper	5	2
(United States) H Ludloff	4	**7**	1
(Canada) **J Hetherington**	**6**	6	**6**
(United States) **M L Daniels**	4	**6**	**6**
(United States) A Ivan	**6**	1	3
(United States) A Henricksson	2	3
5	(United States) **P Fendick**	**6**	**6**
6	(South Africa) E Reinach	4	**7**	3
(United States) **G Magers**	**6**	6	**6**
(United States) **G Fernández**	**6**	**6**
(United States) K Steinmetz	1	3
(Czechoslovakia) **A Holíková**	**6**	2	**6**
(United States) L Green	4	**6**	4
(United States) E Burgin	1	1
3	(United States) **Z Garrison**	**6**	**6**
7	(France) **N Tauziat**	**6**	**6**
(United States) E Hakami	2	2
(West Germany) **E Pfaff**	**6**	**6**
(United States) A Grossman	3	0
(United States) B Herr	2	**6**	5
(United States) **K Adams**	**6**	2	**7**
(United States) C Benjamin	1	4
2	(Soviet Union) **N Zvereva**	**6**	**6**

Second round
1	(United States) **M Navratilova**	**6**	**6**
(France) I Demongeot	3	1
(United Kingdom) M Javer	3	4
(Australia) **J Byrne**	**6**	**6**
4	(Soviet Union) **L Savchenko**	**6**	**7**
(Canada) J Hetherington	3	5
(United States) M L Daniels	2	3
5	(United States) **P Fendick**	**6**	**6**
(United States) G Magers	3	4
(United States) **G Fernández**	**6**	**6**
(Czechoslovakia) A Holíková	0	1
3	(United States) **Z Garrison**	**6**	**6**
7	(France) **N Tauziat**	**6**	**6**
(West Germany) E Pfaff	2	4
(United States) K Adams	3	2
2	(Soviet Union) **N Zvereva**	**6**	**6**

Quarterfinals
1	(United States) **M Navratilova**	**6**	**6**
(Australia) J Byrne	1	4
4	(Soviet Union) **L Savchenko**	**6**	**6**
5	(United States) P Fendick	1	1
(United States) G Fernández	6	4
3	(United States) **Z Garrison**	**7**	**6**
7	(France) N Tauziat	2	6
2	(Soviet Union) **N Zvereva**	**6**	**7**

Semifinals
1	(United States) M Navratilova	1	4
4	(Soviet Union) **L Savchenko**	**6**	**6**
3	(United States) **Z Garrison**	**7**	**6**
2	(Soviet Union) N Zvereva	5	4

Final
4	(Soviet Union) Larisa Savchenko	1	1
3	(United States) **Zina Garrison**	**6**	**6**
