= 1985 Player's Canadian Open – Men's doubles =

Men's doubles
- 1985 Player's Canadian Open

Final
- Champions: (United States) Ken Flach (United States) Robert Seguso
- Runners-up: (Sweden) Stefan Edberg (Sweden) Anders Järryd
- Score: 5–7, 7–6, 6–3

Details
- Draw: 28
- Seeds: 8

Events
| Singles | men | women |
| Doubles | men | women |
- Canadian Open

Peter Fleming and John McEnroe were the defending champions, but McEnroe opted to focus on the singles tournament. Fleming teamed up with Tom Gullikson and lost in the quarterfinals to Stefan Edberg and Anders Järryd.

Ken Flach and Robert Seguso won the title by defeating Edberg and Järryd 5–7, 7–6, 6–3 in the final.

== Seeds ==
1. (United States) Ken Flach / (United States) Robert Seguso (champions)
2. (Switzerland) Heinz Günthardt / (Hungary) Balázs Taróczy (semifinals)
3. (Sweden) Stefan Edberg / (Sweden) Anders Järryd (final)
4. (Czechoslovakia) Pavel Složil / (Czechoslovakia) Tomáš Šmíd (semifinals)
5. (Australia) Mark Edmondson / (Australia) Kim Warwick (first round)
6. (Australia) John Fitzgerald / (Australia) Wally Masur (second round)
7. (United States) Paul Annacone / (South Africa) Christo van Rensburg (quarterfinals)
8. (United States) Kevin Curren / (United States) Johan Kriek (first round)

== Draw ==
Key

- Q = Qualifier
- WC = Wild card
- LL = Lucky loser
- Alt = Alternate
- ITF = ITF entry
- PR = Protected ranking
- SR = Special ranking
- SE = Special exempt
- JE = Junior exempt
- JR = Junior Accelerator Programme entrant
- CO = College Accelerator Programme entrant
- NG = Next Gen Accelerator Program entrant
- w/o = Walkover
- r = Retired
- d = Defaulted

=== Finals ===
Semifinals
1 | (United States) Ken Flach (United States) Robert Seguso | 6 | 7
4 | (Czechoslovakia) Pavel Složil (Czechoslovakia) Tomáš Šmíd | 4 | 6
3 | (Sweden) Stefan Edberg (Sweden) Anders Järryd | 7 | 6 | 6
2 | (Switzerland) Heinz Günthardt (Hungary) Balázs Taróczy | 6 | 7 | 3

Final
1 | (United States) Ken Flach (United States) Robert Seguso | 5 | 7 | 6
3 | (Sweden) Stefan Edberg (Sweden) Anders Järryd | 7 | 6 | 3

=== Top half ===
First round
(France) G Forget (Israel) S Perkiss | 4 | 6 | 6
(United States) B Manson (United States) R Van't Hof | 6 | 4 | 4
(United States) V Gerulaitis (United States) M Mitchell | 4 | 6 | 3
(United States) S Davis (United States) S Giammalva Jr. | 6 | 4 | 6
(South Africa) E Edwards (South Africa) D Visser | 2 | 6 | 7
8 | (United States) K Curren (United States) J Kriek | 6 | 3 | 5
(Canada) D Burke (Canada) M Greenan | 3 | 4
(Denmark) M Mortensen (United States) E Teltscher | 6 | 6
(Canada) L Dunlop (Canada) D Segal | 3 | 1
(India) A Amritraj (United States) A Kohlberg | 6 | 6
(United States) C Hooper (United States) M Leach | 6 | 7
5 | (Australia) M Edmondson (Australia) K Warwick | 4 | 6

Second round
1 | (United States) K Flach (United States) R Seguso | 7 | 6
(France) G Forget (Israel) S Perkiss | 5 | 3
(United States) S Davis (United States) S Giammalva Jr. | 3 | 5
(South Africa) E Edwards (South Africa) D Visser | 6 | 7
4 | (Czechoslovakia) P Slozil (Czechoslovakia) T Smid | 7 | 4 | 6
(Denmark) M Mortensen (United States) E Teltscher | 6 | 6 | 4
(India) A Amritraj (United States) A Kohlberg | 4 | 2
(United States) C Hooper (United States) M Leach | 6 | 6

Quarterfinals
1 | (United States) K Flach (United States) R Seguso | 6 | 6
(South Africa) E Edwards (South Africa) D Visser | 3 | 4
4 | (Czechoslovakia) P Slozil (Czechoslovakia) T Smid | 6 | 7
(United States) C Hooper (United States) M Leach | 4 | 5

Semifinals
1 | (United States) K Flach (United States) R Seguso | 6 | 7
4 | (Czechoslovakia) P Slozil (Czechoslovakia) T Smid | 4 | 6

=== Bottom half ===
First round
6 | (Australia) J Fitzgerald (Australia) W Masur | 7 | 7
(Paraguay) V Pecci (Federal Republic of Yugoslavia) S Živojinović | 5 | 5
(United States) P Fleming (United States) T Gullikson | 6 | 6
(India) V Amritraj (Australia) D Graham | 3 | 4
(United States) M De Palmer (United States) G Donnelly | 6 | 6
(New Zealand) K Evernden (South Africa) M Robertson | 3 | 4
7 | (United States) P Annacone (South Africa) C van Rensburg | 6 | 6
(Canada) S Bonneau (Canada) M Laurendeau | 3 | 4
(Switzerland) J Hlasek (United States) I Lendl | 7 | 7
(United States) R Knapp (United States) E Van't Hof | 6 | 6
(United States) C Cox (South Africa) C Honey | 3 | 7 | 6
(Australia) M Fancutt (United States) T Wilkison | 6 | 6 | 3

Second round
6 | (Australia) J Fitzgerald (Australia) W Masur | 4 | 4
(United States) P Fleming (United States) T Gullikson | 6 | 6
(United States) M De Palmer (United States) G Donnelly | 6 | 6 | 3
3 | (Sweden) S Edberg (Sweden) A Järryd | 7 | 4 | 6
7 | (United States) P Annacone (South Africa) C van Rensburg | 6 | 6
(Switzerland) J Hlasek (United States) I Lendl | 3 | 2
(United States) C Cox (South Africa) C Honey | 2 | 2
2 | (Switzerland) H Gunthardt (Hungary) B Taroczy | 6 | 6

Quarterfinals
(United States) P Fleming (United States) T Gullikson | 4 | 3
3 | (Sweden) S Edberg (Sweden) A Järryd | 6 | 6
7 | (United States) P Annacone (South Africa) C van Rensburg | 6 | 3
2 | (Switzerland) H Gunthardt (Hungary) B Taroczy | 7 | 6

Semifinals
3 | (Sweden) S Edberg (Sweden) A Järryd | 7 | 6 | 6
2 | (Switzerland) H Gunthardt (Hungary) B Taroczy | 6 | 7 | 3
