= 1985 Player's Canadian Open – Men's singles =

Men's singles
- 1985 Player's Canadian Open

Final
- Champion: (United States) John McEnroe
- Runner-up: (Czechoslovakia) Ivan Lendl
- Score: 7–5, 6–3

Details
- Draw: 56
- Seeds: 16

Events
Singles	men	women
Doubles	men	women
← 1984 ·	Player's Canadian Open	· 1986 →

John McEnroe was the defending champion.

McEnroe successfully defended his title, defeating Ivan Lendl 7–5, 6–3 in the final.

== Seeds ==
1. (United States) John McEnroe (champion)
2. (Czechoslovakia) Ivan Lendl (final)
3. (United States) Jimmy Connors (semifinals)
4. (United States) Kevin Curren (third round)
5. (Sweden) Anders Järryd (quarterfinals)
6. (Sweden) Stefan Edberg (quarterfinals)
7. (United States) Eliot Teltscher (quarterfinals)
8. (United States) Johan Kriek (third round)
9. (United States) Tim Mayotte (third round)
10. (United States) Scott Davis (first round)
11. (Sweden) Henrik Sundström (third round)
12. (Czechoslovakia) Tomáš Šmíd (first round)
13. (United States) Vitas Gerulaitis (third round)
14. (United States) Sammy Giammalva Jr. (third round)
15. (United States) Jimmy Arias (semifinals)
16. (India) Ramesh Krishnan (quarterfinals)

== Draw ==
=== Key ===
- Q = Qualifier
- WC = Wild card
- LL = Lucky loser
- Alt = Alternate
- SE = Special exempt
- PR = Protected ranking
- ITF = ITF entry
- JE = Junior exempt
- w/o = Walkover
- r = Retired
- d = Defaulted
- SR = Special ranking

=== Finals ===
Semifinals
1	(United States) John McEnroe	6	6
3	(United States) Jimmy Connors	2	3
15	(United States) Jimmy Arias	4	2
2	(Czechoslovakia) Ivan Lendl	6	6

Final
1	(United States) John McEnroe	7	6
2	(Czechoslovakia) Ivan Lendl	5	3

=== Top half ===
==== Section 1 ====
First round
Q	(Canada) G Connell	6	3
(United States) T Wilkison	7	6
(United States) M Mitchell	2	0
(Canada) M Wostenholme	6	6
Q	(Brazil) N Aerts	7	6
10	(United States) S Davis	6	2
16	(India) R Krishnan	3	6	6
(United States) B Green	6	3	1
(Switzerland) H Günthardt	6	4	6
(United States) M De Palmer	4	6	4
(United States) D Cassidy	3	5
Q	(South Africa) D Visser	6	7

Second round
1	(United States) J McEnroe	6	6
(United States) T Wilkison	2	4
(Canada) M Wostenholme	6	2
Q	(Brazil) N Aerts	7	6
16	(India) R Krishnan	5	7	6
(Switzerland) H Günthardt	7	6	2
Q	(South Africa) D Visser	6	0	6
8	(United States) J Kriek	3	6	7

Third round
1	(United States) J McEnroe	6	6
Q	(Brazil) N Aerts	0	1
16	(India) R Krishnan	6	6
8	(United States) J Kriek	4	4

Quarterfinals
1	(United States) J McEnroe	6	6
16	(India) R Krishnan	3	2

==== Section 2 ====
First round
(Czechoslovakia) P Složil	3	3
(Socialist Federal Republic of Yugoslavia) S Živojinović	6	6
(Israel) S Perkiss	4	7	6
(United States) T Gullikson	6	5	2
(Paraguay) V Pecci	3	6	2
13	(United States) V Gerulaitis	6	4	6
11	(Sweden) H Sundström	6	6
(Canada) D Segal	1	2
(United States) J Lapidus	6	6
(United States) K Flach	2	4
(United States) C Hooper	3	6	6
(United States) P Fleming	6	3	2

Second round
3	(United States) J Connors	7	6
(Socialist Federal Republic of Yugoslavia) S Živojinović	5	4
(Israel) S Perkiss	2	6
13	(United States) V Gerulaitis	6	7
11	(Sweden) H Sundström	6	6
(United States) J Lapidus	4	3
(United States) C Hooper	3	6	6
6	(Sweden) S Edberg	6	3	7

Third round
3	(United States) J Connors	6	6
13	(United States) V Gerulaitis	4	2
11	(Sweden) H Sundström	6	4
6	(Sweden) S Edberg	7	6

Quarterfinals
3	(United States) J Connors	6	6
6	(Sweden) S Edberg	4	1

==== Section 3 ====
First round
WC	(Canada) C Pridham	0	6
Q	(United States) J Canter	6	7
LL	(Sweden) T Högstedt	6	4	3
Q	(United States) A Kohlberg	3	6	6
(France) G Forget	6	6	4
14	(United States) S Giammalva Jr.	1	7	6
15	(United States) J Arias	7	3	6
(United States) B Scanlon	6	6	4
(United States) M Leach	7	4	6
(United States) J Sadri	6	6	2
(Australia) W Masur	7	6
(India) V Amritraj	6	2

Second round
7	(United States) E Teltscher	7	0	6
Q	(United States) J Canter	6	6	4
Q	(United States) A Kohlberg	6	6	2
14	(United States) S Giammalva Jr.	3	7	6
15	(United States) J Arias	6	7
(United States) M Leach	4	6
(Australia) W Masur	7	6	4
4	(United States) K Curren	6	7	6

Third round
7	(United States) E Teltscher	6	6
14	(United States) S Giammalva Jr.	4	4
15	(United States) J Arias	4	6	6
4	(United States) K Curren	6	3	2

Quarterfinals
7	(United States) E Teltscher	1	6
15	(United States) J Arias	6	7

==== Section 4 ====
First round
WC	(Canada) G Michibata	6	6
WC	(Canada) L Dunlop	3	4
(Switzerland) J Hlasek	6	5	6
(Australia) J Fitzgerald	2	7	4
WC	(Canada) S Bonneau	6	3	7
12	(Czechoslovakia) T Šmíd	3	6	5
9	(United States) T Mayotte	6	5	6
Q	(United States) S Denton	4	7	2
(France) T Benhabiles	4	4
Q	(United States) M Robertson	6	6
(United States) M Flur	3	6	6
(United States) P Annacone	6	4	4

Second round
5	(Sweden) A Järryd	6	6
WC	(Canada) G Michibata	1	2
(Switzerland) J Hlasek	1	6
WC	(Canada) S Bonneau	6	7
9	(United States) T Mayotte	6	7
Q	(United States) M Robertson	4	6
(United States) M Flur	2	2
2	(Czechoslovakia) I Lendl	6	6

Third round
5	(Sweden) A Järryd	6	6
WC	(Canada) S Bonneau	1	2
9	(United States) T Mayotte	6	2
2	(Czechoslovakia) I Lendl	7	6

Quarterfinals
5	(Sweden) A Järryd	1	0
2	(Czechoslovakia) I Lendl	6	6
