= 1993 Newsweek Champions Cup and the Matrix Essentials Evert Cup =

1993 Newsweek Champions Cup and Matrix Essentials Evert Cup
- Date: March 1–15 (ATP); February 22–28 (WTA)
- Edition: 20th
- Category: Super 9 (ATP); Tier II Series (WTA)
- Prize money: $1,400,000 (ATP) $375,000 (WTA)
- Surface: Hard / outdoor
- Location: Indian Wells, California, US
- Venue: Grand Champions Resort

Champions

Men's singles
- (United States) Jim Courier

Women's singles
- (United States) Mary Joe Fernández

Men's doubles
- (France) Guy Forget / (France) Henri Leconte

Women's doubles
- (Australia) Rennae Stubbs / (Czech Republic) Helena Suková
← 1992 ·	Newsweek Champions Cup	· 1994 →
← 1992 ·	Matrix Essentials Evert Cup	· 1994 →

The 1993 Newsweek Champions Cup and the Matrix Essentials Evert Cup was a combined men's and women's tennis tournaments played on outdoor hard courts. It was the 20th edition of the tournament, and was part of the ATP Super 9 of the 1993 ATP Tour and of the WTA Tier II Series of the 1993 WTA Tour. It was held from February 22 through February 28 (women) and March 1 to March 15, 1993 (men) at the Grand Champions Resort in Indian Wells, California in the United States.

The men singles was headlined by world No. 1 Jim Courier, Pete Sampras and Stefan Edberg. Other top seeds were Michael Chang, Petr Korda, Goran Ivanišević, Andre Agassi and Michael Stich.

The women's singles draw featured Mary Joe Fernández, Katerina Maleeva and Magdalena Maleeva as the top seeded players.

== Finals ==
=== Men's singles ===
(United States) Jim Courier defeated (South Africa) Wayne Ferreira 6–3, 6–3, 6–1

- It was Jim Courier's 3rd title of the year and his 12th overall. It was his 1st Masters title of the year and his 4th overall. It was also his 2nd title at the event after winning in 1991.

=== Women's singles ===
(United States) Mary Joe Fernández defeated (South Africa) Amanda Coetzer 3–6, 6–1, 7–6^{(8–6)}

- It was Mary Joe Fernadez 1st title of the year and her 3rd overall.

=== Men's doubles ===
(France) Guy Forget / (France) Henri Leconte defeated (United States) Luke Jensen / (United States) Scott Melville 6–4, 7–5

=== Women's doubles ===
(Australia) Rennae Stubbs / (Czech Republic) Helena Suková defeated (United States) Ann Grossman / (Canada) Patricia Hy 6–3, 6–4
