= 1990 Virginia Slims of California – Singles =

Singles
- 1990 Virginia Slims of California

Final
- Champion: (Socialist Federal Republic of Yugoslavia) Monica Seles
- Runner-up: (United States) Martina Navratilova
- Score: 6–3, 7–6^{(7–5)}

Details
- Draw: 28
- Seeds: 8

Events
Singles	Doubles
← 1989 ·	Silicon Valley Classic	· 1991 →

Zina Garrison was the defending champion, but lost in the semifinals to Monica Seles.

Seles won the title by defeating Martina Navratilova 6–3, 7–6^{(7–5)} in the final.

== Seeds ==
1. (United States) Martina Navratilova (final)
2. (Socialist Federal Republic of Yugoslavia) Monica Seles (champion)
3. (United States) Zina Garrison (semifinals)
4. (Austria) Barbara Paulus (second round)
5. (United States) Amy Frazier (second round)
6. (Austria) Judith Wiesner (second round)
7. (Peru) Laura Gildemeister (second round)
8. (United States) Anne Smith (second round)

== Draw ==
=== Key ===
- Q = Qualifier
- WC = Wild card
- LL = Lucky loser
- Alt = Alternate
- SE = Special exempt
- PR = Protected ranking
- ITF = ITF entry
- JE = Junior exempt
- w/o = Walkover
- r = Retired
- d = Defaulted
- SR = Special ranking

=== Finals ===
Semifinals
1	(United States) Martina Navratilova	6	6
(United States) Meredith McGrath	4	3
3	(United States) Zina Garrison	1	6	2
2	(Socialist Federal Republic of Yugoslavia) Monica Seles	6	3	6

Final
1	(United States) Martina Navratilova	3	6^{5}
2	(Socialist Federal Republic of Yugoslavia) Monica Seles	6	7^{7}

=== Top half ===
First round
(Argentina) P Tarabini	3	4
(United States) R White	6	6
(Czechoslovakia) R Zrubáková	6	6
(United States) D Faber	1	1
(United States) A Henricksson	6^{9}	4
6	(Austria) J Wiesner	7^{11}	6
(United States) M McGrath	6	7
(United States) S Martin	1	5
(United States) A May	6^{2}	5
(South Africa) R Fairbank-Nideffer	7^{7}	7
(United States) P Louie Harper	3	2
8	(United States) A Smith	6	6

Second round
1	(United States) M Navratilova	6	6
(United States) R White	2	3
(Czechoslovakia) R Zrubáková	6	6
6	(Austria) J Wiesner	2	1
4	(Austria) B Paulus	7^{7}	1	0
(United States) M McGrath	6^{4}	6	6
(South Africa) R Fairbank-Nideffer	7^{7}	6
8	(United States) A Smith	6^{5}	1

Quarterfinals
1	(United States) M Navratilova	6	6
(Czechoslovakia) R Zrubáková	2	0
(United States) M McGrath	6	4	6
(South Africa) R Fairbank-Nideffer	3	6	3

Semifinals
1	(United States) M Navratilova	6	6
(United States) M McGrath	4	3

=== Bottom half ===
First round
5	(United States) A Frazier	6	4	6
(United States) A Leand	0	6	2
(Argentina) M Paz	6	3	3
(United States) M Werdel	4	6	6
(United States) ML Daniels	3	6	6
(United Kingdom) M Javer	6	2	4
7	(Peru) L Gildemeister	7	6
(United States) P Fendick	5	0
(France) M Pierce	7^{7}	1	2
(United States) S Rehe	6^{5}	6	6
(Hungary) A Temesvári	6	6
(Argentina) F Labat	2	0

Second round
5	(United States) A Frazier	6^{4}	7^{7}	4
(United States) M Werdel	7^{7}	6^{4}	6
(United States) ML Daniels	2	5
3	(United States) Z Garrison	6	7
7	(Peru) L Gildemeister	4	4
(United States) S Rehe	6	6
(Hungary) A Temesvári	1	2
2	(Socialist Federal Republic of Yugoslavia) M Seles	6	6

Quarterfinals
(United States) M Werdel	7^{7}	1	2
3	(United States) Z Garrison	6^{3}	6	6
(United States) S Rehe	1	2
2	(Socialist Federal Republic of Yugoslavia) M Seles	6	6

Semifinals
3	(United States) Z Garrison	1	6	2
2	(Socialist Federal Republic of Yugoslavia) M Seles	6	3	6
