= 1988 Virginia Slims of California – Doubles =

Doubles
- 1988 Virginia Slims of California

Final
- Champions: (United States) Rosemary Casals (United States) Martina Navratilova
- Runners-up: (Australia) Hana Mandlíková (Czechoslovakia) Jana Novotná
- Score: 6–4, 6–4

Details
- Draw: 16
- Seeds: 4

Events
| Singles | Doubles |
| ← 1987 · | Virginia Slims of California | · 1989 → |

In the Doubles competition of the 1988 Virginia Slims of California tennis tournament, Hana Mandlíková and Wendy Turnbull were the defending champions but they competed with different partners: Mandlíková with Jana Novotná and Turnbull with Zina Garrison.

Garrison and Turnbull lost in the quarterfinals to Mary Joe Fernández and Terry Phelps.

Mandlíková and Novotná lost in the final 6–4, 6–4 to Rosemary Casals and Martina Navratilova.

== Seeds ==
Champion seeds are indicated in bold text while text in italics indicates the round in which those seeds were eliminated.

1. (United States) Zina Garrison / (Australia) Wendy Turnbull (quarterfinals)
2. (United States) Gigi Fernández / (United States) Lori McNeil (quarterfinals)
3. (United States) Elise Burgin / (United States) Robin White (quarterfinals)
4. (Australia) Hana Mandlíková / (Czechoslovakia) Jana Novotná (final)

== Draw ==
=== Key ===
- Q = Qualifier
- WC = Wild card
- LL = Lucky loser
- Alt = Alternate
- SE = Special exempt
- PR = Protected ranking
- ITF = ITF entry
- JE = Junior exempt
- w/o = Walkover
- r = Retired
- d = Defaulted
- SR = Special ranking

First round
1 | (United States) **Z Garrison** (Australia) **W Turnbull** | **6** | **6**
(Soviet Union) L Meskhi (Soviet Union) S Parkhomenko | 2 | 3
(United States) P Fendick (United States) S Walsh-Pete | 3 | 2
(United States) **M J Fernández** (United States) **T Phelps** | **6** | **6**
3 | (United States) **E Burgin** (United States) **R White** | **6** | **6**
(United States) K Adams (United States) A Henricksson | 3 | 3
(United States) **R Casals** (United States) **M Navratilova** | **6** | **6**
(United States) P Harper (United States) H Ludloff | 3 | 3
(United States) G Magers (United States) J Russell | 6 | 5
(United States) **A M Fernandez** (United States) **C MacGregor** | **7** | **7**
(South Africa) R Fairbank (United States) S Rehe | 4 | 6
4 | (Australia) **H Mandlíková** (Czechoslovakia) **J Novotná** | **6** | **7**
(United States) **L Antonoplis** (United States) **B Gerken** | **6** | **7**
(Soviet Union) L Savchenko (Soviet Union) N Zvereva | 4 | 5
(United States) C Benjamin (United States) W White | **6** | 3 | 1
2 | (United States) **G Fernández** (United States) **L McNeil** | 3 | **6** | **6**

Quarterfinals
1 | (United States) Z Garrison (Australia) W Turnbull | 3 | 6
(United States) **M J Fernández** (United States) **T Phelps** | **6** | **7**
3 | (United States) E Burgin (United States) R White | 4 | 2
(United States) **R Casals** (United States) **M Navratilova** | **6** | **6**
(United States) A M Fernandez (United States) C MacGregor | 3 | 3
4 | (Australia) **H Mandlíková** (Czechoslovakia) **J Novotná** | **6** | **6**
(United States) **L Antonoplis** (United States) **B Gerken** | **6** | **6**
2 | (United States) G Fernández (United States) L McNeil | 2 | 3

Semifinals
(United States) M J Fernández (United States) T Phelps | 3 | 4
(United States) **R Casals** (United States) **M Navratilova** | **6** | **6**
4 | (Australia) **H Mandlíková** (Czechoslovakia) **J Novotná** | **6** | **7**
(United States) L Antonoplis (United States) B Gerken | 3 | 5

Final
(United States) **Rosemary Casals** (United States) **Martina Navratilova** | **6** | **6**
4 | (Australia) Hana Mandlíková (Czechoslovakia) Jana Novotná | 4 | 4
