= 1988 Virginia Slims of California – Singles =

Singles
- 1988 Virginia Slims of California

Final
- Champion: (United States) Martina Navratilova
- Runner-up: (Soviet Union) Larisa Savchenko
- Score: 6–1, 6–2

Details
- Draw: 32
- Seeds: 8

Events
Singles	Doubles
← 1987 ·	Virginia Slims of California	· 1989 →

Zina Garrison was the defending champion but lost in the semifinals to Martina Navratilova.

Navratilova won in the final 6–1, 6–2 against Larisa Savchenko.

== Seeds ==
A champion seed is indicated in bold text while text in italics indicates the round in which that seed was eliminated.

1. (United States) **Martina Navratilova (champion)**
2. (Argentina) Gabriela Sabatini (semifinals)
3. (Australia) Hana Mandlíková (quarterfinals)
4. (United States) Zina Garrison (semifinals)
5. (West Germany) Sylvia Hanika (second round)
6. (Soviet Union) Natasha Zvereva (quarterfinals)
7. (United States) Mary Joe Fernández (second round)
8. (Sweden) Catarina Lindqvist (second round)

== Draw ==
=== Key ===
- Q = Qualifier
- WC = Wild card
- LL = Lucky loser
- Alt = Alternate
- SE = Special exempt
- PR = Protected ranking
- ITF = ITF entry
- JE = Junior exempt
- w/o = Walkover
- r = Retired
- d = Defaulted
- SR = Special ranking

First round
1	(United States) **M Navratilova**	**6**	**6**
(United States) S Rehe	3	2
(United States) B Gerken	1	2
(Australia) **W Turnbull**	**6**	**6**
(West Germany) E Pfaff	4	5
Q	(United States) **C Benjamin**	**6**	**7**
(United States) P Harper	6	3
6	(Soviet Union) **N Zvereva**	**7**	**6**
4	(United States) **Z Garrison**	**6**	**6**
(United States) H Ludloff	4	2
(United States) **W White**	**6**	1	**6**
(South Africa) R Fairbank	4	**6**	3
(Soviet Union) L Meskhi	4	**6**	4
(United States) **H Na**	**6**	2	**6**
Q	(Japan) A Kijimuta	0	1
8	(Sweden) **C Lindqvist**	**6**	**6**
7	(United States) **M J Fernández**	**7**	**6**
(United States) E Hakami	5	3
(Soviet Union) **L Savchenko**	**6**	**6**
(United States) M Werdel	1	3
Q	(Soviet Union) N Bykova	5	2
Q	(South Africa) **E Reinach**	**7**	**6**
(United States) L Bonder	3	2
3	(Australia) **H Mandlíková**	**6**	**6**
5	(West Germany) **S Hanika**	**6**	**6**
(United States) T Phelps	4	4
(United States) E Burgin	2	2
(United States) **R White**	**6**	**6**
(Czechoslovakia) **J Novotná**	**7**	**6**
(United States) G Fernández	6	3
(United States) A Henricksson	5	4
2	(Argentina) **G Sabatini**	**7**	**6**

Second round
1	(United States) **M Navratilova**	**6**	**6**
(Australia) W Turnbull	2	0
Q	(United States) C Benjamin	3	2
6	(Soviet Union) **N Zvereva**	**6**	**6**
4	(United States) **Z Garrison**	**6**	**6**
(United States) W White	2	2
(United States) **H Na**	**6**	**6**
8	(Sweden) C Lindqvist	2	2
7	(United States) M J Fernández	**6**	3	4
(Soviet Union) **L Savchenko**	3	**6**	**6**
Q	(South Africa) E Reinach	**7**	1	1
3	(Australia) **H Mandlíková**	6	**6**	**6**
5	(West Germany) S Hanika	1	4
(United States) **R White**	**6**	**6**
(Czechoslovakia) J Novotná	4	3
2	(Argentina) **G Sabatini**	**6**	**6**

Quarterfinals
1	(United States) **M Navratilova**	**6**	**6**
6	(Soviet Union) N Zvereva	0	2
4	(United States) **Z Garrison**	**6**	**6**
(United States) H Na	2	0
(Soviet Union) **L Savchenko**	**6**	2	**7**
3	(Australia) H Mandlíková	3	**6**	6
(United States) R White	2	**6**	2
2	(Argentina) **G Sabatini**	**6**	3	**6**

Semifinals
1	(United States) **M Navratilova**	**6**	**6**
4	(United States) Z Garrison	2	0
(Soviet Union) **L Savchenko**	**7**	**6**
2	(Argentina) G Sabatini	5	4

Final
1	(United States) **Martina Navratilova**	**6**	**6**
(Soviet Union) Larisa Savchenko	1	2
