= 1984 Player's Canadian Open – Men's singles =

Men's singles
- 1984 Player's Canadian Open

Final
- Champion: (United States) John McEnroe
- Runner-up: (United States) Vitas Gerulaitis
- Score: 6–0, 6–3

Details
- Draw: 56
- Seeds: 16

Events
| Singles | men | women |
| Doubles | men | women |
| ← 1983 · | Player's Canadian Open | · 1985 → |

Ivan Lendl was the defending champion, but lost in the second round this year.

John McEnroe successfully defended his title, defeating Vitas Gerulaitis 6–0, 6–3 in the final.

== Seeds ==
1. (Czechoslovakia) Ivan Lendl (second round)
2. (United States) John McEnroe (champion)
3. (United States) Jimmy Connors (semifinals)
4. (United States) Jimmy Arias (quarterfinals)
5. (United States) Johan Kriek (second round)
6. (Sweden) Anders Järryd (third round)
7. (United States) Eliot Teltscher (quarterfinals)
8. (United States) Vitas Gerulaitis (final)
9. (Australia) Pat Cash (third round)
10. (Sweden) Joakim Nyström (second round)
11. (United States) Tim Mayotte (first round)
12. (United States) Bill Scanlon (third round)
13. (South Africa) Kevin Curren (semifinals)
14. (France) Henri Leconte (third round)
15. (Switzerland) Heinz Günthardt (first round)
16. (United States) Peter Fleming (quarterfinals)

== Draw ==
=== Key ===
- Q = Qualifier
- WC = Wild card
- LL = Lucky loser
- Alt = Alternate
- SE = Special exempt
- PR = Protected ranking
- ITF = ITF entry
- JE = Junior exempt
- w/o = Walkover
- r = Retired
- d = Defaulted
- SR = Special ranking

=== Finals ===
Semifinals
13 | (South Africa) Kevin Curren | 6 | 6 | 6
8 | (United States) Vitas Gerulaitis | 4 | 7 | 7
3 | (United States) Jimmy Connors | 6 | 2 | 3
2 | (United States) John McEnroe | 2 | 6 | 6

Final
8 | (United States) Vitas Gerulaitis | 0 | 3
2 | (United States) John McEnroe | 6 | 6

=== Top half ===
==== Section 1 ====
First round
(Paraguay) F González | 7 | 6
(United States) L Bourne | 6 | 4
(Poland) W Fibak | 6 | 6 | 2
(United States) L Stefanki | 4 | 7 | 6
(United States) M Doyle | 2 | 2
13 | (South Africa) K Curren | 6 | 6
10 | (Sweden) J Nyström | 6 | 6
WC | (Canada) G Connell | 4 | 3
Q | (United States) S McCain | 3 | 6 | 6
(United States) M Davis | 6 | 2 | 3
Q | (France) J Vanier | 1 | 0
(United States) V Winitsky | 6 | 6

Second round
1 | (Czechoslovakia) I Lendl | 6 | 4
(Paraguay) F González | 7 | 6
(United States) L Stefanki | 4 | 2
13 | (South Africa) K Curren | 6 | 6
10 | (Sweden) J Nyström | 4 | 1
Q | (United States) S McCain | 6 | 6
(United States) V Winitsky | 3 | 7 | 6
5 | (United States) J Kriek | 6 | 5 | 0

Third round
(Paraguay) F González | 6 | 5
13 | (South Africa) K Curren | 7 | 7
Q | (United States) S McCain | 2 | 6 | 6
(United States) V Winitsky | 6 | 1 | 3

Quarterfinals
13 | (South Africa) K Curren | 3 | 6 | 6
Q | (United States) S McCain | 6 | 2 | 1

==== Section 2 ====
First round
(United States) G Holmes | 6 | 6
(Czechoslovakia) M Lacek | 3 | 2
(Hungary) Z Kuharszky | 1 | 3
(Australia) J Fitzgerald | 6 | 6
(United States) R Seguso | 6 | 5
12 | (United States) B Scanlon | 7 | 7
15 | (Switzerland) H Günthardt | 4 | 6
(United States) S Meister | 6 | 7
(Australia) B Drewett | 6 | 3
Q | (United States) T Nelson | 7 | 6
(United States) T Wilkison | 6 | 6
(United States) F Buehning | 2 | 3

Second round
4 | (United States) J Arias | 3 | 7 | 7
(United States) G Holmes | 6 | 6 | 5
(Australia) J Fitzgerald | 1 | 3
12 | (United States) B Scanlon | 6 | 6
(United States) S Meister | 6 | 6
Q | (United States) T Nelson | 1 | 4
(United States) T Wilkison | 7 | 1 | 6
8 | (United States) V Gerulaitis | 6 | 6 | 7

Third round
4 | (United States) J Arias | 7 | 4 | 7
12 | (United States) B Scanlon | 6 | 6 | 6
(United States) S Meister | 6 | 6 | 5
8 | (United States) V Gerulaitis | 3 | 7 | 7

Quarterfinals
4 | (United States) J Arias | 5 | 3
8 | (United States) V Gerulaitis | 7 | 6

==== Section 3 ====
First round
(Sweden) T Högstedt | 7 | 4 | 3
(United States) L Shiras | 6 | 6 | 6
(Israel) S Glickstein | 6 | 6
(Australia) P McNamee | 1 | 4
(Sweden) S Simonsson | 7 | 7
11 | (United States) T Mayotte | 6 | 6
9 | (Australia) P Cash | 6 | 6
WC | (Canada) H McDadi | 4 | 1
WC | (Canada) D Segal | 3 | 2
(United States) J Sadri | 6 | 6
Q | (United States) A Kohlberg | 2 | 6 | 6
WC | (Canada) S Bonneau | 6 | 4 | 4

Second round
7 | (United States) E Teltscher | 6 | 6
(United States) L Shiras | 4 | 2
(Israel) S Glickstein | 6 | 0 | 6
(Sweden) S Simonsson | 4 | 6 | 2
9 | (Australia) P Cash | 4 | 6 | 7
(United States) J Sadri | 6 | 1 | 6
Q | (United States) A Kohlberg | 2 | 3
3 | (United States) J Connors | 6 | 6

Third round
7 | (United States) E Teltscher | 7 | 6
(Israel) S Glickstein | 5 | 3
9 | (Australia) P Cash | 3 | 3
3 | (United States) J Connors | 6 | 6

Quarterfinals
7 | (United States) E Teltscher | 2 | 4
3 | (United States) J Connors | 6 | 6

==== Section 4 ====
First round
Q | (Spain) J López-Maeso | 6 | 6 | 6
(Canada) G Michibata | 7 | 2 | 3
(West Germany) H Schwaier | 6 | 7
(United States) S Denton | 4 | 6
Q | (West Germany) J Becka | 4 | 6 | 3
16 | (United States) P Fleming | 6 | 4 | 6
14 | (France) H Leconte | 4 | 7 | 7
(Brazil) C Motta | 6 | 6 | 6
(United Kingdom) J Lloyd | 3 | 2
Q | (Socialist Federal Republic of Yugoslavia) S Živojinović | 6 | 6
(Australia) M Edmondson | 6 | 6
WC | (Canada) M Wostenholme | 4 | 3

Second round
6 | (Sweden) A Järryd | 4 | 6 | 6
Q | (Spain) J López-Maeso | 6 | 3 | 4
(West Germany) H Schwaier | 6 | 2 | 6
16 | (United States) P Fleming | 2 | 6 | 7
14 | (France) H Leconte | 7 | 6
Q | (Socialist Federal Republic of Yugoslavia) S Živojinović | 6 | 4
(Australia) M Edmondson | 2 | 1
2 | (United States) J McEnroe | 6 | 6

Third round
6 | (Sweden) A Järryd | 6 | 2 | 4
16 | (United States) P Fleming | 0 | 6 | 6
14 | (France) H Leconte | 6 | 6
2 | (United States) J McEnroe | 7 | 7

Quarterfinals
16 | (United States) P Fleming | 2 | 4
2 | (United States) J McEnroe | 6 | 6
