= 1990 Virginia Slims of California =

- Date: October 29 – November 4
- Edition: 19th
- Category: Tier II
- Draw: 28S / 16D
- Prize money: $350,000
- Surface: Carpet / indoor
- Location: Oakland, California, U.S.
- Venue: Oakland-Alameda County Coliseum Arena

Champions

Singles
- (Socialist Federal Republic of Yugoslavia) Monica Seles

Doubles
- (United States) Meredith McGrath / (United States) Anne Smith
- Stanford Classic

The 1990 Virginia Slims of California was a women's tennis tournament played on indoor carpet courts at the Oakland-Alameda County Coliseum Arena in Oakland, California in the United States and was part of the Tier II category of the 1990 WTA Tour. It was the 19th edition of the tournament ran from October 29 through November 4, 1990. Second-seeded Monica Seles won the singles title.

== Finals ==
=== Singles ===
(Socialist Federal Republic of Yugoslavia) Monica Seles defeated (United States) Martina Navratilova 6–3, 7–6^{(7–5)}

- It was Seles' 8th singles title of the year and the 9th of her career.

=== Doubles ===
(United States) Meredith McGrath / (United States) Anne Smith defeated (South Africa) Rosalyn Fairbank-Nideffer / (United States) Robin White 2–6, 6–0, 6–4

- It was McGrath's 3rd doubles title of the year and the 4th of her career. It was Smith's 3rd doubles title of the year and the 31st of her career.
