= 1988 Virginia Slims of California =

- Date: February 15–21
- Edition: 17th
- Category: Category 4
- Draw: 32S / 16D
- Prize money: $250,000
- Surface: Hard / indoor
- Location: Oakland, California
- Venue: Oakland-Alameda County Coliseum Arena

Champions

Singles
- (United States) Martina Navratilova

Doubles
- (United States) Rosemary Casals (United States) Martina Navratilova
- Virginia Slims of California

The 1988 Virginia Slims of California was a women's tennis tournament played on indoor hard courts at the Oakland-Alameda County Coliseum Arena in Oakland, California in the United States and was part of the Category 4 tier of the 1988 WTA Tour. It was the 17th edition of the tournament and was held from February 15 through February 21, 1988. First-seeded Martina Navratilova won the singles title.

== Finals ==
=== Singles ===
(United States) Martina Navratilova defeated (Soviet Union) Larisa Savchenko 6–1, 6–2

- It was Navratilova's 2nd singles title of the year and the 131st of her career.

=== Doubles ===
(United States) Rosemary Casals / (United States) Martina Navratilova defeated (Australia) Hana Mandlíková / (Czechoslovakia) Jana Novotná 6–4, 6–4

- It was Casals' only title of the year and the 42nd of her career. It was Navratilova's 4th title of the year and the 268th of her career.
