= 1989 Virginia Slims of California – Doubles =

Doubles
- 1989 Virginia Slims of California
- 1988 Champions: (United States) Rosemary Casals (United States) Martina Navratilova

Final
- Champions: (United States) Patty Fendick (Canada) Jill Hetherington
- Runners-up: (Soviet Union) Larisa Savchenko (Soviet Union) Natasha Zvereva
- Score: 7–5, 3–6, 6–2

Events
Singles	Doubles
← 1988 ·	Virginia Slims of California	· 1990 →

Rosemary Casals and Martina Navratilova were the defending champions but lost in the semifinals to Larisa Savchenko and Natasha Zvereva.

Patty Fendick and Jill Hetherington won in the final 7–5, 3–6, 6–2 against Savchenko and Zvereva.

== Seeds ==
Champion seeds are indicated in bold text while text in italics indicates the round in which those seeds were eliminated.

1. (Soviet Union) Larisa Savchenko / (Soviet Union) Natasha Zvereva (final)
2. (United States) **Patty Fendick** / (Canada) **Jill Hetherington (champions)**
3. (United States) Gigi Fernández / (West Germany) Eva Pfaff (first round)
4. (United States) Elise Burgin / (South Africa) Rosalyn Fairbank (first round)

== Draw ==
=== Key ===
- Q = Qualifier
- WC = Wild card
- LL = Lucky loser
- Alt = Alternate
- SE = Special exempt
- PR = Protected ranking
- ITF = ITF entry
- JE = Junior exempt
- w/o = Walkover
- r = Retired
- d = Defaulted
- SR = Special ranking

First round
1	(Soviet Union) **L Savchenko** (Soviet Union) **N Zvereva**	**6**	**6**
(Australia) J Byrne (United States) R White	2	2
(United States) L Bartlett (United States) A M Fernandez	4	3
(United States) **G Magers** (South Africa) **D van Rensburg**	**6**	**6**
4	(United States) E Burgin (South Africa) R Fairbank	4	3
(United States) **R Casals** (United States) **M Navratilova**	**6**	**6**
(United States) A Henricksson (United States) S Walsh-Pete	5	3
(United States) **B Herr** (United States) **C Reynolds**	**7**	**6**
(United States) L Antonoplis (United States) J Smoller	**7**	1	6
(United States) **Ca MacGregor** (United States) **Cy MacGregor**	6	**6**	**7**
(United States) **Z Garrison** (United States) **K Rinaldi**	**7**	**6**
3	(United States) G Fernández (West Germany) E Pfaff	5	4
(United States) **C Benjamin** (South Africa) **E Reinach**	**6**	**6**
(France) I Demongeot (France) N Tauziat	3	4
(Sweden) M Lindström (United States) H Ludloff	4	**7**	4
2	(United States) **P Fendick** (Canada) **J Hetherington**	**6**	6	**6**

Quarterfinals
1	(Soviet Union) **L Savchenko** (Soviet Union) **N Zvereva**	**6**	**6**
(United States) G Magers (South Africa) D van Rensburg	1	1
(United States) **R Casals** (United States) **M Navratilova**	**6**	**6**
(United States) B Herr (United States) C Reynolds	4	3
(United States) Ca MacGregor (United States) Cy MacGregor	5	6
(United States) **Z Garrison** (United States) **K Rinaldi**	**7**	**7**
(United States) C Benjamin (South Africa) E Reinach	**6**	1	6
2	(United States) **P Fendick** (Canada) **J Hetherington**	2	**6**	**7**

Semifinals
1	(Soviet Union) **L Savchenko** (Soviet Union) **N Zvereva**	3	**6**	**6**
(United States) R Casals (United States) M Navratilova	**6**	3	4
(United States) Z Garrison (United States) K Rinaldi	2	**6**	6
2	(United States) **P Fendick** (Canada) **J Hetherington**	**6**	4	**7**

Final
1	(Soviet Union) Larisa Savchenko (Soviet Union) Natasha Zvereva	5	**6**	2
2	(United States) **Patty Fendick** (Canada) **Jill Hetherington**	**7**	3	**6**
