= 1984 Player's Canadian Open – Men's doubles =

Men's doubles
- 1984 Player's Canadian Open

Final
- Champions: (United States) Peter Fleming (United States) John McEnroe
- Runners-up: (Australia) John Fitzgerald (Australia) Kim Warwick
- Score: 6–4, 6–2

Details
- Draw: 28
- Seeds: 8

Events
Singles	men	women
Doubles	men	women
- Canadian Open

Sandy Mayer and Ferdi Taygan were the defending champions, but Mayer chose to compete at Columbus during the same week, winning the title alongside Stan Smith. Taygan teamed up with Fritz Buehning and lost in the semifinals to John Fitzgerald and Kim Warwick.

Peter Fleming and John McEnroe won the title by defeating Fitzgerald and Warwick 6–4, 6–2 in the final.

== Seeds ==
The first four seeds received a bye to the second round.

1. (United States) Peter Fleming / (United States) John McEnroe (champions)
2. (Australia) Mark Edmondson / (United States) Sherwood Stewart (second round)
3. (Australia) Pat Cash / (Australia) Paul McNamee (quarterfinals)
4. (United States) Fritz Buehning / (United States) Ferdi Taygan (semifinals)
5. (South Africa) Kevin Curren / (United States) Steve Denton (quarterfinals)
6. (Switzerland) Heinz Günthardt / (Hungary) Balázs Taróczy (semifinals)
7. (Australia) John Fitzgerald / (Australia) Kim Warwick (final)
8. (United States) Ken Flach / (United States) Robert Seguso (first round)

== Draw ==
Key

- Q = Qualifier
- WC = Wild card
- LL = Lucky loser
- Alt = Alternate
- ITF = ITF entry
- PR = Protected ranking
- SR = Special ranking
- SE = Special exempt
- JE = Junior exempt
- JR = Junior Accelerator Programme entrant
- CO = College Accelerator Programme entrant
- NG = Next Gen Accelerator Program entrant
- w/o = Walkover
- r = Retired
- d = Defaulted

=== Finals ===
Semifinals
1	(United States) Peter Fleming (United States) John McEnroe	7	3	6
6	(Switzerland) Heinz Günthardt (Hungary) Balázs Taróczy	6	6	3
4	(United States) Fritz Buehning (United States) Ferdi Taygan	6	3	3
7	(Australia) John Fitzgerald (Australia) Kim Warwick	4	6	6

Final
1	(United States) Peter Fleming (United States) John McEnroe	6	6
7	(Australia) John Fitzgerald (Australia) Kim Warwick	4	2

=== Top half ===
First round
(Hungary) Z Kuhárszky (United States) L Stefanki	6	3
(United States) L Bourne (Israel) S Glickstein	7	6
(Australia) D Graham (Australia) L Warder	7	6	4
(Australia) C Fancutt (Czechoslovakia) I Lendl	6	7	6
(United States) G Donnelly (United States) Ti Wilkison	7	6
8	(United States) K Flach (United States) R Seguso	6	4
(Sweden) A Järryd (Sweden) J Nyström	7	7
(United States) T Giammalva (United States) S Meister	5	6
(Canada) B Cowan (Canada) H Fritz	6	6
(Canada) J Brabenec (Canada) D Segal	7	7
(United States) T Delatte (United States) J Kriek	4	6	2
6	(Switzerland) H Günthardt (Hungary) B Taróczy	6	1	6

Second round
1	(United States) P Fleming (United States) J McEnroe	6	6
(United States) L Bourne (Israel) S Glickstein	1	4
(Australia) C Fancutt (Czechoslovakia) I Lendl	2	6
(United States) G Donnelly (United States) Ti Wilkison	6	7
3	(Australia) P Cash (Australia) P McNamee	6	6
(Sweden) A Järryd (Sweden) J Nyström	3	4
(Canada) J Brabenec (Canada) D Segal	6	2	3
6	(Switzerland) H Günthardt (Hungary) B Taróczy	4	6	6

Quarterfinals
1	(United States) P Fleming (United States) J McEnroe	6	6
(United States) G Donnelly (United States) Ti Wilkison	2	4
3	(Australia) P Cash (Australia) P McNamee	1	3
6	(Switzerland) H Günthardt (Hungary) B Taróczy	6	6

Semifinals
1	(United States) P Fleming (United States) J McEnroe	7	3	6
6	(Switzerland) H Günthardt (Hungary) B Taróczy	6	6	3

=== Bottom half ===
First round
5	(South Africa) K Curren (United States) S Denton	6	7
(Poland) W Fibak (Switzerland) J Hlasek	4	6
(Australia) B Dyke (Australia) M Fancutt	7	6
(United States) E Fromm (United States) E Teltscher	6	4
(United States) A Kohlberg (United States) V Winitsky	4	4
(United States) M Davis (United States) C Dunk	6	6
7	(Australia) J Fitzgerald (Australia) K Warwick	6	4	7
(Sweden) H Simonsson (Sweden) S Simonsson	1	6	6
(Paraguay) F González (United States) J Sadri	6	6
(Canada) S Bonneau (Canada) Martin Dyotte	4	2
(Australia) B Drewett (New Zealand) C Lewis	6	6
(Brazil) C Kirmayr (Brazil) C Motta	2	3

Second round
5	(South Africa) K Curren (United States) S Denton	7	6
(Australia) B Dyke (Australia) M Fancutt	5	2
(United States) M Davis (United States) C Dunk	5	4
4	(United States) F Buehning (United States) F Taygan	7	6
7	(Australia) J Fitzgerald (Australia) K Warwick	7	4	7
(Paraguay) F González (United States) J Sadri	5	6	6
(Australia) B Drewett (New Zealand) C Lewis	6	6
2	(Australia) M Edmondson (United States) S Stewart	3	2

Quarterfinals
5	(South Africa) K Curren (United States) S Denton	4	6
4	(United States) F Buehning (United States) F Taygan	6	7
7	(Australia) J Fitzgerald (Australia) K Warwick	7	6
(Australia) B Drewett (New Zealand) C Lewis	5	4

Semifinals
4	(United States) F Buehning (United States) F Taygan	6	3	3
7	(Australia) J Fitzgerald (Australia) K Warwick	4	6	6
