= 1992 Newsweek Champions Cup and the Matrix Essentials Evert Cup =

1992 Newsweek Champions Cup and Matrix Essentials Evert Cup
- Date: February 24–March 8
- Edition: 19th
- Category: ATP Super 9 WTA Tier II Events
- Prize money: $825,000
- Surface: Hard / outdoor
- Location: Indian Wells, California, US

Champions

Men's singles
- (United States) Michael Chang

Women's singles
- (Socialist Federal Republic of Yugoslavia) Monica Seles

Men's doubles
- (United States) Steve DeVries / (Australia) David MacPherson

Women's doubles
- (Germany) Claudia Kohde-Kilsch / (United States) Stephanie Rehe
← 1991 ·	Newsweek Champions Cup	· 1993 →
← 1991 ·	Matrix Essentials Evert Cup	· 1993 →

The 1992 Newsweek Champions Cup and the Matrix Essentials Evert Cup were tennis tournaments played on outdoor hard courts. It was the 19th edition of the tournament, and was part of the ATP Super 9 of the 1992 ATP Tour, and of the Tier II Series of the 1992 WTA Tour. It was held from February 24 through March 1 for the women, and from March 2 through March 8 for the men.

== Finals ==
=== Men's singles ===
(United States) Michael Chang defeated (Commonwealth of Independent States) Andrei Chesnokov, 6–3, 6–4, 7–5

- It was Chang's 1st title of the year and his 7th overall. It was his 1st Masters title of the year and his 2nd overall.

=== Women's singles ===
(Socialist Federal Republic of Yugoslavia) Monica Seles defeated (Spain) Conchita Martínez, 6–3, 6–1

- It was Seles' 23rd title overall.

=== Men's doubles ===
(United States) Steve DeVries / (Australia) David MacPherson defeated (United States) Kent Kinnear / (United States) Sven Salumaa, 4–6, 6–3, 6–3

=== Women's doubles ===
(Germany) Claudia Kohde-Kilsch / (United States) Stephanie Rehe defeated (Canada) Jill Hetherington / (United States) Kathy Rinaldi, 6–3, 6–3
