= Laird Dunlop =

Canadian tennis player

- Country (sports): Canada
- Born: June 28, 1962 (age 64) Ottawa, Ontario, Canada
- Height: 5 ft 11 in (180 cm)
- Plays: Right-handed

Singles
- Career record: 0–1
- Highest ranking: No. 350 (July 29, 1985)

Grand Slam singles results
- Wimbledon: Q1 (1985)

Doubles
- Career record: 0–1
- Highest ranking: No. 464 (May 19, 1986)

Grand Slam doubles results
- Wimbledon: Q1 (1985)

Laird Dunlop (born June 28, 1962) is a Canadian former professional tennis player.

== Biography ==
Dunlop was raised in Ottawa, Ontario as the youngest of five brothers, all of whom were heavily involved in sport growing up. One of his brothers, Blake Dunlop, played in the National Hockey League.

Active during the 1980s, Dunlop had a best singles world ranking of 350 and played collegiate tennis for Wake Forest University, where he was an All-ACC in 1984. He featured as a wildcard in the singles main draw of the 1985 Canadian Open, losing in the first round to Glenn Michibata.
