= 1985 Player's Canadian Open =

- Date: August 12–18 (men); August 19–25 (women)
- Edition: 96th
- Surface: Hard / outdoor
- Location: Montreal, Quebec, Canada (men); Toronto, Ontario, Canada (women)

Champions

Men's singles
- (United States) John McEnroe

Women's singles
- (United States) Chris Evert-Lloyd

Men's doubles
- (United States) Ken Flach / (United States) Robert Seguso

Women's doubles
- (United States) Gigi Fernández / (United States) Martina Navratilova
- Canadian Open

The 1985 Player's International Canadian Open was a tennis tournament played on outdoor hard courts. The men's tournament was held at the Jarry Park Stadium in Montreal in Canada and was part of the 1985 Nabisco Grand Prix while the women's tournament was held at the National Tennis Centre in Toronto in Canada and was part of the 1985 Virginia Slims World Championship Series. The men's tournament was held from August 12 through August 18, 1985, while the women's tournament was held from August 19 through August 25, 1985.

== Finals ==
=== Men's singles ===
(United States) John McEnroe defeated (Czechoslovakia) Ivan Lendl 7–5, 6–3

- It was McEnroe's 7th singles title of the year and the 66th of his career.

=== Women's singles ===
(United States) Chris Evert Lloyd defeated (West Germany) Claudia Kohde-Kilsch 6–2, 6–4

- It was Evert Lloyd's 7th title of the year and the 143rd of her career, and her 4th Canadian Open title.

=== Men's doubles ===
(United States) Ken Flach / (United States) Robert Seguso defeated (Sweden) Stefan Edberg / (Sweden) Anders Järryd 5–7, 7–6, 6–3

- It was Flach's 6th title of the year and the 12th of his career. It was Seguso's 6th title of the year and the 12th of his career.

=== Women's doubles ===
(United States) Gigi Fernández / (United States) Martina Navratilova defeated (Netherlands) Marcella Mesker / (France) Pascale Paradis 6–4, 6–0

- It was Fernández's 3rd title of the year and the 3rd of her career. It was Navratilova's 21st title of the year and the 208th of her career.

== See also ==
- Lendl–McEnroe rivalry
