= 1987 Virginia Slims of California =

- Date: February 9–15
- Edition: 16th
- Category: Category 3
- Draw: 32S / 16D
- Prize money: $150,000
- Surface: Hard / indoor
- Location: San Francisco, California, U.S.

Champions

Singles
- (United States) Zina Garrison

Doubles
- (Czechoslovakia) Hana Mandlíková (Australia) Wendy Turnbull
- Virginia Slims of California

The 1987 Virginia Slims of California was a women's tennis tournament played on indoor hardcourts in San Francisco, California in the United States and was part of the Category 3 tier of the 1987 WTA Tour. It was the 16th edition of the tournament and was held from February 9 through February 15, 1987. Third-seeded Zina Garrison won the singles title.

== Finals ==
=== Singles ===
(United States) Zina Garrison defeated (West Germany) Sylvia Hanika 7–5, 4–6, 6–3

- It was Garrison's 2nd and last singles title of the year and the 6th of her career.

=== Doubles ===
(Czechoslovakia) Hana Mandlíková / (Australia) Wendy Turnbull defeated (United States) Zina Garrison / (Argentina) Gabriela Sabatini 6–4, 7–6^{(7–4)}
