= 1993 Matrix Essentials Evert Cup – Doubles =

Doubles
- 1993 Matrix Essentials Evert Cup

Final
- Champions: (Australia) Rennae Stubbs; (Czech Republic) Helena Suková
- Runners-up: (United States) Ann Grossman; (Canada) Patricia Hy
- Score: 6–3, 6–4

Details
- Draw: 28
- Seeds: 8

Events
Singles	Doubles
← 1992 ·	Indian Wells Open	· 1994 →

The women's doubles event at the 1993 Matrix Essentials Evert Cup took place between February 22 and February 29 on the outdoor hard courts of the Indian Wells Tennis Garden in Indian Wells, United States. Rennae Stubbs and Helena Suková won the title, defeating Ann Grossman and Patricia Hy in the final.

== Seeds ==
1. (Australia) Rennae Stubbs / (Czech Republic) Helena Suková (champions)
2. (Canada) Jill Hetherington / (United States) Kathy Rinaldi (quarterfinals)
3. (South Africa) Amanda Coetzer / (South Africa) Elna Reinach (semifinals)
4. (Australia) Nicole Provis / (Australia) Elizabeth Smylie (withdrew before the tournament)
5. (United States) Mary Joe Fernández / (United States) Robin White (semifinals)
6. (South Africa) Rosalyn Fairbank-Nideffer / (United States) Stephanie Rehe (quarterfinals)
7. (United States) Sandy Collins / (United States) Rachel McQuillan (first round)
8. (Japan) Rika Hiraki / (New Zealand) Julie Richardson (first round)

== Draw ==
=== Key ===
- Q = Qualifier
- WC = Wild card
- LL = Lucky loser
- Alt = Alternate
- SE = Special exempt
- PR = Protected ranking
- ITF = ITF entry
- JE = Junior exempt
- w/o = Walkover
- r = Retired
- d = Defaulted
- SR = Special ranking

=== Finals ===
Semifinals

Final

1
(Australia) Rennae Stubbs
(Czech Republic) Helena Suková
6
6

3
- (South Africa) Amanda Coetzer
- (South Africa) Elna Reinach
3
4

1
(Australia) Rennae Stubbs
(Czech Republic) Helena Suková
6
6

Q
(United States) Ann Grossman
(Canada) Patricia Hy
4
6
6

Q
- (United States) Ann Grossman
- (Canada) Patricia Hy
3
4

5
- (United States) Mary Joe Fernández
- (United States) Robin White
6
3
4

=== Top half ===
First round

Quarterfinals

Semifinals

Final

1
(Australia) R Stubbs
(Czech Republic) H Suková
6
6

- (Italy) L Ferrando
- (South Africa) D Van Rensburg
4
4

- (Canada) R Simpson-Alter
- (Germany) M Zivec-Skulj
4
1

(Canada) R Simpson-Alter
(Germany) M Živec-Škulj
6
6

1
(Australia) R Stubbs
(Czech Republic) H Suková
7
7

- (United States) S McCarthy
- (United States) K Po
3
1

6
- (South Africa) R Fairbank-Nideffer
- (United States) S Rehe
6^{4}
6^{5}

(United States) G Helgeson
(Bulgaria) K Maleeva
6
6

- (United States) G Helgeson
- (Bulgaria) K Maleeva
2
6
2

- (Argentina) MJ Gaidano
- (Argentina) M Paz
2
1

6
(South Africa) R Fairbank-Nideffer
(United States) S Rehe
6
0
6

6
(South Africa) R Fairbank-Nideffer
(United States) S Rehe
6
6

1
(Australia) R Stubbs
(Czech Republic) H Suková
6
6

3
- (South Africa) A Coetzer
- (South Africa) E Reinach
3
4

3
(South Africa) A Coetzer
(South Africa) E Reinach
7
6

(Australia) L Field
(United States) A Henricksson
6
7

- (Australia) L Field
- (United States) A Henricksson
5
3

WC
- (United States) T Austin
- (United States) E Burgin
1
5

3
(South Africa) A Coetzer
(South Africa) E Reinach
6
6

- (United States) C Cunningham
- (United States) T Whitlinger
6
0
1

- (Australia) J Byrne
- (United States) ML Daniels
1
1

(Australia) J Byrne
(United States) ML Daniels
2
6
6

(Australia) J Byrne
(United States) ML Daniels
6
6

(United States) D Graham
(Netherlands) B Schultz
6
7

- (United States) D Graham
- (Netherlands) B Schultz
4
4

8
- (Japan) R Hiraki
- (New Zealand) J Richardson
4
5

=== Bottom half ===
First round

Quarterfinals

Semifinals

Final

7
- (United States) S Collins
- (Australia) R McQuillan
5
5

Q
(United States) A Grossman
(Canada) P Hy
7
7

Q
(United States) A Grossman
(Canada) P Hy
6
6

- (Australia) T Morton
- (United Kingdom) C Wood
4
6
3

- (Netherlands) M Oremans
- (Austria) P Ritter
4
0

(Netherlands) M Oremans
(Austria) P Ritter
6
4
6

Q
(United States) A Grossman
(Canada) P Hy
6
6

- (United States) Ca MacGregor
- (United States) G Magers
6
2
2

- (United States) C Benjamin
- (Greece) C Papadáki
1
3

(South Africa) T Price
(United States) J Santrock
2
6
6

- (South Africa) T Price
- (United States) J Santrock
4
6
6^{4}

(United States) C Benjamin
(Greece) C Papadáki
6
4
7

Q
(United States) A Grossman
(Canada) P Hy
4
6
6

5
(United States) MJ Fernández
(United States) R White
6
6

5
- (United States) MJ Fernández
- (United States) R White
6
3
4

WC
- (United States) N Hummel
- (United States) J Lee
1
2

5
(United States) MJ Fernández
(United States) R White
6
6

- (United States) L Glitz
- (United States) C Kuhlman
3
2

WC
- (United States) L Davenport
- (United States) M Werdel
3
3

WC
(United States) L Davenport
(United States) M Werdel
6
6

5
(United States) MJ Fernández
(United States) R White
4
7
6

- (Germany) B Rittner
- (Hungary) A Temesvári
3
4

2
- (Canada) J Hetherington
- (United States) K Rinaldi
6
5
3

(United States) K Adams
(United States) B Nagelsen
6
6

- (United States) K Adams
- (United States) B Nagelsen
6^{1}
2

2
(Canada) J Hetherington
(United States) K Rinaldi
7
6
