= 1991 Virginia Slims of California =

- Date: November 4–10
- Edition: 20th
- Category: Tier II
- Draw: 28S / 16D
- Prize money: $350,000
- Surface: Carpet / indoor
- Location: Oakland, California, U.S.
- Venue: Oakland Coliseum Arena

Champions

Singles
- (United States) Martina Navratilova

Doubles
- (United States) Patty Fendick / (United States) Gigi Fernández
- Stanford Classic

The 1991 Virginia Slims of California was a women's tennis tournament played on indoor carpet courts at the Oakland Coliseum Arena in Oakland, California in the United States and was part of the Tier II category of the 1991 WTA Tour. It was the 20th edition of the tournament ran from November 4 through November 10, 1991. Second-seeded Martina Navratilova won the singles title and earned $70,000 first-prize money as well as 300 ranking points.

== Finals ==
=== Singles ===
(United States) Martina Navratilova defeated (Socialist Federal Republic of Yugoslavia) Monica Seles 6–3, 3–6, 6–3

- It was Navratilova's 5th singles title of the year and the 157th of her career.

=== Doubles ===
(United States) Patty Fendick / (United States) Gigi Fernández defeated (United States) Martina Navratilova / (United States) Pam Shriver 6–4, 7–5

- It was Fendick's 4th doubles title of the year and the 14th of her career. It was Fernández' 4th doubles title of the year and the 23rd of her career.
