= 1993 Matrix Essentials Evert Cup – Singles =

Singles
- 1993 Matrix Essentials Evert Cup

Final
- Champion: (United States) Mary Joe Fernández
- Runner-up: (South Africa) Amanda Coetzer
- Score: 3–6, 6–1, 7–6^{(8–6)}

Details
- Draw: 56
- Seeds: 16

Events
Singles	Doubles
← 1992 ·	Indian Wells Open	· 1994 →

The singles Tournament at the Matrix Essentials Evert Cup took place between February 22 and February 29 on the outdoor hard courts of the Indian Wells Tennis Garden in Indian Wells, California, United States. Mary Joe Fernández won the title, defeating Amanda Coetzer in the final.

== Seeds ==
1. (United States) Mary Joe Fernández (champion)
2. (Bulgaria) Katerina Maleeva (second round)
3. (Bulgaria) Magdalena Maleeva (quarterfinals)
4. (South Africa) Amanda Coetzer (final)
5. (Czech Republic) Helena Suková (semifinals)
6. (Netherlands) Brenda Schultz (third round)
7. (Canada) Patricia Hy (third round)
8. (Germany) Barbara Rittner (third round)
9. (United States) Ann Grossman (second round)
10. (South Africa) Rosalyn Fairbank-Nideffer (first round)
11. (Australia) Nicole Provis (quarterfinals)
12. (United States) Debbie Graham (second round)
13. (United States) Marianne Werdel (second round)
14. (Australia) Rachel McQuillan (third round)
15. (United States) Ginger Helgeson (third round)
16. (Italy) Linda Ferrando (first round)

== Draw ==
=== Key ===
- Q = Qualifier
- WC = Wild card
- LL = Lucky loser
- Alt = Alternate
- SE = Special exempt
- PR = Protected ranking
- ITF = ITF entry
- JE = Junior exempt
- w/o = Walkover
- r = Retired
- d = Defaulted
- SR = Special ranking

=== Finals ===
Quarterfinals
1	(United States) Mary Joe Fernández	7	6
(United States) Lindsay Davenport	5	2
3	(Bulgaria) Magdalena Maleeva	1	5
5	(Czech Republic) Helena Suková	6	7
11	(Australia) Nicole Provis	4	0
4	(South Africa) Amanda Coetzer	6	6
(Netherlands) Miriam Oremans	2	3
(Netherlands) Stephanie Rottier	6	6

Semifinals
1	(United States) Mary Joe Fernández	6	6
5	(Czech Republic) Helena Suková	3	1
4	(South Africa) Amanda Coetzer	6	6
(Netherlands) Stephanie Rottier	4	3

Finals
1	(United States) Mary Joe Fernández	3	6	7
5	(South Africa) Amanda Coetzer	6	1	6^{6}

=== Top half ===
==== Section 1 ====
First round
(Italy) G Pizzichini	5	6^{3}
Q	(United States) R Jensen	7	7
(United States) R White	3	1
(United States) K Po	6	6
(United Kingdom) M Javer	6^{4}	3
9	(United States) A Grossman	7	6
12	(United States) D Graham	6	6
(Australia) L Field	0	1
(Mexico) A Gavaldón	7	6^{4}	2
(United States) L Davenport	5	7	6
Q	(United States) Ca MacGregor	2	3
(South Africa) D Van Rensburg	6	6

Second round
1	(United States) MJ Fernández	6	6^{4}	6
Q	(United States) R Jensen	2	7	2
(United States) K Po	6	2	7
9	(United States) A Grossman	2	6	6^{3}
12	(United States) D Graham	4	6	3
(United States) L Davenport	6	2	6
(South Africa) D Van Rensburg	4	3
6	(Netherlands) B Schultz	6	6

Third round
1	(United States) MJ Fernández	6	6
(United States) K Po	3	3
(United States) L Davenport	6	7
6	(Netherlands) B Schultz	2	5

Quarterfinals
1	(United States) MJ Fernández	7	6
(United States) L Davenport	5	2

==== Section 2 ====
First round
(Canada) R Simpson-Alter	7	6
Q	(United States) N London	6^{4}	4
Q	(United States) ML Daniels	7	5	3
(Hungary) A Temesvári	6^{6}	7	6
(Germany) M Živec-Škulj	6	3	2
14	(Australia) R McQuillan	1	6	6
10	(South Africa) R Fairbank-Nideffer	6	2	1
LL	(United Kingdom) C Wood	4	6	6
(United States) K Rinaldi	7	4	6
(South Africa) T Prise	5	6	4
(Austria) P Ritter	2	5
(United States) C Kuhlman	6	7

Second round
3	(Bulgaria) Mag Maleeva	6	7
(Canada) R Simpson-Alter	3	6^{1}
(Hungary) A Temesvári	3	1
14	(Australia) R McQuillan	6	6
LL	(United Kingdom) C Wood	5	7	6
(United States) K Rinaldi	7	5	2
(United States) C Kuhlman	1	3
5	(Czech Republic) H Suková	6	6

Third round
3	(Bulgaria) Mag Maleeva	6	2	7
14	(Australia) R McQuillan	4	6	6^{3}
LL	(United Kingdom) C Wood	1	5
5	(Czech Republic) H Suková	6	7

Quarterfinals
3	(Bulgaria) Mag Maleeva	1	5
5	(Czech Republic) H Suková	6	7

=== Bottom half ===
==== Section 3 ====
First round
(South Africa) J Kruger	4	6	6
(Japan) N Miyagi	6	4	4
Q	(United States) A Mall	6	5	6
(United States) K Adams	3	7	4
Q	(United States) J Watanabe	5	1
11	(Australia) N Provis	7	6
15	(United States) G Helgeson	6	6
(Argentina) M Paz	3	1
Q	(Canada) J Hetherington	2	1
(United States) C Cunningham	6	6
(United States) J Santrock	2	1
(Japan) R Hiraki	6	6

Second round
8	(Germany) B Rittner	6	6
(South Africa) J Kruger	1	3
(United States) A Mall	1	0
11	(Australia) N Provis	6	6
15	(United States) G Helgeson	6	1	6
(United States) C Cunningham	0	6	2
(Japan) R Hiraki	0	1
4	(South Africa) A Coetzer	6	6

Third round
8	(Germany) B Rittner	6	2	6^{3}
11	(Australia) N Provis	2	6	7
15	(United States) G Helgeson	1	2
4	(South Africa) A Coetzer	6	6

Quarterfinals
11	(Australia) N Provis	4	0
4	(South Africa) A Coetzer	6	6

==== Section 4 ====
First round
(South Africa) E Reinach	6	6
WC	(Greece) C Papadáki	4	1
Q	(New Zealand) J Richardson	5	1
(Netherlands) M Oremans	7	6
(United States) T Whitlinger	3	7	4
13	(United States) M Werdel	6	5	6
16	(Italy) L Ferrando	4	6	1
(Netherlands) S Rottier	6	1	6
WC	(United States) J Steven	6	3	6
(Australia) J Byrne	3	6	2
(Australia) R Stubbs	5	4
WC	(United States) T Austin	7	6

Second round
7	(Canada) P Hy	2	7	6
(South Africa) E Reinach	6	5	2
(Netherlands) M Oremans	6	1	6
13	(United States) M Werdel	0	6	3
(Netherlands) S Rottier	6	6
WC	(United States) J Steven	0	4
WC	(United States) T Austin	6	2	6
2	(Bulgaria) K Maleeva	2	6	3

Third round
(Canada) P Hy	6^{6}	6	4
(Netherlands) M Oremans	7	3	6
(Netherlands) S Rottier	6	6
WC	(United States) T Austin	1	0

Quarterfinals
(Netherlands) M Oremans	2	3
(Netherlands) S Rottier	6	6
