= 1991 Newsweek Champions Cup and the Virginia Slims of Palm Springs =

1991 Newsweek Champions Cup and Virginia Slims of Palm Springs
- Date: March 2–16
- Edition: 18th
- Prize money: $750,000
- Surface: Hard / outdoor
- Location: Indian Wells, California, US

Champions

Men's singles
- (United States) Jim Courier

Women's singles
- (United States) Martina Navratilova

Men's doubles
- (United States) Jim Courier / (Spain) Javier Sánchez

Women's doubles
- See Women's doubles note
← 1990 ·	Newsweek Champions Cup	· 1992 →
← 1990 ·	Virginia Slims of Palm Springs	· 1992 →

The 1991 Newsweek Champions Cup and the Virginia Slims of Palm Springs were tennis tournaments played on outdoor hard courts. It was the 18th edition of the tournament, and was part of the ATP Super 9 of the 1991 ATP Tour, and of the Tier II Series of the 1991 WTA Tour. It was held from March 2 through March 16, 1991.

In the men's tournament, Jim Courier won both the singles and doubles tournaments, partnering Javier Sánchez in the latter. This is the first time ever that a male player achieved both titles at the same year.

== Finals ==
=== Men's singles ===
(United States) Jim Courier defeated (France) Guy Forget, 4–6, 6–3, 4–6, 6–3, 7–6^{(7–4)}

- It was Courier's 1st title of the year and his 2nd overall. It was his 1st Masters title.

=== Women's singles ===
(United States) Martina Navratilova defeated (Socialist Federal Republic of Yugoslavia) Monica Seles 6–2, 7–6^{(8–6)}

- It was Navratilova's 2nd title of the year and her 154th overall.

=== Men's doubles ===
(United States) Jim Courier / (Spain) Javier Sánchez defeated (France) Guy Forget / (France) Henri Leconte 7–6, 3–6, 6–3

=== Women's doubles ===
The women's doubles final was not played due to rain.
