= Jill Hetherington =

Canadian tennis player and coach (born 1964)

Jill Hetherington-Hultquist
- Country (sports): Canada
- Born: October 27, 1964 (age 61) Brampton, Ontario
- Height: 1.78 m (5 ft 10 in)
- Turned pro: 1983
- Retired: 1997
- Plays: Right-handed (two-handed backhand)
- College: University of Florida
- Prize money: US $798,040

Singles
- Career record: 95–113
- Career titles: 1 WTA, 1 ITF
- Highest ranking: No. 64 (29 February 1988)

Grand Slam singles results
- Australian Open: 2R (1989)
- French Open: Q1 (1984, 1985)
- Wimbledon: 1R (1988, 1989, 1991)
- US Open: 3R (1988)

Other tournaments
- Olympic Games: 2R (1984, 1988)

Doubles
- Career record: 351–223
- Career titles: 14 WTA, 6 ITF
- Highest ranking: No. 6 (27 March 1989)

Grand Slam doubles results
- Australian Open: F (1989)
- French Open: 3R (1984, 1992)
- Wimbledon: SF (1986)
- US Open: F (1988)

Other doubles tournaments
- Olympic Games: QF (1988, 1996)

Grand Slam mixed doubles results
- Australian Open: SF (1993, 1996)
- French Open: F (1995)
- Wimbledon: QF (1991)
- US Open: SF (1992, 1994)
Medal record
Representing Canada
Summer Universiade
Gold medal – first place	1983 Edmonton	Women's doubles
Gold medal – first place	1983 Edmonton	Mixed doubles

Jill Hetherington-Hultquist (born October 27, 1964) is a Canadian former professional tennis player. She played college tennis for the University of Florida, and was women's tennis head coach at the University of Washington until May 2014.

== College career ==
Born in Brampton, Ontario, Hetherington attended the University of Florida in Gainesville, Florida, where she played for coach Andy Brandi's Florida Gators women's tennis team from 1984 to 1987. While playing for the Gators, she won four straight Southeastern Conference (SEC) singles championships, three as the team's No. 2 singles player, and once as the No. 1 singles player. She also won three consecutive SEC doubles championships from 1985 to 1987. Hultquist was recognized as a four-time first-team All-SEC selection and received four All-American honors. She was inducted into the University of Florida Athletic Hall of Fame as a "Gator Great" in 1999.

== Professional career ==
After turning professional, she won one singles title and fourteen doubles titles on the WTA Tour during her career. Her best Grand Slam results were reaching the women's doubles final at the 1988 US Open and the 1989 Australian Open, and the mixed doubles final at the 1995 French Open.

== Grand Slam finals ==
=== Doubles: 2 runner-ups ===
Result	Year	Championship	Surface	Partner	Opponents	Score
Loss	1988	US Open	Hard	(United States) Patty Fendick	(United States) Gigi Fernández (United States) Robin White	6–4, 6–1
Loss	1989	Australian Open	Hard	(United States) Patty Fendick	(United States) Martina Navratilova (United States) Pam Shriver	3–6, 6–3, 6–2

==== Mixed doubles: 1 runner-up ====
Result	Year	Championship	Surface	Partner	Opponents	Score
Loss	1995	French Open	Clay	(South Africa) John-Laffnie de Jager	(Latvia) Larisa Savchenko Neiland (Australia) Todd Woodbridge	7–6^{(10–8)}, 7–6^{(7–4)}

== WTA career finals ==
=== Singles: 1 title ===
Result	W/L	Date	Tournament	Surface	Opponent	Score
Win	1–0	Feb 1988	Wellington Classic, New Zealand	Hard	(United States) Katrina Adams	6–1, 6–1

=== Doubles: 34 (14 titles, 20 runner-ups) ===
Result	No.	Date	Tournament	Surface	Partner	Opponents	Score
Win	1.	Jul 1984	WTA Brasil Open	Hard	(Canada) Hélène Pelletier	(United States) Penny Mager (United States) Kyle Copeland	6–3, 2–6, 7–6^{(7)}
Loss	1.	Dec 1987	Buenos Aires, Argentina	Clay	(Switzerland) Christiane Jolissaint	(Argentina) Mercedes Paz (Argentina) Gabriela Sabatini	2–6, 2–6
Loss	2.	Dec 1987	WTA Brasil Open	Hard	(Argentina) Mercedes Paz	(United States) Katrina Adams (United States) Cheryl Jones	4–6, 6–4, 4–6
Win	2.	Jan 1988	Auckland Open, New Zealand	Hard	(United States) Patty Fendick	(United States) Cammy MacGregor (United States) Cynthia MacGregor	6–2, 6–1
Win	3.	Feb 1988	Wellington Classic, New Zealand	Hard	(United States) Patty Fendick	(New Zealand) Belinda Cordwell (New Zealand) Julie Richardson	6–3, 6–3
Loss	3.	Jul 1988	Northern California Open, United States	Hard	(United States) Patty Fendick	(United States) Ronni Reis (South Africa) Lise Gregory	3–6, 4–6
Win	4.	Aug 1988	San Diego Classic, United States	Hard	(United States) Patty Fendick	(United States) Betsy Nagelsen (South Africa) Dinky Van Rensburg	7–6^{(10)}, 6–4
Win	5.	Aug 1988	Los Angeles Classic, United States	Hard	(United States) Patty Fendick	(United States) Gigi Fernández (United States) Robin White	7–6^{(2)}, 5–7, 6–4
Loss	4.	Aug 1988	US Open	Hard	(United States) Patty Fendick	(United States) Gigi Fernández (United States) Robin White	4–6, 1–6
Win	6.	Oct 1988	Puerto Rico Open	Hard	(United States) Patty Fendick	(United States) Gigi Fernández (United States) Robin White	6–4, 6–2
Loss	5.	Jan 1989	Hardcourt Championships, Australia	Hard	(United States) Patty Fendick	(Czech Republic) Jana Novotná (Czech Republic) Helena Suková	7–6^{(4)}, 1–6, 2–6
Loss	6.	Jan 1989	Australian Open	Hard	(United States) Patty Fendick	(United States) Martina Navratilova (United States) Pam Shriver	6–3, 3–6, 2–6
Win	7.	Feb 1989	Auckland Open, New Zealand	Hard	(United States) Patty Fendick	(Australia) Elizabeth Smylie (Australia) Janine Thompson	6–4, 6–4
Win	8.	Feb 1989	California Classic, United States	Carpet (i)	(United States) Patty Fendick	(Soviet Union) Larisa Neiland (Soviet Union) Natasha Zvereva	7–5, 3–6, 6–2
Loss	7.	Feb 1989	San Antonio Open, United States	Hard	(United States) Patty Fendick	(United States) Katrina Adams (United States) Pam Shriver	6–3, 1–6, 4–6
Win	9.	Apr 1989	Japan Open	Hard	(Australia) Elizabeth Smylie	(United States) Ann Henricksson (United States) Beth Herr	6–1, 6–3
Loss	8.	Jan 1990	Auckland Open, New Zealand	Hard	(United States) Robin White	(Soviet Union) Natalia Medvedeva (Soviet Union) Leila Meskhi	6–3, 3–6, 6–7^{(3)}
Win	10.	Apr 1990	Singapore Open	Hard	(United Kingdom) Jo Durie	(France) Pascale Paradis (France) Catherine Suire	6–4, 6–1
Loss	9.	Nov 1990	VS Indianapolis, United States	Hard (i)	(United States) Katrina Adams	(United States) Patty Fendick (United States) Meredith McGrath	1–6, 1–6
Loss	10.	Feb 1991	Cellular South Cup, United States	Hard (i)	(United States) Katrina Adams	(United States) Meredith McGrath (United States) Anne Smith	2–6, 4–6
Loss	11.	Mar 1991	San Antonio Open, United States	Hard	(United States) Kathy Rinaldi	(United States) Patty Fendick (Socialist Federal Republic of Yugoslavia) Monica Seles	6–7^{(2)}, 2–6
Win	11.	Apr 1991	VS Houston, United States	Clay	(United States) Kathy Rinaldi	(United States) Patty Fendick (United States) Mary Joe Fernández	6–1, 2–6, 6–1
Win	12.	Aug 1991	San Diego Classic, United States	Hard	(United States) Kathy Rinaldi	(United States) Gigi Fernández (France) Nathalie Tauziat	6–4, 3–6, 6–2
Loss	12.	Oct 1991	Leipzig, Germany	Carpet (i)	(United States) Kathy Rinaldi	(Netherlands) Manon Bollegraf (France) Isabelle Demongeot	4–6, 3–6
Loss	13.	Feb 1992	Auckland Open, New Zealand	Hard	(United States) Kathy Rinaldi	(South Africa) Rosalyn Fairbank (Italy) Raffaella Reggi	6–1, 1–6, 5–7
Loss	14.	Mar 1992	Indian Wells Open, United States	Hard	(United States) Kathy Rinaldi	(Germany) Claudia Kohde-Kilsch (United States) Stephanie Rehe	3–6, 3–6
Loss	15.	Mar 1992	Miami Open, United States	Hard	(United States) Kathy Rinaldi	(Latvia) Larisa Neiland (Spain) Arantxa Sánchez Vicario	5–7, 7–5, 3–6
Loss	16.	Apr 1992	VS Houston, United States	Clay	(United States) Kathy Rinaldi	(United States) Patty Fendick (United States) Gigi Fernández	5–7, 4–6
Loss	17.	Feb 1993	Auckland Open, New Zealand	Hard	(United States) Kathy Rinaldi	(France) Isabelle Demongeot (South Africa) Elna Reinach	2–6, 4–6
Loss	18.	Mar 1993	Miami Open, United States	Hard	(United States) Kathy Rinaldi	(Latvia) Larisa Neiland (Czech Republic) Jana Novotná	2–6, 5–7
Loss	19.	May 1993	Internationaux de Strasbourg, France	Clay	(United States) Kathy Rinaldi	(United States) Shaun Stafford (Hungary) Andrea Temesvári	7–6^{(5)}, 3–6, 4–6
Win	13.	Feb 1995	Auckland Open, New Zealand	Hard	(South Africa) Elna Reinach	(Italy) Laura Golarsa (Netherlands) Caroline Vis	7–6^{(5)}, 6–2
Win	14.	Nov 1995	Pattaya Open, Thailand	Hard	(Australia) Kristine Kunce	(Australia) Kristin Godridge (Japan) Nana Miyagi	2–6, 6–4, 6–3
Loss	20.	Jan 1996	Auckland Open, Australia	Hard	(Australia) Kristine Kunce	(Belgium) Els Callens (France) Julie Halard-Decugis	1–6, 0–6

== ITF finals ==
$75,000 tournaments
$50,000 tournaments
$25,000 tournaments
$10,000 tournaments

=== Singles (1–0) ===
Result	No.	Date	Tournament	Surface	Opponent	Score
Win	1.	20 April 1992	ITF Baltimore, United States	Hard	(United States) Carol Christian	6–1, 6–4

=== Doubles (6–1) ===
Result	No.	Date	Tournament	Surface	Partner	Opponents	Score
Win	1.	1 July 1983	ITF Pennsylvania, United States	Hard	(Chile) Germaine Ohaco	(United States) Lisa Kearney-Vitalis (United States) Debbie Robb	7–6, 6–4
Win	2.	15 July 1985	ITF Landskrona, Sweden	Clay	(United States) Jaime Kaplan	(Australia) Louise Field (Australia) Janine Thompson	7–5, 6–2
Win	3.	28 September 1987	ITF Bethesda, United States	Hard	(Netherlands) Ingelise Driehuis	(United States) Dena Levy (United States) Jane Thomas	6–1, 6–3
Loss	4.	24 September 1990	ITF Chicago, United States	Hard	(United States) Mary-Lou Daniels	(United States) Katrina Adams (United States) Lynn Nabors	4–6, 4–6
Win	5.	14 October 1990	ITF Salisbury, United States	Hard	(United States) Penny Barg	(United States) Dierdre Herman (United States) Lisa Raymond	6–3, 6–1
Win	6.	20 October 1996	ITF Hayward, United States	Hard	(United States) Kathy Rinaldi	(Australia) Annabel Ellwood (Argentina) Mercedes Paz	7–5, 6–2
Win	7.	27 October 1996	ITF Houston, United States	Hard	(United States) Kathy Rinaldi	(United States) Shannan McCarthy (United States) Meilen Tu	6–1, 6–3

== Performance timelines ==
Key
W	F	SF	QF	#R	RR	Q#	P#	DNQ	A	Z#	PO	G	S	B	NMS	NTI	P	NH

(W) winner; (F) finalist; (SF) semifinalist; (QF) quarterfinalist; (#R) rounds 4, 3, 2, 1; (RR) round-robin stage; (Q#) qualification round; (P#) preliminary round; (DNQ) did not qualify; (A) absent; (Z#) Davis/Fed Cup Zonal Group (with number indication) or (PO) play-off; (G) gold, (S) silver or (B) bronze Olympic/Paralympic medal; (NMS) not a Masters tournament; (NTI) not a Tier I tournament; (P) postponed; (NH) not held; (SR) strike rate (events won / competed); (W–L) win–loss record.
To avoid confusion and double counting, these charts are updated at the conclusion of a tournament or when the player's participation has ended.

=== Singles ===
Tournament	1983	1984	1985	1986	1987	1988	1989	1990	1991	1992	1993	SR	W–L	Win%
Grand Slam tournaments
Australian Open	A	A	A	A	A	1R	2R	1R	Q3	Q3	Q2	0 / 3	1–3	25%
French Open	A	Q1	Q1	A	A	A	A	A	A	A	A	0 / 0	0–0	–
Wimbledon	A	Q2	Q1	A	A	1R	1R	Q1	1R	A	A	0 / 3	0–3	0%
US Open	A	Q3	Q1	A	A	3R	2R	A	Q3	A	A	0 / 2	3–2	60%
Win–loss	0–0	0–0	0–0	0–0	0–0	2–3	2–3	0–1	0–1	0–0	0–0	0 / 8	4–8	33%
National representation
Summer Olympics	NH	2R	Not Held			2R	Not Held			A	NH	0 / 2	2–2	50%
WTA 1000
Indian Wells	A	A	A	A	A	A	A	A	A	A	1R	0 / 1	0–1	0%
Miami Open	A	A	A	A	A	2R	2R	Q1	Q1	Q2	Q1	0 / 2	2–2	50%
Canadian Open	2R	3R	1R	2R	1R	1R	1R	1R	A	A	A	0 / 8	4–8	33%
Win–loss	1–1	2–1	0–1	1–1	0–1	1–2	1–2	0–1	0–0	0–0	0–1	0 / 11	6–11	35%

=== Doubles ===
Tournament	1983	1984	1985	1986	1987	1988	1989	1990	1991	1992	1993	1994	1995	1996	1997	SR	W–L	Win%
Grand Slam tournaments
Australian Open	A	A	A	A	A	2R	F	1R	SF	2R	SF	QF	1R	1R	A	0 / 9	18–9	67%
French Open	A	3R	2R	1R	1R	A	A	A	A	3R	1R	1R	1R	1R	A	0 / 9	5–9	36%
Wimbledon	A	1R	2R	SF	3R	1R	3R	QF	3R	1R	QF	2R	1R	2R	A	0 / 13	19–13	59%
US Open	2R	1R	3R	3R	1R	F	2R	2R	1R	3R	2R	1R	SF	2R	2R	0 / 15	21–15	58%
Win–loss	1–1	2–3	4–3	6–3	2–3	6–3	8–3	4–3	6–3	5–4	8–4	3–4	5–4	1–4	1–1	0 / 46	63–46	58%
National representation
Summer Olympics	NH	A	Not Held			QF	Not Held			A	Not Held			QF	NH	0 / 2	3–2	60%
WTA 1000
Indian Wells	A	A	A	A	A	A	A	2R	A	F	QF	1R	A	2R	A	0 / 5	5–5	50%
Miami Open	A	A	QF	QF	A	3R	3R	2R	QF	F	F	3R	3R	2R	A	0 / 11	20–11	65%
Rome	A	A	A	A	A	A	A	A	A	A	A	2R	1R	2R	A	0 / 3	2–3	40%
Canadian Open	2R	1R	1R	QF	1R	SF	SF	QF	SF	SF	2R	2R	2R	2R	1R	0 / 15	19–15	56%
Win–loss	1–1	0–1	2–2	4–2	0–1	5–2	4–2	2–3	4–2	10–3	6–3	3–4	2–3	3–4	0–1	0 / 34	46–34	58%

=== Mixed doubles ===
Tournament	1984	1985	1986	1987	1988	1989	1990	1991	1992	1993	1994	1995	1996	SR	W–L	Win%
Grand Slam tournaments
Australian Open	A	A	A	A	A	2R	2R	2R	1R	SF	QF	2R	SF	0 / 8	12–8	60%
French Open	A	A	2R	2R	A	A	A	A	QF	QF	QF	F	3R	0 / 7	14–7	67%
Wimbledon	2R	3R	1R	3R	2R	1R	1R	QF	1R	3R	3R	2R	1R	0 / 13	14–13	52%
US Open	1R	1R	A	1R	A	A	1R	QF	SF	QF	SF	1R	2R	0 / 10	11–10	52%
Win–loss	1–2	2–2	1–2	3–3	1–1	1–2	1–3	6–3	5–4	9–4	9–4	7–4	5–4	0 / 38	51–38	57%

== See also ==
- Florida Gators
- List of Florida Gators tennis players
- List of University of Florida alumni
- List of University of Florida Athletic Hall of Fame members
- List of University of Florida Olympians
- Washington Huskies

Awards
Preceded by (Austria) Judith Wiesner	Karen Krantzcke Sportsmanship Award; 1992	Succeeded by (United States) Nicole Arendt
