= 1986 Player's Canadian Open =

- Date: August 11–17 (men); August 18–24 (women)
- Edition: 97th
- Surface: Hard / outdoor
- Location: Toronto, Ontario, Canada (men); Montreal, Quebec, Canada (women)

Champions

Men's singles
- (West Germany) Boris Becker

Women's singles
- (Czechoslovakia) Helena Suková

Men's doubles
- (United States) Chip Hooper / (United States) Mike Leach

Women's doubles
- (United States) Zina Garrison / (Argentina) Gabriela Sabatini
- Canadian Open

The 1986 Player's International Canadian Open was a tennis tournament played on outdoor hard courts. The men's tournament was held at the National Tennis Centre in Toronto, Ontario, and was part of the 1986 Nabisco Grand Prix while the women's tournament was held at the Jarry Park Stadium in Montreal, Quebec, and was part of the 1986 Virginia Slims World Championship Series. The men's tournament was held from August 11 through August 17, 1986, while the women's tournament was held from August 18 through August 24, 1986.

== Finals ==
=== Men's singles ===
(West Germany) Boris Becker defeated (Sweden) Stefan Edberg 6–4, 3–6, 6–3

- It was Becker's 4th title of the year and the 8th of his career.

=== Women's singles ===
(Czechoslovakia) Helena Suková defeated (United States) Pam Shriver 6–2, 7–5

- It was Suková's 8th title of the year and the 20th of her career.

=== Men's doubles ===
(United States) Chip Hooper / (United States) Mike Leach defeated (West Germany) Boris Becker / (Socialist Federal Republic of Yugoslavia) Slobodan Živojinović 6–7, 6–3, 6–3

- It was Hooper's 2nd title of the year and the 4th of his career. It was Leach's 1st title of the year and the 1st of his career.

=== Women's doubles ===
(United States) Zina Garrison / (Argentina) Gabriela Sabatini defeated (United States) Pam Shriver / (Czechoslovakia) Helena Suková 7–6, 5–7, 6–4

- It was Garrison's 3rd title of the year and the 6th of her career. It was Sabatini's 2nd title of the year and the 5th of her career.

== See also ==
- Becker–Edberg rivalry
