= 1984 Player's Canadian Open =

- Date: August 13–19 (men); August 20–26 (women)
- Edition: 95th
- Surface: Hard / outdoor
- Location: Toronto, Ontario, Canada (men); Montreal, Quebec, Canada (women)

Champions

Men's singles
- (United States) John McEnroe

Women's singles
- (United States) Chris Evert-Lloyd

Men's doubles
- (United States) Peter Fleming / (United States) John McEnroe

Women's doubles
- (United States) Kathy Jordan / (Australia) Elizabeth Sayers
- Canadian Open

The 1984 Player's International Canadian Open was a tennis tournament played on outdoor hard courts. The men's tournament was held at the National Tennis Centre in Toronto in Canada and was part of the 1984 Volvo Grand Prix while the women's tournament was held at the Jarry Park Stadium in Montreal in Canada and was part of the 1984 Virginia Slims World Championship Series. The men's tournament was held from August 13 through August 19, 1984, while the women's tournament was held from August 20 through August 26, 1984.

== Finals ==
=== Men's singles ===
(United States) John McEnroe defeated (United States) Vitas Gerulaitis 6–0, 6–3

- It was McEnroe's 13th title of the year and the 108th of his career.

=== Women's singles ===
(United States) Chris Evert-Lloyd defeated (United States) Alycia Moulton 6–2, 7–6

- It was Evert-Lloyd's 4th title of the year and the 134th of her career.

=== Men's doubles ===
(United States) Peter Fleming / (United States) John McEnroe defeated (Australia) John Fitzgerald / (Australia) Kim Warwick 6–4, 6–2

- It was Fleming's 5th title of the year and the 52nd of his career. It was McEnroe's 14th title of the year and the 109th of his career.

=== Women's doubles ===
(United States) Kathy Jordan / (Australia) Elizabeth Sayers defeated (West Germany) Claudia Kohde-Kilsch / (Czechoslovakia) Hana Mandlíková 6–1, 6–2

- It was Jordan's 2nd title of the year and the 25th of her career. It was Sayers' 1st title of the year and the 3rd of her career.
