= 1995 State Farm Evert Cup – Singles =

Singles
- 1995 Newsweek Champions Cup and the State Farm Evert Cup
- 1994 Champion: (Germany) Steffi Graf

Final
- Champion: (United States) Mary Joe Fernández
- Runner-up: (Belarus) Natasha Zvereva
- Score: 6–4, 6–3

Details
- Draw: 28
- Seeds: 4

Events
Singles	men	women
Doubles	men	women
← 1994 ·	Newsweek Champions Cup	· 1996 →
← 1994 ·	State Farm Evert Cup	· 1996 →

Steffi Graf was the defending champion but did not compete that year.

Mary Joe Fernández won in the final 6–4, 6–3 against Natasha Zvereva.

== Seeds ==
A champion seed is indicated in bold text while text in italics indicates the round in which that seed was eliminated. The top four seeds received a bye to the second round.

1. (Spain) Arantxa Sánchez Vicario (semifinals)
2. (Spain) Conchita Martínez (quarterfinals)
3. (United States) Lindsay Davenport (quarterfinals)
4. (Belarus) Natasha Zvereva (final)
5. (Japan) Naoko Sawamatsu (semifinals)
6. (United States) Amy Frazier (first round)
7. (Germany) Sabine Hack (first round)
8. (United States) **Mary Joe Fernández (champion)**

== Draw ==
=== Key ===
- Q = Qualifier
- WC = Wild card
- LL = Lucky loser
- Alt = Alternate
- SE = Special exempt
- PR = Protected ranking
- ITF = ITF entry
- JE = Junior exempt
- w/o = Walkover
- r = Retired
- d = Defaulted
- SR = Special ranking

=== Final ===
Final
4	(Belarus) Natasha Zvereva	4	3
8	(United States) **Mary Joe Fernández**	**6**	**6**

=== Section 1 ===
First round
(United States) A Grossman	1	1
(Indonesia) **Y Basuki**	**6**	**6**
WC	(Netherlands) Y Basting	1	3
(United States) **C Rubin**	**6**	**6**
(South Africa) **A Coetzer**	**6**	**6**
7	(Germany) S Hack	4	4
(United States) **L Raymond**	1	**6**	**6**
(United States) Z Garrison-Jackson	**6**	3	3
Q	(Australia) **R McQuillan**	**7**	2	**6**
(United States) M Werdel	5	**6**	3
(Russia) **E Likhovtseva**	**7**	**6**
6	(United States) A Frazier	6	4

Second round
1	(Spain) **A Sánchez Vicario**	**6**	**6**
(Indonesia) Y Basuki	3	1
(United States) **C Rubin**	**6**	**6**
(South Africa) A Coetzer	4	4
4	(Belarus) **N Zvereva**	**7**	**7**
(United States) L Raymond	5	6
Q	(Australia) R McQuillan	4	2
(Russia) **E Likhovtseva**	**6**	**6**

Quarterfinals
1	(Spain) **A Sánchez Vicario**	**7**	**6**
(United States) C Rubin	6	2
4	(Belarus) **N Zvereva**	**6**	**6**
(Russia) E Likhovtseva	4	0

Semifinals
1	(Spain) A Sánchez Vicario	5	3
4	(Belarus) **N Zvereva**	**7**	**6**

=== Section 2 ===
First round
5	(Japan) **N Sawamatsu**	6	**6**	**6**
(United States) S Stafford	**7**	1	2
(Japan) N Miyagi	3	**6**	1
(United States) **T Whitlinger-Jones**	**6**	2	**6**
Q	(Australia) K Radford	1	2
(Mexico) **A Gavaldón**	**6**	**6**
8	(United States) **M J Fernández**	**6**	**6**
Q	(United States) S Cacic	4	0
Q	(United States) **P Fendick**	**7**	**6**
(United States) G Helgeson-Nielsen	6	3
(Bulgaria) **K Maleeva**	**6**	2	**7**
WC	(United States) M Tu	4	**6**	6

Second round
5	(Japan) **N Sawamatsu**	**6**	**6**
(United States) T Whitlinger-Jones	4	2
(Mexico) A Gavaldón	3	1
3	(United States) **L Davenport**	**6**	**6**
8	(United States) **M J Fernández**	6	**6**	**6**
Q	(United States) P Fendick	**7**	3	2
(Bulgaria) K Maleeva	2	2
2	(Spain) **C Martínez**	**6**	**6**

Quarterfinals
5	(Japan) **N Sawamatsu**	4	**6**	**7**
3	(United States) L Davenport	**6**	4	6
8	(United States) **M J Fernández**	**7**	**6**
2	(Spain) C Martínez	6	2

Semifinals
5	(Japan) N Sawamatsu	4	1
8	(United States) **M J Fernández**	**6**	**6**
