= 1995 State Farm Evert Cup – Doubles =

Doubles
- 1995 Newsweek Champions Cup and the State Farm Evert Cup
- 1994 Champions: (United States) Lindsay Davenport (United States) Lisa Raymond

Final
- Champions: (United States) Lindsay Davenport (United States) Lisa Raymond
- Runners-up: (Latvia) Larisa Neiland (Spain) Arantxa Sánchez Vicario
- Score: 2–6, 6–4, 6–3

Details
- Draw: 16
- Seeds: 4

Events
Singles	men	women
Doubles	men	women
← 1994 ·	Newsweek Champions Cup	· 1996 →
← 1994 ·	State Farm Evert Cup	· 1996 →

Lindsay Davenport and Lisa Raymond were the defending champions and won in the final 2–6, 6–4, 6–3 against Larisa Neiland and Arantxa Sánchez Vicario.

== Seeds ==
Champion seeds are indicated in bold text while text in italics indicates the round in which those seeds were eliminated.

1. (Latvia) Larisa Neiland / (Spain) Arantxa Sánchez Vicario (final)
2. (United States) **Lindsay Davenport** / (United States) **Lisa Raymond (champions)**
3. (Netherlands) Manon Bollegraf / (Belarus) Natasha Zvereva (semifinals)
4. (United States) Patty Fendick / (United States) Mary Joe Fernández (quarterfinals)

== Draw ==
=== Key ===
- Q = Qualifier
- WC = Wild card
- LL = Lucky loser
- Alt = Alternate
- SE = Special exempt
- PR = Protected ranking
- ITF = ITF entry
- JE = Junior exempt
- w/o = Walkover
- r = Retired
- d = Defaulted
- SR = Special ranking

First round
1	(Latvia) **L Neiland** (Spain) **A Sánchez Vicario**	**7**	**6**
(Australia) N Bradtke (Australia) K Radford	6	1
(United States) D Graham (United States) R White	3	1
WC	(United States) **L Poruri** (United States) **M Tu**	**6**	**6**
4	(United States) **P Fendick** (United States) **M J Fernández**	**6**	**6**
(Russia) E Likhovtseva (United States) D Scott	4	1
(Bulgaria) K Maleeva (United States) C Rubin	3	3
(Indonesia) **Y Basuki** (Japan) **N Miyagi**	**6**	**6**
(South Africa) **A Coetzer** (South Africa) **E Reinach**	**6**	**6**
LL	(United States) A Grossman (United States) S Stafford	1	2
(United States) K Adams (United States) Z Garrison-Jackson	2	4
3	(Netherlands) **M Bollegraf** (Belarus) **N Zvereva**	**6**	**6**
(United States) G Helgeson-Nielsen (Australia) R McQuillan	6	1
(United States) **A Frazier** (United States) **K Po**	**7**	**6**
(Spain) C Martínez (Argentina) P Tarabini	3	3
2	(United States) **L Davenport** (United States) **L Raymond**	**6**	**6**

Quarterfinals
1	(Latvia) **L Neiland** (Spain) **A Sánchez Vicario**	**6**	**6**
WC	(United States) L Poruri (United States) M Tu	2	2
4	(United States) P Fendick (United States) M J Fernández	1	3
(Indonesia) **Y Basuki** (Japan) **N Miyagi**	**6**	**6**
(South Africa) A Coetzer (South Africa) E Reinach	1	4
3	(Netherlands) **M Bollegraf** (Belarus) **N Zvereva**	**6**	**6**
(United States) A Frazier (United States) K Po	0	1
2	(United States) **L Davenport** (United States) **L Raymond**	**6**	**6**

Semifinals
1	(Latvia) **L Neiland** (Spain) **A Sánchez Vicario**	**6**	**6**
(Indonesia) Y Basuki (Japan) N Miyagi	4	3
3	(Netherlands) M Bollegraf (Belarus) N Zvereva	1	4
2	(United States) **L Davenport** (United States) **L Raymond**	**6**	**6**

Final
1	(Latvia) Larisa Neiland (Spain) Arantxa Sánchez Vicario	**6**	4	3
2	(United States) **Lindsay Davenport** (United States) **Lisa Raymond**	2	**6**	**6**
