= 1994 Evert Cup – Doubles =

Doubles
- 1994 Newsweek Champions Cup and the Evert Cup
- 1993 Champions: (Australia) Rennae Stubbs (Czech Republic) Helena Suková

Final
- Champions: (United States) Lindsay Davenport (United States) Lisa Raymond
- Runners-up: (Netherlands) Manon Bollegraf (Czech Republic) Helena Suková
- Score: 6–2, 6–4

Details
- Draw: 16
- Seeds: 4

Events
Singles	men	women
Doubles	men	women
← 1993 ·	Newsweek Champions Cup	· 1995 →
← 1993 ·	Evert Cup	· 1995 →

Rennae Stubbs and Helena Suková were the defending champions but they competed with different partners that year, Stubbs with Mary Joe Fernández and Suková with Manon Bollegraf.

Fernández and Stubbs lost in the semifinals to Bollegraf and Suková.

Bollegraf and Suková lost in the final 6–2, 6–4 against Lindsay Davenport and Lisa Raymond.

== Seeds ==
Champion seeds are indicated in bold text while text in italics indicates the round in which those seeds were eliminated.

1. (United States) Gigi Fernández / (Belarus) Natasha Zvereva (quarterfinals)
2. (Netherlands) Manon Bollegraf / (Czech Republic) Helena Suková (final)
3. (United States) Mary Joe Fernández / (Australia) Rennae Stubbs (semifinals)
4. (Canada) Jill Hetherington / (United States) Kathy Rinaldi-Stunkel (first round)

== Draw ==
=== Key ===
- Q = Qualifier
- WC = Wild card
- LL = Lucky loser
- Alt = Alternate
- SE = Special exempt
- PR = Protected ranking
- ITF = ITF entry
- JE = Junior exempt
- w/o = Walkover
- r = Retired
- d = Defaulted
- SR = Special ranking

First round
1	(United States) **G Fernández** (Belarus) **N Zvereva**	**7**	**6**
(United States) A Grossman (New Zealand) J Richardson	5	2
(United States) **L Davenport** (United States) **L Raymond**	**6**	**6**
(United Kingdom) J Harper (Slovakia) R Zrubáková	2	3
4	(Canada) J Hetherington (United States) K Rinaldi-Stunkel	5	**6**	4
(South Africa) **A Coetzer** (Croatia) **I Majoli**	**7**	0	**6**
Q	(United States) **A Frazier** (United States) **K Po**	**6**	**6**
(South Africa) R Fairbank-Nideffer (United States) R White	1	2
(United States) **G Helgeson** (Australia) **K Radford**	**6**	**6**
(Russia) E Likhovtseva (Croatia) M Murić	2	1
(United States) S Collins (South Africa) M de Swardt	3	2
3	(United States) **M J Fernández** (Australia) **R Stubbs**	**6**	**6**
WC	(United States) T Austin (United States) B Nagelsen	5	2
(Ukraine) **N Medvedeva** (Netherlands) **M Oremans**	**7**	**6**
(United States) L Harvey-Wild (South Africa) E Reinach	4	3
2	(Netherlands) **M Bollegraf** (Czech Republic) **H Suková**	**6**	**6**

Quarterfinals
1	(United States) G Fernández (Belarus) N Zvereva	4	4
(United States) **L Davenport** (United States) **L Raymond**	**6**	**6**
(South Africa) A Coetzer (Croatia) I Majoli	**6**	2	1
Q	(United States) **A Frazier** (United States) **K Po**	1	**6**	**6**
(United States) G Helgeson (Australia) K Radford	4	3
3	(United States) **M J Fernández** (Australia) **R Stubbs**	**6**	**6**
(Ukraine) N Medvedeva (Netherlands) M Oremans	3	3
2	(Netherlands) **M Bollegraf** (Czech Republic) **H Suková**	**6**	**6**

Semifinals
(United States) **L Davenport** (United States) **L Raymond**	**6**	**6**
Q	(United States) A Frazier (United States) K Po	4	4
3	(United States) M J Fernández (Australia) R Stubbs	**7**	4	2
2	(Netherlands) **M Bollegraf** (Czech Republic) **H Suková**	5	**6**	**6**

Final
(United States) **Lindsay Davenport** (United States) **Lisa Raymond**	**6**	**6**
2	(Netherlands) Manon Bollegraf (Czech Republic) Helena Suková	2	4
