= 1994 Evert Cup – Singles =

Singles
- 1994 Newsweek Champions Cup and the Evert Cup
- 1993 Champion: (United States) Mary Joe Fernández

Final
- Champion: (Germany) Steffi Graf
- Runner-up: (South Africa) Amanda Coetzer
- Score: 6–0, 6–4

Details
- Draw: 32
- Seeds: 8

Events
| Singles | men | women |
| Doubles | men | women |
- Newsweek Champions Cup Evert Cup

Mary Joe Fernández was the defending champion but lost in the quarterfinals to Amanda Coetzer.

Steffi Graf won in the final 6–0, 6–4 against Coetzer.

== Seeds ==
A champion seed is indicated in bold text while text in italics indicates the round in which that seed was eliminated.

1. (Germany) **Steffi Graf (champion)**
2. (United States) Mary Joe Fernández (quarterfinals)
3. (United States) Lindsay Davenport (semifinals)
4. (Belarus) Natasha Zvereva (quarterfinals)
5. (Czech Republic) Helena Suková (first round)
6. (South Africa) Amanda Coetzer (final)
7. (Germany) Sabine Hack (first round)
8. (Austria) Judith Wiesner (quarterfinals)

== Draw ==
Key

- Q = Qualifier
- WC = Wild card
- LL = Lucky loser
- Alt = Alternate
- ITF = ITF entry
- PR = Protected ranking
- SR = Special ranking
- SE = Special exempt
- JE = Junior exempt
- JR = Junior Accelerator Programme entrant
- CO = College Accelerator Programme entrant
- NG = Next Gen Accelerator Program entrant
- w/o = Walkover
- r = Retired
- d = Defaulted

First round
1 | (Germany) **S Graf** | **6** | **6**
(United States) G Fernández | 1 | 2
(Slovakia) R Zrubáková | 2 | **7** | 3
WC | (United States) **T Austin** | **6** | 5 | **6**
(United States) **G Helgeson** | **6** | **6**
(Netherlands) S Rottier | 4 | 0
(Russia) **E Likhovtseva** | **6** | **7**
5 | (Czech Republic) H Suková | 1 | 5
4 | (Belarus) **N Zvereva** | **6** | **6**
WC | (United States) B Nagelsen | 0 | 1
(United States) **L Harvey-Wild** | **6** | **6**
(United States) M Werdel | 4 | 4
(United States) **L Raymond** | 6 | **6** | **6**
(Netherlands) M Oremans | **7** | 1 | 4
(Croatia) **I Majoli** | **6** | 4 | **7**
7 | (Germany) S Hack | 3 | **6** | 6
8 | (Austria) **J Wiesner** | **6** | **6**
(United States) A Frazier | 1 | 3
(South Africa) R Fairbank-Nideffer | 2 | 4
(United States) **T Whitlinger** | **6** | **6**
(United States) K Po | 4 | 3
(South Africa) **E Reinach** | **6** | **6**
(Ukraine) N Medvedeva | 4 | 1
3 | (United States) **L Davenport** | **6** | **6**
6 | (South Africa) **A Coetzer** | **6** | **6**
(United States) A Grossman | 4 | 2
Q | (Canada) J Nejedly | 2 | 0
(United States) **R White** | **6** | **6**
Q | (United States) **A Mall** | **6** | **6**
LL | (Romania) C Cristea | 4 | 1
(Mexico) A Gavaldón | 3 | 3
2 | (United States) **M J Fernández** | **6** | **6**

Second round
1 | (Germany) **S Graf** | **6** | **6**
WC | (United States) T Austin | 0 | 0
(United States) **G Helgeson** | **6** | **6**
(Russia) E Likhovtseva | 0 | 2
4 | (Belarus) **N Zvereva** | **6** | **6**
(United States) L Harvey-Wild | 3 | 3
(United States) L Raymond | 3 | **6** | 1
(Croatia) **I Majoli** | **6** | 2 | **6**
8 | (Austria) **J Wiesner** | **6** | **7**
(United States) T Whitlinger | 3 | 6
(South Africa) E Reinach | 2 | 1
3 | (United States) **L Davenport** | **6** | **6**
6 | (South Africa) **A Coetzer** | **6** | **6**
(United States) R White | 2 | 1
Q | (United States) A Mall | 4 | 6
2 | (United States) **M J Fernández** | **6** | **7**

Quarterfinals
1 | (Germany) **S Graf** | **6** | **6**
(United States) G Helgeson | 1 | 3
4 | (Belarus) N Zvereva | 3 | 6
(Croatia) **I Majoli** | **6** | **7**
8 | (Austria) J Wiesner | **6** | 6 | 0
3 | (United States) **L Davenport** | 4 | **7** | **6**
6 | (South Africa) **A Coetzer** | **6** | 2 | **7**
2 | (United States) M J Fernández | 2 | **6** | 6

Semifinals
1 | (Germany) **S Graf** | **6** | **6**
(Croatia) I Majoli | 4 | 1
3 | (United States) L Davenport | **6** | 3 | 4
6 | (South Africa) **A Coetzer** | 4 | **6** | **6**

Final
1 | (Germany) **Steffi Graf** | **6** | **6**
6 | (South Africa) Amanda Coetzer | 0 | 4
