= Michael Joyce (tennis) =

American tennis player

- Country (sports): United States
- Residence: Boca Raton, Florida, United States
- Born: February 1, 1973 (age 53) Santa Monica, California, United States
- Height: 5 ft 11 in (1.80 m)
- Turned pro: 1991
- Retired: 2003
- Plays: Right-handed (two-handed backhand)
- Prize money: $756,999

Singles
- Career record: 46–67
- Career titles: 0
- Highest ranking: No. 64 (April 8, 1996)

Grand Slam singles results
- Australian Open: 2R (1996, 1997)
- French Open: 1R (1998)
- Wimbledon: 4R (1995)
- US Open: 2R (1991, 1993)

Doubles
- Career record: 8–21
- Career titles: 0
- Highest ranking: No. 181 (June 9, 2003)

Grand Slam doubles results
- Wimbledon: 1R (1995)
- US Open: 1R (1993, 1995, 1996)
- Last updated on: October 9, 2021.

Michael T. Joyce (born February 1, 1973) is an American coach and former tennis player. The right-hander reached his highest ATP singles ranking of world No. 64 in April 1996.

== Tennis career ==
=== Juniors ===
Joyce and then-friend Erik Menendez entered the 1989 Boys' Junior National Tennis Championship, shortly before Erik and his brother Lyle were charged with the murder of the Menendez’ parents. Joyce beat Ian Williams in the 1st round of the Boys' 18 singles but lost to Jonathan Stark in the quarterfinals. He reached the finals of the Wimbledon Boys' event in 1991, losing to Thomas Enqvist.

=== Professional tennis player ===
On the professional tour, he won 3 Challenger events and reached the 4th round of the 1995 Wimbledon Championships defeating Marc Rosset, Jordi Burillo and Chris Wilkinson, before being defeated by Shuzo Matsuoka. He won the men's singles in the Ojai Tennis Tournament in 2004. Pat Rafter, Yevgeny Kafelnikov, Jim Courier, and Michael Chang were among those Joyce beat. He was 46–67 overall, going 1–10 against top 10 players.

He was the subject of an essay by David Foster Wallace in Esquire; the essay was later republished in Wallace's collections A Supposedly Fun Thing I'll Never Do Again and String Theory.

== Coaching ==
Joyce was the coach of Maria Sharapova, along with her father, Yuri Sharapov, from summer 2004 until January 2011, when he was replaced by Thomas Högstedt. During his tenure, Sharapova won three Grand Slam singles titles and reached the World No. 1 ranking.

Joyce coached American tennis player Jessica Pegula from 2012 to 2017. While with Joyce, in 2013 before suffering from an injury, Pegula reached a career high singles world ranking of 123 and a doubles world ranking of 92.

In 2017, Joyce coached former world number one Victoria Azarenka for 8 months after she returned to competition following maternity leave. However, with family issues interrupting her schedule, the pair split at the end of the year, and Joyce took up the position of coach to Johanna Konta. In October 2018, Joyce split ways with Konta and began coaching Eugenie Bouchard. In April 2019, Joyce split ways with Bouchard; two months later he started to work with Tímea Babos. In 2021, Joyce joined USTA Player Development as a women's tennis national coach.

He coached Ashlyn Krueger from 2021 to 2025.

In January 2026, it was announced that Katie Boulter had hired Joyce as her new coach.

== ATP Challenger and ITF Futures finals ==
=== Singles: 10 (6–4) ===
Legend ATP Challenger (3–3) ITF Futures (3–1)	Finals by surface Hard (6–4) Clay (0–0) Grass (0–0) Carpet (0–0)

Result	W–L	Date	Tournament	Tier	Surface	Opponent	Score
Win	1–0	Apr 1994	Puerto Vallarta, Mexico	Challenger	Hard	(Mexico) Leonardo Lavalle	6–1, 7–6
Loss	1–1	Sep 1994	Seoul, South Korea	Challenger	Hard	(South Africa) David Nainkin	7–6, 3–6, 5–7
Loss	1–2	Nov 1994	Glendale, United States	Challenger	Hard	(Norway) Christian Ruud	1–6, 3–6
Win	2–2	Dec 1994	[São Luís, Brazil	Challenger	Hard	(The Bahamas) Roger Smith	6–3, 6–7, 7–6
Win	3–2	Dec 1998	USA F10, Phoenix	Futures	Hard	(United States) Thomas Blake	6–4, 6–4
Win	4–2	Mar 2000	[Hamilton, New Zealand	Challenger	Hard	(Japan) Gouichi Motomura	4–6, 6–4, 6–4
Loss	4–3	Sep 2001	Tarzana, United States	Challenger	Hard	(United States) Levar Harper-Griffith	6–7^{(6–8)}, 3–6
Win	5–3	Nov 2002	USA F27, Hammond	Futures	Hard	(United States) Tripp Phillips	7–6^{(10–8)}, 7–6^{(7–1)}
Win	6–3	Feb 2003	Great Britain F4, Redbridge	Futures	Hard	(Italy) Stefano Pescosolido	6–4, 3–6, 6–2
Loss	6–4	Mar 2003	USA F6, Mobile	Futures	Hard	(Republic of Ireland) Peter Clarke	6–7^{(6–8)}, 4–6

=== Doubles: 11 (4–7) ===
Legend ATP Challenger (2–6) ITF Futures (2–1)	Finals by surface Hard (4–5) Clay (0–0) Grass (0–0) Carpet (0–2)

Result	W–L	Date	Tournament	Tier	Surface	Partner	Opponents	Score
Loss	0–1	Jan 1997	Singapore, Singapore	Challenger	Hard	(United States) Scott Melville	(India) Mahesh Bhupathi (India) Leander Paes	4–6, 6–4, 6–7
Loss	0–2	Jul 1997	Flushing Meadows, United States	Challenger	Hard	(United States) David Witt	(United States) Geoff Grant (United States) Mark Merklein	1–6, 4–6
Loss	0–3	Oct 1999	Japan F6, Fukuoka	Futures	Carpet	(United Kingdom) Kyle Spencer	(Japan) Tasuku Iwami (Japan) Ryuso Tsujino	6–4, 6–7, 4–6
Loss	0–4	Nov 1999	Yokohama, Japan	Challenger	Carpet	(United Kingdom) Kyle Spencer	(Japan) Satoshi Iwabuchi (Japan) Thomas Shimada	2–6, 4–6
Loss	0–5	Mar 2000	[Hamilton, New Zealand	Challenger	Hard	(United States) Jim Thomas	(South Africa) Neville Godwin (Australia) Michael Hill	6–7^{(4–7)}, 4–6
Win	1–5	Jul 2000	USA F17, Chico	Futures	Hard	(Australia) Luke Smith	(United States) Zack Fleishman (United States) Robert Kendrick	7–6^{(7–3)}, 6–7^{(3–7)}, 6–1
Win	2–5	Sep 2001	Tarzana, United States	Challenger	Hard	(United States) Zack Fleishman	(United Kingdom) Kyle Spencer (United States) Glenn Weiner	6–1, 5–7, 7–6^{(8–6)}
Win	3–5	Jul 2002	Granby, Canada	Challenger	Hard	(Israel) Noam Behr	(France) Thomas Dupre (Canada) Simon Larose	6–0, 6–3
Loss	3–6	Aug 2002	Belo Horizonte, Brazil	Challenger	Hard	(Russia) Denis Golovanov	(Brazil) Daniel Melo (Brazil) Marcelo Melo	3–6, 4–6
Loss	3–7	Aug 2002	Gramado, Brazil	Challenger	Hard	(Russia) Denis Golovanov	(Brazil) Alessandro Guevara (Australia) Dejan Petrovic	6–3, 5–7, 2–6
Win	4–7	Mar 2003	USA F6, Mobile	Futures	Hard	(United States) Kevin Kim	(Brazil) Josh Goffi (United States) Travis Parrott	6–7^{(0–7)}, 6–3, 7–5

== Junior Grand Slam finals ==
=== Singles: 1 (1 runner-up) ===
Result	Year	Championships	Surface	Opponent	Score
Loss	1991	Wimbledon	Grass	(Sweden) Thomas Enqvist	4–6, 2–6

== Performance timelines ==
Key
W	F	SF	QF	#R	RR	Q#	DNQ	A	NH

(W) winner; (F) finalist; (SF) semifinalist; (QF) quarterfinalist; (#R) rounds 4, 3, 2, 1; (RR) round-robin stage; (Q#) qualification round; (DNQ) did not qualify; (A) absent; (NH) not held; (SR) strike rate (events won / competed); (W–L) win–loss record.

=== Singles ===
Tournament	1991	1992	1993	1994	1995	1996	1997	1998	1999	2000	2001	2002	2003	SR	W–L	Win %
Grand Slam tournaments
Australian Open	A	Q1	A	Q2	A	2R	2R	A	Q3	A	Q2	A	A	0 / 2	2–2	50%
French Open	A	A	A	Q1	A	1R	A	Q1	A	Q1	A	A	A	0 / 1	0–1	0%
Wimbledon	A	A	Q2	Q1	4R	1R	Q2	Q1	Q3	Q1	Q1	Q1	Q1	0 / 2	3–2	60%
US Open	2R	Q1	2R	A	1R	1R	1R	Q2	Q2	Q1	Q3	Q1	Q1	0 / 5	2–5	29%
Win–loss	1–1	0–0	1–1	0–0	3–2	1–4	1–2	0–0	0–0	0–0	0–0	0–0	0–0	0 / 10	7–10	41%
ATP Tour Masters 1000
Indian Wells Masters	A	A	A	A	Q1	3R	Q2	Q2	A	A	A	Q1	Q1	0 / 1	2–1	67%
Miami Open	A	A	Q3	Q2	3R	QF	1R	A	A	A	A	A	A	0 / 3	6–3	67%
Canada Masters	A	A	A	A	2R	A	A	A	Q2	Q1	A	A	A	0 / 1	1–1	50%
Cincinnati Masters	A	A	A	A	A	1R	A	A	Q2	Q1	A	A	A	0 / 1	0–1	0%
Win–loss	0–0	0–0	0–0	0–0	3–2	6–3	0–1	0–0	0–0	0–0	0–0	0–0	0–0	0 / 6	9–6	60%

=== Doubles ===
Tournament	1993	1994	1995	1996	1997	1998	1999	SR	W–L	Win %
Grand Slam tournaments
Australian Open	A	A	A	A	A	A	A	0 / 0	0–0	–
French Open	A	A	A	A	A	A	A	0 / 0	0–0	–
Wimbledon	Q2	A	1R	A	A	Q2	A	0 / 1	0–1	0%
US Open	1R	A	1R	1R	A	Q1	Q1	0 / 3	0–3	0%
Win–loss	0–1	0–0	0–2	0–1	0–0	0–0	0–0	0 / 4	0–4	0%
ATP Tour Masters 1000
Indian Wells Masters	A	A	A	Q1	A	A	A	0 / 0	0–0	–
Miami Open	A	A	Q2	A	A	A	A	0 / 0	0–0	–
Canada Masters	A	A	A	A	A	A	2R	0 / 1	1–1	50%
Win–loss	0–0	0–0	0–0	0–0	0–0	0–0	1–1	0 / 1	1–1	50%
