= 1996 Newsweek Champions Cup and the State Farm Evert Cup =

1996 Newsweek Champions Cup and State Farm Evert Cup
- Date: March 8–17, 1996
- Edition: 23rd
- Category: Super 9 (ATP); Tier I Series (WTA)
- Prize money: $1,950,000
- Surface: Hard / outdoor
- Location: Indian Wells, CA, US
- Venue: Grand Champions Resort

Champions

Men's singles
- (United States) Michael Chang

Women's singles
- (Germany) Steffi Graf

Men's doubles
- (Australia) Todd Woodbridge / (Australia) Mark Woodforde

Women's doubles
- (United States) Chanda Rubin / (Netherlands) Brenda Schultz-McCarthy
| ← 1995 · | Newsweek Champions Cup | · 1997 → |
| ← 1995 · | State Farm Evert Cup | · 1997 → |

The 1996 Newsweek Champions Cup and the State Farm Evert Cup were tennis tournaments played on outdoor hard courts that were part of the Mercedes Super 9 of the 1996 ATP Tour and of Tier I of the 1996 WTA Tour. Both the men's and women's events took place at the Grand Champions Resort in Indian Wells, California in the United States from March 8 through March 17, 1996.

The men's singles was headlined by ATP No. 1, Memphis, San Jose titlist and 1994 and 1995 winner Pete Sampras, Mexico City champion, 1995 French Open runner-up and Doha semifinalist Thomas Muster and San Jose runner-up, U.S. Open defending champion and 1990 Indian Wells winner Andre Agassi. Other top seeds were Australian Open and 1995 Tour Championships titlist Boris Becker, Michael Chang, Goran Ivanišević, Jim Courier and Thomas Enqvist.

== Finals ==
=== Men's singles ===
(United States) Michael Chang defeated (Netherlands) Paul Haarhuis 7–5, 6–1, 6–1

- It was Chang's 1st title of the year and the 24th of his career. It was his 2nd win at the event, having also won in 1992.

=== Women's singles ===
(Germany) Steffi Graf defeated (Spain) Conchita Martínez 7–6^{(7–5)}, 7–6^{(7–5)}

- It was Graf's 1st title of the year and the 96th of her career. It was her 2nd win at the event, having also won in 1994.

=== Men's doubles ===
(Australia) Todd Woodbridge / (Australia) Mark Woodforde defeated (United States) Brian MacPhie / (Australia) Michael Tebbutt 1–6, 6–2, 6–2

- It was Woodbridge's 3rd title of the year and the 43rd of his career. It was Woodforde's 4th title of the year and the 47th of his career.

=== Women's doubles ===
(United States) Chanda Rubin / (Netherlands) Brenda Schultz-McCarthy defeated (France) Julie Halard-Decugis / (France) Nathalie Tauziat 6–1, 6–4

- It was Rubin's 3rd title of the year and the 6th of her career. It was Schultz-McCarthy's 3rd title of the year and the 12th of her career.
