= 1997 Newsweek Champions Cup – Singles =

Singles
- 1997 Newsweek Champions Cup

Final
- Champion: (United States) Michael Chang
- Runner-up: (Czech Republic) Bohdan Ulihrach
- Score: 4–6, 6–3, 6–4, 6–3

Details
- Draw: 56 (6WC/7Q/1LL)
- Seeds: 16

Events
Singles	Doubles
← 1996 ·	Indian Wells Masters	· 1998 →

Defending champion Michael Chang defeated Bohdan Ulihrach in the final, 4–6, 6–3, 6–4, 6–3 to win the men's singles tennis title at the 1997 Indian Wells Masters.

== Seeds ==
The top eight seeds received a bye to the second round.

1. (United States) Pete Sampras (second round)
2. (Austria) Thomas Muster (semifinals)
3. (United States) Michael Chang (champion)
4. (Croatia) Goran Ivanišević (second round)
5. (Chile) Marcelo Ríos (second round)
6. (Sweden) Thomas Enqvist (second round)
7. (South Africa) Wayne Ferreira (second round)
8. (Spain) Carlos Moyá (third round)
9. (Spain) Albert Costa (first round)
10. (United States) Andre Agassi (first round)
11. (United States) ~~Todd Martin~~ (withdrew)
12. (Spain) Félix Mantilla (first round)
13. (Switzerland) Marc Rosset (third round)
14. (Spain) Alberto Berasategui (quarterfinals)
15. (Spain) Àlex Corretja (second round, retired)
16. (United States) Jim Courier (first round)

== Draw ==
=== Key ===
- Q = Qualifier
- WC = Wild card
- LL = Lucky loser
- Alt = Alternate
- ITF = ITF entry
- PR = Protected ranking
- SR = Special ranking
- SE = Special exempt
- JE = Junior exempt
- JR = Junior Accelerator Programme entrant
- CO = College Accelerator Programme entrant
- NG = Next Gen Accelerator Program entrant
- w/o = Walkover
- r = Retired
- d = Defaulted

=== Finals ===
Quarterfinals
(Czech Republic) Bohdan Ulihrach	6	6
(Zimbabwe) Byron Black	4	2
14	(Spain) Alberto Berasategui	2	3
(Sweden) Jonas Björkman	6	6
(France) Cédric Pioline	3	2
3	(United States) Michael Chang	6	6
(Australia) Mark Philippoussis	3	6^{8}
2	(Austria) Thomas Muster	6	7^{10}

Semifinals
(Czech Republic) Bohdan Ulihrach	6	6
(Sweden) Jonas Björkman	3	2
3	(United States) Michael Chang	6	7^{7}
2	(Austria) Thomas Muster	1	6^{1}

Final
(Czech Republic) Bohdan Ulihrach	6	3	4	3
3	(United States) Michael Chang	4	6	6	6

=== Top half ===
==== Section 1 ====
First round
(Czech Republic) B Ulihrach	4	6	6
(Argentina) H Gumy	6	1	0
(United States) R Reneberg	4	7	4
(Spain) J Sánchez	6	5	6
(Spain) F Clavet	6	4	6
16	(United States) J Courier	4	6	4
9	(Spain) A Costa	2	2
(Zimbabwe) B Black	6	6
(Spain) S Bruguera	4	4
(United States) A O'Brien	6	6
Q	(Brazil) G Kuerten	6	7^{7}
(Australia) M Woodforde	4	6^{3}

Second round
1	(United States) P Sampras	6^{5}	5
(Czech Republic) B Ulihrach	7^{7}	7
(Spain) J Sánchez	4	6	6^{6}
(Spain) F Clavet	6	4	7^{8}
(Zimbabwe) B Black	3	6	7^{7}
(United States) A O'Brien	6	1	6^{3}
Q	(Brazil) G Kuerten	7^{7}	1	6
7	(South Africa) W Ferreira	6^{5}	6	3

Third round
(Czech Republic) B Ulihrach	7	7^{7}
(Spain) F Clavet	5	6^{5}
(Zimbabwe) B Black	6	6
Q	(Brazil) G Kuerten	3	3

Quarterfinals
(Czech Republic) B Ulihrach	6	6
(Zimbabwe) B Black	4	2

==== Section 2 ====
First round
WC	(United States) J Stark	7^{8}	6
(Norway) C Ruud	6^{6}	2
Q	(Sweden) N Kulti	6	6
(Ukraine) A Medvedev	4	4
Q	(Canada) S Lareau	6^{5}	6^{6}
14	(Spain) A Berasategui	7^{7}	7^{8}
LL	(Sweden) M Tillström	3	3
Q	(United States) J Tarango	6	6
(Sweden) J Björkman	6	6
(Italy) A Gaudenzi	1	3
WC	(United States) J Gimelstob	4	7^{9}	3
(United States) C Woodruff	6	6^{7}	6

Second round
4	(Croatia) G Ivanišević	5	3
WC	(United States) J Stark	7	6
Q	(Sweden) N Kulti	3	7^{8}	3
14	(Spain) A Berasategui	6	6^{6}	6
Q	(United States) J Tarango	4	2
(Sweden) J Björkman	6	6
(United States) C Woodruff	6	6
6	(Sweden) T Enqvist	4	4

Third round
WC	(United States) J Stark	6^{6}	3
14	(Spain) A Berasategui	7^{8}	6
(Sweden) J Björkman	2	7	6
(United States) C Woodruff	6	5	1

Quarterfinals
14	(Spain) A Berasategui	2	3
(Sweden) J Björkman	6	6

=== Bottom half ===
==== Section 3 ====
First round
(United States) V Spadea	4	3
WC	(Sweden) M Larsson	6	6
(France) C Pioline	6	6
(Australia) J Stoltenberg	4	4
(Australia) S Stolle	0	6	6
12	(Spain) F Mantilla	6	3	3
13	(Switzerland) M Rosset	6	7
WC	(Argentina) M Zabaleta	3	5
(Germany) H Dreekmann	7^{7}	6
(Australia) P Rafter	6^{3}	3
Q	(Netherlands) S Schalken	7^{7}	6
Q	(India) L Paes	6^{5}	2

Second round
5	(Chile) M Ríos	3	7	6^{2}
WC	(Sweden) M Larsson	6	5	7^{7}
(France) C Pioline	6	6
(Australia) S Stolle	4	4
13	(Switzerland) M Rosset	3	6	7^{7}
(Germany) H Dreekmann	6	3	6^{4}
Q	(Netherlands) S Schalken	4	3
3	(United States) M Chang	6	6

Third round
WC	(Sweden) M Larsson	7^{8}	2	4
(France) C Pioline	6^{6}	6	6
13	(Switzerland) M Rosset	2	5
3	(United States) M Chang	6	7

Quarterfinals
(France) C Pioline	3	2
3	(United States) M Chang	6	6

==== Section 4 ====
First round
(Germany) M-K Goellner	7	4	2
WC	(Czech Republic) J Novák	5	6	6
(Slovakia) D Hrbatý	5	7	2
WC	(Australia) T Woodbridge	7	5	6
(Australia) M Philippoussis	7^{7}	7^{7}
10	(United States) A Agassi	6^{5}	6^{5}
15	(Spain) À Corretja	6	6
Q	(Brazil) F Meligeni	3	3
(Netherlands) P Haarhuis	7^{7}	2	1
(Czech Republic) C Doseděl	6^{5}	6	6
(France) G Forget	6	4^{r}
(Romania) A Voinea	4	2

Second round
8	(Spain) C Moyá	6	6
WC	(Czech Republic) J Novák	4	2
WC	(Australia) T Woodbridge	6^{4}	6^{9}
(Australia) M Philippoussis	7^{7}	7^{11}
15	(Spain) À Corretja	4	1^{r}
(Czech Republic) C Doseděl	6	4
(Romania) A Voinea	2	4
2	(Austria) T Muster	6	6

Third round
8	(Spain) C Moyá	4	3
(Australia) M Philippoussis	6	6
(Czech Republic) C Doseděl	4	4
2	(Austria) T Muster	6	6

Quarterfinals
(Australia) M Philippoussis	3	6^{8}
2	(Austria) T Muster	6	7^{10}

== Qualifying ==
=== Qualifying seeds ===
1. (Sweden) Mikael Tillström (qualifying competition, Lucky loser)
2. (Netherlands) Sjeng Schalken (qualified)
3. (Spain) Carlos Costa (first round)
4. (Sweden) Nicklas Kulti (qualified)
5. (United States) Jeff Tarango (qualified)
6. (Austria) Gilbert Schaller (qualifying competition)
7. (Spain) Juan Albert Viloca (first round)
8. (Brazil) Gustavo Kuerten (qualified)
9. (Brazil) Fernando Meligeni (qualified)
10. (Australia) Scott Draper (first round)
11. (Uruguay) Marcelo Filippini (first round)
12. (France) Lionel Roux (first round)
13. (Armenia) Sargis Sargsian (qualifying competition)
14. (Spain) Galo Blanco (first round)

=== Qualifiers ===
1. (Canada) Sébastien Lareau
2. (Netherlands) Sjeng Schalken
3. (India) Leander Paes
4. (Sweden) Nicklas Kulti
5. (United States) Jeff Tarango
6. (Brazil) Gustavo Kuerten
7. (Brazil) Fernando Meligeni

=== Lucky loser ===
1. (Sweden) Mikael Tillström

=== Qualifying draw ===
==== First qualifier ====
First round
1	(Sweden) Mikael Tillström	6	6	7
(United States) Doug Flach	3	7	6
(Canada) Sébastien Lareau	6	6
14	(Spain) Galo Blanco	1	4

Qualifying competition
1	(Sweden) Mikael Tillström	4	6
(Canada) Sébastien Lareau	6	7

==== Second qualifier ====
First round
2	(Netherlands) Sjeng Schalken	6	6
(Argentina) Lucas Arnold Ker	4	4
WC	(Germany) Tommy Haas	4	7	1
13	(Armenia) Sargis Sargsian	6	6	6

Qualifying competition
2	(Netherlands) Sjeng Schalken	6	1	6
13	(Armenia) Sargis Sargsian	2	6	3

==== Third qualifier ====
First round
3	(Spain) Carlos Costa	3	6	6
(South Africa) Marcos Ondruska	6	1	7
(India) Leander Paes	2	7	6
12	(France) Lionel Roux	6	6	3

Qualifying competition
(South Africa) Marcos Ondruska	4	4
(India) Leander Paes	6	6

==== Fourth qualifier ====
First round
4	(Sweden) Nicklas Kulti	7	6
WC	(Mexico) Alejandro Hernández	5	2
(United States) Michael Joyce	6	6
11	(Uruguay) Marcelo Filippini	1	4

Qualifying competition
4	(Sweden) Nicklas Kulti	7	7
(United States) Michael Joyce	5	6

==== Fifth qualifier ====
First round
5	(United States) Jeff Tarango	6	6	7
WC	(Philippines) Cecil Mamiit	4	7	6
(Ecuador) Nicolás Lapentti	6	6	6
10	(Australia) Scott Draper	7	2	3

Qualifying competition
5	(United States) Jeff Tarango	6	6
(Ecuador) Nicolás Lapentti	3	3

==== Sixth qualifier ====
First round
6	(Austria) Gilbert Schaller	6	6
(France) Jérôme Golmard	4	2
WC	(Sweden) Fredrik Bergh	3	6
8	(Brazil) Gustavo Kuerten	6	7

Qualifying competition
6	(Austria) Gilbert Schaller	1	2
8	(Brazil) Gustavo Kuerten	6	6

==== Seventh qualifier ====
First round
7	(Spain) Juan Albert Viloca	5	3
(Canada) Daniel Nestor	7	6
(Spain) Jordi Burillo	6	6
9	(Brazil) Fernando Meligeni	7	7

Qualifying competition
(Canada) Daniel Nestor	3	6
9	(Brazil) Fernando Meligeni	6	7
