= Alex O'Brien =

American tennis player (born 1970)

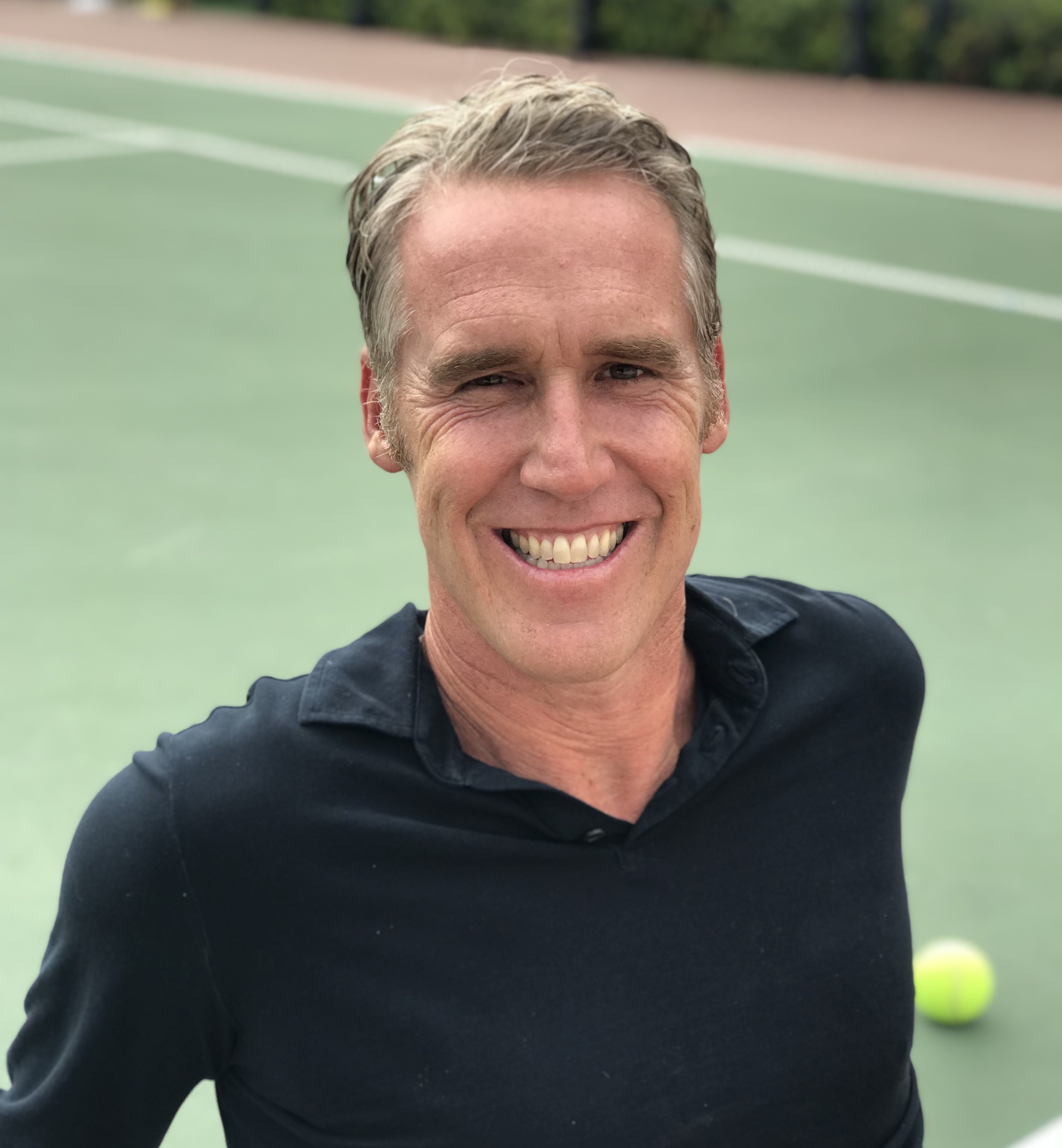
- O'Brien in 2018
- Country (sports): United States
- Born: March 7, 1970 (age 56) Amarillo, Texas, U.S.
- Height: 1.85 m (6 ft 1 in)
- Turned pro: 1992
- Retired: 2003
- Plays: Right-handed (two-handed backhand)
- College: Stanford University
- Prize money: $3,526,390

Singles
- Career record: 93–136
- Career titles: 1
- Highest ranking: No. 30 (21 July 1997)

Grand Slam singles results
- Australian Open: 2R (1995, 1998)
- French Open: 2R (1993, 1994)
- Wimbledon: 3R (1997)
- US Open: 3R (1996)

Doubles
- Career record: 277–185
- Career titles: 13
- Highest ranking: No. 1 (8 May 2000)

Grand Slam doubles results
- Australian Open: F (1996, 1997)
- French Open: 3R (1996)
- Wimbledon: QF (1999, 2000)
- US Open: W (1999)

Other doubles tournaments
- Tour Finals: W (1999)
- Olympic Games: 2R (2000)

Grand Slam mixed doubles results
- Australian Open: 2R (1996)
- Wimbledon: 2R (1997, 1998)
- US Open: 1R (2001)
- Last updated on: 31 December 2022.

Alex O'Brien (born March 7, 1970) is an American former doubles world No. 1 tennis player. He gained the top ranking in May 2000 and was ranked as high as world No. 30 in singles in June 1997. He won the men's doubles at the 1999 US Open with partner Sébastien Lareau.

== Tennis career ==
O'Brien won his only singles title at New Haven, Connecticut in 1996 and reached the quarterfinals of the 1994 Cincinnati Masters and the 1996 Canada Masters.

He won 13 doubles titles, including one Grand Slam tournament, the 1999 US Open, and the season-ending 1999 ATP Doubles Championships, both partnering Sébastien Lareau. The pair were also finalists at the 1996 Australian Open and 1997 Australian Open.

O'Brien played on the United States Davis Cup team, competed in the 2000 Sydney Olympics, and was a four-time All-American at Stanford University, where he won NCAA singles, doubles, and team titles in 1992. He earned a bachelor's degree in American Studies at Stanford in 1992.

== After tennis ==
Following his tennis career, O'Brien founded an online business which markets and distributes steaks. The O'Brien family has been in the beef business for 60 years basing their production out of the LIT Ranch. O'Brien is currently President and part owner of the Bank of Commerce, a small community online bank with branches in Amarillo and McLean Texas.

== Grand Slam finals ==
=== Doubles (1 title, 3 runners-ups) ===
Result	Year	Championship	Surface	Partner	Opponents	Score
Loss	1995	U.S. Open	Hard	(Australia) Sandon Stolle	(Australia) Todd Woodbridge (Australia) Mark Woodforde	3–6, 3–6
Loss	1996	Australian Open	Hard	(Canada) Sébastien Lareau	(Sweden) Stefan Edberg (Czech Republic) Petr Korda	5–7, 5–7, 6–4, 1–6
Loss	1997	Australian Open	Hard	(Canada) Sébastien Lareau	(Australia) Todd Woodbridge (Australia) Mark Woodforde	6–4, 5–7, 5–7, 3–6
Win	1999	U.S. Open	Hard	(Canada) Sébastien Lareau	(India) Mahesh Bhupathi (India) Leander Paes	7–6^{(9–7)}, 6–4

== ATP career finals ==
=== Singles: 1 (1 title) ===
Legend Grand Slam Tournaments (0–0) ATP World Tour Finals (0–0) ATP Masters Series (0–0) ATP Championship Series (1–0) ATP World Series (0–0)	Finals by surface Hard (1–0) Clay (0–0) Grass (0–0) Carpet (0–0)	Finals by setting Outdoors (1–0) Indoors (0–0)

Result	W–L	Date	Tournament	Tier	Surface	Opponent	Score
Win	1–0	Aug 1996	New Haven, United States	Championship Series	Hard	(Netherlands) Jan Siemerink	7–6^{(8–6)}, 6–4

=== Doubles: 33 (13 titles, 20 runner-ups) ===
Legend Grand Slam Tournaments (1–3) ATP World Tour Finals (1–1) ATP Masters Series (4–3) ATP Championship Series (2–4) ATP World Series (5–9)	Finals by surface Hard (10–14) Clay (0–4) Grass (1–1) Carpet (2–1)	Finals by setting Outdoors (8–16) Indoors (5–4)

Result	W–L	Date	Tournament	Tier	Surface	Partner	Opponents	Score
Loss	0–1	Jan 1994	Oahu, United States	World Series	Hard	(United States) Jonathan Stark	(Netherlands) Tom Nijssen (Czech Republic) Cyril Suk	4–6, 4–6
Loss	0–2	Feb 1994	Scottsdale, United States	World Series	Hard	(Australia) Sandon Stolle	(Sweden) Jan Apell (United States) Ken Flach	0–6, 4–6
Win	1–2	Aug 1994	Cincinnati, United States	Masters Series	Hard	(Australia) Sandon Stolle	(South Africa) Wayne Ferreira (Australia) Mark Kratzmann	6–7, 6–3, 6–2
Loss	1–3	Feb 1995	San Jose, United States	World Series	Hard	(Australia) Sandon Stolle	(United States) Jim Grabb (United States) Patrick McEnroe	6–3, 5–7, 0–6
Loss	1–4	May 1995	Pinehurst, United States	World Series	Clay	(Australia) Sandon Stolle	(Australia) Todd Woodbridge (Australia) Mark Woodforde	2–6, 4–6
Loss	1–5	Sep 1995	New York, United States	Grand Slam	Hard	(Australia) Sandon Stolle	(Australia) Todd Woodbridge (Australia) Mark Woodforde	3–6, 3–6
Loss	1–6	Jan 1996	Melbourne, Australia	Grand Slam	Hard	(Canada) Sébastien Lareau	(Sweden) Stefan Edberg (Czech Republic) Petr Korda	5–7, 5–7, 6–4, 1–6
Loss	1–7	Jun 1996	Queen's, United Kingdom	World Series	Grass	(Canada) Sébastien Lareau	(Australia) Todd Woodbridge (Australia) Mark Woodforde	3–6, 6–7^{(3–7)}
Win	2–7	Oct 1996	Stuttgart, Germany	Masters Series	Hard	(Canada) Sébastien Lareau	(Netherlands) Jacco Eltingh (Netherlands) Paul Haarhuis	3–6, 6–4, 6–3
Loss	2–8	Nov 1996	Hartford, United States	ATP Finals	Carpet	(Canada) Sébastien Lareau	(Australia) Todd Woodbridge (Australia) Mark Woodforde	4–6, 7–5, 2–6, 6–7^{(3–7)}
Loss	2–9	Jan 1997	Melbourne, Australia	Grand Slam	Hard	(Canada) Sébastien Lareau	(Australia) Todd Woodbridge (Australia) Mark Woodforde	6–4, 5–7, 5–7, 3–6
Win	3–9	Mar 1997	Philadelphia, United States	Championship Series	Hard	(Canada) Sébastien Lareau	(South Africa) Ellis Ferreira (United States) Patrick Galbraith	6–3, 6–3
Loss	3–10	Apr 1997	Orlando, United States	World Series	Clay	(United States) Jeff Salzenstein	(The Bahamas) Mark Merklein (United States) Vince Spadea	4–6, 6–4, 4–6
Loss	3–11	May 1997	Rome, Italy	Masters Series	Clay	(Zimbabwe) Byron Black	(The Bahamas) Mark Knowles (Canada) Daniel Nestor	3–6, 6–4, 5–7
Win	4–11	Jul 1997	Los Angeles, United States	World Series	Hard	(Canada) Sébastien Lareau	(India) Mahesh Bhupathi (United States) Rick Leach	7–6, 6–4
Loss	4–12	Aug 1997	Montreal, Canada	Masters Series	Hard	(Canada) Sébastien Lareau	(India) Mahesh Bhupathi (India) Leander Paes	6–7, 3–6
Loss	4–13	Aug 1997	New Haven, United States	Championship Series	Hard	(Canada) Sébastien Lareau	(India) Mahesh Bhupathi (India) Leander Paes	4–6, 7–6, 2–6
Loss	4–14	Oct 1997	Beijing, China	World Series	Hard	(United States) Jim Courier	(India) Mahesh Bhupathi (India) Leander Paes	5–7, 6–7
Loss	4–15	Mar 1998	Miami, United States	Masters Series	Hard	(United States) Jonathan Stark	(South Africa) Ellis Ferreira (United States) Rick Leach	2–6, 4–6
Win	5–15	Apr 1998	Hong Kong, Hong Kong	International Series	Hard	(Zimbabwe) Byron Black	(South Africa) Neville Godwin (Finland) Tuomas Ketola	7–5, 6–1
Loss	5–16	May 1998	Atlanta, United States	World Series	Clay	(United States) Richey Reneberg	(South Africa) Ellis Ferreira (South Africa) Brent Haygarth	3–6, 6–0, 2–6
Loss	5–17	Aug 1998	New Haven, United States	Championship Series	Hard	(Canada) Sébastien Lareau	(Australia) Wayne Arthurs (Australia) Peter Tramacchi	6–7, 6–1, 3–6
Win	6–17	Nov 1998	Stuttgart, Germany	Masters Series	Hard	(Canada) Sébastien Lareau	(India) Mahesh Bhupathi (India) Leander Paes	6–3, 3–6, 7–5
Win	7–17	Jan 1999	Doha, Qatar	World Series	Hard	(United States) Jared Palmer	(South Africa) Piet Norval (Zimbabwe) Kevin Ullyett	6–3, 6–4
Loss	7–18	Feb 1999	Memphis, United States	Championship Series	Hard	(Canada) Sébastien Lareau	(Australia) Todd Woodbridge (Australia) Mark Woodforde	3–6, 4–6
Win	8–18	Jun 1999	Queen's, United Kingdom	World Series	Grass	(Canada) Sébastien Lareau	(Australia) Todd Woodbridge (Australia) Mark Woodforde	6–3, 7–6^{(7–3)}
Win	9–18	Sep 1999	New York, United States	Grand Slam	Hard	(Canada) Sébastien Lareau	(India) Mahesh Bhupathi (India) Leander Paes	7–6^{(9–7)}, 6–4
Win	10–18	Nov 1999	Paris, France	Masters Series	Carpet	(Canada) Sébastien Lareau	(Netherlands) Paul Haarhuis (United States) Jared Palmer	7–6^{(9–7)}, 7–5
Win	11–18	Nov 1999	Hartford, United States	ATP Finals	Carpet	(Canada) Sébastien Lareau	(India) Mahesh Bhupathi (India) Leander Paes	6–3, 6–2, 6–2
Loss	11–19	Jan 2000	Doha, Qatar	International Series	Hard	(United States) Jared Palmer	(The Bahamas) Mark Knowles (Belarus) Max Mirnyi	3–6, 4–6
Win	12–19	Mar 2000	Indian Wells, United States	Masters Series	Hard	(United States) Jared Palmer	(Netherlands) Paul Haarhuis (Australia) Sandon Stolle	6–4, 7–6^{(7–5)}
Win	13–19	Aug 2000	Washington, United States	Championship Series	Hard	(United States) Jared Palmer	(United States) Andre Agassi (Armenia) Sargis Sargsian	7–5, 6–1
Loss	13–20	Feb 2001	Memphis, United States	Championship Series	Hard	(United States) Jonathan Stark	(United States) Bob Bryan (United States) Mike Bryan	3–6, 6–7^{(3–7)}

== ATP Challenger and ITF Futures finals ==
=== Singles: 9 (5–4) ===
Legend ATP Challenger (5–4) ITF Futures (0–0)	Finals by surface Hard (5–4) Clay (0–0) Grass (0–0) Carpet (0–0)

Result	W–L	Date	Tournament	Tier	Surface	Opponent	Score
Win	1–0	Jul 1991	New Haven, United States	Challenger	Hard	(France) Stephane Simian	6–4, 6–4
Win	2–0	Jul 1992	Aptos, United States	Challenger	Hard	(Zimbabwe) Byron Black	6–4, 2–6, 6–1
Loss	2–1	Sep 1992	Fairfield, United States	Challenger	Hard	(United States) Jared Palmer	6–7, 2–6
Win	3–1	Oct 1992	Monterrey, Mexico	Challenger	Hard	(United States) Jared Palmer	6–2, 6–4
Loss	3–2	Oct 1993	Caracas, Venezuela	Challenger	Hard	(Colombia) Mauricio Hadad	5–7, 4–6
Loss	3–3	Oct 1996	Monterrey, Mexico	Challenger	Hard	(Zimbabwe) Kevin Ullyett	3–6, 6–7
Win	4–3	Feb 1998	West Bloomfield, United States	Challenger	Hard	(Australia) Grant Doyle	4–6, 6–3, 6–4
Win	5–3	Jul 1999	Winnetka, United States	Challenger	Hard	(Belarus) Max Mirnyi	6–2, 6–2
Loss	5–4	Dec 1999	Burbank, United States	Challenger	Hard	(Philippines) Cecil Mamiit	5–7, 3–6

=== Doubles: 7 (5–2) ===
Legend ATP Challenger (5–2) ITF Futures (0–0)	Finals by surface Hard (5–1) Clay (0–1) Grass (0–0) Carpet (0–0)

Result	W–L	Date	Tournament	Tier	Surface	Partner	Opponents	Score
Win	1–0	Jul 1992	Aptos, United States	Challenger	Hard	(United States) Paul Annacone	(Puerto Rico) Miguel Nido (Sweden) Peter Nyborg	6–4, 4–6, 7–5
Win	2–0	Oct 1992	Monterrey, Mexico	Challenger	Hard	(The Bahamas) Mark Knowles	(United States) Richard Matuszewski (United States) John Sullivan	3–6, 6–3, 7–6
Loss	2–1	Dec 1992	Naples, United States	Challenger	Clay	(The Bahamas) Mark Knowles	(United States) Todd Nelson (Sweden) Tobias Svantesson	6–2, 3–6, 4–6
Win	3–1	Sep 1993	Fairfield, United States	Challenger	Hard	(United States) Jared Palmer	(United States) Matt Lucena (United States) Brian Macphie	6–3, 7–5
Loss	3–2	Oct 1993	Caracas, Venezuela	Challenger	Hard	(The Bahamas) Mark Knowles	(Venezuela) Maurice Ruah (Italy) Laurence Tieleman	7–5, 4–6, 6–7
Win	4–2	Jun 1994	Annenheim, Austria	Challenger	Hard	(United States) Jim Grabb	(Italy) Diego Nargiso (Italy) Gianluca Pozzi	walkover
Win	5–2	Jul 1994	Aptos, United States	Challenger	Hard	(United States) Brian Macphie	(United States) Donny Isaak (United States) Michael Roberts	6–2, 7–6

== Performance Timelines ==
Key
W	F	SF	QF	#R	RR	Q#	DNQ	A	NH

(W) winner; (F) finalist; (SF) semifinalist; (QF) quarterfinalist; (#R) rounds 4, 3, 2, 1; (RR) round-robin stage; (Q#) qualification round; (DNQ) did not qualify; (A) absent; (NH) not held; (SR) strike rate (events won / competed); (W–L) win–loss record.

=== Singles ===
Tournament	1992	1993	1994	1995	1996	1997	1998	1999	2000	2001	SR	W–L	Win %
Grand Slam tournaments
Australian Open	A	1R	1R	2R	A	1R	2R	Q2	1R	1R	0 / 7	2–7	22%
French Open	A	2R	2R	Q1	Q2	1R	1R	Q1	A	Q2	0 / 4	2–4	33%
Wimbledon	A	1R	1R	1R	Q3	3R	2R	Q3	2R	Q3	0 / 6	4–6	40%
US Open	1R	1R	2R	1R	3R	1R	2R	Q1	Q3	A	0 / 7	4–7	36%
Win–loss	0–1	1–4	2–4	1–3	2–1	2–4	3–4	0–0	1–2	0–1	0 / 24	12–24	33%
ATP Masters Series
Indian Wells	A	1R	A	Q1	1R	2R	Q2	A	Q1	A	0 / 3	1–3	25%
Miami	A	1R	2R	2R	Q3	2R	Q1	2R	Q1	A	0 / 5	3–5	38%
Rome	A	A	A	A	A	1R	A	A	Q1	A	0 / 1	0–1	0%
Canada	A	2R	2R	Q3	QF	3R	3R	2R	A	A	0 / 6	10–6	63%
Cincinnati	A	1R	QF	2R	3R	1R	1R	Q2	Q1	Q1	0 / 6	5–6	45%
Paris	A	A	Q1	Q3	A	A	A	A	1R	A	0 / 1	0–1	0%
Win–loss	0–0	1–4	4–3	2–2	5–3	3–5	2–2	2–2	0–1	0–0	0 / 22	19–22	46%

=== Doubles ===
Tournament	1992	1993	1994	1995	1996	1997	1998	1999	2000	2001	SR	W–L	Win %
Grand Slam tournaments
Australian Open	A	A	1R	1R	F	F	3R	1R	SF	3R	0 / 8	18–8	69%
French Open	A	A	1R	2R	3R	2R	1R	1R	1R	1R	0 / 8	4–8	33%
Wimbledon	A	A	2R	3R	3R	1R	2R	QF	QF	1R	0 / 8	12–8	60%
US Open	1R	1R	3R	F	QF	2R	3R	W	SF	1R	1 / 10	23–9	72%
Win–loss	0–1	0–1	3–4	8–4	12–4	7–4	5–4	9–3	11–4	2–4	1 / 34	57–33	63%
Year-end Championships
ATP Finals	Did not qualify				F	SF	DNQ	W	RR	DNQ	1 / 4	10–7	59%
National Representation
Summer Olympics	A	Not Held			A	Not Held			2R	NH	0 / 1	0–1	0%
ATP Masters Series
Indian Wells	A	Q1	A	2R	2R	QF	SF	1R	W	2R	1 / 7	13–6	68%
Miami	A	Q1	2R	3R	QF	3R	F	2R	SF	2R	0 / 8	12–8	60%
Monte Carlo	A	A	A	A	A	A	A	A	SF	A	0 / 1	3–1	75%
Hamburg	A	A	A	A	A	A	A	A	1R	1R	0 / 2	0–2	0%
Rome	A	A	A	A	2R	F	A	2R	SF	1R	0 / 5	8–5	62%
Canada	A	QF	SF	1R	QF	F	1R	2R	2R	2R	0 / 9	13–9	59%
Cincinnati	A	2R	W	2R	2R	SF	1R	2R	1R	2R	1 / 9	12–8	60%
Paris	A	A	QF	1R	2R	1R	2R	W	SF	A	1 / 7	8–6	57%
Win–loss	0–0	3–2	10–3	3–5	7–6	12–6	8–5	7–5	16–7	3–6	3 / 48	69–45	61%
Year End Ranking	188	113	25	31	15	7	20	7	8	80	Prize Money = $3,526,390		
