= 1997 Newsweek Champions Cup – Doubles =

Doubles
- 1997 Newsweek Champions Cup

Final
- Champions: (The Bahamas) Mark Knowles (Canada) Daniel Nestor
- Runners-up: (Australia) Mark Philippoussis (Australia) Patrick Rafter
- Score: 7–6, 4–6, 7–5

Events
Singles	Doubles
← 1996 ·	Newsweek Champions Cup	· 1998 →

Todd Woodbridge and Mark Woodforde were the defending champions but lost in the semifinals to Mark Philippoussis and Patrick Rafter.

Mark Knowles and Daniel Nestor won in the final 7–6, 4–6, 7–5 against Philippoussis and Rafter.

== Seeds ==
The top four seeded teams received byes into the second round.

1. (Australia) Todd Woodbridge / (Australia) Mark Woodforde (final)
2. (Netherlands) Jacco Eltingh / (Netherlands) Paul Haarhuis (second round)
3. (Zimbabwe) Byron Black / (Canada) Grant Connell (second round)
4. (South Africa) Ellis Ferreira / (United States) Patrick Galbraith (second round)
5. (Canada) Sébastien Lareau / (United States) Alex O'Brien (quarterfinals)
6. (The Bahamas) Mark Knowles / (Canada) Daniel Nestor (champions)
7. (Sweden) Jonas Björkman / (Sweden) Nicklas Kulti (quarterfinals)
8. (United States) Rick Leach / (United States) Jonathan Stark (quarterfinals)

== Draw ==
=== Key ===
- Q = Qualifier
- WC = Wild card
- LL = Lucky loser
- Alt = Alternate
- SE = Special exempt
- PR = Protected ranking
- ITF = ITF entry
- JE = Junior exempt
- w/o = Walkover
- r = Retired
- d = Defaulted
- SR = Special ranking

=== Final ===
Semifinals

Final

1
- (Australia) Todd Woodbridge
- (Australia) Mark Woodforde
4
6
6

- (Australia) Mark Philippoussis
- (Australia) Patrick Rafter
6
4
7

- (Australia) Mark Philippoussis
- (Australia) Patrick Rafter
6
6
5

6
- (The Bahamas) Mark Knowles
- (Canada) Daniel Nestor
7
4
7

6
- (The Bahamas) Mark Knowles
- (Canada) Daniel Nestor
6
3
6

Q
- (United States) Scott Davis
- (United States) Kelly Jones
4
6
3

=== Top half ===
First round

Second round

Quarterfinals

Semifinals

1
- (Australia) T Woodbridge
- (Australia) M Woodforde
6
6
6

- (United Kingdom) N Broad
- (South Africa) P Norval
4
6
7

- (United Kingdom) N Broad
- (South Africa) P Norval
3
7
4

- (France) G Forget
- (Switzerland) M Rosset
6
3
5

1
- (Australia) T Woodbridge
- (Australia) M Woodforde
6
7

WC
- (United States) L Jensen
- (United States) M Jensen
7
6

8
- (United States) R Leach
- (United States) J Stark
3
5

WC
- (United States) J Courier
- (United States) C Woodruff
6
4

WC
- (United States) L Jensen
- (United States) M Jensen
6
1

- (Australia) S Stolle
- (Czech Republic) C Suk
6
3
4

8
- (United States) R Leach
- (United States) J Stark
7
6

8
- (United States) R Leach
- (United States) J Stark
3
6
6

1
- (Australia) T Woodbridge
- (Australia) M Woodforde
4
6
6

- (Australia) M Philippoussis
- (Australia) P Rafter
6
4
7

3
- (Zimbabwe) B Black
- (Canada) G Connell
6
4

- (Czech Republic) J Novák
- (Czech Republic) P Vízner
2
3

- (Australia) M Philippoussis
- (Australia) P Rafter
7
6

- (Australia) M Philippoussis
- (Australia) P Rafter
6
6

- (Australia) M Philippoussis
- (Australia) P Rafter
7
6

- (United States) B MacPhie
- (Australia) M Tebbutt
4
4

5
- (Canada) S Lareau
- (United States) A O'Brien
6
6

- (United States) J Grabb
- (United States) R Reneberg
6
6

- (United States) J Grabb
- (United States) R Reneberg
3
6

- (United States) T Ho
- (United States) J Waite
1
5

5
- (Canada) S Lareau
- (United States) A O'Brien
6
7

5
- (Canada) S Lareau
- (United States) A O'Brien
6
7

=== Bottom half ===
First round

Second round

Quarterfinals

Semifinals

6
- (The Bahamas) M Knowles
- (Canada) D Nestor
4
7
6

- (United States) D Johnson
- (United States) F Montana
6
5
3

6
- (The Bahamas) M Knowles
- (Canada) D Nestor
7
6

- (Netherlands) H J Davids
- (Netherlands) S Schalken
6
6
6

WC
- (South Africa) W Ferreira
- (South Africa) G Muller
5
3

WC
- (South Africa) W Ferreira
- (South Africa) G Muller
4
7
7

6
- (The Bahamas) M Knowles
- (Canada) D Nestor
7
6

- (Australia) J Eagle
- (Australia) A Florent
3
2

- (Germany) M-K Goellner
- (South Africa) B Talbot
5
4

- (Germany) M-K Goellner
- (South Africa) B Talbot
6
6

- (Germany) M-K Goellner
- (South Africa) B Talbot
4
6
6

4
- (South Africa) E Ferreira
- (United States) P Galbraith
6
3
4

6
- (The Bahamas) M Knowles
- (Canada) D Nestor
6
3
6

7
- (Sweden) J Björkman
- (Sweden) N Kulti
6
6

Q
- (United States) S Davis
- (United States) K Jones
4
6
3

Q
- (South Africa) M Ondruska
- (India) L Paes
2
4

7
- (Sweden) J Björkman
- (Sweden) N Kulti
6
6

- (United States) T Kronemann
- (Australia) D Macpherson
4
4

- (Argentina) L Lobo
- (Spain) J Sánchez
3
3

- (Argentina) L Lobo
- (Spain) J Sánchez
6
6

7
- (Sweden) J Björkman
- (Sweden) N Kulti
6
4

- (United States) J Tarango
- (South Africa) C van Rensburg
6
4

Q
- (United States) S Davis
- (United States) K Jones
7
6

Q
- (United States) S Davis
- (United States) K Jones
7
6

Q
- (United States) S Davis
- (United States) K Jones
7
6

2
- (Netherlands) J Eltingh
- (Netherlands) P Haarhuis
6
4
