= 1995 Newsweek Champions Cup and the State Farm Evert Cup =

1995 Newsweek Champions Cup and State Farm Evert Cup
- Date: March 6–13 (men); February 27 - March 5 (women)
- Edition: 22nd
- Category: Championship Series, Single Week (men); Tier II (women)
- Prize money: $1,550,000 (men) $430,000 (women)
- Surface: Hard / outdoor
- Location: Indian Wells, California, U.S.

Champions

Men's singles
- (United States) Pete Sampras

Women's singles
- (United States) Mary Joe Fernández

Men's doubles
- (United States) Tommy Ho / (Australia) Brett Steven

Women's doubles
- (United States) Lindsay Davenport / (United States) Lisa Raymond
← 1994 ·	Newsweek Champions Cup	· 1996 →
← 1994 ·	State Farm Evert Cup	· 1996 →

The 1995 Newsweek Champions Cup and the State Farm Evert Cup were tennis tournaments played on outdoor hard courts. It was the 22nd edition of the Indian Wells Masters and was part of the Championship Series, Single Week of the 1995 ATP Tour and of Tier II of the 1995 WTA Tour. They were held at the Grand Champions Resort in Indian Wells, California, in the United States, with the men's tournament played from March 6 through March 13, 1995, while the women's tournament took place from February 27 through March 5, 1995.

== Finals ==
=== Men's singles ===
(United States) Pete Sampras defeated (United States) Andre Agassi 7–5, 6–3, 7–5

- It was Sampras' 1st title of the year and the 33rd of his career.

=== Women's singles ===
(United States) Mary Joe Fernández defeated (Belarus) Natasha Zvereva 6–4, 6–3

- It was Fernández's 1st title of the year and the 14th of her career.

=== Men's doubles ===
(United States) Tommy Ho / (New Zealand) Brett Steven defeated (South Africa) Gary Muller / (South Africa) Piet Norval 6–4, 7–6

- It was Ho's 1st title of the year and the 2nd of his career. It was Steven's only title of the year and the 5th of his career.

=== Women's doubles ===
(United States) Lindsay Davenport / (United States) Lisa Raymond defeated (Latvia) Larisa Neiland / (Spain) Arantxa Sánchez Vicario 2–6, 6–4, 6–3

- It was Davenport's 2nd title of the year and the 7th of her career. It was Raymond's only title of the year and the 3rd of her career.

== See also ==
- Agassi–Sampras rivalry
