= 1996 State Farm Evert Cup – Doubles =

Doubles
- 1996 State Farm Evert Cup

Final
- Champions: (United States) Chanda Rubin (Netherlands) Brenda Schultz-McCarthy
- Runners-up: (France) Julie Halard-Decugis (France) Nathalie Tauziat
- Score: 6–1, 6–4

Details
- Draw: 28
- Seeds: 8

Events
Singles	Doubles
← 1995 ·	State Farm Evert Cup	· 1997 →

Lindsay Davenport and Lisa Raymond were the defending champions but they competed with different partners that year, Davenport with Mary Joe Fernández and Raymond with Rennae Stubbs.

Davenport and Fernandez lost in the quarterfinals to Elizabeth Smylie and Linda Wild.

Raymond and Stubbs lost in the semifinals to Julie Halard-Decugis and Nathalie Tauziat.

Chanda Rubin and Brenda Schultz-McCarthy won in the final 6–1, 6–4 against Halard-Decugis and Tauziat.

== Seeds ==
Champion seeds are indicated in bold text while text in italics indicates the round in which those seeds were eliminated. The top four seeded teams received byes into the second round.

1. (United States) Lindsay Davenport / (United States) Mary Joe Fernández (quarterfinals)
2. (United States) Lori McNeil / (Latvia) Larisa Neiland (quarterfinals)
3. (United States) **Chanda Rubin** / (Netherlands) **Brenda Schultz-McCarthy (champions)**
4. (United States) Lisa Raymond / (Australia) Rennae Stubbs (semifinals)
5. (Spain) Conchita Martínez / (Argentina) Patricia Tarabini (second round)
6. (France) Julie Halard-Decugis / (France) Nathalie Tauziat (final)
7. (United States) Katrina Adams / (South Africa) Mariaan de Swardt (first round)
8. (South Africa) Amanda Coetzer / (Argentina) Inés Gorrochategui (quarterfinals)

== Draw ==
=== Key ===
- Q = Qualifier
- WC = Wild card
- LL = Lucky loser
- Alt = Alternate
- ITF = ITF entry
- PR = Protected ranking
- SR = Special ranking
- SE = Special exempt
- JE = Junior exempt
- JR = Junior Accelerator Programme entrant
- CO = College Accelerator Programme entrant
- NG = Next Gen Accelerator Program entrant
- w/o = Walkover
- r = Retired
- d = Defaulted

=== Final ===
Final
3	(United States) **Chanda Rubin** (Netherlands) **Brenda Schultz-McCarthy**	**6**	**6**
6	(France) Julie Halard-Decugis (France) Nathalie Tauziat	1	4

=== Top half ===
First round
(Germany) **A Huber** (Germany) **C Singer**	**6**	2	**7^{8}**
(Romania) R Dragomir (Argentina) M Paz	3	**6**	6^{6}
(Romania) C Cristea (Australia) L Pleming	0	2
(France) **A Dechaume-Balleret** (France) **S Testud**	**6**	**6**
(Australia) **E Smylie** (United States) **L Wild**	**6**	**7**
7	(United States) K Adams (South Africa) M de Swardt	4	5
(Belgium) **N Feber** (Japan) **A Sugiyama**	**6**	**6**
(Australia) R McQuillan (United States) S Stafford	2	2
Q	(Australia) A Ellwood (South Africa) R Nideffer	3	**6**	2
(United States) **M Werdel-Witmeyer** (United States) **T Whitlinger-Jones**	**6**	3	**6**
(Slovakia) J Husárová (Japan) N Kijimuta	1	3
5	(Spain) **C Martínez** (Argentina) **P Tarabini**	**6**	**6**

Second round
1	(United States) **L Davenport** (United States) **M J Fernández**	**6**	4	**7**
(Germany) A Huber (Germany) C Singer	2	**6**	5
(France) A Dechaume-Balleret (France) S Testud	1	3
(Australia) **E Smylie** (United States) **L Wild**	**6**	**6**
3	(United States) **C Rubin** (Netherlands) **B Schultz-McCarthy**	**7^{8}**	**6**
(Belgium) N Feber (Japan) A Sugiyama	6^{6}	2
(United States) **M Werdel-Witmeyer** (United States) **T Whitlinger-Jones**	4	**6**	**7**
5	(Spain) C Martínez (Argentina) P Tarabini	**6**	4	5

Quarterfinals
1	(United States) L Davenport (United States) M J Fernández	**7^{7}**	1	6^{9}
(Australia) **E Smylie** (United States) **L Wild**	6^{5}	**6**	**7^{11}**
3	(United States) **C Rubin** (Netherlands) **B Schultz-McCarthy**	**6**	**6**
(United States) M Werdel-Witmeyer (United States) T Whitlinger-Jones	2	3

Semifinals
(Australia) E Smylie (United States) L Wild	1	5
3	(United States) **C Rubin** (Netherlands) **B Schultz-McCarthy**	**6**	**7**

=== Bottom half ===
First round
8	(South Africa) **A Coetzer** (Argentina) **I Gorrochategui**	**6**	**6**
(Croatia) M Murić (United States) S Reece	3	3
(Russia) E Likhovtseva (United States) D Scott	**6**	2	2
(Canada) **J Hetherington** (Romania) **I Spîrlea**	4	**6**	**6**
WC	(United States) **J Lee** (United States) **L Lee**	3	**6**	**6**
(Australia) N Bradtke (Italy) S Farina	**6**	4	3
6	(France) **J Halard-Decugis** (France) **N Tauziat**	6^{5}	**6**	**6**
(United States) A Frazier (United States) K Po	**7^{7}**	1	1
(United States) **Z Garrison-Jackson** (United States) **K Rinaldi-Stunkel**	**6**	**6**
WC	(United States) T Singian (United States) A Stevenson	0	1
(United States) **D Graham** (Netherlands) **C Vis**	3	**6**	**6**
(United States) G Helgeson-Nielsen (Slovakia) R Zrubáková	**6**	2	4

Second round
8	(South Africa) **A Coetzer** (Argentina) **I Gorrochategui**	**6**	**7**
(Canada) J Hetherington (Romania) I Spîrlea	4	5
WC	(United States) J Lee (United States) L Lee	**6**	1	3
4	(United States) **L Raymond** (Australia) **R Stubbs**	4	**6**	**6**
6	(France) **J Halard-Decugis** (France) **N Tauziat**	**6**	**7^{7}**
(United States) Z Garrison-Jackson (United States) K Rinaldi-Stunkel	1	6^{3}
(United States) D Graham (Netherlands) C Vis	2	**7^{7}**	5
2	(United States) **L McNeil** (Latvia) **L Neiland**	**6**	6^{4}	**7**

Quarterfinals
8	(South Africa) A Coetzer (Argentina) I Gorrochategui	2	**7^{7}**	3
4	(United States) **L Raymond** (Australia) **R Stubbs**	**6**	6^{4}	**6**
6	(France) **J Halard-Decugis** (France) **N Tauziat**	**7^{10}**	**6**
2	(United States) L McNeil (Latvia) L Neiland	6^{8}	4

Semifinals
4	(United States) L Raymond (Australia) R Stubbs	3	4
6	(France) **J Halard-Decugis** (France) **N Tauziat**	**6**	**6**
