= 1996 Newsweek Champions Cup – Singles =

Singles
- 1996 Newsweek Champions Cup

Final
- Champion: (United States) Michael Chang
- Runner-up: (Netherlands) Paul Haarhuis
- Score: 7–5, 6–1, 6–1

Details
- Draw: 56
- Seeds: 16

Events
| Singles | Doubles |
| ← 1995 · | Newsweek Champions Cup | · 1997 → |

Michael Chang defeated Paul Haarhuis in the final, 7–5, 6–1, 6–1 to win the men's singles tennis title at the 1996 Indian Wells Masters.

Pete Sampras was the two-time defending champion, but lost in the quarterfinals to Haarhuis.

== Seeds ==
The top eight seeds received a bye to the second round.

1. (United States) Pete Sampras (quarterfinals)
2. (Austria) Thomas Muster (second round)
3. (United States) Andre Agassi (quarterfinals)
4. (Germany) Boris Becker (second round)
5. (United States) Michael Chang (champion)
6. (Croatia) Goran Ivanišević (semifinals)
7. (United States) Jim Courier (third round)
8. (Sweden) Thomas Enqvist (second round)
9. (South Africa) Wayne Ferreira (quarterfinals)
10. (Switzerland) Marc Rosset (first round)
11. (Ukraine) Andriy Medvedev (first round)
12. (France) Arnaud Boetsch (third round)
13. (Spain) Albert Costa (third round)
14. (United States) Todd Martin (third round)
15. (United States) MaliVai Washington (first round)
16. (Austria) Gilbert Schaller (first round)

== Draw ==
=== Key ===
- Q = Qualifier
- WC = Wild card
- LL = Lucky loser
- Alt = Alternate
- SE = Special exempt
- PR = Protected ranking
- ITF = ITF entry
- JE = Junior exempt
- w/o = Walkover
- r = Retired
- d = Defaulted
- SR = Special ranking

=== Finals ===
Quarterfinals
1 | (United States) Pete Sampras | 5 | 7^{7} | 1
(Netherlands) Paul Haarhuis | 7 | 6^{5} | 6
(Spain) Carlos Costa | 4 | 4
6 | (Croatia) Goran Ivanišević | 6 | 6
5 | (United States) Michael Chang | 6^{3} | 6 | 6
3 | (United States) Andre Agassi | 7^{7} | 2 | 1
9 | (South Africa) Wayne Ferreira | 5 | 5
(Chile) Marcelo Ríos | 7 | 7

Semifinals
(Netherlands) Paul Haarhuis | 6 | 7^{7}
6 | (Croatia) Goran Ivanišević | 2 | 6^{6}
5 | (United States) Michael Chang | 7^{8} | 6
(Chile) Marcelo Ríos | 6^{6} | 3

Final
(Netherlands) Paul Haarhuis | 5 | 1 | 1
5 | (United States) Michael Chang | 7 | 6 | 6

=== Top half ===
==== Section 1 ====
First round
(Czech Republic) P Korda | 6 | 5 | 4
(Spain) À Corretja | 3 | 7 | 6
(Sweden) J Björkman | 6 | 6
WC | (France) G Forget | 3 | 4
Q | (United States) M Joyce | 6 | 6
16 | (Austria) G Schaller | 3 | 4
10 | (Switzerland) M Rosset | 6 | 1 | 2
(Italy) R Furlan | 2 | 6 | 6
(Italy) A Gaudenzi | 6 | 6
Q | (South Africa) G Stafford | 3 | 3
Q | (Italy) D Nargiso | 7^{7} | 2 | 5
(Netherlands) P Haarhuis | 6^{5} | 6 | 7

Second round
1 | (United States) P Sampras | w/o
(Spain) À Corretja
(Sweden) J Björkman | 3 | 4
Q | (United States) M Joyce | 6 | 6
(Italy) R Furlan | 7^{7} | 3 | 6
(Italy) A Gaudenzi | 6^{5} | 6 | 2
(Netherlands) P Haarhuis | 6 | 6
8 | (Sweden) T Enqvist | 4 | 2

Third round
1 | (United States) P Sampras | 6 | 6
Q | (United States) M Joyce | 3 | 4
(Italy) R Furlan | 3 | 4
(Netherlands) P Haarhuis | 6 | 6

Quarterfinals
1 | (United States) P Sampras | 5 | 7^{7} | 1
(Netherlands) P Haarhuis | 7 | 6^{5} | 6

==== Section 2 ====
First round
Q | (United States) A O'Brien | 6^{5} | 6 | 5
(Spain) C Costa | 7^{7} | 1 | 7
(Sweden) M Larsson | 2 | 4
(Switzerland) J Hlasek | 6 | 6
WC | (United States) C Mamiit | 2 | 4
13 | (Spain) A Costa | 6 | 6
11 | (Ukraine) A Medvedev | 3 | 6 | 5
(Spain) J Burillo | 6 | 4 | 7
(United Kingdom) G Rusedski | 6 | 4 | 4
(Germany) B Karbacher | 3 | 6 | 6
(Argentina) J Frana | 6^{5} | 2
(Zimbabwe) B Black | 7^{7} | 6

Second round
4/WC | (Germany) B Becker | 3 | 5
(Spain) C Costa | 6 | 7
(Switzerland) J Hlasek | 5 | 2
13 | (Spain) A Costa | 7 | 6
(Spain) J Burillo | 1 | 6 | 7
(Germany) B Karbacher | 6 | 1 | 5
(Zimbabwe) B Black | 1 | 3
6 | (Croatia) G Ivanišević | 6 | 6

Third round
(Spain) C Costa | 6 | 4 | 6
13 | (Spain) A Costa | 3 | 6 | 4
(Spain) J Burillo | 4 | 5
6 | (Croatia) G Ivanišević | 6 | 7

Quarterfinals
(Spain) C Costa | 4 | 4
6 | (Croatia) G Ivanišević | 6 | 6

=== Bottom half ===
==== Section 3 ====
First round
(Sweden) S Edberg | 6 | 6
(Czech Republic) J Novák | 1 | 2
Q | (Canada) D Nestor | 7^{7} | 6
(New Zealand) B Steven | 6^{2} | 4
(Morocco) Y El Aynaoui | 3 | 1^{r}
12 | (France) A Boetsch | 6 | 4
14 | (United States) T Martin | 6 | 6
WC | (Australia) J Stoltenberg | 3 | 2
(Spain) J Sánchez | 7^{8} | 2 | 2
(Australia) M Woodforde | 6^{6} | 6 | 6
(Netherlands) S Schalken | 7^{7} | 6
Q | (Ecuador) N Lapentti | 6^{4} | 3

Second round
5 | (United States) M Chang | 4 | 6 | 6
(Sweden) S Edberg | 6 | 3 | 1
Q | (Canada) D Nestor | 4 | 3
12 | (France) A Boetsch | 6 | 6
14 | (United States) T Martin | 6 | 6
(Australia) M Woodforde | 4 | 3
(Netherlands) S Schalken | 1 | 6 | 3
3 | (United States) A Agassi | 6 | 4 | 6

Third round
5 | (United States) M Chang | 6 | 6
12 | (France) A Boetsch | 1 | 3
14 | (United States) T Martin | 6^{9} | 6 | 6^{1}
3 | (United States) A Agassi | 7^{11} | 2 | 7^{7}

Quarterfinals
5 | (United States) M Chang | 6^{3} | 6 | 6
3 | (United States) A Agassi | 7^{7} | 2 | 1

==== Section 4 ====
First round
(Australia) T Woodbridge | 7 | 6
(Spain) A Berasategui | 5 | 1
(Spain) F Clavet | 3 | 0
(Australia) M Philippoussis | 6 | 6
(Argentina) H Gumy | 7^{7} | 5 | 3
9 | (South Africa) W Ferreira | 6^{1} | 7 | 6
15 | (United States) M Washington | 3 | 5
Q | (United States) J Stark | 6 | 7
(Chile) M Ríos | 7^{7} | 6
WC | (The Bahamas) M Knowles | 6^{4} | 3
(Sweden) M Wilander | 3 | 6^{9}
(Romania) A Voinea | 6 | 7^{11}

Second round
7 | (United States) J Courier | 6 | 6
(Australia) T Woodbridge | 3 | 3
(Australia) M Philippoussis | 6 | 6^{4} | 6^{5}
9 | (South Africa) W Ferreira | 2 | 7^{7} | 7^{7}
Q | (United States) J Stark | 6^{3} | 1
(Chile) M Ríos | 7^{7} | 6
(Romania) A Voinea | 6 | 7
2 | (Austria) T Muster | 3 | 5

Third round
7 | (United States) J Courier | 4 | 4
9 | (South Africa) W Ferreira | 6 | 6
(Chile) M Ríos | 6 | 4
(Romania) A Voinea | 3 | 1^{r}

Quarterfinals
9 | (South Africa) W Ferreira | 5 | 5
(Chile) M Ríos | 7 | 7
