= Tommy Ho =

American tennis player

- Full name: Thomas Ho
- Country (sports): United States
- Residence: Houston, Texas, U.S.
- Born: June 17, 1973 (age 53) Winter Haven, Florida, U.S.
- Height: 6 ft 0 in (1.83 m)
- Turned pro: 1988
- Retired: 1998
- Plays: Left-handed (two-handed backhand)
- Prize money: $793,819

Singles
- Career record: 36–66
- Career titles: 0
- Highest ranking: No. 85 (26 June 1995)

Grand Slam singles results
- Australian Open: 2R (1995)
- French Open: 1R (1995)
- Wimbledon: 2R (1995)
- US Open: 3R (1992)

Doubles
- Career record: 57–40
- Career titles: 4
- Highest ranking: No. 13 (8 January 1996)

Grand Slam doubles results
- Australian Open: 3R (1996)
- French Open: SF (1995)
- Wimbledon: 2R (1995)
- US Open: 3R (1994)

Grand Slam mixed doubles results
- Australian Open: 2R (1996)

Tommy Ho
- Traditional Chinese: 何思模
- Simplified Chinese: 何思模
Transcriptions
Standard Mandarin
- Hanyu Pinyin: hé sīmó
- Wade–Giles: Ho^{2} Ssŭ^{1}-mo^{2}

Thomas Ho (born June 17, 1973, in Winter Haven, Florida) is an American former professional tennis player.

== Tennis career ==
=== Juniors ===
Ho first came to the tennis world's attention as an exceptionally successful junior player. He won several junior tennis events in the 1980s, and set a number of 'youngest-ever' records.

=== Pro tour ===
In August 1988, Ho became the youngest male player in the open era to play in the main draw of the US Open singles at the age of 15 years and 2 months. He lost the first round match to Johan Kriek 6–4, 7–6, 7–6. That same month, Ho became the second youngest male player to win a main draw match at a top-level tour event when he beat Matt Anger in the first round at Rye Brook 6–4, 3–6, 6–4, just after Argentina's Franco Davín.

Ho's early successes drew many comparisons with Michael Chang, another Asian American tennis player who achieved great success as a junior. However Ho did not manage to make the same kind of impact on the professional circuit as Chang (who went on to win the French Open and reach the World No. 2 singles ranking). Ho enjoyed some success in satellite tournaments, but did not win any top-level singles events on the tour. He did, however, win four tour doubles titles (Beijing in 1994, and Beijing, Hong Kong and Indian Wells in 1995).

Ho's professional career was hampered by injuries. In 1995, Ho and Brett Steven became the fastest-ever losers of a match at Wimbledon. In the very first point of their men's doubles match, Steven served and Ho tried to intercept the return at the net, only to injure his back. The pair thus had had to forfeit the match after just one rally, which had lasted all of five seconds. The back injury was to recur again in future years, and eventually led to Ho's retirement from the tour in 1997.

During his professional career, Ho reached career-high rankings of World No. 85 in singles and World No. 13 in doubles. His career prize-money totalled $793,819.

== Post-retirement ==
Since retiring from the tour, Ho has completed a degree at Rice University in Houston and worked as a tennis journalist.

In 2011, Ho was inducted into the USTA Florida Hall of Fame.

After working as a partner at global recruiting firm Heidrick & Struggles, he was the Chief Talent Officer at Quantum Energy Partners.

== ATP career finals ==
=== Doubles: 7 (4 titles, 3 runner-ups) ===
Legend Grand Slam Tournaments (0–0) ATP World Tour Finals (0–0) ATP Masters Series (1–0) ATP Championship Series (0–1) ATP World Series (3–2)	Finals by surface Hard (2–2) Clay (0–0) Grass (0–0) Carpet (2–1)	Finals by setting Outdoors (2–1) Indoors (2–2)

Result	W–L	Date	Tournament	Tier	Surface	Partner	Opponents	Score
Win	1–0	Oct 1994	Beijing, China	World Series	Carpet	(United States) Kent Kinnear	(South Africa) David Adams (Russia) Andrei Olhovskiy	7–6, 6–3
Loss	1–1	Feb 1995	Memphis, United States	Championship Series	Hard	(New Zealand) Brett Steven	(United States) Jared Palmer (United States) Richey Reneberg	6–4, 6–7, 1–6
Win	2–1	Mar 1995	Indian Wells, United States	Masters Series	Hard	(New Zealand) Brett Steven	(South Africa) Gary Muller (South Africa) Pieter Norval	6–4, 7–6
Win	3–1	Apr 1995	Hong Kong, Hong Kong	World Series	Hard	(Australia) Mark Philippoussis	(Australia) John Fitzgerald (Sweden) Anders Järryd	6–1, 6–7^{(2–7)}, 7–6^{(7–3)}
Win	4–1	Oct 1995	Beijing, China	World Series	Carpet	(Canada) Sébastien Lareau	(Belgium) Dick Norman (Netherlands) Fernon Wibier	7–6, 7–6
Loss	4–2	Nov 1995	Moscow, Russia	World Series	Carpet	(New Zealand) Brett Steven	(Zimbabwe) Byron Black (United States) Jared Palmer	4–6, 6–3, 3–6
Loss	4–3	Jan 1996	Adelaide, Australia	World Series	Hard	(Sweden) Jonas Björkman	(Australia) Todd Woodbridge (Australia) Mark Woodforde	5–7, 6–7

== ATP Challenger and ITF Futures Finals ==
=== Singles: 8 (4–4) ===
Legend ATP Challenger (4–4) ITF Futures (0–0)	Finals by surface Hard (4–4) Clay (0–0) Grass (0–0) Carpet (0–0)

Result	W–L	Date	Tournament	Tier	Surface	Opponent	Score
Win	1–0	Oct 1990	Ponte Vedra, United States	Challenger	Hard	(Canada) Chris Pridham	7–6, 6–4
Loss	1–1	Sep 1991	Bloomfield Hills, United States	Challenger	Hard	(Canada) Chris Pridham	3–6, 4–6
Win	2–1	Dec 1992	Hong Kong	Challenger	Hard	(Canada) Greg Rusedski	4–6, 6–4, 7–6
Loss	2–2	Jan 1993	Wellington, New Zealand	Challenger	Hard	(Zimbabwe) Byron Black	4–6, 6–4, 1–6
Loss	2–3	Dec 1993	Kuala Lumpur, Malaysia	Challenger	Hard	(Germany) Alexander Mronz	1–6, 0–6
Win	3–3	Sep 1994	Singapore, Singapore	Challenger	Hard	(United Kingdom) Chris Wilkinson	6–3, 6–4
Win	4–3	Mar 1995	Indian Wells, United States	Challenger	Hard	(Germany) Oliver Gross	6–7, 7–6, 6–2
Loss	4–4	Jul 1997	Flushing Meadows, United States	Challenger	Hard	(Italy) Gianluca Pozzi	1–6, 4–6

=== Doubles: 6 (4–2) ===
Legend ATP Challenger (4–2) ITF Futures (0–0)	Finals by surface Hard (2–2) Clay (2–0) Grass (0–0) Carpet (0–0)

Result	W–L	Date	Tournament	Tier	Surface	Partner	Opponents	Score
Loss	0–1	May 1992	Kuala Lumpur, Malaysia	Challenger	Hard	(Australia) Patrick Rafter	(Australia) Jamie Morgan (Australia) Sandon Stolle	4–6, 6–7
Win	1–1	May 1993	Taipei, Taiwan	Challenger	Hard	(Australia) Patrick Rafter	(United States) Kent Kinnear (United States) Kenny Thorne	6–4, 7–6
Win	2–1	Dec 1993	Hong Kong, Hong Kong	Challenger	Hard	(Japan) Shuzo Matsuoka	(Germany) Dirk Dier (Germany) Alexander Mronz	2–3 ret.
Win	3–1	Jun 1994	Weiden, Germany	Challenger	Clay	(Portugal) Nuno Marques	(Israel) Eyal Ran (Chile) Gabriel Silberstein	6–3, 6–1
Win	4–1	Jun 1994	Košice, Slovakia	Challenger	Clay	(Sweden) Mikael Tillström	(Portugal) Emanuel Couto (Portugal) Bernardo Mota	7–6, 6–1
Loss	4–2	Jan 1995	Wellington, New Zealand	Challenger	Hard	(United States) Kenny Thorne	(The Bahamas) Mark Knowles (Canada) Daniel Nestor	6–1, 4–6, 6–7

== Performance timelines ==
Key
W	F	SF	QF	#R	RR	Q#	DNQ	A	NH

(W) winner; (F) finalist; (SF) semifinalist; (QF) quarterfinalist; (#R) rounds 4, 3, 2, 1; (RR) round-robin stage; (Q#) qualification round; (DNQ) did not qualify; (A) absent; (NH) not held; (SR) strike rate (events won / competed); (W–L) win–loss record.

=== Singles ===
Tournament	1988	1989	1990	1991	1992	1993	1994	1995	1996	1997	1998	SR	W–L	Win %
Grand Slam tournaments
Australian Open	A	A	A	Q1	A	1R	1R	2R	Q2	A	A	0 / 2	1–2	33%
French Open	A	A	A	A	A	A	Q1	1R	A	A	A	0 / 1	0–1	0%
Wimbledon	A	A	A	A	A	1R	A	2R	A	A	Q1	0 / 2	1–2	33%
US Open	1R	A	2R	A	3R	1R	1R	A	A	1R	A	0 / 6	3–6	33%
Win–loss	0–1	0–0	1–1	0–0	2–1	0–3	0–2	2–3	0–0	0–1	0–0	0 / 12	5–12	29%
ATP Masters Series
Indian Wells	A	A	A	A	A	A	Q2	2R	A	A	A	0 / 1	1–1	50%
Miami	A	A	A	A	A	A	Q2	3R	A	A	A	0 / 1	2–1	67%
Canada	A	1R	A	A	A	1R	A	A	A	A	A	0 / 2	0–2	0%
Cincinnati	A	A	A	A	Q1	Q1	Q3	1R	A	A	A	0 / 1	0–1	0%
Paris	A	A	A	A	A	A	A	Q3	A	A	A	0 / 0	0–0	–
Win–loss	0–0	0–1	0–0	0–0	0–0	0–1	0–0	3–3	0–0	0–0	0–0	0 / 5	3–5	38%

=== Doubles ===
Tournament	1991	1992	1993	1994	1995	1996	1997	SR	W–L	Win %
Grand Slam tournaments
Australian Open	A	A	A	A	2R	3R	A	0 / 2	3–2	60%
French Open	A	A	A	A	SF	A	A	0 / 1	4–1	80%
Wimbledon	A	A	Q3	A	2R	A	A	0 / 1	1–1	50%
US Open	2R	2R	1R	Q1	A	A	Q1	0 / 3	2–3	40%
Win–loss	1–1	1–1	0–1	0–0	6–3	2–1	0–0	0 / 7	10–7	59%
Year-end Championships
ATP Finals	Did not qualify				RR	DNQ		0 / 1	1–2	33%
ATP Masters Series
Indian Wells	A	A	A	A	W	A	1R	1 / 2	5–1	83%
Miami	A	A	A	A	3R	A	1R	0 / 2	1–2	33%
Canada	A	A	Q2	A	A	A	A	0 / 0	0–0	–
Cincinnati	A	2R	A	A	2R	A	A	0 / 2	2–2	50%
Paris	A	A	A	A	2R	A	A	0 / 1	2–1	50%
Win–loss	0–0	1–1	0–0	0–0	8–3	0–0	0–2	1 / 7	9–6	60%
