= 1996 Newsweek Champions Cup – Doubles =

Doubles
- 1996 Newsweek Champions Cup

Final
- Champions: (Australia) Todd Woodbridge (Australia) Mark Woodforde
- Runners-up: (United States) Brian MacPhie (Australia) Michael Tebbutt
- Score: 1–6, 6–2, 6–2

Details
- Draw: 28
- Seeds: 8

Events
Singles	Doubles
← 1995 ·	Newsweek Champions Cup	· 1997 →

Tommy Ho and Brett Steven were the defending champions but only Steven competed that year with Sandon Stolle.

Steven and Stolle lost in the first round to Jonas Björkman and Stefan Edberg.

Todd Woodbridge and Mark Woodforde won in the final 1–6, 6–2, 6–2 against Brian MacPhie and Michael Tebbutt.

== Seeds ==
The top four seeded teams received byes into the second round.

1. (Australia) Todd Woodbridge / (Australia) Mark Woodforde (champions)
2. (Netherlands) Jacco Eltingh / (Netherlands) Paul Haarhuis (quarterfinals)
3. (The Bahamas) Mark Knowles / (Canada) Daniel Nestor (second round)
4. (Zimbabwe) Byron Black / (Canada) Grant Connell (semifinals)
5. (United States) Rick Leach / (United States) Scott Melville (first round)
6. (France) Guy Forget / (Switzerland) Jakob Hlasek (second round)
7. (New Zealand) Brett Steven / (Australia) Sandon Stolle (first round)
8. (United States) Todd Martin / (United States) Jonathan Stark (second round)

== Draw ==
=== Key ===
- Q = Qualifier
- WC = Wild card
- LL = Lucky loser
- Alt = Alternate
- SE = Special exempt
- PR = Protected ranking
- ITF = ITF entry
- JE = Junior exempt
- w/o = Walkover
- r = Retired
- d = Defaulted
- SR = Special ranking

=== Final ===
Semifinals

Final

1
- (Australia) Todd Woodbridge
- (Australia) Mark Woodforde
6
6

4
- (Zimbabwe) Byron Black
- (Canada) Grant Connell
3
3

1
- (Australia) Todd Woodbridge
- (Australia) Mark Woodforde
1
6
6

- (United States) Brian MacPhie
- (Australia) Michael Tebbutt
6
2
2

- (United States) Brian MacPhie
- (Australia) Michael Tebbutt
7
6

- (United States) Trevor Kronemann
- (Australia) David Macpherson
6
4

=== Top half ===
First round

Second round

Quarterfinals

Semifinals

1
- (Australia) T Woodbridge
- (Australia) M Woodforde
7
3
6

- (Netherlands) T Nijssen
- (United States) G Van Emburgh
6
5
2

- (South Africa) W Ferreira
- (South Africa) G Muller
5
6
4

- (South Africa) W Ferreira
- (South Africa) G Muller
4
7
6

1
- (Australia) T Woodbridge
- (Australia) M Woodforde
7
4
6

- (Argentina) L Lobo
- (Spain) J Sánchez
2
7
6

- (United States) J Grabb
- (United States) R Reneberg
6
6
3

- (United States) J Grabb
- (United States) R Reneberg
6
5
7

- (United States) J Grabb
- (United States) R Reneberg
6
7

WC
- (France) A Boetsch
- (Switzerland) M Rosset
4
7
6

8
- (United States) T Martin
- (United States) J Stark
2
5

8
- (United States) T Martin
- (United States) J Stark
6
5
7

1
- (Australia) T Woodbridge
- (Australia) M Woodforde
6
6

4
- (Zimbabwe) B Black
- (Canada) G Connell
3
3

4
- (Zimbabwe) B Black
- (Canada) G Connell
6
6

WC
- (Australia) T Budgen
- (Australia) B Sceney
2
3

- (Italy) A Gaudenzi
- (Croatia) G Ivanišević
2
3

- (Italy) A Gaudenzi
- (Croatia) G Ivanišević
6
6

4
- (Zimbabwe) B Black
- (Canada) G Connell
7
6

LL
- (United States) K Flach
- (United States) K Jones
6
1
4

Q
- (Australia) P Kilderry
- (South Africa) M Ondruska
5
1

Q
- (Australia) P Kilderry
- (South Africa) M Ondruska
1
6
6

Q
- (Australia) P Kilderry
- (South Africa) M Ondruska
6
1
6

WC
- (United States) J Courier
- (United States) A O'Brien
6
6
7

WC
- (United States) J Courier
- (United States) A O'Brien
3
6
2

5
- (United States) R Leach
- (United States) S Melville
0
7
5

=== Bottom half ===
First round

Second round

Quarterfinals

Semifinals

6
- (France) G Forget
- (Switzerland) J Hlasek
6
6

- (Argentina) J Frana
- (Spain) E Sánchez
3
4

6
- (France) G Forget
- (Switzerland) J Hlasek
4
6
4

WC
- (United States) A Agassi
- (United States) P Galbraith
3
7
5

- (United States) B MacPhie
- (Australia) M Tebbutt
6
3
6

- (United States) B MacPhie
- (Australia) M Tebbutt
6
5
7

- (United States) B MacPhie
- (Australia) M Tebbutt
6
6

- (South Africa) J-L de Jager
- (South Africa) E Ferreira
6
6

- (South Africa) J-L de Jager
- (South Africa) E Ferreira
3
4

- (United States) K Kinnear
- (United States) D Randall
1
3

- (South Africa) J-L de Jager
- (South Africa) E Ferreira
6
6
6

3
- (The Bahamas) M Knowles
- (Canada) D Nestor
7
3
4

- (United States) B MacPhie
- (Australia) M Tebbutt
7
6

7
- (New Zealand) B Steven
- (Australia) S Stolle
4
6

- (United States) T Kronemann
- (Australia) D Macpherson
6
4

- (Sweden) J Björkman
- (Sweden) S Edberg
6
7

- (Sweden) J Björkman
- (Sweden) S Edberg
2
6

Q
- (United States) J Belloli
- (India) L Paes
3
6
3

- (United States) T Kronemann
- (Australia) D Macpherson
6
7

- (United States) T Kronemann
- (Australia) D Macpherson
6
3
6

- (United States) T Kronemann
- (Australia) D Macpherson
1
6
6

- (Australia) J Eagle
- (Australia) A Florent
6
2
7

2
- (Netherlands) J Eltingh
- (Netherlands) P Haarhuis
6
3
2

- (United States) L Jensen
- (United States) M Jensen
3
6
6

- (Australia) J Eagle
- (Australia) A Florent
7
4
6

2
- (Netherlands) J Eltingh
- (Netherlands) P Haarhuis
6
6
7
