= 1996 State Farm Evert Cup – Singles =

Singles
- 1996 State Farm Evert Cup

Final
- Champion: (Germany) Steffi Graf
- Runner-up: (Spain) Conchita Martínez
- Score: 7–6^{(7–5)}, 7–6^{(7–5)}

Details
- Draw: 56
- Seeds: 16

Events
Singles	Doubles
- State Farm Evert Cup

Steffi Graf defeated Conchita Martínez in the final, 7–6^{(7–5)}, 7–6^{(7–5)} to win the women's singles tennis title at the 1996 Indian Wells Masters.

Mary Joe Fernández was the defending champion, but lost in the third round to Nathalie Tauziat.

== Seeds ==
A champion seed is indicated in bold text while text in italics indicates the round in which that seed was eliminated. The top nine seeds received a bye to the second round.

1. (Germany) **Steffi Graf (champion)**
2. (Spain) Conchita Martínez (final)
3. n/a
4. (Japan) Kimiko Date (semifinals)
5. (United States) Chanda Rubin (quarterfinals)
6. (Netherlands) Brenda Schultz-McCarthy (third round)
7. (United States) Lindsay Davenport (semifinals)
8. (United States) Mary Joe Fernández (third round)
9. (South Africa) Amanda Coetzer (quarterfinals)
10. (France) Julie Halard-Decugis (third round)
11. (United States) Amy Frazier (first round)
12. (United States) Zina Garrison-Jackson (first round)
13. (France) Nathalie Tauziat (quarterfinals)
14. (Romania) Irina Spîrlea (third round)
15. (Austria) Judith Wiesner (third round)
16. (United States) Lisa Raymond (second round)
17. (Japan) Naoko Sawamatsu (second round)

== Draw ==
Key

- Q = Qualifier
- WC = Wild card
- LL = Lucky loser
- Alt = Alternate
- ITF = ITF entry
- PR = Protected ranking
- SR = Special ranking
- SE = Special exempt
- JE = Junior exempt
- JR = Junior Accelerator Programme entrant
- CO = College Accelerator Programme entrant
- NG = Next Gen Accelerator Program entrant
- w/o = Walkover
- r = Retired
- d = Defaulted

=== Finals ===
Semifinals
1	(Germany) **Steffi Graf**	6^{6}	**7^{7}**	**6**
7	(United States) Lindsay Davenport	**7^{8}**	6^{3}	4
4	(Japan) Kimiko Date	0	4
2	(Spain) **Conchita Martínez**	**6**	**6**

Final
1	(Germany) **Steffi Graf**	**7^{7}**	**7^{7}**
2	(Spain) Conchita Martínez	6^{5}	6^{5}

=== Top half ===
==== Section 1 ====
First round
(Czech Republic) L Richterová	4	3
WC	(Sweden) **K Triska**	**6**	**6**
(Mexico) **A Gavaldón**	**6**	**6**
Q	(Venezuela) M Vento	4	3
Q	(United States) V Williams	2	4
10	(France) **J Halard-Decugis**	**6**	**6**
14	(Romania) **I Spîrlea**	**6**	**6**
(Italy) A Serra Zanetti	4	2
(Germany) **S Hack**	**6**	**6**
(Germany) C Singer	3	3
Q	(Romania) C Cristea	1	**6**	1
WC	(United States) **M Tu**	**6**	4	**6**

Second round
1	(Germany) **S Graf**	**6**	**6**
WC	(Sweden) K Triska	0	1
(Mexico) A Gavaldón	1	**6**	4
10	(France) **J Halard-Decugis**	**6**	3	**6**
14	(Romania) **I Spîrlea**	**7**	**7**
(Germany) S Hack	5	5
WC	(United States) M Tu	1	1
9	(South Africa) **A Coetzer**	**6**	**6**

Third round
1	(Germany) **S Graf**	**6**	**7**
10	(France) J Halard-Decugis	3	5
14	(Romania) I Spîrlea	2	1
9	(South Africa) **A Coetzer**	**6**	**6**

Quarterfinals
1	(Germany) **S Graf**	**6**	**6**
9	(South Africa) A Coetzer	4	1

==== Section 2 ====
First round
(Australia) **N Bradtke**	**6**	2	**6**
(Austria) B Schett	4	**6**	3
(Italy) R Grande	4	1
(United States) **J Capriati**	**6**	**6**
(Chinese Taipei) **S-T Wang**	**6**	**6**
11	(United States) A Frazier	0	2
15	(Austria) **J Wiesner**	**6**	**7^{7}**
Q	(China) F Li	3	6^{1}
(Russia) **E Likhovtseva**	**7^{7}**	2	**6**
(Poland) K Nowak	6^{5}	**6**	4
(United States) M Werdel-Witmeyer	4	5
(South Africa) **M de Swardt**	**6**	**7**

Second round
5	(United States) **C Rubin**	**6**	**6**
(Australia) N Bradtke	2	0
(United States) **J Capriati**	**6**	**6**
(Chinese Taipei) S-T Wang	0	0
15	(Austria) **J Wiesner**	**6**	**6**
(Russia) E Likhovtseva	4	2
(South Africa) M de Swardt	3	5
7	(United States) **L Davenport**	**6**	**7**

Third round
5	(United States) **C Rubin**	**6**	**6**
(United States) J Capriati	3	3
15	(Austria) J Wiesner	6^{6}	1
7	(United States) **L Davenport**	**7^{8}**	**6**

Quarterfinals
5	(United States) C Rubin	0	3
7	(United States) **L Davenport**	**6**	**6**

=== Bottom half ===
==== Section 3 ====
First round
LL	(Israel) **A Smashnova**	5	**7**	**6**
(Argentina) I Gorrochategui	**7**	5	3
Q	(Spain) Á Montolio	2	0
(France) **S Testud**	**6**	**6**
Q	(France) A Dechaume-Balleret	**6**	1	4
13	(France) **N Tauziat**	4	**6**	**6**
17	(Japan) **N Sawamatsu**	**6**	**6**
WC	(United States) A Stevenson	3	0
Q	(Latvia) **L Neiland**	3	**6**	**6**
(United States) G Fernández	**6**	3	2
LL	(Japan) N Kijimuta	**7**	4	3
(Romania) **R Dragomir**	5	**6**	**6**

Second round
8	(United States) **M J Fernández**	**6**	2	**6**
LL	(Israel) A Smashnova	0	**6**	1
(France) S Testud	0	6^{6}
13	(France) **N Tauziat**	**6**	**7^{8}**
17	(Japan) N Sawamatsu	5	**6**	2
Q	(Latvia) **L Neiland**	**7**	1	**6**
(Romania) R Dragomir	**7^{7}**	1	2
4	(Japan) **K Date**	6^{5}	**6**	**6**

Third round
8	(United States) M J Fernández	6^{3}	4
13	(France) **N Tauziat**	**7^{7}**	**6**
Q	(Latvia) L Neiland	4	0
4	(Japan) **K Date**	**6**	**6**

Quarterfinals
13	(France) N Tauziat	**7^{7}**	3	3
4	(Japan) **K Date**	6^{2}	**6**	**6**

==== Section 4 ====
First round
Q	(United States) **J Watanabe**	5	**5**
(South Africa) J Kruger	**7**	5	r
(Belgium) N Feber	**6**	3	5
(United States) **L Lee**	4	**6**	**7**
LL	(China) **J-Q Yi**	0	**6**	**6**
12	(United States) Z Garrison-Jackson	**6**	1	4
16	(United States) **L Raymond**	4	**6**	**7**
(Italy) S Farina	**6**	2	5
(Japan) **A Sugiyama**	**6**	**6**
(United States) T Whitlinger-Jones	2	3
(Argentina) **F Labat**	**6**	**6**
(Australia) R McQuillan	3	1

Second round
6	(Netherlands) **B Schultz-McCarthy**	**6**	**6**
Q	(United States) J Watanabe	4	4
(United States) **L Lee**	**6**	**6**
LL	(China) J-Q Yi	4	4
16	(United States) L Raymond	5	**6**	4
(Japan) **A Sugiyama**	**7**	3	**6**
(Argentina) F Labat	1	**6**	2
2	(Spain) **C Martínez**	**6**	2	**6**

Third round
6	(Netherlands) B Schultz-McCarthy	5	**7^{8}**	3
(United States) **L Lee**	**7**	6^{6}	**6**
(Japan) A Sugiyama	0	3
2	(Spain) **C Martínez**	**6**	**6**

Quarterfinals
(United States) L Lee	5	2
2	(Spain) **C Martínez**	**7**	**6**
