= 1995 Newsweek Champions Cup – Doubles =

Doubles
- 1995 Newsweek Champions Cup

Final
- Champions: (United States) Tommy Ho (New Zealand) Brett Steven
- Runners-up: (South Africa) Gary Muller (South Africa) Piet Norval
- Score: 6–4, 7–6

Details
- Draw: 28 (4WC/2Q)
- Seeds: 4

Events
Singles	Doubles
← 1994 ·	Indian Wells Masters	· 1996 →

Grant Connell and Patrick Galbraith were the defending champions, but lost in the quarterfinals this year.

Tommy Ho and Brett Steven won the title, defeating Gary Muller and Piet Norval 6–4, 7–6 in the final.

== Seeds ==
The top four seeds received a bye into the second round.

1. (Canada) Grant Connell / (United States) Patrick Galbraith (quarterfinals)
2. (Australia) Todd Woodbridge / (Australia) Mark Woodforde (semifinals)
3. (Zimbabwe) Byron Black / (United States) Jonathan Stark (second round)
4. (Sweden) Jan Apell / (Sweden) Jonas Björkman (quarterfinals)
5. (United States) Jared Palmer / (United States) Richey Reneberg (first round)
6. (United States) Jim Grabb / (United States) Patrick McEnroe (first round)
7. (The Bahamas) Mark Knowles / (Canada) Daniel Nestor (second round)
8. (United States) Alex O'Brien / (Australia) Sandon Stolle (second round)

== Draw ==
=== Key ===
- Q = Qualifier
- WC = Wild card
- LL = Lucky loser
- Alt = Alternate
- SE = Special exempt
- PR = Protected ranking
- ITF = ITF entry
- JE = Junior exempt
- w/o = Walkover
- r = Retired
- d = Defaulted
- SR = Special ranking

=== Finals ===
Semifinals
WC	(United States) Luke Jensen (United States) Murphy Jensen	3	2
(United States) Tommy Ho (New Zealand) Brett Steven	6	6
(South Africa) Gary Muller (South Africa) Piet Norval	6	5	6
2	(Australia) Todd Woodbridge (Australia) Mark Woodforde	4	7	4

Final
(United States) Tommy Ho (New Zealand) Brett Steven	6	7
(South Africa) Gary Muller (South Africa) Piet Norval	4	6

=== Top half ===
First round
(South Africa) L Bale (South Africa) J-L de Jager	6	6	6
(Argentina) L Lobo (Spain) J Sánchez	1	7	3
WC	(United States) L Jensen (United States) M Jensen	6	6
(Sweden) H Holm (United States) K Kinnear	3	4
(United States) M Bauer (Italy) D Nargiso	4	5
8	(United States) A O'Brien (Australia) S Stolle	6	7
Q	(United Kingdom) N Broad (United States) G Van Emburgh	3	6	7
WC	(United States) P Annacone (United States) P Sampras	6	4	6
(United States) T Ho (New Zealand) B Steven	6	6
Q	(South Africa) M Ondruska (South Africa) G Stafford	3	0
(France) O Delaître (United States) D Wheaton	6	6
6	(United States) J Grabb (United States) P McEnroe	3	3

Second round
1	(Canada) G Connell (United States) P Galbraith	6	6
(South Africa) L Bale (South Africa) J-L de Jager	3	4
WC	(United States) L Jensen (United States) M Jensen	6	6
8	(United States) A O'Brien (Australia) S Stolle	4	4
4	(Sweden) J Apell (Sweden) J Björkman	6	6
Q	(United Kingdom) N Broad (United States) G Van Emburgh	4	4
(United States) T Ho (New Zealand) B Steven	6	6	7
(France) O Delaître (United States) D Wheaton	3	7	6

Quarterfinals
1	(Canada) G Connell (United States) P Galbraith	6	6
WC	(United States) L Jensen (United States) M Jensen	7	7
4	(Sweden) J Apell (Sweden) J Björkman	6	3
(United States) T Ho (New Zealand) B Steven	7	6

Semifinals
WC	(United States) L Jensen (United States) M Jensen	3	2
(United States) T Ho (New Zealand) B Steven	6	6

=== Bottom half ===
First round
5	(United States) J Palmer (United States) R Reneberg	4	6	4
(United States) T Kronemann (Australia) D Macpherson	6	3	6
(Australia) J Fitzgerald (Australia) A Florent	3	6	6
(United States) R Leach (United States) S Melville	6	3	2
(South Africa) G Muller (South Africa) P Norval	7	6
(South Africa) W Ferreira (Germany) M Stich	6	4
7	(The Bahamas) M Knowles (Canada) D Nestor	6	6
(Spain) S Casal (Spain) E Sánchez	1	2
WC	(Germany) B Becker (France) G Forget	6	6
(Czech Republic) P Korda (Czech Republic) K Nováček	4	3
(Sweden) N Kulti (Sweden) M Larsson	6	6
WC	(South Africa) C van Rensburg (South Africa) D Visser	4	2

Second round
(United States) T Kronemann (Australia) D Macpherson	6	2	6
(Australia) J Fitzgerald (Australia) A Florent	3	6	7
(South Africa) G Muller (South Africa) P Norval	6	6	6
3	(Zimbabwe) B Black (United States) J Stark	7	4	2
7	(The Bahamas) M Knowles (Canada) D Nestor	6	5	3
WC	(Germany) B Becker (France) G Forget	3	7	6
(Sweden) N Kulti (Sweden) M Larsson	3	4
2	(Australia) T Woodbridge (Australia) M Woodforde	6	6

Quarterfinals
(Australia) J Fitzgerald (Australia) A Florent	6	7	4
(South Africa) G Muller (South Africa) P Norval	7	6	6
WC	(Germany) B Becker (France) G Forget	3	6	5
2	(Australia) T Woodbridge (Australia) M Woodforde	6	3	7

Semifinals
(South Africa) G Muller (South Africa) P Norval	6	5	6
2	(Australia) T Woodbridge (Australia) M Woodforde	4	7	4

== Qualifying ==
=== Qualifying seeds ===
1. (United Kingdom) Neil Broad / (United States) Greg Van Emburgh (qualified)
2. (South Africa) Brent Haygarth / (South Africa) Byron Talbot (first round)
3. (United States) Scott Davis / (United States) Brian MacPhie (qualifying competition)
4. (India) Leander Paes / (Zimbabwe) Kevin Ullyett (qualifying competition)

=== Qualifiers ===
1. (United Kingdom) Neil Broad / (United States) Greg Van Emburgh
2. (South Africa) Marcos Ondruska / (South Africa) Grant Stafford

=== Qualifying draw ===
==== First qualifier ====
First round					Qualifying competition
1	(United Kingdom) Neil Broad (United States) Greg Van Emburgh	w	/	o
WC	(United States) Kelly Jones (United States) David Pate				1	(United Kingdom) Neil Broad (United States) Greg Van Emburgh	4	6	7
WC	(Sweden) Rikard Bergh (Sweden) Lars-Anders Wahlgren	3	4		3	(United States) Scott Davis (United States) Brian MacPhie	6	3	6
3	(United States) Scott Davis (United States) Brian MacPhie	6	6

==== Second qualifier ====
First round					Qualifying competition
2	(South Africa) Brent Haygarth (South Africa) Byron Talbot	6	3	3
	(South Africa) Marcos Ondruska (South Africa) Grant Stafford	4	6	6		(South Africa) Marcos Ondruska (South Africa) Grant Stafford	7	6
WC	(South Africa) Pieter Aldrich (United States) Mike Fedderly	1	3		4	(India) Leander Paes (Zimbabwe) Kevin Ullyett	6	4
4	(India) Leander Paes (Zimbabwe) Kevin Ullyett	6	6
