= 1997 Newsweek Champions Cup and the State Farm Evert Cup =

1997 Newsweek Champions Cup and State Farm Evert Cup
- Date: March 7–16
- Edition: 24th
- Category: Super 9 (ATP); Tier I Series (WTA)
- Prize money: $2,050,000
- Surface: Hard / outdoor
- Location: Indian Wells, CA, US
- Venue: Grand Champions Resort

Champions

Men's singles
- (United States) Michael Chang

Women's singles
- (United States) Lindsay Davenport

Men's doubles
- (The Bahamas) Mark Knowles / (Canada) Daniel Nestor

Women's doubles
- (United States) Lindsay Davenport / (Belarus) Natasha Zvereva
← 1996 ·	Newsweek Champions Cup	· 1998 →
← 1996 ·	State Farm Evert Cup	· 1998 →

The 1997 Newsweek Champions Cup and the State Farm Evert Cup were tennis tournaments played on outdoor hard courts that were part of the Mercedes Super 9 of the 1997 ATP Tour and of Tier I of the 1997 WTA Tour. Both the men's and women's events took place at the Grand Champions Resort in Indian Wells, California in the United States from March 7 through March 16, 1997.

== Finals ==
=== Men's singles ===
(United States) Michael Chang defeated (Czech Republic) Bohdan Ulihrach 4–6, 6–3, 6–4, 6–3

- It was Chang's 2nd title of the year and the 28th of his career. It was his 1st Masters title of the year and his 7th overall. It was also his 3rd title at the event after winning in 1992 and 1996.

=== Women's singles ===
(United States) Lindsay Davenport defeated (Romania) Irina Spîrlea 6–2, 6–1

- It was Davenport's 3rd title of the year and the 21st of her career. It was her 1st Tier I title.

=== Men's doubles ===
(The Bahamas) Mark Knowles / (Canada) Daniel Nestor defeated (Australia) Mark Philippoussis / (Australia) Patrick Rafter 7–6, 4–6, 7–5

- It was Knowles' 1st title of the year and the 10th of his career. It was Nestor's 1st title of the year and the 7th of his career.

=== Women's doubles ===
(United States) Lindsay Davenport / (Belarus) Natasha Zvereva defeated (United States) Lisa Raymond / (France) Nathalie Tauziat 6–3, 6–2

- It was Davenport's 4th title of the year and the 22nd of her career. It was Zvereva's 3rd title of the year and the 65th of her career.
