= 1995 Newsweek Champions Cup – Singles =

Singles
- 1995 Newsweek Champions Cup

Final
- Champion: (United States) Pete Sampras
- Runner-up: (United States) Andre Agassi
- Score: 7–5, 6–3, 7–5

Details
- Draw: 56
- Seeds: 16

Events
Singles	Doubles
← 1994 ·	Newsweek Champions Cup	· 1996 →

Defending champion Pete Sampras defeated Andre Agassi in the final, 7–5, 6–3, 7–5 to win the men's singles tennis title at the 1995 Indian Wells Masters.

== Seeds ==
1. (United States) Pete Sampras (champion)
2. (United States) Andre Agassi (final)
3. (Germany) Boris Becker (semifinals)
4. (United States) Michael Chang (third round)
5. (Spain) Alberto Berasategui (third round)
6. (Germany) Michael Stich (third round)
7. (South Africa) Wayne Ferreira (quarterfinals)
8. (United States) Todd Martin (quarterfinals)
9. (United States) Jim Courier (second round)
10. (Ukraine) Andriy Medvedev (second round)
11. (Sweden) Stefan Edberg (semifinals)
12. (Sweden) Magnus Larsson (quarterfinals)
13. (Italy) Andrea Gaudenzi (second round)
14. (Austria) Thomas Muster (quarterfinals)
15. (Australia) Patrick Rafter (third round)
16. (Czech Republic) Petr Korda (second round)

== Draw ==
=== Key ===
- Q = Qualifier
- WC = Wild card
- LL = Lucky loser
- Alt = Alternate
- SE = Special exempt
- PR = Protected ranking
- ITF = ITF entry
- JE = Junior exempt
- w/o = Walkover
- r = Retired
- d = Defaulted
- SR = Special ranking

=== Finals ===
Quarterfinals
1	(United States) Pete Sampras	6	6
8	(United States) Todd Martin	3	4
14	(Austria) Thomas Muster	6	4	1
11	(Sweden) Stefan Edberg	2	6	6
12	(Sweden) Magnus Larsson	6	1	4
3	(Germany) Boris Becker	3	6	6
7	(South Africa) Wayne Ferreira	3	4
2	(United States) Andre Agassi	6	6

Semifinals
1	(United States) Pete Sampras	4	6	6
11	(Sweden) Stefan Edberg	6	3	4
3	(Germany) Boris Becker	4	6^{4}
2	(United States) Andre Agassi	6	7^{7}

Final
1	(United States) Pete Sampras	7	6	7
2	(United States) Andre Agassi	5	3	5

=== Top half ===
==== Section 1 ====
First round
(Sweden) J Björkman	7	6
(Czech Republic) K Nováček	5	2
WC	(United States) T Ho	6	6
(Peru) J Yzaga	4	4
(Spain) Á Corretja	6	5	2
15	(Australia) P Rafter	2	7	6
10	(Ukraine) A Medvedev	7^{7}	6
WC	(Germany) O Gross	6^{4}	2
(United States) D Wheaton	6	6
(France) C Pioline	3	1
(Russia) A Chesnokov	5	3
(Austria) H Skoff	7	6

Second round
1	(United States) P Sampras	6	7^{7}
(Sweden) J Björkman	3	6^{5}
WC	(United States) T Ho	3	6	5
15	(Australia) P Rafter	6	2	7
10	(Ukraine) A Medvedev	6	2	6^{4}
(United States) D Wheaton	4	6	7^{7}
(Austria) H Skoff	2	2
8	(United States) T Martin	6	6

Third round
1	(United States) P Sampras	6	6^{8}	6
15	(Australia) P Rafter	4	7^{10}	1
(United States) D Wheaton	6^{5}	6	5
8	(United States) T Martin	7^{7}	4	7

Quarterfinals
1	(United States) P Sampras	6	6
8	(United States) T Martin	3	4

==== Section 2 ====
First round
(France) G Forget	6^{10}	6	7
(France) O Delaître	7^{12}	1	5
(United States) C Adams	7^{7}	6
Q	(United States) J Grabb	6^{3}	2
(Germany) B Karbacher	4	2
14	(Austria) T Muster	6	6
11	(Sweden) S Edberg	6	4	6
Q	(Italy) D Sanguinetti	3	6	3
(France) A Boetsch	6	6
WC	(United States) A Peterson	1	2
(France) F Santoro	6	1	6
Q	(Australia) T Woodbridge	4	6	1

Second round
4	(United States) M Chang	6	6
(France) G Forget	3	2
(United States) C Adams	2	6^{0}
14	(Austria) T Muster	6	7^{7}
11	(Sweden) S Edberg	6	6
(France) A Boetsch	3	4
(France) F Santoro	6	3	4
5	(Spain) A Berasategui	3	6	6

Third round
4	(United States) M Chang	1	7	6^{3}
14	(Austria) T Muster	6	5	7^{7}
11	(Sweden) S Edberg	6	6
5	(Spain) A Berasategui	1	2

Quarterfinals
14	(Austria) T Muster	6	4	1
11	(Sweden) S Edberg	2	6	6

=== Bottom half ===
==== Section 3 ====
First round
Q	(France) J Golmard	3	1
(United States) R Reneberg	6	6
Q	(France) L Roux	6	6
(Australia) J Stoltenberg	4	3
WC	(Spain) E Sánchez	4	2
12	(Sweden) M Larsson	6	6
13	(Italy) A Gaudenzi	2	6	7^{7}
(Australia) R Fromberg	6	2	6^{2}
Q	(Chile) M Ríos	6	7^{7}
(Italy) R Furlan	1	6^{5}
Q	(United States) V Spadea	4	4
(United States) J Palmer	6	6

Second round
6	(Germany) M Stich	1	7^{7}	6
(United States) R Reneberg	6	6^{4}	3
Q	(France) L Roux	2	2
12	(Sweden) M Larsson	6	6
13	(Italy) A Gaudenzi	3	0
Q	(Chile) M Ríos	6	6
(United States) J Palmer	4	4
3	(Germany) B Becker	6	6

Third round
6	(Germany) M Stich	7	6^{6}	6^{5}
12	(Sweden) M Larsson	5	7^{8}	7^{7}
Q	(Chile) M Ríos	3	2^{r}
3	(Germany) B Becker	6	3

Quarterfinals
12	(Sweden) M Larsson	6	1	4
3	(Germany) B Becker	3	6	6

==== Section 4 ====
First round
(Spain) F Clavet	6	6
(United States) M Washington	2	3
(Spain) Á Costa	3	3
(Spain) C Costa	6	6
(Germany) M Zoecke	3	5
9	(United States) J Courier	6	7
16	(Czech Republic) P Korda	6	6
(United States) A Krickstein	2	0
(Australia) M Woodforde	3	4
(Sweden) T Enqvist	6	6
(Spain) J Sánchez	4	6	5
WC	(Sweden) M Wilander	6	2	7

Second round
7	(South Africa) W Ferreira	6	3	6
(Spain) F Clavet	3	6	4
(Spain) C Costa	7^{8}	6
9	(United States) J Courier	6^{6}	3
16	(Czech Republic) P Korda	2	5
(Sweden) T Enqvist	6	7
WC	(Sweden) M Wilander	0	2
2	(United States) A Agassi	6	6

Third round
7	(South Africa) W Ferreira	6	6
(Spain) C Costa	3	2
(Sweden) T Enqvist	1	3
2	(United States) A Agassi	6	6

Quarterfinals
7	(South Africa) W Ferreira	3	4
2	(United States) A Agassi	6	6

== See also ==
- Agassi–Sampras rivalry
