= 1994 Newsweek Champions Cup and the Evert Cup =

1994 Newsweek Champions Cup and Evert Cup
- Date: February 21–27 (ATP); February 28 – March 7 (WTA)
- Edition: 21st
- Category: Super 9 (ATP); Tier II Series (WTA)
- Prize money: $1,470,000 (ATP) $400,000 (WTA)
- Surface: Hard / outdoor
- Location: Indian Wells, CA, U.S.
- Venue: Grand Champions Resort

Champions

Men's singles
- (United States) Pete Sampras

Women's singles
- (Germany) Steffi Graf

Men's doubles
- (Canada) Grant Connell / (United States) Patrick Galbraith

Women's doubles
- (United States) Lindsay Davenport / (United States) Lisa Raymond
← 1993 ·	Newsweek Champions Cup	· 1995 →
← 1993 ·	Evert Cup	· 1995 →

The 1994 Newsweek Champions Cup and the Evert Cup were tennis tournaments played on outdoor hard courts. It was the 21st edition of the Indian Wells Masters and was part of the Super 9 of the 1994 ATP Tour and of Tier II of the 1994 WTA Tour. They were held at the Grand Champions Resort in Indian Wells, California, in the United States, with the women's tournament played from February 21 through February 27, 1994, while the men's tournament was played from February 28 through March 7, 1994.

The men singles was headlined by world No. 1 Pete Sampras, Jim Courier and Stefan Edberg. Other top seeds were Sergi Bruguera, Goran Ivanišević, Michael Chang, Todd Martin and Thomas Muster.

The women's draw featured world No. 1 Steffi Graf, Mary Joe Fernández, and Lindsay Davenport. Other top seeds present were Natasha Zvereva, Helena Suková, and Amanda Coetzer.

== Finals ==
=== Men's singles ===
(United States) Pete Sampras defeated (Czech Republic) Petr Korda 4–6, 6–3, 3–6, 6–3, 6–2

- It was Sampras' 3rd title of the year and the 25th of his career. It was his 1st Masters title of the year and his 3rd overall.

=== Women's singles ===
(Germany) Steffi Graf defeated (South Africa) Amanda Coetzer 6–0, 6–4

- It was Graf's 3rd singles title of the year and the 82nd of her career.

=== Men's doubles ===
(Canada) Grant Connell / (United States) Patrick Galbraith defeated (Zimbabwe) Byron Black / (United States) Jonathan Stark 7–5, 6–3

- It was Connell's 1st title of the year and the 8th of his career. It was Galbraith's 1st title of the year and the 16th of his career.

=== Women's doubles ===
(United States) Lindsay Davenport / (United States) Lisa Raymond defeated (Netherlands) Manon Bollegraf / (Czech Republic) Helena Suková 6–2, 6–4

- It was Davenport's 2nd title of the year and the 3rd of her career. It was Raymond's only title of the year and the 2nd of her career.
