= 1994 Newsweek Champions Cup – Doubles =

Doubles
- 1994 Newsweek Champions Cup

Final
- Champions: (Canada) Grant Connell (United States) Patrick Galbraith
- Runners-up: (Zimbabwe) Byron Black (United States) Jonathan Stark
- Score: 7–5, 6–3

Details
- Draw: 28
- Seeds: 8

Events
Singles	Doubles
- Newsweek Champions Cup

Guy Forget and Henri Leconte were the defending champions, but did not participate this year.

Grant Connell and Patrick Galbraith won the title, defeating Byron Black and Jonathan Stark 7–5, 6–3 in the final.

== Seeds ==
1. (Zimbabwe) Byron Black / (United States) Jonathan Stark (final)
2. (Canada) Grant Connell / (United States) Patrick Galbraith (champions)
3. (Australia) Todd Woodbridge / (Australia) Mark Woodforde (quarterfinals)
4. (United States) Ken Flach / (United States) Rick Leach (second round)
5. (United States) Luke Jensen / (United States) Murphy Jensen (second round)
6. (Sweden) Stefan Edberg / (Czech Republic) Petr Korda (first round)
7. (United States) Patrick McEnroe / (United States) Richey Reneberg (second round)
8. (Spain) Sergio Casal / (Spain) Emilio Sánchez (first round)

== Draw ==
Key

- Q = Qualifier
- WC = Wild card
- LL = Lucky loser
- Alt = Alternate
- ITF = ITF entry
- PR = Protected ranking
- SR = Special ranking
- SE = Special exempt
- JE = Junior exempt
- JR = Junior Accelerator Programme entrant
- CO = College Accelerator Programme entrant
- NG = Next Gen Accelerator Program entrant
- w/o = Walkover
- r = Retired
- d = Defaulted

=== Finals ===
Semifinals
1	(Zimbabwe) Byron Black (United States) Jonathan Stark	6	5	6
Q	(South Africa) John-Laffnie de Jager (Zimbabwe) Kevin Ullyett	2	7	4
WC	(Australia) Darren Cahill (Australia) John Fitzgerald	6	6
2	(Canada) Grant Connell (United States) Patrick Galbraith	7	7

Final
1	(Zimbabwe) Byron Black (United States) Jonathan Stark	5	3
2	(Canada) Grant Connell (United States) Patrick Galbraith	7	6

=== Top half ===
First round
(Australia) M Kratzmann (Australia) P Rafter	6	6
(Australia) D Macpherson (Spain) J Sánchez	4	3
(United States) B Pearce (United States) D Randall	4	6	6
(Sweden) J Apell (United States) S Melville	6	3	7
(Australia) S Stolle (Australia) L Warder	1	1
7	(United States) P McEnroe (United States) R Reneberg	6	6
Q	(South Africa) J-L de Jager (Zimbabwe) K Ullyett	6	6
(United States) S Cannon (South Africa) B Talbot	4	4
(United States) M Bauer (Canada) S Lareau	4	6	7
(Mexico) J Lozano (United States) J Pugh	6	1	6
(Germany) M-K Goellner (South Africa) M Ondruska	4	6
5	(United States) L Jensen (United States) M Jensen	6	7

Second round
1	(Zimbabwe) B Black (United States) J Stark	6	7
(Australia) M Kratzmann (Australia) P Rafter	4	6
(Sweden) J Apell (United States) S Melville	6	6
7	(United States) P McEnroe (United States) R Reneberg	2	4
4	(United States) K Flach (United States) R Leach	4	6	6
Q	(South Africa) J-L de Jager (Zimbabwe) K Ullyett	6	3	7
(United States) M Bauer (Canada) S Lareau	7	4	6
5	(United States) L Jensen (United States) M Jensen	6	6	3

Quarterfinals
1	(Zimbabwe) B Black (United States) J Stark	6	7
(Sweden) J Apell (United States) S Melville	4	5
Q	(South Africa) J-L de Jager (Zimbabwe) K Ullyett	6	6	7
(United States) M Bauer (Canada) S Lareau	7	3	6

Semifinals
1	(Zimbabwe) B Black (United States) J Stark	6	5	6
Q	(South Africa) J-L de Jager (Zimbabwe) K Ullyett	2	7	4

=== Bottom half ===
First round
6	(Sweden) S Edberg (Czech Republic) P Korda	7	3	4
(South Africa) G Muller (South Africa) D Visser	6	6	6
WC	(Zimbabwe) W Black (United States) J Leach	7	4	4
WC	(Australia) D Cahill (Australia) J Fitzgerald	6	6	6
WC	(Croatia) G Ivanišević (Switzerland) M Rosset	6	6
Q	(United States) S DeVries (United States) K Kinnear	3	4
8	(Spain) S Casal (Spain) E Sánchez	3	4
(South Africa) W Ferreira (United States) J Grabb	6	6
(United States) S Davis (United States) T Martin	6	6
(United States) M Keil (United States) D Pate	3	4
(Australia) W Masur (Australia) J Stoltenberg	6	6	6
(The Bahamas) M Knowles (United States) J Palmer	7	4	4

Second round
(South Africa) G Muller (South Africa) D Visser	6	2	6
WC	(Australia) D Cahill (Australia) J Fitzgerald	3	6	7
WC	(Croatia) G Ivanišević (Switzerland) M Rosset
3	(Australia) T Woodbridge (Australia) M Woodforde	w/o
(South Africa) W Ferreira (United States) J Grabb	3	7	6
(United States) S Davis (United States) T Martin	6	5	7
(Australia) W Masur (Australia) J Stoltenberg	6	3
2	(Canada) G Connell (United States) P Galbraith	7	6

Quarterfinals
WC	(Australia) D Cahill (Australia) J Fitzgerald	3	6	7
3	(Australia) T Woodbridge (Australia) M Woodforde	6	1	6
(United States) S Davis (United States) T Martin	5	4
2	(Canada) G Connell (United States) P Galbraith	7	6

Semifinals
WC	(Australia) D Cahill (Australia) J Fitzgerald	6	6
3	(Canada) G Connell (United States) P Galbraith	7	7
