= 1994 Newsweek Champions Cup – Singles =

Singles
- 1994 Newsweek Champions Cup

Final
- Champion: (United States) Pete Sampras
- Runner-up: (Czech Republic) Petr Korda
- Score: 4–6, 6–3, 3–6, 6–3, 6–2

Details
- Draw: 56
- Seeds: 16

Events
Singles	Doubles
- Newsweek Champions Cup

Pete Sampras defeated Petr Korda in the final, 4–6, 6–3, 3–6, 6–3, 6–2 to win the men's singles tennis title at the 1994 Indian Wells Masters.

Jim Courier was the defending champion, but lost to Patrick Rafter in the second round.

== Seeds ==
The top eight seeds receive a bye into the second round.

1. (United States) Pete Sampras (champion)
2. (United States) Jim Courier (second round)
3. (Sweden) Stefan Edberg (semifinals)
4. (Spain) Sergi Bruguera (second round)
5. (Croatia) Goran Ivanišević (second round)
6. (United States) Michael Chang (third round)
7. (United States) Todd Martin (third round)
8. (Austria) Thomas Muster (quarterfinals)
9. (France) Cédric Pioline (first round)
10. (Czech Republic) Petr Korda (final)
11. (Switzerland) Marc Rosset (third round)
12. (Russia) Alexander Volkov (quarterfinals)
13. (South Africa) Wayne Ferreira (second round)
14. (France) Arnaud Boetsch (first round)
15. (United States) MaliVai Washington (third round)
16. (Spain) Carlos Costa (quarterfinals)

== Draw ==
Key

- Q = Qualifier
- WC = Wild card
- LL = Lucky loser
- Alt = Alternate
- ITF = ITF entry
- PR = Protected ranking
- SR = Special ranking
- SE = Special exempt
- JE = Junior exempt
- JR = Junior Accelerator Programme entrant
- CO = College Accelerator Programme entrant
- NG = Next Gen Accelerator Program entrant
- w/o = Walkover
- r = Retired
- d = Defaulted

=== Finals ===
Quarter-finals
1	(United States) Pete Sampras	6	6
8	(Austria) Thomas Muster	3	2
3	(Sweden) Stefan Edberg	6	6
(Australia) Darren Cahill	4	3
12	(Russia) Alexander Volkov	3	4
(United States) Aaron Krickstein	6	6
10	(Czech Republic) Petr Korda	6	3	6
16	(Spain) Carlos Costa	3	6	3

Semi-finals
1	(United States) Pete Sampras	6	3	6
3	(Sweden) Stefan Edberg	3	6	4
(United States) Aaron Krickstein	4	4
10	(Czech Republic) Petr Korda	6	6

Final
1	(United States) Pete Sampras	4	6	3	6	6
10	(Czech Republic) Petr Korda	6	3	6	3	2

=== Section 1 ===
First round
Q	(Sweden) D Engel	1	4
(Spain) E Sánchez	6	6
(Germany) M-C Goellner	4	6	6
(United States) B Gilbert	6	4	4
Q	(South Africa) D Nainkin	4	0
15	(United States) M Washington	6	6
9	(France) C Pioline	3	4
(United States) J Stark	6	6
(Czech Republic) D Rikl	1	2
(Russia) A Chesnokov	6	6
(Russia) A Cherkasov	6^{14}	0
(Peru) J Yzaga	7^{16}	6

Second round
1	(United States) P Sampras	6	6
(Spain) E Sánchez	1	1
(Germany) M-C Goellner	4	6^{4}
15	(United States) M Washington	6	7^{7}
(United States) J Stark	6	6
(Russia) A Chesnokov	3	3
(Peru) J Yzaga	6	6^{0}	3
8	(Austria) T Muster	4	7^{7}	6

Third round
1	(United States) P Sampras	7	6
15	(United States) M Washington	5	2
(United States) J Stark	4	4
8	(Austria) T Muster	6	6

Quarterfinals
1	(United States) P Sampras	6	6
8	(Austria) T Muster	3	2

=== Section 2 ===
First round
(Spain) J Sánchez	4	0
Q	(Zimbabwe) B Black	6	6
(United States) A Agassi	6	6
(United States) R Reneberg	3	3
(France) F Santoro	6	7^{7}
14	(France) A Boetsch	3	6^{3}
11	(Switzerland) M Rosset	3	6	6
(Austria) G Schaller	6	2	2
(Italy) A Gaudenzi	2	6	7^{7}
(Canada) G Rusedski	6	4	6^{1}
(France) O Delaître	1^{r}
(Australia) D Cahill	5

Second round
3	(Sweden) S Edberg	6	6
Q	(Zimbabwe) B Black	1	3
(United States) A Agassi	4	6^{3}
(France) F Santoro	6	7^{7}
11	(Switzerland) M Rosset	6	6
(Italy) A Gaudenzi	4	4
(Australia) D Cahill	6	1	7^{7}
5	(Croatia) G Ivanišević	3	6	6^{5}

Third round
3	(Sweden) S Edberg	6	6
(France) F Santoro	2	3
11	(Switzerland) M Rosset	4	7	6^{5}
(Australia) D Cahill	6	5	7^{7}

Quarterfinals
3	(Sweden) S Edberg	6	6
(Australia) D Cahill	4	3

=== Section 3 ===
First round
WC	(United States) J Leach	3	4
Q	(United States) R Weiss	6	6
(Italy) S Pescosolido	6	3	3
WC	(United States) J Grabb	0	6	6
(Sweden) N Kulti	6	1	3
12	(Russia) A Volkov	2	6	6
13	(South Africa) W Ferreira	6^{5}	6	7
(Germany) K Braasch	7^{7}	4	5
(United States) P McEnroe	7	6
Q	(Spain) JF Altur	5	2
(Germany) B Karbacher	4	0
(United States) A Krickstein	6	6

Second round
6	(United States) M Chang	6	7^{7}
Q	(United States) R Weiss	2	6^{4}
WC	(United States) J Grabb	4	4
12	(Russia) A Volkov	6	6
13	(South Africa) W Ferreira	4	7^{8}	4
(United States) P McEnroe	6	6^{6}	6
(United States) A Krickstein	6	7	6
4	(Spain) S Bruguera	7^{7}	5	4

Third round
6	(United States) M Chang	4	6	3
12	(Russia) A Volkov	6	1	6
(United States) P McEnroe	6	4	4
(United States) A Krickstein	2	6	6

Quarterfinals
12	(Russia) A Volkov	3	4
(United States) A Krickstein	6	6

=== Section 4 ===
First round
Q	(Argentina) A Mancini	6	2	4
(South Africa) M Ondruska	3	6	6
(Australia) W Masur	6	2	3
WC	(United States) S Bryan	2	6	6
(Australia) M Woodforde	5	1
10	(Czech Republic) P Korda	7	6
16	(Spain) C Costa	7^{7}	7^{7}
(Spain) A Berasategui	6^{3}	6^{3}
Q	(Austria) H Skoff	4	4
WC	(Sweden) M Wilander	6	6
(Australia) P Rafter	4	6	6
(Australia) J Stoltenberg	6	3	4

Second round
7	(United States) T Martin	6	4	6
(South Africa) M Ondruska	0	6	1
WC	(United States) S Bryan	2	6^{6}
10	(Czech Republic) P Korda	6	7^{8}
16	(Spain) C Costa	6	6
WC	(Sweden) M Wilander	4	0
(Australia) P Rafter	7^{7}	6
2	(United States) J Courier	6^{2}	2

Third round
7	(United States) T Martin	4	6	2
10	(Czech Republic) P Korda	6	3	6
16	(Spain) C Costa	4	6	7
(Australia) P Rafter	6	4	5

Quarterfinals
10	(Czech Republic) P Korda	6	3	6
16	(Spain) C Costa	3	6	3
