= 1990 Virginia Slims of Indian Wells – Doubles =

Doubles
- 1990 Newsweek Champions Cup and the Virginia Slims of Indian Wells

Final
- Champions: (Czechoslovakia) Jana Novotná (Czechoslovakia) Helena Suková
- Runners-up: (United States) Gigi Fernández (United States) Martina Navratilova
- Score: 6–2, 7–6^{(8–6)}

Details
- Draw: 28
- Seeds: 8

Events
| Singles | men | women |
| Doubles | men | women |
| ← 1989 · | Newsweek Champions Cup | · 1991 → |
| ← 1989 · | Virginia Slims of Indian Wells | · 1991 → |

Hana Mandlíková and Pam Shriver were the defending champions, but Shriver did not compete this year. Mandlíková teamed up with Larisa Savchenko-Neiland and lost in the semifinals to Jana Novotná and Helena Suková.

Novotná and Suková won the title by defeating Gigi Fernández and Martina Navratilova 6–2, 7–6^{(8–6)} in the final.

== Seeds ==
The first four seeds received a bye into the second round.

1. (Czechoslovakia) Jana Novotná / (Czechoslovakia) Helena Suková (champions)
2. (United States) Gigi Fernández / (United States) Martina Navratilova (final)
3. (Czechoslovakia) Hana Mandlíková / (Soviet Union) Larisa Savchenko-Neiland (semifinals)
4. (Canada) Jill Hetherington / (United States) Robin White (second round)
5. (Australia) Nicole Provis / (South Africa) Elna Reinach (quarterfinals)
6. (South Africa) Rosalyn Fairbank-Nideffer / (United States) Kathy Jordan (second round, withdrew)
7. (South Africa) Lise Gregory / (United States) Gretchen Magers (quarterfinals)
8. (France) Isabelle Demongeot / (West Germany) Eva Pfaff (quarterfinals)

== Draw ==
=== Key ===
- Q = Qualifier
- WC = Wild card
- LL = Lucky loser
- Alt = Alternate
- SE = Special exempt
- PR = Protected ranking
- ITF = ITF entry
- JE = Junior exempt
- w/o = Walkover
- r = Retired
- d = Defaulted
- SR = Special ranking

=== Finals ===
Semifinals
1 | (Czechoslovakia) Jana Novotná (Czechoslovakia) Helena Suková | 2 | 7 | 6
3 | (Czechoslovakia) Hana Mandlíková (Soviet Union) Larisa Savchenko-Neiland | 6 | 5 | 2
(United States) Patty Fendick (United States) Kathy Rinaldi | 0 | 7 | 4
2 | (United States) Gigi Fernández (United States) Martina Navratilova | 6 | 5 | 6

Final
1 | (Czechoslovakia) Jana Novotná (Czechoslovakia) Helena Suková | 6 | 7^{8}
2 | (United States) Gigi Fernández (United States) Martina Navratilova | 2 | 6^{6}

=== Top half ===
First round
(Japan) E Inoue (Bulgaria) K Maleeva | 6 | 6
(Argentina) G Castro (Spain) C Martínez | 2 | 3
(United States) T Phelps (United States) S Stafford | 6 | 6
(France) N Herreman (Austria) J Wiesner | 4 | 3
(United States) C Benjamin (South Africa) K Schimper | 6 | 4
8 | (France) I Demongeot (West Germany) E Pfaff | 7 | 6
(Japan) N Miyagi (United States) H Na | 6 | 6
(United States) A Gooden (Japan) A Kijimuta | 3 | 0
(United States) P Louie Harper (United States) P Barg-Mager | 6 | 6
(United States) A Leand (United Kingdom) S Loosemore | 2 | 4
(United States) S Collins (United States) J Smoller | 7 | 1 | 3
5 | (Australia) N Provis (South Africa) E Reinach | 6 | 6 | 6

Second round
1 | (Czechoslovakia) J Novotná (Czechoslovakia) H Suková | 7 | 6
(Japan) E Inoue (Bulgaria) K Maleeva | 5 | 3
(United States) T Phelps (United States) S Stafford | 3 | 6
8 | (France) I Demongeot (West Germany) E Pfaff | 6 | 7
3 | (Czechoslovakia) H Mandlíková (Soviet Union) L Savchenko-Neiland | 6 | 7
(Japan) N Miyagi (United States) H Na | 1 | 6
(United States) P Louie Harper (United States) P Barg-Mager | 4 | 4
5 | (Australia) N Provis (South Africa) E Reinach | 6 | 6

Quarterfinals
1 | (Czechoslovakia) J Novotná (Czechoslovakia) H Suková | 6 | 6
8 | (France) I Demongeot (West Germany) E Pfaff | 3 | 3
3 | (Czechoslovakia) H Mandlíková (Soviet Union) L Savchenko-Neiland | 4 | 6 | 7
5 | (Australia) N Provis (South Africa) E Reinach | 6 | 1 | 5

Semifinals
1 | (Czechoslovakia) J Novotná (Czechoslovakia) H Suková | 2 | 7 | 6
3 | (Czechoslovakia) H Mandlíková (Soviet Union) L Savchenko-Neiland | 6 | 5 | 2

=== Bottom half ===
First round
7 | (South Africa) L Gregory (United States) G Magers | 6 | 6
(United States) L Bonder-Kreiss (United States) R Casals | 1 | 1
(New Zealand) B Cordwell (United Kingdom) J Durie | 0 | 4
(Italy) L Golarsa (West Germany) C Porwik | 6 | 6
(United States) K Gompert (United States) E Rossides | 0 | 1
(United States) P Fendick (United States) K Rinaldi | 6 | 6
6 | (South Africa) R Fairbank-Nideffer (United States) K Jordan | 6 | 6
(Sweden) C Lindqvist (Australia) A Minter | 3 | 0
(United States) L Bartlett (United States) S Bartlett | 6 | 6
(South Africa) R Gaddie (South Africa) Toni Gaddie | 1 | 2
(United States) J Goodling (United States) Linley Tanner | 6 | 5 | 5
(United States) Ca MacGregor (United States) R Reis | 1 | 7 | 7

Second round
7 | (South Africa) L Gregory (United States) G Magers | 6 | 6
(Italy) L Golarsa (West Germany) C Porwik | 3 | 2
(United States) P Fendick (United States) K Rinaldi | 7 | 7
4 | (Canada) J Hetherington (United States) R White | 5 | 5
6 | (South Africa) R Fairbank-Nideffer (United States) K Jordan
(United States) L Bartlett (United States) S Bartlett | w/o
(United States) Ca MacGregor (United States) R Reis | 4 | 3
2 | (United States) G Fernández (United States) M Navratilova | 6 | 6

Quarterfinals
7 | (South Africa) L Gregory (United States) G Magers | 6 | 6 | 4
(United States) P Fendick (United States) K Rinaldi | 2 | 7 | 6
(United States) L Bartlett (United States) S Bartlett | 2 | 1
2 | (United States) G Fernández (United States) M Navratilova | 6 | 6

Semifinals
(United States) P Fendick (United States) K Rinaldi | 0 | 7 | 4
2 | (United States) G Fernández (United States) M Navratilova | 6 | 5 | 6
