= 1991 Virginia Slims of Palm Springs – Doubles =

Doubles
- 1991 Newsweek Champions Cup and the Virginia Slims of Palm Springs
- 1990 Champions: (Czechoslovakia) Jana Novotná (Czechoslovakia) Helena Suková

Final
- Champions: No champions declared

Events
Singles	men	women
Doubles	men	women
← 1990 ·	Newsweek Champions Cup	· 1992 →
← 1990 ·	Virginia Slims of Palm Springs	· 1992 →

Jana Novotná and Helena Suková were the defending champions.

The tournament was completely cancelled due to inclement weather. Only 4 first-round matches were completed.

== Seeds ==
The top four seeds received a bye to the second round.

1. (Czechoslovakia) Helena Suková / (United States) Robin White
2. (United States) Patty Fendick / (United States) Lori McNeil
3. (South Africa) Lise Gregory / (United States) Gretchen Magers
4. (Canada) Helen Kelesi / (Socialist Federal Republic of Yugoslavia) Monica Seles
5. (Canada) Jill Hetherington / (United States) Kathy Rinaldi
6. (South Africa) Rosalyn Fairbank-Nideffer / (Hungary) Andrea Temesvári
7. (United Kingdom) Jo Durie / (Australia) Michelle Jaggard
8. (Australia) Jo-Anne Faull / (New Zealand) Julie Richardson (first round)

== Draw ==
=== Key ===
- Q = Qualifier
- WC = Wild card
- LL = Lucky loser
- Alt = Alternate
- SE = Special exempt
- PR = Protected ranking
- ITF = ITF entry
- JE = Junior exempt
- w/o = Walkover
- r = Retired
- d = Defaulted
- SR = Special ranking

=== Finals ===
Semifinals

Final

=== Top half ===
First round
(United States) A Henricksson (United States) H Ludloff	3	1
(Bulgaria) K Maleeva (Bulgaria) M Maleeva	6	6
(United States) P Louie Harper (United States) A May
(France) N Herreman (Denmark) T Scheuer-Larsen
(Belgium) A Devries (France) N van Lottum
5	(Canada) J Hetherington (United States) K Rinaldi
(United States) C Benjamin (France) A Dechaume	2	4
(France) M Pierce (United States) S Rehe	6	6
(United States) Cy MacGregor (Canada) R Simpson
(Germany) K Kschwendt (Czechoslovakia) A Strnadová
(France) I Demongeot (France) N Tauziat	4	6	6
8	(Australia) J Faull (New Zealand) J Richardson	6	4	1

Second round
1	(Czechoslovakia) H Suková (United States) R White
(Bulgaria) K Maleeva (Bulgaria) M Maleeva
4	(Canada) H Kelesi (Socialist Federal Republic of Yugoslavia) M Seles
(France) M Pierce (United States) S Rehe
(France) I Demongeot (France) N Tauziat

Quarterfinals

Semifinals

=== Bottom half ===
First round
7	(United Kingdom) J Durie (Australia) M Jaggard
Q	Qualifier; Qualifier
(South Africa) L Barnard (Australia) L Field
(Netherlands) C Bakkum (United Kingdom) C Wood
Q	Qualifier; Qualifier
(France) P Paradis (France) C Suire
6	(South Africa) R Fairbank-Nideffer (Hungary) A Temesvári
(United States) N Hu (United States) M Werdel
(United States) P Barg-Mager (United States) Ca MacGregor	7^{7}	6
WC	(Hong Kong) P Hy (United States) K May-Paben	6^{2}	2
WC	(United States) P Nelson (United States) S Walsh
(Germany) E Pfaff (Australia) R Stubbs

Second round
3	(South Africa) L Gregory (United States) G Magers
(United States) P Barg-Mager (United States) Ca MacGregor
2	(United States) P Fendick (United States) L McNeil

Quarterfinals

Semifinals
