= 1991 Virginia Slims of Palm Springs – Singles =

Singles
- 1991 Newsweek Champions Cup and the Virginia Slims of Palm Springs

Final
- Champion: (United States) Martina Navratilova
- Runner-up: (Socialist Federal Republic of Yugoslavia) Monica Seles
- Score: 6–2, 7–6^{(8–6)}

Details
- Draw: 56
- Seeds: 16

Events
Singles	men	women
Doubles	men	women
← 1990 ·	Newsweek Champions Cup	· 1992 →
← 1990 ·	Virginia Slims of Palm Springs	· 1992 →

Martina Navratilova was the defending champion and successfully defended her title, defeating Monica Seles in the final, 6–2, 7–6^{(8–6)}.

== Seeds ==
The top eight seeds received a bye to the second round.

1. (Socialist Federal Republic of Yugoslavia) Monica Seles (final)
2. (United States) Martina Navratilova (champion)
3. (Bulgaria) Katerina Maleeva (quarterfinals)
4. (Czechoslovakia) Helena Suková (second round)
5. (United States) Amy Frazier (third round)
6. (Austria) Barbara Paulus (third round)
7. (France) Nathalie Tauziat (semifinals)
8. (Canada) Helen Kelesi (semifinals)
9. (Germany) Anke Huber (second round)
10. (South Africa) Rosalyn Fairbank-Nideffer (third round)
11. (Belgium) Sabine Appelmans (third round)
12. (United States) Lori McNeil (second round)
13. (Sweden) Catarina Lindqvist (third round)
14. (United States) Marianne Werdel (first round)
15. (France) Julie Halard (quarterfinals)
16. (Bulgaria) Magdalena Maleeva (first round)

== Draw ==
=== Key ===
- Q = Qualifier
- WC = Wild card
- LL = Lucky loser
- Alt = Alternate
- SE = Special exempt
- PR = Protected ranking
- ITF = ITF entry
- JE = Junior exempt
- w/o = Walkover
- r = Retired
- d = Defaulted
- SR = Special ranking

=== Finals ===
Semifinals
1	(Socialist Federal Republic of Yugoslavia) Monica Seles	6	6
8	(Canada) Helen Kelesi	0	3
7	(France) Nathalie Tauziat	3	6^{3}
2	(United States) Martina Navratilova	6	7^{7}

Final
1	(Socialist Federal Republic of Yugoslavia) Monica Seles	2	6^{6}
2	(United States) Martina Navratilova	6	7^{8}

=== Top half ===
==== Section 1 ====
First round
(United Kingdom) M Javer	6	6
Q	(United States) C Kuhlman	4	1
(United States) A Keller	2	6	6
(South Africa) E Reinach	6	0	0
(United States) L Harvey-Wild	3	4
11	(Belgium) S Appelmans	6	6
16	(Bulgaria) M Maleeva	6	5	1
(Australia) A Minter	3	7	6
(Germany) B Rittner	2	5
(Canada) P Hy	6	7
(Sweden) C Dahlman	7^{8}	5	7^{7}
(Australia) L Field	6^{6}	7	6^{5}

Second round
1	(Socialist Federal Republic of Yugoslavia) M Seles	6	6
(United Kingdom) M Javer	3	1
(United States) A Keller	2	7	3
11	(Belgium) S Appelmans	6	5	6
(Australia) A Minter	1	4
(Canada) P Hy	6	6
(Sweden) C Dahlman	3	5
5	(United States) A Frazier	6	7

Third round
1	(Socialist Federal Republic of Yugoslavia) M Seles	6	6
11	(Belgium) S Appelmans	3	0
(Canada) P Hy	4	6	6
5	(United States) A Frazier	6	4	3

Quarterfinals
1	(Socialist Federal Republic of Yugoslavia) M Seles	7	6
(Canada) P Hy	5	2

==== Section 2 ====
First round
(United States) P Fendick	6^{5}	2^{r}
(United States) P Louie-Harper	7^{7}	3^{r}
WC	(United States) P Nelson	7	6
(United States) H Na	5	4
(Japan) N Miyagi	4	2
13	(Sweden) C Lindqvist	6	6
10	(South Africa) R Fairbank-Nideffer	6	6
(France) N Herreman	2	2
(France) I Demongeot	5	6	6
WC	(United States) K Phebus	7	3	4
Q	(United Kingdom) C Wood	7^{7}	6
(France) M Pierce	6^{4}	4

Second round
4	(Czechoslovakia) H Suková	6^{4}	6	6^{7}
(United States) P Louie-Harper	7^{7}	3	7^{9}
WC	(United States) P Nelson	1	3
13	(Sweden) C Lindqvist	6	6
10	(South Africa) R Fairbank-Nideffer	6^{5}	6	6
(France) I Demongeot	7^{7}	3	1
Q	(United Kingdom) C Wood	4	4
8	(Canada) H Kelesi	6	6

Third round
(United States) P Louie-Harper	3	6	6
13	(Sweden) C Lindqvist	6	4	3
10	(South Africa) R Fairbank-Nideffer	7^{7}	3	1
8	(Canada) H Kelesi	6^{5}	6	6

Quarterfinals
(United States) P Louie-Harper	4	6	2
8	(Canada) H Kelesi	6	3	6

=== Bottom half ===
==== Section 3 ====
First round
Q	(Japan) K Date	6	6
(Germany) B Reinstadler	3	3
(Luxembourg) K Kschwendt	6	6
(Czechoslovakia) A Strnadová	4	4
(Peru) P Vásquez	6^{3}	3
12	(United States) L McNeil	7^{7}	6
14	(United States) M Werdel	5	4
(United States) S Martin	7	6
(United States) K Rinaldi	6	2	4
(Japan) T Takagi	3	6	6
Q	(United States) C Benjamin	3	4
(France) P Paradis	6	6

Second round
7	(France) N Tauziat	6	6
Q	(Japan) K Date	2	2
(Luxembourg) K Kschwendt	2	7^{7}	7^{7}
12	(United States) L McNeil	6	6^{1}	6^{3}
(United States) S Martin	6	6
(Japan) T Takagi	3	5
(France) P Paradis	1	0^{r}
3	(Bulgaria) Katerina Maleeva	6	2

Third round
7	(France) N Tauziat	6	6
(Luxembourg) K Kschwendt	3	3
(United States) S Martin	0	2
3	(Bulgaria) Katerina Maleeva	6	6

Quarterfinals
7	(France) N Tauziat	7^{8}	7^{8}
3	(Bulgaria) Katerina Maleeva	6^{6}	6^{6}

==== Section 4 ====
First round
(United States) S Rehe	4	6	6
(United Kingdom) J Durie	6	4	4
(United States) A Henricksson	5	4
(Hungary) A Temesvári	7	6
Q	(United States) J Watanabe	5	6	3
15	(France) J Halard	7	4	6
9	(Germany) A Huber	6	4	6
Q	(Canada) R Simpson-Alter	3	6	1
(France) A Dechaume	2	2
Q	(United States) G Helgeson	6	6
Q	(United States) T Whitlinger	6	5	0
(South Africa) A Coetzer	3	7	6

Second round
6	(Austria) B Paulus	6	6
(United States) S Rehe	4	3
(Hungary) A Temesvári	2	6^{5}
15	(France) J Halard	6	7^{7}
9	(Germany) A Huber	6	3	2
Q	(United States) G Helgeson	2	6	6
(South Africa) A Coetzer	2	2
2	(United States) M Navratilova	6	6

Third round
6	(Austria) B Paulus	6	2	4
15	(France) J Halard	3	6	6
Q	(United States) G Helgeson	0	2
2	(United States) M Navratilova	6	6

Quarterfinals
15	(France) J Halard	2	5
2	(United States) M Navratilova	6	7
