= 1990 Virginia Slims of Indian Wells – Singles =

Singles
- 1990 Newsweek Champions Cup and the Virginia Slims of Indian Wells

Final
- Champion: (United States) Martina Navratilova
- Runner-up: (Czechoslovakia) Helena Suková
- Score: 6–2, 5–7, 6–1

Details
- Draw: 56
- Seeds: 16

Events
Singles	men	women
Doubles	men	women
← 1989 ·	Newsweek Champions Cup	· 1991 →
← 1989 ·	Virginia Slims of Indian Wells	· 1991 →

Manuela Maleeva-Fragniere was the defending champion but did not compete that year.

Martina Navratilova won in the final 6–2, 5–7, 6–1 against Helena Suková.

== Seeds ==
A champion seed is indicated in bold text while text in italics indicates the round in which that seed was eliminated. The top eight seeds received a bye to the second round.

1. (United States) **Martina Navratilova (champion)**
2. (Spain) Conchita Martínez (third round)
3. (Czechoslovakia) Helena Suková (final)
4. (Czechoslovakia) Jana Novotná (third round)
5. (Bulgaria) Katerina Maleeva (semifinals)
6. (Australia) Hana Mandlíková (third round)
7. (Soviet Union) Larisa Neiland (second round)
8. (South Africa) Rosalyn Fairbank-Nideffer (quarterfinals)
9. (United States) Gigi Fernández (third round)
10. (United States) Gretchen Magers (third round)
11. (United States) Amy Frazier (semifinals)
12. (Austria) Judith Wiesner (third round)
13. (Sweden) Catarina Lindqvist (second round)
14. (West Germany) Claudia Porwik (third round)
15. n/a
16. (United States) Patty Fendick (first round)

== Draw ==
=== Key ===
- Q = Qualifier
- WC = Wild card
- LL = Lucky loser
- Alt = Alternate
- SE = Special exempt
- PR = Protected ranking
- ITF = ITF entry
- JE = Junior exempt
- w/o = Walkover
- r = Retired
- d = Defaulted
- SR = Special ranking

=== Finals ===
Semifinals
1	(United States) **Martina Navratilova**	**7**	**6**
5	(Bulgaria) Katerina Maleeva	6	1
3	(Czechoslovakia) **Helena Suková**	**7**	**6**
11	(United States) Amy Frazier	5	4

Final
1	(United States) **Martina Navratilova**	**6**	5	**6**
3	(Czechoslovakia) Helena Suková	2	**7**	1

=== Top half ===
==== Section 1 ====
First round
(Australia) **N Provis**	1	**6**	**6**
(West Germany) E Pfaff	**6**	3	3
(United States) **T Phelps**	**6**	**7**
(Australia) A Minter	4	6
Q	(United States) L Bonder-Kreiss	6	0
12	(Austria) **J Wiesner**	**7**	**6**
13	(Sweden) **C Lindqvist**	**7**	**6**
(United States) C Benjamin	5	3
Q	(United States) L Poruri	4	0
Q	(France) **N Herreman**	**6**	**6**
(Japan) **E Inoue**	5	**6**	**6**
(Italy) N Iaccarino	**7**	4	1

Second round
1	(United States) **M Navratilova**	**6**	**6**
(Australia) N Provis	2	0
(United States) T Phelps	0	0
12	(Austria) **J Wiesner**	**6**	**6**
13	(Sweden) C Lindqvist	2	1
Q	(France) **N Herreman**	**6**	**6**
(Japan) **E Inoue**	**6**	**6**
7	(Soviet Union) L Neiland	4	1

Third round
1	(United States) **M Navratilova**	**6**	**6**
12	(Austria) J Wiesner	3	2
Q	(France) **N Herreman**	4	**6**	**6**
(Japan) E Inoue	**6**	4	3

Quarterfinals
1	(United States) **M Navratilova**	**6**	**6**
Q	(France) N Herreman	2	1

==== Section 2 ====
First round
Q	(Japan) **Y Koizumi**	**6**	4	**6**
(United States) H Na	4	**6**	2
(New Zealand) B Cordwell	3	3
(United States) **M McGrath**	**6**	**6**
(South Africa) **A Coetzer**	**6**	**6**
16	(United States) P Fendick	3	3
9	(United States) **G Fernández**	**6**	**6**
(Czechoslovakia) J Pospíšilová	1	3
(United States) M Louie-Harper	**6**	5	1
Q	(United States) **E Rossides**	3	**7**	**6**
(United States) **K Rinaldi**	**6**	**6**
(United States) S Collins	3	0

Second round
4	(Czechoslovakia) **J Novotná**	**6**	**6**
Q	(Japan) Y Koizumi	0	0
(United States) **M McGrath**	**6**	**7**
(South Africa) A Coetzer	2	6
9	(United States) **G Fernández**	4	**6**	**6**
Q	(United States) E Rossides	**6**	3	2
(United States) K Rinaldi	1	3
5	(Bulgaria) **K Maleeva**	**6**	**6**

Third round
4	(Czechoslovakia) J Novotná	**6**	5	3
(United States) **M McGrath**	3	**7**	**6**
9	(United States) G Fernández	3	2
5	(Bulgaria) **K Maleeva**	**6**	**6**

Quarterfinals
(United States) M McGrath	1	2
5	(Bulgaria) **K Maleeva**	**6**	**6**

=== Bottom half ===
==== Section 3 ====
First round
(South Africa) K Schimper	2	3
LL	(United States) **K Gompert**	**6**	**6**
(Italy) L Golarsa	6	4
(United States) **A Keller**	**7**	**6**
(United States) K Jordan	3	**6**	0
(France) **I Demongeot**	**6**	2	**6**
10	(United States) **G Magers**	**6**	**7**
(Peru) P Vásquez	3	6
(Mexico) **A Gavaldón**	**6**	**6**
(United States) S Stafford	0	3
(United States) A Leand	2	4
(United Kingdom) **M Javer**	**6**	**6**

Second round
6	(Australia) **H Mandlíková**	**6**	**6**
LL	(United States) K Gompert	4	2
(United States) A Keller	3	2
(France) **I Demongeot**	**6**	**6**
10	(United States) **G Magers**	**6**	**6**
(Mexico) A Gavaldón	2	4
(United Kingdom) M Javer	**6**	6	0
3	(Czechoslovakia) **H Suková**	3	**7**	**6**

Third round
6	(Australia) H Mandlíková	5	**6**	3
(France) **I Demongeot**	**7**	0	**6**
10	(United States) G Magers	4	**7**	6
3	(Czechoslovakia) **H Suková**	**6**	5	**7**

Quarterfinals
(France) I Demongeot	4	3
3	(Czechoslovakia) **H Suková**	**6**	**6**

==== Section 4 ====
First round
LL	(United States) L Tanner	6	1
(Japan) **N Miyagi**	**7**	**6**
(United States) **R White**	**6**	**6**
(Japan) A Kijimuta	2	1
Q	(United States) K Shin	1	**6**	6
14	(West Germany) **C Porwik**	**6**	3	**7**
11	(United States) **A Frazier**	**7**	**6**
(South Africa) E Reinach	6	3
(France) **K Quentrec**	3	**7**	**7**
(United States) A Henricksson	**6**	5	6
(United States) **C MacGregor**	**7**	**6**
(United States) R Reis	5	1

Second round
8	(South Africa) **R Fairbank-Nideffer**	**6**	**6**
(Japan) N Miyagi	4	1
(United States) R White	**7**	5	6
14	(West Germany) **C Porwik**	5	**7**	**7**
11	(United States) **A Frazier**	3	**6**	**6**
(France) K Quentrec	**6**	1	4
(United States) C MacGregor	1	2
2	(Spain) **C Martínez**	**6**	**6**

Third round
8	(South Africa) **R Fairbank-Nideffer**	5	**6**	**6**
14	(West Germany) C Porwik	**7**	2	3
11	(United States) **A Frazier**	1	**6**	**6**
2	(Spain) C Martínez	**6**	4	2

Quarterfinals
8	(South Africa) R Fairbank-Nideffer	2	3
11	(United States) **A Frazier**	**6**	**6**
