= 1989 Virginia Slims of Indian Wells – Singles =

Singles
- 1989 Newsweek Champions Cup and the Virginia Slims of Indian Wells

Final
- Champion: (Bulgaria) Manuela Maleeva
- Runner-up: (Australia) Jenny Byrne
- Score: 6–4, 6–1

Events
| Singles | men | women |
| Doubles | men | women |
| ← 1988 · | Newsweek Champions Cup | · 1990 → |
| ← 1988 · | Virginia Slims of Indian Wells | · 1990 → |

This was the first edition of the tournament for women.

Manuela Maleeva won in the final 6–4, 6–1 against Jenny Byrne.

== Seeds ==
A champion seed is indicated in bold text while text in italics indicates the round in which that seed was eliminated. The top four seeds received a bye to the second round.

1. (United States) Chris Evert (second round)
2. (Czechoslovakia) Helena Suková (semifinals)
3. (United States) Pam Shriver (quarterfinals)
4. (Bulgaria) **Manuela Maleeva (champion)**
5. (United States) Lori McNeil (first round)
6. (Sweden) Catarina Lindqvist (quarterfinals)
7. (Australia) Nicole Provis (second round)
8. (France) Nathalie Tauziat (second round)

== Draw ==
=== Key ===
- Q = Qualifier
- WC = Wild card
- LL = Lucky loser
- Alt = Alternate
- SE = Special exempt
- PR = Protected ranking
- ITF = ITF entry
- JE = Junior exempt
- w/o = Walkover
- r = Retired
- d = Defaulted
- SR = Special ranking

=== Final ===
| Final |
| Q | (Australia) Jenny Byrne | 4 | 1 |
| 4 | (Bulgaria) **Manuela Maleeva** | **6** | **6** |

=== Section 1 ===
First round
Q | (Japan) A Kijimuta | **6** | 3 | 2
(Australia) **H Mandlíková** | 3 | **6** | **6**
(France) **I Demongeot** | **6** | **6**
(Austria) B Paulus | 3 | 1
Q | (United States) L Poruri | 1 | 3
8 | (France) **N Tauziat** | **6** | **6**
(United Kingdom) J Durie | 3 | 2
(Australia) **A Minter** | **6** | **6**
LL | (Australia) J-A Faull | 2 | 2
Q | (Australia) **J Byrne** | **6** | **6**
(United States) **T Phelps** | **6** | **6**
5 | (United States) L McNeil | 1 | 2

Second round
1 | (United States) C Evert | **6** | 6 | 0
(Australia) **H Mandlíková** | 3 | **7** | **6**
(France) **I Demongeot** | 5 | **6** | **6**
8 | (France) N Tauziat | **7** | 2 | 3
3 | (United States) **P Shriver** | **6** | **6**
(Australia) A Minter | 2 | 3
Q | (Australia) **J Byrne** | **6** | **6**
(United States) T Phelps | 2 | 2

Quarterfinals
(Australia) **H Mandlíková** | **6** | **6**
(France) I Demongeot | 3 | 3
3 | (United States) P Shriver | 2 | **6** | 2
Q | (Australia) **J Byrne** | **6** | 3 | **6**

Semifinals
(Australia) H Mandlíková | 6 | 3
Q | (Australia) **J Byrne** | **7** | **6**

=== Section 2 ===
First round
6 | (Sweden) **C Lindqvist** | **6** | **6**
(South Africa) E Reinach | 2 | 2
(South Africa) R Fairbank | **6** | 4 | 2
Q | (Japan) **A Nishiya** | 4 | **6** | **6**
(United States) **G Magers** | 4 | **7** | **6**
(Australia) D Balestrat | **6** | 5 | 2
7 | (Australia) **N Provis** | **7** | 5 | **6**
(United States) T Austin | 5 | **7** | 1
(Czechoslovakia) **J Novotná** | **7** | **7**
(Argentina) M Paz | 6 | 5
(Netherlands) **B Schultz** | 4 | **6** | **7**
(United States) R White | **6** | 4 | 5

Second round
6 | (Sweden) **C Lindqvist** | **6** | **6**
Q | (Japan) A Nishiya | 2 | 3
(United States) G Magers | **6** | 5 | 2
4 | (Bulgaria) **M Maleeva** | 2 | **7** | **6**
7 | (Australia) N Provis | **6** | 6 | 3
(Czechoslovakia) **J Novotná** | 3 | **7** | **6**
(Netherlands) B Schultz | 3 | 4
2 | (Czechoslovakia) **H Suková** | **6** | **6**

Quarterfinals
6 | (Sweden) C Lindqvist | 3 | 1
4 | (Bulgaria) **M Maleeva** | **6** | **6**
(Czechoslovakia) J Novotná | 1 | 6
2 | (Czechoslovakia) **H Suková** | **6** | **7**

Semifinals
4 | (Bulgaria) **M Maleeva** | **6** | **6**
2 | (Czechoslovakia) H Suková | 2 | 4
