= 1989 Virginia Slims of Indian Wells – Doubles =

Doubles
- 1989 Newsweek Champions Cup and the Virginia Slims of Indian Wells

Final
- Champions: (Australia) Hana Mandlíková (United States) Pam Shriver
- Runners-up: (South Africa) Rosalyn Fairbank (United States) Gretchen Magers
- Score: 6–3, 6–7, 6–3

Events
Singles	men	women
Doubles	men	women
← 1988 ·	Newsweek Champions Cup	· 1990 →
← 1988 ·	Virginia Slims of Indian Wells	· 1990 →

Hana Mandlíková and Pam Shriver won in the final 6–3, 6–7, 6–3 against Rosalyn Fairbank and Gretchen Magers.

== Seeds ==
Champion seeds are indicated in bold text while text in italics indicates the round in which those seeds were eliminated.

1. (Czechoslovakia) Jana Novotná / (Czechoslovakia) Helena Suková (semifinals)
2. (United States) Lori McNeil / (West Germany) Eva Pfaff (first round)
3. (France) Isabelle Demongeot / (France) Nathalie Tauziat (semifinals)
4. (Australia) Jenny Byrne / (United States) Robin White (first round)

== Draw ==
=== Key ===
- Q = Qualifier
- WC = Wild card
- LL = Lucky loser
- Alt = Alternate
- SE = Special exempt
- PR = Protected ranking
- ITF = ITF entry
- JE = Junior exempt
- w/o = Walkover
- r = Retired
- d = Defaulted
- SR = Special ranking

First round
1	(Czechoslovakia) **J Novotná** (Czechoslovakia) **H Suková**	**6**	6	**6**
(United States) B Herr (United States) C Reynolds	3	**7**	3
(Australia) **D Balestrat** (United States) **T Phelps**	4	**6**	**6**
(United States) H Ludloff (Sweden) M Lindström	**6**	3	4
4	(Australia) J Byrne (United States) R White	**6**	4	3
(South Africa) **R Fairbank** (United States) **G Magers**	3	**6**	**6**
(South Africa) M de Swardt (Argentina) D Garat	6	**7**	3
(United States) **R Casals** (Australia) **J-A Faull**	**7**	5	**6**
(United Kingdom) **J Durie** (United States) **S Walsh-Pete**	5	**6**	**6**
(United States) P Smith (United States) J Smoller	**7**	3	1
(Australia) N Provis (South Africa) E Reinach	2	**6**	1
3	(France) **I Demongeot** (France) **N Tauziat**	**6**	4	**6**
(Argentina) M Paz (Denmark) T Scheuer-Larsen	**7**	6	5
(Australia) **H Mandlíková** (United States) **P Shriver**	6	**7**	**7**
(United States) **Ca MacGregor** (United States) **Cy MacGregor**	**6**	2	**6**
2	(United States) L McNeil (West Germany) E Pfaff	2	**6**	3

Quarterfinals
1	(Czechoslovakia) **J Novotná** (Czechoslovakia) **H Suková**	**6**	**6**
(Australia) D Balestrat (United States) T Phelps	0	2
(South Africa) **R Fairbank** (United States) **G Magers**	4	**6**	**6**
(United States) R Casals (Australia) J-A Faull	**6**	1	4
(United Kingdom) J Durie (United States) S Walsh-Pete	3	2
3	(France) **I Demongeot** (France) **N Tauziat**	**6**	**6**
(Australia) **H Mandlíková** (United States) **P Shriver**	**6**	3	**6**
(United States) Ca MacGregor (United States) Cy MacGregor	4	**6**	3

Semifinals
1	(Czechoslovakia) J Novotná (Czechoslovakia) H Suková	6	1
(South Africa) **R Fairbank** (United States) **G Magers**	**7**	**6**
3	(France) I Demongeot (France) N Tauziat	3	5
(Australia) **H Mandlíková** (United States) **P Shriver**	**6**	**7**

Final
(South Africa) Rosalyn Fairbank (United States) Gretchen Magers	3	**7**	3
(Australia) **Hana Mandlíková** (United States) **Pam Shriver**	**6**	6	**6**
