= 1989 Newsweek Champions Cup and the Virginia Slims of Indian Wells =

1989 Newsweek Champions Cup and Virginia Slims of Indian Wells
- Date: March 13–20 (men); March 6–12 (women)
- Edition: 16th (men) / 1st (women)
- Prize money: $510,000
- Surface: Hard / outdoor
- Location: Indian Wells, California, United States
- Venue: Grand Champions Resort

Champions

Men's singles
- (Czechoslovakia) Miloslav Mečíř

Women's singles
- (Bulgaria) Manuela Maleeva

Men's doubles
- (West Germany) Boris Becker / (Switzerland) Jakob Hlasek

Women's doubles
- (Australia) Hana Mandlíková / (United States) Pam Shriver
- Newsweek Champions Cup Virginia Slims of Indian Wells

The 1989 Newsweek Champions Cup and the 1989 Virginia Slims of Indian Wells were tennis tournaments played on outdoor Hardcourts. It was the 16th edition of the Indian Wells Masters and was part of the 1989 Nabisco Grand Prix and of the Category 4 tier of the 1989 WTA Tour. Both the men's and women's events took place at the Grand Champions Resort in Indian Wells, California, in the United States. The men's tournament was played from March 13 through March 20, 1989, while the women's tournament was played from March 6 through March 12, 1989.

== Finals ==
=== Men's singles ===
(Czechoslovakia) Miloslav Mečíř defeated (France) Yannick Noah 3–6, 2–6, 6–1, 6–2, 6–3

- It was Mečíř's 2nd title of the year and the 20th of his career.

=== Women's singles ===
(Bulgaria) Manuela Maleeva defeated (Australia) Jenny Byrne 6–4, 6–1

- It was Maleeva's 1st title of the year and the 13th of her career.

=== Men's doubles ===
(West Germany) Boris Becker / (Switzerland) Jakob Hlasek defeated (United States) Kevin Curren / (United States) David Pate 7–6, 7–5

- It was Becker's 3rd title of the year and the 30th of his career. It was Hlasek's 2nd title of the year and the 8th of his career.

=== Women's doubles ===
(Australia) Hana Mandlíková / (United States) Pam Shriver defeated (South Africa) Rosalyn Fairbank / (United States) Gretchen Magers 6–3, 6–7^{(4–7)}, 6–3

- It was Mandlíková's 1st title of the year and the 29th of her career. It was Shriver's 5th title of the year and the 121st of her career.
