= Brad Pearce (tennis) =

American tennis player

- Country (sports): United States
- Residence: Provo, Utah, U.S.
- Born: March 21, 1966 (age 60) Provo, Utah, U.S.
- Height: 5 ft 9 in (1.75 m)
- Turned pro: 1986
- Retired: 1999
- Plays: Right-handed (one-handed backhand)
- Prize money: $818,413

Singles
- Career record: 41–79
- Career titles: 0
- Highest ranking: No. 71 (8 October 1990)

Grand Slam singles results
- Australian Open: 3R (1987)
- French Open: 1R (1991)
- Wimbledon: QF (1990)
- US Open: 1R (1986, 1990)

Doubles
- Career record: 168–176
- Career titles: 4
- Highest ranking: No. 24 (4 October 1993)

Grand Slam doubles results
- Australian Open: QF (1991)
- French Open: 3R (1993)
- Wimbledon: 2R (1990, 1991)
- US Open: QF (1993)

Grand Slam mixed doubles results
- Australian Open: 1R (1994)
- French Open: 2R (1989, 1993)
- Wimbledon: 2R (1989)
- US Open: 1R (1993, 1994)
- Last updated on: 24 May 2023.

Brad Pearce (born March 21, 1966) is a former tennis player from the United States, who turned professional in 1986. He won four doubles titles during his career. The right-hander reached his highest singles ATP ranking on October 8, 1990, when he became the World No. 71.

Pearce was inducted into the Intercollegiate Tennis Association (ITA) Hall of Fame.

== Career ==
=== 1987 ===
Pearce started off his new season playing doubles, reaching four finals. Three of those were on the Grand Prix tennis circuit. He won his first final in January at the Auckland, with partner Kelly Jones. En route he defeated players such as Milan Šrejber and Mark Woodforde to win the title. His year continued on a high note, making it to the quarter-finals of the Ebel U.S. Pro Indoor and the Lorraine Open and the semi-finals of the Japan Open Tennis Championships. Later he reached the finals at the OTB Open with partner Jim Pugh, losing to Gary Donnelly and Gary Muller 6–7, 2–6. A month later he made it to the final in New Haven with partner Gilad Bloom of Israel as the #1 seed, losing to the #2 seed Glenn Layendecker and Glenn Michibata 6–3, 4–6, 2–6.

=== 1990 ===
The highlight of Pearce's single career was his appearance in the quarter-finals of the Wimbledon Championship. Pearce was an unseeded player, and one of three Americans in the quarter-finals (Brad Gilbert and Kevin Curren being the others). En route he beat Ronnie Båthman (6–3, 3–6, 6–2, 6–3), Shuzo Matsuoka (7–6, 7–5, 6–3), Milan Šrejber (6–3, 6–3, 6–1), and Mark Woodforde (6–4, 6–4, 6–4) to face Ivan Lendl, the #1 seed of the tournament, where he lost (4–6, 4–6, 7–5, 4–6).

== Personal life ==
Pearce now works as an employee of Brigham Young University in the athletic department. He is the head coach of the BYU men's tennis team, and coached several players who have reached the top 800's in ATP rankings.

== ATP career finals ==
=== Doubles: 12 (4 titles / 8 runner-ups) ===
Legend Grand Slam Tournaments (0–0) ATP World Tour Finals (0–0) ATP Masters Series (0–0) ATP Championship Series (0–2) ATP World Series (4–6)	Finals by surface Hard (3–8) Clay (0–0) Grass (0–0) Carpet (1–0)	Finals by setting Outdoors (2–5) Indoors (2–3)

Result	W–L	Date	Tournament	Tier	Surface	Partner	Opponents	Score
Win	1–0	Nov 1986	Houston, United States	Grand Prix	Carpet	(Chile) Ricardo Acuña	(United States) Chip Hooper (United States) Mike Leach	6–4, 7–5
Win	2–0	Jan 1987	Auckland, New Zealand	Grand Prix	Hard	(United States) Kelly Jones	(Australia) Carl Limberger (Australia) Mark Woodforde	7–6, 7–6
Loss	2–1	Jul 1987	Schenectady, United States	Grand Prix	Hard	(United States) Jim Pugh	(United States) Gary Donnelly (South Africa) Gary Muller	6–7, 2–6
Loss	2–2	Nov 1987	Johannesburg, South Africa	Grand Prix	Hard	(United States) Eric Korita	(United States) Kevin Curren (United States) David Pate	4–6, 4–6
Loss	2–3	Jul 1989	Schenectady, United States	Grand Prix	Hard	(South Africa) Byron Talbot	(United States) Scott Davis (South Africa) Broderick Dyke	2–6, 6–7
Loss	2–4	Apr 1990	Tokyo, Japan	Championship Series	Hard	(United States) Kent Kinnear	(Australia) Mark Kratzmann (Australia) Wally Masur	6–3, 3–6, 4–6
Win	3–4	Aug 1990	Schenectady, United States	World Series	Hard	(Australia) Richard Fromberg	(United States) Brian Garrow (United States) Sven Salumaa	6–2, 3–6, 7–6
Loss	3–5	Aug 1991	Los Angeles, United States	World Series	Hard	(Canada) Glenn Michibata	(Argentina) Javier Frana (United States) Jim Pugh	5–7, 6–2, 4–6
Loss	3–6	Apr 1992	Seoul, South Korea	World Series	Hard	(Australia) Kelly Evernden	(United States) Kevin Curren (South Africa) Gary Muller	6–7, 4–6
Win	4–6	Oct 1992	Toulouse, France	World Series	Hard	(South Africa) Byron Talbot	(France) Guy Forget (France) Henri Leconte	6–1, 3–6, 6–3
Loss	4–7	Feb 1993	Philadelphia, United States	Championship Series	Hard	(South Africa) Marcos Ondruska	(United States) Jim Grabb (United States) Richey Reneberg	7–6, 3–6, 0–6
Loss	4–8	Oct 1993	Basel, Switzerland	World Series	Hard	(United States) Dave Randall	(Zimbabwe) Byron Black (United States) Jonathan Stark	6–3, 5–7, 3–6

== ATP Challenger and ITF Futures finals ==
=== Singles: 2 (0–2) ===
Legend ATP Challenger (0–2) ITF Futures (0–0)	Finals by surface Hard (0–0) Clay (0–0) Grass (0–0) Carpet (0–2)

Result	W–L	Date	Tournament	Tier	Surface	Opponent	Score
Loss	0–1	Jun 1989	Gevrey-Chambertin, France	Challenger	Carpet	(Canada) Martin Laurendeau	6–4, 1–6, 6–7
Loss	0–2	Nov 1989	Bergen, Norway	Challenger	Carpet	(Sweden) Jan Gunnarsson	3–6, 6–7

=== Doubles: 4 (1–3) ===
Legend ATP Challenger (1–3) ITF Futures (0–0)	Finals by surface Hard (1–0) Clay (0–2) Grass (0–0) Carpet (0–1)

Result	W–L	Date	Tournament	Tier	Surface	Partner	Opponents	Score
Win	1–0	Apr 1989	Guadeloupe, France	Challenger	Hard	(Israel) Gilad Bloom	(Germany) Patrick Baur (Germany) Christian Saceanu	6–4, 6–2
Loss	1–1	Jun 1989	Gevrey-Chambertin, France	Challenger	Carpet	(United States) Greg Van Emburgh	(Nigeria) Nduka Odizor (Kenya) Paul Wekesa	4–6, 2–6
Loss	1–2	Oct 1991	Pembroke Pines, United States	Challenger	Clay	(United States) Glenn Layendecker	(Argentina) Roberto Saad (Sweden) Tobias Svantesson	6–4, 3–6, 2–6
Loss	1–3	Nov 1992	Pembroke Pines, United States	Challenger	Clay	(United States) Todd Witsken	(Sweden) Rikard Bergh (United States) Trevor Kronemann	3–6, 3–6

== Performance timelines ==
Key
W	F	SF	QF	#R	RR	Q#	DNQ	A	NH

(W) winner; (F) finalist; (SF) semifinalist; (QF) quarterfinalist; (#R) rounds 4, 3, 2, 1; (RR) round-robin stage; (Q#) qualification round; (DNQ) did not qualify; (A) absent; (NH) not held; (SR) strike rate (events won / competed); (W–L) win–loss record.

=== Singles ===
Tournament	1986	1987	1988	1989	1990	1991	1992	1993	1994	SR	W–L	Win %
Grand Slam Tournaments
Australian Open	A	3R	A	A	A	1R	Q1	A	A	0 / 2	1–2	33%
French Open	A	A	A	A	A	1R	A	A	A	0 / 1	0–1	0%
Wimbledon	1R	Q1	Q1	Q2	QF	1R	Q2	Q1	A	0 / 3	4–3	57%
US Open	1R	A	A	A	1R	A	A	A	A	0 / 2	0–2	0%
Win–loss	0–2	1–1	0–0	0–0	4–2	0–3	0–0	0–0	0–0	0 / 8	5–8	38%
ATP Tour Masters 1000
Indian Wells	A	A	A	1R	2R	1R	A	A	Q3	0 / 3	1–3	25%
Miami	A	1R	A	1R	A	1R	A	A	A	0 / 3	0–3	0%
Rome	A	A	A	A	A	A	A	Q1	A	0 / 0	0–0	–
Canada	A	A	A	A	2R	1R	2R	Q1	Q1	0 / 3	2–3	40%
Cincinnati	A	A	A	2R	A	1R	Q1	A	A	0 / 2	1–2	33%
Win–loss	0–0	0–1	0–0	1–3	2–2	0–4	1–1	0–0	0–0	0 / 11	4–11	27%

=== Doubles ===
Tournament	1983	1984	1985	1986	1987	1988	1989	1990	1991	1992	1993	1994	SR	W–L	Win %
Grand Slam tournaments
Australian Open	A	A	A	A	2R	A	A	A	QF	1R	2R	2R	0 / 5	5–5	50%
French Open	A	A	A	A	A	A	1R	1R	1R	1R	3R	2R	0 / 6	3–6	33%
Wimbledon	A	A	A	1R	1R	Q2	1R	2R	2R	1R	1R	1R	0 / 8	2–8	20%
US Open	1R	A	A	1R	A	2R	2R	2R	1R	1R	QF	1R	0 / 9	6–9	40%
Win–loss	0–1	0–0	0–0	0–2	0–2	1–1	1–3	2–3	4–4	0–4	6–4	2–4	0 / 28	16–28	36%
ATP Masters Series
Indian Wells	A	A	A	A	1R	2R	A	A	QF	1R	1R	1R	0 / 6	3–6	33%
Miami	A	A	A	A	2R	A	2R	3R	3R	2R	2R	2R	0 / 7	6–7	46%
Hamburg	A	A	A	A	A	A	A	A	A	A	A	QF	0 / 1	2–1	67%
Rome	A	A	A	A	A	A	A	A	A	SF	QF	2R	0 / 3	6–3	67%
Canada	A	A	A	A	A	A	A	1R	2R	1R	QF	1R	0 / 5	3–5	38%
Cincinnati	A	A	A	A	A	A	2R	A	2R	Q1	QF	1R	0 / 4	4–4	50%
Paris	A	A	A	A	A	A	A	A	2R	A	QF	Q2	0 / 2	3–2	60%
Win–loss	0–0	0–0	0–0	0–0	1–2	1–1	2–2	2–2	6–5	4–4	8–6	3–6	0 / 28	27–28	49%
