= 2020 BNP Paribas Open =

- Date: March 11–22 (cancelled)
- Edition: 47th (Men) / 32nd (Women)
- Category: ATP Tour Masters 1000 (Men); WTA Premier Mandatory (Women)
- Draw: 96S / 32D (planned)
- Surface: Hard
- Location: Indian Wells, California, United States
- Venue: Indian Wells Tennis Garden
- Indian Wells Masters

The 2020 BNP Paribas Open (also known as the 2020 Indian Wells Masters) was a professional men and women's tennis tournament to be played in Indian Wells, California. The event was initially scheduled to take place on March 11–22, 2020, but it was canceled due to the COVID-19 pandemic.

It was to be the 47th edition of the men's event and 32nd of the women's event, and would be classified as an ATP Tour Masters 1000 event on the 2020 ATP Tour and a Premier Mandatory event on the 2020 WTA Tour. Both the men's and the women's events would be scheduled to take place at the Indian Wells Tennis Garden in Indian Wells, California on outdoor hard courts.

All top 75 ranked WTA and ATP Tour singles players were included in the initial entry list, but five-time champion Roger Federer withdrew after undergoing surgery on his right knee.

Dominic Thiem and Bianca Andreescu were the defending champions in the men's and women's singles draw, respectively prior to the cancellation, although Andreescu withdrew prior to the originally scheduled start of the tournament, citing injury.

== Impact of the COVID-19 pandemic ==
Just days before the start of the qualifying rounds, the wider spread of COVID-19 recorded a presumptive case in the state of California after declared a public health emergency in the Coachella Valley, in accordance with the Riverside County Health Department and CDC. In the planned format, the tournament would have taken place without spectators, personnel (including ball kids) must wear gloves for protective safety to avoid the risk of spreading the disease, and not to allow players holding towels or signing post-match in-person autographs via camera.

On March 8, 2020, organizers had announced the tournament would be cancelled due to the rising virus fears, becoming the first global sporting event to be cancelled. Never less, the ATP and WTA Tours were subsequently suspended on March 12 including the Miami Open, which was due to be held after the tournament. (Note: Other tennis events affected included the Nur-Sultan Challenger and Potchefstroom Open, were all in part of the ATP Challenger Tour, and several ITF tennis matches.) Other sporting events have held in the month like the National Basketball Association had to indefinitely suspend its 2019–20 season after a player tested positive for the virus, the National Collegiate Athletic Association had to schedule its men's basketball tournament cancelled just days before it would have begun, the National Hockey League suspended its season indefinitely, and Major League Soccer suspended its season just a few games have been played. Tennis players' rankings in both seasons have started to be frozen on March 16, into a further extension of suspension of both tours until resumption of tennis events in August. This event was not included in the revised tennis schedule for the latter of 2020. Tournament director and former world number 2, Tommy Haas, told the press "We are prepared to hold the tournament on another date and will explore options."

In response of the tournament's cancellation, none of the players had tested positive for the virus. The state of California itself, later restricted mass gatherings up to 500 people to later in the year until a COVID-19 vaccine is found.

This edition of Indian Wells was initially rescheduled to March 8 to 21, 2021, but was further rescheduled to October 4 to 17, and in the end, neither Thiem and Andreescu defended their titles, Cameron Norrie and Paula Badosa won the men's and women's singles titles, respectively.

== Players ==
The following players were due to compete in the tournament prior to its cancellation.

=== ATP singles main-draw entrants ===
==== Seeds ====
The following would have the seeded players. Seedings would have been based on ATP rankings as of March 9, 2020. Rank and points before were also as of March 9, 2020.

Seed	Rank	Player	Points before	Points defending	Points would have won	Points would have been
1	1	(Serbia) Novak Djokovic	10,220	45	10	10,185
2	2	(Spain) Rafael Nadal	9,850	360	10	9,500
3	3	(Austria) Dominic Thiem	7,045	1,000	10	6,055
4	5	(Russia) Daniil Medvedev	5,890	45	10	5,855
5	6	(Greece) Stefanos Tsitsipas	4,745	10	10	4,745
6	7	(Germany) Alexander Zverev	3,630	45	10	3,595
7	8	(Italy) Matteo Berrettini	2,860	10+125	10+10	2,745
8	9	(France) Gaël Monfils	2,860	180	10	2,690
9	10	(Belgium) David Goffin	2,555	10	10	2,555
10	11	(Italy) Fabio Fognini	2,400	10	10	2,400
11	12	(Spain) Roberto Bautista Agut	2,360	10	10	2,360
12	13	(Argentina) Diego Schwartzman	2,265	45	10	2,230
13	14	(Russia) Andrey Rublev	2,234	53	10	2,191
14	15	(Russia) Karen Khachanov	2,120	180	10	1,950
15	16	(Canada) Denis Shapovalov	2,075	90	10	1,995
16	17	(Switzerland) Stan Wawrinka	2,060	45	10	2,025
17	18	(Chile) Cristian Garín	1,900	0	10	1,910
18	19	(Bulgaria) Grigor Dimitrov	1,850	0	10	1,860
19	20	(Canada) Félix Auger-Aliassime	1,771	45	10	1,736
20	21	(United States) John Isner	1,760	90	10	1,680
21	22	(France) Benoît Paire	1,738	10	10	1,738
22	23	(Serbia) Dušan Lajović	1,695	25	10	1,680
23	24	(United States) Taylor Fritz	1,510	10	10	1,510
24	25	(Spain) Pablo Carreño Busta	1,500	0	10	1,510
25	26	(Australia) Alex de Minaur	1,485	10	10	1,485
26	27	(Georgia (country)) Nikoloz Basilashvili	1,395	10	10	1,395
27	28	(United Kingdom) Dan Evans	1,359	26	10	1,343
28	29	(Poland) Hubert Hurkacz	1,353	180	10	1,183
29	30	(Canada) Milos Raonic	1,350	360	10	1,000
30	32	(Serbia) Filip Krajinović	1,343	106	10	1,247
31	33	(Croatia) Borna Ćorić	1,320	10	10	1,320
32	34	(Germany) Jan-Lennard Struff	1,315	90	10	1,235

The following players would have been seeded, but withdrew from the event.

Rank	Player	Points before	Points defending	Points would have been	Reason
4	(Switzerland) Roger Federer	6,630	600	6,030	Right knee surgery
31	(Japan) Kei Nishikori	1,345	45	1,300	Right elbow injury

==== Other entrants ====
The following players received wildcards into the singles main draw:

- (United States) Marcos Giron
- (United States) Mitchell Krueger
- (United States) Brandon Nakashima
- (United States) Tennys Sandgren
- (United States) Jack Sock

The following players received entry using a protected ranking into the singles main draw:

- (Chinese Taipei) Lu Yen-hsun
- (United States) Mackenzie McDonald
- (Canada) Vasek Pospisil

The following players received entry from the qualifying draw:

- Qualifying not played following its cancellation

==== Withdrawals ====
- (South Africa) Kevin Anderson → replaced by (Argentina) Federico Delbonis
- (Ukraine) Alexandr Dolgopolov → replaced by (United States) Mackenzie McDonald
- (Switzerland) Roger Federer → replaced by (Germany) Philipp Kohlschreiber
- (Japan) Kei Nishikori → replaced by (United States) Tommy Paul
- (Argentina) Guido Pella → replaced by (Italy) Jannik Sinner
- (Spain) Albert Ramos Viñolas → replaced by (Spain) Roberto Carballés Baena
- (France) Jo-Wilfried Tsonga → replaced by (Sweden) Mikael Ymer

=== ATP doubles main-draw entrants ===
==== Seeds ====
Country	Player	Country	Player	Rank^{1}	Seed
COL	Juan Sebastián Cabal	COL	Robert Farah	3	1
POL	Łukasz Kubot	BRA	Marcelo Melo	10	2
USA	Rajeev Ram	GBR	Joe Salisbury	16	3
CRO	Ivan Dodig	SVK	Filip Polášek	18	4
ESP	Marcel Granollers	ARG	Horacio Zeballos	20	5
FRA	Pierre-Hugues Herbert	FRA	Nicolas Mahut	22	6
GER	Kevin Krawietz	GER	Andreas Mies	27	7
RSA	Raven Klaasen	AUT	Oliver Marach	35	8

- ^{1} Rankings as of March 9, 2020.

==== Other entrants ====
The following pairs received wildcards into the doubles main draw:

- Wildcards not named following its cancellation

=== WTA singles main-draw entrants ===
==== Seeds ====
The following would have the seeded players. Seedings would have been based on WTA rankings as of March 2, 2020. Rank and points before were as of March 9, 2020.

Seed	Rank	Player	Points before	Points defending	Points would have won	Points would have been
1	1	(Australia) Ashleigh Barty	8,717	120	10	8,607
2	3	(Czech Republic) Karolína Plíšková	5,205	215	10	5,000
3	4	(United States) Sofia Kenin	4,590	35	10	4,565
4	7	(Netherlands) Kiki Bertens	4,335	120	10	4,225
5	5	(Ukraine) Elina Svitolina	4,580	390	10	4,200
6	8	(Switzerland) Belinda Bencic	4,010	390	10	3,630
7	9	(United States) Serena Williams	3,915	65	10	3,860
8	10	(Japan) Naomi Osaka	3,625	120	10	3,515
9	11	(Belarus) Aryna Sabalenka	3,615	120	10	3,505
10	12	(Czech Republic) Petra Kvitová	3,566	10	10	3,566
11	13	(United States) Madison Keys	2,962	10	10	2,962
12	15	(Croatia) Petra Martić	2,770	10	10	2,770
13	16	(Spain) Garbiñe Muguruza	2,711	215	10	2,506
14	14	(United Kingdom) Johanna Konta	2,803	65	10	2,748
15	17	(Kazakhstan) Elena Rybakina	2,471	(60)^{†}	10	2,421
16	18	(Czech Republic) Markéta Vondroušová	2,307	215	10	2,102
17	19	(United States) Alison Riske	2,256	10	10	2,256
18	20	(Greece) Maria Sakkari	2,130	10	10	2,130
19	22	(Estonia) Anett Kontaveit	2,010	120	10	1,900
20	23	(Belgium) Elise Mertens	1,950	65	10	1,895
21	24	(Croatia) Donna Vekić	1,880	10	10	1,880
22	25	(Ukraine) Dayana Yastremska	1,835	10	10	1,835
23	26	(Czech Republic) Karolína Muchová	1,813	(1)^{†}	10	1,822
24	27	(Russia) Ekaterina Alexandrova	1,775	65	10	1,720
25	28	(United States) Amanda Anisimova	1,717	35	10	1,692
26	29	(China) Wang Qiang	1,706	120	10	1,596
27	30	(Russia) Anastasia Pavlyuchenkova	1,540	10	10	1,540
28	31	(Czech Republic) Barbora Strýcová	1,530	35	10	1,505
29	32	(Russia) Svetlana Kuznetsova	1,527	(1)^{†}	10	1,536
30	33	(Kazakhstan) Yulia Putintseva	1,525	35	10	1,500
31	34	(China) Zheng Saisai	1,510	10	10	1,510
32	35	(China) Zhang Shuai	1,475	35	10	1,450

† The player did not qualify for the tournament in 2019. Accordingly, points from her 16th best result are deducted instead.

The following players would have been seeded, but withdrew from the event.

Rank	Player	Points before	Points defending	Points would have been	Reason
2	(Romania) Simona Halep	6,076	120	5,956	Right foot injury
6	(Canada) Bianca Andreescu	4,555	1,000	3,555	Left knee injury
21	(Germany) Angelique Kerber	2,040	650	1,390	Left leg injury

==== Other entrants ====
The following players received wildcards into the singles main draw:

- (United States) Kristie Ahn
- (United States) Usue Maitane Arconada
- (United States) Madison Brengle
- (Belgium) Kim Clijsters
- (Canada) Leylah Annie Fernandez
- (United States) Christina McHale
- (United States) Caty McNally
- Last remaining wildcard slot not used following its cancellation

The following players received entry using a protected ranking into the singles main draw:

- (United States) Shelby Rogers
- (Kazakhstan) Yaroslava Shvedova

The following players received entry from the qualifying draw:

- Qualifying not played following its cancellation

==== Withdrawals ====
Before the tournament

- (Canada) Bianca Andreescu → replaced by (United States) Shelby Rogers
- (Belarus) Victoria Azarenka → replaced by (Japan) Misaki Doi
- (United States) Danielle Collins → replaced by (Tunisia) Ons Jabeur
- (Romania) Simona Halep → replaced by (United States) Taylor Townsend
- (Germany) Angelique Kerber → replaced by (Belgium) Kirsten Flipkens

=== WTA doubles main-draw entrants ===
==== Seeds ====
Country	Player	Country	Player	Rank^{1}	Seed
TPE	Hsieh Su-wei	CZE	Barbora Strýcová	3	1
HUN	Tímea Babos	FRA	Kristina Mladenovic	7	2
BEL	Elise Mertens	BLR	Aryna Sabalenka	11	3
CZE	Barbora Krejčíková	CZE	Kateřina Siniaková	17	4
CAN	Gabriela Dabrowski	LAT	Jeļena Ostapenko	24	5
TPE	Chan Hao-ching	TPE	Latisha Chan	28	6
USA	Nicole Melichar	CHN	Xu Yifan	29	7
CZE	Květa Peschke	NED	Demi Schuurs	35	8

- ^{1} Rankings as of March 2, 2020.

==== Other entrants ====
The following pairs received wildcards into the doubles main draw:

- (Belgium) Kim Clijsters / (United States) Sloane Stephens
- Remaining wildcard slots not used following its cancellation
