= 1992 Newsweek Champions Cup – Doubles =

Doubles
- 1992 Newsweek Champions Cup

Final
- Champions: (United States) Steve DeVries (Australia) David MacPherson
- Runners-up: (United States) Kent Kinnear (United States) Sven Salumaa
- Score: 4–6, 6–3, 6–3

Details
- Draw: 28
- Seeds: 8

Events
Singles	Doubles
- Newsweek Champions Cup

Jim Courier and Javier Sánchez were the defending champions, but lost in the second round this year.

Steve DeVries and David Macpherson won the title, defeating Kent Kinnear and Sven Salumaa 4–6, 6–3, 6–3 in the final.

== Seeds ==
1. (Australia) Todd Woodbridge / (Australia) Mark Woodforde (quarterfinals)
2. (United States) Ken Flach / (United States) Robert Seguso (second round)
3. (Canada) Grant Connell / (Canada) Glenn Michibata (quarterfinals)
4. (United States) Scott Davis / (United States) David Pate (second round)
5. (United States) Kelly Jones / (United States) Rick Leach (first round)
6. (United States) Patrick Galbraith / (United States) Todd Witsken (second round)
7. (Netherlands) Tom Nijssen / (Czechoslovakia) Cyril Suk (first round)
8. (United States) Luke Jensen / (Australia) Laurie Warder (first round)

== Draw ==
Key

- Q = Qualifier
- WC = Wild card
- LL = Lucky loser
- Alt = Alternate
- ITF = ITF entry
- PR = Protected ranking
- SR = Special ranking
- SE = Special exempt
- JE = Junior exempt
- JR = Junior Accelerator Programme entrant
- CO = College Accelerator Programme entrant
- NG = Next Gen Accelerator Program entrant
- w/o = Walkover
- r = Retired
- d = Defaulted

=== Finals ===
Semifinals
(United States) Jim Pugh (Australia) Jason Stoltenberg	4	1
(United States) Kent Kinnear (United States) Sven Salumaa	6	6
(United States) Steve DeVries (Australia) David Macpherson	7	6
(United States) Richey Reneberg (United States) David Wheaton	5	3

Final
(United States) Kent Kinnear (United States) Sven Salumaa	6	3	3
(United States) Steve DeVries (Australia) David Macpherson	4	6	6

=== Top half ===
First round
(Argentina) J Frana (Mexico) L Lavalle	6	4
WC	(France) O Delaître (France) G Forget	7	6
(Czechoslovakia) P Korda (Netherlands) R Krajicek	2	4
(United States) J Pugh (Australia) J Stoltenberg	6	6
WC	(United States) J Leach (United States) B MacPhie	6	6	6
8	(United States) L Jensen (Australia) L Warder	3	7	3
(Switzerland) J Hlasek (Croatia) G Ivanišević	2	6
(Spain) S Casal (Spain) E Sánchez	6	7
(United States) K Kinnear (United States) S Salumaa	4	6	6
WC	(United States) J Palmer (United States) J Stark	6	3	3
(Australia) M Kratzmann (Australia) W Masur	6	2	1
6	(United States) P Galbraith (United States) T Witsken	2	6	6

Second round
1	(Australia) T Woodbridge (Australia) M Woodforde	6	6
WC	(France) O Delaître (France) G Forget	4	3
(United States) J Pugh (Australia) J Stoltenberg	6	6
WC	(United States) J Leach (United States) B MacPhie	3	4
3	(Canada) G Connell (Canada) G Michibata	6	6
(Spain) S Casal (Spain) E Sánchez	3	4
(United States) K Kinnear (United States) S Salumaa	3	6	6
6	(United States) P Galbraith (United States) T Witsken	6	3	4

Quarterfinals
1	(Australia) T Woodbridge (Australia) M Woodforde	2	6
(United States) J Pugh (Australia) J Stoltenberg	6	7
3	(Canada) G Connell (Canada) G Michibata	4	4
(United States) K Kinnear (United States) S Salumaa	6	6

Semifinals
(United States) J Pugh (Australia) J Stoltenberg	4	1
(United States) K Kinnear (United States) S Salumaa	6	6

=== Bottom half ===
First round
5	(United States) K Jones (United States) R Leach	1	6
(South Africa) W Ferreira (South Africa) P Norval	6	7
(Sweden) R Båthman (Sweden) R Bergh	7	4	6
WC	(South Africa) P Aldrich (South Africa) D Visser	6	6	2
(United States) S DeVries (Australia) D Macpherson	6	6
Q	(Australia) N Borwick (Australia) S Youl	4	3
7	(Netherlands) T Nijssen (Czechoslovakia) C Suk	6	3
(United States) R Reneberg (United States) D Wheaton	7	6
Q	(United States) G Layendecker (South Africa) B Talbot	1	5
(United States) J Courier (Spain) J Sánchez	6	7
(United States) P Annacone (United States) B Pearce	6	4	2
(United States) K Curren (South Africa) G Muller	4	6	6

Second round
(South Africa) W Ferreira (South Africa) P Norval	6	6	7
(Sweden) R Båthman (Sweden) R Bergh	7	4	6
(United States) S DeVries (Australia) D Macpherson	6	2	6
4	(United States) S Davis (United States) D Pate	4	6	4
(United States) R Reneberg (United States) D Wheaton	6	6
(United States) J Courier (Spain) J Sánchez	4	4
(United States) K Curren (South Africa) G Muller	6	4	6
2	(United States) K Flach (United States) R Seguso	3	6	4

Quarterfinals
(South Africa) W Ferreira (South Africa) P Norval	3	6	4
(United States) S DeVries (Australia) D Macpherson	6	2	6
(United States) R Reneberg (United States) D Wheaton	7	7
(United States) K Curren (South Africa) G Muller	6	6

Semifinals
(United States) S DeVries (Australia) D Macpherson	7	6
(United States) R Reneberg (United States) D Wheaton	5	3
