= 1990 Newsweek Champions Cup and the Virginia Slims of Indian Wells =

1990 Newsweek Champions Cup and Virginia Slims of Indian Wells
- Date: March 6–20
- Edition: 17th
- Prize money: $750,000
- Surface: Hard / outdoor
- Location: Indian Wells, California, US

Champions

Men's singles
- (Sweden) Stefan Edberg

Women's singles
- (United States) Martina Navratilova

Men's doubles
- (Germany) Boris Becker / (France) Guy Forget

Women's doubles
- (Czechoslovakia) Jana Novotná / (Czechoslovakia) Helena Suková
- Newsweek Champions Cup Virginia Slims of Indian Wells

The 1990 Newsweek Champions Cup and the Virginia Slims of Indian Wells Cup were tennis tournaments played on outdoor hard courts. It was the 17th edition of the tournament, and was part of the ATP Championship Series, Single Week category of the 1990 ATP Tour, and of the Tier II Series of the 1990 WTA Tour. It was held from March 6 to March 20, 1990.

The men's singles draw was headlined by Boris Becker and Stefan Edberg. Other top seeds were Brad Gilbert, Aaron Krickstein, and Andre Agassi.

The women's singles draw featured Martina Navratilova and Conchita Martínez. Other top seeds present were Helena Suková, Jana Novotná, and Katerina Maleeva.

== Finals ==
=== Men's singles ===
(Sweden) Stefan Edberg defeated (United States) Andre Agassi, 6–4, 5–7, 7–6, 7–6

- It was Stefan Edberg's 1st title of the year and his 22nd overall. It was his 1st Masters title.

=== Women's singles ===
(United States) Martina Navratilova defeated (Czechoslovakia) Helena Suková, 6–2, 5–7, 6–1,

- It was Martina Navratilova's 3rd title of the year and the 149th of her career.

=== Men's doubles ===
(Germany) Boris Becker / (France) Guy Forget defeated (United States) Jim Grabb / (United States) Patrick McEnroe, 4–6, 6–4, 6–3

=== Women's doubles ===
(Czechoslovakia) Jana Novotná / (Czechoslovakia) Helena Suková defeated (United States) Gigi Fernández / (United States) Martina Navratilova, 6–2, 7–6^{(8–6)}
