= 1991 Newsweek Champions Cup – Doubles =

Doubles
- 1991 Newsweek Champions Cup

Final
- Champions: (United States) Jim Courier (Spain) Javier Sánchez
- Runners-up: (France) Guy Forget (France) Henri Leconte
- Score: 7–6, 3–6, 6–3

Events
Singles	Doubles
← 1990 ·	Newsweek Champions Cup	· 1992 →

Boris Becker and Guy Forget were the defending champions, but Becker did not participate this year. Forget partnered Henri Leconte.

Jim Courier and Javier Sánchez won the title, defeating Forget and Leconte 7–6, 3–6, 6–3 in the final.

== Seeds ==
1. (United States) Scott Davis / (United States) David Pate (quarterfinals)
2. (Spain) Sergio Casal / (Spain) Emilio Sánchez (second round)
3. (United States) Rick Leach / (United States) Jim Pugh (second round)
4. (Australia) Darren Cahill / (Australia) Mark Kratzmann (second round)
5. (Germany) Udo Riglewski / (Germany) Michael Stich (quarterfinals)
6. (South Africa) Pieter Aldrich / (South Africa) Danie Visser (first round)
7. (Canada) Grant Connell / (Canada) Glenn Michibata (second round)
8. (United States) Jim Grabb / (South Africa) Gary Muller (semifinals)

== Draw ==
=== Key ===
- Q = Qualifier
- WC = Wild card
- LL = Lucky loser
- Alt = Alternate
- ITF = ITF entry
- PR = Protected ranking
- SR = Special ranking
- SE = Special exempt
- JE = Junior exempt
- JR = Junior Accelerator Programme entrant
- CO = College Accelerator Programme entrant
- NG = Next Gen Accelerator Program entrant
- w/o = Walkover
- r = Retired
- d = Defaulted

=== Finals ===
Semifinals
(United States) Jim Courier (Spain) Javier Sánchez	6	4	6
(Australia) John Fitzgerald (United States) Kelly Jones	4	6	3
WC	(France) Guy Forget (France) Henri Leconte	6	6
8	(United States) Jim Grabb (South Africa) Gary Muller	3	3

Final
(United States) Jim Courier (Spain) Javier Sánchez	7	3	6
WC	(France) Guy Forget (France) Henri Leconte	6	6	3

=== Top half ===
First round
(South Africa) S Kruger (United States) D Wheaton	7	6
(Spain) S Bruguera (Spain) T Carbonell	5	3
WC	(Sweden) D Ekerot (United States) D Isaak	1	6
(United States) J Courier (Spain) J Sánchez	6	7
(United Kingdom) N Broad (United States) K Curren	3	4
7	(Canada) G Connell (Canada) G Michibata	6	6
(Australia) J Fitzgerald (United States) K Jones	6	6
Q	(Argentina) H de la Peña (Brazil) L Mattar	2	4
(United States) J Brown (United States) S Melville	6	4	1
WC	(United States) K Flach (United States) R Seguso	4	6	6
(United States) L Jensen (Mexico) J Lozano	4	5
5	(Germany) U Riglewski (Germany) M Stich	6	7

Second round
1	(United States) S Davis (United States) D Pate	4	6	7
(South Africa) S Kruger (United States) D Wheaton	6	3	6
(United States) J Courier (Spain) J Sánchez	7	6
7	(Canada) G Connell (Canada) G Michibata	6	3
4	(Australia) D Cahill (Australia) M Kratzmann	4	1
(Australia) J Fitzgerald (United States) K Jones	6	6
WC	(United States) K Flach (United States) R Seguso	4	6	6
5	(Germany) U Riglewski (Germany) M Stich	6	3	7

Quarterfinals
1	(United States) S Davis (United States) D Pate	7	3	2
(United States) J Courier (Spain) J Sánchez	6	6	6
(Australia) J Fitzgerald (United States) K Jones	6	7
5	(Germany) U Riglewski (Germany) M Stich	1	6

Semifinals
(United States) J Courier (Spain) J Sánchez	6	4	6
(Australia) J Fitzgerald (United States) K Jones	4	6	3

=== Bottom half ===
First round
6	(South Africa) P Aldrich (South Africa) D Visser	6	3
(United States) K Kinnear (United States) S Salumaa	7	6
(Ecuador) A Gómez (Brazil) C Motta	2	2
(United States) B Garrow (United States) B Pearce	6	6
WC	(France) G Forget (France) H Leconte	6	7	6
(South Africa) W Ferreira (Australia) L Warder	7	5	3
8	(United States) J Grabb (South Africa) G Muller	4	7	6
Q	(Italy) D Nargiso (South Africa) P Norval	6	6	3
(Australia) W Masur (Australia) J Stoltenberg	6	6	5
(Australia) B Dyke (Sweden) P Lundgren	7	2	7
(United States) P Galbraith (United States) T Witsken	6	4	7
(Socialist Federal Republic of Yugoslavia) G Ivanišević (Czechoslovakia) P Korda	2	6	5

Second round
(United States) K Kinnear (United States) S Salumaa	7	6	5
(United States) B Garrow (United States) B Pearce	6	7	7
WC	(France) G Forget (France) H Leconte	1	7	6
3	(United States) R Leach (United States) J Pugh	6	6	1
8	(United States) J Grabb (South Africa) G Muller	7	7
(Australia) B Dyke (Sweden) P Lundgren	5	6
(United States) P Galbraith (United States) T Witsken	6	6	6
2	(Spain) S Casal (Spain) E Sánchez	7	3	4

Quarterfinals
(United States) B Garrow (United States) B Pearce	6	1
WC	(France) G Forget (France) H Leconte	7	6
8	(United States) J Grabb (South Africa) G Muller	6	7
(United States) P Galbraith (United States) T Witsken	0	5

Semifinals
WC	(France) G Forget (France) H Leconte	6	6
8	(United States) J Grabb (South Africa) G Muller	3	3
