= 1989 Newsweek Champions Cup – Doubles =

Doubles
- 1989 Newsweek Champions Cup

Final
- Champions: (West Germany) Boris Becker (Switzerland) Jakob Hlasek
- Runners-up: (United States) Kevin Curren (United States) David Pate
- Score: 7–6, 7–5

Events
Singles	Doubles
← 1988 ·	Newsweek Champions Cup	· 1990 →

Boris Becker and Guy Forget were the defending champions but only Becker competed that year with Jakob Hlasek.

Becker and Hlasek won in the final 7–6, 7–5 against Kevin Curren and David Pate.

== Seeds ==
The top four seeded teams received byes into the second round.

1. (Spain) Sergio Casal / (Spain) Emilio Sánchez (second round)
2. (United States) Ken Flach / (United States) Robert Seguso (quarterfinals)
3. (Mexico) Jorge Lozano / (United States) Todd Witsken (second round)
4. (United States) Paul Annacone / (South Africa) Christo van Rensburg (quarterfinals)
5. (United States) Kevin Curren / (United States) David Pate (final)
6. (South Africa) Pieter Aldrich / (South Africa) Danie Visser (semifinals)
7. (Sweden) Anders Järryd / (Denmark) Michael Mortensen (second round)
8. (United States) Scott Davis / (United States) Tim Wilkison (first round)

== Draw ==
=== Key ===
- Q = Qualifier
- WC = Wild card
- LL = Lucky loser
- Alt = Alternate
- SE = Special exempt
- PR = Protected ranking
- ITF = ITF entry
- JE = Junior exempt
- w/o = Walkover
- r = Retired
- d = Defaulted
- SR = Special ranking

=== Finals ===
Semifinals
(West Germany) Boris Becker (Switzerland) Jakob Hlasek	7	7
6	(South Africa) Pieter Aldrich (South Africa) Danie Visser	6	5
5	(United States) Kevin Curren (United States) David Pate	7	3	6
(Sweden) Stefan Edberg (United States) Jim Grabb	5	6	1

Final
(West Germany) Boris Becker (Switzerland) Jakob Hlasek	7	7
5	(United States) Kevin Curren (United States) David Pate	6	5

=== Top half ===
First round
(Sweden) J Gunnarsson (Australia) M Woodforde	6	6	6
(Mexico) L Lavalle (Spain) J Sánchez	7	4	4
(West Germany) B Becker (Switzerland) J Hlasek	6	6
(United States) S Giammalva Jr. (United States) R Van't Hof	4	3
(Sweden) P Lundgren (Netherlands) T Nijssen	4	4
7	(Sweden) A Järryd (Denmark) M Mortensen	6	6
(Ecuador) A Gómez (Brazil) C Motta	6	3
(Socialist Federal Republic of Yugoslavia) G Ivanišević (Socialist Federal Republic of Yugoslavia) S Živojinović	7	6
(South Africa) E Edwards (United States) G Holmes	4	5
(Canada) G Connell (Canada) G Michibata	6	7
(United States) E Korita (United States) J Levine	1	2
6	(South Africa) P Aldrich (South Africa) D Visser	6	6

Second round
1	(Spain) S Casal (Spain) E Sánchez	2	6	3
(Sweden) J Gunnarsson (Australia) M Woodforde	6	3	6
(West Germany) B Becker (Switzerland) J Hlasek	6	6
7	(Sweden) A Järryd (Denmark) M Mortensen	1	3
3	(Mexico) J Lozano (United States) T Witsken	6	3
(Socialist Federal Republic of Yugoslavia) G Ivanišević (Socialist Federal Republic of Yugoslavia) S Živojinović	7	6
(Canada) G Connell (Canada) G Michibata	7	4	4
6	(South Africa) P Aldrich (South Africa) D Visser	6	6	6

Quarterfinals
(Sweden) J Gunnarsson (Australia) M Woodforde	2	6	1
(West Germany) B Becker (Switzerland) J Hlasek	6	3	6
(Socialist Federal Republic of Yugoslavia) G Ivanišević (Socialist Federal Republic of Yugoslavia) S Živojinović	3	0^{r}
6	(South Africa) P Aldrich (South Africa) D Visser	6	1

Semifinals
(West Germany) B Becker (Switzerland) J Hlasek	7	7
6	(South Africa) P Aldrich (South Africa) D Visser	6	5

=== Bottom half ===
First round
5	(United States) K Curren (United States) D Pate	5	6	7
(Australia) D Cahill (Australia) M Kratzmann	7	3	6
(United States) M Chang (Venezuela) N Pereira	1	6	6
(United States) D Eisenman (United States) M Lucena	6	1	3
(United States) D Goldie (United States) T Pawsat	7	2	6
(Israel) A Mansdorf (Czechoslovakia) M Mečíř	5	6	4
8	(United States) S Davis (United States) T Wilkison	7	2	4
(Australia) P Doohan (Australia) L Warder	6	6	6
(United States) M Davis (Australia) B Drewett	4	3
(Sweden) S Edberg (United States) J Grabb	6	6
(United States) M Anger (South Africa) G Muller	7	4	4
(United States) J Kriek (Australia) W Masur	6	6	6

Second round
5	(United States) K Curren (United States) D Pate	6	6
(United States) M Chang (Venezuela) N Pereira	3	3
(United States) D Goldie (United States) T Pawsat	7	6	1
4	(United States) P Annacone (South Africa) C van Rensburg	6	7	6
(Australia) P Doohan (Australia) L Warder	6	4
(Sweden) S Edberg (United States) J Grabb	7	6
(United States) J Kriek (Australia) W Masur	6	3
2	(United States) K Flach (United States) R Seguso	7	6

Quarterfinals
5	(United States) K Curren (United States) D Pate	3	6	6
4	(United States) P Annacone (South Africa) C van Rensburg	6	3	4
(Sweden) S Edberg (United States) J Grabb	DEF
2	(United States) K Flach (United States) R Seguso

Semifinals
5	(United States) K Curren (United States) D Pate	7	3	6
(Sweden) S Edberg (United States) J Grabb	5	6	1
