= Indian Wells Open =

Annual tennis tournament held in California

Coordinates: 33°43′26″N 116°18′21″W

Indian Wells Open BNP Paribas Open

Tournament information
- Founded: 1974; 52 years ago
- Location: Tucson, Arizona (1974–75); Rancho Mirage, California (1976–80); La Quinta, California (1981–86); Indian Wells, California (1987–current)
- Venue: Indian Wells Tennis Garden
- Surface: Hard (Laykold) – outdoors
- Website: bnpparibasopen.com

Current champions (2026)
- Men's singles: (Italy) Jannik Sinner
- Women's singles: Aryna Sabalenka
- Men's doubles: (Argentina) Guido Andreozzi; (France) Manuel Guinard
- Women's doubles: (Czech Republic) Kateřina Siniaková; (United States) Taylor Townsend
ATP Tour
- Category: ATP Masters 1000 (since 1990); Grand Prix tennis circuit (1977–89)
- Draw: 96S / 48Q / 32D
- Prize money: US$9,415,725 (2026)
WTA Tour
- Category: WTA 1000 (since 2021); WTA Premier Mandatory (2009–19); WTA Tier I (1996–2008); WTA Tier II (1990–95); WTA Tier III (1989)
- Draw: 96S / 48Q / 32D
- Prize money: US$ 9,415,725 (2026)

The Indian Wells Open, known as the BNP Paribas Open for sponsorship reasons, is an annual professional tennis tournament held in Indian Wells, California, United States. It is played on outdoor hardcourts at the Indian Wells Tennis Garden, and is held in March. The tournament is part of the ATP 1000 events on the ATP Tour and part of the WTA 1000 events on the WTA Tour.

The tournament is the best-attended tennis tournament outside the four Grand Slam tournaments (493,440 in total attendance during the 2024 event); it is sometimes called the "fifth Grand Slam" in reference to this. The Indian Wells Tennis Garden has the second-largest permanent tennis stadium in the world, behind the US Open's Arthur Ashe Stadium in New York. The Indian Wells Open is the premier tennis tournament in the Western United States and the second largest tennis tournament throughout the United States and the Americas (behind the US Open in the Eastern United States).

Winning the Indian Wells Open and Miami Open in the same season is called the "Sunshine Double" — since they are a series of two elite, consecutive hard-court tournaments in the United States and are held in Florida (the Sunshine State) and the sunny desert community of Indian Wells.

Between 1974 and 1976, it was a non-tour event and between 1977 and 1989 it was held as part of the Grand Prix Tennis Tour. Both singles main draws include 96 players in a 128-player grid, with the 32 seeded players getting a bye (a free pass) to the second round.

Since 2024, mixed doubles has been introduced as a new category.

== Location ==
Indian Wells lies in the Coachella Valley (Palm Springs area), about 125 miles (201 km) east of downtown Los Angeles.

The tournament is played in the Indian Wells Tennis Garden (built in 2000) which has 29 tennis courts, including the 16,100-seat main stadium, which is the second largest tennis-specific stadium in the world. After the 2013 BNP Paribas Open, the Indian Wells Tennis Garden started an expansion and upgrade of its facilities that includes a new 8,000 seat Stadium 2. The revamping of the tennis center also included a "Pro Purple" interior court color created specifically for the ATP 1000 events and first used at Indian Wells, citing the purple color being 180 degrees and exactly opposite the yellow of the ball.

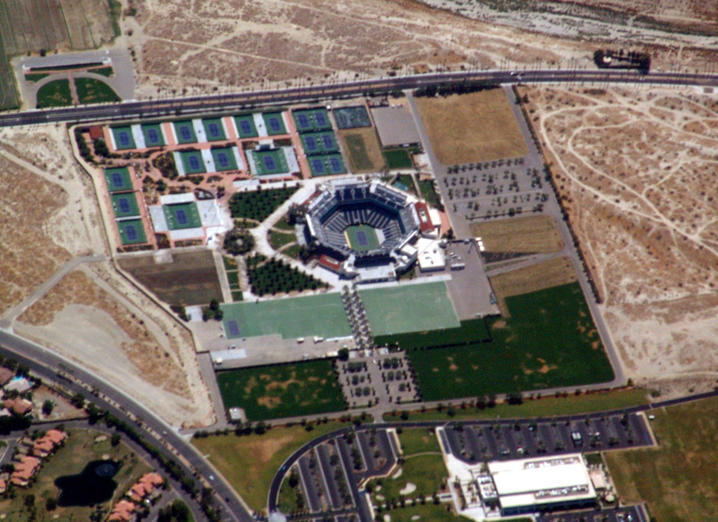
Indian Wells Tennis Garden in 2005

== History ==
The tournament was founded by former tennis pros Charlie Pasarell and Raymond Moore. It has been known by a number of names, and accepted numerous corporate sponsorships, throughout its existence. The French multinational banking group BNP Paribas has held the naming rights since 2009.

Originally the women's tournament was held a week before the men's event. In 1996, the championship became one of the few fully combined events on both the Association of Tennis Professionals and Women's Tennis Association tours.

The Indian Wells Open has become one of the largest events on both the men's and women's tours. In 2004, the tournament expanded to a multi-week 96-player field. Winning the Indian Wells Open and the Miami Open back to back has been colloquially termed the Sunshine Double. Dubbed the "Grand Slam of the West", it is the most-attended tennis tournament in the world other than the four Majors, with over 450,000 visitors during the 2015 event.

In 2009, the tournament and the Indian Wells Tennis Garden were sold to Larry Ellison.

On March 8, 2020, the tournament was postponed, and later canceled, to halt the potential spread of COVID-19.

A new category, mixed doubles, was introduced in 2024, with Storm Hunter and Matthew Ebden claiming the title in its very first edition.

== Williams sisters boycott ==
Venus and Serena Williams refused to play the Indian Wells tournament from 2001 to 2014 despite threats of financial sanctions and ranking point penalties. The two were scheduled to play in the 2001 semifinal but Venus withdrew due to an injury. Amid speculation of match fixing, the crowd for the final loudly booed Serena when she came out to play the final and continued to boo her intermittently through the entire match, even to the point of cheering unforced errors and double faults. Williams won the tournament and was subsequently booed during the awards ceremony. Nine days later, while attending the Ericsson Open, Richard Williams, Serena and Venus's father, stated racial slurs were directed at him while in the stands at Indian Wells. He said that while he and Venus were taking their seats for the final, multiple fans used the racial slur and one spoke of skinning him alive. When asked about her father's allegations, Venus said "I heard what he heard." Indian Wells tournament director Charlie Pasarell said he was humiliated by the crowd's reaction, adding, "I was cringing when all that stuff was going on. It was unfair for the crowd to do that."

After a phone call from Larry Ellison (the multi-billionaire founder of Oracle, tennis enthusiast and most recent owner of the tournament), Serena Williams returned to Indian Wells in 2015, ending her 14-year boycott of the event. Venus Williams ended her boycott by competing in Indian Wells the next year.

== Eisenhower Cup ==
The Eisenhower Cup is an exhibition mixed doubles tournament played the day before the start of the main draw. Teams consist of one ATP player partnered with one WTA player. Matches are played in the style of a 10pt tiebreaker, also known as Tie Break Tens. There have been 4 winning teams since the start of the mixed doubles format for the competition: Taylor Fritz/Aryna Sabalenka, Ben Shelton/Emma Navarro won once whereas Taylor Fritz/Elena Rybakina are two times champions. The 2026 prize money was $200,000, split between the two winners. The event had previously been played as a men's singles event in 2019, where Milos Raonic defeated Stan Wawrinka, and as a women's singles event in 2022 where Amanda Anisimova defeated Maria Sakkari. Other past participants include Daniil Medvedev, Stefanos Tsitsipas, Iga Świątek, and Jessica Pegula.

== Past finals ==
=== Men's singles ===
Year	Champions	Runners-up	Score
1974	(Australia) John Newcombe	(United States) Arthur Ashe	6–3, 7–6
1975	(Australia) John Alexander	(Romania) Ilie Năstase	7–5, 6–2
1976	(United States) Jimmy Connors	(United States) Roscoe Tanner	6–4, 6–4
↓ Grand Prix circuit ↓
1977	(United States) Brian Gottfried	(Argentina) Guillermo Vilas	2–6, 6–1, 6–3
1978	(United States) Roscoe Tanner	(Mexico) Raúl Ramírez	6–1, 7–6^{(7–5)}
1979	(United States) Roscoe Tanner (2)	(United States) Brian Gottfried	6–4, 6–2
1980	Final not held due to rain (tournament cancelled at the semifinal stage)		
1981	(United States) Jimmy Connors (2)	(Czechoslovakia) Ivan Lendl	6–3, 7–6^{(7–5)}
1982	(France) Yannick Noah	(Czechoslovakia) Ivan Lendl	3–6, 6–2, 7–5
1983	(Spain) José Higueras	(United States) Eliot Teltscher	6–4, 6–2
1984	(United States) Jimmy Connors (3)	(France) Yannick Noah	6–2, 6–7^{(7–9)}, 6–3
1985	(United States) Larry Stefanki	(United States) David Pate	6–1, 6–4, 3–6, 6–3
1986	(Sweden) Joakim Nyström	(France) Yannick Noah	6–1, 6–3, 6–2
1987	(West Germany) Boris Becker	(Sweden) Stefan Edberg	6–4, 6–4, 7–5
1988	(West Germany) Boris Becker (2)	(Spain) Emilio Sánchez	7–5, 6–4, 2–6, 6–4
1989	(Czechoslovakia) Miloslav Mečíř	(France) Yannick Noah	3–6, 2–6, 6–1, 6–2, 6–3
↓ ATP 1000 tournament (Note: Known as Championship Series, Single Week from 1990 till 1995, Super 9 from 1996 till 1999 and Masters Series from 2000 till 2008.) ↓
1990	(Sweden) Stefan Edberg	(United States) Andre Agassi	6–4, 5–7, 7–6^{(7–1)}, 7–6^{(8–6)}
1991	(United States) Jim Courier	(France) Guy Forget	4–6, 6–3, 4–6, 6–3, 7–6^{(7–4)}
1992	(United States) Michael Chang	(Commonwealth of Independent States) Andrei Chesnokov	6–3, 6–4, 7–5
1993	(United States) Jim Courier (2)	(South Africa) Wayne Ferreira	6–3, 6–3, 6–1
1994	(United States) Pete Sampras	(Czech Republic) Petr Korda	4–6, 6–3, 3–6, 6–3, 6–2
1995	(United States) Pete Sampras (2)	(United States) Andre Agassi	7–5, 6–3, 7–5
1996	(United States) Michael Chang (2)	(Netherlands) Paul Haarhuis	7–5, 6–1, 6–1
1997	(United States) Michael Chang (3)	(Czech Republic) Bohdan Ulihrach	4–6, 6–3, 6–4, 6–3
1998	(Chile) Marcelo Ríos	(United Kingdom) Greg Rusedski	6–3, 6–7^{(15–17)}, 7–6^{(7–4)}, 6–4
1999	(Australia) Mark Philippoussis	(Spain) Carlos Moyá	5–7, 6–4, 6–4, 4–6, 6–2
2000	(Spain) Àlex Corretja	(Sweden) Thomas Enqvist	6–4, 6–4, 6–3
2001	(United States) Andre Agassi	(United States) Pete Sampras	7–6^{(7–5)}, 7–5, 6–1
2002	(Australia) Lleyton Hewitt	(United Kingdom) Tim Henman	6–1, 6–2
2003	(Australia) Lleyton Hewitt (2)	(Brazil) Gustavo Kuerten	6–1, 6–1
2004	(Switzerland) Roger Federer	(United Kingdom) Tim Henman	6–3, 6–3
2005	(Switzerland) Roger Federer (2)	(Australia) Lleyton Hewitt	6–2, 6–4, 6–4
2006	(Switzerland) Roger Federer (3)	(United States) James Blake	7–5, 6–3, 6–0
2007	(Spain) Rafael Nadal	(Serbia) Novak Djokovic	6–2, 7–5
2008	(Serbia) Novak Djokovic	(United States) Mardy Fish	6–2, 5–7, 6–3
2009	(Spain) Rafael Nadal (2)	(United Kingdom) Andy Murray	6–1, 6–2
2010	(Croatia) Ivan Ljubičić	(United States) Andy Roddick	7–6^{(7–3)}, 7–6^{(7–5)}
2011	(Serbia) Novak Djokovic (2)	(Spain) Rafael Nadal	4–6, 6–3, 6–2
2012	(Switzerland) Roger Federer (4)	(United States) John Isner	7–6^{(9–7)}, 6–3
2013	(Spain) Rafael Nadal (3)	(Argentina) Juan Martín del Potro	4–6, 6–3, 6–4
2014	(Serbia) Novak Djokovic (3)	(Switzerland) Roger Federer	3–6, 6–3, 7–6^{(7–3)}
2015	(Serbia) Novak Djokovic (4)	(Switzerland) Roger Federer	6–3, 6–7^{(5–7)}, 6–2
2016	(Serbia) Novak Djokovic (5)	(Canada) Milos Raonic	6–2, 6–0
2017	(Switzerland) Roger Federer (5)	(Switzerland) Stan Wawrinka	6–4, 7–5
2018	(Argentina) Juan Martín del Potro	(Switzerland) Roger Federer	6–4, 6–7^{(8–10)}, 7–6^{(7–2)}
2019	(Austria) Dominic Thiem	(Switzerland) Roger Federer	3–6, 6–3, 7–5
2020	Not held (due to COVID-19 pandemic)		
2021	(United Kingdom) Cameron Norrie	(Georgia (country)) Nikoloz Basilashvili	3–6, 6–4, 6–1
2022	(United States) Taylor Fritz	(Spain) Rafael Nadal	6–3, 7–6^{(7–5)}
2023	(Spain) Carlos Alcaraz	(Note: Competed under no flag due to the Russian invasion of Ukraine.) Daniil Medvedev	6–3, 6–2
2024	(Spain) Carlos Alcaraz (2)	Daniil Medvedev	7–6^{(7–5)}, 6–1
2025	(United Kingdom) Jack Draper	(Denmark) Holger Rune	6–2, 6–2
2026	(Italy) Jannik Sinner	Daniil Medvedev	7–6^{(8–6)}, 7–6^{(7–4)}

=== Women's singles ===
Year	Champions	Runners-up	Score
↓ Tier III tournament ↓
1989	(Bulgaria) Manuela Maleeva (1/1)	(Australia) Jenny Byrne	6–4, 6–1
↓ Tier II tournament ↓
1990	(United States) Martina Navratilova (1/2)	(Czechoslovakia) Helena Suková	6–2, 5–7, 6–1
1991	(United States) Martina Navratilova (2/2)	(Socialist Federal Republic of Yugoslavia) Monica Seles	6–2, 7–6^{(8–6)}
1992	(Socialist Federal Republic of Yugoslavia) Monica Seles (1/1)	(Spain) Conchita Martínez	6–3, 6–1
1993	(United States) Mary Joe Fernández (1/2)	(South Africa) Amanda Coetzer	3–6, 6–1, 7–6^{(8–6)}
1994	(Germany) Steffi Graf (1/2)	(South Africa) Amanda Coetzer	6–0, 6–4
1995	(United States) Mary Joe Fernández (2/2)	(Belarus) Natasha Zvereva	6–4, 6–3
↓ Tier I tournament ↓
1996	(Germany) Steffi Graf (2/2)	(Spain) Conchita Martínez	7–6^{(7–5)}, 7–6^{(7–5)}
1997	(United States) Lindsay Davenport (1/2)	(Romania) Irina Spîrlea	6–2, 6–1
1998	(Switzerland) Martina Hingis (1/1)	(United States) Lindsay Davenport	6–3, 6–4
1999	(United States) Serena Williams (1/2)	(Germany) Steffi Graf	6–3, 3–6, 7–5
2000	(United States) Lindsay Davenport (2/2)	(Switzerland) Martina Hingis	4–6, 6–4, 6–0
2001	(United States) Serena Williams (2/2)	(Belgium) Kim Clijsters	4–6, 6–4, 6–2
2002	(Slovakia) Daniela Hantuchová (1/2)	(Switzerland) Martina Hingis	6–3, 6–4
2003	(Belgium) Kim Clijsters (1/2)	(United States) Lindsay Davenport	6–4, 7–5
2004	(Belgium) Justine Henin (1/1)	(United States) Lindsay Davenport	6–1, 6–4
2005	(Belgium) Kim Clijsters (2/2)	(United States) Lindsay Davenport	6–4, 4–6, 6–2
2006	(Russia) Maria Sharapova (1/2)	(Russia) Elena Dementieva	6–1, 6–2
2007	(Slovakia) Daniela Hantuchová (2/2)	(Russia) Svetlana Kuznetsova	6–3, 6–4
2008	(Serbia) Ana Ivanovic (1/1)	(Russia) Svetlana Kuznetsova	6–4, 6–3
↓ Premier Mandatory tournament ↓
2009	(Russia) Vera Zvonareva (1/1)	(Serbia) Ana Ivanovic	7–6^{(7–5)}, 6–2
2010	(Serbia) Jelena Janković (1/1)	(Denmark) Caroline Wozniacki	6–2, 6–4
2011	(Denmark) Caroline Wozniacki (1/1)	(France) Marion Bartoli	6–1, 2–6, 6–3
2012	(Belarus) Victoria Azarenka (1/2)	(Russia) Maria Sharapova	6–2, 6–3
2013	(Russia) Maria Sharapova (2/2)	(Denmark) Caroline Wozniacki	6–2, 6–2
2014	(Italy) Flavia Pennetta (1/1)	(Poland) Agnieszka Radwańska	6–2, 6–1
2015	(Romania) Simona Halep (1/1)	(Serbia) Jelena Janković	2–6, 7–5, 6–4
2016	(Belarus) Victoria Azarenka (2/2)	(United States) Serena Williams	6–4, 6–4
2017	(Russia) Elena Vesnina (1/1)	(Russia) Svetlana Kuznetsova	6–7^{(6–8)}, 7–5, 6–4
2018	(Japan) Naomi Osaka (1/1)	(Russia) Daria Kasatkina	6–3, 6–2
2019	(Canada) Bianca Andreescu (1/1)	(Germany) Angelique Kerber	6–4, 3–6, 6–4
2020	Not held (due to COVID-19 pandemic)		
↓ WTA 1000 tournament ↓
2021	(Spain) Paula Badosa (1/1)	(Belarus) Victoria Azarenka	7–6^{(7–5)}, 2–6, 7–6^{(7–2)}
2022	(Poland) Iga Świątek (1/2)	(Greece) Maria Sakkari	6–4, 6–1
2023	(Kazakhstan) Elena Rybakina (1/1)	Aryna Sabalenka	7–6^{(13–11)}, 6–4
2024	(Poland) Iga Świątek (2/2)	(Greece) Maria Sakkari	6–4, 6–0
2025	Mirra Andreeva (1/1)	Aryna Sabalenka	2–6, 6–4, 6–3
2026	Aryna Sabalenka (1/1)	(Kazakhstan) Elena Rybakina	3–6, 6–3, 7–6^{(8–6)}

=== Men's doubles ===
Year	Champions	Runners-up	Score
1974	(United States) Charlie Pasarell (United States) Sherwood Stewart	(United States) Tom Edlefsen (Spain) Manuel Orantes	6–4, 6–4
1975	(United States) William Brown (Mexico) Raúl Ramírez	(South Africa) Raymond Moore (United States) Dennis Ralston	2–6, 7–6, 6–4
1976	(Australia) Colin Dibley (United States) Sandy Mayer	(South Africa) Raymond Moore (United States) Erik van Dillen	6–4, 6–7, 7–6
↓ Grand Prix circuit ↓
1977	(South Africa) Bob Hewitt (South Africa) Frew McMillan	(United States) Marty Riessen (United States) Roscoe Tanner	7–6, 7–6
1978	(South Africa) Raymond Moore (United States) Roscoe Tanner	(South Africa) Bob Hewitt (South Africa) Frew McMillan	6–4, 6–4
1979	(United States) Gene Mayer (United States) Sandy Mayer (2)	(South Africa) Cliff Drysdale (United States) Bruce Manson	6–4, 7–6
1980	Final not held due to rain (tournament cancelled at the semifinal stage)		
1981	(United States) Bruce Manson (United States) Brian Teacher	(United States) Terry Moor (United States) Eliot Teltscher	7–6, 6–2
1982	(United States) Brian Gottfried (Mexico) Raúl Ramírez (2)	(United Kingdom) John Lloyd (United States) Dick Stockton	6–4, 3–6, 6–2
1983	(United States) Brian Gottfried (2) (Mexico) Raúl Ramírez (3)	(South Africa) Tian Viljoen (South Africa) Danie Visser	6–3, 6–3
1984	(South Africa) Bernard Mitton (United States) Butch Walts	(United States) Scott Davis (United States) Ferdi Taygan	5–7, 6–3, 6–2
1985	(Switzerland) Heinz Günthardt (Hungary) Balázs Taróczy	(United States) Ken Flach (United States) Robert Seguso	3–6, 7–6, 6–3
1986	(United States) Peter Fleming (France) Guy Forget	(France) Yannick Noah (United States) Sherwood Stewart	6–4, 6–3
1987	(France) Guy Forget (2) (France) Yannick Noah	(West Germany) Boris Becker (West Germany) Eric Jelen	6–4, 7–6
1988	(West Germany) Boris Becker (France) Guy Forget (3)	(Mexico) Jorge Lozano (United States) Todd Witsken	6–4, 6–4
1989	(West Germany) Boris Becker (2) (Switzerland) Jakob Hlasek	(United States) Kevin Curren (United States) David Pate	7–6, 7–5
↓ ATP 1000 tournament ↓
1990	(West Germany) Boris Becker (3) (France) Guy Forget (4)	(United States) Jim Grabb (United States) Patrick McEnroe	4–6, 6–4, 6–3
1991	(United States) Jim Courier (Spain) Javier Sánchez	(France) Guy Forget (France) Henri Leconte	7–6, 3–6, 6–3
1992	(United States) Steve DeVries (Australia) David Macpherson	(United States) Kent Kinnear (United States) Sven Salumaa	4–6, 6–3, 6–3
1993	(France) Guy Forget (5) (France) Henri Leconte	(United States) Luke Jensen (United States) Scott Melville	6–4, 7–5
1994	(Canada) Grant Connell (United States) Patrick Galbraith	(Zimbabwe) Byron Black (United States) Jonathan Stark	7–5, 6–3
1995	(United States) Tommy Ho (New Zealand) Brett Steven	(South Africa) Gary Muller (South Africa) Piet Norval	6–4, 7–6
1996	(Australia) Todd Woodbridge (Australia) Mark Woodforde	(United States) Brian MacPhie (Australia) Michael Tebbutt	1–6, 6–2, 6–2
1997	(The Bahamas) Mark Knowles (Canada) Daniel Nestor	(Australia) Mark Philippoussis (Australia) Patrick Rafter	7–6, 4–6, 7–5
1998	(Sweden) Jonas Björkman (Australia) Patrick Rafter	(United States) Todd Martin (United States) Richey Reneberg	6–4, 7–6
1999	(Zimbabwe) Wayne Black (Australia) Sandon Stolle	(South Africa) Ellis Ferreira (United States) Rick Leach	7–6^{(7–4)}, 6–3
2000	(United States) Alex O'Brien (United States) Jared Palmer	(Netherlands) Paul Haarhuis (Australia) Sandon Stolle	6–4, 7–6^{(7–5)}
2001	(South Africa) Wayne Ferreira (Russia) Yevgeny Kafelnikov	(Sweden) Jonas Björkman (Australia) Todd Woodbridge	6–2, 7–5
2002	(The Bahamas) Mark Knowles (2) (Canada) Daniel Nestor (2)	(Switzerland) Roger Federer (Belarus) Max Mirnyi	6–4, 6–4
2003	(South Africa) Wayne Ferreira (2) (Russia) Yevgeny Kafelnikov (2)	(United States) Bob Bryan (United States) Mike Bryan	3–6, 7–5, 6–4
2004	(France) Arnaud Clément (France) Sébastien Grosjean	(Zimbabwe) Wayne Black (Zimbabwe) Kevin Ullyett	6–3, 4–6, 7–5
2005	(The Bahamas) Mark Knowles (3) (Canada) Daniel Nestor (3)	(Australia) Wayne Arthurs (Australia) Paul Hanley	7–6^{(8–6)}, 7–6^{(7–2)}
2006	(The Bahamas) Mark Knowles (4) (Canada) Daniel Nestor (4)	(United States) Bob Bryan (United States) Mike Bryan	6–4, 6–4
2007	(Czech Republic) Martin Damm (India) Leander Paes	(Israel) Jonathan Erlich (Israel) Andy Ram	6–4, 6–4
2008	(Israel) Jonathan Erlich (Israel) Andy Ram	(Canada) Daniel Nestor (Serbia) Nenad Zimonjić	6–4, 6–4
2009	(United States) Mardy Fish (United States) Andy Roddick	(Belarus) Max Mirnyi (Israel) Andy Ram	3–6, 6–1, [14–12]
2010	(Spain) Marc López (Spain) Rafael Nadal	(Canada) Daniel Nestor (Serbia) Nenad Zimonjić	7–6^{(10–8)}, 6–3
2011	(Ukraine) Alexandr Dolgopolov (Belgium) Xavier Malisse	(Switzerland) Roger Federer (Switzerland) Stanislas Wawrinka	6–4, 6–7^{(5–7)}, [10–7]
2012	(Spain) Marc López (2) (Spain) Rafael Nadal (2)	(United States) John Isner (United States) Sam Querrey	6–2, 7–6^{(7–3)}
2013	(United States) Bob Bryan (United States) Mike Bryan	(Philippines) Treat Conrad Huey (Poland) Jerzy Janowicz	6–3, 3–6, [10–6]
2014	(United States) Bob Bryan (2) (United States) Mike Bryan (2)	(Austria) Alexander Peya (Brazil) Bruno Soares	6–4, 6–3
2015	(Canada) Vasek Pospisil (United States) Jack Sock	(Italy) Simone Bolelli (Italy) Fabio Fognini	6–4, 6–7^{(3–7)}, [10–7]
2016	(France) Pierre-Hugues Herbert (France) Nicolas Mahut	(Canada) Vasek Pospisil (United States) Jack Sock	6–3, 7–6^{(7–5)}
2017	(South Africa) Raven Klaasen (United States) Rajeev Ram	(Poland) Łukasz Kubot (Brazil) Marcelo Melo	6–7^{(1–7)}, 6–4, [10–8]
2018	(United States) John Isner (United States) Jack Sock (2)	(United States) Bob Bryan (United States) Mike Bryan	7–6^{(7–4)}, 7–6^{(7–2)}
2019	(Croatia) Nikola Mektić (Argentina) Horacio Zeballos	(Poland) Łukasz Kubot (Brazil) Marcelo Melo	4–6, 6–4, [10–3]
2020	Not held (due to COVID-19 pandemic)		
2021	(Australia) John Peers (Slovakia) Filip Polášek	(Russia) Aslan Karatsev (Russia) Andrey Rublev	6–3, 7–6^{(7–5)}
2022	(United States) John Isner (2) (United States) Jack Sock (3)	(Mexico) Santiago González (France) Édouard Roger-Vasselin	7–6^{(7–4)}, 6–3
2023	(India) Rohan Bopanna (Australia) Matthew Ebden	(Netherlands) Wesley Koolhof (United Kingdom) Neal Skupski	6–3, 2–6, [10–8]
2024	(Netherlands) Wesley Koolhof (Croatia) Nikola Mektić (2)	(Spain) Marcel Granollers (Argentina) Horacio Zeballos	7–6^{(7–2)}, 7–6^{(7–4)}
2025	(El Salvador) Marcelo Arévalo (Croatia) Mate Pavić	(United States) Sebastian Korda (Australia) Jordan Thompson	6–3, 6–4
2026	(Argentina) Guido Andreozzi (France) Manuel Guinard	(France) Arthur Rinderknech (Monaco) Valentin Vacherot	7–6^{(7–3)}, 6–3

=== Women's doubles ===
Year	Champions	Runners-up	Score
1989	(Australia) Hana Mandlíková (United States) Pam Shriver	(South Africa) Rosalyn Fairbank (United States) Gretchen Rush-Magers	6–3, 6–7^{(4–7)}, 6–3
1990	(Czechoslovakia) Jana Novotná (Czechoslovakia) Helena Suková	(United States) Gigi Fernández (United States) Martina Navratilova	6–2, 7–6^{(8–6)}
1991	Final not held due to rain		
1992	(West Germany) Claudia Kohde-Kilsch (United States) Stephanie Rehe	(Canada) Jill Hetherington (United States) Kathy Rinaldi	6–3, 6–3
1993	(Australia) Rennae Stubbs (Czech Republic) Helena Suková (2)	(United States) Ann Grossman (Canada) Patricia Hy	6–3, 6–4
1994	(United States) Lindsay Davenport (United States) Lisa Raymond	(Netherlands) Manon Bollegraf (Czech Republic) Helena Suková	6–2, 6–4
1995	(United States) Lindsay Davenport (2) (United States) Lisa Raymond (2)	(Latvia) Larisa Savchenko Neiland (Spain) Arantxa Sánchez	2–6, 6–4, 6–3
1996	(United States) Chanda Rubin (Netherlands) Brenda Schultz-McCarthy	(France) Julie Halard (France) Nathalie Tauziat	6–1, 6–4
1997	(United States) Lindsay Davenport (3) (Belarus) Natasha Zvereva	(United States) Lisa Raymond (France) Nathalie Tauziat	6–3, 6–2
1998	(United States) Lindsay Davenport (4) (Belarus) Natasha Zvereva (2)	(France) Alexandra Fusai (France) Nathalie Tauziat	6–4, 2–6, 6–4
1999	(Switzerland) Martina Hingis (Russia) Anna Kournikova	(United States) Mary Joe Fernández (Czech Republic) Jana Novotná	6–2, 6–2
2000	(United States) Lindsay Davenport (5) (United States) Corina Morariu	(Russia) Anna Kournikova (Belarus) Natasha Zvereva	6–2, 6–3
2001	(United States) Nicole Arendt (Japan) Ai Sugiyama	(Spain) Virginia Ruano (Argentina) Paola Suárez	6–4, 6–4
2002	(United States) Lisa Raymond (3) (Australia) Rennae Stubbs (2)	(Russia) Elena Dementieva (Slovakia) Janette Husárová	7–5, 6–0
2003	(United States) Lindsay Davenport (6) (United States) Lisa Raymond (4)	(Belgium) Kim Clijsters (Japan) Ai Sugiyama	3–6, 6–4, 6–1
2004	(Spain) Virginia Ruano Pascual (Argentina) Paola Suárez	(Russia) Svetlana Kuznetsova (Russia) Elena Likhovtseva	6–1, 6–2
2005	(Spain) Virginia Ruano Pascual (2) (Argentina) Paola Suárez (2)	(Russia) Nadia Petrova (United States) Meghann Shaughnessy	7–6^{(7–3)}, 6–1
2006	(United States) Lisa Raymond (5) (Australia) Samantha Stosur	(Spain) Virginia Ruano (United States) Meghann Shaughnessy	6–2, 7–5
2007	(United States) Lisa Raymond (6) (Australia) Samantha Stosur (2)	(Chinese Taipei) Chan Yung-jan (Chinese Taipei) Chuang Chia-jung	6–3, 7–5
2008	(Russia) Dinara Safina (Russia) Elena Vesnina	(China) Yan Zi (China) Zheng Jie	6–1, 1–6, [10–8]
2009	(Belarus) Victoria Azarenka (Russia) Vera Zvonareva	(Argentina) Gisela Dulko (Israel) Shahar Pe'er	6–4, 3–6, [10–5]
2010	(Czech Republic) Květa Peschke (Slovenia) Katarina Srebotnik	(Russia) Nadia Petrova (Australia) Samantha Stosur	6–4, 2–6, [10–5]
2011	(India) Sania Mirza (Russia) Elena Vesnina (2)	(United States) Bethanie Mattek-Sands (United States) Meghann Shaughnessy	6–0, 7–5
2012	(United States) Liezel Huber (United States) Lisa Raymond (7)	(India) Sania Mirza (Russia) Elena Vesnina	6–2, 6–3
2013	(Russia) Ekaterina Makarova (Russia) Elena Vesnina (3)	(Russia) Nadia Petrova (Slovenia) Katarina Srebotnik	6–0, 5–7, [10–6]
2014	(Chinese Taipei) Hsieh Su-wei (China) Peng Shuai	(Zimbabwe) Cara Black (India) Sania Mirza	7–6^{(7–5)}, 6–2
2015	(Switzerland) Martina Hingis (2) (India) Sania Mirza (2)	(Russia) Ekaterina Makarova (Russia) Elena Vesnina	6–3, 6–4
2016	(United States) Bethanie Mattek-Sands (United States) CoCo Vandeweghe	(Germany) Julia Görges (Czech Republic) Karolína Plíšková	4–6, 6–4, [10–6]
2017	(Chinese Taipei) Chan Yung-jan (Switzerland) Martina Hingis (3)	(Czech Republic) Lucie Hradecká (Czech Republic) Kateřina Siniaková	7–6^{(7–4)}, 6–2
2018	(Chinese Taipei) Hsieh Su-wei (2) (Czech Republic) Barbora Strýcová	(Russia) Ekaterina Makarova (Russia) Elena Vesnina	6–4, 6–4
2019	(Belgium) Elise Mertens (Belarus) Aryna Sabalenka	(Czech Republic) Barbora Krejčíková (Czech Republic) Kateřina Siniaková	6–3, 6–2
2020	Not held (due to COVID-19 pandemic)		
2021	(Chinese Taipei) Hsieh Su-wei (3) (Belgium) Elise Mertens (2)	(Russia) Veronika Kudermetova (Kazakhstan) Elena Rybakina	7–6^{(7–1)}, 6–3
2022	(China) Xu Yifan (China) Yang Zhaoxuan	(United States) Asia Muhammad (Japan) Ena Shibahara	7–5, 7–6^{(7–4)}
2023	(Czech Republic) Barbora Krejčíková (Czech Republic) Kateřina Siniaková	(Brazil) Beatriz Haddad Maia (Germany) Laura Siegemund	6–1, 6–7^{(3–7)}, [10–7]
2024	(Chinese Taipei) Hsieh Su-wei (4) (Belgium) Elise Mertens (3)	(Australia) Storm Hunter (Czech Republic) Kateřina Siniaková	6–3, 6–4
2025	(United States) Asia Muhammad (Netherlands) Demi Schuurs	(Slovakia) Tereza Mihalíková (United Kingdom) Olivia Nicholls	6–2, 7–6^{(7–4)}
2026	(Czech Republic) Kateřina Siniaková (2) (United States) Taylor Townsend	(Kazakhstan) Anna Danilina (Serbia) Aleksandra Krunić	7–6^{(7–4)}, 6–4

=== Mixed doubles ===
Year	Champions	Runners-up	Score
2024	(Australia) Storm Hunter (Australia) Matthew Ebden	(France) Caroline Garcia (France) Édouard Roger-Vasselin	6–3, 6–3
2025	(Italy) Sara Errani (Italy) Andrea Vavassori	(United States) Bethanie Mattek-Sands (Croatia) Mate Pavić	6–7^{(3–7)}, 6–3, [10–8]
2026	(Switzerland) Belinda Bencic (Italy) Flavio Cobolli	(Canada) Gabriela Dabrowski (United Kingdom) Lloyd Glasspool	6–3, 2–6, [10–7]

== Records ==
=== Men's singles ===
Most titles	(Switzerland) Roger Federer	5
Most titles	(Serbia) Novak Djokovic	5
Most finals	(Switzerland) Roger Federer	9
Most consecutive titles	(Switzerland) Roger Federer (2004, 2005, 2006)	3
Most consecutive titles	(Serbia) Novak Djokovic (2014, 2015, 2016)	3
Most consecutive finals	(Switzerland) Roger Federer (2004, 2005, 2006) (2017, 2018, 2019)	3
Most consecutive finals	(Serbia) Novak Djokovic (2014, 2015, 2016)	3
Most matches played	(Switzerland) Roger Federer	79
Most matches won	(Switzerland) Roger Federer	66
Most consecutive matches won	(Serbia) Novak Djokovic	19
Most editions played	(Switzerland) Roger Federer	18
Most editions played	(Spain) Feliciano López	18
Best winning % active	(Spain) Carlos Alcaraz	85.71% (24–4)
Youngest champion	(West Germany) Boris Becker	19y, 2m, 26d (1987)
Oldest champion	(Switzerland) Roger Federer	35y, 7m, 11d (2017)

Longest final
1991 (51 games)
(United States) Jim Courier	4	6	4	6	7^{7}
(France) Guy Forget	6	3	6	3	6^{4}

Shortest final
2016 (14 games)
(Serbia) Novak Djokovic	6	6
(Canada) Milos Raonic	2	0

=== Women's singles ===
Most titles	(United States) Martina Navratilova	2
Most titles	(United States) Mary Joe Fernández	2
Most titles	(Germany) Steffi Graf	2
Most titles	(United States) Lindsay Davenport	2
Most titles	(United States) Serena Williams	2
Most titles	(Belgium) Kim Clijsters	2
Most titles	(Slovakia) Daniela Hantuchová	2
Most titles	(Russia) Maria Sharapova	2
Most titles	(Belarus) Victoria Azarenka	2
Most titles	(Poland) Iga Świątek	2
Most finals	(United States) Lindsay Davenport	6
Most consecutive titles	(United States) Martina Navratilova (1990, 1991)	2
Most consecutive finals	(United States) Lindsay Davenport (2003, 2004, 2005)	3
Most consecutive matches won	(United States) Martina Navratilova	10
Most consecutive matches won	(Serbia) Ana Ivanovic	10
Most consecutive matches won	(Poland) Iga Świątek	10

== Sunshine double ==
The term Sunshine Double is a feat in tennis achieved when a player wins the titles of both Indian Wells Open and the Miami Open tournaments back-to-back. For a list of players who have achieved the "Sunshine double" see Miami Open (tennis)#Sunshine Double.

== See also ==
=== ATP Tour ===
- ATP Tour Masters 1000
- Grand Prix Super Series
- List of ATP Tour top-level tournament singles champions
- Tennis Masters Series records and statistics

=== WTA Tour ===
- WTA 1000 tournaments
- WTA Premier Mandatory/5
- WTA Tier I tournaments
- List of WTA Tour top-level tournament singles champions

== Notes ==
Awards and achievements
Preceded by San Diego; Miami	Favorite WTA Tier I – II Tournament; 1997; 2005, 2006	Succeeded by Toronto; Stuttgart
Preceded by Stuttgart (Tier I – II)	Favorite WTA Premier Tournament; 2009	Succeeded by Stuttgart
