= 1991 Newsweek Champions Cup – Singles =

Singles
- 1991 Newsweek Champions Cup

Final
- Champion: (United States) Jim Courier
- Runner-up: (France) Guy Forget
- Score: 4–6, 6–3, 4–6, 6–3, 7–6^{(7–4)}

Events
| Singles | Doubles |
| ← 1990 · | Newsweek Champions Cup | · 1992 → |

Jim Courier defeated Guy Forget in the final, 4–6, 6–3, 4–6, 6–3, 7–6^{(7–4)} to win the men's singles tennis title at the 1991 Indian Wells Masters.

Stefan Edberg was the defending champion, but lost to Forget in the semifinals.

== Seeds ==
The top eight seeds receive a bye into the second round.

1. (Sweden) Stefan Edberg (semifinals)
2. (United States) Andre Agassi (third round)
3. (France) Guy Forget (final)
4. (United States) ~~Pete Sampras~~ (withdrew)
5. (Socialist Federal Republic of Yugoslavia) Goran Ivanišević (second round)
6. (Austria) Thomas Muster (second round)
7. (Spain) Emilio Sánchez (quarterfinals)
8. (Ecuador) Andrés Gómez (second round)
9. (United States) Michael Chang (quarterfinals)
10. (Soviet Union) Andrei Cherkasov (third round)
11. (Germany) Michael Stich (semifinals)
12. (United States) John McEnroe (second round)
13. (Soviet Union) Alexander Volkov (second round)
14. (Switzerland) Marc Rosset (second round)
15. (Spain) Juan Aguilera (first round)
16. (United States) Jim Courier (champion)

== Draw ==
=== Key ===
- Q = Qualifier
- WC = Wild card
- LL = Lucky loser
- Alt = Alternate
- ITF = ITF entry
- PR = Protected ranking
- SR = Special ranking
- SE = Special exempt
- JE = Junior exempt
- JR = Junior Accelerator Programme entrant
- CO = College Accelerator Programme entrant
- NG = Next Gen Accelerator Program entrant
- w/o = Walkover
- r = Retired
- d = Defaulted

=== Finals ===
Quarterfinals
1 | (Sweden) Stefan Edberg | 1 | 6 | 7
9 | (United States) Michael Chang | 6 | 2 | 5
3 | (France) Guy Forget | 7 | 6
(United States) Scott Davis | 5 | 1
11 | (Germany) Michael Stich | 6 | 2 | 6
(United States) Richey Reneberg | 0 | 6 | 4
7 | (Spain) Emilio Sánchez | 2 | 2
16 | (United States) Jim Courier | 6 | 6

Semifinals
1 | (Sweden) Stefan Edberg | 4 | 4
3 | (France) Guy Forget | 6 | 6
11 | (Germany) Michael Stich | 3 | 2
16 | (United States) Jim Courier | 6 | 6

Final
3 | (France) Guy Forget | 6 | 3 | 6 | 3 | 6^{4}
16 | (United States) Jim Courier | 4 | 6 | 4 | 6 | 7^{7}

=== Section 1 ===
First round
(Argentina) M Jaite | 7 | 5 | 6
(United States) D Wheaton | 5 | 7 | 4
(Australia) D Cahill | 6 | 6
(Finland) V Paloheimo | 3 | 4
Q | (United States) S Bryan | 6 | 6
15 | (Spain) J Aguilera | 3 | 1
9 | (United States) M Chang | 6 | 6
(Uruguay) M Filippini | 1 | 1
(France) H Leconte | 6^{6} | 3
(United States) J Arias | 7^{8} | 6
(France) J Fleurian | 4 | 4
Q | (South Africa) W Ferreira | 6 | 6

Second round
1 | (Sweden) S Edberg | 6 | 6
(Argentina) M Jaite | 3 | 2
(Australia) D Cahill | 7^{7} | 6
Q | (United States) S Bryan | 6^{1} | 2
9 | (United States) M Chang | 6 | 4 | 6
(United States) J Arias | 4 | 6 | 1
Q | (South Africa) W Ferreira | 6 | 7^{7}
8 | (Ecuador) Gómez | 4 | 6^{5}

Third round
1 | (Sweden) S Edberg | 3 | 7 | 6
(Australia) D Cahill | 6 | 5 | 2
9 | (United States) M Chang | 6 | 3 | 6
Q | (South Africa) W Ferreira | 3 | 6 | 4

Quarterfinals
1 | (Sweden) S Edberg | 1 | 6 | 7
9 | (United States) M Chang | 6 | 2 | 5

=== Section 2 ===
First round
(Spain) T Carbonell | 6 | 6
(South Africa) G Muller | 4 | 1
Q | (United States) D Goldie | 4 | 5
(United States) D Rostagno | 6 | 7
(Sweden) P Lundgren | 6^{8} | 4
14 | (Switzerland) M Rosset | 7^{10} | 6
12 | (United States) J McEnroe | 7^{7} | 2 | 7
(Australia) W Masur | 6^{5} | 6 | 5
(United States) J Grabb | 7^{7} | 2 | 6
(Israel) G Bloom | 6^{5} | 6 | 1
(United States) S Davis | 7^{7} | 7
(Spain) J Sánchez | 6^{5} | 5

Second round
3 | (France) G Forget | 6 | 6
(Spain) T Carbonell | 1 | 3
(United States) D Rostagno | 7 | 6
14 | (Switzerland) M Rosset | 5 | 1
12 | (United States) J McEnroe | 6^{7} | 5
(United States) J Grabb | 7^{9} | 7
(United States) S Davis | 6 | 6
6 | (Austria) T Muster | 3 | 2

Third round
3 | (France) G Forget | 6 | 6
(United States) D Rostagno | 3 | 1
(United States) J Grabb | 4 | 4
(United States) S Davis | 6 | 6

Quarterfinals
3 | (France) G Forget | 7 | 6
(United States) S Davis | 5 | 1

=== Section 3 ===
First round
(Finland) A Rahunen | 1 | 4
(France) F Santoro | 6 | 6
WC | (United States) G Layendecker | 4 | 6 | 6
Q | (United States) K Jones | 6 | 3 | 3
(United States) T Mayotte | 3 | 1
11 | (Germany) M Stich | 6 | 6
13 | (Soviet Union) A Volkov | 6^{5} | 6 | 6
(France) T Champion | 7^{7} | 3 | 4
(United States) K Curren | 7^{7} | 6^{7} | 6^{6}
(United States) R Reneberg | 6^{2} | 7^{9} | 7^{8}
WC | (Italy) C Caratti | 1 | 7 | 6^{2}
Q | (Italy) R Furlan | 6 | 5 | 7^{7}

Second round
5 | (Socialist Federal Republic of Yugoslavia) G Ivanišević | 0 | 2
(France) F Santoro | 6 | 6
WC | (United States) G Layendecker | 3 | 6^{3}
11 | (Germany) M Stich | 6 | 7^{7}
13 | (Soviet Union) A Volkov | 7^{7} | 2 | 4
(United States) R Reneberg | 6^{4} | 6 | 6
Q | (Italy) R Furlan | 0 | 7^{9} | 2
LL | (Spain) F Clavet | 6 | 6^{7} | 6

Third round
(France) F Santoro | 6 | 3 | 4
11 | (Germany) M Stich | 4 | 6 | 6
(United States) R Reneberg | 2 | 6 | 6
LL | (Spain) F Clavet | 6 | 3 | 0

Quarterfinals
11 | (Germany) M Stich | 6 | 2 | 6
(United States) R Reneberg | 0 | 6 | 4

=== Section 4 ===
First round
(Spain) S Bruguera | 7 | 7
(United States) T Witsken | 5 | 5
Q | (United States) B Pearce | 4 | 2
(Brazil) L Mattar | 6 | 6
(Czechoslovakia) P Korda | 5 | 1
10 | (Soviet Union) A Cherkasov | 7 | 6
16 | (United States) J Courier | 6 | 3 | 6
WC | (France) G Raoux | 4 | 6 | 2
(Czechoslovakia) M Vajda | 1 | 6 | 3
WC | (Zimbabwe) B Black | 6 | 3 | 6
Q | (Venezuela) M Ruah | 3 | 1
(Socialist Federal Republic of Yugoslavia) G Prpić | 6 | 6

Second round
7 | (Spain) E Sánchez | 6 | 6
(Spain) S Bruguera | 4 | 4
(Brazil) L Mattar | 5 | 7^{7} | 4
10 | (Soviet Union) A Cherkasov | 7 | 6^{5} | 6
16 | (United States) J Courier | 6 | 7^{7}
(Zimbabwe) B Black | 1 | 6^{4}
(Socialist Federal Republic of Yugoslavia) G Prpić | 3 | 4
2 | (United States) A Agassi | 6 | 6

Third round
7 | (Spain) E Sánchez | 6 | 7^{7}
10 | (Soviet Union) A Cherkasov | 3 | 6^{2}
16 | (United States) J Courier | 2 | 6 | 6
2 | (United States) A Agassi | 6 | 3 | 4

Quarterfinals
7 | (Spain) E Sánchez | 2 | 2
16 | (United States) J Courier | 6 | 6
