= 1989 Newsweek Champions Cup – Singles =

Singles
- 1989 Newsweek Champions Cup

Final
- Champion: (Czechoslovakia) Miloslav Mečíř
- Runner-up: (France) Yannick Noah
- Score: 3–6, 2–6, 6–1, 6–2, 6–3

Events
Singles	Doubles
← 1988 ·	Newsweek Champions Cup	· 1990 →

Boris Becker was the two-time defending champion but lost in the third round to Jay Berger.

Miloslav Mečíř won in the final 3–6, 2–6, 6–1, 6–2, 6–3 against Yannick Noah.

== Seeds ==
The top eight seeds received a bye into the second round.

1. (West Germany) Boris Becker (third round)
2. (Sweden) Stefan Edberg (third round)
3. (United States) Andre Agassi (quarterfinals)
4. (United States) Jimmy Connors (semifinals)
5. (Switzerland) Jakob Hlasek (third round)
6. (United States) Tim Mayotte (quarterfinals)
7. (Czechoslovakia) Miloslav Mečíř (champion)
8. (Austria) Thomas Muster (second round)
9. (United States) Aaron Krickstein (first round)
10. (United States) Brad Gilbert (quarterfinals)
11. (Spain) Emilio Sánchez (third round)
12. (France) Yannick Noah (final)
13. (Soviet Union) Andrei Chesnokov (third round)
14. (United States) Kevin Curren (second round)
15. (Ecuador) Andrés Gómez (second round)
16. (United States) Michael Chang (quarterfinals)

== Draw ==
=== Key ===
- Q = Qualifier
- WC = Wild card
- LL = Lucky loser
- Alt = Alternate
- SE = Special exempt
- PR = Protected ranking
- ITF = ITF entry
- JE = Junior exempt
- w/o = Walkover
- r = Retired
- d = Defaulted
- SR = Special ranking

=== Finals ===
Semifinals
(United States) Jay Berger	3	4
12	(France) Yannick Noah	6	6
4	(United States) Jimmy Connors	2	4
7	(Czechoslovakia) Miloslav Mečíř	6	6

Final
12	(France) Yannick Noah	6	6	1	2	3
7	(Czechoslovakia) Miloslav Mečíř	3	2	6	6	6

=== Top half ===
==== Section 1 ====
First round
WC	(South Africa) D Visser	3	6	6
(Brazil) L Mattar	6	3	1
WC	(United States) J Pugh	4	6	2
(United States) J Berger	6	4	6
(United States) D Rostagno	6	3	3
15	(Ecuador) A Gómez	0	6	6
10	(United States) B Gilbert	6	6
(Sweden) J Gunnarsson	4	1
(Australia) D Cahill	3	6	6
Q	(Peru) J Yzaga	6	3	1
(Australia) W Masur	4	2
(Argentina) A Mancini	6	6

Second round
1	(West Germany) B Becker	6	6
WC	(South Africa) D Visser	3	4
(United States) J Berger	6	6
15	(Ecuador) A Gómez	2	4
10	(United States) B Gilbert	6	6
(Australia) D Cahill	4	4
(Argentina) A Mancini	6	6	7
8	(Austria) T Muster	7	3	5

Third round
1	(West Germany) B Becker	1	1
(United States) J Berger	6	6
10	(United States) B Gilbert	7	7
(Argentina) A Mancini	6	6

Quarterfinals
(United States) J Berger	6	6
10	(United States) B Gilbert	4	4

==== Section 2 ====
First round
(United States) L Duncan	1	2
(South Africa) C van Rensburg	6	6
(Socialist Federal Republic of Yugoslavia) S Živojinović	5	3
(United States) R Seguso	7	6
(United States) J Courier	6	6	3
14	(United States) K Curren	7	4	6
12	(France) Y Noah	7	6
Q	(Venezuela) N Pereira	6	3
(Spain) J Sánchez	6	6
(Argentina) H de la Peña	2	3
(Argentina) M Jaite	7	4	6
(Israel) A Mansdorf	6	6	7

Second round
3	(United States) A Agassi	2	6	6
(South Africa) C van Rensburg	6	1	2
(United States) R Seguso	4	6	6
14	(United States) K Curren	6	4	3
12	(France) Y Noah	6	6
(Spain) J Sánchez	1	2
(Israel) A Mansdorf	3	5
5	(Switzerland) J Hlasek	6	7

Third round
3	(United States) A Agassi	5	6	2
(United States) R Seguso	7	4	0^{d}
12	(France) Y Noah	5	7	6
5	(Switzerland) J Hlasek	7	6	3

Quarterfinals
3	(United States) A Agassi	5	4
12	(France) Y Noah	7	6

=== Bottom half ===
==== Section 3 ====
First round
Q	(Socialist Federal Republic of Yugoslavia) G Ivanišević	5	3
(United States) D Pate	7	6
(Mexico) L Lavalle	3	2
(France) G Forget	6	6
(United States) D Goldie	6	1
11	(Spain) E Sánchez	7	6
13	(Soviet Union) A Chesnokov	3	6	6
(India) R Krishnan	6	4	1
Q	(United States) S Davis	4	4
Q	(United States) J Canter	6	6
WC	(United States) J Arias	6	1	6
(United States) J Kriek	3	6	2

Second round
6	(United States) T Mayotte	6	7
(United States) D Pate	4	6
(France) G Forget	4	4
11	(Spain) E Sánchez	6	6
13	(Soviet Union) A Chesnokov	6	6	6
Q	(United States) J Canter	4	7	3
WC	(United States) J Arias	1	1
4	(United States) J Connors	6	6

Third round
6	(United States) T Mayotte	7	6
11	(Spain) E Sánchez	5	2
13	(Soviet Union) A Chesnokov	5	5
4	(United States) J Connors	7	7

Quarterfinals
6	(United States) T Mayotte	3	3
4	(United States) J Connors	6	6

==== Section 4 ====
First round
Q	(United States) G Holmes	7	3	4
(Australia) M Woodforde	6	6	6
(United States) P Annacone	0	4
(Sweden) A Järryd	6	6
WC	(United States) P Sampras	5	7	7
9	(United States) A Krickstein	7	6	6
16	(United States) M Chang	6	7
(Soviet Union) A Volkov	4	5
WC	(United States) S Bryan	3	6	6
Q	(United States) B Pearce	6	4	2
(Austria) H Skoff	6	6
(Socialist Federal Republic of Yugoslavia) B Orešar	4	1

Second round
7	(Czechoslovakia) M Mečíř	3	6	6
(Australia) M Woodforde	6	3	1
(Sweden) A Järryd	5	2
WC	(United States) P Sampras	7	6
16	(United States) M Chang	6	6
WC	(United States) S Bryan	3	4
(Austria) H Skoff	4	4
2	(Sweden) S Edberg	6	6

Third round
7	(Czechoslovakia) M Mečíř	6	6
WC	(United States) P Sampras	0	1
16	(United States) M Chang	6	6
2	(Sweden) S Edberg	3	2

Quarterfinals
7	(Czechoslovakia) M Mečíř	6	3	6
16	(United States) M Chang	2	6	4
