= 1990 Newsweek Champions Cup – Doubles =

Doubles
- 1990 Newsweek Champions Cup

Final
- Champions: (West Germany) Boris Becker (France) Guy Forget
- Runners-up: (United States) Jim Grabb (United States) Patrick McEnroe
- Score: 4–6, 6–4, 6–3

Events
Singles	Doubles
← 1989 ·	Newsweek Champions Cup	· 1991 →

Boris Becker and Jakob Hlasek were the defending champions, but Hlasek did not participate this year. Becker partnered Guy Forget, and they won the title, defeating Jim Grabb and Patrick McEnroe 4–6, 6–4, 6–3 in the final.

== Seeds ==
The top four seeded teams received byes into the second round.

1. (South Africa) Pieter Aldrich / (South Africa) Danie Visser (second round)
2. (United States) Rick Leach / (United States) Jim Pugh (semifinals)
3. (United States) Jim Grabb / (United States) Patrick McEnroe (final)
4. (United States) Scott Davis / (United States) David Pate (quarterfinals)
5. (United States) Kevin Curren / (South Africa) Christo van Rensburg (second round)
6. (United States) Paul Annacone / (United States) Ken Flach (second round)
7. (Canada) Grant Connell / (Canada) Glenn Michibata (second round)
8. (Australia) Darren Cahill / (Australia) Mark Kratzmann (second round)

== Draw ==
=== Key ===
- Q = Qualifier
- WC = Wild card
- LL = Lucky loser
- Alt = Alternate
- SE = Special exempt
- PR = Protected ranking
- ITF = ITF entry
- JE = Junior exempt
- w/o = Walkover
- r = Retired
- d = Defaulted
- SR = Special ranking

=== Finals ===
Semifinals
(United Kingdom) Neil Broad (South Africa) Gary Muller	6^{3}	6	4
(West Germany) Boris Becker (France) Guy Forget	7^{7}	2	6
3	(United States) Jim Grabb (United States) Patrick McEnroe	6	3	6
2	(United States) Rick Leach (United States) Jim Pugh	2	6	3

Final
(West Germany) Boris Becker (France) Guy Forget	4	6	6
3	(United States) Jim Grabb (United States) Patrick McEnroe	6	4	3

=== Top half ===
First round
(Socialist Federal Republic of Yugoslavia) G Ivanišević (Czechoslovakia) P Korda	7	6^{5}	1
(United Kingdom) N Broad (South Africa) G Muller	5	7^{7}	6
(Ecuador) A Gómez (Socialist Federal Republic of Yugoslavia) S Živojinović	6	6
Q	(United States) S DeVries (United States) S Warner	4	3
(Spain) S Casal (Spain) E Sánchez	2	6^{2}
8	(Australia) D Cahill (Australia) M Kratzmann	6	7^{7}
WC	(Australia) B Dyke (Australia) W Masur	6	7
(Sweden) S Edberg (United States) T Pawsat	3	5
(West Germany) B Becker (France) G Forget	6
(United States) J Courier (United States) P Sampras	0	r
(Mexico) J Lozano (United States) T Witsken	1	2
6	(United States) P Annacone (United States) K Flach	6	6

Second round
1	(South Africa) P Aldrich (South Africa) D Visser	6^{4}	7^{7}	2
(United Kingdom) N Broad (South Africa) G Muller	7^{7}	6^{2}	7
(Ecuador) A Gómez (Socialist Federal Republic of Yugoslavia) S Živojinović	6	6
8	(Australia) D Cahill (Australia) M Kratzmann	4	4
4	(United States) S Davis (United States) D Pate	6	6^{4}	6
WC	(Australia) B Dyke (Australia) W Masur	4	7^{7}	3
(West Germany) B Becker (France) G Forget	6	6
6	(United States) P Annacone (United States) K Flach	3	2

Quarterfinals
(United Kingdom) N Broad (South Africa) G Muller	7	6^{4}	6
(Ecuador) A Gómez (Socialist Federal Republic of Yugoslavia) S Živojinović	5	7^{7}	4
4	(United States) S Davis (United States) D Pate	7^{7}	2	3
(West Germany) B Becker (France) G Forget	6^{4}	6	6

Semifinals
(United Kingdom) N Broad (South Africa) G Muller	6^{3}	6	4
(West Germany) B Becker (France) G Forget	7^{7}	2	6

=== Bottom half ===
First round
5	(United States) K Curren (South Africa) C van Rensburg	5	7^{7}	6
Q	(United States) S Cannon (United States) G Van Emburgh	7	6^{4}	1
(United States) K Jones (United States) R Van't Hof	6	6
(France) J-P Fleurian (Brazil) C Motta	3	4
(United States) C Beckman (United States) L Jensen	3	7^{7}	6
(Spain) J Sánchez (Hungary) B Taróczy	6	6^{3}	2
7	(Canada) G Connell (Canada) G Michibata	6	6
WC	(Argentina) H de la Peña (Australia) A Emerson	3	4
(Sweden) J Gunnarsson (Australia) L Warder	3	2
(United States) P Galbraith (Australia) D Macpherson	6	6
(United States) P Chamberlin (United States) R Reneberg	6	4	5
WC	(Zimbabwe) B Black (United States) K Seton	3	6	7

Second round
5	(United States) K Curren (South Africa) C van Rensburg	3	4
(United States) K Jones (United States) R Van't Hof	6	6
(United States) C Beckman (United States) L Jensen	4	3
3	(United States) J Grabb (United States) P McEnroe	6	6
7	(Canada) G Connell (Canada) G Michibata	6	3	6^{4}
(United States) P Galbraith (Australia) D Macpherson	2	6	7^{7}
WC	(Zimbabwe) B Black (United States) K Seton
2	(United States) R Leach (United States) J Pugh	DEF

Quarterfinals
(United States) K Jones (United States) R Van't Hof	4	3
3	(United States) J Grabb (United States) P McEnroe	6	6
(United States) P Galbraith (Australia) D Macpherson	5	6	4
2	(United States) R Leach (United States) J Pugh	7	3	6

Semifinals
3	(United States) J Grabb (United States) P McEnroe	6	3	6
2	(United States) R Leach (United States) J Pugh	2	6	3
