= 1990 Newsweek Champions Cup – Singles =

Singles
- 1990 Newsweek Champions Cup

Final
- Champion: (Sweden) Stefan Edberg
- Runner-up: (United States) Andre Agassi
- Score: 6–4, 5–7, 7–6^{(7–1)}, 7–6^{(8–6)}

Events
Singles	Doubles
← 1989 ·	Newsweek Champions Cup	· 1991 →

Stefan Edberg defeated Andre Agassi in the final, 6–4, 5–7, 7–6^{(7–1)}, 7–6^{(8–6)} to win the men's singles tennis title at the 1990 Indian Wells Masters.

Miloslav Mečíř was the defending champion, but lost in the first round to Richey Reneberg.

== Seeds ==
The top eight seeds received a bye into the second round.

1. (West Germany) Boris Becker (semifinals)
2. (Sweden) Stefan Edberg (champion)
3. (United States) Brad Gilbert (third round)
4. (United States) Aaron Krickstein (quarterfinals)
5. (United States) ~~Michael Chang~~ (withdrew)
6. (United States) Andre Agassi (final)
7. (United States) Tim Mayotte (second round)
8. (United States) Jay Berger (quarterfinals)
9. (Sweden) Mats Wilander (first round)
10. (Argentina) Martín Jaite (first round)
11. (Argentina) Alberto Mancini (first round)
12. (Ecuador) Andrés Gómez (first round)
13. (United States) Pete Sampras (second round)
14. (Spain) Emilio Sánchez (quarterfinals)
15. (Soviet Union) Andrei Chesnokov (first round)
16. (Austria) Horst Skoff (third round)

== Draw ==
=== Key ===
- Q = Qualifier
- WC = Wild card
- LL = Lucky loser
- Alt = Alternate
- SE = Special exempt
- PR = Protected ranking
- ITF = ITF entry
- JE = Junior exempt
- w/o = Walkover
- r = Retired
- d = Defaulted
- SR = Special ranking

=== Finals ===
Quarterfinals
1	(West Germany) Boris Becker	6	6
8	(United States) Jay Berger	1	2
14	(Spain) Emilio Sánchez	1	6^{3}
6	(United States) Andre Agassi	6	7^{7}
(United States) Jim Courier	6	7^{7}
4	(United States) Aaron Krickstein	2	6^{2}
(Sweden) Jan Gunnarsson	2	2
2/WC	(Sweden) Stefan Edberg	6	6

Semifinals
1	(West Germany) Boris Becker	4	1
6	(United States) Andre Agassi	6	6
(United States) Jim Courier	4	1
2/WC	(Sweden) Stefan Edberg	6	6

Final
6	(United States) Andre Agassi	4	7	6^{1}	6^{6}
2/WC	(Sweden) Stefan Edberg	6	5	7^{7}	7^{8}

=== Top half ===
==== Section 1 ====
First round
(United States) J Grabb	1	2
(Spain) J Sánchez	6	6
(Australia) W Masur	2	3
(France) J-P Fleurian	6	6
Q	(Sweden) R Bergh	6	3	5
16	(Austria) H Skoff	4	6	7
10	(Argentina) M Jaite	1	4
(Socialist Federal Republic of Yugoslavia) G Ivanišević	6	6
(Czechoslovakia) K Nováček	5	2
Q	(Spain) F Clavet	7	6
(France) G Forget	6	7^{7}
Q	(United States) D Pate	2	6^{5}

Second round
1	(West Germany) B Becker	7^{7}	6
(Spain) J Sánchez	6^{4}	3
(France) J-P Fleurian	3	3
16	(Austria) H Skoff	6	6
(Socialist Federal Republic of Yugoslavia) G Ivanišević	6	6
Q	(Spain) F Clavet	2	4
(France) G Forget	2	5
8	(United States) J Berger	6	7

Third round
1	(West Germany) B Becker	6	1	7^{11}
16	(Austria) H Skoff	4	6	6^{9}
(Socialist Federal Republic of Yugoslavia) G Ivanišević	4	6^{2}
8	(United States) J Berger	6	7^{7}

Quarterfinals
1	(West Germany) B Becker	6	6
8	(United States) J Berger	1	2

==== Section 2 ====
First round
(United States) P Chamberlin	5	2
(Sweden) N Kroon	7	6
(Uruguay) M Filippini	6	4	5
WC	(Japan) S Matsuoka	1	6	7
(United States) P Annacone	3	6	2
14	(Spain) E Sánchez	6	3	6
11	(Argentina) A Mancini	4	1
(Netherlands) M Schapers	6	6
(United States) K Curren	6	6
(Haiti) R Agénor	3	4
(United States) J Arias	0	7^{7}	6
WC	(South Africa) D Visser	6	6^{4}	4

Second round
3	(United States) B Gilbert	6	6
(Sweden) N Kroon	4	2
WC	(Japan) S Matsuoka	0	3
14	(Spain) E Sánchez	6	6
(Netherlands) M Schapers	7^{7}	6
(United States) K Curren	6^{2}	4
(United States) J Arias	1	6^{5}
6	(United States) A Agassi	6	7^{7}

Third round
3	(United States) B Gilbert	3	3
14	(Spain) E Sánchez	6	6
(Netherlands) M Schapers	4	5
6	(United States) A Agassi	6	7

Quarterfinals
14	(Spain) E Sánchez	1	6^{3}
6	(United States) A Agassi	6	7^{7}

=== Bottom half ===
==== Section 3 ====
First round
(United States) J Courier	7	6
WC	(United States) S Bryan	5	1
(Spain) J Arrese	1	3
(South Africa) C van Rensburg	6	6
(Australia) D Cahill	7	6
12	(Ecuador) A Gómez	5	4
13	(United States) P Sampras	6	6
Q	(India) R Krishnan	3	2
(United States) R Reneberg	5	6	6
(Czechoslovakia) M Mečíř	7	3	3
Q	(Australia) B Dyke	4	6	6
(United States) L Duncan	6	1	2

Second round
LL	(United States) K Jones	2	3
(United States) J Courier	6	6
(South Africa) C van Rensburg	1	3
(Australia) D Cahill	6	6
13	(United States) P Sampras	6	4	2
(United States) R Reneberg	4	6	6
Q	(Australia) B Dyke	6	3	2
4	(United States) A Krickstein	4	6	6

Third round
(United States) J Courier	6	6
(Australia) D Cahill	4	2
(United States) R Reneberg	2	4
4	(United States) A Krickstein	6	6

Quarterfinals
(United States) J Courier	6	7^{7}
4	(United States) A Krickstein	2	6^{2}

==== Section 4 ====
First round
(United States) J Pugh	4	6	7^{14}
(Soviet Union) A Volkov	6	2	6^{12}
Q	(United States) K Flach	6	6
(United States) T Witsken	2	3
(Sweden) J Gunnarsson	7^{7}	6
9	(Sweden) M Wilander	6^{4}	4
15	(Soviet Union) A Chesnokov	4	6	4
Q	(United States) B Pearce	6	3	6
(Peru) J Yzaga	6^{6}	2
(Spain) S Bruguera	7^{8}	6
WC	(United States) S Davis	6	6
(Spain) J Aguilera	2	4

Second round
7	(United States) T Mayotte	2	6	4
(United States) J Pugh	6	4	6
Q	(United States) K Flach	6	3	2
(Sweden) J Gunnarsson	4	6	6
Q	(United States) B Pearce	6^{3}	5
(Spain) S Bruguera	7^{7}	7
WC	(United States) S Davis	3	2
2/WC	(Sweden) S Edberg	6	6

Third round
(United States) J Pugh	3	6	0
(Sweden) J Gunnarsson	6	4	6
(Spain) S Bruguera	0	3
2/WC	(Sweden) S Edberg	6	6

Quarterfinals
(Sweden) J Gunnarsson	2	2
2/WC	(Sweden) S Edberg	6	6
