= 1976 Pacific Southwest Open – Doubles =

Doubles
- 1976 Pacific Southwest Open

Final
- Champion: (United States) Bob Lutz (United States) Stan Smith
- Runner-up: (United States) Arthur Ashe (United States) Charlie Pasarell
- Score: 6–4, 3–6, 6–4

Details
- Draw: 32
- Seeds: 8

Events
| Singles | Doubles |
| ← 1975 · | Los Angeles Open | · 1977 → |

The 1976 Pacific Southwest Open – Doubles was an event of the 1975 Pacific Southwest Open tennis tournament and was played on indoor carpet courts at the Pauley Pavilion in Los Angeles, in the United States, between September 16 and September 22, 1975. The draw comprised 32 teams of which eight were seeded. Anand Amritraj and Vijay Amritraj were the defending Pacific Southwest Open doubles champions but lost in the quarterfinals. Fifth-seeded team of Bob Lutz and Stan Smith won the title by defeating the sixth-seeded team Arthur Ashe and Charlie Pasarell in the final, 6–4, 3–6, 6–4.

== Seeds ==
1. (United States) Brian Gottfried / (Mexico) Raúl Ramírez (quarterfinals)
2. (United States) Fred McNair / (United States) Sherwood Stewart (second round)
3. (South Africa) Bob Hewitt / (Australia) Geoff Masters (semifinals)
4. (United States) Marty Riessen / (United States) Erik van Dillen (quarterfinals)
5. (United States) Bob Lutz / (United States) Stan Smith (champions)
6. (United States) Arthur Ashe / (United States) Charlie Pasarell (final)
7. (Australia) Ray Ruffels / (Australia) Allan Stone (semifinals)
8. (India) Anand Amritraj / (India) Vijay Amritraj (quarterfinals)

== Draw ==
Key

- Q = Qualifier
- WC = Wild card
- LL = Lucky loser
- Alt = Alternate
- ITF = ITF entry
- PR = Protected ranking
- SR = Special ranking
- SE = Special exempt
- JE = Junior exempt
- JR = Junior Accelerator Programme entrant
- CO = College Accelerator Programme entrant
- NG = Next Gen Accelerator Program entrant
- w/o = Walkover
- r = Retired
- d = Defaulted

=== Finals ===
Semifinals
7 | (Australia) Ray Ruffels (Australia) Allan Stone | 7 | 4 | 5
5 | (United States) Bob Lutz (United States) Stan Smith | 6 | 6 | 7
3 | (South Africa) Bob Hewitt (Australia) Geoff Masters | 4 | 6 | 4
6 | (United States) Arthur Ashe (United States) Charlie Pasarell | 6 | 3 | 6

Final
5 | (United States) Bob Lutz (United States) Stan Smith | 6 | 3 | 6
6 | (United States) Arthur Ashe (United States) Charlie Pasarell | 2 | 6 | 3

=== Top half ===
First Round
1 | (United States) Brian Gottfried (Mexico) Raúl Ramírez | 6 | 2 | 6
(Australia) Phil Dent (United States) Sandy Mayer | 3 | 6 | 3
(United States) Peter Fleming (United States) Ferdi Taygan | 2 | 6
(Argentina) Lito Álvarez (Argentina) Guillermo Vilas | 6 | 7
(Australia) Colin Dibley (South Africa) Raymond Moore | 7 | 4 | 4
(United States) Dick Stockton (United States) Roscoe Tanner | 6 | 6 | 6
(South Africa) Byron Bertram (South Africa) Pat Cramer | 3 | 6 | 5
7 | (Australia) Ray Ruffels (Australia) Allan Stone | 6 | 4 | 7
5 | (United States) Bob Lutz (United States) Stan Smith | 6 | 6
(United States) Woody Blocher (United States) George Hardie | 3 | 4
(United States) William Brown (United States) Brian Teacher | 6 | 4
(United Kingdom) John Feaver (United Kingdom) John Lloyd | 7 | 6
(United States) Jeff Austin (United States) Mike MacHette | 6 | 3 | 6
(Zimbabwe) Andrew Pattison (Pakistan) Haroon Rahim | 4 | 6 | 3
(Chile) Jaime Fillol (Chile) Álvaro Fillol | 7 | 6 | 3
4 | (United States) Marty Riessen (United States) Erik van Dillen | 6 | 7 | 6

Second Round
1 | (United States) Brian Gottfried (Mexico) Raúl Ramírez | 4 | 6 | 6
(Argentina) Lito Álvarez (Argentina) Guillermo Vilas | 6 | 4 | 1
(United States) Dick Stockton (United States) Roscoe Tanner | 4 | 6 | 6
7 | (Australia) Ray Ruffels (Australia) Allan Stone | 6 | 3 | 7
5 | (United States) Bob Lutz (United States) Stan Smith | 6 | 6
(United Kingdom) John Feaver (United Kingdom) John Lloyd | 2 | 0
(United States) Jeff Austin (United States) Mike MacHette | 3 | 4
4 | (United States) Marty Riessen (United States) Erik van Dillen | 6 | 6

Quarterfinals
1 | (United States) Brian Gottfried (Mexico) Raúl Ramírez | 6 | 4
7 | (Australia) Ray Ruffels (Australia) Allan Stone | 7 | 6
5 | (United States) Bob Lutz (United States) Stan Smith | 6 | 3 | 6
4 | (United States) Marty Riessen (United States) Erik van Dillen | 3 | 6 | 2

Semifinals
7 | (Australia) Ray Ruffels (Australia) Allan Stone | 7 | 4 | 5
5 | (United States) Bob Lutz (United States) Stan Smith | 6 | 6 | 7

=== Bottom half ===
First Round
3 | (South Africa) Bob Hewitt (Australia) Geoff Masters | 6 | 7
(Sweden) Ove Bengtson (United States) Jim McManus | 2 | 5
(United States) Dick R. Bohrnstedt (Australia) Chris Kachel | 6 | 6
(Sweden) Kjell Johansson (United States) Steve Krulevitz | 0 | 1
(United States) Tim Gullikson (United States) Tom Gullikson | 4 | 4
(United States) Mike Cahill (United States) John Whitlinger | 6 | 6
(United States) Jim Delaney (United States) Billy Martin | 6 | 2
8 | (India) Anand Amritraj (India) Vijay Amritraj | 7 | 6
6 | (United States) Arthur Ashe (United States) Charlie Pasarell | 6 | 6
(South Africa) Bernard Mitton (South Africa) John Yuill | 3 | 2
(United States) Eddie Dibbs (United States) Harold Solomon | 4 | 6 | 2
(United States) Jeff Borowiak (Romania) Ilie Năstase | 6 | 2 | 6
(United States) John Andrews (India) Sashi Menon | 7 | 6
(Australia) Syd Ball (Australia) Dick Crealy | 6 | 4
(United States) Tom Gorman (United States) Dennis Ralston | 4 | 7 | 6
2 | (United States) Fred McNair (United States) Sherwood Stewart | 6 | 5 | 7

Second Round
3 | (South Africa) Bob Hewitt (Australia) Geoff Masters | 6 | 6
(United States) Dick R. Bohrnstedt (Australia) Chris Kachel | 4 | 4
(United States) Mike Cahill (United States) John Whitlinger | 1 | 6 | 2
8 | (India) Anand Amritraj (India) Vijay Amritraj | 6 | 2 | 6
6 | (United States) Arthur Ashe (United States) Charlie Pasarell | 6 | 5 | 6
(United States) Jeff Borowiak (Romania) Ilie Năstase | 3 | 7 | 4
(United States) John Andrews (India) Sashi Menon | 6 | 5 | 7
2 | (United States) Fred McNair (United States) Sherwood Stewart | 4 | 7 | 6

Quarterfinals
3 | (South Africa) Bob Hewitt (Australia) Geoff Masters | 6 | 6
8 | (India) Anand Amritraj (India) Vijay Amritraj | 4 | 4
6 | (United States) Arthur Ashe (United States) Charlie Pasarell | 4 | 7 | 6
(United States) John Andrews (India) Sashi Menon | 6 | 5 | 4

Semifinals
3 | (South Africa) Bob Hewitt (Australia) Geoff Masters | 4 | 6 | 4
6 | (United States) Arthur Ashe (United States) Charlie Pasarell | 6 | 3 | 6
