= 1975 American Airlines Tennis Games – Singles =

Singles
- 1975 American Airlines Tennis Games

Final
- Champion: (Australia) John Alexander
- Runner-up: (Romania) Ilie Năstase
- Score: 7–5, 6–2

Details
- Draw: 64
- Seeds: 16

Events
Singles	Doubles
← 1974 ·	American Airlines Tennis Games	· 1976 →

John Newcombe was the defending champion but lost in a semifinal to fellow Aussie, John Alexander, who went on to win the final 7–5, 6–2 against Ilie Năstase.

== Seeds ==
1. (Australia) John Newcombe (semifinals)
2. (Australia) Rod Laver (quarterfinals)
3. (United States) Arthur Ashe (quarterfinals)
4. (Australia) Ken Rosewall (semifinals)
5. (Romania) Ilie Năstase (final)
6. (United States) Stan Smith (first round)
7. (United States) Marty Riessen (third round)
8. (United States) Roscoe Tanner (first round)
9. (United States) Harold Solomon (third round)
10. (Mexico) Raúl Ramírez (first round)
11. (United States) Cliff Richey (third round)
12. (Australia) John Alexander (champion)
13. (Chile) Jaime Fillol Sr (second round)
14. (United States) Erik van Dillen (second round)
15. Absent
16. (South Africa) Cliff Drysdale (third round)

== Draw ==
=== Key ===
- Q = Qualifier
- WC = Wild card
- LL = Lucky loser
- Alt = Alternate
- SE = Special exempt
- PR = Protected ranking
- ITF = ITF entry
- JE = Junior exempt
- w/o = Walkover
- r = Retired
- d = Defaulted
- SR = Special ranking

=== Finals ===
Semifinals
12	(Australia) John Alexander	6	6
1	(Australia) John Newcombe	2	2
5	(Romania) Ilie Năstase	3	7	6
4	(Australia) Ken Rosewall	6	5	2

Final
12	(Australia) John Alexander	7	6
5	(Romania) Ilie Năstase	5	2

=== Top half ===
==== Section 1 ====
First round
1	(Australia) John Newcombe	6	6
(South Africa) Bob Hewitt	2	3
(United States) Grover Raz Reid	7	7
(Australia) Ray Ruffels	6	5
(United States) Erik van Dillen	6	3	6
(Australia) B Phillips-Moore	4	6	4
14	(United States) Andrew Pattison	6	6
(Romania) Ion Țiriac	0	2
(United States) Charlie Pasarell	7	3	6
6	(United States) Stan Smith	6	6	1
(India) Anand Amritraj	7	6
(United States) Steve Krulevitz	6	3
(United States) Dennis Ralston	6	6
(United States) Mike Estep	3	2
(Australia) Bob Carmichael	6	6
(United States) Roy Barth	3	2

Second round
1	(Australia) John Newcombe	6	6
(United States) Grover Raz Reid	4	3
(United States) Erik van Dillen	3	7	6
14	(United States) Andrew Pattison	6	5	3
(United States) Charlie Pasarell	6	6
(India) Anand Amritraj	4	2
(United States) Dennis Ralston	2	1
(Australia) Bob Carmichael	6	6

Third round
1	(Australia) John Newcombe	6	6
(United States) Erik van Dillen	3	4
(United States) Charlie Pasarell	6	3
(Australia) Bob Carmichael	7	6

Quarterfinals
1	(Australia) John Newcombe	6	6
(Australia) Bob Carmichael	3	2

==== Section 2 ====
First round
3	(United States) Arthur Ashe	6	7
(Sweden) O Nils Bengtson	3	6
(Australia) Syd Ball	6	6
(United States) Fred McNair	3	4
(United States) Jeff Borowiak	6	6	7
(United States) Robert Lutz	7	2	6
9	(United States) Harold Solomon	6	6
(United States) Jim McManus	2	4
7	(United States) Marty Riessen	6	6
(United States) Tom Edlefsen	0	2
(United States) Paul Gerken	7	6
(Australia) Colin Dibley	6	1
(United Kingdom) Gerald Battrick	6	7
(United States) Robert Kreiss	4	6
12	(Australia) John Alexander	6	2	6
(South Africa) Raymond Moore	3	6	4

Second round
3	(United States) Arthur Ashe	6	6
(Australia) Syd Ball	2	2
(United States) Jeff Borowiak	4	3
9	(United States) Harold Solomon	6	6
7	(United States) Marty Riessen	6	6
(United States) Paul Gerken	1	;4
(United Kingdom) Gerald Battrick	6	1	4
12	(Australia) John Alexander	4	6	6

Third round
3	(United States) Arthur Ashe	7	6
9	(United States) Harold Solomon	5	2
7	(United States) Marty Riessen	6	2
12	(Australia) John Alexander	7	6

Quarterfinals
3	(United States) Arthur Ashe	7	4	2
12	(Australia) John Alexander	6	6	6

=== Bottom half ===
==== Section 3 ====
First round
16	(South Africa) Cliff Drysdale	7	6
(United States) Dick Dell	5	3
(United Kingdom) Mark Cox	1	6	6
(United States) William Brown	6	4	4
(India) Vijay Amritraj	6	6
(South Africa) Robert Maud	1	1
(Australia) Phil Dent	6	6	7
8	(United States) Roscoe Tanner	4	7	6
11	(United States) Cliff Richey	6	7
(South Africa) John Yuill	1	6
(Czechoslovakia) Milan Holeček	5	6	6
(Australia) Bob Giltinan	7	4	3
(Brazil) Thomaz Koch	6	6
(Australia) Ross Case	3	3
4	(Australia) Ken Rosewall	6	6
(Argentina) Julián Ganzábal	3	2

Second round
16	(South Africa) Cliff Drysdale	6	7
(United Kingdom) Mark Cox	3	6
(India) Vijay Amritraj	6	6
(Australia) Phil Dent	1	3
11	(United States) Cliff Richey	7	6
(Czechoslovakia) Milan Holeček	6	3
(Brazil) Thomaz Koch	3	5
4	(Australia) Ken Rosewall	6	7

Third round
16	(South Africa) Cliff Drysdale	6	3	4
(India) Vijay Amritraj	3	6	6
11	(United States) Cliff Richey	1	0
4	(Australia) Ken Rosewall	6	6

Quarterfinals
(India) Vijay Amritraj	7	0	6
4	(Australia) Ken Rosewall	6	6	7

==== Section 4 ====
First round
13	(Chile) Jaime Fillol Sr	6	6
(Mexico) J Loyo Mayo	3	4
(United States) John Andrews	6	4
(Mexico) Marcelo Lara	1	3R
(Egypt) Ismail El Shafei	6	3	6
(United States) Rick Fisher	2	6	3
5	(Romania) Ilie Năstase	6	6
(United States) Tom Gorman	4	3
(New Zealand) Brian Fairlie	6	6
10	(Mexico) Raúl Ramírez	2	3
(United States) Brian Gottfried	6	6
(Chile) Patricio Cornejo	2	4
(Australia) Kim Warwick	6	6
(Australia) Geoff Masters	3	4
2	(Australia) Rod Laver	6	6
(Colombia) Iván Molina	1	1

Second round
13	(Chile) Jaime Fillol Sr	3	4
(United States) John Andrews	6	6
(Egypt) Ismail El Shafei	3	2
5	(Romania) Ilie Năstase	6	6
(New Zealand) Brian Fairlie	3	0
(United States) Brian Gottfried	6	6
(Australia) Kim Warwick	4	0R
2	(Australia) Rod Laver	6	0

Third round
(United States) John Andrews	6	4
5	(Romania) Ilie Năstase	7	6
(United States) Brian Gottfried	3	4
2	(Australia) Rod Laver	6	6

Quarterfinals
5	(Romania) Ilie Năstase	6	3	6
2	(Australia) Rod Laver	3	6	2
