= 1975 American Airlines Tennis Games – Doubles =

Doubles
- 1975 American Airlines Tennis Games

Final
- Champions: (United States) William Brown (Mexico) Raúl Ramírez
- Runners-up: (South Africa) Raymond Moore (United States) Dennis Ralston
- Score: 2–6, 7–6, 6–4

Events
Singles	Doubles
← 1974 ·	American Airlines Tennis Games	· 1976 →

William Brown and Raúl Ramírez won in the final 2–6, 7–6, 6–4 against Raymond Moore and Dennis Ralston.

== Draw ==
=== Key ===
- Q = Qualifier
- WC = Wild card
- LL = Lucky loser
- Alt = Alternate
- SE = Special exempt
- PR = Protected ranking
- ITF = ITF entry
- JE = Junior exempt
- w/o = Walkover
- r = Retired
- d = Defaulted
- SR = Special ranking

=== Finals ===
Semifinals
(South Africa) Raymond Moore (United States) Dennis Ralston	6	6	7
(United Kingdom) Gerald Battrick (United States) Roscoe Tanner	3	7	6
(United States) William Brown (Mexico) Raúl Ramírez	7	6
(India) Anand Amritraj (Australia) Ray Ruffels	5	4

Final
(South Africa) Raymond Moore (United States) Dennis Ralston	6	6	4
(United States) William Brown (Mexico) Raúl Ramírez	2	7	6

=== Top half ===
First round
(Australia) Syd Ball (Australia) Ross Case
(South Africa) Raymond Moore (United States) Dennis Ralston
(Brazil) Thomaz Koch (United States) Fred Mcnair	7	6
(Argentina) Julián Ganzábal (Colombia) Iván Molina	6	3
(United States) Tom Edlefsen (Australia) B Phillips-Moore
(Chile) Patricio Cornejo (New Zealand) Brian Fairlie	6	6	6
(Australia) Bob Giltinan (South Africa) John Yuill	7	4	4
(United Kingdom) Gerald Battrick (United States) Roscoe Tanner
(Australia) Geoff Masters (Romania) Ion Țiriac	6	6
(Sweden) O Nils Bengtson (United States) Robert Lutz	3	0
(United States) Jeff Borowiak (United States) Grover Raz Reid

Second round
(Australia) Syd Ball (Australia) Ross Case	1	4
(South Africa) Raymond Moore (United States) Dennis Ralston	6	6
(Brazil) Thomaz Koch (United States) Fred Mcnair	4	3
(United States) Tom Edlefsen (Australia) B Phillips-Moore	6	6
(Chile) Patricio Cornejo (New Zealand) Brian Fairlie	3	5
(United Kingdom) Gerald Battrick (United States) Roscoe Tanner	6	7
(Australia) Geoff Masters (Romania) Ion Țiriac	7	6
(United States) Jeff Borowiak (United States) Grover Raz Reid	5	4

Quarterfinals
(South Africa) Raymond Moore (United States) Dennis Ralston	6	6	7
(United States) Tom Edlefsen (Australia) B Phillips-Moore	3	7	6
(United Kingdom) Gerald Battrick (United States) Roscoe Tanner	6	4	6
(Australia) Geoff Masters (Romania) Ion Țiriac	4	6	4

Semifinals
(South Africa) Raymond Moore (United States) Dennis Ralston	6	6	7
(United Kingdom) Gerald Battrick (United States) Roscoe Tanner	3	7	6

=== Bottom half ===
First round
(India) Anand Amritraj (Australia) Ray Ruffels	6	5	6
(Chile) Jaime Fillol Sr (Mexico) J Loyo Mayo	3	7	4
(United States) Rick Fisher (South Africa) Robert Maud
(United States) Tom Gorman (Czechoslovakia) Milan Holeček	6	5	6
(United Kingdom) Mark Cox (United States) Mike Estep	3	7	4
(Australia) Phil Dent (Australia) Colin Dibley
(United States) William Brown (Mexico) Raúl Ramírez	6	6	7
(United States) Roy Barth (United States) Stan Smith	1	7	5
(United States) Steve Krulevitz (United States) Andrew Pattison
(United States) Dick Dell (South Africa) Bob Hewitt	7	6
(Egypt) Ismail El Shafei (United States) Robert Kreiss	5	3
(United States) Paul Gerken (United States) Jim McManus

Second round
(India) Anand Amritraj (Australia) Ray Ruffels	7	6
(United States) Rick Fisher (South Africa) Robert Maud	6	1
(United States) Tom Gorman (Czechoslovakia) Milan Holeček	0	0
(Australia) Phil Dent (Australia) Colin Dibley	0	0
(United States) William Brown (Mexico) Raúl Ramírez	6	6
(United States) Steve Krulevitz (United States) Andrew Pattison	4	1
(United States) Dick Dell (South Africa) Bob Hewitt	7	7
(United States) Paul Gerken (United States) Jim McManus	6	6

Quarterfinals
(India) Anand Amritraj (Australia) Ray Ruffels	7	6
(Australia) Phil Dent (Australia) Colin Dibley	6	3
(United States) William Brown (Mexico) Raúl Ramírez	6	7
(United States) Dick Dell (South Africa) Bob Hewitt	4	6

Semifinals
(India) Anand Amritraj (Australia) Ray Ruffels	5	4
(United States) William Brown (Mexico) Raúl Ramírez	7	6
