= 1976 Pacific Southwest Open =

- Date: September 20–27
- Edition: 50th
- Category: Grand Prix (Four star)
- Draw: 64S / 32D
- Prize money: $125,000
- Surface: Carpet / Indoor
- Location: Los Angeles, California, U.S.
- Venue: Pauley Pavilion

Champions

Singles
- (United States) Brian Gottfried

Doubles
- (United States) Bob Lutz / (United States) Stan Smith
← 1975 ·	Pacific Southwest Open	· 1977 →

The 1976 Pacific Southwest Open, also known under its sponsorship name 1976 Arco–Pacific Southwest Open, was a men's tennis tournament played on indoor carpet courts at the Pauley Pavilion in Los Angeles, California in the United States. The event was part of the Grand Prix tennis circuit and categorized as four-star. It was the 50th edition of the tournament and ran from September 20 through September 27, 1976. Tenth-seeded Brian Gottfried won the singles title and $20,000 first-prize money.

== Finals ==
=== Singles ===
(United States) Brian Gottfried defeated (United States) Arthur Ashe 6–2, 6–2

- It was Gottfried's 1st singles title of the year and the 7th of his career.

=== Doubles ===
(United States) Bob Lutz / (United States) Stan Smith defeated (United States) Arthur Ashe / (United States) Charlie Pasarell 6–4, 3–6, 6–4
