= 1976 American Airlines Tennis Games – Singles =

Singles
- 1976 American Airlines Tennis Games

Final
- Champion: (United States) Jimmy Connors
- Runner-up: (United States) Roscoe Tanner
- Score: 6–4, 6–4

Details
- Draw: 64
- Seeds: 4

Events
| Singles | Doubles |
| ← 1975 · | American Airlines Tennis Games | · 1977 → |

John Alexander was the defending champion but lost in the quarterfinals to Jimmy Connors.
Connors won in the final 6–4, 6–4 against Roscoe Tanner.

== Seeds ==
1. (United States) Jimmy Connors (champion)
2. (United States) Arthur Ashe (semifinals)
3. (Sweden) Björn Borg (semifinals)
4. (Romania) Ilie Năstase (quarterfinals, defaulted)

== Draw ==
=== Key ===
- Q = Qualifier
- WC = Wild card
- LL = Lucky loser
- Alt = Alternate
- SE = Special exempt
- PR = Protected ranking
- ITF = ITF entry
- JE = Junior exempt
- w/o = Walkover
- r = Retired
- d = Defaulted
- SR = Special ranking

=== Finals ===
Semifinals
1 | (United States) Jimmy Connors | 6 | 6
3 | (Sweden) Björn Borg | 4 | 1
(United States) Roscoe Tanner | 6 | 3 | 6
2 | (United States) Arthur Ashe | 3 | 6 | 4

Final
1 | (United States) Jimmy Connors | 6 | 6
(United States) Roscoe Tanner | 4 | 4

=== Top half ===
==== Section 1 ====
First round
1 | (United States) J Connors | 6 | 6
(United States) S Mayer | 1 | 1
(United States) J Delaney | 1 | 1
(Australia) P Dent | 6 | 6
(United States) J Borowiak | 6 | 6 | 1
(United States) W Brown | 4 | 7 | 6
(United States) J Austin | 1 | 0
(United States) R Lutz | 6 | 6
(Mexico) R Ramírez | 3 | 6 | 6
(Australia) B Carmichael | 6 | 2 | 1
(United States) S Krulevitz | 3 | 6 | 6
(India) V Amritraj | 6 | 3 | 2
(Australia) J Bartlett | 1 | 1
(Australia) S Ball | 6 | 6
(Australia) A Stone | 2 | 4
(Australia) J Alexander | 6 | 6

Second round
1 | (United States) J Connors | 6 | 6
(Australia) P Dent | 1 | 0
(United States) W Brown | 3 | 5
(United States) R Lutz | 6 | 7
(Mexico) R Ramírez | 4 | 6 | 6
(United States) S Krulevitz | 6 | 4 | 0
(Australia) S Ball | 5 | 2
(Australia) J Alexander | 7 | 6

Third round
1 | (United States) J Connors | 6 | 6
(United States) R Lutz | 2 | 4
(Mexico) R Ramírez | 2 | 3
(Australia) J Alexander | 6 | 6

Quarterfinals
1 | (United States) J Connors | 6 | 6
(Australia) J Alexander | 4 | 1

==== Section 2 ====
First round
3 | (Sweden) B Borg | 6 | 6
(United States) G Hardie | 3 | 2
(Romania) I Țiriac | 6 | 6
(India) A Amritraj | 4 | 2
(United States) C Pasarell | 3 | 6 | 6
(United States) B Gottfried | 6 | 3 | 2
(United States) M Cahill | 4 | 5
(United States) S Smith | 6 | 7
(Venezuela) J Andrew | 6 | 2
(United States) M Estep | 7 | 6
(Australia) J James | 4 | 7 | 4
(United States) J McManus | 6 | 5 | 6
(Paraguay) V Pecci | 4 | 5
(United States) E van Dillen | 6 | 7
(United States) G R Reid | 6 | 3
(Australia) R Laver | 7 | 6

Second round
3 | (Sweden) B Borg | 6 | 6
(Romania) I Țiriac | 0 | 4
(United States) C Pasarell | 3 | 6 | 2
(United States) S Smith | 6 | 3 | 6
(United States) M Estep | 6 | 6
(United States) J McManus | 0 | 1
(United States) E van Dillen | 4 | 3
(Australia) R Laver | 6 | 6

Third round
3 | (Sweden) B Borg | 7 | 7
(United States) S Smith | 6 | 5
(United States) M Estep | 1 | 2
(Australia) R Laver | 6 | 6

Quarterfinals
3 | (Sweden) B Borg | 6 | 6 | 7
(Australia) R Laver | 2 | 7 | 6

=== Bottom half ===
==== Section 3 ====
First round
(Egypt) I El Shafei | 4 | 0^{r}
(New Zealand) B Fairlie | 6 | 2
(United States) M Riessen | 2 | 6 | 2
(Chile) J Fillol | 6 | 3 | 6
(Japan) J Kamiwazumi | 6 | 4
(New Zealand) O Parun | 7 | 6
(Australia) G Masters | 4 | 2
(United States) R Tanner | 6 | 6
(Rhodesia) A Pattison | 1 | 6 | 7
(South Africa) R Moore | 6 | 2 | 5
(United States) D Stockton | 7 | 4 | 7
(Australia) T Roche | 5 | 6 | 6
(Pakistan) H Rahim | 5 | 7 | 6
(United States) B Martin | 7 | 5 | 3
(South Africa) B Mitton | 3 | 2
4 | (Romania) I Năstase | 6 | 6

Second round
(New Zealand) B Fairlie | 3 | 7 | 7
(Chile) J Fillol | 6 | 5 | 5
(New Zealand) O Parun | 4 | 0
(United States) R Tanner | 6 | 6
(Rhodesia) A Pattison | 4 | 4
(United States) D Stockton | 6 | 6
(Pakistan) H Rahim | 4 | 6 | 4
4 | (Romania) I Năstase | 6 | 4 | 6

Third round
(New Zealand) B Fairlie | 3 | 3
(United States) R Tanner | 6 | 6
(United States) D Stockton | 6 | 0 | 6
4 | (Romania) I Năstase | 3 | 6 | 7

Quarterfinals
(United States) R Tanner | 6 | 3
4 | (Romania) I Năstase | 3 | 1^{d}

==== Section 4 ====
First round
(Australia) K Warwick | 6 | 6
(United States) D Ralston | 1 | 0
(Czechoslovakia) M Holeček | 6 | 6
(Australia) J Newcombe | 7 | 7
(South Africa) C Drysdale | 6 | 6
(Australia) B Giltinan | 4 | 2
(Australia) R Case | 6 | 6
(Australia) K Rosewall | 4 | 4
(Australia) R Ruffels | 3 | 6 | 2
(United States) C Richey | 6 | 4 | 6
(United States) T Gorman | 2 | 2
(United States) H Solomon | 6 | 6
(Australia) C Dibley | 4 | 4
(United States) S Stewart | 6 | 6
(United States) J Andrews | 2 | 6 | 2
2 | (United States) A Ashe | 6 | 2 | 6

Second round
(Australia) K Warwick | 7 | 3 | 2
(Australia) J Newcombe | 5 | 6 | 6
(South Africa) C Drysdale | 6 | 6
(Australia) R Case | 4 | 1
(United States) C Richey | 6 | 6
(United States) H Solomon | 4 | 3
(United States) S Stewart | 4 | 2
2 | (United States) A Ashe | 6 | 6

Third round
(Australia) J Newcombe | 6 | 7
(South Africa) C Drysdale | 2 | 6
(United States) C Richey | 3 | 4
2 | (United States) A Ashe | 6 | 6

Quarterfinals
(Australia) J Newcombe | 6 | 6 | 4
2 | (United States) A Ashe | 7 | 4 | 6
