= 1975 Pacific Southwest Open – Doubles =

Doubles
- 1975 Pacific Southwest Open

Final
- Champion: (India) Anand Amritraj (India) Vijay Amritraj
- Runner-up: (South Africa) Cliff Drysdale (United States) Marty Riessen
- Score: 7–6^{(7–3)}, 4–6, 6–4

Details
- Draw: 32
- Seeds: 8

Events
Singles	Doubles
← 1974 ·	Los Angeles Open	· 1976 →

The 1975 Pacific Southwest Open – Doubles was an event of the 1975 Pacific Southwest Open tennis tournament and was played on indoor carpet courts at the Pauley Pavilion in Los Angeles, in the United States, between September 16 and September 22, 1975. The draw comprised 32 teams of which eight were seeded. Ross Case and Geoff Masters were the defending Pacific Southwest Open doubles champions but did not compete together in this edition. Fourth-seeded team of Anand Amritraj and Vijay Amritraj won the title by defeating the eighth-seeded team Cliff Drysdale and Marty Riessen in the final, 7–6^{(7–3)}, 4–6, 6–4.

== Seeds ==
1. (United States) Brian Gottfried / (Mexico) Raúl Ramírez (second round)
2. (United States) Dick Stockton / (United States) Erik van Dillen (semifinals)
3. (United States) Charlie Pasarell / (United States) Roscoe Tanner (quarterfinals)
4. (India) Anand Amritraj / (India) Vijay Amritraj (champions)
5. (United States) Fred McNair / (United States) Sherwood Stewart (second round)
6. (United States) John Andrews / (United States) Mike Estep (first round)
7. (United States) Arthur Ashe / (United States) Dennis Ralston (quarterfinals)
8. (South Africa) Cliff Drysdale / (United States) Marty Riessen (final)

== Draw ==
=== Key ===
- Q = Qualifier
- WC = Wild card
- LL = Lucky loser
- Alt = Alternate
- ITF = ITF entry
- PR = Protected ranking
- SR = Special ranking
- SE = Special exempt
- JE = Junior exempt
- JR = Junior Accelerator Programme entrant
- CO = College Accelerator Programme entrant
- NG = Next Gen Accelerator Program entrant
- w/o = Walkover
- r = Retired
- d = Defaulted

=== Finals ===
Semifinals
(United States) Dick Dell (United States) Billy Martin	1	2
4	(India) Anand Amritraj (India) Vijay Amritraj	6	6
8	(South Africa) Cliff Drysdale (United States) Marty Riessen	7	6	7
2	(United States) Dick Stockton (United States) Erik van Dillen	6	7	5

Final
4	(India) Anand Amritraj (India) Vijay Amritraj	7	4	6
8	(South Africa) Cliff Drysdale (United States) Marty Riessen	6	6	4

=== Top half ===
First Round
1	(United States) Brian Gottfried (Mexico) Raúl Ramírez	w/o
(Sweden) Tenny Svensson (Netherlands) Rolf Thung
(Australia) Steve Docherty (Brazil) João Soares
(United States) Dick Dell (United States) Billy Martin	w/o
(South Africa) Byron Bertram (South Africa) Bernard Mitton	6	6
(United States) Jim Delaney (United States) George Hardie	4	4
(United States) Mike Cahill (United States) John Holladay	4	3
7	(United States) Arthur Ashe (United States) Dennis Ralston	6	6
4	(India) Anand Amritraj (India) Vijay Amritraj	6	6
(Australia) Dick Crealy (United States) Cliff Richey	3	2
(United States) Bruce Manson (United States) Harold Solomon	3	4
(United States) Pancho Gonzales (United States) Alex Olmedo	6	6
(Australia) Allan Stone (Australia) Kim Warwick	6	6
(Australia) Colin Dibley (United States) Jim McManus	3	4
(Australia) Barry Phillips-Moore (United States) Raz Reid	1	2
5	(United States) Fred McNair (United States) Sherwood Stewart	6	6

Second Round
1	(United States) Brian Gottfried (Mexico) Raúl Ramírez	4	4
(United States) Dick Dell (United States) Billy Martin	6	6
(South Africa) Byron Bertram (South Africa) Bernard Mitton	7	2	3
7	(United States) Arthur Ashe (United States) Dennis Ralston	6	6	6
4	(India) Anand Amritraj (India) Vijay Amritraj	6	6
(United States) Pancho Gonzales (United States) Alex Olmedo	4	4
(Australia) Allan Stone (Australia) Kim Warwick	4	6	6
5	(United States) Fred McNair (United States) Sherwood Stewart	6	2	3

Quarterfinals
(United States) Dick Dell (United States) Billy Martin	6	7	6
7	(United States) Arthur Ashe (United States) Dennis Ralston	7	6	2
4	(India) Anand Amritraj (India) Vijay Amritraj	6	5	6
(Australia) Allan Stone (Australia) Kim Warwick	4	7	3

Semifinals
(United States) Dick Dell (United States) Billy Martin	1	2
4	(India) Anand Amritraj (India) Vijay Amritraj	6	6

=== Bottom half ===
First Round
8	(South Africa) Cliff Drysdale (United States) Marty Riessen	7	6
(United States) Robert Kreiss (India) Sashi Menon	5	2
(United States) Woody Blocher (United States) Dick R. Bohrnstedt	4	2
(United States) Tom Gorman (United States) Bob Lutz	6	6
(South Africa) Ray Moore (New Zealand) Onny Parun	6	6
(Bolivia) Ramiro Benavides (Mexico) Joaquín Loyo-Mayo	1	4
(United States) Jeff Austin (United States) Steve Krulevitz	6	6
3	(United States) Charlie Pasarell (United States) Roscoe Tanner	7	7
6	(United States) John Andrews (United States) Mike Estep	7	5	5
(United States) Peter Fleming (United States) Brian Teacher	5	7	7
(United States) Tim Gullikson (United States) Mike MacHette	3	4
(Australia) Bob Carmichael (Australia) Geoff Masters	6	6
(United States) Jeff Borowiak (Pakistan) Haroon Rahim	7	6
(Argentina) Lito Álvarez (Brazil) Carlos Kirmayr	5	3
(United States) William Brown (United Kingdom) Graham Stilwell	6	3	3
2	(United States) Dick Stockton (United States) Erik van Dillen	3	6	6

Second Round
8	(South Africa) Cliff Drysdale (United States) Marty Riessen	6	3	6
(United States) Tom Gorman (United States) Bob Lutz	4	6	3
(South Africa) Raymond Moore (New Zealand) Onny Parun	3	3
3	(United States) Charlie Pasarell (United States) Roscoe Tanner	6	6
(United States) Peter Fleming (United States) Brian Teacher	1	7	6
(Australia) Bob Carmichael (Australia) Geoff Masters	6	6	2
(United States) Jeff Borowiak (Pakistan) Haroon Rahim	3	6
2	(United States) Dick Stockton (United States) Erik van Dillen	6	7

Quarterfinals
8	(South Africa) Cliff Drysdale (United States) Marty Riessen	6	3	7
3	(United States) Charlie Pasarell (United States) Roscoe Tanner	3	6	6
(United States) Peter Fleming (United States) Brian Teacher	6	5
2	(United States) Dick Stockton (United States) Erik van Dillen	7	7

Semifinals
8	(South Africa) Cliff Drysdale (United States) Marty Riessen	7	6	7
2	(United States) Dick Stockton (United States) Erik van Dillen	6	7	5
