= 1976 Pacific Southwest Open – Singles =

Singles
- 1976 Pacific Southwest Open

Final
- Champion: (United States) Brian Gottfried
- Runner-up: (United States) Arthur Ashe
- Score: 6–2, 6–2

Details
- Draw: 64
- Seeds: 16

Events
Singles	Doubles
← 1975 ·	Los Angeles Open	· 1977 →

The 1976 Pacific Southwest Open – Singles was an event of the 1976 Pacific Southwest Open tennis tournament and was played on indoor carpet courts at the Pauley Pavilion in Los Angeles, in the United States, between September 20 and September 27, 1976. The draw comprised 64 players of which 16 were seeded. Tenth-seeded Brian Gottfried won the Pacific Southwest Open singles title by defeating defending champion Arthur Ashe in the final, 6–2, 6–2.

== Seeds ==
1. (United States) Jimmy Connors (quarterfinals)
2. (Argentina) Guillermo Vilas (third round)
3. (Romania) Ilie Năstase (semifinals)
4. (United States) Arthur Ashe (final)
5. (Mexico) Raúl Ramírez (Semifinals)
6. (United States) Eddie Dibbs (third round)
7. (United States) Harold Solomon (First round)
8. (United States) Roscoe Tanner (second round)
9. (United States) Stan Smith (third round)
10. (United States) Brian Gottfried (champion)
11. (United States) Dick Stockton (quarterfinals)
12. (United States) Bob Lutz (first round)
13. (Chile) Jaime Fillol (first round)
14. (New Zealand) Onny Parun (first round)
15. (India) Vijay Amritraj (second round)
16. (United States) Sandy Mayer (quarterfinals)

Click on the seed number of a player to go to their draw section.

== Draw ==
=== Key ===
- Q = Qualifier
- WC = Wild card
- LL = Lucky loser
- Alt = Alternate
- ITF = ITF entry
- PR = Protected ranking
- SR = Special ranking
- SE = Special exempt
- JE = Junior exempt
- JR = Junior Accelerator Programme entrant
- CO = College Accelerator Programme entrant
- NG = Next Gen Accelerator Program entrant
- w/o = Walkover
- r = Retired
- d = Defaulted

=== Finals ===
Quarterfinals
1	(United States) Jimmy Connors	6^{r}
10	(United States) Brian Gottfried	6
3	(Romania) Ilie Năstase	6	6
11	(United States) Dick Stockton	1	4
(United Kingdom) John Lloyd	4	6	2
4	(United States) Arthur Ashe	6	4	6
5	(Mexico) Raúl Ramírez	6	6
16	(United States) Sandy Mayer	4	3

Semifinals
10	(United States) Brian Gottfried	6	6
3	(Romania) Ilie Năstase	2	2
4	(United States) Arthur Ashe	6	6
5	(Mexico) Raúl Ramírez	3	3

Final
10	(United States) Brian Gottfried	6	6
4	(United States) Arthur Ashe	2	2

=== Top half ===
==== Section 1 ====
First Round
1	(United States) Jimmy Connors	6	6
(United States) Trey Waltke	4	2
(Australia) Ray Ruffels	3	6	4
(Australia) Geoff Masters	6	1	6
15	(India) Vijay Amritraj	4	6	6
(United States) John Whitlinger	6	1	4
(Australia) Colin Dibley	6	6	7
(United States) Jeff Borowiak	4	7	5
6	(United States) Eddie Dibbs	6	7
(Zimbabwe) Andrew Pattison	4	6
(United States) Gene Stuart Malin	w/o
(South Africa) Bernard Mitton
10	(United States) Brian Gottfried	6	6
(United States) Van Winitsky	4	4
Q	(United States) John Holladay	2	3
(United States) Sherwood Stewart	6	6

Second Round
1	(United States) Jimmy Connors	6	7
(Australia) Geoff Masters	1	6
15	(India) Vijay Amritraj	4	2
(Australia) Colin Dibley	6	6
6	(United States) Eddie Dibbs	6	6
(United States) Gene Stuart Malin	3	3
10	(United States) Brian Gottfried	6	6
(United States) Sherwood Stewart	1	4

Third Round
1	(United States) Jimmy Connors	6	6
(Australia) Colin Dibley	3	2
6	(United States) Eddie Dibbs	3	1
10	(United States) Brian Gottfried	6	6

Quarterfinals
1	(United States) Jimmy Connors	6^{r}
10	(United States) Brian Gottfried	6

==== Section 2 ====
First Round
3	(Romania) Ilie Năstase	6	4	6
(Argentina) Elio Lito Alvarez	0	6	3
(United States) Erik van Dillen	6	1	6
Q	(United States) Tom Gullikson	3	6	7
13	(Chile) Jaime Fillol	7	6	4
(Pakistan) Haroon Rahim	6	7	6
(India) Sashi Menon	4	6
(United States) Charlie Pasarell	6	7
7	(United States) Harold Solomon	6	3	2
(United States) Fred McNair	4	6	6
(United States) Jim McManus	2	1
(United States) Marty Riessen	6	6
11	(United States) Dick Stockton	6	7
(Australia) Dick Crealy	3	6
(New Zealand) Brian Fairlie	7	6
(Australia) Syd Ball	6	4

Second Round
3	(Romania) Ilie Năstase	6	6
Q	(United States) Tom Gullikson	1	2
(Pakistan) Haroon Rahim	2	4
(United States) Charlie Pasarell	6	6
(United States) Fred McNair	1^{r}
(United States) Marty Riessen	4
11	(United States) Dick Stockton	6	7
(New Zealand) Brian Fairlie	2	6

Third Round
3	(Romania) Ilie Năstase	7	6
(United States) Charlie Pasarell	6	2
(United States) Marty Riessen	4	1
11	(United States) Dick Stockton	6	6

Quarterfinals
3	(Romania) Ilie Năstase	6	6
11	(United States) Dick Stockton	1	4

=== Bottom half ===
==== Section 3 ====
First Round
Q	(United States) Dick R. Bohrnstedt	6	3
(United States) Thomas Gorman	7	6
(United States) Peter Fleming	3	7	5
9	(United States) Stan Smith	6	6	7
(United Kingdom) John Lloyd	6	6	6
(United States) Tim Gullikson	1	7	3
(South Africa) Pat Cramer	3	4
8	(United States) Roscoe Tanner	6	6
(United States) Jim Delaney	5	1
(Sweden) Ove Bengtson	7	6
(South Africa) Byron Bertram	7	6
14	(New Zealand) Onny Parun	5	3
(United States) Billy Martin	6	6
(United States) Steve Krulevitz	4	4
Q	(United States) Mike MacHette	3	2
4	(United States) Arthur Ashe	6	6

Second Round
(United States) Thomas Gorman	3	4
9	(United States) Stan Smith	6	6
(United Kingdom) John Lloyd	1	6	7
8	(United States) Roscoe Tanner	6	2	6
(Sweden) Ove Bengtson	6	6	3
(South Africa) Byron Bertram	7	1	6
(United States) Billy Martin	2	3
4	(United States) Arthur Ashe	6	6

Third Round
9	(United States) Stan Smith	4	6	4
(United Kingdom) John Lloyd	6	3	6
(South Africa) Byron Bertram	3	7	2
4	(United States) Arthur Ashe	6	6	6

Quarterfinals
(United Kingdom) John Lloyd	4	6	2
4	(United States) Arthur Ashe	6	4	6

==== Section 4 ====
First Round
Q	(United States) Bill Scanlon	6	7	7
(South Africa) Raymond Moore	7	6	6
Q	(United States) Ferdi Taygan	6	6
12	(United States) Bob Lutz	4	3
(Australia) Allan Stone	5	3
Q	(United States) Butch Walts	7	6
(Sweden) Kjell Johansson	5	6	3
5	(Mexico) Raúl Ramírez	7	3	6
(Australia) Phil Dent	7	6
(United States) Brian Teacher	5	3
(West Germany) Hans-Jürgen Pohmann	2^{r}
16	(United States) Sandy Mayer	3
Q	(United States) Henry Bunis	7	6
(South Africa) Bob Hewitt	6	3
(United States) Mike Cahill	4	2
2	(Argentina) Guillermo Vilas	6	6

Second Round
Q	(United States) Bill Scanlon	6	6
Q	(United States) Ferdi Taygan	1	1
Q	(United States) Butch Walts	2	1
5	(Mexico) Raúl Ramírez	6	6
(Australia) Phil Dent	3	0
16	(United States) Sandy Mayer	6	6
Q	(United States) Henry Bunis	3	6	4
2	(Argentina) Guillermo Vilas	6	4	6

Third Round
Q	(United States) Bill Scanlon	1	3
5	(Mexico) Raúl Ramírez	6	6
16	(United States) Sandy Mayer	6	6
2	(Argentina) Guillermo Vilas	3	4

Quarterfinals
5	(Mexico) Raúl Ramírez	6	6
16	(United States) Sandy Mayer	4	3
