= 1976 American Airlines Tennis Games – Doubles =

Doubles
- 1976 American Airlines Tennis Games

Final
- Champions: (Australia) Colin Dibley (United States) Sandy Mayer
- Runners-up: (South Africa) Raymond Moore (United States) Erik van Dillen
- Score: 6–4, 6–7, 7–6

Events
Singles	Doubles
← 1975 ·	American Airlines Tennis Games	· 1977 →

Colin Dibley and Sandy Mayer won in the final 6–4, 6–7, 7–6 against Raymond Moore and Erik van Dillen.

== Draw ==
=== Key ===
- Q = Qualifier
- WC = Wild card
- LL = Lucky loser
- Alt = Alternate
- SE = Special exempt
- PR = Protected ranking
- ITF = ITF entry
- JE = Junior exempt
- w/o = Walkover
- r = Retired
- d = Defaulted
- SR = Special ranking

=== Final ===
Semifinals
(Czechoslovakia) Milan Holeček (Paraguay) Víctor Pecci	2	2
(Australia) Colin Dibley (United States) Sandy Mayer	6	6
(New Zealand) Onny Parun (United States) Sherwood Stewart	6	3	6
(South Africa) Raymond Moore (United States) Erik van Dillen	4	6	7

Final
(Australia) Colin Dibley (United States) Sandy Mayer	6	6	7
(South Africa) Raymond Moore (United States) Erik van Dillen	4	7	6

=== Top half ===
First round
(United States) G Hardie (Australia) K Rosewall	6	7
(Japan) J Kamiwazumi (Australia) T Roche	1	6
(Venezuela) J Andrew (United States) T Gorman	6	7	4
(United States) J Andrews (Australia) J James	7	5	6
(India) V Amritraj (Pakistan) H Rahim	4	4
(Australia) B Carmichael (United States) R Reid	6	6
(India) A Amritraj (Australia) P Dent	0	4
(Australia) C Dibley (United States) S Mayer	6	6

Second round
(Czechoslovakia) M Holeček (Paraguay) V Pecci	7	1	7
(United States) G Hardie (Australia) K Rosewall	6	6	6
(United States) J Andrews (Australia) J James	5	2
(United States) W Brown (Australia) G Masters	7	6
(Chile) J Fillol (United States) J McManus	4	4
(Australia) B Carmichael (United States) R Reid	6	6
(Australia) C Dibley (United States) S Mayer	6	7
(United States) J Borowiak (South Africa) F McMillan	2	6

Quarterfinals
(Czechoslovakia) M Holeček (Paraguay) V Pecci	6	6
(United States) W Brown (Australia) G Masters	4	3
(Australia) B Carmichael (United States) R Reid	0	4
(Australia) C Dibley (United States) S Mayer	6	6

Semifinals
(Czechoslovakia) M Holeček (Paraguay) V Pecci	2	2
(Australia) C Dibley (United States) S Mayer	6	6

=== Bottom half ===
First round
(Australia) R Case (Australia) B Giltinan	1	7	7
(Australia) S Ball (South Africa) B Mitton	6	6	6
(United States) B Bartlett (United States) B Martin	2	6	1
(United States) J Delaney (United States) H Solomon	6	4	6
(United States) M Cahill (United States) C Pasarell	7	6
(United States) D Ralston (United States) M Riessen	6	3
(South Africa) R Moore (United States) E van Dillen	7	6
(United States) B Gottfried (Romania) I Țiriac	5	3

Second round
(New Zealand) O Parun (United States) S Stewart	6	6
(Australia) R Case (Australia) B Giltinan	3	4
(United States) J Delaney (United States) H Solomon	6	6	6
(Australia) R Ruffels (Australia) K Warwick	4	7	0
(United States) J Austin (Australia) A Stone	6	7
(United States) M Cahill (United States) C Pasarell	3	5
(South Africa) R Moore (United States) E van Dillen	6	6
(United States) D Dell (United States) S Krulevitz	0	2

Quarterfinals
(New Zealand) O Parun (United States) S Stewart	6	7
(United States) J Delaney (United States) H Solomon	3	6
(United States) J Austin (Australia) A Stone	3	6
(South Africa) R Moore (United States) E van Dillen	6	7

Semifinals
(New Zealand) O Parun (United States) S Stewart	6	3	6
(South Africa) R Moore (United States) E van Dillen	4	6	7
