= 1975 Pacific Southwest Open – Singles =

Singles
- 1975 Pacific Southwest Open

Final
- Champion: (United States) Arthur Ashe
- Runner-up: (United States) Roscoe Tanner
- Score: 3–6, 7–5, 6–3

Details
- Draw: 64
- Seeds: 16

Events
| Singles | Doubles |
| ← 1974 · | Los Angeles Open | · 1976 → |

The 1975 Pacific Southwest Open – Singles was an event of the 1975 Pacific Southwest Open tennis tournament and was played on indoor carpet courts at the Pauley Pavilion in Los Angeles, in the United States, between September 16 and September 22, 1975. The draw comprised 64 players of which 16 were seeded. Jimmy Connors was the defending Pacific Southwest Open singles champion but did not compete in this edition. First-seeded Arthur Ashe won the title by defeating second-seeded Roscoe Tanner in the final, 3–6, 7–5, 6–3.

== Seeds ==
1. (United States) Arthur Ashe (champion)
2. (United States) Roscoe Tanner (final)
3. (Mexico) Raúl Ramírez (semifinals)
4. (United States) Harold Solomon (semifinals)
5. (United States) Marty Riessen (quarterfinals)
6. (New Zealand) Onny Parun (third round)
7. (United States) Cliff Richey (third round)
8. (United States) Dick Stockton (quarterfinals)
9. (withdrew)
10. (United States) Brian Gottfried (Second round)
11. (United States) Bob Lutz (quarterfinals)
12. (India) Vijay Amritraj (second round)
13. (Australia) Ross Case (third round)
14. (Australia) Phil Dent (second round)
15. (Australia) Kim Warwick (third round)
16. (United States) Charlie Pasarell (first round)

Click on the seed number of a player to go to their draw section.

== Draw ==
=== Key ===
- Q = Qualifier
- WC = Wild card
- LL = Lucky loser
- Alt = Alternate
- ITF = ITF entry
- PR = Protected ranking
- SR = Special ranking
- SE = Special exempt
- JE = Junior exempt
- JR = Junior Accelerator Programme entrant
- CO = College Accelerator Programme entrant
- NG = Next Gen Accelerator Program entrant
- w/o = Walkover
- r = Retired
- d = Defaulted

=== Finals ===
Quarterfinals
1 | (United States) Arthur Ashe | 6 | 6
11 | (United States) Bob Lutz | 2 | 2
3 | (Mexico) Raúl Ramírez | 7 | 6
5 | (United States) Marty Riessen | 6 | 4
8 | (United States) Dick Stockton | 6 | 6 | 6
4 | (United States) Harold Solomon | 4 | 7 | 7
(Australia) Allan Stone | 4 | 4
2 | (United States) Roscoe Tanner | 6 | 6

Semifinals
1 | (United States) Arthur Ashe | 3 | 6 | 6
3 | (Mexico) Raúl Ramírez | 6 | 0 | 4
4 | (United States) Harold Solomon | 6 | 3
2 | (United States) Roscoe Tanner | 7 | 6

Final
1 | (United States) Arthur Ashe | 3 | 7 | 6
2 | (United States) Roscoe Tanner | 6 | 5 | 3

=== Top half ===
==== Section 1 ====
First Round
1 | (United States) Arthur Ashe | 6 | 7
(United States) Fred McNair | 3 | 5
(Australia) Geoff Masters | 6 | 5 | 6
(United States) Raz Reid | 1 | 7 | 4
15 | (Australia) Kim Warwick | 6 | 6
(Netherlands) Rolf Thung | 4 | 4
(South Africa) Raymond Moore | 6 | 6
(United States) Dick R. Bohrnstedt | 3 | 4
7 | (United States) Cliff Richey | 6 | 6
(United States) Larry Nagler | 0 | 3
(United States) Tom Gorman | 6 | 2 | 6
(United States) Robert Kreiss | 4 | 6 | 4
11 | (United States) Bob Lutz | 6 | 6
(United States) George Hardie | 1 | 2
(Australia) Bob Carmichael | 6 | 7
(Mexico) Joaquín Loyo-Mayo | 1 | 6

Second Round
1 | (United States) Arthur Ashe | 7 | 6
(Australia) Geoff Masters | 5 | 2
15 | (Australia) Kim Warwick | 6 | 7
(South Africa) Raymond Moore | 4 | 5
7 | (United States) Cliff Richey | 6 | 6
(United States) Tom Gorman | 0 | 4
11 | (United States) Bob Lutz | 7 | 6
(Australia) Bob Carmichael | 5 | 3

Third Round
1 | (United States) Arthur Ashe | 6 | 6
15 | (Australia) Kim Warwick | 2 | 4
7 | (United States) Cliff Richey | 2 | 3
11 | (United States) Bob Lutz | 6 | 6

Quarterfinals
1 | (United States) Arthur Ashe | 6 | 6
11 | (United States) Bob Lutz | 2 | 2

==== Section 2 ====
First Round
3 | (Mexico) Raúl Ramírez | 6 | 7
(United States) William Brown | 2 | 6
(United States) Brian Teacher | 4 | 6 | 6
(United States) Mike Estep | 6 | 2 | 7
13 | (Australia) Ross Case | 3 | 6 | 7
(United States) Woody Blocher | 6 | 4 | 5
(United States) Sherwood Stewart | 4 | 0
(Australia) Barry Phillips-Moore | 6 | 6
5 | (United States) Marty Riessen | 6 | 6
(Australia) Colin Dibley | 2 | 2
(United States) Erik van Dillen | 6 | 6
(Brazil) João Soares | 4 | 1
12 | (India) Vijay Amritraj | 6 | 6
(United States) Jeff Austin | 2 | 4
(United States) Jeff Borowiak | 7 | 4 | 6
(Argentina) Elio Lito Álvarez | 6 | 6 | 2

Second Round
3 | (Mexico) Raúl Ramírez | 6 | 6
(United States) Mike Estep | 3 | 0
13 | (Australia) Ross Case | 6 | 6
(Australia) Barry Phillips-Moore | 1 | 2
5 | (United States) Marty Riessen | 6 | 7
(United States) Erik van Dillen | 3 | 6
12 | (India) Vijay Amritraj | 5 | 7 | 4
(United States) Jeff Borowiak | 7 | 5 | 6

Third Round
3 | (Mexico) Raúl Ramírez | 7 | 6
13 | (Australia) Ross Case | 5 | 3
5 | (United States) Marty Riessen | 3 | 6 | 6
(United States) Jeff Borowiak | 6 | 4 | 2

Quarterfinals
3 | (Mexico) Raúl Ramírez | 7 | 6
5 | (United States) Marty Riessen | 6 | 4

=== Bottom half ===
==== Section 3 ====
First Round
8 | (United States) Dick Stockton | 6 | 3 | 6
(United States) Bruce Manson | 3 | 6 | 2
(Australia) Dick Crealy | 3 | 2
(United States) Steve Krulevitz | 6 | 6
16 | (United States) Charlie Pasarell | 6 | 6
(India) Sashi Menon | 7 | 7
(South Africa) Cliff Drysdale | 6 | 6
(United States) Peter Fleming | 3 | 4
(United States) John Holladay | 6 | 4 | 6
(United States) Jim McManus | 4 | 6 | 7
(India) Anand Amritraj | 7 | 2 | 6
(United States) Dick Dell | 6 | 6 | 2
(United States) Billy Martin | 7 | 7
(South Africa) Byron Bertram | 6 | 5
(Sweden) Tenny Svensson | 3 | 6 | 6
4 | (United States) Harold Solomon | 6 | 1 | 7

Second Round
8 | (United States) Dick Stockton | 7 | 6
(United States) Steve Krulevitz | 6 | 3
(India) Sashi Menon | 2 | 4
(South Africa) Cliff Drysdale | 6 | 6
(United States) Jim McManus | 1 | 6 | 6
(India) Anand Amritraj | 6 | 4 | 3
(United States) Billy Martin | 7 | 2 | 3
4 | (United States) Harold Solomon | 6 | 6 | 6

Third Round
8 | (United States) Dick Stockton | 6 | 6
(South Africa) Cliff Drysdale | 2 | 1
(United States) Jim McManus | 0 | 2
4 | (United States) Harold Solomon | 6 | 6

Quarterfinals
8 | (United States) Dick Stockton | 6 | 6 | 6
4 | (United States) Harold Solomon | 4 | 7 | 7

==== Section 4 ====
First Round
6 | (New Zealand) Onny Parun | 3 | 6 | 6
(Pakistan) Haroon Rahim | 6 | 3 | 4
(United States) Jim Delaney | 6 | 4 | 1
(United States) Tim Gullikson | 3 | 6 | 6
10 | (United States) Brian Gottfried | 6 | 6
(Brazil) Carlos Kirmayr | 4 | 3
(Australia) Allan Stone | 6 | 6
(Australia) Steve Docherty | 4 | 3
14 | (Australia) Phil Dent | 6 | 2 | 6
(United Kingdom) Graham Stilwell | 4 | 6 | 4
(United States) John Andrews | 6 | 7 | 6
(United States) Dennis Ralston | 7 | 5 | 1
(South Africa) Bernard Mitton | 6 | 6
(Bolivia) Ramiro Benavides | 4 | 2
(United States) Mike Cahill | 6 | 1 | 4
2 | (United States) Roscoe Tanner | 4 | 6 | 6

Second Round
6 | (New Zealand) Onny Parun | 6 | 6 | 6
(United States) Tim Gullikson | 1 | 7 | 1
10 | (United States) Brian Gottfried | 6 | 3 | 3
(Australia) Allan Stone | 2 | 6 | 6
14 | (Australia) Phil Dent | 6 | 2 | 5
(United States) John Andrews | 4 | 6 | 7
(South Africa) Bernard Mitton | 6 | 4
2 | (United States) Roscoe Tanner | 7 | 6

Third Round
6 | (New Zealand) Onny Parun | 3 | 4
(Australia) Allan Stone | 6 | 6
(United States) John Andrews | 6 | 6
2 | (United States) Roscoe Tanner | 7 | 7

Quarterfinals
(Australia) Allan Stone | 4 | 4
2 | (United States) Roscoe Tanner | 6 | 6
