= 1978 American Airlines Tennis Games – Doubles =

Doubles
- 1978 American Airlines Tennis Games

Final
- Champions: (South Africa) Raymond Moore (United States) Roscoe Tanner
- Runners-up: (South Africa) Bob Hewitt (South Africa) Frew McMillan
- Score: 6–4, 6–4

Events
Singles	Doubles
← 1977 ·	American Airlines Tennis Games	· 1979 →

Bob Hewitt and Frew McMillan were the defending champions but lost in the final 6–4, 6–4 against Raymond Moore and Roscoe Tanner.

== Seeds ==
1. (South Africa) Bob Hewitt / (South Africa) Frew McMillan (final)
2. (United States) Robert Lutz / (United States) Stan Smith (second round)
3. (Netherlands) Tom Okker / (United States) Marty Riessen (semifinals)
4. (United States) Fred McNair / (United States) Sherwood Stewart (semifinals)
5. (Australia) Ross Case / (Australia) Geoff Masters (first round)
6. (Australia) Phil Dent / (Australia) John Newcombe (quarterfinals)
7. (Mexico) Marcello Lara / (Mexico) Raúl Ramirez (quarterfinals)
8. (Australia) Colin Dibley / (United States) Sandy Mayer (quarterfinals)

== Draw ==
=== Key ===
- Q = Qualifier
- WC = Wild card
- LL = Lucky loser
- Alt = Alternate
- SE = Special exempt
- PR = Protected ranking
- ITF = ITF entry
- JE = Junior exempt
- w/o = Walkover
- r = Retired
- d = Defaulted
- SR = Special ranking

=== Final ===
Semifinals
1	(South Africa) Bob Hewitt (South Africa) Frew McMillan	6	6
4	(United States) Fred McNair (United States) Sherwood Stewart	1	4
3	(Netherlands) Tom Okker (United States) Marty Riessen	6	3	2
(South Africa) Raymond Moore (United States) Roscoe Tanner	4	6	6

Final
1	(South Africa) Bob Hewitt (South Africa) Frew McMillan	4	4
(South Africa) Raymond Moore (United States) Roscoe Tanner	6	6

=== Top half ===
First round
1	(South Africa) B Hewitt (South Africa) F McMillan	6	6
(Australia) S Docherty (United States) E Teltscher	2	2
(United States) Tim Gullikson (United States) Tom Gullikson	7	7
(Egypt) I El Shafei (New Zealand) B Fairlie	6	6
(Spain) J Higueras (Spain) M Orantes	6	6
Q	(United States) J Austin (United States) N Saviano	2	3
(United States) B Martin (United States) E van Dillen	6	6	6
7	(Mexico) M Lara (Mexico) R Ramirez	4	7	7
4	(United States) F McNair (United States) S Stewart	6	6	6
Q	(United States) J Bailey (Switzerland) H Günthardt	7	1	4
(Australia) D Crealy (Australia) O Davidson	6	6
(United States) S Krulevitz (United States) T Waltke	1	4
Q	(United States) V Winitsky (South Africa) J Yuill	6	3
(South Africa) C Drysdale (United States) H Solomon	7	6
(United States) P DuPré (India) S Menon	6	3	6
6	(Australia) P Dent (Australia) J Newcombe	2	6	7

Second round
1	(South Africa) B Hewitt (South Africa) F McMillan	6	6
(United States) Tim Gullikson (United States) Tom Gullikson	4	2
(Spain) J Higueras (Spain) M Orantes	5	6
7	(Mexico) M Lara (Mexico) R Ramirez	7	7
4	(United States) F McNair (United States) S Stewart	3	7	6
(Australia) D Crealy (Australia) O Davidson	6	6	3
(South Africa) C Drysdale (United States) H Solomon	6	5
6	(Australia) P Dent (Australia) J Newcombe	7	7

Quarterfinals
1	(South Africa) B Hewitt (South Africa) F McMillan	2	7	7
7	(Mexico) M Lara (Mexico) R Ramirez	6	6	6
4	(United States) F McNair (United States) S Stewart	6	3	6
6	(Australia) P Dent (Australia) J Newcombe	4	6	1

Semifinals
1	(South Africa) B Hewitt (South Africa) F McMillan	6	6
4	(United States) F McNair (United States) S Stewart	1	4

=== Bottom half ===
First round
5	(Australia) R Case (Australia) G Masters	5	4
(Australia) B Carmichael (United States) B Teacher	7	6
(New Zealand) C Lewis (New Zealand) R Simpson	6	6
Q	(United States) G Hardie (Australia) B Lloyd	4	3
(United States) T Moor (United States) B Walts	7	4	4
(United States) C Pasarell (Rhodesia) A Pattison	6	6	6
(United States) R Fisher (United States) J Whitlinger	4	5
3	(Netherlands) T Okker (United States) M Riessen	6	7
8	(Australia) C Dibley (United States) S Mayer	7	7
(United States) T Leonard (United States) M Machette	6	5
(United States) P Fleming (United States) B Scanlon	7	7
(Chile) A Fillol (Chile) J Fillol	6	6
(South Africa) R Moore (United States) R Tanner	7	7
(United States) A Ashe (Romania) I Nastase	5	6
(United States) B Gottfried (United States) D Ralston	7	3	4
2	(United States) R Lutz (United States) S Smith	6	6	6

Second round
(Australia) B Carmichael (United States) B Teacher	6	7
(New Zealand) C Lewis (New Zealand) R Simpson	2	6
(United States) C Pasarell (Rhodesia) A Pattison	6	4
3	(Netherlands) T Okker (United States) M Riessen	7	6
8	(Australia) C Dibley (United States) S Mayer	4	7	6
(United States) P Fleming (United States) B Scanlon	6	6	4
(South Africa) R Moore (United States) R Tanner	7	6
2	(United States) R Lutz (United States) S Smith	5	4

Quarterfinals
(Australia) B Carmichael (United States) B Teacher	7	4	4
3	(Netherlands) T Okker (United States) M Riessen	6	6	6
8	(Australia) C Dibley (United States) S Mayer	6	4
(South Africa) R Moore (United States) R Tanner	7	6

Semifinals
3	(Netherlands) T Okker (United States) M Riessen	6	3	2
(South Africa) R Moore (United States) R Tanner	4	6	6
