= 1977 American Airlines Tennis Games =

- Date: February 21–27
- Edition: 4th
- Category: Grand Prix circuit (6 star)
- Prize money: $225,000
- Surface: Hard / outdoor
- Location: Rancho Mirage, CA, United States
- Venue: Mission Hills Country Club

Champions

Singles
- (United States) Brian Gottfried

Doubles
- (South Africa) Bob Hewitt / (South Africa) Frew McMillan
← 1976 ·	Indian Wells Masters	· 1978 →

The 1977 American Airlines Tennis Games was a men's tennis tournament played on outdoor hard courts. It was the 4th edition of the Indian Wells Masters and was part of the 1977 Colgate-Palmolive Grand Prix. It was played at the Mission Hills Country Club in Rancho Mirage, California in the United States from February 21 through February 27, 1977. Brian Gottfried won the singles title.

== Finals ==
=== Singles ===
(United States) Brian Gottfried defeated (Argentina) Guillermo Vilas 2–6, 6–1, 6–3

- It was Gottfried's 3rd title of the year and the 41st of his career.

=== Doubles ===
(South Africa) Bob Hewitt / (South Africa) Frew McMillan defeated (United States) Marty Riessen / (United States) Roscoe Tanner 7–6, 7–6

- It was Hewitt's 2nd title of the year and the 32nd of his career. It was McMillan's 2nd title of the year and the 37th of his career.
