= 1978 American Airlines Tennis Games =

- Date: February 13–19
- Edition: 5th
- Category: Grand Prix
- Draw: 64S / 32D
- Prize money: $225,000
- Surface: Hard / outdoor
- Location: Rancho Mirage, CA, United States
- Venue: Mission Hills Country Club

Champions

Singles
- (United States) Roscoe Tanner

Doubles
- (South Africa) Raymond Moore / (United States) Roscoe Tanner
| ← 1977 · | Indian Wells Masters | · 1979 → |

The 1978 American Airlines Tennis Games was a men's tennis tournament played on outdoor hard courts. It was the fifth edition of the Indian Wells Masters and was part of the 1978 Colgate-Palmolive Grand Prix. The tournament was played at the Mission Hills Country Club in Rancho Mirage, California in the United States and held from February 13 through February 19, 1978. Roscoe Tanner won the singles title.

== Finals ==
=== Singles ===
(United States) Roscoe Tanner defeated (Mexico) Raúl Ramírez 6–1, 7–6

- It was Tanner's 2nd title of the year and the 24th of his career.

=== Doubles ===
(South Africa) Raymond Moore / (United States) Roscoe Tanner defeated (South Africa) Bob Hewitt / (South Africa) Frew McMillan 6–4, 6–4

- It was Moore's 1st title of the year and the 5th of his career. It was Tanner's 1st title of the year and the 23rd of his career.
