= 1977 American Airlines Tennis Games – Singles =

Singles
- 1977 American Airlines Tennis Games

Final
- Champion: (United States) Brian Gottfried
- Runner-up: (Argentina) Guillermo Vilas
- Score: 2–6, 6–1, 6–3

Details
- Draw: 64
- Seeds: 16

Events
Singles	Doubles
← 1976 ·	American Airlines Tennis Games	· 1978 →

Jimmy Connors was the defending champion but did not compete that year.

Brian Gottfried won in the final 2–6, 6–1, 6–3 against Guillermo Vilas.

== Draw ==
=== Key ===
- Q = Qualifier
- WC = Wild card
- LL = Lucky loser
- Alt = Alternate
- SE = Special exempt
- PR = Protected ranking
- ITF = ITF entry
- JE = Junior exempt
- w/o = Walkover
- r = Retired
- d = Defaulted
- SR = Special ranking

=== Finals ===
Semifinals
(United States) Bill Scanlon	6	3	1
(United States) Brian Gottfried	2	6	6
(Argentina) Guillermo Vilas	6	6
(Mexico) Raúl Ramírez	3	3

Final
(United States) Brian Gottfried	2	6	6
(Argentina) Guillermo Vilas	6	1	3

=== Top half ===
==== Section 1 ====
First round
(United States) M Machette	3	6	6
(Paraguay) V Pecci	6	4	0
(Czechoslovakia) J Hřebec	2	1
(Australia) R Case	6	6
(Australia) J Alexander	3	6	6
(Australia) R Ruffels	6	3	7
(United States) B Scanlon	6	7
(Spain) J Higueras	2	5
(United States) D Stockton	6	6
(Argentina) R Cano	3	1
(South Africa) B Mitton	6	6
(United States) R Fisher	1	2
(United Kingdom) M Cox	1	0
(Australia) P Dent	6	6
(New Zealand) O Parun	7	4	6
(United States) H Pfister	6	6	0

Second round
(United States) M Machette	7	3	4
(Australia) R Case	6	6	6
(Australia) R Ruffels	4	2
(United States) B Scanlon	6	6
(United States) D Stockton	6	3	4
(South Africa) B Mitton	3	6	6
(Australia) P Dent	6	6
(New Zealand) O Parun	3	4

Third round
(Australia) R Case	3	6
(United States) B Scanlon	6	7
(South Africa) B Mitton	3	2
(Australia) P Dent	6	6

Quarterfinals
(United States) B Scanlon	4	7	6
(Australia) P Dent	6	5	3

==== Section 2 ====
First round
(United States) R Tanner	6	6
(Australia) J James	3	4
(West Germany) K Meiler	7	7
(United States) J Delaney	6	6
(India) V Amritraj	7	6
(Australia) C Dibley	6	4
(United States) C Pasarell	6	7
(Hungary) B Taróczy	3	5
(United States) B Gottfried	6	6
(South Africa) B Bertram	2	2
(Pakistan) H Rahim	3	2
(Australia) R Laver	6	6
(United States) R Lutz	6	7
(South Africa) D Schneider	3	5
(Australia) G Masters	6	6
(United Kingdom) J Lloyd	2	3

Second round
(United States) R Tanner	6	6
(West Germany) K Meiler	3	2
(India) V Amritraj	3	0
(United States) C Pasarell	6	6
(United States) B Gottfried	4	6	6
(Australia) R Laver	6	2	2
(United States) R Lutz	7	6
(Australia) G Masters	6	3

Third round
(United States) R Tanner	7	4	4
(United States) C Pasarell	6	6	6
(United States) B Gottfried	6	7
(United States) R Lutz	3	5

Quarterfinals
(United States) C Pasarell	1	7	3
(United States) B Gottfried	6	6	6

=== Bottom half ===
==== Section 3 ====
First round
(Sweden) O N Bengtson	4	7	6
(United States) D Ralston	6	6	1
(South Africa) R Moore	6	2	3
(Chile) J Fillol	4	6	6
(United States) Z Guerry	4	7	6
(Soviet Union) A Metreveli	6	5	7
(Rhodesia) A Pattison	1	0
(United States) H Solomon	6	6
(United States) V Amaya	3	5
(Czechoslovakia) T Šmíd	6	7
(United States) B Martin	6	6
(South Africa) C Drysdale	4	1
(United States) S Krulevitz	7	6
(Netherlands) R Thung	5	2
(United States) M Riessen	4	2
(Argentina) G Vilas	6	6

Second round
(Sweden) O N Bengtson	4	4
(Chile) J Fillol	6	6
(Soviet Union) A Metreveli	6	2	1
(United States) H Solomon	4	6	6
(Czechoslovakia) T Šmíd	2	4
(United States) B Martin	6	6
(United States) S Krulevitz	2	6
(Argentina) G Vilas	6	7

Third round
(Chile) J Fillol	1	2
(United States) H Solomon	6	6
(United States) B Martin	3	3
(Argentina) G Vilas	6	6

Quarterfinals
(United States) H Solomon	4	7	3
(Argentina) G Vilas	6	6	6

==== Section 4 ====
First round
(Argentina) L Álvarez	7	5	3
(United States) P Fleming	6	7	6
(United States) T Gorman	3	6
(United States) S Smith	6	7
(United States) B Teacher	6	6
(West Germany) U Pinner	3	1
(South Africa) F McMillan	6	6
(Poland) W Fibak	4	4
(United States) F McNair	4	5
(United States) E Teltscher	6	7
(United States) G Mayer	1	1
(United States) C Richey	6	6
(Australia) S Ball	4	2
(Australia) K Warwick	6	6
(United States) B Walts	4	2
(Mexico) R Ramírez	6	6

Second round
(United States) P Fleming	2	7	6
(United States) S Smith	6	6	4
(United States) B Teacher	4	6	2
(South Africa) F McMillan	6	4	6
(United States) E Teltscher	7	6
(United States) C Richey	5	1
(Australia) K Warwick	2	1
(Mexico) R Ramírez	6	6

Third round
(United States) P Fleming	3	6	5
(South Africa) F McMillan	6	3	7
(United States) E Teltscher	4	2
(Mexico) R Ramírez	6	6

Quarterfinals
(South Africa) F McMillan	4	3
(Mexico) R Ramírez	6	6
