= 1977 American Airlines Tennis Games – Doubles =

Doubles
- 1977 American Airlines Tennis Games

Final
- Champions: (South Africa) Bob Hewitt (South Africa) Frew McMillan
- Runners-up: (United States) Marty Riessen (United States) Roscoe Tanner
- Score: 7–6, 7–6

Events
Singles	Doubles
← 1976 ·	American Airlines Tennis Games	· 1978 →

Colin Dibley and Sandy Mayer were the defending champions but only Dibley competed that year with Haroon Rahim.

Dibley and Rahim lost in the first round to Robert Lutz and Stan Smith.

Bob Hewitt and Frew McMillan won in the final 7–6, 7–6 against Marty Riessen and Roscoe Tanner.

== Seeds ==
1. (United States) Brian Gottfried / (Mexico) Raúl Ramírez (quarterfinals)
2. (South Africa) Bob Hewitt / (South Africa) Frew McMillan (champions)
3. (United States) Robert Lutz / (United States) Stan Smith (quarterfinals)
4. (United States) Fred McNair / (United States) Sherwood Stewart (first round)
5. (United States) Marty Riessen / (United States) Roscoe Tanner (final)
6. (United States) Charlie Pasarell / (United States) Erik van Dillen (semifinals)
7. (Poland) Wojciech Fibak / (United States) Dick Stockton (semifinals)
8. (Australia) Ray Ruffels / (Australia) Allan Stone (quarterfinals)

== Draw ==
=== Key ===
- Q = Qualifier
- WC = Wild card
- LL = Lucky loser
- Alt = Alternate
- SE = Special exempt
- PR = Protected ranking
- ITF = ITF entry
- JE = Junior exempt
- w/o = Walkover
- r = Retired
- d = Defaulted
- SR = Special ranking

=== Final ===
Semifinals
7	(Poland) Wojciech Fibak (United States) Dick Stockton	6	4
5	(United States) Marty Riessen (United States) Roscoe Tanner	7	6
6	(United States) Charlie Pasarell (United States) Erik van Dillen	1	7	2
2	(South Africa) Bob Hewitt (South Africa) Frew McMillan	6	6	6

Final
5	(United States) Marty Riessen (United States) Roscoe Tanner	6	6
2	(South Africa) Bob Hewitt (South Africa) Frew McMillan	7	7

=== Top half ===
First round
1	(United States) B Gottfried (Mexico) R Ramírez	6	6
(United States) H Pfister (United States) B Walts	4	2
(Soviet Union) A Metreveli (Hungary) B Taróczy	0	5
(Australia) B Carmichael (United States) C B Cox	6	7
(West Germany) K Meiler (West Germany) U Pinner	3	5
(Romania) I Țiriac (Argentina) G Vilas	6	7
(United States) C Richey (United States) H Solomon	2	0
7	(Poland) W Fibak (United States) D Stockton	6	6
3	(United States) R Lutz (United States) S Smith	3	7	6
(Australia) C Dibley (Pakistan) H Rahim	6	5	3
(United States) T Gorman (United States) D Ralston	6	4	6
(Australia) P Kronk (Australia) C Letcher	4	6	4
Q	(United States) M Estep (United States) P Fleming	7	6
Q	(Brazil) C Kirmayr (Paraguay) V Pecci	6	2
(South Africa) R Moore (New Zealand) O Parun	2	3
5	(United States) M Riessen (United States) R Tanner	6	6

Second round
1	(United States) B Gottfried (Mexico) R Ramírez	7	6
(Australia) B Carmichael (United States) C B Cox	6	1
(Romania) I Țiriac (Argentina) G Vilas	2	2
7	(Poland) W Fibak (United States) D Stockton	6	6
3	(United States) R Lutz (United States) S Smith	6	2	7
(United States) T Gorman (United States) D Ralston	3	6	5
Q	(United States) M Estep (United States) P Fleming	4	3
5	(United States) M Riessen (United States) R Tanner	6	6

Quarterfinals
1	(United States) B Gottfried (Mexico) R Ramírez	6	4
7	(Poland) W Fibak (United States) D Stockton	7	6
3	(United States) R Lutz (United States) S Smith	4	5
5	(United States) M Riessen (United States) R Tanner	6	7

Semifinals
7	(Poland) W Fibak (United States) D Stockton	6	4
5	(United States) M Riessen (United States) R Tanner	7	6

=== Bottom half ===
First round
6	(United States) C Pasarell (United States) E van Dillen	6	6	6
Q	(France) É Deblicker (Socialist Federal Republic of Yugoslavia) N Špear	1	7	1
(South Africa) B Bertram (South Africa) B Mitton	5	6
(United States) B Martin (United States) B Scanlon	7	7
(United States) J McManus (United States) J Osborne	6	4	4
(Australia) R Laver (Australia) J Newcombe	3	6	6
(Australia) S Ball (Australia) K Warwick	7	6	6
4	(United States) F McNair (United States) S Stewart	6	7	1
8	(Australia) R Ruffels (Australia) A Stone	6	7
(Australia) R Case (Australia) G Masters	3	6
(United States) J Borowiak (Rhodesia) A Pattison	4	6	3
Q	(West Germany) F Gebert (Poland) J Niedźwiedzki	6	3	6
(India) A Amritraj (India) V Amritraj	4	1
(Australia) J Alexander (South Africa) C Drysdale	6	6
(United States) J Delaney (United States) G Mayer	6	3
2	(South Africa) B Hewitt (South Africa) F McMillan	7	6

Second round
6	(United States) C Pasarell (United States) E van Dillen	6	6
(United States) B Martin (United States) B Scanlon	4	4
(Australia) R Laver (Australia) J Newcombe	6	4	7
(Australia) S Ball (Australia) K Warwick	1	6	6
8	(Australia) R Ruffels (Australia) A Stone	7	6	6
Q	(West Germany) F Gebert (Poland) J Niedźwiedzki	5	7	2
(Australia) J Alexander (South Africa) C Drysdale	2	6	3
2	(South Africa) B Hewitt (South Africa) F McMillan	6	4	6

Quarterfinals
6	(United States) C Pasarell (United States) E van Dillen	6	6
(Australia) R Laver (Australia) J Newcombe	4	4
8	(Australia) R Ruffels (Australia) A Stone	6	1
2	(South Africa) B Hewitt (South Africa) F McMillan	7	6

Semifinals
6	(United States) C Pasarell (United States) E van Dillen	1	7	2
2	(South Africa) B Hewitt (South Africa) F McMillan	6	6	6
