= 1978 American Airlines Tennis Games – Singles =

Singles
- 1978 American Airlines Tennis Games

Final
- Champion: (United States) Roscoe Tanner
- Runner-up: (Mexico) Raúl Ramirez
- Score: 6–1, 7–6

Details
- Draw: 64
- Seeds: 16

Events
Singles	Doubles
← 1977 ·	American Airlines Tennis Games	· 1979 →

Brian Gottfried was the defending champion but lost in the quarterfinals to Peter Fleming.

Roscoe Tanner won in the final 6–1, 7–6 against Raúl Ramirez.

== Seeds ==
1. (United States) Brian Gottfried (quarterfinals)
2. (United States) Eddie Dibbs (second round)
3. (Spain) Manuel Orantes (quarterfinals)
4. (Mexico) Raúl Ramirez (final)
5. (Romania) Ilie Năstase (quarterfinals)
6. (United States) Harold Solomon (third round)
7. (United States) Sandy Mayer (first round)
8. (United States) Roscoe Tanner (champion)
9. (Chile) Jaime Fillol (third round)
10. (Australia) Phil Dent (first round)
11. (United States) Stan Smith (third round)
12. (Australia) John Alexander (first round)
13. (United States) Tim Gullikson (second round)
14. (South Africa) Cliff Drysdale (second round)
15. (Spain) José Higueras (second round)
16. (Australia) John Newcombe (first round)

== Draw ==
=== Key ===
- Q = Qualifier
- WC = Wild card
- LL = Lucky loser
- Alt = Alternate
- SE = Special exempt
- PR = Protected ranking
- ITF = ITF entry
- JE = Junior exempt
- w/o = Walkover
- r = Retired
- d = Defaulted
- SR = Special ranking

=== Finals ===
Semifinals
(United States) Peter Fleming	6	6	4
4	(Mexico) Raúl Ramirez	4	7	6
8	(United States) Roscoe Tanner	6	6
(United States) Tom Leonard	3	4

Final
4	(Mexico) Raúl Ramirez	1	6
8	(United States) Roscoe Tanner	6	7

=== Top half ===
==== Section 1 ====
First round
1	(United States) B Gottfried	6	6
Q	(United States) J Osborne	3	3
Q	(India) A Amritraj	6	6
(Australia) S Docherty	2	4
(United States) P DuPré	6	6
(Australia) B Lloyd	1	1
(South Africa) F McMillan	6	2	1
11	(United States) S Smith	3	6	6
15	(Spain) J Higueras	6	6
(United States) B Scanlon	2	3
(Rhodesia) A Pattison	4	6
(United States) P Fleming	6	7
(United States) Tom Gullikson	6	7
Q	(United States) M Machette	4	5
(South Africa) R Moore	7	6
7	(United States) S Mayer	6	3

Second round
1	(United States) B Gottfried	6	6
Q	(India) A Amritraj	2	3
(United States) P DuPré	5	7	5
11	(United States) S Smith	7	6	7
15	(Spain) J Higueras	3	3
(United States) P Fleming	6	6
(United States) Tom Gullikson	5	6	6
(South Africa) R Moore	7	3	4

Third round
1	(United States) B Gottfried	3	6	6
11	(United States) S Smith	6	3	1
(United States) P Fleming	4	6	6
(United States) Tom Gullikson	6	1	3

Quarterfinals
1	(United States) B Gottfried	7	6	2
(United States) P Fleming	5	7	6

==== Section 2 ====
First round
4	(Mexico) R Ramirez	6	6
(Switzerland) H Günthardt	4	1
(United States) T Moor	6	3	1
(United States) S Stewart	2	6	6
(Mexico) M Lara	6	3	7
(Czechoslovakia) T Šmíd	4	6	5
(South Africa) B Bertram	4	2
9	(Chile) J Fillol	6	6
14	(South Africa) C Drysdale	6	6
(New Zealand) C Lewis	3	1
(United States) C Richey	6	5	6
(United States) M Harrington	3	7	3
(Australia) G Masters	6	6
(Australia) R Case	3	1
(United States) S Krulevitz	2	6
5	(Romania) I Năstase	6	7

Second round
4	(Mexico) R Ramirez	6	6
(United States) S Stewart	3	0
(Mexico) M Lara	1	4
9	(Chile) J Fillol	6	6
14	(South Africa) C Drysdale	3	6
(United States) C Richey	6	7
(Australia) G Masters	7	4	3
5	(Romania) I Năstase	6	6	6

Third round
4	(Mexico) R Ramirez	6	6
9	(Chile) J Fillol	4	4
(United States) C Richey	2	5
5	(Romania) I Năstase	6	7

Quarterfinals
4	(Mexico) R Ramirez	6	6
5	(Romania) I Năstase	2	4

=== Bottom half ===
==== Section 3 ====
First round
8	(United States) R Tanner	6	6
(United States) T Williams	1	2
(United States) G Hardie	6	3	7
(Paraguay) V Pecci	4	6	5
(Australia) C Dibley	3	6	6
Q	(United States) T Waltke	6	4	3
Q	(United States) B Manson	4	3
13	(United States) Tim Gullikson	6	6
16	(Australia) J Newcombe	2	3
(United States) R Lutz	6	6
(United States) M Riessen	0	6
Q	(United States) E van Dillen	6	7
(United States) B Martin	4	6	4
(South Africa) B Mitton	6	4	6
(New Zealand) B Fairlie	6	2
3	(Spain) M Orantes	7	6

Second round
8	(United States) R Tanner	6	7
(United States) G Hardie	1	6
(Australia) C Dibley	6	6
13	(United States) Tim Gullikson	3	4
(United States) R Lutz	6	6
Q	(United States) E van Dillen	3	4
(South Africa) B Mitton	4	2
3	(Spain) M Orantes	6	6

Third round
8	(United States) R Tanner	7	7
(Australia) C Dibley	6	6
(United States) R Lutz	3	5
3	(Spain) M Orantes	6	7

Quarterfinals
8	(United States) R Tanner	6	4	7
3	(Spain) M Orantes	1	6	5

==== Section 4 ====
First round
6	(United States) H Solomon	6	6
(South Africa) B Hewitt	2	3
(United States) B Walts	5	3
(Australia) D Crealy	7	6
Q	(United States) H Bunis	6	6	3
(United States) A Ashe	7	3	6
Q	(United States) J Austin	6	4	6
12	(Australia) J Alexander	4	6	2
10	(Australia) P Dent	2	7	1
(United States) T Leonard	6	6	6
(United States) N Saviano	7	6
(Czechoslovakia) J Granát	5	4
(United States) C Pasarell	6	6
(Egypt) I El Shafei	7	7
(Netherlands) T Okker	7	1	4
2	(United States) E Dibbs	6	6	6

Second round
6	(United States) H Solomon	6	6
(Australia) D Crealy	3	3
(United States) A Ashe	2	6	7
Q	(United States) J Austin	6	3	5
(United States) T Leonard	7	3	6
(United States) N Saviano	5	6	3
(Egypt) I El Shafei	7	6
2	(United States) E Dibbs	5	2

Third round
6	(United States) H Solomon	4	1
(United States) A Ashe	6	6
(United States) T Leonard	3	7	7
(Egypt) I El Shafei	6	6	6

Quarterfinals
(United States) A Ashe	6	6	3
(United States) T Leonard	4	7	6
