= 1974 American Airlines Tennis Games – Doubles =

Doubles
- 1974 American Airlines Tennis Games

Final
- Champions: (United States) Charlie Pasarell (United States) Sherwood Stewart
- Runners-up: (United States) Tom Edlefsen (Spain) Manuel Orantes
- Score: 6–4, 6–4

Events
Singles	Doubles
- Indian Wells Open

Charlie Pasarell and Sherwood Stewart won in the final 6–4, 6–4 against Tom Edlefsen and Manuel Orantes.

== Draw ==
Key

- Q = Qualifier
- WC = Wild card
- LL = Lucky loser
- Alt = Alternate
- ITF = ITF entry
- PR = Protected ranking
- SR = Special ranking
- SE = Special exempt
- JE = Junior exempt
- JR = Junior Accelerator Programme entrant
- CO = College Accelerator Programme entrant
- NG = Next Gen Accelerator Program entrant
- w/o = Walkover
- r = Retired
- d = Defaulted

=== Finals ===
Semifinals
(United States) Charlie Pasarell (United States) Sherwood Stewart	6	7
(New Zealand) Brian Fairlie (United States) Tom Leonard	2	6
(Australia) John Alexander (Australia) Bob Carmichael	6	6	6
(United States) Tom Edlefsen (Spain) Manuel Orantes	4	7	7

Final
(United States) Charlie Pasarell (United States) Sherwood Stewart	6	6
(United States) Tom Edlefsen (Spain) Manuel Orantes	4	4

=== Top half ===
First round
(United States) Charlie Pasarell (United States) Sherwood Stewart	6	7
(Egypt) Ismail El Shafei (United States) Andrew Pattison	3	6
(Japan) Jun Kamiwazumi (Mexico) Raúl Ramírez
(Australia) Dick Crealy (United States) Mike Estep	7	7
(United States) Paul Gerken (Mexico) Marcelo Lara	6	6
(Sweden) Björn Borg (Chile) Patricio Cornejo
(New Zealand) Brian Fairlie (United States) Tom Leonard	7	6
(Socialist Federal Republic of Yugoslavia) Z Franulović (Australia) Fred Stolle	6	4
(United States) Jeff Borowiak (Australia) Colin Dibley
(United States) Roy Barth (United States) Clark Graebner	3	6	7
(Denmark) Torben Ulrich (United States) Erik van Dillen	6	0	6
(Australia) Ross Case (United States) Dick Dell

Second round
(United States) Charlie Pasarell (United States) Sherwood Stewart	6	6	7
(Japan) Jun Kamiwazumi (Mexico) Raúl Ramírez	3	7	6
(Australia) Dick Crealy (United States) Mike Estep	5	6
(Sweden) Björn Borg (Chile) Patricio Cornejo	7	7
(New Zealand) Brian Fairlie (United States) Tom Leonard	7	7
(United States) Jeff Borowiak (Australia) Colin Dibley	6	6
(United States) Roy Barth (United States) Clark Graebner	6	6
(Australia) Ross Case (United States) Dick Dell	3	4

Quarterfinals
(United States) Charlie Pasarell (United States) Sherwood Stewart	7	6
(Sweden) Björn Borg (Chile) Patricio Cornejo	5	3
(New Zealand) Brian Fairlie (United States) Tom Leonard	6	6
(United States) Roy Barth (United States) Clark Graebner	4	0

Semifinals
(United States) Charlie Pasarell (United States) Sherwood Stewart	6	7
(New Zealand) Brian Fairlie (United States) Tom Leonard	2	6

=== Bottom half ===
First round
(Socialist Federal Republic of Yugoslavia) Boro Jovanović (United States) Marty Riessen	7	6
(United States) Frank Froehling (United States) Tom Gorman	5	2
(Australia) John Alexander (Australia) Bob Carmichael
(South Africa) Raymond Moore (United States) Cliff Richey	7	6	6
(Australia) Ray Ruffels (Argentina) Guillermo Vilas	5	7	4
(United States) Eddie Dibbs (Italy) A Zugarelli
(United States) Tom Edlefsen (Spain) Manuel Orantes	6	6
(Australia) Geoff Masters (Australia) B Phillips-Moore	3	4
(New Zealand) Onny Parun (United States) Butch Seewagen
(Australia) Phil Dent (United States) Jim McManus	6	4	6
(United Kingdom) Mark Cox (Spain) Antonio Muñoz	;3	6	3
(United States) Roscoe Tanner (Romania) Ion Țiriac

Second round
(Socialist Federal Republic of Yugoslavia) Boro Jovanović (United States) Marty Riessen	6	5
(Australia) John Alexander (Australia) Bob Carmichael	7	7
(South Africa) Raymond Moore (United States) Cliff Richey	6	6	6
(United States) Eddie Dibbs (Italy) A Zugarelli	3	7	7
(United States) Tom Edlefsen (Spain) Manuel Orantes	6	7
(New Zealand) Onny Parun (United States) Butch Seewagen	2	6
(Australia) Phil Dent (United States) Jim McManus	6	3	6
(United States) Roscoe Tanner (Romania) Ion Țiriac	3	6	2

Quarterfinals
(Australia) John Alexander (Australia) Bob Carmichael	6	6
(United States) Eddie Dibbs (Italy) A Zugarelli	0	2
(United States) Tom Edlefsen (Spain) Manuel Orantes	2	7	6
(Australia) Phil Dent (United States) Jim McManus	6	6	2

Semifinals
(Australia) John Alexander (Australia) Bob Carmichael	6	6	6
(United States) Tom Edlefsen (Spain) Manuel Orantes	4	7	7
