= 1974 American Airlines Tennis Games =

Tennis tournament held in Arizona

- Date: March 18–24
- Edition: 1st
- Draw: 64S / 32D
- Prize money: $150,000
- Surface: Hard / outdoor
- Location: Tucson, Arizona, United States

Champions

Singles
- (Australia) John Newcombe

Doubles
- (United States) Charlie Pasarell / (United States) Sherwood Stewart
- Indian Wells Open

The 1974 American Airlines Tennis Games was a men's tennis tournament played on outdoor hard courts. It was the 1st edition of the Indian Wells Masters and was an ATP sanctioned tournament but was not part of the WCT or Grand Prix seasons. The tournament was played in Tucson, Arizona in the United States and ran from March 18 through March 24, 1974. First-seeded John Newcombe won the singles title and $25,000 first-prize money.

== Finals ==
=== Singles ===
(Australia) John Newcombe defeated (United States) Arthur Ashe 6–3, 7–6

=== Doubles ===
(United States) Charlie Pasarell / (United States) Sherwood Stewart defeated (United States) Tom Edlefsen / (Spain) Manuel Orantes 6–4, 6–4
