= 1976 American Airlines Tennis Games =

- Date: March 22–28
- Edition: 3rd
- Draw: 64S / 24D
- Prize money: $200,000
- Surface: Hard / outdoor
- Location: Rancho Mirage, CA, United States
- Venue: Mission Hills Country Club

Champions

Singles
- (United States) Jimmy Connors

Doubles
- (Australia) Colin Dibley / (United States) Sandy Mayer
- Indian Wells Masters

The 1976 American Airlines Tennis Games was a tennis tournament played on outdoor hard courts. It was the third edition of the Indian Wells Masters and was an ATP sanctioned tournament but was not part of the WCT or Grand Prix seasons. It was played at the Mission Hills Country Club in Rancho Mirage, California in the United States and ran from March 22 through March 28, 1976. First-seeded Jimmy Connors won the singles title.

== Finals ==
=== Singles ===
(United States) Jimmy Connors defeated (United States) Roscoe Tanner 6–4, 6–4

- It was Connors' 4th singles title of the year and the 45th of his career.

=== Doubles ===
(Australia) Colin Dibley / (United States) Sandy Mayer defeated (South Africa) Raymond Moore / (United States) Erik van Dillen 6–4, 6–7, 7–6

- It was Dibley's 1st title of the year and the 9th of his career. It was Mayer's 2nd title of the year and the 9th of his career.
