= 1975 American Airlines Tennis Games =

Men's tennis tournament held in Arizona

- Date: March 31 – April 6
- Edition: 2nd
- Draw: 64S / 32D
- Prize money: $175,000
- Surface: Hard / outdoor
- Location: Tucson, Arizona, United States

Champions

Singles
- (Australia) John Alexander

Doubles
- (Mexico) Raúl Ramírez (United States) William Brown
- Indian Wells Masters

The 1975 American Airlines Tennis Games was a men's tennis tournament played on outdoor hard courts. It was the 2nd edition of the Indian Wells Masters and was an ATP sanctioned tournament but was not part of the WCT or Grand Prix seasons. The tournament was played in Tucson, Arizona in the United States and ran from March 31 through April 6, 1975. Twelfth-seeded John Alexander won the singles title.

== Finals ==
=== Singles ===
(Australia) John Alexander defeated (Romania) Ilie Năstase 7–5, 6–2

=== Doubles ===
(Mexico) Raúl Ramírez / (United States) William Brown defeated (South Africa) Raymond Moore / (United States) Dennis Ralston 2–6, 7–6, 6–4
