= 1974 American Airlines Tennis Games – Singles =

Singles
- 1974 American Airlines Tennis Games

Final
- Champion: (Australia) John Newcombe
- Runner-up: (United States) Arthur Ashe
- Score: 6–3, 7–6

Details
- Draw: 64
- Seeds: 8

Events
Singles	Doubles
- Indian Wells Open

John Newcombe won in the final 6–3, 7–6 against Arthur Ashe.

== Seeds ==
1. (Australia) John Newcombe (champion)
2. (Netherlands) Tom Okker (semifinals)
3. (Australia) Ken Rosewall (third round)
4. (United States) Arthur Ashe (final)
5. (United States) Stan Smith (semifinals)
6. (Australia) Rod Laver (quarterfinals)
7. (Spain) Manuel Orantes (first round)
8. (United States) Tom Gorman (first round)

== Draw ==
Key

- Q = Qualifier
- WC = Wild card
- LL = Lucky loser
- Alt = Alternate
- ITF = ITF entry
- PR = Protected ranking
- SR = Special ranking
- SE = Special exempt
- JE = Junior exempt
- JR = Junior Accelerator Programme entrant
- CO = College Accelerator Programme entrant
- NG = Next Gen Accelerator Program entrant
- w/o = Walkover
- r = Retired
- d = Defaulted

=== Finals ===
Semifinals
1	(Australia) John Newcombe	7	6	7
5	(United States) Stan Smith	5	7	6
4	(United States) Arthur Ashe	6	6
2	(Netherlands) Tom Okker	1	4

Final
1	(Australia) John Newcombe	6	7
4	(United States) Arthur Ashe	3	6

=== Top half ===
==== Section 1 ====
First round
1	(Australia) John Newcombe	7	7
(United States) Jeff Borowiak	5	6
(Romania) Ion Țiriac	6	6
(United States) Dick Dell	2	1
(United Kingdom) Mark Cox	2	6	6
(United States) Erik van Dillen	6	2	1
(United States) Harold Solomon	6	2	6
(Australia) B Phillips-Moore	2	6	2
(Australia) Allan Stone	2	7	6
7	(Spain) Manuel Orantes	6	6	3
(Mexico) Raúl Ramírez	6	6	6
(Socialist Federal Republic of Yugoslavia) Boro Jovanović	2	7	0
(United States) Brian Gottfried	3	6	6
(Australia) Bob Carmichael	6	3	4
(United States) Eddie Dibbs	6	7	6
(United States) Sherwood Stewart	7	6	2

Second round
1	(Australia) John Newcombe	6	6
(Romania) Ion Țiriac	1	2
(United Kingdom) Mark Cox	6	6	4
(United States) Harold Solomon	7	3	6
(Australia) Allan Stone	6	6
(Mexico) Raúl Ramírez	3	4
(United States) Brian Gottfried	2	6	6
(United States) Eddie Dibbs	6	0	3

Third round
1	(Australia) John Newcombe	6	6
(United States) Harold Solomon	4	3
(Australia) Allan Stone	2	2
(United States) Brian Gottfried	6	6

Quarterfinals
1	(Australia) John Newcombe	6	7
(United States) Brian Gottfried	2	5

==== Section 2 ====
First round
3	(Australia) Ken Rosewall	6	6	6
(Australia) John Alexander	4	7	3
(Australia) Ross Case	4	7	6
(United States) Clark Graebner	6	5	1
(South Africa) Cliff Drysdale	6	6
(Australia) Colin Dibley	4	1
(Mexico) Marcelo Lara	6	6
(Egypt) Ismail El Shafei	4	3
5	(United States) Stan Smith	6	5	6
(Socialist Federal Republic of Yugoslavia) Željko Franulović	4	7	4
(Australia) Geoff Masters	1	6	6
(Japan) Jun Kamiwazumi	6	4	1
(Chile) Jaime Fillol Sr	7	7
(United States) Mike Estep	6	6
(United States) Roscoe Tanner	6	6	6
(United States) Charlie Pasarell	7	4	4

Second round
3	(Australia) Ken Rosewall	4	7	6
(Australia) Ross Case	6	6	2
(South Africa) Cliff Drysdale	6	6
(Mexico) Marcelo Lara	4	2
5	(United States) Stan Smith	6	6
(Australia) Geoff Masters	3	;4
(Chile) Jaime Fillol Sr	7	6
(United States) Roscoe Tanner	5	2

Third round
3	(Australia) Ken Rosewall	4	4
(South Africa) Cliff Drysdale	6	6
5	(United States) Stan Smith	7	6
(Chile) Jaime Fillol Sr	6	2

Quarterfinals
(South Africa) Cliff Drysdale	6	5	3
5	(United States) Stan Smith	2	7	6

=== Bottom half ===
==== Section 3 ====
First round
(United States) Jim McManus	6	7
(Spain) Antonio Muñoz	1	5
(Italy) Adriano Panatta	6	7
(Australia) Dick Crealy	4	5
(United Kingdom) Graham Stilwell	5	6	6
(Denmark) Torben Ulrich	7	4	0
6	(Australia) Rod Laver	6	6
(United States) Tom Edlefsen	2	0
(United Kingdom) Gerald Battrick	6	4	6
(United States) Roy Barth	2	6	0
(New Zealand) Brian Fairlie	2	6	6
(United States) Marty Riessen	6	2	3
(Argentina) Guillermo Vilas	3	6	7
(South Africa) Raymond Moore	6	2	5
4	(United States) Arthur Ashe	6	7
(Australia) Ray Ruffels	4	6

Second round
(United States) Jim McManus	2	6	2
(Italy) Adriano Panatta	6	4	6
(United Kingdom) Graham Stilwell	4	2
6	(Australia) Rod Laver	6	6
(United Kingdom) Gerald Battrick	6	6
(New Zealand) Brian Fairlie	3	4
(Argentina) Guillermo Vilas	2	2
4	(United States) Arthur Ashe	6	6

Third round
(Italy) Adriano Panatta	4	2
6	(Australia) Rod Laver	6	6
(United Kingdom) Gerald Battrick	1	2
4	(United States) Arthur Ashe	6	6

Quarterfinals
6	(Australia) Rod Laver	6	6	4
4	(United States) Arthur Ashe	7	1	6

==== Section 4 ====
First round
(Czechoslovakia) Milan Holeček	6	6
(United States) Frank Froehling	4	4
(United States) Cliff Richey	6	6
(Chile) Patricio Cornejo	2	2
(United States) Paul Gerken	6	6
(Italy) A Zugarelli	2	3
(United States) Robert Lutz	2	6	6
8	(United States) Tom Gorman	6	2	1
(Sweden) O Nils Bengtson	3	6	6
(Australia) Fred Stolle	6	3	4
(Sweden) Björn Borg	6	2	6
(New Zealand) Onny Parun	4	6	3
(United States) Andrew Pattison	7	6
(Australia) Phil Dent	6	3
2	(Netherlands) Tom Okker	6	6
(United States) Tom Leonard	3	4

Second round
(Czechoslovakia) Milan Holeček	7	3	6
(United States) Cliff Richey	6	6	3
(United States) Paul Gerken	4	3
(United States) Robert Lutz	6	6
(Sweden) O Nils Bengtson	1	7	6
(Sweden) Björn Borg	6	6	4
(United States) Andrew Pattison	6	3
2	(Netherlands) Tom Okker	7	6

Third round
(Czechoslovakia) Milan Holeček	6	4
(United States) Robert Lutz	7	6
(Sweden) O Nils Bengtson	6	5	5
2	(Netherlands) Tom Okker	4	7	7

Quarterfinals
(United States) Robert Lutz	3	5
2	(Netherlands) Tom Okker	6	7
