= Năstase =

Năstase is a Romanian surname. Notable people with the surname include:

- Adrian Năstase (born 1950), Romanian politician
- Andrei Năstase (born 1975), Moldovan activist, lawyer, and politician
- Doru Năstase (1933–1983), Romanian film director and actor
- Gheorghe Năstase (fl. 1910s), Bessarabian politician
- Horațiu Năstase, Romanian physicist and professor
- Ilie Năstase (born 1946), Romanian tennis player
- Liliana Năstase (born 1962), Romanian heptathlete
- Mihnea-Ion Năstase (born 1967), Romanian tennis player, nephew of Ilie Năstase
- Valentin Năstase (born 1974), Romanian footballer who played as a defender
- Vasile Năstase (born 1962), Romanian rower
- Viorel Năstase (born 1953), Romanian footballer who played as a forward

== See also ==
- Năstase, a village in Mihălăşeni Commune, Botoşani County
- Nastasen (fl. 335–315/310 BCE), king of Kush
