= 1975 Pacific Southwest Open =

- Date: September 15–21
- Edition: 49th
- Category: Grand Prix (Grade AA)
- Draw: 64S / 32D
- Prize money: $100,000
- Surface: Carpet / Indoor
- Location: Los Angeles, California, U.S.
- Venue: Pauley Pavilion

Champions

Singles
- (United States) Arthur Ashe

Doubles
- (India) Anand Amritraj / (India) Vijay Amritraj
- Pacific Southwest Open

The 1975 Pacific Southwest Open was a men's tennis tournament played on indoor carpet courts at the UCLA Pauley Pavilion in Los Angeles, California in the United States. The tournament was classified as Grade AA and was part of the Grand Prix tennis circuit. It was the 49th edition of the tournament and ran from September 15 through September 21, 1975. First-seeded Arthur Ashe won the singles title and the $16,000 first place prize money.

== Finals ==
=== Singles ===
(United States) Arthur Ashe defeated (United States) Roscoe Tanner 3–6, 7–5, 6–3

=== Doubles ===
(India) Anand Amritraj / (India) Vijay Amritraj defeated (South Africa) Cliff Drysdale / (United States) Marty Riessen 7–6^{(7–3)}, 4–6, 6–4
