= 1977 Pacific Southwest Open =

Men's tennis tournament

- Date: March 28 – April 3
- Edition: 51st
- Category: Grand Prix (Five star)
- Draw: 64S / 32D
- Prize money: $150,000
- Surface: Carpet / Indoor
- Location: Los Angeles, US
- Venue: Pauley Pavilion

Champions

Singles
- (United States) Stan Smith

Doubles
- (South Africa) Bob Hewitt / (South Africa) Frew McMillan
- Pacific Southwest Open

The 1977 Pacific Southwest Open, also known under its sponsorship name 1977 Arco–Pacific Southwest Open, was a men's tennis tournament played on indoor carpet courts at the Pauley Pavilion in Los Angeles, California in the United States. The event was part of the Grand Prix tennis circuit and categorized as five-star. It was the 51st edition of the tournament and was held from March 28 through April 3, 1977, a departure from its customary slot in September. Third-seeded Stan Smith won the singles title and $23,625 first-prize money as well as 150 ranking points.

== Finals ==
=== Singles ===
(United States) Stan Smith defeated (United States) Brian Gottfried 6–4, 2–6, 6–3

=== Doubles ===
(South Africa) Bob Hewitt / (South Africa) Frew McMillan defeated (United States) Bob Lutz / (United States) Stan Smith 6–3, 6–4
