= William Brown (tennis) =

American tennis player

- Country (sports): United States
- Born: January 14, 1945 (age 80); Omaha, Nebraska

Singles
- Career record: 26–79
- Highest ranking: No. 86 (December 20, 1974)

Grand Slam singles results
- Australian Open: 2R (1974)
- French Open: 2R (1974)
- Wimbledon: 1R (1973, 1975)
- US Open: 2R (1970, 1972, 1974)

Doubles
- Career record: 39–67
- Highest ranking: No. 82 (December 12, 1976)

William Brown (born January 14, 1945) is a retired professional tennis player from the United States. The right-hander was active during the 1970s and 1980s, and won four doubles titles on the tour: the 1973 Omaha Open, 1975 American Airlines Tennis Games (Tucson), 1975 at Shreveport and the 1976 Columbus Open.

== Tennis career ==
=== Early career ===
Brown attended Creighton Prep High School was undefeated in high school, winning city and state championships from 1960 to 1963. During his senior year of high school, Brown not only won every match on his way to winning the state high school championships, he did not drop a single set. He attended the University of Notre Dame on a tennis scholarship. As senior, he was named a "first team all-American" in 1967.

=== Professional career ===
Between 1967 and 1978, Brown played in major tennis tournaments around the world including the Australian Open, the US Open, the French Open, and Wimbledon. In 1973 he made it to the round of 16 in doubles at Wimbledon.

He competed against some of the greatest players at the time, including Arthur Ashe, Björn Borg, Jimmy Connors, Ilie Nastase, John Newcombe, and Stan Smith. Brown defeated Nastase in the opening round of the Canadian Open in 1974. By the end of 1974 he broke into the top 100 ranking at number 86.

He played senior tennis tournaments with Ken Stuart as his partner.
