= Raymond Moore (tennis) =

South African tennis player

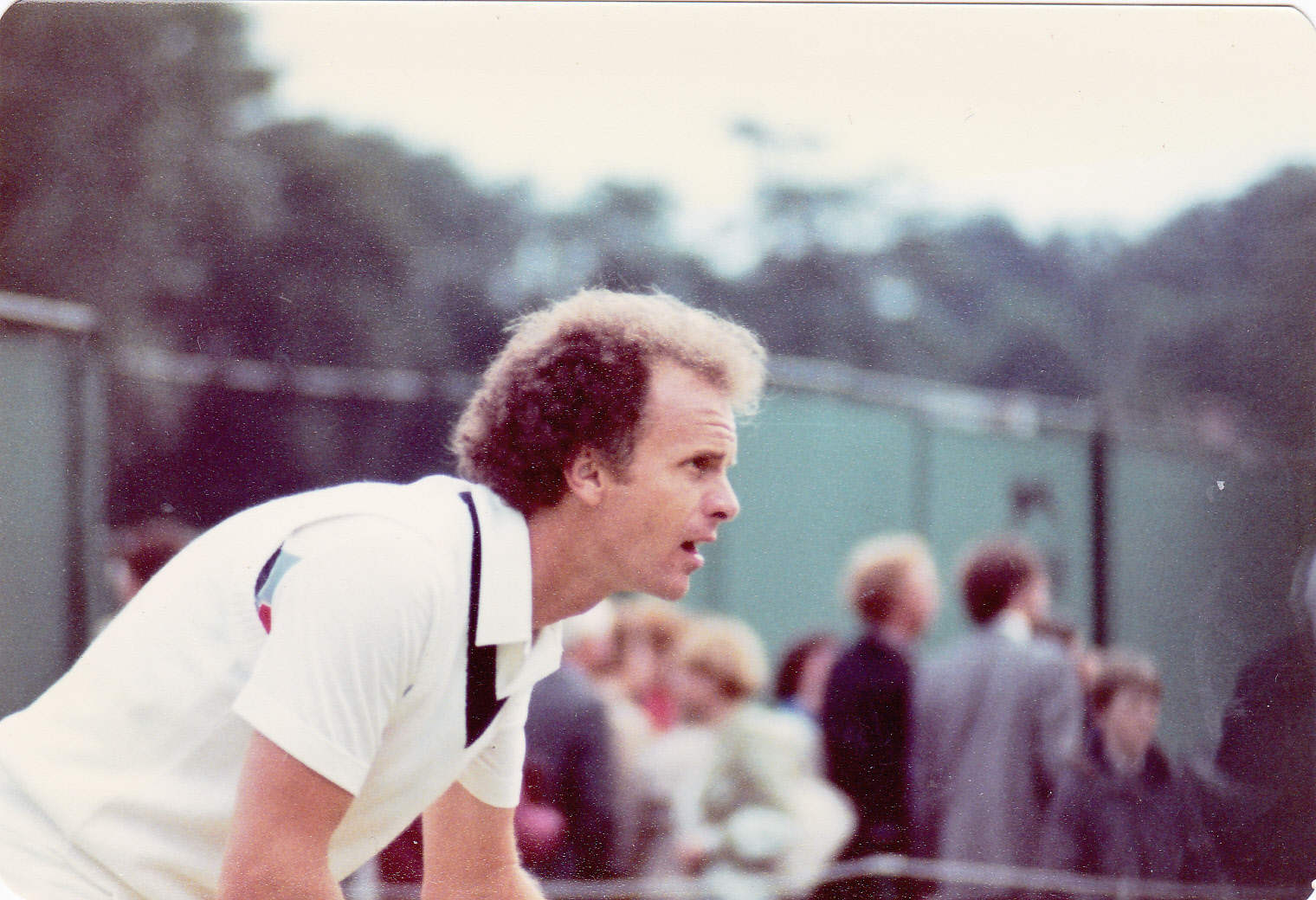
- Raymond Moore (1985)
- Country (sports): South Africa
- Residence: Palm Desert, California
- Born: 24 August 1946 (age 80) Johannesburg, South Africa
- Height: 1.83 m (6 ft 0 in)
- Turned pro: 1968 (amateur from 1963)
- Retired: 1983
- Plays: Right-handed (one-handed backhand)

Singles
- Career record: 571-528
- Career titles: 9
- Highest ranking: No. 34 (24 August 1976)

Grand Slam singles results
- Australian Open: 3R (1969, 1976)
- French Open: 3R (1972, 1975, 1979)
- Wimbledon: QF (1968)
- US Open: QF (1977)

Doubles
- Career record: 260–298 (Open era)
- Career titles: 8 (Open era)

Grand Slam doubles results
- Australian Open: SF (1969)

Team competitions
- Davis Cup: W (1974)

Raymond J. "Ray" Moore (born 24 August 1946) is a former professional tennis player from South Africa.

In June 1966 he won the East Gloucestershire Championships at Cheltenham on grass, defeating Tom Okker and Dick Crealy in the final two rounds.

In May 1969, Moore won the West Berlin Open Championships, defeating Arthur Ashe and Cliff Drysdale in close five-set matches.

During his career he won eight doubles titles in the Open Era alone, finishing runner-up an additional 12 times in Open Era doubles.

Moore participated in 12 Davis Cup ties for South Africa from 1967 to 1977, including the 1974 South African victory, posting a 12–10 record in singles and posting an 0–1 mark in doubles.

In 1981, Moore teamed with Charlie Pasarell to begin the tournament that eventually became the Indian Wells Masters at the Indian Wells Gardens. They started at La Quinta Resort and Club, moved to Grand Champions Hotel, and then in 2000 opened the new Indian Wells Gardens, which holds the ATP Masters BNP Paribus Open. Moore and Pasarell sold the tournament to Larry Ellison in 2009 and Moore became the tournament director/CEO for the new owner. The sale to Ellison was reported to be in the $100 million range.

== Remarks on female tennis and resignation ==
On 22 March 2016, Moore resigned as CEO of the Indian Wells Masters tennis tournament, after drawing outrage over his remarks about the roles of women in tennis:

"They don't make any decisions, and they are lucky. They are very, very lucky…If I was a lady player, I'd go down every night on my knees and thank God that Roger Federer and Rafa Nadal were born, because they have carried this sport. They really have."

== Career finals ==
=== Doubles: 21 (8 titles / 13 runner-ups) ===
Result	W/L	Date	Tournament	Surface	Partner	Opponents	Score
Loss	0–1	Aug 1969	Toronto, Canada	Clay	(United States) Butch Buchholz	(United States) Ron Holmberg (Australia) John Newcombe	3–6, 6–4
Loss	0–2	Jan 1971	Auckland, New Zealand	Grass	(New Zealand) Brian Fairlie	(Australia) Bob Carmichael (Australia) Ray Ruffels	3–6, 7–6, 4–6, 6–4, 3–6
Loss	0–3	Jun 1973	London/Queen's Club, UK	Grass	(Australia) Ray Keldie	(Netherlands) Tom Okker (United States) Marty Riessen	4–6, 5–7
Loss	0–4	Sep 1973	Aptos, US	Hard	(New Zealand) Onny Parun	(United States) Jeff Austin (United States) Fred McNair	2–6, 1–6
Loss	0–5	Mar 1974	Palm Desert, US	Hard	(New Zealand) Onny Parun	(Czechoslovakia) Jan Kodeš (Czechoslovakia) Vladimír Zedník	4–6, 4–6
Win	1–5	Apr 1974	Tokyo WCT, Japan	Hard	(New Zealand) Onny Parun	(Spain) Juan Gisbert Sr. (United Kingdom) Roger Taylor	4–6, 6–2, 6–4
Win	2–5	Nov 1974	Vienna, Austria	Hard (i)	(Rhodesia) Andrew Pattison	(South Africa) Bob Hewitt (South Africa) Frew McMillan	6–4, 5–7, 6–4
Loss	2–6	Apr 1975	Tucson, US	Hard	(United States) Dennis Ralston	(United States) William Brown (Mexico) Raúl Ramírez	6–2, 6–7, 4–6
Win	3–6	Aug 1975	Toronto, Canada	Hard	(South Africa) Cliff Drysdale	(Czechoslovakia) Jan Kodeš (Romania) Ilie Năstase	6–4, 5–7, 7–6
Loss	3–7	Mar 1976	Palm Springs, US	Hard	(United States) Erik van Dillen	(Australia) Colin Dibley (United States) Sandy Mayer	4–6, 7–6, 6–7
Loss	3–8	May 1976	Düsseldorf, Germany	Clay	(Australia) Bob Carmichael	(Poland) Wojciech Fibak (West Germany) Karl Meiler	4–6, 6–4, 4–6
Win	4–8	Oct 1976	Maui, US	Hard	(Australia) Allan Stone	(United States) Dick Stockton (United States) Roscoe Tanner	6–7, 6–3, 6–4
Loss	4–9	Dec 1977	Johannesburg, South Africa	Hard	(United States) Peter Fleming	(United States) Bob Lutz (United States) Stan Smith	3–6, 5–7, 7–6, 6–7
Win	5–9	Feb 1978	Palm Springs, US	Hard	(United States) Roscoe Tanner	(South Africa) Bob Hewitt (South Africa) Frew McMillan	6–4, 6–4
Win	6–9	Dec 1978	Johannesburg, South Africa	Hard	(United States) Peter Fleming	(South Africa) Bob Hewitt (South Africa) Frew McMillan	6–3, 7–6
Loss	6–10	Apr 1979	Johannesburg, South Africa	Hard	(Romania) Ilie Năstase	(United Kingdom) Colin Dowdeswell (Switzerland) Heinz Günthardt	3–6, 6–7
Win	7–10	Sep 1979	Atlanta, US	Hard	(Romania) Ilie Năstase	(Australia) Steve Docherty (United States) Eliot Teltscher	6–4, 6–2
Loss	7–11	Apr 1980	New Orleans, US	Carpet	(South Africa) Robert Trogolo	(United States) Terry Moor (United States) Eliot Teltscher	6–7, 1–6
Loss	7–12	Nov 1980	Paris Indoor, France	Hard (i)	(United States) Brian Gottfried	(Italy) Paolo Bertolucci (Italy) Adriano Panatta	4–6, 4–6
Win	8–12	Apr 1981	Johannesburg, South Africa	Hard	(South Africa) Bernard Mitton	(South Africa) Bob Hewitt (South Africa) Frew McMillan	7–5, 3–6, 6–1
Loss	8–13	Jul 1981	Hilversum, Netherlands	Clay	(South Africa) Andrew Pattison	(Switzerland) Heinz Günthardt (Hungary) Balázs Taróczy	0–6, 2–6
