= Andre Agassi career statistics =

List of his tennis achiements

Career finals
Discipline	Type	Won	Lost	Total	WR
Singles	Grand Slam	8	7	15	0.53
Singles	Grand Slam Cup	0	1	1	0.00
Singles	Year-end finals	1	3	4	0.25
Singles	ATP 1000*	17	5	22	0.77
Singles	ATP Tour	33	14	48	0.68
Singles	Olympics	1	–	1	1.00
Singles	Total	60	30	90	0.67
Doubles	Grand Slam	–	–	–	–
Doubles	Year-end finals	–	–	–	–
Doubles	ATP 1000*	1	1	2	0.50
Doubles	ATP Tour	–	2	2	0.00
Doubles	Olympics	–	–	–	–
Doubles	Total	1	3	4	0.25
1) WR = winning rate 2) * formerly "Super 9" (1996–1999), "Tennis Masters Series" (2000–2003) or "ATP Masters Series" (2004–2008).

This is a list of the main career statistics of former professional tennis player Andre Agassi.

== Singles performance timeline ==
Key
W	F	SF	QF	#R	RR	Q#	P#	DNQ	A	Z#	PO	G	S	B	NMS	NTI	P	NH

(W) winner; (F) finalist; (SF) semifinalist; (QF) quarterfinalist; (#R) rounds 4, 3, 2, 1; (RR) round-robin stage; (Q#) qualification round; (P#) preliminary round; (DNQ) did not qualify; (A) absent; (Z#) Davis/Fed Cup Zonal Group (with number indication) or (PO) play-off; (G) gold, (S) silver or (B) bronze Olympic/Paralympic medal; (NMS) not a Masters tournament; (NTI) not a Tier I tournament; (P) postponed; (NH) not held; (SR) strike rate (events won / competed); (W–L) win–loss record.

Tournament	1986	1987	1988	1989	1990	1991	1992	1993	1994	1995	1996	1997	1998	1999	2000	2001	2002	2003	2004	2005	2006	W–L	SR	Win %
Grand Slam tournaments
Australian Open	NH	A	A	A	A	A	A	A	A	W	SF	A	4R	4R	W	W	A	W	SF	QF	A	48–5	4 / 9	91%
French Open	A	2R	SF	3R	F	F	SF	A	2R	QF	2R	A	1R	W	2R	QF	QF	QF	1R	1R	A	51–16	1 / 17	76%
Wimbledon	A	1R	A	A	A	QF	W	QF	4R	SF	1R	A	2R	F	SF	SF	2R	4R	A	A	3R	46–13	1 / 14	78%
US Open	1R	1R	SF	SF	F	1R	QF	1R	W	F	SF	4R	4R	W	2R	QF	F	SF	QF	F	3R	79–19	2 / 21	81%
W–L	0–1	1–3	10–2	7–2	12–2	10–3	16–2	4–2	11–2	22–3	11–4	3–1	7–4	23–2	14–3	20–3	11–3	19–3	9–3	10–3	4–2	224–53	8 / 61	81%
Year-end championships
Masters Cup	DNQ		RR	RR	W	SF	DNQ		SF	A	RR	DNQ	RR	F	F	RR	RR	F	DNQ	RR	DNQ	22–20	1 / 13	52%
Grand Slam Cup	not held				A	A	1R	A	QF	A	1R	A	F	QF	not held							4–5	0 / 5	44%
Grand Prix					ATP Masters Series																			
Indian Wells Masters	2R	A	SF	QF	F	3R	3R	2R	2R	F	QF	1R	QF	A	1R	W	1R	A	SF	QF	3R	37–16	1 / 18	70%
Miami Open	A	1R	3R	1R	W	4R	2R	4R	F	W	W	2R	F	2R	SF	W	W	W	4R	SF	A	61–13	6 / 19	82%
Monte-Carlo Masters	A	A	A	A	A	2R	A	A	1R	A	3R	A	2R	A	A	A	A	A	A	A	A	2–4	0 / 4	33%
Italian Open	A	2R	QF	F	A	1R	A	A	2R	A	A	A	A	3R	3R	1R	W	1R	A	SF	A	24–10	1 / 11	71%
German Open	A	A	A	A	3R	A	2R	A	A	QF	A	A	A	A	A	2R	A	A	A	1R	A	5–5	0 / 5	50%
Canadian Open	A	A	A	SF	QF	2R	W	QF	W	W	A	A	SF	SF	1R	1R	A	QF	2R	F	A	38–11	3 / 14	78%
Cincinnati Masters	A	A	A	A	3R	3R	3R	SF	A	W	W	1R	2R	SF	2R	1R	QF	A	W	A	A	31–10	3 / 13	76%
Madrid Open^{1}	A	A	A	QF	2R	A	A	A	QF	3R	QF	1R	3R	SF	3R	2R	W	A	SF	A	A	19–11	1 / 12	63%
Paris Masters	A	A	A	A	A	A	2R	A	W	A	2R	A	QF	W	A	A	QF	A	A	A	A	14–4	2 / 6	78%
National representation
Summer Olympics	not held		A	not held			A	not held			G	not held			A	not held			A	not held		6–0	1 / 1	100%
Career statistics
	1986	1987	1988	1989	1990	1991	1992	1993	1994	1995	1996	1997	1998	1999	2000	2001	2002	2003	2004	2005	2006	W–L	SR	Win %
Tournaments	6	18	16	16	13	18	18	13	19	16	17	12	22	18	16	18	16	13	14	13	8	320		
Titles	0	1	6	1	4	2	3	2	5	7	3	0	5	5	1	4	5	4	1	1	0	60	60 / 320	
Hard W–L	4–5	21–10	33–6	20–6	26–5	17–7	19–7	27–8	29–6	53–3	34–7	11–10	55–13	41–10	25–9	35–10	37–8	32–6	37–10	32–7	8–6	596–159	46 / 201	79%
Clay W–L	0–0	5–5	29–3	13–4	9–4	10–4	15–4	2–1	4–4	11–3	2–2	1–1	5–3	9–2	4–3	5–4	13–2	9–2	0–2	6–4	0–0	152–57	7 / 61	73%
Grass W–L	0–0	0–1	0–0	0–0	0–0	4–1	7–0	4–2	3–1	5–1	0–1	0–0	1–1	6–1	6–2	5–1	1–1	6–2	0–1	0–0	2–2	50–18	1 / 19	74%
Carpet W–L	1–1	0–1	1–2	8–9	10–3	8–5	1–4	0–0	16–3	4–2	2–4	0–1	7–1	7–1	5–1	0–0	2–1	0–0	0–0	0–1	0–0	72–40	6 / 39	64%
Overall W–L	5–6	26–17	63–11	41–19	45–12	39–17	42–15	33–11	52–14	73–9	38–14	12–12	68–18	63–14	40–15	45–15	53–12	47–10	37–13	38–12	10–8	870–274	60 / 320	76%
Win %	46%	60%	85%	68%	79%	70%	74%	75%	79%	89%	73%	50%	79%	82%	73%	75%	82%	82%	74%	76%	56%	76%		
Ranking	91	25	3	7	4	10	9	24	2	2	8	110	6	1	6	3	2	4	8	7	150	$31,152,975		

Note: Tournaments were designated as the 'Masters Series' only after the ATP took over the running of the men's tour in 1990.

^{1}This event was held in Stockholm through 1994, Essen in 1995, and Stuttgart from 1996 through 2001.

== ATP Tour career earnings ==
Year	Majors	ATP wins	Total wins	Earnings ($)	Money list rank
1997	0	0	0	305,132	72
1998	0	5	5	1,836,233	9
1999	2	3	5	4,269,265	1
2000	1	0	1	1,884,443	6
2001	1	3	4	2,091,766	4
2002	0	5	5	2,186,006	3
2003	1	3	4	2,530,929	4
2004	0	1	1	1,177,254	9
2005	0	1	1	1,629,596	5
2006	0	0	0	156,700	141
Career	8	52	60	31,152,975	14

== Grand Slam tournament finals ==
=== Singles: 15 (8 titles, 7 runner-ups) ===
By winning the 1999 French Open, Agassi completed a men's singles Career Grand Slam. He was the fifth of eight male players in history (after Don Budge, Fred Perry, Rod Laver, Roy Emerson and before Roger Federer, Rafael Nadal, and Novak Djokovic) to achieve this.

Result	Year	Championship	Surface	Opponent	Score
Loss	1990	French Open	Clay	(Ecuador) Andrés Gómez	3–6, 6–2, 4–6, 4–6
Loss	1990	US Open	Hard	(United States) Pete Sampras	4–6, 3–6, 2–6
Loss	1991	French Open	Clay	(United States) Jim Courier	6–3, 4–6, 6–2, 1–6, 4–6
Win	1992	Wimbledon	Grass	(Croatia) Goran Ivanišević	6–7^{(8–10)}, 6–4, 6–4, 1–6, 6–4
Win	1994	US Open	Hard	(Germany) Michael Stich	6–1, 7–6^{(7–5)}, 7–5
Win	1995	Australian Open	Hard	(United States) Pete Sampras	4–6, 6–1, 7–6^{(8–6)}, 6–4
Loss	1995	US Open	Hard	(United States) Pete Sampras	4–6, 3–6, 6–4, 5–7
Win	1999	French Open	Clay	(Ukraine) Andrei Medvedev	1–6, 2–6, 6–4, 6–3, 6–4
Loss	1999	Wimbledon	Grass	(United States) Pete Sampras	3–6, 4–6, 5–7
Win	1999	US Open	Hard	(United States) Todd Martin	6–4, 6–7^{(5–7)}, 6–7^{(2–7)}, 6–3, 6–2
Win	2000	Australian Open	Hard	(Russia) Yevgeny Kafelnikov	3–6, 6–3, 6–2, 6–4
Win	2001	Australian Open	Hard	(France) Arnaud Clément	6–4, 6–2, 6–2
Loss	2002	US Open	Hard	(United States) Pete Sampras	3–6, 4–6, 7–5, 4–6
Win	2003	Australian Open	Hard	(Germany) Rainer Schüttler	6–2, 6–2, 6–1
Loss	2005	US Open	Hard	(Switzerland) Roger Federer	3–6, 6–2, 6–7^{(1–7)}, 1–6

== Other significant finals ==
=== Year-end championships finals ===
==== Singles: 4 (1 title, 3 runner-ups) ====
Result	Year	Championship	Surface	Opponent	Score
Win	1990	ATP Tour World Championships	Carpet (i)	(Sweden) Stefan Edberg	5–7, 7–6^{(7–5)}, 7–5, 6–2
Loss	1999	ATP Tour World Championships	Carpet (i)	(United States) Pete Sampras	1–6, 5–7, 4–6
Loss	2000	Tennis Masters Cup	Hard (i)	(Brazil) Gustavo Kuerten	4–6, 4–6, 4–6
Loss	2003	Tennis Masters Cup	Hard	(Switzerland) Roger Federer	3–6, 0–6, 4–6

=== Grand Slam Cup ===
==== Singles: 1 (1 runner-up) ====
Result	Year	Tournament	Surface	Opponent	Score
Loss	1998	Grand Slam Cup	Hard (i)	(Chile) Marcelo Ríos	4–6, 6–2, 6–7^{(1–7)}, 7–5, 3–6

=== ATP Masters Series finals (since 1990) ===
==== Singles: 22 (17 titles, 5 runner-ups) ====
Agassi won 17 Masters Series singles titles, which is currently the fourth highest of all time, behind Novak Djokovic, Rafael Nadal and Roger Federer. It is also the overall sixth highest total of 'tier one' titles (including those which preceded Masters 1000 events, such as the Super Nine) behind Novak Djokovic (40), Rafael Nadal (36) and Roger Federer (28).

Result	Year	Tournament	Surface	Opponent	Score
Loss	1990	Indian Wells Masters	Hard	(Sweden) Stefan Edberg	4–6, 7–5, 6–7, 6–7
Win	1990	Miami Open	Hard	(Sweden) Stefan Edberg	6–1, 6–4, 0–6, 6–2
Win	1992	Canadian Open	Hard	(United States) Ivan Lendl	3–6, 6–2, 6–0
Loss	1994	Miami Open	Hard	(United States) Pete Sampras	7–5, 3–6, 3–6
Win	1994	Canadian Open (2)	Hard	(Australia) Jason Stoltenberg	6–4, 6–4
Win	1994	Paris Masters	Carpet (i)	(Switzerland) Marc Rosset	6–3, 6–3, 4–6, 7–5
Loss	1995	Indian Wells Masters	Hard	(United States) Pete Sampras	5–7, 3–6, 5–7
Win	1995	Miami Open (2)	Hard	(United States) Pete Sampras	3–6, 6–2, 7–6
Win	1995	Canadian Open (3)	Hard	(United States) Pete Sampras	3–6, 6–2, 6–3
Win	1995	Cincinnati Masters	Hard	(United States) Michael Chang	7–5, 6–2
Win	1996	Miami Open (3)	Hard	(Croatia) Goran Ivanišević	3–0, ret.
Win	1996	Cincinnati Masters (2)	Hard	(United States) Michael Chang	7–6, 6–4
Loss	1998	Miami Open	Hard	(Chile) Marcelo Ríos	5–7, 3–6, 4–6
Win	1999	Paris Masters (2)	Carpet (i)	(Russia) Marat Safin	7–6, 6–2, 4–6, 6–4
Win	2001	Indian Wells Masters	Hard	(United States) Pete Sampras	7–6, 7–5, 6–1
Win	2001	Miami Open (4)	Hard	(United States) Jan-Michael Gambill	7–6, 6–1, 6–0
Win	2002	Miami Open (5)	Hard	(Switzerland) Roger Federer	6–3, 6–3, 3–6, 6–4
Win	2002	Italian Open	Clay	(Germany) Tommy Haas	6–3, 6–3, 6–0
Win	2002	Madrid Open	Hard (i)	(Czech Republic) Jiří Novák	W/O
Win	2003	Miami Open (6)	Hard	(Spain) Carlos Moyá	6–3, 6–3
Win	2004	Cincinnati Masters (3)	Hard	(Australia) Lleyton Hewitt	6–3, 3–6, 6–2
Loss	2005	Canadian Open	Hard	(Spain) Rafael Nadal	3–6, 6–4, 2–6

=== Olympic finals ===
==== Singles: 1 (1 gold medal) ====
Result	Year	Tournament	Surface	Opponent	Score
Win	1996	Atlanta	Hard	(Spain) Sergi Bruguera	6–2, 6–3, 6–1

== Career finals ==
=== Singles: 90 (60 titles, 30 runner-ups) ===
Legend Grand Slam (8–7) Year-end championships – ATP (1–3) Grand Slam Cup – ITF (0–1) ATP Super 9 / ATP Masters Series (17–5) Olympic Games (1–0) ATP Championship Series / ATP International Series Gold (6–3) Grand Prix / ATP World Series / ATP International Series (27–11)	Titles by surface Hard (46–24) Clay (7–5) Grass (1–1) Carpet (6–0)	Titles by setting Outdoors (48–22) Indoors (12–8)

Result	W-L	Date	Tournament	Surface	Opponent	Score
Loss	0–1	Apr 1987	Seoul, South Korea	Hard	(United States) Jim Grabb	6–1, 4–6, 2–6
Win	1–1	Nov 1987	Itaparica, Brazil	Hard	(Brazil) Luiz Mattar	7–6^{(8–6)}, 6–2
Win	2–1	Feb 1988	Memphis, US	Hard (i)	(Sweden) Mikael Pernfors	6–4, 6–4, 7–5
Win	3–1	Apr 1988	Charleston, US	Clay	(United States) Jimmy Arias	6–2, 6–2
Win	4–1	May 1988	Forest Hills, US	Clay	(Socialist Federal Republic of Yugoslavia) Slobodan Živojinović	7–5, 7–6^{(7–2)}, 7–5
Win	5–1	Jul 1988	Stuttgart, West Germany	Clay	(Ecuador) Andrés Gómez	6–4, 6–2
Win	6–1	Jul 1988	Stratton Mountain, US	Hard	(United States) Paul Annacone	6–2, 6–4
Win	7–1	Aug 1988	Livingston, US	Hard	(United States) Jeff Tarango	6–2, 6–4
Loss	7–2	Sep 1988	Los Angeles, US	Hard	(Sweden) Mikael Pernfors	2–6, 5–7
Loss	7–3	May 1989	Rome, Italy	Clay	(Argentina) Alberto Mancini	3–6, 6–4, 6–2, 6–7^{(2–7)}, 1–6
Win	8–3	Oct 1989	Orlando, US	Hard	(United States) Brad Gilbert	6–2, 6–1
Win	9–3	Feb 1990	San Francisco, US	Carpet (i)	(United States) Todd Witsken	6–1, 6–3
Loss	9–4	Mar 1990	Indian Wells, US	Hard	(Sweden) Stefan Edberg	4–6, 7–5, 6–7^{(1–7)}, 6–7^{(6–8)}
Win	10–4	Mar 1990	Miami, US	Hard	(Sweden) Stefan Edberg	6–1, 6–4, 0–6, 6–2
Loss	10–5	Jun 1990	French Open, Paris, France	Clay	(Ecuador) Andrés Gómez	3–6, 6–2, 4–6, 4–6
Win	11–5	Jul 1990	Washington, US	Hard	(United States) Jim Grabb	6–1, 6–4
Loss	11–6	Sep 1990	US Open, New York, US	Hard	(United States) Pete Sampras	4–6, 3–6, 2–6
Win	12–6	Nov 1990	ATP Finals, Frankfurt, Germany	Carpet (i)	(Sweden) Stefan Edberg	5–7, 7–6^{(7–5)}, 7–5, 6–2
Win	13–6	Apr 1991	Orlando, US	Hard	(United States) Derrick Rostagno	6–2, 1–6, 6–3
Loss	13–7	Jun 1991	French Open, Paris, France	Clay	(United States) Jim Courier	6–3, 4–6, 6–2, 1–6, 4–6
Win	14–7	Jul 1991	Washington, D.C., US (2)	Hard	(Czechoslovakia) Petr Korda	6–3, 6–4
Win	15–7	Apr 1992	Atlanta, US	Clay	(United States) Pete Sampras	7–5, 6–4
Win	16–7	Jul 1992	Wimbledon, London, UK	Grass	(Croatia) Goran Ivanišević	6–7^{(8–10)}, 6–4, 6–4, 1–6, 6–4
Win	17–7	Jul 1992	Toronto, Canada	Hard	(United States) Ivan Lendl	3–6, 6–2, 6–0
Win	18–7	Feb 1993	San Francisco, US (2)	Hard (i)	(United States) Brad Gilbert	6–2, 6–7^{(4–7)}, 6–2
Win	19–7	Feb 1993	Scottsdale, US	Hard	(South Africa) Marcos Ondruska	6–2, 3–6, 6–3
Win	20–7	Feb 1994	Scottsdale, US (2)	Hard	(Brazil) Luiz Mattar	6–4, 6–3
Loss	20–8	Mar 1994	Miami, US	Hard	(United States) Pete Sampras	7–5, 3–6, 3–6
Win	21–8	Jul 1994	Toronto, Canada (2)	Hard	(Australia) Jason Stoltenberg	6–4, 6–4
Win	22–8	Aug 1994	US Open, New York City, US	Hard	(Germany) Michael Stich	6–1, 7–6^{(7–5)}, 7–5
Win	23–8	Oct 1994	Vienna, Austria	Carpet (i)	(Germany) Michael Stich	7–6^{(7–4)}, 4–6, 6–2, 6–3
Win	24–8	Oct 1994	Paris, France	Carpet (i)	(Switzerland) Marc Rosset	6–3, 6–3, 4–6, 7–5
Win	25–8	Jan 1995	Australian Open, Melbourne, Australia	Hard	(United States) Pete Sampras	4–6, 6–1, 7–6^{(8–6)}, 6–4
Win	26–8	Feb 1995	San Jose, US (3)	Hard (i)	(United States) Michael Chang	6–2, 1–6, 6–3
Loss	26–9	Mar 1995	Indian Wells, US	Hard	(United States) Pete Sampras	5–7, 3–6, 5–7
Win	27–9	Mar 1995	Miami, US (2)	Hard	(United States) Pete Sampras	3–6, 6–2, 7–6^{(7–4)}
Loss	27–10	Apr 1995	Tokyo, Japan	Hard	(United States) Jim Courier	4–6, 3–6
Loss	27–11	May 1995	Atlanta, US	Clay	(United States) Michael Chang	2–6, 7–6^{(8–6)}, 4–6
Win	28–11	Jul 1995	Washington, US (3)	Hard	(Sweden) Stefan Edberg	6–4, 2–6, 7–5
Win	29–11	Jul 1995	Montreal, Canada (3)	Hard	(United States) Pete Sampras	3–6, 6–2, 6–3
Win	30–11	Aug 1995	Cincinnati, US	Hard	(United States) Michael Chang	7–5, 6–2
Win	31–11	Aug 1995	New Haven, US	Hard	(Netherlands) Richard Krajicek	3–6, 7–6^{(7–2)}, 6–3
Loss	31–12	Sep 1995	US Open, New York City, US	Hard	(United States) Pete Sampras	4–6, 3–6, 6–4, 5–7
Loss	31–13	Feb 1996	San José, US	Hard (i)	(United States) Pete Sampras	2–6, 3–6
Win	32–13	Mar 1996	Miami, US (3)	Hard	(Croatia) Goran Ivanišević	3–0, ret.
Win	33–13	Jul 1996	Olympic Games, Atlanta, US	Hard	(Spain) Sergi Bruguera	6–2, 6–3, 6–1
Win	34–13	Aug 1996	Cincinnati, US (2)	Hard	(United States) Michael Chang	7–6^{(7–4)}, 6–4
Win	35–13	Feb 1998	San Jose, US (4)	Hard (i)	(United States) Pete Sampras	6–2, 6–4
Win	36–13	Mar 1998	Scottsdale, US (3)	Hard	(Australia) Jason Stoltenberg	6–4, 7–6^{(7–3)}
Loss	36–14	Mar 1998	Miami, US	Hard	(Chile) Marcelo Ríos	5–7, 3–6, 4–6
Loss	36–15	May 1998	Munich, Germany	Clay	(Sweden) Thomas Enqvist	7–6^{(7–4)}, 6–7^{(6–8)}, 3–6
Win	37–15	Jul 1998	Washington, US (4)	Hard	(Australia) Scott Draper	6–2, 6–0
Win	38–15	Jul 1998	Los Angeles, US	Hard	(United Kingdom) Tim Henman	6–4, 6–4
Loss	38–16	Aug 1998	Indianapolis, US	Hard	(Spain) Àlex Corretja	6–2, 2–6, 3–6
Loss	38–17	Sep 1998	Grand Slam Cup, Munich, Germany	Hard (i)	(Chile) Marcelo Ríos	4–6, 6–2, 6–7^{(1–7)}, 7–5, 3–6
Loss	38–18	Oct 1998	Basel, Switzerland	Hard (i)	(United Kingdom) Tim Henman	4–6, 3–6, 6–3, 4–6
Win	39–18	Oct 1998	Ostrava, Czech Republic	Carpet (i)	(Slovakia) Ján Krošlák	6–2, 3–6, 6–3
Win	40–18	Apr 1999	Hong Kong, China	Hard	(Germany) Boris Becker	6–7^{(4–7)}, 6–4, 6–4
Win	41–18	May 1999	French Open, Paris, France	Clay	(Ukraine) Andrei Medvedev	1–6, 2–6, 6–4, 6–3, 6–4
Loss	41–19	Jul 1999	Wimbledon, London, UK	Grass	(United States) Pete Sampras	3–6, 4–6, 5–7
Loss	41–20	Aug 1999	Los Angeles, US	Hard	(United States) Pete Sampras	6–7^{(3–7)}, 6–7^{(1–7)}
Win	42–20	Aug 1999	Washington, US (5)	Hard	(Russia) Yevgeny Kafelnikov	7–6^{(7–3)}, 6–1
Win	43–20	Aug 1999	US Open, New York City, US (2)	Hard	(United States) Todd Martin	6–4, 6–7^{(5–7)}, 6–7^{(2–7)}, 6–3, 6–2
Win	44–20	Nov 1999	Paris, France (2)	Carpet (i)	(Russia) Marat Safin	7–6^{(7–1)}, 6–2, 4–6, 6–4
Loss	44–21	Nov 1999	ATP Finals, Hanover, Germany	Hard (i)	(United States) Pete Sampras	1–6, 5–7, 4–6
Win	45–21	Jan 2000	Australian Open, Melbourne, Australia (2)	Hard	(Russia) Yevgeny Kafelnikov	3–6, 6–3, 6–2, 6–4
Loss	45–22	Aug 2000	Washington, US	Hard	(Spain) Àlex Corretja	2–6, 3–6
Loss	45–23	Dec 2000	Tennis Masters Cup, Lisbon, Portugal	Hard (i)	(Brazil) Gustavo Kuerten	4–6, 4–6, 4–6
Win	46–23	Jan 2001	Australian Open, Melbourne, Australia (3)	Hard	(France) Arnaud Clément	6–4, 6–2, 6–2
Loss	46–24	Mar 2001	San José, US	Hard (i)	(United Kingdom) Greg Rusedski	3–6, 4–6
Win	47–24	Mar 2001	Indian Wells, US	Hard	(United States) Pete Sampras	7–6^{(7–5)}, 7–5, 6–1
Win	48–24	Mar 2001	Miami, US (4)	Hard	(United States) Jan-Michael Gambill	7–6^{(7–4)}, 6–1, 6–0
Win	49–24	Jul 2001	Los Angeles, US (2)	Hard	(United States) Pete Sampras	6–4, 6–2
Loss	49–25	Mar 2002	San José, US	Hard (i)	(Australia) Lleyton Hewitt	6–4, 6–7^{(6–8)}, 6–7^{(4–7)}
Win	50–25	Mar 2002	Scottsdale, US (4)	Hard	(Spain) Juan Balcells	6–2, 7–6^{(7–2)}
Win	51–25	Mar 2002	Miami, US (5)	Hard	(Switzerland) Roger Federer	6–3, 6–3, 3–6, 6–4
Win	52–25	May 2002	Rome, Italy	Clay	(Germany) Tommy Haas	6–3, 6–3, 6–0
Win	53–25	Jul 2002	Los Angeles, US (3)	Hard	(United States) Jan-Michael Gambill	6–2, 6–4
Loss	53–26	Sep 2002	US Open, New York, US	Hard	(United States) Pete Sampras	3–6, 4–6, 7–5, 4–6
Win	54–26	Oct 2002	Madrid, Spain	Hard (i)	(Czech Republic) Jiří Novák	W/O
Win	55–26	Jan 2003	Australian Open, Melbourne, Australia (4)	Hard	(Germany) Rainer Schüttler	6–2, 6–2, 6–1
Win	56–26	Feb 2003	San Jose, US (5)	Hard (i)	(Italy) Davide Sanguinetti	6–3, 6–1
Win	57–26	Mar 2003	Miami, US (6)	Hard	(Spain) Carlos Moyá	6–3, 6–3
Win	58–26	Apr 2003	Houston, US (2)	Clay	(United States) Andy Roddick	3–6, 6–3, 6–4
Loss	58–27	Nov 2003	Tennis Masters Cup, Houston, US	Hard	(Switzerland) Roger Federer	3–6, 0–6, 4–6
Win	59–27	Aug 2004	Cincinnati, US (3)	Hard	(Australia) Lleyton Hewitt	6–3, 3–6, 6–2
Loss	59–28	Nov 2004	Stockholm, Sweden	Hard (i)	(Sweden) Thomas Johansson	6–3, 3–6, 6–7^{(4–7)}
Win	60–28	Jul 2005	Los Angeles, US (4)	Hard	(Luxembourg) Gilles Müller	6–4, 7–5
Loss	60–29	Aug 2005	Montreal, Canada	Hard	(Spain) Rafael Nadal	3–6, 6–4, 2–6
Loss	60–30	Sep 2005	US Open, New York, US	Hard	(Switzerland) Roger Federer	3–6, 6–2, 6–7^{(1–7)}, 1–6

=== Doubles: 4 (1 title, 3 runner-ups) ===
Result	No.	Date	Tournament	Surface	Partner	Opponents	Score
Loss	1.	Jul 1992	Toronto, Canada	Hard	(United States) John McEnroe	(United States) Patrick Galbraith (South Africa) Danie Visser	4-6, 4-6
Win	1.	Aug 1993	Cincinnati, US	Hard	(Czech Republic) Petr Korda	(Sweden) Stefan Edberg (Sweden) Henrik Holm	7–6, 6–4
Loss	2.	Apr 1999	Hong Kong, China	Hard	(United States) David Wheaton	(New Zealand) James Greenhalgh (Australia) Grant Silcock	W/O
Loss	3.	Aug 2000	Washington, US	Hard	(Armenia) Sargis Sargsian	(United States) Alex O'Brien (United States) Jared Palmer	5-7, 1-6

=== Team competition: 3 (2 titles, 1 runner-up) ===
Result	No.	Date	Tournament	Surface	Partner	Opponents	Score
Win	1.	November 30 – December 2, 1990	Davis Cup, St. Petersburg, US	Clay (i)	(United States) Michael Chang (United States) Rick Leach (United States) Jim Pugh	(Australia) Darren Cahill (Australia) Pat Cash (Australia) Richard Fromberg (Australia) John Fitzgerald	3–2
Loss	1.	November 29 – December 1, 1991	Davis Cup, Lyon, France	Carpet (i)	(United States) Pete Sampras (United States) Ken Flach (United States) Robert Seguso	(France) Guy Forget (France) Henri Leconte (France) Arnaud Boetsch (France) Olivier Delaître	1–3
Win	2.	December 4–6, 1992	Davis Cup, Fort Worth, US	Carpet (i)	(United States) Jim Courier (United States) John McEnroe (United States) Pete Sampras	(Switzerland) Marc Rosset (Switzerland) Jakob Hlasek (Switzerland) Thierry Grin (Switzerland) Claudio Mezzadri	3–1

== Career ITF and exhibition finals ==
=== Singles ===
==== Wins (11) ====
No.	Date	Tournament	Surface	Opponent	Score
1.	September 20, 1987	Amelia Island Du Pont All American Tennis Championships, Florida, US	Clay	(United States) Jimmy Connors	4–3 ret.
2.	August 28, 1988	Norstar Hamlet Challenge Cup, Jericho, New York, US	Hard	(France) Yannick Noah	6–3, 0–6, 6–4
3.	April 30, 1989	AT&T Challenge of Champions, Atlanta, US	Clay	(United States) Michael Chang	6–3, 6–2
4.	July 30, 1989	ANA Cup, Yokohama, Japan	Hard	(Czech Republic) Ivan Lendl	7–6^{(8–6)}, 6–4
5.	December 10, 1989	ITT Stakes Match Round robin, Palm Coast, Florida, US	Hard	(United States) Jimmy Connors	6–4, 1–2 ret.
6.	September 15, 1991	Irving Tennis Classic, Irving, Texas, US	Clay	(United States) Jim Courier	6–1, 6–4
7.	November 30, 1997	USTA Men's Challenger, Burbank, California, US	Hard	(Armenia) Sargis Sargsian	6–2, 6–1
8.	January 15, 2000	Kooyong Colonial Classic, Melbourne, AUS	Hard	(Australia) Mark Philippoussis	Walkover
9.	January 13, 2001	Kooyong Colonial Classic, Melbourne, AUS	Hard	(Russia) Yevgeny Kafelnikov	6–3, 3–6, 6–3
10.	December 12, 2001	ITT Stakes Match round robin, Palm Coast, Florida, US	Hard	(United States) Pete Sampras	6–2, 6–4
11.	January 11, 2003	Kooyong Commonwealth Bank International, Melbourne, AUS	Hard	(France) Sébastien Grosjean	6–2, 6–3

==== Losses (5) ====
No.	Date	Tournament	Surface	Opponent	Score
1.	July 20, 1986	OTB Open, Schenectady, New York, US	Hard	(India) Ramesh Krishnan	2–6, 3–6
2.	November 16, 1997	USTA Men's Challenger, Las Vegas, Nevada, US	Hard	(Germany) Christian Vinck	2–6, 5–7
3.	January 17, 1998	Kooyong Colonial Classic, Melbourne, AUS	Hard	(Australia) Mark Philippoussis	3–6, 6–7^{(3–7)}
4.	January 12, 2002	Kooyong Commonwealth Bank International, Melbourne, AUS	Hard	(United States) Pete Sampras	6–7^{(6–8)}, 7–6^{(8–6)}, 3–6
5.	January 17, 2004	Kooyong Commonwealth Bank International, Melbourne, AUS	Hard	(Argentina) David Nalbandian	2–6, 3–6

== Career Grand Slam tournament seedings ==
The tournaments won by Agassi are in boldface.

Year	Australian Open	French Open	Wimbledon	US Open
1986	not held	did not play	did not play	not seeded
1987	did not play	not seeded	not seeded	not seeded
1988	did not play	9th	did not play	4th
1989	did not play	5th	did not play	6th
1990	did not play	3rd	did not play	4th
1991	did not play	4th	5th	8th
1992	did not play	11th	**12th**	8th
1993	did not play	did not play	8th	16th
1994	did not play	not seeded	12th	**not seeded**
1995	**2nd**	1st	1st	1st
1996	2nd	3rd	3rd	6th
1997	did not play	did not play	did not play	not seeded
1998	not seeded	not seeded	13th	8th
1999	5th	**13th**	4th	**2nd**
2000	**1st**	1st	2nd	1st
2001	**6th**	3rd	2nd	2nd
2002	did not play	4th	3rd	6th
2003	**2nd**	2nd	2nd	1st
2004	4th	6th	did not play	6th
2005	8th	6th	did not play	7th
2006	did not play	did not play	25th	not seeded

== Top 10 wins ==
Year	1987	1988	1989	1990	1991	1992	1993	1994	1995	1996	1997	1998	1999	2000	2001	2002	2003	2004	2005	2006	Total
Wins	1	2	1	8	5	7	2	14	8	7	1	8	12	7	5	5	7	5	3	1	**109**

#	Player	Rank	Event	Surface	Rd	Score	Agassi Rank
**1987**
1.	(Australia) Pat Cash	7	Stratton Mountain, United States	Hard	2R	7–6, 7–6	90
**1988**
2.	(United States) Jimmy Connors	6	US Open, New York, United States	Hard	QF	6–2, 7–6, 6–1	4
3.	(United States) Tim Mayotte	5	Masters Grand Prix, New York, USA	Carpet (i)	RR	6–2, 6–4	3
**1989**
4.	(United States) Brad Gilbert	5	Orlando, United States	Hard	F	6–2, 6–1	7
**1990**
5.	(Germany) Boris Becker	2	Indian Wells, United States	Hard	SF	6–4, 6–1	8
6.	(United States) Jay Berger	9	Miami, United States	Hard	SF	5–7, 6–1, 6–1	5
7.	(Sweden) Stefan Edberg	3	Miami, United States	Hard	F	6–1, 6–4, 0–6, 6–2	5
8.	(Germany) Boris Becker	2	US Open, New York, United States	Hard	SF	6–7, 6–3, 6–2, 6–3	4
9.	(United States) Pete Sampras	5	ATP Tour World Championships, Frankfurt, Germany	Carpet (i)	RR	6–4, 6–2	4
10.	(Spain) Emilio Sánchez	8	ATP Tour World Championships, Frankfurt, Germany	Carpet (i)	RR	6–0, 6–3	4
11.	(Germany) Boris Becker	2	ATP Tour World Championships, Frankfurt, Germany	Carpet (i)	SF	6–2, 6–4	4
12.	(Sweden) Stefan Edberg	1	ATP Tour World Championships, Frankfurt, Germany	Carpet (i)	F	5–7, 7–6, 7–5, 6–2	4
**1991**
13.	(Germany) Boris Becker	2	French Open, Paris, France	Clay	SF	7–5, 6–3, 3–6, 6–1	4
14.	(Germany) Michael Stich	5	Davis Cup, Kansas City, United States	Clay (i)	RR	6–3, 6–1, 6–4	8
15.	(Germany) Boris Becker	3	ATP Tour World Championships, Frankfurt, Germany	Carpet (i)	RR	6–3, 7–5	8
16.	(Germany) Michael Stich	4	ATP Tour World Championships, Frankfurt, Germany	Carpet (i)	RR	7–5, 6–3	8
17.	(France) Guy Forget	7	Davis Cup, Lyon, France	Carpet (i)	RR	6–7^{(8–10)}, 6–2, 6–1, 6–2	10
**1992**
18.	(Czechoslovakia) Petr Korda	10	Davis Cup, Fort Myers, United States	Hard	RR	6–2, 6–4, 6–1	14
19.	(United States) Pete Sampras	3	Atlanta, United States	Clay	F	7–5, 6–4	16
20.	(United States) Pete Sampras	3	French Open, Paris, France	Clay	QF	7–6^{(8–6)}, 6–2, 6–1	12
21.	(Germany) Boris Becker	5	Wimbledon, London, England	Grass	QF	4–6, 6–2, 6–2, 4–6, 6–3	14
22.	(Croatia) Goran Ivanišević	8	Wimbledon, London, England	Grass	F	6–7^{(8–10)}, 6–4, 6–4, 1–6, 6–4	14
23.	(Spain) Carlos Costa	10	US Open, New York, United States	Hard	4R	6–4, 6–3, 6–2	9
24.	(Sweden) Stefan Edberg	1	Davis Cup, Minneapolis, United States	Clay (i)	RR	5–7, 6–3, 7–6, 6–3	6
**1993**
25.	(United States) Michael Chang	8	Montreal, Canada	Hard	3R	7–6^{(7–3)}, 6–3	31
26.	(Germany) Michael Stich	6	Cincinnati, United States	Hard	QF	6–3, 6–2	28
**1994**
27.	(Sweden) Stefan Edberg	3	Miami, United States	Hard	QF	7–6^{(9–7)}, 6–2	31
28.	(Spain) Sergi Bruguera	4	Toronto, Canada	Hard	QF	4–6, 7–6^{(7–2)}, 6–1	20
29.	(United States) Michael Chang	6	US Open, New York, United States	Hard	4R	6–1, 6–7^{(3–7)}, 6–3, 3–6, 6–1	20
30.	(United States) Todd Martin	9	US Open, New York, United States	Hard	SF	6–3, 4–6, 6–2, 6–3	20
31.	(Germany) Michael Stich	4	US Open, New York, United States	Hard	F	6–1, 7–6^{(7–5)}, 7–5	20
32.	(Croatia) Goran Ivanišević	2	Vienna, Austria	Carpet (i)	SF	6–4, 6–4	10
33.	(Germany) Michael Stich	3	Vienna, Austria	Carpet (i)	F	7–6^{(7–4)}, 4–6, 6–2, 6–3	10
34.	(United States) Todd Martin	10	Stockholm, Sweden	Carpet (i)	3R	6–7^{(4–7)}, 6–4, 6–1	8
35.	(United States) Todd Martin	10	Paris, France	Hard (i)	3R	6–2, 7–5	7
36.	(United States) Pete Sampras	1	Paris, France	Hard (i)	QF	7–6^{(8–6)}, 7–5	7
37.	(Spain) Sergi Bruguera	5	Paris, France	Hard (i)	SF	7–6^{(8–6)}, 7–5	7
38.	(Spain) Alberto Berasategui	7	ATP Tour World Championships, Frankfurt, Germany	Carpet (i)	RR	6–2, 6–0	2
39.	(United States) Michael Chang	6	ATP Tour World Championships, Frankfurt, Germany	Carpet (i)	RR	6–4, 6–4	2
40.	(Spain) Sergi Bruguera	3	ATP Tour World Championships, Frankfurt, Germany	Carpet (i)	RR	6–4, 1–6, 6–3	2
**1995**
41.	(United States) Pete Sampras	1	Australian Open, Melbourne, Australia	Hard	F	4–6, 6–1, 7–6^{(8–6)}, 6–4	2
42.	(United States) Michael Chang	6	San Jose, United States	Hard (i)	F	6–2, 1–6, 6–3	2
43.	(Germany) Boris Becker	3	Indian Wells, United States	Hard	SF	6–4, 7–6^{(7–4)}	2
44.	(United States) Pete Sampras	1	Miami, United States	Hard	F	3–6, 6–2, 7–6^{(7–3)}	2
45.	(South Africa) Wayne Ferreira	10	Tokyo, Japan	Hard	SF	7–5, 6–2	**1**
46.	(United States) Pete Sampras	2	Montreal, Canada	Hard	F	3–6, 6–2, 6–3	**1**
47.	(United States) Michael Chang	5	Cincinnati, United States	Hard	F	7–5, 6–2	**1**
48.	(Germany) Boris Becker	4	US Open, New York, United States	Hard	SF	7–6^{(7–4)}, 7–6^{(7–2)}, 4–6, 6–4	**1**
**1996**
49.	(United States) Jim Courier	8	Australian Open, Melbourne, Australia	Hard	QF	6–7^{(7–9)}, 2–6, 6–3, 6–4, 6–2	2
50.	(United States) Michael Chang	5	San Jose, United States	Hard (i)	SF	6–2, 5–7, 6–4	3
51.	(Croatia) Goran Ivanišević	6	Miami, United States	Hard	F	3–0, retirement	3
52.	(Russia) Yevgeny Kafelnikov	4	Cincinnati, United States	Hard	QF	7–6^{(7–1)}, 3–6, 6–3	7
53.	(Austria) Thomas Muster	2	Cincinnati, United States	Hard	SF	6–4, 6–1	7
54.	(United States) Michael Chang	3	Cincinnati, United States	Hard	F	7–6^{(7–4)}, 6–4	7
55.	(Austria) Thomas Muster	2	US Open, New York, United States	Hard	QF	6–2, 7–5, 4–6, 6–2	9
**1997**
56.	(Spain) Àlex Corretja	5	Indianapolis, United States	Hard	3R	7–5, 6–1	74
**1998**
57.	(United States) Michael Chang	7	San Jose, United States	Hard (i)	SF	6–4, 7–6^{(7–4)}	71
58.	(United States) Pete Sampras	1	San Jose, United States	Hard (i)	F	6–2, 6–4	71
59.	(Australia) Patrick Rafter	3	Indian Wells, United States	Hard	3R	6–3, 3–6, 6–2	40
60.	(Spain) Àlex Corretja	8	Miami, United States	Hard	SF	6–4, 6–2	31
61.	(Sweden) Jonas Björkman	7	Munich, Germany	Clay	QF	6–2, 6–2	20
62.	(United States) Pete Sampras	1	Toronto, Canada	Hard	QF	6–7^{(5–7)}, 6–1, 6–2	11
63.	(Czech Republic) Petr Korda	4	Grand Slam Cup, Munich, Germany	Hard (i)	QF	4–6, 6–0, 6–1	8
64.	(Slovakia) Karol Kučera	6	Grand Slam Cup, Munich, Germany	Hard (i)	SF	7–6, 6–7, 2–6, 7–5, 6–0	8
**1999**
65.	(Spain) Carlos Moyá	4	French Open, Paris, France	Clay	4R	4–6, 7–5, 7–5, 6–1	14
66.	(Brazil) Gustavo Kuerten	7	Wimbledon, London, England	Grass	QF	6–3, 6–4, 6–4	4
67.	(Australia) Patrick Rafter	2	Wimbledon, London, England	Grass	SF	7–5, 7–6^{(7–5)}, 6–2	4
68.	(Brazil) Gustavo Kuerten	6	Cincinnati, United States	Hard	QF	6–2, 7–6^{(12–10)}	3
69.	(United States) Todd Martin	7	Washington, United States	Hard	SF	6–4, 6–2	3
70.	(Russia) Yevgeny Kafelnikov	2	Washington, United States	Hard	F	7–6^{(7–3)}, 6–1	3
71.	(Russia) Yevgeny Kafelnikov	3	US Open, New York, United States	Hard	SF	1–6, 6–3, 6–3, 6–3	2
72.	(United States) Todd Martin	7	US Open, New York, United States	Hard	F	6–4, 6–7^{(5–7)}, 6–7^{(2–7)}, 6–3, 6–2	2
73.	(Ecuador) Nicolás Lapentti	8	ATP Tour World Championships, Hanover, Germany	Hard (i)	RR	6–1, 6–2	**1**
74.	(United States) Pete Sampras	5	ATP Tour World Championships, Hanover, Germany	Hard (i)	RR	6–2, 6–2	**1**
75.	(Brazil) Gustavo Kuerten	5	ATP Tour World Championships, Hanover, Germany	Hard (i)	RR	6–4, 7–5	**1**
76.	(Russia) Yevgeny Kafelnikov	2	ATP Tour World Championships, Hanover, Germany	Hard (i)	SF	6–4, 7–6^{(7–5)}	**1**
**2000**
77.	(United States) Pete Sampras	3	Australian Open, Melbourne, Australia	Hard	SF	6–4, 3–6, 6–7^{(0–7)}, 7–6^{(7–5)}, 6–1	**1**
78.	(Russia) Yevgeny Kafelnikov	2	Australian Open, Melbourne, Australia	Hard	F	3–6, 6–3, 6–2, 6–4	**1**
79.	(United Kingdom) Tim Henman	10	Miami, United States	Hard	QF	7–5, 1–6, 7–6^{(12–10)}	**1**
80.	(Brazil) Gustavo Kuerten	2	Tennis Masters Cup, Lisbon, Portugal	Hard (i)	RR	4–6, 6–4, 6–3	8
81.	(Russia) Yevgeny Kafelnikov	5	Tennis Masters Cup, Lisbon, Portugal	Hard (i)	RR	6–1, 6–4	8
82.	(Sweden) Magnus Norman	4	Tennis Masters Cup, Lisbon, Portugal	Hard (i)	RR	6–3, 6–2	8
83.	(Russia) Marat Safin	1	Tennis Masters Cup, Lisbon, Portugal	Hard (i)	SF	6–3, 6–3	8
**2001**
84.	(Australia) Lleyton Hewitt	8	Indian Wells, United States	Hard	SF	6–4, 3–6, 6–4	4
85.	(United States) Pete Sampras	3	Indian Wells, United States	Hard	F	7–6^{(7–5)}, 7–5, 6–1	4
86.	(Australia) Patrick Rafter	8	Miami, United States	Hard	SF	6–0, 6–7^{(2–7)}, 6–2	3
87.	(Brazil) Gustavo Kuerten	1	Los Angeles, United States	Hard	SF	6–7^{(3–7)}, 6–3, 6–3	3
88.	(Australia) Patrick Rafter	5	Tennis Masters Cup, Sydney, Australia	Hard (i)	RR	6–2, 6–4	3
**2002**
89.	(Sweden) Thomas Johansson	8	Miami, United States	Hard	4R	7–5, 6–2	10
90.	(Germany) Tommy Haas	7	Rome, Italy	Clay	F	6–3, 6–3, 6–0	9
91.	(Australia) Lleyton Hewitt	1	US Open, New York, United States	Hard	SF	6–4, 7–6^{(7–5)}, 6–7^{(1–7)}, 6–2	6
92.	(Spain) Juan Carlos Ferrero	6	Madrid, Spain	Hard (i)	QF	6–3, 6–2	2
93.	(France) Sébastien Grosjean	8	Madrid, Spain	Hard (i)	SF	6–4, 3–6, 6–4	2
**2003**
94.	(Spain) Albert Costa	9	Miami, United States	Hard	SF	6–2, 6–4	2
95.	(Spain) Carlos Moyá	5	Miami, United States	Hard	F	6–3, 6–3	2
96.	(United States) Andy Roddick	5	Houston, United States	Clay	F	3–6, 6–3, 6–4	2
97.	(Argentina) Guillermo Coria	5	US Open, New York, United States	Hard	QF	6–4, 6–3, 7–5	**1**
98.	(Spain) Juan Carlos Ferrero	2	Tennis Masters Cup, Houston, United States	Hard	RR	2–6, 6–3, 6–4	5
99.	(Argentina) David Nalbandian	8	Tennis Masters Cup, Houston, United States	Hard	RR	7–6^{(12–10)}, 3–6, 6–4	5
100.	(Germany) Rainer Schüttler	6	Tennis Masters Cup, Houston, United States	Hard	SF	5–7, 6–0, 6–4	5
**2004**
101.	(France) Sébastien Grosjean	10	Australian Open, Melbourne, Australia	Hard	QF	6–2, 2–0, retirement	4
102.	(Argentina) Guillermo Coria	4	Indian Wells, United States	Hard	QF	6–4, 7–5	5
103.	(Spain) Carlos Moyá	4	Cincinnati, United States	Hard	QF	7–6^{(14–12)}, 6–3	11
104.	(United States) Andy Roddick	2	Cincinnati, United States	Hard	SF	7–5, 6–7^{(2–7)}, 7–6^{(7–2)}	11
105.	(Australia) Lleyton Hewitt	10	Cincinnati, United States	Hard	F	6–3, 3–6, 6–2	11
**2005**
106.	(Argentina) Guillermo Coria	5	Indian Wells, United States	Hard	4R	6–4, 6–1	9
107.	(Argentina) Gastón Gaudio	8	Miami, United States	Hard	4R	7–6^{(9–7)}, 6–2	10
108.	(Argentina) Gastón Gaudio	8	Montreal, Canada	Hard	QF	6–3, 6–4	7
**2006**
109.	(Cyprus) Marcos Baghdatis	8	US Open, New York, United States	Hard	2R	6–4, 6–4, 3–6, 5–7, 7–5	39

== See also ==
- Lists of tennis players
- List of Grand Slam men's singles champions
- Chronological list of men's Grand Slam tennis champions
- List of Open Era Grand Slam champions by country
- List of Olympic medalists in tennis
- List of ATP number 1 ranked singles tennis players
- Top ten ranked male tennis players
- ATP Finals appearances
- United States Davis Cup team
- List of United States Davis Cup team representatives
