= 1999 Salem Open =

- Date: 5–12 April
- Edition: 24th
- Category: International Series
- Draw: 32S / 16D
- Prize money: $325,000
- Surface: Hard / outdoor
- Location: Hong Kong, Hong Kong

Champions

Singles
- (United States) Andre Agassi

Doubles
- (New Zealand) James Greenhalgh / (Australia) Grant Silcock
- Hong Kong Open

The 1999 Salem Open was a men's tennis tournament played on Hard courts in Hong Kong that was part of the International Series of the 1999 ATP Tour. It was the twenty-fourth edition of the tournament and was held from 5 April until 12 April 1999. Third-seeded Andre Agassi won the singles title.

== Finals ==
=== Singles ===
(United States) Andre Agassi defeated (Germany) Boris Becker, 6–7^{(4–7)}, 6–4, 6–4.

- It was Agassi's 1st singles title of the year and the 40th of his career.

=== Doubles ===
(New Zealand) James Greenhalgh / (Australia) Grant Silcock defeated (United States) Andre Agassi / (United States) David Wheaton, walkover.
