= 2005 Mercedes-Benz Cup =

- Date: July 25–31
- Edition: 79th
- Category: ATP International Series
- Draw: 32S / 16D
- Prize money: $355,000
- Surface: Hard / outdoor
- Location: Los Angeles, United States
- Venue: Los Angeles Tennis Center

Champions

Singles
- (United States) Andre Agassi

Doubles
- (United States) Rick Leach / (United States) Brian MacPhie
← 2004 ·	Los Angeles Open	· 2006 →

The 2005 Mercedes-Benz Cup was a men's tennis tournament played on outdoor hard courts at the Los Angeles Tennis Center in Los Angeles, California in the United States and was part of the International Series of the 2005 ATP Tour. It was the 79th edition of the Los Angeles Open and the tournament ran from July 25 through July 31, 2005. First-seeded Andre Agassi won his fourth singles title at the tournament.

== Finals ==
=== Singles ===
(United States) Andre Agassi defeated (Luxembourg) Gilles Müller 6–4, 7–5

- It was Agassi's only singles title of the year and the 60th and last of his career.

=== Doubles ===
(United States) Rick Leach / (United States) Brian MacPhie defeated (Israel) Jonathan Erlich / (Israel) Andy Ram 6–3, 6–4
