= 1999 ATP Tour World Championships – Singles =

Singles
- 1999 ATP Tour World Championships

Final
- Champion: (United States) Pete Sampras
- Runner-up: (United States) Andre Agassi
- Score: 6–1, 7–5, 6–4

Details
- Draw: 8 (round robin)

Events
Singles	Doubles
← 1998 ·	ATP Finals	· 2000 →

Pete Sampras defeated Andre Agassi in the final, 6–1, 7–5, 6–4 to win the singles tennis title at the 1999 Tennis Masters Cup. It was his fifth and last Tour Finals title.

Àlex Corretja was the reigning champion, but did not qualify.

== Seeds ==
1. (United States) Andre Agassi (final)
2. (Russia) Yevgeny Kafelnikov (semifinals)
3. (Brazil) Gustavo Kuerten (round robin)
4. (Sweden) Thomas Enqvist (round robin)
5. (United States) Pete Sampras (champion)
6. (Germany) Nicolas Kiefer (semifinals)
7. (United States) Todd Martin (round robin)
8. (Ecuador) Nicolás Lapentti (round robin)

== Draw ==
Key

- Q = Qualifier
- WC = Wild card
- LL = Lucky loser
- Alt = Alternate
- ITF = ITF entry
- PR = Protected ranking
- SR = Special ranking
- SE = Special exempt
- JE = Junior exempt
- JR = Junior Accelerator Programme entrant
- CO = College Accelerator Programme entrant
- NG = Next Gen Accelerator Program entrant
- w/o = Walkover
- r = Retired
- d = Defaulted

=== Finals ===
Semifinals
1	(United States) Andre Agassi	6	7^{7}
2	(Russia) Yevgeny Kafelnikov	4	6^{5}
6	(Germany) Nicolas Kiefer	3	3
5	(United States) Pete Sampras	6	6

Final
1	(United States) Andre Agassi	1	5	4
5	(United States) Pete Sampras	6	7	6

=== White group ===
		(United States) Agassi	(Brazil) Kuerten	(United States) Sampras	(Ecuador) Lapentti	RR; W–L	Set; W–L	Game; W–L	Standings
1	(United States) Andre Agassi		6–4, 7–5	6–2, 6–2	6–1, 6–2	3–0	6–0	37–16	1
3	(Brazil) Gustavo Kuerten	4–6, 5–7		2–6, 3–6	6–1, 6–2	1–2	2–4	26–28	3
5	(United States) Pete Sampras	2–6, 2–6	6–2, 6–3		7–6^{(7–2)}, 7–6^{(7–5)}	2–1	4–2	30–29	2
8	(Ecuador) Nicolás Lapentti	1–6, 2–6	1–6, 2–6	6–7^{(2–7)}, 6–7^{(5–7)}		0–3	0–6	18–38	4

Standings are determined by: 1. number of wins; 2. number of matches; 3. in two-players-ties, head-to-head records; 4. in three-players-ties, percentage of sets won, or of games won; 5. steering-committee decision.

=== Red group ===
		(Russia) Kafelnikov	(Sweden) Enqvist	(Germany) Kiefer	(United States) Martin	RR; W–L	Set; W–L	Game; W–L	Standings
2	(Russia) Yevgeny Kafelnikov		7–5, 3–6, 6–4	1–6, 6–4, 2–6	6–4, 1–6, 6–1	2–1	5–4	38–42	2
4	(Sweden) Thomas Enqvist	5–7, 6–3, 4–6		6–4, 7–5	4–6, 1–6	1–2	3–4	33–37	4
6	(Germany) Nicolas Kiefer	6–1, 4–6, 6–2	4–6, 5–7		6–3, 6–2	2–1	4–3	37–27	1
7	(United States) Todd Martin	4–6, 6–1, 1–6	6–4, 6–1	3–6, 2–6		1–2	3–4	28–30	3

Standings are determined by: 1. number of wins; 2. number of matches; 3. in two-players-ties, head-to-head records; 4. in three-players-ties, percentage of sets won, or of games won; 5. steering-committee decision.

== See also ==
- ATP World Tour Finals appearances
