= 1999 Salem Open – Doubles =

Doubles
- 1999 Salem Open

Final
- Champions: (New Zealand) James Greenhalgh (Australia) Grant Silcock
- Runners-up: (United States) Andre Agassi (United States) David Wheaton
- Score: walkover

Events
Singles	Doubles
← 1998 ·	Salem Open

The 1999 Salem Open was a men's tennis tournament played on Hard courts in Hong Kong that was part of the International Series of the 1999 ATP Tour. It was the twenty-fourth edition of the tournament and was held from 5 April – 12 April.

== Seeds ==
Champion seeds are indicated in bold text while text in italics indicates the round in which those seeds were eliminated.

1. (The Bahamas) Mark Knowles / (Canada) Daniel Nestor (semifinals)
2. (United States) Jeff Tarango / (Czech Republic) Daniel Vacek (first round)
3. (Australia) Wayne Arthurs / (Czech Republic) Martin Damm (quarterfinals)
4. (Canada) Sébastien Lareau / (United States) Brian MacPhie (first round)

== Draw ==
Key

- Q = Qualifier
- WC = Wild card
- LL = Lucky loser
- Alt = Alternate
- ITF = ITF entry
- PR = Protected ranking
- SR = Special ranking
- SE = Special exempt
- JE = Junior exempt
- JR = Junior Accelerator Programme entrant
- CO = College Accelerator Programme entrant
- NG = Next Gen Accelerator Program entrant
- w/o = Walkover
- r = Retired
- d = Defaulted

=== Finals ===
First round
1	(The Bahamas) **M Knowles** **(Canada) D Nestor**	**6**	**6**
(Australia) M Hill (United States) S Humphries	3	4
(South Africa) **M Barnard** **(South Africa) B Talbot**	**6**	**6**
(South Africa) W Ferreira (South Africa) B Haygarth	2	3
3	(Australia) **W Arthurs** **(Czech Republic) M Damm**	**6**	6	**7**
(Argentina) M Rodríguez (Czech Republic) R Štěpánek	3	**7**	5
(New Zealand) **J Greenhalgh** **(Australia) G Silcock**	**7**	**6**
(Hong Kong) M Tong (Hong Kong) W Wong	6	4
(United States) **D DiLucia** **(United States) M Sell**	**7**	**7**
(United States) S Campbell (United States) C Mamiit	6	5
(Australia) **B Ellwood** **(Australia) M Tebbutt**	4	**6**	**7**
4	(Canada) S Lareau (United States) B MacPhie	**6**	4	6
(Germany) **N Kiefer** **(Germany) D Prinosil**	**6**	**6**
(Germany) H Dreekmann (Germany) C Vinck	2	4
(United States) **A Agassi** **(United States) D Wheaton**	**6**	**7**
2	(United States) J Tarango (Czech Republic) D Vacek	4	6

Quarterfinals
1	(The Bahamas) **M Knowles** **(Canada) D Nestor**	**6**	**6**
(South Africa) M Barnard (South Africa) B Talbot	1	4
3	(Australia) W Arthurs (Czech Republic) M Damm	6	4
(New Zealand) **J Greenhalgh** **(Australia) G Silcock**	**7**	**6**
(United States) D DiLucia (United States) M Sell	5	1
(Australia) **B Ellwood** **(Australia) M Tebbutt**	**7**	**6**
(Germany) N Kiefer (Germany) D Prinosil	1	2
(United States) **A Agassi** **(United States) D Wheaton**	**6**	**6**

Semifinals
1	(The Bahamas) M Knowles (Canada) D Nestor	6	6
(New Zealand) **J Greenhalgh** **(Australia) G Silcock**	**7**	**7**
(Australia) B Ellwood (Australia) M Tebbutt	4	3
(United States) **A Agassi** **(United States) D Wheaton**	**6**	**6**

Final
(New Zealand) **J Greenhalgh** **(Australia) G Silcock**	w/o
(United States) A Agassi (United States) D Wheaton
