= 1998 Salem Open =

- Date: 6–12 April
- Edition: 23rd
- Category: International Series
- Draw: 32S / 16D
- Prize money: $315,000
- Surface: Hard / outdoor
- Location: Hong Kong, Hong Kong

Champions

Singles
- (Denmark) Kenneth Carlsen

Doubles
- (Zimbabwe) Byron Black / (United States) Alex O'Brien
- Hong Kong Open

The 1998 Salem Open was a men's tennis tournament played on Hard courts in Hong Kong that was part of the International Series of the 1998 ATP Tour. It was the 23rd edition of the tournament and was held from 6 April through 12 April 1998. Eighth-seeded Kenneth Carlsen won the singles title.

== Finals ==
=== Singles ===
(Denmark) Kenneth Carlsen defeated (Zimbabwe) Byron Black, 6–2, 6–0

- It was Carlsen's first singles title of his career.

=== Doubles ===
(Zimbabwe) Byron Black / (United States) Alex O'Brien defeated (South Africa) Neville Godwin / (Finland) Tuomas Ketola, 7–5, 6–1
