= 2005 Mercedes-Benz Cup – Doubles =

Doubles
- 2005 Mercedes-Benz Cup

Final
- Champions: (United States) Rick Leach (United States) Brian MacPhie
- Runners-up: (Israel) Jonathan Erlich (Israel) Andy Ram
- Score: 6–3, 6–4

Details
- Draw: 16
- Seeds: 4

Events
Singles	Doubles
- Los Angeles Open

Bob Bryan and Mike Bryan were the defending champions, but lost in the semifinals this year.

Rick Leach and Brian MacPhie won in the final 6–3, 6–4, against Jonathan Erlich and Andy Ram.

== Seeds ==
1. (United States) Bob Bryan / (United States) Mike Bryan (semifinals)
2. (Australia) Wayne Arthurs / (Australia) Paul Hanley (first round)
3. (Sweden) Simon Aspelin / (Australia) Todd Perry (first round, retired)
4. (Israel) Jonathan Erlich / (Israel) Andy Ram (final)

== Draw ==
Key

- Q = Qualifier
- WC = Wild card
- LL = Lucky loser
- Alt = Alternate
- ITF = ITF entry
- PR = Protected ranking
- SR = Special ranking
- SE = Special exempt
- JE = Junior exempt
- JR = Junior Accelerator Programme entrant
- CO = College Accelerator Programme entrant
- NG = Next Gen Accelerator Program entrant
- w/o = Walkover
- r = Retired
- d = Defaulted

=== Draw ===
First round
1	(United States) B Bryan (United States) M Bryan	6	6
(Brazil) R Mello (Luxembourg) G Müller	0	4
(Denmark) K Carlsen (Thailand) P Srichaphan	1	2
(United States) T Phillips (United States) J Thomas	6	6
4	(Israel) J Erlich (Israel) A Ram	6	6
(Slovakia) K Beck (South Africa) R Koenig	3	0
(Argentina) M Rodríguez (United States) V Spadea	7	5	3
(France) S Grosjean (France) C Saulnier	5	7	6
(Australia) A Fisher (Australia) S Huss	1	4
WC	(United States) J Blake (Belgium) X Malisse	6	6
(Australia) J Kerr (United States) T Parrott	6
3	(Sweden) S Aspelin (Australia) T Perry	3	r
(Slovakia) D Hrbatý (United States) G Oliver	6^{1}	6^{3}
Alt	(Czech Republic) J Hernych (Croatia) I Karlović	7^{7}	7^{7}
WC	(United States) R Leach (United States) B MacPhie	7	4	6
2	(Australia) W Arthurs (Australia) P Hanley	5	6	3

Quarterfinals
1	(United States) B Bryan (United States) M Bryan	6	6
(United States) T Phillips (United States) J Thomas	4	4
4	(Israel) J Erlich (Israel) A Ram	7^{7}	4	7
(France) S Grosjean (France) C Saulnier	6^{1}	6	5
WC	(United States) J Blake (Belgium) X Malisse	4	7	3
(Australia) J Kerr (United States) T Parrott	6	5	6
Alt	(Czech Republic) J Hernych (Croatia) I Karlović	2	6^{5}
WC	(United States) R Leach (United States) B MacPhie	6	7^{7}

Semifinals
1	(United States) B Bryan (United States) M Bryan	3	2
4	(Israel) J Erlich (Israel) A Ram	6	6
(Australia) J Kerr (United States) T Parrott	6^{4}	3
WC	(United States) R Leach (United States) B MacPhie	7^{7}	6

Final
4	(Israel) J Erlich (Israel) A Ram	3	4
WC	(United States) R Leach (United States) B MacPhie	6	6
