= 1994 Nuveen Championships =

1994 tennis tournament in Arizona, United States

- Date: February 21–28
- Edition: 7th
- Category: World Series
- Draw: 32S / 16D
- Prize money: $288,750
- Surface: Hard / outdoor
- Location: Scottsdale, United States

Champions

Singles
- (United States) Andre Agassi

Doubles
- (Sweden) Jan Apell / (United States) Ken Flach
- Tennis Channel Open

The 1994 Nuveen Championships was an Association of Tennis Professionals men's tennis tournament played on outdoor hard courts in Scottsdale, Arizona in the United States that was part of the World Series of the 1994 ATP Tour. It was the seventh edition of the tournament and was held from February 21 through February 28, 1994. Fifth-seeded Andre Agassi, who entered on a wildcard, won his second consecutive singles title at the event and earned $42,000 first-prize money.

== Finals ==
=== Singles ===
(United States) Andre Agassi defeated (Brazil) Luiz Mattar 6–4, 6–3

- It was Agassi's 1st title of the year and the 21st of his career.

=== Doubles ===
(Sweden) Jan Apell / (United States) Ken Flach defeated (United States) Alex O'Brien / (Australia) Sandon Stolle 6–0, 6–4

- It was Apell's 1st title of the year and the 2nd of his career. It was Flach's only title of the year and the 34th of his career.
