= Albert Costa =

Spanish tennis player (born 1975)

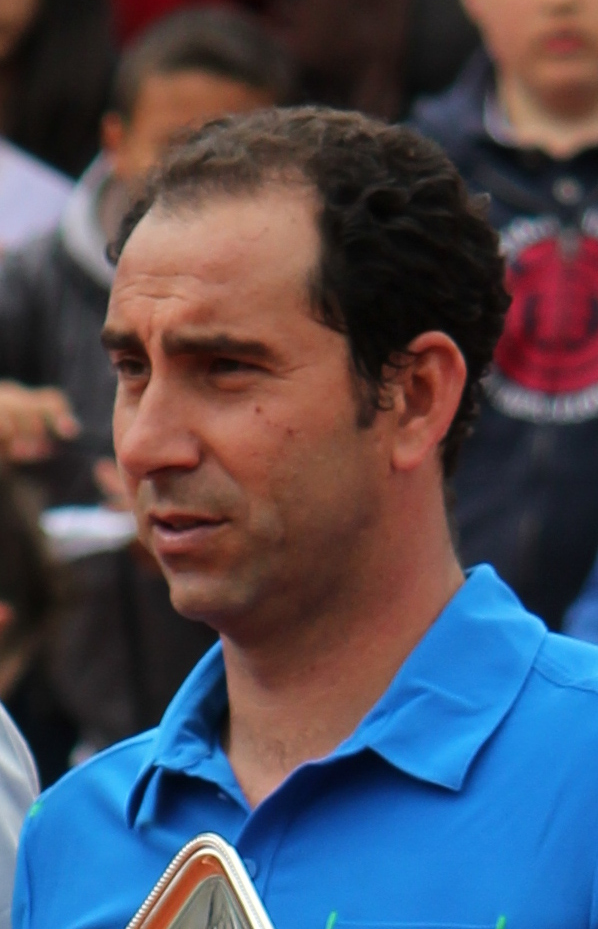
- Albert Costa in 2012
- Country (sports): Spain
- Born: 25 June 1975 (age 50) Lleida, Spain
- Height: 1.80 m (5 ft 11 in)
- Turned pro: 1993
- Retired: 2006
- Plays: Right-handed (one-handed backhand)
- Prize money: $7,673,478

Singles
- Career record: 385–273 (58.5%)
- Career titles: 12
- Highest ranking: No. 6 (22 July 2002)

Grand Slam singles results
- Australian Open: QF (1997)
- French Open: W (2002)
- Wimbledon: 2R (1996, 1998)
- US Open: 4R (2001)

Other tournaments
- Tour Finals: RR (1998, 2002)
- Olympic Games: 2R (1996)

Doubles
- Career record: 30–57 (34.5%)
- Career titles: 1
- Highest ranking: No. 102 (12 January 2004)

Grand Slam doubles results
- Australian Open: 3R (2005)
- Wimbledon: 1R (2003)
- US Open: 1R (2003)

Team competitions
- Davis Cup: W (2000)
Medal record
Representing Spain
Men's Tennis
Bronze medal – third place	2000 Sydney	Doubles

Albert Costa Casals (Catalan pronunciation: [əlˈβɛɾ(t) ˈkɔstəj kəˈzals]; born 25 June 1975) is a Spanish former professional tennis player. He is best remembered for winning the men's singles title at the French Open in 2002.

== Tennis career ==
Costa began playing tennis at the age of five. He first gained attention as an outstanding junior player, reaching the French Open junior final and winning the Orange Bowl in 1993. He turned professional later that year and quickly established a reputation as a strong clay court player. Spanish former player and commentator Andrés Gimeno referred to him as "the man with two forehands", because of his ability to hit forehands and backhands with same accuracy and strength. In 1994, he won two challenger events and was named the ATP's Newcomer of the Year.

In 1995, Costa won his first top-level singles title at Kitzbühel, defeating "King of Clay", Thomas Muster, in a five set final, beating Muster "with a mix of good ground shots, well-judged drop and slice winners and simple stamina in long baseline duels". It was Muster's first of 2 losses on clay in 1995. Costa ended Muster's streak of 40 consecutive clay match wins and his 11 consecutive final wins. Costa won three further titles in 1996. In 1997, he claimed two singles titles and was part of the Spanish team that won the World Team Cup. In 1998, he won another two singles titles, including the Tennis Masters Series event in Hamburg. He won three more titles in 1999.

In 2000, Costa was part of the Spanish team that won its first Davis Cup. Although he was eliminated in the first round in men's singles, he also won a bronze medal in the men's doubles at the 2000 Olympic Games in Sydney, partnering Álex Corretja.

At the 2002 French Open, Costa had not won a tour title since 1999 and was seeded 20th, he defeated Richard Gasquet, Nikolay Davydenko and Andrea Gaudenzi to reach the fourth round, where he defeated two time defending-champion and former world No. 1 Gustavo Kuerten in straight sets. Costa followed up with a five-set victory over Argentina's Guillermo Cañas in the quarterfinals. He then defeated fellow-Spaniard, former world No. 2 and long-time friend Àlex Corretja in a four-set semifinal. In the final, Costa came up against another Spaniard, future world No. 1, Juan Carlos Ferrero. Ferrero had been in fine form in the run-up to the event and most observers considered him to be the heavy favourite going into the final. But Costa won in four sets to claim his first Grand Slam title. Costa destroyed Ferrero, who could only win nine points during Costa's service games in the first 2 sets. "It was the best match of my life" said Costa afterwards. The win propelled him to his career-high singles ranking of World No. 6 in July 2002.

Coming into the 2003 French Open as the defending champion, Albert Costa spent a total of 21 hours and 15 minutes on court, winning four five-setters before eventually being knocked out in a semifinal by Ferrero (who went on to win the title). Coincidentally, the match between Costa and Ferrero was a rematch of the previous year's final.

Over the course of his career, Costa won 12 top-level singles titles. In 2005, he claimed his first ATP tour doubles title in Doha, partnering with Rafael Nadal.

Plagued by recurring injuries and a lack of desire, he officially announced his retirement from competitive professional tennis on 21 April 2006, at the completion of the Open Seat 2006 in his hometown in Barcelona. In his final tournament, Costa defeated American Vincent Spadea and Slovak Dominik Hrbatý before losing 6–1, 5–7, 7–5 to Ferrero in the third round.

In December 2008, Costa succeeded Emilio Sánchez Vicario as Spain's Davis Cup captain. Costa became the most successful Spanish Davis Cup captain to date as he led Spain to two Davis Cup titles in 2009 and 2011, before handing the captaincy over to Àlex Corretja.

Following his captaincy, Costa took up coaching duties, working with ATP professional Feliciano López.

== Personal life ==
He grew up idolising John McEnroe. Beyond tennis, he enjoys playing cards, table tennis, golf, and soccer. He is also a fan of Barcelona and his hometown club, UE Lleida. He also admires sporting legends such as Michael Jordan, Tiger Woods, and Ronaldo.

Less than a week after his victory at the 2002 French Open, Costa married his long-time girlfriend, Cristina Ventura. Àlex Corretja was the best man at the wedding. The couple have twin daughters, Claudia and Alma, born on 21 April 2001.

== Career statistics ==
=== Grand Slam singles performance timeline ===
Key
W	F	SF	QF	#R	RR	Q#	DNQ	A	NH

(W) winner; (F) finalist; (SF) semifinalist; (QF) quarterfinalist; (#R) rounds 4, 3, 2, 1; (RR) round-robin stage; (Q#) qualification round; (DNQ) did not qualify; (A) absent; (NH) not held; (SR) strike rate (events won / competed); (W–L) win–loss record.

Tournament	1993	1994	1995	1996	1997	1998	1999	2000	2001	2002	2003	2004	2005	2006	SR	W–L
Australian Open	A	A	A	2R	QF	2R	1R	1R	A	4R	3R	3R	1R	A	0 / 9	13–9
French Open	A	1R	QF	2R	3R	4R	3R	QF	1R	W	SF	3R	1R	A	1 / 12	30–11
Wimbledon	A	1R	A	2R	A	2R	1R	A	A	A	A	1R	A	A	0 / 5	2–5
US Open	A	1R	A	1R	1R	1R	1R	2R	4R	2R	2R	1R	1R	A	0 / 11	6–11
Win–loss	0–0	0–3	4–1	3–4	6–3	5–4	2–4	5–3	3–2	11–2	8–3	4–4	0–3	0–0	1 / 37	51–36

=== Finals (1 title) ===
Result	Year	Championship	Surface	Opponent	Score
Win	2002	French Open	Clay	(Spain) Juan Carlos Ferrero	6–1, 6–0, 4–6, 6–3

=== Year-End Championship performance timeline ===
Tournament	1993	1994	1995	1996	1997	1998	1999	2000	2001	2002	2003	2004	2005	2006	SR	W–L
Year-End Championship
Tennis Masters Cup	Did not qualify					RR	Did not qualify			RR	Did not qualify				0 / 2	1–4

== See also ==
- List of Grand Slam men's singles champions
