= 1994 Nuveen Championships – Doubles =

Tennis tournament

Doubles
- 1994 Tennis Channel Open

Final
- Champions: (Sweden) Jan Apell (United States) Ken Flach
- Runners-up: (United States) Alex O'Brien (Australia) Sandon Stolle
- Score: 6–0, 6–4

Events
Singles	Doubles
← 1993 ·	Tennis Channel Open	· 1995 →

Mark Keil and Dave Randall were the defending champions, but lost in the first round this year.

Jan Apell and Ken Flach won the title, defeating Alex O'Brien and Sandon Stolle 6–0, 6–4 in the final.

== Seeds ==
1. (Spain) Sergio Casal / (Spain) Emilio Sánchez (quarterfinals)
2. (Sweden) Jan Apell / (United States) Ken Flach (champions)
3. (Spain) Javier Sánchez / (Australia) Mark Woodforde (first round)
4. (Australia) Mark Kratzmann / (Australia) Patrick Rafter (first round)

== Draw ==
=== Key ===
- Q = Qualifier
- WC = Wild card
- LL = Lucky loser
- Alt = Alternate
- SE = Special exempt
- PR = Protected ranking
- ITF = ITF entry
- JE = Junior exempt
- w/o = Walkover
- r = Retired
- d = Defaulted
- SR = Special ranking

=== Draw ===
First round
1	(Spain) S Casal (Spain) E Sánchez	7	7
(South Africa) J-L de Jager (United States) B Pearce	5	5
Q	(Canada) D Nestor (Australia) M Tebbutt	3	2
(United States) A O'Brien (Australia) S Stolle	6	6
3	(Spain) J Sánchez (Australia) M Woodforde	4	6	3
(United States) M Briggs (United States) S Davis	6	3	6
(United States) S Cannon (South Africa) B Talbot	7	6
WC	(United States) B Gilbert (United States) M Washington	5	2
(United States) M Keil (United States) D Randall	3	3
(United States) S DeVries (Australia) D Macpherson	6	6
(United States) D Pate (South Africa) D Visser	6	6
4	(Australia) M Kratzmann (Australia) P Rafter	3	2
(South Africa) S Kruger (United States) S Melville	6	2	7
(United States) J Pugh (Australia) L Warder	3	6	5
WC	(Sweden) N Kroon (Sweden) M Wilander	4	4
2	(Sweden) J Apell (United States) K Flach	6	6

Quarterfinals
1	(Spain) S Casal (Spain) E Sánchez	6	4
(United States) A O'Brien (Australia) S Stolle	7	6
(United States) M Briggs (United States) S Davis	7	6
(United States) S Cannon (South Africa) B Talbot	6	2
(United States) S DeVries (Australia) D Macpherson	7	6
(United States) D Pate (South Africa) D Visser	6	4
(South Africa) S Kruger (United States) S Melville	1	6
2	(Sweden) J Apell (United States) K Flach	6	7

Semifinals
(United States) A O'Brien (Australia) S Stolle	6	7
(United States) M Briggs (United States) S Davis	1	5
(United States) S DeVries (Australia) D Macpherson	1	6
2	(Sweden) J Apell (United States) K Flach	6	7

Final
(United States) A O'Brien (Australia) S Stolle	0	4
2	(Sweden) J Apell (United States) K Flach	6	6
