= 1998 Salem Open – Singles =

Singles
- 1998 Salem Open

Final
- Champion: (Denmark) Kenneth Carlsen
- Runner-up: (Zimbabwe) Byron Black
- Score: 6–2, 6–0

Details
- Draw: 32
- Seeds: 8

Events
Singles	Doubles
← 1997 ·	Salem Open	· 1999 →

The 1998 Salem Open was a men's tennis tournament played on Hard courts in Hong Kong that was part of the International Series of the 1998 ATP Tour. It was the 23rd edition of the tournament and was held from 6–12 April 1998.

== Seeds ==
Champion seeds are indicated in bold text while text in italics indicates the round in which those seeds were eliminated.

1. (United States) Michael Chang (first round)
2. (Germany) Tommy Haas (first round)
3. (Sweden) Thomas Johansson (semifinals)
4. (New Zealand) Brett Steven (first round)
5. (United States) Vince Spadea (second round)
6. (Czech Republic) Martin Damm (second round)
7. (Italy) Gianluca Pozzi (quarterfinals)
8. (Denmark) **Kenneth Carlsen (champion)**

== Draw ==
Key

- Q = Qualifier
- WC = Wild card
- LL = Lucky loser
- Alt = Alternate
- ITF = ITF entry
- PR = Protected ranking
- SR = Special ranking
- SE = Special exempt
- JE = Junior exempt
- JR = Junior Accelerator Programme entrant
- CO = College Accelerator Programme entrant
- NG = Next Gen Accelerator Program entrant
- w/o = Walkover
- r = Retired
- d = Defaulted

=== Finals ===
Semifinals
**(Zimbabwe) Byron Black**	6^{5}	**7**	**7**
(Canada) Sébastien Lareau	**7**	5	6^{4}
3	(Sweden) Thomas Johansson	2	2
8	**(Denmark) Kenneth Carlsen**	**6**	**6**

Final
8	**(Denmark) Kenneth Carlsen**	**6**	**6**
(Zimbabwe) Byron Black	2	0

=== Top half ===
First round
**(Germany) C Vinck**	**6**	3	**6**
1	(United States) M Chang	4	**6**	1
**(Zimbabwe) B Black**	6^{3}	**7**	**6**
(Germany) H Dreekmann	**7**	5	2
**(Germany) D Prinosil**	6^{7}	**6**	**6**
(Italy) S Pescosolido	**7**	0	1
7	**(Italy) G Pozzi**	**7**	**7**
(Finland) T Ketola	5	5
**(Canada) S Lareau**	**6**	6^{5}	**6**
4	(New Zealand) B Steven	4	**7**	3
**(Canada) D Nestor**	**6**	**7**
(United States) B MacPhie	4	5
**(Spain) Ó Burrieza**	**6**	**7**
(Australia) M Tebbutt	3	6^{3}
6	**(Czech Republic) M Damm**	**6**	**7**
(Czech Republic) D Vacek	4	6^{7}

Second round
(Germany) C Vinck	1	2
**(Zimbabwe) B Black**	**6**	**6**
(Germany) D Prinosil	4	6^{4}
7	**(Italy) G Pozzi**	**6**	**7**
**(Canada) S Lareau**	**7**	**6**
(Canada) D Nestor	6^{5}	3
**(Spain) Ó Burrieza**	**6**	**6**
6	(Czech Republic) M Damm	4	4

Quarterfinals
**(Zimbabwe) B Black**	**6**	**6**
7	(Italy) G Pozzi	4	0
**(Canada) S Lareau**	**6**	**7**
(Spain) Ó Burrieza	1	6^{4}

Semifinals
**(Zimbabwe) B Black**	6^{5}	**7**	**7**
(Canada) S Lareau	**7**	5	6^{4}

=== Bottom half ===
First round
**(Australia) S Stolle**	**6**	**6**
5	(United States) V Spadea	1	3
**(Australia) B Ellwood**	**6**	**6**
(Hong Kong) W Wong	1	2
**(United States) D Wheaton**	**7**	3
(France) A Boetsch	5	1	R
3	**(Sweden) T Johansson**	6^{2}	**6**	**6**
(United States) S Campbell	**7**	0	3
8	**(Denmark) K Carlsen**	**7**	**6**
(Sweden) P Nyborg	5	3
**(United States) G Grant**	**7**	**6**
(United States) A O'Brien	5	1
**(Japan) G Motomura**	**7**	0	**7**
(Czech Republic) R Vašek	6^{2}	**6**	6^{1}
**(South Africa) N Godwin**	**6**	**6**
2	(Germany) T Haas	3	4

Second round
**(Australia) S Stolle**	**7**	**6**
(Australia) B Ellwood	6^{5}	4
(United States) D Wheaton	3	**6**	1
3	**(Sweden) T Johansson**	**6**	3	**6**
8	**(Denmark) K Carlsen**	3	**7**	**6**
(United States) G Grant	**6**	'6^{3}	4
(Japan) G Motomura	3	**6**	0
**(South Africa) N Godwin**	**6**	4	**6**

Quarterfinals
(Australia) S Stolle	6^{6}	5
3	**(Sweden) T Johansson**	**7**	**7**
8	**(Denmark) K Carlsen**	**7**	**6**
(South Africa) N Godwin	5	1

Semifinals
3	(Sweden) T Johansson	2	2
8	**(Denmark) K Carlsen**	**6**	**6**
