= 2000 Tennis Masters Cup – Singles =

Singles
- 2000 Tennis Masters Cup

Final
- Champion: (Brazil) Gustavo Kuerten
- Runner-up: (United States) Andre Agassi
- Score: 6–4, 6–4, 6–4

Details
- Draw: 8

Events
Singles	Doubles
← 1999 ·	ATP Finals	· 2001 →

Gustavo Kuerten defeated Andre Agassi in the final, 6–4, 6–4, 6–4 to win the singles tennis title at the 2000 Tennis Masters Cup. With the win, Kuerten became the year-end No. 1, and became the first South American to make the achievement.

Pete Sampras was the defending champion, but was defeated in the semifinals by Kuerten.

== Seeds ==
1. (Russia) Marat Safin (semifinals)
2. (Brazil) Gustavo Kuerten (champion)
3. (United States) Pete Sampras (semifinals)
4. (Sweden) Magnus Norman (round robin)
5. (Russia) Yevgeny Kafelnikov (round robin)
6. (Australia) Lleyton Hewitt (round robin)
7. (Spain) Àlex Corretja (round robin)
8. (United States) Andre Agassi (final)

== Alternate ==
1. (Sweden) Thomas Enqvist (Did not play)

== Draw ==
=== Key ===
- Q = Qualifier
- WC = Wild card
- LL = Lucky loser
- Alt = Alternate
- SE = Special exempt
- PR = Protected ranking
- ITF = ITF entry
- JE = Junior exempt
- w/o = Walkover
- r = Retired
- d = Defaulted
- SR = Special ranking

=== Finals ===
Semifinals
3	(United States) Pete Sampras	7^{7}	3	4
2	(Brazil) Gustavo Kuerten	6^{5}	6	6
8	(United States) Andre Agassi	6	6
1	(Russia) Marat Safin	3	3

Final
2	(Brazil) Gustavo Kuerten	6	6	6
8	(United States) Andre Agassi	4	4	4

=== Red group ===
		(Russia) Safin	(United States) Sampras	(Australia) Hewitt	(Spain) Corretja	RR; W–L	Set; W–L	Game; W–L	Standings
1	(Russia) Marat Safin		3–6, 2–6	6–4, 6–4	6–7^{(6–8)}, 7–5, 6–3	2–1	4–3	36–35	2
3	(United States) Pete Sampras	6–3, 6–2		5–7, 0–6	7–6^{(7–2)}, 7–5	2–1	4–2	31–29	1
6	(Australia) Lleyton Hewitt	4–6, 4–6	7–5, 6–0		6–3, 6–7^{(3–7)}, 3–6	1–2	3–4	36–33	4
7	(Spain) Álex Corretja	7–6^{(8–6)}, 5–7, 3–6	6–7^{(2–7)}, 5–7	3–6, 7–6^{(7–3)}, 6–3		1–2	3–5	42–48	3

Standings are determined by: 1. number of wins; 2. number of matches; 3. in two-players-ties, head-to-head records; 4. in three-players-ties, percentage of sets won, or of games won; 5. steering-committee decision.

=== Green group ===
		(Brazil) Kuerten	(Sweden) Norman	(Russia) Kafelnikov	(United States) Agassi	RR; W–L	Set; W–L	Game; W–L	Standings
2	(Brazil) Gustavo Kuerten		7–5, 6–3	6–3, 6–4	6–4, 4–6, 3–6	2–1	5–2	38–31	2
4	(Sweden) Magnus Norman	5–7, 3–6		6–4, 5–7, 1–6	3–6, 2–6	0–3	1–6	25–42	4
5	(Russia) Yevgeny Kafelnikov	3–6, 4–6	4–6, 7–5, 6–1		1–6, 4–6	1–2	2–5	29–36	3
8	(United States) Andre Agassi	4–6, 6–4, 6–3	6–3, 6–2	6–1, 6–4		3–0	6–1	40–23	1

Standings are determined by: 1. number of wins; 2. number of matches; 3. in two-players-ties, head-to-head records; 4. in three-players-ties, percentage of sets won, or of games won; 5. steering-committee decision.

== See also ==
- ATP World Tour Finals appearances
