= 1998 Salem Open – Doubles =

Doubles
- 1998 Salem Open

Final
- Champions: (Zimbabwe) Byron Black (United States) Alex O'Brien
- Runners-up: (South Africa) Neville Godwin (Finland) Tuomas Ketola
- Score: 7–5, 6–1

Details
- Draw: 16
- Seeds: 4

Events
| Singles | Doubles |
- Salem Open

The 1998 Salem Open was a men's tennis tournament played on Hard courts in Hong Kong that was part of the International Series of the 1998 ATP Tour. It was the 23rd edition of the tournament and was held from 6–12 April 1998.

== Seeds ==
Champion seeds are indicated in bold text while text in italics indicates the round in which those seeds were eliminated.

1. Unknown (withdrew)
2. (Canada) Sébastien Lareau / (Canada) Daniel Nestor (first round)
3. (Zimbabwe) **Byron Black** / (United States) **Alex O'Brien (champions)**
4. (United States) Brian MacPhie / (Australia) Sandon Stolle (first round)

== Draw ==
Key

- Q = Qualifier
- WC = Wild card
- LL = Lucky loser
- Alt = Alternate
- ITF = ITF entry
- PR = Protected ranking
- SR = Special ranking
- SE = Special exempt
- JE = Junior exempt
- JR = Junior Accelerator Programme entrant
- CO = College Accelerator Programme entrant
- NG = Next Gen Accelerator Program entrant
- w/o = Walkover
- r = Retired
- d = Defaulted

=== Finals ===
First round
(Czechoslovakia) **M Damm** **(Czech Republic) D Vacek** | **6** | 4 | **6**
(United States) S Davis (Australia) M Tebbutt | 4 | **6** | 2
(Japan) **M Takada** **(Japan) R Tsujino** | **6** | **6**
(United States) G Grant (United States) K Kinnear | 1 | 2
(Australia) **J Holmes** **(Australia) A Town** | **7** | 4 | **7**
4 | (United States) B MacPhie (Australia) S Stolle | 6 | **6** | 5
(South Africa) **N Godwin** **(Finland) T Ketola** | **6** | **6**
(United Kingdom) D Sapsford (United Kingdom) C Wilkinson | 3 | 4
(South Africa) **C Haggard** **(South Africa) P Rosner** | **7** | **6**
(Sweden) P Nyborg (Germany) D Prinosil | 6 | 4
3 | (Zimbabwe) **B Black** **(United States) A O'Brien** | **6** | **6**
(United States) M Keil (United States) T. J. Middleton | 1 | 1
(Australia) **B Ellwood** **(Sweden) K Flygt** | **6** | **7**
(Mexico) B Martínez (United States) V Spadea | 3 | 6
(Sweden) **F Bergh** **(Sweden) T Johansson** | **6** | **6**
2 | (Canada) S Lareau (Canada) D Nestor | 3 | 3

Quarterfinals
(Czechoslovakia) **M Damm** **(Czech Republic) D Vacek** | **6** | **6**
(Japan) M Takada (Japan) R Tsujino | 3 | 1
(Australia) J Holmes (Australia) A Town | 2 | 1
(South Africa) **N Godwin** **(Finland) T Ketola** | **6** | **6**
(South Africa) C Haggard (South Africa) P Rosner | 4 | 4
3 | (Zimbabwe) **B Black** **(United States) A O'Brien** | **6** | **6**
(Australia) B Ellwood (Sweden) K Flygt | 2 | 2
(Sweden) **F Bergh** **(Sweden) T Johansson** | **6** | **6**

Semifinals
(Czechoslovakia) M Damm (Czech Republic) D Vacek | 4 | **6** | 6
(South Africa) **N Godwin** **(Finland) T Ketola** | **6** | 0 | **7**
3 | (Zimbabwe) **B Black** **(United States) A O'Brien** | **6** | **6**
(Sweden) F Bergh (Sweden) T Johansson | 3 | 0

Final
(South Africa) N Godwin (Finland) T Ketola | 5 | 1
3 | (Zimbabwe) **B Black** **(United States) A O'Brien** | **7** | **6**
