= Andy Town =

- Full name: Andrew Richard Town
- Born: 13 August 1941 (age 85) Mosman, Sydney, Australia
- School: Sydney Grammar School

Rugby union career
- Position: Fly-half
Provincial / State sides
Years	Team	Apps	(Points)
1963–65	New South Wales		
International career
Years	Team	Apps	(Points)
1962	Australia		

Andrew Richard Town (born 13 August 1941) is an Australian former international rugby union player.

Born in the Sydney suburb of Mosman, Town had a year in the 1st XV at Sydney Grammar School and came through the Northern Suburbs junior grades to play for their senior side. He was an attacking fly-half.

Town had yet to represent his state when he was chosen by the Wallabies for the 1962 tour of New Zealand, having impressed during the trials. A twisted ankle prior to departure hampered him in New Zealand and he featured in only three tour matches, with Phil Hawthorne the Test fly-half. Due to work commitments, Town declared himself unavailable for the 1963 tour of South Africa, before gaining his only other Wallabies call up as a reserve in 1964. He was a member of the 1963 and 1964 Northern Suburbs first-grade premiership-winning teams.

== See also ==
- List of Australia national rugby union players
