= 1994 Nuveen Championships – Singles =

Tennis tournament

Singles
- 1994 Tennis Channel Open

Final
- Champion: (United States) Andre Agassi
- Runner-up: (Brazil) Luiz Mattar
- Score: 6–4, 6–3

Details
- Draw: 32
- Seeds: 8

Events
Singles	Doubles
- Tennis Channel Open

Fifth-seeded Andre Agassi successfully defended his title, defeating Luiz Mattar 6–4, 6–3 in the final.

== Seeds ==
1. (Sweden) Stefan Edberg (first round)
2. (United States) MaliVai Washington (semifinals)
3. (United States) Brad Gilbert (quarterfinals)
4. (Australia) Mark Woodforde (first round)
5. (United States) Andre Agassi (champion)
6. (Spain) Javier Sánchez (first round)
7. (United States) Aaron Krickstein (second round)
8. (Russia) Andrei Cherkasov (first round)

== Draw ==
Key

- Q = Qualifier
- WC = Wild card
- LL = Lucky loser
- Alt = Alternate
- ITF = ITF entry
- PR = Protected ranking
- SR = Special ranking
- SE = Special exempt
- JE = Junior exempt
- JR = Junior Accelerator Programme entrant
- CO = College Accelerator Programme entrant
- NG = Next Gen Accelerator Program entrant
- w/o = Walkover
- r = Retired
- d = Defaulted

=== Finals ===
Semifinals
(Germany) Karsten Braasch	1	4
WC/5	(United States) Andre Agassi	6	6
(Brazil) Luiz Mattar	3	6	6
2	(United States) MaliVai Washington	6	3	3

Final
WC/5	(United States) Andre Agassi	6	6
(Brazil) Luiz Mattar	4	3

=== Top half ===
First round
1	(Sweden) S Edberg	2	3
(Spain) J Burillo	6	6
(France) F Santoro	6	5	6
(United States) A O'Brien	3	7	3
(Germany) K Braasch	7^{7}	6
(Australia) S Stolle	6^{4}	3
WC	(United States) V Spadea	3	4
7	(United States) A Krickstein	6	6
3	(United States) B Gilbert	6	6
(Sweden) J Apell	3	3
Q	(Canada) A Sznajder	4	4
(Sweden) N Kulti	6	6
Q	(Czech Republic) L Němeček	7^{7}	6
(Australia) J Morgan	6^{4}	0
Q	(United States) M Keil	1	2
WC/5	(United States) A Agassi	6	6

Second round
(Spain) J Burillo	6	6
(France) F Santoro	4	2
(Germany) K Braasch	2	7^{7}	7^{7}
7	(United States) A Krickstein	6	6^{3}	6^{4}
3	(United States) B Gilbert	7	6
(Sweden) N Kulti	5	3
Q	(Czech Republic) L Němeček	4	3
WC/5	(United States) A Agassi	6	6

Quarterfinals
(Spain) J Burillo	3	5
(Germany) K Braasch	6	7
3	(United States) B Gilbert	1	2
WC/5	(United States) A Agassi	6	6

Semifinals
(Germany) K Braasch	1	4
WC/5	(United States) A Agassi	6	6

=== Bottom half ===
First round
6	(Spain) J Sánchez	3	5
(Brazil) L Mattar	6	7
(South Africa) G Stafford	6	6
WC	(Sweden) M Wilander	2	2
(United States) C Adams	7	6
(Spain) E Sánchez	5	2
(Zimbabwe) B Black	6	6
4	(Australia) M Woodforde	4	3
8	(Russia) A Cherkasov	4	1
(Italy) S Pescosolido	6	6
Q	(Canada) D Nestor	3	2
(United States) J Tarango	6	6
(United States) J Palmer	6	6
(Germany) B Karbacher	4	4
(Australia) P Rafter	6	2	6^{4}
2	(United States) M Washington	4	6	7^{7}

Second round
(Brazil) L Mattar	4	6	6
(South Africa) G Stafford	6	3	2
(United States) C Adams	6	6
(Zimbabwe) B Black	1	4
(Italy) S Pescosolido	6	6^{10}	6
(United States) J Tarango	3	7^{12}	4
(United States) J Palmer	3	6	3
2	(United States) M Washington	6	2	6

Quarterfinals
(Brazil) L Mattar	7^{8}	6
(United States) C Adams	6^{6}	4
(Italy) S Pescosolido	6^{3}	2
2	(United States) M Washington	7^{7}	6

Semifinals
(Brazil) L Mattar	3	6	6
2	(United States) M Washington	6	3	3
