= 2005 Mercedes-Benz Cup – Singles =

Singles
- 2005 Mercedes-Benz Cup

Final
- Champion: (United States) Andre Agassi
- Runner-up: (Luxembourg) Gilles Müller
- Score: 6–4, 7–5

Details
- Draw: 32 (4 Q / 3 WC )
- Seeds: 8

Events
Singles	Doubles
- Los Angeles Open

Tommy Haas was the defending champion, but lost in the second round to Xavier Malisse.

Andre Agassi won the tournament, beating Gilles Müller in the final, 6–4, 7–5.

== Seeds ==
1. (United States) Andre Agassi (champion)
2. (Slovakia) Dominik Hrbatý (semifinals)
3. (Germany) Nicolas Kiefer (first round, retired due to a throat infection)
4. (Germany) Tommy Haas (second round)
5. ~~(United States) Taylor Dent~~ (withdrew due to heat exhaustion)
6. (Croatia) Mario Ančić (first round)
7. (France) Sébastien Grosjean (first round)
8. ~~(United Kingdom) Greg Rusedski~~ (withdrew due to a neck injury)
9. (United States) Vincent Spadea (first round)

== Draw ==
Key

- Q = Qualifier
- WC = Wild card
- LL = Lucky loser
- Alt = Alternate
- ITF = ITF entry
- PR = Protected ranking
- SR = Special ranking
- SE = Special exempt
- JE = Junior exempt
- JR = Junior Accelerator Programme entrant
- CO = College Accelerator Programme entrant
- NG = Next Gen Accelerator Program entrant
- w/o = Walkover
- r = Retired
- d = Defaulted

=== Finals ===
Semifinals
1	(United States) Andre Agassi	6	6
(Argentina) Juan Ignacio Chela	4	2
(Luxembourg) Gilles Müller	4	7^{7}	6
2	(Slovakia) Dominik Hrbatý	6	6^{4}	1

Final
1	(United States) Andre Agassi	6	7
(Luxembourg) Gilles Müller	4	5

=== Top half ===
First round
1	(United States) A Agassi	6	6
LL	(France) J-R Lisnard	1	0
(Denmark) K Carlsen	6^{2}	7^{7}	4
(United States) K Kim	7^{7}	6^{3}	6
WC	(United States) P Goldstein	6	6
(France) C Saulnier	4	4
(Thailand) P Srichaphan	7^{8}	6^{4}	6
6	(Croatia) M Ančić	6^{6}	7^{7}	2
4	(Germany) T Haas	6	6
(Croatia) I Karlović	4	4
(Belgium) X Malisse	6	6
(South Korea) H-t Lee	3	4
(Argentina) JI Chela	6^{7}	6	6
(Cyprus) M Baghdatis	7^{9}	3	4
LL	(Israel) N Okun	1	2
LL	(Russia) D Tursunov	6	6

Second round
1	(United States) A Agassi	6	7
(United States) K Kim	2	5
WC	(United States) P Goldstein	1	4
(Thailand) P Srichaphan	6	6
4	(Germany) T Haas	6	3	4
(Belgium) X Malisse	1	6	6
(Argentina) JI Chela	3	6	6
LL	(Russia) D Tursunov	6	4	2

Quarterfinals
1	(United States) A Agassi	6	4	6
(Thailand) P Srichaphan	2	6	4
(Belgium) X Malisse	4	6^{3}
(Argentina) JI Chela	6	7^{7}

Semifinals
1	(United States) A Agassi	6	6
(Argentina) JI Chela	4	2

=== Bottom half ===
First round
9	(United States) V Spadea	6	2	4
Q	(United States) Z Fleishman	4	6	6
(Luxembourg) G Müller	2	6	7^{8}
Q	(France) S de Chaunac	6	3	6^{6}
(United States) R Ginepri	6	6
(Australia) W Arthurs	4	4
WC	(United States) J Blake	3
3	(Germany) N Kiefer	2^{r}
7	(France) S Grosjean	6	2	3
(Brazil) R Mello	1	6	6
Q	(Israel) A Hadad	2	6	6
WC	(United States) C Mamiit	6	3	3
Q	(Sweden) J Björkman	4	4
(Czech Republic) J Hernych	6	6
(Slovakia) K Beck	4	1
2	(Slovakia) D Hrbatý	6	6

Second round
Q	(United States) Z Fleishman	3	5
(Luxembourg) G Müller	6	7
(United States) R Ginepri	6	7^{7}
WC	(United States) J Blake	3	6^{2}
(Brazil) R Mello	6	6
Q	(Israel) A Hadad	3	1
(Czech Republic) J Hernych	4	2
2	(Slovakia) D Hrbatý	6	6

Quarterfinals
(Luxembourg) G Müller	7^{7}	7
(United States) R Ginepri	6^{5}	5
(Brazil) R Mello	6	6^{9}	2
2	(Slovakia) D Hrbatý	4	7^{11}	6

Semifinals
(Luxembourg) G Müller	4	7^{7}	6
2	(Slovakia) D Hrbatý	6	6^{4}	1
