= 1998 ATP Tour World Championships – Singles =

Singles
- 1998 ATP Tour World Championships

Final
- Champion: (Spain) Àlex Corretja
- Runner-up: (Spain) Carlos Moyá
- Score: 3–6, 3–6, 7–5, 6–3, 7–5

Details
- Draw: 8

Events
Singles	Doubles
- ATP Finals

Àlex Corretja defeated Carlos Moyá in the final, 3–6, 3–6, 7–5, 6–3, 7–5 to win the singles tennis title at the 1998 ATP Tour World Championships. He was the first player to win the title without ever winning a major in his career. The final was a rematch of that year's French Open final, where Moyá prevailed.

Pete Sampras was the two-time defending champion, but was defeated in the semifinals by Corretja.

== Seeds ==
1. (United States) Pete Sampras (semifinals)
2. (Chile) Marcelo Ríos (round robin, withdrew due to a back injury)
3. (United States) Andre Agassi (round robin, retired due to a back injury)
4. (Spain) Carlos Moyá (final)
5. (Spain) Àlex Corretja (champion)
6. (Slovakia) Karol Kučera (round robin)
7. (United Kingdom) Tim Henman (semifinals)
8. (Russia) Yevgeny Kafelnikov (round robin)
9. (United Kingdom) Greg Rusedski (round robin)
10. (Spain) Albert Costa (round robin)

== Draw ==
Key

- Q = Qualifier
- WC = Wild card
- LL = Lucky loser
- Alt = Alternate
- ITF = ITF entry
- PR = Protected ranking
- SR = Special ranking
- SE = Special exempt
- JE = Junior exempt
- JR = Junior Accelerator Programme entrant
- CO = College Accelerator Programme entrant
- NG = Next Gen Accelerator Program entrant
- w/o = Walkover
- r = Retired
- d = Defaulted

=== Finals ===
Semifinals
1	(United States) Pete Sampras	6	3	6^{3}
5	(Spain) Álex Corretja	4	6	7^{7}
7	(United Kingdom) Tim Henman	4	6	5
4	(Spain) Carlos Moyá	6	3	7

Final
5	(Spain) Álex Corretja	3	3	7	6	7
4	(Spain) Carlos Moyá	6	6	5	3	5

=== Red group ===
		(United States) Sampras	(Spain) Moyá	(Slovakia) Kučera	(Russia) Kafelnikov	RR W–L	Set W–L	Game W–L	Standings
1	(United States) Pete Sampras		6–3, 6–3	6–2, 6–1	6–2, 6–4	3–0	6–0	36–15	1
4	(Spain) Carlos Moyá	3–6, 3–6		6–7^{(5–7)}, 7–5, 6–3	7–5, 7–5	2–1	4–3	39–37	2
6	(Slovakia) Karol Kučera	2–6, 1–6	7–6^{(7–5)}, 5–7, 3–6		7–6^{(7–3)}, 3–6, 2–6	0–3	2–6	30–49	4
8	(Russia) Yevgeny Kafelnikov	2–6, 4–6	5–7, 5–7	6–7^{(3–7)}, 6–3, 6–2		1–2	2–5	34–38	3

Standings are determined by: 1. number of wins; 2. number of matches; 3. in two-players-ties, head-to-head records; 4. in three-players-ties, percentage of sets won, or of games won; 5. steering-committee decision.

=== White group ===
		(Chile) Rios (Spain) Costa	(United States) Agassi (United Kingdom) Rusedski	(Spain) Corretja	(United Kingdom) Henman	RR W–L	Set W–L	Game W–L	Standings
2; 10	(Chile) Marcelo Ríos (Spain) Albert Costa		6–7^{(5–7)}, 1–6 (w/ Costa & Rusedski)	2–6, 4–6 (w/ Costa)	5–7, 1–6 (w/ Ríos)	0–1; 0–2	0–2; 0–4	6–13; 13–25	6; 4
3; 9	(United States) Andre Agassi (United Kingdom) Greg Rusedski	7–6^{(7–5)}, 6–1 (w/ Rusedski & Costa)		7–5, 3–6, 1–2^{r} (w/ Agassi)	6–2, 6–4 (w/ Rusedski)	0–1; 2–0	1–2; 4–0	11–13; 25–13	5; 3
5	(Spain) Álex Corretja	6–2, 6–4 (w/ Costa)	5–7, 6–3, 2–1^{r} (w/ Agassi)		6–7^{(4–7)}, 7–6^{(7–4)}, 2–6	2–1	5–3	40–36	2
7	(United Kingdom) Tim Henman	7–5, 6–1 (w/ Ríos)	2–6, 4–6 (w/ Rusedski)	7–6^{(7–4)}, 6–7^{(4–7)}, 6–2		2–1	4–3	38–33	1

Standings are determined by: 1. number of wins; 2. number of matches; 3. in two-players-ties, head-to-head records; 4. in three-players-ties, percentage of sets won, or of games won; 5. steering-committee decision.

== See also ==
- ATP World Tour Finals appearances
