= Gustavo Kuerten =

Brazilian tennis player (born 1976)

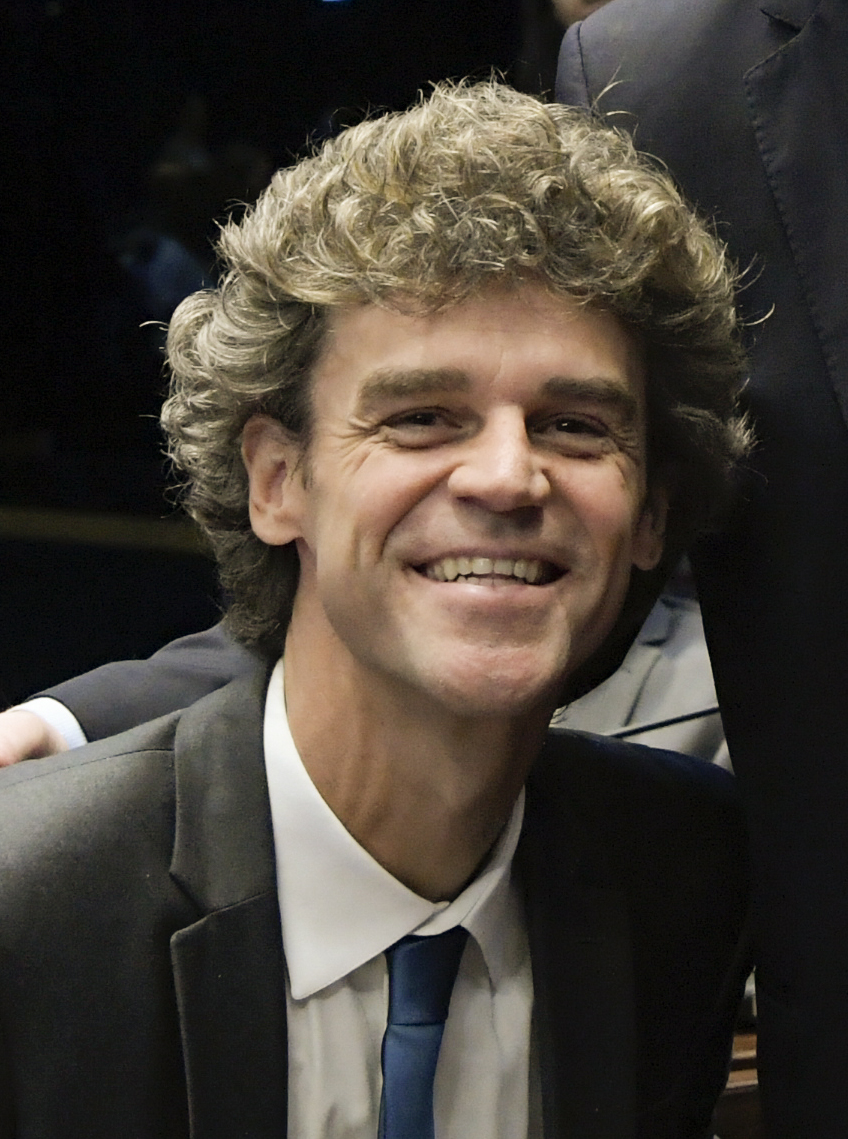
- Kuerten in 2019
- Country (sports): Brazil
- Residence: Florianópolis, Brazil
- Born: 10 September 1976 (age 50) Florianópolis, Brazil
- Height: 1.91 m (6 ft 3 in)
- Turned pro: 1995
- Retired: 2008
- Plays: Right-handed (one-handed backhand)
- Prize money: US$14,807,000
- Int. Tennis HoF: 2012 (member page)

Singles
- Career record: 358–195 (64.7%)
- Career titles: 20
- Highest ranking: No. 1 (4 December 2000)

Grand Slam singles results
- Australian Open: 3R (2004)
- French Open: W (1997, 2000, 2001)
- Wimbledon: QF (1999)
- US Open: QF (1999, 2001)

Other tournaments
- Tour Finals: W (2000)
- Grand Slam Cup: 1R (1997, 1999)
- Olympic Games: QF (2000)

Doubles
- Career record: 108–95 (53.2%)
- Career titles: 8
- Highest ranking: No. 38 (13 October 1997)

Grand Slam doubles results
- Australian Open: QF (1999)
- French Open: QF (1998)
- Wimbledon: 1R (1999, 2000)
- US Open: 1R (1997, 2003, 2004, 2007)

Team competitions
- Davis Cup: SF (2000)
Medal record
Men's tennis
Representing Brazil
South American Games
Bronze medal – third place	1994 Valencia	Singles
Bronze medal – third place	1994 Valencia	Doubles
Bronze medal – third place	1994 Valencia	Mixed doubles
Bronze medal – third place	1994 Valencia	Team

Gustavo "Guga" Kuerten (Portuguese: [ɡusˈtavu ˈkiʁtẽ]; born 10 September 1976) is a Brazilian former professional tennis player. He was ranked as the world No. 1 in men's singles by the Association of Tennis Professionals for 43 weeks, including as the year-end No. 1 in 2000. Kuerten won 20 ATP Tour-level singles titles, including three majors at the French Open in 1997, 2000, and 2001, as well as the 2000 Tennis Masters Cup. He also won eight doubles titles.

Kuerten is widely regarded as the best Brazilian tennis player of all time and is often mentioned as one of the country's biggest sportsmen ever, alongside Pelé, Ayrton Senna, Anderson Silva and others.

He was inducted into the International Tennis Hall of Fame in 2012. In 2016, Kuerten was a torch bearer for the Rio Olympics.

== Professional career ==
As a junior player in South America, Kuerten won many of the most important tournaments in the region. He often played in an age group above his.

After two years as a professional, Kuerten rose to the position of No. 2 player in Brazil, behind Fernando Meligeni, and he had his then highest point by helping the Brazil Davis Cup team defeat Austria in 1996 and reach the competition's first division, the World Group.

Following his unexpected victory in the 1997 French Open – which was not only his maiden ATP Tour victory but also the first time he had reached a professional ranking final – Kuerten had a difficult year and a half, adjusting to his sudden fame and the pressure of being expected to win. 1998 was the worst year in his career that was not related to injuries. The pressure for him to become an "ambassador" for tennis in Brazil was made evident after his early defeat to a then unknown Marat Safin in the 1998 French Open: the entire body of Brazilian journalists that had been dispatched to Paris to cover the event immediately returned home, leaving the rest of the tournament unaccounted for in Brazil.

Like many South American players, his favorite court surface is clay. He won three Grand Slam titles, all of them at the French Open, played on the red clay courts of Roland Garros. He won these titles in 1997, 2000 and 2001. In every one of the three French Open victories he defeated Russia's Yevgeny Kafelnikov in the quarterfinals and two top 10 players on his way to the title. Kuerten became the world No. 1 player in 2000.

Kuerten won at least one title a year between 1997 and 2004. The streak came to an end in 2005, when injuries and below-average performances kept him from winning tournaments. He was also a regular participant for Brazil in the Davis Cup.

=== 1997: Entering the top 10 ===
Fresh from winning a Challenger title, Kuerten unexpectedly won the 1997 French Open, the first Brazilian to win a Grand Slam singles title since Maria Bueno at the 1966 U.S. Open. The tournament was only his third grand slam, setting a record for any player in the open era, tied with Mats Wilander. He remains the only player to win a Challenger and a Grand Slam in consecutive weeks. Victories over former champions of the previous four French Opens – Thomas Muster (1995) in the third round in five sets, Yevgeny Kafelnikov (1996) in the quarterfinals in five sets and Sergi Bruguera (1993, 1994) in the final – make him the third-lowest ranked Grand Slam Champion (ranked 66th), and his victory led to him entering the Association of Tennis Professionals top 20. Only Mark Edmondson (ranked 212th) and Goran Ivanišević (ranked 125th) were ranked lower than Kuerten when winning a Grand Slam singles title.

He received his French Open trophy from former champions Björn Borg and Guillermo Vilas. When called to the stage to receive the winner's trophy, Kuerten reverently bowed a few times to his childhood idol Borg, who was waiting at the top of the stairs to shake his hand. Later, during the ceremony, Vilas whispered something in Kuerten's ear that caused him to laugh during the speech of the chairman of the event. Kuerten later refused to reveal what it was that Vilas had said, claiming it would be inelegant to do so, but journalists that were equipped with powerful lenses were able to read Vilas's lips, and it was revealed that he had said in Spanish something like: "Get ready kid, it's going to rain women on your lap!".

=== 1999: Top 5 debut ===
He established himself as the leading clay court player of his generation in 1999, and he became one of three South Americans to complete the year in the top 10 in all the history of the ATP rankings. In April he won the Monte-Carlo Masters beating the Chilean Marcelo Ríos. In May he won the Rome Masters, beating Patrick Rafter in the final. In June he reached the quarterfinals at the French Open, losing to unseeded eventual runner-up Andriy Medvedev. At Wimbledon, he became the first Brazilian to reach the quarterfinals since Thomaz Koch in 1968. He was defeated by Andre Agassi in the quarterfinals, but had lost just one set until that stage. In July, he defeated Sébastien Grosjean 9–7 in the fifth set of the 1999 Davis Cup quarterfinal between Brazil and France. That match lasted 4 hours and 43 minutes. He also became the first Brazilian to qualify for the ATP Tennis Masters Cup, today known as the Nitto ATP Finals, winning a match but failing to get past round robin.

=== 2000: World No. 1 ===
After another solid clay court swing, Kuerten won his second French Open title by defeating Magnus Norman (who had beaten him a few weeks earlier in the final of the Rome Masters) on his 11th match point. Kuerten became the first South American to finish the year as World No. 1 in the history of the ATP rankings (since 1973). It was a close contest with young up-and-comer Marat Safin at the year's last event, the Tennis Masters Cup (in its first year under that name) in Lisbon, Portugal, with one loss meaning that Safin would have been No. 1. Despite Safin having 4 chances to finish the year as world No. 1, Kuerten defied all odds and finished the year at No. 1 by beating Pete Sampras and Andre Agassi in back-to-back matches on an indoor hard court. He broke an eight-year hold of players from the U.S. on the year-end No. 1 position. He also became the first South American to finish in Top 5 in consecutive years since Guillermo Vilas of Argentina in 1977–78.

=== 2001: Continued dominance, start of injuries ===
In 2001, he won his third French Open crown, joining former greats Björn Borg (6), Ivan Lendl (3) and Mats Wilander (3) with three or more French Open titles in the Open Era; former champion Jim Courier presented him with the trophy. His road to the title saw him save a match point against fourth round opponent Michael Russell. In the final he beat Àlex Corretja in four sets and drew a big heart on the red clay. He also won the biggest hardcourt title of his career in August at the Cincinnati Masters, where he defeated Patrick Rafter in the final. At the US Open he was seeded first but lost in the quarterfinals in straight sets to seventh-seeded Yevgeni Kafelnikov.

Injuries started to plague Kuerten as he lost 8 of the next 9 matches to conclude the year. Despite being the favorite to finish as world No. 1 for the second consecutive year, his poor season ending showing saw Lleyton Hewitt overtake him. He led the ATP in prize money for the second straight year, with US$4,091,004.

=== 2004 ===
At the Australian Open Kuerten reached the third round for the first, and only, time in his career by defeating Ivan Ljubičić in the second round in four sets but subsequently lost to Paradorn Schrichapan. In an injury-ridden year, Kuerten won one ATP Tour title, which he did at home, by winning the Brasil Open for the second time. In that year, the tournament had been moved from September to February, and the surface had been changed from hard to clay, as a result of a compromise with the Buenos Aires Open, in Argentina, and the Viña del Mar Open, in Chile, to tighten up a clear South American tournament circuit. With his victory, Kuerten became the only player to win the title on both surfaces, having previously won it in 2002.

Kuerten was responsible for the only defeat of Roger Federer in a Grand Slam event in 2004. In Kuerten's only previous encounter against Federer on clay, in the Hamburg Masters 2002, Federer defeated Kuerten 6–0, 1–6, 6–2. When they met again in the third round at the French Open in 2004, it was Federer who was in dominant form, the world no. 1, and expected to win against the injury-ridden Kuerten. Instead, it was Kuerten who overpowered and dominated Federer, beating him in straight sets. This would remain the last time that Federer was defeated in any Grand Slam prior to the quarterfinals stage until his round 2 loss against Serhiy Stakhovsky at Wimbledon in 2013.

On 1 September Kuerten announced that he would be withdrawing from the ATP Tour for an indefinite period of time, in order to undergo detailed exams of his operated hip, which had reportedly started to bother him again. He did not play again for the rest of the year.

=== 2006 ===
In the first months of 2006, injuries and weak performances kept Kuerten from reclaiming his status as a top world player. Ranked out of the top 200, Kuerten was no longer the top player in Brazil (currently behind Ricardo Mello and Flávio Saretta) and was expected to need wildcards to play any of the main tournaments of the season. His main attempt to come back, at the 2006 Brasil Open, was cut short in the first round. Following this debacle, Kuerten managed to obtain wildcards to play in the two North American Masters Series events, Miami and Indian Wells, but injuries forced Kuerten to withdraw from both. The French Tennis Federation had announced that Kuerten, as a three-time champion, would have every chance of being granted a wildcard to play at the 2006 French Open, provided that he managed to remain active throughout the 2006 season leading up to the French Open. Because Kuerten had been inactive in the Men's Tour since mid-February, he was not granted the wildcard to play, thus missing the French Open for the first time in his professional career.

=== 2007 ===
Kuerten's form did not improve in 2007. Because his ranking was not high enough to qualify for ATP Tour tournaments, Kuerten relied on wild cards to enter those events. Kuerten finished with a 2–7 win–loss record for the year. In November, Gustavo Kuerten's younger brother, Guilherme, who had cerebral palsy, died.

=== 2008 ===
Kuerten made an announcement that he expected 2008 to be his final year of play. Kuerten chose to devise his schedule around tournaments that had sentimental value to him, such as the French Open, the Brasil Open, and the Miami Masters. After two first-round defeats in singles (Costa do Sauípe, l. to Berlocq and Miami, l. to Grosjean), Kuerten won his first ATP Masters Series level match in a long time, partnering Nicolás Lapentti, in Miami, against Feliciano López and Fernando Verdasco.

==== Retirement ====
On 25 May 2008, Gustavo Kuerten played his last professional singles match in front of 15,000 spectators at Roland Garros. He arrived on court wearing his 'lucky' uniform, the same blue & yellow one that he wore in 1997 when he won his first French Open tournament. Despite saving a match point against his opponent Paul-Henri Mathieu, he finally lost in three sets (6–3, 6–4, 6–2)—his result in the final of French Open in 1997. He was honored after the game by the tournament organizers and by all the fans present for what he has achieved throughout his career.

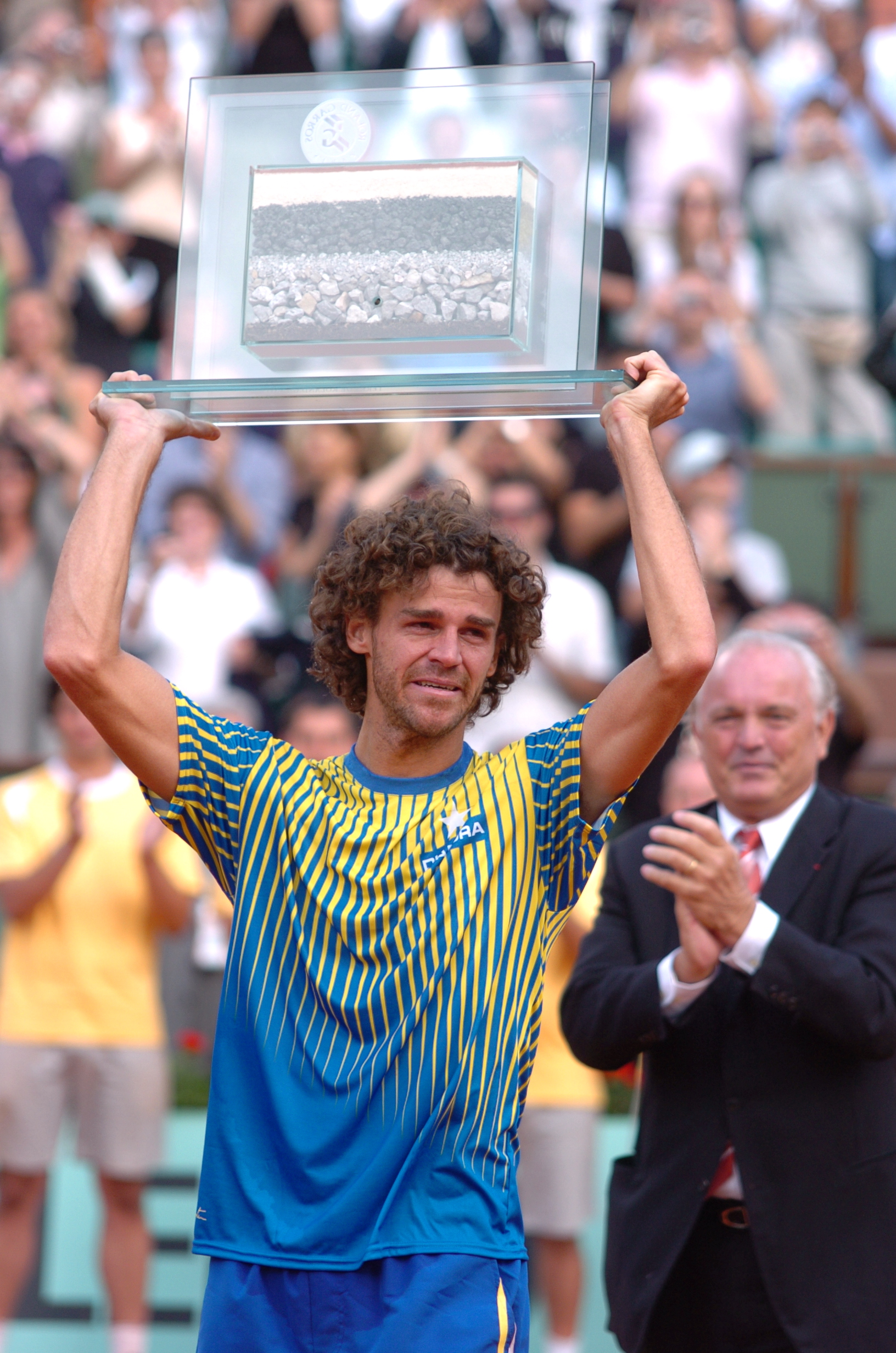
Kuerten received a symbolic trophy following the final match of his career, on May 25, 2008, at the French Open.

== Playing style ==
Kuerten embraced the baseline style of play, with heavy topspin on his ground strokes and a solid serve that enabled him to wear down his opponents from the back of the court. Kuerten, however, emphasized offensive baseline play as opposed to the traditional defensive baseline play favoured by classic clay court specialists, and unlike them, his first serve was his biggest weapon. He played right-handed with a single-handed backhand using a western grip. The arcing backhand played with topspin was his trademark shot. He was one of the earliest adopters to play with polyester strings which allowed him to swing for pace and at the same time create the topspin needed to control the ball.

== Davis Cup ==
Kuerten's Davis Cup record
	Surface				Indoor	Outdoor	Total
	Clay	Carpet	Grass	Hard	Indoor	Outdoor	Total
Won	28	6	–	–	8	26	34
Lost	8	5	2	–	5	10	15

Kuerten was first called to play for Brazil in the Davis Cup in 1996, when he became the second-best ranked player in the country (to Fernando Meligeni). Since then, Kuerten has always answered the invitations to play, claiming that it was a unique opportunity to represent his country.

In the 1999 and 2000 seasons, Kuerten took criticism from his fans, who accused him of not giving 100% in the Davis Cup matches. They claimed he was more concerned with sparing his energy for the ATP tournaments. At one point, Kuerten interrupted a match to argue with a fan who had shouted out for him to apply himself to the match at hand.

In 2004, following the country's unexpected defeat to Canada in the Repechage match, and the country's demotion to the American Group I after having been defeated by Sweden in that year's First Round, discontent with the politics of the Brazilian Tennis Confederation spilled over. Kuerten refused to play for Brazil in the American Group I. The unexpected firing of then captain of the Brazilian team, Ricardo Accioly, was the trigger. Kuerten thought it was an arbitrary decision, since it was made without consulting the players. In his view that was just the last in a sequence of questionable decisions made by organization's board.

All other professional Brazilian players followed Kuerten's lead, as well as the newly appointed captain, former player Jaime Oncins. As a result, Brazil had to play the first round in the Zonal Group with a team made up of junior players (which was only possible after much negotiation, during which time the country was at risk of forfeiting the Round, which would have resulted in automatic demoting to the American Group II), which resulted in a defeat and the possibility of demotion to the American Group II.

The protest continued, and as a result, Brazil had to play the Repechage match again with a junior team, and was demoted to the American Group II for the 2005 season. As of 2005, following the fall of the BTC board in the aftermath of the protest, Kuerten and the other players have decided to return to the team, now captained by former player Fernando Meligeni. Kuerten, however, had to delay his return beyond the end of the players' strike, since his hip injuries kept him off courts between September 2004 and May 2005. He returned in the Tie with the Netherlands Antilles, valid for the Second Round of the American Zonal Group II, which was played in Santa Catarina, Brazil (on clay) between July 15 and July 17, 2005.

== Equipment and sponsors ==
During his career, Kuerten used Head racquets with Luxilon polyester strings. He wore Diadora clothes, changing them on a short period for Olympikus and Head. In 2012, after his retirement, he signed a sponsor deal with French brands Lacoste (for clothes) and Peugeot (for TV commercials). Kuerten also has his own clothes and glasses brand, named "Guga Kuerten".

== Personal life ==
Kuerten was born in Florianópolis in southern Brazil and is of German heritage. He began playing tennis when he was six, an early start to a life and career marked by family tragedy. His father, Aldo, a former amateur tennis player, died of a heart attack in 1985 while umpiring a junior tennis match in Curitiba, when Kuerten was eight years old. His older brother, Raphael, is currently his business manager. His youngest brother, Guilherme, suffered prolonged oxygen deprivation and consequently irreparable brain damage during birth, and as a result suffered from cerebral palsy until his death in 2007. Kuerten was deeply affected by his brother's daily struggles, later donating the entire prize money from one tournament he has won every year of his professional career so far to a hometown NGO that provides assistance for people suffering from similar disabilities. He gave every trophy he won to his younger brother as a souvenir, including the three miniature replicas of the French Open men's singles trophy.

As a young player, Kuerten first learned from Carlos Alves. Alves would continue to coach Kuerten for the next 8 years. When he was 14 years old, Kuerten met Larri Passos who would be his coach for the following 15 years. Passos convinced Kuerten and his family that the youth was talented enough to make a living out of playing tennis. The two started traveling all over the world to participate in junior tournaments. Kuerten turned professional in 1995.

In 2000, he founded the Gustavo Kuerten Institute, a non-profit philanthropic association based in Florianópolis in support of children and disabled people.

Since retirement he has settled down in his place of birth, the Brazilian island of Florianópolis, where he is an active member in the lakeside district of Lagoa da Conceição. He still enjoys teaching and playing tennis with the local enthusiasts. In his hometown, he is known as the "Cachorro Grande" ("Big Dog"). He is an avid surfer.

Kuerten was accepted to a drama course at CEART, the Center of Arts of Santa Catarina State University (UDESC) in Florianópolis. He began his studies there on 16 February 2009.

In November 2010, on his brother Guilherme's birthday, he married Mariana Soncini and the couple have a daughter and a son.

In October 2016 he was in court for tax evasion, related to income earned from copyright and image rights between 1995 and 2002, and in November was ordered to pay 7 million R$ (appr. US$2 million).

His favourite football team is Brazilian Avaí Futebol Clube. He is a distant cousin to model and TV presenter, Renata Kuerten.

Kuerten and his brother Guilherme had the custom of watching the Johnny Bravo cartoon during training breaks.

== Awards and honors ==
In 1998, 2002 and 2004 Kuerten received the Prix Orange Roland Garros Award for sportsmanship from the association of tennis journalists. In his homeland Brazil he was awarded the Prêmio Brasil Olímpico in 1999 and was named Athlete of the Year in 1999 and 2000. He received the ATP Arthur Ashe Humanitarian of the Year Award in 2003. Kuerten was inducted into the International Tennis Hall of Fame in 2012. In June 2016 he became their global ambassador, representing the organisation, especially in South America. In 2005, Tennis Magazine put him in 37th place in its list of "The 40 Greatest Players of the Tennis Era".

In 2010, Kuerten was presented with the ITF's highest accolade, the Philippe Chatrier Award, for his contributions to tennis. That same year he won the Mercosur Konex Award from Argentina as the best tennis player of South America in that decade.

Kuerten won the International Club's prestigious Jean Borotra Sportsmanship Award in 2011.

On 16 February 2016, the central court of Rio Open was named after him, officially Guga Kuerten court.

On 5 August 2016, he relayed the Olympic Torch into Maracanã Stadium during the Opening Ceremonies for 2016 Summer Olympics in Rio de Janeiro, relaying off to Hortencia Marcari.

== Career statistics ==
Key
W	F	SF	QF	#R	RR	Q#	DNQ	A	NH

(W) winner; (F) finalist; (SF) semifinalist; (QF) quarterfinalist; (#R) rounds 4, 3, 2, 1; (RR) round-robin stage; (Q#) qualification round; (DNQ) did not qualify; (A) absent; (NH) not held; (SR) strike rate (events won / competed); (W–L) win–loss record.

=== Grand Slam performance timeline ===
Tournament	1995	1996	1997	1998	1999	2000	2001	2002	2003	2004	2005	2006	2007	2008	SR	W–L
Australian Open	A	A	2R	2R	2R	1R	2R	1R	2R	3R	A	A	A	A	0 / 8	7–8
French Open	A	1R	W	2R	QF	W	W	4R	4R	QF	1R	A	A	1R	3 / 11	36–8
Wimbledon	A	A	1R	1R	QF	3R	A	A	2R	A	A	A	A	A	0 / 5	7–5
US Open	A	A	3R	2R	QF	1R	QF	4R	1R	1R	2R	A	A	A	0 / 9	15–9
Win–loss	0–0	0–1	10–3	3–4	13–4	9–3	12–2	6–3	5–4	6–3	1–2	0–0	0–0	0–1	3 / 33	65–30

==== Finals: 3 (3 titles) ====
Result	Year	Championship	Surface	Opponent	Score
Win	1997	French Open	Clay	(Spain) Sergi Bruguera	6–3, 6–4, 6–2
Win	2000	French Open	Clay	(Sweden) Magnus Norman	6–2, 6–3, 2–6, 7–6^{(8–6)}
Win	2001	French Open	Clay	(Spain) Àlex Corretja	6–7^{(3–7)}, 7–5, 6–2, 6–0

=== Year-end championships performance timeline ===
Tournament	1995	1996	1997	1998	1999	2000	2001	2002	2003	2004	2005	2006	2007	2008	SR	W–L
Tennis Masters Cup	Did not qualify				RR	W	RR	Did not qualify							1 / 3	5–6

==== Finals: 1 (1 title) ====
Result	Year	Championship	Surface	Opponent	Score
Win	2000	Tennis Masters Cup, Portugal	Hard (i)	(United States) Andre Agassi	6–4, 6–4, 6–4

Awards
Preceded by Inaugural	Brazilian Sportsmen of the Year; 1999, 2000	Succeeded by Robert Scheidt

Sporting positions
Preceded by Marat Safin; Marat Safin; Marat Safin	World No. 1 December 4, 2000 – January 28, 2001 (8 weeks); February 26, 2001 – April 1, 2001 (5 weeks); April 23, 2001 – November 18, 2001 (30 weeks)	Succeeded by Marat Safin; Marat Safin; Lleyton Hewitt
Awards and achievements
Preceded by None	Prêmio Brasil Olímpico; 1999, 2000	Succeeded by Robert Scheidt
Preceded by Andre Agassi	ITF World Champion; 2000	Succeeded by Lleyton Hewitt
Preceded by Andre Agassi	ATP Player of the Year; 2000	Succeeded by Lleyton Hewitt
Preceded by Aisam-ul-Haq Qureshi & Amir Hadad	ATP Arthur Ashe Humanitarian of the Year; 2003	Succeeded by Andy Roddick
