= 1999 Salem Open – Singles =

Singles
- 1999 Salem Open

Final
- Champion: (United States) Andre Agassi
- Runner-up: (Germany) Boris Becker
- Score: 6–7^{(4–7)}, 6–4, 6–4

Details
- Draw: 32
- Seeds: 8

Events
Singles	men	women
Doubles	men	women
← 1998 ·	Salem Open

The 1999 Salem Open was a men's tennis tournament played on Hard courts in Hong Kong that was part of the International Series of the 1999 ATP Tour. It was the twenty-fourth edition of the tournament and was held from 5 April – 12 April.

== Seeds ==
Champion seeds are indicated in bold text while text in italics indicates the round in which those seeds were eliminated.

1. (Netherlands) Richard Krajicek (quarterfinals)
2. (Australia) Patrick Rafter (first round)
3. (United States) **Andre Agassi (champions)**
4. (France) Cédric Pioline (first round)
5. (Germany) Nicolas Kiefer (quarterfinals)
6. (South Africa) Wayne Ferreira (second round)
7. (Sweden) Jonas Björkman (quarterfinals)
8. (United States) Michael Chang (second round)

== Draw ==
Key

- Q = Qualifier
- WC = Wild card
- LL = Lucky loser
- Alt = Alternate
- ITF = ITF entry
- PR = Protected ranking
- SR = Special ranking
- SE = Special exempt
- JE = Junior exempt
- JR = Junior Accelerator Programme entrant
- CO = College Accelerator Programme entrant
- NG = Next Gen Accelerator Program entrant
- w/o = Walkover
- r = Retired
- d = Defaulted

=== Finals ===
Semifinals
(Germany) Hendrik Dreekmann	3	0
3	**(United States) Andre Agassi**	**6**	**6**
**(Germany) Boris Becker**	**6**	**6**
(Germany) Bernd Karbacher	4	4

Final
3	**(United States) Andre Agassi**	6^{4}	**6**	**6**
(Germany) Boris Becker	**7**	4	4

=== Top half ===
First round
1	**(Netherlands) R Krajicek**	**6**	**6**
(Japan) T Suzuki	4	4
**(Denmark) K Carlsen**	**6**	**6**
(Argentina) M Rodríguez	1	4
**(Germany) H Dreekmann**	**6**	**6**
(United States) J Tarango	4	4
8	**(United States) M Chang**	**6**	**6**
(Czech Republic) D Vacek	1	4
3	**(United States) A Agassi**	**6**	**6**
(Italy) G Pozzi	2	2
**(Germany) O Gross**	**6**	**6**
(Hong Kong) W Wong	3	0
**(Thailand) P Srichaphan**	**6**	**7**
(Czech Republic) P Luxa	1	6^{11}
5	**(Germany) N Kiefer**	**6**	**6**
(Slovakia) J Krošlák	1	0

Second round
1	**(Netherlands) R Krajicek**	**7**	**7**
(Denmark) K Carlsen	6^{8}	6^{2}
**(Germany) H Dreekmann**	3	**7**	**6**
8	(United States) M Chang	**6**	5	4
3	**(United States) A Agassi**	**6**	**6**
(Germany) O Gross	2	3
(Thailand) P Srichaphan	1	4
5	**(Germany) N Kiefer**	**6**	**6**

Quarterfinals
1	(Netherlands) R Krajicek	3	**6**	3
**(Germany) H Dreekmann**	**6**	3	**6**
3	**(United States) A Agassi**	**6**	**6**
5	(Germany) N Kiefer	2	2

Semifinals
(Germany) H Dreekmann	3	0
3	**(United States) A Agassi**	**6**	**6**

=== Bottom half ===
First round
6	**(South Africa) W Ferreira**	4	**6**	**6**
(Canada) D Nestor	**6**	4	3
**(Germany) B Becker**	**6**	**6**
(United States) M Sell	3	1
**(United States) C Mamiit**	**7**	**6**
(Canada) S Lareau	5	3
**(Italy) L Tieleman**	2	**6**	**6**
4	(France) C Pioline	**6**	1	4
7	**(Sweden) J Björkman**	**6**	**6**
(Czech Republic) R Štěpánek	3	3
**(Japan) G Motomura**	**7**	4	**6**
(Germany) D Prinosil	5	**6**	3
**(New Zealand) B Steven**	**6**	**6**
(United States) S Campbell	4	1
**(Germany) B Karbacher**	6^{5}	**7**	**6**
2	(Australia) P Rafter	**7**	6^{1}	2

Second round
6	(South Africa) W Ferreira	4	6^{10}
**(Germany) B Becker**	**6**	**7**
(United States) C Mamiit	3	4
**(Italy) L Tieleman**	**6**	**6**
7	**(Sweden) J Björkman**	**6**	**6**
(Japan) G Motomura	2	4
(New Zealand) B Steven	4	0
**(Germany) B Karbacher**	**6**	**6**

Quarterfinals
**(Germany) B Becker**	**7**	**7**
(Italy) L Tieleman	6^{3}	6^{3}
7	(Sweden) J Björkman	4	4
**(Germany) B Karbacher**	**6**	**6**

Semifinals
**(Germany) B Becker**	**6**	**6**
(Germany) B Karbacher	4	4
