= Àlex Corretja =

Spanish tennis player (born 1974)

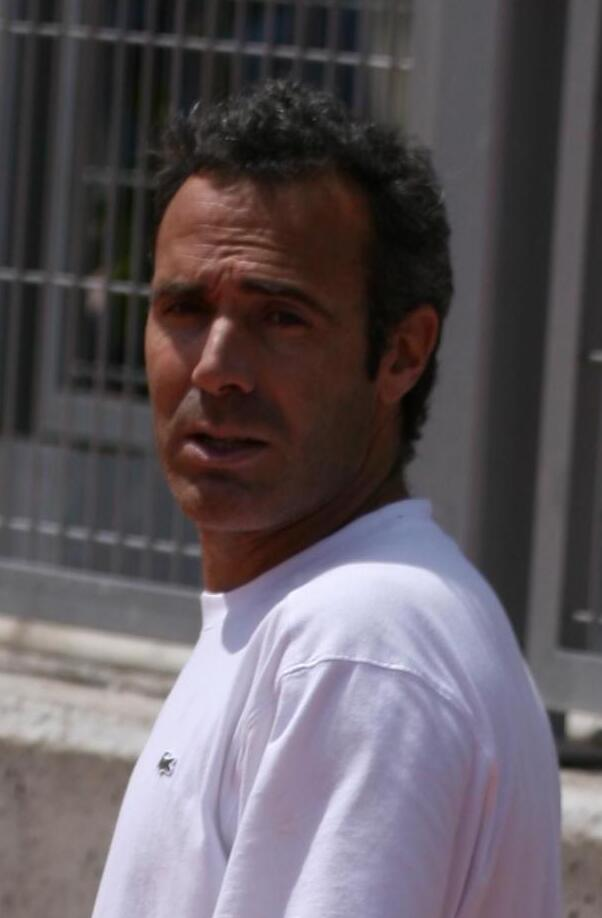
- Corretja in 2009
- Country (sports): Spain
- Born: 11 April 1974 (age 52) Barcelona, Spain
- Height: 1.80 m (5 ft 11 in)
- Turned pro: 1991
- Retired: 2005
- Plays: Right-handed (one-handed backhand)
- Prize money: $10,411,354

Singles
- Career record: 438–281 (60.9%)
- Career titles: 17
- Highest ranking: No. 2 (1 February 1999)

Grand Slam singles results
- Australian Open: 3R (1998)
- French Open: F (1998, 2001)
- Wimbledon: 2R (1994, 1996)
- US Open: QF (1996)

Other tournaments
- Tour Finals: W (1998)
- Grand Slam Cup: 1R (1996)
- Olympic Games: 3R (2000)

Doubles
- Career record: 103–115 (47.2%)
- Career titles: 3
- Highest ranking: No. 50 (9 June 1997)

Grand Slam doubles results
- Australian Open: 3R (1998)
- Wimbledon: 3R (1996)
- US Open: 3R (1996)

Team competitions
- Davis Cup: W (2000)
Medal record
Olympic Games – Tennis
Bronze medal – third place	2000 Sydney	Doubles

Àlex Corretja Verdegay (Catalan pronunciation: [ˈaləks kuˈrɛdʒə βəɾðəˈɣaj]; born 11 April 1974) is a Spanish former professional tennis player. He was ranked world No. 2 in men's singles by the Association of Tennis Professionals (ATP) in 1999. Corretja won 17 ATP Tour singles titles, including the 1998 ATP World Tour Championships, and Masters titles at the 1997 Italian Open and 2000 Indian Wells Masters. He was twice a major runner-up at the French Open, in 1998 and 2001. Corretja played a key role in helping Spain win its first Davis Cup title in 2000. Corretja is one of only two players who are undefeated against Rafael Nadal after playing more than one match against him (the other being Dustin Brown), holding a 2–0 head-to-head record.

Post-retirement, Corretja became Andy Murray's temporary coach for the duration of the 2008 clay-court season, resuming the role on a permanent basis between 2009 and 2011. In 2012 and 2013, he coached the Spanish Davis Cup team.

== Career ==
Corretja was born in Barcelona, and first came to the tennis world's attention as a promising junior player who won the Orange Bowl under-16 title in 1990. He turned professional in 1991 and won his first top-level singles title in 1994 at Buenos Aires. His first doubles title came in 1995 at Palermo.

=== 1996 ===
In 1996, Corretja faced Pete Sampras in an epic five-set quarterfinal match at the US Open. Pete Sampras vomited in the fifth-set tiebreak, where Corretja held a match point later on, but he eventually lost to Sampras on a double fault in 4 hours and 9 minutes.

=== 1997 ===
In 1997, Corretja captured three titles, including his first Tennis Masters Series title in Rome, where he defeated Marcelo Ríos. (He won a second Masters Series title in 2000 at Indian Wells.)

=== 1998 ===
1998 saw Corretja reach his first Grand Slam final at the French Open. In the third round, he defeated Argentina's Hernán Gumy in (at the time) the longest match in the tournament's history. Corretja won the 5-hour 31-minute marathon. In the final, Corretja lost to fellow-Spaniard Carlos Moyà in straight sets.

Corretja finished 1998 by winning the most significant title of his career, the ATP Tour World Championships. In the group stage, he beat world no. 5 Andre Agassi, and in the semifinals, Corretja saved three match points on the way to beating world no. 1 Sampras. In the final, Corretja faced world no. 4 Moyà in a five-set marathon and came back from two sets down to win in 4 hours and 1 minute. Corretja's win made him the first man to ever win the Tour Championships (in its 29-year history) without having ever won a Grand Slam tournament. (David Nalbandian, Nikolay Davydenko, Grigor Dimitrov, Alexander Zverev and Stefanos Tsitsipas have since repeated the feat.)

In total, Corretja won a career-high five singles titles during the 1998 season, on three different surfaces (Clay, Hard and Carpet). He finished the year ranked world No. 3.

=== 1999 ===
Corretja reached three tournament finals, the quarterfinals of the French Open and reached his career high ranking of 2 in February.

=== 2000 ===
In 2000, Corretja won the Indian Wells Masters title, beating Thomas Enqvist in straight sets in the final. He also beat world no. 1 Agassi in the final of the Washington Open for the loss of just five games.

In the Davis Cup, Corretja helped Spain to their first ever title win. He went 3–0 in singles rubbers during the earlier rounds, and then teamed up with Joan Manuel Balcells to win the doubles match in the final as Spain beat Australia 3–1. Corretja also won a men's doubles bronze medal at the Olympic Games in Sydney, partnering Albert Costa.

=== 2001 ===
In 2001, Corretja reached the men's singles final at the French Open for the second time, losing in the final to defending champion Gustavo Kuerten in four sets. In July of that year, Corretja won a five-set marathon match in the final of the Dutch Open against Younes El Aynaoui. The 53-game match was the year's longest tour final.

=== 2002 ===
Corretja's biggest win of 2002 came in the quarterfinals of the Davis Cup, where he rallied from two sets down to beat Sampras on grass. (Spain eventually lost the tie 3–1.) At the French Open, Corretja saved four match points in the third round against Arnaud Clément, before going on to win. Corretja then progressed to the semifinals, where he lost in four sets to Albert Costa (who went on to win the title). One week later, Corretja was the best man at Costa's wedding.

=== 2003-05 ===
In 2003, Corretja was again part of a Spanish team which reached the Davis Cup final. He won two doubles and one singles rubber in the earlier rounds. However, in the final, Corretja and Feliciano López lost the doubles rubber, as Spain were beaten 3–1 by Australia.

Corretja announced his retirement on 24 September 2005. He won a total of 17 top-level singles titles and three doubles titles during his career.

== After retirement ==
Corretja coached Britain's Andy Murray from 2008 to 2011.

As of 2015, he works for Eurosport as a field interviewer at the Grand Slam tournaments.

== Career statistics ==
=== Performance timeline ===
Key
W	F	SF	QF	#R	RR	Q#	DNQ	A	NH

(W) winner; (F) finalist; (SF) semifinalist; (QF) quarterfinalist; (#R) rounds 4, 3, 2, 1; (RR) round-robin stage; (Q#) qualification round; (DNQ) did not qualify; (A) absent; (NH) not held; (SR) strike rate (events won / competed); (W–L) win–loss record.

Tournament	1992	1993	1994	1995	1996	1997	1998	1999	2000	2001	2002	2003	2004	2005	SR	W–L
Grand Slam tournaments
Australian Open	A	A	A	A	2R	2R	3R	2R	2R	A	1R	1R	2R	A	0 / 8	8–8
French Open	1R	1R	3R	4R	2R	4R	F	QF	QF	F	SF	1R	3R	A	0 / 13	36–13
Wimbledon	A	A	2R	A	2R	A	1R	A	A	A	A	A	1R	A	0 / 4	2–4
US Open	1R	1R	1R	2R	QF	3R	4R	1R	3R	3R	3R	1R	1R	A	0 / 13	16–13
Win–loss	0–2	0–2	3–3	4–2	7–4	6–2	11–4	5–3	7–3	8–2	7–3	0–3	3–4	0–0	0 / 38	61–38
Year-end championships
Tennis Masters Cup	Did not qualify						W	DNQ	RR	Did not qualify					1 / 2	5–3

=== Grand Slam finals ===
==== Singles: 2 (2 runner-ups) ====
Result	Year	Championship	Surface	Opponent	Score
Loss	1998	French Open	Clay	(Spain) Carlos Moyá	3–6, 5–7, 3–6
Loss	2001	French Open	Clay	(Brazil) Gustavo Kuerten	7–6^{(7–3)}, 5–7, 2–6, 0–6

=== Year-end championships finals ===
==== Singles: 1 (1 title) ====
Result	Year	Championship	Surface	Opponent	Score
Win	1998	ATP Tour World Championships, Hanover	Hard (i)	(Spain) Carlos Moyà	3–6, 3–6, 7–5, 6–3, 7–5

=== Olympics medal matches ===
==== Doubles: 1 (1 bronze medal) ====
Result	Year	Tournament	Surface	Partner	Opponents	Score
Bronze	2000	Summer Olympics	Hard	(Spain) Albert Costa	(South Africa) David Adams (South Africa) John-Laffnie de Jager	2–6, 6–4, 6–3

=== Masters Series finals ===
==== Singles: 5 (2 titles, 3 runner-ups) ====
Result	Year	Tournament	Surface	Opponent	Score
Loss	1996	Hamburg Masters	Clay	(Spain) Roberto Carretero	6–2, 4–6, 4–6, 4–6
Loss	1997	Monte-Carlo Masters	Clay	(Chile) Marcelo Ríos	4–6, 3–6, 3–6
Win	1997	Rome Masters	Clay	(Chile) Marcelo Ríos	7–5, 7–5, 6–3
Loss	1998	Hamburg Masters	Clay	(Spain) Albert Costa	2–6, 0–6, 0–1 ret.
Win	2000	Indian Wells Masters	Hard	(Sweden) Thomas Enqvist	6–4, 6–4, 6–3
