= 2000 Mercedes-Benz Cup =

- Date: July 24–30
- Edition: 73rd
- Category: International Series
- Draw: 32S / 16D
- Prize money: $350,000
- Surface: Hard / outdoor
- Location: Los Angeles, United States
- Venue: Los Angeles Tennis Center

Champions

Singles
- (United States) Michael Chang

Doubles
- (Australia) Paul Kilderry / (Australia) Sandon Stolle
← 1999 ·	Los Angeles Open	· 2001 →

The 2000 Mercedes-Benz Cup was a men's tennis tournament played on outdoor hard courts at the Los Angeles Tennis Center in Los Angeles, California in the United States and was part of the International Series of the 2000 ATP Tour. The tournament ran from July 24 through July 30, 2000. Fourth-seeded Michael Chang won the singles title.

== Finals ==
=== Singles ===
(United States) Michael Chang defeated (United States) Jan-Michael Gambill 6–7^{(2–7)}, 6–3 retired

- It was Chang's only singles title of the year and the 34th, and last, of his career.

=== Doubles ===
(Australia) Paul Kilderry / (Australia) Sandon Stolle defeated (United States) Jan-Michael Gambill / (United States) Scott Humphries walkover
