= 2000 Mercedes-Benz Cup – Singles =

Singles
- 2000 Mercedes-Benz Cup

Final
- Champion: (United States) Michael Chang
- Runner-up: (United States) Jan-Michael Gambill
- Score: 6–7^{(2–7)}, 6–3 retired

Details
- Draw: 32 (4 Q / 3 WC )
- Seeds: 8

Events
Singles	Doubles
← 1999 ·	Los Angeles Open	· 2001 →

Pete Sampras was the defending champion, but did not participate.

Michael Chang won the title after Jan-Michael Gambill retired at the end of the second set of the final due to knee and ankle sprains.

== Seeds ==
1. (United States) Andre Agassi (withdrew due to back injury)
2. (Australia) Mark Philippoussis (second round)
3. (Chile) Marcelo Ríos (first round, defaulted)
4. (United States) Michael Chang (champion)
5. (South Africa) Wayne Ferreira (quarterfinals)
6. (United States) Jan-Michael Gambill (final, retired)
7. (Australia) Andrew Ilie (first round)
8. (France) Arnaud Clément (semifinals)

== Draw ==
=== Key ===
- Q = Qualifier
- WC = Wild card
- LL = Lucky loser
- Alt = Alternate
- ITF = ITF entry
- PR = Protected ranking
- SR = Special ranking
- SE = Special exempt
- JE = Junior exempt
- JR = Junior Accelerator Programme entrant
- CO = College Accelerator Programme entrant
- NG = Next Gen Accelerator Program entrant
- w/o = Walkover
- r = Retired
- d = Defaulted

=== Finals ===
Semifinals
8	(France) Arnaud Clément	6	0	3
6	(United States) Jan-Michael Gambill	3	6	6
4	(United States) Michael Chang	3	6	6
(United States) Justin Gimelstob	6	3	0

Final
6	(United States) Jan-Michael Gambill	7^{7}	3	0^{r}
4	(United States) Michael Chang	6^{2}	6	0

=== Top half ===
First round
LL	(France) L Roux	6	1	6
WC	(United States) T Dent	4	6	3
(Slovakia) J Krošlák	6	6
(France) C Saulnier	2	2
Q	(Australia) S Draper	4	7^{8}	6^{5}
Q	(South Africa) N Godwin	6	6^{6}	7^{7}
(South Africa) M Ondruska	3	2
8	(France) A Clément	6	6
3	(Chile) M Ríos	3^{d}
Q	(Japan) G Motomura	5
(Australia) J Stoltenberg	6	3	6
WC	(United States) B Bryan	3	6	4
(Israel) H Levy	4	0
(Italy) L Tieleman	6	6
(Philippines) C Mamiit	3	2
6	(United States) J-M Gambill	6	6

Second round
LL	(France) L Roux	6	7^{7}
(Slovakia) J Krošlák	3	6^{2}
Q	(South Africa) N Godwin	4	6	3
8	(France) A Clément	6	4	6
Q	(Japan) G Motomura	1	2
(Australia) J Stoltenberg	6	6
(Italy) L Tieleman	6^{2}	2
6	(United States) J-M Gambill	7^{7}	6

Quarterfinals
LL	(France) L Roux	3	2
8	(France) A Clément	6	6
(Australia) J Stoltenberg	1	6	1
6	(United States) J-M Gambill	6	3	6

Semifinals
8	(France) A Clément	6	0	3
6	(United States) J-M Gambill	3	6	6

=== Bottom half ===
First round
5	(South Africa) W Ferreira	6	6
(France) A Dupuis	2	2
(Thailand) P Srichaphan	6	6
(Canada) S Lareau	4	4
(Zimbabwe) K Ullyett	6^{4}	6	6
(Haiti) R Agénor	7^{7}	2	4
Q	(Australia) P Kilderry	4	2
4	(United States) M Chang	6	6
7	(Australia) A Ilie	3	2
LL	(United States) A O'Brien	6	6
(Switzerland) L Manta	6	1	4
(United States) P Goldstein	3	6	6
(United States) J Gimelstob	6	6
(Australia) J Sekulov	3	3
LL	(United States) S Humphries	5	6^{2}
2/WC	(Australia) M Philippoussis	7	7^{7}

Second round
5	(South Africa) W Ferreira	7^{7}	4	7
(Thailand) P Srichaphan	6^{1}	6	5
(Zimbabwe) K Ullyett	1	3
4	(United States) M Chang	6	6
LL	(United States) A O'Brien	4	2
(United States) P Goldstein	6	6
(United States) J Gimelstob	3	7^{7}	7^{7}
2/WC	(Australia) M Philippoussis	6	6^{5}	6^{3}

Quarterfinals
5	(South Africa) W Ferreira	3	6^{7}
4	(United States) M Chang	6	7^{9}
(United States) P Goldstein	0^{r}
(United States) J Gimelstob	3

Semifinals
4	(United States) M Chang	3	6	6
(United States) J Gimelstob	6	3	0
