= 2001 Mercedes-Benz Cup – Doubles =

Doubles
- 2001 Mercedes-Benz Cup

Final
- Champions: (United States) Bob Bryan (United States) Mike Bryan
- Runners-up: (United States) Jan-Michael Gambill (United States) Andy Roddick
- Score: 7–5, 7–6^{(8–6)}

Details
- Draw: 16
- Seeds: 4

Events
Singles	Doubles
← 2000 ·	Los Angeles Open	· 2002 →

Paul Kilderry and Sandon Stolle were the defending champions but lost in the quarterfinals to Tommy Haas and Max Mirnyi.

Bob Bryan and Mike Bryan won in the final 7–5, 7–6^{(8–6)} against Jan-Michael Gambill and Andy Roddick.

== Seeds ==
1. (United States) Bob Bryan / (United States) Mike Bryan (champions)
2. (Zimbabwe) Wayne Black / (Zimbabwe) Kevin Ullyett (first round)
3. (United States) Justin Gimelstob / (United States) Alex O'Brien (semifinals)
4. (Australia) Paul Kilderry / (Australia) Sandon Stolle (quarterfinals)

== Draw ==
=== Key ===
- Q = Qualifier
- WC = Wild card
- LL = Lucky loser
- Alt = Alternate
- SE = Special exempt
- PR = Protected ranking
- ITF = ITF entry
- JE = Junior exempt
- w/o = Walkover
- r = Retired
- d = Defaulted
- SR = Special ranking

First round
1	(United States) B Bryan (United States) M Bryan	6	6
WC	(United States) A Kim (United States) C Mamiit	2	4
(South Africa) D Adams (France) M Llodra	6	6^{4}	6
(Japan) T Shimada (United States) J Waite	3	7^{7}	4
4	(Australia) P Kilderry (Australia) S Stolle	6	6
WC	(United States) R Ginepri (United States) P King	3	2
(United States) P Goldstein (United States) J Thomas	6^{4}	3
(Germany) T Haas (Belarus) M Mirnyi	7^{7}	6
(Netherlands) S Schalken (Czech Republic) D Vacek	6	6
WC	(United States) T Dent (United States) M Fish	4	4
(United States) J Blake (United States) S Humphries	3	3
3	(United States) J Gimelstob (United States) A O'Brien	6	6
(United States) J-M Gambill (United States) A Roddick	7^{7}	6
WC	(United States) L Cook (United States) L Harper-Griffith	6^{1}	2
(South Africa) M Wakefield (United States) G Weiner	7	4	7^{7}
2	(Zimbabwe) W Black (Zimbabwe) K Ullyett	5	6	6^{3}

Quarterfinals
1	(United States) B Bryan (United States) M Bryan	7	6
(South Africa) D Adams (France) M Llodra	5	3
4	(Australia) P Kilderry (Australia) S Stolle	2	6^{4}
(Germany) T Haas (Belarus) M Mirnyi	6	7^{7}
(Netherlands) S Schalken (Czech Republic) D Vacek	4	6	3
3	(United States) J Gimelstob (United States) A O'Brien	6	4	6
(United States) J-M Gambill (United States) A Roddick	7	6
(South Africa) M Wakefield (United States) G Weiner	5	3

Semifinals
1	(United States) B Bryan (United States) M Bryan	6	6
(Germany) T Haas (Belarus) M Mirnyi	4	2
3	(United States) J Gimelstob (United States) A O'Brien	6^{3}	6	3
(United States) J-M Gambill (United States) A Roddick	7^{7}	4	6

Final
1	(United States) B Bryan (United States) M Bryan	7	7^{8}
(United States) J-M Gambill (United States) A Roddick	5	6^{6}
