= 2001 Mercedes-Benz Cup =

Tennis tournament

- Date: July 23–29
- Edition: 74th
- Category: International Series
- Draw: 32S / 16D
- Prize money: $375,000
- Surface: Hard / outdoor
- Location: Los Angeles, United States
- Venue: Los Angeles Tennis Center

Champions

Singles
- (United States) Andre Agassi

Doubles
- (United States) Bob Bryan / (United States) Mike Bryan
← 2000 ·	Los Angeles Open	· 2002 →

The 2001 Mercedes-Benz Cup was a men's tennis tournament played on outdoor hard courts at the Los Angeles Tennis Center in Los Angeles, California in the United States and was part of the International Series of the 2001 ATP Tour. The tournament ran from July 23 through July 29, 2001. Third-seeded Andre Agassi won the singles title.

== Finals ==
=== Singles ===
(United States) Andre Agassi defeated (United States) Pete Sampras 6–4, 6–2

- It was Agassi's 4th title of the year and the 50th of his career.

=== Doubles ===
(United States) Bob Bryan / (United States) Mike Bryan defeated (United States) Jan-Michael Gambill / (United States) Andy Roddick 7–5, 7–6^{(8–6)}

- It was Bob Bryan's 4th title of the year and the 4th of his career. It was Mike Bryan's 4th title of the year and the 4th of his career.

== See also ==
- Agassi–Sampras rivalry
