= 2002 Mercedes-Benz Cup =

- Date: July 22–28
- Edition: 75th
- Category: International Series
- Draw: 32S / 16D
- Prize money: $375,000
- Surface: Hard / outdoor
- Location: Los Angeles, United States
- Venue: Los Angeles Tennis Center

Champions

Singles
- (United States) Andre Agassi

Doubles
- (France) Sébastien Grosjean / (Germany) Nicolas Kiefer
← 2001 ·	Los Angeles Open	· 2003 →

The 2002 Mercedes-Benz Cup was a men's tennis tournament played on outdoor hard courts at the Los Angeles Tennis Center in Los Angeles, California in the United States and was part of the International Series of the 2002 ATP Tour. The tournament ran from July 22 through July 28, 2002. Second-seeded and defending champion Andre Agassi won the singles title.

== Finals ==
=== Singles ===
(United States) Andre Agassi defeated (United States) Jan-Michael Gambill 6–2, 6–4

- It was Agassi's 4th title of the year and the 54th of his career.

=== Doubles ===
(France) Sébastien Grosjean / (Germany) Nicolas Kiefer defeated (United States) Justin Gimelstob / (France) Michaël Llodra 6–4, 6–4

- It was Grosjean's 1st title of the year and the 4th of his career. It was Kiefer's only title of the year and the 8th of his career.
