= 2000 Mercedes-Benz Cup – Doubles =

Doubles
- 2000 Mercedes-Benz Cup

Final
- Champions: (Australia) Paul Kilderry (Australia) Sandon Stolle
- Runners-up: (United States) Jan-Michael Gambill (United States) Scott Humphries
- Score: Walkover

Details
- Draw: 16
- Seeds: 4

Events
Singles	Doubles
← 1999 ·	Los Angeles Open	· 2001 →

Byron Black and Wayne Ferreira were the defending champions, but Black did not compete this year. Ferreira teamed up with Kevin Ullyett and lost in the semifinals to tournament runner-ups Jan-Michael Gambill and Scott Humphries.

Paul Kilderry and Sandon Stolle won the title by walkover, as Gambill was injured during the singles final due to knee and ankle sprains.

== Seeds ==
1. (United States) Justin Gimelstob / (United States) Rick Leach (semifinals)
2. (South Africa) Wayne Ferreira / (Zimbabwe) Kevin Ullyett (semifinals)
3. (United States) Jan-Michael Gambill / (United States) Scott Humphries (final, withdrew due to knee and ankle sprains on Gambill)
4. (Australia) Paul Kilderry / (Australia) Sandon Stolle (champions)

== Draw ==
=== Key ===
- Q = Qualifier
- WC = Wild card
- LL = Lucky loser
- Alt = Alternate
- SE = Special exempt
- PR = Protected ranking
- ITF = ITF entry
- JE = Junior exempt
- w/o = Walkover
- r = Retired
- d = Defaulted
- SR = Special ranking

=== Draw ===
First round
1	(United States) J Gimelstob (United States) R Leach	6	6
WC	(United States) Z Fleishman (United States) JP Fruttero	4	4
(South Africa) M Ondruska (Australia) P Tramacchi	6	5	7^{7}
(France) A Clément (Italy) L Tieleman	2	7	6^{4}
4	(Australia) P Kilderry (Australia) S Stolle	4	6	7^{7}
(United States) B Coupe (United States) P Goldstein	6	3	6^{2}
Q	(United States) M Keil (United States) J Williams	7	6
(United Kingdom) K Spencer (United States) M Sprengelmeyer	5	4
WC	(United States) T Dent (United States) B Hansen-Dent	3	6	6
(United States) B Bryan (United States) M Bryan	6	3	4
(South Africa) N Godwin (Philippines) E Taino	2	3
3	(United States) JM Gambill (United States) S Humphries	6	6
WC	(United States) M Jensen (Philippines) C Mamiit	7	6
(Canada) S Lareau (Canada) J Robichaud	5	3
(South Africa) M Barnard (United States) A Peterson	1	4
2	(South Africa) W Ferreira (Zimbabwe) K Ullyett	6	6

Quarterfinals
1	(United States) J Gimelstob (United States) R Leach	6	7^{7}
(South Africa) M Ondruska (Australia) P Tramacchi	4	6^{3}
4	(Australia) P Kilderry (Australia) S Stolle	6	6
Q	(United States) M Keil (United States) J Williams	4	4
WC	(United States) T Dent (United States) B Hansen-Dent	7^{7}	4	6^{5}
3	(United States) JM Gambill (United States) S Humphries	6^{3}	6	7^{7}
WC	(United States) M Jensen (Philippines) C Mamiit	3	7	2
2	(South Africa) W Ferreira (Zimbabwe) K Ullyett	6	5	6

Semifinals
1	(United States) J Gimelstob (United States) R Leach	4	1
4	(Australia) P Kilderry (Australia) S Stolle	6	6
3	(United States) JM Gambill (United States) S Humphries	6	6^{3}	6
2	(South Africa) W Ferreira (Zimbabwe) K Ullyett	4	7^{7}	3

Final
4	(Australia) P Kilderry (Australia) S Stolle	w/o
3	(United States) JM Gambill (United States) S Humphries
