= 1999 Mercedes-Benz Cup – Doubles =

Doubles
- 1999 Mercedes-Benz Cup

Final
- Champions: (Zimbabwe) Byron Black (South Africa) Wayne Ferreira
- Runners-up: (Croatia) Goran Ivanišević (United States) Brian MacPhie
- Score: 6–2, 7–6^{(7–4)}

Details
- Draw: 16
- Seeds: 4

Events
| Singles | Doubles |
- Los Angeles Open

Patrick Rafter and Sandon Stolle were the defending champions, but Rafter did not compete this year. Stolle teamed up with Wayne Black and lost in the semifinals to Byron Black and Wayne Ferreira.

Byron Black and Ferreira won the title by defeating Goran Ivanišević and Brian MacPhie 6–2, 7–6^{(7–4)} in the final.

== Seeds ==
1. (Sweden) Jonas Björkman / (India) Leander Paes (quarterfinals)
2. (Zimbabwe) Wayne Black / (Australia) Sandon Stolle (semifinals)
3. (South Africa) John-Laffnie de Jager / (United States) Jim Grabb (quarterfinals)
4. (United States) Justin Gimelstob / (United States) Scott Humphries (quarterfinals)

== Draw ==
Key

- Q = Qualifier
- WC = Wild card
- LL = Lucky loser
- Alt = Alternate
- ITF = ITF entry
- PR = Protected ranking
- SR = Special ranking
- SE = Special exempt
- JE = Junior exempt
- JR = Junior Accelerator Programme entrant
- CO = College Accelerator Programme entrant
- NG = Next Gen Accelerator Program entrant
- w/o = Walkover
- r = Retired
- d = Defaulted

=== Draw ===
First round
1 | (Sweden) J Björkman (India) L Paes | 6 | 6
(Australia) A Florent (Australia) P Kilderry | 2 | 3
(South Africa) M Barnard (South Africa) B Haygarth | 3 | 1
(Czech Republic) M Damm (United States) A Peterson | 6 | 6
4 | (United States) J Gimelstob (United States) S Humphries | 6 | 6^{5} | 6
(United States) G Grant (Australia) M Tebbutt | 3 | 7^{7} | 4
WC | (United States) JM Gambill (United States) R Leach | 3 | 4
(Croatia) G Ivanišević (United States) B MacPhie | 6 | 6
(Zimbabwe) B Black (South Africa) W Ferreira | 6 | 6
WC | (United States) P Annacone (United States) P Sampras | 4 | 2
WC | (Sweden) T Enqvist (Sweden) M Larsson | 3 | 6 | 2
3 | (South Africa) JL de Jager (United States) J Grabb | 6 | 4 | 6
(United States) B Coupe (Philippines) E Taino | 2 | 4
(Australia) L Hewitt (Australia) M Woodforde | 6 | 6
Q | (United States) M Joyce (United Kingdom) K Spencer | 2 | 1
2 | (Zimbabwe) W Black (Australia) S Stolle | 6 | 6

Quarterfinals
1 | (Sweden) J Björkman (India) L Paes | 3 | 6 | 3
(Czech Republic) M Damm (United States) A Peterson | 6 | 3 | 6
4 | (United States) J Gimelstob (United States) S Humphries | 7^{7} | 4 | 2
(Croatia) G Ivanišević (United States) B MacPhie | 6^{1} | 6 | 6
(Zimbabwe) B Black (South Africa) W Ferreira | 7^{7} | 6
3 | (South Africa) JL de Jager (United States) J Grabb | 6^{4} | 1
(Australia) L Hewitt (Australia) M Woodforde | 6 | 3 | 2
2 | (Zimbabwe) W Black (Australia) S Stolle | 3 | 6 | 6

Semifinals
(Czech Republic) M Damm (United States) A Peterson | 3 | 5
(Croatia) G Ivanišević (United States) B MacPhie | 6 | 7
(Zimbabwe) B Black (South Africa) W Ferreira | 6 | 6
2 | (Zimbabwe) W Black (Australia) S Stolle | 4 | 2

Final
(Croatia) G Ivanišević (United States) B MacPhie | 2 | 6^{4}
(Zimbabwe) B Black (South Africa) W Ferreira | 6 | 7^{7}
