= 1980 Jack Kramer Open =

1980 Pacific Southwest Open
- Date: April 14–20
- Edition: 54th
- Category: Grand Prix
- Draw: 64S / 32D
- Prize money: $175,000
- Surface: Hard / outdoor
- Location: Fountain Valley, US

Champions

Singles
- (United States) Gene Mayer

Doubles
- (United States) Brian Teacher / (United States) Butch Walts
| ← 1979 · | Pacific Southwest Open | · 1981 → |

The 1980 Jack Kramer Open, also known as the Pacific Southwest Open, was a men's tennis tournament played on outdoor hard courts at the Los Caballeros Tennis Club in Fountain Valley, California in the United States. The event was part of the Grand Prix tennis circuit. It was the 54th edition of the Pacific Southwest tournament and was held from April 14 through April 20, 1980. First-seeded Gene Mayer won the singles title and the corresponding $27,500 first-prize money.

== Finals ==
=== Singles ===
(United States) Gene Mayer defeated (United States) Brian Teacher 6–3, 6–2

- It was Mayer's 3rd singles title of the year and the 5th of his career.

=== Doubles ===
(United States) Brian Teacher / (United States) Butch Walts defeated (India) Anand Amritraj / (United States) John Austin 6–2, 6–4
