= 2003 Mercedes-Benz Cup – Doubles =

Doubles
- 2003 Mercedes-Benz Cup

Final
- Champions: (United States) Jan-Michael Gambill (United States) Travis Parrott
- Runners-up: (Australia) Joshua Eagle (Netherlands) Sjeng Schalken
- Score: 6–4, 3–6, 7–5

Details
- Draw: 16
- Seeds: 4

Events
Singles	Doubles
← 2002 ·	Los Angeles Open	· 2004 →

Sébastien Grosjean and Nicolas Kiefer were the defending champions but lost in the quarterfinals to Kenneth Carlsen and Xavier Malisse.

Jan-Michael Gambill and Travis Parrott won in the final 6–4, 3–6, 7–5 against Joshua Eagle and Sjeng Schalken.

== Seeds ==
1. (United States) Rick Leach / (United States) Brian MacPhie (quarterfinals)
2. (South Africa) David Adams / (Australia) Andrew Kratzmann (first round)
3. (United States) Scott Humphries / (The Bahamas) Mark Merklein (semifinals)
4. (Australia) Joshua Eagle / (Netherlands) Sjeng Schalken (final)

== Draw ==
=== Key ===
- Q = Qualifier
- WC = Wild card
- LL = Lucky loser
- Alt = Alternate
- SE = Special exempt
- PR = Protected ranking
- ITF = ITF entry
- JE = Junior exempt
- w/o = Walkover
- r = Retired
- d = Defaulted
- SR = Special ranking

First round
1	(United States) R Leach (United States) B MacPhie	7^{7}	6
WC	(India) P Amritraj (India) S Amritraj	6^{5}	4
(Australia) S Huss (South Africa) M Wakefield	4	2
WC	(United States) J-M Gambill (United States) T Parrott	6	6
3	(United States) S Humphries (The Bahamas) M Merklein	2	7	6
(South Korea) H-T Lee (United States) C Mamiit	6	5	3
(South Africa) W Ferreira (United States) J Gimelstob	6	2	5
(Australia) L Hewitt (Australia) M Philippoussis	4	6	7
(Brazil) G Kuerten (United States) E Taino	6
(South Africa) J-L de Jager (United States) J Tarango	2	r
(Russia) D Golovanov (Russia) M Safin	6^{3}	2
4	(Australia) J Eagle (Netherlands) S Schalken	7^{7}	6
(France) S Grosjean (Germany) N Kiefer	6	6^{5}	6
(United States) A Bogomolov Jr. (United States) R Ginepri	3	7^{7}	3
(Denmark) K Carlsen (Belgium) X Malisse	6	6
2	(South Africa) D Adams (Australia) A Kratzmann	2	4

Quarterfinals
1	(United States) R Leach (United States) B MacPhie	3	4
WC	(United States) J-M Gambill (United States) T Parrott	6	6
3	(United States) S Humphries (The Bahamas) M Merklein	6	5	6
(Australia) L Hewitt (Australia) M Philippoussis	3	7	4
(Brazil) G Kuerten (United States) E Taino	3	2
4	(Australia) J Eagle (Netherlands) S Schalken	6	6
(France) S Grosjean (Germany) N Kiefer	4	7^{7}	3
(Denmark) K Carlsen (Belgium) X Malisse	6	6^{1}	6

Semifinals
WC	(United States) J-M Gambill (United States) T Parrott	6	6^{3}	7^{7}
3	(United States) S Humphries (The Bahamas) M Merklein	2	7^{7}	6^{2}
4	(Australia) J Eagle (Netherlands) S Schalken	7^{7}	3	7
(Denmark) K Carlsen (Belgium) X Malisse	6^{1}	6	5

Final
WC	(United States) J-M Gambill (United States) T Parrott	6	3	7
4	(Australia) J Eagle (Netherlands) S Schalken	4	6	5
