= 2003 Mercedes-Benz Cup – Singles =

Singles
- 2003 Mercedes-Benz Cup

Final
- Champion: (South Africa) Wayne Ferreira
- Runner-up: (Australia) Lleyton Hewitt
- Score: 6–3, 4–6, 7–5

Details
- Draw: 32 (4 Q / 3 WC )
- Seeds: 8

Events
Singles	Doubles
- Los Angeles Open

Andre Agassi was the defending champion, but did not compete that year.

Wayne Ferreira won in the final 6–3, 4–6, 7–5 against Lleyton Hewitt.

== Seeds ==
1. (Australia) Lleyton Hewitt (final)
2. (France) Sébastien Grosjean (quarterfinals)
3. (Netherlands) Sjeng Schalken (second round)
4. (Brazil) Gustavo Kuerten (quarterfinals)
5. (Australia) Mark Philippoussis (semifinals)
6. (Russia) Marat Safin (first round)
7. (South Africa) Wayne Ferreira (champion)
8. (United States) Vince Spadea (quarterfinals)

== Draw ==
Key

- Q = Qualifier
- WC = Wild card
- LL = Lucky loser
- Alt = Alternate
- ITF = ITF entry
- PR = Protected ranking
- SR = Special ranking
- SE = Special exempt
- JE = Junior exempt
- JR = Junior Accelerator Programme entrant
- CO = College Accelerator Programme entrant
- NG = Next Gen Accelerator Program entrant
- w/o = Walkover
- r = Retired
- d = Defaulted

=== Finals ===
Semifinals
1	(Australia) Lleyton Hewitt	6	6
(Germany) Nicolas Kiefer	2	4
5	(Australia) Mark Philippoussis	4	5
7	(South Africa) Wayne Ferreira	6	7

Final
1	(Australia) Lleyton Hewitt	3	6	5
7	(South Africa) Wayne Ferreira	6	4	7

=== Top half ===
First round
1	(Australia) L Hewitt	6	7
(United States) C Mamiit	0	5
WC	(United States) M Joyce	7^{7}	2	7^{7}
(United States) J-M Gambill	6^{5}	6	6^{4}
(Denmark) K Carlsen	6	4	7^{7}
WC	(United States) B Reynolds	2	6	6^{3}
WC	(India) P Amritraj	5
6	(Russia) M Safin	3^{r}
3	(Netherlands) S Schalken	6	6
Q	(Russia) D Golovanov	4	4
(Germany) N Kiefer	6	6
(France) N Thomann	1	4
(Czech Republic) J Vacek	2	6	6
(United States) K Kim	6	1	4
(United States) J Gimelstob	4	3
8	(United States) V Spadea	6	6

Second round
1	(Australia) L Hewitt	6	6
WC	(United States) M Joyce	3	0
(Denmark) K Carlsen	6	6
WC	(India) P Amritraj	4	2
3	(Netherlands) S Schalken	4	4
(Germany) N Kiefer	6	6
(Czech Republic) J Vacek	5	6	2
8	(United States) V Spadea	7	2	6

Quarterfinals
1	(Australia) L Hewitt	6^{3}	6	6
(Denmark) K Carlsen	7^{7}	4	3
(Germany) N Kiefer	1	7	6
8	(United States) V Spadea	6	5	3

Semifinals
1	(Australia) L Hewitt	6	6
(Germany) N Kiefer	2	4

=== Bottom half ===
First round
5	(Australia) M Philippoussis	6	6
(Australia) A Kennedy	3	2
Q	(United States) Z Fleishman	1	1
(United States) M Chang	6	6
(South Korea) H-T Lee	6	6^{5}	2
(United States) E Taino	3	7^{7}	6
(Canada) F Niemeyer	6	6^{2}	4
4	(Brazil) G Kuerten	3	7^{7}	6
7	(South Africa) W Ferreira	6	6
Q	(United States) R Yim	4	4
(United States) A Bogomolov Jr.	6	6
(Brazil) R Mello	3	2
(United States) R Ginepri	6	6
Q	(Australia) A Ilie	1	1
(Belgium) X Malisse	6	5	3
2	(France) S Grosjean	4	7	6

Second round
5	(Australia) M Philippoussis	6	6
(United States) M Chang	2	4
(United States) E Taino	3	6^{5}
4	(Brazil) G Kuerten	6	7^{7}
7	(South Africa) W Ferreira	7^{7}	6
(United States) A Bogomolov Jr.	6^{1}	3
(United States) R Ginepri	2	3
2	(France) S Grosjean	6	6

Quarterfinals
5	(Australia) M Philippoussis	6	3	7^{7}
4	(Brazil) G Kuerten	3	6	6^{5}
7	(South Africa) W Ferreira	7^{7}	6^{4}	6
2	(France) S Grosjean	6^{4}	7^{7}	2

Semifinals
5	(Australia) M Philippoussis	4	5
7	(South Africa) W Ferreira	6	7
