= 2002 Mercedes-Benz Cup – Doubles =

Doubles
- 2002 Mercedes-Benz Cup

Final
- Champions: (France) Sébastien Grosjean (Germany) Nicolas Kiefer
- Runners-up: (United States) Justin Gimelstob (France) Michaël Llodra
- Score: 6–4, 6–4

Details
- Draw: 16
- Seeds: 4

Events
Singles	Doubles
← 2001 ·	Los Angeles Open	· 2003 →

Bob Bryan and Mike Bryan were the defending champions but lost in the semifinals to Sébastien Grosjean and Nicolas Kiefer.

Grosjean and Kiefer won in the final 6–4, 6–4 against Justin Gimelstob and Michaël Llodra.

== Seeds ==
1. (United States) Donald Johnson / (United States) Jared Palmer (quarterfinals)
2. (United States) Bob Bryan / (United States) Mike Bryan (semifinals)
3. (South Africa) David Adams / (Netherlands) Sjeng Schalken (first round)
4. (South Africa) Neville Godwin / (Zimbabwe) Kevin Ullyett (quarterfinals)

== Draw ==
=== Key ===
- Q = Qualifier
- WC = Wild card
- LL = Lucky loser
- Alt = Alternate
- SE = Special exempt
- PR = Protected ranking
- ITF = ITF entry
- JE = Junior exempt
- w/o = Walkover
- r = Retired
- d = Defaulted
- SR = Special ranking

First round
1	(United States) D Johnson (United States) J Palmer	6	6
(Australia) J Crabb (Australia) P Luczak	3	3
(United States) J Gimelstob (France) M Llodra	4	6	6
WC	(United States) K Kim (United States) J Salzenstein	6	3	4
4	(South Africa) N Godwin (Zimbabwe) K Ullyett	6	6^{8}	6
(United States) A Roddick (United States) J Tarango	3	7^{10}	3
(Switzerland) G Bastl (Australia) S Stolle	6	6^{3}	2
WC	(India) P Amritraj (India) S Amritraj	4	7^{7}	6
(United States) R Ginepri (United States) C Mamiit	3	5
(United States) J-M Gambill (United States) G Oliver	6	7
(France) S Grosjean (Germany) N Kiefer	6	6
3	(South Africa) D Adams (Netherlands) S Schalken	4	4
(The Bahamas) M Merklein (United States) G Weiner	6	6
WC	(United States) L Cook (United States) P King	4	2
(Italy) D Sanguinetti (Thailand) P Srichaphan	1	1
2	(United States) B Bryan (United States) M Bryan	6	6

Quarterfinals
1	(United States) D Johnson (United States) J Palmer	6	4	6^{7}
(United States) J Gimelstob (France) M Llodra	4	6	7^{9}
4	(South Africa) N Godwin (Zimbabwe) K Ullyett	3	4
WC	(India) P Amritraj (India) S Amritraj	6	6
(United States) J-M Gambill (United States) G Oliver	6	4	4
(France) S Grosjean (Germany) N Kiefer	4	6	6
(The Bahamas) M Merklein (United States) G Weiner	1	4
2	(United States) B Bryan (United States) M Bryan	6	6

Semifinals
(United States) J Gimelstob (France) M Llodra	6	6
WC	(India) P Amritraj (India) S Amritraj	3	2
(France) S Grosjean (Germany) N Kiefer	3	6	6
2	(United States) B Bryan (United States) M Bryan	6	3	2

Final
(United States) J Gimelstob (France) M Llodra	4	4
(France) S Grosjean (Germany) N Kiefer	6	6
