= 1999 Mercedes-Benz Cup – Singles =

Singles
- 1999 Mercedes-Benz Cup

Final
- Champion: (United States) Pete Sampras
- Runner-up: (United States) Andre Agassi
- Score: 7–6^{(7–3)}, 7–6^{(7–1)}

Details
- Draw: 32 (3WC/4Q/1LL)
- Seeds: 8

Events
Singles	Doubles
← 1998 ·	Los Angeles Open	· 2000 →

Andre Agassi was the defending champion, but was defeated in the final to Pete Sampras with a score of 7–6^{(7–3)}, 7–6^{(7–1)}. By reaching the final, Sampras completed his 271st week at the world No. 1 ranking in his career, surpassing the previous record of 270 weeks established by Ivan Lendl.

== Seeds ==
1. (United States) Andre Agassi (final)
2. (United States) Pete Sampras (champion)
3. (United Kingdom) Tim Henman (first round)
4. (n/a)
5. (Sweden) Thomas Enqvist (second round)
6. (Croatia) Goran Ivanišević (second round)
7. (Australia) Lleyton Hewitt (quarterfinals, retired)
8. (South Africa) Wayne Ferreira (quarterfinals)

== Draw ==
=== Key ===
- Q = Qualifier
- WC = Wild card
- LL = Lucky loser
- Alt = Alternate
- ITF = ITF entry
- PR = Protected ranking
- SR = Special ranking
- SE = Special exempt
- JE = Junior exempt
- JR = Junior Accelerator Programme entrant
- CO = College Accelerator Programme entrant
- NG = Next Gen Accelerator Program entrant
- w/o = Walkover
- r = Retired
- d = Defaulted

=== Finals ===
Semifinals
1	(United States) Andre Agassi	6	6
(Australia) Andrew Ilie	4	2
Q	(Australia) James Sekulov	0	2
2	(United States) Pete Sampras	6	6

Final
1	(United States) Andre Agassi	6^{3}	6^{1}
2	(United States) Pete Sampras	7^{7}	7^{7}

=== Top half ===
First round
1	(United States) A Agassi	6	6
(United States) JM Gambill	2	2
Q	(Philippines) E Taino	7^{7}	6
(India) L Paes	6^{4}	1
(Canada) D Nestor	6^{5}	3
(Germany) A Pretzsch	7^{7}	6
WC	(United States) A O'Brien	3	2
7	(Australia) L Hewitt	6	6
LL	(Thailand) P Srichaphan	2	1
Q	(Sweden) M Larsson	6	6
(Sweden) J Björkman	4	4
(France) A Dupuis	6	6
(Zimbabwe) B Black	4	6^{8}
(Australia) A Ilie	6	7^{10}
(Belarus) M Mirnyi	3	3
6	(Croatia) G Ivanišević	6	6

Second round
1	(United States) A Agassi	6	6
Q	(Philippines) E Taino	2	3
(Germany) A Pretzsch	3	1
7	(Australia) L Hewitt	6	6
Q	(Sweden) M Larsson
(France) A Dupuis	w/o
(Australia) A Ilie	6	6
6	(Croatia) G Ivanišević	4	4

Quarterfinals
1	(United States) A Agassi	5
7	(Australia) L Hewitt	4^{r}
(France) A Dupuis	7^{8}	4	4
(Australia) A Ilie	6^{6}	6	6

Semifinals
1	(United States) A Agassi	6	6
(Australia) A Ilie	4	2

=== Bottom half ===
First round
5	(Sweden) T Enqvist	6	6
(Australia) M Woodforde	3	4
(Czech Republic) M Damm	5	6	5
Q	(Australia) J Sekulov	7	4	7
(United States) M Chang	6	6
(Zimbabwe) W Black	3	1
(France) G Raoux	6	7^{7}
3	(United Kingdom) T Henman	4	6^{4}
8	(South Africa) W Ferreira	6	7^{7}
(United States) G Grant	4	6^{2}
(United States) J Gimelstob	6	6
WC	(United States) T Dent	2	2
(Canada) S Lareau	6	6
Q	(United States) D Wheaton	4	2
WC	(United States) P King	1	2
2	(United States) P Sampras	6	6

Second round
5	(Sweden) T Enqvist	7^{7}	4	3
Q	(Australia) J Sekulov	6^{1}	6	6
(United States) M Chang	6	6
(France) G Raoux	4	2
8	(South Africa) W Ferreira	5	7	6
(United States) J Gimelstob	7	5	2
(Canada) S Lareau	6^{5}	3
2	(United States) P Sampras	7^{7}	6

Quarterfinals
Q	(Australia) J Sekulov	2	6	6
(United States) M Chang	6	2	2
8	(South Africa) W Ferreira	6	3	3
2	(United States) P Sampras	4	6	6

Semifinals
Q	(Australia) J Sekulov	0	2
2	(United States) P Sampras	6	6
