= 2003 Mercedes-Benz Cup =

- Date: July 28 – August 3
- Edition: 76th
- Category: International Series
- Draw: 32S / 16D
- Prize money: $355,000
- Surface: Hard / outdoor
- Location: Los Angeles, CA, United States
- Venue: Los Angeles Tennis Center

Champions

Singles
- (South Africa) Wayne Ferreira

Doubles
- (United States) Jan-Michael Gambill / (United States) Travis Parrott
- Los Angeles Open

The 2003 Mercedes-Benz Cup was a men's tennis tournament played on outdoor hard courts at the Los Angeles Tennis Center in Los Angeles, California in the United States and was part of the International Series of the 2003 ATP Tour. The tournament ran from July 28 through August 3, 2003. Seventh-seeded Wayne Ferreira won the singles title.

== Finals ==
=== Singles ===
(South Africa) Wayne Ferreira defeated (Australia) Lleyton Hewitt 6–3, 4–6, 7–5

- It was Ferreira's only singles title of the year and the 15th of his career.

=== Doubles ===
(United States) Jan-Michael Gambill / (United States) Travis Parrott defeated (Australia) Joshua Eagle / (Netherlands) Sjeng Schalken 6–4, 3–6, 7–5

- It was Gambill's 2nd title of the year and the 8th of his career. It was Parrott's only title of the year and the 1st of his career.
