= 1999 Mercedes-Benz Cup =

- Date: 26 July – 1 August
- Edition: 72nd
- Category: World Series
- Draw: 32S / 16D
- Prize money: $325,000
- Surface: Hard / outdoor
- Location: Los Angeles, United States
- Venue: Los Angeles Tennis Center

Champions

Singles
- (United States) Pete Sampras

Doubles
- (Zimbabwe) Byron Black / (South Africa) Wayne Ferreira
- Los Angeles Open

The 1999 Mercedes-Benz Cup was a men's tennis tournament played on outdoor Hard at the Los Angeles Tennis Center in Los Angeles, United States that was part of the World Series of the 1999 ATP Tour. It was the 72nd edition of the tournament and was held from 26 July through 1 August 1999. Second-seeded Pete Sampras won the singles title, his second at the event after 1991, and earned $46,000 first-prize money.

== Finals ==
=== Singles ===
(United States) Pete Sampras defeated (United States) Andre Agassi, 7–6^{(7–3)}, 7–6^{(7–1)}

- It was Sampras's 3rd singles title of the year and the 59th of his career

=== Doubles ===
(Zimbabwe) Byron Black / (South Africa) Wayne Ferreira defeated (Croatia) Goran Ivanišević / (United States) Brian MacPhie 6–2, 7–6^{(7–4)}

== See also ==
- Agassi–Sampras rivalry
