= 2002 Mercedes-Benz Cup – Singles =

Singles
- 2002 Mercedes-Benz Cup

Final
- Champion: (United States) Andre Agassi
- Runner-up: (United States) Jan-Michael Gambill
- Score: 6–2, 6–4

Details
- Draw: 32 (4 Q / 3 WC )
- Seeds: 8

Events
Singles	Doubles
- Los Angeles Open

Andre Agassi was the defending champion and won in the final 6–2, 6–4 against Jan-Michael Gambill.

== Seeds ==
1. (Germany) Tommy Haas (first round)
2. (United States) Andre Agassi (champion)
3. (France) Sébastien Grosjean (second round)
4. (United States) Andy Roddick (semifinals)
5. (Brazil) Gustavo Kuerten (quarterfinals)
6. (Netherlands) Sjeng Schalken (first round)
7. (Belgium) Xavier Malisse (quarterfinals)
8. (Belarus) Max Mirnyi (semifinals)

== Draw ==
Key

- Q = Qualifier
- WC = Wild card
- LL = Lucky loser
- Alt = Alternate
- ITF = ITF entry
- PR = Protected ranking
- SR = Special ranking
- SE = Special exempt
- JE = Junior exempt
- JR = Junior Accelerator Programme entrant
- CO = College Accelerator Programme entrant
- NG = Next Gen Accelerator Program entrant
- w/o = Walkover
- r = Retired
- d = Defaulted

=== Finals ===
Semifinals
(United States) Jan-Michael Gambill	7	6
4	(United States) Andy Roddick	5	3
8	(Belarus) Max Mirnyi	4	2
2	(United States) Andre Agassi	6	6

Final
(United States) Jan-Michael Gambill	2	4
2	(United States) Andre Agassi	6	6

=== Top half ===
First round
1	(Germany) T Haas	4	4
Q	(United States) A Bogomolov Jr.	6	6
(Germany) N Kiefer	7	6
WC	(United States) J Gimelstob	5	1
(United States) J-M Gambill	4	6	7^{9}
(United States) M Chang	6	2	6^{7}
(Israel) N Okun	7^{7}	7^{7}
6	(Netherlands) S Schalken	6^{5}	6^{4}
4	(United States) A Roddick	6^{5}	6	6
(South Korea) H-T Lee	7^{7}	1	2
WC	(United States) B Vahaly	6	6
(Italy) D Sanguinetti	3	1
(South Africa) N Godwin	3	4
(United States) T Dent	6	6
Q	(Australia) S Draper	4	6^{4}
7	(Belgium) X Malisse	6	7^{7}

Second round
Q	(United States) A Bogomolov Jr.	3	3
(Germany) N Kiefer	6	6
(United States) J-M Gambill	7^{7}	6
(Israel) N Okun	6^{2}	2
4	(United States) A Roddick	7	6
WC	(United States) B Vahaly	5	4
(United States) T Dent	1	6	4
7	(Belgium) X Malisse	6	4	6

Quarterfinals
(Germany) N Kiefer	5	6^{5}
(United States) J-M Gambill	7	7^{7}
4	(United States) A Roddick	6	6
7	(Belgium) X Malisse	4	4

Semifinals
(United States) J-M Gambill	7	6
4	(United States) A Roddick	5	3

=== Bottom half ===
First round
8	(Belarus) M Mirnyi	6	6
(United States) C Mamiit	4	4
(Thailand) P Srichaphan	7^{7}	3	7^{7}
(United States) V Spadea	6^{5}	6	6^{2}
WC	(United States) K Kim	4	4
(France) M Llodra	6	6
Q	(United States) J Brasington	1	2
3	(France) S Grosjean	6	6
5	(Brazil) G Kuerten	7	7^{9}
Q	(Switzerland) G Bastl	5	6^{7}
(United Kingdom) M Lee	6	7
(Japan) T Suzuki	4	5
(Israel) H Levy	3	2
(United States) R Ginepri	6	6
(Denmark) K Carlsen	3	1
2	(United States) A Agassi	6	6

Second round
8	(Belarus) M Mirnyi	7^{7}	6
(Thailand) P Srichaphan	6^{3}	4
(France) M Llodra	6	3	7^{7}
3	(France) S Grosjean	3	6	6^{3}
5	(Brazil) G Kuerten	7	7^{7}
(United Kingdom) M Lee	5	6^{5}
(United States) R Ginepri	3	1
2	(United States) A Agassi	6	6

Quarterfinals
8	(Belarus) M Mirnyi	6	7^{7}
(France) M Llodra	4	6^{4}
5	(Brazil) G Kuerten	6^{3}	6	4
2	(United States) A Agassi	7^{7}	3	6

Semifinals
8	(Belarus) M Mirnyi	4	2
2	(United States) A Agassi	6	6
