= 1995 Lipton Championships – Men's singles =

Annex

Men's singles
- 1995 Lipton Championships

Final
- Champion: (United States) Andre Agassi
- Runner-up: (United States) Pete Sampras
- Score: 3–6, 6–2, 7–6^{(7–3)}

Details
- Draw: 96 (12Q / 5WC)
- Seeds: 32

Events
Singles	men	women
Doubles	men	women
← 1994 ·	Miami Open	· 1996 →

Andre Agassi defeated the two-time defending champion Pete Sampras in the final, 3–6, 6–2, 7–6^{(7–3)} to win the men's singles tennis title at the 1995 Miami Open. The final was a rematch of the Indian Wells final two weeks earlier, and Sampras was attempting to complete the Sunshine Double.

With the score tied 2–2 in the second set, Agassi found himself down 0–30 on his serve. He then won an amazing 17 points in a row en route to taking the second set, and ultimately the match.

== Seeds ==
1. (United States) Pete Sampras (final)
2. (United States) Andre Agassi (champion)
3. (United States) Michael Chang (third round)
4. (Spain) Alberto Berasategui (third round)
5. (Germany) Michael Stich (second round)
6. (Netherlands) Richard Krajicek (second round)
7. (United States) Jim Courier (third round)
8. (South Africa) Wayne Ferreira (quarterfinals)
9. (United States) Todd Martin (second round)
10. (Ukraine) Andriy Medvedev (quarterfinals)
11. (Sweden) Stefan Edberg (second round)
12. (Sweden) Magnus Larsson (semifinals)
13. (Sweden) Thomas Enqvist (fourth round)
14. (Australia) Patrick Rafter (second round)
15. (Netherlands) Jacco Eltingh (second round)
16. (Spain) Álex Corretja (second round)
17. (Australia) Jason Stoltenberg (second round)
18. (Germany) Bernd Karbacher (fourth round)
19. (Czech Republic) Karel Nováček (second round)
20. (United States) David Wheaton (third round)
21. (Spain) Carlos Costa (third round)
22. (France) Guy Forget (second round)
23. (Spain) Javier Sánchez (second round)
24. (Czech Republic) Petr Korda (second round)
25. (Netherlands) Paul Haarhuis (second round)
26. (Australia) Mark Woodforde (fourth round)
27. (United States) Aaron Krickstein (third round)
28. (Spain) Francisco Clavet (second round)
29. (France) Olivier Delaître (second round)
30. (Peru) Jaime Yzaga (quarterfinals)
31. (United States) Jared Palmer (third round)
32. (Australia) Richard Fromberg (second round)

== Draw ==
=== Key ===
- Q = Qualifier
- WC = Wild card
- LL = Lucky loser
- Alt = Alternate
- SE = Special exempt
- PR = Protected ranking
- ITF = ITF entry
- JE = Junior exempt
- w/o = Walkover
- r = Retired
- d = Defaulted
- SR = Special ranking

=== Finals ===
Quarterfinals
1	(United States) Pete Sampras	6	6^{5}	6
10	(Ukraine) Andriy Medvedev	1	7^{7}	4
WC	(Sweden) Mats Wilander	2	6	5
(Sweden) Jonas Björkman	6	1	7
12	(Sweden) Magnus Larsson	6	6
30	(Peru) Jaime Yzaga	0	3
8	(South Africa) Wayne Ferreira	2	4
2	(United States) Andre Agassi	6	6

Semifinals
1	(United States) Pete Sampras	4	6	6
(Sweden) Jonas Björkman	6	0	1
12	(Sweden) Magnus Larsson	5	6	6^{1}
2	(United States) Andre Agassi	7	4	7^{7}

Final
1	(United States) Pete Sampras	6	2	6^{3}
2	(United States) Andre Agassi	3	6	7^{7}

=== Top half ===
==== Section 1 ====
First round
(United Kingdom) M Petchey	4	6	2
(United States) D Rostagno	6	3	6
Q	(The Bahamas) M Knowles	7	2	6
(New Zealand) B Steven	5	6	4
(Brazil) F Meligeni	2	4
(United States) R Reneberg	6	6
(South Africa) M Ondruska	7^{7}	7^{8}
Q	(Germany) A Rădulescu	6^{5}	6^{6}

Second round
1	(United States) P Sampras	6	6
(United States) D Rostagno	3	2
Q	(The Bahamas) M Knowles	4	6	4
31	(United States) J Palmer	6	3	6
18	(Germany) B Karbacher	6	6
(United States) R Reneberg	3	3
(South Africa) M Ondruska	6^{2}	6	6
16	(Spain) Á Corretja	7^{7}	2	1

Third round
1	(United States) P Sampras	6	6
31	(United States) J Palmer	4	4
18	(Germany) B Karbacher	6	6
(South Africa) M Ondruska	3	0

Fourth round
1	(United States) P Sampras	6	6
18	(Germany) B Karbacher	3	4

==== Section 2 ====
First round
(Germany) M Zoecke	3	2
(France) L Roux	6	6
(Austria) H Skoff	3	6^{6}
(United States) P McEnroe	6	7^{8}
(Sweden) J Apell	6	7
WC	(United States) S Bryan	0	5
(France) J-P Fleurian	6	7
(Spain) E Sánchez	3	5

Second round
10	(Ukraine) A Medvedev	6	6^{1}	6
(France) L Roux	4	7^{7}	3
(United States) P McEnroe	6	7^{7}
23	(Spain) J Sánchez	3	6^{5}
26	(Australia) M Woodforde	0	6	6
(Sweden) J Apell	6	1	3
(France) J-P Fleurian	3	4
7	(United States) J Courier	6	6

Third round
10	(Ukraine) A Medvedev	6	7^{8}
(United States) P McEnroe	4	6^{6}
26	(Australia) M Woodforde	6	6
7	(United States) J Courier	3	4

Fourth round
10	(Ukraine) A Medvedev	6	5	7^{8}
26	(Australia) M Woodforde	3	7	6^{6}

==== Section 3 ====
First round
(Brazil) L Mattar	7^{7}	4	6^{5}
(United States) J Grabb	6^{3}	6	7^{7}
(Netherlands) J Siemerink	6	6
WC	(India) L Paes	4	4
WC	(Sweden) M Wilander	4	6	6
Q	(United States) L Gloria	6	3	3
(United States) J Stark	6	7^{10}
(Colombia) M Hadad	1	6^{8}

Second round
3	(United States) M Chang	6	6
(United States) J Grabb	0	3
(Netherlands) J Siemerink	6^{6}	6	6
29	(France) O Delaître	7^{8}	3	3
19	(Czech Republic) K Nováček	6	6^{1}	3
WC	(Sweden) M Wilander	2	7^{7}	6
(United States) J Stark	6	4	5
14	(Australia) P Rafter	1	6	7

Third round
3	(United States) M Chang	4	6	2
(Netherlands) J Siemerink	6	3	6
WC	(Sweden) M Wilander	6	6
14	(Australia) P Rafter	2	2

Fourth round
(Netherlands) J Siemerink	4	2
WC	(Sweden) M Wilander	6	6

==== Section 4 ====
First round
(Czech Republic) D Vacek	2	6	3
(Germany) K Braasch	6	3	6
(United States) J Tarango	7^{9}	6^{5}	6^{4}
(Australia) M Tebbutt	6^{7}	7^{7}	7^{7}
(Italy) G Pozzi	6^{1}	3
(Sweden) J Björkman	7^{7}	6
(United States) M Joyce	6	6
(France) A Boetsch	3	2

Second round
11	(Sweden) S Edberg	3	6^{1}
(Germany) K Braasch	6	7^{7}
(Australia) M Tebbutt	6^{5}	7^{7}	6
22	(France) G Forget	7^{7}	6^{2}	3
28	(Spain) F Clavet	3	7^{7}	2
(Sweden) J Björkman	6	6^{5}	6
(United States) M Joyce	6	6
5	(Germany) M Stich	3	2

Third round
(Germany) K Braasch	6	6
(Australia) M Tebbutt	4	4
(Sweden) J Björkman	6	6
(United States) M Joyce	3	2

Fourth round
(Germany) K Braasch	6	3	1
(Sweden) J Björkman	3	6	6

=== Bottom half ===
==== Section 5 ====
First round
Q	(United States) K Thorne	4	5
Q	(Australia) P Kilderry	6	7
(Germany) O Gross	6	5	6
Q	(Spain) S Casal	3	7	4
WC	(United States) S Humphries	6	4	5
(Sweden) H Holm	4	6	7
Q	(South Africa) N Godwin	6	4	3
Q	(Israel) E Ran	1	6	6

Second round
6	(Netherlands) R Krajicek	3	6	2
Q	(Australia) P Kilderry	6	3	6
(Germany) O Gross	3	2
27	(United States) A Krickstein	6	6
21	(Spain) C Costa	7^{7}	3	6
(Sweden) H Holm	6^{5}	6	2
Q	(Israel) E Ran	4	3
12	(Sweden) M Larsson	6	6

Third round
Q	(Australia) P Kilderry	6	6
27	(United States) A Krickstein	2	2
21	(Spain) C Costa	6	3	4
12	(Sweden) M Larsson	2	6	6

Fourth round
Q	(Australia) P Kilderry	3	6^{6}
12	(Sweden) M Larsson	6	7^{8}

==== Section 6 ====
First round
(Italy) D Nargiso	6	4	6^{5}
(Czech Republic) R Vašek	4	6	7^{7}
(Norway) C Ruud	5	4
(United States) A O'Brien	7	6
(United States) B Shelton	4	6	6
(Germany) H Dreekmann	6	2	4
(Italy) R Furlan	6	6
Q	(Venezuela) M Ruah	4	3

Second round
13	(Sweden) T Enqvist	6	3	6
(Czech Republic) R Vašek	3	6	0
(United States) A O'Brien	4	2
20	(United States) D Wheaton	6	6
30	(Peru) J Yzaga	6	7^{7}
(United States) B Shelton	2	6^{5}
(Italy) R Furlan	3	3
4	(Spain) A Berasategui	6	6

Third round
13	(Sweden) T Enqvist	7	6
20	(United States) D Wheaton	5	4
30	(Peru) J Yzaga	6	4	6
4	(Spain) A Berasategui	2	6	3

Fourth round
13	(Sweden) T Enqvist	2	6^{5}
30	(Peru) J Yzaga	6	7^{7}

==== Section 7 ====
First round
Q	(Argentina) D Orsanic	2	3
(Mexico) L Herrera	6	6
WC	(Australia) M Philippoussis	3	7^{7}	6
(Sweden) C Bergström	6	6^{3}	2
(Chile) M Ríos	6	3	7^{9}
(Sweden) L Jonsson	3	6	6^{7}
(Australia) T Woodbridge	7^{7}	7
(United States) B Gilbert	6^{5}	5

Second round
8	(South Africa) W Ferreira	6	6
(Mexico) L Herrera	4	2
WC	(Australia) M Philippoussis	7^{7}	6
25	(Netherlands) P Haarhuis	6^{4}	3
24	(Czech Republic) P Korda	3	6^{5}
(Chile) M Ríos	6	7^{7}
(Australia) T Woodbridge	6	7^{10}
9	(United States) T Martin	2	6^{8}

Third round
8	(South Africa) W Ferreira	6	7
WC	(Australia) M Philippoussis	4	5
(Chile) M Ríos	5	3
(Australia) T Woodbridge	7	6

Fourth round
8	(South Africa) W Ferreira	6^{8}	6	6
(Australia) T Woodbridge	7^{10}	4	2

==== Section 8 ====
First round
Q	(Ivory Coast) C N'Goran	4	2
(United States) M Washington	6	6
(United States) V Spadea	6	6
(Zimbabwe) B Black	1	3
Q	(United States) T Ho	6	6
(Russia) A Olhovskiy	2	3
(Japan) S Matsuoka	6	6
(Czech Republic) D Rikl	4	3

Second round
15	(Netherlands) J Eltingh	6^{3}	1
(United States) M Washington	7^{7}	6
(United States) V Spadea	7^{7}	6
17	(Australia) J Stoltenberg	6^{2}	3
32	(Australia) R Fromberg	6^{3}	3
Q	(United States) T Ho	7^{7}	6
(Japan) S Matsuoka	2	4
2	(United States) A Agassi	6	6

Third round
(United States) M Washington	7	7
(United States) V Spadea	5	5
Q	(United States) T Ho	0	2
2	(United States) A Agassi	6	6

Fourth round
(United States) M Washington	3	4
2	(United States) A Agassi	6	6

== See also ==
- Agassi–Sampras rivalry
