= Agassi–Sampras rivalry =

Tennis rivalry

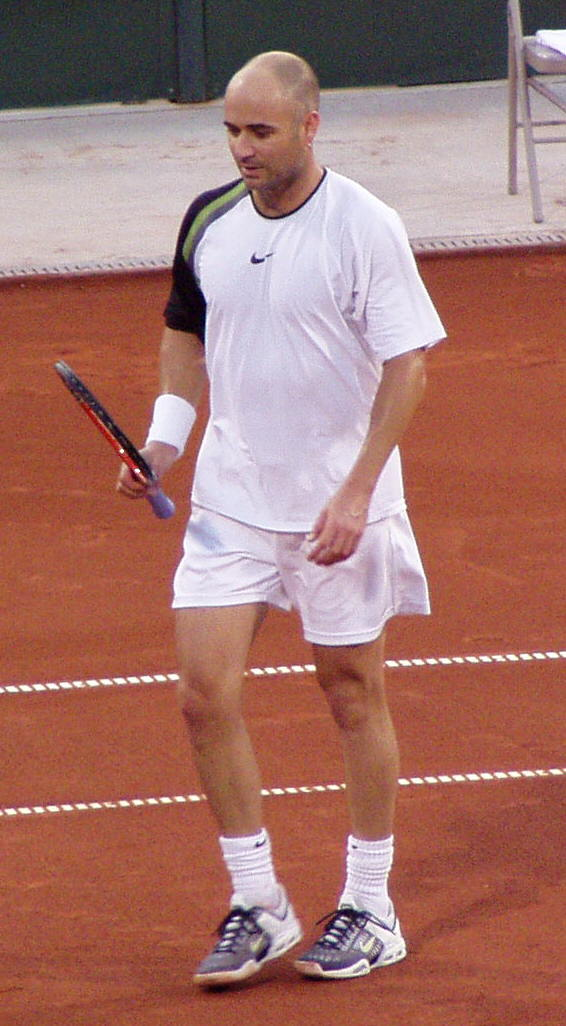
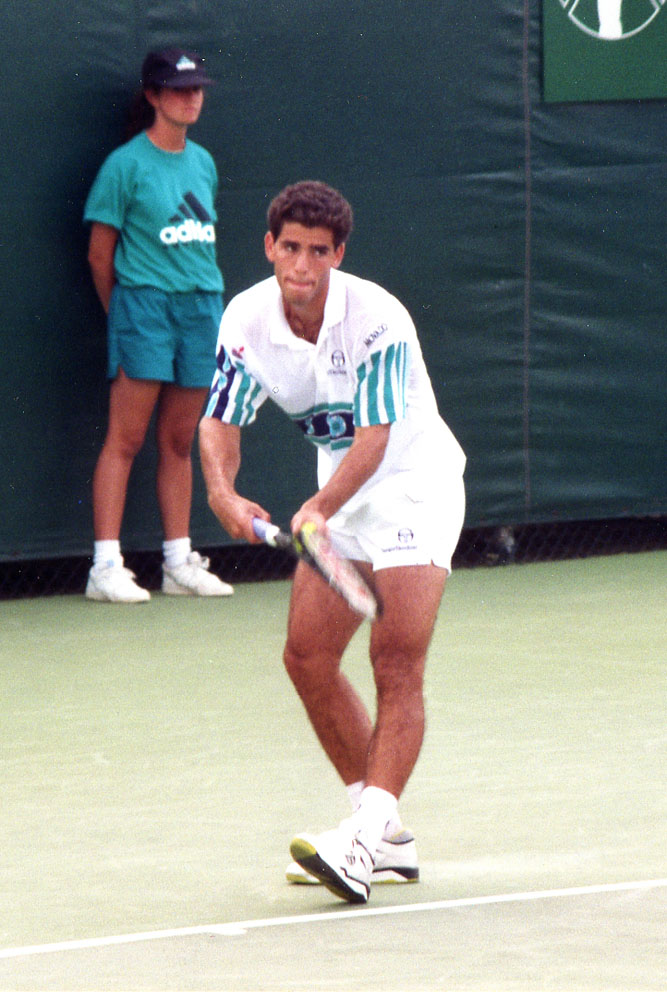
Andre Agassi and Pete Sampras

The Agassi–Sampras rivalry was a tennis rivalry between Andre Agassi and Pete Sampras, who were both ranked world No. 1 during the 1990s. Sampras held the world's top ranking for (a then-record) 286 weeks while Agassi held it for 101 weeks. With contrasting styles and temperaments, they played each other 34 times from 1989 through 2002, with Sampras leading the head-to-head 20–14 and leading 9–7 in finals. They are tied in their five-set matches at 1–1. It has been named as one of the greatest tennis rivalries of all time.

In Grand Slam tournaments, they played in five finals, with Sampras winning four. They met for the first time in a Grand Slam final at the 1990 US Open, with Agassi the favorite because of his superior ranking even though Sampras had defeated former world No. 1 players Ivan Lendl and John McEnroe en route to the final. Sampras defeated Agassi in straight sets.

In one of their matches, at the 2001 US Open quarter-final, Sampras won with the score of 6–7^{(7–9)}, 7–6^{(7–2)}, 7–6^{(7–2)}, 7–6^{(7–5)}; throughout the match, no player broke the other's serve. The last match in their rivalry came at the 2002 US Open final. It was their first meeting in the final since Sampras won in 1995. Sampras went on to win the match in four sets. This was Sampras's last career match, as he announced his retirement from the game a year later at the 2003 US Open. Agassi retired in 2006 after 20 years on the tour.

From their first ATP match to their 1995 US Open final match, their head-to-head was tied 8–8. From their 1995 US Open final match to 1999, their head-to-head was 9–3 in favor of Sampras. Agassi has often said that the 1995 US Open loss was a powerful blow to him that took him years to recover from; amid this and other psychological issues he subsequently plummeted to world No. 141, and it marked a significant shift in their rivalry. From 2000 to their last match in 2002, their head-to-head was tied at 3–3.

At the time of their retirements, Sampras held the all-time record for most men's major singles titles, with 14. This broke Björn Borg's record of 11 titles won in the Open Era, as well as the 12 by Roy Emerson from before the Open Era. On the other hand, Agassi, who claimed 8 Grand Slam titles, was ranked joint third for most titles in the Open Era, and joint fifth all-time at the time of his retirement. Agassi was the second man after Rod Laver to win the singles Career Grand Slam in the Open Era and one of then-five (currently eight) overall. As Agassi won the gold medal in men's singles at the 1996 Olympics, he was also the first male player to achieve a Career Golden Slam in singles tennis. The Career Grand Slam proved elusive for Sampras, as he was unable to find significant success on the serve-neutralizing clay courts, reaching only one French Open semi-final in his career.

Agassi also held the then-record for most ATP Masters Series (AMS) shields (since 1990) with 17. Also, Agassi has been called the best service returner in the history of the game.

== Head-to-head ==
Legend	Agassi	Sampras
Grand Slam	3	6
ATP Tour World Championships	2	4
ATP Masters Series	5	5
ATP World / International Series	4	5
Total	14	20

=== Singles (34) ===
Agassi 14 – Sampras 20

No.	Year	Tournament	Tier	Surface	Round	Winner	Score	Agassi	Sampras	Sets
1.	1989	Italian Open	Grand Prix	Clay	Last 32	Agassi	6–2, 6–1	1	0	2/3
2.	1990	US Pro Indoor	World	Carpet	Last 16	Sampras	5–7, 7–5, 0–0 RET	1	1	2/3
3.	1990	US Open	Grand Slam	Hard	Final	Sampras	6–4, 6–3, 6–2	1	2	3/5
4.	1990	ATP Tour World Championships	Tour Finals	Carpet	Round Robin	Agassi	6–4, 6–2	2	2	2/3
5.	1991	ATP Tour World Championships	Tour Finals	Carpet	Round Robin	Sampras	6–3, 1–6, 6–3	2	3	3/3
6.	1992	AT&T Challenge	World	Clay	Final	Agassi	7–5, 6–4	3	3	2/3
7.	1992	French Open	Grand Slam	Clay	Quarterfinals	Agassi	7–6^{(8–6)}, 6–2, 6–1	4	3	3/5
8.	1993	Wimbledon	Grand Slam	Grass	Quarterfinals	Sampras	6–2, 6–2, 3–6, 3–6, 6–4	4	4	5/5
9.	1994	Miami Open	Masters	Hard	Final	Sampras	5–7, 6–3, 6–3	4	5	3/3
10.	1994	ATP Osaka	World	Hard	Semifinals	Sampras	6–3, 6–1	4	6	2/3
11.	1994	Paris Open	Masters	Carpet	Quarterfinals	Agassi	7–6^{(8–6)}, 7–5	5	6	2/3
12.	1994	ATP Tour World Championships	Tour Finals	Carpet	Semifinals	Sampras	4–6, 7–6^{(7–5)}, 6–3	5	7	3/3
13.	1995	Australian Open	Grand Slam	Hard	Final	Agassi	4–6, 6–1, 7–6^{(8–6)}, 6–4	6	7	4/5
14.	1995	Indian Wells Masters	Masters	Hard	Final	Sampras	7–5, 6–3, 7–5	6	8	3/5
15.	1995	Miami Open	Masters	Hard	Final	Agassi	3–6, 6–2, 7–6^{(7–3)}	7	8	3/3
16.	1995	Canadian Open	Masters	Hard	Final	Agassi	3–6, 6–2, 6–3	8	8	3/3
17.	1995	US Open	Grand Slam	Hard	Final	Sampras	6–4, 6–3, 4–6, 7–5	8	9	4/5
18.	1996	Pacific Coast Championships	World	Hard (i)	Final	Sampras	6–2, 6–3	8	10	2/3
19.	1996	Stuttgart Masters	Masters	Carpet	Quarterfinals	Sampras	6–4, 6–1	8	11	2/3
20.	1996	ATP Tour World Championships	Tour Finals	Carpet	Round Robin	Sampras	6–2, 6–1	8	12	2/3
21.	1998	Pacific Coast Championships	World	Hard (i)	Final	Agassi	6–2, 6–4	9	12	2/3
22.	1998	Monte Carlo Open	Masters	Clay	Last 32	Sampras	6–4, 7–5	9	13	2/3
23.	1998	Canadian Open	Masters	Hard	Quarterfinals	Agassi	6–7^{(5–7)}, 6–1, 6–2	10	13	3/3
24.	1999	Wimbledon	Grand Slam	Grass	Final	Sampras	6–3, 6–4, 7–5	10	14	3/5
25.	1999	Los Angeles Open	World	Hard	Final	Sampras	7–6^{(7–3)}, 7–6^{(7–1)}	10	15	2/3
26.	1999	Cincinnati Open	Masters	Hard	Semifinals	Sampras	7–6^{(9–7)}, 6–4	10	16	2/3
27.	1999	ATP Tour World Championships	Tour Finals	Hard (i)	Round Robin	Agassi	6–2, 6–2	11	16	2/3
28.	1999	ATP Tour World Championships	Tour Finals	Hard (i)	Final	Sampras	6–1, 7–5, 6–4	11	17	3/5
29.	2000	Australian Open	Grand Slam	Hard	Semifinals	Agassi	6–4, 3–6, 6–7^{(0–7)}, 7–6^{(7–5)}, 6–1	12	17	5/5
30.	2001	Indian Wells Masters	Masters	Hard	Final	Agassi	7–6^{(7–5)}, 7–5, 6–1	13	17	3/5
31.	2001	Los Angeles Open	International	Hard	Final	Agassi	6–4, 6–2	14	17	2/3
32.	2001	US Open	Grand Slam	Hard	Quarterfinals	Sampras	6–7^{(7–9)}, 7–6^{(7–2)}, 7–6^{(7–2)}, 7–6^{(7–5)}	14	18	4/5
33.	2002	US Clay Court Championships	International	Clay	Semifinals	Sampras	6–1, 7–5	14	19	2/3
34.	2002	US Open	Grand Slam	Hard	Final	Sampras	6–3, 6–4, 5–7, 6–4	14	20	4/5

== Breakdown of their rivalry ==
- All matches: (34) Sampras 20–14
- All finals: Sampras 9–7
  - Hard courts: Sampras 11–9
  - Grass courts: Sampras 2–0
  - Clay courts: Agassi 3–2
  - Carpet courts: Sampras 5–2
  - Masters Series matches: Tied 5–5
  - Masters Series finals: Agassi 3–2
  - Grand Slam matches: Sampras 6–3
  - Grand Slam finals: Sampras 4–1
  - Year-end championships matches: Sampras 4–2
  - Year-end championships finals: Sampras 1–0

== Performance timeline comparison ==
=== Grand Slam tournaments ===
Key
**W**	F	SF	QF	#R	RR	Q#	DNQ	A	NH

(W) winner; (F) finalist; (SF) semifinalist; (QF) quarterfinalist; (#R) rounds 4, 3, 2, 1; (RR) round-robin stage; (Q#) qualification round; (DNQ) did not qualify; (A) absent; (NH) not held; (SR) strike rate (events won / competed); (W–L) win–loss record.
- **Bold** = players met during this tournament

==== 1986–1991 ====
Player	1986				1987				1988				1989				1990				1991			
Player	AUS	FRA	WIM	USA	AUS	FRA	WIM	USA	AUS	FRA	WIM	USA	AUS	FRA	WIM	USA	AUS	FRA	WIM	USA	AUS	FRA	WIM	USA
(United States) **Andre Agassi**	NH	A	A	1R	A	2R	1R	1R	A	SF	A	SF	A	3R	A	SF	A	F	A	**F**	A	F	QF	1R
(United States) **Pete Sampras**	NH	A	A	A	A	A	A	A	A	A	A	1R	1R	2R	1R	4R	4R	A	1R	**W**	A	2R	2R	QF

==== 1992–1997 ====
Player	1992				1993				1994				1995				1996				1997			
Player	AUS	FRA	WIM	USA	AUS	FRA	WIM	USA	AUS	FRA	WIM	USA	AUS	FRA	WIM	USA	AUS	FRA	WIM	USA	AUS	FRA	WIM	USA
(United States) **Andre Agassi**	A	**SF**	W	QF	A	A	**QF**	1R	A	2R	4R	W	**W**	QF	SF	**F**	SF	2R	1R	SF	A	A	A	4R
(United States) **Pete Sampras**	A	**QF**	SF	F	SF	QF	**W**	W	W	QF	W	4R	**F**	1R	W	**W**	3R	SF	QF	W	W	3R	W	4R

==== 1998–2002 ====
Player	1998				1999				2000				2001				2002			
Player	AUS	FRA	WIM	USA	AUS	FRA	WIM	USA	AUS	FRA	WIM	USA	AUS	FRA	WIM	USA	AUS	FRA	WIM	USA
(United States) **Andre Agassi**	4R	1R	2R	4R	4R	W	**F**	W	**W**	2R	SF	2R	W	QF	SF	**QF**	A	QF	2R	**F**
(United States) **Pete Sampras**	QF	2R	W	SF	A	2R	**W**	A	**SF**	1R	W	F	4R	2R	4R	**F**	4R	1R	2R	**W**

=== ATP rankings ===
==== Year-end ranking timeline ====
Player	1986	1987	1988	1989	1990	1991	1992	1993	1994	1995	1996	1997	1998	1999	2000	2001	2002	2003	2004	2005	2006
(United States) Andre Agassi	91	25	**3**	7	4	10	9	24	**2**	**2**	8	110	6	**1**	6	**3**	**2**	4	8	7	150
(United States) Pete Sampras			97	81	5	6	**3**	**1**	**1**	**1**	**1**	**1**	**1**	**3**	**3**	10	13				

== Career evolution ==
Agassi and Sampras were born fifteen and a half months apart. Agassi's birthday is April 29, 1970, while Sampras's is August 12, 1971. A different viewpoint of their career evolution is offered by taking the season they ended with an age of 16 as starting point, and comparing their accomplishments at the same age. For instance in 1996, Agassi finished the season being 26 years old and holding 3 Grand Slam titles.

Age at end of season		16	17	18	19	20	21	22	23	24	25	26	27	28	29	30	31	32	33	34	35	36
(United States) Agassi's season		1986	1987	1988	1989	1990	1991	1992	1993	1994	1995	1996	1997	1998	1999	2000	2001	2002	2003	2004	2005	2006
(United States) Sampras's season		1987	1988	1989	1990	1991	1992	1993	1994	1995	1996	1997	1998	1999	2000	2001	2002	2003	2004	2005	2006	2007
Grand Slam titles	Agassi	0	0	0	0	0	0	1	1	2	3	3	3	3	5	6	7	7	8	8	8	8
Grand Slam titles	Sampras	0	0	0	1	1	1	3	5	7	8	10	11	12	13	13	14	14	14	14	14	14
Grand Slam match wins	Agassi	0	1	11	18	30	40	56	60	71	93	104	107	114	137	151	171	182	201	210	220	224
Grand Slam match wins	Sampras	0	0	4	14	20	35	58	79	99	117	136	153	161	179	192	203	203	203	203	203	203
Year-end championships	Agassi	0	0	0	0	1	1	1	1	1	1	1	1	1	1	1	1	1	1	1	1	1
Year-end championships	Sampras	0	0	0	0	1	1	1	2	2	3	4	4	5	5	5	5	5	5	5	5	5
Masters Series Titles	Agassi	0	0	0	0	1	1	2	2	4	7	9	9	9	10	10	12	15	16	17	17	17
Masters Series Titles	Sampras	0	0	0	0	0	1	2	5	7	7	9	9	10	11	11	11	11	11	11	11	11
Total titles	Agassi	0	1	7	8	12	14	17	19	24	31	34	34	39	44	45	49	54	58	59	60	60
Total titles	Sampras	0	0	0	4	8	13	21	31	36	44	52	56	61	63	63	64	64	64	64	64	64
Total match wins	Agassi	5	31	94	135	180	219	261	294	346	419	457	469	537	600	640	685	738	785	822	860	870
Total match wins	Sampras	0	10	28	79	131	203	288	365	437	502	557	618	658	700	735	762	762	762	762	762	762
Ranking	Agassi	91	25	3	7	4	10	9	24	2	2	8	110	6	1	6	3	2	4	8	7	150
Ranking	Sampras	–	97	81	5	6	3	1	1	1	1	1	1	3	3	10	13	–	–	–	–	–
Weeks at number 1	Agassi	0	0	0	0	0	0	0	0	0	30	32	32	32	51	87	87	87	101	101	101	101
Weeks at number 1	Sampras	0	0	0	0	0	0	35	87	109	154	206	252	276	286	286	286	286	286	286	286	286

=== Combined singles performance timeline (best result) ===
Tournament	1986	1987	1988	1989	1990	1991	1992	1993	1994	1995	1996	1997	1998	1999	2000	2001	2002	2003	2004	2005	2006	SR
Grand Slam tournaments
Australian Open	NH	A	A	1R	4R	A	A	SF	W	W	SF	W	QF	4R	W	W	4R	W	SF	QF	A	6 / 15
French Open	A	2R	SF	3R	F	F	SF	QF	QF	QF	SF	3R	2R	W	2R	QF	QF	QF	1R	1R	A	1 / 19
Wimbledon	A	1R	A	1R	1R	QF	W	W	W	W	QF	W	W	W	W	SF	2R	4R	A	A	3R	8 / 17
US Open	1R	1R	SF	SF	W	QF	F	W	W	W	W	4R	SF	W	F	F	W	SF	QF	F	3R	7 / 21

== See also ==
- List of tennis rivalries
