= 2001 Mercedes-Benz Cup – Singles =

Singles
- 2001 Mercedes-Benz Cup

Final
- Champion: (United States) Andre Agassi
- Runner-up: (United States) Pete Sampras
- Score: 6–4, 6–2

Details
- Draw: 32 (4 Q / 3 WC )
- Seeds: 8

Events
Singles	Doubles
- Los Angeles Open

Michael Chang was the defending champion, but lost in the second round to Pete Sampras.

Andre Agassi won in the final 6–4, 6–2 against Sampras.

== Seeds ==
1. (Brazil) Gustavo Kuerten (semifinals)
2. (Russia) Marat Safin (second round)
3. (United States) Andre Agassi (champion)
4. (United States) Pete Sampras (final)
5. (United States) Jan-Michael Gambill (quarterfinals)
6. (Spain) Carlos Moyá (first round)
7. (Sweden) Magnus Norman (quarterfinals)
8. (Germany) Tommy Haas (quarterfinals)

== Draw ==
Key

- Q = Qualifier
- WC = Wild card
- LL = Lucky loser
- Alt = Alternate
- ITF = ITF entry
- PR = Protected ranking
- SR = Special ranking
- SE = Special exempt
- JE = Junior exempt
- JR = Junior Accelerator Programme entrant
- CO = College Accelerator Programme entrant
- NG = Next Gen Accelerator Program entrant
- w/o = Walkover
- r = Retired
- d = Defaulted

=== Finals ===
Semifinals
1	(Brazil) Gustavo Kuerten	7^{7}	3	3
3	(United States) Andre Agassi	6^{3}	6	6
4	(United States) Pete Sampras	7^{7}	6
(Belgium) Xavier Malisse	6^{4}	4

Final
3	(United States) Andre Agassi	6	6
4	(United States) Pete Sampras	4	2

=== Top half ===
First round
1	(Brazil) G Kuerten	7^{7}	6
(France) M Llodra	6^{4}	4
Q	(United States) R Ginepri	4	6	6
(Canada) S Lareau	6	3	4
(France) A Dupuis	7^{7}	6^{3}	2
(United States) B Bryan	6^{3}	7^{7}	6
(South Korea) H-T Lee	4	4
8	(Germany) T Haas	6	6
3	(United States) A Agassi	6	7^{7}
WC	(United States) J Blake	0	6^{3}
(United Kingdom) G Rusedski	6	7^{7}
(Thailand) P Srichaphan	4	6^{4}
WC	(United States) A Kim	4	3
(United States) P Goldstein	6	6
Q	(United States) M Joyce	1	3
5	(United States) J-M Gambill	6	6

Second round
1	(Brazil) G Kuerten	7^{7}	6
Q	(United States) R Ginepri	6^{4}	2
(United States) B Bryan	2	3
8	(Germany) T Haas	6	6
3	(United States) A Agassi	6	4	6
(United Kingdom) G Rusedski	3	6	4
(United States) P Goldstein	1	4
5	(United States) J-M Gambill	6	6

Quarterfinals
1	(Brazil) G Kuerten	6	6
8	(Germany) T Haas	3	3
3	(United States) A Agassi	6	7
5	(United States) J-M Gambill	2	5

Semifinals
1	(Brazil) G Kuerten	7^{7}	3	3
3	(United States) A Agassi	6^{3}	6	6

=== Bottom half ===
First round
7	(Sweden) M Norman	6	6
(United States) C Mamiit	4	2
Q	(Italy) C Caratti	4	3
(France) C Saulnier	6	6
(United States) M Chang	6	7
Q	(Israel) N Behr	2	5
(United States) C Woodruff	5	2
4	(United States) P Sampras	7	6
6	(Spain) C Moyá	3	4
WC	(United States) T Dent	6	6
(Netherlands) S Schalken	3	6^{3}
(Belarus) M Mirnyi	6	7^{7}
(United States) J Gimelstob	4	5
(Belgium) X Malisse	6	7
(United States) A Roddick	3	4
2	(Russia) M Safin	6	6

Second round
7	(Sweden) M Norman	6	7^{7}
(France) C Saulnier	4	6^{4}
(United States) M Chang	6^{6}	6^{2}
4	(United States) P Sampras	7^{8}	7^{7}
WC	(United States) T Dent	6^{4}	6	7
(Belarus) M Mirnyi	7^{7}	2	5
(Belgium) X Malisse	7	6
2	(Russia) M Safin	5	3

Quarterfinals
7	(Sweden) M Norman	5	6^{4}
4	(United States) P Sampras	7	7^{7}
WC	(United States) T Dent	6	5	3
(Belgium) X Malisse	3	7	6

Semifinals
4	(United States) P Sampras	7^{7}	6
(Belgium) X Malisse	6^{4}	4
