= 1981 Jack Kramer Open =

- Date: April 13–20
- Edition: 55th
- Category: Grand Prix
- Draw: 32S / 16D
- Prize money: $75,000
- Surface: Hard / outdoor
- Location: Los Angeles, California, U.S.
- Venue: Los Angeles Tennis Club

Champions

Singles
- (United States) John McEnroe

Doubles
- (United States) Tom Gullikson / (United States) Butch Walts
- Pacific Southwest Open

The 1981 Jack Kramer Open, also known as the Pacific Southwest Open, was a men's tennis tournament played on outdoor hard courts at the Los Angeles Tennis Club in Los Angeles, California in the United States. The event was part of the Grand Prix tennis circuit. It was the 55th edition of the Pacific Southwest tournament and was held from April 13 through April 20, 1981. First-seeded John McEnroe won the singles title and the corresponding $15,000 first-prize money. The finals were delayed to Monday, April 20 due to rain.

== Finals ==
=== Singles ===
(United States) John McEnroe defeated (United States) Sandy Mayer 6–7, 6–3, 6–3

- It was McEnroe's 4th singles title of the year and the 28th of his career.

=== Doubles ===
(United States) Tom Gullikson / (United States) Butch Walts defeated (United States) John McEnroe / (United States) Ferdi Taygan 6–4, 6–4
