= 1979 Jack Kramer Open =

1979 Pacific Southwest Open
- Date: September 17–23
- Edition: 53rd
- Category: Grand Prix
- Draw: 64S / 32D
- Prize money: $175,000
- Surface: Carpet / indoor
- Location: Los Angeles, US
- Venue: Pauley Pavilion

Champions

Singles
- (United States) Peter Fleming

Doubles
- (United States) Marty Riessen / (United States) Sherwood Stewart
- Pacific Southwest Open

The 1979 Jack Kramer Open, also known as the Pacific Southwest Open, was a men's tennis tournament played on indoor carpet courts at the Pauley Pavilion in Los Angeles, California in the United States. The event was part of the Grand Prix tennis circuit. It was the 53rd edition of the Pacific Southwest tournament and was held from September 17 through September 23, 1979.

Tournament director Jack Kramer underwrote the tournament after ARCO ended their sponsorship of the event. Eight-seeded Peter Fleming won the singles title after defeating his doubles partner and first-seed John McEnroe in the final and earned $28,000 first-prize money.

== Finals ==
=== Singles ===
(United States) Peter Fleming defeated (United States) John McEnroe 6–4, 6–4

- It was Fleming's 2nd singles title of the year and the 3rd of his career.

=== Doubles ===
(United States) Marty Riessen / (United States) Sherwood Stewart defeated (Poland) Wojciech Fibak / (South Africa) Frew McMillan 6–4, 6–4
