= Paul Kilderry =

Australian tennis player

- Country (sports): Australia
- Residence: Orlando, Florida, U.S.
- Born: 11 April 1973 (age 53) Perth, Western Australia, Australia
- Height: 5 ft 9 in (175 cm)
- Plays: Right-handed
- Prize money: $551,195

Singles
- Career record: 8–21
- Career titles: 0; 1 Challenger, 0 Futures
- Highest ranking: No. 138 (17 April 1995)

Grand Slam singles results
- Australian Open: 1R (1994, 1995, 1996)
- French Open: Q1 (1993, 1994, 1995)
- Wimbledon: 2R (1993)
- US Open: 1R (1994)

Doubles
- Career record: 77–103
- Career titles: 3; 8 Challenger, 1 Futures
- Highest ranking: No. 67 (22 July 1996)

Grand Slam doubles results
- Australian Open: 3R (1994)
- French Open: 3R (1994)
- Wimbledon: 2R (1995, 2000, 2001)
- US Open: 2R (1995, 1997)

Grand Slam mixed doubles results
- Australian Open: 1R (2000)
- French Open: 3R (1996, 1998)
- Wimbledon: 2R (1998, 2000)
- US Open: QF (1996)
- Last updated on: 6 December 2021.

Paul Kilderry (born 11 April 1973) is a former professional tennis player from Australia.

Kilderry enjoyed most of his tennis success while playing doubles. During his career he won 3 doubles titles. He achieved a career-high doubles ranking of World No. 67 in 1996.

Paul Kilderry was appointed as the Hopman Cup tournament director in 2013.

== Junior Grand Slam finals ==
=== Doubles: 1 (1 runner-up) ===
Result	Year	Championship	Surface	Partner	Opponents	Score
Loss	1991	Australian Open	Hard	(Australia) James Holmes	(Australia) Grant Doyle (Australia) Joshua Eagle	6–7, 4–6

== ATP career finals ==
=== Doubles: 5 (3 titles, 2 runner-ups) ===
Legend Grand Slam Tournaments (0–0) ATP World Tour Finals (0–0) ATP Masters Series (0–0) ATP Championship Series (0–0) ATP World Series (3–2)	Finals by surface Hard (1–0) Clay (1–0) Grass (1–2) Carpet (0–0)	Finals by setting Outdoors (3–2) Indoors (0–0)

Result	W–L	Date	Tournament	Tier	Surface	Partner	Opponents	Score
Loss	0–1	Jul 1995	Newport, United States	World Series	Grass	(Portugal) Nuno Marques	(Germany) Markus Zoecke (Germany) Jörn Renzenbrink	1–6, 2–6
Win	1–1	Jun 1996	Rosmalen, Netherlands	World Series	Grass	(Czech Republic) Pavel Vízner	(Sweden) Anders Järryd (Canada) Daniel Nestor	7–5, 6–3
Loss	1–2	Jul 1996	Newport, United States	World Series	Grass	(Australia) Michael Tebbutt	(South Africa) Marius Barnard (South Africa) Piet Norval	7–6, 4–6, 4–6
Win	2–2	Aug 1997	Amsterdam, Netherlands	World Series	Clay	(Ecuador) Nicolás Lapentti	(Australia) Andrew Kratzmann (Czech Republic) Libor Pimek	3–6, 7–5, 7–6
Win	3–2	Jul 2000	Los Angeles, United States	World Series	Hard	(Australia) Sandon Stolle	(United States) Jan-Michael Gambill (United States) Scott Humphries	walkover

== ATP Challenger and ITF Futures finals ==
=== Singles: 2 (1–1) ===
Legend ATP Challenger (1–0) ITF Futures (0–1)	Finals by surface Hard (1–0) Clay (0–1) Grass (0–0) Carpet (0–0)

Result	W–L	Date	Tournament	Tier	Surface	Opponent	Score
Loss	0–1	Nov 1999	Australia F2, Frankston	Futures	Clay	(Australia) Dejan Petrovic	2–6, 3–6
Win	1–1	Dec 1999	Perth, Australia	Challenger	Hard	(Australia) Dejan Petrovic	6–4, 6–4

=== Doubles: 15 (9–6) ===
Legend ATP Challenger (8–5) ITF Futures (1–1)	Finals by surface Hard (5–2) Clay (3–3) Grass (1–1) Carpet (0–0)

Result	W–L	Date	Tournament	Tier	Surface	Partner	Opponents	Score
Loss	0–1	Aug 1993	Liege, Belgium	Challenger	Clay	(Sweden) Jan Apell	(South Africa) Brendan Curry (South Africa) Kirk Haygarth	3–6, 6–4, 4–6
Win	1–1	Dec 1993	Perth, Australia	Challenger	Grass	(Australia) Brent Larkham	(Australia) Ben Ellwood (Australia) Mark Philippoussis	7–6, 6–3
Loss	1–2	Apr 1994	Puerto Vallarta, Mexico	Challenger	Hard	(Australia) Simon Youl	(Argentina) Pablo Albano (Venezuela) Nicolas Pereira	4–6, 6–3, 6–7
Win	2–2	Aug 1994	Cincinnati, United States	Challenger	Hard	(Australia) Grant Doyle	(Canada) Brian Gyetko (South Africa) Kevin Ullyett	6–3, 6–4
Win	3–2	Dec 1997	Perth, Australia	Challenger	Hard	(Australia) James Holmes	(Australia) Lleyton Hewitt (Australia) Luke Smith	6–1, 3–6, 7–6
Win	4–2	Dec 1998	Perth, Australia	Challenger	Hard	(Australia) Lleyton Hewitt	(Australia) Dejan Petrovic (Australia) Grant Silcock	6–7, 6–3, 7–6
Loss	4–3	Apr 1999	Paget, Bermuda	Challenger	Clay	(Australia) Patrick Rafter	(United States) Doug Flach (United States) Richey Reneberg	4–6, 4–6
Win	5–3	Oct 1999	Dallas, United States	Challenger	Hard	(Australia) Grant Silcock	(United States) Mitch Sprengelmeyer (South Africa) Jason Weir-Smith	4–6, 6–3, 6–1
Win	6–3	Nov 1999	Australia F2, Frankston	Futures	Clay	(Australia) Grant Silcock	(Australia) Chris Rae (Australia) Sebastien Swierk	6–4, 6–7, 6–3
Loss	6–4	Nov 1999	Australia F3, Berri	Futures	Grass	(Australia) Grant Silcock	(Australia) Chris Rae (Australia) Sebastien Swierk	3–6, 7–6, 6–7
Win	7–4	Dec 1999	Perth, Australia	Challenger	Hard	(Australia) Grant Silcock	(Australia) Paul Baccanello (Australia) Josh Tuckfield	6–4, 7–6
Win	8–4	May 2000	Birmingham, United States	Challenger	Clay	(Australia) Peter Tramacchi	(Australia) Lee Pearson (Australia) Grant Silcock	6–4, 6–4
Win	9–4	May 2000	Armonk, United States	Challenger	Clay	(Australia) Peter Tramacchi	(United States) Bob Bryan (United States) Mike Bryan	2–6, 7–6^{(7–5)}, 6–4
Loss	9–5	May 2001	Rocky Mount, United States	Challenger	Clay	(Australia) Peter Tramacchi	(United States) Mitch Sprengelmeyer (The Bahamas) Mark Merklein	5–7, 6–7^{(7–9)}
Loss	9–6	Aug 2001	Lexington, United States	Challenger	Hard	(United States) Jack Waite	(South Africa) John-Laffnie De Jager (South Africa) Robbie Koenig	6–7^{(1–7)}, 5–7

== Performance timelines ==
Key
W	F	SF	QF	#R	RR	Q#	DNQ	A	NH

(W) winner; (F) finalist; (SF) semifinalist; (QF) quarterfinalist; (#R) rounds 4, 3, 2, 1; (RR) round-robin stage; (Q#) qualification round; (DNQ) did not qualify; (A) absent; (NH) not held; (SR) strike rate (events won / competed); (W–L) win–loss record.

=== Singles ===
Tournament	1990	1991	1992	1993	1994	1995	1996	1997	1998	1999	2000	SR	W–L	Win %
Grand Slam tournaments
Australian Open	Q1	Q2	A	Q2	1R	1R	1R	A	Q1	A	Q2	0 / 3	0–3	0%
French Open	A	A	A	Q1	Q1	Q1	A	A	A	A	A	0 / 0	0–0	–
Wimbledon	A	A	A	2R	Q1	Q2	Q2	A	A	A	1R	0 / 2	1–2	33%
US Open	A	A	A	Q3	1R	Q2	Q1	A	A	A	Q1	0 / 1	0–1	0%
Win–loss	0–0	0–0	0–0	1–1	0–2	0–1	0–1	0–0	0–0	0–0	0–1	0 / 6	1–6	14%
ATP Masters Series
Indian Wells	A	A	A	A	A	A	Q2	A	A	A	A	0 / 0	0–0	–
Miami	A	A	A	A	Q3	4R	Q1	A	A	A	A	0 / 1	3–1	75%
Canada	A	A	A	A	A	Q3	A	A	A	A	A	0 / 0	0–0	–
Cincinnati	A	A	A	A	A	A	A	A	A	A	Q1	0 / 0	0–0	–
Paris	A	A	A	A	Q3	A	A	A	A	A	A	0 / 0	0–0	–
Win–loss	0–0	0–0	0–0	0–0	0–0	3–1	0–0	0–0	0–0	0–0	0–0	0 / 1	3–1	75%

=== Doubles ===
Tournament	1993	1994	1995	1996	1997	1998	1999	2000	2001	SR	W–L	Win %
Grand Slam tournaments
Australian Open	2R	3R	1R	1R	A	2R	1R	2R	1R	0 / 8	5–8	38%
French Open	A	3R	A	1R	1R	2R	A	2R	1R	0 / 6	4–6	40%
Wimbledon	Q1	1R	2R	1R	1R	1R	A	2R	2R	0 / 7	3–7	30%
US Open	A	1R	2R	1R	2R	A	A	1R	Q1	0 / 5	2–5	29%
Win–loss	1–1	4–4	2–3	0–4	1–3	2–3	0–1	3–4	1–3	0 / 26	14–26	35%
ATP Masters Series
Indian Wells	A	A	A	QF	Q1	A	Q1	A	A	0 / 1	2–1	67%
Miami	A	Q1	1R	2R	QF	1R	1R	A	A	0 / 5	4–5	44%
Hamburg	A	A	A	A	1R	A	A	A	A	0 / 1	0–1	0%
Rome	A	A	A	A	1R	A	A	A	A	0 / 1	0–1	0%
Canada	A	A	QF	A	A	A	A	2R	A	0 / 2	3–2	60%
Cincinnati	A	A	A	1R	A	A	A	Q1	A	0 / 1	0–1	0%
Win–loss	0–0	0–0	2–2	3–3	3–3	0–1	0–1	1–1	0–0	0 / 11	9–11	45%

=== Mixed doubles ===
Tournament	1994	1995	1996	1997	1998	1999	2000	SR	W–L	Win %
Grand Slam tournaments
Australian Open	A	A	A	A	A	A	1R	0 / 1	0–1	0%
French Open	A	A	3R	1R	3R	A	A	0 / 3	4–3	57%
Wimbledon	1R	1R	1R	1R	2R	A	2R	0 / 6	2–6	25%
US Open	A	A	QF	A	A	A	A	0 / 1	2–1	67%
Win–loss	0–1	0–1	4–3	0–2	3–2	0–0	1–2	0 / 11	8–11	42%
