= Los Angeles Tennis Center =

University of California, Los Angeles sports facility

Coordinates: 34.069902°N 118.4483°W

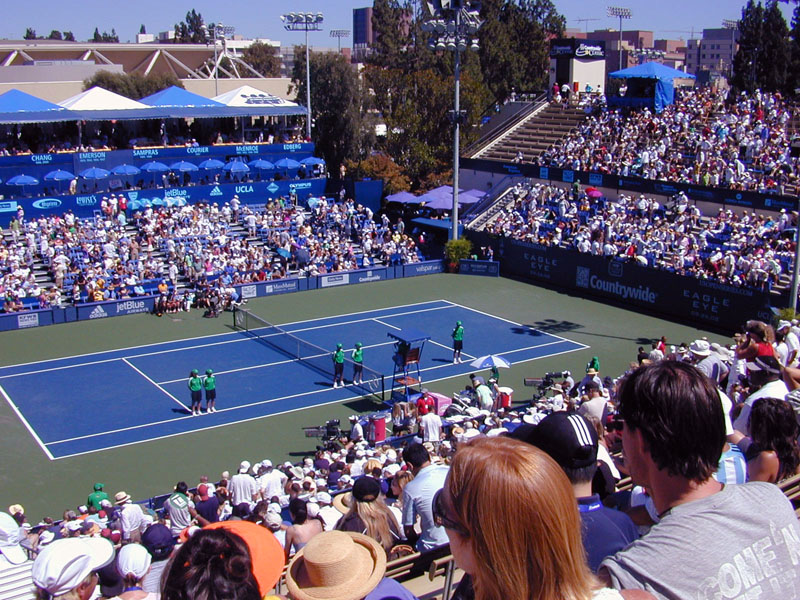
- Interactive map of Los Angeles Tennis Center
- Location: Los Angeles, California; United States
- Capacity: 5,800 (tennis)
- Surface: Hard, outdoor

Construction
- Opened: May 20, 1984

Tenants
- Los Angeles Open (250 series) (1984-2012); UCLA Men's and Women's Tennis teams 1984 Summer Olympics (Tennis)

The Los Angeles Tennis Center is a tennis facility located on the campus of the University of California, Los Angeles in Westwood, Los Angeles, California. The center opened May 20, 1984, and hosted the demonstration tennis event of the 1984 Summer Olympics. The UCLA Bruins tennis teams moved to the facility in 1985 (men) and 1997 (women). The NCAA Women's Tennis Championships were held at the LATC in 1984, 1987, and 1988, and the Men's Championships took place there in 1997.

The center hosted the Los Angeles Open, an ATP World Tour 250 event. The main grandstand surrounds three courts, and has a capacity of 5800 spectators.

The Center hosted for many years the annual "Spring Sing", UCLA's student talent show and the presentation of the George and Ira Gershwin Award. Winners included Angela Lansbury (1988), Ella Fitzgerald (1989), Ray Charles (1991), Debbie Allen (1992), Mel Torme (1994), Bernadette Peters (1995), Frank Sinatra (2000), Stevie Wonder (2002), k.d. lang (2003), James Taylor (2004), Burt Bacharach (2006), Quincy Jones (2007), Lionel Richie (2008), Julie Andrews (2009) and Brian Wilson (2011).

For many years, graduation ceremonies and celebrations were also held at the Los Angeles Tennis Center.

The Center hosted the 1997 Beach Volleyball World Championships, MTV Rock N' Jock, and the 2011 Coldplay concert. Presidential candidate Ron Paul spoke at the center before a large crowd on April 4, 2012. The 2015 JazzReggae Festival @ UCLA was held at the Tennis Center on April 25, 2015.

The Southern California Tennis Association (SCTA) has offices at the Los Angeles Tennis Center.

== Gallery ==
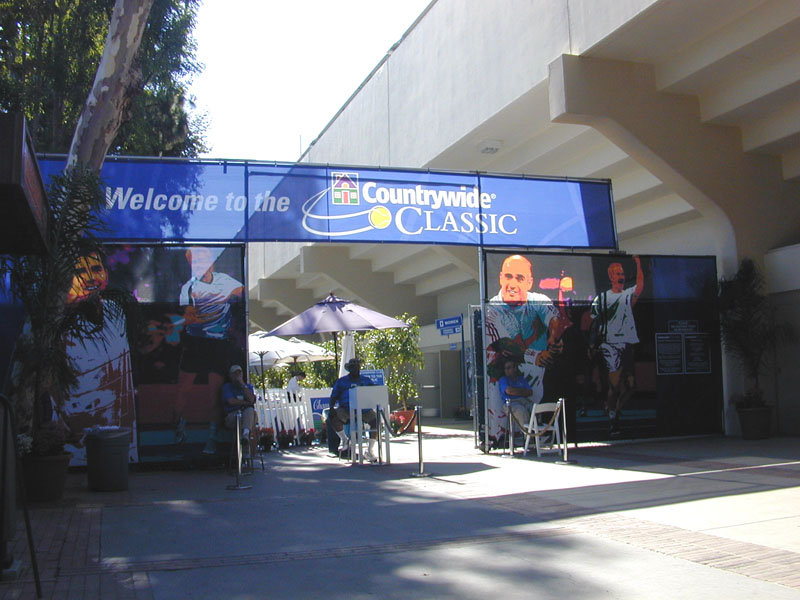
Main Entrance to the Countrywide Classic at UCLA's L.A. Tennis Center.

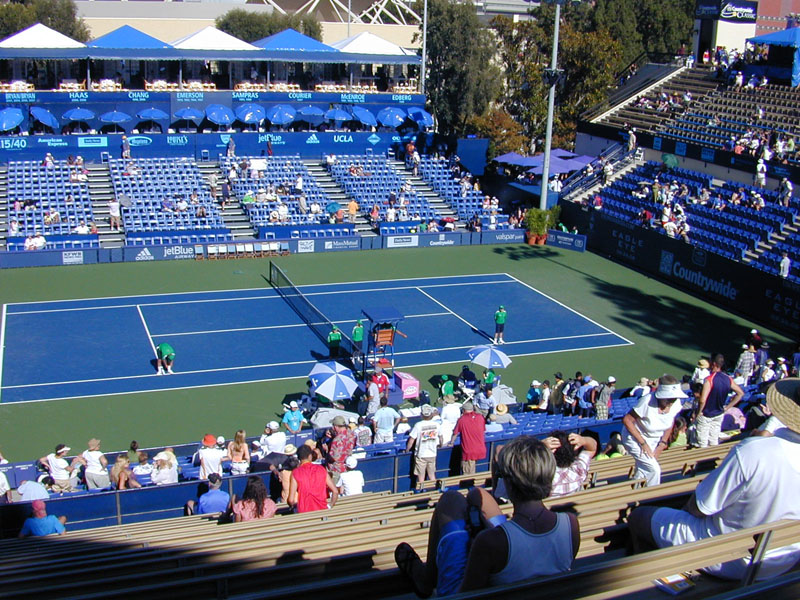
Straus Stadium at the L.A. Tennis Center, on the UCLA campus.

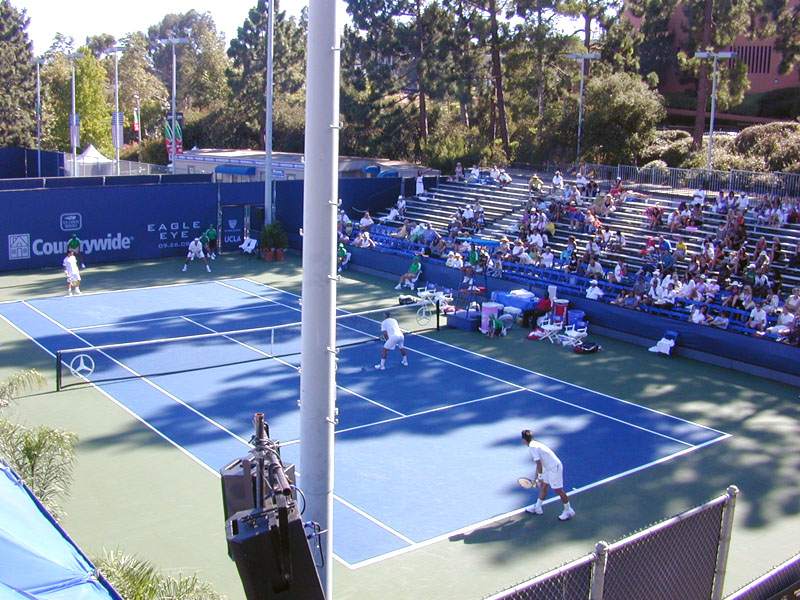
Grandstand court at the LA Tennis Open.

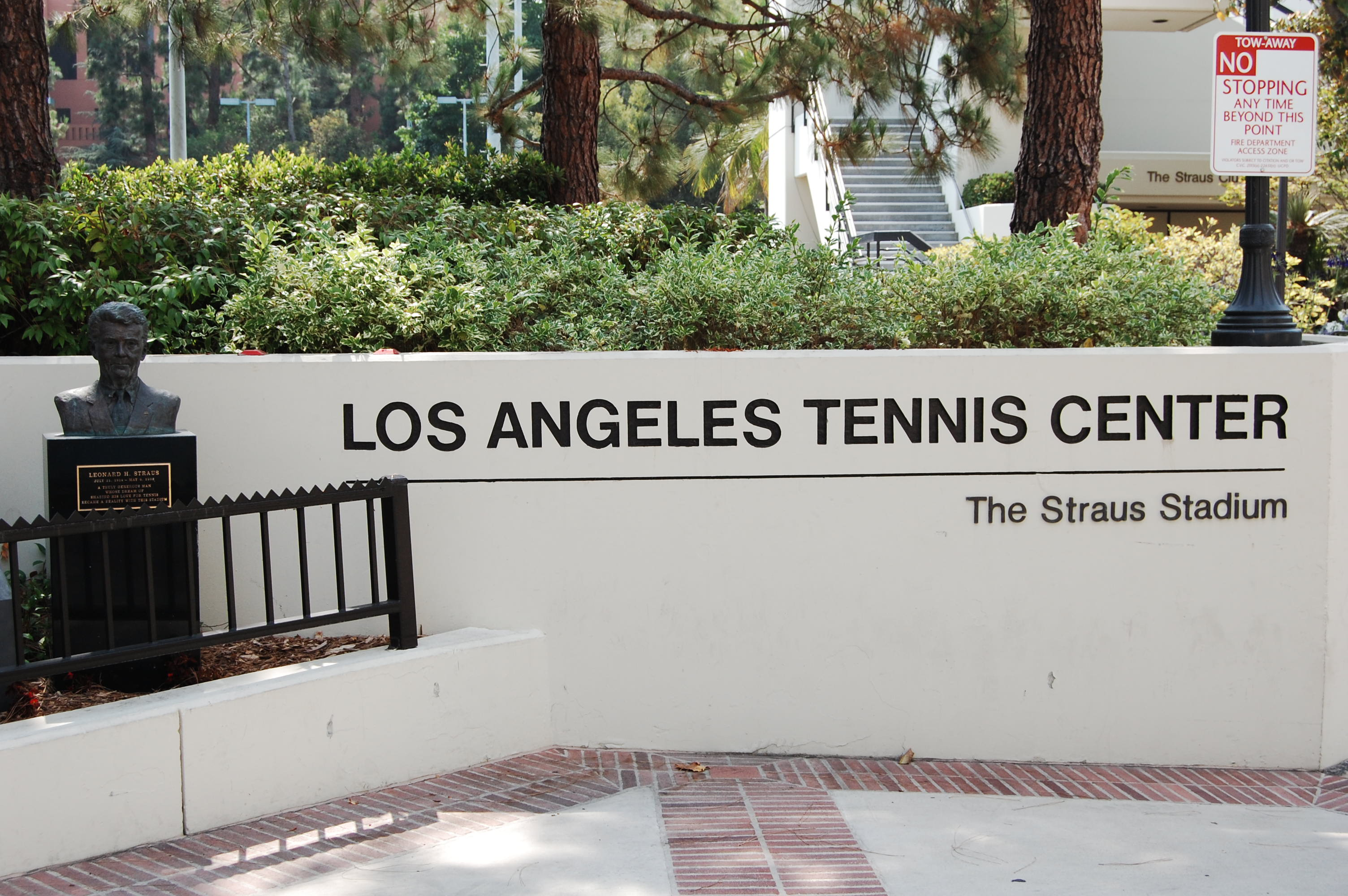
The LA Tennis Center

== See also ==
- List of tennis stadiums by capacity

Preceded by Sunset Canyon Courts	Home of the UCLA Bruins Tennis teams, LA Tennis Open (1985 - 2012)	Succeeded by Current
