= Los Angeles Open (tennis) =

Coordinates: 34.070°N 118.448°W

Defunct tennis tournament
- Founded: 1927
- Abolished: 2012
- Editions: 86
- Location: Los Angeles, California; United States
- Venue: Los Angeles Tennis Club (1927–1974, 1980–1983); Pauley Pavilion (1975–1979); Los Angeles Tennis Center (1984–2012)
- Category: ATP World Tour 250 series / ATP International Series / ATP World Series (1990–2012); Grand Prix Tour (1970–1989)
- Surface: Hard / outdoors
- Draw: 28S / 32Q / 16D (2012)
- Prize money: $557,550 (2012)

The Los Angeles Open was a former tennis tournament held in Los Angeles, United States from 1927 until 2012. It included a women's draw until 1974 when Linda Lewis won the last ladies title. Subsequently, it became a men-only event and integrated into the ATP's professional tennis circuit. The inaugural edition of the event, known as the Pacific Southwest Championships, was organized by Perry T. Jones and held at the Los Angeles Tennis Club (LATC) starting in October 1927. Bill Tilden and Kea Bouman were the first singles champions. The tournament quickly became a prestigious event on the tennis calendar.

== History ==
The tournament was usually held in September and hosted the top men (and until 1975, women) in the world. Tournament winners from its beginning in 1927 until 1967 included most of the world's No. 1 tennis players: Bill Tilden, Ellsworth Vines, Don Budge, Fred Perry, Jack Kramer, Pancho Gonzales and amateur champions Roy Emerson and Barry MacKay (tennis). In the open era the event was known by various (sponsored) names including Farmers Classic, Countrywide Classic, Los Angeles Tennis Open, Pacific South West Open and Jack Kramer Open. Jack Kramer became the tournament director in 1970 when Jones retired. In the open era, the tournament was won by Rod Laver twice, a second and third time by Gonzales, Stan Smith, Arthur Ashe, Jimmy Connors, John McEnroe, Pete Sampras, Richard Krajicek, and Andre Agassi. In doubles, Bob and Mike Bryan won a record six titles.

From 1975 to 1979 the tournament was played indoors at the Pauley Pavilion. Beginning in 1984, the tournament was held at the Los Angeles Tennis Center at UCLA, which was built to host the 1984 Summer Olympics tennis event. The matches were played on the Straus Stadium court with a capacity of 6,500 and the 1,500-seat capacity Grandstand court. In its last years it was an ATP World Tour 250 series tournament on the ATP Tour and had a 28-player singles draw and 16-team doubles draw. The tournament, with prize money of $557,550 in 2012, was one of the events included in the US Open Series. Special events during the tournament's run included Kids Day, Fashion Day, Valspar Performance Challenge, and a Legends Invitational Singles competition.

Colombian investors purchased the tournament's license for $1.5 million at the end of 2012 and moved the tournament to Bogotá where it was named the Claro Open Colombia.

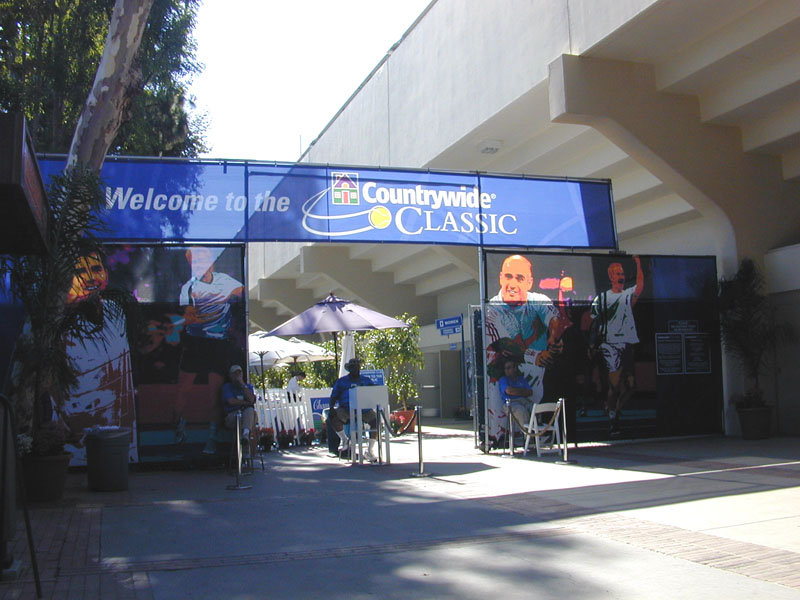
Main Entrance to the Countrywide Classic at UCLA's L.A. Tennis Center.

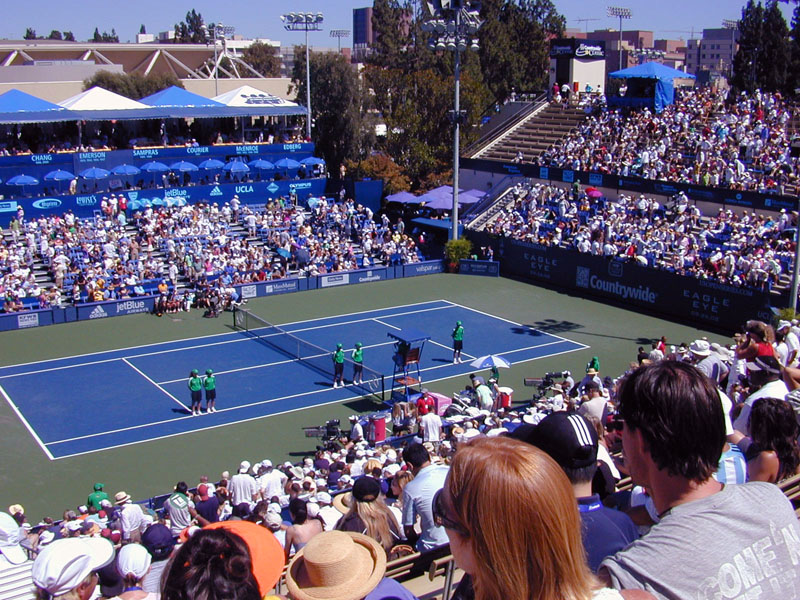
Straus Stadium at the L.A. Tennis Center, on the UCLA campus.

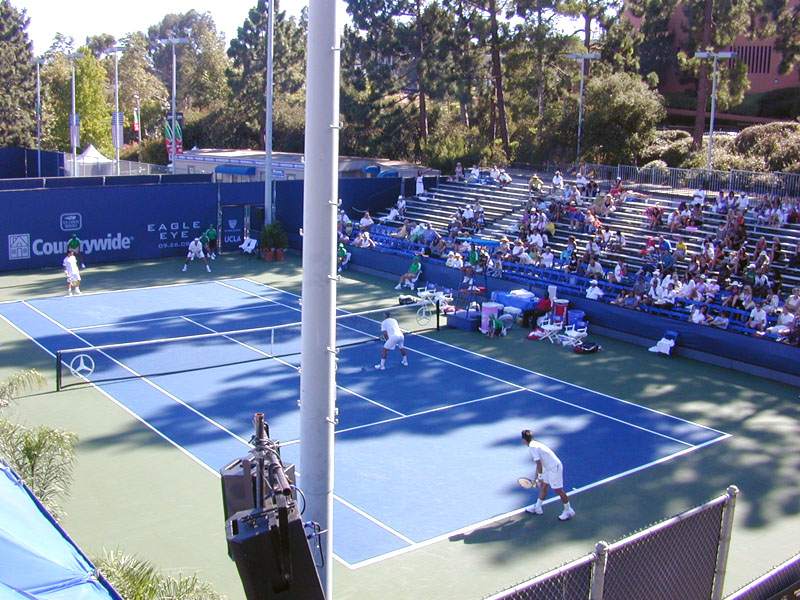
Grandstand court at the LA Tennis Open.

== Past winners ==
=== Men's singles ===
Year	Champions	Runners-up	Score
1927	(United States) Bill Tilden	(United States) Francis Hunter	6–2, 6–4, 6–2
1928	(France) Henri Cochet	(France) Christian Boussus	2–6, 6–4, 6–3, 6–3
1929	(United States) John Doeg	(United States) John Van Ryn	8–10, 7–5, 9–7, 8–6
1930	(United States) Ellsworth Vines	(United States) Gregory Mangin	14–12, 6–3, 6–4
1931	(United States) Ellsworth Vines (2)	(United Kingdom) Fred Perry	8–10, 6–3, 4–6, 7–5, 6–2
1932	(United Kingdom) Fred Perry	(Japan) Jiro Satoh	6–2, 6–4, 7–5
1933	(United Kingdom) Fred Perry (2)	(Japan) Jiro Satoh	6–4, 1–6, 6–0, 7–5
1934	(United Kingdom) Fred Perry (3)	(United States) Lester Stoefen	10–8, 6–4, 6–3
1935	(United States) Don Budge	(Czechoslovakia) Roderich Menzel	1–6, 11–9, 6–3, retired
1936	(United States) Don Budge (2)	(United Kingdom) Fred Perry	6–2, 4–6, 6–2, 6–2
1937	(United States) Don Budge (3)	(Nazi Germany) Gottfried von Cramm	2–6, 7–5, 6–4, 7–5
1938	(Australia) Adrian Quist	(Australia) Harry Hopman	6–3, 0–6, 6–4, 6–4
1939	(Australia) John Bromwich	(Kingdom of Yugoslavia) Franjo Punčec	4–6, 6–0, 6–2, 6–4
1940	(United States) Bobby Riggs	(United States) Don McNeill	5–7, 2–6, 6–0, 12–10, 6–3
1941	(United States) Frank Parker	(United States) Frank Kovacs	7–5, 6–0, 6–1
1942	(United States) Frank Parker (2)	(Ecuador) Pancho Segura	6–4, 6–1, 6–3
1943	(United States) Jack Kramer	(Ecuador) Pancho Segura	0–6, 6–1, 6–2
1944	(United States) Frank Parker (3)	(United States) William Talbert	6–4, 6–8, 8–6
1945	(United States) Frank Parker (4)	(United States) Herbert Flam	6–2, 6–4
1946	(United States) Jack Kramer (2)	(United States) Ted Schroeder	6–2, 6–8, 6–2, 8–6
1947	(United States) Jack Kramer (3)	(United States) Ted Schroeder	10–8, 6–4, 6–4
1948	(United States) Ted Schroeder	(United States) Frank Parker	4–6, 7–9, 7–5, retired
1949	(United States) Pancho Gonzalez	(United States) Ted Schroeder	6–3, 9–11, 8–6, 6–4
1950	(Australia) Frank Sedgman	(United States) Ted Schroeder	9–7, 6–3, 6–2
1951	(Australia) Frank Sedgman (2)	(United States) Tony Trabert	6–3, 6–3, 2–6, 6–4
1952	(United States) Vic Seixas	(Australia) Frank Sedgman	6–4, 6–4, 6–4
1953	(Australia) Ken Rosewall	(United States) Vic Seixas	6–4, 1–6, 3–6, 6–1, 6–4
1954	(United States) Vic Seixas (2)	(United States) Tony Trabert	7–5, 6–3, 6–4
1955	(United States) Tony Trabert	(United States) Herbert Flam	6–1, 6–4, 6–2
1956	(United States) Herbert Flam	(Australia) Ken Rosewall	4–6, 6–1, 5–7, 6–3, 7–5
1957	(United States) Vic Seixas (3)	(United States) Gilbert Shea	9–7, 6–3, 6–4
1958	(United States) Ham Richardson	(United States) Alex Olmedo	7–5, 6–2, 4–6, 9–7
1959	(Australia) Roy Emerson	(India) Ramanathan Krishnan	6–3, 4–6, 6–0, 6–4
1960	(United States) Barry MacKay (tennis)	(United States) Earl Buchholz	5–7, 6–4, 6–4, 3–6, 6–3
1961	(United States) Jon Douglas	(Australia) Roy Emerson	6–2, 1–6, 6–4
1962	(Australia) Roy Emerson (2)	(Australia) Rod Laver	16–14, 6–3
1963	(United States) Arthur Ashe	(United States) Whitney Reed	2–6, 9–7, 6–2
1964	(Australia) Roy Emerson (3)	(United States) Dennis Ralston	6–3, 6–3
1965	(United States) Dennis Ralston	(United States) Arthur Ashe	6–4, 6–3
1966	(United States) Allen Fox	(Australia) Roy Emerson	6–3, 6–3
1967	(Australia) Roy Emerson (4)	(United States) Marty Riessen	12–14, 6–3, 6–4
↓ Open Era ↓
1968	(Australia) Rod Laver	(Australia) Ken Rosewall	4–6, 6–0, 6–0
1969	(United States) Pancho Gonzalez (2)	(United States) Cliff Richey	6–0, 7–5
1970	(Australia) Rod Laver (2)	(Australia) John Newcombe	4–6, 6–4, 7–6^{(7–5)}
1971	(United States) Pancho Gonzalez (3)	(United States) Jimmy Connors	3–6, 6–3, 6–3
1972	(United States) Stan Smith	(United States) Roscoe Tanner	6–4, 6–4
1973	(United States) Jimmy Connors	(Netherlands) Tom Okker	7–5, 7–6
1974	(United States) Jimmy Connors (2)	(United States) Harold Solomon	6–3, 6–1
1975	(United States) Arthur Ashe (2)	(United States) Roscoe Tanner	3–6, 7–5, 6–3
1976	(United States) Brian Gottfried	(United States) Arthur Ashe	6–2, 6–2
1977	(United States) Stan Smith (2)	(United States) Brian Gottfried	6–4, 2–6, 6–3
1978	(United States) Arthur Ashe (3)	(United States) Brian Gottfried	6–2, 6–4
1979	(United States) Peter Fleming	(United States) John McEnroe	6–4, 6–4
1980	(United States) Gene Mayer	(United States) Brian Teacher	6–3, 6–2
1981	(United States) John McEnroe	(United States) Sandy Mayer	6–7, 6–3, 6–3
1982	(United States) Jimmy Connors (3)	(United States) Mel Purcell	6–2, 6–1
1983	(United States) Gene Mayer (2)	(United States) Johan Kriek	7–6, 6–1
1984	(United States) Jimmy Connors (4)	(United States) Eliot Teltscher	6–4, 4–6, 6–4
1985	(United States) Paul Annacone	(Sweden) Stefan Edberg	7–6^{(7–5)}, 6–7^{(8–10)}, 7–6^{(7–4)}
1986	(United States) John McEnroe (2)	(Sweden) Stefan Edberg	6–2, 6–3
1987	(United States) David Pate	(Sweden) Stefan Edberg	6–4, 6–4
1988	(Sweden) Mikael Pernfors	(United States) Andre Agassi	6–2, 7–5
1989	(United States) Aaron Krickstein	(United States) Michael Chang	2–6, 6–4, 6–2
1990	(Sweden) Stefan Edberg	(United States) Michael Chang	7–6, 2–6, 7–6
1991	(United States) Pete Sampras	(United States) Brad Gilbert	6–2, 6–7^{(5–7)}, 6–3
1992	(Netherlands) Richard Krajicek	(Australia) Mark Woodforde	6–4, 2–6, 6–4
1993	(Netherlands) Richard Krajicek (2)	(United States) Michael Chang	0–6, 7–6^{(7–3)}, 7–6^{(7–5)}
1994	(Germany) Boris Becker	(Australia) Mark Woodforde	6–2, 6–2
1995	(Germany) Michael Stich	(Sweden) Thomas Enqvist	6–7^{(7–9)}, 7–6^{(7–4)}, 6–2
1996	(United States) Michael Chang	(Netherlands) Richard Krajicek	6–4, 6–3
1997	(United States) Jim Courier	(Sweden) Thomas Enqvist	6–4, 6–4
1998	(United States) Andre Agassi	(United Kingdom) Tim Henman	6–4, 6–4
1999	(United States) Pete Sampras (2)	(United States) Andre Agassi	7–6^{(7–3)}, 7–6^{(7–1)}
2000	(United States) Michael Chang (2)	(United States) Jan-Michael Gambill	6–7^{(2–7)}, 6–3, retired
2001	(United States) Andre Agassi (2)	(United States) Pete Sampras	6–4, 6–2
2002	(United States) Andre Agassi (3)	(United States) Jan-Michael Gambill	6–2, 6–4
2003	(South Africa) Wayne Ferreira	(Australia) Lleyton Hewitt	6–3, 4–6, 7–5
2004	(Germany) Tommy Haas	(Germany) Nicolas Kiefer	7–6^{(8–6)}, 6–4
2005	(United States) Andre Agassi (4)	(Luxembourg) Gilles Müller	6–4, 7–5
2006	(Germany) Tommy Haas (2)	(Russia) Dmitry Tursunov	4–6, 7–5, 6–3
2007	(Czech Republic) Radek Štěpánek	(United States) James Blake	7–6^{(9–7)}, 5–7, 6–2
2008	(Argentina) Juan Martín del Potro	(United States) Andy Roddick	6–1, 7–6^{(7–2)}
2009	(United States) Sam Querrey	(Australia) Carsten Ball	6–4, 3–6, 6–1
2010	(United States) Sam Querrey (2)	(United Kingdom) Andy Murray	5–7, 7–6^{(7–2)}, 6–3
2011	(Latvia) Ernests Gulbis	(United States) Mardy Fish	5–7, 6–4, 6–4
2012	(United States) Sam Querrey (3)	(Lithuania) Ričardas Berankis	6–0, 6–2
2013	succeeded by Claro Open Colombia		

=== Women's singles ===
Year	Champions	Runners-up	Score
1927	(Netherlands) Kea Bouman	(United States) Molla Bjurstedt Mallory	6–2, 0–6, 6–4
1928	(United States) May Sutton Bundy	(United States) Marjorie Gladman	6–1, 6–2
1929	(United Kingdom) Betty Nuthall	(United States) Anna McCune Harper	8–6, 7–5
1930	(United States) Ethel Burkhardt	(United States) Marjorie Gladstone	8–6, 6–0
1931	(United States) Anna McCune Harper	(United States) Josephine Cruickshank	3–6, 6–3, 6–4
1932	(United States) Anna McCune Harper	(United States) Alice Marble	10–8, 6–3
1933	(United Kingdom) Dorothy Round	(United States) Alice Marble	6–2, 6–2
1934	(United States) Ethel Burkhardt	(United Kingdom) Kay Stammers	10–8, 1–6, 6–4
1935	(United States) Ethel Burkhardt	(United Kingdom) Kay Stammers	6–1, 6–4
1936	(United States) Gracyn Wheeler	(United States) Alice Marble	7–5, 2–6, 6–4
1937	(United States) Alice Marble	(United States) Gracyn Wheeler	6–1, 6–0
1938	(United States) Dorothy Bundy	(United States) Sarah Palfrey Fabyan	6–4, 6–4
1939	(United States) Alice Marble	(United States) Dorothy Bundy	9–7, 6–1
1940	(United States) Dorothy Bundy	(United Kingdom) Valerie Scott	6–3, 6–3
1941	(United States) Sarah Palfrey Cooke	(United States) Dorothy Bundy	6–3, 7–5
1942	(United States) Pauline Betz	(United States) Louise Brough	6–2, 6–2
1943	(United States) Louise Brough	(United States) Mary Arnold	6–3, 6–3
1944	(United States) Pauline Betz	(United States) Margaret Osborne	6–4, 6–3
1945	(United States) Margaret Osborne	(United States) Louise Brough	11–9, 6–2
1946	(United States) Pauline Betz	(United States) Dorothy Bundy	6–2, 6–2
1947	(United States) Beverly Baker	(United States) Patricia Canning Todd	6–3, 6–2
1948	(United States) Louise Brough	(United States) Beverly Baker	6–2, 6–3
1949	(United States) Helen Perez	(United States) Beverly Baker	7–5, 5–7, 4–1 ret.
1950	(United States) Helen Perez	(United States) Dorothy Bundy Cheney	6–2, 6–2
1951	(United States) Maureen Connolly	(United States) Beverly Baker	9–7, 6–4
1952	(United States) Maureen Connolly	(United States) Doris Hart	6–4, 3–6, 6–1
1953	(United States) Doris Hart	(United States) Shirley Fry	1–6, 6–3, 6–4
1954	(United States) Louise Brough	(United States) Barbara Breit	6–3, 4–6, 6–1
1955	(United States) Beverly Baker Fleitz	(United States) Barbara Breit	6–1, 6–4
1956	(United States) Althea Gibson	(United States) Nancy Chaffee	4–6, 6–2, 6–1
1957	(United States) Althea Gibson	(United States) Louise Brough	6–3, 6–1
1958	(United States) Beverly Baker Fleitz	(United States) Darlene Hard	6–3, 9–7
1959	(United States) Beverly Baker Fleitz	(Brazil) Maria Bueno	4–6, 6–4, 6–3
1960	(United Kingdom) Ann Haydon	(United States) Darlene Hard	6–4, 6–3
1961	(United States) Darlene Hard	(United States) Karen Hantze Susman	5–7, 6–2, 6–3
1962	(United States) Carole Caldwell	(United States) Darlene Hard	6–8, 11–9, 2–4 ret.
1963	(United States) Darlene Hard	(United States) Billie Jean Moffitt	6–3, 6–3
1964	(Brazil) Maria Bueno	(United States) Billie Jean Moffitt	3–6, 6–3, 6–2
1965	(United States) Carole Caldwell Graebner	(United States) Tory Fretz	6–4, 6–4
1966	(Brazil) Maria Bueno	(United States) Patti Hogan	6–2, 6–2
1967	(United States) Billie Jean King	(United States) Rosemary Casals	6–0, 6–4
1968	(United States) Rosemary Casals	(Brazil) Maria Bueno	6–3, 6–1
1969	(United States) Billie Jean King	(United Kingdom) Ann Haydon Jones	6–2, 6–3
1970	(United States) Sharon Walsh	(Australia) Lesley Hunt	6–3, 6–2
1971	(United States) Rosemary Casals & (United States) Billie Jean King		6–6 joint default
1972	(United States) Marita Redondo	(United States) Janice Metcalf	7–5, 5–7, 6–2
1973	(United States) Kathy May	(United States) Lea Antonoplis	5–7, 6–1, 6–2
1974	(United States) Linda Lewis	(United States) Susan Hagey	6–2, 6–2
1974	women's events discontinued		

=== Men's doubles ===
Year	Champions	Runners-up	Score
1968	(Australia) Ken Rosewall (Australia) Fred Stolle	(South Africa) Cliff Drysdale (United Kingdom) Roger Taylor	7–5, 6–1
1969	(United States) Pancho Gonzales (United States) Ron Holmberg	(United States) Jim McManus (United States) Jim Osborne	6–3, 6–4
1970	(Netherlands) Tom Okker (United States) Marty Riessen	(United States) Stan Smith (United States) Bob Lutz	7–6, 6–2
1971	(Australia) John Alexander (Australia) Phil Dent	(United States) Frank Froehling (United States) Clark Graebner	7–6, 6–4
1972	(United States) Jimmy Connors (United States) Pancho Gonzales (2)	(Egypt) Ismail El Shafei (New Zealand) Brian Fairlie	6–3, 7–6
1973	(Czechoslovakia) Jan Kodeš (Czechoslovakia) Vladimír Zedník	(United States) Jimmy Connors (Romania) Ilie Nastase	6–2, 6–4
1974	(Australia) Ross Case (Australia) Geoff Masters	(United States) Brian Gottfried (Mexico) Raúl Ramírez	6–3, 6–2
1975	(India) Anand Amritraj (India) Vijay Amritraj	(South Africa) Cliff Drysdale (United States) Marty Riessen	7–6, 4–6, 6–4
1976	(United States) Robert Lutz (United States) Stan Smith	(United States) Arthur Ashe (United States) Charlie Pasarell	6–2, 3–6, 6–2
1977	(South Africa) Bob Hewitt (South Africa) Frew McMillan	(United States) Robert Lutz (United States) Stan Smith	6–3, 6–4
1978	(Australia) John Alexander (2) (Australia) Phil Dent (2)	(United States) Fred McNair (Mexico) Raúl Ramírez	7–6, 6–3
1979	(United States) Marty Riessen (2) (United States) Sherwood Stewart	(Poland) Wojciech Fibak (South Africa) Frew McMillan	6–4, 6–4
1980	(United States) Brian Teacher (United States) Butch Walts	(India) Anand Amritraj (United States) John Austin	6–2, 6–4
1981	(United States) Tom Gullikson (United States) Butch Walts	(United States) John McEnroe (United States) Ferdi Taygan	6–4, 6–4
1982	(United States) Sherwood Stewart (2) (United States) Ferdi Taygan	(United States) Bruce Manson (United States) Brian Teacher	6–1, 6–7, 6–3
1983	(United States) Peter Fleming (United States) John McEnroe (2)	(United States) Sandy Mayer (United States) Ferdi Taygan	6–1, 6–2
1984	(United States) Ken Flach (United States) Robert Seguso	(Poland) Wojtek Fibak (United States) Sandy Mayer	4–6, 6–4, 6–3
1985	(United States) Scott Davis (United States) Robert Van't Hof	(United States) Paul Annacone (South Africa) Christo van Rensburg	6–3, 7–6
1986	(Sweden) Stefan Edberg (Sweden) Anders Järryd	(United States) Peter Fleming (United States) John McEnroe	3–6, 7–5, 7–6
1987	(South Africa) Kevin Curren (United States) David Pate	(United States) Brad Gilbert (United States) Tim Wilkison	6–3, 6–4
1988	(United States) John McEnroe (3) (Australia) Mark Woodforde	(Australia) Peter Doohan (United States) Jim Grabb	6–4, 6–4
1989	(United States) Martin Davis (United States) Tim Pawsat	(Australia) John Fitzgerald (Sweden) Anders Järryd	7–5, 7–6
1990	(United States) Scott Davis (2) (United States) David Pate (2)	(Sweden) Peter Lundgren (Kenya) Paul Wekesa	3–6, 6–1, 6–3
1991	(Argentina) Javier Frana (United States) Jim Pugh	(Canada) Glenn Michibata (United States) Brad Pearce	7–5, 2–6, 6–4
1992	(United States) Patrick Galbraith (United States) Jim Pugh (2)	(United States) Francisco Montana (United States) David Wheaton	7–6, 7–6
1993	(South Africa) Wayne Ferreira (Germany) Michael Stich	(Canada) Grant Connell (United States) Scott Davis	7–6, 7–6
1994	(Australia) John Fitzgerald (Australia) Mark Woodforde (2)	(United States) Scott Davis (United States) Brian MacPhie	4–6, 6–2, 6–0
1995	(South Africa) Brent Haygarth (United States) Kent Kinnear	(United States) Scott Davis (Croatia) Goran Ivanišević	6–4, 7–6
1996	(South Africa) Marius Barnard (South Africa) Piet Norval	(Sweden) Jonas Björkman (Sweden) Nicklas Kulti	7–5, 6–2
1997	(Canada) Sébastien Lareau (United States) Alex O'Brien	(India) Mahesh Bhupathi (United States) Rick Leach	7–6, 6–4
1998	(Australia) Patrick Rafter (Australia) Sandon Stolle	(United States) Jeff Tarango (Czech Republic) Daniel Vacek	6–4, 6–4
1999	(Zimbabwe) Byron Black (South Africa) Wayne Ferreira (2)	(Croatia) Goran Ivanišević (United States) Brian MacPhie	6–2, 7–6^{(7–4)}
2000	(Australia) Paul Kilderry (Australia) Sandon Stolle	(United States) Jan-Michael Gambill (United States) Scott Humphries	walkover
2001	(United States) Bob Bryan (United States) Mike Bryan	(United States) Jan-Michael Gambill (United States) Andy Roddick	7–5, 7–6^{(8–6)}
2002	(France) Sébastien Grosjean (Germany) Nicolas Kiefer	(United States) Justin Gimelstob (France) Michaël Llodra	6–4, 6–4
2003	(United States) Jan-Michael Gambill (United States) Travis Parrott	(Australia) Joshua Eagle (Netherlands) Sjeng Schalken	6–4, 3–6, 7–5
2004	(United States) Bob Bryan (2) (United States) Mike Bryan (2)	(Australia) Wayne Arthurs (Australia) Paul Hanley	6–3, 7–6^{(8–6)}
2005	(United States) Rick Leach (United States) Brian MacPhie	(Israel) Jonathan Erlich (Israel) Andy Ram	6–3, 6–4
2006	(United States) Bob Bryan (3) (United States) Mike Bryan (3)	(United States) Eric Butorac (United Kingdom) Jamie Murray	6–2, 6–4
2007	(United States) Bob Bryan (4) (United States) Mike Bryan (4)	(United States) Scott Lipsky (United States) David Martin	7–6^{(7–5)}, 6–2
2008	(India) Rohan Bopanna (United States) Eric Butorac	(United States) Travis Parrott (Serbia) Dušan Vemić	7–6^{(7–5)}, 7–6^{(7–5)}
2009	(United States) Bob Bryan (5) (United States) Mike Bryan (5)	(Germany) Benjamin Becker (Germany) Frank Moser	6–4, 7–6^{(7–2)}
2010	(United States) Bob Bryan (6) (United States) Mike Bryan (6)	(United States) Eric Butorac (Netherlands Antilles) Jean-Julien Rojer	6–7^{(6–8)}, 6–2, [10–7]
2011	(The Bahamas) Mark Knowles (Belgium) Xavier Malisse	(India) Somdev Devvarman (Philippines) Treat Conrad Huey	7–6^{(7–3)}, 7–6^{(12–10)}
2012	(Belgium) Ruben Bemelmans (Belgium) Xavier Malisse (2)	(United Kingdom) Jamie Delgado (United Kingdom) Ken Skupski	7–6^{(7–5)}, 4–6, [10–7]

== Most titles ==
# of titles	Name	Years
Singles
4	(United States) Andre Agassi (United States) Jimmy Connors (Australia) Roy Emerson (United States) Frank Parker	2005, 2002, 2001, 1998; 1984, 1982, 1974, 1973; 1967, 1964, 1962, 1959; 1945, 1944, 1942, 1941
3	(United States) Sam Querrey (United States) Arthur Ashe (United States) Pancho Gonzalez (United States) Vic Seixas (United States) Jack Kramer (United States) Donald Budge (United Kingdom) Fred Perry	2012, 2010, 2009; 1978, 1975, 1963; 1971, 1969, 1949; 1957, 1954, 1952; 1947, 1946, 1943; 1937, 1936, 1935; 1934, 1933, 1932
2	(Germany) Tommy Haas (United States) Michael Chang (United States) Pete Sampras (Netherlands) Richard Krajicek (United States) John McEnroe (United States) Gene Mayer (United States) Stan Smith (Australia) Rod Laver (Australia) Frank Sedgman (United States) Ellsworth Vines	2006, 2004; 2000, 1996; 1999, 1991; 1993, 1992; 1986, 1981; 1983, 1980; 1977, 1972; 1970, 1968; 1951, 1950; 1931, 1930
Doubles
6	(United States) Bob Bryan (United States) Mike Bryan	2010, 2009, 2007, 2006, 2004, 2001; 2010, 2009, 2007, 2006, 2004, 2001

== Previous names ==
Years	Name	Sponsor
2010–2012	Farmers Classic	Farmers Insurance Group
2009	LA Tennis Open	None
2006–2008	Countrywide Classic	Countrywide Bank
1998–2005	Mercedes-Benz Cup	Mercedes-Benz
1995–1997	Infiniti Open	Infiniti
1979–1981	Jack Kramer Open	None
	Los Angeles Open	Volvo
1927–1975	Pacific Southwest Championships	

== See also ==
- Pacific Coast Championships – tournament held in various locations in Northern California (1889–2013)
- LA Women's Tennis Championships – women's tournament (1971–2009)
