= Jan-Michael Gambill =

American tennis player

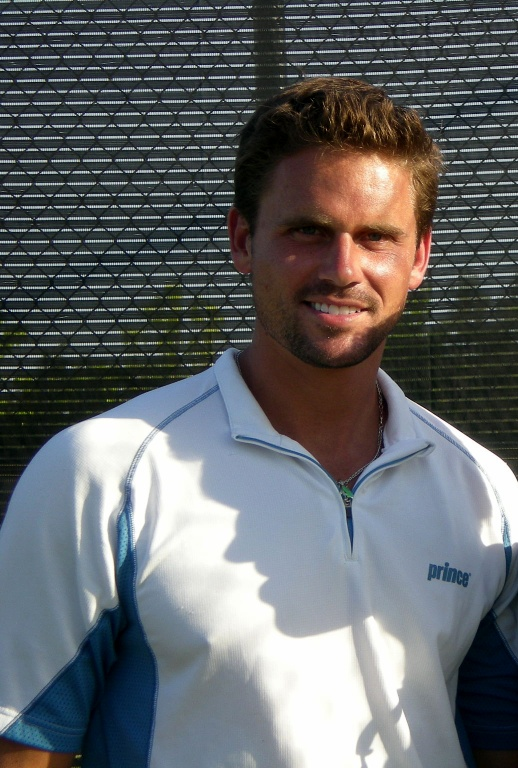
- Full name: Jan-Michael Charles Gambill
- Country (sports): United States
- Residence: Hawaii
- Born: June 3, 1977 (age 48) Spokane, Washington, U.S.
- Height: 1.90 m (6 ft 3 in)
- Turned pro: 1996
- Retired: 2010 (inactive in singles since)
- Plays: Right-handed (two-handed both sides, occasionally one-handed forehand)
- Prize money: $3,612,179

Singles
- Career record: 201–196 (ATP Tour and Grand Slam-level, and in Davis Cup)
- Career titles: 3
- Highest ranking: No. 14 (June 18, 2001)

Grand Slam singles results
- Australian Open: 2R (2003, 2004)
- French Open: 2R (1998, 2000)
- Wimbledon: QF (2000)
- US Open: 4R (2002)

Doubles
- Career record: 119–125 (ATP Tour and Grand Slam-level, and in Davis Cup)
- Career titles: 5
- Highest ranking: No. 23 (November 4, 2002)

Grand Slam doubles results
- Australian Open: 3R (2000)
- French Open: 2R (2002)
- Wimbledon: 3R (2002)
- US Open: 2R (1999, 2000)

Mixed doubles
- Career record: 3–2
- Career titles: 0

Grand Slam mixed doubles results
- US Open: QF (2000)

Team competitions
- Davis Cup: SF (1998, 2000)
- Hopman Cup: F (2001, 2002)

Jan-Michael Charles Gambill (born June 3, 1977) is an American former professional tennis player who made his professional debut in 1996. His career-high singles ranking is world No. 14, which he achieved on June 18, 2001. Best known for his unusual double-handed forehand, Gambill reached the quarterfinals of the 2000 Wimbledon Championships, the final of the 2001 Miami Masters, and won three singles titles.

== Early life ==
Gambill spent the early years of his life in the countryside of Spokane, Washington. He currently resides in both Los Angeles and Kailua-Kona, Hawaii with his partner, architect and developer Malek Alqadi. While Jan-Michael has been sponsored by car manufacturer Jaguar, he also supports real-life Jaguars and tigers through Cat Tales Zoological Park, an organization dedicated to saving the lives of big cats. Gambill has also raised money for his long-time friend Sir Elton John's charity, the Elton John AIDS Foundation.

Gambill's career as a professional athlete has evolved into coaching tennis players as well as being an international analyst for BeIn sports. Gambill was also sponsored by Prince for both his racquets and apparel.

== Tennis career ==
=== 1996–2005 ===
Gambill began playing tennis at the age of five, looking up to multiple Grand Slam singles titlists Jimmy Connors and John McEnroe. He has defeated, amongst other top players, former World No. 1s, Roger Federer, Carlos Moyá, Lleyton Hewitt, Gustavo Kuerten, Marcelo Ríos, Jim Courier, Pete Sampras, and Andre Agassi, as well as Grand Slam champions Michael Chang, Thomas Johansson, Sergi Bruguera, and Gastón Gaudio. His best performances at Grand Slams have been reaching the quarterfinals of Wimbledon in 2000 and the fourth round of the US Open in 2002. His run at Wimbledon in 2000 saw him beat Lleyton Hewitt, Fabrice Santoro, Paul Goldstein and Thomas Enqvist before losing to eventual champion Pete Sampras. His run to the final of the 2001 Miami Masters included wins over Hewitt, Gaudio, and Thomas Enqvist. He was coached by his father Chuck Gambill (1947–2020), who coached Jan-Michael's younger brother Torrey, who was also a professional tennis player.

Throughout his career, Gambill was hampered by numerous injuries. Most prominently, while still in the world's top 40, he suffered a recurring shin condition, which severely limited him on the ATP Tour after 2004. He also started serving harder to try and compensate for lack of movement, which resulted in a shoulder injury.

=== Post–2005 ===
Gambill played for the Boston Lobsters in the World Team Tennis league from 2008 onwards, alongside other successful American players such as Andre Agassi, John Isner, and Robby Ginepri.

In September 2009, Gambill reached the semifinals of the USA F23 Futures tournament (losing to second seed Michael McClune) in his first pro match of the year.

He competed in three Challenger events in 2010, and reached the quarterfinals of the USA F25 Futures in Irvine, California. Since October 2010, Gambill has not competed on the pro tour.

Since July 2011, he has coached top 10 player CoCo Vandeweghe, his former Boston Lobsters teammate, on the WTA Tour. In 2017, he coached top 50 player Jared Donaldson on the ATP Tour. As of 2020, he is currently in broadcasting and television as a Sports Analyst on the Tennis Channel.

== Personal life ==
Gambill is gay and in a relationship with architectural designer and developer Malek Alqadi.

== ATP Tour finals ==
=== Singles (3 titles, 4 runner-ups) ===
Legend
Grand Slam tournaments (0–0)
Tennis Masters Cup (0–0)
ATP Masters Series (0–1)
ATP Tour (3–3)

Result	W-L	Date	Tournament	Surface	Opponent	Score
Win	1–0	Mar 1999	Scottsdale, United States	Hard	(Australia) Lleyton Hewitt	7–6^{(7–2)}, 4–6, 6–4
Loss	1–1	Jul 2000	Los Angeles, United States	Hard	(United States) Michael Chang	7–6^{(7–2)}, 3–6, retired
Win	2–1	Mar 2001	Delray Beach, United States	Hard	(Belgium) Xavier Malisse	7–5, 6–4
Loss	2–2	Apr 2001	Miami, United States	Hard	(United States) Andre Agassi	6–7^{(4–7)}, 1–6, 0–6
Loss	2–3	Jul 2002	Los Angeles, United States	Hard	(United States) Andre Agassi	2–6, 4–6
Loss	2–4	Jan 2003	Doha, Qatar	Hard	(Austria) Stefan Koubek	4–6, 4–6
Win	3–4	Mar 2003	Delray Beach, United States (2)	Hard	(United States) Mardy Fish	6–0, 7–6^{(7–5)}

== Performance timeline ==
Key
W	F	SF	QF	#R	RR	Q#	DNQ	A	NH

(W) winner; (F) finalist; (SF) semifinalist; (QF) quarterfinalist; (#R) rounds 4, 3, 2, 1; (RR) round-robin stage; (Q#) qualification round; (DNQ) did not qualify; (A) absent; (NH) not held; (SR) strike rate (events won / competed); (W–L) win–loss record.

Tournament	1997	1998	1999	2000	2001	2002	2003	2004	2005	2006	2007	2008	2009	2010
Australian Open	A	1R	1R	1R	1R	1R	2R	2R	1R	A	A	A	A	A
French Open	A	2R	1R	2R	1R	1R	1R	1R	A	A	A	A	A	A
Wimbledon	Q1	2R	2R	QF	1R	2R	2R	3R	Q3	A	A	A	A	A
US Open	1R	3R	2R	3R	2R	4R	2R	2R	1R	A	A	A	A	A
ATP Masters Series
Indian Wells Masters	A	SF	2R	1R	QF	3R	1R	2R	1R	A	1R	A	A	A
Miami Masters	A	1R	2R	QF	F	3R	2R	1R	A	A	A	A	A	A
Monte Carlo Masters	A	A	A	A	A	1R	A	A	A	A	A	A	A	A
Rome Masters	A	A	1R	A	1R	A	1R	A	A	A	A	A	A	A
Hamburg Masters	A	A	2R	2R	3R	1R	1R	A	A	A	A	A	A	A
Canada Masters	A	2R	2R	A	3R	A	A	A	A	A	1R	A	A	A
Cincinnati Masters	A	3R	2R	A	QF	2R	1R	1R	A	A	A	A	A	A
Madrid Masters (Stuttgart)	A	QF	A	1R	1R	2R	3R	A	A	A	A	A	A	A
Paris Masters	A	A	A	3R	A	1R	A	A	A	A	A	A	A	A
ATP Tournaments Won	0	0	1	0	1	0	1	0	0	0	0	0	0	0
Year End Ranking	186	38	58	33	21	42	51	95	191	687	1107	1147	891	1051
