= 1995 Tokyo Indoor – Doubles =

Doubles
- 1995 Tokyo Indoor

Final
- Champions: (Netherlands) Jacco Eltingh; (Netherlands) Paul Haarhuis
- Runners-up: (Switzerland) Jakob Hlasek; (United States) John McEnroe
- Score: 7–6, 6–4

Events
| Singles | Doubles |
| ← 1994 · | Tokyo Indoor |

Grant Connell and Patrick Galbraith were the defending champions, but lost in the quarterfinals this year.

Jacco Eltingh and Paul Haarhuis won the title, defeating Jakob Hlasek and John McEnroe 7–6, 6–4 in the final.

== Seeds ==
All seeds receive a bye into the second round.

1. (Netherlands) Jacco Eltingh / (Netherlands) Paul Haarhuis (champions)
2. (Canada) Grant Connell / (United States) Patrick Galbraith (quarterfinals)
3. (Zimbabwe) Byron Black / (United States) Jonathan Stark (quarterfinals)
4. (Australia) Mark Philippoussis / (Australia) Mark Woodforde (quarterfinals)
5. (United States) Alex O'Brien / (Australia) Sandon Stolle (semifinals)
6. (United States) Tommy Ho / (New Zealand) Brett Steven (semifinals)
7. (Switzerland) Jakob Hlasek / (United States) John McEnroe (final)
8. (South Africa) David Adams / (Canada) Sébastien Lareau (quarterfinals)

== Draw ==
=== Key ===
- Q = Qualifier
- WC = Wild card
- LL = Lucky loser
- Alt = Alternate
- SE = Special exempt
- PR = Protected ranking
- ITF = ITF entry
- JE = Junior exempt
- w/o = Walkover
- r = Retired
- d = Defaulted
- SR = Special ranking

=== Finals ===
Semifinals

Final

1
- (Netherlands) Jacco Eltingh
- (Netherlands) Paul Haarhuis
4
6
6

6
- (United States) Tommy Ho
- (New Zealand) Brett Steven
6
1
4

1
- (Netherlands) Jacco Eltingh
- (Netherlands) Paul Haarhuis
7
6

7
- (Switzerland) Jakob Hlasek
- (United States) John McEnroe
6
4

5
- (United States) Alex O'Brien
- (Australia) Sandon Stolle
3
6
3

7
- (Switzerland) Jakob Hlasek
- (United States) John McEnroe
6
4
6

=== Top half ===
First round

Second round

Quarterfinals

Semifinals

1
- (Netherlands) J Eltingh
- (Netherlands) P Haarhuis
6
6

- (India) M Bhupathi
- (India) L Paes
1
6
3

- (United States) K Flach
- (United States) K Jones
2
2

- (United States) K Flach
- (United States) K Jones
6
3
6

1
- (Netherlands) J Eltingh
- (Netherlands) P Haarhuis
4
7
6

WC
- (United States) C Chang
- (United States) M Chang
3
4

8
- (South Africa) D Adams
- (Canada) S Lareau
6
5
4

- (Australia) J Eagle
- (Australia) A Florent
6
6

- (Australia) J Eagle
- (Australia) A Florent
5
7
4

8
- (South Africa) D Adams
- (Canada) S Lareau
7
5
6

1
- (Netherlands) J Eltingh
- (Netherlands) P Haarhuis
4
6
6

6
- (United States) T Ho
- (New Zealand) B Steven
6
1
4

3
- (Zimbabwe) B Black
- (United States) J Stark
6
6

- (Australia) P Kilderry
- (Australia) A Kratzmann
4
6

WC
- (Spain) S Bruguera
- (Netherlands) R Krajicek
4
4

WC
- (Spain) S Bruguera
- (Netherlands) R Krajicek
6
7

3
- (Zimbabwe) B Black
- (United States) J Stark
6
2
3

WC
- (Japan) G Motomura
- (Japan) T Sato
1
5

6
- (United States) T Ho
- (New Zealand) B Steven
2
6
6

- (United Kingdom) A Richardson
- (United Kingdom) D Sapsford
6
7

- (United Kingdom) A Richardson
- (United Kingdom) D Sapsford
3
6

6
- (United States) T Ho
- (New Zealand) B Steven
6
7

=== Bottom half ===
First round

Second round

Quarterfinals

Semifinals

5
- (United States) A O'Brien
- (Australia) S Stolle
5
7
6

WC
- (Japan) S Iwabuchi
- (Japan) T Suzuki
6
2
6

WC
- (Japan) S Iwabuchi
- (Japan) T Suzuki
7
5
4

- (Australia) J Morgan
- (Australia) M Tebbutt
4
6
4

5
- (United States) A O'Brien
- (Australia) S Stolle
6
6

Q
- (United Kingdom) J Bates
- (United Kingdom) T Henman
6
3

4
- (Australia) M Philippoussis
- (Australia) M Woodforde
4
2

- (Croatia) G Ivanišević
- (Japan) S Matsuoka
7
6

- (Croatia) G Ivanišević
- (Japan) S Matsuoka
3
7
2

4
- (Australia) M Philippoussis
- (Australia) M Woodforde
6
6
6

5
- (United States) A O'Brien
- (Australia) S Stolle
3
6
3

7
- (Switzerland) J Hlasek
- (United States) J McEnroe
6
4
6

7
- (Switzerland) J Hlasek
- (United States) J McEnroe
6
6
6

- (Sweden) S Edberg
- (Sweden) H Holm
6
6

- (Sweden) S Edberg
- (Sweden) H Holm
1
7
3

LL
- (United Kingdom) A Foster
- (The Bahamas) R Smith
3
2

7
- (Switzerland) J Hlasek
- (United States) J McEnroe
3
6
7

- (Belgium) D Norman
- (Netherlands) F Wibier
7
7

2
- (Canada) G Connell
- (United States) P Galbraith
6
3
6

- (United States) S Davis
- (United States) T Martin
6
6

- (Belgium) D Norman
- (Netherlands) F Wibier
2
5

2
- (Canada) G Connell
- (United States) P Galbraith
6
7
