= 1995 Tokyo Indoor =

- Date: 9–15 October
- Edition: 18th
- Category: Championship Series
- Draw: 48S / 24D
- Surface: Carpet / indoor
- Location: Tokyo, Japan

Champions

Singles
- (United States) Michael Chang

Doubles
- (Netherlands) Jacco Eltingh / (Netherlands) Paul Haarhuis
← 1994 ·	Tokyo Indoor

The 1995 Tokyo Indoor also known as "Seiko Super Tennis" was a tennis tournament played on indoor carpet courts in Tokyo in Japan that was part of the IBM 1995 ATP Tour and was an ATP Championship Series event, today known as the ATP World Tour 500 series. The tournament was held from 9 October through 15 October 1995. Matches were the best of three sets. This was last time the tournament would be held.

== Finals ==
=== Singles ===
(United States) Michael Chang defeated (Australia) Mark Philippoussis 6–3, 6–4

- It was Chang's 3rd singles title of the year and the 22nd of his career.

=== Doubles ===
(Netherlands) Jacco Eltingh / (Netherlands) Paul Haarhuis defeated (Switzerland) Jakob Hlasek / (United States) John McEnroe 7–6, 6–4
