= 1989 Los Angeles Open – Doubles =

Doubles
- 1989 Los Angeles Open

Final
- Champions: (United States) Martin Davis (United States) Tim Pawsat
- Runners-up: (Australia) John Fitzgerald (Sweden) Anders Järryd
- Score: 7–5, 7–6

Details
- Draw: 16
- Seeds: 4

Events
Singles	Doubles
← 1988 ·	Los Angeles Open	· 1990 →

John McEnroe and Mark Woodforde were the defending champions but only Woodforde competed that year with Patrick McEnroe.

McEnroe and Woodforde lost in the first round to Pieter Aldrich and Danie Visser.

Martin Davis and Tim Pawsat won in the final 7–5, 7–6 against John Fitzgerald and Anders Järryd.

== Seeds ==
1. (Australia) John Fitzgerald / (Sweden) Anders Järryd (final)
2. (United States) Rick Leach / (United States) Jim Pugh (semifinals)
3. (United States) Patrick McEnroe / (Australia) Mark Woodforde (first round)
4. (United States) Paul Annacone / (South Africa) Christo van Rensburg (first round)

== Draw ==
=== Key ===
- Q = Qualifier
- WC = Wild card
- LL = Lucky loser
- Alt = Alternate
- SE = Special exempt
- PR = Protected ranking
- ITF = ITF entry
- JE = Junior exempt
- w/o = Walkover
- r = Retired
- d = Defaulted
- SR = Special ranking

First round
1	(Australia) J Fitzgerald (Sweden) A Järryd	6	6	7
(United States) S Davis (United States) R Van't Hof	7	4	6
(United States) J Canter (Canada) G Michibata	6	3	4
WC	(United States) P Galbraith (United States) B Garrow	4	6	6
3	(United States) P McEnroe (Australia) M Woodforde	4	7	4
(South Africa) P Aldrich (South Africa) D Visser	6	6	6
(United States) K Curren (United States) D Pate	6	7
(Sweden) R Båthman (United States) R Reneberg	3	6
(United States) M Davis (United States) T Pawsat	6	6
(Australia) D Cahill (Australia) B Drewett	3	3
(New Zealand) K Evernden (Socialist Federal Republic of Yugoslavia) S Živojinović	2	7	6
4	(United States) P Annacone (South Africa) C van Rensburg	6	6	2
(United States) P Chamberlin (United States) T Wilkison	7	6
(United States) J Courier (United States) P Sampras	6	2
(Mexico) L Lavalle (Venezuela) N Pereira	4	6	6
2	(United States) R Leach (United States) J Pugh	6	4	7

Quarterfinals
1	(Australia) J Fitzgerald (Sweden) A Järryd	7	6
WC	(United States) P Galbraith (United States) B Garrow	6	1
(South Africa) P Aldrich (South Africa) D Visser	6	6
(United States) K Curren (United States) D Pate	3	4
(United States) M Davis (United States) T Pawsat	7	6
(New Zealand) K Evernden (Socialist Federal Republic of Yugoslavia) S Živojinović	6	4
(United States) P Chamberlin (United States) T Wilkison	4	4
2	(United States) R Leach (United States) J Pugh	6	6

Semifinals
1	(Australia) J Fitzgerald (Sweden) A Järryd	3	6	7
(South Africa) P Aldrich (South Africa) D Visser	6	3	5
(United States) M Davis (United States) T Pawsat	6	6
2	(United States) R Leach (United States) J Pugh	4	4

Final
1	(Australia) J Fitzgerald (Sweden) A Järryd	5	6
(United States) M Davis (United States) T Pawsat	7	7
