= 1988 Volvo Tennis Los Angeles – Singles =

Singles
- 1988 Volvo Tennis Los Angeles

Final
- Champion: (Sweden) Mikael Pernfors
- Runner-up: (United States) Andre Agassi
- Score: 6–2, 7–5

Details
- Draw: 32 (4Q / 3WC)
- Seeds: 8

Events
| Singles | Doubles |
| ← 1987 · | Los Angeles Open | · 1989 → |

David Pate was the defending champion, but lost in the quarterfinals to John McEnroe.

Mikael Pernfors won the title by defeating Andre Agassi 6–2, 7–5 in the final.

== Seeds ==
1. (United States) Andre Agassi (final)
2. (United States) Kevin Curren (semifinals)
3. (United States) John McEnroe (semifinals)
4. (Sweden) Mikael Pernfors (champion)
5. (United States) David Pate (quarterfinals)
6. (United States) Dan Goldie (second round)
7. (United States) Derrick Rostagno (first round)
8. (Australia) Mark Woodforde (quarterfinals)

== Draw ==
=== Key ===
- Q = Qualifier
- WC = Wild card
- LL = Lucky loser
- Alt = Alternate
- SE = Special exempt
- PR = Protected ranking
- ITF = ITF entry
- JE = Junior exempt
- w/o = Walkover
- r = Retired
- d = Defaulted
- SR = Special ranking

=== Finals ===
Semifinals
1 | (United States) Andre Agassi | 6 | 0 | 6
3 | (United States) John McEnroe | 4 | 6 | 4
4 | (Sweden) Mikael Pernfors | 7 | 6
2 | (United States) Kevin Curren | 6 | 4

Final
1 | (United States) Andre Agassi | 2 | 5
4 | (Sweden) Mikael Pernfors | 6 | 7

=== Top half ===
First round
1 | (United States) A Agassi | 6 | 6
(West Germany) C Saceanu | 2 | 2
(Mexico) J Lozano | 7 | 6
(South Africa) M Robertson | 6 | 4
(United States) J Kriek | 6 | 6 | 6
(West Germany) P Kühnen | 7 | 0 | 0
Q | (United States) R Van't Hof | 6 | 1
8 | (Australia) M Woodforde | 7 | 6
3 | (United States) J McEnroe | 6 | 6
(United States) P Annacone | 1 | 2
(United States) M Chang | 7 | 6
Q | (United States) M Freeman | 6 | 4
Q | (Australia) P Doohan | 6 | 3 | 3
WC | (United States) P Sampras | 3 | 6 | 6
(Sweden) P Lundgren | 3 | 2
5 | (United States) D Pate | 6 | 6

Second round
1 | (United States) A Agassi | 6 | 5 | 6
(Mexico) J Lozano | 4 | 7 | 2
(United States) J Kriek | 5 | 2
8 | (Australia) M Woodforde | 7 | 6
3 | (United States) J McEnroe | 6 | 6
(United States) M Chang | 2 | 4
WC | (United States) P Sampras | 3 | 6
5 | (United States) D Pate | 6 | 7

Quarterfinals
1 | (United States) A Agassi | 2 | 7 | 6
8 | (Australia) M Woodforde | 6 | 5 | 3
3 | (United States) J McEnroe | 6 | 6
5 | (United States) D Pate | 2 | 3

Semifinals
1 | (United States) A Agassi | 6 | 0 | 6
3 | (United States) J McEnroe | 4 | 6 | 4

=== Bottom half ===
First round
6 | (United States) D Goldie | 1 | 7 | 7
WC | (United States) R Weiss | 6 | 6 | 5
(United States) J Pugh | 6 | 6
Q | (United States) J Letts | 2 | 3
(United States) M Davis | 7 | 6
(United States) T Witsken | 6 | 1
(United States) T Wilkison | 6 | 3 | 6
4 | (Sweden) M Pernfors | 3 | 6 | 7
7 | (United States) D Rostagno | 3 | 4
WC | (United States) J Tarango | 6 | 6
(South Africa) C van Rensburg | 6 | 6
(United States) J Grabb | 2 | 2
(Peru) J Yzaga | 5 | 2
(United States) J Courier | 7 | 6
(United States) T Nelson | 7 | 4 | 4
2 | (United States) K Curren | 5 | 6 | 6

Second round
6 | (United States) D Goldie | 2 | 4
(United States) J Pugh | 6 | 6
(United States) M Davis | 4 | 7 | 4
4 | (Sweden) M Pernfors | 6 | 5 | 6
WC | (United States) J Tarango | 6 | 6
(South Africa) C van Rensburg | 3 | 3
(United States) J Courier | 1 | 3
2 | (United States) K Curren | 6 | 6

Quarterfinals
(United States) J Pugh | 3 | 5
4 | (Sweden) M Pernfors | 6 | 7
WC | (United States) J Tarango | 5 | 7 | 3
2 | (United States) K Curren | 7 | 6 | 6

Semifinals
4 | (Sweden) M Pernfors | 7 | 6
2 | (United States) K Curren | 6 | 4
