= 1992 Volvo San Francisco – Doubles =

Doubles
- 1992 Volvo San Francisco

Final
- Champions: (United States) Jim Grabb (United States) Richey Reneberg
- Runners-up: (South Africa) Pieter Aldrich (South Africa) Danie Visser
- Score: 6–4, 7–5

Details
- Draw: 16
- Seeds: 4

Events
Singles	Doubles
← 1991 ·	Pacific Coast Championships	· 1993 →

Wally Masur and Jason Stoltenberg were the defending champions, but competed this year with different partners. Masur teamed up with Mark Kratzmann and lost in the semifinals to Jim Grabb and Richey Reneberg, while Stoltenberg teamed up with Todd Nelson and lost in quarterfinals to Pieter Aldrich and Danie Visser.

Jim Grabb and Richey Reneberg won the title by defeating Pieter Aldrich and Danie Visser 6–4, 7–5 in the final.

== Seeds ==
1. (United States) Patrick Galbraith / (United States) Todd Witsken (first round)
2. (United States) Jim Grabb / (United States) Richey Reneberg (champions)
3. (United States) Kevin Curren / (South Africa) Gary Muller (quarterfinals)
4. (Netherlands) Michiel Schapers / (Czechoslovakia) Daniel Vacek (first round)

== Draw ==
=== Key ===
- Q = Qualifier
- WC = Wild card
- LL = Lucky loser
- Alt = Alternate
- SE = Special exempt
- PR = Protected ranking
- ITF = ITF entry
- JE = Junior exempt
- w/o = Walkover
- r = Retired
- d = Defaulted
- SR = Special ranking

=== Draw ===
First round
1	(United States) P Galbraith (United States) T Witsken	6	4	2
Q	(United States) D Randall (United States) T Scherman	3	6	6
(Sweden) J Gunnarsson (Sweden) P Lundgren	6	6	6
WC	(United States) C Chang (United States) M Chang	3	7	4
4	(Netherlands) M Schapers (Czechoslovakia) D Vacek	6	6	5
(South Africa) P Aldrich (South Africa) D Visser	4	7	7
(United States) T Nelson (Australia) J Stoltenberg	6	7	6
(United States) S DeVries (United States) B Pearce	7	6	4
WC	(Australia) M Kratzmann (Australia) W Masur	7	7
(United States) J Courier (United States) B Gilbert	5	6
(United States) K Kinnear (United States) S Salumaa	3	4
3	(United States) K Curren (South Africa) G Muller	6	6
(United States) G Layendecker (South Africa) B Talbot	6	3	7
(United States) P Annacone (United States) J Pugh	3	6	6
(United States) B Garrow (Australia) M Woodforde	4	4
2	(United States) J Grabb (United States) R Reneberg	6	6

Quarterfinals
Q	(United States) D Randall (United States) T Scherman	3	4
(Sweden) J Gunnarsson (Sweden) P Lundgren	6	6
(South Africa) P Aldrich (South Africa) D Visser	6	7
(United States) T Nelson (Australia) J Stoltenberg	4	6
WC	(Australia) M Kratzmann (Australia) W Masur	3	6	6
3	(United States) K Curren (South Africa) G Muller	6	3	4
(United States) G Layendecker (South Africa) B Talbot	2	2
2	(United States) J Grabb (United States) R Reneberg	6	6

Semifinals
(Sweden) J Gunnarsson (Sweden) P Lundgren	6	6
(South Africa) P Aldrich (South Africa) D Visser	7	7
WC	(Australia) M Kratzmann (Australia) W Masur	2	4
2	(United States) J Grabb (United States) R Reneberg	6	6

Final
(South Africa) P Aldrich (South Africa) D Visser	4	5
2	(United States) J Grabb (United States) R Reneberg	6	7
