= 1990 Volvo San Francisco – Singles =

Singles
- 1990 Volvo San Francisco

Final
- Champion: (United States) Andre Agassi
- Runner-up: (United States) Todd Witsken
- Score: 6–1, 6–3

Details
- Draw: 32 (4Q / 3WC)
- Seeds: 8

Events
Singles	Doubles
← 1989 ·	Pacific Coast Championships	· 1991 →

Brad Gilbert was the defending champion, but lost in the first round to Gary Muller.

Andre Agassi won the title by defeating Todd Witsken 6–1, 6–3 in the final.

== Seeds ==
1. (United States) Brad Gilbert (first round)
2. (United States) Andre Agassi (champion)
3. (United States) Kevin Curren (first round)
4. (South Africa) Christo van Rensburg (quarterfinals)
5. (United States) Jim Grabb (semifinals)
6. (United States) Scott Davis (second round)
7. (United States) Richey Reneberg (quarterfinals)
8. (United States) Paul Annacone (quarterfinals)

== Draw ==
=== Key ===
- Q = Qualifier
- WC = Wild card
- LL = Lucky loser
- Alt = Alternate
- SE = Special exempt
- PR = Protected ranking
- ITF = ITF entry
- JE = Junior exempt
- w/o = Walkover
- r = Retired
- d = Defaulted
- SR = Special ranking

=== Finals ===
Semifinals
(United States) Todd Witsken	6	7^{7}
(United States) Joey Rive	4	6^{4}
5	(United States) Jim Grabb	2	2
2	(United States) Andre Agassi	6	6

Final
(United States) Todd Witsken	1	3
2	(United States) Andre Agassi	6	6

=== Top half ===
First round
1	(United States) B Gilbert	4	6^{5}
(South Africa) G Muller	6	7^{7}
(United States) R Seguso	2	4
(United States) T Witsken	6	6
WC	(West Germany) A Hombrecher	6^{5}	6	3
Q	(United States) C Garner	7^{7}	3	6
(United States) L Shiras	6^{5}	3
7	(United States) R Reneberg	7^{7}	6
3	(United States) K Curren	2	5
(United States) J Rive	6	7
(United States) L Duncan	7	5	7
(New Zealand) K Evernden	5	7	5
(United States) J Arias	6	6
(Czechoslovakia) M Vajda	4	3
(United States) G Layendecker	2	6	3
6	(United States) S Davis	6	3	6

Second round
(South Africa) G Muller	4	3
(United States) T Witsken	6	6
Q	(United States) C Garner	1	3
7	(United States) R Reneberg	6	6
(United States) J Rive	4	6	6
(United States) L Duncan	6	3	3
(United States) J Arias	6	7^{7}
6	(United States) S Davis	3	6^{0}

Quarterfinals
(United States) T Witsken	7^{7}	6
7	(United States) R Reneberg	6^{5}	4
(United States) J Rive	2	6	6
(United States) J Arias	6	4	2

Semifinals
(United States) T Witsken	6	7^{7}
(United States) J Rive	4	6^{4}

=== Bottom half ===
First round
5	(United States) J Grabb	6	7^{9}
(United States) J Brown	3	6^{7}
(United States) D Rostagno	7	3
(United States) P Chamberlin	5	0^{r}
Q	(Australia) D Macpherson	2	4
(United States) K Jones	6	6
WC	(United States) M Davis	4	7^{7}	3
4	(South Africa) C van Rensburg	6	6^{4}	6
8	(United States) P Annacone	7^{7}	7^{7}
Q	(United States) D Cassidy	6^{5}	6^{5}
(United States) T Wilkison	6^{3}	6	7^{7}
Q	(United States) P McEnroe	7^{7}	1	6^{3}
WC	(United States) J Stark	4	7	2
(United States) D Goldie	6	5	6
(India) R Krishnan	2	7^{7}	0
2	(United States) A Agassi	6	6^{5}	6

Second round
5	(United States) J Grabb	6	6^{4}	6
(United States) D Rostagno	2	7^{7}	4
(United States) K Jones	2	6	5
4	(South Africa) C van Rensburg	6	3	7
8	(United States) P Annacone	6	6
(United States) T Wilkison	2	2
(United States) D Goldie	6	0	1
2	(United States) A Agassi	2	6	6

Quarterfinals
5	(United States) J Grabb	4	6	7^{8}
4	(South Africa) C van Rensburg	6	2	6^{6}
8	(United States) P Annacone	4	2
2	(United States) A Agassi	6	6

Semifinals
5	(United States) J Grabb	2	2
2	(United States) A Agassi	6	6
