= 1992 Volvo San Francisco =

- Date: February 3–9
- Edition: 104th
- Category: World Series
- Draw: 32S / 16D
- Prize money: $225,000
- Surface: Hard / indoor
- Location: San Francisco, U.S.
- Venue: San Francisco Civic Auditorium

Champions

Singles
- (United States) Michael Chang

Doubles
- (United States) Jim Grabb / (United States) Richey Reneberg
← 1991 ·	Pacific Coast Championships	· 1993 →

The 1992 Volvo San Francisco was a men's tennis tournament played on indoor hard courts at the San Francisco Civic Auditorium in San Francisco, California in the United States and was part of the World Series of the 1992 ATP Tour. It was the 104th edition of the tournament and was held from February 3 through February 9, 1992. Second-seeded Michael Chang won the singles title and earned $33,800 first-prize money. With the points that first-seeded runner-up Jim Courier earned at the tournament he became the new No. 1 ranked player in the world when the Association of Tennis Professionals (ATP) published their rankings on February 10, 1992.

== Finals ==
=== Singles ===
(United States) Michael Chang defeated (United States) Jim Courier 6–3, 6–3

- It was Chang's 1st singles title of the year and the 6th of his career.

=== Doubles ===
(United States) Jim Grabb / (United States) Richey Reneberg defeated (South Africa) Pieter Aldrich / (South Africa) Danie Visser 6–4, 7–5
