= 1989 Los Angeles Open =

Tennis tournament

- Date: September 18–24
- Edition: 63rd
- Category: Grand Prix circuit
- Draw: 32S / 16D
- Prize money: $297,500
- Surface: Hard / outdoor
- Location: Los Angeles, CA, U.S.
- Venue: Los Angeles Tennis Center

Champions

Singles
- (United States) Aaron Krickstein

Doubles
- (United States) Martin Davis / (United States) Tim Pawsat
← 1988 ·	Los Angeles Open	· 1990 →

The 1989 Los Angeles Open was a men's tennis tournament played on outdoor hard courts at the Los Angeles Tennis Center in Los Angeles, California, United States as part of the 1989 Nabisco Grand Prix. It was the 63rd edition of the tournament and was held from September 18 through September 24, 1989. Fifth-seeded Aaron Krickstein won the singles title.

== Finals ==
=== Singles ===
(United States) Aaron Krickstein defeated (United States) Michael Chang 2–6, 6–4, 6–2

- It was Krickstein's 2nd title of the year and the 6th of his career.

=== Doubles ===
(United States) Martin Davis / (United States) Tim Pawsat defeated (Australia) John Fitzgerald / (Sweden) Anders Järryd 7–5, 7–6

- It was Davis' only title of the year and the 8th of his career. It was Pawsat's 2nd title of the year and the 4th of his career.
