= 1989 Los Angeles Open – Singles =

Singles
- 1989 Los Angeles Open

Final
- Champion: (United States) Aaron Krickstein
- Runner-up: (United States) Michael Chang
- Score: 2–6, 6–4, 6–2

Details
- Draw: 32 (4Q / 3WC)
- Seeds: 8

Events
Singles	Doubles
← 1988 ·	Los Angeles Open	· 1990 →

Mikael Pernfors was the defending champion but lost in the quarterfinals to Brad Gilbert.

Aaron Krickstein won in the final 2–6, 6–4, 6–2 against Michael Chang.

== Seeds ==
A champion seed is indicated in bold text while text in italics indicates the round in which that seed was eliminated.

1. (United States) Michael Chang (final)
2. (United States) Brad Gilbert (semifinals)
3. (United States) Tim Mayotte (first round)
4. (Sweden) Mats Wilander (first round)
5. (United States) **Aaron Krickstein (champion)**
6. (United States) Kevin Curren (quarterfinals)
7. (South Africa) Christo van Rensburg (first round)
8. (Sweden) Mikael Pernfors (quarterfinals)

== Draw ==
=== Key ===
- Q = Qualifier
- WC = Wild card
- LL = Lucky loser
- Alt = Alternate
- SE = Special exempt
- PR = Protected ranking
- ITF = ITF entry
- JE = Junior exempt
- w/o = Walkover
- r = Retired
- d = Defaulted
- SR = Special ranking

First round
1	(United States) **M Chang**	**7**	**6**
WC	(United States) P Sampras	6	0
Q	(United States) **K Thorne**	2	**6**	**6**
(Sweden) P Lundgren	**6**	3	3
Q	(United States) **J Arias**	**6**	**6**
Q	(United States) M Anger	2	4
(Australia) **D Cahill**	1	**7**	**6**
7	(South Africa) C van Rensburg	**6**	5	1
4	(Sweden) M Wilander	**7**	5	2
(United States) **D Rostagno**	6	**7**	**6**
(United States) **S Davis**	**6**	**6**
Q	(Canada) G Michibata	3	2
(United States) **D Wheaton**	**7**	**6**
(United States) P Annacone	6	1
(United States) P Chamberlin	**6**	1	2
6	(United States) **K Curren**	1	**6**	**6**
5	(United States) **A Krickstein**	**7**	**6**
(Australia) J Fitzgerald	5	2
(New Zealand) K Evernden	6	**6**	2
(Haiti) **R Agénor**	**7**	4	**6**
(South Africa) **P Aldrich**	4	**6**	**6**
(United States) J Courier	**6**	3	1
(Canada) **A Sznajder**	**6**	3	**7**
3	(United States) T Mayotte	4	**6**	5
8	(Sweden) **M Pernfors**	4	**6**	**6**
(Australia) M Woodforde	**6**	3	4
WC	(Socialist Federal Republic of Yugoslavia) **S Živojinović**	**6**	2	**7**
(United States) J Pugh	2	**6**	6
(Sweden) **A Järryd**	**7**	**6**
(United States) R Reneberg	6	2
WC	(United States) D Pate	5	2
2	(United States) **B Gilbert**	**7**	**6**

Second round
1	(United States) **M Chang**	**6**	**6**
Q	(United States) K Thorne	1	1
Q	(United States) J Arias	3	2
(Australia) **D Cahill**	**6**	**6**
(United States) D Rostagno	**7**	6	2
(United States) **S Davis**	6	**7**	**6**
(United States) D Wheaton	**6**	3	6
6	(United States) **K Curren**	3	**6**	**7**
5	(United States) **A Krickstein**	**6**	**6**
(Haiti) R Agénor	1	4
(South Africa) P Aldrich	1	4
(Canada) **A Sznajder**	**6**	**6**
8	(Sweden) **M Pernfors**	**6**	**6**
WC	(Socialist Federal Republic of Yugoslavia) S Živojinović	3	0
(Sweden) A Järryd	2	6
2	(United States) **B Gilbert**	**6**	**7**

Quarterfinals
1	(United States) **M Chang**	**6**	**6**
(Australia) D Cahill	1	3
(United States) **S Davis**	3	**7**	**7**
6	(United States) K Curren	**6**	6	5
5	(United States) **A Krickstein**	**6**	**6**
(Canada) A Sznajder	0	3
8	(Sweden) M Pernfors	4	1
2	(United States) **B Gilbert**	**6**	**6**

Semifinals
1	(United States) **M Chang**	**6**	**6**
(United States) S Davis	4	4
5	(United States) **A Krickstein**	1	**7**	**6**
2	(United States) B Gilbert	**6**	6	2

Final
1	(United States) Michael Chang	**6**	4	2
5	(United States) **Aaron Krickstein**	2	**6**	**6**
