= 1995 Tokyo Indoor – Singles =

Singles
- 1995 Tokyo Indoor

Final
- Champion: (United States) Michael Chang
- Runner-up: (Australia) Mark Philippoussis
- Score: 6–3, 6–4

Details
- Draw: 48
- Seeds: 8

Events
Singles	Doubles
← 1994 ·	Tokyo Indoor

The 1995 Tokyo Indoor Singles was a tennis tournament played on indoor carpet courts.

Goran Ivanišević was the defending champion, but lost in the quarterfinals this year

Michael Chang won the title, defeating Mark Philippoussis in the final, 6–3, 6–4.

== Seeds ==
1. (United States) Michael Chang (champion)
2. (Croatia) Goran Ivanišević (quarterfinals)
3. (Spain) Sergi Bruguera (third round)
4. (Netherlands) Richard Krajicek (quarterfinals)
5. (Sweden) Stefan Edberg (second round)
6. (United States) Todd Martin (third round)
7. (Netherlands) Paul Haarhuis (second round)
8. (Netherlands) Jacco Eltingh (third round)
9. (Russia) Alexander Volkov (quarterfinals)
10. (Chile) Marcelo Ríos (second round)
11. (New Zealand) Brett Steven (third round)
12. (Australia) Mark Woodforde (second round)
13. (Italy) Renzo Furlan (third round)
14. (Zimbabwe) Byron Black (quarterfinals)
15. (United States) Patrick McEnroe (second round)
16. (United States) Aaron Krickstein (second round)

== Draw ==
=== Key ===
- Q = Qualifier
- WC = Wild card
- LL = Lucky loser
- Alt = Alternate
- SE = Special exempt
- PR = Protected ranking
- ITF = ITF entry
- JE = Junior exempt
- w/o = Walkover
- r = Retired
- d = Defaulted
- SR = Special ranking

=== Finals ===
Semifinals
1	(United States) Michael Chang	5	6	6
(Sweden) Henrik Holm	7	4	4
(Australia) Mark Philippoussis	6	4	6
(Germany) Hendrik Dreekmann	4	6	2

Final
1	(United States) Michael Chang	6	6
(Australia) Mark Philippoussis	3	4

=== Top half ===
==== Section 1 ====
First round
(Belgium) D Norman	6	6
WC	(Japan) G Motomura	3	4
(Switzerland) J Hlasek	7^{9}	3	6
Q	(Canada) A Chang	6^{7}	6	3
Q	(Netherlands) F Wibier	7^{11}	6^{5}	6
(United States) M Joyce	6^{9}	7^{7}	4
(United States) T Ho	6	6
(Kenya) P Wekesa	1	1

Second round
1	(United States) M Chang	6	6
(Belgium) D Norman	3	4
(Switzerland) J Hlasek	7^{7}	3	7^{7}
15	(United States) P McEnroe	6^{2}	6	6^{3}
9	(Russia) A Volkov	7	6
Q	(Netherlands) F Wibier	5	2
(United States) T Ho	6	3	2
8	(Netherlands) J Eltingh	4	6	6

Third round
1	(United States) M Chang	6	6
(Switzerland) J Hlasek	1	3
9	(Russia) A Volkov	3	6	7
8	(Netherlands) J Eltingh	6	4	5

Quarterfinals
1	(United States) M Chang	6	6
9	(Russia) A Volkov	2	0

==== Section 2 ====
First round
(India) L Paes	6	6
WC	(Japan) K Miyachi	2	4
(Canada) S Lareau	1	7^{9}	4
LL	(Australia) M Tebbutt	6	6^{7}	6
(Sweden) H Holm	3	7^{7}	6
(Australia) J Morgan	6	6^{2}	3
(United States) B Shelton	7^{9}	6^{2}	5
(United Kingdom) J Bates	6^{7}	7^{7}	7

Second round
3	(Spain) S Bruguera	6	6
(India) L Paes	3	0
LL	(Australia) M Tebbutt	3	6^{4}
14	(Zimbabwe) B Black	6	7^{7}
12	(Australia) M Woodforde	6	1	6^{3}
(Sweden) H Holm	4	6	7^{7}
(United Kingdom) J Bates	6	4	4
6	(United States) T Martin	3	6	6

Third round
3	(Spain) S Bruguera	1	6^{5}
14	(Zimbabwe) B Black	6	7^{7}
(Sweden) H Holm	6	3	6
6	(United States) T Martin	2	6	4

Quarterfinals
14	(Zimbabwe) B Black	3	7^{10}	1
(Sweden) H Holm	6	6^{8}	6

=== Bottom half ===
==== Section 3 ====
First round
(Australia) M Philippoussis	6	6
(Germany) A Mronz	3	3
(Italy) C Caratti	6	7^{7}
(Australia) S Draper	3	6^{2}
Q	(Australia) S Stolle	6	6
(Italy) G Pozzi	3	4
WC	(Japan) H Kaneko	7	1	5
Q	(United States) A O'Brien	5	6	7

Second round
5	(Sweden) S Edberg	0	2
(Australia) M Philippoussis	6	6
(Italy) C Caratti	4	3
11	(New Zealand) B Steven	6	6
13	(Italy) R Furlan	6	3	6
Q	(Australia) S Stolle	2	6	1
Q	(United States) A O'Brien	5	6^{4}
4	(Netherlands) R Krajicek	7	7^{7}

Third round
(Australia) M Philippoussis	7^{7}	6
11	(New Zealand) B Steven	6^{4}	3
13	(Italy) R Furlan	3	2
4	(Netherlands) R Krajicek	6	6

Quarterfinals
(Australia) M Philippoussis	6^{4}	7^{7}	6
4	(Netherlands) R Krajicek	7^{7}	6^{5}	3

==== Section 4 ====
First round
(Japan) S Matsuoka	3	3
(Germany) H Dreekmann	6	6
(United States) J Stark	6	6
(Germany) L Rehmann	3	2
(Denmark) K Carlsen	7	6
Q	(United Kingdom) D Sapsford	5	1
Q	(United States) L Gloria	6	6
WC	(Japan) T Suzuki	4	2

Second round
7	(Netherlands) P Haarhuis	7^{7}	4	2
(Germany) H Dreekmann	6^{5}	6	6
(United States) J Stark	6^{6}	6	6
10	(Chile) M Ríos	7^{8}	4	4
16	(United States) A Krickstein	4	0
(Denmark) K Carlsen	6	6
Q	(United States) L Gloria	7^{7}	4	6^{7}
2	(Croatia) G Ivanišević	6^{2}	6	7^{9}

Third round
(Germany) H Dreekmann	4	6	6
(United States) J Stark	6	3	4
(Denmark) K Carlsen	4	7^{7}	3
2	(Croatia) G Ivanišević	6	6^{2}	6

Quarterfinals
(Germany) H Dreekmann	7^{7}	7^{7}
2	(Croatia) G Ivanišević	6^{2}	6^{5}
