= 1990 Volvo Tennis Los Angeles =

- Date: July 30 – August 5
- Edition: 64th
- Category: World Series
- Draw: 32S / 16D
- Prize money: $225,000
- Surface: Hard / outdoor
- Location: Los Angeles, CA, U.S.
- Venue: Los Angeles Tennis Center

Champions

Singles
- (Sweden) Stefan Edberg

Doubles
- (United States) Scott Davis / (United States) David Pate
← 1989 ·	Los Angeles Open	· 1991 →

The 1990 Volvo Tennis Los Angeles was a men's tennis tournament played on outdoor hard courts at the Los Angeles Tennis Center in Los Angeles, California in the United States that was part of the World Series of the 1990 ATP Tour. It was the 64th edition of the tournament and was held from July 30 through August 5, 1990. First-seeded Stefan Edberg, who had been a runner-up in 1985, 1986 and 1987, won the singles title and earned $32,400 first-prize money.

== Finals ==
=== Singles ===
(Sweden) Stefan Edberg defeated (United States) Michael Chang 7–6^{(7–4)}, 2–6, 7–6^{(7–3)}

- It was Edberg's 4th singles title of the year and the 24th of his career.

=== Doubles ===
(United States) Scott Davis / (United States) David Pate defeated (Sweden) Peter Lundgren / (Kenya) Paul Wekesa 3–6, 6–1, 6–3
