= 1988 Transamerica Open – Doubles =

Doubles
- 1988 Transamerica Open

Final
- Champions: (United States) John McEnroe (Australia) Mark Woodforde
- Runners-up: (United States) Scott Davis (United States) Tim Wilkison
- Score: 6–4, 7–6

Details
- Draw: 16
- Seeds: 4

Events
Singles	Doubles
← 1987 ·	Pacific Coast Championships	· 1989 →

Jim Grabb and Patrick McEnroe were the defending champions, but lost in the first round to Scott Davis and Tim Wilkison.

John McEnroe and Mark Woodforde won the title by defeating Davis and Wilkison 6–4, 7–6 in the final.

== Seeds ==
1. (United States) Rick Leach / (United States) Jim Pugh (semifinals)
2. (South Africa) Pieter Aldrich / (South Africa) Danie Visser (quarterfinals)
3. (United States) Jim Grabb / (United States) Patrick McEnroe (first round)
4. (United States) David Pate / (South Africa) Christo van Rensburg (first round)

== Draw ==
=== Key ===
- Q = Qualifier
- WC = Wild card
- LL = Lucky loser
- Alt = Alternate
- SE = Special exempt
- PR = Protected ranking
- ITF = ITF entry
- JE = Junior exempt
- w/o = Walkover
- r = Retired
- d = Defaulted
- SR = Special ranking

=== Draw ===
First round
1	(United States) R Leach (United States) J Pugh	6	6
(South Africa) E Edwards (South Africa) G Muller	3	2
(United States) P Annacone (United States) J Kriek	6	7
(West Germany) P Kühnen (United States) T Nelson	4	6
4	(United States) D Pate (South Africa) C van Rensburg	6	6
(United States) J McEnroe (Australia) M Woodforde	7	7
(United States) M De Palmer (Australia) B Dyke	4	6	1
(United States) K Jones (Sweden) P Lundgren	6	3	6
(United States) A Kohlberg (United States) R Van't Hof	6	3	2
(United States) B Pearce (United States) B Willenborg	4	6	6
(United States) S Davis (United States) T Wilkison	1	7	6
3	(United States) J Grabb (United States) P McEnroe	6	6	4
(United States) D Goldie (Mexico) J Lozano	6	6
(United States) E Korita (United States) J Levine	2	4
(United States) M Davis (United States) T Pawsat	3	6	6
2	(South Africa) P Aldrich (South Africa) D Visser	6	3	7

Quarterfinals
1	(United States) R Leach (United States) J Pugh	6	4	7
(United States) P Annacone (United States) J Kriek	3	6	6
(United States) J McEnroe (Australia) M Woodforde	6	7
(United States) K Jones (Sweden) P Lundgren	4	5
(United States) B Pearce (United States) B Willenborg	4	1
(United States) S Davis (United States) T Wilkison	6	6
(United States) D Goldie (Mexico) J Lozano	6	6	6
2	(South Africa) P Aldrich (South Africa) D Visser	7	3	4

Semifinals
1	(United States) R Leach (United States) J Pugh	6	2
(United States) J McEnroe (Australia) M Woodforde	7	6
(United States) S Davis (United States) T Wilkison	7	7
(United States) D Goldie (Mexico) J Lozano	6	6

Final
(United States) J McEnroe (Australia) M Woodforde	6	7
(United States) S Davis (United States) T Wilkison	4	6
