= 1990 Volvo San Francisco – Doubles =

Doubles
- 1990 Volvo San Francisco

Final
- Champions: (United States) Kelly Jones (United States) Robert Van't Hof
- Runners-up: (United States) Glenn Layendecker (United States) Richey Reneberg
- Score: 2–6, 7–6, 6–3

Details
- Draw: 16
- Seeds: 4

Events
Singles	Doubles
← 1989 ·	Pacific Coast Championships	· 1991 →

Pieter Aldrich and Danie Visser were the defending champions, but decided to not compete this year after winning the Australian Open 2 weeks earlier.

Kelly Jones and Robert Van't Hof won the title by defeating Glenn Layendecker and Richey Reneberg 2–6, 7–6, 6–3 in the final.

== Seeds ==
1. (United States) Jim Grabb / (United States) Patrick McEnroe (first round)
2. (United States) Ken Flach / (United States) Robert Seguso (first round)
3. (United States) Paul Annacone / (South Africa) Christo van Rensburg (first round)
4. (United States) Scott Davis / (United States) David Pate (quarterfinals)

== Draw ==
=== Key ===
- Q = Qualifier
- WC = Wild card
- LL = Lucky loser
- Alt = Alternate
- SE = Special exempt
- PR = Protected ranking
- ITF = ITF entry
- JE = Junior exempt
- w/o = Walkover
- r = Retired
- d = Defaulted
- SR = Special ranking

=== Draw ===
First round
1	(United States) J Grabb (United States) P McEnroe	6	6^{3}	5
(United States) G Layendecker (United States) R Reneberg	4	7^{7}	7
(Venezuela) A Mora (United States) J Schor	6^{5}	6^{6}
(United States) M Davis (New Zealand) K Evernden	7^{7}	7^{8}
4	(United States) S Davis (United States) D Pate	6	3	7^{7}
(United States) P Galbraith (Australia) D Macpherson	3	6	6^{0}
(United States) P Chamberlin (United States) T Wilkison	6	1	4
(United States) D Goldie (United States) R Leach	3	6	6
(United States) A Agassi (United States) M Blackman	4	6	7^{12}
(United States) S DeVries (United States) R Matuszewski	6	3	6^{10}
(United States) K Jones (United States) R Van't Hof	6	6
3	(United States) P Annacone (South Africa) C van Rensburg	3	4
(Mexico) J Lozano (United States) T Witsken	4	6
(United States) J Rive (Czechoslovakia) M Vajda	6	7
(United Kingdom) N Broad (South Africa) G Muller	7^{7}	4	7^{7}
2	(United States) K Flach (United States) R Seguso	6^{2}	6	6^{3}

Quarterfinals
(United States) G Layendecker (United States) R Reneberg	7	6
(United States) M Davis (New Zealand) K Evernden	5	4
4	(United States) S Davis (United States) D Pate	4	6	5
(United States) D Goldie (United States) R Leach	6	4	7
(United States) A Agassi (United States) M Blackman	2	3
(United States) K Jones (United States) R Van't Hof	6	6
(United States) J Rive (Czechoslovakia) M Vajda	5	3
(United Kingdom) N Broad (South Africa) G Muller	7	6

Semifinals
(United States) G Layendecker (United States) R Reneberg	4	7^{7}	6
(United States) D Goldie (United States) R Leach	6	6^{5}	4
(United States) K Jones (United States) R Van't Hof	7^{7}	7^{8}
(United Kingdom) N Broad (South Africa) G Muller	6^{5}	6^{6}

Final
(United States) G Layendecker (United States) R Reneberg	6	6^{3}	3
(United States) K Jones (United States) R Van't Hof	2	7^{7}	6
