= 1994 Tokyo Indoor – Doubles =

Doubles
- 1994 Tokyo Indoor
- 1993 Champions: (Canada) Grant Connell; (United States) Patrick Galbraith

Final
- Champions: (Canada) Grant Connell; (United States) Patrick Galbraith
- Runners-up: (Zimbabwe) Byron Black; (United States) Jonathan Stark
- Score: 6–3, 3–6, 6–4

Details
- Draw: 24
- Seeds: 8

Events
| Singles | Doubles |
- Tokyo Indoor

Grant Connell and Patrick Galbraith were the defending champions.

Connell and Galbraith successfully their title, defeating Byron Black and Jonathan Stark 6–3, 3–6, 6–4 in the final.

== Seeds ==
All seeds receive a bye into the second round.

1. (Netherlands) Jacco Eltingh / (Netherlands) Paul Haarhuis (second round)
2. (Canada) Grant Connell / (United States) Patrick Galbraith (champions)
3. (Zimbabwe) Byron Black / (United States) Jonathan Stark (final)
4. (Australia) Todd Woodbridge / (Australia) Mark Woodforde (second round)
5. (South Africa) David Adams / (Russia) Andrei Olhovskiy (quarterfinals)
6. (Sweden) Henrik Holm / (Sweden) Anders Järryd (quarterfinals)
7. (United States) Alex O'Brien / (Australia) Sandon Stolle (quarterfinals)
8. (United States) Jim Grabb / (United States) Richey Reneberg (quarterfinals)

== Draw ==
Key

- Q = Qualifier
- WC = Wild card
- LL = Lucky loser
- Alt = Alternate
- ITF = ITF entry
- PR = Protected ranking
- SR = Special ranking
- SE = Special exempt
- JE = Junior exempt
- JR = Junior Accelerator Programme entrant
- CO = College Accelerator Programme entrant
- NG = Next Gen Accelerator Program entrant
- w/o = Walkover
- r = Retired
- d = Defaulted

=== Finals ===
Semifinals

Final

WC
- (Sweden) Stefan Edberg
- (Japan) Shuzo Matsuoka
6
6

3
- (Zimbabwe) Byron Black
- (United States) Jonathan Stark
7
7

3
- (Zimbabwe) Byron Black
- (United States) Jonathan Stark
3
6
4

2
- (Canada) Grant Connell
- (United States) Patrick Galbraith
6
3
6

- (Australia) Mark Kratzmann
- (New Zealand) Brett Steven
4
2

2
- (Canada) Grant Connell
- (United States) Patrick Galbraith
6
6

=== Top half ===
First round

Second round

Quarterfinals

Semifinals

1
- (Netherlands) J Eltingh
- (Netherlands) P Haarhuis
5
6

WC
- (Sweden) S Edberg
- (Japan) S Matsuoka
6
6

WC
- (Sweden) S Edberg
- (Japan) S Matsuoka
7
7

- (United States) B Devening
- (South Africa) C van Rensburg
4
2

WC
- (Sweden) S Edberg
- (Japan) S Matsuoka
6
6

- (Australia) P Kilderry
- (Australia) A Kratzmann
7
6

8
- (United States) J Grabb
- (United States) R Reneberg
3
4

WC
- (Japan) T Mori
- (Japan) M Takada
6
2

- (Australia) P Kilderry
- (Australia) A Kratzmann
2
4

8
- (United States) J Grabb
- (United States) R Reneberg
6
6

WC
- (Sweden) S Edberg
- (Japan) S Matsuoka
6
6

3
- (Zimbabwe) B Black
- (United States) J Stark
7
7

3
- (Zimbabwe) B Black
- (United States) J Stark
6
7
6

WC
- (South Korea) B-s Kim
- (Japan) H Nakano
2
3

- (Germany) A Mronz
- (Australia) M Tebbutt
7
5
4

- (Germany) A Mronz
- (Australia) M Tebbutt
6
6

3
- (Zimbabwe) B Black
- (United States) J Stark
3
6
6

- (United States) T Kronemann
- (Australia) D Macpherson
6
3

5
- (South Africa) D Adams
- (Russia) A Olhovskiy
6
2
2

- (Sweden) N Kulti
- (Sweden) L-A Wahlgren
7
6

- (Sweden) N Kulti
- (Sweden) L-A Wahlgren
2
1

5
- (South Africa) D Adams
- (Russia) A Olhovskiy
6
6

=== Bottom half ===
First round

Second round

Quarterfinals

Semifinals

6
- (Sweden) H Holm
- (Sweden) A Järryd
7
6

- (United States) S Davis
- (United States) R Leach
6
7

- (United States) S Davis
- (United States) R Leach
5
4

WC
- (Netherlands) R Krajicek
- (United States) T Martin
3
6

6
- (Sweden) H Holm
- (Sweden) A Järryd
4
4

- (Australia) M Kratzmann
- (New Zealand) B Steven
7
6

- (Australia) M Kratzmann
- (New Zealand) B Steven
6
6

Q
- (Australia) N Borwick
- (United States) R Matuszewski
6
4

- (Australia) M Kratzmann
- (New Zealand) B Steven
7
7

4
- (Australia) T Woodbridge
- (Australia) M Woodforde
6
6

- (Australia) M Kratzmann
- (New Zealand) B Steven
4
2

2
- (Canada) G Connell
- (United States) P Galbraith
6
6

7
- (United States) A O'Brien
- (Australia) S Stolle
4
7
7

- (United States) K Kinnear
- (United States) D Wheaton
6
6

- (United States) K Kinnear
- (United States) D Wheaton
6
6
6

- (Australia) J Fitzgerald
- (Australia) P Rafter
2
3

7
- (United States) A O'Brien
- (Australia) S Stolle
0
3

- (Australia) J Eagle
- (Australia) A Florent
4
7
6

2
- (Canada) G Connell
- (United States) P Galbraith
6
6

- (Venezuela) N Pereira
- (Venezuela) M Ruah
6
5
1

- (Australia) J Eagle
- (Australia) A Florent
6
6

2
- (Canada) G Connell
- (United States) P Galbraith
7
7
