= 1990 Volvo San Francisco =

Tennis tournament

- Date: February 5–11
- Edition: 102nd
- Category: ATP World Series, Free Week
- Draw: 32S / 16D
- Prize money: $250,000
- Surface: Carpet / indoor
- Location: San Francisco, U.S.
- Venue: San Francisco Civic Auditorium

Champions

Singles
- (United States) Andre Agassi

Doubles
- (United States) Kelly Jones / (United States) Robert Van't Hof
← 1989 ·	Volvo San Francisco	· 1991 →

The 1990 Volvo San Francisco (known as such in 1990 for sponsorship reasons) was a tennis tournament played on indoor carpet courts. It was the 102nd edition of the event known that year as the Volvo San Francisco, and part of the ATP World Series, Free Week series of the 1990 ATP Tour. It took place at the San Francisco Civic Auditorium in San Francisco, United States, from February 5 through February 11, 1990. Second-seeded Andre Agassi won the singles title.

== Finals ==
=== Singles ===
(United States) Andre Agassi defeated (United States) Todd Witsken, 6–1, 6–3

- It was Agassi's 1st singles title of the year and the 9th of his career.

=== Doubles ===
(United States) Kelly Jones / (United States) Robert Van't Hof defeated (United States) Glenn Layendecker / (United States) Richey Reneberg, 2–6, 7–6, 6–3

- It was Jones' second doubles title of the year, and the fourth of his career.
- It was Van't Hof second doubles title of the year, and the sixth of his career.
