= 1992 Volvo San Francisco – Singles =

Singles
- 1992 Volvo San Francisco

Final
- Champion: (United States) Michael Chang
- Runner-up: (United States) Jim Courier
- Score: 6–3, 6–3

Details
- Draw: 32 (3WC / 4Q)
- Seeds: 8

Events
Singles	Doubles
← 1991 ·	Pacific Coast Championships	· 1993 →

Darren Cahill was the defending champion, but did not compete this year.

Michael Chang won the title by defeating Jim Courier 6–3, 6–3 in the final. Despite the loss, Courier reached the World No. 1 ranking for the first time in his career.

== Seeds ==
1. (United States) Jim Courier (final)
2. (United States) Michael Chang (champion)
3. (United States) Derrick Rostagno (semifinals)
4. (United States) Brad Gilbert (semifinals)
5. (United States) Richey Reneberg (second round)
6. (Spain) Francisco Clavet (second round)
7. (France) Thierry Champion (quarterfinals)
8. (United States) Jimmy Connors (second round)

== Draw ==
=== Key ===
- Q = Qualifier
- WC = Wild card
- LL = Lucky loser
- Alt = Alternate
- SE = Special exempt
- PR = Protected ranking
- ITF = ITF entry
- JE = Junior exempt
- w/o = Walkover
- r = Retired
- d = Defaulted
- SR = Special ranking

=== Finals ===
Semifinals
1	(United States) Jim Courier	4	6	6
3/WC	(United States) Derrick Rostagno	6	3	2
4	(United States) Brad Gilbert	0	5
2	(United States) Michael Chang	6	7

Final
1	(United States) Jim Courier	3	3
2	(United States) Michael Chang	6	6

=== Top half ===
First round
1	(United States) J Courier	7^{9}	5	7
(Australia) M Woodforde	6^{7}	7	5
(Australia) J Stoltenberg	7^{9}	6
(United States) K Curren	6^{7}	4
(Australia) W Masur	6	1	6
(United States) T Witsken	3	6	3
(United States) B Shelton	6^{6}	6	3
8	(United States) J Connors	7^{8}	2	6
3/WC	(United States) D Rostagno	5	7^{7}	6
(France) R Gilbert	7	6^{2}	1
(Sweden) N Kulti	6	6
WC	(United States) B MacPhie	4	4
(United States) J Tarango	7^{7}	5	6
(Argentina) J Frana	6^{5}	7	3
Q	(United States) T Martin	7^{7}	3	0
5	(United States) R Reneberg	6^{3}	6	6

Second round
1	(United States) J Courier	7	6
(Australia) J Stoltenberg	5	4
(Australia) W Masur	7^{7}	4	6
8	(United States) J Connors	6^{3}	6	3
3/WC	(United States) D Rostagno	4	7^{7}	6
(Sweden) N Kulti	6	6^{2}	4
(United States) J Tarango	6	7
5	(United States) R Reneberg	4	5

Quarterfinals
1	(United States) J Courier	4	6	6
(Australia) W Masur	6	4	3
3/WC	(United States) D Rostagno	7^{7}	6
(United States) J Tarango	6^{2}	1

Semifinals
1	(United States) J Courier	4	6	6
3/WC	(United States) D Rostagno	6	3	2

=== Bottom half ===
First round
6	(Spain) F Clavet	6	5	6
WC	(United States) A O'Brien	3	7	3
Q	(Germany) K Braasch	3	6	7^{7}
(United States) J Grabb	6	3	6^{4}
Q	(United States) J Stark	6	3	6
(Germany) P Baur	3	6	3
Q	(United States) C Adams	1	5
4	(United States) B Gilbert	6	7
7	(France) T Champion	3	6	7
(Germany) P Kühnen	6	4	5
(South Africa) G Muller	6	6^{5}	3
(Australia) R Fromberg	4	7^{7}	6
(Germany) C Saceanu	7	6^{5}	3
(Netherlands) M Schapers	5	7^{7}	6
(Sweden) J Gunnarsson	1	1
2	(United States) M Chang	6	6

Second round
6	(Spain) F Clavet	3	6	0
Q	(Germany) K Braasch	6	3	6
Q	(United States) J Stark	6	4	3
4	(United States) B Gilbert	3	6	6
7	(France) T Champion	6^{1}	7^{7}	6
(Australia) R Fromberg	7^{7}	6^{4}	0
(Netherlands) M Schapers	4	3
2	(United States) M Chang	6	6

Quarterfinals
Q	(Germany) K Braasch	6	1	1
4	(United States) B Gilbert	4	6	6
7	(France) T Champion	3	3
2	(United States) M Chang	6	6

Semifinals
4	(United States) B Gilbert	0	5
2	(United States) M Chang	6	7
