= 1994 Tokyo Indoor – Singles =

Singles
- 1994 Tokyo Indoor

Final
- Champion: (Croatia) Goran Ivanišević
- Runner-up: (United States) Michael Chang
- Score: 6–4, 6–4

Details
- Draw: 48
- Seeds: 16

Events
Singles	Doubles
- Tokyo Indoor

The Men’s Singles tournament of the 1994 Tokyo Indoor tennis championship took place in Tokyo, Japan, between 10 October and 16 October 1994. 64 players from 16 countries competed in the 6-round tournament. The final winner was Goran Ivanišević of Croatia, who defeated Michael Chang of the US. The defending champion from 1993, Ivan Lendl, did not compete.

== Seeds ==
1. (Croatia) Goran Ivanišević (champion)
2. (Spain) Sergi Bruguera (second round)
3. (Sweden) Stefan Edberg (semifinals)
4. (United States) Todd Martin (quarterfinals)
5. (Germany) Boris Becker (second round)
6. (United States) Michael Chang (final)
7. (Australia) Patrick Rafter (second round)
8. (Netherlands) Paul Haarhuis (third round)
9. (Netherlands) Richard Krajicek (quarterfinals)
10. (Netherlands) Jacco Eltingh (semifinals)
11. (United States) David Wheaton (second round)
12. (United States) Richey Reneberg (second round)
13. (Australia) Mark Woodforde (third round)
14. (United States) Aaron Krickstein (third round)
15. (Australia) Richard Fromberg (second round)
16. (United States) Jonathan Stark (quarterfinals)

== Draw ==
Key

- Q = Qualifier
- WC = Wild card
- LL = Lucky loser
- Alt = Alternate
- ITF = ITF entry
- PR = Protected ranking
- SR = Special ranking
- SE = Special exempt
- JE = Junior exempt
- JR = Junior Accelerator Programme entrant
- CO = College Accelerator Programme entrant
- NG = Next Gen Accelerator Program entrant
- w/o = Walkover
- r = Retired
- d = Defaulted

=== Finals ===
Semifinals
1	(Croatia) Goran Ivanišević	6	6
3	(Sweden) Stefan Edberg	4	4
6	(United States) Michael Chang	6	6
10	(Netherlands) Jacco Eltingh	3	4

Final
1	(Croatia) Goran Ivanišević	6	6
6	(United States) Michael Chang	4	4

=== Top half ===
==== Section 1 ====
First round
WC	(Japan) T Mori	2	5
Q	(Australia) J Eagle	6	7
(Sweden) T Enqvist	6^{10}	6	6^{5}
(Canada) G Rusedski	7^{12}	4	7^{7}
(Venezuela) N Pereira	6^{6}	6	3
WC	(South Korea) B-S Kim	7^{8}	4	6
(United Kingdom) M Petchey	3	2
Q	(Sweden) A Järryd	6	6

Second round
1	(Croatia) G Ivanišević	7^{7}	6
Q	(Australia) J Eagle	6^{4}	1
(Canada) G Rusedski	7^{7}	7^{7}
15	(Australia) R Fromberg	6^{5}	6^{5}
9	(Netherlands) R Krajicek	6	6
WC	(South Korea) B-S Kim	4	2
Q	(Sweden) A Järryd	3	4
8	(Netherlands) P Haarhuis	6	6

Third round
1	(Croatia) G Ivanišević	5	7^{7}	6
(Canada) G Rusedski	7	6^{5}	4
9	(Netherlands) R Krajicek	6	7^{7}
8	(Netherlands) P Haarhuis	4	6^{5}

Quarterfinals
1	(Croatia) G Ivanišević	7^{7}	7^{8}
9	(Netherlands) R Krajicek	6^{1}	6^{6}

==== Section 2 ====
First round
(Germany) A Mronz	6	6
Q	(United States) S Davis	4	4
(Ukraine) D Poliakov	6	6
WC	(Japan) T Chaen	1	3
(Sweden) T Nydahl	4	6	3
(Russia) A Olhovskiy	6	3	6
(New Zealand) B Steven	6	7
(United States) J Grabb	3	5

Second round
3	(Sweden) S Edberg	6	7
(Germany) A Mronz	1	5
(Ukraine) D Poliakov	1	2
13	(Australia) M Woodforde	6	6
12	(United States) R Reneberg	7^{7}	5	5
(Russia) A Olhovskiy	6^{5}	7	7
(New Zealand) B Steven	6	6
5	(Germany) B Becker	3	4

Third round
3	(Sweden) S Edberg	6	6
13	(Australia) M Woodforde	4	4
(Russia) A Olhovskiy	3	6	6^{4}
(New Zealand) B Steven	6	3	7^{7}

Quarterfinals
3	(Sweden) S Edberg	6	6
(New Zealand) B Steven	4	3

=== Bottom half ===
==== Section 3 ====
First round
(Venezuela) M Ruah	6	3	6^{1}
(United States) J Tarango	3	6	7^{7}
WC	(Australia) W Woodbridge	7^{7}	3	6
(Japan) S Matsuoka	6^{2}	6	3
(United States) R Weiss	2	2
(Zimbabwe) B Black	6	6
(Sweden) N Kulti	6	6
(Australia) J Morgan	4	4

Second round
6	(United States) M Chang	4	6	4
(United States) J Tarango	6	3	1^{r}
WC	(Australia) W Woodbridge	2	6	7^{7}
11	(United States) D Wheaton	6	3	6^{1}
14	(United States) A Krickstein	6	6
(Zimbabwe) B Black	1	1
(Sweden) N Kulti	6	2	2
4	(United States) T Martin	3	6	6

Third round
6	(United States) M Chang	3	6	6
WC	(Australia) W Woodbridge	6	4	3
14	(United States) A Krickstein	6^{0}	6	4
4	(United States) T Martin	7^{7}	0	6

Quarterfinals
6	(United States) M Chang	6	7^{8}
4	(United States) T Martin	3	6^{6}

==== Section 4 ====
First round
(United States) S Bryan	6	6^{3}	3
Q	(Australia) P Kilderry	1	7^{7}	6
(Sweden) H Holm	6^{7}	2
(United States) A O'Brien	7^{9}	6
(Australia) M Tebbutt	3	6^{2}
(Australia) W Masur	6	7^{7}
Q	(United States) T Ho	6	6
Q	(Mexico) Ó Ortiz	3	3

Second round
7	(Australia) P Rafter	3	2
Q	(Australia) P Kilderry	6	6
(United States) A O'Brien	4	5
10	(Netherlands) J Eltingh	6	7
16	(United States) J Stark	6	6
(Australia) W Masur	3	4
Q	(United States) T Ho	6^{4}	6	7^{7}
2	(Spain) S Bruguera	7^{7}	2	6^{1}

Third round
Q	(Australia) P Kilderry	6	5	6^{5}
10	(Netherlands) J Eltingh	4	7	7^{7}
16	(United States) J Stark	6	7^{7}
Q	(United States) T Ho	4	6^{3}

Quarterfinals
10	(Netherlands) J Eltingh	6	7^{7}
16	(United States) J Stark	2	6^{1}
