= 1988 Volvo Tennis Los Angeles – Doubles =

Doubles
- 1988 Volvo Tennis Los Angeles

Final
- Champions: (United States) John McEnroe (Australia) Mark Woodforde
- Runners-up: (Australia) Peter Doohan (United States) Jim Grabb
- Score: 6–4, 6–4

Details
- Draw: 16
- Seeds: 4

Events
Singles	Doubles
← 1987 ·	Los Angeles Open	· 1989 →

Kevin Curren and David Pate were the defending champions, but lost in the first round to tournament winners John McEnroe and Mark Woodforde.

McEnroe and Woodforde won the title by defeating Peter Doohan and Jim Grabb 6–4, 6–4 in the final.

This tournament saw an unusual event, as all seeded pairs were eliminated in the first round.

== Seeds ==
1. (Mexico) Jorge Lozano / (United States) Todd Witsken (first round)
2. (United States) Rick Leach / (United States) Jim Pugh (first round)
3. (United States) Kevin Curren / (United States) David Pate (first round)
4. (South Africa) Pieter Aldrich / (South Africa) Danie Visser (first round)

== Draw ==
=== Key ===
- Q = Qualifier
- WC = Wild card
- LL = Lucky loser
- Alt = Alternate
- SE = Special exempt
- PR = Protected ranking
- ITF = ITF entry
- JE = Junior exempt
- w/o = Walkover
- r = Retired
- d = Defaulted
- SR = Special ranking

=== Draw ===
First round
1	(Mexico) J Lozano (United States) T Witsken	3	6	6
(United States) S Davis (United States) T Wilkison	6	3	7
(United States) M Davis (United States) T Nelson	3	6	1
(Sweden) P Lundgren (Sweden) M Pernfors	6	3	6
3	(United States) K Curren (United States) D Pate	6	2	3
(United States) J McEnroe (Australia) M Woodforde	3	6	6
(United States) K Jones (United States) J Kriek	6	6
(West Germany) P Kühnen (United States) T Pawsat	3	3
(Australia) P Doohan (United States) J Grabb	7	6
(Australia) C Limberger (South Africa) C van Rensburg	6	4
(Australia) P Annacone (United States) P McEnroe	4	6	7
4	(South Africa) P Aldrich (South Africa) D Visser	6	3	6
(South Africa) E Edwards (South Africa) G Muller	3	5
(United States) A Kohlberg (United States) R Van't Hof	6	7
(United States) E Korita (United States) J Levine	6	7
2	(United States) R Leach (United States) J Pugh	3	6

Quarterfinals
(United States) S Davis (United States) T Wilkison	2	6	6
(Sweden) P Lundgren (Sweden) M Pernfors	6	3	1
(United States) J McEnroe (Australia) M Woodforde	7	6
(United States) K Jones (United States) J Kriek	6	4
(Australia) P Doohan (United States) J Grabb	7	6
(Australia) P Annacone (United States) P McEnroe	6	4
(United States) A Kohlberg (United States) R Van't Hof	3	6
(United States) E Korita (United States) J Levine	6	7

Semifinals
(United States) S Davis (United States) T Wilkison	6	6	4
(United States) J McEnroe (Australia) M Woodforde	7	2	6
(Australia) P Doohan (United States) J Grabb	6	6
(United States) E Korita (United States) J Levine	3	4

Final
(United States) J McEnroe (Australia) M Woodforde	6	6
(Australia) P Doohan (United States) J Grabb	4	4
