= 1991 Volvo San Francisco – Doubles =

Doubles
- 1991 Volvo San Francisco

Final
- Champions: (Australia) Wally Masur (Australia) Jason Stoltenberg
- Runners-up: (Sweden) Ronnie Båthman (Sweden) Rikard Bergh
- Score: 4–6, 7–6, 6–4

Details
- Draw: 16
- Seeds: 4

Events
| Singles | Doubles |
| ← 1990 · | Pacific Coast Championships | · 1992 → |

Kelly Jones and Robert Van't Hof were the defending champions, but Jones did not compete this year. Van't Hof teamed up with Laurie Warder and lost in the quarterfinals to Gary Muller and Danie Visser.

Wally Masur and Jason Stoltenberg won the title by defeating Ronnie Båthman and Rikard Bergh 4–6, 7–6, 6–4 in the final.

== Seeds ==
1. (United States) Scott Davis / (United States) David Pate (quarterfinals)
2. (United States) Rick Leach / (United States) Jim Pugh (first round)
3. (United Kingdom) Neil Broad / (United States) Kevin Curren (quarterfinals)
4. (South Africa) Gary Muller / (South Africa) Danie Visser (semifinals)

== Draw ==
=== Key ===
- Q = Qualifier
- WC = Wild card
- LL = Lucky loser
- Alt = Alternate
- ITF = ITF entry
- PR = Protected ranking
- SR = Special ranking
- SE = Special exempt
- JE = Junior exempt
- JR = Junior Accelerator Programme entrant
- CO = College Accelerator Programme entrant
- NG = Next Gen Accelerator Program entrant
- w/o = Walkover
- r = Retired
- d = Defaulted

=== Draw ===
First round
1 | (United States) S Davis (United States) D Pate | 6 | 7
(United States) J Brown (United States) S Salumaa | 1 | 6
(United States) J Canter (Sweden) T Svantesson | 6 | 6
(Spain) T Carbonell (West Germany) U Riglewski | 0 | 3
3 | (United Kingdom) N Broad (United States) K Curren | 1 | 7 | 7
WC | (United States) A Agassi (United States) J McEnroe | 6 | 6 | 5
(Sweden) R Båthman (Sweden) R Bergh | 5 | 6 | 6
(United States) M Davis (Ecuador) A Gómez | 7 | 2 | 0
(South Africa) S Kruger (United States) S Melville | 3 | 6 | 1
(United States) R Van't Hof (Australia) L Warder | 6 | 3 | 6
(South Africa) R Deppe (United States) J Sobel | 3 | 2
4 | (South Africa) G Muller (South Africa) D Visser | 6 | 6
(Australia) W Masur (Australia) J Stoltenberg | 7 | 6
(United States) B Garnett (South Africa) P Norval | 6 | 4
(United States) B Garrow (United States) B Pearce | 6 | 6
2 | (United States) R Leach (United States) J Pugh | 4 | 3

Quarterfinals
1 | (United States) S Davis (United States) D Pate | 6 | 3
(United States) J Canter (Sweden) T Svantesson | 7 | 6
3 | (United Kingdom) N Broad (United States) K Curren | 4 | 6
(Sweden) R Båthman (Sweden) R Bergh | 6 | 7
(United States) R Van't Hof (Australia) L Warder | 4 | 6
4 | (South Africa) G Muller (South Africa) D Visser | 6 | 7
(Australia) W Masur (Australia) J Stoltenberg | 5 | 6 | 6
(United States) B Garrow (United States) B Pearce | 7 | 4 | 2

Semifinals
(United States) J Canter (Sweden) T Svantesson | 5 | 3
(Sweden) R Båthman (Sweden) R Bergh | 7 | 6
4 | (South Africa) G Muller (South Africa) D Visser | 4 | 4
(Australia) W Masur (Australia) J Stoltenberg | 6 | 6

Final
(Sweden) R Båthman (Sweden) R Bergh | 6 | 6 | 4
(Australia) W Masur (Australia) J Stoltenberg | 4 | 7 | 6
