= 1988 Transamerica Open – Singles =

Singles
- 1988 Transamerica Open

Final
- Champion: (United States) Michael Chang
- Runner-up: (United States) Johan Kriek
- Score: 6–2, 6–3

Details
- Draw: 32 (3WC/4Q)
- Seeds: 8

Events
Singles	Doubles
- Pacific Coast Championships

Peter Lundgren was the defending champion, but lost in the first round to David Pate.

Michael Chang won the title by defeating Johan Kriek 6–2, 6–3 in the final.

== Seeds ==
1. (United States) Aaron Krickstein (first round)
2. (United States) Kevin Curren (quarterfinals)
3. (United States) John McEnroe (semifinals)
4. (Sweden) Mikael Pernfors (quarterfinals)
5. (United States) David Pate (second round)
6. (United States) Dan Goldie (second round)
7. (United States) Derrick Rostagno (first round)
8. (Australia) Mark Woodforde (first round)

== Draw ==
Key

- Q = Qualifier
- WC = Wild card
- LL = Lucky loser
- Alt = Alternate
- ITF = ITF entry
- PR = Protected ranking
- SR = Special ranking
- SE = Special exempt
- JE = Junior exempt
- JR = Junior Accelerator Programme entrant
- CO = College Accelerator Programme entrant
- NG = Next Gen Accelerator Program entrant
- w/o = Walkover
- r = Retired
- d = Defaulted

=== Finals ===
Semifinals
Q	(South Africa) Danie Visser	5	4
(United States) Michael Chang	7	5
3	(United States) John McEnroe	4	6	4
(United States) Johan Kriek	6	3	6

Final
(United States) Michael Chang	6	6
(United States) Johan Kriek	2	3

=== Top half ===
First round
1	(United States) A Krickstein	3	4
Q	(United States) R Matuszewski	6	6
Q	(South Africa) D Visser	6	7	6
WC	(United States) B Garrow	7	6	0
Q	(United States) D Cassidy	4	3
(West Germany) C Saceanu	6	6
(United States) P Annacone	6	6
7	(United States) D Rostagno	4	2
4	(Sweden) M Pernfors	6	6
(United States) T Nelson	3	2
(South Africa) C van Rensburg	4	6	5
WC	(United States) J Tarango	6	4	7
(West Germany) P Kühnen	4	2
(United States) M Chang	6	6
(Australia) B Dyke	6	6
6	(United States) D Goldie	7	7

Second round
Q	(United States) R Matuszewski	1	6
Q	(South Africa) D Visser	6	7
(West Germany) C Saceanu	3	4
(United States) P Annacone	6	6
4	(Sweden) M Pernfors	1	7	6
WC	(United States) J Tarango	6	5	1
(United States) M Chang	6	6
6	(United States) D Goldie	1	4

Quarterfinals
Q	(South Africa) D Visser	6	6
(United States) P Annacone	4	4
4	(Sweden) M Pernfors	4	0
(United States) M Chang	6	6

Semifinals
Q	(South Africa) D Visser	5	4
(United States) M Chang	7	6

=== Bottom half ===
First round
5	(United States) D Pate	7	6
(Sweden) P Lundgren	5	4
(United States) T Wilkison	6	6
Q	(South Africa) C Honey	1	1
WC	(United States) P McEnroe	1	2
(United States) J Pugh	6	6
(United States) R Reneberg	3	2
3	(United States) J McEnroe	6	6
8	(Australia) M Woodforde	2	6	6
(United States) J Kriek	6	4	7
(United States) J Grabb	3	7	7
(United States) M Davis	6	6	6
(United States) J Rive	6	6	6
(South Africa) M Robertson	0	7	3
(Peru) J Yzaga	6	2	0
2	(United States) K Curren	1	6	6

Second round
5	(United States) D Pate	6	6	3
(United States) T Wilkison	2	7	6
(United States) J Pugh	5	4
3	(United States) J McEnroe	7	6
(United States) J Kriek	6	6
(United States) J Grabb	1	2
(United States) J Rive	4	2
2	(United States) K Curren	6	6

Quarterfinals
(United States) T Wilkison	6	2	2
3	(United States) J McEnroe	2	6	6
(United States) J Kriek	1	6	6
2	(United States) K Curren	6	4	2

Semifinals
3	(United States) J McEnroe	4	6	4
(United States) J Kriek	6	3	6
