= 1988 Transamerica Open =

- Date: September 26 – October 2
- Edition: 100th
- Category: Grand Prix (Super Series)
- Draw: 32S / 16D
- Prize money: $297,500
- Surface: Carpet / indoor
- Location: San Francisco, U.S.
- Venue: Cow Palace

Champions

Singles
- (United States) Michael Chang

Doubles
- (United States) John McEnroe / (Australia) Mark Woodforde
← 1987 ·	Pacific Coast Championships	· 1989 →

The 1988 Transamerica Open, also known as the Pacific Coast Championships, was a men's tennis tournament played on indoor carpet courts at the Cow Palace in San Francisco, California in the United States. The event was part of the Super Series of the 1988 Nabisco Grand Prix circuit. It was the 100th edition of the tournament and was held from September 26 through October 2, 1988. Unseeded Michael Chang won the singles title and earned $59,500 first-prize money. At age 16 he became the youngest winner of a Grand Prix Super Series event.

== Finals ==
=== Singles ===
(United States) Michael Chang defeated (United States) Johan Kriek 6–2, 6–3

- It was Chang's first singles title of his career.

=== Doubles ===
(United States) John McEnroe / (Australia) Mark Woodforde defeated (United States) Scott Davis / (United States) Tim Wilkison 6–4, 7–6
