= 1989 Volvo Tennis San Francisco – Doubles =

Doubles
- 1989 Volvo Tennis San Francisco

Final
- Champions: (South Africa) Pieter Aldrich (South Africa) Danie Visser
- Runners-up: (United States) Paul Annacone (South Africa) Christo van Rensburg
- Score: 6–4, 6–3

Details
- Draw: 16
- Seeds: 4

Events
Singles	Doubles
← 1988 ·	Pacific Coast Championships	· 1990 →

John McEnroe and Mark Woodforde were the defending champions, but none competed this year.

Pieter Aldrich and Danie Visser won the title by defeating Paul Annacone and Christo van Rensburg 6–4, 6–3 in the final.

== Seeds ==
1. (Australia) John Fitzgerald / (Sweden) Anders Järryd (quarterfinals)
2. (United States) Rick Leach / (United States) Jim Pugh (first round)
3. (United States) Jim Grabb / (United States) Patrick McEnroe (semifinals)
4. (United States) Paul Annacone / (South Africa) Christo van Rensburg (final)

== Draw ==
=== Key ===
- Q = Qualifier
- WC = Wild card
- LL = Lucky loser
- Alt = Alternate
- SE = Special exempt
- PR = Protected ranking
- ITF = ITF entry
- JE = Junior exempt
- w/o = Walkover
- r = Retired
- d = Defaulted
- SR = Special ranking

=== Draw ===
First round
1	(Australia) J Fitzgerald (Sweden) A Järryd	6	7
(United States) S DeVries (United States) R Matuszewski	4	5
(South Africa) P Aldrich (South Africa) D Visser	6	6
(United States) P Chamberlin (United States) T Wilkison	2	3
3	(United States) J Grabb (United States) P McEnroe	7	5	6
(United States) L Jensen (United States) D Wheaton	6	7	3
(United States) R Reneberg (United States) P Sampras	7	4	6
(United States) M Davis (United States) T Pawsat	5	6	7
(United States) S Davis (New Zealand) K Evernden	6	6
(Mexico) L Lavalle (The Bahamas) R Smith	1	4
(Sweden) R Båthman (Sweden) P Lundgren	4	2
4	(United States) P Annacone (South Africa) C van Rensburg	6	6
(United States) K Curren (United States) D Pate	7	6
WC	(United States) P Galbraith (United States) B Garrow	6	1
(United States) D Rostagno (United States) T Witsken	2	6	6
2	(United States) R Leach (United States) J Pugh	6	4	3

Quarterfinals
1	(Australia) J Fitzgerald (Sweden) A Järryd	6	6	2
(South Africa) P Aldrich (South Africa) D Visser	4	7	6
3	(United States) J Grabb (United States) P McEnroe	7	3	6
(United States) M Davis (United States) T Pawsat	6	6	3
(United States) S Davis (New Zealand) K Evernden	6	6	2
4	(United States) P Annacone (South Africa) C van Rensburg	4	7	6
(United States) K Curren (United States) D Pate	6	3	6
(United States) D Rostagno (United States) T Witsken	4	6	3

Semifinals
(South Africa) P Aldrich (South Africa) D Visser	6	6
3	(United States) J Grabb (United States) P McEnroe	4	4
4	(United States) P Annacone (South Africa) C van Rensburg	6	6
(United States) K Curren (United States) D Pate	3	4

Final
(South Africa) P Aldrich (South Africa) D Visser	6	6
4	(United States) P Annacone (South Africa) C van Rensburg	4	3
