= 1989 Volvo Tennis San Francisco – Singles =

Singles
- 1989 Volvo Tennis San Francisco

Final
- Champion: (United States) Brad Gilbert
- Runner-up: (Sweden) Anders Järryd
- Score: 7–5, 6–2

Details
- Draw: 32 (3WC/4Q/1LL)
- Seeds: 8

Events
Singles	Doubles
- Pacific Coast Championships

Michael Chang was the defending champion, but lost in the quarterfinals to Kelly Evernden.

Brad Gilbert won the title, by defeating Anders Järryd 7–5, 6–2 in the final.

== Seeds ==
1. (n/a)
2. (United States) Michael Chang (quarterfinals)
3. (United States) Brad Gilbert (champion)
4. (United States) Tim Mayotte (second round)
5. (United States) Kevin Curren (semifinals)
6. (South Africa) Christo van Rensburg (quarterfinals)
7. (Australia) John Fitzgerald (first round)
8. (Socialist Federal Republic of Yugoslavia) Slobodan Živojinović (second round)

== Draw ==
Key

- Q = Qualifier
- WC = Wild card
- LL = Lucky loser
- Alt = Alternate
- ITF = ITF entry
- PR = Protected ranking
- SR = Special ranking
- SE = Special exempt
- JE = Junior exempt
- JR = Junior Accelerator Programme entrant
- CO = College Accelerator Programme entrant
- NG = Next Gen Accelerator Program entrant
- w/o = Walkover
- r = Retired
- d = Defaulted

=== Finals ===
Semifinals
(Sweden) Anders Järryd	3	7	7
5	(United States) Kevin Curren	6	6	5
3	(United States) Brad Gilbert	4	6	7
(New Zealand) Kelly Evernden	6	1	6

Final
(Sweden) Anders Järryd	5	2
3	(United States) Brad Gilbert	7	6

=== Top half ===
First round
LL	(United States) B Garrow	4	4
(Canada) A Sznajder	6	6
(Sweden) P Lundgren	4	3
(United States) D Rostagno	6	6
(Australia) D Cahill	1	0
(Sweden) A Järryd	6	6
(Mexico) L Lavalle	5	6
8/WC	(Socialist Federal Republic of Yugoslavia) S Živojinović	7	7
4	(United States) T Mayotte	6	7
(United States) J Pugh	2	6
Q	(United States) P Galbraith	4	3
(United States) J Grabb	6	6
(United States) T Witsken	6	7
Q	(United States) J Tarango	4	6
WC	(United States) T Wilkison	4	6
5	(United States) K Curren	6	7

Second round
(Canada) A Sznajder	3	2
(United States) D Rostagno	6	6
(Sweden) A Järryd	6	3	6
8/WC	(Socialist Federal Republic of Yugoslavia) S Živojinović	3	6	3
4	(United States) T Mayotte	6	3	5
(United States) J Grabb	4	6	7
(United States) T Witsken	4	6	1
5	(United States) K Curren	6	3	6

Quarterfinals
(United States) D Rostagno	2	2^{r}
(Sweden) A Järryd	6	3
(United States) J Grabb	2	3
5	(United States) K Curren	6	6

Semifinals
(Sweden) A Järryd	3	7	7
5	(United States) K Curren	6	6	5

=== Bottom half ===
First round
6	(South Africa) C van Rensburg	6	6
WC	(United States) P Sampras	4	4
(South Africa) P Aldrich	3	6	6
Q	(United States) R Weiss	6	3	1
(United States) D Wheaton	6	3	4
(United States) S Davis	3	6	6
(United States) R Matuszewski	2	4
3	(United States) B Gilbert	6	6
7	(Australia) J Fitzgerald	3	6	1
(United States) L Shiras	6	3	6
(New Zealand) K Evernden	6	7
(United States) P Annacone	4	6
(United States) P Chamberlin	6	6
Q	(United States) J Rive	4	3
(United States) R Reneberg	6	4
2	(United States) M Chang	7	6

Second round
6	(South Africa) C van Rensburg	7	6
(South Africa) P Aldrich	5	4
(United States) S Davis	3	4
3	(United States) B Gilbert	6	6
(United States) L Shiras	6	2
(New Zealand) K Evernden	7	6
(United States) P Chamberlin	1	2
2	(United States) M Chang	6	6

Quarterfinals
6	(South Africa) C van Rensburg	5	3
3	(United States) B Gilbert	7	6
(New Zealand) K Evernden	6	6
2	(United States) M Chang	0	1

Semifinals
3	(United States) B Gilbert	4	6	7
(New Zealand) K Evernden	6	1	6
