= 1991 Volvo San Francisco =

- Date: February 4–10
- Edition: 103rd
- Category: World Series
- Draw: 32S / 16D
- Prize money: $225,000
- Surface: Carpet / indoor
- Location: San Francisco, U.S.
- Venue: San Francisco Civic Auditorium

Champions

Singles
- (Australia) Darren Cahill

Doubles
- (Australia) Wally Masur / (Australia) Jason Stoltenberg
← 1990 ·	Pacific Coast Championships	· 1992 →

The 1991 Volvo San Francisco was a men's tennis tournament played on indoor carpet courts at the San Francisco Civic Auditorium in San Francisco, California in the United States and was part of the World Series of the 1991 ATP Tour. It was the 103rd edition of the tournament and was held from February 4 through February 10, 1991. Sixth-seeded Darren Cahill won the singles title and earned $33,800 first-prize money.

== Finals ==
=== Singles ===
(Australia) Darren Cahill defeated (United States) Brad Gilbert 6–2, 3–6, 6–4

- It was Cahill's only singles title of the year and the 2nd and last of his career.

=== Doubles ===
(Australia) Wally Masur / (Australia) Jason Stoltenberg defeated (Sweden) Ronnie Båthman / (Sweden) Rikard Bergh 4–6, 7–6, 6–4
