= 1991 Volvo San Francisco – Singles =

Singles
- 1991 Volvo San Francisco

Final
- Champion: (Australia) Darren Cahill
- Runner-up: (United States) Brad Gilbert
- Score: 6–2, 3–6, 6–4

Details
- Draw: 32 (4Q / 3WC)
- Seeds: 8

Events
Singles	Doubles
← 1990 ·	Pacific Coast Championships	· 1992 →

Andre Agassi was the defending champion, but lost in semifinals to Brad Gilbert.

Darren Cahill won the title by defeating Gilbert 6–2, 3–6, 6–4 in the final.

== Seeds ==
1. (United States) Andre Agassi (semifinals)
2. (Ecuador) Andrés Gómez (second round)
3. (United States) Brad Gilbert (final)
4. (United States) John McEnroe (quarterfinals)
5. (United States) Tim Mayotte (second round)
6. (Australia) Darren Cahill (champion)
7. (Australia) Wally Masur (semifinals)
8. (South Africa) Gary Muller (first round)

== Draw ==
=== Key ===
- Q = Qualifier
- WC = Wild card
- LL = Lucky loser
- Alt = Alternate
- ITF = ITF entry
- PR = Protected ranking
- SR = Special ranking
- SE = Special exempt
- JE = Junior exempt
- JR = Junior Accelerator Programme entrant
- CO = College Accelerator Programme entrant
- NG = Next Gen Accelerator Program entrant
- w/o = Walkover
- r = Retired
- d = Defaulted

=== Finals ===
Semifinals
1	(United States) Andre Agassi	1	2
3	(United States) Brad Gilbert	6	6
6	(Australia) Darren Cahill	4	6	7
7	(Australia) Wally Masur	6	4	5

Final
3	(United States) Brad Gilbert	2	6	4
6	(Australia) Darren Cahill	6	3	6

=== Top half ===
First round
1	(United States) A Agassi	7^{7}	6
Q	(United States) J Tarango	6^{5}	3
Q	(South Africa) M Ondruska	1	3
(West Germany) U Riglewski	6	6
(United States) S Davis	5	3
(United States) K Curren	7	6
(Mexico) L Herrera	6	7^{7}
8	(South Africa) G Muller	4	6^{4}
3	(United States) B Gilbert	6	3	6
(West Germany) P Kühnen	3	6	2
(West Germany) A Mronz	7^{7}	6
Q	(United States) R Leach	6^{3}	3
(United States) D Goldie	6	5	6
(United States) J Grabb	4	7	3
(Spain) T Carbonell	4	6^{6}
5/WC	(United States) T Mayotte	6	7^{8}

Second round
1	(United States) A Agassi	3	6	6
(West Germany) U Riglewski	6	4	3
(United States) K Curren	4	7^{8}	6
(Mexico) L Herrera	6	6^{6}	2
3	(United States) B Gilbert	6	6
(West Germany) A Mronz	3	3
(United States) D Goldie	2	7^{8}	7
5/WC	(United States) T Mayotte	6	6^{6}	5

Quarterfinals
1	(United States) A Agassi	6	6
(United States) K Curren	2	4
3	(United States) B Gilbert	6	5	6
(United States) D Goldie	1	7	4

Semifinals
1	(United States) A Agassi	1	2
3	(United States) B Gilbert	6	6

=== Bottom half ===
First round
6	(Australia) D Cahill	6	6
(Sweden) T Högstedt	2	2
(United States) B Garrow	1	1
(France) G Raoux	6	6
(Australia) M Kratzmann	6	7^{7}
(Finland) V Paloheimo	3	6^{1}
(Canada) A Sznajder	3	0
4/WC	(United States) J McEnroe	6	6
7	(Australia) W Masur	6	6
(United States) B Pearce	1	4
(India) R Krishnan	7^{7}	7^{7}
(Finland) A Rahunen	6^{4}	6^{1}
(United States) D Pate	6	7
WC	(United States) P Chamberlin	3	5
Q	(United States) B Devening	6	4	4
2	(Ecuador) A Gómez	4	6	6

Second round
6	(Australia) D Cahill	5	6	6
(France) G Raoux	7	4	3
(Australia) M Kratzmann	4	6
4/WC	(United States) J McEnroe	6	7
7	(Australia) W Masur	6	6
(India) R Krishnan	3	3
(United States) D Pate	1	6	6
2	(Ecuador) A Gómez	6	4	2

Quarterfinals
6	(Australia) D Cahill	7	3	6
4/WC	(United States) J McEnroe	6	6	3
7	(Australia) W Masur	6	4	7
(United States) D Pate	1	6	6

Semifinals
6	(Australia) D Cahill	4	6	7
7	(Australia) W Masur	6	4	5
