= 1989 Volvo Tennis San Francisco =

- Date: September 25 – October 1
- Edition: 101st
- Category: Grand Prix (Super Series)
- Draw: 32S / 16D
- Prize money: $297,500
- Surface: Carpet / indoor
- Location: San Francisco, U.S.
- Venue: Cow Palace

Champions

Singles
- (United States) Brad Gilbert

Doubles
- (South Africa) Pieter Aldrich / (South Africa) Danie Visser
← 1988 ·	Pacific Coast Championships	· 1990 →

The 1989 Volvo Tennis San Francisco, also known as the Pacific Coast Championships, was a men's tennis tournament played on indoor carpet courts at the Cow Palace in San Francisco, California in the United States. The event was part of the Super Series of the 1989 Nabisco Grand Prix circuit. The 100-year anniversary of the inaugural event was the 101st edition of the tournament and was held from September 25 through October 1, 1989. Third-seeded Brad Gilbert won the singles title and earned $59,500 first-prize money.

== Finals ==
=== Singles ===
(United States) Brad Gilbert defeated (Sweden) Anders Järryd 7–5, 6–2

- It was Gilbert's 5th singles title of the year and the 17th of his career.

=== Doubles ===
(South Africa) Pieter Aldrich / (South Africa) Danie Visser defeated (United States) Paul Annacone / (South Africa) Christo van Rensburg 6–4, 6–3
