= 1994 Tokyo Indoor =

- Date: 10–16 October
- Edition: 17th
- Category: Championship Series
- Draw: 48S / 24D
- Prize money: $895,000
- Surface: Carpet / indoor
- Location: Tokyo, Japan

Champions

Singles
- (Croatia) Goran Ivanišević

Doubles
- (Canada) Grant Connell / (United States) Patrick Galbraith
- Tokyo Indoor

The 1994 Tokyo Indoor also known as "Seiko Super Tennis" was a men's tennis tournament played on indoor carpet courts in Tokyo, Japan that was part of the IBM 1994 ATP Tour and was an ATP Championship Series event. The tournament was held from 10 October through 16 October 1994. Matches were the best of three sets. First-seeded Goran Ivanišević won the singles title.

== Finals ==
=== Singles ===
(Croatia) Goran Ivanišević defeated (United States) Michael Chang 6–4, 6–4

- It was Ivanišević' 2nd singles title of the year and the 11th of his career.

=== Doubles ===
(Canada) Grant Connell / (United States) Patrick Galbraith defeated (Zimbabwe) Byron Black / (United States) Jonathan Stark 6–3, 3–6, 6–4
