= 1988 Volvo Tennis Los Angeles =

- Date: September 19–25
- Edition: 62nd
- Category: Grand Prix (Super Series)
- Draw: 32S / 16D
- Prize money: $297,500
- Surface: Hard / outdoor
- Location: Los Angeles, CA, U.S.
- Venue: Los Angeles Tennis Center

Champions

Singles
- (Sweden) Mikael Pernfors

Doubles
- (United States) John McEnroe / (Australia) Mark Woodforde
← 1987 ·	Los Angeles Open	· 1989 →

The 1988 Volvo Tennis Los Angeles was a men's tennis tournament played on outdoor hard courts at the Los Angeles Tennis Center in Los Angeles, California in the United States that was part of the 1988 Nabisco Grand Prix. It was the 62nd edition of the tournament and was held from September 19 through September 25, 1988. Fourth-seeded Mikael Pernfors won the singles title and earned $59,500 first-prize money.

== Finals ==
=== Singles ===
(Sweden) Mikael Pernfors defeated (United States) Andre Agassi 6–2, 7–5

- It was Pernfors' first singles title of his career.

=== Doubles ===
(United States) John McEnroe / (Australia) Mark Woodforde defeated (Australia) Peter Doohan / (United States) Jim Grabb 6–4, 6–4
