= Toshitsugu Mori =

Japanese tennis player (born 1969)

- Country (sports): Japan
- Born: 22 December 1969 (age 56) Higashiōsaka, Japan
- Height: 186 cm (6 ft 1 in)
- Prize money: $17,136

Singles
- Career record: 0–2
- Highest ranking: No. 579 (19 Sep 1995)

Grand Slam singles results
- Australian Open: Q1 (1993, 1994, 1995)

Doubles
- Career record: 0–3
- Highest ranking: No. 473 (13 Sep 1993)

Toshitsugu Mori (born 22 December 1969) is a Japanese former professional tennis player.

Born in Higashiōsaka, Mori played on the professional tour during the 1990s and had a best singles ranking of 579 in the world. He represented Japan at the 1991 Summer Universiade and won a doubles title at the All-Japan Championships in 1994. Both of his two ATP Tour singles main draw appearance came in 1994, at the Japan Open and the Tokyo Indoor tournaments. He featured in the qualifying draw in three editions of the Australian Open.
