= 1990 Volvo Tennis Los Angeles – Singles =

Singles
- 1990 Volvo Tennis Los Angeles

Final
- Champion: (Sweden) Stefan Edberg
- Runner-up: (United States) Michael Chang
- Score: 7–6^{(7–4)}, 2–6, 7–6^{(7–3)}

Details
- Draw: 32 (4Q / 3WC)
- Seeds: 8

Events
Singles	Doubles
- Los Angeles Open

Aaron Krickstein was the defending champion, but lost in the first round to Todd Witsken.

Stefan Edberg won the title by defeating Michael Chang 7–6^{(7–4)}, 2–6, 7–6^{(7–3)} in the final.

== Seeds ==
1. (Sweden) Stefan Edberg (Winner)
2. (United States) Aaron Krickstein (first round)
3. (United States) Pete Sampras (semifinals)
4. (United States) Michael Chang (finals)
5. (United States) Richey Reneberg (first round)
6. (France) Jean-Philippe Fleurian (second round)
7. (South Africa) Gary Muller (quarterfinals)
8. (Czech Republic) Milan Šrejber (first round)

== Draw ==
Key

- Q = Qualifier
- WC = Wild card
- LL = Lucky loser
- Alt = Alternate
- ITF = ITF entry
- PR = Protected ranking
- SR = Special ranking
- SE = Special exempt
- JE = Junior exempt
- JR = Junior Accelerator Programme entrant
- CO = College Accelerator Programme entrant
- NG = Next Gen Accelerator Program entrant
- w/o = Walkover
- r = Retired
- d = Defaulted

=== Finals ===
Semifinals
1	(Sweden) Stefan Edberg	6	6^{2}	6
3	(United States) Pete Sampras	2	7^{7}	1
4	(United States) Michael Chang	7^{7}	6
7	(South Africa) Gary Muller	6^{4}	2

Final
1	(Sweden) Stefan Edberg	7^{7}	2	7^{7}
4	(United States) Michael Chang	6^{4}	6	6^{3}

=== Top half ===
First round
1	(Sweden) S Edberg	6	6
(United States) MV Washington	2	4
(United States) K Jones	5	4
Q	(Japan) S Matsuoka	7	6
(United States) D Pate	6	4	6
Q	(Australia) D Macpherson	3	6	1
(United States) J Tarango	7	2	6
8	(Czechoslovakia) M Šrejber	6	6	2
3	(United States) P Sampras	7	6
WC	(United States) R Leach	5	3
(United States) B Pearce	6	7
Q	(Mexico) J Lozano	3	6
(Australia) J Stoltenberg	6	7
Q	(Venezuela) N Pereira	4	6
WC	(United States) D Rostagno	6	6
5	(United States) R Reneberg	1	3

Second round
1	(Sweden) S Edberg	7	6
Q	(Japan) S Matsuoka	5	4
(United States) D Pate	4	7	4
(United States) J Tarango	6	6	6
3	(United States) P Sampras	6	2	6
(United States) B Pearce	2	6	4
(Australia) J Stoltenberg	6	6
WC	(United States) D Rostagno	2	3

Quarterfinals
1	(Sweden) S Edberg	6	6
(United States) J Tarango	4	4
3	(United States) P Sampras	6	6
(Australia) J Stoltenberg	3	4

Semifinals
1	(Sweden) S Edberg	6	6^{2}	6
3	(United States) P Sampras	2	7^{7}	1

=== Bottom half ===
First round
6	(France) JP Fleurian	6	6
(United States) R Weiss	1	4
(United States) J Pugh	5	1
(United States) D Goldie	7	6
(Sweden) T Högstedt	3	4
(Canada) A Sznajder	6	6
(United States) S Davis	5	6	4
4	(United States) M Chang	7	4	6
7	(South Africa) G Muller	6	3	6
WC	(United States) C Adams	4	6	3
(Sweden) P Lundgren	2	4
(United States) J Rive	6	6
(United States) B Garrow	6	6
(South Africa) M Kaplan	2	4
(United States) T Witsken	5	7	6
2	(United States) A Krickstein	7	6	4

Second round
6	(France) JP Fleurian	7	6	2
(United States) D Goldie	6	7	6
(Canada) A Sznajder	2	3
4	(United States) M Chang	6	6
7	(South Africa) G Muller	2	6	6
(United States) J Rive	6	3	1
(United States) B Garrow	4	6	6
(United States) T Witsken	6	0	3

Quarterfinals
(United States) D Goldie	1	5
4	(United States) M Chang	6	7
7	(South Africa) G Muller	6	6
(United States) B Garrow	3	4

Semifinals
4	(United States) M Chang	7^{7}	6
7	(South Africa) G Muller	6^{4}	2
