= 1990 Volvo Tennis Los Angeles – Doubles =

Doubles
- 1990 Volvo Tennis Los Angeles

Final
- Champions: (United States) Scott Davis (United States) David Pate
- Runners-up: (Sweden) Peter Lundgren (Kenya) Paul Wekesa
- Score: 3–6, 6–1, 6–3

Details
- Draw: 16
- Seeds: 4

Events
| Singles | Doubles |
- Los Angeles Open

Martin Davis and Tim Pawsat were the defending champions, but none competed this year. Davis retired from professional tennis during this season.

Scott Davis and David Pate won the title by defeating Peter Lundgren and Paul Wekesa 3–6, 6–1, 6–3 in the final.

== Seeds ==
1. (United States) Rick Leach / (United States) Jim Pugh (semifinals)
2. (Mexico) Jorge Lozano / (United States) Todd Witsken (semifinals)
3. (United States) Scott Davis / (United States) David Pate (champions)
4. (United Kingdom) Neil Broad / (South Africa) Gary Muller (first round)

== Draw ==
Key

- Q = Qualifier
- WC = Wild card
- LL = Lucky loser
- Alt = Alternate
- ITF = ITF entry
- PR = Protected ranking
- SR = Special ranking
- SE = Special exempt
- JE = Junior exempt
- JR = Junior Accelerator Programme entrant
- CO = College Accelerator Programme entrant
- NG = Next Gen Accelerator Program entrant
- w/o = Walkover
- r = Retired
- d = Defaulted

=== Draw ===
First round
1 | (United States) R Leach (United States) J Pugh | 6 | 6
(United States) R Reneberg (United States) P Sampras | 4 | 2
(South Africa) S Kruger (Australia) S Youl | 4 | 4
(United States) J Canter (United States) S Cannon | 6 | 6
3 | (United States) S Davis (United States) D Pate | 6 | 3 | 6
(India) V Amritraj (United States) E Teltscher | 3 | 6 | 3
(United States) S DeVries (Australia) D Macpherson | 3 | 7 | 6
(United States) P Galbraith (United States) K Jones | 6 | 6 | 2
(Sweden) P Lundgren (Kenya) P Wekesa | 6 | 6
Q | (United States) M Roberts (United States) V Winitsky | 4 | 0
(United States) T Nelson (United States) J Rive | 7 | 6
4 | (United Kingdom) N Broad (South Africa) G Muller | 6 | 3
(Venezuela) N Pereira (Australia) J Stoltenberg | 3 | 6
(France) JP Fleurian (United States) D Rostagno | 6 | 7
(United States) B Garrow (South Africa) B Talbot | 4 | 0
2 | (Mexico) J Lozano (United States) T Witsken | 6 | 6

Quarterfinals
1 | (United States) R Leach (United States) J Pugh | 6 | 6
(United States) J Canter (United States) S Cannon | 4 | 4
3 | (United States) S Davis (United States) D Pate | 6 | 6
(United States) S DeVries (Australia) D Macpherson | 1 | 4
(Sweden) P Lundgren (Kenya) P Wekesa | 7 | 7
(United States) T Nelson (United States) J Rive | 6 | 6
(France) JP Fleurian (United States) D Rostagno | 6 | 4 | 1
2 | (Mexico) J Lozano (United States) T Witsken | 3 | 6 | 6

Semifinals
1 | (United States) R Leach (United States) J Pugh | 3 | 6 | 3
3 | (United States) S Davis (United States) D Pate | 6 | 3 | 6
(Sweden) P Lundgren (Kenya) P Wekesa | 6 | 3 | 7
2 | (Mexico) J Lozano (United States) T Witsken | 3 | 6 | 6

Final
3 | (United States) S Davis (United States) D Pate | 3 | 6 | 6
(Sweden) P Lundgren (Kenya) P Wekesa | 6 | 1 | 3
