= Michael Chang =

American tennis player (born 1972)

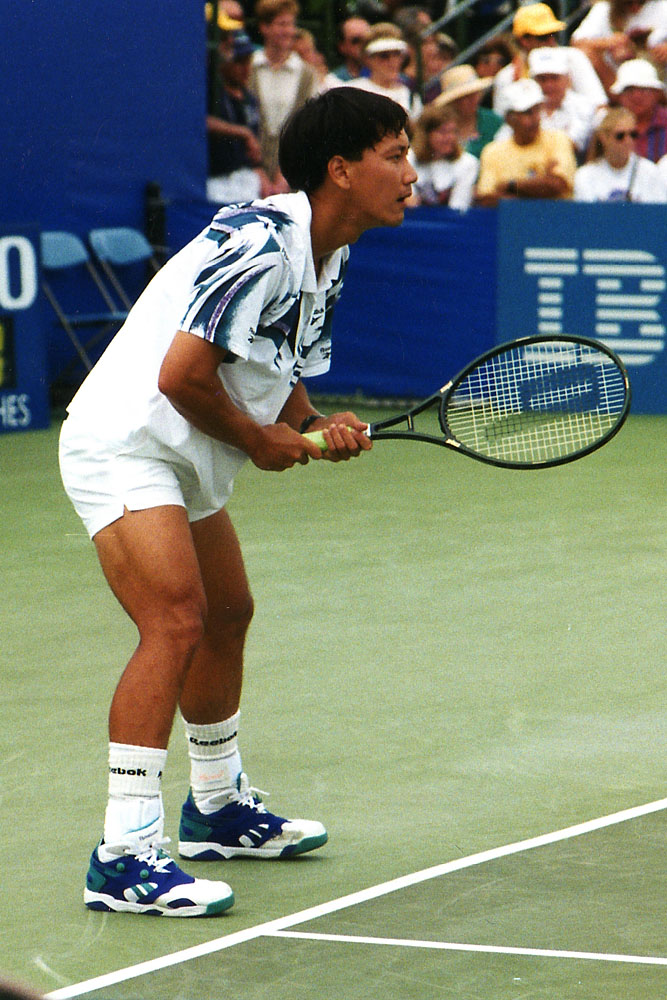
- Chang in 1994
- Country (sports): United States
- Residence: Orange County, California, US
- Born: February 22, 1972 (age 54) Hoboken, New Jersey, US
- Height: 5 ft 9 in (175 cm)
- Turned pro: 1988
- Retired: 2003
- Plays: Right-handed (two-handed backhand)
- Coach: José Higueras (1989); Carl Chang (1992–2003)
- Prize money: US$19,145,632: 40th all-time leader in earnings
- Int. Tennis HoF: 2008 (member page)
- Official website: mchang.com

Singles
- Career record: 662–312 (68%)
- Career titles: 34
- Highest ranking: No. 2 (September 9, 1996)

Grand Slam singles results
- Australian Open: F (1996)
- French Open: W (1989)
- Wimbledon: QF (1994)
- US Open: F (1996)

Other tournaments
- Tour Finals: F (1995)
- Grand Slam Cup: F (1991, 1992)
- Olympic Games: 2R (1992)

Doubles
- Career record: 11–33 (25%)
- Career titles: 0
- Highest ranking: No. 199 (April 19, 1993)

Team competitions
- Davis Cup: W (1990)

Coaching career
- Spouse: Amber Liu Student: Kei Nishikori (2014–2025) Learner Tien (2025–)
- Last updated on: July 5, 2014.

Michael Chang
- Traditional Chinese: 張德培
- Simplified Chinese: 张德培
Transcriptions
Standard Mandarin
- Hanyu Pinyin: Zhāng Dépéi
- IPA: [ʈʂáŋ.tɤ̌ pʰěɪ]
Yue: Cantonese
- Jyutping: Zoeng1 Dak1 Pui4
- IPA: [tsœŋ˥.tɐk̚˥.pʰuj˩]

Michael Te-pei Chang (born February 22, 1972) is an American former professional tennis player and coach. He was ranked world No. 2 by the Association of Tennis Professionals (ATP) in 1996. Chang is the youngest man in history to win a singles major, winning the 1989 French Open at 17 years and 109 days old. He is the first tennis player of Asian descent, male or female, to win a Grand Slam singles title. He won a total of 34 ATP Tour-level singles titles, including seven Masters titles, and was a three-time major runner-up.

Chang was inducted into the International Tennis Hall of Fame in 2008. He coached Kei Nishikori from 2014 to 2025, and currently coaches Learner Tien.

== Early life ==
Michael Te-Pei Chang was born to Joe and Betty Chang on February 22, 1972, in Hoboken, New Jersey. Chang's parents had emigrated to the United States from Taiwan. His father, Joe Chang, had come to the United States to attend graduate school at Stevens Institute of Technology in Hoboken.

After moving from Hoboken to St. Paul, Minnesota, where he learned tennis, Chang and his family moved first to Placentia, California, and then to Encinitas, California, to increase the tennis opportunities for him and his older brother, Carl. Growing up, Chang learned some Chinese from his Taiwanese parents and can speak Mandarin. Betty quit her job as a chemist to travel with Chang on tour. After rising to #163 in the world as a 15-year-old amateur, Chang dropped out of tenth grade at San Dieguito High School in Encinitas to pursue a professional tennis career. He received his GED in February 1988.

== Tennis career ==
=== Junior ===
Chang first came to the tennis world's attention at age 12 as an outstanding junior player who set numerous "youngest-ever" records. At age 12 he also won his first national title, the USTA Junior Hard Court singles. At age 13, he won the Fiesta Bowl 16s. In July 1987, at the age of 15, Chang won another USTA Junior Hard Court singles, beating Pete Sampras in the final, and a month later, in Kalamazoo, he won America’s most prestigious junior event, the United States Nationals U18s tournament, beating Jim Courier in the final. This victory earned him a wildcard for the U.S. Open.

Chang was introduced to tennis by his father Joe, who was his first coach. During his rise in 1989 (including his French Open title), he was coached by José Higueras. For much of his professional career, he was coached by his older brother Carl Chang, who also played in several doubles tournaments with him in the early 1990s.

Chang's success marked the start of an era in which a new generation of American players—which also included Pete Sampras, Jim Courier, and Andre Agassi—would come to dominate the game.

=== Professional ===
On 1 September 1987, at age 15, Chang became the youngest player to win a main draw match at the US Open when he defeated Paul McNamee in four sets (6–3, 6–7, 6–4, 6-4) in the first round. A month later, he reached the semifinals at the Scottsdale Open, to become the youngest player to reach the semifinal stage of a top-level professional tournament.

In 1988, aged 16 years and seven months, he won his first top-level singles title at the Transamerica Open, defeating Johan Kriek in the final. During his title run, Chang registered a 6-4, 6-0 win over Mikael Pernfors, the 1986 French Open finalist who just the previous week had beaten Andre Agassi in the finals of the Los Angeles Open.

==== 1989 French Open ====
Chang's most significant "youngest-ever" record came in 1989 when he won the French Open at the age of 17 years, 110 days, to become the youngest male player ever to win a Grand Slam title. He defeated Stefan Edberg in a five-set final, 6–1, 3–6, 4–6, 6–4, 6–2. Chang thus became the first American man to win the French Open since Tony Trabert in 1955, and the first American man to win a Grand Slam since 1984. Chang's 1989 French Open tournament performance is equally remembered for overcoming significant cramps during an epic fourth-round encounter with Ivan Lendl, who was then the world's No. 1-ranked player, reigning Australian Open champion, and a three-time former French Open champion.

In 1988, Chang had been easily beaten by Lendl in an exhibition match held in Des Moines, Iowa. After the match, Lendl advised Chang, "First off, you've got no serve. And you've certainly got no second serve. You can't hurt me. You can run but you better develop a weapon to survive out here", all weaknesses that Chang worked to improve on.

At the 1989 French Open, Lendl appeared to be on the way to beating Chang after taking the first two sets 6–4, 6–4 and breaking Chang's serve in his opening service game of the third set. However, Chang broke back immediately and went on to claim the third set, 6–3. During the fourth set, Chang experienced a severe attack of leg cramps, and though he won the set to level the match, he considered retiring from the match while up 2–1 in the fifth set. He later said that he felt "an unbelievable conviction in my heart" not to give up, and decided to finish the match. Chang adopted some unusual tactics in an attempt to overcome his cramps. Those tactics included hitting shots high into the air (known as "moon balls") to slow the match down and going for more winners in order to shorten the points. The success of these tactics caused the normally unfazed Lendl to lose his rhythm and also prompted him to swear at the umpire and the crowd, especially after losing a key point in the fifth set when Chang shocked him by delivering an under-arm serve. On match point, Chang stood just behind the service line while waiting to receive Lendl's second serve, a move that was considered suicidal. The tactic worked as the crowd became bemused which in turn caused Lendl to lose his cool and produce a double-fault on his second serve, giving Chang the victory, 4–6, 4–6, 6–3, 6–3, 6–3, in 4 hours and 37 minutes.

Chang subsequently defeated Ronald Agénor in the quarter-final and Andrei Chesnokov in the semi-final. Then seven days after his match against Lendl, after beating Stefan Edberg in five sets, Chang went on to lift the Coupe des Mousquetaires, becoming the youngest Grand Slam men's singles champion history. Chang became the first American man to win the French Open since Tony Trabert in 1955, and the first American man to win a Grand Slam since 1984. In August 1989, Chang became the youngest player to be ranked in the world's top 5.

Chang's match against Lendl was played on June 5, 1989, just one day after the height of the Tiananmen Square Massacre. Chang has frequently noted the impact of the massacre when recalling his French Open victory:

A lot of people forget that Tiananmen Square was going on. The crackdown that happened was on the middle Sunday at the French Open, so if I was not practicing or playing a match, I was glued to the television, watching the events unfold...I often tell people I think it was God's purpose for me to be able to win the French Open the way it was won because I was able to put a smile on Chinese people's faces around the world at a time when there wasn't much to smile about.

Chang would defeat Lendl again in near-duplicate fashion, 2–6, 4–6, 6–4, 7–6 (7–5), 9–7 in a 4-hour, 42-minute semi-final match at the Grand Slam Cup on December 14, 1991.

==== Top five ranked player ====
Chang met Edberg in the semifinals of the US Open in 1992; this time, Edberg won in five sets, 6–7, 7–5, 7–6, 5–7, 6–4. The five-hour, 26-minute match is the second longest in US Open history. Chang reached three further Grand Slam finals after his 1989 French Open triumph, losing the 1995 French Open final to Thomas Muster, the 1996 Australian Open final to Boris Becker, and the 1996 US Open final to Pete Sampras. In the 1995 French Open, he defeated Michael Stich and then two-time defending champion Sergi Bruguera in the semifinals in straight sets, eventually losing to Muster. In both the 1996 Australian and U.S. Opens, he defeated Andre Agassi in the semifinals in straight sets; a win over Sampras at the U.S. Open would have made Chang the no. 1 player in the world. In the 1997 U.S. Open, he was the odds-on favorite to win after Sampras was upset by Petr Korda; however, Chang lost to eventual champion Patrick Rafter in the semifinals in straight sets.

Chang was the first player to be beaten by Roger Federer in the main draw of a Grand Slam tournament, at the 2000 Australian Open. He was also the second player to be beaten by Andy Roddick in the main draw of a Grand Slam tournament, in the second round of the French Open in 2001.

Chang retired from the professional tour in 2003. During his career, he won a total of 34 top-level professional singles titles. His final top-level title was won in 2000 at Los Angeles. His total career prize-money earnings was US$19,145,632. His career-high singles ranking was world no. 2 in 1996, following his US Open finals performance. He was a year-end top-ten player for six consecutive years in the 1990s (1992–1997), a feat matched in the decade only by Pete Sampras. He is one of a few players to win ATP titles in three different decades. His three Indian Wells Masters titles was an ATP record which stood for 15 years, before being eclipsed by Roger Federer in 2012.

=== International play ===
Chang was a key member of the US team which won the Davis Cup in 1990. In the semifinals in Austria, his dramatic comeback from two-sets down against Horst Skoff, 3–6, 6–7, 6–4, 6–4, 6–3, led the US into its first Davis Cup final since 1984. Chang went on to defeat Darren Cahill in straight sets, as the US defeated Australia in the final. He was also on the US team which won the World Team Cup in 1993. His best performance in the year-end singles championship came in 1995, when he defeated Muster, Jim Courier, and then dominated Pete Sampras in the semifinals, before losing in the final to Boris Becker.

Chang represented the US in the 1992 Summer Olympics in Barcelona, reaching the second round before being eliminated by Jaime Oncins. He chose to skip the 1996 Summer Olympics despite the fact that the event was held in Atlanta and that he would have been the tournament's number-one seed (the singles' gold medal was won by Andre Agassi). Chang participated in the 2000 Summer Olympics in Sydney, where he was eliminated in the first round by Sébastien Lareau.

=== Awards and recognition ===
- Chang won the ATP Newcomer of the Year award in 1988.
- Chang was awarded ATP Most Improved Player in 1989.
- In 2008, Chang was inducted into the International Tennis Hall of Fame.
- On May 3, 2009, Chang was honored by the Los Angeles Chinese Historical Society of Southern California in "Celebrating Taiwanese Americans in Sports".

=== Equipment and endorsements ===
Chang signed a multimillion-dollar endorsement deal with Reebok in 1988; he wore Reebok apparel and Reebok Court Victory Pumps shoes during his tennis career and used Prince rackets on court. He started using the Prince "Precision Michael Chang Graphite" 28-inch signature racket in 1994, which was an inch longer than the standard model.

Chang signed endorsement deals with Nissin Foods noodles in 1989, Panasonic and Longines in the 1990s, Cathay Pacific Airlines in 1990, Bristol-Myers Squibb promoting Nuprin in 1991, Stelux watches in 1993, Discover Card in 1996, Tiger Balm, Procter & Gamble (endorsing P&G's Rejoice Shampoo), Eveready Battery Company (endorsing Eveready Alkaline batteries), and Yale locks. In 1997, he signed a multi-year contract to endorse Watch Reebok, a collection of sports watches. A limited edition Michael Chang signature watch was released at Christmas.

== Off-the-court endeavors ==
=== Coaching ===
Chang began coaching Kei Nishikori in 2014. He now coaches Learner Tien as of 2025.

=== Business ventures ===
Chang and his family established CMCB Enterprises, which has real estate holdings including shopping malls, in California, Texas, Arizona and Colorado. In 2003, they bought Dunton Realty Co., a retail brokerage and property management company, and changed its name to Dunton Commercial Real Estate Co. In 2004, they bought SullivanHayes Cos., a retail real estate company in Denver. It was chosen by Denver International Airport to develop a new 17-acre retail project along Peña Boulevard, the airport's main artery.

=== Charity work ===
Chang served as Chairman of ATP Tour Charities in 1994. He has supported grassroots tennis development in Asia through his Stars of the Future program in Hong Kong and the Reebok Challenge across Asia. He was one of five athletes named in the second annual "Most Caring Athlete" list by USA Today Weekend in 1995. In 1997, he was given one of seven Asian-American leadership awards by A Magazine for his status as a role model for Asian-American youth. He has also served as a national spokesman for the National Fish and Wildlife Foundation in the US.

In 2001, Chang served as a goodwill ambassador for the 2008 Beijing Olympic bid committee.

=== Hobbies ===
Chang is an avid fisherman, and often took fishing trips while traveling for tournaments. In his home in Mercer Island, Washington, he set up several fresh-water aquariums, his largest being 240 gallons, eight-feet long by two feet high, which he uses to breed African cichlids among other things.

=== Book ===
In 2002, Chang published a book about his career entitled Holding Serve: Persevering On and Off the Court.

=== Education ===
Chang attended the master's in ministry program at Biola University in La Mirada, California, for a year and a half. He served on Biola's Board of Trustees.

== Personal life ==
On October 18, 2008, Chang married Amber Liu, also a professional tennis player. They have three children, including two daughters. He is a devout Christian.

== Significant finals ==
=== Grand Slam finals ===
==== Singles: 4 (1–3) ====
Result	Year	Championship	Surface	Opponent	Score
Win	1989	French Open	Clay	(Sweden) Stefan Edberg	6–1, 3–6, 4–6, 6–4, 6–2
Loss	1995	French Open	Clay	(Austria) Thomas Muster	5–7, 2–6, 4–6
Loss	1996	Australian Open	Hard	(Germany) Boris Becker	2–6, 4–6, 6–2, 2–6
Loss	1996	US Open	Hard	(United States) Pete Sampras	1–6, 4–6, 6–7^{(3–7)}

=== Year-end championships finals ===
==== Singles: 1 (0–1) ====
Result	Year	Championship	Surface	Opponent	Score
Loss	1995	Frankfurt	Carpet (i)	(Germany) Boris Becker	6–7^{(3–7)}, 0–6, 6–7^{(5–7)}

=== Grand Slam Cup finals ===
==== Singles: 2 (0–2) ====
Result	Year	Championship	Surface	Opponent	Score
Loss	1991	Grand Slam Cup, Munich	Carpet (i)	(United States) David Wheaton	5–7, 2–6, 4–6
Loss	1992	Grand Slam Cup, Munich	Carpet (i)	(Germany) Michael Stich	2–6, 3–6, 2–6

=== Masters Series finals ===
==== Singles: 9 (7–2) ====
Result	Year	Tournament	Surface	Opponent	Score
Win	1990	Canada (Toronto)	Hard	(United States) Jay Berger	4–6, 6–3, 7–6^{(7–2)}
Win	1992	Indian Wells	Hard	(Russia) Andrei Chesnokov	6–3, 6–4, 7–5
Win	1992	Miami	Hard	(Argentina) Alberto Mancini	7–5, 7–5
Win	1993	Cincinnati	Hard	(Sweden) Stefan Edberg	7–5, 0–6, 6–4
Win	1994	Cincinnati	Hard	(Sweden) Stefan Edberg	6–2, 7–5
Loss	1995	Cincinnati	Hard	(United States) Andre Agassi	5–7, 2–6
Win	1996	Indian Wells	Hard	(Netherlands) Paul Haarhuis	7–5, 6–1, 6–1
Loss	1996	Cincinnati	Hard	(United States) Andre Agassi	6–7^{(4–7)}, 4–6
Win	1997	Indian Wells	Hard	(Czech Republic) Bohdan Ulihrach	4–6, 6–3, 6–4, 6–3

== ATP career finals ==
=== Singles: 58 (34 wins / 24 runners-up) ===
Legend Grand Slam (1–3) Year-end championships (0–1) Grand Slam Cup (0–2) ATP Masters Series (7–2) ATP Championship Series (5–4) ATP World Series / Grand Prix (21–12)	Finals by surface Hard (21–15) Clay (4–2) Grass (0–0) Carpet (9–7)	Finals by setting Outdoors (22–14) Indoors (12–10)

Result	W-L	Date	Tournament	Surface	Opponent	Score
Win	1–0	Sep 1988	San Francisco, US	Carpet (i)	(United States) Johan Kriek	6–2, 6–3
Win	2–0	May 1989	French Open, Paris	Clay	(Sweden) Stefan Edberg	6–1, 3–6, 4–6, 6–4, 6–2
Loss	2–1	Sep 1989	Los Angeles, US	Hard	(United States) Aaron Krickstein	6–2, 4–6, 2–6
Win	3–1	Nov 1989	Wembley, UK	Carpet (i)	(France) Guy Forget	6–2, 6–1, 6–1
Win	4–1	Jul 1990	Toronto, Canada	Hard	(United States) Jay Berger	4–6, 6–3, 7–6^{(7–2)}
Loss	4–2	Jul 1990	Los Angeles, US	Hard	(Sweden) Stefan Edberg	6–7^{(4–7)}, 6–2, 6–7^{(3–7)}
Loss	4–3	Nov 1990	Wembley, UK	Carpet (i)	(Switzerland) Jakob Hlasek	6–7^{(7–9)}, 3–6
Win	5–3	Nov 1991	Birmingham, UK	Carpet (i)	(France) Guillaume Raoux	6–3, 6–2
Loss	5–4	Dec 1991	Grand Slam Cup, Munich	Carpet (i)	(United States) David Wheaton	5–7, 2–6, 4–6
Win	6–4	Feb 1992	San Francisco, US	Hard (i)	(United States) Jim Courier	6–3, 6–3
Win	7–4	Mar 1992	Indian Wells, US	Hard	(Russia) Andrei Chesnokov	6–3, 6–4, 7–5
Win	8–4	Mar 1992	Miami, US	Hard	(Argentina) Alberto Mancini	7–5, 7–5
Loss	8–5	Apr 1992	Hong Kong, UK	Hard	(United States) Jim Courier	5–7, 3–6
Loss	8–6	Dec 1992	Grand Slam Cup, Munich, Germany	Carpet (i)	(Germany) Michael Stich	2–6, 3–6, 2–6
Win	9–6	Jan 1993	Jakarta, Indonesia	Hard	(Germany) Carl-Uwe Steeb	2–6, 6–2, 6–1
Win	10–6	Mar 1993	Osaka, Japan	Hard	(Israel) Amos Mansdorf	6–4, 6–4
Loss	10–7	Aug 1993	Los Angeles, US	Hard	(Netherlands) Richard Krajicek	6–0, 6–7^{(3–7)}, 6–7^{(5–7)}
Win	11–7	Aug 1993	Cincinnati, US	Hard	(Sweden) Stefan Edberg	7–5, 0–6, 6–4
Loss	11–8	Aug 1993	Long Island, US	Hard	(Switzerland) Marc Rosset	4–6, 6–3, 1–6
Win	12–8	Sep 1993	Kuala Lumpur, Malaysia	Hard (i)	(Sweden) Jonas Svensson	6–0, 6–4
Win	13–8	Oct 1993	Beijing, China	Carpet (i)	(Canada) Greg Rusedski	7–6^{(7–5)}, 6–7^{(6–8)}, 6–4
Win	14–8	Jan 1994	Jakarta, Indonesia	Hard	(Czech Republic) David Rikl	6–3, 6–3
Loss	14–9	Jan 1994	San Jose, US	Hard (i)	(Italy) Renzo Furlan	6–3, 2–6, 5–7
Win	15–9	Feb 1994	Philadelphia, US	Carpet (i)	(Netherlands) Paul Haarhuis	6–3, 6–2
Loss	15–10	Apr 1994	Tokyo, Japan	Hard	(United States) Pete Sampras	4–6, 2–6
Win	16–10	Apr 1994	Hong Kong, UK	Hard	(Australia) Patrick Rafter	6–1, 6–3
Win	17–10	Apr 1994	Atlanta, US	Clay	(United States) Todd Martin	6–7^{(4–7)}, 7–6^{(7–4)}, 6–0
Win	18–10	Aug 1994	Cincinnati, US	Hard	(Sweden) Stefan Edberg	6–2, 7–5
Loss	18–11	Oct 1994	Tokyo, Japan	Carpet (i)	(Croatia) Goran Ivanišević	4–6, 4–6
Win	19–11	Oct 1994	Beijing, China	Carpet (i)	(Sweden) Anders Järryd	7–5, 7–5
Loss	19–12	Feb 1995	San Jose, US	Hard (i)	(United States) Andre Agassi	2–6, 6–1, 3–6
Loss	19–13	Feb 1995	Philadelphia, US	Carpet (i)	(Sweden) Thomas Enqvist	6–0, 4–6, 0–6
Win	20–13	Apr 1995	Hong Kong, UK	Hard	(Sweden) Jonas Björkman	6–3, 6–1
Win	21–13	May 1995	Atlanta, US	Clay	(United States) Andre Agassi	6–2, 6–7^{(6–8)}, 6–4
Loss	21–14	May 1995	French Open, Paris, France	Clay	(Austria) Thomas Muster	5–7, 2–6, 4–6
Loss	21–15	Aug 1995	Cincinnati, US	Hard	(United States) Andre Agassi	5–7, 2–6
Win	22–15	Oct 1995	Tokyo, Japan	Carpet (i)	(Australia) Mark Philippoussis	6–3, 6–4
Win	23–15	Oct 1995	Beijing, China	Carpet (i)	(Italy) Renzo Furlan	7–5, 6–3
Loss	23–16	Nov 1995	Tennis Masters Cup, Frankfurt	Carpet (i)	(Germany) Boris Becker	6–7^{(3–7)}, 0–6, 6–7^{(5–7)}
Loss	23–17	Jan 1996	Australian Open, Melbourne	Hard	(Germany) Boris Becker	2–6, 4–6, 6–2, 2–6
Win	24–17	Mar 1996	Indian Wells, US	Hard	(Netherlands) Paul Haarhuis	7–5, 6–1, 6–1
Loss	24–18	Apr 1996	Hong Kong, UK	Hard	(United States) Pete Sampras	4–6, 6–3, 4–6
Win	25–18	Jul 1996	Washington, D.C., US	Hard	(South Africa) Wayne Ferreira	6–2, 6–4
Win	26–18	Jul 1996	Los Angeles, US	Hard	(Netherlands) Richard Krajicek	6–4, 6–3
Loss	26–19	Aug 1996	Cincinnati, US	Hard	(United States) Andre Agassi	6–7^{(4–7)}, 4–6
Loss	26–20	Aug 1996	US Open, New York City	Hard	(United States) Pete Sampras	1–6, 4–6, 6–7^{(3–7)}
Loss	26–21	Sep 1996	Singapore	Carpet (i)	(United States) Jonathan Stark	4–6, 4–6
Win	27–21	Feb 1997	Memphis, US	Hard (i)	(Australia) Todd Woodbridge	6–3, 6–4
Win	28–21	Mar 1997	Indian Wells, US	Hard	(Czech Republic) Bohdan Ulihrach	4–6, 6–3, 6–4, 6–3
Win	29–21	Apr 1997	Hong Kong, UK	Hard	(Australia) Patrick Rafter	6–3, 6–3
Win	30–21	Apr 1997	Orlando, US	Clay	(South Africa) Grant Stafford	4–6, 6–2, 6–1
Win	31–21	Jul 1997	Washington, D.C., US	Hard	(Czech Republic) Petr Korda	5–7, 6–2, 6–1
Loss	31–22	Feb 1998	Memphis, US	Hard (i)	(Australia) Mark Philippoussis	3–6, 2–6
Loss	31–23	Apr 1998	Orlando, US	Clay	(United States) Jim Courier	5–7, 6–3, 5–7
Win	32–23	Aug 1998	Boston, US	Hard	(Netherlands) Paul Haarhuis	6–3, 6–4
Win	33–23	Oct 1998	Shanghai, China	Carpet (i)	(Croatia) Goran Ivanišević	4–6, 6–1, 6–2
Loss	33–24	Jan 2000	Auckland, New Zealand	Hard	(Sweden) Magnus Norman	6–3, 3–6, 5–7
Win	34–24	Jul 2000	Los Angeles, US	Hard	(United States) Jan-Michael Gambill	6–7^{(2–7)}, 6–3, ret.

== Singles performance timeline ==
Key
W	F	SF	QF	#R	RR	Q#	DNQ	A	NH

(W) winner; (F) finalist; (SF) semifinalist; (QF) quarterfinalist; (#R) rounds 4, 3, 2, 1; (RR) round-robin stage; (Q#) qualification round; (DNQ) did not qualify; (A) absent; (NH) not held; (SR) strike rate (events won / competed); (W–L) win–loss record.

Tournament	1987	1988	1989	1990	1991	1992	1993	1994	1995	1996	1997	1998	1999	2000	2001	2002	2003	W–L	SR
Grand Slam tournaments
Australian Open	A	A	A	A	A	3R	2R	A	SF	F	SF	2R	2R	1R	1R	1R	A	21–10	0 / 10
French Open	A	3R	W	QF	QF	3R	2R	3R	F	3R	4R	3R	1R	3R	2R	1R	1R	38–15	1 / 16
Wimbledon	A	2R	4R	4R	1R	1R	3R	QF	2R	1R	1R	2R	A	2R	2R	2R	A	18–14	0 / 14
US Open	2R	4R	4R	3R	4R	SF	QF	4R	QF	F	SF	2R	2R	2R	1R	2R	1R	43–17	0 / 17
Win–loss	1–1	6–3	13–2	9–3	7–3	9–4	8–4	9–3	16–4	14–4	13–4	5–4	2–3	4–4	2–4	2–4	0–2	120–56	1 / 57
Olympic Games
Summer Olympics	NH	A	Not Held			2R	Not Held			A	Not Held			1R	Not Held			1–2	0 / 2
Year-end championship
Tennis Masters Cup	DNQ		RR	DNQ		RR	RR	RR	F	RR	RR	Did not qualify						7–16	0 / 7
Grand Slam Cup	Not Held			SF	F	F	QF	QF	1R	Did not qualify				Not Held				10–6	0 / 6
Grand Prix				ATP Masters Series															
Indian Wells Masters	A	1R	QF	A	QF	W	SF	3R	3R	W	W	A	1R	2R	1R	1R	1R	28–11	3 / 14
Miami Masters	A	A	A	A	3R	W	1R	3R	2R	QF	2R	A	1R	2R	2R	1R	2R	18–11	1 / 12
Monte-Carlo Masters	A	A	A	A	A	A	A	A	A	1R	A	A	A	1R	1R	A	A	0–3	0 / 3
Rome Masters	A	A	A	1R	A	QF	SF	2R	QF	A	1R	QF	2R	2R	2R	A	A	17–10	0 / 10
Hamburg Masters	A	A	A	1R	A	2R	1R	A	A	A	A	2R	1R	1R	2R	A	A	3–7	0 / 7
Canada Masters	A	A	A	W	1R	A	3R	3R	QF	A	SF	A	3R	2R	1R	A	A	15–8	1 / 9
Cincinnati Masters	A	QF	QF	QF	3R	SF	W	W	F	F	SF	2R	QF	1R	2R	3R	1R	41–14	2 / 16
Stuttgart Masters^{1}	A	A	A	3R	A	A	A	2R	2R	SF	2R	1R	2R	QF	Q1	A	A	9–8	0 / 8
Paris Masters	A	A	QF	1R	SF	2R	3R	SF	QF	3R	2R	1R	SF	3R	A	A	A	18–12	0 / 12
Runners-up	0	0	1	2	1	2	2	3	5	5	0	2	0	1	0	0	0	24	
Titles	0	1	2	1	1	3	5	6	4	3	5	2	0	1	0	0	0	34	
Overall win-loss	4–4	23–13	47–17	36–21	47–20	57–23	66–21	66–21	65–19	65–19	57–21	35–17	30–22	42–26	16–21	7–16	2–10	662–312	
Year-end ranking	163	30	5	15	15	6	8	6	5	2	3	29	50	32	94	124	383		

^{1} Held as Stockholm Masters until 1994, Stuttgart Masters from 1995 to 2001.

== Top 10 wins ==
Season	1987	1988	1989	1990	1991	1992	1993	1994	1995	1996	1997	1998	1999	2000	2001	2002	2003	Total
Wins	0	0	3	2	4	6	5	8	6	7	5	1	2	1	0	1	0	51

#	Player	Rank	Event	Surface	Rd	Score	Chang rank
1989
1.	(Sweden) Stefan Edberg	5	Indian Wells, United States	Hard	3R	6–3, 6–2	25
2.	(Czechoslovakia) Ivan Lendl	1	French Open, Paris, France	Clay	4R	4–6, 4–6, 6–3, 6–3, 6–3	19
3.	(Sweden) Stefan Edberg	3	French Open, Paris, France	Clay	F	6–1, 3–6, 4–6, 6–4, 6–2	19
1990
4.	(United States) Andre Agassi	4	Toronto, Canada	Hard	QF	4–6, 7–5, 7–5	24
5.	(Sweden) Stefan Edberg	1	Grand Slam Cup, Munich, Germany	Carpet (i)	1R	6–4, 4–6, 7–5	15
1991
6.	(France) Guy Forget	7	French Open, Paris, France	Clay	4R	6–1, 6–1, 4–6, 6–3	10
7.	(Sweden) Stefan Edberg	1	Paris, France	Carpet (i)	3R	2–6, 6–1, 6–4	21
8.	(United States) Jim Courier	2	Grand Slam Cup, Munich, Germany	Carpet (i)	1R	6–4, 6–2	15
9.	(Czechoslovakia) Ivan Lendl	5	Grand Slam Cup, Munich, Germany	Carpet (i)	SF	2–6, 4–6, 6–4, 7–6^{(7–5)}, 9–7	15
1992
10.	(United States) Jim Courier	2	San Francisco, United States	Hard (i)	F	6–3, 6–3	16
11.	(United States) Pete Sampras	4	Miami, United States	Hard	QF	6–4, 7–6^{(7–4)}	9
12.	(United States) Jim Courier	1	Miami, United States	Hard	SF	6–2, 6–4	9
13.	(United States) Andre Agassi	9	Grand Slam Cup, Munich, Germany	Carpet (i)	1R	6–4, 6–2	6
14.	(Czechoslovakia) Petr Korda	7	Grand Slam Cup, Munich, Germany	Carpet (i)	QF	6–3, 6–4	6
15.	(Croatia) Goran Ivanišević	4	Grand Slam Cup, Munich, Germany	Carpet (i)	SF	6–7^{(3–7)}, 6–2, 6–4, 3–6, 6–3	6
1993
16.	(Czech Republic) Petr Korda	6	Indian Wells, United States	Hard	QF	6–1, 6–3	5
17.	(Sweden) Stefan Edberg	3	Cincinnati, United States	Hard	F	7–5, 0–6, 6–4	9
18.	(Spain) Sergi Bruguera	5	Long Island, United States	Hard	QF	3–6, 6–1, 6–2	7
19.	(Sweden) Stefan Edberg	3	Long Island, United States	Hard	SF	6–1, 6–2	7
20.	(United States) Jim Courier	2	ATP Tour World Championships, Frankfurt, Germany	Carpet (i)	RR	6–4, 6–0	7
1994
21.	(United States) Jim Courier	3	Philadelphia, United States	Carpet (i)	SF	7–6^{(8–6)}, 6–2	9
22.	(United States) Todd Martin	9	Atlanta, United States	Clay	F	6–7^{(4–7)}, 7–6^{(7–4)}, 6–0	7
23.	(Spain) Sergi Bruguera	4	Wimbledon, London, United Kingdom	Grass	4R	6–4, 7–6^{(9–7)}, 6–0	8
24.	(Sweden) Stefan Edberg	4	Cincinnati, United States	Hard	F	6–2, 7–5	7
25.	(United States) Todd Martin	7	Tokyo, Japan	Carpet (i)	QF	6–3, 7–6^{(8–6)}	9
26.	(Croatia) Goran Ivanišević	2	Paris, France	Carpet (i)	QF	3–6, 6–4, 7–6^{(7–4)}	9
27.	(Spain) Alberto Berasategui	7	ATP Tour World Championships, Frankfurt, Germany	Carpet (i)	RR	6–1, 6–0	6
28.	(Spain) Alberto Berasategui	8	Grand Slam Cup, Munich, Germany	Carpet (i)	1R	6–1, 7–5	6
1995
29.	(United States) Andre Agassi	1	Atlanta, United States	Clay	F	6–2, 6–7^{(6–8)}, 6–4	6
30.	(Spain) Sergi Bruguera	7	French Open, Paris, France	Clay	SF	6–4, 7–6^{(7–5)}, 7–6^{(7–0)}	6
31.	(Germany) Michael Stich	8	Cincinnati, United States	Hard	SF	4–6, 6–2, 7–6^{(7–5)}	5
32.	(Austria) Thomas Muster	3	ATP Tour World Championships, Frankfurt, Germany	Carpet (i)	RR	4–6, 6–2, 6–3	4
33.	(United States) Jim Courier	7	ATP Tour World Championships, Frankfurt, Germany	Carpet (i)	RR	6–2, 7–5	4
34.	(United States) Pete Sampras	1	ATP Tour World Championships, Frankfurt, Germany	Carpet (i)	SF	6–4, 6–4	4
1996
35.	(United States) Andre Agassi	2	Australian Open, Melbourne, Australia	Hard	SF	6–1, 6–4, 7–6^{(7–1)}	5
36.	(United States) Andre Agassi	3	Indian Wells, United States	Hard	QF	6–7^{(3–7)}, 6–2, 6–1	5
37.	(Netherlands) Richard Krajicek	8	Los Angeles, United States	Hard	F	6–4, 6–3	3
38.	(Croatia) Goran Ivanišević	6	Cincinnati, United States	Hard	QF	6–3, 7–5	3
39.	(United States) Andre Agassi	9	US Open, New York, United States	Hard	SF	6–3, 6–2, 6–2	3
40.	(Chile) Marcelo Ríos	10	Stuttgart, Germany	Carpet (i)	QF	6–4, 6–3	2
41.	(Croatia) Goran Ivanišević	4	ATP Tour World Championships, Hanover, Germany	Carpet (i)	RR	6–7^{(8–10)}, 7–6^{(7–5)}, 6–1	2
1997
42.	(Austria) Thomas Muster	2	Indian Wells, United States	Hard	SF	6–1, 7–6^{(7–1)}	3
43.	(Brazil) Gustavo Kuerten	10	Cincinnati, United States	Hard	QF	6–1, 6–2	2
44.	(Chile) Marcelo Ríos	10	US Open, New York, United States	Hard	QF	7–5, 6–2, 4–6, 4–6, 6–3	2
45.	(Australia) Pat Rafter	3	Davis Cup, Washington, D.C., United States	Hard	RR	6–4, 1–6, 6–3, 6–4	2
46.	(Spain) Sergi Bruguera	8	ATP Tour World Championships, Hanover, Germany	Hard	RR	7–6^{(10–8)}, 6–2	2
1998
47.	(United States) Pete Sampras	1	Rome, Italy	Clay	3R	6–2, 7–6^{(8–6)}	14
1999
48.	(Spain) Àlex Corretja	8	Cincinnati, United States	Hard	2R	6–3, 6–7^{(5–7)}, 6–2	58
49.	(Chile) Marcelo Ríos	8	Paris, France	Carpet (i)	2R	7–5, 6–2	72
2000
50.	(Spain) Àlex Corretja	9	Stuttgart, Germany	Hard (i)	2R	1–6, 7–5, 6–0	24
2002
51.	(Germany) Tommy Haas	3	Cincinnati, United States	Hard	1R	6–3, 6–2	111

== Records ==
- Youngest Grand Slam champion, winning French Open, at 17 years, 3 months old (1989).
- Youngest Grand Slam finalist, playing French Open final, at 17 years, 3 months old (1989).
- Youngest ever male player to be ranked ATP top-5, at 17 years, 5 months old (1989).
- Youngest ever male player to be ranked ATP top-5 at the end of the season, at 17 years, 10 months old (1989).
- Youngest ever male player to be ranked ATP top-10 at the end of the season, at 17 years, 10 months old (1989).

Awards and achievements
Preceded by (United States) Andre Agassi	ATP Most Improved Player; 1989	Succeeded by (United States) Pete Sampras
