= 1992 Volvo Tennis/Los Angeles – Singles =

Singles
- 1992 Volvo Tennis/Los Angeles

Final
- Champion: (Netherlands) Richard Krajicek
- Runner-up: (Australia) Mark Woodforde
- Score: 6–4, 2–6, 6–4

Details
- Draw: 32 (4Q / 3WC)
- Seeds: 8

Events
Singles	Doubles
← 1991 ·	Los Angeles Open	· 1993 →

Pete Sampras was the defending champion, but did not compete this year.

Richard Krajicek won the title by defeating Mark Woodforde 6–4, 2–6, 6–4 in the final.

== Seeds ==
1. (United States) Aaron Krickstein (semifinals, retired)
2. (Netherlands) Richard Krajicek (champion)
3. (United States) Brad Gilbert (second round)
4. (Commonwealth of Independent States) Alexander Volkov (second round)
5. (United States) Derrick Rostagno (second round)
6. (United States) Jimmy Connors (quarterfinals)
7. (United States) David Wheaton (second round)
8. (Italy) Gianluca Pozzi (quarterfinals)

== Draw ==
=== Key ===
- Q = Qualifier
- WC = Wild card
- LL = Lucky loser
- Alt = Alternate
- SE = Special exempt
- PR = Protected ranking
- ITF = ITF entry
- JE = Junior exempt
- w/o = Walkover
- r = Retired
- d = Defaulted
- SR = Special ranking

=== Finals ===
Semifinals
1	(United States) Aaron Krickstein	2^{r}
(Australia) Mark Woodforde	4
(Australia) Sandon Stolle	2	4
2	(Netherlands) Richard Krajicek	6	6

Final
(Australia) Mark Woodforde	4	6	4
2	(Netherlands) Richard Krajicek	6	2	6

=== Top half ===
First round
1	(United States) A Krickstein	4	6	6
Q	(United States) P Crow	6	1	2
(United States) T Witsken	6	6
(Spain) G López	3	4
(United States) B Shelton	4	4
(United States) T Martin	6	6
Q	(Sweden) J Carlsson	4	5
8	(Italy) G Pozzi	6	7
4	(Commonwealth of Independent States) A Volkov	7^{7}	6
(Australia) J Stoltenberg	6^{2}	3
(Australia) M Woodforde	6	6
(United Kingdom) J Bates	3	2
WC	(Sweden) B Borg	4	2
(Canada) C Pridham	6	6
Q	(United States) D Randall	6	2	3
6/WC	(United States) J Connors	4	6	6

Second round
1	(United States) A Krickstein	6	6^{5}	6
(United States) T Witsken	3	7^{7}	4
(United States) T Martin	7^{7}	3	2
8	(Italy) G Pozzi	6^{5}	6	6
4	(Commonwealth of Independent States) A Volkov	3	4
(Australia) M Woodforde	6	6
(Canada) C Pridham	6	3	4
6/WC	(United States) J Connors	2	6	6

Quarterfinals
1	(United States) A Krickstein	6	6
8	(Italy) G Pozzi	1	2
(Australia) M Woodforde	6	4	6
6/WC	(United States) J Connors	4	6	4

Semifinals
1	(United States) A Krickstein	2^{r}
(Australia) M Woodforde	4

=== Bottom half ===
First round
5	(United States) D Rostagno	6	6
(Brazil) D Marcelino	3	4
(United States) R Reneberg	6	7^{7}
Q	(United States) R Leach	1	6^{3}
(Australia) S Stolle	7	4	7
(Mexico) L Herrera	5	6	5
(United States) J Grabb	4	6	1
3	(United States) B Gilbert	6	3	6
7	(United States) D Wheaton	7	6
(United States) J Stark	5	3
WC	(United States) M Joyce	6	3	6^{1}
(United States) J Tarango	2	6	7^{7}
(United States) F Montana	6^{5}	1
(Zimbabwe) B Black	7^{7}	6
(Australia) S Youl	4	5
2	(Netherlands) R Krajicek	6	7

Second round
5	(United States) D Rostagno	1	6^{2}
(United States) R Reneberg	6	7^{7}
(Australia) S Stolle	4	7^{7}	6
3	(United States) B Gilbert	6	6^{3}	3
7	(United States) D Wheaton	4	6	6^{5}
(United States) J Tarango	6	4	7^{7}
(Zimbabwe) B Black	3	3
2	(Netherlands) R Krajicek	6	6

Quarterfinals
(United States) R Reneberg	4	4
(Australia) S Stolle	6	6
(United States) J Tarango	7^{7}	0	1^{r}
2	(Netherlands) R Krajicek	6^{4}	6	3

Semifinals
(Australia) S Stolle	2	4
2	(Netherlands) R Krajicek	6	6
