= Patrick Crowe (disambiguation) =

Patrick Crowe may refer to:

- Pat Crowe (1869–1938), American criminal and writer
- Patrick Crowe (1892–1969), Irish politician
- Pat Crow (born 1966), American former professional tennis player
- Pat Crowley (1933–2025), American actress
- Pat Crowley (1933–2013), Irish fashion designer
- Pat Crowley (1923–1981), New Zealand rugby union player
