= 1994 Los Angeles Open =

- Date: August 1–8
- Edition: 68th
- Category: ATP World Series
- Draw: 32S / 16D
- Prize money: $313,750
- Surface: Hard / outdoor
- Location: Los Angeles, U.S.
- Venue: Los Angeles Tennis Center

Champions

Singles
- (Germany) Boris Becker

Doubles
- (Australia) John Fitzgerald / (Australia) Mark Woodforde
← 1993 ·	Los Angeles Open	· 1995 →

The 1994 Los Angeles Open was a men's tennis tournament held on outdoor hardcourts at the Los Angeles Tennis Center in Los Angeles, California in the United States that was part of the World Series category of the 1994 ATP Tour. It was the 68th edition of the tournament and was held from August 1, 1994, through August 8, 1995. Second-seeded Boris Becker won the singles title.

== Finals ==
=== Singles ===
(Germany) Boris Becker defeated (Australia) Mark Woodforde 6–2, 6–2

- It was Becker's 2nd singles title of the year and the 40th of his career.

=== Doubles ===
(Australia) John Fitzgerald / (Australia) Mark Woodforde defeated (United States) Scott Davis / (United States) Brian MacPhie 4–6, 6–2, 6–0
