= 1992 Volvo Tennis/Los Angeles =

- Date: August 3–9
- Edition: 66th
- Category: ATP World Series
- Draw: 32S / 16D
- Prize money: $235,000
- Surface: Hard / outdoor
- Location: Los Angeles, U.S.
- Venue: Los Angeles Tennis Center

Champions

Singles
- (Netherlands) Richard Krajicek

Doubles
- (United States) Patrick Galbraith / (United States) Jim Pugh
← 1991 ·	Los Angeles Open	· 1993 →

The 1992 Volvo Tennis/Los Angeles was a men's tennis tournament held on outdoor hardcourts at the Los Angeles Tennis Center in Los Angeles, California in the United States that was part of the World Series category of the 1992 ATP Tour. It was the 66th edition of the tournament and was held from August 3, 1992 through August 9, 1992. Second-seeded Richard Krajicek won the singles title at the event and earned $33,800 first-prize money.

== Finals ==
=== Singles ===
(Netherlands) Richard Krajicek defeated (Australia) Mark Woodforde 6–4, 2–6, 6–4

- It was Krajicek's 1st and only singles title of the year and the 2nd of his career.

=== Doubles ===
(United States) Patrick Galbraith / (United States) Jim Pugh defeated (United States) Francisco Montana / (United States) David Wheaton 7–6, 7–6

== See also ==
- 1992 Virginia Slims of Los Angeles – women's tournament
