= 1991 Volvo Tennis/Los Angeles – Doubles =

Doubles
- 1991 Volvo Tennis/Los Angeles

Final
- Champions: (Argentina) Javier Frana (United States) Jim Pugh
- Runners-up: (Canada) Glenn Michibata (United States) Brad Pearce
- Score: 7–5, 2–6, 6–4

Details
- Draw: 16
- Seeds: 4

Events
Singles	Doubles
← 1990 ·	Los Angeles Open	· 1992 →

Scott Davis and David Pate were the defending champions, but lost in the first round to Glenn Michibata and Brad Pearce.

Javier Frana and Jim Pugh won the title by defeating Michibata and Pearce 7–5, 2–6, 6–4 in the final.

== Seeds ==
1. (United States) Scott Davis / (United States) David Pate (first round)
2. (Australia) Todd Woodbridge / (Australia) Mark Woodforde (quarterfinals)
3. (South Africa) Gary Muller / (South Africa) Danie Visser (first round)
4. (Argentina) Javier Frana / (United States) Jim Pugh (champions)

== Draw ==
=== Key ===
- Q = Qualifier
- WC = Wild card
- LL = Lucky loser
- Alt = Alternate
- SE = Special exempt
- PR = Protected ranking
- ITF = ITF entry
- JE = Junior exempt
- w/o = Walkover
- r = Retired
- d = Defaulted
- SR = Special ranking

=== Draw ===
First round
1	(United States) S Davis (United States) D Pate	2	7	4
(Canada) G Michibata (United States) B Pearce	6	5	6
WC	(United States) J Canter (United States) T Nelson	3	6	6
(United States) P Annacone (Australia) J Stoltenberg	6	3	7
3	(South Africa) G Muller (South Africa) D Visser	6	2
(Sweden) S Edberg (United States) P Sampras	7	6
(United Kingdom) N Broad (South Africa) S Kruger	3	6
(South Africa) W Ferreira (South Africa) P Norval	6	7
(Sweden) P Lundgren (United States) S Patridge	4	7	6
(United States) S Cannon (The Bahamas) R Smith	6	6	3
Q	(Italy) G Pozzi (Italy) S Pescosolido	6	1
4	(Argentina) J Frana (United States) J Pugh	7	6
(United States) S DeVries (Australia) D Macpherson	6	0
(United States) C Beckman (United States) S Salumaa	7	6
(United States) J Brown (United States) B Garnett	3	4
2	(Australia) T Woodbridge (Australia) M Woodforde	6	6

Quarterfinals
(Canada) G Michibata (United States) B Pearce	6	6
(United States) P Annacone (Australia) J Stoltenberg	4	2
(Sweden) S Edberg (United States) P Sampras	3	6	3
(South Africa) W Ferreira (South Africa) P Norval	6	3	6
(Sweden) P Lundgren (United States) S Patridge	7	3	6
4	(Argentina) J Frana (United States) J Pugh	6	6	7
(United States) C Beckman (United States) S Salumaa	7	7
2	(Australia) T Woodbridge (Australia) M Woodforde	5	5

Semifinals
(Canada) G Michibata (United States) B Pearce	7	6
(South Africa) W Ferreira (South Africa) P Norval	6	4
4	(Argentina) J Frana (United States) J Pugh	6	6
(United States) C Beckman (United States) S Salumaa	4	4

Final
(Canada) G Michibata (United States) B Pearce	5	6	4
4	(Argentina) J Frana (United States) J Pugh	7	2	6
