= 1997 Infiniti Open =

- Date: July 21–27
- Edition: 70th
- Category: World Series
- Draw: 32S / 16D
- Prize money: $303,000
- Surface: Hard / outdoor
- Location: Los Angeles, California, US
- Venue: Los Angeles Tennis Center

Champions

Singles
- (United States) Jim Courier

Doubles
- (Canada) Sébastien Lareau / (United States) Alex O'Brien
← 1996 ·	Los Angeles Open	· 1998 →

The 1997 Infiniti Open was a men's tennis tournament played on outdoor hard courts at the Los Angeles Tennis Center in Los Angeles, California in the United States that was part of the World Series of the 1997 ATP Tour. It was the 70th edition of the tournament and was held from July 21 through July 27, 1997. Sixth-seeded Jim Courier won the singles title.

== Finals ==
=== Singles ===
(United States) Jim Courier defeated (Sweden) Thomas Enqvist 6–4, 6–4

- It was Courier's 2nd singles title of the year and the 21st of his career.

=== Doubles ===
(Canada) Sébastien Lareau / (United States) Alex O'Brien defeated (India) Mahesh Bhupathi / (United States) Rick Leach 7–6, 6–4
