= 1993 Volvo Tennis/Los Angeles – Doubles =

Los Angeles Open (tennis)

Doubles
- 1993 Volvo Tennis/Los Angeles

Final
- Champions: (South Africa) Wayne Ferreira (Germany) Michael Stich
- Runners-up: (Canada) Grant Connell (United States) Scott Davis
- Score: 7–6, 7–6

Details
- Draw: 16
- Seeds: 4

Events
Singles	Doubles
← 1992 ·	Los Angeles Open	· 1994 →

Patrick Galbraith and Jim Pugh were the defending champions, but Galbraith did not compete this year. Pugh teamed up with Brad Pearce and reached the semifinals before losing to Grant Connell and Scott Davis.

Wayne Ferreira and Michael Stich won the title by defeating Connell and Davis 7–6, 7–6 in the final.

== Seeds ==
1. (United States) Luke Jensen / (United States) Murphy Jensen (quarterfinals)
2. (Zimbabwe) Byron Black / (United States) Rick Leach (first round)
3. (Netherlands) Jacco Eltingh / (Netherlands) Richard Krajicek (quarterfinals, withdrew)
4. (United States) Shelby Cannon / (United States) Scott Melville (first round)

== Draw ==
=== Key ===
- Q = Qualifier
- WC = Wild card
- LL = Lucky loser
- Alt = Alternate
- SE = Special exempt
- PR = Protected ranking
- ITF = ITF entry
- JE = Junior exempt
- w/o = Walkover
- r = Retired
- d = Defaulted
- SR = Special ranking

=== Draw ===
First round
1	(United States) L Jensen (United States) M Jensen	6	6
(South Africa) S Kruger (South Africa) B Talbot	4	3
(United States) B Pearce (United States) J Pugh	7	7
(Canada) G Michibata (United States) D Pate	5	5
3	(Netherlands) J Eltingh (Netherlands) R Krajicek	7	7
(Australia) J Stoltenberg (Australia) M Woodforde	6	6
(Canada) G Connell (United States) S Davis	6	7
WC	(United States) B Gilbert (United States) B MacPhie	4	6
WC	(United States) D DiLucia (United States) A O'Brien	1	4
Q	(Australia) A Kratzmann (South Africa) D Nainkin	6	6
(United States) M Briggs (United States) K Jones	6	4	7
4	(United States) S Cannon (United States) S Melville	4	6	5
(Norway) BO Pedersen (United States) G Van Emburgh	6	6
(South Africa) JL de Jager (South Africa) R Deppe	3	4
(South Africa) W Ferreira (Germany) M Stich	6	6
2	(Zimbabwe) B Black (United States) R Leach	3	4

Quarterfinals
1	(United States) L Jensen (United States) M Jensen	6	5	6
(United States) B Pearce (United States) J Pugh	3	7	7
3	(Netherlands) J Eltingh (Netherlands) R Krajicek
(Canada) G Connell (United States) S Davis	w/o
Q	(Australia) A Kratzmann (South Africa) D Nainkin	2	4
(United States) M Briggs (United States) K Jones	6	6
(Norway) BO Pedersen (United States) G Van Emburgh	4	3
(South Africa) W Ferreira (Germany) M Stich	6	6

Semifinals
(United States) B Pearce (United States) J Pugh	3	7	3
(Canada) G Connell (United States) S Davis	6	6	6
(United States) M Briggs (United States) K Jones	6	4
(South Africa) W Ferreira (Germany) M Stich	7	6

Final
(Canada) G Connell (United States) S Davis	6	6
(South Africa) W Ferreira (Germany) M Stich	7	7
