= 1991 Volvo Tennis/Los Angeles =

- Date: July 29 – August 4
- Edition: 65th
- Category: ATP World Series
- Draw: 32S / 16D
- Prize money: $225,000
- Surface: Hard / outdoor
- Location: Los Angeles, U.S.
- Venue: Los Angeles Tennis Center

Champions

Singles
- (United States) Pete Sampras

Doubles
- (Argentina) Javier Frana / (United States) Jim Pugh
← 1990 ·	Los Angeles Open	· 1992 →

The 1991 Volvo Tennis/Los Angeles was a men's tennis tournament held on outdoor hardcourts at the Los Angeles Tennis Center in Los Angeles, California in the United States that was part of the World Series category of the 1991 ATP Tour. It was the 65th edition of the tournament and was held from July 29, 1991 through August 4, 1991. Second-seeded Pete Sampras won the singles title.

== Finals ==
=== Singles ===
(United States) Pete Sampras defeated (United States) Brad Gilbert 6–2, 6–7^{(5–7)}, 6–3

- It was Sampras' 1st singles title of the year and the 5th of his career.

=== Doubles ===
(Argentina) Javier Frana / (United States) Jim Pugh defeated (Canada) Glenn Michibata / (United States) Brad Pearce 7–5, 2–6, 6–4

== See also ==
- 1991 Virginia Slims of Los Angeles – women's tournament
