= 1997 Infiniti Open – Singles =

Men's tennis tournament played on Hardcourt in Los Angeles

Singles
- 1997 Infiniti Open

Final
- Champion: (United States) Jim Courier
- Runner-up: (Sweden) Thomas Enqvist
- Score: 6–4, 6–4

Details
- Draw: 32 (4 Q )
- Seeds: 8

Events
Singles	Doubles
← 1996 ·	Los Angeles Open	· 1998 →

The 1997 Infiniti Open was a men's tennis tournament played on Hardcourt in Los Angeles, United States that was part of the World Series of the 1997 ATP Tour. It was the seventieth edition of the tournament and was held from July 21 through July 27, 1997.

Michael Chang did not return to defend his title, as he opted to rest in order to compete at Montreal in the following week.

Jim Courier won the title by defeating Thomas Enqvist 6–4, 6–4 in the final.

== Seeds ==
Champion seeds are indicated in bold text while text in italics indicates the round in which those seeds were eliminated.

1. (Croatia) Goran Ivanišević (semifinals)
2. (Sweden) Thomas Enqvist (final)
3. (Australia) Mark Philippoussis (quarterfinals)
4. (Netherlands) Richard Krajicek (quarterfinals)
5. (Australia) Patrick Rafter (second round)
6. (United States) **Jim Courier (champion)**
7. (United States) Andre Agassi (first round)
8. (United States) Alex O'Brien (first round)

== Draw ==
=== Key ===
- Q = Qualifier
- WC = Wild card
- LL = Lucky loser
- Alt = Alternate
- SE = Special exempt
- PR = Protected ranking
- ITF = ITF entry
- JE = Junior exempt
- w/o = Walkover
- r = Retired
- d = Defaulted
- SR = Special ranking

=== Finals ===
Semifinals
1	(Croatia) Goran Ivanišević	3	4
6	**(United States) Jim Courier**	**6**	**6**
(France) Guillaume Raoux	4	1
2	**(Sweden) Thomas Enqvist**	**6**	**6**

Final
6	**(United States) Jim Courier**	**6**	**6**
2	(Sweden) Thomas Enqvist	4	4

=== Top half ===
First round
1	**(Croatia) G Ivanišević**	**7**	**6**
(South Africa) N Godwin	6	3
**(France) O Delaître**	**6**	**6**
(Israel) E Ran	4	4
**(Zimbabwe) B Black**	**6**	**6**
(United States) D Flach	2	0
**(United States) J Gimelstob**	**7**	**6**
7	(United States) A Agassi	5	2
4	**(Netherlands) R Krajicek**	**6**	**6**
(South Africa) M Ondruska	4	4
Q	**(United States) G Weiner**	**6**	**6**
Q	(United States) B Bryan	4	3
(Canada) D Nestor	6	6
Q	**(India) M Bhupathi**	**7**	**7**
(South Africa) G Stafford	5	5
6	**(United States) J Courier**	**7**	**7**

Second round
1	**(Croatia) G Ivanišević**	**7**	**7**
(France) O Delaître	5	6
**(Zimbabwe) B Black**	**6**	**7**
(United States) J Gimelstob	2	6
4	**(Netherlands) R Krajicek**	**7**	5	**7**
Q	(United States) G Weiner	5	**7**	6
Q	(India) M Bhupathi	6	3
6	**(United States) J Courier**	**7**	**6**

Quarterfinals
1	**(Croatia) G Ivanišević**	**7**	**6**
(Zimbabwe) B Black	6	2
4	(Netherlands) R Krajicek	6	5
6	**(United States) J Courier**	**7**	**7**

Semifinals
1	(Croatia) G Ivanišević	3	4
6	**(United States) J Courier**	**6**	**6**

=== Bottom half ===
First round
5	**(Australia) P Rafter**	**7**	6	**6**
(France) L Roux	6	**7**	3
(Argentina) G Etlis	3	4
**(France) G Raoux**	**6**	**6**
**(Australia) S Stolle**	2	**6**	**7**
Q	(Australia) M Tebbutt	**6**	3	6
(Brazil) R Jabali	**6**	3	6
3	**(Australia) M Philippoussis**	1	**6**	**7**
8	(United States) A O'Brien	4	3
**(Armenia) S Sargsian**	**6**	**6**
(Canada) S Lareau	6	1
**(Denmark) K Carlsen**	**7**	**6**
**(United States) V Spadea**	**6**	**6**
(France) S Simian	4	2
(United States) S Bryan	3	2
2	**(Sweden) T Enqvist**	**6**	**6**

Second round
5	(Australia) P Rafter	4	6
**(France) G Raoux**	**6**	**7**
(Australia) S Stolle	**6**	4	3
3	**(Australia) M Philippoussis**	3	**6**	**6**
(Armenia) S Sargsian	4	**6**	3
**(Denmark) K Carlsen**	**6**	3	**6**
(United States) V Spadea	6	1
2	**(Sweden) T Enqvist**	**7**	**6**

Quarterfinals
**(France) G Raoux**	**7**	**6**
3	(Australia) M Philippoussis	6	4
(Denmark) K Carlsen	3	5
2	**(Sweden) T Enqvist**	**6**	**7**

Semifinals
(France) G Raoux	4	1
2	**(Sweden) T Enqvist**	**6**	**6**
