= 1996 Infiniti Open – Doubles =

Doubles
- 1996 Infiniti Open

Final
- Champions: (South Africa) Marius Barnard (South Africa) Piet Norval
- Runners-up: (Sweden) Jonas Björkman (Sweden) Nicklas Kulti
- Score: 7–5, 6–2

Details
- Draw: 16
- Seeds: 4

Events
Singles	Doubles
← 1995 ·	Los Angeles Open	· 1997 →

The 1996 Infiniti Open was a doubles tennis event in 1996.

Brent Haygarth and Kent Kinnear were the defending champions, but they competed with different partners that year namely, Haygarth with Lan Bale and Kinnear with Dave Randall.

Bale and Haygarth lost in the first round to Kelly Jones and Matt Lucena. Kinnear and Randall lost in the quarterfinals to Marius Barnard and Piet Norval. Barnard and Norval won in the final, with a score of 7–5, 6–2 against Jonas Björkman and Nicklas Kulti.

== Seeds ==
1. (Sweden) Jonas Björkman / (Sweden) Nicklas Kulti (final)
2. (France) Guillaume Raoux / (Netherlands) Jan Siemerink (first round)
3. (Australia) Paul Kilderry / (Australia) Patrick Rafter (semifinals)
4. (United States) Trevor Kronemann / (United States) Brian MacPhie (first round)

== Draw ==
=== Key ===
- Q = Qualifier
- WC = Wild card
- LL = Lucky loser
- Alt = Alternate
- SE = Special exempt
- PR = Protected ranking
- ITF = ITF entry
- JE = Junior exempt
- w/o = Walkover
- r = Retired
- d = Defaulted
- SR = Special ranking

First round
1	(Sweden) J Björkman (Sweden) N Kulti	6	2	6
(United States) S Davis (Australia) S Stolle	4	6	4
WC	(United States) B Bryan (United States) M Bryan	4	6
Q	(United States) K Evans (United States) M Joyce	6	7
3	(Australia) P Kilderry (Australia) P Rafter	4	6	6
(Hungary) L Markovits (Venezuela) N Pereira	6	3	2
(United States) K Jones (United States) M Lucena	6	7
(South Africa) L Bale (South Africa) B Haygarth	1	5
(United States) L Jensen (United States) M Jensen	3	5
(United States) K Kinnear (United States) D Randall	6	7
(South Africa) M Barnard (South Africa) P Norval	6	6
4	(United States) T Kronemann (United States) B MacPhie	3	3
WC	(United States) J Gimelstob (Federal Republic of Yugoslavia) S Muškatirović	7	6	6
(Canada) G Michibata (The Bahamas) R Smith	5	7	7
WC	(United States) J Leach (United States) R Leach	6	6	7
2	(France) G Raoux (Netherlands) J Siemerink	4	7	6

Quarterfinals
1	(Sweden) J Björkman (Sweden) N Kulti	6	6
Q	(United States) K Evans (United States) M Joyce	2	4
3	(Australia) P Kilderry (Australia) P Rafter	5	7	7
(United States) K Jones (United States) M Lucena	7	6	6
(United States) K Kinnear (United States) D Randall	7	3	2
(South Africa) M Barnard (South Africa) P Norval	5	6	6
(Canada) G Michibata (The Bahamas) R Smith	6	7
WC	(United States) J Leach (United States) R Leach	2	6

Semifinals
1	(Sweden) J Björkman (Sweden) N Kulti	6	6
3	(Australia) P Kilderry (Australia) P Rafter	3	2
(South Africa) M Barnard (South Africa) P Norval	6	3	6
(Canada) G Michibata (The Bahamas) R Smith	3	6	1

Final
1	(Sweden) J Björkman (Sweden) N Kulti	5	2
(South Africa) M Barnard (South Africa) P Norval	7	6
