= 1994 Los Angeles Open – Doubles =

Doubles
- 1994 Los Angeles Open

Final
- Champion: (Australia) John Fitzgerald (Australia) Mark Woodforde
- Runner-up: (United States) Scott Davis (United States) Brian MacPhie
- Score: 4–6, 6–2, 6–0

Details
- Draw: 16
- Seeds: 4

Events
Singles	Doubles
← 1993 ·	Los Angeles Open	· 1995 →

The 1994 Los Angeles Open – Doubles was an event of the 1994 Los Angeles Open men's tennis tournament and was played on outdoor hardcourts at the Los Angeles Tennis Center in Los Angeles, California in the United States from August 1, 1994, through August 8, 1995. The draw consisted of 16 teams and four of them were seeded. Wayne Ferreira and Michael Stich were the defending Los Angeles Open doubles champions but did not compete in this edition. The first-seeded team of John Fitzgerald and Mark Woodforde won the title by defeating the unseeded pairing Scott Davis and Brian MacPhie in the final, 4–6, 6–2, 6–0.

== Seeds ==
1. (Australia) John Fitzgerald / (Australia) Mark Woodforde (champions)
2. (United States) Brad Pearce / (United States) Jim Pugh (first round)
3. (South Africa) Lan Bale / (South Africa) Piet Norval (first round)
4. (Czech Republic) David Rikl / (United States) Bryan Shelton (first round)

== Draw ==
=== Key ===
- Q = Qualifier
- WC = Wild card
- LL = Lucky loser
- Alt = Alternate
- ITF = ITF entry
- PR = Protected ranking
- SR = Special ranking
- SE = Special exempt
- JE = Junior exempt
- JR = Junior Accelerator Programme entrant
- CO = College Accelerator Programme entrant
- NG = Next Gen Accelerator Program entrant
- w/o = Walkover
- r = Retired
- d = Defaulted

First Round
1	(Australia) John Fitzgerald (Australia) Mark Woodforde	7	4	7
(United States) Mike Bauer (Mexico) Jorge Lozano	6	6	5
(Germany) Boris Becker (United Kingdom) Greg Rusedski	6	4	6
(Australia) Mark Kratzmann (United States) David Pate	4	6	1
3	(South Africa) Lan Bale (South Africa) Piet Norval	3	6	6
(Sweden) Rikard Bergh (United States) Michael Briggs	6	3	7
(Argentina) Juan Garat (Venezuela) Maurice Ruah	6	6
(United States) Chuck Adams (United States) Jeff Tarango	3	3
(United States) Brett Hansen-Dent (United States) Peter Jeschke	7	3	3
(South Africa) Brent Haygarth (United Kingdom) Mark Petchey	6	6	6
(Australia) Andrew Kratzmann (United States) Scott Melville	7	7
4	(Czech Republic) David Rikl (United States) Bryan Shelton	6	6
(Germany) Karsten Braasch (Russia) Alexander Volkov	5	6
(United States) Scott Davis (United States) Brian MacPhie	7	7
(United States) Luke Jensen (United States) Murphy Jensen	6	7
2	(United States) Brad Pearce (United States) Jim Pugh	2	5

Quarterfinals
1	(Australia) John Fitzgerald (Australia) Mark Woodforde	w/o
(Germany) Boris Becker (United Kingdom) Greg Rusedski
(Sweden) Rikard Bergh (United States) Michael Briggs	2	3
(Argentina) Juan Garat (Venezuela) Maurice Ruah	6	6
(South Africa) Brent Haygarth (United Kingdom) Mark Petchey	6	7
(Australia) Andrew Kratzmann (United States) Scott Melville	4	6
(United States) Scott Davis (United States) Brian MacPhie	6	3	6
(United States) Luke Jensen (United States) Murphy Jensen	4	6	3

Semifinals
1	(Australia) John Fitzgerald (Australia) Mark Woodforde	6	6
(Argentina) Juan Garat (Venezuela) Maurice Ruah	3	2
(South Africa) Brent Haygarth (United Kingdom) Mark Petchey	6	6	6
(United States) Scott Davis (United States) Brian MacPhie	7	3	7

Final
1	(Australia) John Fitzgerald (Australia) Mark Woodforde	4	6	6
(United States) Scott Davis (United States) Brian MacPhie	6	2	0
