= 1997 Infiniti Open – Doubles =

Doubles
- 1997 Infiniti Open

Final
- Champions: (Canada) Sébastien Lareau (United States) Alex O'Brien
- Runners-up: (India) Mahesh Bhupathi (United States) Rick Leach
- Score: 7–6, 6–4

Details
- Draw: 16
- Seeds: 4

Events
Singles	Doubles
← 1996 ·	Los Angeles Open	· 1998 →

The 1997 Infiniti Open was a men's tennis tournament played on hardcourt in Los Angeles, United States that was part of the World Series of the 1997 ATP Tour. It was the seventieth edition of the tournament and was held from 21 – 27 July 1997.

Marius Barnard and Piet Norval were the defending champions, but none competed this year. Norval opted to rest in order to compete at Montreal the following week.

Sébastien Lareau and Alex O'Brien won the title by defeating Mahesh Bhupathi and Rick Leach 7–6, 6–4 in the final.

== Seeds ==
1. (Canada) Sébastien Lareau / (United States) Alex O'Brien (champions)
2. (Australia) Mark Philippoussis / (Australia) Patrick Rafter (semifinals)
3. (Czech Republic) Cyril Suk / (Australia) Sandon Stolle (semifinals)
4. (India) Mahesh Bhupathi / (United States) Rick Leach (final)

== Draw ==
=== Key ===
- Q = Qualifier
- WC = Wild card
- LL = Lucky loser
- Alt = Alternate
- SE = Special exempt
- PR = Protected ranking
- ITF = ITF entry
- JE = Junior exempt
- w/o = Walkover
- r = Retired
- d = Defaulted
- SR = Special ranking

=== Draw ===
First round
1	(Canada) S Lareau (United States) A O'Brien	6	6
(United States) J Gimelstob (United States) B MacPhie	4	2
(Sweden) R Bergh (France) O Delaître	3	7	5
(United States) L Jensen (United States) M Jensen	6	5	7
3	(Australia) S Stolle (Czech Republic) C Suk	3	7	6
WC	(United States) B Bryan (United States) M Bryan	6	6	2
(United States) K Kinnear (North Macedonia) A Kitinov	7	3	6
Q	(France) G Raoux (France) S Simian	5	6	3
(United States) S Davis (United States) K Jones	1	2
(South Africa) M Ondruska (South Africa) G Stafford	6	6
(Netherlands) S Groen (Croatia) G Ivanišević	7	5	1^{r}
4	(India) M Bhupathi (United States) R Leach	6	7	2
WC	(United States) D Flach (United States) P McEnroe	7	2	6
WC	(Australia) L Smith (Philippines) E Taino	5	6	3
(United States) B Coupe (The Bahamas) R Smith	6	4
2	(Australia) M Philippoussis (Australia) P Rafter	7	6

Quarterfinals
1	(Canada) S Lareau (United States) A O'Brien	6	6	6
(United States) L Jensen (United States) M Jensen	4	7	2
3	(Australia) S Stolle (Czech Republic) C Suk	7	7
(United States) K Kinnear (North Macedonia) A Kitinov	6	6
(South Africa) M Ondruska (South Africa) G Stafford	3	4
4	(India) M Bhupathi (United States) R Leach	6	6
WC	(United States) D Flach (United States) P McEnroe	6	3	4
2	(Australia) M Philippoussis (Australia) P Rafter	3	6	6

Semifinals
1	(Canada) S Lareau (United States) A O'Brien	w/o
3	(Australia) S Stolle (Czech Republic) C Suk
4	(India) M Bhupathi (United States) R Leach	7	7
2	(Australia) M Philippoussis (Australia) P Rafter	6	5

Final
1	(Canada) S Lareau (United States) A O'Brien	7	6
4	(India) M Bhupathi (United States) R Leach	6	4
