= 1995 Infiniti Open – Singles =

Singles
- 1995 Infiniti Open

Final
- Champion: (Germany) Michael Stich
- Runner-up: (Sweden) Thomas Enqvist
- Score: 6–7^{(7–9)}, 7–6^{(7–4)}, 6–2

Details
- Draw: 32 (3WC/4Q/1LL)
- Seeds: 8

Events
Singles	Doubles
← 1994 ·	Los Angeles Open	· 1996 →

Boris Becker was the defending champion, but did not compete this year.

Michael Stich won the title by defeating Thomas Enqvist 6–7^{(7–9)}, 7–6^{(7–4)}, 6–2 in the final.

== Seeds ==
1. (Croatia) Goran Ivanišević (semifinals)
2. (Germany) Michael Stich (champion)
3. (United States) Jim Courier (second round)
4. (n/a)
5. (Sweden) Thomas Enqvist (final)
6. (Australia) Mark Woodforde (first round)
7. (Russia) Alexander Volkov (quarterfinals)
8. (New Zealand) Brett Steven (first round)

== Draw ==
=== Key ===
- Q = Qualifier
- WC = Wild card
- LL = Lucky loser
- Alt = Alternate
- SE = Special exempt
- PR = Protected ranking
- ITF = ITF entry
- JE = Junior exempt
- w/o = Walkover
- r = Retired
- d = Defaulted
- SR = Special ranking

=== Finals ===
Semifinals
1	(Croatia) Goran Ivanišević	7^{7}	4	4
5	(Sweden) Thomas Enqvist	6^{3}	6	6
(Switzerland) Jakob Hlasek	2	4
2	(Germany) Michael Stich	6	6

Final
5	(Sweden) Thomas Enqvist	7^{9}	6^{4}	2
2	(Germany) Michael Stich	6^{7}	7^{7}	6

=== Top half ===
First round
1	(Croatia) G Ivanišević	6	6
(Denmark) K Carlsen	2	4
(United Kingdom) M Petchey	2	4
(United States) J Grabb	6	6
Q	(United States) J Pugh	6^{5}	7^{7}	6^{7}
(Australia) M Philippoussis	7^{7}	6^{4}	7^{9}
(South Africa) M Ondruska	1	6	6
8	(New Zealand) B Steven	6	3	3
3/WC	(United States) J Courier	6	6
Q	(Mexico) A Hernández	3	2
(Kenya) P Wekesa	1	4
(United States) M Joyce	6	6
WC	(United States) J Connors	4	4
(Italy) C Caratti	6	6
(Colombia) M Hadad	1	2
5	(Sweden) T Enqvist	6	6

Second round
1	(Croatia) G Ivanišević	6	6
(United States) J Grabb	4	2
(Australia) M Philippoussis	3	6	3
(South Africa) M Ondruska	6	1	6
3/WC	(United States) J Courier	6^{4}	5
(United States) M Joyce	7^{7}	7
(Italy) C Caratti	2	6^{2}
5	(Sweden) T Enqvist	6	7^{7}

Quarterfinals
1	(Croatia) G Ivanišević	2	6	6
(South Africa) M Ondruska	6	1	3
(United States) M Joyce	6	1	1
5	(Sweden) T Enqvist	1	6	6

Semifinals
1	(Croatia) G Ivanišević	7^{7}	4	4
5	(Sweden) T Enqvist	6^{3}	6	6

=== Bottom half ===
First round
6	(Australia) M Woodforde	3	6	2
(Japan) S Matsuoka	6	2	6
(Switzerland) J Hlasek	4	6	7
(Spain) J Burillo	6	1	5
(Australia) P Rafter	6	5	6
(Australia) P Kilderry	3	7	4
Q	(Mexico) L Herrera	4	6	6
LL	(Mexico) I Martínez	6	4	3
7	(Russia) A Volkov	7	6
(United Kingdom) G Rudesdki	5	4
WC	(United States) D Rostagno	6	6
Q	(United States) K Kinnear	3	3
(United States) J Tarango	6	6
(United States) V Spadea	2	3
(Italy) G Pozzi	4	2
2	(Germany) M Stich	6	6

Second round
(Japan) S Matsuoka	3	6	6^{5}
(Switzerland) J Hlasek	6	4	7^{7}
(Australia) P Rafter	7	6
Q	(Mexico) L Herrera	5	1
7	(Russia) A Volkov	6	1	6
WC	(United States) D Rostagno	4	6	4
(United States) J Tarango	3	3
2	(Germany) M Stich	6	6

Quarterfinals
(Switzerland) J Hlasek	6^{1}	6	7^{7}
(Australia) P Rafter	7^{7}	4	6^{5}
7	(Russia) A Volkov	3	2
2	(Germany) M Stich	6	6

Semifinals
(Switzerland) J Hlasek	2	4
2	(Germany) M Stich	6	6
