= 1996 Infiniti Open =

- Date: July 29 – August 4
- Edition: 69th
- Category: World Series
- Draw: 32S / 16D
- Prize money: $303,000
- Surface: Hard / outdoor
- Location: Los Angeles, California, US
- Venue: Los Angeles Tennis Center

Champions

Singles
- (United States) Michael Chang

Doubles
- (South Africa) Marius Barnard / (South Africa) Piet Norval
← 1995 ·	Los Angeles Open	· 1997 →

The 1996 Infiniti Open was a men's tennis tournament played on outdoor hard courts at the Los Angeles Tennis Center in Los Angeles, California in the United States and was part of the World Series of the 1996 ATP Tour. It was the 69th edition of the tournament and ran from July 29 through August 4, 1996. First-seeded Michael Chang won the singles title.

== Finals ==
=== Singles ===
(United States) Michael Chang defeated (Netherlands) Richard Krajicek 6–4, 6–3

- It was Chang's 3rd singles title of the year and the 26th of his career.

=== Doubles ===
(South Africa) Marius Barnard / (South Africa) Piet Norval defeated (Sweden) Jonas Björkman / (Sweden) Nicklas Kulti 7–5, 6–2

- It was Barnard's 3rd title of the year and the 5th of his career. It was Norval's 2nd title of the year and the 7th of his career.
