= 1998 Mercedes-Benz Cup – Doubles =

Doubles
- 1998 Mercedes-Benz Cup

Final
- Champions: (Australia) Patrick Rafter (Australia) Sandon Stolle
- Runners-up: (United States) Jeff Tarango (Czech Republic) Daniel Vacek
- Score: 6–4, 6–4

Details
- Draw: 16
- Seeds: 4

Events
Singles	Doubles
← 1997 ·	Los Angeles Open	· 1999 →

The 1998 Mercedes-Benz Cup was a men's tennis tournament played on hardcourt in Los Angeles, United States that was part of the International Series of the 1998 ATP Tour. It was the seventy-first edition of the tournament and was held from July 27 through August 2, 1998.

== Seeds ==
Champion seeds are indicated in bold text while text in italics indicates the round in which those seeds were eliminated.

1. (Zimbabwe) Wayne Black / (Canada) Sébastien Lareau (first round)
2. Unknown (withdrew)
3. (Australia) **Patrick Rafter** / (Australia) **Sandon Stolle (champions)**
4. (South Africa) John-Laffnie de Jager / (South Africa) Robbie Koenig (semifinals)

== Draw ==
=== Key ===
- Q = Qualifier
- WC = Wild card
- LL = Lucky loser
- Alt = Alternate
- SE = Special exempt
- PR = Protected ranking
- ITF = ITF entry
- JE = Junior exempt
- w/o = Walkover
- r = Retired
- d = Defaulted
- SR = Special ranking

=== Finals ===
First round
1	(Zimbabwe) W Black (Canada) S Lareau	**7**	4	4
(United States) **J Tarango** **(Czech Republic) D Vacek**	6	**6**	**6**
(Croatia) **G Ivanišević** **(Australia) P Kilderry**	**7**	**6**
(United States) D Flach (Australia) M Tebbutt	6	4
4	(South Africa) **J-L de Jager** **(South Africa) R Koenig**	**6**	4	**6**
(United States) B Bryan (United States) M Bryan	1	**6**	3
(United States) **A Peterson** **(United States) E Taino**	4	**6**	**6**
(United States) L Jensen (United States) M Jensen	**6**	3	2
(South Africa) **G Stafford** **(South Africa) K Ullyett**	**6**	**6**
(United States) B Coupe (United States) K Kinnear	3	3
3	(Australia) **P Rafter** **(Australia) S Stolle**	**7**	**7**
(Finland) T Ketola (Mexico) D Roditi	6	6
(South Africa) **W Ferreira** **(South Africa) M Ondruska**	**7**	**6**
(Zimbabwe) W Black (United States) P Galbraith	6	3
(Czech Republic) **M Damm** **(United States) J Grabb**	**6**	**6**
(United States) J-M Gambill (United States) V Spadea	4	2

Quarterfinals
(United States) **J Tarango** **(Czech Republic) D Vacek**	w/o
(Croatia) G Ivanišević (Australia) P Kilderry
4	(South Africa) **J-L de Jager** **(South Africa) R Koenig**	5	**6**	**6**
(United States) A Peterson (United States) E Taino	**7**	4	3
(South Africa) G Stafford (South Africa) K Ullyett	5	3
3	(Australia) **P Rafter** **(Australia) S Stolle**	**7**	**6**
(South Africa) W Ferreira (South Africa) M Ondruska	3	1
(Czech Republic) **M Damm** **(United States) J Grabb**	**6**	**6**

Semifinals
(United States) **J Tarango** **(Czech Republic) D Vacek**	**7**	**6**
4	(South Africa) J-L de Jager (South Africa) R Koenig	6	3
3	(Australia) **P Rafter** **(Australia) S Stolle**	**7**	**6**
(Czech Republic) M Damm (United States) J Grabb	6	4

Final
(United States) J Tarango (Czech Republic) D Vacek	4	4
3	(Australia) **P Rafter** **(Australia) S Stolle**	**6**	**6**
