= 1996 Infiniti Open – Singles =

Singles
- 1996 Infiniti Open

Final
- Champion: (United States) Michael Chang
- Runner-up: (Netherlands) Richard Krajicek
- Score: 6–4, 6–3

Details
- Draw: 32 (4 Q / 2 WC )
- Seeds: 8

Events
Singles	Doubles
← 1995 ·	Los Angeles Open	· 1997 →

Michael Stich was the defending champion but lost in the first round to Scott Draper.

First-seeded Michael Chang won in the final 6–4, 6–3 against second-seeded Richard Krajicek.

== Seeds ==
1. (United States) Michael Chang (champion)
2. (Netherlands) Richard Krajicek (final)
3. (Sweden) Thomas Enqvist (second round)
4. (Germany) Michael Stich (first round)
5. (Netherlands) Jan Siemerink (second round)
6. (Sweden) Stefan Edberg (semifinals)
7. (Sweden) Nicklas Kulti (first round)
8. (Sweden) Jonas Björkman (quarterfinals)

== Draw ==
=== Key ===
- Q = Qualifier
- WC = Wild card
- LL = Lucky loser
- Alt = Alternate
- SE = Special exempt
- PR = Protected ranking
- ITF = ITF entry
- JE = Junior exempt
- w/o = Walkover
- r = Retired
- d = Defaulted
- SR = Special ranking

First round
1	(United States) M Chang	6	6
(Colombia) M Hadad	2	1
(Morocco) H Arazi	4	2
(Czech Republic) M Damm	6	6
(Italy) S Pescosolido	6	6
Q	(Venezuela) M Ruah	2	1
Q	(France) A Dupuis	6	2	6
7	(Sweden) N Kulti	4	6	3
4	(Germany) M Stich	3	4
(Australia) S Draper	6	6
(United States) M Joyce	7^{7}	6
(United States) D Wheaton	6^{4}	4
WC	(United States) J Stark	7^{7}	6
WC	(United States) J Gimelstob	6^{2}	4
LL	(New Zealand) S Downs	2	4
6	(Sweden) S Edberg	6	6
5	(Netherlands) J Siemerink	6	7^{7}
(Slovakia) K Kučera	3	6^{5}
(Ecuador) L Morejón	2	7^{7}	6^{3}
(Australia) S Stolle	6	6^{0}	7^{7}
Q	(United States) A O'Brien	6	6
(Venezuela) N Pereira	2	3
WC	(United States) C Mamiit	7^{7}	2	3
3	(Sweden) T Enqvist	6^{1}	6	6
8	(Sweden) J Björkman	6	6
(Italy) C Caratti	2	3
(Australia) P Rafter	7^{7}	6
(United States) V Spadea	6^{4}	4
(France) G Raoux	4	6	6
Q	(United States) D Caldwell	6	2	1
(Slovakia) J Krošlák	5	6	4
2	(Netherlands) R Krajicek	7	4	6

Second round
1	(United States) M Chang	6	3	7
(Czech Republic) M Damm	0	6	5
(Italy) S Pescosolido	6	6
Q	(France) A Dupuis	3	2
(Australia) S Draper	6	1	6
(United States) M Joyce	4	6	0
WC	(United States) J Stark	2	6^{4}
6	(Sweden) S Edberg	6	7^{7}
5	(Netherlands) J Siemerink	3	7^{7}	2
(Australia) S Stolle	6	6^{1}	6
Q	(United States) A O'Brien	6	4	7
3	(Sweden) T Enqvist	4	6	5
8	(Sweden) J Björkman	6	3	6
(Australia) P Rafter	3	6	3
(France) G Raoux	6	3	3
2	(Netherlands) R Krajicek	3	6	6

Quarterfinals
1	(United States) M Chang	6	6
(Italy) S Pescosolido	2	2
(Australia) S Draper	3	4
6	(Sweden) S Edberg	6	6
(Australia) S Stolle	6	6
Q	(United States) A O'Brien	4	3
8	(Sweden) J Björkman	6	5	3
2	(Netherlands) R Krajicek	3	7	6

Semifinals
1	(United States) M Chang	6	6
6	(Sweden) S Edberg	3	2
(Australia) S Stolle	3	1
2	(Netherlands) R Krajicek	6	6

Final
1	(United States) Michael Chang	6	6
2	(Netherlands) Richard Krajicek	4	3
