= 1995 Infiniti Open – Doubles =

Doubles
- 1995 Infiniti Open

Final
- Champions: (South Africa) Brent Haygarth (United States) Kent Kinnear
- Runners-up: (United States) Scott Davis (Croatia) Goran Ivanišević
- Score: 6–4, 7–6

Details
- Draw: 16
- Seeds: 4

Events
Singles	Doubles
← 1994 ·	Los Angeles Open	· 1996 →

John Fitzgerald and Mark Woodforde were the defending champions, but lost in the quarterfinals to Mark Philippoussis and Patrick Rafter.

Brent Haygarth and Kent Kinnear won the title by defeating Scott Davis and Goran Ivanišević 6–4, 7–6 in the final.

== Seeds ==
1. (Australia) John Fitzgerald / (Australia) Mark Woodforde (quarterfinals)
2. (South Africa) David Adams / (United States) Jeff Tarango (first round)
3. (United States) Rick Leach / (United States) Scott Melville (quarterfinals)
4. (South Africa) Piet Norval / (South Africa) Marcos Ondruska (semifinals)

== Draw ==
=== Key ===
- Q = Qualifier
- WC = Wild card
- LL = Lucky loser
- Alt = Alternate
- SE = Special exempt
- PR = Protected ranking
- ITF = ITF entry
- JE = Junior exempt
- w/o = Walkover
- r = Retired
- d = Defaulted
- SR = Special ranking

=== Draw ===
First round
1	(Australia) J Fitzgerald (Australia) M Woodforde	7	6
(United States) B MacPhie (Canada) G Rusedski	6	2
(Australia) M Philippoussis (Australia) P Rafter	5	6	6
(Switzerland) J Hlasek (Germany) M Stich	7	3	4
3	(United States) R Leach (United States) S Melville	6	6
(United Kingdom) N Broad (South Africa) D Visser	3	2
WC	(United States) J Pugh (United States) D Rostagno	4	4
(South Africa) B Haygarth (United States) K Kinnear	6	6
(United States) K Jones (United States) D Pate	6	6	6
WC	(United States) M Joyce (United States) V Spadea	7	3	4
Q	(United States) A Nathan (Kenya) P Wekesa	3	7	3
4	(South Africa) P Norval (South Africa) M Ondruska	6	5	6
WC	(United States) J Connors (United States) J Courier	3	6
(Australia) A Florent (Australia) P Kilderry	6	7
(United States) S Davis (Croatia) G Ivanišević	7	6
2	(South Africa) D Adams (United States) J Tarango	6	4

Quarterfinals
1	(Australia) J Fitzgerald (Australia) M Woodforde	6	4
(Australia) M Philippoussis (Australia) P Rafter	7	6
3	(United States) R Leach (United States) S Melville	5	6	4
(South Africa) B Haygarth (United States) K Kinnear	7	2	6
(United States) K Jones (United States) D Pate	3	4
4	(South Africa) P Norval (South Africa) M Ondruska	6	6
(Australia) A Florent (Australia) P Kilderry	1	6	6
(United States) S Davis (Croatia) G Ivanišević	6	1	7

Semifinals
(Australia) M Philippoussis (Australia) P Rafter	4	6
(South Africa) B Haygarth (United States) K Kinnear	6	7
4	(South Africa) P Norval (South Africa) M Ondruska	6	5
(United States) S Davis (Croatia) G Ivanišević	7	7

Final
(South Africa) B Haygarth (United States) K Kinnear	6	7
(United States) S Davis (Croatia) G Ivanišević	4	6
