= 1994 Los Angeles Open – Singles =

Singles
- 1994 Los Angeles Open

Final
- Champion: (West Germany) Boris Becker
- Runner-up: (Australia) Mark Woodforde
- Score: 6–2, 6–2

Details
- Draw: 32 (3WC / 4Q)
- Seeds: 8

Events
Singles	Doubles
← 1993 ·	Los Angeles Open	· 1995 →

The 1994 Los Angeles Open – Singles was an event of the 1994 Los Angeles Open men's tennis tournament and was played on outdoor hardcourts at the Los Angeles Tennis Center in Los Angeles, California in the United States from August 1, 1994, through August 8, 1995. The draw comprised 32 players and eight of them were seeded. Fifth-seeded Richard Krajicek was the defending Los Angeles Open singles champion but he lost in the semifinals. Second-seeded Boris Becker won the title by defeating unseeded Mark Woodforde in the final, 6–2, 6–2.

== Seeds ==
1. (United States) Michael Chang (first round)
2. (Germany) Boris Becker (champion)
3. (United States) Andre Agassi (quarterfinals)
4. (Russia) Alexander Volkov (second round)
5. (Netherlands) Richard Krajicek (semifinals)
6. (Australia) Jason Stoltenberg (semifinals)
7. (United States) Brad Gilbert (first round)
8. (Germany) Karsten Braasch (quarterfinals)

== Draw ==
=== Key ===
- Q = Qualifier
- WC = Wild card
- LL = Lucky loser
- Alt = Alternate
- ITF = ITF entry
- PR = Protected ranking
- SR = Special ranking
- SE = Special exempt
- JE = Junior exempt
- JR = Junior Accelerator Programme entrant
- CO = College Accelerator Programme entrant
- NG = Next Gen Accelerator Program entrant
- w/o = Walkover
- r = Retired
- d = Defaulted

=== Finals ===
Semifinals
(Australia) Mark Woodforde	6	3	6
5	(Netherlands) Richard Krajicek	3	6	3
6	(Australia) Jason Stoltenberg	4	4
2	(Germany) Boris Becker	6	6

Final
(Australia) Mark Woodforde	2	2
2	(Germany) Boris Becker	6	6

=== Top half ===
First Round
1	(United States) Michael Chang	5	2
(United Kingdom) Mark Petchey	7	6
(United States) Alex O'Brien	6	4	4
(Australia) Mark Woodforde	2	6	6
(Brazil) Luiz Mattar	6^{0}	6	6
(United States) Jeff Tarango	7^{7}	4	3
(United States) Jared Palmer	6^{5}	6	6
7	(United States) Brad Gilbert	7^{7}	3	4
4	(Russia) Alexander Volkov	6^{5}	7^{9}	6
WC	(United States) Bryan Shelton	7^{7}	6^{7}	3
(Czech Republic) David Rikl	3	1
(Sweden) Jan Apell	6	6
Q	(United States) Robbie Weiss	6	6
WC	(United States) Brian Dunn	2	4
WC	(United States) Michael Joyce	6^{1}	1
5	(Netherlands) Richard Krajicek	7^{7}	6

Second Round
(United Kingdom) Mark Petchey	4	6^{4}
(Australia) Mark Woodforde	6	7^{7}
(Brazil) Luiz Mattar	6	3	4
(United States) Jared Palmer	3	6	6
4	(Russia) Alexander Volkov	4	2
(Sweden) Jan Apell	6	6
Q	(United States) Robbie Weiss	2	3
5	(Netherlands) Richard Krajicek	6	6

Quarterfinals
(Australia) Mark Woodforde	6^{5}	6	6
(United States) Jared Palmer	7^{7}	3	4
(Sweden) Jan Apell	4	6^{5}
5	(Netherlands) Richard Krajicek	6	7^{7}

Semifinals
(Australia) Mark Woodforde	6	3	6
5	(Netherlands) Richard Krajicek	3	6	3

=== Bottom half ===
First Round
6	(Australia) Jason Stoltenberg	7	6
(Sweden) Thomas Enqvist	5	4
(United States) Steve Bryan	6	6
Q	(Czech Republic) Libor Němeček	3	2
(United Kingdom) Greg Rusedski	6	6
(Colombia) Mauricio Hadad	3	4
(Sweden) Nicklas Kulti	2	1
3	(United States) Andre Agassi	6	6
8	(Germany) Karsten Braasch	6	6
Q	(South Africa) David Nainkin	3	0
Q	(United States) Steven Campbell	6	6
(Venezuela) Maurice Ruah	3	3
(United States) Chuck Adams	6^{7}	6	6
(Italy) Stefano Pescosolido	7^{9}	0	4
(South Africa) Grant Stafford	5	3
2	(Germany) Boris Becker	7	6

Second Round
6	(Australia) Jason Stoltenberg	7^{8}	6
(United States) Steve Bryan	6^{6}	3
(United Kingdom) Greg Rusedski	3	2
3	(United States) Andre Agassi	6	6
8	(Germany) Karsten Braasch	6	6
Q	(United States) Steven Campbell	4	2
(United States) Chuck Adams	6^{4}	1
2	(Germany) Boris Becker	7^{7}	6

Quarterfinals
6	(Australia) Jason Stoltenberg	4	6	6
3	(United States) Andre Agassi	6	2	3
8	(Germany) Karsten Braasch	6	6^{1}	2
2	(Germany) Boris Becker	2	7^{7}	6

Semifinals
6	(Australia) Jason Stoltenberg	4	4
2	(Germany) Boris Becker	6	6
