= 1998 Mercedes-Benz Cup – Singles =

Singles
- 1998 Mercedes-Benz Cup

Final
- Champion: (United States) Andre Agassi
- Runner-up: (United Kingdom) Tim Henman
- Score: 6–4, 6–4

Details
- Draw: 32 (4 Q / 2 WC )
- Seeds: 8

Events
Singles	Doubles
← 1997 ·	Los Angeles Open	· 1999 →

The 1998 Mercedes-Benz Cup was a men's tennis tournament played on hardcourt in Los Angeles, United States that was part of the International Series of the 1998 ATP Tour. It was the seventy-first edition of the tournament and was held from July 27 through August 2, 1998.

== Seeds ==
Champion seeds are indicated in bold text while text in italics indicates the round in which those seeds were eliminated.

1. (Australia) Patrick Rafter (quarterfinals)
2. (United Kingdom) Tim Henman (final)
3. (Croatia) Goran Ivanišević (first round)
4. Unknown (withdrew)
5. (United States) **Andre Agassi (champion)**
6. (South Africa) Wayne Ferreira (first round)
7. (Zimbabwe) Byron Black (quarterfinals)
8. (United States) Vince Spadea (second round)

== Draw ==
=== Key ===
- Q = Qualifier
- WC = Wild card
- LL = Lucky loser
- Alt = Alternate
- SE = Special exempt
- PR = Protected ranking
- ITF = ITF entry
- JE = Junior exempt
- w/o = Walkover
- r = Retired
- d = Defaulted
- SR = Special ranking

=== Finals ===
Semifinals
WC	(United States) Justin Gimelstob	0	6^{2}
5	**(United States) Andre Agassi**	**6**	**7**
(France) Guillaume Raoux	5	3
2	**(United Kingdom) Tim Henman**	**7**	**6**

Final
5	**(United States) Andre Agassi**	**6**	**6**
2	(United Kingdom) Tim Henman	4	4

=== Top half ===
First round
1	**(Australia) P Rafter**	**6**	**6**
(Paraguay) R Delgado	3	2
**(Czech Republic) M Damm**	2	**7**	**6**
(Zimbabwe) W Black	**6**	5	0
WC	**(United States) J Gimelstob**	**6**	**6**
(Czech Republic) D Vacek	4	0
8	**(United States) V Spadea**	2	**6**	**6**
Q	(South Africa) M Ondruska	**6**	3	3
LL	**(Australia) S Stolle**	**6**	**6**
Q	(United States) T Dent	3	2
**(Australia) A Ilie**	**6**	**6**
PR	(United States) MV Washington	4	1
**(United States) J-M Gambill**	**6**	**6**
(United States) S Campbell	4	4
5	**(United States) A Agassi**	**6**	**6**
WC	(United States) B Bryan	4	3

Second round
1	**(Australia) P Rafter**	**6**	5	**6**
(Czech Republic) M Damm	3	**7**	1
WC	**(United States) J Gimelstob**	**6**	3
8	(United States) V Spadea	3	0	R
LL	**(Australia) S Stolle**	**6**	**7**
(Australia) A Ilie	3	6^{6}
(United States) J-M Gambill	4	4
5	**(United States) A Agassi**	**6**	**6**

Quarterfinals
1	(Australia) P Rafter	4	3
WC	**(United States) J Gimelstob**	**6**	**6**
LL	(Australia) S Stolle	6^{2}	2
5	**(United States) A Agassi**	**7**	**6**

Semifinals
WC	(United States) J Gimelstob	0	6^{2}
5	**(United States) A Agassi**	**6**	**7**

=== Bottom half ===
First round
**(Armenia) S Sargsian**	**6**	**6**
6	(South Africa) W Ferreira	1	2
Q	**(United States) M Joyce**	**7**	2	**7**
(Australia) M Tebbutt	5	**6**	5
**(Denmark) K Carlsen**	**7**	**6**
LL	(Spain) Ó Burrieza	5	4
**(France) G Raoux**	**6**	**6**
3	(Croatia) G Ivanišević	4	4
7	**(Zimbabwe) B Black**	**6**	**7**
(Netherlands) S Schalken	4	6^{8}
**(Italy) G Pozzi**	**6**	**6**
(Argentina) G Cañas	2	4
**(United States) J Tarango**	**6**	**6**
Q	(Mexico) A Hernández	2	2
2	**(United Kingdom) T Henman**	**6**	**6**
(South Africa) G Stafford	3	0

Second round
(Armenia) S Sargsian	3	**6**	2
**(United States) M Joyce**	**6**	4	**6**
(Denmark) K Carlsen	6^{7}	**7**	6^{3}
**(France) G Raoux**	**7**	6^{1}	**7**
7	**(Zimbabwe) B Black**	**6**	**6**
(Italy) G Pozzi	3	2
(United States) J Tarango	6^{6}	5
2	**(United Kingdom) T Henman**	**7**	**7**

Quarterfinals
(United States) M Joyce	**7**	4	5
**(France) G Raoux**	6^{7}	**6**	**7**
7	(Zimbabwe) B Black	**7**	1	4
2	**(United Kingdom) T Henman**	5	**6**	**6**

Semifinals
(France) G Raoux	5	3
2	**(United Kingdom) T Henman**	**7**	**6**
