= 1993 Volvo Tennis/Los Angeles – Singles =

Singles
- 1993 Volvo Tennis/Los Angeles

Final
- Champion: (Netherlands) Richard Krajicek
- Runner-up: (United States) Michael Chang
- Score: 0–6, 7–6^{(7–3)}, 7–6^{(7–5)}

Details
- Draw: 32 (4Q / 3WC)
- Seeds: 8

Events
Singles	Doubles
← 1992 ·	Los Angeles Open	· 1994 →

Richard Krajicek successfully defended his title by defeating Michael Chang 0–6, 7–6^{(7–3)}, 7–6^{(7–5)} in the final.

== Seeds ==
1. (United States) Pete Sampras (semifinals)
2. (Germany) Michael Stich (quarterfinals)
3. (United States) Michael Chang (final)
4. (Netherlands) Richard Krajicek (champion)
5. (Russia) Alexander Volkov (quarterfinals)
6. (South Africa) Wayne Ferreira (first round)
7. (Australia) Mark Woodforde (first round)
8. (United States) Brad Gilbert (second round)

== Draw ==
=== Key ===
- Q = Qualifier
- WC = Wild card
- LL = Lucky loser
- Alt = Alternate
- SE = Special exempt
- PR = Protected ranking
- ITF = ITF entry
- JE = Junior exempt
- w/o = Walkover
- r = Retired
- d = Defaulted
- SR = Special ranking

=== Finals ===
Semifinals
1	(United States) Pete Sampras	4	6	6^{3}
4	(Netherlands) Richard Krajicek	6	3	7^{7}
3	(United States) Michael Chang	6	6
(United States) Chuck Adams	3	2

Final
4	(Netherlands) Richard Krajicek	0	7^{7}	7^{7}
3	(United States) Michael Chang	6	6^{3}	6^{5}

=== Top half ===
First round
1	(United States) P Sampras	6	6
(Canada) A Sznajder	1	2
(Colombia) M Hadad	6	3	6
(United States) D Rostagno	1	6	4
(United States) P McEnroe	7	6
(Netherlands) J Eltingh	5	3
(Brazil) L Mattar	6	6^{5}	2
8	(United States) B Gilbert	3	7^{7}	6
4	(Netherlands) R Krajicek	7^{7}	6
(Italy) G Pozzi	6^{2}	3
(Zimbabwe) B Black	6	3	4
(Australia) J Stoltenberg	4	6	6
WC	(United States) M Joyce	6	6
(Haiti) R Agénor	1	3
WC	(United States) B MacPhie	2	3
5	(Russia) A Volkov	6	6

Second round
1	(United States) P Sampras	6	6
(Colombia) M Hadad	4	0
(United States) P McEnroe	6^{8}	6	6
8	(United States) B Gilbert	7^{10}	3	0
4	(Netherlands) R Krajicek	1	7^{7}	6
(Australia) J Stoltenberg	6	6^{5}	0
WC	(United States) M Joyce	1	3
5	(Russia) A Volkov	6	6

Quarterfinals
1	(United States) P Sampras	7	6
(United States) P McEnroe	5	2
4	(Netherlands) R Krajicek	6	6
5	(Russia) A Volkov	1	4

Semifinals
1	(United States) P Sampras	4	6	6^{3}
4	(Netherlands) R Krajicek	6	3	7^{7}

=== Bottom half ===
First round
6	(South Africa) W Ferreira	6	0	3
(United States) A Krickstein	4	6	6
Q	(South Africa) D Nainkin	4	6	6
WC	(United States) D DiLucia	6	2	2
(United States) J Tarango	1	6	6
Q	(United States) T Bujan	6	3	4
(United States) J Stark	2	3
3	(United States) M Chang	6	6
7	(Australia) M Woodforde	6^{3}	6	2
(United States) A O'Brien	7^{7}	4	6
(South Africa) C van Rensburg	4	4
(United States) C Adams	6	6
Q	(United States) T Nelson	3	1
Q	(United States) K Jones	6	6
(Sweden) M Pernfors	2	4
2	(Germany) M Stich	6	6

Second round
(United States) A Krickstein	6	6
Q	(South Africa) D Nainkin	4	3
(United States) J Tarango	1	0
3	(United States) M Chang	6	6
(United States) A O'Brien	5	2
(United States) C Adams	7	6
Q	(United States) K Jones	2	3
2	(Germany) M Stich	6	6

Quarterfinals
(United States) A Krickstein	6	3	2
3	(United States) M Chang	4	6	6
(United States) C Adams	5	6	6
2	(Germany) M Stich	7	4	4

Semifinals
3	(United States) M Chang	6	6
(United States) C Adams	3	2
