= 1995 Infiniti Open =

- Date: July 31 – August 7
- Edition: 25th
- Category: ATP World Series
- Draw: 32S / 16D
- Prize money: $303,000
- Surface: Hard / outdoor
- Location: Los Angeles, U.S.
- Venue: Los Angeles Tennis Center

Champions

Singles
- (Germany) Michael Stich

Doubles
- (South Africa) Brent Haygarth / (United States) Kent Kinnear
← 1994 ·	Infiniti Open	· 1996 →

The 1995 Infiniti Open was a men's tennis tournament held at the Los Angeles Tennis Center in Los Angeles, California, United States. The tournament was played on hard court and was held from July 31 through August 7, 1995. Second-seeded Michael Stich won the singles title.

== Finals ==
=== Singles ===
(Germany) Michael Stich defeated (Sweden) Thomas Enqvist, 6–7^{(7–9)}, 7–6^{(7–4)}, 6–2

- It was Stich's first title of the year and 17th of his career.

=== Doubles ===
(South Africa) Brent Haygarth / (United States) Kent Kinnear defeated (United States) Scott Davis / (Croatia) Goran Ivanišević, 6–4, 7–6
