= 1992 Volvo Tennis/Los Angeles – Doubles =

Doubles
- 1992 Volvo Tennis/Los Angeles

Final
- Champions: (United States) Patrick Galbraith (United States) Jim Pugh
- Runners-up: (United States) Francisco Montana (United States) David Wheaton
- Score: 7–6, 7–6

Details
- Draw: 16
- Seeds: 4

Events
Singles	Doubles
- Los Angeles Open

Javier Frana and Jim Pugh were the defending champions, but Frana did not compete this year.

Pugh teamed up with Patrick Galbraith and successfully defended his title, by defeating Francisco Montana and David Wheaton 7–6, 7–6 in the final.

== Seeds ==
1. (Australia) Mark Kratzmann / (United States) Rick Leach (quarterfinals)
2. (United States) Luke Jensen / (Australia) Laurie Warder (first round)
3. (United States) Kent Kinnear / (United States) Sven Salumaa (quarterfinals)
4. (United States) Patrick Galbraith / (United States) Jim Pugh (champions)

== Draw ==
Key

- Q = Qualifier
- WC = Wild card
- LL = Lucky loser
- Alt = Alternate
- ITF = ITF entry
- PR = Protected ranking
- SR = Special ranking
- SE = Special exempt
- JE = Junior exempt
- JR = Junior Accelerator Programme entrant
- CO = College Accelerator Programme entrant
- NG = Next Gen Accelerator Program entrant
- w/o = Walkover
- r = Retired
- d = Defaulted

=== Draw ===
First round
1	(Australia) M Kratzmann (United States) R Leach	6	6	6
Q	(United States) P Crow (United States) A Nathan	0	7	2
(Netherlands) R Krajicek (Australia) M Woodforde	6	7	6
WC	(Sweden) B Borg (South Africa) D Visser	7	5	3
4	(United States) P Galbraith (United States) J Pugh	7	7
(United States) M Briggs (United States) D Randall	5	5
(Australia) S Stolle (Australia) J Stoltenberg	7	3	3
(United Kingdom) J Bates (Zimbabwe) B Black	6	6	6
(United States) S Cannon (United States) G Van Emburgh	7	6
(Australia) N Borwick (Australia) S Youl	6	2
(Canada) G Michibata (United States) B Pearce	4	6	3
3	(United States) K Kinnear (United States) S Salumaa	6	4	6
WC	(United States) D Rostagno (United States) J Tarango	4	4
(United States) F Montana (United States) D Wheaton	6	6
(United States) C Beckman (Australia) B Dyke	6	7
2	(United States) L Jensen (Australia) L Warder	3	6

Quarterfinals
1	(Australia) M Kratzmann (United States) R Leach	3	7	2
(Netherlands) R Krajicek (Australia) M Woodforde	6	6	6
4	(United States) P Galbraith (United States) J Pugh	7	6	6
(United Kingdom) J Bates (Zimbabwe) B Black	6	7	1
(United States) S Cannon (United States) G Van Emburgh	6	6
3	(United States) K Kinnear (United States) S Salumaa	3	4
(United States) F Montana (United States) D Wheaton	6	7
(United States) C Beckman (Australia) B Dyke	4	5

Semifinals
(Netherlands) R Krajicek (Australia) M Woodforde	7	3	3
4	(United States) P Galbraith (United States) J Pugh	6	6	6
(United States) S Cannon (United States) G Van Emburgh	2	7	1
(United States) F Montana (United States) D Wheaton	6	6	6

Final
4	(United States) P Galbraith (United States) J Pugh	7	7
(United States) F Montana (United States) D Wheaton	6	6
