= 1991 Volvo Tennis/Los Angeles – Singles =

Singles
- 1991 Volvo Tennis/Los Angeles

Final
- Champion: (United States) Pete Sampras
- Runner-up: (United States) Brad Gilbert
- Score: 6–2, 6–7^{(5–7)}, 6–3

Details
- Draw: 32 (4Q / 3WC)
- Seeds: 8

Events
Singles	Doubles
- Los Angeles Open

Stefan Edberg was the defending champion, but lost in the semifinals to Brad Gilbert.

Pete Sampras won the title by defeating Brad Gilbert 6–2, 6–7^{(5–7)}, 6–3 in the final.

== Seeds ==
1. (Sweden) Stefan Edberg (semifinals)
2. (United States) Pete Sampras (champion)
3. (United States) Michael Chang (second round)
4. (United States) Brad Gilbert (final)
5. (Italy) Cristiano Caratti (first round)
6. (Australia) Todd Woodbridge (second round)
7. (United States) Aaron Krickstein (quarterfinals)
8. (Israel) Amos Mansdorf (quarterfinals)

== Draw ==
Key

- Q = Qualifier
- WC = Wild card
- LL = Lucky loser
- Alt = Alternate
- ITF = ITF entry
- PR = Protected ranking
- SR = Special ranking
- SE = Special exempt
- JE = Junior exempt
- JR = Junior Accelerator Programme entrant
- CO = College Accelerator Programme entrant
- NG = Next Gen Accelerator Program entrant
- w/o = Walkover
- r = Retired
- d = Defaulted

=== Finals ===
Semifinals
1	(Sweden) Stefan Edberg	6^{2}	7^{7}	4
4	(United States) Brad Gilbert	7^{7}	6^{1}	6
(Italy) Stefano Pescosolido	3	1
2	(United States) Pete Sampras	6	6

Final
4	(United States) Brad Gilbert	2	7^{7}	3
2	(United States) Pete Sampras	6	6^{5}	6

=== Top half ===
First round
1	(Sweden) S Edberg	6	6
(India) R Krishnan	4	3
(Sweden) P Lundgren	7	6
(United States) D Pate	5	2
(Australia) J Stoltenberg	6	6
WC	(United States) P Annacone	1	3
(United States) D Goldie	6^{6}	6^{4}
7	(United States) A Krickstein	7^{8}	7^{7}
4	(United States) B Gilbert	6	7
Q	(Argentina) J Frana	3	5
WC	(United States) J Pugh	6	5	1
(France) JP Fleurian	4	7	6
(United States) B Pearce	6	1	1
Q	(United States) S Bryan	1	6	6
(South Africa) W Ferreira	3	6^{4}
6	(Australia) T Woodbridge	6	7^{7}

Second round
1	(Sweden) S Edberg	6	6
(Sweden) P Lundgren	3	4
(Australia) J Stoltenberg	3	6	3
7	(United States) A Krickstein	6	3	6
4	(United States) B Gilbert	7^{7}	6
(France) JP Fleurian	6^{3}	0
Q	(United States) S Bryan	6	6
6	(Australia) T Woodbridge	4	2

Quarterfinals
1	(Sweden) S Edberg	6	7
7	(United States) A Krickstein	4	5
4	(United States) B Gilbert	6	6
Q	(United States) S Bryan	1	3

Semifinals
1	(Sweden) S Edberg	6^{2}	7^{7}	4
4	(United States) B Gilbert	7^{7}	6^{1}	6

=== Bottom half ===
First round
5	(Italy) C Caratti	3	2
(United States) S Davis	6	6
WC	(United States) J Stark	5	5
(South Africa) G Muller	7	7
(Australia) M Woodforde	4	4
(Italy) S Pescosolido	6	6
(Sweden) M Pernfors	6	1	6^{0}
3	(United States) M Chang	2	6	7^{7}
8	(Israel) A Mansdorf	6	6
(Sweden) T Högstedt	4	3
Q	(South Africa) M Kaplan	2	4
Q	(Italy) G Pozzi	6	6
(Japan) S Matsuoka	6	6
(United States) J Tarango	3	1
(Israel) G Bloom	0	2
2	(United States) P Sampras	6	6

Second round
(United States) S Davis	7^{7}	3	6
(South Africa) G Muller	6^{5}	6	3
(Italy) S Pescosolido	4	6	6
3	(United States) M Chang	6	2	4
8	(Israel) A Mansdorf	6	6
Q	(Italy) G Pozzi	4	3
(Japan) S Matsuoka	3	4
2	(United States) P Sampras	6	6

Quarterfinals
(United States) S Davis	6^{5}	3
(Italy) S Pescosolido	7^{7}	6
8	(Israel) A Mansdorf	3	4
2	(United States) P Sampras	6	6

Semifinals
(Italy) S Pescosolido	3	1
2	(United States) P Sampras	6	6
