= 1998 Mercedes-Benz Cup =

- Date: 27 July – 2 August
- Edition: 71st
- Category: World Series
- Draw: 32S / 16D
- Prize money: $315,000
- Surface: Hard / outdoor
- Location: Los Angeles, United States
- Venue: Los Angeles Tennis Center

Champions

Singles
- (United States) Andre Agassi

Doubles
- (Australia) Patrick Rafter / (Australia) Sandon Stolle
- Los Angeles Open

The 1998 Mercedes-Benz Cup was a men's tennis tournament played on outdoor hardcourts at the Los Angeles Tennis Center in Los Angeles, United States that was part of the World Series of the 1998 ATP Tour. It was the seventy-first edition of the tournament and was held from 27 July – 2 August 1998. Fifth-seeded Andre Agassi won the singles title and the accompanying $45,000 first-prize money.

== Finals ==
=== Singles ===
(United States) Andre Agassi defeated (United Kingdom) Tim Henman, 6–4, 6–4

- It was Agassi's 4th singles title of the year and the 38th of his career

=== Doubles ===
(Australia) Patrick Rafter / (Australia) Sandon Stolle defeated (United States) Jeff Tarango / (Czech Republic) Daniel Vacek 6–4, 6–4
