= 1993 Volvo Tennis/Los Angeles =

- Date: August 2–8
- Edition: 67th
- Category: ATP World Series
- Draw: 32S / 16D
- Prize money: $275,000
- Surface: Hard / outdoor
- Location: Los Angeles, U.S.
- Venue: Los Angeles Tennis Center

Champions

Singles
- (Netherlands) Richard Krajicek

Doubles
- (South Africa) Wayne Ferreira / (Germany) Michael Stich
- Los Angeles Open

The 1993 Volvo Tennis/Los Angeles was a men's tennis tournament held on outdoor hardcourts at the Los Angeles Tennis Center in Los Angeles, California in the United States that was part of the World Series category of the 1993 ATP Tour. It was the 67th edition of the tournament and was held from August 2, 1993, to August 8, 1993. Fourth-seeded Richard Krajicek won his second consecutive singles title at the event and earned $39,600 first-prize money.

== Finals ==
=== Singles ===
(Netherlands) Richard Krajicek defeated (United States) Michael Chang 0–6, 7–6^{(7–3)}, 7–6^{(7–5)}

- It was Krajicek's 1st and only singles title of the year and the 4th of his career.

=== Doubles ===
(South Africa) Wayne Ferreira / (Germany) Michael Stich defeated (Canada) Grant Connell / (United States) Scott Davis 7–6, 7–6

== See also ==
- 1993 Virginia Slims of Los Angeles – women's tournament
