= Pat Crow =

American tennis player

- Country (sports): United States
- Born: April 11, 1966 (age 58); Long Beach, California
- Height: 6 ft 2 in (188 cm)
- Turned pro: 1991
- Plays: Left-handed
- Prize money: $20,570

Singles
- Career record: 0-2
- Career titles: 0
- Highest ranking: No. 255 (October 7, 1991)

Grand Slam singles results
- US Open: 1R (1991)

Doubles
- Career record: 0-1
- Career titles: 0
- Highest ranking: No. 422 (June 10, 1991)

Pat Crow (born April 11, 1966) is a former professional tennis player from the United States.

Crow was a qualifier for the main draw of the 1991 US Open and faced Michael Joyce in the opening round. He lost in four sets.
